= Norm Ferguson (animator) =

American animator

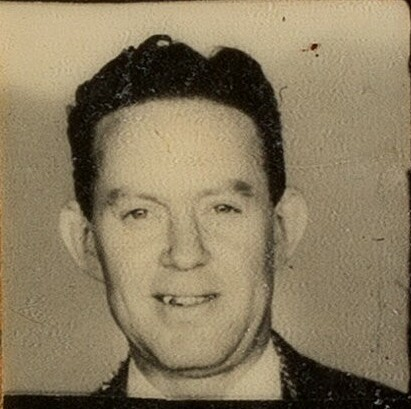
- Ferguson in 1942
- Born: William Norman Ferguson; September 2, 1902; Manhattan, New York, U.S.
- Died: November 4, 1957 (aged 55); Los Angeles, California, U.S.
- Occupation: Animator
- Employer(s): Fables Pictures Inc. (1923–1929); Walt Disney Productions (1929–1953)
- Spouse: Gladys F. (m. 1924)
- Children: 1

William Norman Ferguson (September 2, 1902 – November 4, 1957) was an American animator for Walt Disney Studios and a central contributor to the studio's stylistic development in the 1930s. He is most frequently noted for his contribution to the creation of Pluto, one of the studio's best-known and most enduring characters, and is the artist most closely associated with that character. He is also credited for developing Peg-Leg Pete and the Big Bad Wolf. Ferguson, known at the studio as "Norm" or "Fergy", was the primary animator of the witch from Snow White and the Seven Dwarfs, the first in a long line of great Disney feature villains. He was also a sequence director on the film.

== Career ==
Ferguson was born in Manhattan, New York City, in 1902.

After starting at the studio in 1929 as a cameraman, he switched to the animation department and rose rapidly, despite a lack of formal art training. His early animation of the dog who would become Pluto drew strong response at the studio and on-screen. The character's personality and apparent inner life was considered a great step forward for the young art form of animation. Animators Frank Thomas and Ollie Johnston paid extensive tribute to Ferguson's work in their 1981 book Disney Animation: The Illusion of Life, calling his famous "flypaper sequence" from the 1934 short Playful Pluto – in which the dog is stuck to a piece of flypaper – a "milestone in personality animation...through it all, his reaction to his predicament and his thoughts of what to try next are shared with the audience. It was the first time a character seemed to be thinking on the screen, and, though it lasted only 65 seconds, it opened the way for animation of real characters with real problems."

He is remembered for having worked "rough" and "loose", in animation terms, with a focus on feeling, action, and the character's personality rather than detail, structure, or formal draftsmanship. Fellow animator Fred Moore is quoted as having said of Ferguson, "He doesn't know that you can't raise the eyebrows above the head circle, so he goes ahead and does it and it gives a great effect." Animator Shamus Culhane remembered Ferguson as having produced a high volume of work- about 18 feet a week as opposed to the more average ten at the Disney Studios at the time. (A "foot" of animation- a measurement based on film footage- is sixteen frames).

Norm Ferguson served as a sequence director or directing animator on many of the classic Walt Disney features films from Snow White and the Seven Dwarfs in 1937 through the 1950s, including Pinocchio, Fantasia, Bambi, Cinderella, Peter Pan, and Alice in Wonderland.

Ferguson, who later in life suffered from diabetes, left the Disney Studios with his health and career in decline in about 1953. Immediately after a brief, unsuccessful stint with Shamus Culhane Productions, described by Culhane in his 1986 book Talking Animals And Other People, Ferguson died as a result of a heart attack in Los Angeles, California, in 1957.

Ferguson posthumously received the industry's Winsor McCay Award in 1987 and was posthumously inducted as a Disney Legend by the studio in 1999, along with fellow animator Hamilton Luske (also posthumous), among others. The two men are the subjects of chapter five in Thomas and Johnston's Disney Animation: The Illusion of Life, titled "Cartoon Comes of Age: Norm Ferguson and Ham Luske."

== Filmography ==
=== Feature films ===
Year	Title	Role	Notes
1937	Snow White and the Seven Dwarfs	supervising animator	
1940	Pinocchio	supervising animator and sequence director	"J. Worthington Foulfellow" and "Gideon"
1940	Fantasia	supervising animator and director	"Dance of the Hours" segment
1941	The Reluctant Dragon	Himself	
1941	Dumbo	directing animator and sequence director	
1942	Bambi	supervising animator	
1942	Saludos Amigos	supervising animator and supervising director	Pedro, El Gaucho Goofy, Aquarela do Brasil
1944	The Three Caballeros	Director and production supervisor	
1950	Cinderella	directing animator	
1951	Alice in Wonderland	directing animator	
1953	Peter Pan	directing animator	

=== Short films ===
Year	Title	Role	Notes
1926	School Days	Animator	
1927	Horses, Horses, Horses	Animator	
1929	Mickey's Choo-Choo	Animator	
1930	Cannibal Capers	Animator	
1930	Frolicking Fish	Animator	
1930	The Gorilla Mystery	Animator	
1930	Arctic Antics	Animator	
1930	Midnight in a Toy Shop	Animator	
1930	Night	Animator	
1930	The Chain Gang	Animator	
1930	Pioneer Days	Animator	
1930	The Fire Fighters	Animator	
1930	Monkey Melodies	Animator	
1930	The Picnic	Animator	
1930	Winter	Animator	
1930	Playful Pan	Animator	
1931	Traffic Troubles	Animator	
1931	The Birthday Party	Animator	
1931	Mother Goose Melodies	Animator	
1931	Blue Rhythm	Animator	
1931	The Castaway	Animator	
1931	Birds of a Feather	Animator	
1931	The Moose Hunt	Animator	
1931	The Delivery Boy	Animator	
1931	The Beach Party	Animator	
1931	Mickey Cuts Up	Animator	
1931	Mickey's Orphans	Animator	
1931	The Barnyard Broadcast	Animator	
1932	The Whoopee Party	Animator	
1932	Trader Mickey	Animator	
1932	The Duck Hunt	Animator	
1932	Flowers and Trees	Animator	
1932	The Mad Dog	Animator	
1932	Babes in the Woods	Animator	
1932	Mickey's Nightmare	Animator	
1932	King Neptune	Animator	
1932	Bugs in Love	Animator	
1932	The Klondike Kid	Animator	
1932	Santa's Workshop	Animator	
1932	Mickey's Good Deed	Animator	
1933	Puppy Love	Animator	
1933	Mickey's Pal Pluto	Animator	
1933	Birds in the Spring	Animator	
1933	The Pet Store	Animator	
1933	Ye Olden Days	Animator	
1933	Father Noah's Ark	Animator	
1933	Three Little Pigs	Animator	
1933	Old King Cole	Animator	
1934	Shanghaied	Animator	
1934	The Big Bad Wolf	Animator	
1934	Playful Pluto	Animator	
1934	Gulliver Mickey	Animator	
1934	Orphan's Benefit	Animator	
1934	Mickey's Steam Roller	Animator	
1935	Who Killed Cock Robin?	Animator	
1935	The Golden Touch	Animator	
1935	Pluto's Judgement Day	Animator	
1935	On Ice	Animator	
1936	Mother Pluto	Animator	
1936	Moving Day	Animator	
1936	Alpine Climbers	Animator	
1936	Mickey's Polo Team	Animator	
1936	Mickey's Grand Opera	Animator	
1936	Donald and Pluto	Animator	
1936	Three Little Wolves	Animator	
1936	Mickey's Elephant	Animator	
1937	Pluto's Quin-puplets	Animator	
1937	Moose Hunters	Animator	
1938	The Fox Hunt	Animator	
1939	The Practical Pig	Animator	
1939	The Pointer	Animator	
1939	Beach Picnic	Animator	
1939	Society Dog Show	Animator	
1939	Officer Duck	Animator	
1940	Bone Trouble	Animator	
1941	Pluto's Playmate	Animator and director	
1951	Plutopia	Animator	
1951	R'coon Dawg	Animator	
1951	Cold Turkey	Animator	
1952	Pluto's Party	Animator	
1953	The Simple Things	Animator	
1954	Social Lion	Animator	
1958	To Itch His Own	Animator	Released posthumously Work done after he was fired from Disney, most of his animation was overhauled.

=== TV series ===
Year	Title	Role	Notes
1956	Disneyland	Animator	Episode: Where Do the Stories Come From?
