= Clarabelle Cow =

Disney cartoon character

- Mickey Mouse character
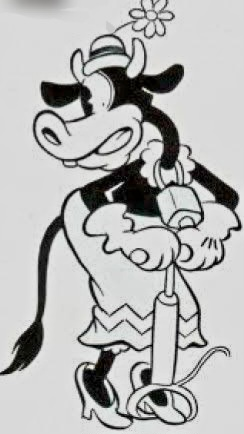
- First appearance: Steamboat Willie (1928)
- Created by: Ub Iwerks; Walt Disney
- Designed by: Walt Disney
- Voiced by: Elvia Allman (1933–1935, 1990); Pinto Colvig (1933); April Winchell (1996–present)
- Species: Cow
- Gender: Female
- Family: Mayor Beeble (deceased father); Mrs. Cow (mother); Durham Cow (deceased grandfather); Sarabelle Cow (sister); Itsy-Betsy (niece); Miss Bovina (aunt); Boniface (cousin); Bertie the Jinx (younger cousin); Bella (pet dog)
- Significant others: Horace Horsecollar; Goofy (occasionally)

Clarabelle Cow is a cartoon character created by The Walt Disney Company. As a domestic anthropomorphic cow, Clarabelle is one of Minnie Mouse's best friends. She was once depicted as the girlfriend of Horace Horsecollar, although now she is often paired with Goofy.

== Appearances ==
=== Animation ===
Clarabelle first appeared as a non-anthropomorphic cow in the Mickey Mouse cartoon Plane Crazy in 1928. Anthropomorphized soon afterward, she appeared frequently in cartoons from 1930 to 1932 and less frequently afterwards, taking her final classic-era bow in 1942. As with most Disney characters, she was later given small cameos in the featurettes Mickey's Christmas Carol (1983) and The Prince and the Pauper (1990) and the 1988 feature film Who Framed Roger Rabbit.

Clarabelle mostly played bit-parts in the 30+ films in which she appeared and her character was never as fully developed as Mickey, Minnie, Goofy, Donald Duck or Pluto. She and Horace Horsecollar changed from normal farmyard animals into anthropomorphized beings as necessary.

In modern animation, Clarabelle has returned to active use, appearing first in a few segments of Mickey Mouse Works and in a brief scene in Mickey's Once Upon a Christmas.

In House of Mouse, she regularly turned up as a gossip columnist with the tagline "Gossip is Always True".

Clarabelle has a major appearance in the direct-to-video film Mickey, Donald, Goofy: The Three Musketeers as Pete's lieutenant and Goofy's love interest.

She is a recurring character in the preschool series Mickey Mouse Clubhouse, in which she owns a puppy named Bella.

Clarabelle has appeared in Paul Rudish's new series of Mickey Mouse shorts and later its successor The Wonderful World of Mickey Mouse, where she occasionally tags along with Minnie and Daisy in certain shorts.

Clarabelle also appears in the spin-off Mickey Mouse Mixed-Up Adventures.

Clarabelle Cow appears in Mickey Mouse Funhouse. While working as a plumber and a baker by trade, Clarabelle has different counterparts in the Adventure Worlds. Lady Clarabelle is the proprietor of a Majestica pie shop. Mayor Clarabelle is the Mayor of Sunny Gulch. Trader Clarabelle is a trader in Razzle Dazzle Dunes. Captain Clarabelle is among Herotropolis' residential superheroes. An unnamed counterpart of Clarabelle in Sportstopia works as a volleyball player. Care-abelle Cow is a witch who resides in the Land of Myth and Legend's Forest Primeval. Buccaneer Belle is a buccaneer operating in the Adventure Sea Islands and is served by First Mate Cuckoo-Loca. Lunar Clarabelle is the proprietor of the Lunar Lunch Box in outer space. An unnamed counterpart of Clarabelle works as a camera operator in Magic Movie Land.

She also appears in Mickey Mouse Clubhouse+ where she is a proprietor of the Moo Mart. Clarabelle has several alter egos, who appear as the Mystery Mousekepal in some episodes. Beekeeper Clarabelle, appearing in "Please the Bees", is a beekeeper who wears a beekeeper outfit with functional wings. In "Mickey's Backpack Adventure", she appears as a Mystery Mousekepal named Aviator Clarabelle. The episode "Martian Mickey's Clubhouse" features Clarabelle's Martian counterpart Lady Moo-Moo, owner of the Martian Moo Mart.

=== Filmography ===
==== Short films ====
1. 1928 – Steamboat Willie
2. 1928 – Plane Crazy
3. 1929 – The Plowboy
4. 1929 – Mickey's Choo-Choo
5. 1929 – The Karnival Kid
6. 1930 – The Barnyard Concert
7. 1930 – The Shindig
8. 1930 – The Chain Gang
9. 1930 – Pioneer Days
10. 1931 – The Birthday Party
11. 1931 – Mother Goose Melodies
12. 1931 – Blue Rhythm
13. 1931 – The Barnyard Broadcast
14. 1931 – The Beach Party
15. 1932 – The Mad Dog
16. 1932 – Barnyard Olympics
17. 1932 – Mickey's Revue
18. 1932 – Mickey's Nightmare
19. 1932 – The Whoopee Party
20. 1932 – Touchdown Mickey
21. 1932 – Parade of the Award Nominees
22. 1933 – Mickey's Mellerdrammer
23. 1933 – Ye Olden Days
24. 1933 – Mickey's Gala Premiere
25. 1934 – Camping Out
26. 1934 – Orphan's Benefit
27. 1935 – The Band Concert
28. 1935 – On Ice
29. 1935 – Mickey's Fire Brigade
30. 1936 – Mickey's Grand Opera
31. 1936 – Mickey's Polo Team
32. 1937 – Mickey's Amateurs
33. 1941 – Orphan's Benefit (remake)
34. 1942 – Mickey's Birthday Party
35. 1942 – Symphony Hour
36. 1983 – Mickey's Christmas Carol (cameo)
37. 1990 – Roller Coaster Rabbit (cameo)
38. 1990 – The Prince and the Pauper
39. 2013 – Get a Horse!
40. 2023 - Once Upon a Studio (cameo)

==== Feature films ====
1. 1988 – Who Framed Roger Rabbit (cameo)
2. 1999 – Mickey's Once Upon a Christmas (cameo)
3. 2004 – Mickey, Donald, Goofy: The Three Musketeers
4. 2018 – Ralph Breaks the Internet (cameo)

==== Television series ====
1. 1993 – Bonkers (Stork Exchange/Rubber Room Song (Casabonkers))
2. 1999 – Mickey Mouse Works
3. 2001 – House of Mouse
4. 2006 – Mickey Mouse Clubhouse
5. 2011 – Minnie's Bow-Toons
6. 2013 – Mickey Mouse
7. 2017 – Mickey Mouse Mixed-Up Adventures
8. 2020 – The Wonderful World of Mickey Mouse
9. 2021 – Mickey Mouse Funhouse
10. 2025 – Mickey Mouse Clubhouse+

=== Comics ===
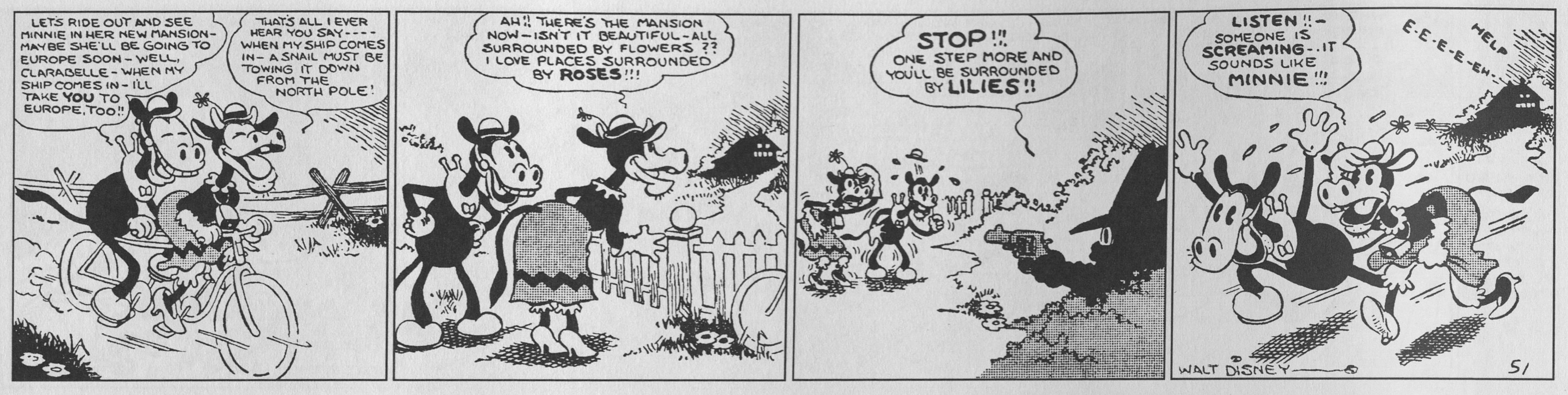
Clarabelle and Horace Horsecollar in a Mickey Mouse comic strip (May 5, 1930)

When the Disney characters started to feature in comic strips and comic books, Clarabelle Cow was one of the first. Her first appearance was in the Mickey Mouse comic strip for April 2, 1930. Along with Horace Horsecollar, Clara Cluck, Goofy, Minnie, and Mickey, she appeared in comics on a regular basis in the fifties, sixties and seventies.

For a brief time, during the late 1960s, Clarabelle began dating Goofy. During this time, Horace's whereabouts are unknown. Clarabelle's status with Goofy was challenged by a rival named Glory-Bee. In later comics, Clarabelle and Horace were a couple again. Clarabelle also has a young cousin, Bertie the Jinx, a niece, Itsy-Betsy, and a socialite aunt named Miss Bovina, who have appeared in several issues of Walt Disney's Comics and Stories.

From the eighties forward, only a few stories with Clarabelle Cow were made in the United States. In Europe, especially in Italy, the production of stories continued to the present day. In Italian comics, Clarabelle (called Clarabella) is very popular and she is the girlfriend of Horace Horsecollar (Orazio Cavezza).

=== Disney theme parks ===
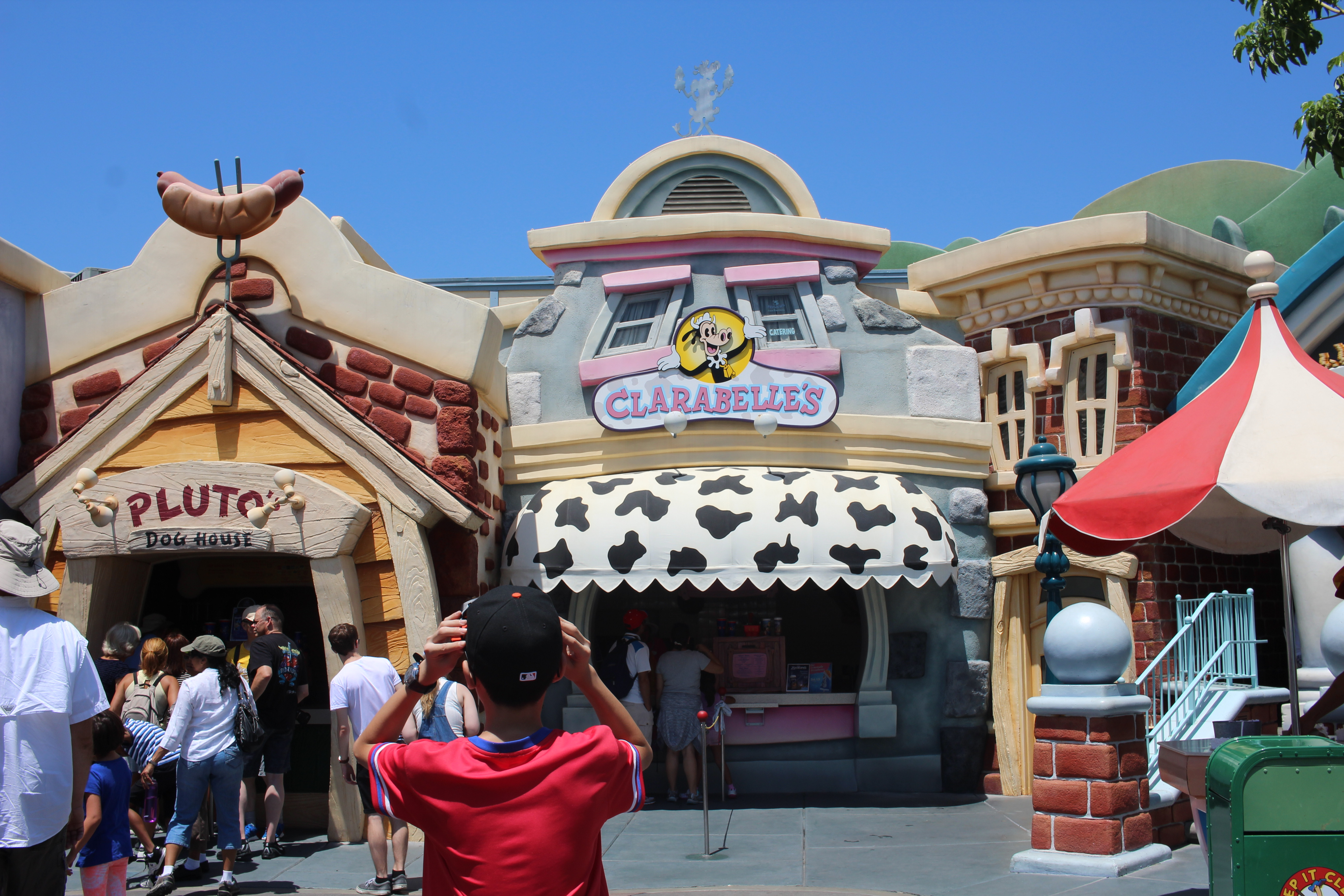
Clarabelle's, a cold dairy store in Mickey's Toontown.

From September 2006 to September 2008, Clarabelle Cow and Horace Horsecollar appeared together for meet-and-greets in Town Square at the Magic Kingdom in Walt Disney World. Also, they were in the Main Street Family Fun Day Parade. Clarabelle appears seasonally in "Mickey's Boo-to-You Halloween Parade", "Mickey's Once Upon a Christmastime Parade", and the "Mickey's Most Merriest Celebration" castle show. She and Horace both appear in the Hoedown Happening in Frontierland and as featured characters in the "Move It! Shake It! Mousekedance It!" street party, with Clarabelle in particular atop her own party box and with her own dialogue.

Clarabelle also appears (without Horace) at Disneyland Park. She has also appeared in several Disneyland parades and shows over the years, including The World According to Goofy, Light Magic, the Parade of the Stars, Fantasmic, A Christmas Fantasy Parade and Celebrate! A Street Party. Clarabelle and Horace come out for meet-and-greets and appear in parades and shows on a regular basis at Tokyo Disneyland as well. In 2009, Clarabelle played a leading character in the New Year's Greeting at Tokyo Disneyland and Tokyo DisneySea.

Clarabelle Cow was chosen to meet and greet for Character Fan Days at Disneyland. She is accompanied by Horace Horsecollar which is his first meet and greet at Disneyland in Anaheim.

At Disney California Adventure at the Disneyland Resort, in the Buena Vista Street area there is an ice cream shop named Clarabelle's Hand-Scooped Ice Cream.

She also features with Horace in Mickey's Halloween Celebration and Goofy's Garden Party in Disneyland Paris. In Christmas 2016, Clarabelle returned to Magic Kingdom for Mickey's Most Merriest Celebration.

=== Video games ===
Clarabelle's modern appearance

Clarabelle appeared as the DJ of the song "Miwaku No Tango" in the 2000 Japanese Nintendo 64 game Dance Dance Revolution Disney Dancing Museum.

Clarabelle appears in Disney's Toontown Online. She plays the role of giving the player furniture to decorate their estates, with the catalog players must order from is a "Cattlelog". Her appearance is also somewhat changed to look like an operator.

She also makes a minor appearance in Kingdom Hearts II in the Timeless River World using her old black and white design. She appears with the same design in Kingdom Hearts III in the minigame "The Karnival Kid".

She appears in Disney Magic Kingdoms as a playable character available to unlock for a limited time.

=== Parodies ===
Clarabelle appears briefly in the episode "Who Ate Wally's Waffles?" of the series Paradise PD at the entrance of Disney World as one of the employees of the park.
