= Building a Building =

1933 film by David Hand

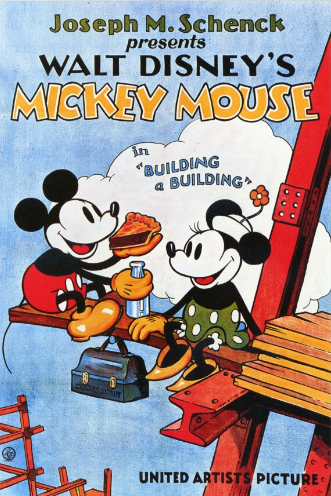
- Theatrical release poster
- Directed by: David Hand
- Produced by: Walt Disney
- Starring: Pinto Colvig; Walt Disney; Marcellite Garner
- Color process: Black-and-white
- Production company: Walt Disney Productions
- Distributed by: United Artists
- Release date: January 7, 1933
- Running time: 7 minutes
- Country: United States
- Language: English

Building a Building is a 1933 American animated short film directed by David Hand. It is the 51st film of the Mickey Mouse series. Its plot is functionally similar to the Oswald the Lucky Rabbit film Sky Scrappers, the final film of the series to be directed by Walt Disney.

The film was nominated for the Academy Award for Best Animated Short Film at the 6th Academy Awards, but lost to Disney's own Three Little Pigs. This was the second Mickey Mouse cartoon nominated for an Oscar.

== Plot ==
At a construction site, Mickey Mouse is operating a steam shovel. Minnie Mouse appears on a cart pulled by Pluto; she is selling box lunches to the workers.

After he uses the steam shovel to retrieve Minnie's hat (which had blown off and landed by him), Mickey inadvertently throws dirt from the steam shovel onto foreman Peg-Leg Pete (whose peg leg is on the left leg rather than the right), to the latter's frustration. Mickey hurriedly brings up a load of bricks in a wheelbarrow. Meanwhile, Pete sees Minnie and flirts with her, though she is not interested. Distracted by Minnie, Mickey accidentally drops the bricks on Pete.

After Mickey eventually falls through the blueprint, Pete begins to strangle Mickey, but the workers have their lunch break soon after. Mickey settles down to eat a fish sandwich, but it is stolen by Pete. Minnie offers Mickey a free box lunch, but Pete uses a crane to abduct her.

Mickey chases after Pete, and finally fights him high up on the building. Minnie grabs a pan of red-hot rivets and drops them down Pete's pants. This gives the mice enough time to flee as Pete pours water down his pants.

In the process of chasing Mickey and Minnie, Pete has an anvil fall on his head and fires rivets at them with a handheld pneumatic hammer. This turns on him when the hammer falls into his pants and gets attached to his peg leg. The mice escape down a chute riding a wheelbarrow, while Pete falls into a cement mixer, accidentally dismantles a large portion of the building. Enraged by the damage, Pete angrily fires Mickey, but the latter does not care as he immediately goes into business with Minnie selling box lunches.

== Reception ==
Piotr Borowiec said that this cartoon has better animation, stronger story lines, and better gags than the previous ones. Studio art instructor Don Graham taught a class in which students studied live-action films and compared them to Disney cartoons. In the class, the students compared Elmer Elephant and this cartoon. The students said that Building a Building was better. Michael Barrier disagreed about their decision, but he said that the students did have a point.

== Voice cast ==
- Mickey Mouse: Walt Disney
- Minnie Mouse: Marcellite Garner
- Pegleg Pete: Pinto Colvig
- Crane: Unknown

== Home media ==
The short was released on December 2, 2002, on Walt Disney Treasures: Mickey Mouse in Black and White. It was released to Disney+ on July 7, 2023.

While the short was released in 1933, its copyright was registered in 1932. The short's copyright was later renewed in 1959, and it will enter the public domain under its 1932 registration on January 1, 2028. (Note: Under R248219)

== Legacy ==
- Building a Building is an area in the Timeless River world in the 2005 video game Kingdom Hearts II. Other shorts that are featured as areas of that world are Steamboat Willie, Gulliver Mickey, The Fire Fighters, and Mickey's Orphans.
- The steam shovel Mickey pilots in this short reappeared in the 2010 video game Epic Mickey during the Mickeyjunk Mountain level, while the short itself appears as a 2D level in the 2012 sequel Epic Mickey 2: The Power of Two.

== See also ==
- Mickey Mouse (film series)
