= Horace Horsecollar =

Disney cartoon character

- Mickey Mouse & Friends character
- First appearance: The Plowboy (1929)
- Created by: Ub Iwerks; Walt Disney
- Voiced by: Pinto Colvig (1932); Billy Bletcher (1933); Bill Farmer (1990–present)
- Species: Horse
- Gender: Male
- Significant other: Clarabelle Cow
- Relatives: Pa Horsecollar (father); Fufezia (aunt); Curiazio (cousin)

Horace Horsecollar is a cartoon character created in 1929 at Walt Disney Animation Studios. Horace is a tall anthropomorphic black horse and is one of Mickey Mouse's best friends. Characterized as a boastful show-off, Horace served as Mickey’s sidekick in Disney's early black-and-white shorts.

Horace first appeared as Mickey's plow horse in the 1929 cartoon The Plowboy. Later that same year, he appeared in The Jazz Fool and afterwards became a regular member of the Disney supporting cast along with Clarabelle Cow and Clara Cluck. Though typically a supporting character, he was given significant screen time in the cartoons The Beach Party (1931) and Camping Out (1934). In recent years, Horace has appeared in the television series Mickey Mouse Works, House of Mouse, Mickey Mouse, Mickey Mouse Mixed-Up Adventures, Mickey Mouse Funhouse, and Mickey Mouse Clubhouse+.

In the comics, Horace helped Mickey on his sleuthing expeditions before Goofy assumed that role.

== In animation ==
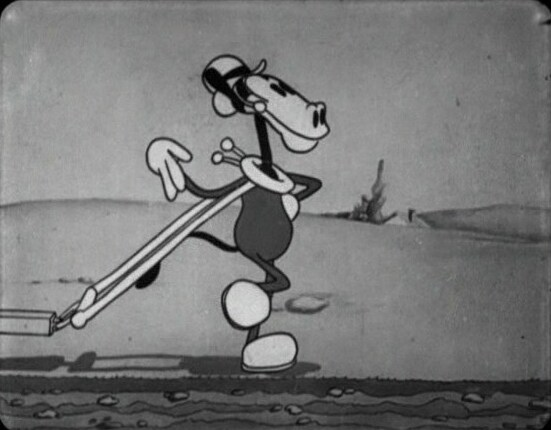
Horace Horsecollar's first appearance in The Plowboy (1929)

Horace appeared frequently in cartoons from 1930 to 1932 and less frequently afterward, making his last appearance in the original run of Disney shorts in 1942. The name of Horace's voice actor in the original shorts is unknown.

In his earliest incarnation, Horace is depicted as non-anthropomorphic, but is able to assume an anthropomorphic, bipedal form. Horace mostly played bit-parts in the over 30 films in which he appeared. Like Goofy in his early Dippy Dawg appearances, Horace's body seemed to be formed of rubber tubing. His first appearance as a completely anthropomorphic horse was in The Shindig (1930), which also featured the first love scene between Horace and Clarabelle.

Horace's biggest role was in Camping Out in 1934, where he was the star of the cartoon.

After departing the Disney studio in 1930, Ub Iwerks created a Horace-like character, the mule Orace, for his own studio; the name simply dropped the 'H' from Horace.

As with many other Disney characters, he was later given small cameos in Mickey's Christmas Carol (1983) and Who Framed Roger Rabbit (1988). He had a bigger role as the Prince's (Mickey's royal double) tutor in The Prince and the Pauper (1990).

In the television series House of Mouse, Horace has a recurring role as the club's technician, playing cartoons for the audiences and generally running the machinery.

Since 1990, Horace has been voiced by Bill Farmer, who also voices Goofy and Pluto. Farmer established the character's voice on the spot during recording for The Prince and the Pauper, when the director surprised him with the request. Asked for something "aristocratic and snobbish", he says he mixed Ben Stein and Jim Backus.

In the 1990s, Horace was intended to star in a new TV series to be created for The Disney Afternoon, titled Maximum Horsepower, intended to explain his disappearance from cartoons after the 1930s. The concept would be that, in 1939, Horace had gotten tired of playing bit parts and, after learning that Mickey was going to star in a segment of Fantasia, was going to demand Walt Disney to give him a starring role in that movie as well. On his way to Disney's office, Horace is abducted by aliens who bring him halfway across the galaxy because they are in desperate need of the hero that they believe Horace is, despite his dreams of returning to Earth and resuming his acting career. Maximum Horsepower ultimately went unproduced.

Horace has been a recurring character in the 2013 Mickey Mouse television series.

Horace has been a recurring character in Mickey Mouse Mixed-Up Adventures.

Horace appears in Mickey Mouse Funhouse, where he has different counterparts in the Adventure Worlds. His counterpart in Sportstopia has worked as an umpire, a stable boy, and a tap dance instructor. A counterpart of Horace works as a trash collector in Herotropolis alongside Hilda Hippo. A counterpart of Horace is a cowboy in Sunny Gulch. In Majestica, Horace is an ironsmith.

Horace is absent from the series Mickey Mouse Clubhouse, but appears in the revival series Mickey Mouse Clubhouse+. The episode "Minnie's Rubber Ducky Doozy" features an underwater counterpart of Horace called Horace Seahorse, who is half-seahorse.

=== Theatrical cartoon appearances ===
1. The Plowboy (1929)
2. The Jazz Fool (1929)
3. The Barnyard Concert (1930)
4. The Cactus Kid (1930)
5. The Fire Fighters (1930)
6. The Shindig (1930)
7. Pioneer Days (1930)
8. The Birthday Party (1931)
9. Blue Rhythm (1931)
10. The Barnyard Broadcast (1931)
11. The Beach Party (1931)
12. Barnyard Olympics (1932)
13. Mickey's Revue (1932)
14. The Whoopee Party (1932)
15. Touchdown Mickey (1932)
16. Mickey's Mellerdrammer (1933)
17. Mickey's Gala Premier (1933)
18. Camping Out (1934)
19. Orphan's Benefit (1934)
20. The Band Concert (1935)
21. On Ice (1935)
22. Mickey's Grand Opera (1936)
23. The Fox Hunt (1938)
24. Orphan's Benefit (remake, 1941)
25. Mickey's Birthday Party (1942)
26. Symphony Hour (1942)
27. All Together (1942)
28. Mickey's Christmas Carol (1983)
29. Who Framed Roger Rabbit (1988)
30. The Prince and the Pauper (1990)
31. Get a Horse! (2013)
32. Once Upon a Studio (2023)

== In comics ==
Horace first appeared in the Mickey Mouse comic strip on April 3, 1930. Horace has seldom been more than a supporting character, though he has starred in numerous solo stories in European comic books. In these, he plays a much bigger role than elsewhere, accompanying Mickey on his adventures or acting as Clarabelle Cow's paramour and fiance. Clarabelle and Horace were engaged in the comics according to some 1931 and 1932 continuities, but neither ever followed through.

Some modern European-made stories with Horace as a star character were published in the United States by Gemstone from 2003–2008, including:

- "King of the Bungaloos" (Walt Disney's Comics and Stories #635, 2003)
- "World's Greatest Horace" (WDC&S #641, 2004)
- "Horace's Secret Helper" (Mickey Mouse #266, 2004)
- "Horace's Travails" (MM #268, 2004)
- "Driving Clarabelle Buggy" (WDC&S #651, 2004)
- "All Aboard the Blunder Bus" (WDC&S #652, 2005)
- "Blockheads" (WDC&S #656, 2005)
- "High Horace" (WDC&S #692, 2008)
- "'Tis Better to Give Than to Deceive" (Christmas Parade #5, 2008)

Though produced in Denmark, these Horace stories were written by Americans: Stefan Petrucha, Sarah Kinney, and Don Markstein. Horace is a common co-star in modern Mickey comics by these writers.

== In video games ==
Horace appears as the DJ of the reggae song "Taiyō no Rakuen" in the 2000 Japanese Nintendo 64 game Dance Dance Revolution Disney Dancing Museum. Characters were depicted in ways intended to match the style of the songs they DJed - as part of this, Horace sports a dreadlocked wig and Caribbean clothes.

Horace appears in Mickey's Ultimate Challenge and Land of Illusion.

Horace made a cameo appearance in the Timeless River world of Kingdom Hearts II. He also makes an appearance as a resident of Disney Town in Kingdom Hearts Birth by Sleep.

Horace appears as a playable character in Disney TH!NK Fast.

Horace Horsecollar is a major character in Epic Mickey and Epic Mickey 2: The Power of Two, having become a private investigator in Wasteland. He gives Mickey a number of quests in each game, some of which involve advancing his relationship with Clarabelle.

In 2016, Horace made an appearance along with Clarabelle Cow in Disney Crossy Road as an unlockable playable character under the Mickey and Friends theme.

He appears in Disney Magic Kingdoms as a playable character available to unlock for a limited time. The game also includes a Band Uniform costume for him.

== In Disney theme parks ==
From September 2006 to September 2008, Horace Horsecollar and Clarabelle Cow appeared together for meet-and-greets in Town Square at the Magic Kingdom in Walt Disney World. Also, they were in the Main Street Family Fun Day Parade. Since Family Fun Day's ending, the two have not been easy to see outside "Mickey's Boo-to-You Halloween Parade", "Mickey's Once Upon a Christmastime Parade", and the occasional special event.

Horace and Clarabelle come out for meet-and-greets and appear in parades and shows on a regular basis at Tokyo Disneyland.

Horace Horsecollar made his meet-and-greet debut at Disneyland in Anaheim with Clarabelle Cow as part of Character Fan Days Weekend.

Horace Horsecollar is currently seen in the entrance of Buena Vista Street, near Sunset Blvd. in Disney California Adventure.

=== Parodies ===
Horace appears briefly in the episode "Who Ate Wally's Waffles?" of the series Paradise PD at the entrance of Disney World as one of the employees of the park.

== See also ==
- List of fictional horses
