= Giantland =

1933 Mickey Mouse cartoon

- Mickey arrives in Giantland
- Directed by: Burt Gillett
- Produced by: Walt Disney
- Starring: Walt Disney
- Animation by: Johnny Cannon; Les Clark; Frenchy de Tremaudan; Clyde Geronimi
- Color process: Black and white
- Production company: Walt Disney Productions
- Distributed by: United Artists
- Release date: November 25, 1933
- Running time: 8 minutes
- Country: United States
- Language: English

Giantland is a 1933 animated short film produced by Walt Disney Productions and distributed by United Artists. The film is an adaptation of the fairy tale "Jack and the Beanstalk" with Mickey Mouse in the title role. Mickey is voiced by Walt Disney and Mickey's nephews are voiced by Marcellite Garner, who at the time usually voiced Minnie Mouse. It was the 62nd Mickey Mouse short film, and the twelfth of that year.

The film was the artistic predecessor to later Disney films such as Gulliver Mickey (1934), Brave Little Tailor (1938), and Fun and Fancy Free (1947). It also marked the animated debut of Mickey's nephews, although the large number of them is inconsistent with Mickey having only two nephews (Morty and Ferdie Fieldmouse) in the comic strip.

== Plot ==
The story is book-ended with Mickey Mouse at home telling the mice children the fairy tale Jack and the Beanstalk, although he inserts himself in the role of Jack.

In the story, Mickey climbs a tall beanstalk and arrives in "Giantland", a place in the clouds where everything is larger. Mickey rides a giant butterfly to a castle and looks inside through the keyhole. Just then, the giant who lives in the castle returns home and is unaware of Mickey, who slips inside the castle. Mickey hides among the food on the dinner table as the giant sits down to eat and read a newspaper titled "EXTRA: GIANTS WIN".

When Mickey hides inside a wheel of Swiss cheese, the Giant makes a cheese sandwich and unwittingly puts Mickey into his mouth. Mickey avoids being chewed or swallowed, and eventually sabotages the giant's smoking pipe to escape. The giant tries to catch Mickey, but Mickey catapults a spoonful of pepper into the giant's face causing him to sneeze. The giant blows away the wall of the castle and Mickey runs to the beanstalk with the giant chasing after him. When Mickey reaches the bottom of the beanstalk, he sets it on fire. The giant falls down and creates a large hole in the ground.

Back at home, Mickey tells the mice children that the giant fell through the Earth to China. When Mickey asks what they thought of the story, the youngest mouse blows a raspberry into her bottle indicating that she disapproved. The episode ends with Mickey shrugging and the mice children laughing.

== Adaptations ==
In 1934, David McKay Publications published a children's book adaptation of Giantland.

Also that year, Ted Osborne wrote a storyline based on Giantland for the Mickey Mouse newspaper comic strip called "Rumpelwatt the Giant". This adaptation was the first to identify the giant by name. The artwork was by Floyd Gottfredson and Ted Thwaites.

A Game & Watch inspired minigame based on the short is featured in Kingdom Hearts III.

== Home media ==
The short was released on December 2, 2002 on Walt Disney Treasures: Mickey Mouse in Black and White.

== Legacy ==
The film was the first animated appearance of Mickey's nephews, although they had appeared in comics in 1932, in Floyd Gottfredson's Mickey Mouse Sunday strip titled Mickey's Nephews.

The premise of the film was similar to Gulliver Mickey, which was released the following year.

== See also ==
- Mickey Mouse (film series)
