= Minnie Mouse =

Disney cartoon character

- 'Mickey Mouse' character
- Minnie as she appears in a 1930 comic strip
- First appearance: Steamboat Willie (1928)
- Created by: Walt Disney; Ub Iwerks
- Designed by: Walt Disney; Ub Iwerks (original design); Fred Moore (1930s redesign)
- Voiced by: Walt Disney (1928–1929); Marjorie Ralston (1929); Marcellite Garner (1930–1936, 1941); Leone Ledoux (1936–1939; 1946–1950); Thelma Boardman (1941–1942); Ruth Clifford (1944–1952); Janet Waldo (1974); Russi Taylor (1986–2019); Kaitlyn Robrock (2019–present)

In-universe information
- Full name: Minerva Mouse
- Species: Mouse
- Gender: Female
- Family: Minnie Mouse family Fifi (dog); Figaro (cat)
- Significant other: Mickey Mouse

Minerva "Minnie" Mouse is a cartoon character created by Walt Disney and Ub Iwerks. First appearing in Steamboat Willie (1928), she is presented as the longtime sweetheart of Mickey Mouse. Minnie is an anthropomorphic mouse who is usually portrayed with white gloves, a red or pink bow, a blue, red, or pink polka-dotted dress, white bloomers and yellow low-heeled shoes which occasionally have their own ribbons.

The comic strip story "Mr. Slicker and the Egg Robbers" (published September 22 – December 26, 1930) introduced her father Marcus Mouse and her unnamed mother, both farmers. The same story featured photographs of Minnie's uncle Milton Mouse with his family and her grandparents Marvel Mouse and Matilda Mouse. Her best-known relatives, however, remain her uncle Mortimer Mouse (Mortimer was almost the name of Mickey) and her twin nieces, Millie and Melody Mouse, though most often a single niece, Melody, appears. In many appearances, Minnie is presented as the girlfriend of Mickey Mouse, the best friend to Daisy Duck and a friend to Clarabelle Cow.

In honor of her 90th anniversary, on January 22, 2018, she joined the ranks of other animated celebrities by receiving her own star on the Hollywood Walk of Fame. She was the sixth Disney character to receive this honor. Mickey Mouse, Donald Duck, Winnie the Pooh, Tinker Bell and Snow White have already received this distinction.

== History ==
=== Origins of the character ===
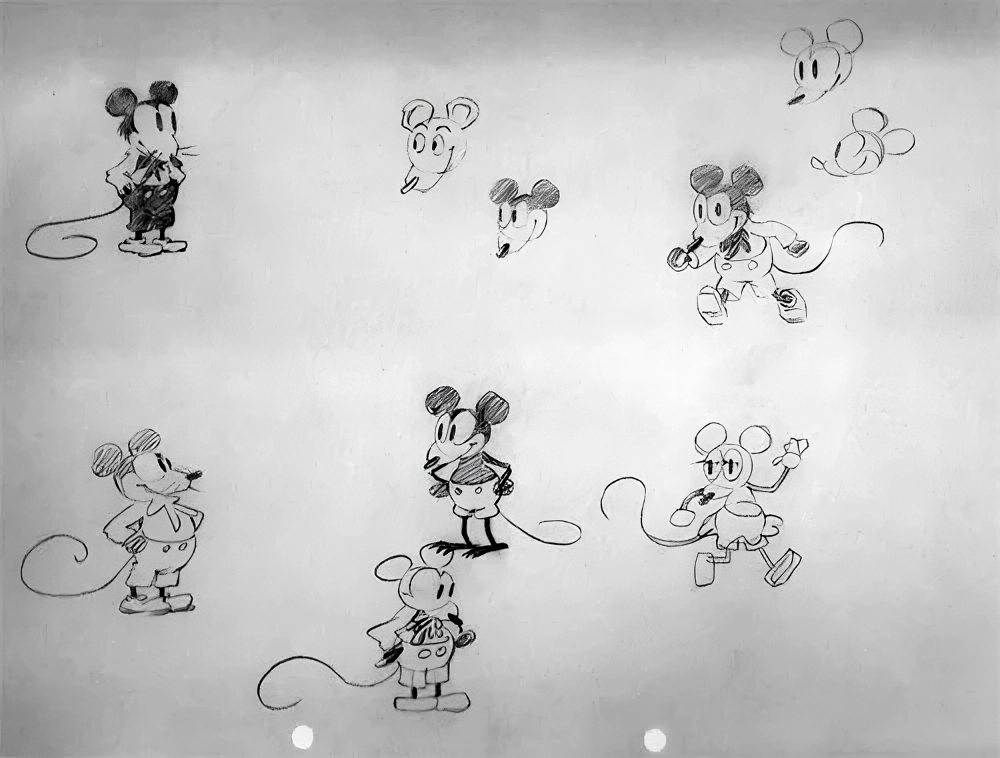
Concept art from early 1928, the drawings, which are the earliest of Mickey Mouse, also show a female version of the character (lower right), from the collection of The Walt Disney Family Museum.

Minnie Mouse as she appears in Steamboat Willie (1928), using a goat to play the song "Turkey in the Straw"

Minnie was initially created to be the love interest of Mickey Mouse; concept art for Mickey showed a female mouse alongside him.

Minnie was designed in the fashion of a flapper girl. Her main outfit consisted of a short flapper girl dress that often revealed her distinctive patched knickers. In the 1929 cartoon The Karnival Kid, it was also revealed that she wears black stockings which were also fashionable among flapper girls. Her shoes are probably her most distinctive article of clothing. For comedic effect, she wears oversized high heeled pumps that are too big for her feet. Her heels often slip out of her shoes and she even loses her shoes completely in The Gallopin' Gaucho. When she walked or danced, the clip clop of her large pumps was usually heard clearly and often went with the rhythm of the music that was played in the background. Along with Mickey, she was redesigned in 1940. Her hat was replaced with a large bow and bows were added to her shoes as well. Her eyes were also given more detail. Throughout the 1940s and 1950s, her look and personality became more conservative. Minnie almost always wears red or pink, but in her early appearances, she could be seen wearing a combination of blue, black or green (when not depicted in black and white).

Minnie's early personality is cute, playful, musical and flirtatious. In the 1930s cartoons, she proactively partakes in musical performances and sight gags while Mickey attempts to woo her to various degrees of success, with the exception of cartoons where Minnie is abducted as a damsel in distress whom Mickey tries to rescue. Her role gradually decreased to simply being Mickey's love interest as Mickey went out of favor and was reduced to cameo appearances and the occasional short.

Minnie was first seen in a test screening of the cartoon short Plane Crazy. Minnie is invited to join Mickey in the first flight of his aircraft. She accepts the invitation but not his request for a kiss in mid-flight. Mickey eventually forces Minnie into a kiss, but this only results in her parachuting out of the plane. This first film depicted Minnie as somewhat resistant to the demanding affection of her potential boyfriend and capable of escaping his grasp.

Their debut, however, featured the couple already familiar to each other. The next film featuring them was The Gallopin' Gaucho. The film was the second of their series to be produced, but the third to be released and was released on December 30, 1928. We find Minnie employed at the Cantina Argentina, a bar and restaurant established in the Pampas of Argentina. She performs the Tango for Mickey the gaucho and Black Pete the outlaw. Both flirt with her, but the latter intends to abduct her while the former obliges in saving the damsel in distress from the villain. All three characters acted as strangers first being introduced to each other.

But it was their third cartoon that established the definitive early look and personality of both Mickey and Minnie, as well as Pete. Steamboat Willie was the third short of the series to be produced, but was released first, on November 18, 1928. Pete was featured as the Captain of the steamboat, Mickey as a crew of one and Minnie as their single passenger. The two mice first star in a sound film and spend most of its duration playing music to the tune of "Turkey in the Straw".

=== Minnie's Yoo-Hoo ===
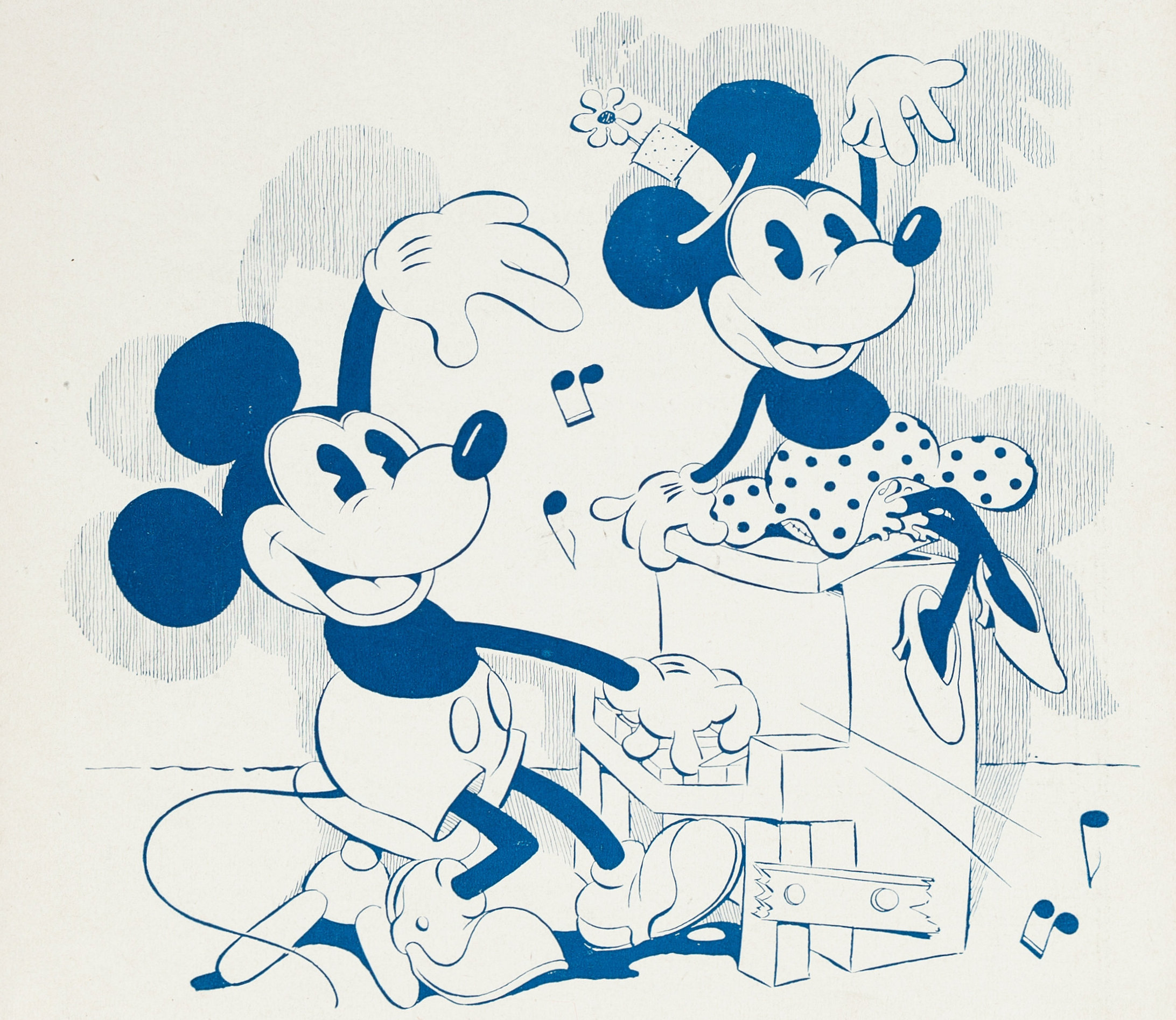
Mickey and Minnie, as they appear on a sheet music cover for Minnie's Yoo-Hoo

Her next appearance was arguably more significant. Mickey's Follies (August 28, 1929), featured the first performance of the song "Minnie's Yoo-Hoo". "The guy they call little Mickey Mouse" for the first time addresses an audience to explain that he has "got a sweetie" who is "neither fat nor skinny" and proudly proclaims that "she's my little Minnie Mouse". Mickey then proceeds to explain his reaction to Minnie's call. The song firmly establishes Mickey and Minnie as a couple and expresses the importance Minnie holds for her male partner.

=== Damsel in distress ===
Her final appearance for the year was in Wild Waves, carried by a wave into the sea. She panics terribly and seems to start drowning. Mickey uses a rowboat to rescue her and return her to the shore, but Minnie is still visibly shaken from the experience. Mickey starts singing the tune of "Rocked in the Cradle of the Deep", a maritime ballad, in an apparent effort to cheer her up. Minnie cheers up and the short ends. This is the second time Minnie is placed in danger and then saved by her new boyfriend. It would not be the last.

In fact, this was the case with her next appearance in The Cactus Kid (May 10, 1930). As the title implies, the short was intended as a Western movie parody, but it is considered to be more or less a remake of The Gallopin' Gaucho set in Mexico instead of Argentina. Minnie was again cast as the local tavern dancer who is abducted by Peg-Leg Pedro (Black Pete in his first appearance with a peg-leg). Mickey again comes to the rescue. The short is considered significant for being the last short featuring Mickey and Minnie to be animated by Ub Iwerks.

The Shindig (July 11, 1930) featured Minnie joining Mickey, Horace and Clarabelle in a barn dance. Among them, Clarabelle seems to be the actual star of the short. Director Burt Gillett turned in another enjoyable entry in the series, proving that production could go on without Iwerks. This was arguably the first time Minnie was upstaged by a female co-star.

In The Fire Fighters (June 20, 1930), Minnie is trapped in a hotel during a fire. She spends the duration of the short in mortal peril but is rescued by firefighters under Chief Mickey Mouse. Horace Horsecollar is among the firefighters. An unnamed cow in the background is possibly Clarabelle making a cameo. The music of the short was, appropriately, the tune of "There'll Be a Hot Time in the Old Town Tonight".

The next entry in the series is considered curious: The Gorilla Mystery (October 1, 1930). The short starts with Beppo the Gorilla escaping from a zoo. Mickey learns of it and terribly panics. He phones Minnie to warn her about the dangerous gorilla wandering about. Minnie is unconcerned and plays tunes on her piano for Mickey to hear over the phone and know she is not afraid. Her tunes are interrupted by her scream and Mickey rushes to her house to save her. Meanwhile, Beppo has wrapped up Minnie in rope and holds her hostage. Mickey confronts the gorilla and once again rescues the damsel in distress.

=== Introduction of a pet ===
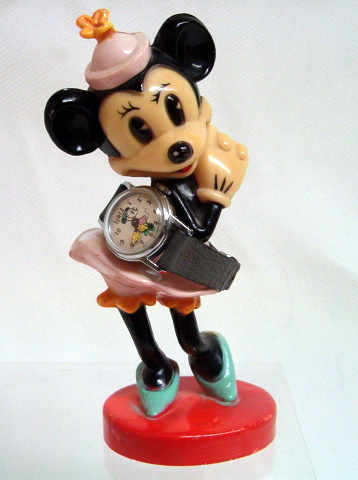
Vintage Minnie Mouse clock, c. 1958

In The Picnic (1930), Minnie introduces her boyfriend to her new pet dog, Rover. This is actually Pluto making his first appearance as an individual character. Two unnamed bloodhound guard dogs strikingly similar to him had previously appeared in The Chain Gang (August 18, 1930) which featured Mickey incarcerated in prison without Minnie at his side. Otherwise, the short features a typical picnic excursion harassed by forest animals and brought to a premature end by a sudden rain.

The final appearance of Minnie during the year was Pioneer Days (November 20, 1930). The short featured Minnie and her mate as pioneer settlers heading to the American Old West driving a covered wagon in a wagon train. They are unsurprisingly attacked by Native Americans on their way, this was a stock plot of Western movies at the time. While their fellows are either subjected to scalping or running for their lives, Minnie is captured by the attackers. Mickey attempts to rescue her, only to be captured himself. In a reversal of their usual roles, Minnie escapes her captors and rescues her mate. They then dress as soldiers of the United States Army. Their mere appearance proves sufficient to have the entire tribe running for the hills. The Mouse couple stands triumphant at the end. The short has been criticized for its unflattering depiction of Native Americans as rather bestial predators. The finale has been edited out in recent viewings for depicting the "braves" submitting to cowardice.

In several shorts, comics and TV shows, Minnie owns a black and white kitten named Figaro, who had originated in the Disney animated feature Pinocchio.

=== Waning years ===
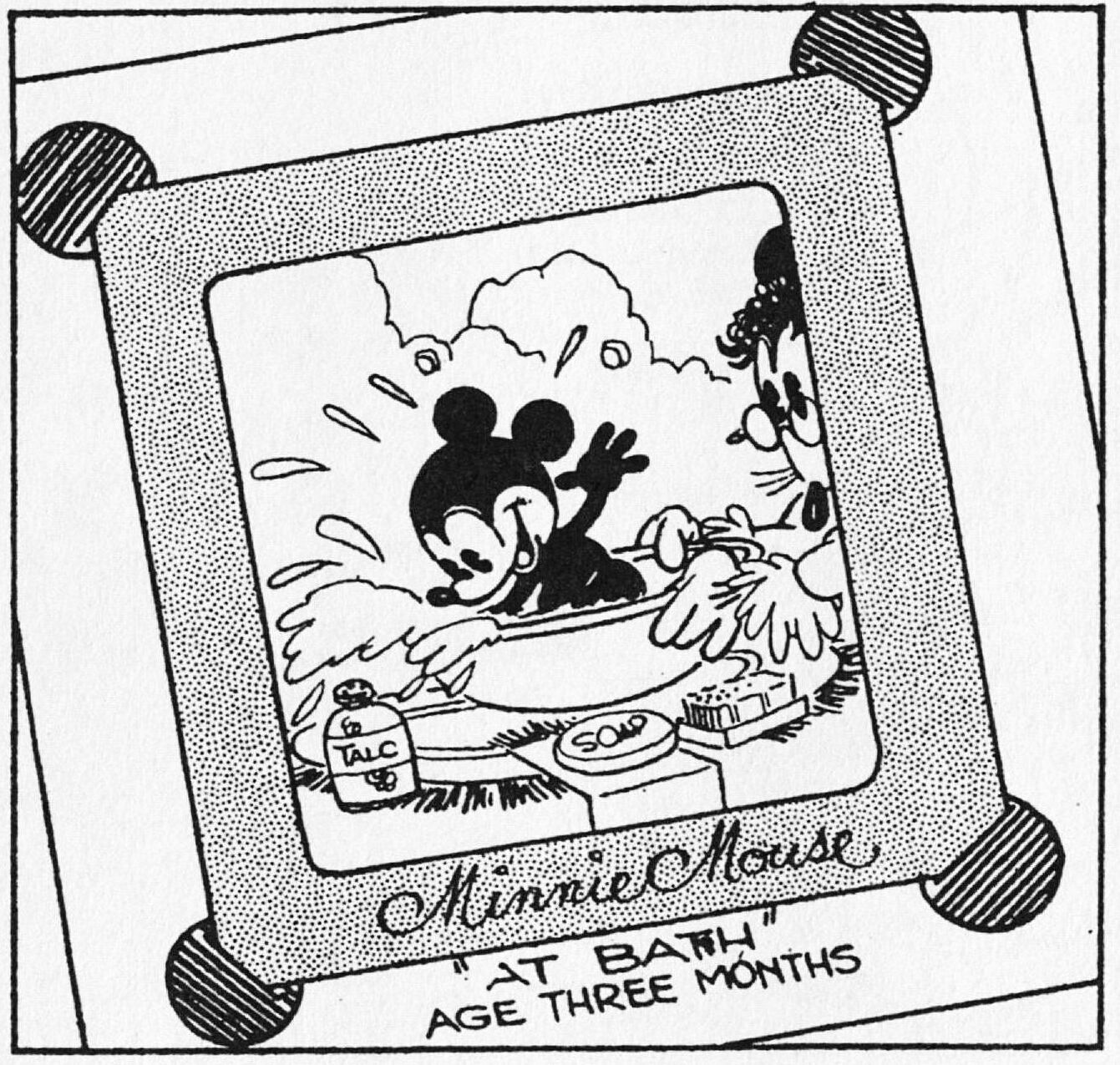
Minnie as a baby in the Mickey Mouse comic strip dated October 15, 1930

During the second half of the 1930s, Minnie did not appear as often in Mickey cartoons. This was mainly due to the growth in popularity of Mickey's new sidekicks, Goofy, Donald Duck and Pluto, whose appearances in Mickey cartoons had more or less replaced Minnie's role. Minnie's appearances in Mickey cartoons thus became less numerous, but she did have a few major roles in some Pluto and Figaro cartoons during the 1940s. Minnie made a sort of comeback in the 1980s when she was re-introduced in Mickey's Christmas Carol and then got her own starring role in Totally Minnie.

=== Contemporary appearances ===
- She starred in a 1988 musical television special on NBC called Totally Minnie, it was the first film to feature Minnie in a lead role. She also appeared in a line of merchandise called Minnie 'n Me in the 1990s. On September 18, 1990, the CD Minnie 'n Me: Songs Just For Girls was released.
- Minnie's return to animation came in Mickey's Christmas Carol (December 16, 1983). She was cast as Mrs. Cratchit. As with most Disney characters, she was given a small cameo in Who Framed Roger Rabbit (1988) but does not have any lines in the latter movie, despite her voice actress being listed in the end credits.
- Minnie Mouse makes an appearance in nearly every episode of Mickey Mouse Clubhouse.
- Minnie ran a neighborhood in Disney's Toontown Online called Minnie's Melodyland. It was an intermediate area with access to Toontown Central, The Brrrgh and Donald's Dreamland.
- Minnie is available to sign autographs and take pictures throughout the day in various locations at the different Disney Resort Theme Parks around the world. She also appears in all of the daily parades that take place at the Disney resorts.
- In the 2013 Mickey Mouse television series, Minnie was restored to her classic 1930s look with the flowered bowler hat and flapper girl outfit. Minnie also gained more character quirks, and like the older cartoons, was subject to more slapstick and rubber hose cartoon gags.
- On June 22, 2017, it was announced that Minnie, alongside "Weird Al" Yankovic, Zoe Saldaña and Lin-Manuel Miranda, would be receiving a star on the Hollywood Walk of Fame in 2018.
- In December 2019, Minnie and Mickey served as special co-hosts of Wheel of Fortune for two weeks during Disney's Secret Santa Giveaway while Vanna White served as the main host during Pat Sajak's absence.

On January 1, 2024, the copyrights of the first three animated Mickey Mouse cartoons and their portrayal of Mickey and Minnie Mouse expired, and they entered the public domain. They are the silent versions of the cartoons Plane Crazy and The Gallopin' Gaucho, and the sound cartoon Steamboat Willie. (Note: While Plane Crazy's silent version became public domain, that version is unknown to be extant. The widely released sound version entered the public domain in 2025.) Newer versions of Minnie Mouse remained copyright protected. On January 1, 2025, the sound versions mentioned above, and another twelve cartoons and their depictions of Minnie became public domain.

== Television ==
In Mickey Mouse Works, she appeared in her own segments. Occasionally, she starred in Maestro Minnie shorts, in which she conducts an orchestra of living instruments that she usually has to tame.

In House of Mouse, Minnie is in charge of running the nightclub, while Mickey primarily serves as the host. In one episode of House of Mouse, "Clarabelle's Big Secret", Minnie reveals that she has gone to the movies with Mortimer Mouse, although it is not a date.

She appears in two children's shows on Disney Jr.: the full-length educational Mickey Mouse Clubhouse and the spin-off series of shorts Minnie's Bow-Toons, where she runs a "bow-tique" selling bows like the ones she and Daisy wear.

In the 2013 Mickey Mouse television series and its 2020 spinoff The Wonderful World of Mickey Mouse, she exhibits the ability to survive her head coming off, doing a 360 degree flip and re-attaching itself, which can happen when she feels surprised.

In 2017, as part of the launch of Mickey Mouse Mixed-Up Adventures, Minnie's Happy Helpers adventures appear in the second half of every new episode.

== Minnie as a queen and princess ==
Minnie has had several appearances as a princess throughout the ages, including the Mickey Mouse short films Ye Olden Days (1933) and Brave Little Tailor (1938).

=== Kingdom Hearts series ===
Minnie appears in the Kingdom Hearts game series as the queen of Disney Castle, with Mickey serving as the king and her husband. She, at the suggestion of a letter left by the missing King, sends Donald Duck and Goofy on their mission to find Mickey and the Keyblade Master, Sora. During Kingdom Hearts II, when Pete's tampering of the past causes the Heartless to appear in Disney Castle, Minnie is forced to fall back to the library up until Sora and company arrive. While Donald and Goofy head out to get the other residents to safety, Sora protects Minnie so that she can get to the Cornerstone of Light. During this time, Minnie shows powers as a sorceress of white magic, casting a holy light on the Heartless that attack. In the prequel Kingdom Hearts Birth by Sleep, she oversees the annual Dream Festival in Disney Town, where Pete causes mischief until she banishes him to another dimension. Minnie appears in Kingdom Hearts 3D: Dream Drop Distance as the ruler of the Country of the Musketeers, a world based on the film Mickey, Donald, Goofy: The Three Musketeers. She makes a brief appearance in Kingdom Hearts III, welcoming Mickey, Donald and Goofy back to Disney Castle.

=== Mickey, Donald, Goofy: The Three Musketeers ===
In the 2004 direct-to-video film Mickey, Donald, Goofy: The Three Musketeers, Minnie plays the role of the princess of France, who continually daydreams about her true love, Mickey. She is also the only monarch getting in the way of the plans of Pete, who can not take over the kingdom if he can not get rid of her. For this particular film, Minnie is drawn with hair bangs, which do not appear in any later cartoons.

=== Wizards of Mickey ===
In the fantasy comic series Wizards of Mickey, Minnie is the sorceress princess of the kingdom of Dolmen whose people have been turned to stone, leading her to seek a magical Crystal to restore them. In her quest, she partners with her friends Daisy and Clarabelle as team Diamond Moon and eventually meets up with Mickey, the Supreme Sorcerer of Dolmen, and his group.

== Voice actors ==
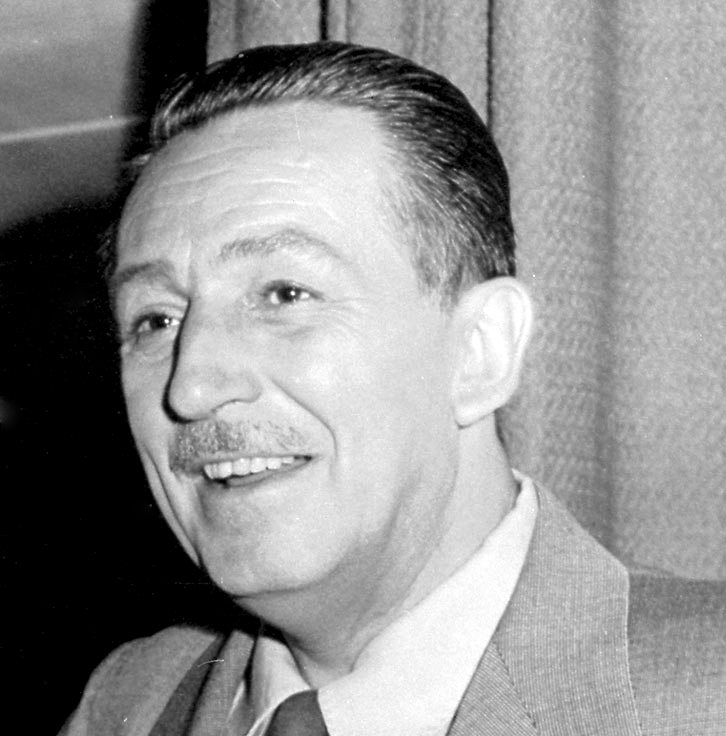
Walt Disney was one of the main creators of Minnie Mouse and her voice actor during the mid-to-late 1920s.

Minnie Mouse was first voiced by Walt Disney, who was also the original voice of Mickey Mouse.

Marjorie Ralston, a Disney inker who joined the animation team as Disney's thirteenth employee, voiced Minnie in The Barn Dance, Mickey's Choo-Choo and Wild Waves, but did not further pursue the role out of shyness. Gloria Narath voiced Minnie in The Plowboy and The Barn Dance. From 1929 up until 1941, Minnie was voiced by Marcellite Garner. Carol Tevis, Bernice Hansen and Shirley Reed voiced her in guest radio appearances. From 1936 to 1939 and 1946 to 1950, Minnie was voiced by Leone LeDoux. From 1941 to 1942 and on the radio program, The Mickey Mouse Theater of the Air, she was voiced by Thelma Boardman. Boardman also voiced her in the short Mickey's Birthday Party in 1942. Shirley Reed voiced Minnie in Two-Gun Mickey except the end. Following this, from 1950 to 1952, Ruth Clifford provided the character's voice. Janet Waldo voiced Minnie in the 1974 Disneyland record album, An Adaptation of Dickens' Christmas Carol, Performed by The Walt Disney Players. In the 1980s, choreographer Barnette Ricci voiced Minnie for live entertainment offerings in the parks, Disney on Ice shows, and live-action clips for television. Deborah Gates voiced Minnie for commercials, toys, and records in 1985-1987, including the album Totally Minnie.

In 1986, Russi Taylor inherited the role of Minnie, which she performed up until her death in 2019 (her husband, Wayne Allwine, voiced Mickey from 1977 up until his death in 2009). Taylor's voice is used in various TV series and theme parks via archival and posthumous dialogue. Kaitlyn Robrock officially took over as the new voice of Minnie, beginning with two Disney Jr. stop-motion Mickey Mouse shorts, Mickey Mouse and the Magical Snowy Holiday and Mickey Mouse and the Magical Holiday Bag, both released in November 2019.

Robrock continues voicing Minnie in The Wonderful World of Mickey Mouse on Disney+.

== Appearances in cartoon shorts ==
1. Plane Crazy (1928)
2. Steamboat Willie (1928)
3. The Gallopin' Gaucho (1928)
4. The Barn Dance (1929)
5. When the Cat's Away (1929)
6. The Plowboy (1929)
7. The Karnival Kid (1929)
8. Mickey's Follies (1929)
9. Mickey's Choo-Choo (1929)
10. Wild Waves (1929)
11. The Cactus Kid (1930)
12. The Fire Fighters (1930)
13. The Shindig (1930)
14. The Gorilla Mystery (1930)
15. The Picnic (1930)
16. Pioneer Days (1930)
17. The Birthday Party (1931)
18. Traffic Troubles (1931)
19. The Delivery Boy (1931)
20. Mickey Steps Out (1931)
21. Blue Rhythm (1931)
22. The Barnyard Broadcast (1931)
23. The Beach Party (1931)
24. Mickey Cuts Up (1931)
25. Mickey's Orphans (1931)
26. The Grocery Boy (1932)
27. Barnyard Olympics (1932)
28. Mickey's Revue (1932)
29. Musical Farmer (1932)
30. Mickey in Arabia (1932)
31. Mickey's Nightmare (1932)
32. The Whoopee Party (1932)
33. Touchdown Mickey (1932)
34. The Wayward Canary (1932)
35. The Klondike Kid (1932)
36. Building a Building (1933)
37. Mickey's Pal Pluto (1933)
38. Mickey's Mellerdrammer (1933)
39. Ye Olden Days (1933)
40. The Mail Pilot (1933)
41. Mickey's Mechanical Man (1933)
42. Mickey's Gala Premier (1933)
43. Puppy Love (1933)
44. The Steeplechase (1933)
45. The Pet Store (1933)
46. Shanghaied (1934)
47. Camping Out (1934)
48. Mickey's Steamroller (1934)
49. Two-Gun Mickey (1934)
50. On Ice (1935)
51. Mickey's Rival (1936)
52. Hawaiian Holiday (1937)
53. Boat Builders (1938)
54. Brave Little Tailor (1938)
55. The Fox Hunt (1938, cameo)
56. Mickey's Surprise Party (1939, in a commercial short)
57. The Little Whirlwind (1941)
58. The Nifty Nineties (1941)
59. Mickey's Birthday Party (1942)
60. Out of the Frying Pan and into the Firing Line (1942, in a Pluto short)
61. First Aiders (1944, in a Pluto short)
62. Bath Day (1946, in a Figaro short)
63. Figaro and Frankie (1947, in a Figaro short)
64. Mickey's Delayed Date (1947)
65. Pluto's Sweater (1949, in a Pluto short)
66. Pluto and the Gopher (1950, in a Pluto short)
67. Crazy Over Daisy (1950, cameo in a Donald Duck short)
68. Pluto's Christmas Tree (1952)
69. Mickey's Christmas Carol (1983, non-speaking appearance)
70. Runaway Brain (1995)
71. Get a Horse! (2013)
72. Once Upon a Studio (2023)

== Television appearances ==
- Walt Disney anthology television series (1954–2008)
  - Totally Minnie (1988)
  - Mickey's 60th Birthday (1988)
- The Mickey Mouse Club (1955–1959; 1977–1979; 1989–1994)
- Mickey Mouse Works (1999–2000)
- House of Mouse (2001–2003)
- Mickey Mouse Clubhouse (2006–2016)
  - Minnie's Bow-Toons (2011–present)
- Mickey Mouse (2013–2019)
- Mickey Mouse Mixed-Up Adventures (2017–2021)
- Mickey's 90th Spectacular (2018)
- The Wonderful World of Mickey Mouse (2020–2023)
- Mickey Mouse Funhouse (2021–2025)
- Mickey's Tale of Two Witches (2021)
- Mickey and Minnie Wish Upon a Christmas (2021)
- Mickey Saves Christmas (2022)
- Mickey and Friends Trick or Treats (2023)
- Mickey and the Very Many Christmases (2024)
- Mickey Mouse Clubhouse+ (2025–present)
