= Mickey's Birthday Party =

1942 Mickey Mouse cartoon

- Theatrical release poster
- Directed by: Riley Thomson
- Produced by: Walt Disney
- Starring: Walt Disney; Thelma Boardman; Pinto Colvig; Clarence Nash; Florence Gill
- Animation by: Character animation: Marvin Woodward; J. Moore; Bernie Wolf; Kenneth Muse; Riley Thomson; Les Clark
- Color process: Technicolor
- Production company: Walt Disney Productions
- Distributed by: RKO Radio Pictures
- Release date: February 7, 1942
- Running time: 7:58
- Country: United States
- Language: English

Mickey's Birthday Party is an American animated short film directed by Riley Thomson, produced by Walt Disney Productions and distributed by RKO Radio Pictures. The 114th short to feature Mickey Mouse, it was released on February 7, 1942. The animated film was directed by Riley Thomson and animated by Les Clark, James Moore, Ken Muse, Armin Shaffair, Riley Thompson, Bernie Wolf, and Marvin Woodward. It was the 116th short in the Mickey Mouse film series to be released, and the first for that year.

== Plot ==
Minnie Mouse, Donald Duck, Goofy, Clarabelle Cow, Horace Horsecollar, and Clara Cluck throw a big birthday party for Mickey. He is given an electric organ as a gift, and he dances a wild rhumba while Minnie plays. Meanwhile, Goofy tries baking a cake, but keeps messing it up. When Minnie comes in to check on his progress, Goofy covers his tracks and tells her that the cake is going fine. Meanwhile, Donald, dressed in a sombrero and a scarf, dances with Clara, whose wild, exuberant dancing exhaust Donald. Eventually, Goofy buys a cake from the bakery. Clara in her exuberance, shakes the tired Donald so much, she inadvertently flings him out of his shirt onto the chandelier. Goofy accidentally throws the cake on Mickey as everyone sings "Happy Birthday to You", but Mickey smiles regardless.

== Voice cast ==
- Walt Disney as Mickey Mouse
- Thelma Boardman as Minnie Mouse
- Pinto Colvig as Goofy
- Clarence Nash as Donald Duck
- Florence Gill as Clara Cluck
- Elvia Allman as Clarabelle Cow

== Production ==
This short is an update of the 1931 black and white short The Birthday Party. The 1931 version only had Mickey Mouse, Minnie Mouse, Clarabelle Cow and Horace Horsecollar, since none of the other characters existed at the time.

It also has some marks of 1932's The Whoopee Party.

Some of the animation of Mickey's wild dance was actually originally done by Ward Kimball for The Reluctant Dragon, not only used in the film.

== Home media ==
The short was released on May 18, 2004, on Walt Disney Treasures: Mickey Mouse in Living Color, Volume Two: 1939-Today.

== Legacy ==
Goofy wears the same clothes from this short in the How to Stay at Home short, "Learning to Cook" (2021).

Mickey's outfit and birthday cake are on display as props from the short in the queue of the Mickey & Minnie's Runaway Railway attraction at Disneyland.

The characters present in the story wear the same clothes from the short in the 2023 short film Once Upon a Studio.

== See also ==
- Mickey Mouse (film series)
