= Walt Disney Treasures: Wave Two =

DVD collections

The second "wave" of Walt Disney Treasures was released December 3, 2002. This was the final wave with the tin's individual number embossed on the tin. 125,000 sets were produced.

== Mickey Mouse in Black and White ==

This set displays 34 Mickey Mouse cartoons in black and white.

=== Disc one ===
==== 1928 ====
- Steamboat Willie
- The Gallopin' Gaucho
- Plane Crazy

==== 1929 ====
- The Karnival Kid
- Mickey's Follies

==== 1930 ====
- The Fire Fighters
- The Chain Gang
- The Gorilla Mystery
- Pioneer Days

==== 1931 ====
- The Birthday Party
- Mickey Steps Out
- Blue Rhythm
- Mickey Cuts Up
- Mickey's Orphans

==== 1932 ====
- The Duck Hunt
- Mickey's Revue
- Mickey's Nightmare
- The Whoopee Party
- Touchdown Mickey
- The Klondike Kid

==== Bonus features ====
- Frank and Ollie... and Mickey: An interview between Leonard Maltin and two of the most legendary Disney artists of all time, Frank Thomas and Ollie Johnston. Even though they joined the Disney team towards the end of Mickey's days in black and white, they have a lot to say about what the character meant to them, both before and during their days with Disney.
- Two Story Scripts: These scripts first provide a look at a complete panel and then a close-up of the text and the picture on each panel. The two scripts are for "Steamboat Willie" and "Mickey Steps Out".
- Story Sketches: Various story sketch sequences from some of the cartoons presented on this disc.
- The Mickey Mouse Club: Easter egg bonus involving the Mickey Mouse Club, not the more familiar TV show of the 1950s, but an actual club popping up across the nation in 1930's. This supplement takes viewers inside those club meetings via a newsreel profiling them during the era. There is also a short that was created by Disney exclusively for these clubs: a sing-along to "Minnie's Yoo Hoo" with Mickey Mouse, complete with a second verse.

=== Disc two ===
==== 1933 ====
- Building a Building
- The Mad Doctor
- Ye Olden Days
- The Mail Pilot
- Mickey's Gala Premier
- Puppy Love
- The Pet Store
- Giantland

==== 1934 ====
- Camping Out
- Gulliver Mickey
- Orphan's Benefit
- The Dognapper
- Two-Gun Mickey

==== 1935 ====
- Mickey's Service Station

==== Bonus features ====
- Pencil Test From The Mail Pilot: The cartoon short played in the preliminary pencil phase.
- Story Sketches: More story sketch sequences from some of the cartoons presented on this disc.
- Poster Gallery: A variety of posters of many of the cartoons presented on this set.

== The Complete Goofy ==

This set provides a look at all of the cartoons involving the career of Goofy prior to its release, except for How to Ride a Horse (1941) (a segment from The Reluctant Dragon) (although the original theatrical poster is included in the Disc 2 gallery), El Gaucho Goofy (1943) (a segment from the package film Saludos Amigos), Freewayphobia #1 (1965), Goofy's Freeway Trouble (1965), and Sport Goofy in Soccermania (TV special) (1987).

The "Donald & Goofy" shorts Polar Trappers (1938), The Fox Hunt (1938), Billposters (1940), No Sail (1945), Frank Duck Brings 'em Back Alive (1946), and Crazy with the Heat (1947) are instead included on The Chronological Donald, Volume 1, Volume 2 and Volume 3, respectively, because they have always been put under Donald Duck's filmography, not Goofy's.

In addition to the commentary provided by Leonard Maltin for some of the galleries on Disc 2, Goofy himself (voiced by Bill Farmer) provides some comments on others.

=== Disc one ===
==== 1939 ====
- Goofy and Wilbur

==== 1940 ====
- Goofy's Glider

==== 1941 ====
- Baggage Buster
- The Art of Skiing
- The Art of Self Defense

==== 1942 ====
- How to Play Baseball
- The Olympic Champ
- How to Swim
- How to Fish

==== 1943 ====
- Victory Vehicles

==== 1944 ====
- How to Be a Sailor
- How to Play Golf
- How to Play Football

==== 1945 ====
- Tiger Trouble
- African Diary
- Californy'er Bust
- Hockey Homicide

==== 1946 ====
- A Knight For a Day
- Double Dribble

==== 1947 ====
- Foul Hunting

==== 1948 ====
- They're Off
- The Big Wash

==== Bonus features ====
- The Essential Goof: Using a montage of clips from the various Goofy shorts on this set, the analysis of the character, as spoken by the one who originally drew him, Art Babbitt (who also created the Big Bad Wolf and the balletic mushrooms in Fantasia) is repeated here. You can view the entire analysis on the article on Goofy by clicking here. Incidentally, Art's narration is actually spoken by Earl Boen.
- The Man Behind the Goof: A mini-biography about the original voice of Goofy, Pinto Colvig. This biography reveals that in his youth, Colvig loved to travel with the circus, where he'd perform as a clown. He spent much of his life at Disney where in addition to voicing Goofy, he'd also voiced Pluto, the Practical Pig, the Grasshopper in The Grasshopper and the Ants (where Colvig, as the grasshopper, sang "The World Owes Me a Livin'", which he'd later add to Goofy) and two of the Seven Dwarfs (specifically, Grumpy and Sleepy). He also left Disney temporarily to voice Gabby at Max Fleischer's studios, but later returned to Disney where he'd spend the rest of his life voicing Goofy. He also was the original Bozo the Clown for Capitol Records on records, radio and television.

=== Disc two ===
==== 1949 ====
- Tennis Racquet
- Goofy Gymnastics

==== 1950 ====
- Motor Mania
- Hold That Pose

==== 1951 ====
- Lion Down
- Home Made Home
- Cold War
- Tomorrow We Diet
- Get Rich Quick
- Fathers Are People
- No Smoking

==== 1952 ====
- Father's Lion
- Hello Aloha
- Man's Best Friend
- Two-Gun Goofy
- Teachers Are People
- Two Weeks Vacation
- How to Be a Detective

==== 1953 ====
- Father's Day Off
- For Whom the Bulls Toil
- Father's Week End
- How to Dance
- How to Sleep

==== 1961 ====
- Aquamania

==== Bonus features ====
- A Conversation With Goofy's Voice: Bill Farmer: As the title implies, Maltin interviews the present voice of Goofy, Bill Farmer, who had been voicing Goofy since 1986. Farmer reveals his origins and how he came to voice Goofy. It is revealed that Farmer had voiced Goofy in more than 3000 different Disney projects, not only cartoons, but also albums, telephones, commercials and many others.
- Poster Gallery: Many of the posters of the Goofy shorts are presented here. Goofy provides the commentary here.
- Memorabilia Gallery: This gallery shows off various Goofy memorabilia, such as books and albums.
- Goofy Through the Years Gallery: This gallery reveals storyboard sketches, animation drawings and background paintings of many of the Goofy shorts presented. Goofy again provides commentary.

== Behind the Scenes at the Walt Disney Studio ==

This set provides a history of the Walt Disney Studios and of animation from the days of the caveman to the present. Along with a tour of the studios, some Disney animators are introduced and the process of producing films at Disney is covered. Most of the contents are from Walt Disney anthology series.

=== Disc one ===
==== Films ====
- A Trip Through the Walt Disney Studios (1937): This short documentary film, made by Disney at the request of then-distributor RKO Radio Pictures, explores the promotion of Snow White and the Seven Dwarfs. It offers a look at the film as well as a behind-the-scenes visit to the Disney Studio for an introduction to the artists and animators and their process. This film first appeared in 2001 on the 2-disc Snow White Platinum Edition DVD set.
- How Walt Disney Cartoons Are Made (1938): This promotional film, which also first appeared on the Snow White Platinum Edition DVD set in 2001, is a more family-friendly version of A Trip Through the Walt Disney Studios.
- The Reluctant Dragon (1941): This film features actor and humorist Robert Benchley wandering through the new and improved Disney Studios in Burbank to try to find Walt, in hopes of selling him on the idea of making a film of Kenneth Grahame's book, The Reluctant Dragon. He explores an art class, dialogue and sound effects stages, the multiplane camera department, the paint department and, finally, the story and animation departments until finally he discovers Disney has already finished the cartoon version of the story.

==== Bonus features ====
- Leonard Maltin's Studio Tour: Maltin provides a history of the studio, from the days of the Alice Comedies to the present day.
- Behind the Boards on Baby Weems: An interview with longtime Disney story man and artist Joe Grant. Maltin discusses how Grant got his start at the studio and the unusual story-reel format of the "Baby Weems" short seen in The Reluctant Dragon. Grant reveals that "Weems" and the "Dragon" shorts from the film were both originally considered for full-length theatrical releases, but ultimately didn't warrant the longer running time.
- The Reluctant Dragon Gallery: Promotional black-and-white stills of the film and its actors.
- Studio Gallery: Photos of the old Hyperion lot.

=== Disc two ===
==== Films ====
- The Story of the Animated Drawing: On this 1955 episode of the Disney anthology series, Walt serves as the delightful host as he discusses the history of animation from the days of the caveman to the days of some primitive mechanical animation contraptions in the 1800s that were used to experiment with the art form. Then it moves on to more advance types of animation experiments, such as in J. Stuart Blackton's Humorous Phases of Funny Faces, Winsor McCay's Gertie the Dinosaur and even a demonstration of how music was synchronized into cartoons in the early days of the cinema.
- The Plausible Impossible: On this 1956 episode of the anthology series, Walt explains how his animators make the impossible seem realistic through various cartoons with Mickey and Donald. This episode also includes a pencil-test form of one scene from Snow White that was ultimately not used in the final film.
- Tricks of our Trade: On this 1957 episode of the anthology series, Walt dwells on how animators study real life to create their illustrations. Examples are given from Fantasia on following a live ballerina to draw the animals' movements in Dance of the Hours, and copying actual bubbles to produce the boiling lava in The Rite of Spring. The groundbreaking multiplane camera is shown off, demonstrating how it is used to mimic real landscapes, since plain animated backgrounds seem to be too plain and create a false effect.

==== Bonus features ====
- Kem Weber Gallery: This gallery has architectural concept art for the Burbank lot.
- Tour of the Disney Studio: This is a rare half-hour radio broadcast from Australia in 1946, in which studio personnel Homer Brightman, Harry Reeves, Eric Larson and Walt himself offer general information on the making of the animated films at the time.
