= Mickey's Steam-Roller =

1934 Mickey Mouse cartoon

- Theatrical release poster rough draft, showing the working title The Steamroller.
- Directed by: David Hand
- Produced by: Walt Disney
- Starring: Walt Disney; Marcellite Garner
- Music by: Bert Lewis
- Animation by: Jack Bailey; Norm Ferguson; Bob Kuwahara; Fred Moore; Bob Wickersham
- Color process: Black and white, later colorized
- Production company: Walt Disney Productions
- Distributed by: United Artists
- Release date: June 16, 1934
- Running time: 7 minutes
- Country: United States
- Language: English

Mickey's Steam-Roller is a 1934 animated short film produced by Walt Disney Productions and released by United Artists. In the cartoon, Mickey Mouse is the driver of a steamroller which is hijacked by his two nephews. It was directed by David Hand and features the voices of Walt Disney as Mickey and Marcellite Garner as Minnie Mouse and Mickey's nephews. It was the 67th Mickey Mouse short film to be released, and the fifth of that year.

Although this is the third animated appearance of Mickey's nephews, it is the first to show only two of them. The film is therefore considered the first identifiable and most significant animated appearance of Morty and Ferdie Fieldmouse, Mickey's twin nephews from the Mickey Mouse comic strip.

The film was also called The Steamroller during production. It was called Mickey's Steamroller and Mickey's Steam Roller in its re-releases.

== Plot ==
Mickey Mouse drives an anthropomorphic steamroller while a group of dogface workmen perform road maintenance. Meanwhile, Minnie Mouse appears as the nanny of a young Morty and Ferdie Fieldmouse, pushing them in a stroller and singing "Pease Porridge Hot". Mickey drives by and they wave at him. Mickey stops and gives the boys a ride with the steamroller by attaching the vehicle's tow rope to their stroller.

After this, Mickey flirts with Minnie by giving her some Sweethearts candy and tries to steal a kiss. While they are distracted, Morty and Ferdie climb onto Mickey's steamroller and drive it away. Mickey frantically runs after the nephews, but when he attempts to cut them off, he finds himself being chased instead.

The nephews go on to cause extensive damage with the steamroller. Finally they chase Mickey into a multistory hotel, destroying the entire building except for the bathtub on each floor, each with a current bather. Unhurt in the rubble, Mickey laughs as Morty and Ferdie see-saw on a board balanced on his head.

== Voice cast ==
- Mickey Mouse: Walt Disney
- Minnie Mouse: Marcellite Garner
- Mickey's Nephews: Beatrice Hagen and Jayne Shadduck

== Releases ==
- 1934 - theatrical release
- 1955 - The Mickey Mouse Club (TV)
- 1997 - Ink & Paint Club, episode 23: "The 'Other' Mice" (TV)

== Home media ==
The short was released on December 7, 2004, on Walt Disney Treasures: Mickey Mouse in Black and White, Volume Two: 1929-1935. It was released to Disney+ on August 11, 2023.

Additional releases include:

- 2007 "Vintage Mickey" (DVD)

== See also ==
- Mickey's Choo-Choo
- Mickey Mouse (film series)
