= Puppy Love (1933 film) =

1933 film by Wilfred Jackson

- Directed by: Wilfred Jackson
- Produced by: Walt Disney
- Starring: Walt Disney
- Color process: Black and white
- Production company: Walt Disney Productions
- Distributed by: United Artists
- Release date: September 2, 1933
- Running time: 7 min
- Country: United States
- Language: English

Puppy Love is a 1933 American animated short film directed by Wilfred Jackson. It is the 59th film of the Mickey Mouse film series. It is the first appearance of Fifi the Peke, one of Pluto's love interests.

== Plot ==
Mickey Mouse and Pluto pay visits to their respective sweethearts, Minnie Mouse and Fifi. While Mickey and Minnie are preoccupied playing the piano (playing the song "Puppy Love"), Pluto steals the box of chocolates that Mickey brought for Minnie and gives it to Fifi. He then replaces the chocolate with a bone and returns the box. Both relationships turn cold when Minnie finds the bone, but she later discovers the half-eaten chocolate and reconciles with Mickey.

== Home media ==
The short was released on December 2, 2002, on Walt Disney Treasures: Mickey Mouse in Black and White.

== See also ==
- Mickey Mouse (film series)
