= Marcellite Garner =

American artist and voice actress (1910–1993)

Edna Marcellite Lincoln
- Garner in circa 1930s
- Born: Edna Marcellite Garner; July 3, 1910; Redlands, California, U.S.
- Died: July 26, 1993 (aged 83); Grass Valley, California, U.S.
- Occupations: Artist, voice actress
- Years active: 1930–1941
- Spouses: Richard Bruce Wall (m. 1934; died 1976) Harry Abraham Lincoln (m. 1976)
- Children: Michael Wall; Camden Wall; Richard Jr. Wall (step-son)
- Parents: Thomas Garner; Edna May Michaels

Edna Marcellite Lincoln (/ˌmɑːrsəˈliːt/ MAR-sə-LEET; July 3, 1910 – July 26, 1993), known professionally as Marcellite Garner, was an American artist and voice actress. She is most remembered as the first regular voice of Minnie Mouse during her time working at Walt Disney Productions and has been partially credited with defining Minnie's personality.

== Early life ==
Garner was born in Redlands, California, in 1910. She attended night classes at John H. Francis Polytechnic High School in Los Angeles where she studied art.

In 1911 or 1912, when Garner was just 1 year old, her father died. the following year her mother married Ivy William Garner, the cousin of Marcellite's father, 7 years later Garner's mother died. She spend the rest of her teenage years living with Ivy Garner and his new wife Daphne Hanssen.

== Work at Disney ==
Garner started working at Walt Disney Productions on February 17, 1930, after interviewing the previous year. She worked in the ink and paint department, first working as a cel painter and later as an inker. The studio at the time was a small organization of about 35 employees.

After Garner had been working about six months, she auditioned for the voice of Minnie Mouse at the studio's sound stage, then located on Melrose Avenue. Because Minnie was to play a Mexican in the upcoming film The Cactus Kid, Burt Gillett had asked the Ink and Paint department, which was entirely women, if anyone could speak Spanish. Only Garner and another woman responded, and when the other woman was unwilling to sing, Garner was cast for the role. She went on to voice Minnie in more than 40 films over a decade. Occasionally, Garner also provided additional voices, such as cat meows (Three Orphan Kittens, Lend a Paw), dog barking, and crowd noises, while continuing her duties as an inker.

During the Disney animators' strike of 1941, Garner shot home movies of the picket lines in color. Some of this footage appears in the 2001 documentary Walt – The Man Behind the Myth. Garner was sympathetic to the studio during the strike, commenting, "I couldn't see that we were not being treated fairly. People weren't so union oriented then I guess." She described the atmosphere at the studio as "one big family" before the studio was unionized.

Her final role as Minnie would be in the 1942 war effort short "Out of the Frying Pan into the Firing Line".

Garner worked at the Disney studio off and on for 12 years, during which she also did work for some other studios, including Walter Lantz Productions.

== After Disney ==
Garner eventually married Richard B. Wall and started a family. In 1941, when her second child was born, she permanently quit her job at Disney to devote more time to her children. The family later moved north to Los Gatos, where she again worked in the cartoon business, producing a newspaper comic strip called El Gato for the Los Gatos Times–Observer.

During this time she also worked on different kinds of painting media and ceramics. Some of her artwork she gave to friends, and others she donated to charities and church bazaars.

== Death ==
She died on July 26, 1993, in Grass Valley, California, three weeks after her 83rd birthday.

== Filmography ==
- The Cactus Kid (1930)
- The Fire Fighters (1930)
- The Shindig (1930)
- The Gorilla Mystery (1930)
- The Picnic (1930)
- Pioneer Days (1930)
- The Birthday Party (1931)
- Traffic Troubles (1931)
- The Delivery Boy (1931)
- Mickey Steps Out (1931)
- Blue Rhythm (1931)
- The Barnyard Broadcast (1931)
- The Beach Party (1931)
- Mickey Cuts Up (1931)
- Mickey's Orphans (1931)
- The Grocer Boy (1932)
- Barnyard Olympics (1932)
- Mickey's Revue (1932)
- Musical Farmer (1932)
- Mickey in Arabia (1932)
- Mickey's Nightmare (1932)
- King Neptune (1932)
- The Whoopee Party (1932)
- The Wayward Canary (1932)
- The Klondike Kid (1932)
- Building a Building (1933)
- Mickey's Pal Pluto (1933)
- Mickey's Mellerdrammer (1933)
- Ye Olden Days (1933)
- The Mail Pilot (1933)
- Mickey's Mechanical Man (1933)
- Mickey's Gala Premier (1933)
- Puppy Love (1933)
- The Steeplechase (1933)
- The Pet Store (1933)
- Giantland (1933)
- Shanghaied (1934)
- Camping Out (1934)
- Mickey's Steam Roller (1934)
- Two-Gun Mickey (1934)
- On Ice (1935)
- Three Orphan Kittens (1935)
- Mickey's Rival (1936)
- Hawaiian Holiday (1937)
- Boat Builders (1938)
- Brave Little Tailor (1938)
- Mickey's Surprise Party (1939)
- Out of the Frying Pan and into the Firing line (1942)
- Get a Horse! (2013) (Posthumously, archival audio)

Preceded by Marjorie Norton Ralston	Voice of Minnie Mouse; 1930–1939, 1942	Succeeded by Thelma Boardman
