= The Cactus Kid (1930 film) =

1930 film by Walt Disney

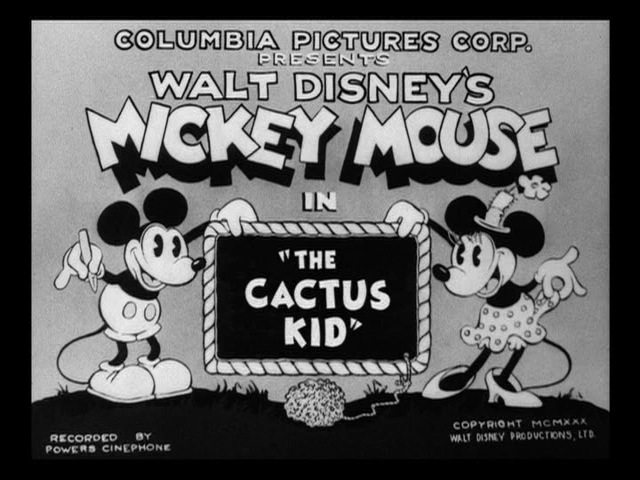
- Title card
- Directed by: Walt Disney
- Produced by: Walt Disney
- Starring: Walt Disney; Marcellite Garner
- Music by: Bert Lewis
- Animation by: Norm Ferguson
- Production company: Walt Disney Productions
- Distributed by: Columbia Pictures
- Release date: May 10, 1930
- Running time: 7:25
- Country: United States
- Language: English

The Cactus Kid is a 1930 American animated comedy short film directed by Walt Disney. It is the eighteenth film of the Mickey Mouse film series, the first short with Marcellite Garner as the voice of Minnie Mouse and the final short to be directed by Disney, who would sideline to being the series' producer after Burt Gillett was promoted to series director.

Due to being published in 1930, the cartoon entered the public domain on January 1, 2026.

The film

== Plot ==
Mickey rides his horse up to a Mexican cantina, where he finds Minnie working as a waitress. He dances and plays the spoons to amuse her, but when he cheekily tweaks her nose, she becomes enraged, upbraiding him in Spanish and then pelting him with lamps and bottles. He earns her favor again by doing a silly dance and playing the piano. Peg-Leg Pete, an ugly ruffian, dances into the cantina and grabs Minnie's arm, taking some beer and asking her for a kiss. Mickey stands up to the bully, and they both draw their guns.

The lights go out, and Mickey and Pete engage in a spirited gunfight. Pete emerges from the cantina with his hands around Minnie; he jumps on his donkey, and rides away. Mickey tries to follow on his horse, but ends up dragged behind the animal, poked with cactus needles. Mickey finally catches up with Pete and jumps onto his moving donkey, then punches him in the face. Pete falls off a cliff and is squashed flat by a boulder. Mickey, Minnie and the horse wave goodbye to a two-dimensional Pete.

== Production ==
This cartoon is the first to feature Marcellite Garner as the voice of Minnie Mouse. She says in Working with Walt: Interviews with Disney Artists:

Bert [sic] Gillett came through the inking department one day and wanted to know if anybody could speak Spanish. I said, "Well, I can't speak it, but I can read it". Marge Ralston said that she could, too, so they took us both over to the sound stage which at the time was on Melrose. When we got there, they said they were sorry, but they had hired a Mexican woman to do it... But they said they wanted Minnie to sing and would either of us like to try out for the singing part. We were both scared to death, but I said sure I would. Marge said she wouldn't and that's all there was to it. Evidently it worked out that my voice fit the character.

Garner continued with the role until 1941, when she left the studio.

The short features a gag where Mickey intends to pull out a pistol, but instead pulls out an umbrella. This is recycled from the April 23, 1930 Mickey Mouse comic strip.

== Voice actors ==
- Mickey Mouse: Walt Disney
- Minnie Mouse: Marcellite Garner
- Peg-legged Pedro: Unknown actor
- Donkey: Unknown actor
- Horace Horsecollar: Unknown actor

== Reception ==
According to Ryan Kilpatrick of The Disney Film Project, "The Cactus Kid is really just a remake of The Gallopin' Gaucho, but it has some distinct differences that make this short very memorable... In Gaucho, Mickey is a swaggering bundle of bravado, who enters the cantina through the window, drinks a beer and smokes a cigarette. He's rough around the edges and grabs Minnie to dance, not asking permission. In Cactus Kid, however, Mickey enters through the door, after riding in on Horace Horsecollar. He meekly enters and joins Minnie in a song, not joining in the revelry with a drink or cigarette like last time. He plays music with her, and when he gets a little fresh, tweaking her nose, Minnie fires back, throwing plates at him. The old Mickey would have been more forceful, but this version of Mickey instead takes a couple of mugs that Minnie threw at him and uses them to do a Mexican dance, using the mugs as castanets. It's quite the change from the mouse who grabs the girl and forces a kiss like he did in Plane Crazy and Gallopin' Gaucho."

Variety (June 18, 1930) said: "For any house that wants to add novelty, comedy and a sure-fire audience-pleaser here's a pip rolled into six minutes. They don't get into the Paramount by mistake and Walt Disney and associates have combined pen and sound effects for beaucoup laughs."

The Film Daily (June 22, 1930) said: "Another of the first-grade cartoon comedies turned out by Walt Disney, and it's a pippin of the front rank. Sound effects are blended into the pen-and-ink creations in such a way that the result is sure-fire for laughs, to say nothing of the unique and unusual nature of the performance."

Motion Picture News (August 23, 1930) said: "Mickey is a cowboy in this and rides to a saloon to make love to a rodent senorita. The villain enters and there is considerable fun. It averages well with others of this popular series, and has a sufficient number of laughs to please most audiences."

== Home media ==
The short was released on December 7, 2004 on Walt Disney Treasures: Mickey Mouse in Black and White, Volume Two: 1929-1935.

== Television ==
The short was shown on several Disney Channel compilation shows:

- Mickey's Mouse Tracks (season 1, episode 31)
- Donald's Quack Attack (season 1, episode 22)
- The Mickey Mouse Club (season 1, episode 39)

== See also ==
- Mickey Mouse (film series)
