= The Plowboy =

1929 film by Walt Disney

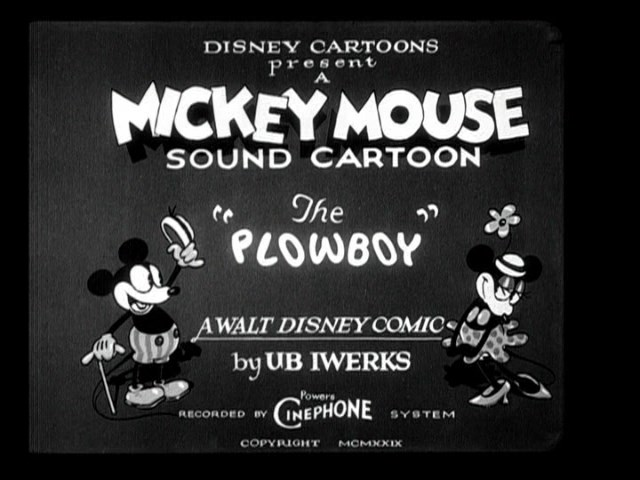
- Directed by: Walt Disney
- Story by: Walt Disney
- Produced by: Walt Disney
- Starring: Walt Disney
- Music by: Carl Stalling
- Animation by: Les Clark; Burt Gillett; Wilfred Jackson; Ben Sharpsteen; Ub Iwerks; Jack King
- Production company: Disney Cartoons
- Distributed by: Celebrity Productions
- Release date: June 28, 1929
- Running time: 7:04
- Country: United States
- Language: English

The Plowboy is a 1929 American animated short film directed and produced by Walt Disney. It is the eighth film of the Mickey Mouse film series. It was the eighth Mickey Mouse short to be produced, the fifth of that year. It was released on June 28, 1929 by Celebrity Productions. Columbia Pictures reissued the film after Walt Disney Productions switched distributors.

== Plot ==
The short

As the title implies, Mickey is depicted as a farmer alongside Minnie Mouse. He is first seen with his horse while plowing a field. Then Minnie comes along with her cow. She has Mickey milk the cow for her. As he does, the cow starts licking him in an apparent sign of affection. Mickey doesn't seem pleased and replies by rolling up its muzzle with its own tongue.

Mickey eventually manages to present Minnie with a full bucket of milk and proceeds to kiss her. Minnie's reply to this sign of affection is to knock his head with the bucket. At some point, the horse is stung by a bee, panics and starts galloping. By the time the horse calms down again, the plow has just broken. In the finale, Mickey resorts to using a pig as a plow.

== Impact ==
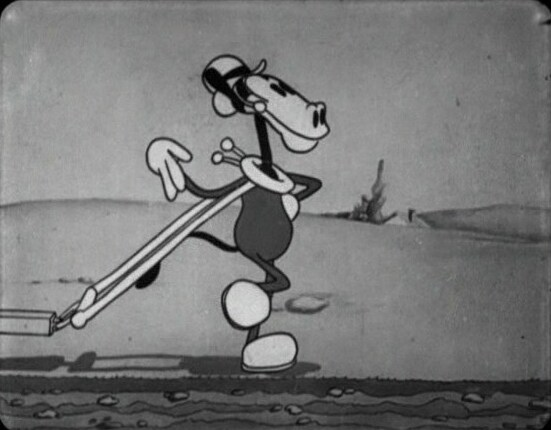
The first appearance of Horace Horsecollar.

The short is notable for the livestock it features. Minnie's cow is considered to be Clarabelle Cow making her second appearance, and Mickey's plow horse is considered to be Horace Horsecollar making his debut. Both characters became fully anthropomorphic in the 1930 short The Shindig, where they were treated as Mickey and Minnie's friends rather than farm animals. By 1933, Disney Studio publicity referred to The Plowboy as Horace's first film.

This short is also the first time Minnie Mouse is seen wearing her gloves.

== Reception ==
The Film Daily (July 28, 1929): "Splendid. The Disney studio is clicking right along on with its Mickey Mouse cartoon series. The animation is not only clever but packs an idea as well. The adventures of Mickey are not particularly important, but they are funny. A fine subject, replete with fun and laughs."

Variety (November 27, 1929): "Clever as to conception and sound effects, but as heard here faulty and well nigh inaudible. That it got laughs despite this is a testimonial. What was wrong can only be guessed. Before and after shorts played on Western Electric discs came through well. Needless to emphasize that if this was a matter of servicing Cinephone should give it prompt attention, even in a daily change grind. After the success of the first of this sound series at the Colony and Strand on Broadway, the distributors got an unusually big break. There is probably no cartoonist who personally or through assistants consistently has gotten so much originality into his stuff as Walter Disney. At this advanced stage of sound, mediocre reproduction calls for investigations, not alibis."

== Home media ==
The short was released on December 7, 2004, on Walt Disney Treasures: Mickey Mouse in Black and White, Volume Two: 1929-1935.

== See also ==
- Mickey Mouse (film series)
