= Mickey's Rival =

1936 Mickey Mouse cartoon

- Theatrical release poster
- Directed by: Wilfred Jackson; Graham Heid (assistant director)
- Produced by: Walt Disney
- Starring: Walt Disney; Marcellite Garner; Sonny Dawson
- Animation by: Les Clark; Clyde Geronimi; Dick Huemer; Frenchy de Tremaudan; Leonard Sebring; Johnny Cannon; Paul Allen; Bob Wickersham; Cy Young (effects)
- Color process: Technicolor
- Production company: Walt Disney Productions
- Distributed by: United Artists
- Release date: June 20, 1936
- Running time: 8 minutes
- Language: English

Mickey's Rival is a 1936 Mickey Mouse short film. It was directed by Wilfred Jackson and produced by Walt Disney. It introduces the character of Mortimer Mouse. It was the 84th Mickey Mouse short film to be released, the fifth of that year.

== Plot ==
Mickey Mouse and his girlfriend, Minnie, are planning a picnic together, when a mouse named Mortimer drives by in his sleek sports car, recognizing his old flame. He backs up and crashes into Mickey's car, pushing it into a tree, and greets Minnie, who’s delighted to see him.

Mortimer immediately starts to make fun of his short rival by playing pranks on him; he shakes hands with Mickey, only to reveal a fake arm sleeve, then deliberately takes two of his buttons off from his shorts, much to Mickey's chagrin and annoyance. Mickey grumpily tries to return the favor, but Mortimer’s buttons are connected to batteries and deliver an electric shock, leaving Mortimer laughing at Mickey's expense. Meanwhile, Mickey's car pushes Mortimer's sports car off and tries to scare it away by rattling its engine, but the sports car loudly honks its horn, scaring the jalopy behind a rock.

Afterward, Minnie, Mortimer and Mickey have the picnic together, during which Mortimer sees a bull in a nearby pen and tries to impress Minnie by doing some bullfighting. He grabs the red picnic blanket to use to fight the bull, luring it into the fences around its pen. Minnie applauds Mortimer but Mickey breaks a teacup out of jealousy, before calling Mortimer a "perfect scream" and storming off to his car, at which point Mickey and his car kick a stone out of anger over being antagonized by Mortimer.

Mortimer continues to taunt the bull before seeing the pen's gate is open. He immediately yelps and runs away with the bull in hot pursuit, before cowardly dropping the blanket over Minnie and fleeing in his sports car, leaving Minnie to deal with the bull herself. After Mickey and his jalopy hear Minnie’s fearful shriek and see her up a tree, both decide to fight the bull off for her.

Mickey manages to stop the bull, but gets himself stuck under it, freeing himself by biting the bull’s tail. While trying to get Minnie down from the tree, the bull charges at them again. Mickey manages to flee its path as it rams into the tree, causing Minnie to fall before climbing back to safety. Mickey then uses the red blanket to fight the bull, only to get himself wrapped up in it, thus limiting his mobility. He grabs a tree branch with his mouth out of desperation, but is forced to retreat again by crawling like a caterpillar as the bull turns around.

At this point, Mickey’s car sees its owner in danger and saves him by pushing it aside, just before being pursued by the bull itself. When the bull turns its attention back to Mickey, the car bites its tail and taunts it using its red taillight, then uses its back wheels to splash mud over the now-tired bull. Meanwhile, as Mickey tries to get a still-frightening Minnie down from the tree, the branch snaps, causing both to plummet to the ground. Luckily, the car catches them with the bull still in pursuit, then confuses it with a ring of dust before driving the couple away. On their way home, a disgruntled Mickey asks Minnie if Mortimer is still funny, to which she replies “no” before shaking Mickey’s hand gratefully.

== Voice cast ==
- Mickey Mouse: Walt Disney
- Minnie Mouse: Marcellite Garner
- Mortimer Mouse: Sonny Dawson
- Leone Le Doux (uncredited)

== Home media ==
=== VHS ===
- Mickey's Greatest Hits (November 18, 1996).

=== DVD ===
- Walt Disney Treasures: Mickey Mouse in Living Color (December 4, 2001).
- Disney's Mickey & Minnies Sweetheart Stories (2004).

=== Blu-ray ===
- Celebrating Mickey (October 23, 2018).

=== Streaming ===
- Disney+.

== See also ==
- Mickey Mouse (film series)
