= The Birthday Party (1931 film) =

1931 film by Burt Gillett

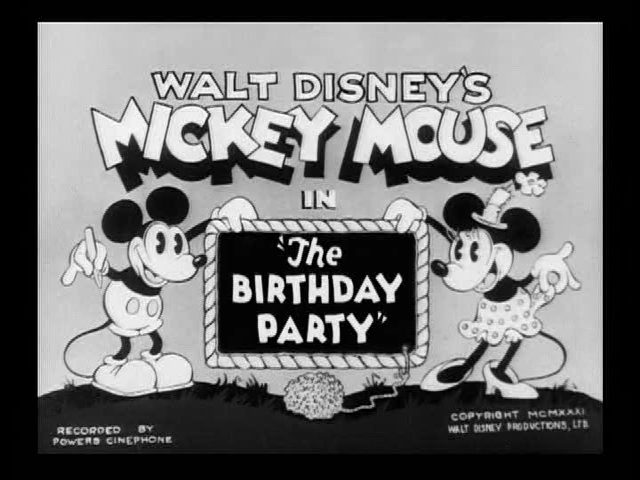
- Title card
- Directed by: Burt Gillett
- Produced by: Walt Disney
- Starring: Walt Disney; Marcellite Garner
- Music by: Bert Lewis
- Production company: Walt Disney Productions
- Distributed by: Columbia Pictures
- Release date: January 2, 1931
- Running time: 7 min
- Country: United States
- Language: English

The Birthday Party is a 1931 American animated short film directed by Burt Gillett. It was released on January 2, 1931. It is the 25th film of the Mickey Mouse film series.

== Plot ==
Minnie Mouse throws a surprise birthday party for Mickey, and he is surrounded by a circle of friends singing and dancing his praises. A pig chef offers him a birthday cake, but Mickey blows so hard that all of the cake ends up on the pig's face.

Mickey opens his present—a small piano, to match Minnie's -- and the two mice play and sing "I Can't Give You Anything but Love, Baby". Then they play "Darktown Strutters' Ball" as the guests dance. After a while, the piano stools take over, and Mickey and Minnie dance as well. Horace Horsecollar and Clarabelle Cow also have a spirited dance break.

Heading to the xylophone, Mickey plays "Home! Sweet Home!" and then accompanies Minnie on "Twelfth Street Rag". The xylophone gets excited and Mickey ends up riding it like a bucking bronco, ending up with a fishbowl over his head.

== Voice cast ==
- Mickey Mouse: Walt Disney
- Minnie Mouse: Marcellite Garner

== Production ==
Mickey Mouse was a little over two years old at this point, having debuted in Steamboat Willie in November 1928. Mickey's "official" birthday changed often -- Walt Disney declared in 1933 that Mickey's birthday was October 1, and in the Mickey Mouse comic strip, Mickey celebrated his 7th birthday on September 28, 1935. Mickey's next birthday cartoon, Mickey's Birthday Party, was released on February 7, 1942. It was not until the early 1970s that Dave Smith of the Walt Disney Animation Studios Archives determined that the date of Steamboat Willie's premiere was November 18, and fixed that as Mickey's official birthday.

== Reception ==
In Mickey's Movies: The Theatrical Films of Mickey Mouse, Gijs Grob writes: "The short's most remarkable feature is a short scene in the beginning, animated by Tom Palmer: Mickey and Minnie bashfully asking each other whether they're fine may constitute the first funny dialogue in Disney history. At least, it's a wonderful example of character animation, elegantly establishing the relationship between the two."

The Film Daily (February 1, 1931): "A Mickey Mouse cartoon in which the animals stage a birthday party, featuring an enormous cake. They go through some clever antics and all in all it is a peppy animated, well up to the standard of the Walt Disney series. The harmony and musical effects override the theme and clutter up the cartoon work unnecessarily in spots, but that seems to be the prevailing idea in cartoons until the exhibs or the public register a definite objection."

== Home media ==
The short was released on December 2, 2002 on Walt Disney Treasures: Mickey Mouse in Black and White.

== Television ==
The short appears in the TV shows The Mickey Mouse Club (season 2, episode 22) and Donald's Quack Attack (season 1, episode 40).

== See also ==
- Mickey Mouse (film series)
