= The Mail Pilot =

1933 film by David Hand

- Directed by: David Hand
- Produced by: Walt Disney
- Starring: Walt Disney
- Color process: Black and white
- Production company: Walt Disney Productions
- Distributed by: United Artists
- Release date: May 13, 1933
- Running time: 7 min
- Country: United States
- Language: English

The Mail Pilot is a 1933 American animated short film directed by David Hand. It is the 56th film of the Mickey Mouse film series.

== Plot ==
Mickey Mouse the mail pilot delivers a chest of money to Minnie Mouse. He battles rain and snow, but his biggest battle is against Pete, who has a plane equipped with a machine gun and a harpoon cannon. Mickey's plane quickly loses its wings and propeller to Pete's armaments, but he improvises a helicopter blade with a clothes-drying rack, then a replacement prop from a windmill. At this point, Pete harpoons him, and Mickey drags Pete through a bell tower, demolishing Pete's plane. Mickey delivers the money to Minnie and brings Pete to the authorities.

== Home media ==
The short was released on December 2, 2002, on Walt Disney Treasures: Mickey Mouse in Black and White.

== See also ==
- Mickey Mouse (film series)
