= Mickey's Mechanical Man =

1933 film by Wilfred Jackson

- Directed by: Wilfred Jackson
- Produced by: Walt Disney
- Starring: Walt Disney
- Music by: Leigh Harline
- Production company: Walt Disney Productions
- Distributed by: United Artists
- Release date: June 17, 1933
- Running time: 6 min
- Country: United States
- Language: English

Mickey's Mechanical Man is a 1933 American animated short film directed by Wilfred Jackson. It is the 57th film of the Mickey Mouse series.

== Plot ==
Mickey Mouse finds out about a new boxing match involving "Kongo the Killer". Mickey constructs a mechanical man, and teaches it how to box while playing piano. Minnie Mouse then comes and honks her car horn, causing the mechanical man to run into a frenzy. The match then begins, and the mechanical man is losing, once felt dazed by Kongo. Kongo is hitting his neck, causing his head to aim toward the ceiling. This continues, until Minnie uses her horn like she did earlier, causing the metal man to become angry and knocks Kongo to the ground. The mechanical man is seen beating up Kongo, and Mickey and the other fans happily clap, and Mickey and Minnie kiss successfully as the cartoon ends.

== Voice cast ==
- Mickey Mouse: Walt Disney
- Minnie Mouse: Marcellite Garner
- Mechanical Man: Billy Bletcher
- Kongo Killer the Gorilla: Nixon Bortamè

== Home media ==
The short was released on December 7, 2004, on Walt Disney Treasures: Mickey Mouse in Black and White, Volume Two: 1929-1935.

== Video game ==
The cartoon is featured in the 2010 game Epic Mickey as a 2-part projector screen level, which connects parts of "Tomorrow City", which is based on Disneyland's Tomorrowland. Also a minigame based on the short appears in the 2019 video game Kingdom Hearts III, where the player controls the robot's movements to defeat the gorilla.
