= The Fox Hunt (1938 film) =

1938 Donald and Goofy cartoon

- Theatrical release poster
- Directed by: Ben Sharpsteen
- Story by: Otto Englander
- Produced by: Walt Disney
- Starring: Clarence Nash; Pinto Colvig; Florence Gill; Walt Disney
- Music by: Paul J. Smith
- Animation by: Clyde Geronimi
- Color process: Technicolor
- Production company: Walt Disney Productions
- Distributed by: RKO Radio Pictures
- Release date: July 29, 1938 (US)
- Running time: 8 minutes
- Country: United States
- Language: English

The Fox Hunt is a 1938 animated short film produced by Walt Disney Productions and released by RKO Radio Pictures. The film stars Donald Duck and Goofy on a traditional English fox hunt. Mickey and Minnie Mouse, Horace Horsecollar, and Clara Cluck also make brief cameos. The film was directed by Ben Sharpsteen and features the voices of Clarence Nash as Donald and Pinto Colvig as Goofy.

== Plot ==
Donald Duck sings "A-Hunting We Will Go" as he takes off on a fox hunt, carrying nothing but a hunting horn and the leashes of several bloodhounds. Donald struggles to control the bloodhounds as they search for the scent of a fox. Meanwhile, Goofy rides a horse as part of the main hunting party. When his horse refuses to jump over a hedge, Goofy demonstrates himself how to make the jump, but discovers a pond directly on the other side.

Eventually, Donald finds the fox and chases him into a burrow. Donald uses blasts from his hunting horn to blow the fox out of the hole. Finally, Donald believes he has cornered the fox in a hollow log. He calls all the other hunters who excitedly arrive at the scene. But when Donald pulls the animal out, he discovers it's nothing but a skunk. The hunters run away in terror. As the skunk prepares to spray, Donald runs away as well as the cartoon ends.

== Voice cast ==
- Mickey Mouse: Walt Disney
- Goofy: Pinto Colvig
- Donald Duck: Clarence Nash
- Clara Cluck: Florence Gill

== Releases ==
- 1938 - theatrical release
- 1956/7 - The Mickey Mouse Club (TV)
- Donald's Quack Attack
- Mickey's Mouse Tracks

== Home media ==
The short was released on May 18, 2004, on Walt Disney Treasures: The Chronological Donald, Volume One: 1934-1941.
