= Gulliver Mickey =

1934 Mickey Mouse cartoon

- Theatrical release poster
- Directed by: Burt Gillett
- Produced by: Walt Disney
- Starring: Walt Disney; Marcellite Garner; Pinto Colvig; Billy Sheets
- Music by: Frank Churchill
- Animation by: Art Babbitt; Johnny Cannon; Les Clark; Ugo D'Orsi; Norman Ferguson; Jack Hannah; Dick Lundy; Hamilton Luske; Bill Roberts; Ben Sharpsteen; Cy Young
- Color process: Black & white
- Production company: Walt Disney Productions
- Distributed by: United Artists
- Release date: May 19, 1934
- Country: United States
- Language: English

Gulliver Mickey is a black and white short cartoon in the Mickey Mouse series, produced by Walt Disney and released by United Artists in 1934. It was the 66th Mickey Mouse short film to be released, and the fourth of that year.

== Plot ==
Mickey is first seen reading Gulliver's Travels, the 1726 novel by Jonathan Swift, while the mice orphan children are pretending to be sailors. He then joins in their play by hiding under the rug, pretending to be a whale. After poking Mickey with a fork, causing their "ship" to collapse, the children start to cry. Mickey manages to calm them down by retelling the Liliput sequences of Gulliver's Travels, pretending it was a real event that happened to him by portraying the role of Gulliver. The story ends with Mickey saving the town from a giant spider (Pete), but after telling the story, one of the children dangles a fake spider attached to a fishing rod, which scares Mickey out of his wits.

As soon as Mickey had manages to struggle to be free from the spider's long legs, he immediately gets the spider away, but in Mickey's story, he is battling a cushion making feathers fly everywhere.

== Legacy ==
Gulliver Mickey is adapted in Kingdom Hearts II as a mission in the Timeless River world, where Sora, Donald Duck and Goofy protect the town from the Heartless.

== Voice cast ==
- Mickey Mouse: Walt Disney
- Pluto: Pinto Colvig
- Mickey's Nephews: Marcellite Garner
- Giant Spider: Billy Sheets

== Home media ==
The short was released on December 2, 2002, on Walt Disney Treasures: Mickey Mouse in Black and White.

== See also ==
- Mickey Mouse (film series)
