= The Reluctant Dragon (1941 film) =

1941 Disney film by Alfred L. Werker and Hamilton Luske

- Original theatrical poster
- Directed by: Alfred Werker (live action); Hamilton Luske (animation); Jack Cutting, Ub Iwerks, Jack Kinney (sequence directors)
- Written by: Live-action: Ted Sears; Al Perkins; Larry Clemmons; Bill Cottrell; Harry Clork; Robert Benchley; The Reluctant Dragon segment: Kenneth Grahame (original book); Erdman Penner; T. Hee; Baby Weems segment: Joe Grant; Dick Huemer; John Miller
- Produced by: Walt Disney
- Starring: Robert Benchley; Frances Gifford; Buddy Pepper; Nana Bryant
- Cinematography: Bert Glennon
- Edited by: Paul Weatherwax
- Music by: Frank Churchill; Larry Morey
- Production company: Walt Disney Productions
- Distributed by: RKO Radio Pictures
- Release date: June 27, 1941
- Running time: 73 minutes
- Country: United States
- Language: English
- Budget: $600,000
- Box office: $960,000 (worldwide rentals)

The Reluctant Dragon is a 1941 American comedy film produced by Walt Disney, directed by Alfred Werker, and released by RKO Radio Pictures on June 27, 1941. Essentially a tour of the then-new Walt Disney Studios facility in Burbank, California, the live-action/animated film stars Algonquin Round Table member, film actor, writer and comedian Robert Benchley and many Disney staffers such as Ward Kimball, Fred Moore, Norman Ferguson, Clarence Nash, and Walt Disney, all as themselves.

The first twenty minutes of the film is in black-and-white, and the remainder is in Technicolor. Most of the film is live-action, with four short animated segments inserted into the running time: a black-and-white segment featuring Casey Junior from Dumbo; and three Technicolor cartoons: Baby Weems (presented as a storyboard), Goofy's How to Ride a Horse, and the extended-length short The Reluctant Dragon, based upon Kenneth Grahame's short story of the same name. The total length of all animated parts is 40 minutes.

== Overview ==
=== Opening ===
The film starts at Robert Benchley's home as he plays in his swimming pool, shooting darts at toy ducks. He is procrastinating, not wanting to drive to Burbank to sell the rights to The Reluctant Dragon to studio head Walt Disney. Benchley's wife convinces him to approach Disney so they drive to the Walt Disney Studios. There, she leaves him at the studio gate while she goes shopping.

=== Studio operations tour by Benchley ===
After his arrival, Benchley dodges an overly officious studio guide named Humphrey (played by Buddy Pepper). As he wanders around the studio, Benchley stumbles upon a number of the Disney operations and learns about the traditional animation process, some of the facets of which are explained by a staff employee named Doris (Frances Gifford).

- The life drawing classroom, where animators learn to caricature people and animals by observing the real thing.
- A film score and voice recording session featuring Clarence Nash, the voice of Donald Duck, and Florence Gill, the voice of Clara Cluck.
- A foley session for a cartoon featuring Casey Junior from Dumbo. Doris demonstrates the sonovox in this scene, which was used to create the train's voice.
- The camera room, featuring a demonstration of the multiplane camera. Upon Benchley's entering the camera room, the film turns from grayscale and black-and-white to Technicolor (a la The Wizard of Oz), prompting the droll Benchley to (breaking the fourth wall) examine his now red-and-blue tie and his yellow copy of the Reluctant Dragon storybook and comment, "Ahh...Technicolor!" When Doris arrives to show him around the camera room, she asks Benchley if he remembers her. His answer: "Yes, but you look so much different in Technicolor!" Donald Duck appears on the camera stand to help explain the mechanics of animation and animation photography.
- The ink-and-paint department, including a Technicolor-showcasing montage of the paint department. Doris presents a completed cel of the titular character from Bambi (which was the character's first appearance).
- The maquette-making department, which makes maquettes (small statues) to help the animators envision a character from all sides. Some of the maquettes on display included Aunt Sarah, Si, and Am from Lady and the Tramp and Peter Pan, Captain Hook, Tinker Bell, Mr. Smee, John and Michael Darling from Peter Pan; both films were in development at this time, but would be delayed by World War II and not completed until the 1950s. Also on display is a black zebra centaurette from Fantasia, which Benchley admires. The employee on duty makes Benchley a maquette of himself, which many years later was purchased and owned by Warner Bros. Cartoons director Chuck Jones.
- The storyboard department, where a group of storymen (one of whom is portrayed by Alan Ladd, with the most screen time) test their idea for a new short on Benchley: Baby Weems. The story is shown to the audience in the form of an animatic, or a story reel, using limited animation. Loaned out by 20th Century Fox to direct this film, Alfred Werker later became the first outside film director to use the storyboard, which the Disney staff had developed from previous illustrated scripts during the early 1930s. One of the actual young studio artists speaking on camera during this segment is John Dehner, who later became a major character actor.
- The room of animators include Ward Kimball, Fred Moore, and Norm Ferguson. Benchley watches Kimball animating Goofy. He and the audience are also treated to a preview of a new Goofy cartoon, How to Ride a Horse, the first of the many how-to parodies in the Goofy series. (RKO later reissued How to Ride a Horse as a stand-alone short on February 24, 1950, featuring John McLeish as the narrator and Clarence Nash as Goofy's horse Percy.) After viewing the Goofy presentation, Benchley witnesses Ferguson animating Pluto.
- Humphrey, who has been one step behind Benchley the entire film, finally apprehends him and delivers him in person to Walt Disney, who is in the studio projection room about to screen a newly completed film. As Benchley sits, he hands Disney the animated cel, the maquette, and discovers the centaurette in a pocket. Disney invites Benchley to join them; to Benchley's slight embarrassment yet relief, the film they screen is a two-reel (twenty-minute) short based upon the very book Benchley wanted Walt to adapt, The Reluctant Dragon.

=== The Reluctant Dragon ===
The cartoon starts with an introduction by the narrator of the story. One of the main characters, The Boy, who is reading a book about knights and bloodthirsty dragons, is introduced. His father comes rushing by, claiming to have seen a monster. The Boy reassures his father that it was only a dragon, which frightens the father, who runs to the village in fear.

The Boy then goes to the Dragon's lair, where he is confronted not by a ferocious beast, but a shy, poetry-loving creature. Though surprised at seeing what a nice creature the Dragon is, the Boy befriends him. When he arrives back at the village, the Boy discovers that Sir Giles the Dragon slayer has arrived. He runs to tell the Dragon that he should fight him, only to be left disappointed when the Dragon announces that he never fights. The Boy visits Sir Giles (not St. George as in the original story), and it is revealed that Sir Giles is an old man. The Boy tells Sir Giles that the Dragon will never fight and they decide to visit him.

Sir Giles and the Boy visit the Dragon while he is having a picnic. It turns out that Sir Giles also loves to make up poetry, so the Dragon and Sir Giles serenade each other. The Boy then asks if he could recite a poem of his own. From this, he uses his chance to get a word in edgewise to shout at them to arrange the fight. The Dragon leaves but is persuaded back out of his cave when he is flattered by Sir Giles. The Dragon and Sir Giles eventually decide to fight, but as Sir Giles and the Boy leave, the Dragon realizes in shock that he has accidentally agreed to a fight and tries to tell Sir Giles and the boy that he changed his mind, but they ignore him and the Dragon mutters to himself why he cannot just keep his big mouth shut. The next day, the villagers gather to watch the fight. Sir Giles arrives waiting for the Dragon.

Inside his cave, the Dragon is too scared to fight and cannot breathe fire. The Boy calling the Dragon a "Punk Poet" leads to the Dragon getting angry and eventually spitting flames. The Dragon jumps for joy as he is now ferocious. The fight ensues, with Sir Giles chasing the Dragon around with his sword and into the cave, where they drink tea and make noises to make it seem they are fighting. Out in the open, they charge at each other, creating an enormous cloud. Inside they dance, and Sir Giles reveals that it is time for the Dragon to be slain, but only for pretend, to which the Dragon gets excited. Sir Giles places his lance under the Dragon's arm, then the Dragon jumps out of the cloud and performs a dramatic death scene. The story ends with the Dragon being accepted into society, to which the Dragon recites a poem:

I promise not to rant or roar, and scourge the countryside anymore!

Sir Giles is drawn by the animators to somewhat resemble Don Quixote.

=== Closing ===
The film closes on Benchley and his wife driving home; she harangues him for failing to sell the movie and that by dilly-dallying, Benchley missed his chance to sell the rights, with Disney having already produced a film. He answers "phooey", in the style of Donald Duck.

== Release and reception ==
The film was released in the middle of the Disney animators' strike of 1941. Strikers picketed the film's premiere with signs that attacked Disney for unfair business practices, low pay, lack of recognition, and favoritism. At one theater, sympathizers paraded down the street wearing a "dragon costume bearing the legend 'The Reluctant Disney'".

Some critics and audiences were put off by the fact that the film was not a full-length animated feature in the vein of Snow White and the Seven Dwarfs or Pinocchio, but essentially a collection of four short cartoons and various live-action vignettes. On the other hand, Photoplay said it was "one of the cleverest ideas to pop into that fertile mind of Walt Disney and results in this rare combination of a Cook's tour of the Disney studio, a behind-the-scenes glimpse of Mickey Mousedom and two of Disney's latest cartoon features... Cleverly thought out and executed."

The Reluctant Dragon cost $600,000 to make and returned $960,000 with $460,000 being generated in the U.S. and Canada.

The film received a 100% rating on Rotten Tomatoes, based on five reviews.

== Analysis ==
Modern critics have pointed out that the dragon's mannerisms can easily be interpreted as gay. Sean Griffin notes "the delight and acceptance of an effeminate male," saying, "The dragon sports long emotive eyelashes and contains not an aggressive bone in his body, with the dragon prancing and pirouetting throughout the story... There is no mistaking how the film makes fun of the dragon's mincing manner and prissy pretentions. Yet, the film also makes it quite clear that the dragon does not believe in fighting, and the film doesn't specifically make fun of him for that... Just as in Ferdinand the Bull, The Reluctant Dragon presents an easily read gay character under the guise of fantasy and shows characters accepting him as he is."

== Home media ==
Disney released the animated "Reluctant Dragon" segment on VHS in 1987, along with the short Morris the Midget Moose and again in 1988 as part of the Walt Disney Mini-Classics series. The full feature was released on VHS in an edition sold only at Disney Stores.

On December 3, 2002, the original full-length feature was released on DVD in its original theatrical form (with the live-action studio tours) as Walt Disney Treasures: Behind the Scenes at the Disney Studio.

In 2007, it was again released in its original theatrical version on DVD, this time as a Disney Movie Club exclusive DVD, available only to club members for mail or online ordering. Shortly afterward, this DVD was also made available in the Disney Movie Rewards program along with some of the other Movie Club exclusives.

The "Reluctant Dragon" segment is the main attraction, along with three other cartoon shorts, on the Disney Animation Collection Volume 6 DVD, which was released in America on May 19, 2009. The other films bundled with it were Ferdinand the Bull, Goliath II and Johnny Appleseed. In the UK, the "Reluctant Dragon" segment was paired with Mickey and the Beanstalk and released during 2004 on DVD as Disney Fables Volume 6.

On August 12, 2014, the full-length feature version of The Reluctant Dragon was released in HD as a bonus feature on The Adventures of Ichabod and Mr. Toad/Fun and Fancy Free Blu-ray set.

== Other appearances ==
A comic book adaptation of the complete film (containing the eponymous short, How to Ride a Horse and Baby Weems respectively) appeared in Four Color #13, published by Dell Comics, along with an adaptation of the Donald Duck cartoon Old MacDonald Duck and a prose text adaptation of The Sorcerer's Apprentice from Fantasia.

The Reluctant Dragon and Sir Giles make various cameos in the 1988 Touchstone Pictures/Amblin Entertainment film Who Framed Roger Rabbit. The Reluctant Dragon also makes brief cameos in House of Mouse, most notably in the start of the intro.

The Reluctant Dragon was mentioned in the 2009 University of Michigan parody musical "A Very Potter Musical" as the dragon that Draco Malfoy had to fight in a house cup tournament.

== See also ==
- 1941 in film
- List of American films of 1941
- List of Walt Disney Pictures films
- List of animated feature films of the 1940s
- List of films with live action and animation
- List of package films
