= Blue Rhythm =

1931 film by Burt Gillett

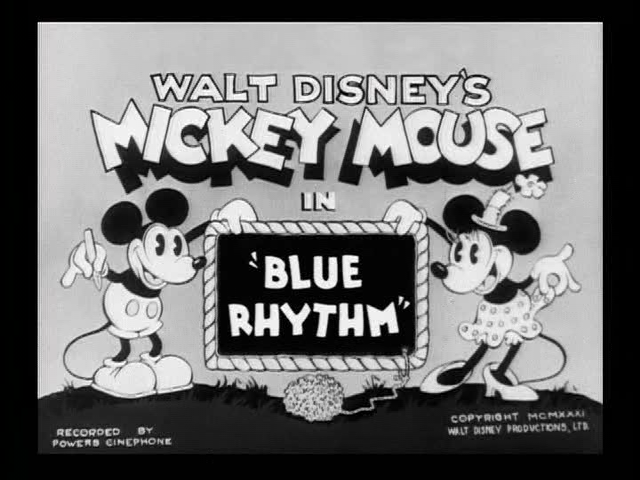
- Title card
- Directed by: Burt Gillett
- Produced by: Walt Disney
- Starring: Walt Disney; Marcellite Garner
- Music by: Frank Churchill
- Color process: Black-and-white
- Production company: Walt Disney Productions
- Distributed by: Columbia Pictures
- Release date: August 7, 1931
- Running time: 7 min
- Country: United States
- Language: English

Blue Rhythm is a 1931 American animated short film directed by Burt Gillett. It is the 31st film of the Mickey Mouse film series. The plot focuses on a multifaceted performance of W. C. Handy's "St. Louis Blues". The film features the voices of Walt Disney as Mickey and Marcellite Garner as Minnie Mouse.

== Plot ==
The concert opens with Mickey on the piano. His shadow is cast dramatically on the curtain as he plays a classical interlude. Soon he transitions into a ragtime version of "St. Louis Blues". Minnie struts onstage and sings the verse "I hate to see that evening sun go down..." with Mickey accompanying. Soon an unseen band takes over the accompaniment and Mickey joins Minnie; the two mice dance and scat sing two more verses.

As Mickey and Minnie exit stage right, the curtain rises to reveal the band – Pluto on trombone, two goats on violins, a Scottish Terrier on sousaphone, a pig on the cornet, Clarabelle Cow on a double bass and a piccolo, two Dachshunds on saxophones, and Horace Horsecollar on a drum set and xylophone; Mickey reappears through a stage elevator to conduct. After several interruptions, Mickey plays a clarinet and parodies jazz bandleader Ted Lewis; the performance is based in part on the Ted Lewis Band's 1926 recording of "St. Louis Blues".

As the band plays the final notes of the climatic finale, they collectively jump on the bandstand and cause it to collapse. They reemerge from the debris to deliver a final "Yeah!" to the audience.

== Voice cast ==
- Mickey Mouse: Walt Disney
- Minnie Mouse: Marcellite Garner

== Reception ==
The Film Daily (October 4, 1931): "Neatly executed and thoroughly entertaining cartoon comedy."

Variety (March 8, 1932): "No story to this, but it needs none to get it over. Opens with Mickey at the piano pounding out a number, with Minnie rather spoiling it with the falsetto singing that is considered necessary for cartoon characters. A short dance and then a break to a stage jazz band for the usual trick stuff, but well done and in excellent synchrony. Cartoon work overlaid on a capital musical program."

== Home media ==
The short was released on December 2, 2002, on Walt Disney Treasures: Mickey Mouse in Black and White.

== Television ==
- 1998 - Ink & Paint Club, episode #44 "Musical Mickey"

== See also ==
- Mickey Mouse (film series)
