= The Klondike Kid =

1932 film by Wilfred Jackson

- Directed by: Wilfred Jackson
- Produced by: Walt Disney
- Starring: Walt Disney
- Color process: Black and white
- Production company: Walt Disney Productions
- Distributed by: United Artists
- Release date: November 12, 1932
- Running time: 7 min
- Country: United States
- Language: English

The Klondike Kid is a 1932 American animated short film directed by Wilfred Jackson. It is the 49th film of the Mickey Mouse film series.

== Plot ==
Mickey works as a pianist at a bar in the Klondike region. One night he finds Minnie out in the cold and saves her by bringing her inside the bar. The two mice appear to meet each other for the first time. Later a wanted outlaw, Terrible Pierre (portrayed by Pete), enters the bar and, after a gun fight, abducts Minnie. Mickey chases after Pierre in a dog sled pulled by Pluto and eventually finds Pierre's hideout.

== Home media ==
The short was released on December 2, 2002, on Walt Disney Treasures: Mickey Mouse in Black and White.

== See also ==
- Mickey Mouse (film series)
