= Out of the Frying Pan into the Firing Line =

- Directed by: Ben Sharpsteen; James Patton "Jack" King
- Produced by: Walt Disney War Production Board Conservation Division
- Starring: Thelma Boardman; Pinto Colvig; Art Gilmore; Jimmy MacDonald; Jeannette Tonner
- Release date: July 30, 1942

Out of the Frying Pan into the Firing Line is a 1942 American animated short film produced by Walt Disney Productions. It was distributed in Technicolor by the War Activities Committee of the Motion Pictures Industry.

== History ==
In 1941, after the sudden attack on Pearl Harbor, The United States Army moved into the Walt Disney Studio and demanded WWII propaganda films, which told the general public about the strength of the US army, the terribleness of the Nazis and how people staying at home could help in the war effort. Some of the most popular shorts released during this time in Disney history were Reason and Emotion and Education for Death, among others.

== Plot ==
Out of the Frying Pan into the Firing Line starred Minnie and Pluto and teaches the house wives of the 1940s the importance of saving fat and grease.
