= Mickey's Nightmare =

1932 film by Burt Gillett

- Directed by: Burt Gillett
- Produced by: Walt Disney
- Starring: Walt Disney; Marcellite Garner; Pinto Colvig
- Color process: Black & white
- Production company: Walt Disney Productions
- Distributed by: United Artists
- Release date: August 13, 1932
- Running time: 7 min
- Country: United States
- Language: English

Mickey's Nightmare is a 1932 American animated short film directed by Burt Gillett. It is the 44th film in the Mickey Mouse series and the first to be distributed by United Artists, eschewing the 1929-1931 titles for a new introduction and a starburst title card involving Mickey, which would be used and updated until the series was discontinued in 1953.

Future Disney storyman Frank Tashlin directed Porky's Romance, a Looney Tunes cartoon starring Porky Pig and Petunia Pig in 1937, which is a parody and homage of Mickey's Nightmare, while he was still at Leon Schlesinger Productions.

== Plot ==
It is nighttime and Mickey Mouse is doing his night prayers before bedtime. As he gets into bed, Pluto joins Mickey, but gets sent to his basket. As soon as Mickey falls asleep, Pluto creeps back into Mickey's bed and licks his face. Mickey dreams about proposing to Minnie, and him getting married.

After the wedding, Mickey and Pluto are in the garden watering the flowers. A stork comes by and drops the first batch of baby mice into the chimney of Mickey and Minnie's home. More baby mice start to arrive by the same stork and a bucketful of them are poured down the chimney. Mickey rushes inside to find Minnie Mouse in bed with many baby mice. They all start to chase and play rough with their father along with their pet dog. Soon, the baby mice start to use paintbrushes to paint the wall and ceiling in black paint. They also throw pillows at Mickey landing on his face, but the last one smacks Mickey so hard, that his jug is now in pieces.

The baby mice then paint the house with ink with one even using the pet cat to paint. Mickey is then in a tight tangle whilst the paint is licking across his face, the telephone is ringing and the cuckoo clock is crowing. In Mickey's bedroom, he finds himself wrapped up in his bedclothes with Pluto licking his face and the rooster is crowing whilst his alarm clock is ringing. Mickey wakes up and realizes it's a dream and his determination now is to never marry Minnie. The cartoon ends with Pluto licking Mickey's face.

== Voice cast ==
- Mickey Mouse: Walt Disney
- Minnie Mouse: Marcellite Garner
- Pluto: Pinto Colvig

== See also ==
- Porky's Romance
- Mickey Mouse (film series)
