= Touchdown Mickey =

1932 film by Wilfred Jackson

- Directed by: Wilfred Jackson
- Produced by: Walt Disney
- Starring: Walt Disney
- Color process: Black and white
- Production company: Walt Disney Productions
- Distributed by: United Artists
- Release date: October 15, 1932
- Running time: 6 min
- Country: United States
- Language: English

Touchdown Mickey is a 1932 American animated short film directed by Wilfred Jackson. It was released on October 15, 1932. It is the 47th film of the Mickey Mouse series.

== Plot ==
Mickey leads his team, Mickey's Manglers, against the Alley Cats in a game of American football. The Alley Cats consist of several large indistinguishable black cats while the Manglers consists of different kinds of animals, including a head butting goat, a long wiener dog, and a large pig capable of steamrolling opponents. Goofy delivers the play-by-play over radio.

== Home media ==
The short was released on December 2, 2002, on Walt Disney Treasures: Mickey Mouse in Black and White.

== See also ==
- Mickey Mouse (film series)
