= The Whoopee Party =

1932 film by Wilfred Jackson

- Directed by: Wilfred Jackson
- Produced by: Walt Disney
- Starring: Walt Disney; Marcellite Garner; Pinto Colvig
- Color process: Black and white
- Production company: Walt Disney Productions
- Distributed by: United Artists
- Release date: September 16, 1932
- Running time: 7 minutes
- Country: United States
- Language: English

The Whoopee Party is a 1932 American animated short film directed by Wilfred Jackson. It was released on September 16, 1932. It is the 46th film of the Mickey Mouse series and the first to feature Goofy's younger redesign, which would remain his definitive appearance to the present day.

== Plot ==
Mickey Mouse and friends have a party in which Minnie Mouse is playing the piano while Mickey, Goofy (then Dippy Dawg), and Horace Horsecollar are preparing some snacks. Characters at the party start off dancing rather sedately to music in the style of 1900, until the food and beverages come out. They eat and drink, then dance more wildly. The music is a hot jazzy version of Scott Joplin's "Maple Leaf Rag", followed by "Some of These Days" and "Runnin' Wild". Inanimate objects around the house start dancing as well. A van full of police drive up to the party with siren blaring and storm the house, but rather than shutting the party down they join in the wild dancing. At the end Mickey and Minnie yell "Whoopee!"

== Voice cast ==
- Mickey Mouse: Walt Disney
- Minnie Mouse: Marcellite Garner
- Goofy: Pinto Colvig
- Horace Horsecollar: Hubert Dobbs

== Reception ==
In The Disney Films, critic Leonard Maltin says: "There is an incredible amount of action on the screen; an opening shot shows a score of couples dancing to the music. Later, when the party starts to jump, every single inch of picture is filled with dancing figures. What is more, nothing is out of bounds for joining the fun: a pair of shirts on the ironing board are as likely to get up and dance as any of the animals at the party".

== Home media ==
The short was released on December 2, 2002, on Walt Disney Treasures: Mickey Mouse in Black and White.

== See also ==
- Mickey Mouse (film series)
