= Mickey's Orphans =

1931 film by Burt Gillett

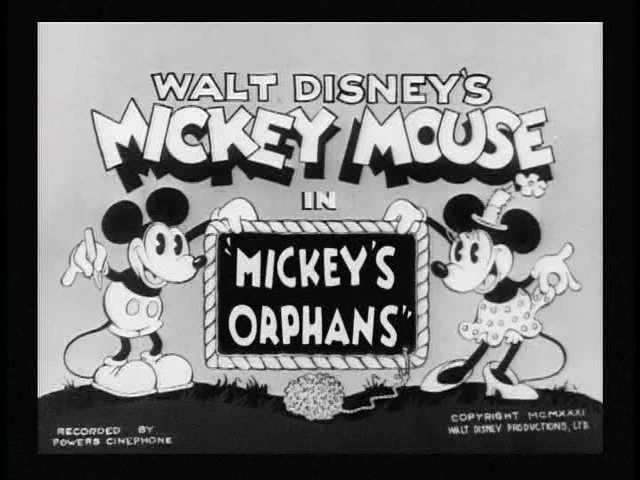
- Title card
- Directed by: Burt Gillett
- Produced by: Walt Disney
- Starring: Walt Disney; Marcellite Garner
- Color process: Black-and-white
- Production company: Walt Disney Productions
- Distributed by: Columbia Pictures
- Release date: December 5, 1931
- Running time: 7 min
- Country: United States
- Language: English

Mickey's Orphans is a 1931 American animated short film directed by Burt Gillett. It is the 36th film of the Mickey Mouse series.

The film was nominated for the Academy Award for Best Animated Short Film at the 5th Academy Awards in 1932, the award's inaugural year. It lost to another Disney film, Flowers and Trees, Disney's first film produced in Technicolor.

== Plot ==
A hooded figure walks past a church on a snowy night carrying a covered basket. The Christmas carol "Silent Night" is heard coming from the church, setting the time of year. The figure then approaches Mickey Mouse's house and peeks in the window: Minnie is playing "Silent Night" on an organ, Mickey is decorating a Christmas tree, and Pluto is peacefully sleeping by the fire. The figure then leaves the basket on Mickey's doorstep, rings the bell, and walks away.

Pluto carries the basket inside and discovers it is loaded with kittens, evidently orphaned. Mickey and Minnie are at first charmed by the kittens, but the kittens soon prove to be a nuisance. Nevertheless, Mickey and Minnie are determined to make the kittens welcome. Mickey leaves the room momentarily and soon returns dressed as Santa Claus with a bag full of toys. The kittens remove the contents, the majority of which are various implements of destruction, such as saws, hammers, and toy weapons. The kittens go to work and destroy the piano and other furniture. Finally, Mickey and Minnie reveal their Christmas tree, but the kittens remove all the decorations and foliage.

== Voice cast ==
- Mickey Mouse: Walt Disney
- Minnie Mouse: Marcellite Garner
- Pluto: Pinto Colvig
- Orphan Kittens: Marcellite Garner

== Reception ==
Motion Picture Herald (December 19, 1931): "Minnie and Mickey find a basket on the doorstep on Christmas Eve. Out jump innumerable miniature Mickies, who proceed to take the furniture apart with neatness and dispatch, to the tune of usual animated furniture music. When Mickey and Minnie expose the Christmas tree, the animated infants strip it with no loss of time. The youngsters will get a real kick out of this short, and the oldsters will extract a bit of enjoyment." This incorrectly refers to the kittens as smaller versions of Mickey.

The Film Daily (December 20, 1931): "Swell Holiday Cartoon: A Walt Disney Mickey Mouse production designed as a Christmas short and one that fills the bill. It will delight all children and get many a laugh from their elders... A Mickey Mouse short that is filled with many hilarious moments for children, and fun for adults who have ever staged a Christmas party for the youngsters."

== Home media ==
The short was released on December 2, 2002, on Walt Disney Treasures: Mickey Mouse in Black and White.

Additional releases include:

- 1983 - "Cartoon Classics: Volume 5: Disney's Best of 1931-1948" (VHS)
- 2005 - "Vintage Mickey" (DVD)

== See also ==
- Mickey Mouse (film series)
- List of Christmas films
