= The Fire Fighters (1930 film) =

1930 film by Burt Gillett

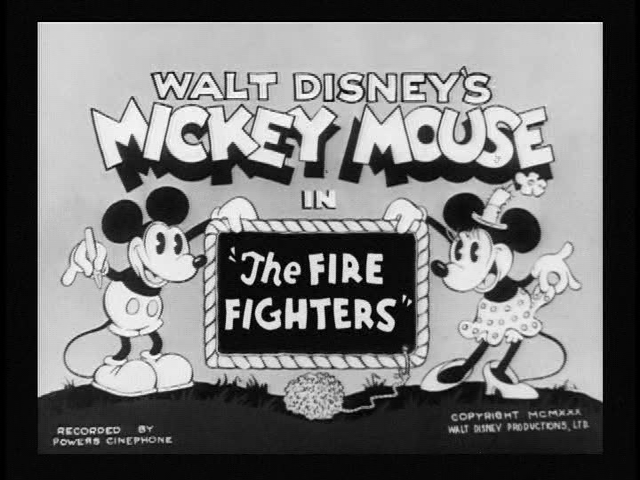
- Title card
- Directed by: Burt Gillett
- Produced by: Walt Disney
- Starring: Walt Disney; Marcellite Garner
- Music by: Bert Lewis
- Production company: Walt Disney Productions
- Distributed by: Columbia Pictures
- Release date: June 20, 1930
- Running time: 7:13
- Country: United States
- Language: English

The Fire Fighters is a 1930 American animated short film directed by Burt Gillett. It was released on June 20, 1930. It is the nineteenth film of the Mickey Mouse film series.

Due to being published in 1930, the cartoon entered the public domain on January 1, 2026.

The film

== Plot ==
Mickey Mouse, Horace Horsecollar and a team of animal firefighters are sleeping in the firehouse when the alarm bell rings. Everyone gets dressed and heads out to a burning apartment building, where Minnie Mouse is trapped on the upper floor. Mickey heroically saves her using the clothesline after she passes out. Minnie starts regaining consciousness by the time they reach the ground and realizes who her savior is. The mice couple sing out each other's name, kissing and embracing each other as the film irises out.

== Production ==
The original outline included a sequence in which Mickey Mouse plays music at the firehouse before the alarm rings; the finished cartoon begins with the fire fighters sleeping.

Mickey would fight fire again in 1935's Mickey's Fire Brigade.

== Voice actors ==
- Mickey Mouse: Walt Disney
- Minnie Mouse: Marcellite Garner

== Reception ==
In Mickey's Movies: The Theatrical Films of Mickey Mouse, Gijs Grob points out: "The Fire Fighters is the first Mickey Mouse cartoon since The Gallopin' Gaucho to tell a straightforward story. The animation may be primitive and rather crude, and some of the movement rather slow, but the cartoon is packed with gags, and leads to an exciting finale that spotlights Mickey's heroic character... The Fire Fighters is one of the best of the early Mickey Mouse cartoons, and certainly Mickey's best short of 1930."

On the Disney Film Project, Ryan Kilpatrick writes: "The Fire Fighters is a great use of the character in his new role as the loveable loser. The bravado filled Mickey of the early shorts would not have worked in this cartoon, but Mickey as the hapless fire chief works really well... Mickey's personality is great in this as well, showing his frustration with the hydrant or the fear of whether he'll be able to save Minnie or not. He really is a character here, not just a collection of drawings, and that's the way he's been evolving throughout this period."

Motion Picture News (November 15, 1930): "Here's another reason why the Mickey Mouse comedies maintain their lead in the comedy field, even though the public is pretty much fed on some of the repetitious stuff in cartoons generally. The laughs come thick and fast. Mickey is a fireman in this and with his trusty company dashes out to save the fair young maiden. He does it to the tune of a lot of laughs."

== Home media ==
The short was released on December 2, 2002 on Walt Disney Treasures: Mickey Mouse in Black and White.

== Television ==
The short was also seen on The Mickey Mouse Club (season 1, episode 86).

== See also ==
- Mickey Mouse (film series)
