= List of Mickey Mouse appearances in Disney media =

The following is a list of films and other media in which Mickey Mouse has appeared, only featuring projects either created or licensed by The Walt Disney Company, the originators and trademark holder of the character, and not any fair use-protected parody content, content made by other studios and artists following the character's entry into the public domain or parody content that has retroactively become Disney property as a result of acquisitions.

== Theatrical shorts and features ==
=== 1920s ===
==== 1928 ====
- Plane Crazy – May 15 (test screening), originally produced as silent cartoon, first to be produced, released with sound.
- The Gallopin' Gaucho – August 2, 1928 (test screening), originally produced as silent cartoon, second to be produced, released with sound on December 30.
- Steamboat Willie – November 18, Mickey Mouse's first released and first cartoon with synchronized sound, including speech, Walt Disney's first role as Mickey (although he speaks gibberish). Third cartoon to be produced. First Mickey Mouse short distributed by Celebrity Productions.

==== 1929 ====
- The Barn Dance – March 14
- The Opry House – March 20
- When the Cat's Away – May 3, loose remake of Alice Comedies cartoon Alice Rattled by Rats.
- The Barnyard Battle – June 1
- The Plow Boy – June 28
- The Karnival Kid – July 31, first cartoon in which Mickey speaks.
- Mickey's Follies – August 28, first cartoon where Mickey sings "Minnie's Yoo-Hoo".
- Mickey's Choo-Choo – September 26
- The Jazz Fool – October 15
- Jungle Rhythm – November 15
- The Haunted House – December 2
- Wild Waves – December 18, last Mickey Mouse short distributed by Celebrity Productions.

=== 1930s ===
==== 1930 ====
- Fiddlin' Around (working title Just Mickey used in many references) – first Mickey Mouse short distributed by Columbia Pictures.
- The Barnyard Concert
- The Cactus Kid
- The Fire Fighters
- The Shindig
- The Chain Gang
- The Gorilla Mystery
- The Picnic
- Pioneer Days
- Minnie's Yoo-Hoo — special cartoon made for the original Mickey Mouse Club. Animation reused from Mickey's Follies.

==== 1931 ====
- The Birthday Party
- Traffic Troubles
- The Castaway
- The Moose Hunt
- The Delivery Boy
- Mickey Steps Out
- Blue Rhythm
- Fishin' Around
- The Barnyard Broadcast
- The Beach Party
- Mickey Cuts Up
- Mickey's Orphans – reuses some story elements from Oswald the Lucky Rabbit cartoon Empty Socks.

==== 1932 ====
- The Duck Hunt
- The Grocery Boy
- The Mad Dog
- Barnyard Olympics
- Mickey's Revue
- Musical Farmer
- Mickey in Arabia – last Mickey short distributed by Columbia Pictures.
- Mickey's Nightmare – first Mickey short distributed by United Artists.
- Trader Mickey
- The Whoopee Party
- Touchdown Mickey
- The Wayward Canary
- The Klondike Kid
- Parade of the Award Nominees – Mickey's first color appearance, not an official Mickey cartoon.
- Mickey's Good Deed

==== 1933 ====
- Building a Building – remake of Oswald the Lucky Rabbit cartoon Sky Scrappers.
- The Mad Doctor
- Mickey's Pal Pluto
- Mickey's Mellerdrammer
- Ye Olden Days
- The Mail Pilot
- Mickey's Mechanical Man
- Mickey's Gala Premier
- Puppy Love
- The Pet Store
- The Steeple Chase – released in 16mm form under the title Mickey's Trick Horse and also released on Super 8 film known as 'Micky In Horse Play'.
- Giantland

==== 1934 ====
- Shanghaied
- Camping Out – known as "Camping Troubles" in releases outside the United States.
- Playful Pluto
- Gulliver Mickey
- Hollywood Party (guest appearance: animated)
- Mickey's Steam Roller
- Orphan's Benefit
- Mickey Plays Papa
- The Dognapper
- Babes in Toyland – guest appearance: live-action as a costumed monkey, his first live-action film appearance. Mickey's appearance in this film was approved by Walt Disney himself.
- Two-Gun Mickey

==== 1935 ====
- Mickey's Man Friday
- The Band Concert – first official color Mickey Mouse cartoon.
- Mickey's Service Station
- Mickey's Kangaroo – last Mickey cartoon in black and white.
- Mickey's Garden
- Mickey's Fire Brigade
- Pluto's Judgement Day
- On Ice

==== 1936 ====
- Mickey's Polo Team
- Orphans' Picnic
- Mickey's Grand Opera
- Thru the Mirror
- Mickey's Rival
- Moving Day
- Alpine Climbers
- Mickey's Circus
- Mickey's Elephant

==== 1937 ====
- The Worm Turns
- Magician Mickey
- Moose Hunters
- Mickey's Amateurs - last Mickey short distributed by United Artists.
- Hawaiian Holiday - first Mickey short distributed by RKO Pictures.
- Clock Cleaners
- Lonesome Ghosts

==== 1938 ====
- Boat Builders
- Mickey's Trailer
- The Whalers
- Mickey's Parrot
- Brave Little Tailor
- The Fox Hunt in Donald & Goofy cartoon (cameo).

==== 1939 ====
- Society Dog Show
- Mickey's Surprise Party – a commercial short made for the National Biscuit Company and shown at the 1939 New York World's Fair.
- The Pointer
- The Standard Parade – a commercial short made for the Standard Oil Company.

=== 1940s ===
==== 1940 ====
- Tugboat Mickey
- Pluto's Dream House
- Mr. Mouse Takes a Trip
- The Sorcerer's Apprentice - segment of Fantasia.

==== 1941 ====
- The Little Whirlwind
- A Gentleman's Gentleman
- Canine Caddy
- The Nifty Nineties
- Orphans' Benefit – remake of the 1934 version, with updated character models, and in color.
- Lend a Paw (Note: in a Pluto cartoon According to films poster)

==== 1942 ====
- Mickey's Birthday Party
- Symphony Hour
- All Together — made for the National Film Board of Canada to promote the sale of Canadian War Bonds.
- Out of the Frying Pan Into the Firing Line (cameo)

==== 1943 ====
- Pluto and the Armadillo (Note: in a Pluto cartoon According to films poster)

==== 1946 ====
- Squatter's Rights

==== 1947 ====
- Mickey and the Beanstalk — segment of Fun and Fancy Free, Jimmy MacDonald's first role as Mickey (filling in for parts not voiced by Walt Disney).
- Mickey's Delayed Date – Walt Disney's last role as Mickey.

==== 1948 ====
- Mickey Down Under
- Pluto's Purchase – in a Pluto cartoon.
- Mickey and the Seal

==== 1949 ====
- Pueblo Pluto – in a Pluto cartoon.
- Winter Storage – in a Donald Duck cartoon. (Cameo)

=== 1950s ===
==== 1950 ====
- Crazy Over Daisy – in a Donald Duck cartoon. (Cameo)

==== 1951 ====
- Plutopia – in a Pluto cartoon.
- R'coon Dawg
- Plight of the Bumble Bee - (cancelled)

==== 1952 ====
- Pluto's Party
- How to Be a Detective (cameo)
- Pluto's Christmas Tree

==== 1953 ====
- The Simple Things – last Mickey Mouse cartoon produced by Walt Disney and last Mickey Mouse short distributed by RKO.

=== 1980s ===
- Mickey Mouse Disco (1980) – a short film based on the album of the same name, a music video clip show of classic Disney cartoons comprising five of the nine songs featured.
- Once Upon a Mouse (1981) – a documentary featurette celebrating Walt Disney and Mickey Mouse.
- Mickey's Christmas Carol (1983) - Last Mickey Mouse titles with Buena Vista titles, and last Mickey Mouse short with Walt Disney Productions notice.
- Swabbies (1985) - cancelled featurette
- Who Framed Roger Rabbit (1988, cameo)
- Oliver & Company (1988, cameo) – Mickey is seen on Fagin's watch.
- The Little Mermaid (1989, cameo)
- Tummy Trouble (1989, cameo) – Mickey appears as a mouse skull anatomical wall chart.

=== 1990s ===
- The Rescuers Down Under (1990, cameo) – Mickey is seen on Percival C. McLeach's watch.
- The Prince and the Pauper (1990)
- Trail Mix-Up (1993, cameo) – bee version of Mickey Mouse.
- A Goofy Movie (1995, cameo)
- Runaway Brain (1995) – remake of The Mad Doctor.
- Toy Story (1995, cameo) – Mickey Mouse was seen on the big watch.
- Mickey's Once Upon a Christmas (1999)
- Fantasia 2000 (1999) – reuse of earlier Fantasia appearance, A Scene of The Sorcerer's Apperentice in 1940, plus a new scene of Mickey telling Donald that he's in 30 seconds.

=== 2000s ===
- The Search for Mickey Mouse (2002) – cancelled feature-length film proposed as a celebration of Mickey Mouse's 75th anniversary.
- Mickey, Donald, Goofy: The Three Musketeers (2004) – limited theatrical screening.
- Chicken Little (2005, cameo) – Mickey Mouse has three eyes (instead of two) and was seen on the watch.
- How to Hook Up Your Home Theater (2007, cameo) – Mickey is seen on Goofy's watch.

=== 2010s ===
- Get a Horse! (2013) – first Mickey Mouse cartoon short in 18 years.
- Frozen (2013, cameo) – a small Mickey toy is partially seen on a shelf.
- Saving Mr. Banks (2013) – as symbolic metafictional character.
- Zootopia (2016, cameo) – Mickey plush mascot is seen on a stroller.
- Ralph Breaks the Internet (2018, cameo) – Mickey is seen standing on top of a giant sorcerer's hat.

=== 2020s ===
- Once Upon a Studio (2023)
- Wish (2023, cameo) – Mickey is seen during the end credits as a star shaped form.

== Theme park attractions ==
- Mickey Mouse Revue (1971, Walt Disney World)
- Star Tours (1987, cameo)
- Here Come the Muppets (1990, Walt Disney World)
- Michael & Mickey (1991, Walt Disney World)
- Muppet*Vision 3D (1991, Walt Disney World, cameo)
- Mickey's Audition (1992, Walt Disney World)
- Fantasmic! (1992, Disneyland)
- Fantasmic! (1998, Walt Disney World)
- Mickey's PhilharMagic (2003, Walt Disney World)
- Fantasmic! (2011, Tokyo DisneySEA)
- Celebrate the Magic (2012–2016, cameo, Walt Disney World)
- World of Color – Celebrate! The Wonderful World of Walt Disney (2015–2016, Disney California Adventure) – Mickey hosting with Neil Patrick Harris.
- Ignite the Dream, A Nighttime Spectacular of Magic and Light (2016, Shanghai Disneyland)
- Disney Illuminations (2017, Disneyland Paris)
- Disney Gifts of Christmas (2017, Tokyo Disneyland)
- Celebrate! Tokyo Disneyland (2018, Tokyo Disneyland)
- Mickey & Minnie's Runaway Railway (2020) – Walt Disney World Hollywood Studios attraction.
- The Twilight Zone Tower of Terror (a Mickey doll appears on the TV)

== Television ==
=== 1950s–1970s ===
- Walt Disney anthology television series (1954–2008)
  - Adventures of Mickey Mouse (1955)
  - The Goofy Success Story (1956) (cameo)
  - On Vacation (1956)
  - The Plausible Impossible (1956) (cameo)
  - Pluto's Day (1956)
  - All About Magic (1957) (cameo)
  - Tricks Of Our Trade (1957) (cameo)
  - The Fourth Anniversary Show (1957) (cameo)
  - Four Tales On A Mouse (1958)
  - From All Of Us To All Of You (1958)
  - This Is Your Life, Donald Duck (1960) (cameo)
  - The Mickey Mouse Anniversary Show (1968)
- The Mickey Mouse Club (1955–1959) – Walt Disney's first role as Mickey since 1947.
- The Mouse Factory (1972-1973) – Jimmy MacDonald's last role as Mickey.
- The New Mickey Mouse Club (1977–1979) – Wayne Allwine's first role as Mickey.
- The 50th Annual Academy Awards (1978) — live-action appearance.
- The Mickey Mouse Jubilee Show a.k.a. Mickey's 50 (1978) — stop-motion appearance:
  - Mike Jittlov - The Collector - The three individual segments are titled The Collector, The Rat Race and Mouse Mania.

=== 1980s ===
- Disneyland's 30th Anniversary Celebration (1985) – live-action TV special.
- DTV Valentine (1986) – TV special
- Walt Disney World's 15th Anniversary Celebration (1986) – live-action TV special.
- DTV Doggone Valentine (1987) – TV special
- Down and Out With Donald Duck (1987) (cameo)
- Funny, You Don't Look 200: A Constitutional Vaudeville (1987) – TV special
- DTV Monster Hits (1987) – TV special
- The 60 Annual Academy Awards (1988) (cameo) – TV special
- Totally Minnie (1988, cameo) – TV special
- Mickey's 60th Birthday (1988) – TV special celebrating Mickey's 60th anniversary.
- Here's to You, Mickey Mouse (1988) – TV special

=== 1990s ===
==== TV specials ====
- The Muppets at Walt Disney World (1990, cameo) – live-action TV special.
- The Best of Disney: 50 Years of Magic (1991, cameo) – live-action TV special.
- Disney's Great American Celebration (1991, cameo) – live-action TV special.
- Walt Disney World Happy Easter Parade (1992, cameo) – live-action TV special.
- Disney's All-Star 4th of July Spectacular: Celebrate the Spirit (1992) – live-Action TV special.

==== TV series ====
- Bonkers (1993) – Mickey is featured as an unseen character in the episode "I Oughta Be In Toons" and featured on a clock as a cameo in "The Rubber Room Song".
- Mickey Mouse Works (1999–2000) – a compilation show with new made-for-TV animated shorts featuring Mickey and friends.

=== 2000s ===
- House of Mouse (2001–2003) – a hosted compilation show with new made-for-TV animated shorts featuring Mickey and friends. Occasional vintage cartoons were also included.
- Mickey Mouse Clubhouse (2006–2016) – TV series made for preschoolers done in CGI animation.
- Have a Laugh! (2009–2012) – Mickey Mouse was re-dubbed by Bret Iwan in re-dubbed classic cartoons, he made his footage appearances in Re-Micks. Mickey Mouse makes cameos in two BLAM! shorts, Clock Cleaning and Beach.

=== 2010s ===
==== TV series ====
- Mickey's Mousekersize (2011)
- Mickey's World Record Animals (2011)
- Mickey Mouse (2013–2019)
- Minnie's Bow-Toons (2011)
- Mickey Mouse Mixed-Up Adventures (2017–2021)
- DuckTales (2017) (cameo) - as a watermelon that is Donald's best friend.
- Mickey Go Local (2019)

==== TV specials ====
- Electric Holiday (2012) – this short film, distributed via the web, stars Minnie as the featured character, but Mickey also makes an appearance.
- Mickey's 90th Spectacular (2018) – TV special celebrating Mickey's 90th anniversary.

=== 2020s ===
==== TV series ====
- The Wonderful World of Mickey Mouse (2020–2023)
  - The Wonderful World of Mickey Mouse: Steamboat Silly (2023)
- Mickey Mouse Funhouse (2021–2025)
- Me & Mickey (2022–present)
- Mickey Mouse Clubhouse+ (2025–present) - a reboot of the original series.

==== TV specials ====
- Mickey's Tale of Two Witches (2021) – Halloween special
- Mickey and Minnie Wish Upon a Christmas (2021) – Christmas special
- The Simpsons (2021–2024)
  - Welcome to the Club (2022, cameo)
  - The Simpsons Meet the Bocellis in "Feliz Navidad" (2022, cameo)
  - Rogue Not Quite One (2023, cameo)
  - May the 12th Be with You (2024, cameo)
- Mickey: The Story of a Mouse (2022) – documentary
  - Mickey in a Minute (2022) - one minute animated short included in the documentary.
- Mickey Saves Christmas (2022) – Christmas special
- Mickey and Friends Trick or Treats (2023) - Halloween special
- Mickey and the Very Many Christmases (2024) - Christmas special
- Mickey's Home Alone (2026) - Christmas special

== Home video ==
- Disney Sing-Along Songs: Disneyland Fun (1990)
- A Day at Disneyland (1991–1994)
- Disney Sing-Along Songs: Friend Like Me (1993)
- Disney Sing-Along Songs: Let's Go to Disneyland Paris! (1993)
- Disney Sing-Along Songs: The Twelve Days of Christmas (1993)
- Mickey's Fun Songs: Campout a Walt Disney World (1994)
- Mickey's Fun Songs: Let's Go to the Circus! (1994)
- Mickey's Fun Songs: Beach Party at Walt Disney World (1995)
- Aladdin and the King of Thieves (1996, cameo) – Genie's transformation only.
- The Spirit of Mickey (1998)
- Mickey's Once Upon a Christmas (1999)
- Mickey's Magical Christmas: Snowed in at the House of Mouse (2001) – House of Mouse video release.
- Mickey's House of Villains (2002) – House of Mouse video release.
- The Lion King 1½ (2004, cameo) – Mickey Mouse was hidden, and after that, he became his shadow appearance. He was found in the ending scene.
- Mickey, Donald, Goofy: The Three Musketeers (2004)
- Mickey's Twice Upon a Christmas (2004) – first Mickey Mouse film done in CGI animation.
- Disney Learning Adventures: Mickey's Seeing the World - Mickey's Around the World in 80 Days (2005) – House of Mouse video release.

== See also ==
- Mickey Mouse (film series)
- Works based on a copyright-free Mickey Mouse
- Hidden Mickey
