= Fishin' Around =

1931 film by Burt Gillett

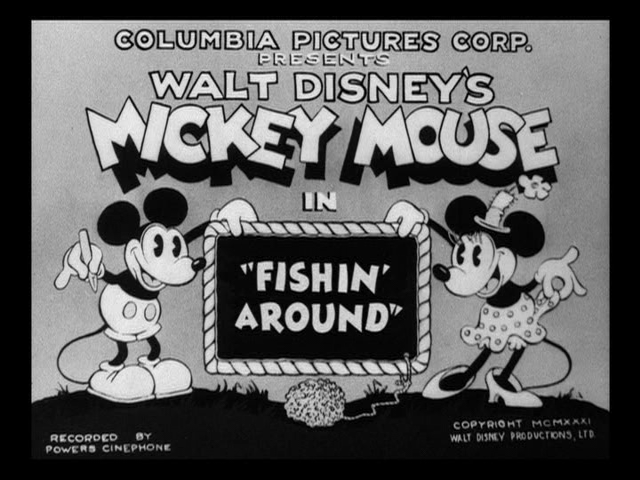
- Title card
- Directed by: Burt Gillett
- Produced by: Walt Disney
- Music by: Frank Churchill
- Color process: Black and white
- Production company: Walt Disney Productions
- Distributed by: Columbia Pictures
- Release date: September 1, 1931
- Running time: 7 min
- Country: United States
- Language: English

Fishin' Around is a 1931 American animated short film directed by Burt Gillett. It is the 32nd film of the Mickey Mouse film series.

== Plot ==
Mickey Mouse takes his dog Pluto on a fishing trip, rowing out onto a lake. Mickey sees a "No Fishing" sign, but he breaks it, places horseshoes on and drops it into the water. Mickey drops his line in the water, and Pluto attaches a fishing line to the end of his tail as well. One fish expertly eats the worm from Mickey's hook, then sticks out his tongue at the fisherman. The fish also tease Pluto, getting him mixed up in a corset and luring him down into the water, where he's tickled by an eel. In another gag, a group of fish dance around Mickey's bait can, feasting on the worms while Mickey's not looking. Under the water, Pluto chases a fish into a cave; an enormous fish chases him out of the cave and across the lake bottom. An old goat gamekeeper, who patrols the lake, tries to arrest Mickey for fishing in a prohibited area, but accidentally steps on the boat without looking, causing him to fall into the water. Mickey uses the opportunity to escape but is forced to use his hands as the paddles fell off after the attempted arrest with the gamekeeper using one of them to catch up. As the goat uses a log get close to Mickey, Pluto quickly swims back to the boat and with Pluto using his tail as an outboard motor, the pair easily get away. Mickey closes the cartoon by sticking out his tongue at the official.

== Voice cast ==
- Mickey Mouse: Walt Disney
- Pluto: Lee Millar

== Production ==
The cartoon recycles some animation from previous Mickey Mouse shorts, including Norm Ferguson's animation of Pluto sniffing along the ground from The Chain Gang.

== Reception ==
In a contemporary review, Motion Picture Herald said that "the fish that are not caught do some delightful tap dancing and a classical music score becomes infectious with merriment."

In Mickey's Movies: The Theatrical Films of Mickey Mouse, Gijs Grob writes: "Like Traffic Troubles, The Moose Hunt, and The Beach Party from the same year, Fishin' Around is a genuine gag cartoon. It is the weakest of the lot, however, and can hardly be called a classic". That said, Grob acknowledges that the short demonstrates how the Disney studio improved the quality of its animation, particularly the reflections of Mickey and Pluto on the water at the beginning of the film.

Animated Short Films: A Critical Index to Theatrical Cartoons called it "a very pleasant cartoon, featuring underwater chases and some clever gags."

== Home media ==
The short was released on December 7, 2004 on Walt Disney Treasures: Mickey Mouse in Black and White, Volume Two: 1929-1935.

== Television ==
Fishin' Around was included in the TV show The Mickey Mouse Club (season 1, episode 29).

== See also ==
- Mickey Mouse (film series)
