= Mickey Mouse (film series) =

Short film series

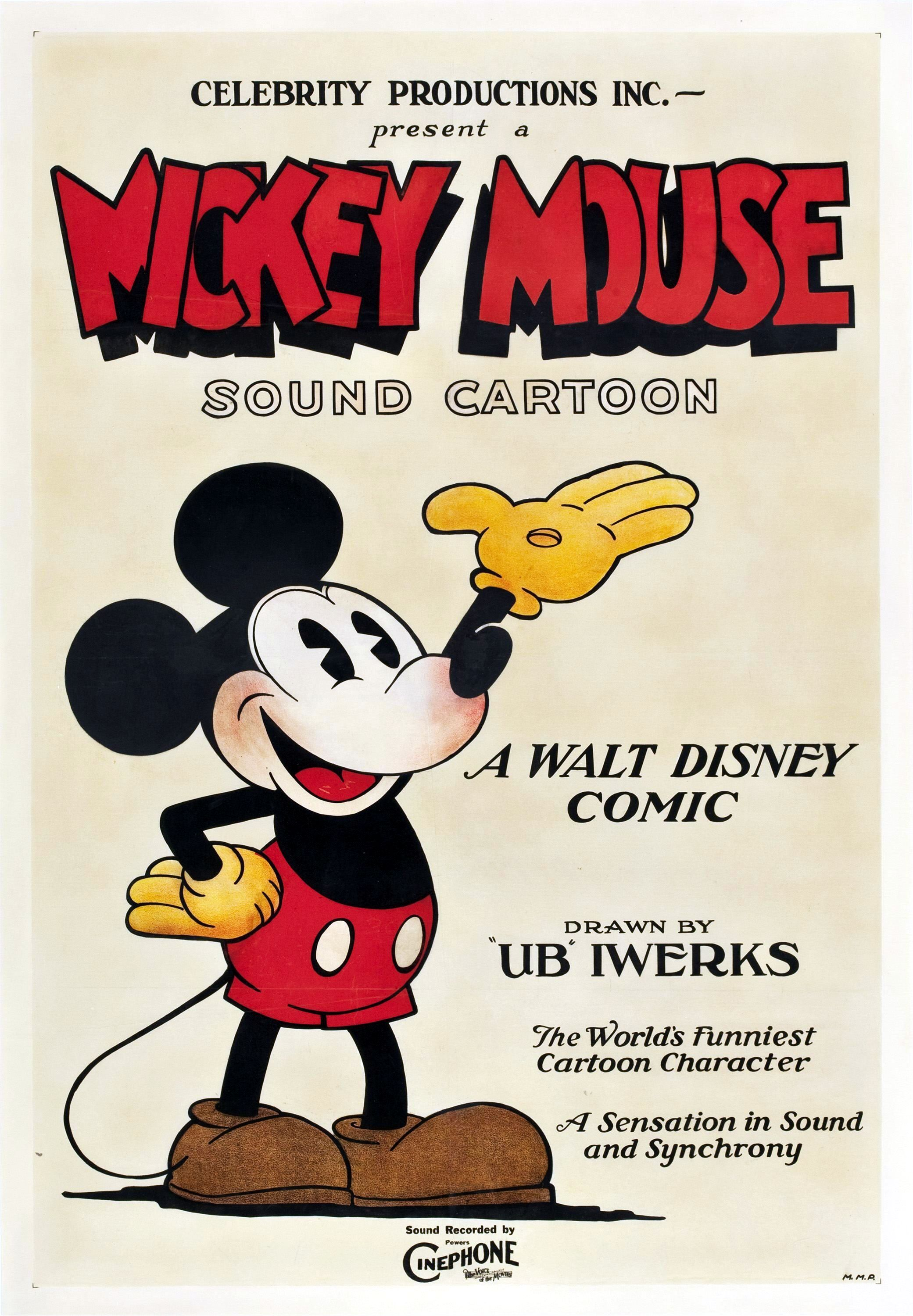
- Promotional poster for the series
- Production company: Walt Disney Animation Studios
- Distributed by: Celebrity Productions (1–15); Columbia Pictures (16–43); United Artists (44–95); RKO Radio Pictures (96–126); Walt Disney Studios Motion Pictures (127–130)
- Country: United States
- Language: English

Mickey Mouse (originally known as Mickey Mouse Cartoons) is a series of American animated comedy short films produced by Walt Disney Productions. The series started in 1928 with Steamboat Willie (Note: While Plane Crazy and The Gallopin' Gaucho were completed before Steamboat Willie, the latter was the first short film in the series to have a formal release.) with 2013's Get a Horse! being the most recent short in the series to date, otherwise taking a hiatus from 1953 to 1983. The series is notable for its innovation with sound synchronization and character animation, and also introduced well-known characters such as the titular protagonist Mickey Mouse, Minnie Mouse, Pluto and Goofy.

The name "Mickey Mouse" was first used in the films' title sequences to refer specifically to the character, but was used from 1935 to 1953 to refer to the series itself, as in "Walt Disney presents a Mickey Mouse". In this sense "Mickey Mouse" was a shortened form of "a Mickey Mouse cartoon" which was used in the earliest films. Films from 1929 to 1935 which were re-released during this time also used this naming convention, but it was not used for the three shorts released between 1983 and 1995 (Mickey's Christmas Carol, The Prince and the Pauper, and Runaway Brain). Mickey's name was also used occasionally to market other films which were formally part of other series. Examples of this include several Silly Symphonies and Goofy and Wilbur (1939).

The shorts released before 1931 are currently in the public domain.

== Production ==
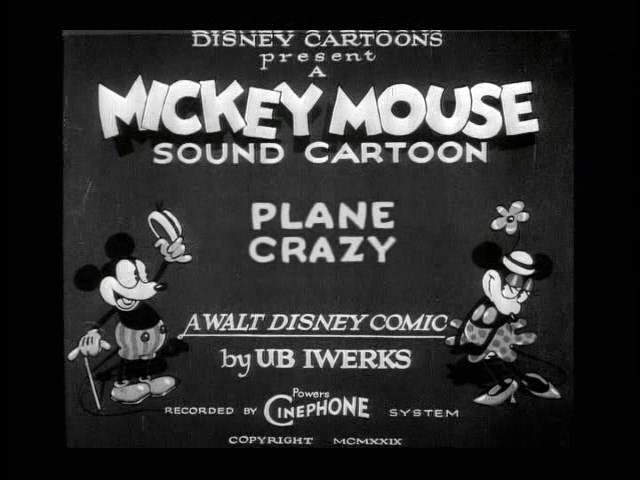
Black-and-white introductory title of the short films between 1928 and 1929, also used for the 2013 short Get a Horse!. Pictured, Plane Crazy.

Disney began secretly producing the first Mickey Mouse films while still contractually required to finish some Oswald the Lucky Rabbit cartoons for producer Charles Mintz. The first two films, Plane Crazy and The Gallopin' Gaucho, were previewed in theaters but failed to pick up a distributor for a broad release. For the third film, Disney added synchronized sound, a technology that was still in its early stages at the time. Steamboat Willie debuted in New York in November 1928 and was an instant success. The revenues from the film provided the studio with much needed resources, and the studio quickly began to produce new cartoons as well as releasing sound versions of the first two.

Production slowed towards the end of the 1930s as the studio began to focus on other characters and feature-length films. The series was informally retired in 1953 with the release of The Simple Things, but was revived in 1983 and 1990 with two featurettes, or three reel short films. 1995's Runaway Brain returned the series to its single reel format, while the latest installment, 2013's Get a Horse!, combines the black-and-white style of the early films with color CGI animation scenes.

The cartoons were directed by 20 different people. Those with the most credits include Burt Gillett (34), Wilfred Jackson (18), Walt Disney (16), David Hand (15), and Ben Sharpsteen (14); the director of the most recent installment, Lauren MacMullan, was the first female director. Notable animators who worked on the series include Ub Iwerks, Norm Ferguson, Ollie Johnston, Frank Thomas, and Fred Moore. Mickey's voice is mostly provided by Walt Disney, with some additional work by Carl Stalling and Clarence Nash. By 1948, Jimmy MacDonald had taken over Mickey's voice. Wayne Allwine voiced the mouse in the three films released from 1983 to 1995. In the most recent film, Get a Horse!, Mickey's dialogue was compiled from archival recordings primarily of Walt Disney's voice work.

== List of films ==
The following is a list of Mickey Mouse films. The early films released by Celebrity Productions (1928–1929) and Columbia Pictures (1930–1932) were distributed by region and state, so there is no definitive release date. The dates used in the list from 1928 to mid-1932 are shipping dates, reflecting when the Disney studio shipped the completed films to the distributors, per the 2018 Disney Enterprises book Mickey Mouse: The Ultimate History. The shorts released by United Artists (1932–1937) and RKO Radio (1937–1940) have official release dates announced by the distributors.

The list does not include shorts where Mickey Mouse appears outside of the Mickey Mouse series, such as appearances in short films starring other characters in their own film series, segments from feature films (such as The Sorcerer's Apprentice), nor shorts of Mickey Mouse made as part of the episodes of the television series Mickey Mouse Works.

Gray headers indicate black-and-white films, while yellow headers indicate color films.

=== 1928 ===
Installment	Film	Director	Release date
1	Steamboat Willie	Walt Disney	November 18, 1928
Mickey works aboard a river steamboat captained by Pete with the mission of transporting livestock. Along the way, Mickey picks up animals and Minnie, and comes up with creative ways to play "Turkey in the Straw" with a goat after it eats Minnie's music sheet. Pete is unamused and puts Mickey to work skinning potatoes. Other appearances: Minnie Mouse, Pete, Clarabelle Cow Notes: Disney's first sound cartoon, selected to the National Film Registry in 1998. The title is a parody of the Buster Keaton film, Steamboat Bill, Jr., which was released May 12, 1928.
2	The Gallopin' Gaucho	Ub Iwerks	December 30, 1928
Mickey is an Argentine gaucho who rides a rhea instead of a horse. He stops at a cantina where he finds Minnie and dances with her. Pete arrives, abducts Minnie, and takes her away on a donkey. Mickey follows after him, but the rhea has become drunk and slows Mickey down. Finally, Mickey confronts Pete in a fencing duel and saves Minnie. Other appearances: Minnie Mouse, Pete Notes: The silent version was screen-tested to a private audience on August 2, 1928, and was later publicly released with sound on December 30, 1928. The cartoon is a parody of the Douglas Fairbanks film, The Gaucho, which was released November 21, 1927. Mickey wears shoes for the first time. At first he and Minnie have the same eyes as in Plane Crazy, but halfway into the cartoon they turn into the dot eyes seen in Steamboat Willie.

=== 1929 ===
Installment	Film	Director(s)	Release date
3	The Barn Dance	Walt Disney	March 14, 1929
Mickey wants to take Minnie to a dance, but Pete's flashy car beats Mickey's horse-drawn wagon as her transportation of choice. At the dance, Mickey uses a balloon to make himself light on his feet — the perfect dancing partner — but this does not keep Minnie at his side for long either. Other appearances: Minnie Mouse, Pete Notes: A colorized version was made in 1991.
4	Plane Crazy	Walt Disney	March 17, 1929
Mickey tries to emulate his hero, Charles Lindbergh, and woo Minnie by building and flying his own airplane. Other appearances: Minnie Mouse, Clarabelle Cow Notes: This is the first to be animated in the series, marking the debut of Mickey and Minnie. The cartoon was screen tested on May 15, 1928; the sound version followed on March 17, 1929.
5	The Opry House	Walt Disney	March 28, 1929
Mickey owns and performs at his own theatre, going in drag as a harem girl, in a derby as a Hasidic Jew, and finally in a wig as a fancy pianist. Other appearances: Minnie Mouse, Kat Nipp Notes: First time Mickey wears gloves outside of title cards and posters.
6	When the Cat's Away	Walt Disney	May 3, 1929
After Tom Cat (not to be confused with the character from Tom and Jerry) has a drink and goes out for the day with his rifle, Mickey, Minnie, and an army of mice break into the feline's home to play music with whatever they can get their little paws on. Other appearances: Minnie Mouse, "Tom Cat" (different sources referring to him as Pete or Kat Nipp) Notes: Remake of Alice Comedies film Alice Rattled by Rats, depicts Mickey and Minnie as regular mice.
7	The Barnyard Battle	Walt Disney	ca. June 1, 1929
Mickey joins an army of mice to battle an army of cats. Commander Pete leads the cats in a raid on Mickey's farm. Mickey mounts a spirited defense of the farmhouse. Other appearances: Pete
8	The Plowboy	Walt Disney	ca. June 28, 1929
Mickey flirts with Minnie on the farm, but she spurns him, making him look bad in the eyes of his helper, Horace Horsecollar. Other appearances: Minnie Mouse, Horace Horsecollar, Clarabelle Cow Notes: First time Minnie wears gloves.
9	The Karnival Kid	Walt Disney & Ub Iwerks	July 31, 1929
Mickey sells animated hot dogs at a carnival and heckles rival barker Kat Nipp. Also at the fair is Minnie who performs as a shimmy dancer. Mickey gives her a free hot dog, and later under the pale moonlight with the help of two alley cats, serenades Minnie outside her trailer with the 1904 hit song Sweet Adeline. Other appearances: Minnie Mouse, Clarabelle Cow, Kat Nipp Notes: First time Mickey speaks actual words, and the first time Mickey has pie eyes and eyebrows.
10	Mickey's Follies	Ub Iwerks & Wilfred Jackson	August 28, 1929
Mickey and his barnyard pals put on a show that includes dancing ducks, opera singing by Patricia Pig, and Mickey's own rendition of his theme song, "Minnie's Yoo Hoo". Other appearances: Minnie Mouse, Clarabelle Cow, Patricia Pig Notes: Introduction of "Minnie's Yoo Hoo", Mickey's theme song.
11	Mickey's Choo-Choo	Walt Disney	September 26, 1929
Mickey is running a small-town railroad. He takes Minnie for a wild ride on a humanized train which eventually rumbles out of control. Other appearances: Minnie Mouse, Clarabelle Cow Notes: A colorized version was made in 1991.
12	The Jazz Fool	Walt Disney	October 15, 1929
As part of "Mickey's Big Road Show", Mickey plays a calliope pulled by Horace. They later play the xylophone and piano, Mickey mercilessly beating up on the latter. Other appearances: Horace Horsecollar
13	Jungle Rhythm	Walt Disney	November 9, 1929
Mickey goes on a hunting expedition to the jungle, but when his rifle malfunctions, Mickey is left facing several angry and vicious animals. To appease them, Mickey starts playing music, and soon has all of the animals joining him.
14	The Haunted House	Jack King (Note: While many sources credit Walt Disney as the director, the animators' draft lists King as director instead.)	December 2, 1929
Mickey weathers a ferocious storm inside an old haunted house where he is compelled to play the organ for a ghost and a group of skeletons. Other appearances: Skeletons, Ghost Notes: Title shortened to Haunted House in rerelease title sequence. The short also has a lost title sequence where the letters that make up the title get blown away by the wind. The last few frames were kept in the reissue.
15	Wild Waves	Burt Gillett	December 18, 1929
Mickey works as a beach lifeguard who saves Minnie from being drowned by a wave. After Minnie is rescued, she fusses, Mickey tries to cheer her up by dancing, playing music and scat sings to "Rocked in the Cradle of the Deep". Also present are a wide variety of sea birds and marine mammals who accompany Mickey. Other appearances: Minnie Mouse Notes: Last film released by Celebrity Productions. Also the last film in the series that was animated by Ub Iwerks.

=== 1930 ===
Installment	Film	Director	Release date
16	Fiddling Around	Walt Disney	March 6, 1930
At a concert hall, Mickey performs solo on a violin. His repertoire includes "Traumerei" and the finale of the William Tell overture. Notes: First film released by Columbia Pictures. Copyrighted as Fiddlin' Around, billed as Fiddling Around. First short made without Ub Iwerks. This short is also known as "Just Mickey".
17	The Barnyard Concert	Walt Disney	April 5, 1930
At the farm, Mickey directs an orchestra rehearsal of Poet and Peasant by Franz von Suppè. The session is filled with distractions and Mickey ends up with a bucket of water thrown on his head. Other appearances: Horace Horsecollar, Clarabelle Cow
18	The Cactus Kid	Walt Disney	May 10, 1930
Set in the desert of Mexico or the southwestern United States; Mickey enters "El Adobe Cafe" where Minnie works as a bar tender. Pete arrives and abducts Minnie after a brief gun fight with Mickey. Mickey rides after Pete on Horace and eventually saves Minnie. Other appearances: Minnie Mouse, Horace Horsecollar (without his yoke), Pete Notes: First time Marcellite Garner voices Minnie, and the first time the animators worked to a prerecorded soundtrack.
19	The Fire Fighters	Burt Gillett	June 20, 1930
Mickey is the fire chief of a fire department which receives an alarm in the middle of the night. The group of fire fighters race to the blaze which engulfs a seven-storey building, but on the way the engine loses its water tank. Mickey saves Minnie, trapped on the top floor, by way of a clothes line connected with another building. Other appearances: Minnie Mouse, Horace Horsecollar Note: Original prints of this film had the fire scenes tinted red.
20	The Shindig	Burt Gillett	July 11, 1930
The friends from the barnyard attend a dance in the barn. Clarabelle Cow attends as Horace Horsecollar's date and the pair take center stage for one of the dances. Mickey and Minnie provide music on fiddle and piano, and Mickey later joins the dancing. Other appearances: Minnie Mouse, Horace Horsecollar, Clarabelle Cow Notes: Clarabelle's name was mentioned for the first time and Clarabelle stands up for the first time.
21	The Chain Gang	Burt Gillett	August 18, 1930
Mickey is a prisoner forced to work on a chain gang with other prisoners. When the guard Peg Leg Pete falls asleep, Mickey leads the prisoners in some care-free, innovative music making, and eventually escape. Mickey vaults himself over the wall, escapes into a swamp and eventually rides away on a pair of horses. When the horses throw Mickey off a cliff, he happens the fall through the roof of the jail and finds himself back in his cell. Other appearances: Clarabelle Cow, Pluto (prototypes), Pete
22	The Gorilla Mystery	Burt Gillett	September 22, 1930
Mickey reads about a gorilla named Beppo has escaped the local city zoo in the newspaper and calls Minnie to warn her. Minnie insists she is not afraid and plays the piano for Mickey over the phone. While Minnie is playing, Beppo enters the house and kidnaps her, ties her up and takes her into the attic. Mickey hears Minnie's screams in the telephone and runs over to her house to save her before Beppo strikes back. Other appearances: Minnie Mouse, Beppo the Gorilla
23	The Picnic	Burt Gillett	October 9, 1930
Mickey and Minnie go on a picnic together along with Minnie's dog Rover. Mickey brings a phonograph, and while he and Minnie dance to "In the Good Old Summer Time", a variety of animals make off with the food. Finally the weather turns bad and the trio head home in a hurry. Other appearances: Minnie Mouse, Pluto as "Rover", Mickey's car
24	Pioneer Days	Burt Gillett	November 20, 1930
Period piece set in the old west. Mickey and Minnie are part of a wagon train of American settlers. Indian scout spots the wagon train and assembles a war party. That night after circling the wagons, the pioneers dance to "The Irish Washerwoman" and later hear on old goat sing an emotional rendition of "Nelly Gray". Just then the Indians attack and a fight breaks out. Mickey and Minnie scare the Indians away by tricking them into thinking U.S. cavalry soldiers are approaching. Other appearances: Minnie Mouse; cameos by Horace Horsecollar, Clarabelle Cow

=== 1931 ===
Installment	Film	Director	Release date
25	The Birthday Party	Burt Gillett	January 2, 1931
Mickey's friends throw a surprise birthday party at Minnie's house. Minnie gives Mickey a piano, and the mice play a piano duet of "I Can't Give You Anything but Love, Baby". During the rest of the party the characters dance and play more songs. Other appearances: Minnie Mouse, Horace Horsecollar, Clarabelle Cow
26	Traffic Troubles	Burt Gillett	March 7, 1931
Mickey works as a taxi driver in a large city. After losing his first customer in the street, Mickey picks up Minnie on her way to a music lesson, but the taxi gets a flat tire which Mickey is unable to repair. Pete appears as a traveling snake oil salesman who feeds a formula to the taxi. This makes the vehicle go out of control. Mickey, Minnie, and the taxi crash through a barn and end up covered in feathers. Other appearances: Minnie Mouse, Pete as "Dr. Pep", Percy Pigg
27	The Castaway	Wilfred Jackson	March 27, 1931
Mickey is a castaway in the ocean and makes it ashore to a jungle island. After eating bananas, a piano washes ashore and Mickey plays it while dealing at first with bothersome wild animals, and later dangerous ones.
28	The Moose Hunt	Burt Gillett	April 30, 1931
Mickey and Pluto go hunting for moose. Mickey accidentally shoots at Pluto with his shotgun and the dog plays dead. After this Mickey and Pluto encounter a real moose and are chased away. Other appearances: Pluto Notes: First appearance of Pluto as Mickey's dog.
29	The Delivery Boy	Burt Gillett	June 6, 1931
While working as a delivery boy driving a cart filled with musical instruments, Mickey passes by Minnie's house. He sneaks up on her while she is outside doing her laundry. The two mice start dancing in the yard, but Mickey punches a bee hive onto the mule pulling the cart. The mule kicks the cart and the instruments land on the animals. Together they all play "Stars and Stripes Forever". Other appearances: Minnie Mouse, Pluto, Pete Notes: This is the last Disney cartoon where the copyright holder is set to "Walter E. Disney".
30	Mickey Steps Out	Burt Gillett	July 10, 1931
Mickey prepares for a date and leaves his house, but Pluto wants to come with him. Mickey tells Pluto to stay home and ties him to the dog house, but Pluto follows anyway, dragging the house behind him. At Minnie's house Mickey and Minnie play music, while outside Pluto chases a cat. The chaos eventually interrupts the date. Other appearances: Minnie Mouse, Pluto
31	Blue Rhythm	Burt Gillett	August 7, 1931
Mickey plays piano at a concert hall and is joined by Minnie singing "St. Louis Blues". Mickey later conducts a blues orchestra that proves too heavy for the stage. Other appearances: Minnie Mouse, Horace Horsecollar, Clarabelle Cow, Pluto
32	Fishin' Around	Burt Gillett	September 1, 1931
Mickey and Pluto go fishing from a boat on a lake after sinking a sign that says "no fishing". The fish turn out to be very intelligent and play several pranks on the fishermen, including tying their fishing lines together. Eventually a police officer appears and, trying to stop Mickey from fishing, accidentally falls in the water. Mickey and Pluto make a speedy getaway. Other appearances: Pluto
33	The Barnyard Broadcast	Burt Gillett	September 30, 1931
Mickey sets up a radio station in the barn and hosts a music program. While Minnie, Horace, and Clarabelle perform, Mickey struggles to keep a cat family out of the barn who are intent on interrupting the broadcast. Other appearances: Minnie Mouse, Horace Horsecollar, Clarabelle Cow, Pluto
34	The Beach Party	Burt Gillett	October 28, 1931
Mickey and his friends spend a relaxing day at the beach going swimming and enjoying a picnic. When Pluto accidentally retrieves an aggressive octopus from the ocean, the party fights him off using techniques learned earlier in the day, such as Horace's spitting of watermelon seeds and ejecting jars of pickled olives from Clarabelle's throat. Other appearances: Minnie Mouse, Horace Horsecollar, Clarabelle Cow, Pluto
35	Mickey Cuts Up	Burt Gillett	November 25, 1931
Mickey mows his yard with a reel mower pulled by Pluto, while next door Minnie waters her garden. Mickey tricks Minnie by pretending to be a bird in a bird house, but instead he gets attacked by a cat. While Mickey and Minnie are playing a harmonica duet, Pluto chases after the cat, but the mower is still tied on to him and it cuts up everything in its path. Other appearances: Minnie Mouse, Pluto
36	Mickey's Orphans	Burt Gillett	December 5, 1931
Mickey and Minnie take in an orphaned litter of kittens during Christmas time. The kittens harass Pluto, ransack the house, and skeletonize the Christmas tree. Other appearances: Minnie Mouse, Pluto, kittens Notes: Nominated for Academy Award for Best Animated Short.

=== 1932 ===
Installment	Film	Director	Release date
37	The Duck Hunt	Burt Gillett	January 21, 1932
Mickey and Pluto go to a pond to hunt for ducks. While Mickey hides behind some bullrushes in a boat with a shotgun, Pluto wears a duck decoy on his head and swims to the center of the pond. The ducks discover the truth after Mickey accidentally shoots a hole in the bottom of his boat. Other appearances: Pluto
38	The Grocery Boy	Wilfred Jackson	February 8, 1932
Mickey and Pluto go grocery shopping for Minnie and later help her cook. Pluto misbehaves and tries to steal the turkey which leads to a disaster. Other appearances: Minnie Mouse, Pluto
39	The Mad Dog	Burt Gillett	February 27, 1932
Mickey gives Pluto a bath, but the dog doesn't like it and jumps out of the tub. Pluto then accidentally swallows the bar of soap and starts hiccuping bubbles. In a panic, Pluto starts running through the city, all the while hiccuping bubbles. People in town panic when they see Pluto foaming at the mouth, and assume he has rabies. Pete, the town dogcatcher corners Pluto in an alley at gunpoint. Mickey pleads with Pete for Pluto's life, but to no avail. Finally Mickey throws a cat down Pete's pants to distract him, while he and Pluto run home. Other appearances: Pluto, Pete; cameo of Clarabelle Cow
40	Barnyard Olympics	Wilfred Jackson	April 13, 1932
Several characters participate in the Olympic Games including boxing and diving. Mickey himself participates in the main event, a cross-country multi-sport race similar to a Triathlon, except it includes row boating instead of swimming. Another participant in the race (possibly Pete) tries to sabotage Mickey's chances of winning along the way. Other appearances: Minnie Mouse, Horace Horsecollar, Clarabelle Cow Note: Released to coincide with the 1932 Summer Olympics in Los Angeles.
41	Mickey's Revue	Wilfred Jackson	May 27, 1932
Mickey presents a revue at an informal concert hall. The program includes an orchestra conducted by Mickey, a stage show with Minnie as a fairy and three dancing cows, two dancing dogs, and a ragtime duet by Mickey and Minnie. There are several distractions throughout the performance including Goofy laughing loudly in the audience and Pluto roaming onto stage. Other appearances: Minnie Mouse, Goofy (as Dippy Dawg, first appearance), Horace Horsecollar, Clarabelle Cow, Pluto
42	Musical Farmer	Wilfred Jackson	June 8, 1932
Mickey plants seeds with Pluto. When Mickey sees Minnie milking a cow, he decides to sneak up on her and scare her with him and Pluto inside a scarecrow. Eventually Mickey is found out and he and Minnie play music with the animals and other improvised instruments. Later Mickey tries to photograph a humongous egg laid by one of the hens. Other appearances: Minnie Mouse, Pluto; hens Fanny, Bessie, Tessie, others Notes: This is one of two shorts distributed by Columbia Pictures to feature the MPPDA in the title card. This is confirmed by the non-theatrical reissue titles
43	Mickey in Arabia	Wilfred Jackson	July 11, 1932
Mickey and Minnie visit the Middle East as tourists. As they are taking pictures with locals, Pete the sultan appears and abducts Minnie behind a fence, carrying her away to his castle on a horse. Mickey follows on his camel but is slowed down because the camel is drunk. Mickey fights Pete and his henchmen and eventually saves Minnie. Other appearances: Minnie Mouse, Pete Note: Last film released by Columbia Pictures.
44	Mickey's Nightmare	Burt Gillett	August 13, 1932
Mickey goes to sleep one night and dreams that he and Minnie get married. Soon several storks arrive at the house dropping off children, literally by the bucket load. The horde of children overrun the house and create a nuisance for Mickey and Pluto. Mickey finally wakes up with a renewed determination never to marry. Other appearances: Minnie Mouse, Pluto, The Orphans Note: First film released by United Artists, introduced new title sequence including the Mickey Mouse starburst.
45	Trader Mickey	David Hand	August 20, 1932
Mickey and Pluto are exploring in Africa taking their trading boat down a jungle river. They come across a tribe of hostile cannibals who take Mickey's things and try and cook the explorers. Later, as the tribe goes through Mickey's goods, they discover several musical instruments. When Mickey teaches them how to play the instruments, they decide not to cook him. Other appearances: Pluto, cannibals
46	The Whoopee Party	Wilfred Jackson	September 17, 1932
Mickey and his friends attend a celebratory community party. Other appearances: Minnie Mouse, Goofy, Horace Horsecollar, Clarabelle Cow
47	Touchdown Mickey	Wilfred Jackson	October 15, 1932
Mickey leads his team, Mickey's Manglers, against the Alley Cats in a game of American football. The Alley Cats consist of several large indistinguishable black cats while the Manglers consists of different kinds of animals, including a head butting goat, a long wiener dog, and a large pig capable of steamrolling opponents. Goofy delivers the play-by-play over radio. Other appearances: Minnie Mouse, Goofy, Horace Horsecollar, Clarabelle Cow, Pluto
48	The Wayward Canary	Burt Gillett	November 12, 1932
Mickey gives Minnie a canary as a present. The canary turns out to have several babies. The birds get loose in Minnie's house and cause problems. Pluto later saves the canary from a cat. Other appearances: Minnie Mouse, Pluto
49	The Klondike Kid	Wilfred Jackson	November 12, 1932
Mickey works as a pianist at a bar in the Klondike region. One night he finds Minnie out in the cold and saves her by bringing her inside the bar. The two mice appear to meet each other for the first time. Later a wanted outlaw, Terrible Pierre (portrayed by Pete), enters the bar and, after a gun fight, abducts Minnie. Mickey chases after Pierre in a dog sled pulled by Pluto and eventually finds Pierre's hideout. Other appearances: Minnie Mouse, Goofy, Pluto, Pete as "Terrible Pierre" Note: Last Mickey Mouse film to be recorded with Cinephone, which was first introduced in Steamboat Willie.
50	Mickey's Good Deed	Burt Gillett	December 17, 1932
On Christmas Eve, Mickey reluctantly sells Pluto in order to give a poor family a happy Christmas. Pluto, however, is mistreated at his new home and is kicked out after creating a nuisance. Mickey and Pluto finally reunite. Other appearances: Pluto, Adelbert, Adelbert's father, butler Note: First Mickey Mouse film to be recorded with RCA's Photophone.

=== 1933 ===
Installment	Film	Director	Release date
51	Building a Building	David Hand	January 7, 1933
Mickey works at the construction site of a steel frame skyscraper while Minnie sells box lunches to the workmen. Pete, the foreman, harasses Minnie and later steals Mickey's lunch. Other appearances: Minnie Mouse, Pluto, Pete Notes: A close, but rather more elaborate remake of Disney's earlier Oswald the Lucky Rabbit cartoon Sky Scrappers (1928). Nominated for Academy Award for Best Animated Short.
52	The Mad Doctor	David Hand	January 21, 1933
A mad scientist named Dr. XXX captures Mickey's dog Pluto and takes him to his laboratory. Mickey follows and tries to save Pluto. Other appearances: Pluto, Dr. XXX, Skeletons Note: Prior to Steamboat Willie, The Gallopin' Gaucho, and a test screening for Plane Crazy, it was the only Mickey Mouse cartoon to be in the public domain prior to 2024 due to a lack of copyright renewal.
53	Mickey's Pal Pluto	Burt Gillett	February 18, 1933
Pluto saves a litter of kittens from drowning, but later becomes jealous when Mickey takes the kittens into the house and are treated like part of the family. As Pluto tries to guard his territory from the kittens, he causes a ruckus and Mickey throws him out of the house. Later the kittens come outside and fall down a well, giving Pluto a moral dilemma of whether or not to save them a second time. Other appearances: Minnie Mouse, Pluto's shoulder angel and devil, kittens Note: Inspired Lend a Paw (1941)
54	Mickey's Mellerdrammer	Wilfred Jackson	March 18, 1933
Mickey and his friends put on a low-budget stage play adaptation of Uncle Tom's Cabin. The use of actual dogs in place of the bloodhounds which chase Eliza across the ice floes leads to chaos as the dogs chase a cat through the orchestra pit. Other appearances: Minnie Mouse, Goofy as "Dippy Dawg", Horace Horsecollar (without his yoke), Clarabelle Cow
55	Ye Olden Days	Burt Gillett	April 8, 1933
Musical set in medieval Europe; a king arranges for his daughter (Minnie) to marry a visiting prince (Dippy Dawg). When Minnie refuses, the king locks her in a tower. Mickey appears as a traveling minstrel and rescues Minnie from the tower, but the king discovers them before they can get away and condemns Mickey to death, anachronistically by guillotine. Just as Mickey is about to be killed, Minnie confesses her love for Mickey, at which point the king orders a duel between Dippy and Mickey. Mickey tricks Dippy and cuts off his spear in the guillotine and chases him out of the castle. Other appearances: Minnie Mouse, Goofy as "Dippy Dawg", Clarabelle Cow, king (possibly Pete)
56	The Mail Pilot	David Hand	May 13, 1933
Mickey works as a courier pilot for the airmail service and helps arrest Pete who is wanted as a mail bandit. Other appearances: Minnie Mouse, Pete Note: At around the same time the short was originally released, the Mickey Mouse comic strip published a storyline [by Floyd Gottfredson] based on the cartoon, which ran from February 27 through June 10.
57	Mickey's Mechanical Man	Wilfred Jackson	June 17, 1933
Mickey builds and trains a boxing robot to face the Kongo Killer, a trained boxing gorilla. Minnie discovers that the sound of a horn makes the robot "go crazy", an effect that Mickey finds undesirable. However, when the robot is being beaten in the match, Minnie uses a horn to motivate the robot to win. Other appearances: Minnie Mouse, Mickey's Mechanical Man, Beppo the Gorilla as "The Kongo Killer" Notes: This is the last Mickey cartoon to start with a rendition of "Minnie's Yoohoo", which was first introduced as the title music in "Jungle Rhythm"
58	Mickey's Gala Premier	Burt Gillett	July 1, 1933
Set at Grauman's Chinese Theater in Hollywood, Mickey and his friends attend the premier of one of his films, the meta-fictional Galloping Romance, which is based on The Cactus Kid. Cartoon versions of movie stars also attend the show and enjoy it immensely. After the film, Mickey receives praise from many of the show's attendees, but when Greta Garbo kisses him, Mickey awakes and discovers it was a dream. Other appearances: Minnie Mouse, Horace Horsecollar, Clarabelle Cow, Pluto, Pete; cameos by over 40 real-life celebrities Note: A 1991 colorized version is known to exist. This short was the last to air on the BBC Television Service in 1939 and was the first after the BBC Television Service relaunched after World War II in 1946.
59	Puppy Love	Wilfred Jackson	September 2, 1933
Mickey and Pluto pay visits to their respective sweethearts, Minnie and Fifi. While Mickey and Minnie are preoccupied playing the piano (playing the song "Puppy Love"), Pluto steals the box of chocolates that Mickey brought for Minnie and gives it to Fifi. He then replaces the chocolate with a bone and returns the box. Both relationships turn cold when Minnie finds the bone, but she later discovers the half-eaten chocolate and reconciles with Mickey. Other appearances: Minnie Mouse, Pluto, Fifi the Peke Notes: The title music to this short was lost for decades until the original titles were uploaded to YouTube in 2019, although incomplete due to splices. The full title music was unearthed in 2026 when a better copy was uploaded onto YouTube. The next two shorts, The Steeplechase and The Pet Store would suffer the same date.
60	The Steeplechase	Burt Gillett	September 30, 1933
Mickey is a jockey in a steeplechase; his horse, Thunderbolt, is sponsored by Colonel Rolfe. After Mickey promises to win the race, the horse discovers a bottle of moonshine in the stable and gets drunk. Instead of the horse, Mickey dresses up two of the stable hands like a horse, and with the help of a pursuing swarm of bees, manage to win the race. Other appearances: Minnie Mouse, Colonel Rolf Rolfe, Thunderbolt
61	The Pet Store	Wilfred Jackson	October 28, 1933
Mickey gets a job at Tony's Pet Store, and while the owner is away Minnie pays a visit to stay with Mickey. A movie ape kept at the store becomes inspired by the 1933 film King Kong, escapes his cage, abducts Minnie, and climbs a tower of boxes. A swarm of birds and other animals fight the ape and create a huge mess at the store. Mickey and Minnie run away just in time before the owner returns. Other appearances: Minnie Mouse, Tony, Beppo the Gorilla
62	Giantland	Burt Gillett	November 25, 1933
Mickey tells the story Jack and the Beanstalk to the mice children and inserts himself into the story as Jack. The film takes over Mickey's narration as he visits "Giantland" and meets the giant. Other appearances: The Orphans, giant Note: Inspired "Mickey and the Beanstalk" from Fun and Fancy Free. This is also the first cartoon to feature an overhaul of the title cards that would last until Mickey's Kangaroo in 1935.

=== 1934 ===
Installment	Film	Director	Release date
63	Shanghaied	Burt Gillett	January 13, 1934
Mickey and Minnie are captured by Pete who is the captain of a ship. Mickey is able to escape from being tied up and fights Pete and his men to take over the ship. Other appearances: Minnie Mouse, Pete Notes: First Disney short to have Billy Bletcher as the voice of Pete.
64	Camping Out	David Hand	February 17, 1934
Mickey, Minnie, Horace, and Clarabelle go camping and fight of a vindictive swarm of mosquitoes. Other appearances: Minnie Mouse, Horace Horsecollar, Clarabelle Cow Notes: Also known as "Camping Troubles" in the United Kingdom.
65	Playful Pluto	Burt Gillett	March 3, 1934
Pluto plays rough with Mickey's garden hose and breaks the spigot. When Mickey goes into the basement to shut the water off, Pluto accidentally swallows a flashlight causing him to panic and eventually rip a hole in the kitchen screen door which lets in flies. Mickey then sets out flypaper which Pluto gets tangled in. Other appearances: Pluto
66	Gulliver Mickey	Burt Gillett	May 19, 1934
Inspired by reading Gulliver's Travels, Mickey tells the mice children about when he was shipwrecked in a land of tiny people. The little people distrust him at first, but later the city is attacked by a giant spider which Mickey fights. Other appearances: Pluto, The Orphans
67	Mickey's Steam-Roller	David Hand	June 16, 1934
Mickey works as a steamroller driver. He comes across Minnie who is babysitting two of his nephews. To give the children a little fun, Mickey tows them around in their baby carriage by the steamroller. After the ride, while Mickey is not watching, the nephews take off in the steamroller by themselves and bring havoc on the city. Other appearances: Minnie Mouse, Morty and Ferdie Notes: Also stylized as Mickey's Steam-Roller.
68	Orphan's Benefit	Burt Gillett	August 11, 1934
Mickey and his friends put on a benefit show for a group of unruly orphans, but Donald loses his temper when the orphans heckle his performance. Other appearances: Donald Duck, Goofy, Horace Horsecollar, Clarabelle Cow, Clara Cluck (debut), The Orphans Notes: First joint appearance of Mickey and Donald Duck.
69	Mickey Plays Papa	Burt Gillett	September 29, 1934
A mysterious hooded figure approaches Mickey's house as he and Pluto are reading a scary book called "The Cry in the Night". The figure turns out to be a destitute mother leaving a baby at Mickey's doorstep. The baby, a mouse named Elmer, turns out to be a fussy child and Mickey and Pluto have to work to keep him happy. Other appearances: Pluto, Elmer Notes: Also known as "Mickey Papa" in France
70	The Dognapper	David Hand	November 17, 1934
Mickey and Donald are police officers who hunt down Peg Leg Pete after he dognaps Minnie's dog Fifi. Other appearances: Donald Duck, Pete, Fifi the Peke; cameo by Minnie Mouse
71	Two-Gun Mickey	Ben Sharpsteen	December 15, 1934
Mickey appears as a cowboy who comes across a self-reliant Minnie in the desert, insisting she can take of herself. In town Minnie again refuses help from Pete, but he turns out to be an outlaw. After Minnie leaves town, Pete and his gang of bandits chase after her, but Mickey realizes Minnie is in trouble and finally comes to help her. Other appearances: Minnie Mouse, Pete Notes: Minnie's first role as a protagonist. Last appearance of Minnie Mouse in black and white.

=== 1935 ===
Installment	Film	Director	Release date
72	Mickey's Man Friday	David Hand	January 19, 1935
Mickey is shipwrecked on an island where he discovers a tribe of cannibals. He scares them away saving the life of one tribesman who was about to be cooked. Mickey names him "Friday", and together Mickey and Friday build a stockade rigged with booby traps. The rest of the tribe eventually reappears and attack the fort. Mickey and Friday abandon the island in a boat. Other appearances: Friday, cannibals Notes: Inspired by Robinson Crusoe.
73	The Band Concert	Wilfred Jackson	February 23, 1935
Mickey conducts a community music band through a public performance of the William Tell overture. Donald Duck distracts the band by coming in uninvited with a flute. The concert is later wrecked by a tornado. Other appearances: Donald Duck, Goofy, Horace Horsecollar, Clarabelle Cow, Peter Pig, Paddy Pig Notes: This is the first color Mickey Mouse cartoon. None of the characters speak in this short except for Donald.
74	Mickey's Service Station	Ben Sharpsteen	March 16, 1935
Mickey, Donald, and Goofy work at an automobile repair shop and try to repair Pete's car with disastrous effects. Other appearances: Donald Duck, Goofy, Pete Notes: First Mickey, Donald, and Goofy adventure. Final appearance of Donald, Goofy and Pete in black and white.
75	Mickey's Kangaroo	David Hand	April 13, 1935
Mickey receives a gift from Australia's famous winemaker Leo Buring: a crate containing a boxing kangaroo and its baby. The baby kangaroo makes Pluto jealous at first, but he later learns to like him. Meanwhile, Mickey boxes the older Kangaroo and gets soundly beaten. Other appearances: Pluto, Hoppy the kangaroo and baby kangaroo Notes: Only time that Pluto is heard thinking. Last Mickey cartoon in black and white until 2013's Get a Horse!, which is partially in black and white. Final black and white appearance of Pluto.
76	Mickey's Garden	Wilfred Jackson	July 13, 1935
Mickey is working in his garden exterminating insects. Other appearances: Pluto Notes: First color appearance of Pluto.
77	Mickey's Fire Brigade	Ben Sharpsteen	August 3, 1935
Mickey, Donald, and Goofy are firefighters responding to a hotel fire. After experiencing many setbacks, the trio finally enter the building and discover a woman upstairs who is unaware that the hotel is on fire. Other appearances: Donald Duck, Goofy, Clarabelle Cow
78	Pluto's Judgement Day	David Hand	August 31, 1935
After Pluto chases a cat inside the house, Mickey scolds him for always chasing cats, and adds that he will have "plenty to answer for on [his] judgement day". Pluto then falls asleep and dreams of judgement day in which he is tried by a hellish court composed entirely of cats. Just as the cats are about to burn Pluto alive, he wakes up and discovers a new appreciation for cats. Other appearances: Pluto
79	On Ice	Ben Sharpsteen	September 28, 1935
Mickey and his friends are leisurely ice skating on a frozen river. Mickey teaches Minnie how to skate, Goofy tries unusual ways to catch fish, and Donald pranks Pluto by attaching skates to the dog's feet while he is sleeping. Other appearances: Minnie Mouse, Donald Duck, Goofy, Pluto; cameo by Horace Horsecollar, Clarabelle Cow Notes: First joint appearance of Mickey, Minnie, Donald, Goofy, and Pluto. First color appearance of Minnie Mouse.

=== 1936 ===
Installment	Film	Director	Release date
80	Mickey's Polo Team	David Hand	January 4, 1936
Mickey leads the Mickey Mousers against the Movie Stars in a spirited game of polo. Mickey's team consists of cartoon characters from Disney films while the Movie Stars are all cartoon versions of real-life movie stars. Several other characters and stars appear as spectators at the game. Other appearances: Donald Duck, Goofy as "The Goof", the Big Bad Wolf; cartoon versions of Stan Laurel, Oliver Hardy, Harpo Marx, Charlie Chaplin, Jack Holt, Shirley Temple; cameos by Clarabelle Cow, Pluto, Fifi the Peke, the Three Little Pigs and other characters from the Silly Symphonies, other movie stars
81	Orphans' Picnic	Ben Sharpsteen	February 15, 1936
Mickey and Donald take the orphans out for a day in the park. Donald sets out a picnic lunch and is unsuccessful in keeping the food from being stolen by the orphans and eaten prematurely. Meanwhile, Mickey plays blind man's bluff with another group of the orphans. Donald is further harassed by the orphans who use teamwork to steal food in creative ways. Other appearances: Donald Duck, The Orphans
82	Mickey's Grand Opera	Wilfred Jackson	March 7, 1936
At a formal concert hall, Mickey conducts the orchestra for an opera starring Clara Cluck and Donald Duck. Before the program, Mickey unexpectedly finds Pluto backstage and sends him home, but the dog becomes distracted by an unattended magician's hat with a rabbit inside. Eventually the opera begins, which features Clara and Donald unintelligibly clucking and quacking back and forth. Pluto, still following the animal spewing hat, wanders onstage during the show and creates chaos. Other appearances: Donald Duck, Clarabelle Cow, Clara Cluck, Pluto; cameo by Goofy
83	Thru the Mirror	David Hand	May 30, 1936
Mickey falls asleep while reading Through the Looking-Glass and has a dream based on the book. In the dream, Mickey passes through his mirror and enters a fantasy world which is essentially a mirror image of his own, except that several inanimate objects become anthropomorphic. Mickey is eventually run out of the dream by an army of hostile playing cards and awakes.
84	Mickey's Rival	Wilfred Jackson	June 20, 1936
Minnie's former boyfriend shows up at Mickey and Minnie's picnic unexpectedly. Mortimer tries to charm Minnie, but acts like a jerk to Mickey. Later Mortimer tries to show off to Minnie by fighting a bull, but when the bull escapes his pen, Mortimer flies away in a flash leaving Mickey to save Minnie. Other appearances: Minnie Mouse, Mortimer Mouse, Mickey's car, Mortimer's car, Bull
85	Moving Day	Ben Sharpsteen	June 20, 1936
Mickey and Donald are behind on their rent. When Sheriff Pete arrives and serves them a notice to dispose their belongings, the pair decide to move in a hurry. They enlist the help of Goofy who, employed as an iceman, has a large truck at his disposal. Other appearances: Donald Duck, Goofy, Pete
86	Alpine Climbers	David Hand	July 25, 1936
Mickey, Donald, and Pluto go mountain climbing in the Alps. Mickey runs into trouble after a mother eagle returns to her nest while Mickey is collecting eggs. Donald's temper flares at a baby mountain goat who eats the Edelweiss flowers he picks. Meanwhile, Pluto falls into a snow bank and freezes solid. He is revived by a St. Bernard rescue dog who gives him brandy, but becomes intoxicated in the process. Other appearances: Donald Duck, Pluto, Bolivar the St. Bernard
87	Mickey's Circus	Ben Sharpsteen	August 1, 1936
Mickey is the ringmaster at a circus and "Captain" Donald Duck performs with trained sea lions. The circus hosts a free day for the orphans, but they cause trouble during the show. Other appearances: Donald Duck, The Orphans, sea lions, Salty the Seal Notes: This shorts featured an animated title card which no longer survives
88	Donald and Pluto	Ben Sharpsteen	September 12, 1936
Donald works as a plumber with Pluto as his assistant. Pluto panics after accidentally swallowing a magnet. Other appearances: Donald Duck, Pluto Notes: First of two films in the series in which Mickey does not appear.
89	Mickey's Elephant	David Hand	October 10, 1936
Mickey builds a nice new house for Bobo the Elephant, his new pet. Pluto becomes jealous of his new playmate, but his scheme for revenge backfires. Other appearances: Pluto, Bobo the Elephant, Pluto's shoulder devil

=== 1937 ===
Installment	Film	Director(s)	Release date
90	The Worm Turns	Ben Sharpsteen	January 2, 1937
As a chemist, Mickey recreates an ancient formula to build courage. He uses it on a fly caught in a spider's web, a mouse, a cat, and finally on Pluto when he is cornered by Pete the dogcatcher. Other appearances: Pluto, Pete
91	Don Donald	Ben Sharpsteen	January 9, 1937
Don Donald rides over to Donna's place on a donkey that drives him nuts. He entertains Donna, until she hops on to the donkey for a little ride and gets thrown off its back into a fountain. Donald then trades in the donkey for a hot new car. Other appearances: Donald Duck, Donna Duck, Jenny the Burro Notes: Second and final film in the series in which Mickey does not appear (reissued as a Donald Duck cartoon).
92	Magician Mickey	David Hand	February 6, 1937
At a formal theater, Mickey performs as a magician, but is heckled by Donald Duck. Mickey then uses his tricks to get back at the ornery duck. Other appearances: Donald Duck, Goofy
93	Moose Hunters	Ben Sharpsteen	February 20, 1937
Mickey, Donald, and Goofy go on an ill-fated hunting trip in the wilderness. Goofy and Donald disguise themselves as a cow moose to attract a bull, while Mickey disguises himself as a tree. Other appearances: Donald Duck, Goofy
94	Mickey's Amateurs	Pinto Colvig, Erdman Penner & Walt Pfeiffer	April 17, 1937
Mickey hosts and moderates a radio talent show. Donald is determined to complete a recitation of "Twinkle, Twinkle, Little Star" even though Mickey terminates his act. Also performing are Clara Cluck who performs an operatic piece and Goofy who plays a multi-instrumental contraption. Other appearances: Donald Duck, Goofy, Clarabelle Cow, Clara Cluck, Pete
96	Hawaiian Holiday	Ben Sharpsteen	September 24, 1937
Mickey and his friends enjoy a vacation in Hawaii. Other appearances: Minnie Mouse, Donald Duck, Goofy, Pluto Notes: First film released by RKO Radio Pictures.
97	Clock Cleaners	Ben Sharpsteen	October 15, 1937
Mickey, Donald, and Goofy are employed as janitors in a tall clock tower. Mickey struggles with a squatting stork, Donald fights a talking mainspring, Goofy gets knocked into a daze by an animatronic bell ringer. Other appearances: Donald Duck, Goofy
98	Lonesome Ghosts	Burt Gillett	December 24, 1937
Mickey, Donald, and Goofy run "Ajax Ghost Exterminators" and receive a call from a group of "lonely ghosts" who want someone to scare. Other appearances: Donald Duck, Goofy, the Lonesome Ghosts Notes: Released four days after Snow White.

=== 1938 ===
Installment	Film	Director	Release date
99	Boat Builders	Ben Sharpsteen	February 25, 1938
Mickey, Donald, and Goofy build a boat from do-it-yourself kit. The boat comes in several crates of prefabricated sections, such as an unfolding keel and a telescoping mast. At the boat's launching, Minnie christens the boat "Queen Minnie", but as she breaks a bottle of champaign on the bow, she damages the boat, which disassembles itself once in the water. Other appearances: Minnie Mouse, Donald Duck, Goofy; cameos by Horace Horsecollar, Clarabelle Cow, Morty and Ferdie
100	Mickey's Trailer	Ben Sharpsteen	May 6, 1938
Mickey, Donald, and Goofy take a near-disastrous road trip in a travel trailer. Other appearances: Donald Duck, Goofy Notes: This is the 100th Mickey Mouse cartoon.
101	The Whalers	Dick Huemer	August 19, 1938
Mickey, Donald, and Goofy go out to sea as a three-man whaling crew. Donald keeps a sharp lookout for whales from the crow's nest and tries to keep his baloney sandwich from being eaten by seagulls. Mickey struggles to throw a pail of water overboard and Goofy mans a harpoon gun. Eventually the trio come across a large sperm whale, but things do not go according to plan. Other appearances: Donald Duck, Goofy
102	Mickey's Parrot	Bill Roberts	September 9, 1938
A stray parrot, apparently formerly owned by a sailor, finds his way into Mickey's basement. Upstairs Mickey and Pluto receive a radio bulletin warning the public of an escaped convict, "Machine Gun Butch". Mickey hears the bird in the basement and believes the killer has broken into the house. Other appearances: Pluto, parrot
103	Brave Little Tailor	Bill Roberts	September 23, 1938
A loose adaptation of the fairy tale The Valiant Little Tailor, set in medieval Europe. Mickey Mouse is commissioned by the King to slay a giant that has been terrorizing the kingdom, promising him the hand of his daughter, Princess Minnie, if he is successful. Other appearances: Minnie Mouse as "Princess Minnie", unnamed king, Gustav the Giant Notes: Nominated for Academy Award for Best Animated Short.

=== 1939 ===
Installment	Film	Director	Release date
104	Society Dog Show	Bill Roberts	February 3, 1939
Mickey enters Pluto in a high society dog show, but gets kicked out. He later re-enters Pluto in the "trick dog" category and puts a pair of roller skates on him. Meanwhile, Pluto falls in love with Fifi, a Pekingese also entered in the show, and saves her when the building burns down. Other appearances: Pluto, Fifi the Peke Notes: Final cartoon to feature Mickey with his dot-eyes.
105	Mickey's Surprise Party	Hamilton Luske	February 18, 1939
Minnie tries to surprise Mickey by cooking him some cookies for his birthday, but her recipe gets burnt, leaving her to cry on the couch. Fortunately, Mickey buys Minnie some Nabisco products to cheer her up. Other appearances: Minnie Mouse, Pluto, Fifi the Peke Notes: Commercial film sponsored by the National Biscuit Company for the 1939 New York World's Fair. First appearance of Mickey's modern character design.
106	The Pointer	Clyde Geronimi	July 21, 1939
During a hunting trip, Mickey tries to train Pluto to be a pointer dog. The pair eventually encounter a large grizzly bear whom Mickey tries to reason with before running from. Other appearances: Pluto Notes: Nominated for Academy Award for Best Animated Short. First short to feature Mickey's current design.

=== 1940 ===
Installment	Film	Director	Release date
107	Tugboat Mickey	Clyde Geronimi	April 26, 1940
Mickey captains a tugboat with Donald, and Goofy as the crew. As Mickey is sealing the mast and dealing with an intoxicated pelican, he receives a distress signal of a sinking ship. Mickey calls the crew and has them fire up the engine. As Donald struggles with the connecting rod of one of the pistons, Goofy accidentally overloads the furnace of the ship's steam engine, causing a catastrophic explosion and accidentally breaks the boat. As Mickey, Donald, and Goofy are floating in the water amid the remains of the tugboat, they discover that the distress signal they heard was only part of a radio drama. Other appearances: Donald Duck, Goofy
108	Pluto's Dream House	Clyde Geronimi	August 30, 1940
Mickey decides to build Pluto a new house, but they discover a magic lamp while breaking ground. The lamp finishes building the house in a hurry, and Mickey then tasks the lamp with giving Pluto a bath. Later, as Mickey is relaxing next to the radio, it starts to have a mechanical problem. Mickey tries to fix it, but the radio keeps changing stations. The lamp, within earshot in the next room, takes the radio's random audio snippets as verbal commands, and starts preparing Pluto like a recipe. Just as the lamp is about to slice Pluto into thin slices, he wakes up and discovers it was a dream. Other appearances: Pluto, Magic Lamp
109	Mr. Mouse Takes a Trip	Clyde Geronimi	November 1, 1940
Mickey and Pluto go for a train ride despite a rule forbidding dogs. Pete plays a menacing conductor intent on enforcing the rule. Mickey at first hides Pluto in his suitcase, but eventually Pete discovers him and chases them about the train. Other appearances: Pluto, Pete

=== 1941 ===
Installment	Film	Director	Release date
110	The Little Whirlwind	Riley Thomson	February 14, 1941
Mickey offers to clean Minnie's yard for a cake she is baking, but he is thwarted by a small, mischievous whirlwind. After chasing the whirlwind away, Mickey is in turn chased by a large whirlwind with damages most of the neighborhood. Seeing the damage, Minnie is jealous with Mickey and throws the cake at him when he lands in a fountain. Other appearances: Minnie Mouse Notes: First of two shorts to feature Mickey with buck teeth, and first short to feature him with dimensional oval ears.
111	A Gentleman's Gentleman	Clyde Geronimi	March 28, 1941
Pluto acts as Mickey's personal valet. The dog serves Mickey breakfast in bed and then is sent by Mickey into town to buy a newspaper. Other appearances: Pluto
112	Canine Caddy	Clyde Geronimi	May 30, 1941
Mickey goes golfing with Pluto serving as his caddie. Pluto at first causes distractions for Mickey, but helps him out by pointing to the ball just like he learned in The Pointer. Later Pluto encounters a mischievous gopher whom he chases burrowing through the ground. Other appearances: Pluto, Gopher Notes: Second and final short to feature Mickey with buck teeth.
113	The Nifty Nineties	Riley Thomson	June 20, 1941
Period piece from the 1890s. Mickey and Minnie spend the day together going to a Vaudeville show and driving across the countryside in a Brass Era car. Other appearances: Minnie Mouse; cartoon versions of animators Fred Moore and Ward Kimball; cameos by Goofy, Donald Duck, Daisy Duck, Huey, Dewey, and Louie
114	Orphans' Benefit	Riley Thomson	August 22, 1941
Mickey and his friends put on a benefit show for a group of unruly orphans, and Donald loses his temper when the orphans heckle his performance. Other appearances: Donald Duck, Goofy, Horace Horsecollar, Clarabelle Cow, Clara Cluck, The Orphans Notes: Color remake of the black-and-white Orphan's Benefit (1934).
115	Lend a Paw	Clyde Geronimi	October 3, 1941
Pluto saves a kitten from drowning. Mickey takes the kitten in and Pluto becomes jealous. When the kitten accidentally falls into a well, Pluto struggles with whether or not to save the kitten a second time. Other appearances: Pluto, kitten, Pluto's shoulder angel and devil Notes: Won Academy Award for Best Animated Short Film, color remake of Mickey's Pal Pluto (1933).

=== 1942 ===
Installment	Film	Director	Release date
116	Mickey's Birthday Party	Riley Thomson	February 7, 1942
Minnie hosts a surprise birthday party for Mickey with several of his friends. The gang buys him an electric organ and they play music and dance. Meanwhile, in the kitchen, Goofy tries to bake the birthday cake with disastrous results. Other appearances: Minnie Mouse, Donald Duck, Goofy, Horace Horsecollar, Clarabelle Cow, Clara Cluck
117	Symphony Hour	Riley Thomson	March 20, 1942
Mickey conducts a symphony orchestra of his friends, sponsored by Pete (as Sylvester Macaroni). After an exceptional rehearsal playing the "Light Cavalry Overture", the orchestra is booked for a live performance, but Goofy accidentally drops the instruments down an elevator shaft. Other appearances: Donald Duck, Goofy, Horace Horsecollar, Clarabelle Cow, Clara Cluck, Pete Notes: Final appearance of Horace Horsecollar, Clarabelle Cow, Clara Cluck, and Pete until Mickey's Christmas Carol in 1983.

=== 1943 ===
Installment	Film	Director	Release date
118	Pluto and the Armadillo	Clyde Geronimi	February 19, 1943
Mickey and Pluto make a 15-minute stop-over in Belém, Brazil on their way to Rio de Janeiro. There, Mickey plays fetch with Pluto, but the ball becomes lost in the jungle and Pluto mistakes a rolled up armadillo for it. Mickey and Pluto accidentally take the armadillo along with them when the plane leaves again. Other appearances: Pluto, armadillo Notes: Last appearance of Mickey's red shorts until Runaway Brain (1995).

=== 1946 ===
Installment	Film	Director	Release date
119	Squatter's Rights	Jack Hannah	June 7, 1946
Chip and Dale take up residence in Mickey's hunting shack during the winter. When Mickey and Pluto return for hunting season, Pluto discovers the chipmunks living in the wood-burning stove. Other appearances: Pluto, Chip and Dale Notes: Nominated for Academy Award for Best Animated Short Film.

=== 1947 ===
Installment	Film	Director	Release date
120	Mickey's Delayed Date	Charles Nichols	October 3, 1947
Mickey oversleeps and misses a date with Minnie. She calls him up and gives him an ultimatum. Mickey gets ready in a hurry with the help of Pluto, but drops the tickets for the event on his way out. Pluto saves the day by noticing the tickets on the floor and bringing them to Mickey. Other appearances: Minnie Mouse, Pluto Notes: Last theatrical short with Walt Disney voicing Mickey.

=== 1948 ===
Installment	Film	Director	Release date
121	Mickey Down Under	Charles Nichols	March 19, 1948
Mickey and Pluto visit Australia where Mickey collects bananas using a boomerang and tries to steal an egg from a vigilant emu. Other appearances: Pluto Notes: First theatrical short with Jimmy MacDonald voicing Mickey.
122	Mickey and the Seal	Charles Nichols	December 3, 1948
Mickey accidentally brings a baby seal home with him from the zoo. The seal takes a liking to Mickey's bathtub, but makes Pluto jealous. Mickey eventually takes the seal back, but he later brings the rest of the seals to Mickey's house. Other appearances: Pluto, Salty the Seal Notes: Nominated for Academy Award for Best Animated Short Film.

=== 1951 ===
Installment	Film	Director	Release date
123	R'coon Dawg	Charles Nichols	August 10, 1951
While hunting with Mickey, Pluto picks up the scent of a raccoon and follows the trail, but the clever raccoon discovers he is being followed and lays several tricks for the dog to throw him off the trail. When at last Pluto trees the raccoon, he secretly swipes Mickey's coonskin cap to make Pluto think that he has a baby. Pluto and Mickey then respectfully leave the raccoon alone. Other appearances: Pluto

=== 1952 ===
Installment	Film	Director	Release date
124	Pluto's Party	Milt Schaffer	September 19, 1952
It's Pluto's birthday party, but the orphans seem to be having all the fun. Their present is a wagon so Pluto can pull them; the "Pin the Tail on Pluto" game doesn't go quite right, and everything seems to prevent Pluto from having his birthday cake, but Mickey has planned ahead. Other appearances: Pluto, The Orphans Notes: This is the only Disney cartoon where Milt Schaffer is the director.
125	Pluto's Christmas Tree	Jack Hannah	November 21, 1952
Pluto comes bounding outside to help Mickey get a Christmas tree. Chip 'n Dale see him and make fun of him, but the tree they take refuge in is the one Mickey chops down. They like the decorations, especially the candy canes and Mickey's bowl of mixed nuts. Pluto spots them and goes after them long before Mickey spots them. Other appearances: Pluto, Chip and Dale; cameos by Minnie Mouse, Donald Duck, Goofy

=== 1953 ===
Installment	Film	Director	Release date
126	The Simple Things	Charles Nichols	March 27, 1953
Mickey and Pluto go fishing and Pluto encounters a mischievous clam who eats the bait. After getting rid of the clam, Mickey is outsmarted by a clever seagull. Mickey and Pluto get chased away by a flock of hungry birds. Other appearances: Pluto, clam, seagull Notes: Mickey's final theatrical appearance until Mickey's Christmas Carol in 1983.

=== 1983 ===
Installment	Film	Director	Release date
127	Mickey's Christmas Carol	Burny Mattinson	December 16, 1983
Adaptation of Charles Dickens' 1843 novella A Christmas Carol with Mickey as Bob Cratchit and Scrooge McDuck as Ebenezer Scrooge. Other appearances: Scrooge McDuck, Minnie Mouse, Donald Duck, Daisy Duck, Goofy, Jiminy Cricket, Willie the Giant, Pete, Morty and Ferdie, Millie or Melody; cameos by Horace Horsecollar, Clarabelle Cow, Clara Cluck, Huey, Dewey, and Louie, Chip and Dale, Grandma Duck, Gus Goose, Percy Pigg, Patricia Pigg, and others. Notes: Nominated for the Academy Award for Best Animated Short Film. First time Wayne Allwine voices Mickey since The New Mickey Mouse Club. Longest film of the series at 26 minutes. First Mickey film since 1953.

=== 1990 ===
Installment	Film	Director	Release date
128	The Prince and the Pauper	George Scribner	November 16, 1990
Adaptation of Mark Twain's 1881 novel of the same name with Mickey playing the pauper and a look-alike fictional Prince Edward. Other appearances: Goofy, Donald Duck, Horace Horsecollar, Clarabelle Cow, Pluto, Pete

=== 1995 ===
Installment	Film	Director	Release date
129	Runaway Brain	Chris Bailey	August 11, 1995
Eager to give Minnie a Hawaiian vacation, Mickey answers a newspaper want ad advertising "a mindless day's work". After reporting for the job, however, Mickey is horrified to discover he is to partake in a mad scientist's brain-swapping experiment with a monster. Other appearances: Minnie Mouse, Pluto, Pete as "Julius", Dr. Frankenollie Notes: Nominated for Academy Award for Best Animated Short Film.

=== 2013 ===
Installment	Film	Director	Release date
130	Get a Horse!	Lauren MacMullan	November 27, 2013
Mickey and friends embark on a musical wagon ride, until Peg-Leg Pete shows up and tries to run them off the road. Other appearances: Minnie Mouse, Horace Horsecollar, Clarabelle Cow, and Pete; cameo by Oswald the Lucky Rabbit Notes: Hand drawn black and white sequences alongside color CGI sequences. Debuted at the Annecy International Animated Film Festival on June 11, 2013. Nominated for the Academy Award for Best Animated Short Film. Oswald the Lucky Rabbit cameos at the end of the short, making his first appearance in a Mickey Mouse-related short and also his first appearance in a theatrical short since his cameo in The Woody Woodpecker Polka (1951).

== Releases ==
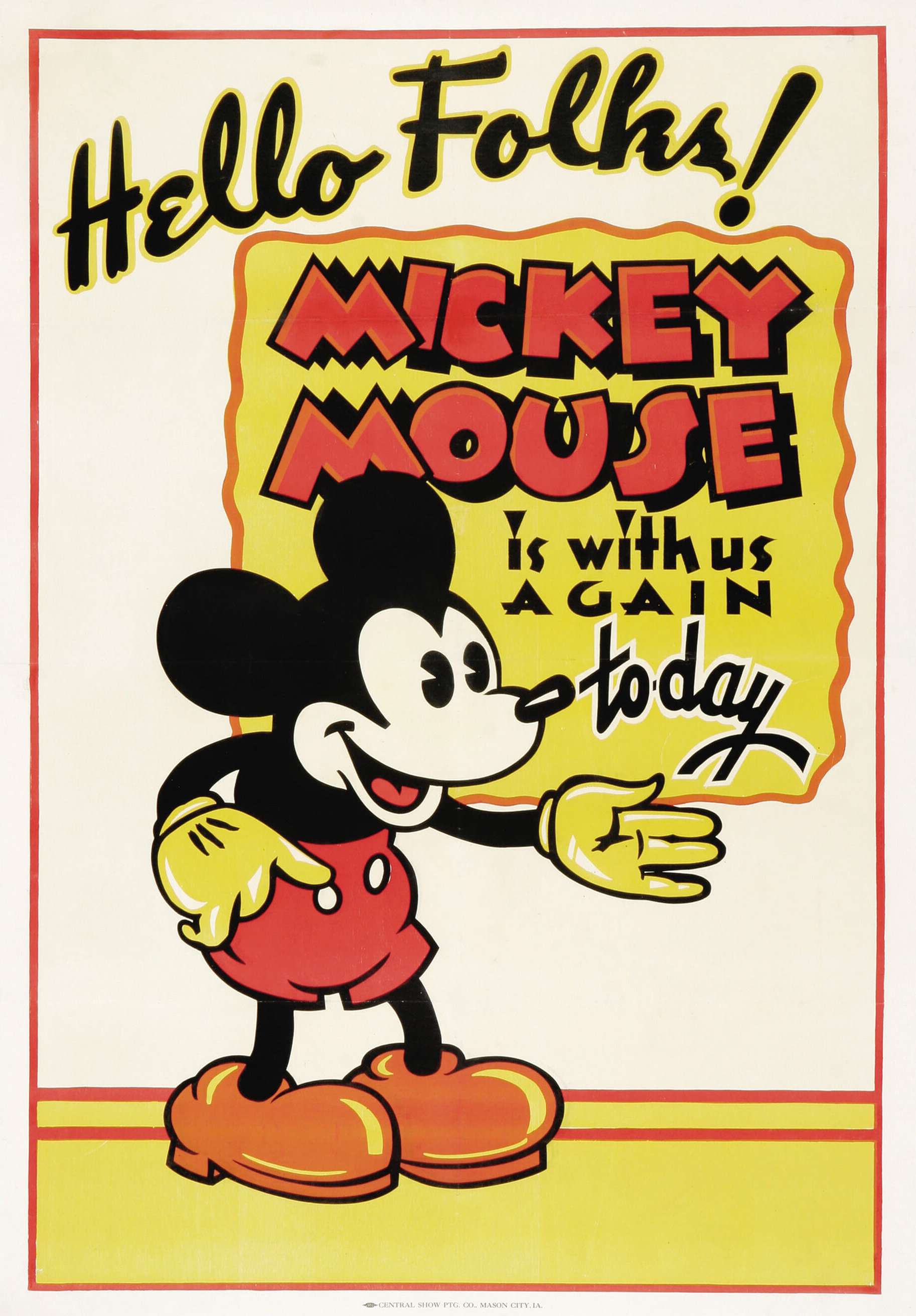
A 1932 poster promoting the cartoons

Every Mickey Mouse cartoon was originally released theatrically, typically appearing before feature films. In 1929, some theaters began to host the "Mickey Mouse Club", a children's program which would exclusively show Mickey's cartoons. The series was distributed by Columbia Pictures (1930–1932), United Artists (1932–1937), and RKO Radio Pictures (1937–1953). The four most recent films were released by Disney's own company, Walt Disney Studios Motion Pictures (formerly known as Buena Vista Pictures Distribution).

Many of the films were also broadcast on television, beginning in 1936 on BBC Television. Here the series was shown on a regular basis except during World War II. In the United States, selected films were shown on the Walt Disney anthology television series, and later on other series such as The Mouse Factory (1971–1973), Mickey's Mouse Tracks (1992–1995), and Ink & Paint Club (1997–1998).

== Home media ==
The films have also been released in various forms of home media. In the 1960s there were several 8 mm and Super 8 releases, although these were often silent, black-and-white, or condensed versions. In 1978, Disney began to release selected films on VHS, laserdisc, and later DVD. Starting in 2010, some of the cartoons were made available on the iTunes Store as digital downloads.

Disney has also released films online. At the Disney website, cartoons are shown on a rotating basis under the video page "Mickey & Friends". On Walt Disney Animation Studios' official YouTube channel, three complete cartoons have been released: Plane Crazy (1928), Steamboat Willie (1928), and Hawaiian Holiday (1937), and most of Thru the Mirror (1936) as seen on the Disneyland episode "The Plausible Impossible" (1956).

As of 2026, the only complete re-release of the entire series has been in the "Walt Disney Treasures" DVD sets. The vast majority of the series appears between four two-disc sets: "Mickey Mouse in Black and White" (2002), "Mickey Mouse in Black and White, Volume Two" (2004), "Mickey Mouse in Living Color" (2001), and "Mickey Mouse in Living Color, Volume Two" (2004). Film critic Leonard Maltin, who hosts the collection, implied that there was opposition to releasing the complete series because of some content now considered politically incorrect, such as racial and ethnic stereotypes. Maltin argued that releasing the material uncensored was the only way to "learn from the past". The only film not included in this collection was the subsequently released Get a Horse! (2013) which first premiered at the Annecy International Animated Film Festival and was shown ahead of Frozen.

== See also ==
- List of Walt Disney Animation Studios short films
  - Alice Comedies
  - Silly Symphony
  - Once Upon a Studio
- List of Mickey Mouse films and appearances
- Parade of the Award Nominees
- Pluto (film series)
- Donald Duck (film series)
- Goofy (film series)
- Mickey Mouse Works
- Mickey Mouse (TV series)
- The Wonderful World of Mickey Mouse

== Bibliography ==
- The Encyclopedia of Disney Animated Shorts Archived June 7, 2017, at the Wayback Machine (EDAS)
- Gabler, Neal (2007). Walt Disney: The Triumph of the American Imagination. New York: Vintage. ISBN 978-0-679-75747-4.
- Gerstein, David (2005). Walt Disney's Mickey and the Gang: Classic Stories in Verse. Timonium, MD: Gemstone Publishing. ISBN 978-1-888472-06-6.
- Holliss, Richard; Brian Sibley (1986). Walt Disney's Mickey Mouse: His Life and Times. New York: Harper & Row. ISBN 0-06-015619-8.
- The Internet Movie Database (IMDb)
- Kaufman, J.B.; Gerstein, David (2018). Walt Disney's Mickey Mouse: The Ultimate History. Cologne: Taschen. ISBN 978-3-8365-5284-4.
- "Oscars.org". Beverly Hills, California: Academy of Motion Picture Arts and Sciences. 2011.
- Smith, Dave (1996). "Disney A to Z". Disney A to Z: The Official Encyclopedia (1st ed.). New York: Hyperion. ISBN 0-7868-8149-6.
- Tomart's Illustrated Disneyana Catalog and Price Guide
