= The Mad Dog =

1932 film by Burt Gillett

- Title card
- Directed by: Burt Gillett
- Produced by: Walt Disney
- Starring: Walt Disney
- Color process: Black and white
- Production company: Walt Disney Productions
- Distributed by: Columbia Pictures
- Release date: February 27, 1932
- Running time: 7 min
- Country: United States
- Language: English

The Mad Dog is a 1932 American animated short film directed by Burt Gillett. It is the 39th film of the Mickey Mouse series.

== Plot ==
Mickey gives Pluto a bath, but the dog doesn't like it and jumps out of the tub. Pluto then accidentally swallows the bar of soap and starts hiccuping bubbles. In a panic, Pluto starts running through the city, all the while hiccuping bubbles. People in town panic when they see Pluto foaming at the mouth, and assume he has rabies. Pete, the town dogcatcher corners Pluto in an alley at gunpoint. Mickey pleads with Pete for Pluto's life, but to no avail. Finally Mickey throws a cat down Pete's pants to distract him, while he and Pluto run home.

== Reception ==
In a contemporary review, Motion Picture Herald said: "Excellent animated cartoon."

== Home media ==
The short was released on December 7, 2004, on Walt Disney Treasures: Mickey Mouse in Black and White, Volume Two.

== See also ==
- Mickey Mouse (film series)
