= The Barnyard Concert =

1930 film by Walt Disney

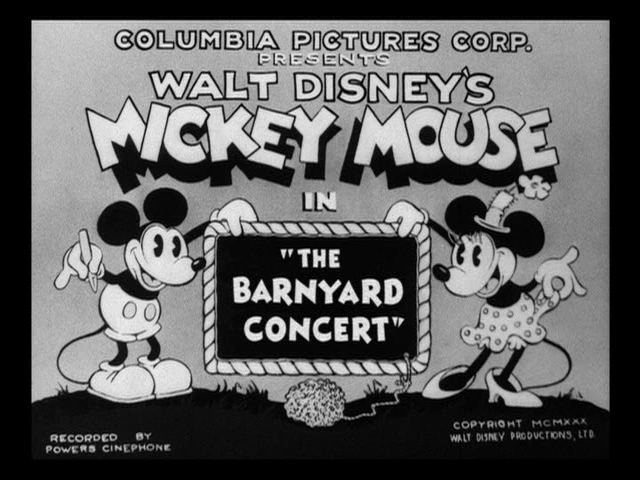
- Title card
- Directed by: Walt Disney
- Produced by: Walt Disney
- Music by: Bert Lewis
- Production company: Walt Disney Productions
- Distributed by: Columbia Pictures
- Release date: April 5, 1930
- Running time: 5:58
- Country: United States
- Language: English

The Barnyard Concert is a 1930 American animated short film directed by Walt Disney. It was released on April 5, 1930. It is the seventeenth film in the Mickey Mouse film series.

Due to being published in 1930, the cartoon entered the public domain on January 1, 2026.

== Plot ==
The short.

Mickey Mouse conducts an orchestral performance on the farm, with an orchestra of cats, dogs, horses, cows, pigs and goats. They play the overture from Franz von Suppé's Poet and Peasant at Mickey's direction. Some of the animals find themselves in conflict—a dog's tuba playing disturbs a pig's toupee, and a goat spanks another pig with his violin bow. Mickey creates music by pulling the tails of baby pigs, and a horse plays drums on the rear end of a cow. At the end of the short, Mickey—tired of being hassled by a cow's tail—ties the tail to a bucket of water, and the cow upends the bucket on Mickey's head. Mickey shivers and whimpers as the concert comes to an end.

== Production ==
This is the first cartoon to include a horse and a cow that would soon evolve into Horace Horsecollar and Clarabelle Cow, two members of Mickey's early supporting cast. Neither animal has lines, or the costumes that they would later adopt, but the resemblance is clear. The film has no dialogue.

Some of the animation in this short was reused in the 1931 short The Castaway.

Mickey would return to the music of Franz von Suppé in 1942's Symphony Hour, when he conducts the Light Cavalry Overture.

== Reception ==
According to Gijs Gorb in Mickey's Movies: The Theatrical Films of Mickey Mouse: "Unfortunately, at this stage, the animators (after Ub Iwerks' departure) still had problems with Mickey's eyes: in one close-up in particular they are placed awkwardly in his face. In a few other scenes, Mickey still is very bland. His best moments are when he's confronted by a pig repeatedly playing a wrong note on the trumpet and when he gets dragged around by a cow's tail."

It has been noted that this cartoon is an early example of the cinematic cliche of a conductor tapping his baton on the music stand to indicate to the orchestra that the song is about to begin, an action which never happens in actual concert performing. Mickey performs the action again when he plays a conductor in 1935's The Band Concert.

The use of "earthy" barnyard humor has also been noted, with this cartoon serving as an example of the Mickey Mouse series' evolving sense of propriety. In Screen, J.P. Telotte observed: "The cows -- as well as the barnyard world and humor they connote -- do not quite disappear. Rather, they slowly become conventionalized, as in the gradually developing persona of Clarabelle the Cow, for example. They eventually become discreetly clothed, their udders carefully hidden beneath skirts, dresses and uniforms, even their narrative roles altered, as can easily be gauged by comparing the similar subjects of The Barnyard Concert from 1930 and The Band Concert from 1935. In the former, a cow flautist has her udders dangling into the foreground, forming an obstacle as Mickey tries to lead his rustic orchestra, while another cow's rear becomes an instrument for the drummer. In the latter, all the animal players are elaborately uniformed and seemingly disciplined musicians, and rather than leading into a scene or getting in the way, they are increasingly relegated to the background or peripheral spaces of the films."

Motion Picture News (July 5, 1930) said: "Mickey Mouse conducts an orchestra composed of various barnyard animals, the "Poet and Peasant" overture being played from start to finish. There are enough good gags in it to keep the chuckles going at a steady pace."

== Home media ==
The short was released on December 7, 2004, on Walt Disney Treasures: Mickey Mouse in Black and White, Volume Two: 1929-1935.

== See also ==
- The Band Concert
