= Walt Disney Treasures: Wave Four =

Digital video disc collection

The fourth wave of Walt Disney Treasures was released December 7, 2004. This is the only wave that comes in White cases, and is the final wave that is in double DVD cases. Starting with this wave, the side strap was replaced with seal wrap with stickers and the back was no longer printed on the tin but included as a card glued to the back.

== Mickey Mouse in Black and White, Volume Two ==

This set covers the remaining Mickey Mouse cartoon shorts released in black and white. 175,000 sets were produced.

=== Disc one ===
==== 1929 ====
- The Barn Dance
- The Opry House
- When the Cat's Away
- The Barnyard Battle
- The Plowboy
- Mickey's Choo-Choo
- The Jazz Fool
- Jungle Rhythm
- Wild Waves

==== 1930 ====
- Just Mickey (also known as Fiddling Around)
- The Barnyard Concert
- The Cactus Kid
- The Shindig
- The Picnic

==== 1931 ====
- Traffic Troubles
- The Castaway
- Fishin' Around
- The Beach Party
- The Barnyard Broadcast

==== 1932 ====
- The Mad Dog
- Barnyard Olympics

==== Bonus features ====
- "Mickey Mania: Collecting Mickey Merchandise": Maltin visits Bernie Shine, collector extraordinaire. They discuss what makes Mickey so appealing, then take a look at Shine's vast collection of Mickey memorabilia.
- "Mickey's Portrait Artist: John Hench": Maltin interviews Disney artist John Hench, who was in charge of painting Mickey for his birthdays throughout the years.

=== Disc two ===
==== 1932 ====
- Musical Farmer
- Trader Mickey
- The Wayward Canary

==== 1933 ====
- Mickey's Pal Pluto
- Mickey's Mechanical Man

==== 1934 ====
- Playful Pluto
- Mickey's Steam Roller
- Mickey Plays Papa

==== 1935 ====
- Mickey's Kangaroo

==== From the vault ====
===== 1929 =====
- The Haunted House

===== 1931 =====
- The Moose Hunt
- The Delivery Boy

===== 1932 =====
- The Grocery Boy
- Mickey in Arabia
- Mickey's Good Deed

===== 1933 =====
- Mickey's Mellerdrammer
- The Steeplechase

===== 1934 =====
- Shanghaied

===== 1935 =====
- Mickey's Man Friday

==== Bonus features ====
- "Background paintings": Backgrounds of the various cartoon shorts on this set
- "Animation drawings": Drawings of the same cartoons, animating and storyboard
- "Mickey's Poster Archive": Posters for many of the shorts shown on this set
- "Mickey Mouse Fully Covered": Various merchandise covers, such as books, magazines and records
- "Mickey's Sunday Funnies": This section shows off the comic strips of the many Mickey adventures, complete with a biography of creator Floyd Gottfredson.

== The Complete Pluto, Volume One ==

This set covers the first half of Pluto's career. 110,000 sets were produced.

=== Disc one ===
==== 1930 ====
- The Chain Gang (replaced by The Beach Party on region 2 editions)

==== 1935 ====
- On Ice

==== 1937 ====
- Pluto's Quin-puplets

==== 1939 ====
- Beach Picnic

==== 1940 ====
- Bone Trouble

==== 1941 ====
- Pluto's Playmate
- Canine Caddy
- Lend a Paw

==== 1942 ====
- The Army Mascot
- Pluto, Junior
- The Sleepwalker
- T-Bone for Two
- Pluto at the Zoo

==== Bonus Features ====
- The Life and Times of Pluto: Maltin discusses Pluto's characteristics with current animator Andreas Deja, long-time animators Frank Thomas and Ollie Johnston, and animation historian John Canemaker.
- Pluto 101: Maltin again meets with Deja, who tells how studying classic cartoon shorts helps him animate successfully. He then shows how to bring Pluto to life from just one circle, the way he did in a sequence for the 1990 featurette The Prince and the Pauper.

=== Disc two ===
==== 1943 ====
- Pluto and the Armadillo
- Private Pluto

==== 1944 ====
- Springtime for Pluto
- First Aiders

==== 1945 ====
- Dog Watch
- Canine Casanova
- The Legend of Coyote Rock
- Canine Patrol

==== 1946 ====
- Pluto's Kid Brother
- In Dutch
- Squatter's Rights
- The Purloined Pup

==== 1947 ====
- Pluto's Housewarming

==== From the Vault ====
- Pantry Pirate (1940)
- A Gentleman's Gentleman (1941)

==== Bonus Features ====
- Pluto's Picture Book: This is the second half of the Disneyland episode A Story of Dogs, which was aired as part of a promotion for Lady and the Tramp (the making of which the first half of this episode covers). Walt talks about Disney's first canine star, using a picture book.
- Pluto's Pal Fergy: A mini-biography about "the man behind the mutt": Norman Ferguson, who created the character.
- Galleries
  - Pluto On Paper: Shows several Pluto comic strips, and book and magazine covers. The comics are designed so one can actually read along frame by frame.
  - Pluto's Posters: Shows posters for many of the cartoons presented on this set.
  - Background Paintings: Shows the backdrops for some of the cartoons presented.
  - Animation Drawings: Shows drawings and storyboards for the same cartoons as in the "Background Paintings" section.

== The Mickey Mouse Club ==

This set contains the first week of the Mickey Mouse Club program, originally broadcast October 3–7, 1955. 130,000 sets were produced.

=== Disc one ===
==== Episodes ====
- Fun With Music Day (Monday)
- Guest Star Day (Tuesday)
- Anything Can Happen Day (Wednesday)

==== Bonus Features ====
- The Leader of the Club
- Galleries
  - Inside the Clubhouse
  - Spreading the Word: Mouseke-Promotion
  - Sketching the Ideas

=== Disc two ===
==== Episodes ====
- Circus Day (Thursday)
- Talent Round-Up Day (Friday)

==== Bonus Features ====
- Mouseke-Memories
- The Mouseketeers Debut at Disneyland
- Opening Sequence in Color
