= Trader Mickey =

1932 film by David Hand

- Title card
- Directed by: David Hand
- Produced by: Walt Disney
- Starring: Walt Disney
- Color process: Black and white
- Production company: Walt Disney Productions
- Distributed by: United Artists
- Release date: August 20, 1932
- Running time: 7 min
- Country: United States
- Language: English

Trader Mickey is a 1932 American animated short film directed by David Hand. It is the 45th film in the Mickey Mouse series and the first film to be directed by Hand, who would become one of the studio's most prominent directors.

== Plot ==
Mickey and Pluto are exploring in Africa taking their trading boat down a jungle river. They come across a tribe of hostile cannibals who take Mickey's things and try and cook the explorers. Later, as the tribe goes through Mickey's goods, they discover several musical instruments. When Mickey teaches them how to play the instruments, they decide not to cook him.

== Home media ==
The short was released on December 7, 2004, on Walt Disney Treasures: Mickey Mouse in Black and White, Volume Two.

== See also ==
- Mickey Mouse (film series)
