= Musical Farmer =

1932 film by Wilfred Jackson

- Title card
- Directed by: Wilfred Jackson
- Produced by: Walt Disney
- Starring: Walt Disney
- Color process: Black and white
- Production company: Walt Disney Productions
- Distributed by: Columbia Pictures
- Release date: June 8, 1932
- Running time: 7 min
- Country: United States
- Language: English

Musical Farmer is a 1932 American animated short film directed by Wilfred Jackson. It is the 42nd film of the Mickey Mouse series.

== Plot ==
Mickey plants seeds with Pluto. When Mickey sees Minnie milking a cow, he decides to sneak up on her and scare her with him and Pluto inside a scarecrow. Eventually Mickey is found out and he and Minnie play music with the animals and other improvised instruments. Later Mickey tries to photograph a humongous egg laid by one of the hens.

== Home media ==
The short was released on December 7, 2004, on Walt Disney Treasures: Mickey Mouse in Black and White, Volume Two.

== See also ==
- Mickey Mouse (film series)
