= The Castaway (film) =

1931 film by Wilfred Jackson

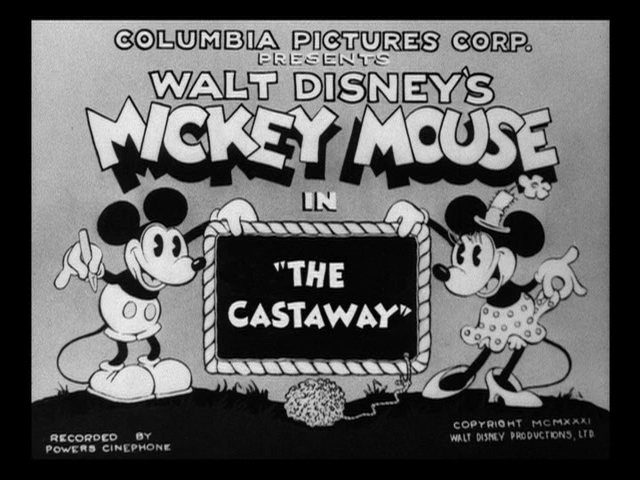
- Directed by: Wilfred Jackson
- Produced by: Walt Disney
- Starring: Walt Disney
- Music by: Frank Churchill
- Color process: Black and white
- Production company: Walt Disney Productions
- Distributed by: Columbia Pictures
- Release date: March 27, 1931
- Running time: 7 min
- Country: United States
- Language: English

The Castaway is a 1931 American animated short film directed by Wilfred Jackson. It is the 27th film of the Mickey Mouse film series. It mostly makes use of reused animation.

The short is also the first to be scored by Frank Churchill, who went on to write the songs for Three Little Pigs, Snow White and the Seven Dwarfs, Dumbo, Bambi and The Adventures of Ichabod and Mr. Toad.

== Plot ==
Stranded on a lonely raft in the ocean, Mickey Mouse spies an island ahead. He reaches the island with the unwilling help of a local swordfish. Hungry, he shakes a banana tree, and down falls a banana. Then he gets frightened away by a spider. A waterlogged piano is washed up on the shore, and Mickey plays for a trio of dancing seals. A young tiger tries to help by banging on the keys, and Mickey tries to shoo him away. The pair are interrupted by a giant ape, who turns out to be an accomplished pianist himself, but ends up smashing the piano. Mickey tries to fight back, but is intimidated and dances away. He gets chased by a lion, who accidentally jumps into a crocodile's mouth. Mickey finds himself riding on a turtle, which swims away.

== Voice cast ==
- Mickey Mouse: Walt Disney

== Reception ==
In Mickey's Movies: The Theatrical Films of Mickey Mouse, Gijs Grob writes: "The Castaway was a short built around reused, inferior material, and it shows: the cartoon is enjoyable, but Mickey's looks are wildly inconsistent, there's not even a hint of a story, and the whole film feels like a throwback to 1929."

In contrast, on the Disney Film Project, Ryan Kilpatrick praises the short: "This is a very fun short, although there are not a ton of gags, and none nearly as good as Traffic Troubles or some of the other funny Mickey shorts. There is a tone of happiness that is set almost from the beginning, as Mickey is tossed by the waves on his little raft. Even though things are bleak, Mickey is smiling. It is this cheerful optimism that makes Mickey so appealing."

== Home media ==
The short was released on December 7, 2004, on Walt Disney Treasures: Mickey Mouse in Black and White, Volume Two: 1929-1935.
