= Barnyard Olympics =

1932 film by Wilfred Jackson

- Title card
- Directed by: Wilfred Jackson
- Produced by: Walt Disney
- Starring: Walt Disney
- Color process: Black and white
- Production company: Walt Disney Productions
- Distributed by: Columbia Pictures
- Release date: April 13, 1932
- Running time: 7 min
- Country: United States
- Language: English

Barnyard Olympics is a 1932 American animated short film directed by Wilfred Jackson. It is the 40th film of the Mickey Mouse series. It is the first animated film produced to be a tie-in to the Olympic Games, being released to coincide with the 1932 Summer Olympics in Los Angeles.

== Plot ==
Several characters participate in the Olympic Games including boxing and diving. Mickey himself participates in the main event, a cross-country multi-sport race similar to a Triathlon, except it includes row boating instead of swimming. Another participant in the race (possibly Pete) tries to sabotage Mickey's chances of winning along the way.

== Reception ==
In a contemporary review, Motion Picture Herald said: "Mickey overrules them and wins, and in highly amusing animated fashion."

== Home media ==
The short was released on December 7, 2004, on Walt Disney Treasures: Mickey Mouse in Black and White, Volume Two.

== See also ==
- Mickey Mouse (film series)
