= Mickey's Pal Pluto =

1933 film by Burt Gillett

- Directed by: Burt Gillett
- Produced by: Walt Disney
- Starring: Walt Disney
- Color process: Black and white
- Production company: Walt Disney Productions
- Distributed by: United Artists
- Release date: February 18, 1933
- Running time: 7 min
- Country: United States
- Language: English

Mickey's Pal Pluto is a 1933 American animated short film directed by Burt Gillett. It is the 53rd film of the Mickey Mouse film series. It was remade in Technicolor in 1941 as Lend a Paw, which won the Academy Award for Best Animated Short Film at the 14th Academy Awards in 1942.

== Plot ==
Pluto saves a litter of kittens from drowning, but later becomes jealous when Mickey and Minnie Mouse take the kittens into the house and are treated like part of the family. As Pluto tries to guard his territory from the kittens, he causes a ruckus and Mickey throws him out of the house. Later the kittens come outside and fall down a well, giving Pluto a moral dilemma of whether or not to save them a second time. He saves the kittens on time and is rewarded with a roast chicken.

== Home media ==
The short was released on December 7, 2004, on Walt Disney Treasures: Mickey Mouse in Black and White, Volume Two.

== Legacy ==
Pluto's angel and devil reappeared, played by Eric Idle and Penn Jillette respectively, in two episodes of Mickey Mouse Works - "Pluto's Kittens" (1999) and "Minnie Takes Care of Pluto" (2000) - as well as a 2002 episode of House of Mouse, "Pluto vs Figaro", and in the Mickey Mouse episode, "Easy Street"; in the latter, the angel actually agrees with the devil's plan remarking "Amen".

== See also ==
- Mickey Mouse (film series)
