= Jungle Rhythm =

1929 film by Walt Disney

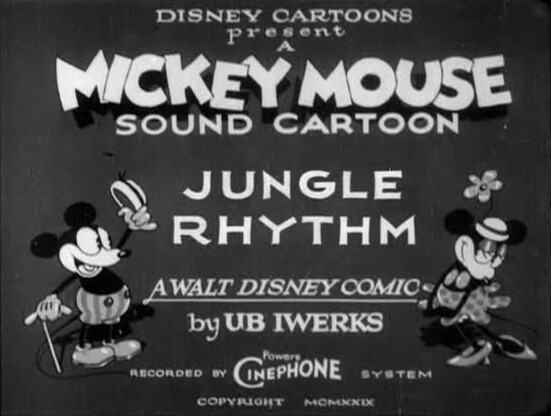
- Directed by: Walt Disney
- Produced by: Walt Disney
- Starring: Walt Disney
- Music by: Carl W. Stalling
- Animation by: Ub Iwerks; Ben Sharpsteen
- Production company: Disney Cartoons
- Distributed by: Celebrity Productions
- Release date: November 15, 1929
- Running time: 6:53
- Country: United States
- Language: English

Jungle Rhythm is a 1929 American animated short film directed by Walt Disney. It is the thirteenth film of the Mickey Mouse series. It was the thirteenth Mickey Mouse short to be produced, the tenth of that year. It was released on November 15, 1929 by Celebrity Productions. Columbia Pictures reissued the film after Walt Disney Productions switched distributors.

== Plot ==
The short

Mickey Mouse wanders into a jungle and comes across several animals, including elephants, monkeys and lions. A monkey and parrot begin playing a tune on Mickey's accordion and it turns into a concert for the jungle animals. Mickey dances with a lion, a bear and a pair of monkeys to the tune of Johann Strauss' The Blue Danube. Then a pair of ostriches dance as Mickey plays "Auld Lang Syne" on a makeshift saxophone. Mickey continues with "Aloha 'Oe", "Turkey in the Straw" and "Yankee Doodle", and the animals applaud.

== Legacy ==
Jungle Rhythm was the inspiration for the first adventure storyline in the 1930 Mickey Mouse comic strip.

Jungle Rhythm is additionally a "Projector Screen" level in the 2010 Wii game Epic Mickey. It sets apart Mean Street and Ventureland and later Tortooga and its nearby jungle.

== Reception ==
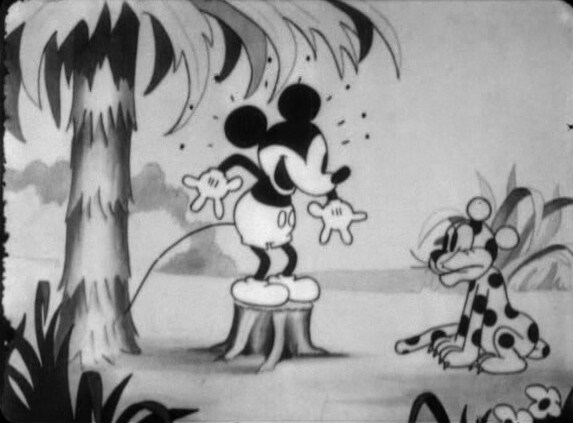
Mickey being curious about a leopard

Disney had some trouble with the state censors over this cartoon, due to the suggestive hula-dancing lion.

In his book Mickey's Movies: The Theatrical Films of Mickey Mouse, Gijs Grob writes: "Jungle Rhythm is one of the most boring early Mickey Mouse shorts: there's no plot, no dialogue, no song, and the dance routines resemble the worst in contemporary Silly Symphonies. Moreover, it remains unclear what Mickey, who until now we had known is a barnyard and small-town dweller, is doing in the jungle."

In the Disney Film Project, Ryan Kilpatrick observes: "Ub Iwerks' silly dancing numbers are constantly amusing. We get two monkeys in one sequence and two ostriches in another. We also get a lion that pushes its mane down to use as a grass skirt and become a hula dancer. All three are great flowing animation that are fun to watch, even if they're not necessarily story driven."

The Film Daily (December 8, 1929) wrote: "Mickey, Master Musician: The jungle beasts serving Mickey as musical instruments. His playing is such as to set the whole animal population a-dancing. In fact, it is his musical ability alone that stands between him and annihilation. The little fellow is fully aware that 'music soothes the savage breast'. He reveals an amazing mastery of every instrument. Again Mickey shows that he is a performer to be relied upon. Plenty of fun, especially for the young."

Motion Picture News (January 11, 1930) said: "Mark this down as a real laugh-getter. Mickey Mouse in the jungle getting the whole animal gang going by virtue of his musical ramblings on a wide variety of instruments. There are a number of clever gags which assure it many real laughs."

== Home media ==
The short was released on December 7, 2004, on Walt Disney Treasures: Mickey Mouse in Black and White, Volume Two: 1929-1935.

== See also ==
- Mickey Mouse (film series)
