= The Wayward Canary =

1932 film by Burt Gillett

- Directed by: Burt Gillett
- Produced by: Walt Disney
- Starring: Walt Disney
- Color process: Black and white
- Production company: Walt Disney Productions
- Distributed by: United Artists
- Release date: November 12, 1932
- Running time: 7 min
- Country: United States
- Language: English

The Wayward Canary is a 1932 American animated short film directed by Burt Gillett. It is the 48th film of the Mickey Mouse series.

== Plot ==
Mickey gives Minnie a canary as a present. The canary turns out to have several babies. The birds get loose in Minnie's house and cause problems. Pluto later saves the canary from a cat.

== Home media ==
The short was released on December 7, 2004, on Walt Disney Treasures: Mickey Mouse in Black and White, Volume Two.

== See also ==
- Mickey Mouse (film series)
