= R'coon Dawg =

1951 Mickey Mouse cartoon

- Directed by: Charles A. Nichols
- Story by: Ralph Wright; Albert Bertino
- Produced by: Walt Disney
- Starring: Jimmy MacDonald; Pinto Colvig
- Music by: Paul Smith
- Animation by: Charles A. Nichols; Norm Ferguson; Marvin Woodward; Fred Moore; Jack Boyd
- Layouts by: Lance Nolley
- Backgrounds by: Art Riley
- Color process: Technicolor
- Production company: Walt Disney Productions
- Distributed by: RKO Radio Pictures
- Release date: August 10, 1951
- Running time: 7 minutes
- Language: English

R'coon Dawg is a 1951 American animated short film produced by Walt Disney and directed by Charles August Nichols. It was the 123rd short in the Mickey Mouse film series to be released, and the only one produced that year.

Even though this cartoon belongs to the Mickey Mouse series, and Mickey Mouse is shown in hunting gear, Pluto is the main character.

== Plot ==
Mickey and Pluto are hunting a raccoon, who is quite clever and intends to make fun of his pursuers.

== Voice cast ==
- Pluto: Pinto Colvig
- Mickey Mouse: Jimmy MacDonald

== Home media ==
The short was released on May 18, 2004, on Walt Disney Treasures: Mickey Mouse in Living Color, Volume Two: 1939-Today.

== See also ==
- Mickey Mouse (film series)
