= Pluto's Party =

1952 Mickey Mouse cartoon

- Directed by: Milt Schaffer
- Written by: Bill Berg; Leo Salkin
- Story by: Bill Berg; Leo Salkin
- Produced by: Walt Disney; John Sutherland
- Starring: Jimmy MacDonald; Ruth Clifford; Pinto Colvig
- Music by: Oliver Wallace
- Animation by: Norman Ferguson; Fred Moore; Charles A. Nichols; Marvin Woodward; Blaine Gibson (effects)
- Layouts by: Lance Nolley
- Backgrounds by: Thelma Witmer
- Color process: Technicolor
- Production company: Walt Disney Productions
- Distributed by: RKO Radio Pictures
- Release date: September 19, 1952
- Running time: 6 minutes
- Country: United States
- Language: English

Pluto's Party is a cartoon in the Mickey Mouse series, produced by Walt Disney Productions and released by RKO Radio Pictures on September 19, 1952. It was the 124th short in the Mickey Mouse film series to be released, and the first for that year.

== Plot ==
It's Pluto's birthday and Mickey Mouse is busy preparing the party things for his birthday dog. First, Pluto tries to eat the cake, but is caught by Mickey when it is time for his bath. As soon as Pluto is neat and tidy, he tries to eat the cake, but is spotted by Mickey again. Then, Mickey's nephews barge the gate down and trample all over Pluto as they hurry to the party. The children give Pluto a small red wagon and treat him like a workhorse. They then all start to enjoy themselves at the party. They first take Pluto on the slide, then barge down the swing. Then, they play pin the tail on Pluto. Soon it is time for lunch and Pluto wants to have a piece of his own cake, but Mickey's nephews grab every slice and eat it up, to Pluto's horror. Having devoured Pluto's birthday cake, they drink from their cups and leave. Pluto throws a tantrum, knocking away all the dishes until Mickey passes him the last slice of the birthday cake that he saved. Pluto eats the cake, licking Mickey between bites.

== Voice cast ==
- Pluto: Pinto Colvig
- Mickey Mouse: Jimmy MacDonald
- Mickey's Nephews: Ruth Clifford

== Reception ==
In Mickey's Movies: The Theatrical Films of Mickey Mouse, Gijs Grob writes: "Sadly, it's not a success. The animation, despite being done by such veterans as Marvin Woodward, Fred Moore, and Norm Ferguson, feels cheaper than usual, and the timing is surprisingly sloppy, making most of the gags fall flat... You can almost feel the series ending in this cartoon."

== Home media ==
The short was released on May 18, 2004, on Walt Disney Treasures: Mickey Mouse in Living Color, Volume Two: 1939-Today.

== See also ==
- Mickey Mouse (film series)
