= Mickey in Arabia =

1932 film by Wilfred Jackson

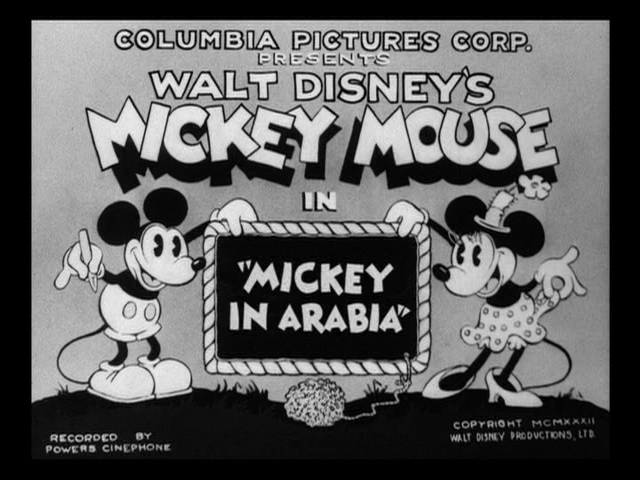
- Title card
- Directed by: Wilfred Jackson
- Produced by: Walt Disney
- Starring: Walt Disney; Marcellite Garner
- Color process: Black-and-white
- Production company: Walt Disney Productions
- Distributed by: Columbia Pictures
- Release date: July 11, 1932
- Running time: 6 min
- Country: United States
- Language: English

Mickey in Arabia is a 1932 American animated short film directed by Wilfred Jackson. It is the 43rd film of the Mickey Mouse series and the final film of the series to be released by Columbia Pictures, as Disney switched distributors to United Artists.

== Plot ==
Mickey and Minnie are riding camel-back through the Arabian Desert and happen upon a lively town. Dismounting within, the mice take some amusing photographs whilst their naughty camel slurps up the contents of a beer barrel. As Minnie Mouse backs away with her camera from Mickey, who is posing for the shot, a sultan (portrayed as Mickey's nemesis Pete) abducts her from behind a fence.

Mickey takes to the chase, but his intoxicated camel is of little use; finding out the sultan's palace, the mouse scales the wall and, through a window, enters a room in the building, where he finds a screaming Minnie struggling against the amorous villain. Breaking the sultan's grasp, Mickey becomes the target of the sultan's bullets. He hides Minnie in a flower pot, and prevails, through chance, over the sultan's well-armed men.

Mickey is pursued (while delicately balancing the flower pot in his hands) by the sultan himself, out the window, up the spiral stairway leading to the palace roof, thence to the next building over, where he drops the pot, only rescuing Minnie from the fall at the building's edge, from which he slips on account of a loose brick.

Minnie and Mickey fall into an awning: the angry sultan, still in pursuit, leaps from the same edge, compelling Mickey to retract the awning, making the sultan's fall considerably less pleasant. The spears of the sultan's warriors, similarly avoided, make their way to the helplessly entombed sultan. The sultan rushes off, in pain, into the distance. Mickey calls his camel, and, with Minnie, rides off happily.

== Voice cast ==
- Mickey Mouse: Walt Disney
- Minnie Mouse: Marcellite Garner
- Pete: Pinto Colvig
- Camel: unknown
- Armed men: unknown

== Home media ==
The short was released on December 7, 2004, on Walt Disney Treasures: Mickey Mouse in Black and White, Volume Two: 1929-1935.

== See also ==
- Mickey Mouse (film series)
