= The Grocery Boy =

1932 film by Wilfred Jackson

- Title card
- Directed by: Wilfred Jackson
- Produced by: Walt Disney
- Starring: Walt Disney
- Color process: Black and white
- Production company: Walt Disney Productions
- Distributed by: Columbia Pictures
- Release date: February 8, 1932
- Running time: 7 min
- Country: United States
- Language: English

The Grocery Boy is a 1932 American animated short film directed by Wilfred Jackson. It is the 38th film of the Mickey Mouse series.

== Plot ==
Mickey and Pluto go grocery shopping for Minnie and later help her cook. Pluto misbehaves and tries to steal the turkey which leads to a disaster.

== Reception ==
In a contemporary review, Motion Picture Herald said: "The usual standard of these cartoons is upheld."

== Home media ==
The short was released on December 7, 2004, on Walt Disney Treasures: Mickey Mouse in Black and White, Volume Two.

== See also ==
- Mickey Mouse (film series)
