= The Jazz Fool =

1929 film by Walt Disney

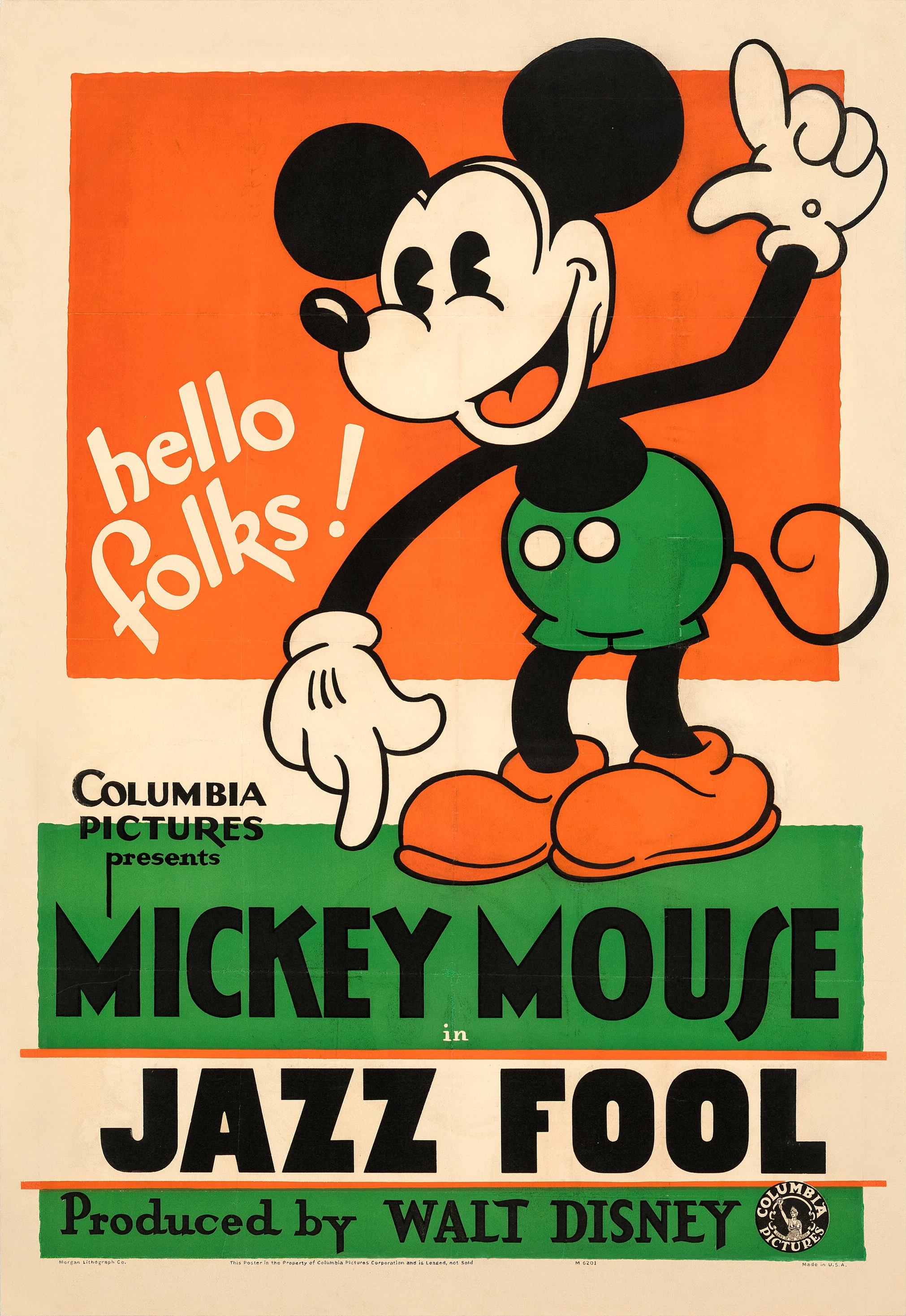
- Theatrical release poster
- Directed by: Walt Disney
- Produced by: Walt Disney
- Music by: Carl Stalling
- Production company: Disney Cartoons
- Distributed by: Celebrity Pictures
- Release date: October 15, 1929
- Running time: 5:57
- Country: United States
- Language: English

The Jazz Fool is a 1929 American animated short film directed by Walt Disney. It is the twelfth film of the Mickey Mouse film series. It was the twelfth Mickey Mouse short to be produced, the ninth of that year. It was released on October 15, 1929, by Celebrity Productions. Columbia Pictures reissued the film after Walt Disney Productions switched distributors.

The cartoon's title combines the titles of two Al Jolson films: The Jazz Singer (1927) and The Singing Fool (1928). An early version of Horace Horsecollar appears, but is not yet the anthropomorphized character that he later evolves into.

The only dialogue is Mickey singing to a tune using "dohs".

== Plot ==
The short

Mickey Mouse arrives in town riding in a horse-drawn cart labeled "Mickey's Big Road Show", playing the organ. His horse dances, as do various animals following close behind the cart. Two cows (who both look like Clarabelle Cow) dance in the barnyard, and so do the clothes hanging on a washline.

Reaching a fair, the horse plays percussion as Mickey plays his organ. When the song ends, Mickey takes the stage and plays piano aggressively, ultimately having a fistfight with the instrument. At the end of the concert, the piano takes its revenge by biting Mickey in the rear end.

== Production ==
This is the second Mickey Mouse cartoon involving a piano concert, following The Opry House, which was released seven months earlier in March 1929. It includes some gags recycled from the earlier cartoon.

== Reception ==
In Mickey's Movies: The Theatrical Films of Mickey Mouse, Gijs Grob points out that "The Jazz Fool is one of those early Mickey Mouse shorts with a lot of musical performances, but no plot. However, there's plenty of action, and Mickey's piano performance is still entertaining today."

On the Disney Film Project, Ryan Kilpatrick writes: "The best [part] is the personality animation of Mickey, showing his anger, frustration or happiness at what he's playing on the piano. It's very well done, with simple moves of the eyebrow and eyes, turns of his mouth, or the direction of his nose or shoulders expressing the entire emotion. It's a very expressive Mickey, part of the evolution of his character over the last few shorts."

Motion Picture News (November 9, 1929) said: "Lots of Laughs: This is an ideal comedy short to be placed on the same program a picture such as Is Everybody Happy? The gags in the piano playing stunt are enough to make any short get over. The calliope opening gets a number of laughs."

== Home media ==
The short was released on December 7, 2004, on Walt Disney Treasures: Mickey Mouse in Black and White, Volume Two: 1929-1935.

== See also ==
- Mickey Mouse (film series)
