= Fiddling Around =

1930 film by Walt Disney

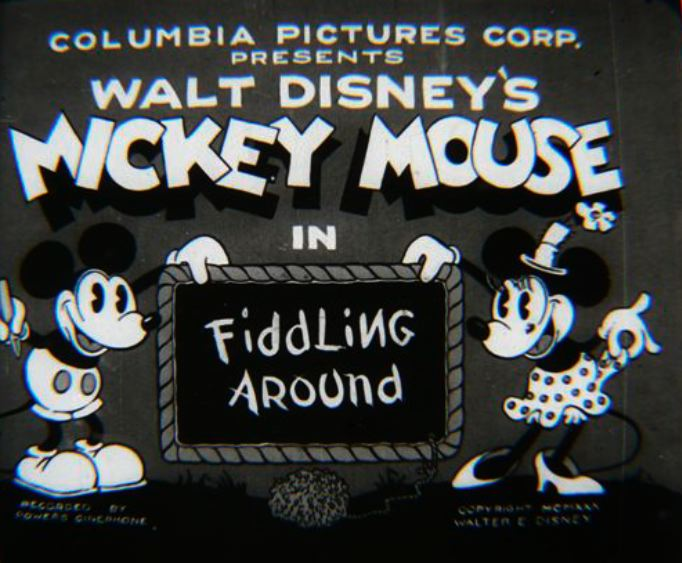
- Original title card
- Directed by: Walt Disney
- Produced by: Walt Disney
- Starring: Walt Disney
- Music by: Bert Lewis
- Animation by: Les Clark
- Color process: Black-and-white
- Production company: Walt Disney Productions
- Distributed by: Columbia Pictures
- Release date: March 6, 1930
- Running time: 6:50
- Language: English

Fiddling Around (Note: While this is the official title, it was copyrighted as Fiddlin' Around, while the alleged working title was Just Mickey.) is a 1930 American animated short film directed by Walt Disney. It is the sixteenth film of the Mickey Mouse series, the first without any involvement from Ub Iwerks and Carl W. Stalling, as well as the first to be distributed by Columbia Pictures.

The film is a one-person show with Mickey Mouse playing a violin on stage; Mickey is the only character to appear in the film, apart from the unseen audience including an equally unseen heckler. Along with other Mickey Mouse shorts produced the same year, Fiddling Around entered the public domain on January 1, 2026.

== Plot ==
The full short (under the name Just Mickey).

Curtains part, and Mickey Mouse enters a stage, with his violin, to a more or less receptive audience. Mickey plays Traumerei and the Hungarian Dance no. 5, until he is overwhelmed by emotions and leaves the stage. The audience cheers, the mouse re-enters, and as an encore plays the last measure of the William Tell overture; mockingly laughed at by one particular heckler, he nonetheless plays the piece to great success despite breaking his instrument and bow in half in the process. Then Mickey is crushed by the curtains.

== Title ==
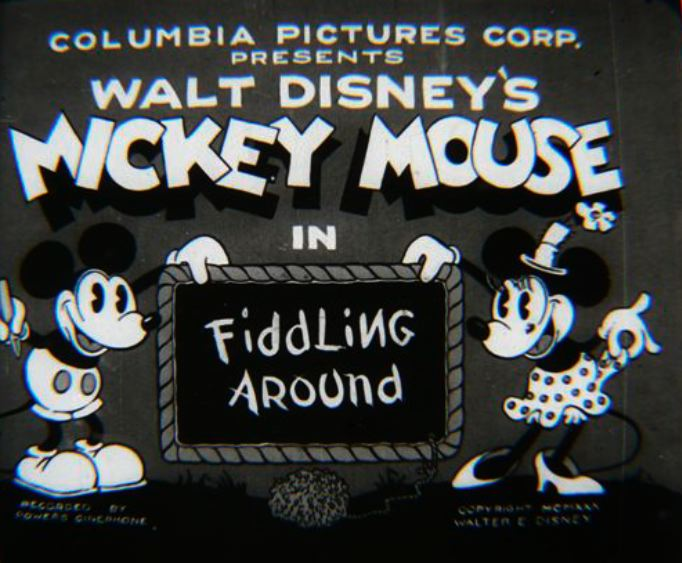
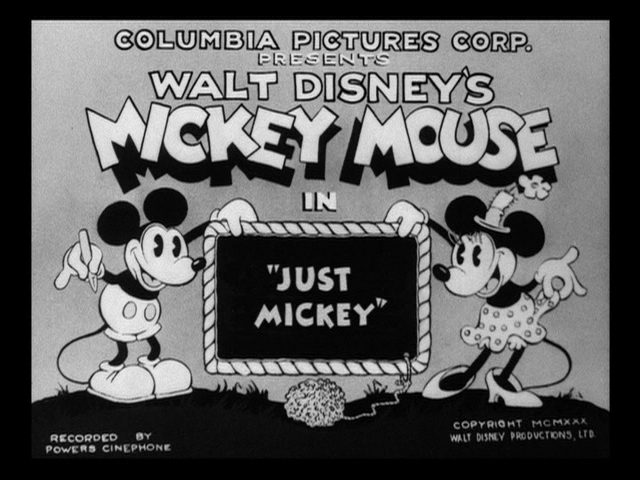
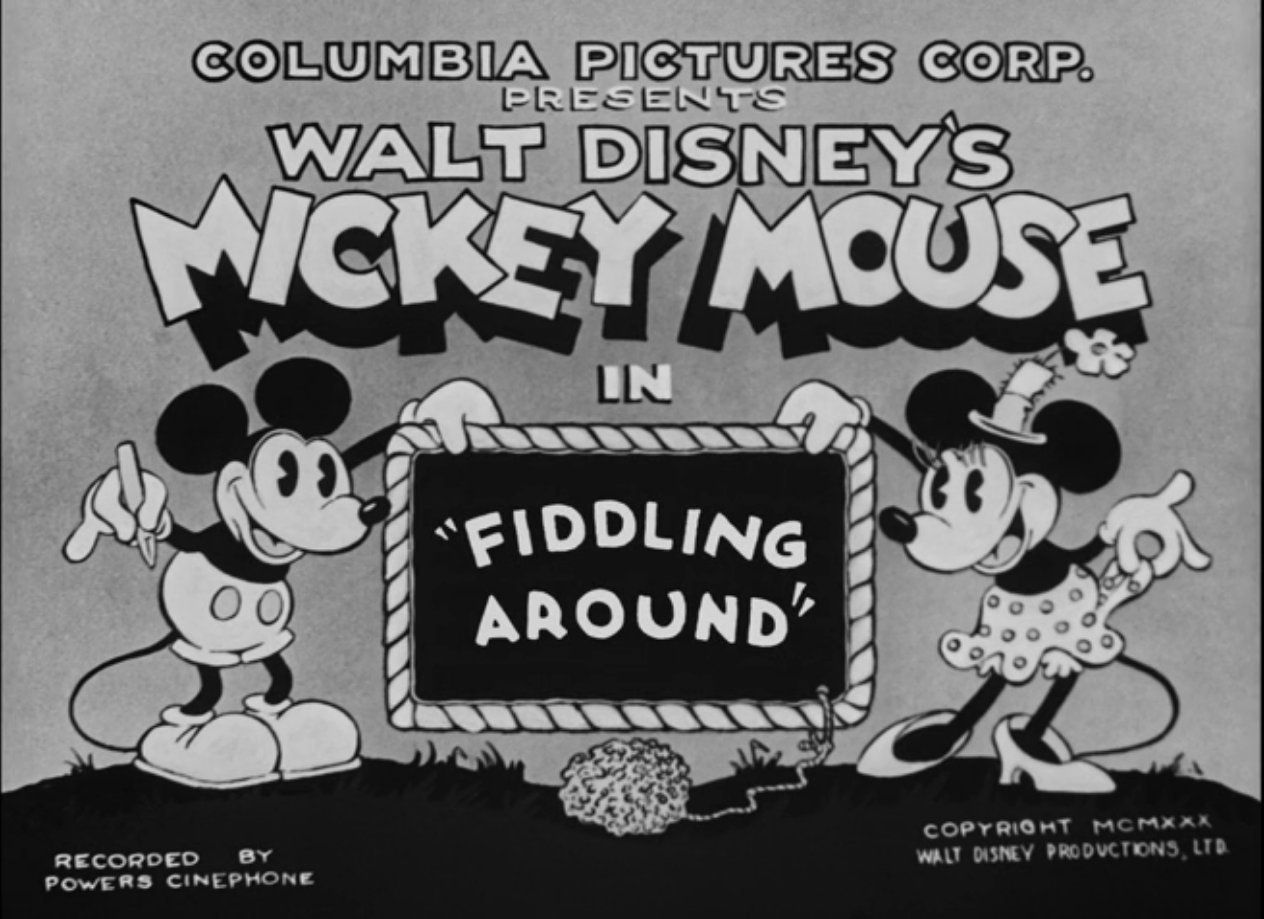
From left to right: title card originally released in 1930 (Fiddling Around), the Walt Disney Treasures 2004 DVD release using the Just Mickey title, and the one used on the Disney+ release, once again using Fiddling Around.

An issue concerning this cartoon is whether the title of the short is Fiddling Around, Fiddlin' Around or Just Mickey. Leonard Maltin writes that the cartoon was copyrighted as Fiddlin' Around, and this was seen on the original theatrical poster, while Just Mickey is its common title and was shown on the recreated title card seen on the 2004 Walt Disney Treasures DVD release Mickey Mouse In Black And White: Volume 2, as no original release print with the title had yet surfaced.

In 2009, David Gerstein uncovered an original 1930 release print which shows Fiddling Around, implying that Just Mickey was a working title.

In the 2018 book Mickey Mouse: The Ultimate History, Gerstein was more definitive: "Many latter-day reference sources have identified this film by its working title, Just Mickey, which was used in some pre-release Powers advertising. In fact, however, the final title -- under which the film was copyrighted, distributed by Columbia, advertised, and exhibited -- is Fiddling Around."

== Reception ==
In Mickey's Movies: The Theatrical Films of Mickey Mouse, Gijs Grob observes: "Like other early Mickey cartoons, Just Mickey is more about making music than about plot. But the short features one of Mickey's greatest early concert performances, and it contains some good facial expression animation of Mickey... Moreover, the hand movements in this short are remarkably convincing. Just Mickey is an early showcase of Walt Disney's ambition to improve the art of animation. Being the first Mickey Mouse cartoon after Ub Iwerks' departure in January 1930, it shows the studio could do very well without him."

On the Disney Film Project, Ryan Kirkpatrick agrees: "The thing that keeps your interest... are the expressions on Mickey's face. He goes from annoyance at a heckler, to passion for his playing to happiness at a job well done from moment to moment, with natural transitions, not just jumping from expression to expression... I can imagine the animators took this as a challenge to create a new range of expressions and emotions through Mickey."

The Film Daily (June 8, 1930): "Good Cartoon: As a violin virtuoso, Mickey Mouse has plenty of trouble with broken strings and a tough audience that includes one guy who keeps giving him the horse laugh. But Mickey's acrobatic manipulation of his instrument, with which he promotes plenty of comedy as well as music, puts him over for an encore. A very good comedy of its kind."

Motion Picture News (June 21, 1930): "Fair: There is very little action in this Mickey Mouse cartoon, most of it being devoted to close-ups of Mickey playing classical music on a trick violin. The clever cartoon work, however, makes up for the deficiency in ideas and Mickey's shadow, thrown upon the backdrop by the spotlight, moves in unison with him, giving an effect of depth unusual in cartoons."

Variety (July 9, 1930): "One of the Mickey Mouse series and okay for filler. It's a Walt Disney creation and gets most its novelty from fact that Mickey Mouse does a single for a change. He gets the break from suiting action to music or vice versa with appropriate sounds and gestures. Mickey trots into view for a violin solo and shakes, squirms, acrobats, weeps and otherwise accents his playing. Audience unseen gives him a couple of Bronx cheers to help the situation and Mickey bows out on his back, but still playing the fiddle."

== Home media ==
The short was released on December 7, 2004 on Walt Disney Treasures: Mickey Mouse in Black and White, Volume Two: 1929-1935 under its working title, Just Mickey. It was released to Disney+ on October 6, 2023 under the title Fiddling Around.

== See also ==
- Mickey Mouse (film series)
