= The Beach Party =

1931 film by Burt Gillett

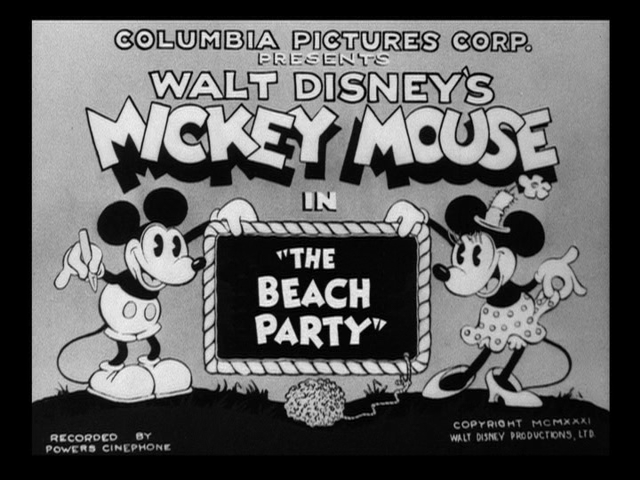
- Title card
- Directed by: Burt Gillett
- Produced by: Walt Disney
- Color process: Black and white
- Production company: Walt Disney Productions
- Distributed by: Columbia Pictures
- Release date: October 28, 1931
- Running time: 7 min
- Country: United States
- Language: English

The Beach Party is a 1931 American animated short film directed by Burt Gillett. It is the 34th film of the Mickey Mouse series.

== Plot ==
Mickey Mouse, Minnie Mouse, Horace Horsecollar and Clarabelle Cow set out for a pleasant day by the sea, with Pluto in tow. Horace has some trouble diving, and Clarabelle loses part of her bathing costume. Pluto tangles with a crab. The gang happily eats lunch. Mickey throws Pluto some sausages, which he follows into the surf. The dog accidentally munches on the tentacle of an octopus, who takes umbrage. The angry octopus destroys the picnic, and the group has to fight it off using dishes and leftovers as weapons. They manage to fend off the octopus' attack, and send it back to the sea.

== Voice cast ==
- Pluto: Lee Millar

== Production ==
The Beach Party shows the foursome of Mickey, Minnie, Horace and Clarabelle spending time together as friends: one of only two times that this happened, the other being Camping Out in 1934.

== Reception ==
In a contemporary review, Motion Picture Herald said: "This one runs ahead, in cleverness, entertainment and amusement, of the usual Walt Disney output... An octopus comes up out of the sea and chases the dog, with results that will make any audience anywhere sit up, laugh and be vastly entertained."

In Mickey's Movies: The Theatrical Films of Mickey Mouse, Gijs Grob writes: "The Beach Party shows that the studio was more capable than any other studio in telling a good gag-filled story leading to a great finale. These were a welcome replacement to the tiring song-and-dance routines."

== Home media ==
The short was released on December 7, 2004 on Walt Disney Treasures: Mickey Mouse in Black and White, Volume Two.

== See also ==
- Mickey Mouse (film series)
