= Traffic Troubles =

1931 film by Burt Gillett

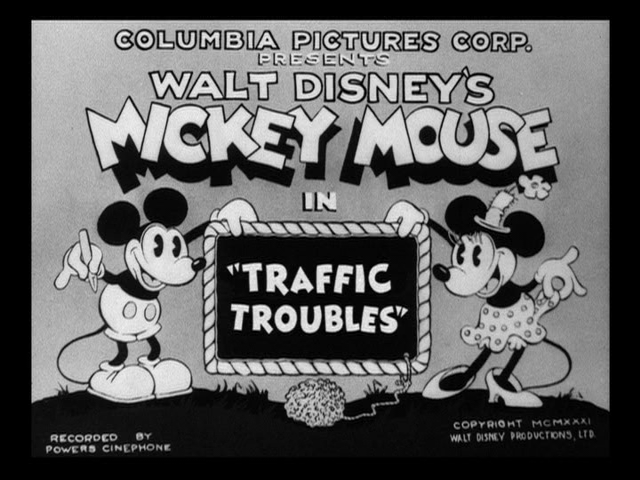
- Title card
- Directed by: Burt Gillett
- Produced by: Walt Disney
- Music by: Bert Lewis
- Color process: Black and white
- Production company: Walt Disney Productions
- Distributed by: Columbia Pictures
- Release date: March 17, 1931
- Running time: 7 min
- Country: United States
- Language: English

Traffic Troubles is a 1931 American animated short film directed by Burt Gillett. It was released on March 17, 1931, as part of the Mickey Mouse film series. It was the twenty-sixth Mickey Mouse short to be produced, and the second of that year.

== Plot ==
Mickey driving his cab

Mickey is driving an anthropomorphized taxicab in the city, and picks up an enormous pig who is so fat that he weighs down the car. An angry cat traffic cop browbeats Mickey for holding up traffic, and Mickey drives away as best he can. Mickey gets in a conflict with a tiny car driven by a dog, and cut each other off until the dog's car sinks into a water-filled pothole. Driving over rough road, the pig falls out of the car, and—after a rather violent parking job—Mickey discovers that his fare is gone.

For his next fare, Minnie Mouse is in a hurry to get to her music lesson, and the pair whistle and play the accordion during the journey. Mickey gets a flat, and has a hard time filling up the tire again. Peg-Leg Pete, wearing a top hat and ragged tuxedo, comes by driving a tricycle marked "Dr. Pep's Snake Oil". He insists on filling up the car with his miracle cure. The car instantly comes to life and speeds away, leaving Mickey behind. By the time he catches up with it, it's careening into a final disastrous crash through a barnyard.

== Voice cast ==
- Mickey Mouse, Peg-Leg Pete: Walt Disney
- Minnie Mouse: Marcellite Garner
- Officer: Parker Spook

== Production ==
According to animator Ben Sharpsteen, the short was inspired by an incident in which Walt Disney was fined by a traffic cop.

Animator David Hand remembered drawing the scene of the taxicab blowing a tire several times for Disney, who wasn't satisfied and said that it didn't have enough exaggerated action. Hand finally drew a sequence so extreme and exaggerated that he thought Disney would get the point, but when Disney saw the sequence, he smiled, "There! You've got it! Why didn't you do it that way in the first place?"

The short was used as the basis for a week-long story arc in Floyd Gottfredson's Mickey Mouse comic strip, published January 12–17, 1931. This was immediately after a week of strips inspired by another short, The Picnic. The week of strips includes a gag cut from the film, with Mickey avoiding a ticket for parking in front of a fire hydrant by disguising the hydrant as a customer.

== Reception ==
In Mickey's Movies: The Theatrical Films of Mickey Mouse, Gijs Grob writes: "Traffic Troubles is a genuine gag cartoon without any songs or dances, but with fast action, plenty of gags building to a grand finale, and spectacular and flexible animation. A particular highlight is a funny scene in which a police officer asks Mickey many questions while silencing him at the same time... Traffic Troubles is the best Mickey Mouse film from 1931, and Mickey's first really great cartoon since Steamboat Willie."

On the Disney Film Project, Ryan Kilpatrick agrees: "All very well done and extremely funny. This may have been the funniest of the Mickey shorts so far."

Variety (May 6, 1931): "Not so much talk and music in this one but plenty of action around a taxi. Neither above or below others in this series. Mickey Mouse has a cab which behaves in a human manner, jumping out of the way of other cars, etc. Some novelty derived from that and the way the car runs away in a fit after trying a tonic. Drawing well defined, photog clear and recording passable."

The Film Daily (May 10, 1931): "Funny. The traffic problem is well handled by Mickey in this humorous release. Walt Disney has gathered a score of new and novel gags that are sure-fire laugh-getters. Mickey starts out as a taxi driver but finds travel somewhat difficult with a large hog as his fare. The action is fast and the synchrony and effects well done."

== Theatrical release ==
Traffic Troubles was Disney's first cartoon to be featured at New York's Roxy Theatre.

Poster of 1965

== Home media ==
The short was released on December 7, 2004 on Walt Disney Treasures: Mickey Mouse in Black and White, Volume Two: 1929-1935.

== Television ==
The short was included in the TV shows The Mickey Mouse Club (season 1, episode 83) and Mickey's Mouse Tracks (season 1, episode 73).

== See also ==
- Mickey Mouse (film series)
