= Mickey Mouse and Donald Duck Cartoon Collections =

Series of Disney videos

The Mickey Mouse and Donald Duck Cartoon Collections was a series of Disney videos compiling cartoon shorts produced between 1936 and 1954. It was a Disney attempt at releasing its stable of cartoon shorts to video under their own label, after their DiscoVision experiment. The discs were released in 1981 and 1982, two years before Disney unveiled The Disney Channel and two years also before they released Walt Disney Cartoon Classics.

There were three videos released in all, each with six shorts. Each of the six shorts presented included two cartoons each starring Mickey Mouse, two each starring Pluto and two each starring Donald Duck. There were no cartoons that starred Goofy (the only time Goofy appeared in a cartoon was if he costarred alongside Mickey and/or Donald). Other patterns seemed to include at least one 1930s Mickey short each and one short each placing Donald opposite Chip 'n' Dale. Many of the presented shorts were reissued on later Disney releases on video and DVD.

Outside the United States, a similar line titled Cartoon Festival was released in Europe, Australia and Japan.

== Featured videos ==
=== Volume One ===
The Laserdisc version of Volume 1 also includes the shorts that were on the VHS and beta version of Volume 2.

- Thru the Mirror (1936)
- The Sleepwalker (1942)
- Donald's Golf Game (1938) (reissued on "Walt Disney Cartoon Classics: The Goofy World of Sports" in 1992)
- The Whalers (1938)
- Pluto and the Gopher (1950)
- Dragon Around (1954) (reissued on "Walt Disney Cartoon Classics: Starring Chip 'n' Dale" in 1987)

=== Volume Two (VHS and Beta) ===
- Society Dog Show (1939) (reissued on "Walt Disney Cartoon Classics: Starring Pluto and Fifi" in 1987)
- Pluto's Sweater (1949)
- Donald Applecore (1952) (reissued on "Walt Disney Cartoon Classics: Starring Chip 'n' Dale" in 1987)
- The Little Whirlwind (1941) (reissued on "Walt Disney Cartoon Classics: Starring Mickey and Minnie" in 1987)
- Pluto's Blue Note (1947) (reissued on "Walt Disney Cartoon Classics: Starring Pluto and Fifi" in 1987)
- Donald's Diary (1954) (reissued on "Walt Disney Cartoon Classics: Starring Donald and Daisy" in 1987)

=== Volume Two (Laserdisc) ===
- Canine Caddy (1941)
- Bubble Bee (1949)
- Goofy and Wilbur (1939)
- Dude Duck (1951)
- Mickey's Trailer (1938)
- Hawaiian Holiday (1937)
- Donald's Happy Birthday (1949)
- Good Scouts (1938)
- Donald's Fountain of Youth (1953)
- Soup's On (1948)
- Lucky Number (1951)

=== Volume Three ===
- Boat Builders (1938) (Reissued on "Walt Disney Cartoon Classics: Mickey and the Gang" in 1989)
- Pluto's Quin-puplets (1937) (reissued on "Walt Disney Cartoon Classics: Starring Pluto and Fifi" in 1987)
- Chef Donald (1941)
- Moose Hunters (1937) (reissued on "Walt Disney Cartoon Classics: Mickey and the Gang" in 1989)
- Lend a Paw (1941)
- Working For Peanuts (1953) (reissued on "Walt Disney Cartoon Classics: Starring Chip 'n' Dale" in 1987)
