= Pluto (film series) =

- Introductory title of the Pluto short films.
- Production company: Walt Disney Productions
- Distributed by: RKO Radio Pictures (Note: Distributed by Buena Vista Distribution in reissues of the short films.)
- Country: United States
- Language: English

Pluto is a series of American animated comedy short films produced by Walt Disney Productions. The series started in 1937 with Pluto's Quin-puplets and ended in 1951 with Cold Turkey. The series stars the titular character Pluto, introduced in the Mickey Mouse film series as Mickey's pet dog, in addition to having recurring appearances by previously known characters such as Minnie Mouse, Figaro the Kitten, and Mickey Mouse, and also introduced well-known characters such as the chipmunk duo Chip 'n' Dale.

== Production ==
The short films were produced by Walt Disney Productions, and distributed by RKO Radio Pictures (later shorts being distributed by Buena Vista Distribution in re-releases). Like other Disney animated shorts in the golden age of American animation, the shorts begin with a starburst with a close-up of the star character's face (in this case Pluto), followed by the title "A Walt Disney Pluto".

Most of the shorts were directed by Charles Nichols. Another director of a considerable number of shorts in the series was Clyde Geronimi.

Pluto being a dog and most of the supporting characters also being animals without dialogue, the plot of most shorts is understood through their expressions, gestures, and actions. This made Pluto short films pioneering cartoons in animation, counting on characters who express personality through physical actions rather than dialogue.

== List of films ==
The following is a list of Pluto short films.

This list does not include shorts from other series in which Pluto appears, such as those from the Mickey Mouse series, the Donald Duck series, or other Disney short films that are not part of the Pluto series, nor shorts of Pluto made as part of the episodes of the television series Mickey Mouse Works.

=== 1937 ===
#	Title	Director	Release
1	Pluto's Quin-puplets	Ben Sharpsteen	November 26, 1937
Pluto and Fifi are the parents of five puppies. When they see a man with some sausages on the street, Fifi goes for them, forcefully leaving Pluto in the care of his children. But the puppies escape from the dog house and begin to follow a caterpillar in the garden, until they end up falling into the basement, where they activate the hose of an air compressor, at which they begin to bark, drawing the attention of their father, who tries to stop the hose, but ends up on the ground and causing a liquor bottle to spill into his mouth. As the pups try to stop the hose, they and Pluto end up covered in paint. When Fifi arrives, she is angry to see the puppies painted and a drunken Pluto. As a result, she isolates herself from her family, with Pluto and the puppies being forced to spend the night in a nearby barrel. Other appearances: Fifi the Peke, Pluto's Quin-puplets Notes: Introduced as a "Pluto the Pup" short.

=== 1940 ===
#	Title	Director	Release
2	Bone Trouble	Jack Kinney	June 28, 1940
Running out of food, Pluto tries to steal the bone from his neighbor, Butch the Bulldog. Other appearances: Butch the Bulldog (debut)
3	Pantry Pirate	Clyde Geronimi	December 27, 1940
Mammy Two Shoes punishes Pluto in the garden for eating the food from the pantry. But when Mammy cooks a roast ham, Pluto sneaks into the house to eat it, trying not to be found out by Mammy. Pluto tries to reach the ham by climbing on an ironing board, but has trouble keeping his balance. He ends up falling, and slides until he crashes into the bucket and mop soap, causing him to constantly sneeze bubbles. His sneezing ends up causing him to drop several cups on the ground, which gets Mammy's attention, but Pluto flees into the garden, clearing him of suspicion. Other appearances: Mammy Two Shoes

=== 1941 ===
#	Title	Director	Release
4	Pluto's Playmate	Norm Ferguson	January 24, 1941
While Pluto is playing on the beach with his ball, his toy ends up in the hands of a seal. While the seal plays with the ball, Pluto tries to get it back. He also tries to bury it so he doesn't take it away, but the seal retrieves it again. As the seal ends up swimming away with the ball, Pluto starts diving to get closer and retrieve the toy from him, ending up having trouble with an octopus along the way. When the seal sees the situation, he tries to help Pluto, until finally they are both pushed ashore, where Pluto is knocked unconscious. The seal revives him, and when he wakes up he returns the ball to the seal. Happily, Pluto and the seal end up playing with the ball together. Other appearances: Salty the Seal, Octopus

=== 1942 ===
#	Title	Director	Release
5	Pluto Junior	Clyde Geronimi	February 28, 1942
Pluto Junior, Pluto's son, plays with a ball and ends up waking up his father, who scolds him. Later, Pluto Junior finds a balloon, which he also begins to play with, and with which he also ends up waking up his father. After that, Pluto Junior runs into a caterpillar, which he begins to chase through the garden, until they both climb a tree. There, a bird tries to eat the caterpillar, and mistaking Pluto Junior's tail for the caterpillar, the pup begins to chase it, ending up both flying away while the dog is attached to the bird. Pluto Junior ends up falling into a sock on the hanging laundry, and when he can't get down, he begins to bark for help from his father, who has trouble reaching him. When he manages to get to his son, they both end up falling into the laundry bucket, and Pluto ends up happily kissing his son. Other appearances: Pluto Junior, Caterpillar, Bird
6	The Army Mascot	Clyde Geronimi	May 22, 1942
Seeing how well the army mascots are fed at a camp, Pluto poses as Gunther, a goat, to get food while he sleeps. To his surprise, Gunther's food ends up being a bunch of cans. Gunther chases after Pluto and ends up teaching him a lesson. Later, seeing how the soldiers applaud Gunther's ability to chew tobacco, Pluto does the same to win their affection, but Gunther ends up giving Pluto a push, causing him to swallow the entire tobacco, and begins to feel sick. As Pluto ends up unconscious, Gunther tries to push him into an explosive warehouse, but when he runs for it, he misses on the spot and ends up blowing himself up in the warehouse. After that, Pluto ends up well fed as a new mascot in the army. Other appearances: Gunther Goat, Butch the Bulldog (as "Winston"), Pancho the Chihuahua
7	The Sleepwalker	Clyde Geronimi	July 3, 1942
Sleepwalking, Pluto brings his bone to Dinah the Dachshund. And every time he wakes up, he thinks that Dinah has stolen his bone. Other appearances: Dinah the Dachshund (debut as a prototype of the character)
8	T-Bone for Two	Clyde Geronimi	August 14, 1942
Searching for food, Pluto finds a bone, but runs into Butch, who also wants the bone, causing Pluto to run away. As Butch enjoys the bone, Pluto begins to dig a huge bone-shaped hole near it, prompting Butch to push him aside to find the supposedly giant bone buried there. Pluto seizes the moment to get the bone, but when Butch realizes the deception, he begins to chase Pluto, until the latter hides in a junkyard. There, Pluto finds a horn, in which his bone ends up stuck and tries to get it out. When he does, Butch appears, who steals the bone, so Pluto uses the horn to distract Butch and get the bone back. Other appearances: Butch the Bulldog
9	Pluto at the Zoo	Clyde Geronimi	November 20, 1942
Pluto walks down the street with a small bone in his mouth, until he passes by the zoo and sees a huge bone in a lion's cage. Pluto spits the small bone into a garbage can, and while the lion sleeps, Pluto takes the bone from him, but has a hard time getting it out through the bars of the cage. Trying not to wake the lion, Pluto digs a tunnel to another area, and when he goes back to take the bone, the lion has woken up. Pluto grabs the bone and narrowly avoids an attack from the enraged lion. Pluto ends up in a kangaroo cage, where her son has taken Pluto's bone and put it in his mother's bag. Retrieving it, Pluto wakes up the kangaroo, who kicks him out, ending up in the gorilla's cage. Pluto faints at the sight of the gorilla, who amuses himself by moving Pluto while he is unconscious. When Pluto gets out of the cage, he ends up in the crocodile area, and runs away at full speed, past several animals, until he ends up back in the lion's cage, who recovers his bone while Pluto escapes. On the street, Pluto retrieves the small bone from the can, and happily leaves with it. Other appearances: Lion, Kangaroo, Joey, Crocodile, Gorilla

=== 1943 ===
#	Title	Director	Release
10	Private Pluto	Clyde Geronimi	April 2, 1943
While Pluto stands guard at the military camp, he discovers two chipmunks stockpiling acorns in a cannon. Other appearances: Chip 'n' Dale (debut as a prototype of the characters), Pete (voice)

=== 1944 ===
#	Title	Director	Release
11	Springtime for Pluto	Charles Nichols	June 23, 1944
When spring comes, Pluto enjoys observing the flora and fauna. Other appearances: The Spirit of Spring, Caterpillar/Butterfly
12	First Aiders	Charles Nichols	September 22, 1944
Reading a first aid book, Minnie practices bandaging. Asking Pluto and Figaro if either of them would like to help her, they are both willing to do so, but Pluto pushes Figaro away, and Minnie ends up asking the dog to hold the bandages for her. Figaro tries to bring the bandages to help as well, but Pluto pushes him away again. After practicing massages with Pluto, Minnie practices bandaging sprains with him, and the dog ends up bandaged and unable to move. As Minnie runs out of the house to get more bandages, Figaro takes the opportunity to annoy Pluto by not being able to move, taunting him in various ways. Later, getting loose, Pluto begins to chase Figaro around the house, until Pluto takes him down the stairs, really needing first aid from Minnie. Figaro laughs, but ends up falling down the stairs as well. Eventually, Minnie gets the two to stop fighting and make up. Other appearances: Minnie Mouse, Figaro

=== 1945 ===
#	Title	Director	Release
13	Dog Watch	Charles Nichols	March 16, 1945
Pluto is the watchdog on a ship, where the captain orders him to make sure there are no stowaways on board. After patrolling the deck, a rat boards the ship, and although Pluto tries to intimidate it, the rat turns out to be quite ferocious and has no problem taking on Pluto. The rat wanders around the ship while Pluto follows, until he finds the officers' mess, where he eats various foods, and though Pluto tries to shoo him away, the rat distracts him with food, tempting Pluto to eat as well. When the captain arrives and discovers Pluto, he thinks that the dog has eaten all the food, and punishes him in the brig. The rat walks away victorious, but leaning out of the hatch, Pluto moves the rope he is walking on, causing the rat to fall into the water and Pluto ends up laughing. Other appearances: Rat, Captain
14	Canine Casanova	Charles Nichols	July 27, 1945
Pluto crosses paths with Dinah, and falls in love at first sight with her. Pluto keeps trying to woo her in various ways, albeit to no avail. Finally, Dinah loses her patience and scolds Pluto, who leaves depressed, but when he gets separated from her, Dinah ends up being captured by the dog catcher. Pluto goes to rescue her from the dog pound, and take advantage of the fact that the dog catcher is asleep to rescue her, trying not to make noise when they pass in front of the dog catcher. But once they have managed to get out, the dog catcher's shotgun falls to the ground, waking him up, and he begins to chase both dogs in his van, until his tires end up flat. As a thank you, Dinah kisses Pluto and he walks her to her house, Pluto being happy until he discovers that Dinah is the mother of several puppies. Other appearances: Dinah the Dachshund (character's debut with her permanent appearance), Dog Catcher; cameo of Butch the Bulldog
15	The Legend of Coyote Rock	Charles Nichols	August 24, 1945
A narrator tells a story about a coyote, Bent-Tail, who loved mutton chops. In a nearby flock watched over by Pluto, a lamb, Negrito, tried to leave, but Pluto made him turn around because of the danger of the coyote. Subsequently, Bent-Tail arrived, causing Pluto to chase him, until Pluto was away from the flock, allowing Bent-Tail to lead the lambs to his den. When Negrito is left out, Bent-Tail begins to chase him, bumping into Pluto on the way, who begins to chase Bent-Tail, until he falls down a rocky ravine, later forming a coyote-shaped rock. Pluto manages to save the flock, and makes the lambs return, now safe from the coyote. Other appearances: Bent-Tail the Coyote (debut), Blackie (debut), Narrator (voice)
16	Canine Patrol	Charles Nichols	December 7, 1945
While Pluto patrols the beach to keep everything in order, he finds an egg from which a small turtle hatches. The turtle wants to go swimming in an area where swimming is prohibited, so Pluto takes it off the beach. Even so, the turtle insists on going swimming, but Pluto tricks it into walking off the beach. When the turtle realizes this, it tries to infiltrate again, having to deal with Pluto again, until it manages to give the dog the slip and ends up going swimming. When Pluto finds the turtle, he takes it back, inadvertently walking into a quicksand area. Going under, the turtle tries to save Pluto. Grateful to the turtle, Pluto ends up letting it swim under his supervision. Other appearances: Turtle (debut)

=== 1946 ===
#	Title	Director	Release
17	Pluto's Kid Brother	Charles Nichols	April 12, 1946
Pluto sleeps peacefully until his little brother, K.B., wakes him up by making a racket in a chicken coop and is chased by a rooster. Pluto drives the rooster out and then scolds his brother, ordering him to be quiet. However, K.B. runs away and ends up in a garbage can, where he finds a cat that ends up chasing him. Pluto confronts the cat, but the cat turns out to be tougher than Pluto and ends up going after the dog. Meanwhile, K.B. he sees Butch walking down the street and follows him. When wanting to get the products of a butcher shop, and seeing that K.B. is just the right size to fit through the mail slot, Butch proposes to the pup to go into the butcher shop to get food. K.B. gets some sausages, but Butch wants them for himself and confronts the young dog. Seeing him, Pluto confronts Butch, who ends up pushing Pluto aside and causing the store's alarm to go off. The dogman chases after them, until he ends up catching Butch. Pluto scolds K.B. and makes him go home without trying the sausages, which were left on the floor. But a while later, both brothers return to get the sausages. Other appearances: K.B., Butch the Bulldog, Lucifer the Tough Cat
18	In Dutch	Charles Nichols	May 10, 1946
Pluto distributes jugs of milk in a Dutch town. Arriving at Dinah's home, who was waiting impatiently for him, Pluto breaks her drinking bowl. Pluto pours the milk on some tulips for Dinah to drink from. Dinah jumps for joy, instantly tripping over the rope that rings the bell that serves as the dam's alarm. The mayor and the other townspeople accuse the dogs of setting off a false alarm, and drive them out of town. As they sadly walk away, they see that the dam actually has a leak, and while Dinah stays behind to plug it up, Pluto runs to ring the bell. The townsfolk scold him thinking it's another false alarm, so Pluto starts pestering the different townspeople into chasing him. Once they reach the dam, they see that the dogs have saved them, and allow them to return to the town. And at the end, Pluto returns to deliver the milk with Dinah next to him. Other appearances: Dinah the Dachshund, Mayor
19	The Purloined Pup	Charles Nichols	July 19, 1946
Ronnie, a St. Bernard puppy, has been kidnapped by Butch, and Pluto, who is a rookie police dog, is assigned to rescue him. While tracking it, Pluto finds Butch's lair, who is keeping watch at the entrance. In order not to be seen, Pluto dives down the moat around the lair, managing to enter through the window, but Butch also enters at that moment, so Pluto tries not to be discovered. Pluto goes looking for Ronnie, who is tied up in a room, making sure Butch doesn't see him. Upon releasing him, Ronnie barks with delight, which gets Butch's attention, so Pluto and Ronnie run out into the street. Butch chases them through a construction zone, having some mishaps with the plumbing in the place. Finally, Pluto manages to trap Butch in a straitjacket, and he and Ronnie take him away, proud of their victory. Other appearances: Butch the Bulldog, Ronnie the St. Bernard

=== 1947 ===
#	Title	Director	Release
20	Pluto's Housewarming	Charles Nichols	February 21, 1947
Pluto leaves his disastrous dog house to move with his collection of bones to a more luxurious one. While he is away for a moment, he discovers a small turtle taking a bone and its bowl to eat, so he stops it and leads it away. Afterwards, the turtle returns, so Pluto locks it in a box. Even so, the turtle returns, so Pluto throws it out again, but when he returns he discovers that Butch has taken over his house. Both dogs fight, until Butch ends up kicking Pluto out, who takes refuge in his old house. Butch returns to the fancy house, where he runs into the turtle, who starts fighting with Butch, until the turtle ends up victorious. Eventually, Pluto ends up allowing the turtle to live with him. Other appearances: Butch the Bulldog, Turtle (second appearance)
21	Rescue Dog	Charles Nichols	March 21, 1947
Pluto is a rescue dog in the mountains, and while on patrol, the barrel of his collar falls into the water of a frozen lake. When going to retrieve it, a seal comes out of the water, which begins to play with the barrel. Pluto takes it from him, but the seal wants to continue playing. As he leaves, the seal follows him without seeing him, causing Pluto to be distracted by hearing his footsteps and leave the barrel on the ground, so the seal takes the opportunity to take it away. Pluto chases the seal into a cave where the floor is slippery with ice. When they go outside again, Pluto slips and falls into the frozen lake, unable to get out because of the ice that covers it, so the seal goes to rescue him. The seal manages to open a hole in the ice and dives to rescue Pluto, getting him out, and making him drink from the barrel to regain consciousness. Grateful, Pluto shares his necklace with the seal, who ends up hugging him. Other appearances: Salty the Seal
22	Mail Dog	Charles Nichols	November 14, 1947
A plane drops a bag of mail that needs to be delivered, and Pluto goes in search of it. Finding it next to a totem pole, he is startled by the carved face, but manages to pick up the bag. As he walks, he runs into an extremely cold rabbit, which hugs Pluto to keep warm, but Pluto pushes it away. In anger, the rabbit punches Pluto, who begins to chase him, until the rabbit returns to Pluto's sleigh, where it warms itself with the blanket on it. Pluto returns, and upon meeting the rabbit, begins to chase him on the sleigh. They both end up slipping, until they finally reach the plane where Pluto was supposed to deliver the bag. The pilot thanks him, and being happy, Pluto forgets his grudges with the rabbit, allowing him to warm himself with his blanket while he takes him on the sleigh. Other appearances: Flutter Foot the Rabbit
23	Pluto's Blue Note	Charles Nichols	December 26, 1947
Pluto tries to sing imitating other animals, but he's always out of tune. Other appearances: Birds, Spike the Bee, Grasshopper, Seller; cameos of Fifi the Peke and Dinah the Dachshund Notes: Nominated for Academy Award for Best Animated Short Film.

=== 1948 ===
#	Title	Director	Release
24	Bone Bandit	Charles Nichols	April 30, 1948
Having no food, Pluto goes to look for a bone that he buried, finding a gopher in the area, which collects the flowers he finds. Mistaking Pluto's tail for a stalk, the gopher flees, and Pluto tries to trap him inside the tunnel, where he ends up getting a bone, which, along with other buried bones, the gopher uses as a load-bearing wall for his tunnels. The gopher tries to retrieve the bone, but Pluto stops him, so the gopher uses a flower to make Pluto sneeze with the pollen. After returning to a chase, after running the gopher gets into his tunnel, and when Pluto jumps to capture him, due to the instability of the tunnels he ends up collapsing the gopher's lair, who makes Pluto sneeze again with a flower, causing a bigger hole. Finally, Pluto retrieves the bone from him, and the gopher ends up sneezing from the pollen from the flowers as well. Other appearances: Gopher
25	Pluto's Purchase	Charles Nichols	July 9, 1948
Mickey orders Pluto to go to the butcher shop to buy a salami. Seeing him, Butch begins to follow him to snatch the salami. During the ride home, Pluto constantly tries to protect Butch's salami. Finally, Pluto returns home, happy that he and Mickey can finally eat the salami, but Mickey tells him that the salami is a present for someone. To Pluto's surprise, that someone turns out to be Butch, to whom Mickey gives the salami for his birthday. This situation causes Pluto to end up angry. Other appearances: Butch the Bulldog, Mickey Mouse; cameo of Dinah the Dachshund
26	Cat Nap Pluto	Charles Nichols	August 13, 1948
Pluto sleepily returns home, not paying much attention to Figaro when the cat comes to greet him. Pluto is constantly trying to sleep, his sleep being triggered by a tiny Sandman Pluto, but is awakened in various ways by Figaro. When he has had his fill, Pluto chases after him, but he is too tired to continue and goes to sleep. Again, Figaro tries to wake him up, but this time Pluto is fast asleep and doesn't wake up. Finally, a Sandman Figaro also appears, which causes Figaro to end up sleeping next to Pluto. Other appearances: Figaro, Sandman Pluto, Sandman Figaro
27	Pluto's Fledgling	Charles Nichols	September 10, 1948
Seeing other birds taking flight, a small bird tries to fly too, but ends up falling out of its nest, landing in Pluto's water bowl, who helps it out and saves it from drowning. Seeing the bird's nest in a tree, Pluto takes him back to his home. But the bird tries to fly again, falling again next to Pluto, who, seeing that the bird wants to learn to fly, decides to help him. Pluto makes the bird bite its tail while flapping its wings as he runs, but Pluto ends up tripping on a tire. It occurs to Pluto to use the rubber band to catapult the bird, but it is Pluto who ends up being catapulted while the bird is attached to its tail, flapping its wings to try to fly. In the end, when Pluto lands next to his kennel, he sees the bird finally fly away, happy for him. Other appearances: Orville the Bird

=== 1949 ===
#	Title	Director	Release
28	Pueblo Pluto	Charles Nichols	January 14, 1949
Mickey and Pluto arrive in Mexico, where while Mickey is visiting a store, Pluto is entertained by a bone, which catches the eye of Ronnie the Saint Bernard. Under the planks where Pluto is, Ronnie uses his tail to snatch the bone from him. Ronnie escapes, and ends up rolling in a basin as Pluto chases after him. The two end up in the desert, where thanks to his size Ronnie hides among some cacti, without Pluto having access to him. After climbing on a rock, Pluto enters the area where Ronnie is and retrieves the bone, but has trouble getting out due to the cacti. Pluto ends up depressed, so Ronnie goes looking for a bowl to roll over again and knock over some cacti, whereupon he clears a path for Pluto to escape. Grateful, Pluto gives Ronnie his bone and returns to Mickey, who has bought several cacti. Other appearances: Ronnie the St. Bernard (second and last appearance), Mickey Mouse
29	Pluto's Surprise Package	Charles Nichols	March 4, 1949
After receiving the mail, Pluto discovers a small turtle inside a package, which tries to leave, but Pluto tries to get it to return to the package to take it home with the rest of the mail. The turtle constantly sneaks off to go swimming, with Pluto having to go after her. Finally, after several chases, the turtle agrees to go with Pluto, the turtle carrying the mail in its mouth, while Pluto carries the turtle home. Other appearances: Turtle (third and last appearance)
30	Pluto's Sweater	Charles Nichols	April 29, 1949
Minnie has knitted a sweater for Pluto, who hides because he doesn't want to wear it, but Minnie finds him and makes him put it on, whereupon Figaro laughs at Pluto. Seeing himself in the mirror for his horror, Pluto wants to go back into hiding, but Minnie makes him go outside, where Butch and the other dogs laugh at Pluto, who leaves in embarrassment. Left alone, Pluto tries to remove the sweater, but it ends up getting tangled in his body. After several attempts to get it off, Pluto entangles himself on a branch and struggles to remove his sweater, but falls into the lake, causing the sweater to shrink, and Pluto wears it on his face like a mask. Returning home, he scares Minnie and Figaro due to his face covered by the sweater, but Minnie realizes that it is Pluto, and cries when she sees her sweater for Pluto has shrunk. However, she sees that it is now the perfect size for Figaro, whom she places the sweater on, much to Pluto's delight, and Figaro's anger. Other appearances: Minnie Mouse, Figaro; cameo of Butch the Bulldog
31	Bubble Bee	Charles Nichols	June 24, 1949
Pluto plays with his ball in the park, until he gets distracted by a gumball machine. After seeing Spike the Bee get a gumball, he follows him to his hive, where he discovers that he keeps several gumballs, which he ends up chewing, and blows a bubblegum balloon that he plays with as if it were a ball. When Spike returns home and sees the destroyed hive, he finds out that Pluto is the culprit, and goes to him to scold him, but Pluto barks at him in response, blowing a huge bubble Spike which Spike gets stuck to. Spike manages to entangle Pluto with the gum, and tries to sting him with his stinger, causing Pluto to run away. Pluto ends up accidentally swallowing Spike, but makes a giant bubblegum balloon with Spike inside, who manages to escape when the balloon explodes, eventually managing to sting Pluto, who runs away in pain. Other appearances: Spike the Bee
32	Sheep Dog	Charles Nichols	November 4, 1949
Pluto tends to a flock of lambs, which Bent-Tail plans to take away with his son's help while Pluto sleeps. Using cotton, Bent-Tail disguises his son as a lamb in order to infiltrate them and take one, but the lamb escapes. Angry, Ben-Tail tries to hit his son, but misses and sets off the alarm, waking up Pluto, who howls at the coyotes. Before they return, Pluto uses the cotton to disguise himself as a sheep and trick them, which he succeeds by being the one the coyotes lead out of the herd while pretending to be asleep. At that moment, Pluto begins to chase Bent-Tail, while his son returns to where the lambs are. After being chased by Pluto, Bent-Tail finally manages to take a lamb to his cave, but is disheartened to see that it is his son disguised. Other appearances: Bent-Tail the Coyote, Bent-Tail Junior, Blackie (second and last appearance)

=== 1950 ===
#	Title	Director	Release
33	Pluto's Heart Throb	Charles Nichols	January 6, 1950
Pluto walks down the street, and Cupid (represented as a dog), makes him fall in love with Dinah, who pays no attention to him, but Cupid makes her fall in love with him too. Pluto is happy until Butch shows up, who also wants to woo Dinah. They both accompany Dinah to her house, where after taking advantage of Butch leaving, Pluto gives her a bone. They both go outside, but while Dinah is out, Pluto gets beaten up by Butch while Dinah hears the noise. Butch pretends to walk down the street, and Dinah warns him that someone is attacking Pluto. Butch pretends to revive him to her, but when Dinah isn't looking, Butch punches Pluto. In the end Dinah discovers him, and kicks him out. Reanimated, Pluto leaves to get the bone, but Butch returns, and seeing Pluto together breaks his heart. Dinah tries to get away from Butch, until she falls into the pool, and while Butch can't bring himself to go in the water, Pluto ends up saving her. Butch leaves in shame, while Pluto and Dinah end up together happily. Other appearances: Dinah the Dachshund, Butch the Bulldog, Cupid
34	Pluto and the Gopher	Charles Nichols	February 10, 1950
Pluto discovers a gopher eating the flowers in Minnie's garden, and tries to catch it, while the gopher taunts him. As he chases after him, he smashes some flowers, for which Minnie scolds him. Minnie keeps a pot with a flower inside the house, in which the gopher was, who after confusing a green carpet with the grass in the garden, begins to make tunnels in it. Soon Pluto discovers him, and chases the gopher around the house. The gopher hides in different ways, but Pluto always has him cornered. After the chase, the gopher finally returns to the garden, where he goes back to digging tunnels. Pluto tries to catch him, but the gopher tangles his ears in the tunnels, trapping Pluto as the gopher continues to eat flowers. Other appearances: Gopher, Minnie Mouse
35	Wonder Dog	Charles Nichols	April 7, 1950
Pluto discovers that Dinah is a fan of Prince the Wonder Dog, who is the star of a circus. To be like him, Pluto imagines the scrapyard as a circus where he begins to juggle. He is watched by Butch, who laughs at Pluto's clumsiness. With Butch locked up, Pluto taunts him, but Butch escapes and chases after Pluto, who immediately ends up doing different kinds of mischief which impresses Dinah, who watches him outside the junkyard. In the end, Pluto ends up falling into the fence where Prince's sign is, with his face sticking out where Prince's was, while Dinah glares at him, with Pluto happy about it. Other appearances: Dinah the Dachshund, Butch the Bulldog, Prince the Wonder Dog (on a poster)
36	Primitive Pluto	Charles Nichols	May 19, 1950
Pluto is comfortably in a cabin in the woods, where his primitive instinct appears to him, represented as a miniature wolf, which, seeing that Pluto is too comfortable, convinces him to go hunting for his own food. In the forest, searching and tracking food, the wolf constantly scolds him for not doing things properly. Finally, after having problems with a rabbit, and running into a bear, Pluto runs home, where he discovers the wolf eating the food he had in his bowl, so he begins to chase him furiously, refusing to listen to his primitive instinct anymore. Other appearances: Primo the Wolf
37	Puss Cafe	Charles Nichols	June 9, 1950
Milton the Cat goes in search of his friend Richard to take him to a house where there are some bottles of milk at the door, and some appetizing birds flying and fish in the garden pond. When Pluto catches them drinking the milk, the cats run away, but as Pluto goes to his hammock, the cats go back into the garden to trap the birds in the tree house, but they fall on top of Pluto, and they run away again. Not wanting to have any more trouble, they use the hammock to catapult Pluto out of the garden, seizing the moment to catch the fish in the pond. However, Pluto returns and the cats run away again, this time chasing them through the city, until they lead him to a huge cat that ends up scaring Pluto. Other appearances: Milton the Cat (debut), Richard the Cat
38	Pests of the West	Charles Nichols	July 21, 1950
Bent-Tail intends to capture the chickens on a farm with the help of his son, whom he orders to get into the chicken coop, but instead of fulfilling his mission, he ends up sleeping in a nest. Faced with such a situation, Bent-Tail breaks into the chicken coop and captures the chickens himself, but the scandal awakens Pluto, who barks ferociously at the coyotes. Pluto returns to his dog house to sleep, not realizing that the coyotes are hiding on the roof, trying not to make any noise. But in the end, Bent-Tail ends up sneezing and wakes up Pluto, who starts chasing him. After an attempt to catch Bent-Tail, Plutp discovers the coyotes trying to take a chicken from her nest, continually trying to return it to the coop, while coyotes take it from him all the time. Finally, after the commotion, Bent-Tail manages to take the nest, but ends up realizing that the hen is not on top but his own son, who tries to cheer up his father by showing that he has got an egg, which Bent-Tail breaks furiously over the head of his son. Other appearances: Bent-Tail the Coyote, Bent-Tail Junior
39	Food for Feudin'	Charles Nichols	August 11, 1950
Chip and Dale fill their tree with acorns, but when Pluto sees that the tree is a good place to hide his bone, the pressure causes the acorns to fall out, causing both Pluto and the chipmunks to fall down the hill. With the acorns inside Pluto's dog house, the chipmunks try to get them back. Chip and Dale hide inside two gloves to avoid discovery, as well as trying to distract Pluto thanks to it. After starting to play with a ball, and Pluto ends up tied to his house, they carry the ball to their tree for Pluto to follow and drag the dog house behind him. Thanks to this, they move the acorns from Pluto's house to the tree. Pluto discovers them, but the chipmunks tangle his paws with the gloves, trapping him. Mimicking the situation, they end up entangling their own hands, which makes the three of them end up laughing. Other appearances: Chip 'n' Dale
40	Camp Dog	Charles Nichols	September 22, 1950
While howling at the moon, Bent-Tail and his son smell food hanging from a tree next to a campsite. Taking advantage of the fact that the owner is not there, they try to catch it, but Bent-Tail is scared away by Pluto, who was inside the tent. When he goes back inside the store, Bent-Tail tries again to get the food, but his son drags Pluto out of the store while he is asleep, thinking he is edible. Bent-Tail quickly returns him to the tent, and again tries to get the food down from the tree, which ends up falling to the ground. As Bent-Tail picks the food up, his son continues to get Pluto out of the tent, until he finally wakes up. The coyotes pretend to be asleep inside the tent, so Pluto tries to let them sleep peacefully, but they go off to get the food again, while they lock Pluto in the tent. In the end, Pluto escapes, but falls into the river, so the coyotes take advantage of the moment to eat by setting up a picnic. Pluto returns and scares them away, but seeing the owner return, Pluto runs away so they wouldn't think he was going to eat the picnic food himself, and ends up joining the coyotes in howling at the moon. Other appearances: Bent-Tail the Coyote, Bent-Tail Junior

=== 1951 ===
#	Title	Director	Release
41	Cold Storage	Charles Nichols	February 9, 1951
A stork is getting cold during the winter, so it flies in search of shelter, until it finds the house of Pluto, who later returns full of cold. The stork takes Pluto out of the booth, and does not let him in, moving the booth continuously. Pluto begins to think that he is going crazy watching his kennel move, until he sees it walking on legs. Pluto tries to get the stork to come out, but instead he uses his long beak to eat his food out of the hut, and flies away. As the stork sleeps comfortably, Pluto kicks her out and takes back the kennel from him, but the stork kicks him out again. Continually, they both start fighting, kicking one out of the booth while the other goes back inside. Finally, the sun comes out and it starts to get hot, so now they both try to get out of the kennel, and while the stork does, it doesn't let Pluto out, so the dog starts to get hot. Fortunately, Pluto manages to move the house to the garden pond, being able to cool off thanks to the water. Other appearances: Fred Stork
42	Plutopia	Charles Nichols	May 18, 1951
Mickey and Pluto arrive at Camp Utopia where they stay in a cabin. According to the rules of the camp, however, Pluto must be tied up outside the cabin and wear a muzzle - which prevents him from eating his food. Adding to his frustration, Milton the Cat seizes the opportunity to take Pluto's food and eat it himself. During the night, Pluto dreams that he is in "Plutopia," a place where Milton (voiced by Jim Backus) is his butler, that he can easily spank Milton, and that Milton serves Pluto all kinds of food whenever his tail is bitten. When he wakes up, Mickey removes his muzzle. With the dream still in mind he bites Milton's tail, who then begins to fight with Pluto. Other appearances: Milton the Cat, Mickey Mouse
43	Cold Turkey	Charles Nichols	September 21, 1951
Pluto and Milton sleep while a wrestling show is on TV. Waking up, they see a succulent roast turkey on TV, and wanting to eat it, they try to see if there is any way to access it, until Pluto is electrocuted by the wiring. When it's time to eat, the food in their bowls isn't enough for them, so they search for food until they see cans in a cupboard. Pluto tries to use the garbage can to get Milton up, but accidentally ends up throwing him into the fridge, opening the door on impact. The two see a frozen turkey inside, and struggling to get it, Pluto locks Milton in the fridge, but Milton ends up running away and locking Pluto inside the fridge. Once he gets out, he goes looking for Milton, who hides with the turkey inside the television. Pluto turns on the light, causing Milton to come out due to the heat from the appliance, but he leaves the turkey inside, which ends up burning. In the end, they both end up wrestling just like in the wrestling show. Other appearances: Milton the Cat

== Home media ==
The films have been released in various forms of home media, with selected films released on VHS, laserdisc, and DVD. Starting in 2010, some of the cartoons were made available on the iTunes Store as digital downloads.

The only complete re-release of the entire series has been in the "Walt Disney Treasures" DVD sets in two two-disc sets: "The Complete Pluto" (2004) and "The Complete Pluto, Volume Two" (2006).

== Legacy ==
The television series Mickey Mouse Works (1999–2000), as well as its spin-off series House of Mouse (2001–2003), included several shorts starred by Pluto, mainly inspired by his classic short films, also including some of the shorts' recurring characters such as Butch the Bulldog and Dinah the Dachshund. These shorts also includes a series titled Pluto Gets the Paper, in which Pluto experiences all kinds of situations after Mickey sends him to pick up the newspaper in front of the house.

== See also ==
- Silly Symphony
  - Just Dogs
  - Mother Pluto
- Out of the Frying Pan and into the Firing Line
- Mickey Mouse (film series)
  - Pluto's Judgement Day
  - Donald and Pluto
  - Lend a Paw
  - Pluto's Party
  - Pluto's Christmas Tree
- Donald Duck (film series)
- Mickey Mouse Works
