= Mickey Mouse universe =

Fictional universe involving Mickey Mouse and related Disney characters

Mickey Mouse & Friends
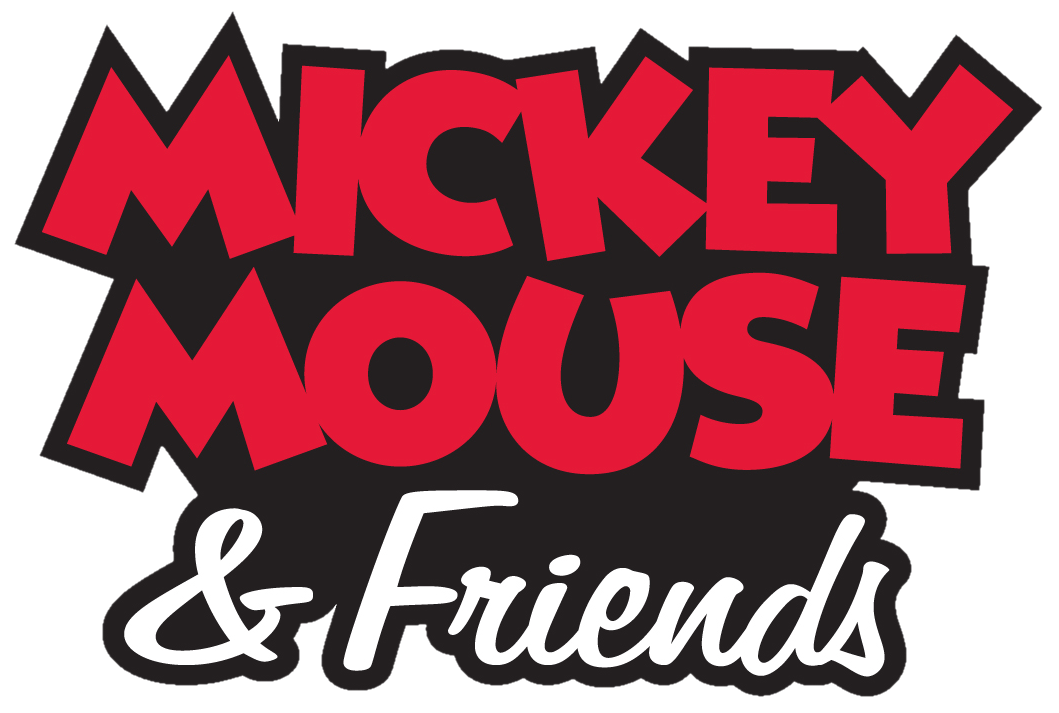
- The logo used by Disney to promote the Mickey Mouse & Friends franchise
- Created by: Walt Disney; Ub Iwerks; Floyd Gottfredson (expansion)
- Original work: Steamboat Willie (1928)
- Owner: The Walt Disney Company
- Years: 1928–present

Print publications
- Comics: Mickey Mouse in comic books
- Comic strip: Mickey Mouse in comic strips

Films and television
- Films: List of Mickey Mouse films and appearances
- Short film: Mickey Mouse film series (1928–1953)
- Animated series: Original shows: Mickey Mouse Works (1999–2000); House of Mouse (2001–2003); Mickey Mouse Clubhouse (2006–2016); Mickey Mouse (2013–2019); Mickey Mouse Mixed-Up Adventures (2017–2021); The Wonderful World of Mickey Mouse (2020–2023); Mickey Mouse Funhouse (2021–2025); Mickey Mouse Clubhouse+ (2025–present)

Games
- Video games: See list of Mickey Mouse films and appearances § Video games

Miscellaneous
- Theme park attraction: Mickey & Minnie's Runaway Railway (2020–present)
- Related universe: Donald Duck universe
- Due to the vast filmography of Mickey Mouse and related characters, this infobox does not exhaustively cover all works in this franchise.

The Mickey Mouse universe is a fictional shared universe which is the setting for stories involving Disney cartoon characters, including Mickey Mouse, Minnie Mouse, Donald Duck, Daisy Duck, Goofy, and Pluto as the primary members (colloquially known as the "Sensational Six"), and many other characters related to them, most of them being anthropomorphic animals. The universe originated from the Mickey Mouse animated short films produced by Disney starting in 1928, although its first consistent version was created by Floyd Gottfredson in the Mickey Mouse newspaper comic strip. Real-world versions also exist in Disneyland and Tokyo Disneyland, called Mickey's Toontown. The term "Mickey Mouse universe" is not officially used by The Walt Disney Company, but it has been used by Disney comics author and animation historian David Gerstein. The Walt Disney Company typically uses terms such as Mickey & Friends or Mickey & the Gang to refer to the character franchise.

Since 1990, the city in which Mickey lives is typically called Mouseton in American comics. In modern continuity, Mouseton is often depicted as being located in the fictional U.S. state of Calisota, analogous to Northern California. This fictional state was invented by comics writer Carl Barks in 1952 as the location for Donald Duck's home city, Duckburg.

The most consistent aspect of the Mickey Mouse universe is the characters. The most well-known include Mickey's girlfriend Minnie, pet dog Pluto, friends Donald, Goofy, Horace Horsecollar, Clarabelle Cow, and nemesis Pete. Some Disney productions incorporate characters from Disney's animated feature films, such as Bath Day (1946), in which Figaro from Pinocchio appears as Minnie's cat (becoming her recurring pet in several productions), Mickey's Christmas Carol (1983), and – most extensively – House of Mouse (2001–2003). Although crossovers between the Mickey Mouse and Donald Duck universes have been infrequent, the two universes overlap. Characters from the Donald Duck universe make occasional appearances in the Mickey Mouse universe and vice versa. It is the second highest-grossing media franchise of all time.

== Continuity development ==
The Mickey Mouse universe essentially originated with the debut of Mickey himself in Plane Crazy (1928). Although Mickey's stories included the character Pete, who was created in 1925, the world in which Mickey lives holds a continuity largely independent from earlier films. An exception to this was the reintroduction of Oswald the Lucky Rabbit in 2010 with the release of Epic Mickey.

In 1930, Disney began a Mickey Mouse comic strip, which greatly expanded Mickey's world. The stories then became a work of collaborative fiction with writers working in different media and different countries. This sometimes caused continuity discrepancies. For example, while Mickey and his friends largely live in the same contemporary setting, they sometimes appear in exotic settings, including period pieces (Brave Little Tailor, The Nifty Nineties) and fantasy films (Fantasia, Fun and Fancy Free).

The comics writers explained this discrepancy was to present the characters as "real" cartoon characters who are employed by Disney as actors. Walter J. Ong in his cultural research of Mickey Mouse and Americanism also agreed with this opinion. In short, characters are more human-like, featuring fewer animal features in their characteristics. This understanding of the characters leading separate lives was welcomed by Walt Disney. When asked whether or not Mickey and Minnie were married, Disney replied that the mice were indeed married in their "private lives", but that they sometimes appear as boyfriend and girlfriend for "screen purposes." Also, in the World War II propaganda film The New Spirit (1942), Donald Duck fills out his income tax and lists his occupation as "actor", and the film The Three Musketeers (2004) includes a DVD bonus feature of the characters reminiscing on their experience filming the feature film.

Animation historian David Gerstein has noted that, although the characters will appear in different settings and sometimes even change their names (Mickey's Christmas Carol), the characters are still themselves and behave in a way consistent with their natures.

Initially, Disney comics were produced in the United States. Over the years, demand for these comics eventually became so intense that stories were created in the United States exclusively for foreign consumption. Disney licensed its characters to foreign publishers. As a result, many Disney comics stories have been created by European or Latin American authors, resulting in more continuity discrepancies and local variations of the Mickey Mouse and Donald Duck universes. Some characters have become more popular abroad than in the United States, while some appeared and were used solely in foreign stories.

Generally, Mickey Mouse series films are for entertainment purposes. Unlike traditional stories like Aesop's Fables, Disney animation generally does not avoid adult or mature scenes. In Hawaiian Holiday (1937), Goofy was depicted in a grave in one scene, followed by a laugh scene. Its choice of scene creation can be seen as a signature of the attention to entertainment effort.

== Places ==
=== Mickey's farm ===
In Plane Crazy (1928), the first produced Mickey Mouse story, Mickey is seen at a farm. In his early films, Mickey is in a rural setting, but most commonly at a farm. This setting was succinctly presented in the first sentences of one of Mickey's first storybooks:

"This story is about Mickey Mouse who lives in a cozy nest under the floor of the old barn. And it is about his friend Minnie Mouse whose home is safely hidden, soft and warm, somewhere in the chicken house."

— The Adventures of Mickey Mouse: Book I (1931)

In the Mickey Mouse newspaper strip, Mickey's farm was most likely located in the midwestern United States, as indicated by characters' comments to have arrived "out west" to Death Valley and to go "back east" to conduct business, etc. This rural setting reflected Walt Disney's own childhood in Missouri and like Disney, Mickey eventually moved to the city, although he never forgets his roots. Mickey sometimes makes references to his life "back on the farm."

=== Mouseton ===
Mickey appeared in an urban setting as early as 1931 in the short film Traffic Troubles where he works as a taxi driver. Mickey's city was unnamed until 1932, when the comic story The Great Orphanage Robbery identified it as Silo Center. Some Floyd Gottfredson stories simply called the city Hometown while other Gottfredson stories used the name Mouseville. But the first consistent name for Mickey's city came in 1950s Italy, where it was called Topolinia (from Topolino or 'little mouse,' Mickey's Italian name).

In 1990, Disney Comics launched the new American comic Mickey Mouse Adventures and initially planned to use the name Mouseville there. But due to then-current Mighty Mouse cartoons' use of a city called Mouseville, the new name Mouseton was created for Mickey's town instead; both in Mickey Mouse Adventures and in Disney's contemporary reprints of vintage stories in Walt Disney's Comics and Stories (1991–93). Later publisher Gemstone and the present Boom Studios have continued the use of Mouseton from 2003 onward. In-between licensee Gladstone (1993–99) usually left Mickey's city unnamed, or—very rarely—referenced it as Duckburg, better known as Donald Duck's hometown.)

Mouseton's location in Calisota and its positioning with regard to Duckburg (the cities being not far from one another) were the subject of speculation early on, but have generally been treated consistently in American publications from 2003 onward.

In Disney comics published by Egmont (Scandinavia) and Abril (Brazil), Mickey lives in Duckburg—even though Mickey and Donald only rarely team up in shared comics adventures. The same tradition extends to Disney comics published in Germany by Egmont subdivision Ehapa (Duckburg is called Entenhausen in German), although the German comics have mentioned possible equivalents of Mouseton as neighboring towns or villages: Mausdorf (German for "mouse village") and Mäuslingen (German equivalent to "Mouseville").

In Germany, the Netherlands, Brazil and Scandinavia, local tradition has it that Mickey's hometown is simply a different district of Duckburg. In Disney theme parks, the Roger Rabbit-inspired Toontown, a district in Los Angeles specifically for cartoon characters, is presented as Mickey's home.

In animation, Mouseton is mentioned in the DuckTales reboot series, where one of the characters, Zan Owlson, graduated from Mouseton's School of Business, the place appearing briefly in the episode "The Ballad of Duke Baloney!" during Owlson's presentation.

=== Non-Mouseton continuity ===
In some 1920s and 1930s Disney press releases and magazines, Mickey was described as living in Hollywood—even though the rural setting of the actual cartoons and comics had little in common with the real Hollywood.

In the film Mr. Mouse Takes a Trip (1940) Mickey and Pluto live in the actual world city of Burbank, California, home of Walt Disney Studios.

The Walt Disney Parks and Resorts modeled Mickey's hometown and birthplace as Mickey's Toontown. Occasional modern animated projects reference Toontown as well.

In the TV series Goof Troop (1992–1993) Goofy and Pete live in the fictional town of Spoonerville. The town also appears in the 1993 video game of the same name and in the two films based on the series: A Goofy Movie (1995) and An Extremely Goofy Movie (2000). According to the map Goofy has in A Goofy Movie, the town is located in Ohio.

In the Kingdom Hearts series, both the Mouseton and Duckburg characters live in a realm called Disney Town, mainly inspired on Mickey's Toontown.

In the TV series Mickey Mouse Mixed-Up Adventures (2017-2021) and Mickey Mouse Funhouse (2021-2025), the characters live in the fictional town of Hot Dog Hills (whose name refers to Mickey's first spoken words in the 1929 short The Karnival Kid: "Hot Dogs!").

== Protagonists ==
=== Mickey Mouse ===
Mickey Mouse is an anthropomorphic mouse most often dressed in gloves, red shorts and yellow shoes. While typically given a modest and pleasant personality, he is often an enthusiastic and determined character, seeking new adventures, excitement and mysteries. He often serves as the de facto leader of his friends. He was introduced in the 1928 short film Steamboat Willie.

=== Minnie Mouse ===
Minnie Mouse is Mickey's female counterpart, an anthropomorphic mouse usually portrayed as his girlfriend who first appeared in the 1928 short film Steamboat Willie. Originally characterized as a flapper, Minnie has often played Mickey's damsel in distress. Her most frequent profession in early cartoons was a musician and songwriter.

=== Donald Duck ===
Donald Duck is Mickey's short tempered friend who was first introduced in the 1934 short film The Wise Little Hen. Donald is an anthropomorphic duck who gets angry when characters are mocking him. He dates Daisy Duck and is the uncle of Huey, Dewey, and Louie.

=== Daisy Duck ===
Daisy Duck is Donald's female counterpart, an anthropomorphic Duck usually portrayed as his girlfriend who first appeared in the 1940 short film Mr. Duck Steps Out. She sometimes gets upset with Donald when he loses his temper. Daisy has an equally dangerous temper but a much more sophisticated mien. She is also best friends with Minnie Mouse.

=== Goofy ===
Goofy is Mickey's clumsy, dim-witted and well-meaning friend who was first introduced in the 1932 short film Mickey's Revue. Goofy is an anthropomorphic dog who is accident-prone. In some stories he dates Clarabelle Cow while other times he is shown as a single parent, being the father of Max Goof. His original name was Dippy Dawg; later cartoons furing 1950s and 1960s sometimes gave him the full name George Geef, while in regular comic books, the television series Goof Troop, among other media his full name is Goofy Goof, and some modern comics also use Goofus D. Dawg.

=== Pluto ===
Pluto is Mickey Mouse's pet dog who was first introduced in the 1930 short film The Chain Gang, later appearing in The Picnic as Minnie's dog Rover and in the 1931 short film The Moose Hunt under his current role as Mickey's dog. Unlike the anthropomorphic Goofy, Pluto is a normal dog who walks on four legs and rarely speaks.

=== Chip 'n' Dale ===
Chip 'n' Dale are two anthropomorphic chipmunks who are often trouble-makers for Pluto and Donald. However, the chipmunks are often provoked, especially by Donald. In modern series, they are depicted as friends of Mickey.

=== Clarabelle Cow ===
Clarabelle Cow is a tall, anthropomorphic cow who is Minnie Mouse's friend and was introduced in the 1928 short film Steamboat Willie. She is prone to gossip and occasionally plays a well-meaning but ineffective parent figure to Donald Duck. She has been known to date both Horace Horsecollar and Goofy.

=== Horace Horsecollar ===
Horace Horsecollar is a tall, anthropomorphic horse who is Mickey Mouse's friend who first appeared in the 1929 short film The Plowboy. He is prone to bragging and practical joking. Before the appearance of Donald Duck and Goofy, Horace was Mickey Mouse's usual sidekick. He is often seen as the boyfriend of Clarabelle Cow.

== Family relations ==
=== Mickey Mouse's family ===
==== Felicity Fieldmouse ====
Felicity Fieldmouse (née Mouse) is Mickey's older sister and the mother of Mickey's twin nephews Morty and Ferdie. The character first appeared in Morty and Ferdie's 1932 comics debut: there, she looks old and is not stated to be Mickey's sister. Indeed, Mickey calls her "Mrs. Fieldmouse" as if she were an unrelated acquaintance, implying that Morty and Ferdie call Mickey "uncle" as a form of courtesy. Danish editor Egmont Publishing used the character again in seven stories published between 2000 and 2008, reimagining some aspects while refraining from declaring the old and the new character the same one. This new incarnation looks younger and is identified as Mickey's sister. She is now named Felicity, a name that was kept in the American localization of these Danish stories. In Egmont production notes her husband is named Frank Fieldmouse, though the character has never appeared in a story.

==== Morty and Ferdie Fieldmouse ====
Morty and Ferdie Fieldmouse

Mortimer "Morty" and Ferdinand "Ferdie" Fieldmouse are Mickey Mouse's twin nephews. They first appeared in Floyd Gottfredson's Mickey Mouse Sunday page storyline titled "Mickey's Nephews" (1932). Since then they have appeared in many comic strips and comic book stories starring Mickey Mouse and Pluto. Morty and Ferdy were first shown as wearing shirts, but no pants or underpants. Pants were later added to their wardrobe.

Ferdie disappeared from the Mickey Mouse comic strip in 1943 because Gottfredson thought the nephews were too much alike. He had plans to bring Ferdie back later as a bespectacled, intellectual, bookworm mouse with an Eton hat and coat with the explanation that he had been away at school. However, Gottfredson never got around to bringing Ferdie back and Morty remained in the strip alone. Morty was occasionally depicted with his best friend named Alvin and a sweetheart named Millie. Both were anthropomorphic dogs. Ferdie never vanished from comic book stories, however. In recent years, some of Morty and Ferdie's comic book appearances have portrayed them as (very talented) football players on the team Riverside Rovers. Their mother is depicted as a supportive "Soccer Mom." Morty & Ferdie are also occasionally pitted against their antagonists Melody, Minnie Mouse's niece and Pete's twin hellion nephews, Pierino & Pieretto. Morty should not be confused with Mickey Mouse's originally proposed name "Mortimer Mouse," or Mickey's ofttimes rival of the same name Mortimer Mouse, or Minnie's wealthy rancher Uncle Mortimer. Morty is a playable character on the PlayStation 2 game Disney Golf.

In pre-World War II children's books produced by Disney, the nephews were usually called Morty and Monty. Earlier books contain three or more nephews with various names, including Maisie and Marmaduke.

In animation, Mickey's nephews first appear in the 1933 Mickey Mouse film Giantland, although the film shows Mickey with as many as 14 nephews at the same time. The following year the nephews appear again in Gulliver Mickey. The following film, Mickey's Steam Roller, is the first to show Mickey with only two nephews, who can be presumed to be Morty and Ferdie, although they are unnamed in the film itself. This was two years after the twins debuted in the comic strip. Morty and Ferdie also make a cameo towards the end of 1938's Boat Builders and appear again in 1983's Mickey's Christmas Carol in speaking roles, albeit at different ages as one of the twins took on the role of Tiny Tim. In 1999, they make a cameo in the two-part Mickey Mouse Works segment "Around the World in Eighty Days", which was used again in House of Mouse. They also appear in the Mickey Mouse episode "The Scariest Story Ever: A Mickey Mouse Halloween Spooktacular!"

==== Madeline Mouse ====
Madeline Mouse is Mickey's blonde city cousin who appeared in "Love Trouble", a strip serial that ran from April 14 to July 5, 1941. While referred to as blonde in the story itself, Madeline has also been coloured with straight yellow fur in some printings of the story.

==== Melinda Mouse ====
Melinda Mouse (original Italian name Topolinda) is Mickey Mouse's aunt, created by Romano Scarpa in 1960 for his story The Chirikawa Necklace. Since 2004, she has become a regular recurring character in Italian Disney comics.

Melinda is a tall old lady with a long nose and she dresses in a very formal way. She wears a pair of earrings, but her ears are covered by hair. The colour of Melinda's hair changes according to the colourists, but in recent stories, they appear blond. In her debut story, young Melinda has black hair.

According to The Chirikawa Necklace, Melinda took care of Mickey when he was a baby. But one day, (taking advantage of a moment of distraction by Melinda) a young Big Bad Pete and his girlfriend Trudy Van Tubb kidnapped a baby Mickey Mouse and Melinda was forced to exchange Mickey for her Indian necklace. Years later, Mickey and his friend Atomo Beep-Beep discovered the truth and retrieved Melinda's necklace to her.

She is a lovely and cheerful person, and deeply attached to her nephew Mickey (with whom she shares a passion for mysteries and investigations) but the memory of baby Mickey's kidnapping caused her to develop feelings of guilt, and a too protective attitude towards her nephew.

==== Uncle Jeremy ====
Jeremy Mouse, better known as Uncle Jeremy, is Mickey Mouse's uncle and Melinda Mouse's brother, created by Bruno Sarda in 2000 for the story "Topolino e il tesoro di Alligator Bay" ("Mickey Mouse and the treasure of Alligator Bay"). In some stories, the differences of opinion between Uncle Jeremy and his nephew Mickey are highlighted, as Mickey's honesty and moral rectitude are unmatched by his uncle, who prefers to live by his wits, engaging in actions that border on dishonesty. He lives on a boat moored in Mouseton harbor with his faithful parrot, Agenore. Always eager to seek easy treasures and success, Uncle Jeremy seems to be something of a "black sheep" to the Mouse family. But even though he enjoys playing the jolly mercenary, he often shows a good heart. For this reason, Mickey appreciates him and is willing to turn a blind eye to his behavior.

=== Minnie Mouse's family ===
==== Marcus Mouse ====
Marcus Mouse is Minnie's father. He first appears as a farmer in the Mickey Mouse comic strip story line "Mr. Slicker and the Egg Robbers," first published between September 22 and December 26, 1930. He has also appeared in some English stories from 1930s Mickey Mouse Annuals.

==== Marshal Mouse and Matilda Mouse ====
Marshal Mouse and Matilda Mouse are Minnie's grandparents.

==== Millie and Melody Mouse ====
Millie and Melody Mouse

Millie and Melody Mouse are Minnie Mouse's twin nieces. Minnie has had an inconsistent list of nieces. In Europe and Brazil, most often a single niece is depicted, consistently named Melodia (Melody). She is a Disney Studio creation by Jim Fletcher in the mid-sixties whose primary "task" seems to be to drive Morty & Ferdie crazy.

However, in at least one other Italian or Brazilian tale Minnie did have another niece named Zizi (whether this was the name of Melody's twin or just another name for Melody is unknown). In America, Minnie's twin nieces have appeared under two names: Millie and Melody and Pammy and Tammy. Although the writer of these comics is unknown, they were both drawn by Paul Murry, who rarely worked with characters that sported the same names even if they ostensibly were the same characters. In Italy, there is another set of twin nieces, Lily & Tiny, who are in their teen years. These teenage nieces have yet to appear in comics printed in the USA.

It is reported that another name is attributed in American comics giving Minnie's single niece the name of Molly. Another set of nieces appear in an early Mickey Mouse book from the 1940s as triplets calling themselves "Dolly, Polly & Molly," while a lone niece attributed to Mickey appears in the cartoon Gulliver Mickey (1934) named "Maisie" (listed in Mickey Mouse: His Life and Times (Harper & Row, 1986)).

The only possible film appearance of any niece is in Mickey's Christmas Carol (1983), where Mickey Mouse, as Bob Cratchit, has a daughter. In this film Morty & Ferdie are said to have played Cratchit's two sons (including one as Tiny Tim), and since Melody seems to be the most consistent name used for any niece attributed to Minnie, it is probable that it was Melody who played the role of Bob Cratchit's daughter.

Millie and Melody appear as regular characters in the television series Minnie's Bow-Toons, both voiced by Avalon Robbins. They later appeared in the spinoff Mickey Mouse Mixed-Up Adventures, voiced by Vivian Vencer (Millie) and Stella Edwards (Melody), helping out the Happy Helpers in some episodes. They return in Mickey Mouse Clubhouse+, voiced again by Vencer and Edwards, where they first appear in "Mickey's Movie Night" as the Mystery Mousekepals when they are summoned to keep the patrons of Picture Pete's Drive-In Movie Theater entertained until Picture Pete has finished winding up the film reel to the Kansas City Mickey film that will be shown.

==== Uncle Mortimer ====
Uncle Mortimer, created by Walt Disney and Floyd Gottfredson for the Mickey Mouse comic strip, is Minnie's rancher uncle from whom she inherits an estate. He first appeared in the "Mickey Mouse in Death Valley" story line (1930). After that, he returned in several other Mickey Mouse comic strip adventures of the 1930s, in which Gottfredson gave him a markedly different appearance. He has occasionally appeared in more modern comics. He must not be confused with one of Mickey's antagonists, also called Mortimer Mouse.

==== Minnie's other nieces ====
Minnie Mouse has a variety of nieces besides Millie and Melody.

- Angela Mouse (Minnie's best friend)
- An unnamed baby niece (appeared in the 1944-02-26 strip by Bill Walsh)
- Giselle (French niece who appeared in the 1956-11-24 strip by Bill Walsh)
- Mildred (niece who appeared in the 1955-05-15 strip by Bill Walsh)

=== Donald Duck's family ===
==== Huey, Dewey, and Louie ====
Huey, Dewey, and Louie Duck are Donald's mischief-making nephews who provoke Donald with his famous temper. They first appeared in 1937.

==== Scrooge McDuck ====
Scrooge McDuck is Donald's wealthy uncle. He lives in the city of Duckburg and is of Scottish descent. Scrooge first appeared in 1947. He is best known for diving into his pool of money, a recurring gag in the DuckTales series.

==== Ludwig Von Drake ====
Ludwig Von Drake is Donald's eccentric uncle who is a resident scientist, lecturer, and psychiatrist. He was introduced in 1961, as part of Walt Disney's Wonderful World of Color.

=== Goofy's family ===
==== Max Goof ====
Max Goof (also known as "Goofy Junior" in 1950s short films) is Goofy's teenage son. He is a protagonist of the Goof Troop TV series (1992–1993) and of the feature film A Goofy Movie and its sequel An Extremely Goofy Movie. He has also made a few comics appearances, most of which were based on the TV series.

==== Gilbert Goof ====
Gilbert Goof is Goofy's nephew in Disney comic book appearances, and a smarter counterpart for Goofy. He was created by Bill Wright (plot and art) and first introduced in the Dell Four Color # 562 (1954). He made numerous comics appearances in the 1950s and 1960s. At one point, he became Super Goof's sidekick, calling himself "Super Gilly" ("Super Goof" #5 in "The Twister Resisters"). He has since appeared in various Italian comics stories.

==== Grandma Goofy ====
Grandma Goofy is Goofy's elderly but energetic grandmother, who first appeared in a 1944 Mickey Mouse Sunday page. She has made various appearances in American Mickey and Goofy stories, as well as in Italian stories. Although Grandma Goofy has not yet made a true animated appearance, Goofy impersonated her in the episode "Goofy's Grandma" of the Mickey Mouse television series.

==== Arizona Goof ====
Arizona Goof (original Italian name: "Indiana Pipps") is an archaeologist and a cousin of Goofy, being a clear parody of Indiana Jones, who appears exclusively in Italian comics. The character was created in 1988 by Bruno Sarda (plot) and Maria Luisa Uggetti (art) in the story Topolino & Pippo in: I predatori del tempio perduto (Topolino n° 1724). Arizona has a rare habit of not using beds, doors, or stairs. Instead, he sleeps in a tent, enters and exits houses through windows and climbs floors by a rope. Arizona is fond of a specific brand of liquorice candy (the brand is called Negritas in original Italian language version, Tuju in the Finnish language translation), which he never travels without and is addicted to the taste of, but which everyone else finds horrible. Arizona's car is an old jeep which he has named affectionately as Gippippa (Jeep + Pippo, Goofy's Italian name). Arizona has a rival archaeologist, Dr. Kranz, who is greedy and shameless and not above resorting to criminal behaviour. Arizona and Goofy look almost identical, which has been used as a plot device, when Goofy has masqueraded as Arizona to fool Dr. Kranz. For the readers' benefit, there is one small difference: Arizona has hairs dangling from his floppy ears, whereas Goofy's floppy ears are smooth.

Arizona Goof received his English name in his first American comics appearance (1991). In a couple of 2005–2006 appearances, the character was renamed "Arizona Dipp". But more recent uses (Disney Digicomics, 2009–2010) have restored his traditional English name.

== Antagonists ==
=== Pete ===
Pete (also called Peg-Leg Pete or Black Pete among other names) is a large, overweight anthropomorphic cat. He is the most recurring antagonist in Mickey Mouse stories. He was first introduced in 1925 as a bear. His character ranges from a hardened criminal to an ethical menace: depending on the context, he is either Mickey's archenemy or a simple nuisance. In the earlier comic strip storyline he was paired with Sylvester Shyster before evolving into the main villain. In the Goof Troop TV series and subsequent film adaptations, he is depicted as Goofy's exploitative friend and neighbor.

=== Kat Nipp ===
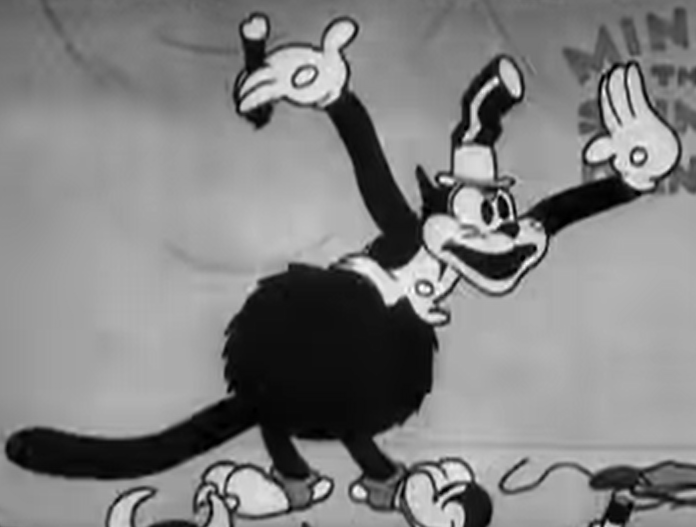
Kat Nipp in The Karnival Kid (1929)

Kat Nipp, his name being a play on the word catnip, is a villainous anthropomorphic cat. Kat Nipp is an often-drunk countryside tough guy who is a rival of Mickey Mouse.

Nipp made his debut in the animated short The Opry House (1929), in which he posed as a snake for a snake-charming act—continuing to smoke his pipe all the while. Nipp's other two appearances in animation also came in 1929, with When the Cat's Away and The Karnival Kid. The latter film introduced Nipp's habit of physically abusing Mickey, here by stretching out Mickey's nose to a ridiculous length. Kat Nipp is often mistaken for Pete.

Kat Nipp reappeared in a 1931 sequence of the Mickey Mouse newspaper comic strip (in which his friend Barnacle Bill, a sailor who is an expert in untying knots, appears). Kat Nipp was also used in the strips produced in the United Kingdom for the Mickey Mouse Annual. The character quickly faded away and has made only a handful of comics appearances since the mid-1930s.

Kat Nipp appears in the video game Kingdom Hearts III (2018), appearing in the minigame "The Karnival Kid" with his appearance from the short film of the same name, among the characters who order menus from Sora.

=== Sylvester Shyster ===
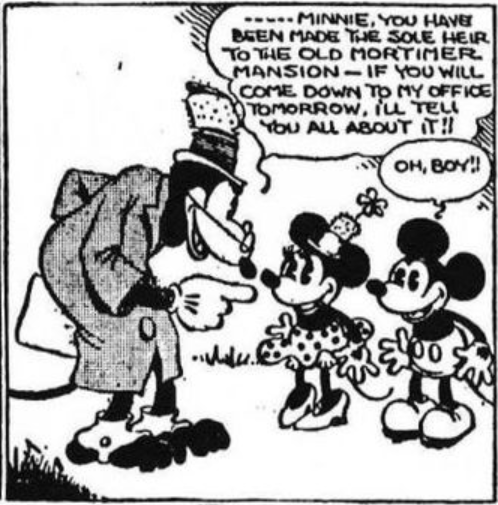
Sylvester Shyster (left) along with Minnie and Mickey in Mickey Mouse in Death Valley (1930).

Sylvester Shyster is a crooked lawyer and evil criminal mastermind who generally teams up with Pete. The character has been described by some as a weasel or a rat (the latter being Gottfredson's own interpretation), but his ears suggest that he is rather an anthropomorphic canine.

He first appeared in the comic strip adventure "Mickey Mouse in Death Valley", the first real Mickey Mouse continuity, which was partially written by Walt Disney and drawn by Win Smith and other artists, before being taken over by Floyd Gottfredson (plot and art). In this story, Sylvester Shyster was a crooked lawyer who attempted, with the help of his henchman Pete, to deprive Minnie Mouse of her inheritance.

Shyster and Pete have been causing trouble for Mickey and his friends since then. Shyster is generally depicted as the duo's brain, with Pete acting as the brawn. After Shyster's first appearance, Gottfredson made no further references to his profession as a lawyer, apart from his name. Later creators occasionally referenced Shyster's role as a lawyer, with one story ("Trial and Error," 2007) forcing Shyster to defend Mickey himself in an overseas courtroom. After 1934, Shyster disappeared for a time, leaving Pete as Mickey's main recurring antagonists. He made comebacks in 1942, 1950 and again in various 1960s Italian-created stories. More recently, publisher Egmont Creative A/S (in Denmark) revived Shyster as a regular character, a capacity in which he continues today.

Although Sylvester Shyster has not made an animated appearance in any Disney production, he appears briefly in the episode "Who Ate Wally's Waffles?" of the series Paradise PD at the entrance of Walt Disney World, being to date the only appearance in animation of the character.

=== The Mad Doctor ===
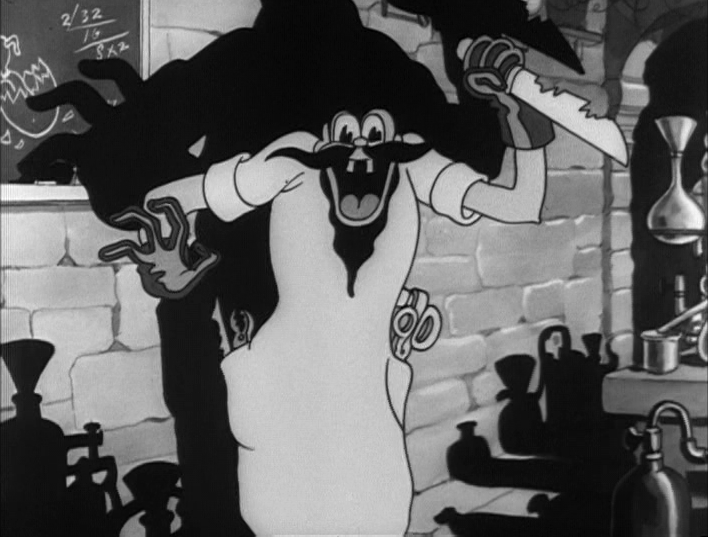
The Mad Doctor in The Mad Doctor (1933).

The Mad Doctor (also known as Dr. XXX) is a human mad scientist who serves as an infrequent antagonist of Mickey's. He first appeared in his self-titled short, in which he attempted to operate on Pluto by attaching his body to that of a chicken; this entire sequence turned out to be a dream.

The Mad Doctor makes a cameo appearance in the Roger Rabbit short Tummy Trouble, where a photo of him can be seen on the hospital wall.

He appears as an antagonist in some video games, being a boss enemy in Mickey Mania, a major antagonist in Epic Mickey and its sequel Epic Mickey 2, and an enemy in a mini-game of Kingdom Hearts III.

=== Professors Ecks, Doublex, and Triplex ===
Professors Eck, Doublex, and Triplex are a trio of ape mad scientists. The characters were created by Floyd Gottfredson (plot and art) in the Mickey Mouse comic strip in the Blaggard Castle storyline (1932-1933). Ecks is menacing black monkey, Doublex looks like him, but with light skin and wild black eyes, and Triplex is a more monstrous looking ape with long messy hair and bare feet. Triplex is the leader of the trio, and Ecks and Doublex find him frightening. While Gottfredson didn't mention any familial relationship, most later comics have presented the trio as brothers.

Gottfredson never featured the three professors in another story after Blaggard Castle, but they were memorable enough to return in stories under other authors in the 1970s.

Professor Ecks was originally considered for the role of the mad scientist in Runaway Brain, but it was later changed to a new character, Doctor Frankenollie.

=== Eli Squinch ===
Eli Squinch is an evil miser who first appeared as a villain in the Mickey Mouse comic strip in the Bobo the Elephant storyline (1934) as the abusive owner of an elephant which Mickey later forced Squinch to sell him. Squinch returned in several more storylines: originally depicted as an unscrupulous businessman, he evolved into an all-out criminal, playing alongside Pete a role similar to Sylvester Shyster's in earlier strips. He has reappeared sporadically in additional Disney comics stories up to the present day. His most recent United States appearance was in Mickey Mouse No. 321 (2016), published by IDW.

=== Doctor Vulter ===
Doctor Vulter is an anthropomorphic ape, resembling a gorilla. The character was created by Ted Osborne (plot) and Floyd Gottfredson (plot and art) in the story Mickey Mouse and the Pirate Submarine, published in the Mickey Mouse daily strip from September 1935 to January 1936. He is a megalomaniacal pirate captain and mad scientist, somewhat modeled after Jules Verne's Captain Nemo character. Using a futuristic submarine and a small army of henchmen, he plagues the seas by stealing various ships which he aims to use for his plans of world conquest. His principal weapon is a machine in the form of a large claw which gives off magnetic-like energy: by placing it against a ship's hull Vulter can turn the whole metal ship into one large magnet which sticks weapons to the wall, making them useless.

Vulter's Germanic-sounding name, his uniform and monocle, as well as his plans of world domination and militaristic gang, are obvious echoes of the Nazi menace of the time.

After being defeated by Mickey, Vulter never appeared again in American stories. He was later used by Italian authors, starting with the 1959 story Topolino e il ritorno dell'artiglio magnetico ("Mickey Mouse and the Return of the Magnetic Claw") by Guido Martina (plot) and Giulio Chierchini (art). The character was further elaborated in this story by the claim that he never drew plans of his inventions but kept it all in his mind; this proved a bit of a problem when he suffered from amnesia. He returned occasionally and is still used from time to time by European authors.

=== Mortimer Mouse ===
Mortimer Mouse – not to be confused with Minnie Mouse's uncle also named Mortimer Mouse – is introduced in the 1936 cartoon short Mickey's Rival, as Mickey's competitor for Minnie's affections. The year Mickey's Rival was produced, Floyd Gottfredson also used the character as an antagonist in one of the comic strip's storylines. In the comics, this Mortimer was briefly renamed Montmorency Rodent (pronounced "Ro-Dawn"), in an attempt to differentiate him from the pre-existing uncle, but the new name did not stick. Mickey's rival was once again called Mortimer in later comics – and in the animated series Mickey Mouse Works and House of Mouse, where he used the catchphrase, "Ha-cha-cha!".

In Mickey Mouse Works and House of Mouse, Mortimer as Mickey's rival is voiced by Maurice LaMarche, doing an exaggerated impersonation of Jon Lovitz. As Minnie's boss in Mickey's Once Upon a Christmas, he was voiced by Jeff Bennett. Mortimer Mouse also appeared in a non-speaking cameo in the Mickey Mouse Clubhouse episode Minnie's Birthday, sitting beneath a tree, playing a guitar. He later appeared in the Mickey Mouse Clubhouse episode "Super Adventure" as a villain where he intends to shrink the clubhouse. Bennett reprised his role as Mortimer in the television series Mickey Mouse and its spinoff The Wonderful World of Mickey Mouse. He also appeared in Mickey and the Roadster Racers as Morty McCool. Mortimer is a recurring character in Mickey Mouse Clubhouse+, where instead of Mickey's rival as in his previous appearances, he appears a close friend of Mickey and his gang.

=== The Phantom Blot ===
The Phantom Blot

The Phantom Blot is a mysterious enemy of Mickey Mouse who wears a body-length black sheet. Created in 1939 in Floyd Gottfredson's comic strip, the Phantom Blot became a commonly recurring character in European comics where he is one of Mickey's archenemies, second only to Pete. He was also reused, to a lesser extent, in American stories.

The Phantom Blot prefers being an ominous mastermind in the background, pulling strings and organising schemes, to engaging in physical criminal jobs.

The Phantom Blot is a master of disguise. He uses disguises to fool Mickey Mouse and the police, sometimes even appearing right in front of them without being noticed. When escaping the scene, the Phantom Blot often leaves a trademark "business card" - a sheet of white paper with a black splodge of ink on it.

When unmasked, the Phantom Blot is an anthropomorphic dog. He has a gaunt face with a long nose and a long, thin moustache. Phantom Blot's unmasked look was reportedly based on the features of Walt Disney himself.

The Phantom Blot and Pete are often bitter rivals, as both want to be recognised as the city's greatest criminal mastermind, and to get the most money out of the deal. However, some stories have shown them teaming up with each other.

The Phantom Blot made his animated debut in the DuckTales episode "All Ducks on Deck" voiced by Frank Welker. He is shown to be an agent of F.O.W.L.

The Phantom Blot appears as an antagonist in the TV series Mickey Mouse Works and its spinoff House of Mouse voiced by John O'Hurley.

An altered, monstrous version of the Phantom Blot, known as the "Shadow Blot", serves as the antagonist of the first Epic Mickey game. The Phantom Blot seemingly meets this creature in the city's museum when unlocking a dimensional portal, in the story The Blot and The Blob.

The Phantom Blot made a cameo appearance in the episode "Sock Burglar" from the TV series Mickey Mouse.

The Phantom Blot is a recurring antagonist during the third season of the DuckTales reboot, voiced by Giancarlo Esposito. While his history as a member of F.O.W.L. remains intact, this version came from a village that Magica De Spell attacked.

=== Willie the Giant ===
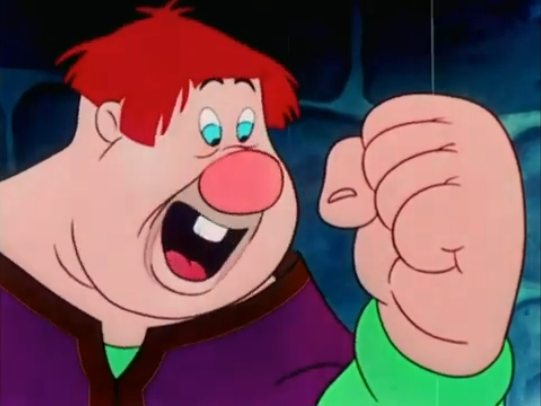
Willie in Fun and Fancy Free (1947)

Willie is a giant who appeared in the segment Mickey and the Beanstalk from the film Fun and Fancy Free (voiced by Billy Gilbert) as the antagonist. He is incredibly powerful, demonstrating amazing magic powers such as flight, invisibility and shapeshifting. Despite this, he is portrayed as immature and dimwitted, given his fondness for toys and inability to pronounce certain words, such as "pistachio". His favorite dish is implied to be chocolate pot roast with pistachios, given his overweight appearance. In other words, he is much dumber than the original giant that he is based on from Jack and the Beanstalk.

In Mickey's Christmas Carol, he (voiced by Will Ryan) is portrayed in a much more positive light, playing the role of the Ghost of Christmas Present who helps show Ebenezer Scrooge (Scrooge McDuck) the error of his ways. He makes a brief cameo in the 1988 film Who Framed Roger Rabbit on a poster in a movie theater in Toontown. Willie has also made cameo appearances in the television series House of Mouse.

Willie is a recurring character in the television series Mickey Mouse Clubhouse. From here, he is friends with Mickey. Willie still lives in the sky, only this time in a giant farmhouse. In the spinoff series Mickey Mouse Funhouse, Willie lives in the medieval location of Majestica where his farm is in the Cloud Kingdom. His Land of Myth and Legend counterpart is Woodsman Willie, a woodsman who lives in the forests of the Land of Myth and Legend. Will Ryan recorded some dialogue before his death with the last episode he voiced Willie in was "Witchy Worries". Starting in the episode "Tooth or Consequences", Willie is now currently voiced by Brock Powell. Willie also appears in Mickey Mouse Clubhouse+.

=== The Rhyming Man ===
The Rhyming Man is a villain who debuted in a comic strip storyline, The Atombrella and the Rhyming Man (May–October, 1948), written by Bill Walsh with art by Floyd Gottfredson. His name derives from the fact that he always talks in rhymes. A spy working for an unspecified foreign nation, the Rhyming Man tried to steal Eega Beeva's anti-atomic invention but was ultimately foiled by Mickey Mouse and Eega Beeva. An unusually dark and violent character by Disney comics standards, he was shown to actually murder one of his underlings. He was also depicted as possessing near-superhuman strength, the origin of which was never explained. Though never used again by American authors, the Rhyming Man was reused in Italian comic books first in a 1994 story where he appeared to have reformed, then in 2008 as the central antagonist of the four-part science-fiction story Topolino e il mondo che verrà in which he returned to his villainous roots.

=== Weasels ===
The Weasels are characters that originally appeared in the segment "The Wind in the Willows" of the film The Adventures of Ichabod and Mr. Toad (1949), where they act as antagonists of the story by deceiving the main character by selling him a stolen car. The first weasel is voiced by an uncredited Leslie Denison and the second weasel is voiced by an uncredited Edmond Stevens. After this appearance, they became recurring characters in Disney animated productions related to Mickey and his friends. Usually they are presented as thin brown Weasels who wear a sweater, pants and a cap.

A Weasel appears as a mugger in the Goofy short film How to Be a Detective (1952), voiced by Gerald Mohr.

In Mickey's Christmas Carol (1983), two Weasels appear as gravediggers in the graveyard, burying Ebenezer Scrooge (Scrooge McDuck), and making fun of the fact that there were not any mourners at his funeral, or for that matter any friends to bid him farewell. These weasels are voiced by Wayne Allwine and Will Ryan.

In Who Framed Roger Rabbit (1988), five Weasels partially based on those of "The Wind in the Willows", with different appearances and personalities, form the so-called "Toon Patrol", acting as the secondary antagonists of the story under the service of Judge Doom. The weasels consist of Smart Ass (voiced by David Lander), Stupid (voiced by Fred Newman), Wheezy (voiced by June Foray), Greasy (voiced by Charles Fleischer), and Psycho (also voice by Charles Fleischer). Each of them are killed at the end of the film, literally dying of laughter or being dissolved in Dip.

In The Prince and the Pauper (1990), the Weasels appear as royal guards, acting as the secondary antagonists under the orders of the Captain of the Guard (Pete). One weasel is voiced by Bill Farmer while other two weasels are voiced by Charlie Adler.

In the TV series DuckTales, a Weasel appears as a prosecutor in the episode "Duckman of Aquatraz", voiced by Ed Gilbert. Two Weasels also appear as henchmen of Flintheart Glomgold in the episode "Horse Scents". Two other Weasels from Australia appear in the episode "Back Out in the Outback", voiced by Will Ryan.

In the series Bonkers, a Weasel makes a cameo appearance in the episode "The 29th Page" as a suspect in a police lineup while in the episode "Get Wacky", a Weasel named Wacky (voiced by Rip Taylor) has a more prominent role as the main antagonist of the episode, having an appearance that more closely resembles the Weasels from Who Framed Roger Rabbit.

In the series Mickey Mouse Works, a Weasel appears in the cartoon "Mickey's Mechanical House" as a realtor (voiced by Jeff Bennett) selling a modern mechanical house to Mickey. The Weasels make several appearances in the series House of Mouse. Some Weasels have appeared in the series with different appearances and professions, like one appearing in the episode "The Three Caballeros" working as Donald's lawyer (voiced by Jim Cummings) or another appearing in the episode "Rent Day" working as a cheese shop salesman (voiced by Jeff Bennett) during a flashback where Mickey paid him the rent money needed to pay the landlord Pete for some cheese. In the episode "Pete's House of Villains" after Pete began to take over the club, Pete put the weasels (all voiced by Jim Cummings) to work as waiters replacing the Penguins, but they robbed customers while doing so. As Pete fires a weasel, he tells Pete "You can't fire me, I have friends in high places". Pete then gets crushed by a safe dropped by some other weasels.

In the series The Wonderful World of Mickey Mouse, the Weasels appear in the episode "Cheese Wranglers" as bandits working for Pete. They are voiced by Chris Diamantopoulos and Bill Farmer.

The TV series Mickey Mouse Funhouse features the Weasel Trio, led by Wheezelene (voiced by Jenifer Lewis) and consisting of Cheezel (voiced by Richard Kind) and Sneezel (voiced by Brock Powell). Cheezel is the shortest of the trio and Sneezel is the largest of the trio. They appear on each of the Adventure Worlds and often cause all sorts of mischief and wrongdoing, which always ends with Mickey and his friends thwarting them and setting them straight.

Different Weasels appear as enemies in the video game Goofy's Hysterical History Tour. In the video game Mickey Mania, Weasels appear as enemies in the level based on "The Prince and the Pauper", with some throwing knives and others throwing arrows. A Weasel appears in the video game Mickey Mouse Kindergarten, where after stealing Chief O'Hara's cap, Mickey must find him hiding in an alley.

The Weasels act as the main antagonists in the video game Mickey's Speedway USA, kidnapping Pluto to steal the diamond-encrusted collar he is wearing, so Mickey and his gang embark on an adventure around the world to find the Weasels and rescue Pluto, until in the game's epilogue the Weasels are arrested.

In the video game Mickey Saves the Day, several Weasels appear as Pete's henchmen in his plan to become mayor of the town, working for him as policemen or security guards.

=== Scuttle ===
Scuttle, called Weasel or Catfoot in some stories, is the weasel sidekick and right-hand man of Mickey Mouse's nemesis Pete. He looks up to Pete and thinks of him as the greatest criminal mastermind ever. However, Scuttle himself is not very bright and usually fails to understand Pete's plans and orders, to the latter's annoyance. Physically, Scuttle is much slimmer than the overweight Pete: he has a long face and is generally depicted with a bushy beard. Some series have shown Scuttle as being more educated than Pete in some areas. For example, one comic book story where the two were stealing art objects showed that Scuttle is an educated art critic, unlike Pete who only cares for the monetary value. Scuttle has often teamed up with another sidekick-type criminal named Dum-Dum. The two have sometimes worked together as henchmen for Pete, or on their own. Scuttle was created by artist Paul Murry and an unidentified writer in 1951. He first appeared in the comic book story Donald Duck Captures the Range Rustlers.

=== Beagle Boys ===
The Beagle Boys are a family of thieves, mainly associated with the Donald Duck universe, although they have occasionally served as Mickey's enemies in some comics, and some animated productions such as the film Mickey, Donald, Goofy: The Three Musketeers (2004), or the episode "Touchdown and Out" (2017) of the television series Mickey Mouse and the episode "Keep on Rollin'" (2020) of its spin-off The Wonderful World of Mickey Mouse, or as Goofy's rivals in their animated debut in Sport Goofy in Soccermania (1987).

=== Trudy Van Tubb ===
Trudy Van Tubb is an obese anthropomorphic cat, the girlfriend of Pete, with whom she usually shares the profession of delinquent. She has a similar size and body shape to Pete, but her hair is depicted as grey or orange depending on the stories, while Pete's hair is black. Trudy is not very proficient as a criminal but she is a skilled cook and Pete enjoys her cooking.

Trudy is very devoted to Pete and often gets jealous of Minnie Mouse and other women Pete kidnaps for ransom. When the two get caught, Trudy often gets away with a more lenient sentence because of her lesser involvement.

Trudy was created by Romano Scarpa in 1960 for the story The Chirikawa Necklace. She has since appeared exclusively, though very regularly, in Italian comic book stories.

=== Emil Eagle ===
Emil Eagle is a mad scientist and, as his name suggests, an anthropomorphic eagle, who first appeared in 1966 in the Donald Duck universe as a rival for Gyro Gearloose. He has since appeared alternatively in the Donald Duck and Mickey Mouse universes. In the latter universe, he is a recurring antagonist for Mickey Mouse and, in particular, for Goofy in his Super Goof incarnation.

=== Dangerous Dan and Idgit the Midget ===
"Dangerous" Dan McBoo and Idgit (sometimes spelled "Idjit") "the Midget" are a pair of criminals created by Paul Murry in the 1966 comics story Treasure of Oomba Loomba. The large and overweight Dangerous Dan is the brawn of the duo while the balding and diminutive Idgit is its brain. They appeared as recurring antagonists of Mickey Mouse in various comic book stories.

=== Professor Nefarious ===
Professor Nefarious (a parody of Professor Moriarty) is a villain who origins in the 1975 comic book The Case of the Pea Soup Burglaries. He is the Sleuth's arch-enemy. A London-based criminal mastermind, Nefarious sees himself as a "teacher of crime" for his three henchmen-pupils Fliplip, Sidney and Armadillo. Their hideout is a rundown townhouse with the words "University of Criminal Sciences" written on its front door. While Nefarious is reasonably smart (although his own megalomania sometimes hinders his plans), his three accomplices are thoroughly inept comical villains. Mickey and the Sleuth imprison the gang at the end of each story, although Nefarious himself generally manages to escape. Nefarious never realizes that the Sleuth is totally clueless and that the Sleuth's assistant Mickey Mouse is the one who actually foils him.

=== Portis ===
Portis (original Italian name Plottigat) is an anthropomorphic cat, created by Romano Scarpa in the 1977 story Topolino e il Pippo-Lupo. He is Pete's "mad scientist" cousin. Depicted as an arrogant and megalomaniacal criminal mastermind, Portis is often Pete and Trudy's accomplice but he occasionally works on his own or with other villains such as the Phantom Blot. The character has appeared exclusively in Italian comics stories.

=== Charlie Doublejoke ===
Charlie Doublejoke (original Italian name Vito Doppioscherzo) is a criminal genius with a penchant for elaborate jokes and pranks. An anthropomorphic dog, he was created in 2004 by Casty (plot) and Massimo de Vita (art) and has since been a recurring antagonist in Italian comics stories. Besides his signature laugh "Wah-wah-wah", a characteristic of his is the bowler hat that he does not only like to wear, but that also informs the shape of his transportation devices.

In a manner similar to the Joker, Doublejoke often not only pulls pranks on Mickey and the police, but betrays his own partners in crime as well, escaping alone with the booty.

He is so manipulative and charismatic that he managed to fool the entirety of Mouseton into thinking he was a good guy more than once, with Mickey usually being the only one skeptical of him (according to his debut story "The Magnificent Doublejoke", they were schoolmates until Charlie's habits of bullying others had gone so far that he was expelled from school).

== Other supporting characters ==
=== Oswald the Lucky Rabbit ===
Oswald is an anthropomorphic black rabbit created by Walt Disney for Winkler Pictures and Universal Pictures. In 2006, The Walt Disney Company acquired the rights to Oswald, and have since used him in the Epic Mickey video game franchise. He is described metafiction ally as Mickey's older half "brother" in the video game Epic Mickey. Otherwise, the character has remained independent from and appears infrequently in the franchise.

=== Ortensia the Cat ===
Ortensia in Sky Scrappers (1928).

Ortensia is the girlfriend of Oswald the Lucky Rabbit. She appeared in nine of the shorts starring Oswald, starting with The Banker's Daughter (1927; Lost cartoon), replacing Oswald's former love interest, a much more feminine and sultry rabbit named Fanny in production materials. Ortensia's original name during the production of the Oswald shorts was Sadie, as referenced in the title of the animated short Sagebrush Sadie (1928; Lost cartoon). The names for Oswald's love interests were never widely publicized, which is likely the reason she was given a new name in Epic Mickey, following the alliteration pattern of Mickey and Minnie's mirrored relationship. Often in the original Oswald shorts, Oswald would compete with Pete for her affection. She also appeared in Oswald shorts produced by Charles Mintz and later Walter Lantz. In the Lantz shorts, she was called "Kitty". To add some confusion, copyright synopses of some Mintz and Lantz shorts erroneously refer to Ortensia/Kitty as Fanny.

In addition to the short films produced by Walt Disney during 1920s, she appears in the 2013 web short Oswald Holiday Greeting Card and in the 2022 short film Oswald the Lucky Rabbit.

In video games, she appears as a supporting character in Epic Mickey and its sequel Epic Mickey 2: The Power of Two, and as a playable character in Disney Speedstorm.

=== Percy and Patricia Pigg ===
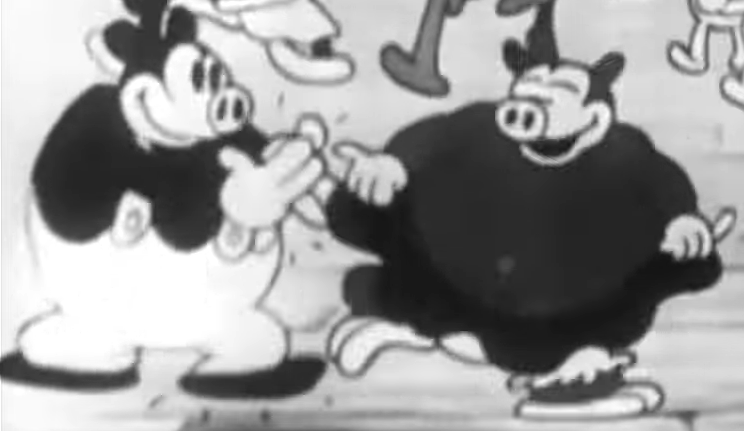
Percy and Patricia in The Shindig (1930).

Percy and Patricia Pigg (sometimes the surname being written as "Pig") are a married couple of anthropomorphic pigs. Percy made his debut in 1929 in the short The Opry House, Patricia debuting that same year in Mickey's Follies, also Percy's second appearance, with this one and The Shindig (1930) being the only shorts in which both characters appear together. Additionally, Percy appeared in the short films The Barnyard Concert (1930), The Chain Gang (1930) and Traffic Troubles (1931), while Patricia appeared in Mickey's Revue (1932) and The Whoopee Party (1932).

After their appearances in short films, they started appearing in comics, but the two characters did not appear again in animation until 1983, in Mickey's Christmas Carol, briefly appearing dancing at Fezzywig's party.

Percy appears in the video game Kingdom Hearts III (2018) in the minigame "Taxi Troubles" (based on Traffic Troubles), where he is one of the characters that Sora must pick up in his taxi.

=== Butch ===
Butch is an anthropomorphic dog. Butch appeared as a gangster in "Mr. Slicker and the Egg Robbers". A sympathetic criminal, he eventually reformed, became Mickey's friend and remained in the strip as a supporting character until June 1931. He was revived in the 1990s as a member of Mickey's supporting cast in European Disney comics.

=== Gideon Goat ===
Gideon Goat, or Giddy Goat, is an anthropomorphic goat, a supporting character in the Mickey Mouse comic strips of the 1930s. Gideon first appeared in the 1930 Mickey Mouse Book No. 1. He appeared in various American and European printed Disney comics until 1938. He was usually characterized as a farmer or the local sheriff. Gideon is married to a female anthropomorphic goat named Gertie (presumably Gertrude) who appeared in many early Mickey Mouse comics, primarily as a background character.

Promotional materials for the 1935 animated short The Band Concert include Giddy Goat as one of the characters. In the released film, he was replaced by an unnamed trombonist dog character.

Floyd Gottfredson made regular use of the character in his comic strips and later artists sometimes borrowed the character.

=== Clara Cluck ===
Clara Cluck debuted in 1934 in the Mickey Mouse cartoon Orphan's Benefit. Since then she has appeared as a semi-regular character in the Mickey Mouse cartoons. In the comic books she is depicted in the Duck universe as Daisy Duck's best friend. Clara has been a member of Mickey's original farmyard gang since the beginning of his career, although she is seen less often than Clarabelle Cow and Horace Horsecollar. She originally was voiced by Florence Gill and later by Russi Taylor and Kaitlyn Robrock.

Clara's singing is meant to be a caricature of the Bel canto style of opera singing popular at the time of her appearance. Some of her arias are clearly modelled on those of Tosca. Her last major appearance was as one of the musicians in Symphony Hour. Curiously, although she is seen in the rehearsal scenes at the beginning, she is not seen in the performance scenes at the end.

In Disney comics she has been shown to date Gus Goose on very few occasions, and in the initial appearance of Panchito Pistoles she was the object of his affections.

As with other Disney characters, she was given small cameos in Mickey's Christmas Carol (1983), Who Framed Roger Rabbit (1988), and Once Upon a Studio (2023).

In television, she had some appearances in Mickey Mouse Works (1999), where she is presented as Daisy Duck's neighbor. She appeared occasionally in House of Mouse (2001). In one episode of that series, "Double Date Don", she fell in love with Donald Duck and aggressively pursued him by puckering her lips in front of him, forcing him to dance with her, wearing dresses and posing provocatively to lure him in. At one point she even grabs Donald and forcibly, yet passionately, kisses him full on the lips. She almost tricked Donald into marrying her but Daisy stopped the wedding in time. She also had appeared to put Minnie Mouse in jail for driving her car through Daisy's house to deliver an apple pie of hers. She also appeared as a recurring character in the series Mickey and the Roadster Racers (2017), where she is the mother of two chicks named Cleo and Clifford.

In video games, Clara Cluck made a cameo appearance in the Timeless River world of Kingdom Hearts II with many other Disney characters like Clarabelle Cow and Horace Horsecollar as one of the world's citizens, being one of the rare media in which the character is seen speaking (her dialogue being seen in speech balloons). She appears in Disney Magic Kingdoms as a playable character available to unlock for a limited time.

She also makes an appearance in the Mickey's Boo to You Parade and for rare meet and greets at Walt Disney World's Magic Kingdom.

=== Doctor Einmug ===
Doctor Einmug is a scientist who was created by Ted Osborne (plot) and Floyd Gottfredson (plot and art) in the story Island in the Sky, published in the Mickey Mouse comic strip from November 1936 to April 1937. He is a large man who wears a big white beard and laboratory coat.

Doctor Einmug specializes in atomic physics and speaks in a German-like accent which was probably a nod towards Albert Einstein, "mug" also being a pun on "stein". His introductory story, Island in the Sky, raises many issues about the benefits and dangers of atomic physics just a few years before the first atom bombs were developed.

After that, Einmug did not re-appear in American comics for almost 50 years, but he was used in Italian ones, starting some 12 years later in 1959 when he appeared in Romano Scarpa's Topolino e la dimensione Delta ("Mickey Mouse and the Delta Dimension"). In this story, he discovered the means to travel to the Delta Dimension, which was effectively an infinite void of nothing, just space.

Setting his laboratory up in the Delta Dimension, Einmug pursued his work and discovered that atoms were living beings. He thus increased the size of one of them to that of a small boy and named him Atomo Bleep-Bleep (Italian: Atomino Bip-Bip).

Einmug himself has also appeared in numerous European Mickey Mouse comics. He is often shown as less secretive and paranoid than in his original appearance, though his discoveries are still coveted by the likes of Pete and the Phantom Blot.

Einmug reappeared in American comics in 1991 in the story A Snatch in Time! in which he had developed a time machine. It was written by Lamar Waldron and drawn by Rick Hoover and Gary Martin. More recently, Einmug has also appeared in American editions of The Delta Dimension and other European-made stories.

=== Detective Casey ===
Detective Casey (sometimes Inspector Casey) is Chief O'Hara's head detective, first appearing in the Mickey Mouse daily comic in the 1938 sequence The Plumber's Helper. The story was plotted and penciled by Floyd Gottfredson and written by Merrill De Maris. Casey disappeared from American comics in the 1950s, but was used frequently in Europe, especially in Italy, afterwards; from 2003, he returned as a frequent player in the American comics.

Despite his occupation, Casey is an impatient man of only average intelligence. Thus, while sometimes a successful detective, he is prone to bungling cases as well. Therefore, Chief O'Hara often recruits Mickey Mouse to help solve some of Casey's cases, much to Casey's general irritation.

=== Chief O'Hara ===
Chief Seamus O'Hara is the chief of police in the Mickey Mouse universe. He plays a supportive role in Mickey Mouse's comic-book mysteries, often relying on Mickey's help to solve crimes committed by criminals such as Pete, The Phantom Blot and others. Known fellow officers include his head detective, Detective Casey.

The character was conceived by Floyd Gottfredson and Merrill De Maris for Disney's comic strips as a stereotypical Irish cop. He first appeared in the newspaper strips in May 1939, in the serial Mickey Mouse Outwits the Phantom Blot. He eventually became a recurring character in European comics stories. O'Hara also appeared on Mickey Mouse Works and House of Mouse, voiced by Corey Burton.

In the Brazilian version of the comics, he is known as "Coronel Cintra", in the Danish versions as "Politimester Striks", in the Finnish translation, he is known as "Poliisimestari Simo Sisu" (possibly named after the Finnish concept of sisu), in the French versions as "Commissaire Finot", in the German versions as "Kommissar Albert Hunter" (Kommissar means commissioner in German), in the Italian version as "Commissario Adamo Basettoni" (with "Basettoni" referring to his prominent sideburns, "basette"), and in the Swedish versions as "Kommissarie Konrad Karlsson".

In Italian stories, O'Hara has a wife called Petulia. Before her introduction, O'Hara frequently mentions his wife, with the first instance of this being "The Gleam" (1942).

=== The How-to Narrator ===
The How-to Narrator is a narrator that serves as a guide in short films starring Goofy where he shows how to do different types of activities. The How-to Narrator also has participation in the television series Goof Troop (1992), Mickey Mouse Works (1999-2000), House of Mouse (2001-2003), and How to Stay at Home (2021).

=== Pete Junior ===
Pete Junior, better known simply as P.J., is Pete's son. He appears for first time in the short Bellboy Donald, as a naughty little kid. Later, he appears in the TV series Goof Troop, this time as a kind pre-teen, and being Max Goof's best friend. After that he appeared in the film A Goofy Movie, also in the role of Max's best friend, and its sequel An Extremely Goofy Movie, where he, Max, and their friend Bobby go to college. He also makes a cameo in the DuckTales reboot episode, "Quack Pack", where he is seen in a photo from Goofy's wallet.

=== José Carioca ===
José "Zé" Carioca is a green, Brazilian parrot who first appears in the Disney film Saludos Amigos (1942) alongside Donald Duck. He returned in the 1944 film The Three Caballeros along with Donald and a Mexican rooster named Panchito Pistoles. José is from Rio de Janeiro, Brazil (thus the name "Carioca", which is a term used for a person born in Rio de Janeiro). Zé Carioca comic books are still regularly published in Brazil to this day.

=== Panchito Pistoles ===
Panchito Pistoles is a red, Mexican rooster who was created as the third titular caballero (along with Donald Duck and José Carioca) for the 1944 film The Three Caballeros. Later he appeared in several Disney comics, including a year-long run in the Silly Symphony Sunday comic strip (1944–1945), as well as Don Rosa's comic book stories The Three Caballeros Ride Again (2000) and The Magnificent Seven (Minus 4) Caballeros (2005).

=== Aracuan Bird ===
The Aracuan Bird, also called the Clown of the Jungle, first appeared in the feature film The Three Caballeros (1944). The film's narrator introduces the Aracuan as "one of the most eccentric birds you have ever seen".

=== Eega Beeva ===
Eega Beeva, also known by his proper name Pittisborum Psercy Pystachi Pseter Psersimmon Plummer-Push, is a human from the future, although some translations refer to him as an alien. He was created by Floyd Gottfredson (art) and Bill Walsh (plot) and first appeared on September 26, 1947, in the Mickey Mouse comic strip storyline The Man of Tomorrow. The complete original run of Eega Beeva stories has been anthologised in The Floyd Gottfredson Library volumes 9 Rise of the Rhyming Man and 10 Planet of Faceless Foes, published by Fantagraphics Books in 2016. The story arcs are given the titles "The Man of Tomorrow", "Mickey Makes a Killing", "Pflip the Thnuckle-booh", "The Santa Claus Bandit", "The Kumquat Question", "The Atombrella and the Rhyming Man", "An Education for Eega", "Pflip's Strange Power", "Planet of the Aints" (alternate title "Be-junior and the Aints"), "Itching Gulch", "The Syndicate of Crime", and "The Moook Treasure". Eega's final appearance is a three day bridge between story arcs; for convenience, the anthology prints this event as the start of the story arc "Mousepotamia", in which Mickey is abducted to a foreign land, bereft of all his traditional companions.

In Eega's debut story, Mickey Mouse and Goofy seek shelter from a thunderstorm and get lost in a cave. There, Mickey suddenly encounters an unusual humanoid who only says "Eega" at first. When Mickey and Goofy find the cave's exit, Mickey invites the being to stay at his house, and the being identifies himself as "Pittisborum Psercy Pystachi Pseter Psersimmon Plummer-Push". Finding this name too cumbersome, Mickey gives him the name "Eega Beeva" (a corruption of the idiom "eager beaver"). At first, Goofy refuses to believe in the existence of Eega Beeva and ignores his presence. In a series of events, two scientists conclude that Eega Beeva is a human from 500 years in the future. At the end of the storyline, Eega saves Goofy from a skiing accident, causing them to become friends.

In the next comic strip storyline starring Eega Beeva, Mickey Makes a Killing, his pet Pflip the Thnuckle Booh is introduced. Eega continues being Mickey's sidekick in the American comic strips until July 1950.

Eega Beeva is depicted as a humanoid with a wide head, mitten-like hands and a scrawny body. In The Man of Tomorrow, the name is given to him by Mickey, since Eega Beeva originally only said "Eega." In the original conception of the character, Eega Beeva's look was attributed to him being a highly evolved human from 500 years in the future, namely from the year 2447. All humans would have Eega-like proportions. He wears short, black trousers which have pockets of seemingly infinite size and can hold a multitude of objects sometimes much bigger than Eega Beeva himself (similar to Doctor Who's TARDIS), often helping Mickey Mouse and Eega in difficult situations. A running joke in the comic is that when Eega Beeva is searching for something in his pockets, he has to take multiple attempts, as he first finds completely unrelated objects.

Another trademark attribute of the character is his "alien" speech, adding a "p" at the beginning of most words. From his first appearance, he has been shown to prefer sleeping on top of narrow poles, such as on top of Mickey Mouse's bedpost. He eats pickled kumquats for food (changed to mothballs in Italian translations and stories produced in Italy) and is severely allergic to cash; these traits have sometimes been used as plot devices.

While a genius scientist by today's standards, Eega Beeva is also maladjusted to the contemporary world. Depending on the stories and writers, his behaviour ranges from naïve and eccentric (including being "primitive" and attacking radios as demons) to serious and rational (being able to recite complex scientific equations which leave Earth's best scientists baffled). Other members of Eega's species are glimpsed briefly. In his wallet he keeps a photograph of his fiancée (who is beautiful even by 20th century standards), and his farewell moments show additional snapshots of his father, mother, grandfather, and sister. He also has a brother, whose picture is obscured in the scene depicting the others.

Eega Beeva was a central character in the American newspaper Disney comic strips, for nearly three years. He was Mickey Mouse's main sidekick during this period, effectively replacing Goofy, whose appearances became few and far between. This lasted until July 1950, when Eega abruptly returned to his home in the future. Walsh's stories are often wildly inconsistent in themselves as to what Eega Beeva's attributes and back story are, as pointed out in the editorial columns in The Floyd Gottfredson Library. During his first story "The Man of Tomorrow", Goofy declares that Eega is only a hallucinatory apparition because he casts no shadow, when in fact an earlier panel in the story showed Eega's shadow. In Eega's farewell appearance, he refers to his family as "the Beeva family". As he departs into the cave where Mickey first met him, he implies that his family live in there are eagerly awaiting his homecoming. This contradicts his first story, where "Beeva" is a name Mickey made up for him, and Eega's family were not yet to be born for another 400 or more years.

While Eega Beeva was still being featured in the American comic strips, he made his first appearance in a 1949 Italian comic story titled L'inferno di Topolino (lit. "Mickey Mouse's inferno," Topolino issue 7), in which Mickey plays Dante Alighieri in a theatre production of the Divine Comedy. The character was newly discovered and defined by Italian comics artist and writer Romano Scarpa with the comic Topolino e la nave del microcosmo (lit. "Mickey Mouse and the ship of microcosm"), published in Topolino 167 in July 1957; American translation published in BOOM's Mickey Mouse Classics 1 - Mouse Tails (2010). (Eega had previously appeared in stories which Scarpa drew but did not write, including Guido Martina's Topolino e il doppio segreto di Macchia Nera in Topolino 116-119, 1955 - Americanised in Gladstone's Mickey and Donald 6-8 [1988] and Fantagraphics' hardcover album Mickey Mouse: The Phantom Blot's Double Mystery [2018].) Rather than his whimsical attributes, the "microcosm" story focuses on the futuristic and fantastic aspects of Eega Beeva and his environment, as do later stories. In Germany some of those stories star Eega Beeva without Mickey. The character has since been used numerous times by European authors, mostly in Italy where more than half of all comics featuring him were produced. He is referred to as Eta Beta in Italian and Gamma in German.

Older Italian stories often portrayed him as an alien from outer space. More recently (post-2000), Italian writers have generally reverted to Gottfredson's original conception of Eega as a future-man, though his precise year of origin is rarely mentioned. More recent Eega comics produced by Egmont, on the other hand, often refer to his hometown as being the Mouseton of 2447, just as in Gottfredson's original stories.

=== Ellsworth ===
Ellsworth started as Goofy's pet mynah bird, but in later stories, he became an independent anthropomorphic animal. His full name is Ellsworth Bheezer (occasionally misspelled Bhezer—"beezer" is old English slang for a big nose or beak). He was created by Bill Walsh (plot) and Manuel Gonzales (art) for the Mickey Mouse Sunday pages, where he made his first appearance on October 30, 1949. Ellsworth remained for ten years a major character in the Sunday pages, sometimes stealing the spotlight from Mickey. In 1956 he started appearing in the daily pages, when these became gag-focused as well. He has also been used in longer comics stories, especially the ones produced in Italy, France and Brazil. In France, he has been the protagonist of his own series, published from 1985 to 2009 in Le Journal de Mickey.

Ellsworth usually wears a red-orange shirt and a green cap or beret. Reflecting a trait of mynah birds who can imitate human speech, he is extremely vain and self-centered, which was originally the spotlight and center of jokes in his stories. On the other hand, Ellsworth is also a bonafide genius with awesome tech and scientific knowledge—the "Y" on his shirt in earlier stories stands for "Yarvard" (a parody of Harvard), his alma mater.

Despite being more or less entirely humanized in more recent stories, Ellsworth retains his ability to fly, a unique trait among the central Disney funny animal cast.

In manner, Ellsworth is often sarcastic and condescending, typically addressing others with statements like "Let's not [do X], shall we?" He is also quick to call others by insulting nicknames. But when push comes to shove, he is genuinely fond of and defensive of his pals Goofy and Mickey.

=== Clarice ===
Clarice is a chipmunk who appeared in the short film Two Chips and a Miss (1952), being the romantic interest of Chip and Dale, for whom they both compete for her attention, although she seems to love them both equally (at the end of the short film ending by giving both of them a kiss). She works as a singer in a night club.

Despite her only appearance in a short film, she became a very popular character, appearing in Disney Parks as a meet-and-greet character or in live shows, and appearing in the video games Disney Tsum Tsum (2014) and Disney Magical World 2 (2015).

Clarice did not have an animated appearance again since Two Chips and a Miss until she appeared as a recurring character in the television series Chip 'n' Dale: Park Life (2021-present), having a radical design change, being a tough chipmunk, wearing no clothes, and having for a hairstyle a crest with flowers shaved on the sides of the head. In the series she lives in the engine of a car that is on a tree. Her relationship with Chip and Dale is also simply friendship, although they admire her for her abilities, she being very constructive and being constantly fixing and repairing things.

=== Atomo Bleep-Bleep ===
Atomo Bleep-Bleep (Italian: Atomino Bip-Bip, lit. '"Little Atom Beep-Beep"') is a "humanized atom" created by Doctor Einmug, who used a gigantic meson accelerator to enlarge atoms to the size of a human child. The character was created by Romano Scarpa in the 1959 story Topolino e la dimensione Delta ("Mickey Mouse in the Delta Dimension"), published in Topolino No. 206. Bleep-Bleep is a good-natured, highly intelligent, hard-working blue creature with electrons constantly spinning around his large bald head. He was created at the same time as his "brother", a red atom named Bloop-Bloop, who was bad-tempered and lazy. Bleep-Bleep can spit mesons to alter or manipulate the attributes of physical objects and uses this ability to accomplish various feats such as turning metal into chocolate or estimating with absolute precision when an object was created. In their first adventure together, Atomo and Mickey manage to foil Pete, who has enlisted Bloop-Bloop as his accomplice. Scarpa wrote and drew a further eight stories with Atomo that appeared in Topolino from 1959 to 1965. The character has been revived occasionally by other Italian authors. In his appearance as well as his role in the stories, Atomo is very similar to Gottfredson's Eega Beeva, a short, friendly science-fiction character with unpredictable powers that drive the plot. In English-language translations, Atomo Bleep-Bleep speaks with a German accent identical to Einmug's, insofar as Einmug was presented as Atomo's language teacher.

=== Glory-Bee ===
Glory-Bee was Goofy's girlfriend who first appeared in a Mickey Mouse daily strip on June 19, 1969. She was first created by Bill Walsh, and appeared in some "Mickey Mouse" dailies by Floyd Gottfredson, and others written by Del Connell (drawn by Manuel Gonzales). Her predecessor appeared perhaps as early as 1946, in the form of Minnie Mouse's Aunt Marissa (from a multi-part story by Floyd Gottfredson printed in the Mickey Mouse dailies June 17–29, 1946, and reprinted twice in WDC&S No. 95 and No. 575, and later seen in a cameo one-page gag love story by Bill Walsh and Manuel Gonzales which also featured Mickey Mouse and Montmorency Rodent (Mortimer Mouse) (April 21, 1946) that has been dubbed "Spring, Love, Monty").

Glory-Bee is a slender, pretty, blonde, and young dognose lady who, while quite good-natured and likable, tends to be somewhat of an "airhead" (a stereotype of the "dumb blonde"), which may explain why she was dropped from Goofy's storyline altogether (though a better possibility is that Goofy will always be the consummate bachelor). While it might be difficult to imagine she had a very strong crush on Goofy, he hardly seemed to notice. Occasionally, however, he did try to impress her, even to the point of trying to reveal his Super Goof identity to her, to no avail. At one point Glory-Bee and Clarabelle Cow were even vying for Goofy's attention, but both failed to achieve their objective (WDS #8).

Glory-Bee has disappeared from comics in the USA and has seldom appeared in foreign comics.

=== The Sleuth ===
The Sleuth, Sureluck Sleuth in full, is an anthropomorphic canine. He is an English private eye operating in 19th century London and employing Mickey Mouse as an assistant. The character was created by Carl Fallberg (plot) and Al Hubbard (art) for the Disney Studio Program and intended solely for foreign publication. The first story in the series is "Mickey and the Sleuth: The Case of the Wax Dummy". Unusually for material created for the program, this story appeared domestically in the Procter & Gamble Disney Magazine giveaway and then was published by Gold Key in "Walt Disney Showcase" n°38 (1977). Mickey and the Sleuth stories were produced up until the late 1980s. Given their historical setting, these stories stand apart from other Mickey Mouse continuities. It is never explained if the "Mickey Mouse" working with the Sleuth is an ancestor of the present-day Mickey or if those stories are included in a totally different continuity. Adding to the muddle are the frequent humorous anachronisms which complicate the purportedly Victorian setting, and arguably place the stories in the genre of steampunk. Apart from Mickey, no other prominent Disney characters are featured in the stories. The Sleuth's recurring antagonists are Professor Nefarious and his three bumbling henchmen.

The Sleuth is a good-natured gentleman; wearing a deerstalker hat, smoking a pipe and using a magnifying glass, he is an obvious parody of Sherlock Holmes, Mickey basically playing the part of Dr. Watson. Like his literary counterpart, he also plays the violin (albeit horribly). Unlike Sherlock Holmes, he is totally hopeless as a detective, sometimes unable to figure out crimes committed right in front of his eyes. Nevertheless, he always manages to solve his cases – hence ensuring a reputation as a great investigator – either by sheer luck, or thanks to his foes' fecklessness or simply because Mickey Mouse does all the actual detective work for him. Apart from Mickey, no one seems to be aware of the Sleuth's utter incompetence.

The characters of The Sleuth and Professor Nefarious, complete with the University of Criminal Sciences and the henchman Fliplip, were portrayed in an extended sketch in an episode of The New Mickey Mouse Club in 1978. Two Mouseketeer cast members – Lisa Whelchel as the Sleuth's niece Lisa, and Scott Craig as Fliplip – performed alongside the two lead rivals, using puppetry and ventriloquism skills. The setting of the story was England, near the White Cliffs of Dover.

=== Ellroy ===
Ellroy (original Italian name Bruto Gancetto) is an anthropomorphic mynah bird and Ellsworth's adoptive son. He was created by Romano Scarpa in the story Topolino e il rampollo di Gancio (Topolino n°1048, 1975). After adopting Ellroy, Ellsworth entrusted him to Mickey Mouse. Ellroy went on to be Mickey Mouse's sidekick in numerous Italian comics stories by Scarpa and other authors. Like Ellsworth, Ellroy can fly by using his arms like wings. Ellsworth and Ellroy look very much alike – Ellroy being somewhat smaller – and have appeared together in relatively few stories: this has caused confusion between the two characters among readers and translators. Ellroy first appeared in American comic books in 2016.

=== Zapotec and Marlin ===
Professor Zachary Zapotec and Dr. Spike Marlin are two Italian dogface characters created by Massimo De Vita. They are scientists from the Mouseton science museum. They are the inventors of a time machine which sends Mickey and Goofy on adventures in the past. Zapotec first appeared in "Topolino e l'enigma di Mu" in 1979 and Marlin first appeared in "Topolino e il segreto della Gioconda" in 1985. They also frequently argue but always forgive each other by the end. So far, they have only appeared in a handful of stories in the US.

=== Zenobia ===
Zenobia is a character created by Romano Scarpa, first appearing in the 1983 story "The African Queen", being the ruler of an African state, and leaving the throne to follow Goofy to the United States after having fallen in love with him. Scarpa's intention was to create a new girlfriend for Goofy, capable of bringing out the best in him.

In her stories with Goofy, he seems "more serious" and less inclined to follow Mickey on his adventures. Perhaps this was the reason that would push Scarpa to abandon Zenobia's participation in the stories: in the story "Ciao Minnotchka" (1993), after a trip to France with Mickey's gang, Zenobia announces that she will stay in Paris to help the ex-king of Selvanja, Ilja Topòvich, to run a hotel, as there is an attraction between the former rulers, and Goofy can't help but agree. But Zenobia has never forgotten Goofy, as shown in "Miseria e nobiltà" (1993) by Lello Arena, Francesco Artibani and Giorgio Cavazzano; after having performed at the theater, Goofy finds in her dressing room a bouquet of flowers with the dedication: "You are always the best. Zenobia."

Subsequently, Zenobia reappeared in various stories since 2013.

=== Doc Static ===
Doc Static is an overweight, clean-shaven inventor with a lab coat, wavy hair and glasses who appears in Egmont comic stories. He serves the same role in Mickey stories that Gyro Gearloose or Ludwig Von Drake have for Donald and Scrooge.

Doc Static first appeared in Plastic Mickey! in 1995.

=== Brick Boulder ===
Brick Boulder (original Italian name "Rock Sassi", which is a pleonasm as "sassi" means "rocks") is a plainclothes police officer who usually works together with Detective Casey. He first appeared in the story La lunga notte del commissario Manetta (English title: Casey's Longest Night) in 1997, written by Tito Faraci and drawn by Giorgio Cavazzano .

Like Casey, Brick Boulder is a bumbling and incompetent policeman. Curiously though, his intelligence seems to vary, even between stories by the same writer. He is physically more robust than the overweight Casey and likes to dress flashily, often wearing cowboy boots, a stetson and a bolo tie. He has been said to be a parody of Ronald Reagan and Arnold Schwarzenegger, the latter aspect being particularly obvious in his first appearance, but later toned down.

Brick Boulder is from Texas, United States. In one story, it was revealed that his entire family consists of criminals. Despite this, Brick Boulder is law-abiding and has wanted to be a policeman since his early childhood, much to the disappointment of his family. Another quirk is that he is afraid of alligators, as shown in the story "Topolino e lo strano caso di Jack Due di Cuori".

=== Duffy the Disney Bear ===
Duffy is a teddy bear available at Disney Parks. He was given a backstory in which Minnie Mouse sewed him for Mickey as he was leaving for a voyage at sea.

=== Eurasia Toft ===
Eurasia Toft ("Eurasia Tost" in Italian) is an adventurer and archaeologist, and a friend of Mickey and Goofy. Her first appearance happened in the 2003 story "The Lost Explorers' Trail", written by Casty (who also created the character) and drawn by Giorgio Cavazzano. She is a strong-willed character and can react very impulsively. Fans have likened her to Arizona Goof, though she has fewer personality quirks. Her name and character parody both Indiana Jones as well as Lara Croft (her Greek name is "Clara Loft"). Ever since the end of "Shadow of the Colossus", she has been obsessed with Atlantis; in her quest for the lost continent, she has repeatedly confronted a secret society called "Horde of the Violet Hare" (also created by Casty), who want to use Atlantean technology for their own goals.

=== Cuckoo-Loca ===
Cuckoo-Loca is a small yellow cuckoo from a cuckoo clock with a pink bow on her head and a tail in the shape of a clock key that, when spun, allows her to fly. She was introduced in the television series Minnie's Bow-Toons (2011) working in Minnie's boutique with her and Daisy.

After that, she became a frequent character in the series and productions derived from it, appearing in the series Mickey Mouse Mixed-Up Adventures (2017) as one of the main characters in the stories centered on Minnie and Daisy, helping them with their orders. She subsequently appeared as a recurring character in the series Mickey Mouse Funhouse (2021) and Mickey Mouse Clubhouse+ (2025). In 2021 she appeared in the Halloween TV special Mickey's Tale of Two Witches, and in the same year in the Christmas special Mickey and Minnie Wish Upon a Christmas.

In the stop motion TV special Mickey Saves Christmas (2022), Cuckoo-Loca makes a cameo appearance, with a figurine of her emerging from the cuckoo clock in Santa's workshop.

"Loca" being the Spanish word for "Crazy", her name is probably a reference to when people compare someone who is considered crazy to a cuckoo.

== Non-anthropomorphic supporting characters ==
=== Beppo the Gorilla ===
Beppo is a gorilla who first appeared in the short film The Gorilla Mystery (1930), where he escapes from the zoo and kidnaps Minnie, finally getting Mickey to rescue her and returning Beppo to the zoo. He reappeared in the short film Mickey's Mechanical Man (1933) as "The Kongo Killer", where he faces Champ, the mechanical man created by Mickey, in a boxing championship. His third and final appearance in a short film was in The Pet Store (1933), as a gorilla in a pet store, where he kidnaps Minnie in King Kong style.

Beppo appears in the video game Epic Mickey (2010) fighting in a boxing ring against Champ just like in Mickey's Mechanical Man. In the video game Kingdom Hearts III (2019), Beppo appears as an enemy in the "Mickey's Mechanical Man" minigame, based on in the short film of the same name.

=== Tanglefoot ===
Tanglefoot is Mickey's broken-down but loyal horse, introduced in a 1933 comic strip storyline, Mickey Mouse and His Horse Tanglefoot. The horse character returned in two more stories and was so popular at the time that in 1934 Western Publishing released six Big Little Books related to Tanglefoot.

=== Fifi the Peke ===
Fifi the Peke is Minnie's "prize pooch" and Pluto's girlfriend. In one cartoon (Pluto's Quin-puplets) Pluto and Fifi even had five puppies together. One of them was eventually named Pluto Junior. Later on, Fifi was replaced as Pluto's girlfriend by Dinah the Dachshund. Fifi disappeared from animation, but she did appear in the line of merchandise called "Minnie 'n Me" as Minnie's dog. She eventually returned to animation in the Mickey Mouse episode "You, Me and Fifi", and later appeared in Chip 'n' Dale: Park Life where her vocal effects are provided by Cindy Lee Delong. In the video game Disney Magic Kingdoms, Fifi appears as a playable character to unlock for a limited time.

=== Bobo the Elephant ===
Bobo is a baby elephant who has appeared as a pet of Mickey Mouse in at least two stories. He was first featured in a self-titled storyline in the Mickey Mousenewspaper comic strip. In the story, Mickey mistakenly purchases Bobo at an auction. Eli Squinch, also making his first appearance in that story, convinces Mickey that he is Bobo's rightful owner. However, Eli actually intends to use Bobo to run his sawmill to save on electricity, using a treadmill which had already killed two horses. Mickey and Horace Horsecollar stall Eli's repossession of Bobo until the baby pachyderm discovers his mother is in a visiting circus. Bobo runs away and is reunited with his mother.

Bobo's only animated appearance was in 1936's Mickey's Elephant. He is given to Mickey by the Rajah of Gahboon. Disney had planned to make Bobo into a recurring character, but nothing ever came of the idea. Storyboard sketches of a planned cartoon featuring Bobo, titled Spring Cleaning, were printed in the book Mickey Mouse: The Floyd Gottfredson Library – Volume 3: Showdown at Inferno Gulch. Bobo returned in the Mickey Mouse episode "Safari, So Good".

=== Figaro ===
Figaro is Minnie's pet cat who first appeared in Disney's animated film Pinocchio. He sometimes gets along with Pluto. He starred three solo cartoons, including Figaro and Cleo (1943), Bath Day (1946) and Figaro and Frankie (1947), that were not financially successful.

=== Butch the Bulldog ===
Butch (left) along with Pluto in his debut in Bone Trouble

Butch the Bulldog is Pluto's nemesis. He first appeared in the film Bone Trouble (1940), where Pluto tried to steal his bone. Ever since then, Butch has been antagonizing Pluto. Sometimes, Butch competes with Pluto for the affections of Dinah the Dachshund. At one point, Butch even antagonized Figaro the Kitten (Figaro and Frankie, 1947).

The rest of his filmography includes T-Bone for Two (1942), Canine Casanova (1945), Pluto's Kid Brother (1946), The Purloined Pup (1946), Pluto's Housewarming (1947), Pluto's Purchase (1948), Pluto's Sweater (1949), Pluto's Heart Throb (1950), and Wonder Dog (1950). His owner never appeared in the short films. Butch's vocal effects in these shorts are provided by Jimmy MacDonald.

Butch appears in the "Robocat" episode of Chip 'n Dale: Rescue Rangers voiced by Jim Cummings. This version can speak in a gangster accent and assists the Rescue Rangers when dealing with Fat Cat's gang.

Butch is also a recurring character in the television series Mickey Mouse Works and House of Mouse with his vocal effects provided by Frank Welker. He appears as a rival to Pluto in the cartoons starring him.

In Mickey Mouse Clubhouse and Mickey Mouse Mixed-Up Adventures, Pete is shown as Butch's owner and is depicted with brown fur. Butch's vocal effects are also provided by Frank Welker here.

Butch appears in Chip 'n' Dale: Park Life with his vocal effects provided by David Gasman.

=== Salty the Seal ===
Salty the Seal is a seal who shows up in typical seal locations (the circus, the beach, the zoo, the Arctic) and annoys Pluto into chasing him, causing Pluto to get into dangerous predicaments. Salty typically saves him, leading Salty and Pluto to become best friends—until Salty's next appearance, when the cycle begins again. Salty's debut was in Pluto's Playmate (1942), later returning in Rescue Dog (1947) and the particularly famous Mickey and the Seal (1948). Salty also has appearances in the television series Mickey Mouse Works, House of Mouse and Mickey Mouse Clubhouse.

=== Dinah the Dachshund ===
Dinah the Dachshund appears as Pluto's girlfriend although she sometimes dates Butch the Bulldog as well. She first appears in The Sleepwalker. In Canine Casanova, when she winds up in the dog pound, Pluto saves the day, becomes Dinah's hero and the two start dating. In other cartoons such as In Dutch, Pluto's Heart Throb and Wonder Dog, the two engage in further romance, often with Butch the Bulldog as Pluto's romantic rival.

Dinah has more recently appeared in several cartoon shorts in the anthology series Mickey Mouse Works and House of Mouse, where Pluto's Arrow Error shows Dinah as Butch's girlfriend first with no serious interest in Pluto.

=== Dolores the Elephant ===
Dolores the Elephant is an Asian elephant belonging to Goofy. She debuted in the short film Tiger Trouble (1945), serving as a mount to Goofy during a tiger hunt. She appeared a second time in The Big Wash (1948), as a circus elephant that Goofy was trying to give a bath. Her third and last appearance in a short film was in Working for Peanuts (1953), as an elephant in a zoo from whom Chip and Dale try to steal her peanuts, and Donald, who was her caretaker, tried to stop the chipmunks.

Dolores was named after Walt Disney's secretary, Dolores Voght.

=== Bent-Tail the Coyote ===
Bent-Tail the Coyote is a desert coyote and an opponent against Pluto. He always tries to get some food which Pluto is guarding (mostly livestock), but fails every time. He made his first appearance in The Legend of Coyote Rock trying to get at a flock of sheep. From the second short Sheep Dog onward he has a son who works with him. His last two starring shorts are Pests of the West and Camp Dog. An older version of Bent-Tail later appeared in the Walt Disney presents episode "The Coyote's Lament", where he teaches his grandson (who is the offspring of Bent-Tail's son) how humans and dogs have put a coyote's life in misery. Bent-Tail and his son also appeared in several Disney comics.

=== Pflip ===
Pflip is Eega Beeva's pet "thnuckle-booh", a mixture of dog, cat, hippopotamus, unicorn, llama, rabbit, and possibly other animals as well. He has a color warning system that turns red to warn Eega of certain danger.

=== Louie the Mountain Lion ===
Louie the Mountain Lion is a mountain lion who appears as an occasional antagonist of Goofy and Donald. He is usually depicted in Donald Duck and Goofy shorts, in which he often chases after the main characters in an attempt to eat them. Unlike most Disney cartoon characters, Louie does not speak, but instead makes grunting or growling sounds representing satisfaction, disapproval, or anxiety. He is also shown to care deeply about food and is rather intelligent when it comes to planning schemes to obtain things he wants, though his attempts to execute his plans often end in comical failures.

Louie's first appearance was in Lion Around where he attempts to eat Donald. In Hook, Lion and Sinker, he is revealed to have a son. He later rivals Goofy in Lion Down and Father's Lion. Louie again encounters Donald in Grand Canyonscope which reveals he is at least 90 years old (having been seen in the Grand Canyon during the US Civil War), in this short he acts as an antagonist towards both Donald and J. Audubon Woodlore.

He also appears as a recurring character in Mickey Mouse Works and House of Mouse.

His classification as a non-anthropomorphic character may be debated, as he speaks in some comics.

=== Milton the Cat ===
Milton the Cat is a red ginger Siamese cat and a rival of Pluto. He often competes with Pluto for food. He made his first appearance in the short Puss Cafe (1950) with his pal Richard. He next appears in the short Plutopia (1951) where he talks in Pluto's dream, voiced by Jim Backus. He made a final appearance in the short Cold Turkey (1951) fighting with Pluto for a roast turkey but both of them ended up with nothing.

== Characters from the Donald Duck universe ==
Donald Duck was a frequent supporting character in Mickey Mouse cartoons and comics until the 1940s. Since then, characters from the Duck universe have been making occasional appearances in Mickey Mouse stories, among them the most common being:

Donald Duck
Mickey's temperamental, and often selfish friend who dresses as a sailor and speaks with a semi-unintelligible voice.

Daisy Duck
Donald's girlfriend, with an equally dangerous temper but a much more sophisticated mien. She is best friends with Minnie.

Scrooge McDuck
Donald Duck's wealthy uncle who is the richest duck in the world. He lives in the city of Duckburg and is of Scottish descent.

Ludwig Von Drake
Donald Duck's eccentric uncle who is a resident scientist, lecturer, and psychiatrist. He was introduced in 1961, as part of Walt Disney's NBC television special.

Huey, Dewey, and Louie
Mischief-makers to provoke Donald's famous temper, later appearances showed them to be heroes in their own right and valuable assets to him and Scrooge on their adventures.

== Ajax name brand ==
Ajax, sometimes called the Ajax Corporation, is a name brand which makes several appearances in Mickey Mouse stories. An early example is in Lonesome Ghosts (1937) where Mickey, Donald and Goofy work for Ajax Ghost Exterminators. Other examples include Ajax Locksmiths, Ajax Door Fixers, Ajax Hairbow Wear Sale and Ajax Lost and Found. The name Ajax Corporation makes many appearances in the television series Mickey Mouse Works and House of Mouse. It is roughly equivalent to Warner Bros.' Acme brand. It bears no relationship to either the real-world Ajax company, a manufacturer of railroad car brake equipment, or the Ajax line of household cleaning products made and marketed by Colgate-Palmolive company, and pre-dates the introduction of Ajax cleanser by Colgate-Palmolive in 1947.

- In Frank Duck Brings 'Em Back Alive (1946), Donald works for the Ajax Circus.
- In Donald's Dream Voice (1948), Donald takes Ajax Voice Pills.
- The Little House (1952) features a company called Ajax Wrecking – Moving.
- In the Disneyland episode "Duck for Hire" (1957), Donald Duck visits the Ajax Employment Agency.

== See also ==
- Donald Duck universe
- List of Donald Duck universe characters
- List of Mickey Mouse universe media
- Julius the Cat
