= The Sleepwalker (1942 film) =

- Directed by: Clyde Geronimi
- Produced by: Walt Disney
- Starring: Pinto Colvig
- Music by: Oliver Wallace
- Color process: Technicolor
- Production company: Walt Disney Productions
- Distributed by: RKO Radio Pictures
- Release date: July 3, 1942 (USA)
- Running time: 7 min (one reel)
- Language: English

The Sleepwalker is a cartoon starring Mickey's dog Pluto. It was produced by Walt Disney Productions and released by RKO Radio Pictures in 1942. The short marks the debut of Dinah the Dachshund, who later appears (with a design change) in Canine Casanova (1945), In Dutch (1946), Pluto's Heart Throb (1950) and Wonder Dog (1950), becoming Pluto's recurring love interest.

== Plot ==
Pluto is seen, happily sleeping while licking his bone. Dinah the Dachshund (in her first cartoon appearance), watching from a hole in a fence also wants the bone too, so she sneaks up and carefully pulls away Pluto's bowl which contains the bone from him and takes it herself. Pluto's tongue detects that the bone is gone before he wakes up and is shocked to see that Dinah is licking his bone. Furious, Pluto chases after Dinah through the neighbourhood and takes the bone back.

Soon after, Pluto goes back to sleep and soon begins sleepwalking and, while in this state, gives his bone to Dinah, but every time he wakes up, he thinks she has stolen it again, and angrily takes it back. Pluto finally snaps when he catches her trying to bury the bone, and not only chases her back to her doghouse, but also destroys the house in rage.

It is here that Pluto makes a shocking discovery, Dinah has puppies, and they now have no shelter. Overcome with guilt for his actions, Pluto quickly gives Dinah and her puppies his doghouse to stay in, along with a pile of his bones. Grateful, Dinah gives Pluto a kiss, and an overjoyed Pluto happily goes back to sleep in the rain.

== Voice cast ==
- Pluto: Pinto Colvig

== Releases ==
- 1942 - theatrical release
- c. 1992 - Mickey's Mouse Tracks, episode #42 (TV)
- c. 1992 - Donald's Quack Attack, episode #43 (TV)
- 1997 - The Ink and Paint Club, episode #1.12: "The Many Loves of Pluto" (TV)

== Home media ==
The short was released on December 7, 2004, on Walt Disney Treasures: The Complete Pluto: 1930-1947.

Additional releases include:

- 1981 - "Mickey Mouse and Donald Duck Cartoon Collections Volume One" (VHS)
