= Boat Builders (film) =

1938 Mickey Mouse cartoon

- Directed by: Ben Sharpsteen
- Produced by: Walt Disney
- Music by: Leigh Harline; Oliver Wallace
- Animation by: Frenchy de Trémaudan; Louie Schmitt; Chuck Couch; Eddie Strickland; Clyde Geronimi; Paul Satterfield; Archie Robin; Don Patterson
- Production company: Walt Disney Productions
- Distributed by: RKO Radio Pictures
- Release date: February 25, 1938
- Running time: 7 minutes
- Country: United States
- Language: English

Boat Builders is an animated short film produced by Walt Disney, distributed by RKO Radio Pictures and released on February 25, 1938. The film was directed by Ben Sharpsteen. It was the 99th short in the Mickey Mouse film series to be released, and the first for that year.

== Plot ==
Mickey Mouse and his friends Donald Duck and Goofy look at a blueprint for a boat made by the Ready-Cut Folding Boat Company (the instructions simply say "All you do is put it together" and "Even a child can do it"). After looking at the blueprints, the trio decide to name the boat the Queen Minnie.

First, the three open a box containing the boat's keel. Afterwards, Mickey encourages the trio to pull a rope to unfold the keel, but when they attempt to get out of the way, the keel catches them (where they repeat the phrases on the blueprint).

Mickey places a rectangular box which houses the boat's mast on a slot shaped like the box. He opens it and stands on the mast to pull it up (despite the blueprint warning against standing on the mast while setting it up). The mast stretches up to the sky, with Mickey on it.

As Mickey and Donald set up the boat's deckhouse, Goofy hammers in boards at the bow. As he tries to place another one, the board he hammered in springs out to hit him in the back of his head. Making an angry glare, Goofy hammers the board back in, only for another board to spring out and hit him. Goofy hammers the board back to its regular position, but while he tries to get more nails, the board hits him off the dock, where he lands rear end first onto a barrel of nails. As Goofy gets his hat, he reads the word on the barrel and, realizing it contains nails, yelps and jumps up high, where he grabs onto the boat's stem.

Donald sits on a board suspended from the boat's stern as he paints the rudder using red paint. Mickey attaches the ship's wheel to the helm and turns it, which turns the rudder. Confused upon seeing this, Donald grabs the rudder to try to keep it still while he paints it, which also gives Mickey trouble attempting to turn the ship's wheel. The seat gets wrapped around the rudder, and it hits Donald like a paddle ball toy. The ship's wheel spins out of control, and so does the rudder, causing Donald's seat to get tangled around the rudder. Donald's paintbrush then strikes him in the beak, giving him the appearance of having a mustache.

Goofy places a box containing the boat's figurehead and opens it. When he sees its appearance (a mermaid), he thinks the figurehead is a real woman. He then makes gestures to the figurehead, but when it falls, Goofy believes that it fainted and props it up on a chair. He kisses the figurehead and gets sent into a lovestruck state, where he dances to a crate and lies down on it. After Mickey takes the figurehead to bring it to the bow, Goofy notices that it is absent. As Mickey brings the figurehead to the bow, its tailfin gets caught on the boat's whistle cord, which sounds the whistle. Goofy mistakes the whistling for the "lady" calling out to him. As he goes to hug the "lady", he hugs the funnel, causing it to rattle violently and send Goofy into a panicked frenzy where he lands on the boat's anchor. As his clothes hang on the anchor, Goofy gives his thoughts on the "lady".

During a ceremony to celebrate the maiden voyage of the Queen Minnie, Mickey, Donald, and Goofy are dressed up as sailors while "Anchors Aweigh" is played by a brass band. Mickey orders Minnie Mouse to christen the boat using a champagne bottle, and she does so. However, Minnie appears to have hit the boat a little too hard to get her to set sail, causing the Queen Minnie to fall apart. The three float on parts of the boat while Mickey repeats the line "All you do is put it together", though Donald then tells him "Ah, phooey!"

== Voice cast ==
- Mickey Mouse: Walt Disney
- Donald Duck: Clarence Nash
- Goofy: Pinto Colvig
- Minnie Mouse: Leone Ledoux

== Releases ==
- 1938 - original theatrical release
- 1957 - The Mickey Mouse Club, episode #3.24 (TV)
- c. 1972 - The Mouse Factory, episode #1.7: "Water Sports" (TV)
- c. 1983 - Good Morning, Mickey!, episode #1 (TV)
- 1989 - The Magical World of Disney, episode #33.15: "Mickey's Happy Valentine Special" (TV)
- c. 1992 - Mickey's Mouse Tracks, episode #16 (TV)
- c. 1992 - Donald's Quack Attack, episode #34 (TV)
- 1998 - The Ink and Paint Club, episode #39: "Minnie Mouse" (TV)
- 2007 - reissued with 2D version of Meet the Robinsons (theatrical)
- 2011 - Have a Laugh!, episode #25 (TV)

== Home media ==
The short was released on December 4, 2001, on Walt Disney Treasures: Mickey Mouse in Living Color.

Additional releases include:

- 1981 - "Mickey Mouse and Donald Duck Cartoon Collections Volume Three" (VHS)
- 1989 - "Cartoon Classics: Mickey and the Gang" (VHS)
- 2018 - Celebrating Mickey (Blu-ray/DVD/Digital)

== See also ==
- Mickey Mouse (film series)
