= Lend a Paw =

1941 Mickey Mouse cartoon

- Theatrical release poster
- Directed by: Clyde Geronimi; Assisted by: Don A. Duckwall (uncredited)
- Produced by: Walt Disney
- Starring: Teddy Barr; Walt Disney; John Dehner; John McLeish; Marcellite Garner
- Music by: Leigh Harline
- Animation by: Uncredited character animation: George Nicholas; Kenneth Muse; Nick Nichols; William Sturm; Eric Gurney; Norman Tate; Chick Otterstrom; Morey Reden; Emery Hawkins
- Layouts by: Uncredited: Bruce Bushman
- Color process: Technicolor
- Production company: Walt Disney Productions
- Distributed by: RKO Radio Pictures
- Release date: October 3, 1941
- Running time: 8:12
- Country: United States
- Language: English

Lend a Paw is an animated short film produced in Technicolor by Walt Disney Productions, distributed by RKO Radio Pictures and released to theaters on October 3, 1941. Lend a Paw was directed by Clyde Geronimi and features original music by Leigh Harline. George Nicholas, Kenneth Muse, Nick Nichols, William Sturm, Eric Gurney, Norman Tate, Chick Otterstrom, Morey Reden, and Emery Hawkins animated the film. The voice cast includes Walt Disney as Mickey and Teddy Barr as Pluto. It was the 115th short in the Mickey Mouse film series to be released, and the sixth for that year.

In the cartoon, which was largely a remake of the 1933 short Mickey's Pal Pluto, Pluto saves the life of a kitten, and later feels jealous towards the kitten after Mickey Mouse takes the kitten in. The film won the Academy Award for Best Animated Short Film at the 14th Academy Awards in 1942, the only Mickey Mouse short to win the award.

== Plot ==
While out in the snow, Pluto hears meowing from a bag floating on a drifting ice floe. He saves it, only to lose interest when he finds a kitten inside. The kitten follows him home and gets adopted by Mickey. Pluto becomes jealous of all the attention the kitten gets and is urged by his shoulder devil to get the kitten in trouble. Pluto's shoulder angel attempts to talk him out of it, but the devil gets rid of the angel by jabbing him with his trident. To get the kitten into trouble, Pluto lifts the kitten within reach of Mickey's goldfish Bianca, only for it to drag the fishbowl off the edge of the table. The devil warns Pluto to run, but he fails to get away in time as the kitten, fishbowl, and a lamp fall onto him. The loud noise gets Mickey's attention and he demands answers from Bianca, who angrily fingers Pluto as the culprit, knowing that he was trying to get the kitten in trouble in the first place, to the latter's horror. Mickey angrily kicks a guilty Pluto out of the house as punishment for the mess he made, and Pluto blames his shoulder devil for getting him in trouble.

The kitten chases a ball outside and accidentally falls into a well. The angel tells Pluto to save it, but the devil tells him to let it drown as revenge for getting him kicked out and silences the angel by trapping him in his halo and punching him out. Roused by the kitten's cries, the angel, fed up with the devil, steps on the devil's tail and punches him into oblivion, convincing Pluto to extract the kitten using the well's bucket. In the process, Pluto slips and falls in the well, saving the kitten. Hearing Pluto's howl, Mickey pulls him out, but finds him frozen in a block of ice. He rams him into the well's top to break the ice and then brings Pluto inside. After receiving a hot bath from Mickey and a grateful lick from the kitten, Pluto pants contentedly and is told by the angel, "Kindness to animals, my friend, will be rewarded in the end."

== Voice cast ==
- Mickey Mouse: Walt Disney
- Pluto: Teddy Barr & Pinto Colvig
- Pluto's angel: John McLeish
- Pluto's devil: John Dehner
- Kitten: Marcellite Garner

== Releases ==
- 1941 - theatrical release
- 1954 - Disneyland, episode #1.6: "A Story of Dogs" (TV)
- c. 1972 - The Mouse Factory, episode #29: "Consciences" (TV)
- c. 1992 - Mickey's Mouse Tracks, episode #67 (TV)
- c. 1992 - Donald's Quack Attack, episode #15 (TV)
- 1993 - The Adventures of Mickey and Donald, episode #1 (TV)

== Home media ==
The short was released on December 7, 2004, on Walt Disney Treasures: The Complete Pluto: 1930-1947.

Additional releases include:

- 1981 - "Mickey Mouse and Donald Duck Cartoon Collections Volume Three" (VHS)
- 1998 - "The Spirit of Mickey" (VHS)
- c. 2002 - bonus on Oliver & Company (DVD/VHS, only in USA/Canada)
- 2005 - "Classic Cartoon Favorites: Holiday Celebration with Mickey and Pals" (DVD)
- 2006 - bonus on The Fox and the Hound (25th anniversary edition DVD)
- 2009 - bonus on Oliver & Company (20th anniversary edition DVD)
- 2013 - bonus on Oliver & Company (25th anniversary edition Blu-ray)

It is also available on Disney+.

== See also ==
- Mickey Mouse (film series)
