= Pluto's Blue Note =

1947 Pluto cartoon

- Directed by: Charles A. Nichols
- Written by: Milt Schaffer; Jack Huber
- Produced by: Walt Disney
- Starring: Billy Bletcher; Pinto Colvig; John Woodbury
- Music by: Oliver Wallace
- Production company: Walt Disney Productions
- Distributed by: RKO Radio Pictures
- Release date: December 26, 1947
- Country: United States
- Language: English

Pluto’s Blue Note is a 1947 animated short film produced by Walt Disney Productions that stars Pluto. The film was nominated for the 1948 Academy Award for Best Animated Short Film but lost to Warner Bros. Cartoons' Tweetie Pie.

== Plot ==
Pluto wakes up to the sound of two birds singing. He tries to sing along with them but is unsuccessful, causing them to fly away annoyed. Pluto also tries to imitate the sound of a bee and cricket, but he annoys them as well, prompting the bee to hide in the flower that it was on and the cricket to jump into a hole. Pluto then hears the sound of a radio beating at a nearby music store and discovers that he can emulate it by pounding his tail on the ground. However, the store proprietor turns it off and takes it inside just as Pluto begins enjoying himself. Seeing it in the back of the store, Pluto attempts to sneak inside to play the radio some more, but at one point, he had to hide when the proprietor comes by. As the proprietor puts an "Out to Lunch" sign on the door, he closes the door behind him and leaves. With the store now left unoccupied, Pluto safely approaches the radio, but when he turns it on, no music plays. He accidentally turns on a record player and discovers that his tail can function like a record player's stylus, to which music comes out of his mouth when his tail is on the spinning record. Pluto then decides to take the record player back to his doghouse to play music with it. As the record player plays a song, he mimics the singing voice coming from the record player to make it look like he's the one singing. His tactic gets the attention of a group of female dogs (with Fifi and Dinah being among them), as well as the birds, bee, and cricket that he previously annoyed, who are all very impressed by his "singing". Close to the end, his tail comes out the record player, which causes the song to get stuck and prompting him to quickly put his tail back on the record as he finishes the song, causing the female dogs to faint from a happy shock.

== Home media ==
The short was released on December 19, 2006 on Walt Disney Treasures: The Complete Pluto, Volume Two.

It was also released on the Walt Disney's Classic Cartoon Favorites DVD.
