= Walt Disney Cartoon Classics =

Disney cartoon compilation

Walt Disney Cartoon Classics is a video series of Disney cartoon compilations that ran from 1983 to 1996, thus being significantly longer-lived than its predecessor, Mickey Mouse and Donald Duck Cartoon Collections.

== Wave One ==
The first 14 volumes, from 1983 to 1986, came with six or seven cartoons and ran from 30–60 minutes. The titles of all 14 volumes and their cartoons are as follows.

=== Chip 'N' Dale with Donald Duck (1983) ===
1. Chip an' Dale (1947)
2. Winter Storage (1949)
3. Up a Tree (1955)
4. Three for Breakfast (1948)
5. Out on a Limb (1950)
6. Corn Chips (1951)
7. Out of Scale (1951)

=== Pluto (1983) ===
1. Pluto's Fledgling (1948)
2. The Pointer (1939)
3. The Legend of Coyote Rock (1945)
4. In Dutch (1946)
5. Private Pluto (1943)
6. Bone Trouble (1940)
7. Camp Dog (1950)

=== Scary Tales (1983) ===
1. Donald Duck and the Gorilla (1944)
2. Duck Pimples (1945)
3. The Skeleton Dance (1929)
4. The Haunted House (1929)
5. Donald's Lucky Day (1939)
6. Pluto's Judgement Day (1935)

=== Sport Goofy (1983) ===
1. The Olympic Champ (1942)
2. Goofy Gymnastics (1949)
3. How to Play Baseball (1942)
4. How to Play Golf (1944)
5. Tennis Racquet (1949)
6. Hockey Homicide (1945)

=== Disney's Best of 1931-1948 (1983) ===
1. The Ugly Duckling (1939)
2. Mickey's Orphans (1931)
3. Flowers and Trees (1932)
4. Truant Officer Donald (1941)
5. The Country Cousin (1936)
6. Mickey and the Seal (1948)

=== More Sport Goofy (1983) ===
1. How to Play Football (1944)
2. The Art of Self Defense (1941)
3. The Art of Skiing (1941)
4. How to Ride a Horse (1941)
5. How to Swim (1942)
6. Double Dribble (1946)

Note: This is the only Cartoon Classics video to not be released on VHS. This video is a laserdisc reissue of an older VHS from 1981, entitled Goofy Over Sports.

=== More of Disney's Best: 1932-1946 (1984) ===
1. Three Little Pigs (1933)
2. Brave Little Tailor (1938)
3. The Old Mill (1937)
4. Donald's Crime (1945)
5. The Tortoise and the Hare (1935)
6. Squatter's Rights (1946)

=== Sport Goofy's Vacation (1984) ===
1. Two Weeks Vacation (1952)
2. Father's Lion (1952)
3. Foul Hunting (1947)
4. How to Fish (1942)
5. Tiger Trouble (1945)
6. Aquamania (1961)

=== Donald Duck's First 50 Years (1984) ===
1. The Wise Little Hen (1934)
2. Donald and Pluto (1936)
3. Don Donald (1937)
4. Donald's Nephews (1938)
5. Donald's Double Trouble (1946)
6. Rugged Bear (1953)

=== Mickey's Crazy Careers (1984) ===
1. Mickey's Fire Brigade (1935)
2. The Band Concert (1935)
3. The Mail Pilot (1933)
4. Magician Mickey (1937)
5. Clock Cleaners (1937)
6. Tugboat Mickey (1940)

=== The Continuing Adventures of Chip 'N' Dale Featuring Donald Duck (1985) ===
1. All in a Nutshell (1949)
2. Test Pilot Donald (1951)
3. Modern Inventions (1937)
4. Food for Feudin' (1950)
5. Old Sequoia (1945)
6. The Flying Jalopy (1943)
7. Toy Tinkers (1949)

=== Disney's Tall Tales (1986) ===
1. Casey at the Bat (1946)
2. The Saga of Windwagon Smith (1961)
3. A Cowboy Needs a Horse (1956)
4. The Golden Touch (1935)
5. The Brave Engineer (1950)
6. The Big Bad Wolf (1934)

=== Silly Symphonies: Fanciful Fables (1986) ===
1. The Merry Dwarfs (1929)
2. Playful Pan (1930)
3. Babes in the Woods (1932)
4. Father Noah's Ark (1933)
5. The Goddess of Spring (1934)
6. Little Hiawatha (1937)

=== Silly Symphonies: Animal Tales (1986) ===
1. Monkey Melodies (1930)
2. The Spider and the Fly (1931)
3. Peculiar Penguins (1934)
4. Cock o' the Walk (1935)
5. More Kittens (1936)
6. Elmer Elephant (1936)

== Limited Gold Editions ==
In 1984 and 1985, the "Limited Gold Editions" I and II came out with a historical introduction documentary to each video, like the first series, the second series had six or seven cartoons, but with the exceptions of "How the Best Was Won: 1933-1960", which had five cartoons, and "Disney's Best: The Fabulous '50s", which had four cartoons. LGE I videos all have the documentary about Walt Disney's early start and the first original Mickey Mouse. LGE II videos each have different documentaries focusing on histories of the specific characters/themes of the video. Including Mickey Mouse, Donald Duck, Goofy, Pluto, Disney's war cartoons, Silly Symphonies, and the Academy Award winning shorts. These historical introduction documentaries also include interviews with the likes of Jack Hannah, Clarence Nash, Jack Kinney, and archival footage of Walt Disney himself. In 1986, the "Limited Gold Editions I" were released on VHS in the United Kingdom, and laserdisc only in Japan, CAV, and bilingual. The 14 titles are as follows:

=== Limited Gold Edition I ===
==== Mickey (1984) ====
1. Steamboat Willie (1928)
2. Mickey's Grand Opera (1936)
3. The Worm Turns (1937)
4. Mickey's Parrot (1938)
5. Mr. Mouse Takes a Trip (1940)
6. Symphony Hour (1942)
7. The Simple Things (1953)

==== Minnie (1984) ====
1. Plane Crazy (1928)
2. Mickey's Rival (1936)
3. First Aiders (1944)
4. The Nifty Nineties (1941)
5. Bath Day (1946)
6. Mickey's Delayed Date (1947)
7. Figaro and Frankie (1947)

==== Donald (1984) ====
1. Donald's Cousin Gus (1939)
2. The Riveter (1940)
3. The Autograph Hound (1939)
4. A Good Time for a Dime (1941)
5. Donald's Tire Trouble (1943)
6. Drip Dippy Donald (1948)
7. The New Neighbor (1953)

==== Daisy (1984) ====
1. Mr. Duck Steps Out (1940)
2. Cured Duck (1945)
3. Dumb Bell of the Yukon (1946)
4. Sleepy Time Donald (1947)
5. Donald's Dilemma (1947)
6. Donald's Dream Voice (1948)
7. Crazy Over Daisy (1950)

==== Pluto (1984) ====
1. Pluto Junior (1942)
2. Canine Casanova (1945)
3. Pluto at the Zoo (1942)
4. Pluto's Housewarming (1947)
5. Pluto's Heart Throb (1950)
6. Cat Nap Pluto (1948)
7. Wonder Dog (1950)

==== Silly Symphonies (1984) ====
1. Birds in the Spring (1933)
2. The China Shop (1934)
3. The Flying Mouse (1934)
4. The Cookie Carnival (1935)
5. Woodland Cafe (1937)
6. The Moth and the Flame (1938)
7. Farmyard Symphony (1938)

==== Disney's Best: The Fabulous '50s (1984) ====
1. Lambert the Sheepish Lion (1952)
2. Pigs Is Pigs (1954)
3. Toot, Whistle, Plunk and Boom (1953)
4. Noah's Ark (1959)

=== Limited Gold Edition II ===
==== Life with Mickey (1985) ====
1. Shanghaied (1934)
2. Mickey's Polo Team (1936)
3. Alpine Climbers (1936)
4. Mickey's Circus (1936)
5. Mickey Down Under (1948)
6. R'coon Dawg (1951)

==== Donald's Bee Pictures (1985) ====
1. Inferior Decorator (1948)
2. Honey Harvester (1949)
3. Slide, Donald, Slide (1949)
4. Window Cleaners (1940)
5. Tea for Two Hundred (1948) [some copies have Bee at the Beach (1949) instead, likely due to the original short's cultural stereotyping]
6. Bee on Guard (1951)
7. Let's Stick Together (1952)

==== The World According to Goofy (1985) ====
1. Goofy's Glider (1940)
2. Baggage Buster (1941)
3. How to Be a Sailor (1944)
4. They're Off (1948)
5. Home Made Home (1951)
6. Man's Best Friend (1952)
7. How to Dance (1953)

==== From Pluto With Love (1985) ====
1. Pluto's Playmate (1941)
2. T-Bone for Two (1942)
3. Rescue Dog (1947)
4. Pluto's Surprise Package (1949)
5. Sheep Dog (1949)
6. Cold Turkey (1951)
7. Plutopia (1951)

==== An Officer and a Duck (1985) ====
1. Donald Gets Drafted (1942)
2. The Vanishing Private (1942)
3. Sky Trooper (1942)
4. Fall Out Fall In (1943)
5. The Old Army Game (1943)
6. Home Defense (1943)

==== The Disney Dream Factory: 1933-1938 (1985) ====
1. Old King Cole (1933)
2. The Pied Piper (1933)
3. Music Land (1935)
4. Three Blind Mouseketeers (1936)
5. Merbabies (1938)
6. Wynken, Blynken, and Nod (1938)

==== How the Best Was Won: 1933-1960 (1985) ====
1. Building a Building (1933)
2. Funny Little Bunnies (1934)
3. Three Orphan Kittens (1935)
4. Ferdinand the Bull (1938)
5. Goliath II (1960)

== Wave Two ==
In 1987, another wave of "Cartoon Classics" was released, with 14 regular volumes, as well as four "Special Edition" volumes. Volumes 1-5 were released on May 19, 1987. Volumes 6-10 were released on October 6, 1987. Volumes 11 and 12 were released on May 9, 1989. Volumes 13 and 14 were released on August 28, 1990. The first "Special Edition" volume was released on October 4, 1988. Another three "Special Edition" volumes were released on June 19, 1992. The shorts featured on volumes 1-5 were all new-to-VHS in the United States and Canada at the time, while shorts featured on all subsequent volumes are duplicated from the earlier "Cartoon Classics" wave and other early Disney VHS releases. The sole exception is The Big Wash, which made its debut on Fun on the Job.

Between each short are clips from other cartoons, redubbed with new voices to link the featured cartoons together.

=== Vol. 1: Here's Mickey! ===
1. Mickey's Birthday Party (1942)
2. Orphan's Benefit (1941)
3. Mickey's Garden (1935)

Linking clips reused from: Mickey's Delayed Date (1947)

=== Vol. 2: Here's Donald! ===
1. Wide Open Spaces (1947)
2. Donald's Ostrich (1937)
3. Crazy with the Heat (1947)

Linking clips reused from: Baggage Buster (1941), Mickey's Trailer (1938)

=== Vol. 3: Here's Goofy! ===
1. For Whom the Bulls Toil (1953)
2. Lion Down (1951)
3. A Knight for a Day (1946)

Linking clips reused from: A Gentleman's Gentleman (1941), Brave Little Tailor (1938)

=== Vol. 4: Silly Symphonies! ===
1. Three Little Wolves (1936)
2. Toby Tortoise Returns (1936)
3. Water Babies (1935)

Linking clips reused from: Three Little Pigs (1933)

=== Vol. 5: Here's Pluto! ===
1. Mail Dog (1947)
2. Pantry Pirate (1940)
3. Springtime for Pluto (1944)

Linking clips reused from: A Gentleman's Gentleman (1941), Cold Turkey (1951)

=== Vol. 6: Starring Mickey & Minnie ===
1. The Little Whirlwind (1941)
2. Hawaiian Holiday (1937)
3. Brave Little Tailor (1938)

Linking clips reused from: The Simple Things (1953), The Nifty Nineties (1941)

=== Vol. 7: Starring Donald & Daisy ===
1. Don Donald (1937)
2. Donald's Double Trouble (1946)
3. Donald's Diary (1954)

Linking clips reused from: This Is Your Life, Donald Duck (1960)

=== Vol. 8: Starring Silly Symphonies: Animals Two by Two ===
1. Father Noah's Ark (1933)
2. Peculiar Penguins (1934)
3. The Tortoise and the Hare (1935)

Linking clips reused from: The Grasshopper and the Ants (1934)

=== Vol. 9: Starring Chip 'n' Dale ===
1. Working for Peanuts (1953)
2. Donald Applecore (1952)
3. Dragon Around (1954)

Linking clips reused from: This Is Your Life, Donald Duck (1960)

=== Vol. 10: Starring Pluto & Fifi ===
1. Society Dog Show (1939)
2. Pluto's Blue Note (1947)
3. Pluto's Quin-Puplets (1937)

Linking clips reused from: Pluto's Heart Throb (1950), Canine Casanova (1945)

=== Special Edition ===
1. Mickey and the Seal (1948)
2. Bubble Bee (1949)
3. Mickey's Trailer (1938)
4. All in a Nutshell (1949)

Linking clips reused from: The Pointer (1939), Mr. Mouse Takes a Trip (1940), Donald's Ostrich (1937), Chips Ahoy (1956)

=== Vol. 11: Starring Minnie & Figaro ===
1. Figaro and Cleo (1943)
2. Bath Day (1946)
3. Figaro and Frankie (1947)

Linking clips reused from: First Aiders (1944), Pluto's Sweater (1949)

=== Vol. 12: Mickey and the Gang ===
1. Boat Builders (1938)
2. Canine Caddy (1941)
3. Moose Hunters (1937)

Linking clips reused from: Pluto's Dream House (1940), How to Play Golf (1944), African Diary (1945)

=== Vol. 13: Nuts About Chip 'n' Dale ===
1. Two Chips and a Miss (1952)
2. Food for Feudin' (1950)
3. Trailer Horn (1950)

Linking clips reused from: Mickey's Amateurs (1937)

=== Vol. 14: Donald's Scary Tales ===
1. Donald Duck and the Gorilla (1944)
2. Duck Pimples (1945)
3. Donald's Lucky Day (1939)

Linking clips reused from: Mickey's Parrot (1938), Donald's Off Day (1944), The Plastics Inventor (1944)

=== Vol. 15: Halloween Haunts ===
1. Pluto's Judgement Day (1935)
2. Lonesome Ghosts (1937)
3. Trick or Treat (1952)

Linking clips reused from: The Worm Turns (1937), Daddy Duck (1948)

=== Special Edition - Fun on the Job! ===
1. Clock Cleaners (1937)
2. Baggage Buster (1941)
3. Mickey's Fire Brigade (1935)
4. The Big Wash (1948)

Linking clips reused from: Fathers Are People (1951), Fire Chief (1940), Motor Mania (1950)

=== Special Edition - Happy Summer Days ===
1. Father's Lion (1952)
2. Tea for Two Hundred (1948)
3. The Simple Things (1953)
4. Two Weeks Vacation (1952)

Linking clips reused from: Donald's Vacation (1940), How to Fish (1942), Lion Down (1951)

=== Special Edition - The Goofy World of Sports ===
1. The Olympic Champ (1942)
2. Donald's Golf Game (1938)
3. The Art of Skiing (1941)
4. Aquamania (1961)

Linking clips reused from: Goofy Gymnastics (1949), How to Play Golf (1944)

== Disney's Valentine Collection ==
- Love Tales (January 13, 1995)
- Mickey Loves Minnie (January 10, 1996)
- Sweetheart Stories (January 10, 1996)

== International versions ==
Some volumes in the series were released in different countries.

=== Germany ===
- Alle Enten Fertig...Los! (Going Quackers) (1984)
- Bum, Bum, Bumerang (Boom, Boom, Boomerang) (1984)
- Donald Duck in die Größte Show der Welt (Donald Duck in the Biggest Show in the World) (1984)
- Donald Duck Geht Nach Wildwest (Donald Duck Goes West) (1984)
- Donald 50 Verrückte Jahre (Donald: 50 Crazy Years) (1984)
- Donald Macht nie Pause (Donald Never Pauses) (1984)
- Donald Duck's Ferienabenteur (Donald Duck's Vacation Adventures) (1984)
- Donald Superstar and Co. (1984)
- Donald Total Verliebt (Donald's Totally in Love) (1984)
- Plutos Tollkühne Abenteur (Pluto's Daredevil Adventure) (1984)
- Donald und die Entenbande (Donald and the Ducks) (1985)
- Die Drei Kleinen Schweinchen und der Böse Wolf (The Three Little Pigs and the Big Bad Wolf) (1985)
- Lachkonzert in Entenhausen (1985)
- Donald Ich bin der Grösste (1985)
- Frohe Weihnachten mit MickyMaus und ihren Freunden (1985)
- Goofys Lustige Sportschau (1985)
- Micky's Lustige Abenteuer (1985)
- Pluto Held Wider Willen (1985)
- Walt Disneys Musikhitparade (1985)
- Melodie Tanz Rhythmus (Melody Time) (1987)
- Mickey, Donald und Goofy im Märchenland (1987)
- Mit Mir Nicht (1987)
- Die Popcornschlacht (1987)
- Verrückte Musikanten (1987)
- Donald Präsentiert (Donald Presents) (1990)
- Micky Präsentiert (Mickey Presents) (1990)
- Pluto Präsentiert (Pluto Presents) (1990)
- Micky und Company (Mickey and Company) (1991)
- Goofys Lustige Olympiade (1992)
- Meister-Cartoons von Walt Disney (1993)
- Happy Birthday, Pluto! (1995)
- Pluto Räumt Auf (Pluto Cleans Up) (1995)
- Zeitungsjunge Pluto (1995)
- Käpt'n Donald (Captain Donald) (1995)
- Swinging Micky (Swinging Mickey) (1995)
- Mickys Sommerspaß (Mickey's Summer Vacation) (1996)
- That's Donald (1996)
- Vorsicht Löwe! (Attention Lion!) (1996)
- Figaro und Cleo (Figaro and Cleo) (1997)
- Pluto auf der Jagd (1997)
- Micky im Siebten Himmel (January 20, 2000)

=== Italy ===
- Cartoons Disney 1 (1981)
- Cartoons Disney 2 (1981)
- Cartoons Disney 3 (1981)
- Saludos Amigos (1981)
- Pippo Olimpionico (1980)
- Buon Compleanno Topolino (1982)
- Winnie Puh Orsetto Ghiottone (1982)
- Pinocchio, DuckTales e... (1989)
- Bongo e i Tre Avventurieri (1982)
- I tre caballeros (1982)
- Musica Maestro (1983)
- Paperino nel mondo della Matemagica (1983)
- Il nostro amico atomo (1983)
- Nasce un nuovo mondo (1983)
- L'Asinello (sulla custodia data 1980)
- Paperino nel Far West (1983)
- Pippo, Pluto, Paperino Supershow (1984)
- Lo scrigno delle sette perle (1983)
- Troppo Vento Per Winnie Puh (1983)
- Buon compleanno Paperino (1983)
- Canto di Natale di Topolino (1983)
- Le Avventure di Pluto (1984)
- La storia di Paperino (1984)
- I Cattivi Disney (1983)
- Cani e simpatia (1983)
- Le avventure di Cip e Ciop (1984)
- Paperino e i racconti misteriosi (1983)
- Da Disney con amore (1983)
- Topolino (1984)
- Minni (1983)
- Paperino e la sua banda dei paperi (1984)
- Cartoons Disney 4 (1983)
- Paperino (1984)
- Pluto (1984)
- Cartoons Disney 5 (1983)
- Silly Symphonies (1984)
- Il meglio di Disney (1984)
- Le avventure di caccia del Prof. De Paperis (1985)
- Cartoons Disney 6 (1988)
- Vita da Paperi (1984)
- Come Divertirsti con Paperino &C. (1984)
- C'era una volta un Topo (1984)
- Winny Puh a Tu Per Tu (1985)
- Paperino Marmittone (1986)
- I Capolavori di Walt Disney (1986)
- Silly Symphonies Vol. 1 (1986)
- Le vacanze di Pippo (1984)
- Le Nuove Avventure di Pluto (1986)
- La vita con Topolino (1985)
- Il Mondo Di Pippo (1986)
- Paperino e le api (1985)
- Cartoni animati da Oscar (1985)
- Da tutti noi a tutti voi (1983)
- Le Meravigliose Fiabe del Grillo Parlante (1985)
- Da Pluto con amore (1985)
- Paperino & Soci a caccia di guai (1986)
- La fabbrica dei sogni Cod. VI 4161 (1985)
- I 50 anni folli di Paperino (1984)
- Pippo pasticci e simpatia (1985)
- Silly Symphonies vol. 2 (1981)
- Pippo nel pallone (1985)
- L'apprendista stregone (1987)
- Disney Adventures (1988)
- Paperino Pippo Pluto e ... (1988)
- Le Radici di Pippo (1988)
- Topolino & Soci (1989)
- Sono io...Topolino (1990)
- Sono io...Paperino (1990)
- Sono io...Pippo (1990)
- Sono io...Pluto (1990)
- Topolino Superstar (1991)
- Paperino Superstar (1991)
- Pippo Superstar (1991)
- Pippo star delle olimpiadi (1992)
- Pippo Superdetective (Inspector Goofy) (1994)
- Paperino Guai in Vista (Birdbrain Donald) (1994)
- Pippo Star dei Mondali (Sport Goofy Soccermania) (1994)
- Paperino 60 Anni in Allegria (Donald's Birthday Bash) (1994)
- Topolino Lupo di Mare (Captain Mickey) (1994)
- Topolino Apprendista Scalatore (Mountainer Mickey) (1994)
- Paparino Disastri in Cuciana (Chef Donald) (1995)
- Pluto Amico Quasi Perfetto (Paperboy Pluto) (1995)
- Topolino Pesca Guai (Fisherman Mickey) (1995)
- Pluto Aiutante Offresi (Pluto Cleans Up) (1995)
- Io Paperino (That's Donald!) (1995)
- Topolino Amore Mio (Mickey Be Mine) (1996)
- Topolino e Minnie Innamorati (Mickey Loves Minnie) (1998)
- I capolavori di Topolino (Mickeys Greatest Hits) (1998)
- I capolavori di Qui Quo Qua (Huey, Dewey and Louie's Greatest Hits) (1998)
- I capolavori di Pluto (Pluto's Greatest Hits) (1998)
- I capolavori di Paperino (Donald's Greatest Hits) (1998)
- I capolavori di Minni (Minnie's Greatest Hits) (1998)
- I capolavori di Pippo (Goofy's Greatest Hits) (1998)

=== France ===
- Les Aventures de Pluto (1980)
- Mickey, Donald, Pluto et Dingo en Vacances (1980)
- Contes et Legendes de Jiminy Cricket (1980)
- La Joyeuse Menagerie (1980)
- Bon Anniversaire Donald (1984)
- Si Disney m'etait Conte (1985)
- Donald et Dingo allias Goofy Champions Olympiques (1985)
- Donald Vedette de Television (1985)
- Sport Goofy Joue et Gagne (1985)
- Silly Symphonies Volume 1 (1985)
- Silly Symphonies Volume 2 (1985)
- Les Nouvelles Aventures de Pluto (1986)
- Les Aventures de Tic et Tac (1986)
- Goofy Fait le Fou (1986)
- Donald et Dingo au Far-West (1986)
- Les Aventures de Mickey et Minnie (The Adventures of Mickey and Minnie) (1988)
- Disney Parade 6 (1988)
- Disney Festival (1988)
- Tic et Tac (Chip' n' Dale) (1994)
- Une Cervelle D'oiseau (1994)
- Les Folles Vacances de Mickey (1996)

=== United Kingdom ===
- Celebrate with Mickey (August 23, 1994)
- Donald's Birthday Bash (August 23, 1994)
- Frontier Pluto (August 23, 1994)

=== Japan ===
- Disney Cartoon Festival 1 (April 21, 1985)
- Fun and Fancy Free (April 21, 1985)
- Disney Cartoon Festival 2 (May 26, 1985)
- Disney Cartoon Festival 3 (July 21, 1985)
- The Academy Award Review Of Walt Disney Cartoons (June 21, 1985)
- Donald Duck Goes West (July 21, 1985)
- The Hunting Instinct (August 26, 1985)
- Make Mine Music (October 21, 1985)
- Merry Christmas (December 16, 1985)
- Winnie the Pooh and a Day for Eeyore and Other Stories (March 25, 1986)
- Donald Duck's 50 Crazy Years (April 25, 1986)
- Milestones For Mickey (May 25, 1986)
- Mickey: Limited Gold Edition (June 25, 1986)
- Minnie: Limited Gold Edition (June 25, 1986)
- Goin' Quackers (June 25, 1986)
- Donald: Limited Gold Edition (July 25, 1986)
- Daisy: Limited Gold Edition (July 25, 1986)
- Scary Tales (July 25, 1986)
- Once Upon a Mouse and Other Mousetime Stories (August 25, 1986)
- The Fabulous 50s: Limited Gold Edition (August 25, 1986)
- Silly Symphonies: Limited Gold Edition (August 25, 1986)
- Pluto: Limited Gold Edition (September 25, 1986)
- Donald Duck and His Duckling Gang (October 25, 1986)
- Donald's Golden Jubilee (November 25, 1986)
- Let's Relax (December 25, 1986)
- Melody Time (January 25, 1987)
