= The Picnic (1930 film) =

1930 film by Burt Gillett

- Title card
- Directed by: Burt Gillett
- Produced by: Walt Disney
- Starring: Walt Disney; Marcellite Garner; Lee Millar
- Color process: Black and white
- Production company: Walt Disney Productions
- Distributed by: Columbia Pictures
- Release date: October 9, 1930
- Running time: 7 min
- Country: United States
- Language: English

The Picnic is a 1930 American animated short film directed by Burt Gillett. It was released on October 9, 1930. It is the 23rd film of the Mickey Mouse series. It is notable for being the first appearance of Pluto, here named Rover, who was redesigned into his current in the 1931 cartoon The Moose Hunt.

Due to being published in 1930, the cartoon entered the public domain on January 1, 2026.

== Plot ==
The short.

Mickey Mouse arrives at Minnie's house to take her out for a picnic. Minnie asks if she can bring her "little Rover", although Rover turns out to be a huge bloodhound the size of Mickey. The mice tie Rover to the back of the car and drive to the picnic spot, but along the way, Rover spies a pair of rabbits and gives chase, dragging the car behind him. Rover chases one rabbit through a series of rabbit holes, but the rabbit pulls the final hole away, and the dog bangs his head on the ground, dazing Rover.

Mickey and Minnie set up for the picnic, and Mickey cranks up the portable gramophone. The mice dance to "In the Good Old Summer Time", but the birds and squirrels are active too, swiping the picnic food while Mickey and Minnie are dancing. Rover follows his nose until he finds Mickey, just as a stormcloud bursts and begins to pour. Mickey gathers up the food and the gramophone—both overrun with animals and bugs—and the three friends jump into the car. Rover's tail acts as a windshield wiper as Mickey and Minnie drive home through the rain.

== Production ==
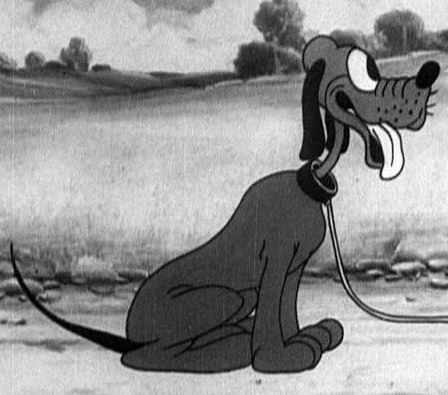
The short featured the character Rover, who would later become the character of Pluto.

The dog, called "Rover" in this cartoon, is an important step towards the creation of Pluto as a major character in the series. Animator Norm Ferguson first drew a pair of bloodhounds in the August 1930 Mickey Mouse short The Chain Gang, and Rover is clearly a continuation of that idea, even featuring a recycled gag from that picture in which one of the dogs sniffs into the camera. The same gag would be reused in 1931's The Moose Hunt and 1939's The Pointer.

Gijs Grob says in Mickey's Movies: The Theatrical Films of Mickey Mouse:

Ferguson had animated the bloodhounds in The Chain Gang which formed the blueprint for Pluto, and he would remain the expert on the character for the rest of Pluto's career, animating important scenes for him, like the flypaper scene in Playful Pluto (1934) and the skating scene in On Ice. Already in The Picnic, Ferguson shows that he understands the pup best, animating Pluto lovingly licking Mickey, Pluto biting himself to get rid of fleas, and Pluto sniffing into the camera.

The dog returned as Pluto six months later in The Moose Hunt, and became so popular that he got his own series in 1937, starting with Pluto's Quintuplets.

In January 1931, Floyd Gottfredson drew a week-long adaptation of The Picnic in the Mickey Mouse comic strip. In the strip, the dog's name was "Tiny", and didn't bear as much resemblance to the final Pluto design as "Rover" did. Pluto appeared in the strip six months later, on July 8.

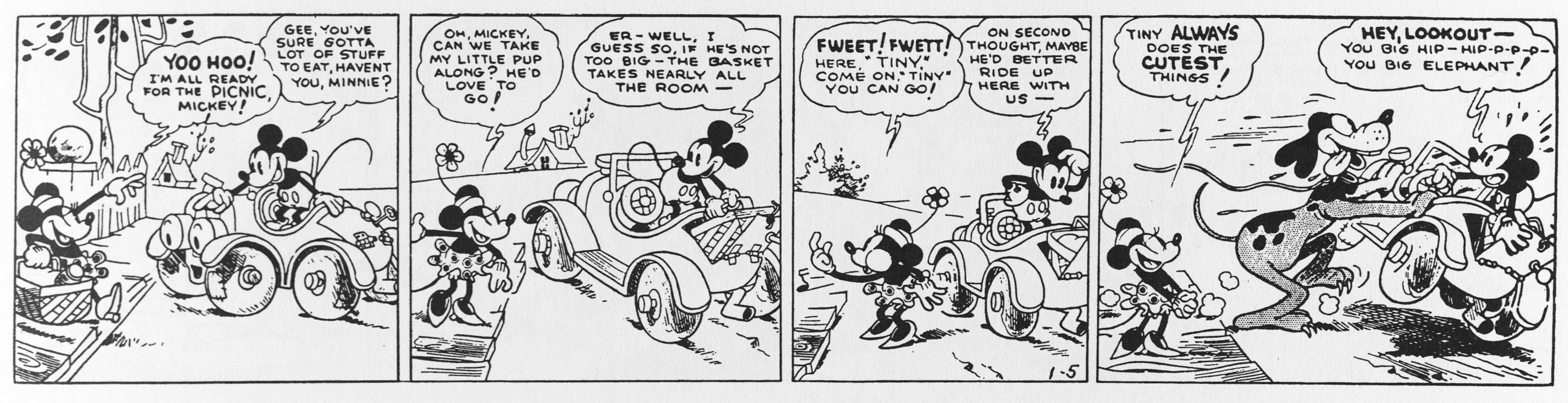
The first strip from the comic strip adaptation (1931-01-05)

== Voice actors ==
- Mickey Mouse: Walt Disney
- Minnie Mouse: Marcellite Garner
- Rover: Lee Millar

== Reception ==
Motion Picture News (November 29, 1930): "Diverting. Mickey Mouse gets himself nicely messed up in a picnic. What the birds ants and whatnot do to the food is just too bad for Mickey, but perfectly swell insofar as the audience and its inclination to laugh is concerned. Produced in his usual, inimitable style by Walt Disney."

The Film Daily (December 7, 1930): "Pip Cartoon. There seems to be no end to the original antics and laugh-producing stunts emanating from the Walt Disney workshops and performed by the sprightly Mickey Mouse and his chief co-worker, Minnie Mouse. This latest number is in the pip class and not only stirs up loud merriment but even elicits a healthy round of applause, which is some tribute considering that the public has been regaled with a considerable quantity of cartoon comedies in the past year or so. In the present subject Mickey takes his Minnie for a picnic in the woods, where they disport themselves while the animals of the forest raid their lunch, until a rainstorm chases all of them to cover."

== Home media ==
The short was released on December 7, 2004 on Walt Disney Treasures: Mickey Mouse in Black and White, Volume Two: 1929-1935.

== Television ==
The short appeared on the following TV anthologies:

- The Mickey Mouse Club (season 1, episode 99; season 2, episode 66)
- Mickey's Mouse Tracks (season 1, episode 55)

== See also ==
- Mickey Mouse (film series)
