= Two Weeks Vacation =

- Theatrical release poster
- Directed by: Jack Kinney
- Story by: Al Bertino
- Produced by: Walt Disney
- Starring: Pinto Colvig; Alan Reed
- Narrated by: Alan Reed
- Music by: Oliver Wallace
- Animation by: Ed Aardal; Hugh Fraser; Dan MacManus (effects); George Nicholas; John Sibley
- Layouts by: Al Zinnen
- Backgrounds by: Art Riley
- Color process: Technicolor
- Production company: Walt Disney Productions
- Distributed by: RKO Radio Pictures
- Release dates: October 21, 1952 (UK); October 31, 1952 (US)
- Running time: 6 minutes
- Country: United States
- Language: English

Two Weeks Vacation is a 1952 American animated short film produced by Walt Disney Productions and released by RKO Radio Pictures. The cartoon follows Goofy on an ill-fated vacation trip traveling cross country. It was directed by Jack Kinney and features the voices of Pinto Colvig as Goofy and Alan Reed as the narrator and a hitchhiker.

== Plot ==
Goofy is seen in a crowded office dreaming about his coming paid vacation. He plans "fishing at Fond du Lac, sunrise in the Rockies, basking on the beach, dude ranching, golfing, boating, and hunting in the North Woods".

As soon as the clock strikes 12 noon, Goofy races outside the office building to his red car and heads out on the highway. From this point, the film follows a series of vignettes showing Goofy's many travel problems, all accompanied by sarcastic comments from the narrator. The first problem Goofy faces is getting stuck behind a white slow-moving travel trailer pulled by a yellow car that he can't seem to pass. The same trailer continues to follow Goofy, yet always remains one step ahead of him and causes most of his problems.

The first time Goofy tried to pass it, a milk bottle falls off the trailer's platform and damages his car's tire and motor and is forced to go to a workshop to get it fixed. The owner digs through the car's engine, throwing out random parts until he takes out the motor and claims that he needs a new one before throwing it into a trunk. After the motor is fixed, Goofy pays the owner, but the workshop then closes for two weeks before Goofy can ask him to fix the tire and is forced to do it himself. The trailer comes by while he's working. After getting his car fixed, Goofy races through the desert and comes across a traveler and offers him a lift but he refuses after noticing the car's poor qualities (such as lacking a radio, a heater, a better paint job, and thicker tires).

Goofy passes a traffic light which is on "stop". He managed to stop a few distances behind it and quickly goes back in front of it. While waiting, a rain cloud shows up and pours water over Goofy's car. At the same time, the traffic light switches to "go" and the trailer passes him. In response, Goofy tries to pass it a second time, but dust is swept out the trailer's door, clouding Goofy's sight. This also causes him to drive off the road and into a tree, allowing the trailer to pass him again.

Nighttime then comes and Goofy tries to find a place to sleep. He comes across a sign and after striking a match in an unsuccessful attempt to read the sign, he lifts his car with a carjack to shine it's headlights on the sign so he can read it. The signs points out that there are hotels further down the road and further back the way he came. He then chooses to turn around and notices that all hotels have no vacancy except one. However, his car runs out of gas before he can reach it and worst of all, the trailer has taken the extra spot in the hotel.

Goofy pushes his car to a gas station, but it suddenly rolls down a hill, leading him to a hotel that has a beautiful designed house which reveals to be a fake display in front of a plain cabin. He stays there for the night, but is forced to leave when a train wakes him up. A really tired Goofy travels through the night, being stunned by passing cars along the way. He once again encounters the trailer and can see people partying inside of it and is nearly hit by a truck when he tries to pass it again. He is finally able to pass the trailer by driving on a cliff wall, but when he yells at the driver, he is alarmed to see no one driving the car. He speeds away to avoid the car and trailer which is running out of control. Goofy is then knocked out of his car and into the trailer's car. After he notices that he's driving the trailer, he sees his own car slowing down while he passes it and is caught by a policeman. He is then arrested for speeding and is finally seen in jail, but happy for having found the "perfect haven for rest and relaxation".

== Releases ==
- 1952 - original theatrical release
- 1957 - Disneyland, episode #4.11: "How to Relax" (TV)
- c. 1983 - Good Morning, Mickey!, episode #35 (TV)
- 1998 - The Ink and Paint Club, episode #1.43: "On Vacation" (TV)

== Home media ==
The short was released on December 2, 2002, on Walt Disney Treasures: The Complete Goofy.

Additional releases include:

- 1984 - "Cartoon Classics: Sport Goofy's Vacation" (VHS)
- 1992 - "Cartoon Classics - Special Edition: Happy Summer Days" (VHS)
- 2005 - "Classic Cartoon Favorites: Extreme Adventure Fun" (DVD)
