= From All of Us to All of You =

Disney's animated television Christmas special

- Walt Disney Presents episode
- Directed by: Jack Hannah
- Original air date: December 19, 1958

"From All of Us to All of You" is an animated television Christmas special, produced by Walt Disney Productions and first presented on December 19, 1958, on ABC as part of the Walt Disney Presents anthology series. Hosted by Jiminy Cricket along with Mickey Mouse and Tinker Bell, the special combines newly produced animation with clips from vintage animated Disney shorts and feature films, presented to the viewer as "Christmas cards" from the various characters starring in each one.

The episode was re-broadcast for the first time on Christmas Day, in 1960. Starting in 1963 and continuing through the 1970s, re-airings of the special would be in color instead of black-and-white and include preview footage of the studio's new or upcoming feature films. Beginning in 1983, it was expanded to 90 minutes and retitled A Disney Channel Christmas for airing on cable television's The Disney Channel. A re-tooled home video version of the special, retitled Jiminy Cricket's Christmas, appeared on VHS, Betamax, and Laserdisc in 1986. The special has yet to see a DVD release.

The show has been shown infrequently in the United States in recent years. However, in Sweden, the program has been shown every Christmas Eve since 1960. Ratings show that around 40% of all Swedes watch it on Christmas Eve, the record (in 1997) being just over half the population.

== Regional variations and local cultural significance ==
=== United States ===
In the U.S., the show originally aired on ABC and occasionally afterwards on NBC. The original version included Walt Disney's introduction where he has been "cricket-sized", because, as Mickey and Jiminy would say, Christmas is bigger than all of them. The American version has not been shown on network television since 1980.

The original American version features the following shorts:

- Santa's Workshop (1932)
- Toy Tinkers (1949): included an extended introduction (with a song-and-dance) as well as scenes of Chip and Dale's own Christmas decorating activities.

There were also clips from the following feature films, labeled in the special as "Memorable Moments":

- Peter Pan – "You Can Fly!"
- Bambi – Bambi and Thumper ice skating
- Pinocchio – "I've Got No Strings"
- Lady and the Tramp – "Bella Notte"
- Cinderella – "The Work Song" / "A Dream Is a Wish Your Heart Makes"
- Snow White and the Seven Dwarfs – "The Silly Song"

The special ends with Jiminy Cricket sharing his memorable moment, his song "When You Wish Upon a Star" (from Pinocchio), which he states "symbolizes faith, hope and all the things that Christmas stands for".

Starting in 1963 and continuing through the 1970s, all scenes with Walt and Tinker Bell's intros, as well as Santa's Workshop, were replaced with a surprise gift, which were teasers for upcoming Disney films, including The Sword in the Stone (1963), The Jungle Book (1967), The Aristocats (1970), Robin Hood (1973) and Pete's Dragon (1977). In the 1963 version, Walt Disney presented the surprise gift. Starting in 1967, Jiminy Cricket hosted the surprise gift segment. The 1979 broadcast differed from the rest, as a pre-existing short, Corn Chips (1951), starring Donald Duck and Chip 'n' Dale was presented.

=== Denmark ===
In Denmark, the show is called Disneys Juleshow: Fra alle os til alle jer (Disney's Christmas Show: From All of Us to All of You) and is broadcast every Christmas Eve at 4:00 p.m. on DR1. It is narrated by Danish actor Ove Sprogøe who does the Danish voice of Jiminy Cricket. Clips from feature films are voiced in Danish while shorts are in English with Danish subtitles. It was first broadcast in 1967, but Danish audio was not available until 1979.

The Danish version features the following shorts:

- Pluto's Christmas Tree (1952)
- Donald's Snow Fight (1942)

As well as clips from the following feature films:

- Snow White and the Seven Dwarfs
- Lady and the Tramp
- Bambi
- Pinocchio
- The Aristocats
- Peter Pan
- Cinderella

It ends with Bjørn Tidmand singing "When You Wish upon a Star" in Danish ("Når Du Ser et Stjerneskud") and a sneak peek of either an upcoming or a clip from a recently or soon-to-be-released Disney feature film.

=== Finland ===
In Finland, the show is called Samu Sirkan joulutervehdys, (Jiminy Cricket's Christmas Greeting) and is shown every Christmas Eve evening and Christmas morning on MTV3.

The Finnish version features clips from the following shorts:

- Pluto's Christmas Tree (1952)
- The Small One (1978)
- The Clock Watcher (1945)

There are also clips from the following feature films:

- Pinocchio
- Cinderella
- Peter Pan
- Lady and the Tramp
- The Three Caballeros

A special "surprise" clip (from a recent or upcoming Disney feature premiere) is dubbed in Finnish but everything else is in English with Finnish subtitles.

=== Norway ===
In Norway, the show is called Donald Duck og vennene hans (Donald Duck and his friends) on NRK and Disneys julekavalkade (Disney's Christmas Cavalcade) on TV Norge (the latter began airing in 2003), and is shown every Christmas Eve afternoon at 2:00pm on NRK1 and NRK Super. Most of the shorts are shown in their original English-speaking versions, with Norwegian subtitles.

The following shorts are usually shown (in particular in NRK's version), in integral or edited format:

- Pluto's Christmas Tree
- Mickey's Trailer
- Ferdinand the Bull
- Donald's Snow Fight

These feature films are represented through important scenes:

- Snow White and the Seven Dwarfs ("The Silly Song" scene)
- Cinderella ("The Work Song" scene)
- Lady and the Tramp ("Bella Notte" scene)
- The Jungle Book ("The Bare Necessities" scene)
- Bambi (Ice lake scene; dubbed)
- The Three Caballeros ("Las Posadas" scene; subtitles in Norwegian)

Previously shown:

- Clown of the Jungle (Edited version without Donald's second shooting spree;)
- Robin Hood
- Santa's Workshop

Upcoming shown:

- The Little Matchgirl
- Toy Story ("Christmas in Andy's New House" scene)
- Knick Knack
- Tin Toy
- Luxo Jr.
- The Adventures of André & Wally B.
- Bolt ("The Pound" scene)
- Red's Dream
- Dumbo ("Look Out for Mr. Stork" scene)
- Frozen ("Let It Go" scene; dubbed)
- The Nightmare Before Christmas ("What's This?" scene)

=== Sweden ===
In Sweden, the show is called Kalle Anka och hans vänner önskar God Jul (Donald Duck and His Friends Wish You a Merry Christmas). It is broadcast on SVT1 at 3:05 p.m. as part of the channel's traditional Christmas Eve programming, which features a live host between programmes, a role closely associated with Arne Weise, who is the only host to have featured more than three times (22 appearances between 1964 and 2002). The changed title reflects the fact that Donald Duck is far more popular than Mickey Mouse in Sweden. The montage is narrated by Bengt Feldreich, who translates character dialogue through voiceover dubs, and also replaces the original English voice of Jiminy Cricket (Cliff Edwards), including the performance of When You Wish Upon a Star.

The special, which is typically referred to as simply Kalle Anka (Donald Duck), along with its characters and cartoons, is ingrained in Swedish pop culture as a Christmas tradition. The popularity of Kalle Anka in Sweden as a television event was influenced by several factors, including the fact that for the ten years since the special's original premiere in 1960, SVT1 was the only television channel in the country (SVT2 launched in 1969), and even then, the country's public broadcaster Sveriges Television had a monopoly on television broadcasting until the 1987 launch of TV3, the country's first commercial channel. At the time, it was also one of the few occasions that U.S.-produced animation was broadcast on Swedish television. Kalle Anka has remained one of the most-watched television specials in the country; usually drawing more than five million viewers up until the 1990s, and still drawing 3.3 million viewers in 2019 (in a country with 8.5 and 10 million inhabitants in those years, respectively).

Due to its legacy and prominence, the special has remained largely unchanged. The Swedish public has been protective of Kalle Anka, resisting any significant changes to the special's content: in the 1970s, when SVT's head of children's programming disclosed plans to discontinue the special due to growing anti-commercial sentiment in the country, public and tabloid outcry resulted in the special being maintained. A similar backlash was faced in 1982 when Ferdinand the Bull was replaced with The Ugly Duckling — a change that was reverted the following year. In 2012, Disney decided to edit the Santa's Workshop segment, removing "cultural stereotypes", that had been restored to the episode in 1983, provoking another public debate. From the 2021 broadcast onward, Disney introduced disclaimers to provide additional context for outdated cultural depictions.

The following shorts are usually shown, in integral or edited format:

- Santa's Workshop
- Clown of the Jungle
- Pluto's Christmas Tree
- Mickey's Trailer
- Ferdinand the Bull

These feature films are represented through key scenes:

- Snow White and the Seven Dwarfs ("The Silly Song" scene)
- Cinderella ("The Work Song" scene)
- Lady and the Tramp ("Bella Notte" scene)
- The Jungle Book ("Bare Neccessities" scene)
- Robin Hood ("Robin robbing prince John" scene)

One or two clips from new and upcoming Disney feature films are also shown and change each year. These "surprise gifts" are also shown on all other international broadcasts within their respective year.

1985

- The Black Cauldron

1986

- The Great Mouse Detective

1988

- The Fox and the Hound

1989

- Oliver & Company

1990

- The Little Mermaid

1991

- The Rescuers Down Under

1992

- Beauty and the Beast

1993

- Aladdin

1994

- The Aristocats
- The Lion King

1995

- Pocahontas
- One Hundred and One Dalmatians

1996

- Dumbo
- The Hunchback of Notre Dame

1997

- Alice in Wonderland
- Hercules

1998

- The Lion King II: Simba's Pride
- Mulan

1999

- The Aristocats
- Tarzan

2000

- The Tigger Movie
- The Emperor's New Groove

2001

- The Hunchback of Notre Dame II
- Atlantis: The Lost Empire

2002

- 101 Dalmatians II: Patch's London Adventure
- Treasure Planet

2003

- The Lion King 1½
- Brother Bear

2004

- Bambi
- Pooh's Heffalump Movie

2005

- Kronk's New Groove
- Chicken Little

2006

- Peter Pan
- Cars

2007

- One Hundred and One Dalmatians
- Ratatouille

2008

- Pinocchio
- Bolt

2009

- Toy Story 2
- The Princess and the Frog

2010

- Cars
- Tangled

2011

- Winnie the Pooh
- The Lion King

2012

- Wreck-It Ralph
- Monsters, Inc.

2013

- Frozen (teaser trailer)
- Planes

2014

- Big Hero 6 (teaser trailer)
- Frozen

2015

- Zootopia (teaser trailer)
- The Good Dinosaur

2016

- Moana
- Cars

2017

- Coco
- Olaf's Frozen Adventure

2018

- Ralph Breaks the Internet
- Incredibles 2

2019

- Frozen 2
- Toy Story 4

2020

- Soul
- Once Upon a Snowman

2021

- Olaf Presents
- Encanto

2022

- Strange World
- Cars on the Road

2023

- Inside Out 2 (teaser trailer)
- Wish

2024

- Dream Productions
- Moana 2

2025

- Zootopia 2
- Hoppers (teaser trailer)

Number of viewers (according to Mediamätning i Skandinavien).
Year	Viewers	
1994	3,223,000	Fourth most popular show of the year (1: Melodifestivalen, 2: Winter Olympics)
1995	3,880,000	Most popular show of the year
1996	4,124,000	Most popular show of the year
1997	4,319,000	Most popular show of the year
1998	3,599,000	Most popular show of the year
1999	4,165,000	Most popular show of the year
2000	3,565,000	Fourth most popular show of the year
2001	3,825,000	Second most popular show of the year
2002	3,655,000	Second most popular show of the year
2003	3,410,000	Fourth most popular show of the year
2004	3,685,000	Third most popular show of the year
2005	3,515,000	Second most popular show of the year
2006	3,610,000	Second most popular show of the year
2007	3,490,000	Second most popular show of the year
2008	3,215,000	Third most popular show of the year
2009	3,294,000	Second most watched show of the year
2010	3,356,000	Second most watched show of the year
2011	3,495,000	Second most watched show of the year
2012	3,883,000	Second most watched show of the year
2013	3,570,000	Fourth most popular show of the year
2014	3,705,000	Most popular show of the year
2015	3,460,000	Second most watched show of the year
2016	3,736,000	Most popular show of the year
2017	3,865,000	Most popular show of the year
2018	3,786,000	Most popular show of the year
2019	3,358,000	Second most watched show of the year
2020	4,519,000	Most popular show of the year
2021	3,760,000	Most popular show of the year
2022	3,411,000	Most watched show of the year
2023	2,907,000	
2024	3,089,000	
2025	2,950,000	

=== Russia ===
In Russia, the show is called С Рождеством, от всего сердца! (Merry Christmas With Whole Our Heart). It was first broadcast on Channel One Russia on January 2, 2011, and was rerun on December 31, 2012. From January 7, 2013, to January 7, 2021, it was shown on Disney Channel CIS each year, with nightly reruns showing throughout the first days of the New Year.

The Russian version features the following shorts:

- Santa's Workshop (1932)
- Pluto's Christmas Tree (1952)

As well as clips from the following feature films:

- Peter Pan
- Bambi
- Pinocchio
- Cinderella
- Snow White and the Seven Dwarfs
- The Little Mermaid – "Under the Sea"
- Beauty and the Beast – "Be Our Guest"

Two short clips from new and upcoming Disney feature films are shown at the very end to promote them; like the other international broadcasts, the clips also change each year.

2010

- Toy Story 3
- Tangled

2012

- Brave
- Secret of the Wings

2013

- Frozen teaser trailer
- Planes

2014

- Big Hero 6
- Frozen

2015

- Inside Out
- The Good Dinosaur

2016

- Finding Dory
- Moana

2017

- Coco
- Olaf's Frozen Adventure

2018

- Incredibles 2
- Ralph Breaks the Internet

2019

- Frozen 2
- Toy Story 4

2020

- Soul

=== France ===
In France, the show is called Un Nouveau Noël Disney (A New Disney Christmas) or Les Contes d'hiver de Jiminy Cricket (Jiminy Cricket's Winter Tales). It was broadcast on TF1 on December 23, 1990, as part of the "Disney Parade" program.

The French version features the following short:

- Toy Tinkers (1949)

As well as clips from the following feature films:

- Tron
- Peter Pan
- Bambi
- Pinocchio
- Lady and the Tramp
- Cinderella
- Snow White and the Seven Dwarfs
- Fantasia
- The Jungle Book
- The Aristocats

=== Poland ===
In Poland, the show was called Najlepsze z najlepszych: Święta z Disneyem! (The Best of The Best: Christmas with Disney!). It was first broadcast on TVP1 on December 24, 2010, and aired annually on Christmas Eve until 2012.

The Polish version featured the following shorts:

- Santa's Workshop (1932)
- Pluto's Christmas Tree (1952)

As well as clips from the following feature films:

- Peter Pan
- Bambi
- Pinocchio
- Cinderella
- Snow White and the Seven Dwarfs
- The Little Mermaid – "Under the Sea"
- Beauty and the Beast – "Be Our Guest"

Two short clips from Disney films released at the year of the broadcast year were shown at the very end to promote them; like the other international broadcasts, the clips also changed each year.

2010

- Toy Story 3
- Tangled

2011

- Cars 2
- Winnie the Pooh

2012

- Brave
- Secret of the Wings

=== Romania ===
In Romania, the show was called Din partea noastră pentru voi (From All of Us to All of You). Unlike the Polish version, which aired annually from 2010 to 2012, the Romanian version was broadcast only once, on Christmas Day in 2010, on Prima TV. The Romanian broadcast featured the following shorts:

- Santa's Workshop (1932)
- Pluto's Christmas Tree (1952)

As well as clips from the following feature films:

- Peter Pan (1953)
- Bambi (1942)
- Pinocchio (1940)
- Cinderella (1950)
- The Little Mermaid (1989) – "Under the Sea"
- Beauty and the Beast (1991) – "Be Our Guest"

Two short clips from Disney films released in 2010 were shown at the very end to promote them, as in other international broadcasts:

- Toy Story 3 (2010)
- Tangled (2010)

=== Italy ===
In Italy, the special was first broadcast on the Programma Nazionale on Christmas Eve 1960, as an episode of Disneyland, with the title Buon Natale a tutti voi (Merry Christmas to You All).

On Christmas Day 1980, the special was rebroadcast in the afternoon by Rete 1 in a new version, as part of the program 3, 2, 1... contatto!, under the title Da tutti noi a tutti voi, which more closely reflects the original title. The Italian version, produced using the master of the 1973 American rebroadcast, was overseen by Roberto and Andrea De Leonardis.

The Italian 1980 version features the following shorts:

- Pluto's Christmas Tree (1952): dubbed
- Donald's Snow Fight (1942): in English

There were also clips from the following feature films:

- Peter Pan – "You Can Fly!"
- Bambi – Bambi and Thumper ice skating (1968 dubbing)
- Pinocchio – "I've Got No Strings"
- Lady and the Tramp – "Bella Notte"
- Cinderella – "A Dream Is a Wish Your Heart Makes" (1967 dubbing)
- Snow White and the Seven Dwarfs – "The Silly Song" (1972 dubbing)

Feature films that had been redubbed by the time of the broadcast were presented with their most recent theatrical dubs.

Before Jiminy Cricket's closing song, "Una stella cade" ("When You Wish Upon a Star"), the song "Resterà l'amor" ("Love"), from the film Robin Hood, was also featured as a preview of its theatrical re-release.

In September 1989, the special was released on VHS in a further re-edited version, produced by Royfilm and dubbed by Gruppo Trenta. Unlike the previous version, "Una stella cade" was used as the opening song, while the surprise gift segment featured several scenes from the film The Aristocats. In addition, Pluto's Christmas Tree was redubbed, while Donald's Snow Fight received an Italian dub for the first time. The dubbing of Peter Pan was also replaced with the one produced for the film's 1987 theatrical re-release.

The special continued to be rebroadcast by RAI throughout the 1990s, with the closing preview replaced each time by one for a newly released film, such as The Little Mermaid. It was also broadcast under the title Da tutti noi a tutti voi di nuovo qui per voi (From All of Us to All of You—Back Here for You Once Again).

== See also ==
- A Disney Christmas Gift, another Disney Christmas special first broadcast in 1982
- Dinner for One, a British sketch that has become a New Year's Eve tradition in Germany and other countries
- Little Lord Fauntleroy, a British family film that has become a Christmas classic in Germany
- The Irony of Fate, a Soviet romantic comedy television film that is traditionally broadcast in Russia and most former Soviet republics every New Year's Eve
- The Snowman, an animated television special shown every Christmas in the United Kingdom since 1982
- Tři oříšky pro Popelku, a Czechoslovak/East German fairy-tale film that is shown on television around Christmas time every year in many European countries
- The Late Late Toy Show
