= Beach Picnic =

1939 Donald Duck cartoon

- Theatrical release poster
- Directed by: Clyde Geronimi
- Story by: Carl Barks; Jack Hannah
- Produced by: Walt Disney (executive)
- Starring: Clarence Nash; Lee Millar
- Music by: Paul J. Smith
- Animation by: Preston Blair; Lars Calonius; Chester Cobb; David Hilberman; Al Eugster; Ed Love; Paul Satterfield; Norman Ferguson; Claude Smith; Frank Oreb
- Layouts by: David Hilberman
- Color process: Technicolor
- Production company: Walt Disney Productions
- Distributed by: RKO Radio Pictures
- Release date: June 9, 1939; (USA)
- Running time: 8:24
- Country: United States
- Language: English

Beach Picnic is an American animated short film released on June 9, 1939, featuring Donald Duck and Pluto, produced by Walt Disney Productions in Technicolor and distributed by RKO Radio Pictures. This cartoon featured Donald and Pluto at the beach. It was the first cartoon in the Donald Duck series to feature Pluto (although he had previously appeared with Donald in Donald and Pluto).

== Plot ==
Donald Duck is having a picnic at the beach, singing happily. After preparing the food, he tries to ride on an inflatable horse named Seabiscuit, but gets repeatedly bounced off of it, annoying him.

Donald then spots Pluto sleeping soundly on the shore, and decides to prank him by pushing Seabiscuit near him and mimicking a horse's whinnying. The mesmerized Pluto tries to chase Seabiscuit around some rocky reefs, but gets repeatedly frightened by the horse bumping him from behind. Getting angry, Pluto bites on the rubber horse's air valve, causing him to inflate like a balloon. As the rubber horse goes completely flat, Pluto is sent flying through the air and crashes onto the shore.

The scene cuts to an ant, who spots Donald's food. It calls for the other ants to come and help steal the food. The ants swarm toward the picnic food and start carrying it away. Donald angrily rants at the ants, and then notices some flypaper and decides to use it against them.

An ant secretly tries carrying away a piece of cake. Pluto spots the ant and starts sniffing at it as it runs away. While Pluto follows the ant, Donald has finished setting up his flypaper trap. The ant wisely crawls under the trap, but Pluto gets the flypaper stuck on his nose. After a long struggle, Pluto flies backward and bumps into Donald, causing the flypaper to get stuck on their bottoms.

Donald angrily rants at Pluto as they struggle to free themselves, until Pluto, having had enough of Donald's ranting, runs around in circles, tossing Donald into his flypaper trap, causing his body to get wrapped in all of the flypapers like a mummy. As Donald angrily tries to free himself, Pluto runs over to him and starts licking him, ending the cartoon.

== Cast ==
- Clarence Nash as Donald Duck
- Lee Millar as Pluto

== Home media ==
The short was released on May 18, 2004, on Walt Disney Treasures: The Chronological Donald, Volume One: 1934-1941.

The short was also released on The Complete Pluto Volume 1.

== Notes ==
The running gag of Pluto getting stuck in the flypaper from Playful Pluto is reused in this short. The other running gag of Pluto licking Donald from Donald and Pluto was also reused in this short. The relation of Donald and Pluto is unknown for they rarely get paired on screen.
