= Cy Young (disambiguation) =

Cy Young (1867–1955) was a Major League Baseball pitcher who played from 1890 to 1911.

Cy Young may also refer to:

- Harry Young (American football) or Cy Young (1893–1977), College Football Hall of Fame inductee
- Cy Young (animator) (1897–1964), Chinese American special effects animator
- Cy Young (javelin thrower) (1928–2017), American Olympic Gold medalist in the javelin throw

== See also ==
- Cy Young Award, an annual award for baseball pitchers named after the pitcher Cy Young
