= Lee Millar =

American voice actor

- Born: Lee Carson Millar Sr. February 20, 1888
- Died: December 24, 1941 (aged 53)

Lee Carson Millar Sr. (February 20, 1888 – December 24, 1941) was an American voice actor for animated films and radio programs. He also appeared on stage. He voiced Pluto in various Disney animated films and had other film voice roles.

Millar was born in Oakland, California. In June 1913, he was a member of the Alcazar Stock Company, when Leo Ditrichstein cast him for a role in Such Is Life. He performed well enough that when the production was launched on Broadway by David Belasco the following August as The Temperamental Journey, Millar was brought East to reprise the same part.

In 1923 he married actress Verna Felton. They had a son, Lee Millar Jr. who was also a performer; Millar Jr. voices Jim Dear and a dogcatcher in Lady and the Tramp.

Pinto Colvig and Bill Farmer also voiced Pluto in Disney shorts. Millar wrote "Collecting Evidence", a dramatic sketch.

== Filmography ==
- The Chain Gang – Hounds
- The Picnic
- Winter – Wolf
- The Moose Hunt – Pluto, Moose
- The Delivery Boy – Pluto
- Mickey Steps Out – Pluto
- Fishin' Around – Pluto
- The Barnyard Broadcast – Pluto, Cat
- The Fox Hunt – Hunting Dogs
- The Beach Party – Pluto, Clarabelle Cow
- Mickey's Orphans – Pluto
- The Ugly Duckling – Dog
- The Bird Store
- The Duck Hunt – Pluto
- The Grocery Boy – Pluto
- The Mad Dog – Pluto, Captured Dogs
- Mickey's Revue – Pluto
- Musical Farmer – Pluto
- Mickey's Nightmare – Pluto
- Mickey's Good Deed – Pluto, Butler
- Mickey's Pal Pluto – Pluto
- Bosko's Mechanical Man – Dog
- Puppy Love – Pluto
- Playful Pluto – Pluto
- Mickey's Kangaroo – Pluto
- Pluto's Judgement Day – Pluto
- Alpine Climbers – Pluto (some sounds)
- Donald and Pluto – Pluto
- Mickey's Elephant – Pluto
- Mother Pluto – Pluto
- The Worm Turns – Pluto
- Don Donald – Burro
- Moose Hunters
- Make Way for Tomorrow
- Farmyard Symphony
- Mickey's Parrot – Pluto
- Beach Picnic – Pluto
- The Pointer – Pluto
- Konga, the Wild Stallion – Randall
- Donald's Dog Laundry – Pluto
- Put-Put Troubles – Pluto
- Bone Trouble – Pluto
- Pluto's Dream House – Pluto
- Window Cleaners – Pluto
- Nobody's Children – Dr. Gireaux
- Mr. Mouse Takes a Trip – Pluto
- Pantry Pirate – Pluto
- Pluto's Playmate – Pluto
- A Gentleman's Gentleman – Pluto
- Baggage Buster – Animals
