= Lion Down =

- Directed by: Jack Kinney
- Story by: Dick Kinney; Milt Schaffer
- Produced by: Walt Disney
- Starring: Pinto Colvig; Jimmy MacDonald
- Music by: Paul Smith
- Animation by: Charles Nichols; John Sibley; George Nicholas
- Layouts by: Al Zinnen
- Backgrounds by: Merle Cox
- Color process: Technicolor
- Production company: Walt Disney Productions
- Distributed by: RKO Radio Pictures
- Release date: January 5, 1951 (U.S.)
- Running time: 6:33
- Country: United States
- Language: English

Lion Down is a 1951 Goofy cartoon featuring Goofy and Louie the Mountain Lion. The film's plot centers on Goofy and Louie competing for a comfortable place to rest. The film is Louie's third appearance.

== Plot ==
Goofy is trying to enjoy some peace and quiet on his hammock, but can't find a second tree to link it to. It is revealed that Goofy has a mock backyard on top of a huge skyscraper. To get a new tree, he heads out of the city and into the country to get a tree, one that is the home of Louie the Mountain Lion. Goofy and Louie begin competing for the hammock and tree (for example, they push each other off and sneak in after placing a doorbell call). Eventually, Goofy and Louie's competition for a resting place causes the hammock to break free out of the building, resulting in nothing but mayhem. Goofy and Louie decide to go their own ways, with Goofy staying where he is and Louie heading back to the countryside with his tree. Fortunately, an acorn falls off and Goofy ties a knot on it, then he starts watering it, planning to grow his own tree for the hammock.

== Home media ==
The short was released on December 2, 2002, on Walt Disney Treasures: The Complete Goofy and on the "Walt Disney's Classic Cartoon Favorites Starring Goofy" Volume 3.

== See also ==
- Father's Lion
- Hook, Lion and Sinker
- Lion Around
