= Andy Engman =

Swedish/Finnish cartoon animator

- Born: Andrew Alfons Engman; November 21, 1911; Vaasa, Finland
- Died: July 16, 2004 (aged 92); Piñon Hills, California

Andrew Alfons Engman (November 21, 1911 – July 16, 2004) was a Swedish/Finnish cartoon animator. Engman worked for Walt Disney Studios in Burbank, California, from the animating of Snow White and the Seven Dwarfs (1937 film) to the completion of The Jungle Book (1967 film), from 1937 to 1971. He started as an "In-Betweener" animator. He did some Donald Duck and Goofy cartoons as a character animator and became a special effects animator. Later, he went into production in a middle management position. He also worked on the effect animations of Make Mine Music (1946) and the layout of Der Fuehrer's Face (1943).

== Early life ==
Andrew Alfons Engman was born in Vaasa, Finland, on November 21, 1911. As a child during World War I in the 1910s, Andy claims he could see Russian Soldiers going through his yard

== Works ==
Visual Effects:

- The Brave Engineer (1950) (effects animator)
- Make Mine Music (1946) (effects animator)
- How to Be a Sailor (1944) (animator)
- The Olympic Champ (1942) (animator) (uncredited)
- How to Play Baseball (1942) (animator)
- Donald's Gold Mine (1942) (animator)
- Donald's Snow Fight (1942) (effects animator) (uncredited)
- The Art of Self Defense (1941) (animator)
- The Art of Skiing (1941) (animator)
- The Reluctant Dragon (1941) (effects animator) (uncredited)
- Baggage Buster (1941) (effects animator) (uncredited)
- A Gentleman's Gentleman (1941) (animator)
- The Little Whirlwind (1941) (effects animator) (uncredited)
- Pluto's Playmate (1941) (animator)
- Pantry Pirate (1940) (animator)
- Goofy's Glider (1940) (animator)
- Fantasia (1940) (effects animator) (segment "The Sorcerer's Apprentice") (uncredited)
- Put-Put Troubles (1940) (effects animator) (uncredited)
- Pinocchio (1940) (effects animator) (uncredited)
- Brave Little Tailor (1938) (effects animator) (uncredited)
- Snow White and the Seven Dwarfs (1937) (effects animator) (uncredited)

Animation Department:

- Bootle Beetle (1947) (animator)
- Clown of the Jungle (1947) (animator)
- Double Dribble (1946) (animator)
- Frank Duck Brings 'em Back Alive (1946) (animator)
- Canine Patrol (1945) (animator)
- Duck Pimples (1945) (animator)
- Californy'er Bust (1945) (animator)
- African Diary (1945) (animator)
- First Aiders (1944) (animator)
- Victory Vehicles (1943) (animator)
- Saludos Amigos (1942) (animator) (as Andrew Engman)
- Donald's Garden (1942) (effects animator)
- The New Spirit (1942) (animator) (uncredited)
- Der Fuehrer's Face (1943) (animator) (uncredited)
