= Fred Spencer =

American animator

- Born: May 1, 1904; Missouri, U.S.
- Died: November 11, 1938 (aged 34); California, U.S.
- Occupation: Animator
- Years active: 1931–1938

Fred Spencer (May 1, 1904 – November 11, 1938) was an American animator who worked at Walt Disney Productions. He was considered an authority on Donald Duck and wrote an influential analysis of the character.

== Career ==
Spencer joined Walt Disney Productions in 1931 and first worked on several early Mickey Mouse cartoons. In 1932 he began independently producing a two-tier Mickey Mouse comic strip, even though he was not connected with the comics department at Disney. The studio approved the project and the strip appeared in the national DeMolay newsletter.

The character Donald Duck was introduced at Disney in 1934, and Spencer began to focus more on Donald than on Mickey. In December 1935 Spencer wrote an analysis of Donald which served as the standard for writing for, drawing, and animating the character. Spencer's model sheets included in the report feature a redesigned version of Donald that was shorter and rounder – largely identical to his appearance today. Spencer also included remarks on Donald's personality and mannerisms. Donald's new design was seen on screen starting in 1936, although some animators took longer to adapt to the changes.

Spencer animated on seven Disney short films as well as the studio's first feature, Snow White and the Seven Dwarfs (1937). Spencer's short projects include Mickey's Fire Brigade (1935), On Ice (1935), Moving Day (1936), Donald and Pluto, Don Donald (1937), Pluto's Quin-puplets, and Donald's Golf Game (1938).

== Personal life ==
Spencer was a member of DeMolay International and received the prestigious Legion of Honor award. He also drew a monthly comic strip starring Mickey Mouse for their magazine. He died in a car accident in 1938.

== Filmography ==
- The Klondike Kid (1932)
- Babes in the Woods (1932)
- Mickey's Service Station (1935)
- The Cookie Carnival (1935)
- Mickey's Fire Brigade (1935)
- On Ice (1936)
- Orphans' Picnic (1936)
- Moving Day (1936)
- Donald and Pluto (1937)
- Don Donald (1937)
- Snow White and the Seven Dwarfs (1937)
- Pluto's Quin-puplets (1938)
- The Fox Hunt (1938)
- Mickey's Parrot (1938)
- Donald's Golf Game (1938)
- Donald's Penguin (1939)
