= Tea for Two Hundred =

1948 Donald Duck cartoon

- Theatrical release poster
- Directed by: Jack Hannah
- Story by: Bill Berg; Nick George
- Produced by: Walt Disney
- Starring: Pinto Colvig; Clarence Nash
- Music by: Oliver Wallace
- Animation by: Bob Carlson; Volus Jones; Bill Justice; Judge Whitaker
- Layouts by: Yale Gracey
- Backgrounds by: Thelma Witmer
- Color process: Technicolor
- Production company: Walt Disney Productions
- Distributed by: RKO Radio Pictures
- Release date: December 24, 1948; (US)
- Running time: 6:40
- Country: United States
- Language: English

Tea for Two Hundred is a 1948 American animated short film directed by Jack Hannah. Part of the Donald Duck film series, the film was produced in Technicolor by Walt Disney Productions and released to theaters by RKO Radio Pictures on December 24, 1948. The cartoon stars a picnicking Donald Duck who faces an army of African ants trying to steal his food. Clarence Nash stars as Donald while the ants were voiced by Pinto Colvig. The film includes original music by Oliver Wallace.

Tea for Two Hundred was nominated for an Academy Award for Best Animated Short Film in 1949, but lost to The Little Orphan, an MGM Tom and Jerry film which shared one of 7 Oscars for the Tom and Jerry series. The title of the film is a reference to the song "Tea for Two". Animation from the short was later used in Uncle Donald's Ants (1952).

== Plot ==
While camping in the mountains, Donald Duck sits down to eat a picnic. Soon a line of ants emerges from a nearby bush and marches past Donald, each carrying a grain harvested in the wild. Donald takes interest in the straggler, a small ant who seems to be carrying a bean several times his body weight. Donald begins to test the ant to see how much he can take. The ant, seemingly unaware of Donald, continues to march. Finally Donald balances several food items from his picnic on the ant, which the ant carries. When Donald makes the ant walk a tight rope, Donald plucks the string causing the ant to fall into a large custard pie.

The ant is angry with Donald at first, but when he tastes the pie and sees all of Donald's food, he becomes elated. He enthusiastically runs back to the ant colony and tells the ants about all of Donald's food. The ants call the colony together using mushrooms as hand drums.

Later, while Donald is sleeping against a tree next to his picnic basket, a small team of ants sneak up on him. They open the basket, but Donald, still asleep, instinctively puts his hand over the basket to keep the ants out. Then all of the ants fill in around Donald and pick him up. They carry him over to a cliff where they throw him off into the water and he squawks angrily and races back up the cliff just in time to see the ants are carrying food items out of his basket into their hole and tries to keep them from doing so. The ants huddle and make a plan then faces Donald, who gets ready, exclaiming "Oh, yeah?" as he does. The ants tackle Donald as if they play football. As he tries to grab his food directly from their hole, the ants pull off Donald's shirt as well. He then puts on a barrel to protect his modesty, and uses dynamite to try destroying the anthill. However, the explosion of the dynamite causes a large part of the cliff to fall away and Donald falls into the water a second time.

The ant colony congregates around a large cupcake. The little ant whom Donald had been harassing runs to the top and eats the cherry as the cartoon ends.

== Voice cast ==
- Donald Duck: Clarence Nash
- Ants: Pinto Colvig

== Releases ==
- 1948 - original theatrical release
- 1954 - Disneyland, episode #1.4: "The Donald Duck Story" (TV)
- 1972 - The Mouse Factory, episode #1: "Vacations" (TV)
- c. 1983 - Good Morning, Mickey!, episode #54 (TV)
- c. 1992 - Mickey's Mouse Tracks, episode #18 (TV)

== Home media ==
The short was released on December 11, 2007, on Walt Disney Treasures: The Chronological Donald, Volume Three: 1947-1950.

Additional releases include:

- 1985 - Cartoon Classics - Limited Gold Edition II: Donald's Bee Pictures (VHS)
- 1992 - Cartoon Classics - Special Edition: Happy Summer Days (VHS)
