= Jack Kinney =

American animator, director and producer (1909–1992)

- Born: John Ryan Kinney; March 29, 1909; Utah, U.S.
- Died: February 9, 1992 (aged 82); Glendale, California, U.S.
- Occupations: Animator; film producer; film director
- Years active: 1931–1988
- Employer: Walt Disney Productions (1931–1958)
- Children: 3
- Relatives: Dick Kinney (brother)

John Ryan "Jack" Kinney (March 29, 1909 – February 9, 1992) was an American animator, director and producer of animated shorts. Kinney is the older brother of fellow Disney animator Dick Kinney.

== Early life ==
Jack Kinney was born on March 29, 1909, in Utah. He attended John Muir Junior High School in Los Angeles, California (1925), and John C. Fremont High School (1926 - 1928), at the latter with Roy Williams. Both Fremont football players, they would later be hired by Walt Disney in 1930 to work at the Walt Disney Studio on Hyperion Avenue. Often referring to himself as Kinney's best friend, Williams would go on to star as the "Big Mooseketeer" with head Mouseketeer Jimmie Dodd on the classic 1950s television program, The Mickey Mouse Club (1955–1958).

== Career ==
According to Jeff Lenburg's assessment of him, Kinney was a veteran animator, who spent most of his career working at Walt Disney Productions (later known as the Walt Disney Animation Studios). He directed the first film in the Donald Duck series to win the Academy Award for Best Animated Short Film. Two other films directed by Kinney were nominated for the same award.

Kinney joined the Walt Disney studio on February 9, 1931. He was hired as an animator. He initially inked films for both the Mickey Mouse and Silly Symphony series of the studio. His film credits as an animator include The Band Concert (1935) and The Cookie Carnival (1935). Kinney also served as a story director in films featuring Mickey Mouse and Pluto. His film credits in that role include Brave Little Tailor (1938), Mickey's Trailer (1938) and Society Dog Show (1939).

Kinney served as a sequence director on 10 of the Disney theatrical feature films. His credits in that role included Pinocchio (1940), Dumbo (1941), Saludos Amigos (1942), Victory Through Air Power (1943), The Three Caballeros (1944), Make Mine Music (1946), Fun and Fancy Free (1947), Melody Time (1948), and The Adventures of Ichabod and Mr. Toad (1949).

Beginning in 1940, Kinney was promoted to the position of director for animated short films. Kinney was the primary director of the Goofy series, with his debut being the second entry in the series, Goofy's Glider (1940), all the way up to the final regular entry in the series, How to Sleep (1953), directing a total of 39 entries in the series. His most notable creations for this series were the Goofy How to..., where the character demonstrated how to play various popular sports. Goofy's efforts in these films had "predictably disastrous" results. One of his Goofy cartoons, How to Play Football (1944), was nominated the Academy Award for Best Animated Short Film, one of two entries in the Goofy series to be nominated for the Award. Kinney also directed two entries in the Pluto series, as well as directing four entries in the Donald Duck series, including Der Fuehrer's Face (1943), a wartime satire of Adolf Hitler, the dictator of Nazi Germany, which became the only Donald Duck short to win an Academy Award for Best Animated Short Film, as well being listed as Number 22 in the 1994 book The 50 Greatest Cartoons.

Kinney's other director credits included a number of Walt Disney Specials. Among them were Pigs Is Pigs (1954), Casey Bats Again (1954), and Social Lion (1954). Pigs Is Pigs was nominated for the Academy Award for Best Animated Short Film. It was the third and last film directed by Kinney to be nominated for the Award. Another film credit for Kinney as a director was The Lone Chipmunks (1954). It was the last animated short film of the Chip 'n' Dale series.

From 1954 to 1957, Kinney started directing television animation. He supervised new animation used to tie some of the old shorts together for the Walt Disney anthology television series, which was broadcast by the American Broadcasting Company (ABC). On March 13, 1958, Kinney departed from the Disney studio. He served at the Disney company for 27 years.

After Kinney left Disney, he started an independent animation studio, Kinney-Adelquist Productions, Inc. His partner was Hal Adelquist, another Disney alum. According to animation historian Jeff Lenburg, the company was known as Jack Kinney Productions. Kinney directed an animated feature film for the UPA studio. It was 1001 Arabian Nights (1959) and featured Mr. Magoo.

Kinney next partnered with his own brother Dick Kinney to produce Popeye the Sailor (1960–1961), an animated television series from King Features Syndicate. The series was shot in color. Kinney resurfaced as a story writer for The New Three Stooges (1965), a television series which featured both live-action and animated segments. He was next hired as a story director by Hanna-Barbera, serving in this position from 1978 to 1982. He worked on several Saturday-morning cartoons by the company. Among them were Scooby-Doo and Scrappy-Doo (1979–1980) and The Scooby & Scrappy-Doo/Puppy Hour (1982–1983).

In 1983, Kinney was awarded a Winsor McCay Award, in recognition for his lifetime of contribution to the art of animation. The award was created by the International Animated Film Society (also known as ASIFA-Hollywood).

== Death and legacy ==
In 1988, Kinney published a short memoir, Walt Disney and Assorted Other Characters: An Unauthorized Account of the Early Years at Disney's. The book served as his autobiography. Kinney died on February 9, 1992, in Glendale, California at the age of 82. His death was reported as a death by natural causes.

== Filmography ==
=== Short films ===
- Santa's Workshop (animator - uncredited) (1932)
- Birds in the Spring (animator - uncredited) (1933)
- Ye Olden Days (animator - uncredited) (1933)
- The Mail Pilot (animator - uncredited) (1933)
- Mickey's Mechanical Man (animator - uncredited) (1933)
- The Hot Choc-late Soldiers (animator - uncredited) (1934)
- Two-Gun Mickey (animator - uncredited) (1934)
- The Band Concert (director and animator) (1935)
- Mickey's Service Station (animator) (1935)
- The Cookie Carnival (director and animator) (1935)
- Mickey's Fire Brigade (animator) (1935)
- Cock o' the Walk (animator) (1935)
- Donald and Pluto (writer) (1936)
- Moose Hunters (animator) (1937)
- Mickey's Trailer (writer and director) (1938)
- Mickey's Parrot (writer) (1938)
- Brave Little Tailor (writer and director) (1938)
- Society Dog Show (writer and director) (1939)
- Goofy's Glider (writer and director) (1940)
- Bone Trouble (director) (1940)
- Baggage Buster (director) (1941)
- The Art of Skiing (director) (1941)
- The Art of Self Defense (director) (1941)
- How to Play Baseball (director) (1942)
- The Olympic Champ (director) (1942)
- How to Swim (director) (1942)
- How to Fish (director) (1942)
- Der Fuehrer's Face (director) (1943)
- Figaro and Cleo (director) (uncredited; 1943)
- Victory Vehicles (director) (1943)
- How to Play Golf (director) (1944)
- How to Be a Sailor (writer and director) (1944)
- How to Play Football (director) (1944)
- Hockey Homicide (director) (1945)
- Duck Pimples (director) (1945)
- Californy er Bust (director) (1945)
- African Diary (director) (1945)
- Tiger Trouble (director) (1945)
- The Story of Menstruation (short documentary) (director) (uncredited; 1946)
- Goofy Gymnastics (director) (1949)
- Tennis Racquet (director) (1949)
- Hold That Pose (director) (1950)
- Motor Mania (director) (1950)
- The Brave Engineer (director) (1950)
- How to Ride a Horse (director) (1950)
- Lion Down (director) (1951)
- Father's Lion (director) (1951)
- No Smoking (director) (1951)
- Fathers Are People (director) (1951)
- Get Rich Quick (director) (1951)
- Tomorrow We Diet! (director) (1951)
- Cold War (1951) (director)
- Home Made Home (director) (1951)
- Cold Storage (director) (1951)
- How to Be a Detective (1952)
- Two Weeks Vacation (director) (1952)
- Teachers Are People (director) (1952)
- Two Gun Goofy (director) (1952)
- Man's Best Friend (director) (1952)
- Hello Aloha (director) (1952)
- Donald's Diary (director) (1953)
- How to Sleep (director) (1953)
- Football Now and Then (director) (1953)
- How to dance (director) (1953)
- Father's Week-end (director) (1953)
- For Whom the Bulls Toil (director) (1953)
- Father's Day Off (director) (1953)
- Canvas Back Duck (writer) (1953)
- Two for the Record (director) (1954)
- The Lone Chipmunks (director) (1954)
- Pigs Is Pigs (director) (1954)
- Casey Bats Again (director) (1954)
- Social Lion (director) (1954)
- Chips Ahoy (director) (1955)
- Contrast in Rhythm (director) (1956)
- How to Have an Accident in the Home (writer) (1956)
- How to Have an Accident at Work (writer) (1959)

=== Feature films ===
- Hollywood Party (animator - uncredited) (1934)
- Servants' Entrance (animator - uncredited) (1934)
- Pinocchio (director) (1940)
- The Reluctant Dragon (director) (1941)
- Dumbo (director) (1941)
- Bambi (animator: opening sequence) (1942)
- Saludos Amigos (director: El gaucho Goofy segment; 1942)
- Victory Through Air Power (director) (1943)
- The Three Caballeros (director) (1944)
- Make Mine Music (director: Five of the film's ten segments: The Martins and the Coys, All the Cats Join In, Casey at the Bat, Two Silhouettes, and Johnnie Fedora and Alice Bluebonnet segments; 1946)
- Fun and Fancy Free (director: Bongo segment; 1947)
- Melody Time (director: Bumble Boogie segment; 1948)
- The Adventures of Ichabod and Mr. Toad (director: both The Wind in the Willows and The Legend of Sleepy Hollow segments; 1949)
- Peter Pan (director) (uncredited; 1953)
- 1001 Arabian Nights (director) (1959)
- How to Stuff a Wild Bikini (animator) (1965)
- Song of Norway (animator) (1970)

=== Television ===
- Disneyland (1955-1979)
  - The Goofy Success Story (writer and director; 1955)
  - The Wind in the Willows (director; 1955)
  - The Goofy Sports Story (writer and director; 1956)
  - Pluto's Day (writer; 1956)
  - How to Relax (segment director; 1957)
  - Four Fabulous Characters (segment director; 1957)
  - Adventures in Fantasy (segment director; 1957)
  - Magic and Music (segment director; 1958)
  - Donald's Weekend (story; 1958)
  - This Is Your Life Donald Duck (segment director; 1960)
  - This Is Your Life Donald Duck (sequence director; 1961)
  - Holiday for Henpecked Husbands (sequence director; 1961)
  - Inside Donald Duck (sequence director; 1961)
  - Man Is His Own Worst Enemy (director; 1962)
  - A Square Peg in a Round Hole (sequence director; 1963)
  - Three Tall Tales (sequence director; 1963)
  - In Shape with Von Drake (sequence director; 1964)
  - How the West Was Lost (sequence director; 1967)
  - Baseball Fever (director; 1979)
- Popeye the Sailor (1960-1961) (story: 15 episodes; director and producer: 101 episodes)
- Snuffy Smith and Barney (director: Snuffy's Turf Luck episode; 1963)
- Krazy Kat (director: episode Housewarming; 1963)
- The New 3 Stooges (writer) (1965)
- Scooby-Doo and Scrappy-Doo (director) (1979-1980)
- Mickey Mouse Disco (director) (1980)
- The Flintstone Comedy Show (director) (1980)
  - 1 episode: R.V. Fever/Fred Goes Ape/Quiet Please/Ghost Sitters/Clownfoot/Mouse Cleaning/Birthday Boy
- The Scooby & Scrappy-Doo/Puppy Hour (director) (1982-1983)
- DTV: Golden Oldies (Video) (original material; 1984)
- DTV: Pop & Rock (Video) (original material; 1984)
- DTV: Rock, Rhythm & Blues (Video) (original material; 1984)
- The Walt Disney Comedy and Magic Revue (Video short) (archive footage; 1985)
- DTV Valentine (TV Movie) (original material; 1986)
- American Legends (Video) (segment "The Brave Engineer") (2001)

== Sources ==
- Kinney, Jack, Walt Disney and other assorted characters - An unauthorised account of the early years at Disney's, Harmony Books, New York, 1988
- Lenburg, Jeff (2006), "King, Jack", Who's who in Animated Cartoons: An International Guide to Film and Television's Award-Winning and Legendary Animators, Hal Leonard Corporation, ISBN 978-1557836717
