= Springtime for Pluto =

- Theatrical release poster
- Directed by: Charles Nichols
- Story by: Nick George; Eric Gurney
- Produced by: Walt Disney
- Starring: Pinto Colvig (uncredited); Thurl Ravenscroft (uncredited)
- Music by: Oliver Wallace
- Animation by: George Nicholas; Sandy Strother; Norman Tate; Marvin Woodward; Additional animation: John Lounsbery (uncredited)
- Layouts by: Charles Philippi
- Backgrounds by: Lenard Kester
- Color process: Technicolor
- Production company: Walt Disney Productions
- Distributed by: RKO Pictures
- Release date: June 23, 1944
- Running time: 7 minutes
- Country: United States
- Language: English

Springtime for Pluto is a cartoon made by Walt Disney Productions in 1944. It was directed by Charles Nichols.

== Plot ==
The Spirit of Spring in the form of a faun dances through the countryside playing his panflute and melting the snow, heralding the end of winter and the beginning of spring. When his revitalizing influence reaches Pluto's doghouse, it causes mushrooms to sprout up under Pluto's chin, waking him from his winter slumber.

Pluto enjoys the scent of trees and plays with some of the forest animals, including a caterpillar undergoing its metamorphosis. When the caterpillar finishes its transformation, Pluto dances with the butterfly, which leads him to be attacked by a hive of angry bees. While escaping from the bees, he lands in a bush of poison ivy and suffers a pollen allergy brought on by goldenrod. A strong April shower chases Pluto back to his doghouse. When the storm passes, the Spirit of Spring comes back, frolicking. A bruised and battered Pluto comes out of his doghouse and chases down the unsuspecting faun.

== Voice cast ==
- Pinto Colvig as Pluto
- Thurl Ravenscroft as Singing Caterpillar

== Home media ==
The short was released on December 7, 2004 on Walt Disney Treasures: The Complete Pluto: 1930-1947.
