= Father's Lion =

- Theatrical release poster
- Directed by: Jack Kinney
- Story by: Dick Kinney; Milt Schaffer
- Based on: The Mountain Lion by Robert William Murphy
- Produced by: Walt Disney
- Starring: Pinto Colvig; Bobby Driscoll
- Music by: Joseph Dubin
- Animation by: Edwin Aardal; John Sibley; George Nicholas; Dan MacManus (effects)
- Layouts by: Al Zinnen
- Backgrounds by: Ralph Hulett
- Color process: Technicolor
- Production company: Walt Disney Productions
- Distributed by: RKO Radio Pictures
- Release date: January 4, 1952; (USA)
- Running time: 6:50
- Country: United States
- Language: English

Father's Lion is an animated short film in the Goofy series, produced in Technicolor by Walt Disney Productions and released to theaters on January 4, 1952 by RKO Radio Pictures. The film tells the story of Goofy taking his son camping and teaching him how to hunt. The plotline of the short is a parody of the book, that loosely based on the novel The Mountain Lion by Robert William Murphy.

The film was directed by Jack Kinney and features Pinto Colvig as Goofy and Bobby Driscoll as Goofy's son, Goofy Junior. Voices for the narrator and Louie the Mountain Lion were uncredited.

== Plot ==
Goofy and his son Goofy Jr. are leaving for a camping trip. As they are packing Goofy tells his son all the things he is going to teach him. Goofy's son is very excited and suggests they might shoot a lion. Later as they are driving out to the mountains in their red woodie station wagon, Goofy tells his son about his past adventures. Each story is taken from previous Goofy short films. These include Californy er Bust, Tiger Trouble, and African Diary (all 1945). A common theme throughout the film is Goofy's exaggeration of his adventures. The title of the film is a play on words that could be read "Father's lyin'".

After they arrive the scene cuts to Louie the Mountain Lion fleeing from the sound of gunfire. One bullet comes close enough to part his hair, but in the next scene it is discovered that Goofy was unaware of the lion and merely target practicing with an empty can. The words on the can read "Zinnen Pale" and are a reference to the layout artist Al Zinnen.

Later Goofy and Goofy Jr. set up camp. Goofy ties their meat up on what seems to be a rope to keep it "safe from the little forest creatures", but it turns out to be the lion's tangling tail as he was resting on a tree branch. The lion quickly devours the meat, and when the dry bone is thrown to the ground, Goofy Jr. becomes suspicious that the lion might be present. Goofy Jr. asks if there are animals up in the tree, while the lion lowers his tail hoping for more goodies, but Goofy unknowingly beats the lion up while telling his son what he would do animals in the trees if there were.

Next Goofy teaches his son how to start a fire using a hand drill. The lion sneaks up behind him but Goofy Jr. shoots him with his pop-gun. The continuing gags in the film revolve around Goofy being unaware of the lion while his son is. Goofy Jr. isn't afraid of the lion however, because he thinks Goofy knows about the lion and also because he believes his father's stories about being a great explorer. Meanwhile, the lion makes a continued effort to eat Goofy, but is foiled either by the popgun's cork hitting his nose and making him sneeze or by unintentional, well-timed actions on Goofy's part.

Finally the lion slips into Goofy's sleeping bag, and when Goofy zips up the lion's tail in the zipper the lion reacts in pain and roars. Finally a full on chase begins. At last they rid themselves of the lion long enough to break camp. As they are speeding away in the car, Goofy asks his son "Did I ever tell you about the time I was a race car driver?"

== Voice cast ==
- Goofy: Pinto Colvig
- Junior: Bobby Driscoll
- Louie the Mountain Lion: Jimmy MacDonald

== Releases ==
- 1952 - theatrical release
- 1957 - Disneyland, episode #3.19: "The Adventure Story" (TV)
- c. 1983 - Good Morning, Mickey!, episode #48 (TV)
- c. 1992 - Mickey's Mouse Tracks, episode #58 (TV)
- 1998 - The Ink and Paint Club, episode #1.47: "The Goofy Clan" (TV)

== Home media ==
The short was released on December 2, 2002 on Walt Disney Treasures: The Complete Goofy.

Additional releases include:

- 1984 - "Cartoon Classics: Sport Goofy's Vacation" (VHS)
- 1992 - "Cartoon Classics: Happy Summer Days" (VHS)
- 2006 - "Walt Disney's Funny Factory with Goofy" (DVD)
