= Mickey's Service Station =

1935 Mickey Mouse cartoon

- Directed by: Ben Sharpsteen
- Produced by: Walt Disney
- Starring: Walt Disney; Clarence Nash; Pinto Colvig; Billy Bletcher
- Music by: Leigh Harline
- Animation by: Paul Allen; Art Babbitt; Milt Kahl; Eric Larson; Dick Lundy; Wolfgang Reitherman; Bill Tytla
- Color process: Black-and-white, later colorized
- Production company: Walt Disney Productions
- Distributed by: United Artists
- Release date: March 16, 1935
- Running time: 7:22
- Country: United States
- Language: English

Mickey's Service Station is a 1935 animated short film produced by Walt Disney Productions and released by United Artists. The film, which stars Mickey Mouse, Donald Duck, and Goofy as car mechanics, was also the final black-and-white appearance of Donald, Goofy, and Pete and the penultimate animated black-and-white film produced by Disney after Mickey's Kangaroo which was released later the same year. It was also the first team-up of the classic trio of Mickey, Donald, and Goofy. Mickey's Service Station was directed by Ben Sharpsteen, who at the time had directed only Silly Symphony shorts, and starred the voices of Walt Disney, Clarence Nash, Pinto Colvig, and Billy Bletcher. It was the 74th Mickey Mouse short film to be released, and the third of that year.

The cartoon has been colorized and is available in color on DVD releases.

== Plot ==
Mickey Mouse, Donald Duck, and Goofy are working together at a car service station to fix a broken car. Soon Peg-Leg Pete comes by, and demands that they fix a squeak in his tire. Mickey discovers a grasshopper stuck inside the car. The trio smash several pieces of the car with hammers before Mickey is able to drive away the grasshopper, the car ends up all wrecked and damaged.

The trio then gets to the job of repairing the car, but they end up hurting each other comically. Donald gets hit in the face with car parts, Mickey having problems fixing one of the tires, and Goofy getting his foot stuck in a bucket before slipping like crazy on a pool of oil. When Pete arrives, the car won't start. They tiptoe away while Pete is distracted. They then watch as the car starts beating Pete up and dismantling itself only leaving the engine intact. The engine chases Pete away, it spins around and rams him in the rear end.

== Voice cast ==
- Walt Disney as Mickey Mouse
- Clarence Nash as Donald Duck
- Pinto Colvig as Goofy
- Billy Bletcher as Pete

== Home media ==
The short was released on December 2, 2002, on Walt Disney Treasures: Mickey Mouse in Black and White.

== Legacy ==
Mickey's Service Station introduced Mickey Mouse, Donald Duck, and Goofy as a comedy trio, which would soon become a popular formula for Disney films. Examples include Mickey's Fire Brigade (1935), Moving Day (1936), Moose Hunters, Clock Cleaners, Lonesome Ghosts (1937), Boat Builders, Mickey's Trailer, The Whalers (1938), Tugboat Mickey (1940), and Mickey, Donald, Goofy: The Three Musketeers (2004).

== See also ==
- Mickey Mouse (film series)
