= Moving Day (1936 film) =

1936 Mickey Mouse cartoon

- Film poster
- Directed by: Ben Sharpsteen
- Produced by: Walt Disney; John Sutherland
- Starring: Walt Disney; Clarence Nash; Pinto Colvig; Billy Bletcher
- Music by: Albert Hay Malotte
- Animation by: Paul Allen; Art Babbitt; Al Eugster; Wolfgang Reitherman; Fred Spencer; Don Towsley; Marvin Woodward; Cy Young
- Color process: Technicolor
- Production company: Walt Disney Productions
- Distributed by: United Artists
- Release date: June 20, 1936
- Running time: 9:26
- Country: United States
- Language: English

Moving Day is a 1936 American animated short film produced by Walt Disney Productions and released by United Artists. The cartoon, set during the contemporary Great Depression, follows the antics of Mickey Mouse, Donald Duck, and Goofy as they frantically pack their belongings after being dispossessed from their home. The film was directed by Ben Sharpsteen and includes the voices of Walt Disney as Mickey, Clarence Nash as Donald, Pinto Colvig as Goofy, and Billy Bletcher as Sheriff Pete. It was the 85th Mickey Mouse short to be released, and the eighth of that year.

== Plot ==
Mickey and Donald are six months overdue on their rent payments for their home. Sheriff Pete arrives with a "Notice to Dispossess" authorizing him not only to evict them, but to sell off their belongings as collateral. He furiously strikes a match on Donald's beak to light his cigar and leaves to put out signs advertising cheap furniture.

As Donald and Mickey decide to move before Pete can sell all their belongings, Goofy, employed as an iceman, arrives with a routine delivery. Mickey and Donald decide to have him help with the relocation and request for the use of his truck.

While Mickey struggles with an overloaded suitcase, Goofy tries loading an upright piano onto the truck, but the piano repeatedly rolls out of the truck when he leaves it unattended. Goofy eventually discovers the piano to have a mind of its own and has confrontations with it around the house. Meanwhile, Donald, in his haste to pack everything he sees, grabs a gas heater attached to a gas line in the wall. Seeing the leaking gas, he plugs it with a toilet plunger, but the pressure in the line shoots the plunger into his tail. Donald eventually removes the plunger, but gets stuck in a fish tank.

Just as Donald frees himself, he gets his bill stuck in the leaking gas line. His body fills with gas like a balloon until he shoots off and flies around the room like a rocket. Hearing the commotion, Pete storms into the house to chastise the trio. Unaware of the gas leak, he strikes another match on Donald's beak, triggering an explosion that destroys the house, catapulting all the furniture and items into Goofy's truck with the resulting explosion. As they are driving away in search for a new home, Pete, sitting amid the house's wreckage, yells after them from a second story bathtub, but inadvertently turns on the hot water, leading to another humiliating defeat for him. While Donald laughs at Pete's misfortune, the plunger once again lands on his tail.

== Voice cast ==
- Walt Disney as Mickey Mouse
- Clarence Nash as Donald Duck
- Pinto Colvig as Goofy
- Billy Bletcher as Pete

== Home media ==
The short was released on December 4, 2001 on Walt Disney Treasures: Mickey Mouse in Living Color.

Additional releases include:

- 1986 – "Mickey Knows Best" (VHS)
- 2005 – "Classic Cartoon Favorites: Starring Mickey" (DVD)

== See also ==
- Mickey Mouse (film series)
