= Virgil Partch =

American gag cartoonist

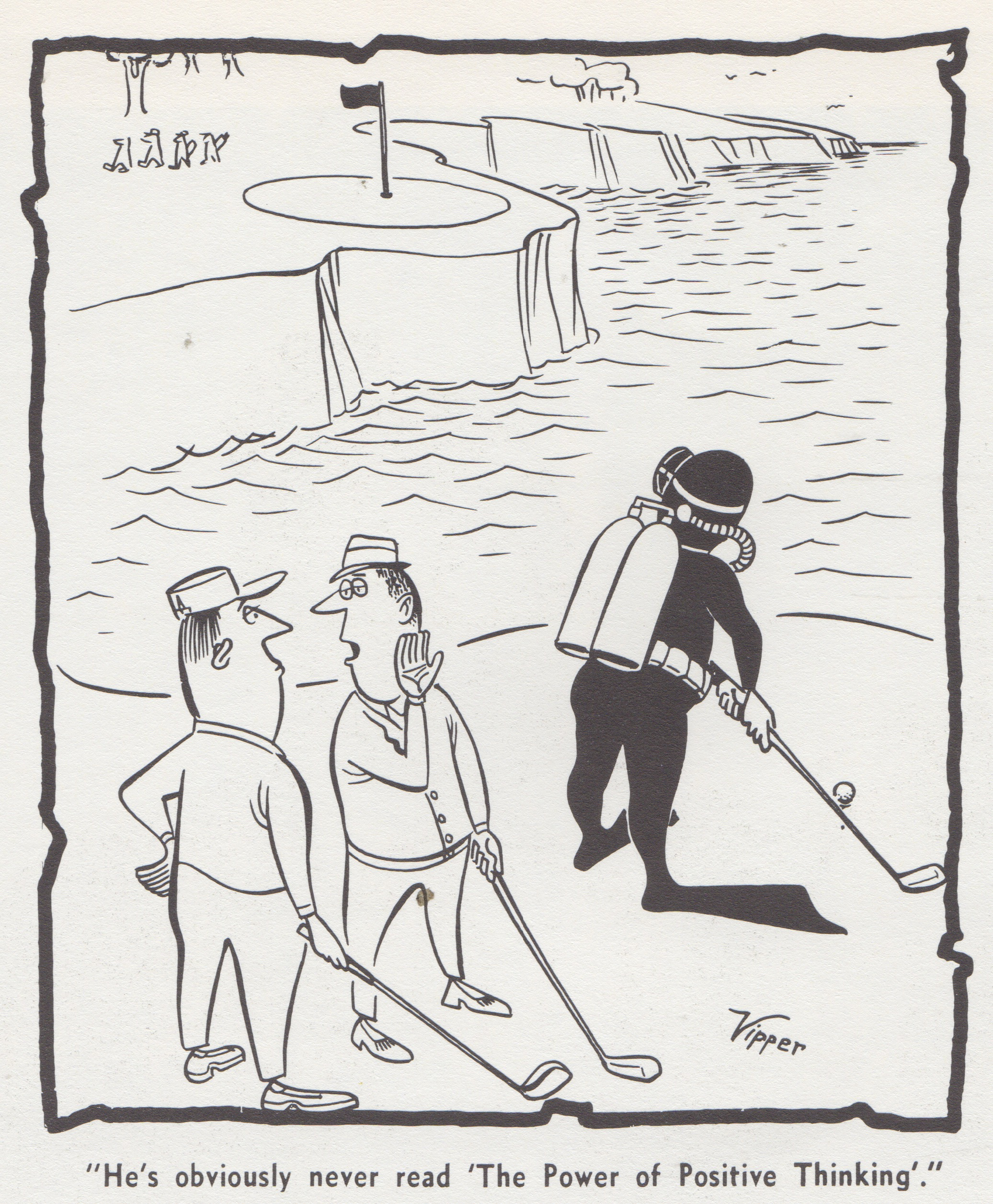
from the program for the Crosby Pro-Am golf tournament, 1964

Virgil Franklin Partch (October 17, 1916 – August 10, 1984), who generally signed his work Vip, was an American gag cartoonist. His work appeared in magazines of the 1940s and 1950s, and he created the newspaper comic strips Big George and The Captain's Gig. He published 19 books of illustrations and drew art for children's books.

Despite being a gagwriter for The New Yorker, his own cartoons were rarely published there because, according to comics historian Bhob Stewart, "New Yorker editor Harold Ross disliked VIP's drawing style."

== Early life and career ==
Born in Alaska, from a mother with the maiden name Pavlof, Partch studied at the University of Arizona and the Chouinard Art Institute in Los Angeles. He later worked for the Disney studios, where he was among those fired after taking part in the Disney animators' strike of 1941. Partch was a co-writer with Dick Shaw on the 1945 Donald Duck short film Duck Pimples. Soon, he began selling gag cartoons to large-circulation magazines, including Collier's, The New Yorker, Playboy, and True. After he left Disney, he worked briefly for Walter Lantz on Woody Woodpecker cartoons.

Partch was drafted into the US Army in 1944, and by the end of his two-year stint had been transferred from the infantry to become art director and cartoonist of the Army's weekly newspaper, the Fort Ord Panorama.

Out of the Army, Partch freelanced for ERA Productions. He published a number of books of single-panel cartoons, some previously published, others done specifically for the books. His 1950 bestseller, Bottle Fatigue, focused on alcohol-themed humor, sold nearly 95,000 hardcover copies by the decade's end.

== Syndicated cartoonist ==
Virgil Partch's The Captain's Gig (September 25, 1977)

Later in his career, Partch drew the successful syndicated comic strip Big George It was a six-day-a-week single panel cartoon about a typical husband when introduced in 1960. He is mainly known for putting surrealist humor and sophistication designs in his works.

Partch created the strip, The Captain's Gig (about a motley bunch of mariners and castaways), syndicated by Field Enterprises. He also illustrated several children's books including The Dog Who Snored Symphonies and The Christmas Cookie Sprinkle Snatcher.

From 1956, Partch lived in a house on the cliffs above Corona del Mar, Newport Beach. He often joined the cartoonists who regularly met at midday in the bar at the White House restaurant on the Pacific Coast Highway in Laguna Beach: Phil and Frank Interlandi, Ed Nofziger, John Dempsey, Don Tobin, Roger Armstrong, Dick Shaw, and Dick Oldden. The gathering began after Phil Interlandi moved to Laguna Beach in 1952. "That was the first bar I walked into in Laguna," Interlandi explained in 1982, "and it became a habit."

== Later life and death ==
In 1979, Partch was awarded the Inkpot Award. With the onset of cataracts, Partch retired from cartooning in January 1984, and donated his collection of 3,700 original cartoons to the University of California, Irvine library. Partch and his wife died in an auto accident August 10, 1984, on Interstate 5 near Valencia, California. Partch was 67 years old at the time. Due to his aggressive creative efforts, at the time of his death he left behind enough "Big George" panels for the feature to continue for six more years of new material.

His cousin was the composer Harry Partch.
