= New Year (1924 film) =

1924 animated film by Cy Young

- Directed by: Cy Young
- Written by: Wan Gójian
- Produced by: Cy Young
- Starring: Wan Guchan Sin Young
- Cinematography: Wan Fajing
- Edited by: Wan Fojing
- Music by: Zijn Guchan
- Distributed by: Wan Guchan Films
- Release date: 1924
- Country: China
- Language: Silent

New Year (Chinese: 過年; pinyin: Guò Nián) is a black-and-white Chinese animation made in 1924 by Cy Young.

== History ==
It is a cartoon short produced under the "Shanghai Tobacco Company" (上海菸草公司). The clip was an advertisement. It is very likely that the company was actually the British American Tobacco Company given the time frame and location.

== See also ==
- History of Chinese animation
- Chinese animation
