= Music Land =

- Directed by: Wilfred Jackson
- Written by: Pinto Colvig; Earl Hurd; Ted Sears
- Produced by: Walt Disney
- Music by: Leigh Harline
- Production company: Walt Disney Productions
- Distributed by: United Artists
- Release date: October 5, 1935
- Running time: 10 minutes
- Country: United States
- Language: English

Music Land is a Silly Symphonies animated short film produced by Walt Disney and released in 1935.

== Plot ==
The short begins by showing a map of Music Land, before zooming in to show the Land of Symphony, a massive classical-themed kingdom where the princess (an anthropomorphized violin) grows bored with the slow ballroom dancing and sneaks out.

Across the Sea of Discord is the Isle of Jazz, a giant jazz-themed kingdom alive with hot jazz music and dancing, but the prince (an alto saxophone) takes little interest in it. Sneaking out, he spots the princess across the sea with the aid of a clarinet-telescope, and instantly falls in love with her. He quickly travels across the sea on a xylophone boat to meet her.

Their flirting is interrupted, however, when the princess' mother (a tenor violin) sends her guards to lock the prince in a metronome prison tower. To escape this predicament, he writes a note for help (the melody of "The Prisoner's Song") and passes it to a bird, which brings it to his father (a bass saxophone), who raises the battle cry - a jazz version of the military tune "Assembly".

The Isle of Jazz deploys its multi-piece band as artillery, bombarding a quarter of the Land of Symphony with explosive musical notes to a jazz/swing number. The Land of Symphony returns fire via organ pipes that rotate into cannons, launching and roaring extremely loud and furious musical interceptors to the refrains of Wagner's "Ride of the Valkyries".

The princess intervenes to stop the war by waving the flag of surrender, but falls into the sea when a symphony note hits her boat. The prince struggles to escape his cell, but an explosive note helps him by landing next to it and blowing it up, and he rushes to save her, but ends up struggling as well. Both parents see what is happening and quickly cease fire to rescue their children. When they finally save their children, separate them from each other, and start to glare at each other, the king starts taking a liking to the queen, and they decide to make peace via handshake. The story ends on a happy note with a double wedding, between the prince and princess, and the king and queen, presided over by a double bass minister, as the citizens of both lands dance on the newly built Bridge of Harmony and a rainbow with musical notes all over it appears in the sky as the Land of Symphony rebuilds itself.

== Production ==
In an attempt to bridge the gap between classical music and jazz, the short features music from Beethoven's Eroica and Wagner's "Ride of the Valkyries", as well as various popular classical, jazz, and miscellaneous tunes. The film contains no actual speech, but has the characters instead communicate with musical tones, with each 'speaking' through use of the sound of the particular instrument upon which they are based.

According to Leonard Maltin, the film's story originated in the genuine musical dilemma of American society; some people in the 1930s viewed jazz as the end of civilization, similar to how some parents today tend to be perplexed by their children's music interests. Incidentally, the saxophone prince's father is a caricature of the "King of Jazz", Paul Whiteman.

The film was edited into a Walt Disney Presents episode titled "Toot, Whistle, Plunk and Boom" (after the 1953 short) in 1959 with reorchestrated music and narration by Professor Owl (Bill Thompson), and was featured in Walt Disney Cartoon Classics Limited Gold Edition II: The Disney Dream Factory (1985), The Best of Disney: 50 Years of Magic (1991), Songs of the Silly Symphonies (2001), and The Making of 'Pinocchio': No Strings Attached (2009). Since then, the Walt Disney Presents episode, "Toot, Whistle, Plunk and Boom" and its reorchesrated version of the cartoon, Music Land, had been long forgotten.

In an exhibition of "some of the most inspired and memorable uses of classical music in animation", the film was screened in its entirety at 'What's Opera, Doc? – Animation and Classical Music' as part of the 'Marc Davis Celebration of Animation' hosted by the Academy of Motion Picture Arts and Sciences at the Samuel Goldwyn Theater in Beverly Hills in May 2010.

== Recognition ==
The Austin Chronicle writes that as one of the earliest of the Silly Symphonies, "Music Land is a place fraught with tension, with the Sea of Discord lying between the Isle of Jazz and the Land of Symphony", and that the action is hardly as dramatic as Saving Private Ryan. It is noted that "it is the first glimpse, as well, of a critical aspect of animating inanimates: how to use an object's structural particulars -- the tuning peg on a cello, the mouthpiece on a saxophone -- to best effect."

In Dictionary of Films by Georges Sadoul and Peter Morris, it is offered that the film has "an extraordinary range of graphic design and an imaginative use of sound."

== Home media ==
The short has been released several times on VHS, the first time in 1985 on Walt Disney Cartoon Classics: Limited Gold Edition II - The Disney Dream Factory: 1933-1938 and 1991's Walt Disney Mini-Classics: Peter and the Wolf.

It first released in 2000 as a bonus feature on Make Mine Music, on December 4, 2001, on Walt Disney Treasures: Silly Symphonies - The Historic Musical Animated Classics. It is included in 2005's Walt Disney's Classic Cartoon Favorites: Volume 6 - Extreme Music Fun. It released on Blu-ray on the 2009 Blu-ray Diamond Edition of Snow White and the Seven Dwarfs and 2010 Diamond Edition Blu-ray of Beauty and the Beast.
