= Society Dog Show =

1939 Mickey Mouse cartoon

- Poster
- Directed by: Bill Roberts
- Story by: Jack Kinney
- Produced by: Walt Disney
- Starring: Walt Disney; Lee Millar; J. Donald Wilson
- Music by: Oliver Wallace
- Animation by: Al Eugster; Norman Ferguson; Shamus Culhane; John Lounsbery; Les Clark; Clyde Geronimi; Arnold Gillespie; Winfield Hoskins; Dick Lundy; John McManus; Fred Moore; Lee Morehouse; Ray Patin; George Rowley; Leo Salkin; Milt Schaffer; Cornett Wood; Marvin Woodward; Cy Young
- Color process: Technicolor
- Production company: Walt Disney Productions
- Distributed by: RKO Radio Pictures
- Release date: February 3, 1939
- Running time: 8 minutes
- Country: United States
- Language: English

Society Dog Show is a Mickey Mouse cartoon short produced by Walt Disney Productions and released by RKO Radio Pictures on February 3, 1939. The animated short was directed by Bill Roberts and animated by Al Eugster, Shamus Culhane, Fred Moore, John Lounsbery, Norm Ferguson, and Leo Salkin. It was the 104th short in the Mickey Mouse film series to be released, and the first for that year.

In the short, Pluto's romantic partner is Fifi, a Pekingese who also appears in Puppy Love (1933), Pluto's Quin-puplets (1937), and Mickey's Surprise Party (1939).

== Plot ==
Mickey Mouse enters Pluto in a ritzy dog show. The two arrive there in a makeshift wooden car. While Mickey grooms Pluto, Pluto starts swooning over Fifi the Peke. When Pluto is called to the judge's stand, Mickey quickly retrieves him. Things don't look good for Mickey and Pluto after he attacks the judge (due to him being rude to Pluto), resulting in the two getting kicked out. Upon hearing trick dogs coming onstage to perform, Mickey decides to reenter Pluto in the dog show as a trick dog, but Pluto is nervous about the idea. When a photographer attempts to take a picture of the trick dogs, the camera's flash powder ignites a curtain, causing a fire to break out in the building. Fifi gets stuck under a fallen microphone stand. As Mickey is about to go back in with Pluto as a roller skating dog, a crowd of people and dogs run out. Pluto hears Fifi and bravely goes in, still wearing his roller skates. Mickey tries to follow, but is stopped by falling debris. After hitting a column and narrowly avoiding a collapsing part of the floor and a falling wall, Pluto skates his way across wooden beams and saves Fifi just before the floor that she's on gives way. They escape the burning building by crashing through a window and land on a drain pipe that folds down like a spring and launches them out onto the street. Mickey and the others gather around Pluto and the judge awards Pluto with a medal as everyone cheers for him, hailing him as a hero. Pluto then uses his ear to pull Fifi behind the medal, presumably sharing a kiss.

== Home media ==
The short was released on May 18, 2004, on Walt Disney Treasures: Mickey Mouse in Living Color, Volume Two: 1939-Today.

== Notes ==
- The cartoon is notable in that it was the last appearance of Mickey's older character design, primarily the dotted eyes in the design.
- There was later a comic strip based on this short by Floyd Gottfredson although the comic strip was portrayed quite differently than the cartoon.

== See also ==
- Mickey Mouse (film series)
