= Clown of the Jungle =

1947 Donald Duck cartoon

- Theatrical release poster
- Directed by: Jack Hannah
- Story by: Ray Patin; Payne Thebaut
- Produced by: Walt Disney
- Starring: Clarence Nash; Pinto Colvig
- Music by: Oliver Wallace
- Animation by: Andy Engman; Volus Jones; Bill Justice; Hal King
- Layouts by: Yale Gracey
- Backgrounds by: Thelma Witmer
- Color process: Technicolor
- Production company: Walt Disney Productions
- Distributed by: RKO Radio Pictures
- Release date: June 20, 1947
- Running time: 6:19
- Country: United States
- Language: English

Clown of the Jungle is a 1947 American animated short film directed by Jack Hannah and produced by Walt Disney, featuring Donald Duck. It marks the first short film appearance of the Aracuan Bird, previously seen in The Three Caballeros (1944). In the short film, Donald Duck is visiting the jungle to photograph its tropical birds, but things take a turn for the worse when Donald encounters the extremely annoying Aracuan Bird.

== Plot ==
In the South American jungle, the narrator introduces us to the various exotic birds living there, and to wildlife photographer Donald Duck intent on getting some pictures. However, all his attempts to photograph birds are ruined by the "clown of the jungle", the Aracuan Bird. For example, when Donald attempts to photograph a chorus line of hummingbirds, the Aracuan Bird interrupts the picture with a Russian prisiadki. Donald becomes aggravated to the point where he gives chase, but the bird always manages to outsmart Donald and make short work of his sanity.

== Voice cast ==
- Clarence Nash as Donald Duck
- Pinto Colvig as Aracuan Bird

== Television ==
- Mickey's Mouse Tracks, episode #54
- Donald's Quack Attack, episode #64
- From All of Us to All of You (Sweden only; previously also in Norway in edited form)

== Home media ==
The short was released on December 11, 2007, on Walt Disney Treasures: The Chronological Donald, Volume Three: 1947-1950 where the opening theme uses the cut-short 1947 Donald Duck theme instead of the first Mickey Mouse theme it originally used.

Additional releases include:

- Donald's Birthday Bash (VHS)

== Notes ==
- The hammer sound from Roustabouts (a song from Disney's 1941 film Dumbo) can be heard when Donald and the Aracuan Bird are hammering a nail.
- When Donald goes insane and starts acting like the Aracuan Bird at the very end, he breaks the fourth wall by walking along the black iris and shrinking with it.
