= Norman Ferguson =

Norman or Norm Ferguson may refer to:

- Norm Ferguson (animator) (1902–1957)
- Norm Ferguson (ice hockey) (born 1945)
