= On Ice (film) =

1935 Mickey Mouse cartoon

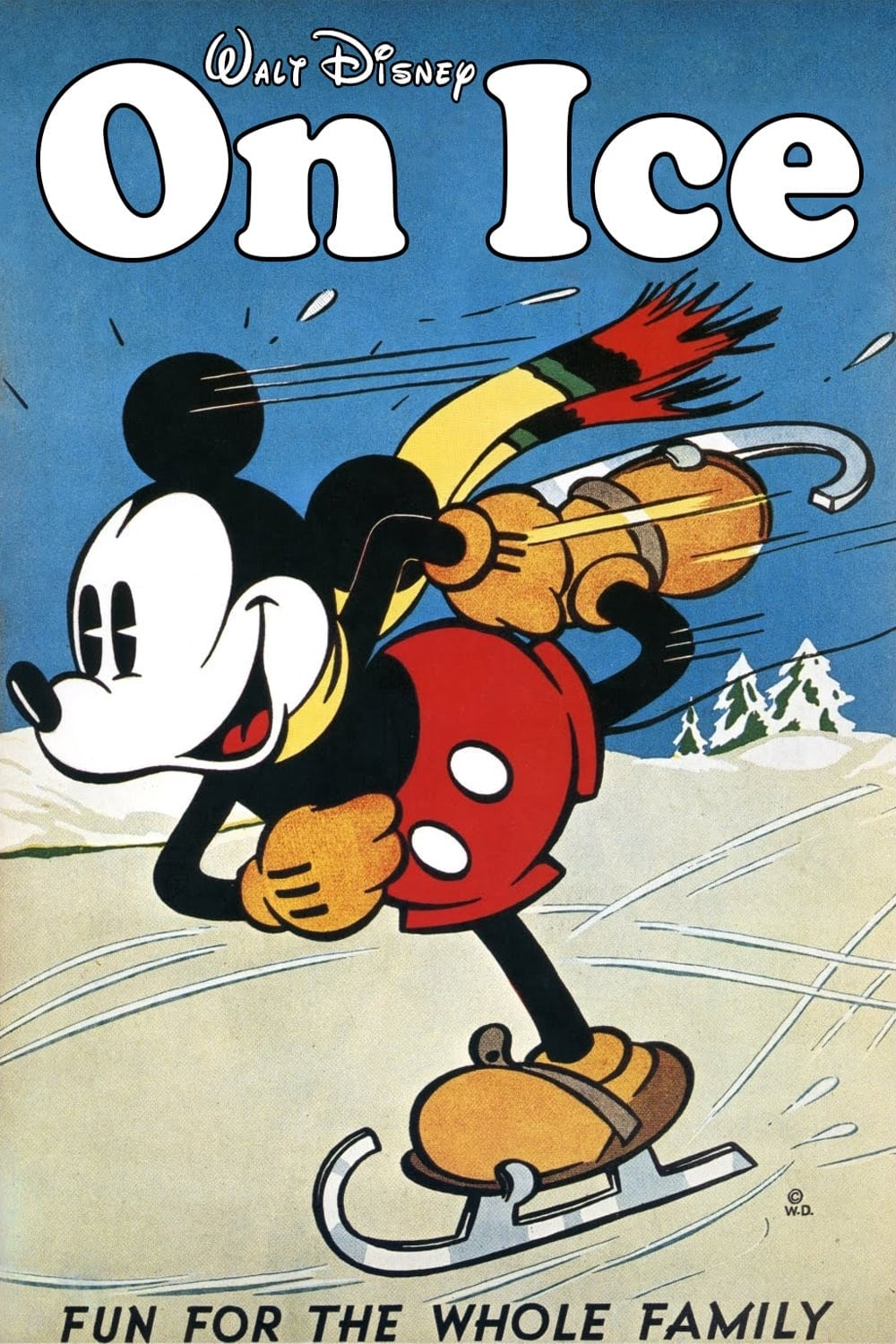
- Directed by: Ben Sharpsteen
- Story by: Webb Smith
- Produced by: Walt Disney
- Starring: Marcellite Garner; Pinto Colvig; Walt Disney; Clarence Nash
- Music by: Bert Lewis; Leigh Harline; Frank Churchill
- Animation by: Paul Allen; Milt Kahl; Fred Spencer; Art Babbitt; Johnny Cannon; Norm Ferguson; Eric Larson; John McManus; Don Towsley; Marvin Woodward
- Color process: Technicolor
- Production company: Walt Disney Productions
- Distributed by: United Artists
- Release date: September 28, 1935
- Running time: 8 minutes
- Country: United States
- Language: English

On Ice is a 1935 theatrical cartoon short in the Mickey Mouse film series, produced by Walt Disney Animation Studios. It was the 79th Mickey Mouse short film to be released, and the eighth of that year.

== Plot ==
The cartoon revolves around three different storylines that all take place on a frozen lake during wintertime. In the first, Mickey helps Minnie learn how to skate. The second storyline has Goofy attempting to catch fish by dropping tobacco into the water and making the fish come up to spit. Donald pulls a prank on Pluto by putting ice skates on his feet and luring him out onto the ice in the third one. The subplots come together when Donald skates around with a kite on his back. The wind kicks up and sends him flying over the waterfall. Mickey hears his cries for help and saves him by pulling on the yarns of his sweater, sending him flying. Donald ends up landing right where Goofy is fishing.

== Voice cast ==
- Mickey Mouse: Walt Disney
- Goofy: Pinto Colvig
- Minnie Mouse: Marcellite Garner
- Donald Duck: Clarence Nash
- Pluto: Pinto Colvig

== Home media ==
The short was released on December 4, 2001, on Walt Disney Treasures: Mickey Mouse in Living Color, on December 7, 2004, on Walt Disney Treasures: The Complete Pluto: 1930-1947, on bonus on the 2011 Diamond edition blu-ray of Bambi and on February 7, 2023, on Mickey & Minnie: 10 Classic Shorts - Volume 1.

== See also ==
- Mickey Mouse (film series)
