= Donald's Golf Game =

1938 Donald Duck cartoon

- Theatrical release poster
- Directed by: Jack King
- Story by: Jack Hannah; Carl Barks
- Produced by: Walt Disney
- Starring: Clarence Nash
- Music by: Oliver Wallace
- Animation by: Preston Blair; Dick Lundy; Ed Love; Fred Spencer
- Color process: Technicolor
- Production company: Walt Disney Productions
- Distributed by: RKO Radio Pictures
- Release date: November 4, 1938
- Running time: 7:30
- Country: United States
- Language: English

Donald's Golf Game is a Donald Duck cartoon produced by by Walt Disney Productions and released by RKO Radio Pictures in 1938. Donald falters on the fairway while his caddies Huey, Dewey, and Louie all try to "tee" him off, with a grasshopper and a bag of trick clubs.

== Plot ==
Donald Duck is taking his three nephews Huey, Dewey, and Louie to a golf course to play golf. After his nephews build a stand made of sand, Donald prepares to swing but is interrupted by a tweeting songbird. Donald tells the bird to be quiet and it does. Before Donald can swing, he is interrupted again, this time by his nephews blowing into tissues. Angrily, Donald hushes them and sticks clips on their bills, only to have them thrown off and hit Donald (one in the tail). In a rage, Donald breaks his club and is offered a trick club by his nephews. Donald hits the golf ball only to find out that the "club" is actually a net and the ball is in the net right behind him. Donald gets another trick club which becomes an umbrella, creates a fake rainstorm, and pops out a fake bee.

Unable to stand the tricks any longer, Donald orders his nephews off the field. They soon find a grasshopper, however, and put it in a ball to make another trick for Donald. When Donald hits the ball, it bounces away all by itself instead of rolling. Donald chases after it and drives it into the golf pond. Huey, Dewey, and Louie offer him a raft to follow it but before Donald can catch the ball, they pull a valve making the raft deflate. Donald falls into the pond headfirst and tries to hit the ball from underwater. He hits it out of the water and follows it, only to discover that there is a grasshopper in it. The grasshopper bounces away and Donald follows, only to be trapped when his deflated raft (which he is still wearing around his waist) ties up around him after he trips.

His nephews then begin playing their own game, hitting their balls between poles (and using Donald's head as a bounce-off stand) to get them into the holes. In a rage after they walk over him, Donald breaks free of the raft and throws his club at them, intending to hit them on the heads, but it turns into a boomerang and hits him instead, throwing him into the hole and leaving him shouting in rage (from inside the hole).

Donald Duck winds up to hit the ball.

== Voice cast ==
- Clarence Nash as Donald Duck, Huey, Dewey and Louie

== Releases ==
- This short was one of the many featured in Donald Duck's 50th Birthday, but the clip is shown in French to show Donald's international appeal.
- 1938 - theatrical release
- c. 1992 - Mickey's Mouse Tracks, episode #26 (TV)
- 1997 - The Ink and Paint Club, episode #1.20: "Huey, Dewey and Louie" (TV)

== Home media ==
The short was released on May 18, 2004 on Walt Disney Treasures: The Chronological Donald, Volume One: 1934-1941.

Additional releases include:

- 1981 - "Mickey Mouse and Donald Duck Cartoon Collections Volume One" (VHS)
- 1992 - "Cartoon Classics Special Edition: The Goofy World of Sports" (VHS)
- 2006 - "Funny Factory with Donald" (DVD)
- 2019 - "Disney+" (streaming)
