= Duck Pimples =

1945 Donald Duck cartoon

- Theatrical release poster
- Directed by: Jack Kinney
- Story by: Virgil Partch; Dick Shaw
- Produced by: Walt Disney
- Starring: Clarence Nash; Billy Bletcher; Mary Lenihan; Harry E. Lang; Jack Mather; Doodles Weaver
- Music by: Oliver Wallace
- Animation by: Andy Engman; Hal King; John Sibley; Milt Kahl; Fred Moore (uncredited); Al Bertino (uncredited); Marc Davis (uncredited)
- Layouts by: Don DaGradi
- Backgrounds by: Nino Carbe
- Color process: Technicolor
- Production company: Walt Disney Productions
- Distributed by: RKO Radio Pictures
- Release date: August 10, 1945
- Running time: 7:44
- Country: United States
- Language: English

Duck Pimples is a 1945 animated whodunit short film produced by Walt Disney Productions and released by RKO Radio Pictures. The cartoon parodies radio crime stories and film noir dramas.

== Plot ==
On a dark and stormy night, Donald Duck attempts to relax by listening to serials on the radio, but the shows playing on each station are dark and disturbing. Turning off the radio, Donald is met at the door by an intimidating looking man who turns out to be a traveling book salesman. The salesman disappears, but leaves behind numerous books. Donald begins to read a crime novel.

As Donald reads, he finds the book manifesting into his living room. The world of the novel surrounds Donald, and he finds himself the prime suspect in the story's thievery and kidnapping plot, having to navigate numerous colorful characters. Donald ultimately finds himself back in his living room, where a voice tells him it was all just his imagination.

== Censorship ==
Scenes where Donald is threatened with a knife and the detective is threatened with an axe were at one time cut, but have since been restored for the VHS and DVD releases.

== Voice cast ==
- Donald Duck: Clarence Nash
- Radio actor/Salesman/Dopey Davis/J. Harold King/Donald's conscience: Jack Mather
- Pauline: Mary Lenihan
- Radio host: Doodles Weaver
- Leslie J. Clark: Harry E. Lang
- Radio actor/H. U. Hennessy: Billy Bletcher

== Home media ==
The short was released on December 6, 2005, on Walt Disney Treasures: The Chronological Donald, Volume Two: 1942-1946.

== Reception ==
Cartoon Brew called Duck Pimples "the creepiest Disney short ever made" and its animation a "top-drawer work".

== Notes ==
- Several of the characters' names are spoofs on the names of Disney staff members. H.U. Hennesy is a spoof on Disney artist Hugh Hennesy, J. Harold King probably refers to director Jack King, and Leslie J. Clark is a play on the name of another Disney artist, Les Clark.
- The main title has the word "Goose" crossed out and "Duck" written in.
