= Donald's Lucky Day =

1939 Donald Duck cartoon

- Theatrical release poster
- Directed by: Jack King
- Story by: Carl Barks
- Produced by: Walt Disney
- Music by: Oliver Wallace
- Animation by: Paul Allen; Johnny Cannon; Jim Carmichael
- Color process: Technicolor
- Production company: Walt Disney Productions
- Distributed by: RKO Radio Pictures
- Release date: January 13, 1939; (USA)
- Running time: 8 minutes
- Language: English

Donald's Lucky Day is a 1939 Donald Duck cartoon produced by Walt Disney Productions.

== Plot ==
In a harborside building on a foggy night (February 13), which happens to fall on Friday the 13th, two criminals prepare a gift bomb for someone named "Scarpuss" at "1313 13th Street" for Valentine's Day. Donald Duck is hired to deliver the package, being unaware of the bomb it contains. Complications arise when a black cat crosses his path, but fortunately for Donald, the cat ends up knocking the bomb into the water of the harbor, and he survives.

== Voice cast ==
- Donald Duck: Clarence Nash
- Black Cat: Purv Pullen

== Release ==
While the cartoon was completed by spring 1938, RKO held back the release until January 1939, the next occurrence of Friday the 13th.

== Reception ==
Motion Picture Herald reviewed the short on October 11, 1938: "The fowl is a messenger boy this time, commissioned to deliver an infernal machine on Friday the 13th. His errand is stymied by a playful but very black cat which is unintentionally but most amusingly instrumental in preventing Donald's death by dynamite. Donald is less quarrelsome and a deal more understandable than commonly. It is one of his best appearances."

== Home media ==
The short was released on May 18, 2004, on Walt Disney Treasures: The Chronological Donald, Volume One: 1934-1941.
