= Mickey's Fire Brigade =

1935 Mickey Mouse cartoon

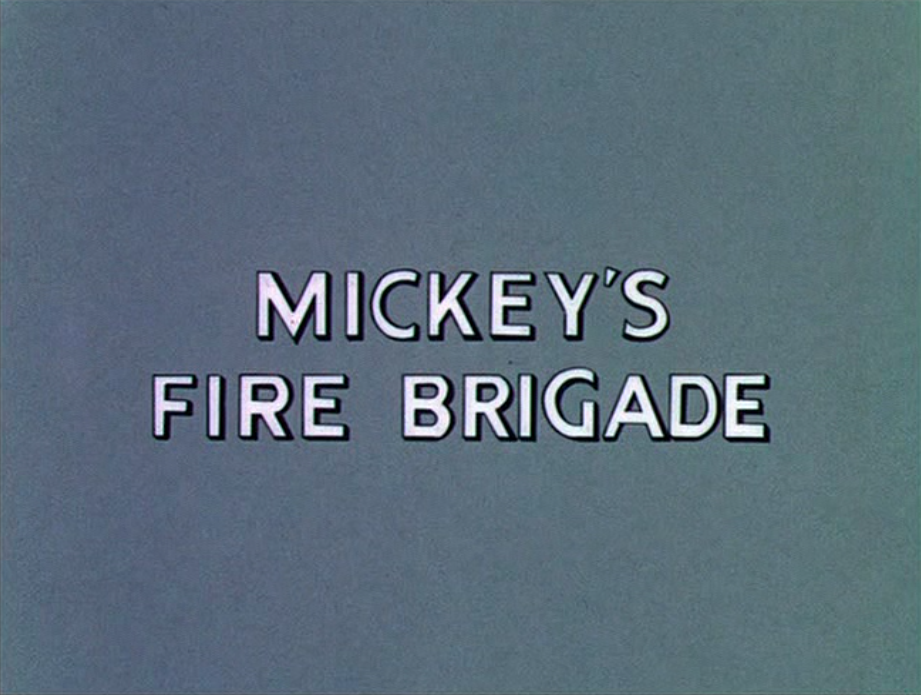
- Title screen
- Directed by: Ben Sharpsteen
- Produced by: Walt Disney
- Starring: Elvia Allman; Pinto Colvig; Walt Disney; Clarence Nash
- Music by: Bert Lewis
- Animation by: Paul Allen; Grim Natwick; Fred Spencer; Bill Tytla; Cy Young; Milt Schaffer; Johnny Cannon; Roy Williams; Nick George; Don Towsley; Leonard Sebring; Marvin Woodward; John McManus; Wolfgang Reitherman; Jack Kinney; Eric Larson
- Color process: Technicolor
- Production company: Walt Disney Productions
- Distributed by: United Artists
- Release date: August 3, 1935
- Running time: 8 minutes
- Country: United States
- Language: English

Mickey's Fire Brigade is a 1935 American animated short film produced by Walt Disney Productions and released by United Artists. The cartoon stars Mickey Mouse, Donald Duck, and Goofy employed as firefighters responding to a hotel fire. It was directed by Ben Sharpsteen and features the voices of Walt Disney as Mickey, Clarence Nash as Donald, Pinto Colvig as Goofy, and Elvia Allman as Clarabelle Cow. It was the 77th Mickey Mouse short to be released, and the sixth of that year.

== Plot ==
Mickey Mouse, Donald Duck, and Goofy are firefighters responding to a hotel fire. Mickey drives a contemporary style hook-and-ladder fire truck, Donald is standing on the stack of ladders on the truck shouting "Fire! Fire! Fire!", while Goofy is steering the rear of the truck.

The three fire fighters arrive at the hotel and go to work. The film is filled with gags which show the trio to be inept firemen, and that the fire and smoke to have minds of their own.

Finally, Mickey realizes that there is a woman upstairs who needs saving. They find Clarabelle Cow locked in the bathroom taking a bath and singing to herself, unaware that the hotel is on fire. After Goofy unsuccessfully warns her through the transom, Mickey and Donald break the door down using Goofy as a battering ram. Clarabelle is alarmed and thinks that Mickey, Donald, and Goofy are kidnappers. As Clarabelle is screaming for the police and hitting them with her scrub brush, the three firefighters lift her bathtub, with Clarabelle still in it, and shove it out the window.

Clarabelle sails through the air in her tub and slides down a ladder onto the fire truck. The three firefighters then land in the bathtub whereupon Clarabelle begins smacking them with her scrub brush.

== Voice cast ==
- Mickey Mouse: Walt Disney
- Donald Duck: Clarence Nash
- Goofy: Pinto Colvig
- Clarabelle Cow: Elvia Allman

== Releases ==
- 1935 - original theatrical release
- 1943 - The Fireman (8mm)
- 1998 - Ink & Paint Club, episode #1.59 "Clarabelle and Horace" (TV)

== Home media ==
The short was released on December 4, 2001 on Walt Disney Treasures: Mickey Mouse in Living Color.

Additional releases include:

- 1984 - "Mickey's Crazy Careers" (VHS)
- 1992 - "Fun on the Job" (VHS)

== See also ==
- Mickey Mouse (film series)
- Mickey & Donald, a 1982 Game & Watch game with Mickey, Donald and Goofy as firefighters
