= Donald and Pluto =

1936 Donald Duck cartoon

- Theatrical release poster
- Directed by: Ben Sharpsteen
- Produced by: Walt Disney
- Starring: Clarence Nash; Lee Millar
- Music by: Frank Churchill; Paul J. Smith
- Animation by: Al Eugster; Shamus Culhane; Fred Spencer; Bill Roberts
- Color process: Technicolor
- Production company: Walt Disney Productions
- Distributed by: United Artists
- Release date: September 12, 1936
- Country: United States
- Language: English

Donald and Pluto is a 1936 animated short film produced by Walt Disney Productions and distributed by United Artists. The film stars Donald Duck, employed as a plumber, and Mickey's dog Pluto as his assistant. The film was directed by Ben Sharpsteen and featured the voice of Clarence Nash as Donald.

Donald and Pluto is one of the three installments of the Mickey Mouse series in which Mickey doesn't appear as a character, the others are 1937's Don Donald and Modern Inventions. The cartoon also introduced Fred Spencer's new design for Donald Duck, which included a slimmer body, shorter neck, rounder feet, and a shorter beak.

== Plot ==
Donald is a plumber fixing pipes in the basement of a house. Donald first has trouble with pulling his hammer off a magnet, which it gets stuck to. When he unscrews the lid covering the pipe, water spurts out and hits Donald in the face, angering him. To stop the flow, Donald uses the magnet to pull a larger hammer toward himself, which he uses to put on another lid to the hole. In doing so, he accidentally wakes Pluto and later accidentally pulls Pluto's bone away from him. While Pluto wrestles with the magnet to get his bone back, he swallows the magnet and gets his bone stuck to his bottom. As he fights to get the bone, he tumbles into the pile of furniture Donald is standing on, causing Donald to come crashing to the ground. Pluto eventually runs into the kitchen and the magnet inside him causes many cooking items to be pulled onto his rear.

Pluto's erratic actions eventually cause the dishes to fall off, but his bone continues getting stuck to him and annoying him. As he tries to get it off, he backs into the clock and gets stuck to it. After breaking free of the clock by destroying it, he pulls a much smaller alarm clock to him. He engages in a fight with the clock, soon realizing that if he makes minor movements along the wall rear-end first, the clock won't come to him. However, he trips over a rolling pin and the clock sticks to him again, but he loses it in a polar bear rug. His dish sticks to him again and the magnetism causes knives and forks to come out of a drawer and chase him. The chase eventually causes Pluto to end up in the basement again. There, the magnet inside him sucks the nails out of the ladder Donald is standing on, causing it to fall apart under his feet. Donald falls into a tank and is pulled out through a wringer. After an angry outburst, he gets stuck to Pluto's bottom and is dragged into the roof of the basement.

Pluto is chased by the angry Donald through the house and onto the roof, where the magnetism causes Donald to be pulled into the roof and along the ceiling with the floor separating the two (it looks as if there is an invisible track Donald is hanging from). Donald is dragged into a ceiling fan, activating it and spinning both Donald and Pluto around. Donald gets an electric shock when he pulls out a lamp and is later bumped across the ceiling when Pluto crawls over a ladder. Pluto eventually makes his way downstairs where Donald falls back to the ground and bounces back into the basement when he is pinned to the wall by his own tools. Pluto finds him and begins happily licking him as he squawks angrily.

== Voice cast ==
- Donald Duck: Clarence Nash
- Pluto: Lee Millar

== Home media ==
The short was released on May 18, 2004 on Walt Disney Treasures: The Chronological Donald, Volume One: 1934-1941.

== Notes ==
The running gag of Pluto licking Donald is reused in Beach Picnic in 1939.

== See also ==
- Mickey Mouse (film series)
