= Playful Pluto =

1934 Mickey Mouse cartoon

- Pluto struggles with a piece of flypaper.
- Directed by: Burt Gillett
- Produced by: Walt Disney
- Starring: Walt Disney; Pinto Colvig
- Music by: Frank Churchill; Larry Morey; Paul J. Smith
- Animation by: Character animation: Norman Ferguson; Dick Lundy; Art Babbitt
- Color process: Black and white Color (1991 computer colorized edition)
- Production company: Walt Disney Productions
- Distributed by: United Artists
- Release date: March 3, 1934
- Running time: 7 minutes 40 seconds
- Country: United States
- Language: English

Playful Pluto is a 1934 Walt Disney cartoon, directed by Burt Gillett. It was the 65th Mickey Mouse short film, and the third of that year.

== Plot ==
While Mickey Mouse is working in his garden, Pluto keeps bothering and interrupting him. After a while, Pluto swallows a flashlight and gets stuck on a piece of flypaper.

== Voice cast ==
- Mickey Mouse: Walt Disney
- Pluto: Pinto Colvig
- Fly: unknown

== Legacy ==
The cartoon is well known for a classic scene where Pluto gets stuck on a sticky piece of flypaper. This scene, animated by Norm Ferguson, has been described as vital in the history of character animation, because for the first time an animated character really seemed to think and have a mind of his own. The segment is also classic because it demonstrated how Disney artists were able to take a simple circumstance and build humor through a character. Clips from the cartoon, including the flypaper scene, were used in the Preston Sturges film Sullivan's Travels (1941), in which the title character (Joel McCrea) has a revelation while viewing Playful Pluto alongside an audience of church-goers and chain-gang prisoners.

== Home media ==
The short was released on December 7, 2004, on Walt Disney Treasures: Mickey Mouse in Black and White, Volume Two: 1929-1935. The short was included in bonus on the Diamond Edition blu-ray of 2009 of Snow White and the Seven Dwarfs.

It was released to Disney+ between September 5 and 8, 2023.

== See also ==
- Mickey Mouse (film series)
