= Donald's Snow Fight =

1942 Donald Duck cartoon

- Theatrical release poster
- Directed by: Jack King
- Story by: Carl Barks; Harry Reeves
- Produced by: Walt Disney
- Starring: Clarence Nash
- Music by: Oliver Wallace
- Animation by: Lee J. Ames; Jim Armstrong; Walt Clinton; Jack Hannah; Hal King; Ed Love; Lee Morehouse; Ray Patin; Retta Scott; Don Towsley; Judge Whitaker
- Layouts by: Bill Herwig
- Production company: Walt Disney Productions
- Distributed by: RKO Radio Pictures
- Release date: April 10, 1942
- Running time: 7 minutes
- Country: United States
- Language: English

Donald's Snow Fight is an animated short film featuring classic cartoon character Donald Duck in a snowball fight with his three nephews Huey, Dewey and Louie. It was released in 1942 by Walt Disney Productions.

== Plot ==
Donald looks outside his house one day and is overjoyed to see snow on the ground. Putting on his overcoat, he goes out to play with a sled on a nearby hill while singing "Jingle Bells". As Donald reaches the top of the hill, he notices his three nephews, Huey, Dewey and Louie, building a snowman at the bottom. Donald slides down the hill on his sled, plowing through his nephews' snowman and laughing at them afterwards, prompting them to plot revenge.

Later, the nephews craft another snowman loosely resembling Donald, label it "Uncle Donald", and provoke their uncle into going after it. Donald furiously attempts to crash through the new snowman, unaware that his nephews had booby-trapped it by building it over a large boulder. Donald collides with the hidden boulder, destroying his sled and knocking all the fur off of his overcoat. In response, Donald declares a snow war on his nephews.

Donald launches the first strike, pelting his nephews with snowballs and turning them into bowling pins, before literally bowling them over with a larger snowball. He then crafts an ice missile by freezing a bullet-shaped clump of snow in water, and launches it towards his nephews' flagpole, splitting it into three pieces which trap his nephews on the ground and repeatedly spank them.

Huey, Dewey, and Louie refuse to surrender, and unleash a counter-attack, launching a volley of mouse trap-filled snow bombs at Donald. After getting pelted and covered in mouse traps, Donald throws a temper tantrum, and gets knocked backwards by a large snowball to his face. Donald's nephews then deliver the finishing blow by firing flaming arrows at their uncle's snow battleship, melting it and sending Donald into the frozen lake below, where he is subsequently frozen in place above the ensuing splash. The triplets celebrate their victory with a stereotypical Native American dance around Donald (this last shot was often cut when it aired on television).

== Voice cast ==
- Clarence Nash: Donald Duck, Huey, Dewey and Louie

== Home media ==
The short was released on December 6, 2005 on Walt Disney Treasures: The Chronological Donald, Volume Two: 1942-1946.
