= George Nicholas (animator) =

American animator

George Nicholas (December 14, 1910-November 23, 1996) was an American animator, known for his work at Disney and Hanna-Barbera.

== Biography ==
Nicholas was born on December 14, 1910, in Vermilion, Ohio, and moved to Los Angeles with his parents when he was 10.

His earliest job as a professional animator was working for Walter Lantz in 1932. In 2016, the founder of the Society for Animation Studies Harvey Deneroff stated that Nicholas's early work for Disney was on Goofy and Pluto short films. Among his later Disney credits were Lady and the Tramp, Cinderella, and One Hundred and One Dalmatians.

For Hanna-Barbera, he worked on The Flintstones TV series and the feature film The Man Called Flintstone, as well as The Jetsons TV series.

He worked with Chuck Jones on cartoon adaptations of stories from The Jungle Book by Rudyard Kipling, including Rikki Tikki Tavi and The White Seal. He also worked on A Christmas Carol for director and fellow animator Richard Williams, which won the Academy Award for Best Animated Short Film in 1972. He also worked on an animated TV special based on Johnny Hart's comic strip B.C., called B.C.: The First Thanksgiving and another TV special based on Hart's The Wizard of Id.

He died in Edinboro, Pennsylvania, on November 23, 1996, at the age of 85.

When Nicholas died, he left an extensive collection of his own animation work, as well as that of other prominent animators such as Ward Kimball, John Lounsbery and Milt Kahl, which he bequeathed to Edinboro University. Working with the Erie Art Museum, his daughter Donna Nicholas organized a traveling exhibition of the best these works, called From Mickey to the Grinch: Art of the Animated Film. Those works were then auctioned off to fund a memorial scholarship in his memory.
