= Cy Young (animator) =

American animator

- 楊左匋/杨左匋
- Born: Yang Sih-yeh (楊錫冶); March 7, 1897; Suzhou, Jiangsu, Qing China
- Died: January 16, 1964 (aged 66); Los Angeles, California, United States
- Burial place: Chapel of the Pines Crematory
- Other names: S. Y. Young; Sy Young
- Occupation: Animator
- Years active: 1920–1946
- Known for: Work on Disney films
- Spouses: Dorolees (m. 1934; div. 1935) Roberta "Betty" Cole (m. 1935)

Cyrus "Cy" Young (simplified Chinese: 杨左匋; traditional Chinese: 楊左匋; March 7, 1897 – January 16, 1964) was a Chinese-American special effects animator, best known for his work for The Walt Disney Company.

Young was brother of Chinese politician Yang Qianli (father of Hong Kong director Evan Yang), architect Yang Xiliu (S. J. Young), Entrepreneur Yang Xiren and Yang Renlan (mother of sociologist Fei Xiaotong). He had works in China called Pause and New Year. Young's first work in United States was as lead animator on the 1931 short "Mendelssohn's Spring Song", a project completed while he was a student in New York City. Disney was so impressed with his work that he hired him to be head of the new special effects animation department and he partnered with animator Ugo D'Orsi.

Frank Thomas and Ollie Johnston wrote in their book Disney Animation: The Illusion of Life; "Through the entire thirties, the entire Effects Department consisted of only two men: Ugo D'Orsi, a straightforward, stubborn, and dedicated Italian, and Cy Young...quiet and sensitive...who loved to play the bass fiddle as a hobby. ... Since [D'Orsi and Young] did most of the careful work themselves, they needed only a single assistant between them." The department's first major project was Snow White and the Seven Dwarfs. Young also worked on Fantasia and Dumbo. He was an uncredited animator on Bambi (1942).

Young left the studio after the 1941 Disney animators' strike and worked as a staff artist and clerk at the Air Force, where he worked on various projects. On January 16, 1964, he died from barbiturate poisoning.
