= Cured Duck =

1945 Donald Duck cartoon

- Theatrical release poster
- Directed by: Jack King
- Written by: Roy Williams
- Produced by: Walt Disney
- Starring: Clarence Nash; Gloria Blondell; Frank Graham
- Music by: Oliver Wallace
- Animation by: Bill Justice; Fred Kopietz; Sandy Strother; Don Towsley
- Layouts by: Ernie Nordli
- Backgrounds by: Merle Cox
- Color process: Technicolor
- Production company: Walt Disney Productions
- Distributed by: RKO Radio Pictures
- Release date: October 26, 1945; (USA)
- Running time: 6:40
- Country: United States
- Language: English

Cured Duck is a 1945 American animated cartoon produced by Walt Disney and directed by Jack King. It stars Clarence Nash as the voice of Donald and Gloria Blondell as the voice of Daisy, respectively. The cartoon features Donald going to visit Daisy, but his temper control problems cause him to wreck the house and get kicked out. To cure himself of his temper, he gets a machine that proceeds to deliver physical and angering abuse.

== Plot ==
Donald is visiting Daisy at her house when Daisy, bothered by Donald's cigar smoke, asks him to open a window. Donald struggles to open it, eventually flying into a wild rage and causing extensive damage to the house and didn't realize that the window was locked until Daisy did it herself. She is displeased and refuses to go out with him until he learns to control his temper.

Later, Donald sees a newspaper advertisement for a machine that assists with anger management. He orders the machine in the mail, and it subjects him to various forms of verbal and physical abuse over a ten-minute period to test his self-control. Donald manages to keep his temper under control most of the entire time, and the machine declares him completely cured.

Donald rushes back to Daisy and successfully manages to open her window without losing his temper, which pleases Daisy enough to agree to a date. However, when Donald laughs at the strange-looking hat she wears, Daisy loses her temper and starts attacking him with a broom.

== Voice cast ==
- Clarence Nash as Donald Duck
- Gloria Blondell as Daisy Duck
- Frank Graham as Anger Control Machine

== Notes ==
This is not the first short where Donald tries to find a way to cure his temper; the first one was Self Control (1938), but this one differs from Self Control in that Donald has better luck learning to control his temper (he returns to his old angry self at the end of the former episode). His curing in Cured Duck seems to be more successful; although he still has a temper, his outbursts are less frequent and intense.

== Home media ==
The short was released on December 6, 2005, on Walt Disney Treasures: The Chronological Donald, Volume Two: 1942-1946.
