= Donald's Double Trouble =

1946 Donald Duck cartoon

- Title card
- Directed by: Jack King
- Story by: Carl Barks; Roy Williams
- Produced by: Walt Disney
- Starring: Clarence Nash; Leslie Denison; Gloria Blondell
- Music by: Oliver Wallace
- Animation by: Fred Kopietz; Don Towsley; Tom Massey; Sandy Strother
- Layouts by: Ernie Nordli
- Backgrounds by: Howard Dunn
- Color process: Technicolor
- Production company: Walt Disney Productions
- Distributed by: RKO Radio Pictures
- Release date: June 28, 1946; (USA)
- Running time: 6:30
- Country: United States
- Language: English

Donald's Double Trouble is a 1946 Donald Duck short film released by RKO Radio Pictures, colored by Technicolor and produced by Walt Disney Productions. This cartoon marks the fourth appearance of Daisy Duck.

This cartoon also features the first appearance of Donald's doppelganger, who was unnamed in this short. It was also his only theatrical appearance. Years later, he reappeared in Legend of the Three Caballeros, where he has been named and since known as "Dapper Duck".

This short is notable for featuring a short-tempered Daisy Duck. At the end of the short, Daisy displays a dangerous temper, which is hypocritical considering that she criticized Donald for his short temper beforehand.

== Plot ==
Donald is inside a telephone booth making a telephone call to Daisy, who scolds him for a lack of manners along with poor English and threatens to end their relationship if Donald doesn't improve his personality. She slams the phone down so hard it causes the telephone booth to explode.

Fearing that he will lose Daisy, Donald wanders through the streets to figure out a solution when he meets a nameless look-alike British-accented duck with a more pleasant voice and temper than him, to whom he offers money to impersonate him in order to win back Daisy.

The plan goes awry when "Dapper Duck" starts falling for Daisy, who is calling him Donald since he looks a lot like him, which incurs Donald's wrath and jealousy, despite Dapper assuring Donald everything is working in the latter's favor. For the rest of the date, Donald tries everything to prevent them from getting closer and win back Daisy himself.

Donald follows them to an amusement park, where he tries several attempts to stop Daisy from falling for Dapper, but fails at every turn. The final attempt is at the Tunnel of Love, where he begs Dapper to stop, but Dapper, fed up with Donald’s disruptions and no longer willing to cooperate with him, shuts him up by pushing him underwater. Donald, now soaked and infuriated, and hearing a kiss from right outside the entrance, takes this as the last straw and storms into the tunnel to stop Dapper as a brief but massive and brutal fight ensues from inside the tunnel.

The camera then zooms to the exit of the tunnel, where it shows Donald and Dapper holding hands and closing eyes romantically, exiting the tunnel, mistaking each other for Daisy. Both become shocked upon seeing each other and then look back to see Daisy walking out of the tunnel, completely drenched and furiously ranting at them incoherently. Realizing he got the wrong duck, Donald, alongside Dapper (who also sees that Daisy is mad at him too), quickly runs away and head for the park's exit to escape Daisy's wrath as she continues to yell at them, even after they are long gone.

== Voice cast ==
- Clarence Nash as Donald Duck
- Gloria Blondell as Daisy Duck
- Leslie Denison as Dapper Duck

== Home media ==
The short was released on December 6, 2005 on Walt Disney Treasures: The Chronological Donald, Volume Two: 1942-1946.

Additional releases include:

- Best Pals: Donald and Daisy (DVD)
- The Parent Trap (DVD, 2001)
