= Sleepy Time Donald =

1947 Donald Duck cartoon

- Theatrical release poster
- Directed by: Jack King
- Story by: Jack Hannah
- Produced by: Walt Disney
- Starring: Clarence Nash; Gloria Blondell
- Music by: Oliver Wallace
- Animation by: Paul Allen; John Reed; Ed Love; Don Towsley; Fred Kopietz
- Layouts by: Ernie Nordli
- Backgrounds by: Ernie Nordli
- Color process: Technicolor
- Production company: Walt Disney Productions
- Distributed by: RKO Radio Pictures
- Release date: May 9, 1947; (US)
- Running time: 6:30
- Country: United States
- Language: English

Sleepy Time Donald is a Donald Duck animated short film which was released on May 9, 1947, and produced in Technicolor by RKO Radio Pictures. It was the sixth cartoon in Donald's filmography to feature Daisy Duck.

== Plot ==
The short revolves around Daisy's efforts to rescue Donald as he keeps running into danger while sleepwalking.

== Voice cast ==
- Clarence Nash as Donald Duck
- Gloria Blondell as Daisy Duck

== Home media ==
The short was released on December 11, 2007, on Walt Disney Treasures: The Chronological Donald, Volume Three: 1947-1950.
