= Donald's Crime =

1945 Donald Duck animated short

- Theatrical release poster
- Directed by: Jack King
- Story by: Ralph Wright
- Produced by: Walt Disney
- Starring: Clarence Nash; Ruth Clifford; Harry E. Lang
- Music by: Edward H. Plumb
- Animation by: Paul Allen; Joshua Meador; Harvey Toombs; Don Towsley
- Layouts by: Ernie Nordli
- Backgrounds by: Merle Cox
- Color process: Technicolor
- Production company: Walt Disney Productions
- Distributed by: RKO Radio Pictures
- Release date: June 29, 1945
- Running time: 8 minutes
- Country: United States
- Language: English

Donald's Crime is a 1945 American animated short film produced by Walt Disney Productions and released by RKO Radio Pictures. The cartoon, which parodies film noir crime dramas of the time, follows Donald Duck as he struggles with guilt after stealing $1.25 (equivalent to $23.26 as of 2026) from his three nephews. The film was directed by Jack King and features original music by Edward H. Plumb. The voice cast includes Clarence Nash as Donald, Huey, Dewey, and Louie, Ruth Clifford as Daisy Duck, and Harry E. Lang as the off-stage voice of Donald's conscience. This was Blondell's first performance as Daisy and marks the debut of the character's "normal" voice. Previously in Mr. Duck Steps Out, Daisy had been voiced by Nash using a voice similar to Donald's.

Donald's Crime was nominated for an Academy Award for Best Animated Short Film at the 18th Academy Awards in 1946, but lost to Quiet Please!, a Tom and Jerry short produced by MGM. It was the fourth such nomination for the Donald Duck film series.

== Plot ==
While preparing for a date with Daisy, Donald discovers he is short on cash. Spotting Huey, Dewey, and Louie's piggy bank, he wrestles with his conscience before deciding to take the money inside. After sending his nephews to bed, Donald breaks the piggy bank open and uses the money to treat Daisy to a wonderful evening at a local nightclub.

After Donald drops Daisy off at her house, his conscience returns, telling him that bank robbery is a federal crime. Donald imagines himself being pursued by federal agents and races across town, ending up in a dark alley that he thinks is a prison cell. A "help wanted" sign falls and hits him on the head, revealing he is actually outside an all-night café. Donald works through the night and earns enough money to repay his nephews, but accidentally overpays by a nickel. When the nephews wake up, they catch Donald trying to retrieve the extra nickel and begin to complain. That causes him to learn a valuable lesson: “crime doesn’t pay.”

== Voice cast ==
- Donald Duck and nephews: Clarence Nash
- Daisy Duck: Ruth Clifford
- Donald's Conscience: Harry E. Lang

Daisy kissing Donald

== Home media ==
The short was released on December 6, 2005 on Walt Disney Treasures: The Chronological Donald, Volume Two: 1942-1946.

Additional releases include:

- 1984 - "Cartoon Classics: More of Disney's Best: 1932-1946" (VHS)
- 2002 - bonus on DVD of The Great Mouse Detective (DVD)
- 2006 - Classic Cartoon Favorites: Best Pals: Donald and Daisy (DVD)
- 2010 - iTunes download
