= Donald's Dream Voice =

1948 Donald Duck cartoon

- Theatrical release poster
- Directed by: Jack King
- Story by: Roy Williams
- Produced by: Walt Disney
- Starring: Clarence Nash; Leslie Denison; Ruth Clifford; Bea Benaderet
- Music by: Oliver Wallace
- Animation by: Edwin Aardal; Paul Allen; Emery Hawkins; Frank McSavage; Don Towsley (uncredited)
- Layouts by: Don Griffith
- Backgrounds by: Merle Cox
- Color process: Technicolor
- Production company: Walt Disney Productions
- Distributed by: RKO Radio Pictures
- Release date: May 21, 1948
- Running time: 6:39
- Country: United States
- Language: English

Donald's Dream Voice is a 1948 American animated short film featuring Donald Duck, the film was directed by Jack Hannah and produced by Walt Disney. In the short film, no one understands a word that salesman Donald says, so he takes voice pills to improve his speech.

== Plot ==
Donald the salesman has a problem where he fails to sell brushes throughout the neighbourhood, because no one can understand what he says. At Daisy Duck's house, Daisy reassures Donald and tells him she believes in him.

Finally, he finds a solution to clear his voice: taking a voice pill, leading to a massive increase in his brush sales.

The pill increases Donald's confidence too and makes him eager to ask Daisy to marry him. After he sells all the brushes, he loses the pills along the way, leaving him only one. Then he goes back to Daisy's house, just as his new voice reverts to his old voice. When he tries to take the pill, it falls to the ground and bounces away from him and he starts following it.

Donald chases the pill through the streets and onto the hat of a particularly large and irritable sewer worker, and then it finally ends up in the mouth of a cow, which causes her to talk in a clear and polite male voice, with Donald taunting her for his last pill. The cow, however, can't understand Donald's voice, causing Donald to lose his temper.

== Voice cast ==
- Clarence Nash as Donald Duck, Angry Burly Guy, Cow (mooing)
- Leslie Denison as Donald Duck's intelligible voice and Talking Cow
- Ruth Clifford as Daisy Duck
- Bea Benaderet as Unseen Lady Customer

== Television ==
- Disneyland, episode #1.4: "The Donald Duck Story"
- Walt Disney's Wonderful World of Color, episode #8.6: "Inside Donald Duck"
- Good Morning, Mickey, episode #32
- Donald Duck Presents, episode #8
- Mickey's Mouse Tracks, episode #49
- Donald's Quack Attack, episode #91
- The Ink and Paint Club, episode #1.40: "Crazy Over Daisy"

== Home media ==
The short was released on December 11, 2007, on Walt Disney Treasures: The Chronological Donald, Volume Three: 1947-1950.

Additional releases include:

- Walt Disney Cartoon Classics: Limited Gold Editions - Daisy (VHS)
- Walt Disney's Classic Cartoon Favorites: Best Pals - Donald and Daisy (DVD)
