= Dumb Bell of the Yukon =

1946 Donald Duck cartoon

- Theatrical release poster
- Directed by: Jack King
- Story by: Harry Reeves; Homer Brightman
- Produced by: Walt Disney
- Starring: Clarence Nash
- Music by: Oliver Wallace
- Animation by: Don Towsley; Ed Aardal; Fred Kopietz; Sandy Strother
- Layouts by: Ernie Nordli
- Backgrounds by: Ernie Nordli
- Color process: Technicolor
- Production company: Walt Disney Productions
- Distributed by: RKO Radio Pictures
- Release date: August 30, 1946
- Running time: 6:34
- Country: United States
- Language: English

Dumb Bell of the Yukon is a 1946 Disney animated short starring Donald Duck and Daisy Duck. It was directed by Jack King.

== Plot ==
Donald is reading a letter from Daisy, telling him to make her some fur coats. Donald goes off to hunt bears. Donald wanders into a bear cave and sees a momma bear and a baby bear. He pictures the baby bear being a fur coat. He uses "essence of honey" to capture the baby bear. The momma bear mistakes Donald for the baby bear and starts licking and hugging him. Donald takes the baby bear home and puts it in a lot of stances. Donald then thinks of the ways he could kill the bear. Donald tries to hang the bear with no success. The momma bear realizes that her baby is not there and follows Donald's footprints to his house. Donald disguises himself as the baby bear. The momma bear accidentally squeezes Donald too tightly and his costume rips off. He puts it back on and tricks the bear, while the baby bear is trying to ruin Donald's plans. The baby bear kicks Donald so hard that his costume comes off and he spills honey on himself. Since Donald spills honey on himself the momma bear and the cub start licking his head.

== Voice cast ==
- Donald Duck: Clarence Nash
- Mother Bear: Candy Candido

== Home media ==
The short was released on December 6, 2005, on Walt Disney Treasures: The Chronological Donald, Volume Two: 1942-1946.
