= Contrary Condor =

1944 Donald Duck cartoon

- Theatrical release poster
- Directed by: Jack King
- Produced by: Walt Disney
- Starring: Clarence Nash
- Music by: Oliver Wallace
- Animation by: Paul Allen; Jack King; Bill Justice; Don Towsley; Bob Carlson; Judge Whitaker; Marvin Woodward; John Reed
- Layouts by: Ernie Nordli
- Backgrounds by: Merle Cox
- Color process: Technicolor
- Production company: Walt Disney Productions
- Distributed by: RKO Radio Pictures
- Release date: April 21, 1944
- Running time: 8 minutes
- Country: United States
- Language: English

Contrary Condor is a 1944 Donald Duck short film by Walt Disney Productions and RKO Radio Pictures.

== Plot ==
The short opens on a map, with footprints belonging to Donald trailing across the border of North America to South America, making a trail through the Andes. Donald is seen climbing up a vertical side of the mountain with plungers on his feet, yodeling as he goes. He sees the nest, and quickly reaches the top, ready to take an egg from a condor. One condor hatchling has already hatched and starts squawking at Donald's arrival, but Donald just tells the hatchling to shut up and shoves him back into his egg shell. When he spots Mother Condor flying overhead, Donald hides the other egg and hides in the other hatching's shell, kicking the baby condor out. The mother lands and decides to sit on the egg in which Donald is hiding. The warmth she provides is almost too much for Donald, and he sweats profusely. The egg suddenly starts to crack, and he is nearly crushed by the condor. Thinking quickly, Donald decides to pretend he's a condor. The mother is convinced, and gives Donald a hug, much to the surprise of the other hatchling. Mother Condor then sends her hatchlings off to learn how to fly. The hatchling pushes Donald off the tree branch, but he manages to hold on when his clothes catch a branch nearby, although he is not so lucky when a passing storm cloud starts to shower all over him. Mother Condor tries to teach Donald to fly, but Donald looks down and gets dizzy. He tries to slip away, but is spotted and brought back. Donald manages to convince her that he has a bum wing, and she starts cradling him. The hatchling gets jealous, and starts squawking for attention. Having had enough, he sends Donald flying into the air and he lands on a branch nearby. Trying to get out of his situation once and for all, Donald rigs up a decoy using branches and leaves, and sends it hurtling to the river below. Although Mother Condor tries to save her "hatchling", she believes it to be too late when it falls into the river, and she starts sobbing on the nearby bank. Donald then takes the other condor egg, thinking himself victorious, but the other hatchling steals it from him. Donald takes it back, but falls down into the river, holding the egg protectively. Relieved to see him still alive, Mother Condor gathers Donald and the egg into her arms and coddles them. That night, egg, Donald, hatchling, and Mother Condor are nestled together, while Donald mutters angrily under his breath.

== Cast ==
- Clarence Nash as Donald Duck
- Florence Gill as Mother Condor
- Dorothy Lloyd as Baby Condor
- Frank Graham as Narrator

== Reception ==
Rick DeMott on Animation World Network writes: "Produced in the same year as Disney's second Latin American feature The Three Caballeros, this Andres-set comedy is actually more humorous than any section of Donald's work in the full-length film. While the narrator often drains character development from Caballeros sequences, in Condor, the contrast between the narrator's matter-of-fact information and the reality of Donald's shenanigans works in a humorous way reminiscent of the Goofy 'How To' shorts. While some of the gags are repetitive and the pacing lags at times, the overall short has enough laughs to be successful. In our more PC age, the idea of Donald stealing eggs for fun is less than sympathetic, but the trouble that ensues gives the baby-snatching duck what he has coming to him I suppose."

== Home media ==
The short was released on December 6, 2005, on Walt Disney Treasures: The Chronological Donald, Volume Two: 1942-1946.

It was also featured as a bonus cartoon on the 2008 DVD, The Caballeros Collection.
