= Donald's Dilemma =

1947 Donald Duck cartoon

- Theatrical release poster
- Directed by: Jack King
- Story by: Roy Williams
- Produced by: Walt Disney
- Starring: Clarence Nash; Gloria Blondell
- Music by: Oliver Wallace
- Animation by: Don Towsley; Ed Aardal; Emery Hawkins; Sandy Strother
- Layouts by: Don Griffith
- Backgrounds by: Maurice Greenberg
- Color process: Technicolor
- Production company: Walt Disney Productions
- Distributed by: RKO Radio Pictures
- Release date: July 11, 1947
- Running time: 7 minutes
- Country: United States
- Language: English

Donald's Dilemma is a Walt Disney Studios animated cartoon directed by Jack King and starring Donald and Daisy Duck. It was originally released on July 11, 1947 in the United States. The song "No One But Donald Duck", which would later become Donald Duck's official theme song, made its debut in this cartoon.

== Plot ==
Daisy recounts her story to an unseen psychologist. Her troubles began when she was walking with Donald and a flowerpot fell on his head, causing him to lose his memory but gain a melodious singing voice. He became a well-known singer and his rendition of "When You Wish Upon a Star" became a huge success. Daisy was left heartbroken at the loss of Donald and grappled with insomnia, anorexia, and suicidal thoughts. After an unsuccessful attempt to see Donald in concert at Radio City Music Hall, she sought the psychologist's help.

The psychologist theorizes that another flowerpot falling on Donald's head might restore his memory. He warns Daisy that this might also result in the loss of Donald's newfound singing talent, but Daisy is undeterred. She infiltrates one of Donald's concerts and drops a flowerpot on his head, restoring his memory and his original voice. Donald is booed off the stage but ultimately reunites with Daisy.

== Voice cast ==
- Donald Duck: Clarence Nash
- Daisy Duck: Gloria Blondell
- Psychologist: Richard Conte
- Singer: Walter Pidgeon
- Audience members: Margaret Wright And Melvin J. Gibby

== Reception ==
In The Disney Films, Leonard Maltin says that Donald's Dilemma is "perhaps the best Donald Duck of all... a sidesplitting satire of psychological dramas." Maltin provides a number of reasons why he considers this a great cartoon: "Foremost is the fact that it makes the characters and their situation real, even while reminding you that this is a cartoon. The audience actually becomes involved with Daisy's predicament, and there are marvelous little touches to heighten the emotionalism (as when she is climbing to the catwalk near the end and almost loses her step). At the same time the cartoon is filled with hilarious visual exaggeration: when Daisy recalls that Donald gave her a cold icy stare, a long icicle emits from his eyes, and as she waits for Donald at the stage door of the theatre, the seasons change and she is covered with snow. Donald's Dilemma shows how much could be done within the framework of a seven-minute cartoon, using familiar characters; it is a gem."

According to John Howard Reid in Science-Fiction & Fantasy Cinema: Classic Films of Horror, Sci-Fi & the Supernatural, Daisy displays "a ruthlessly self-centered neurotic streak", but maintains the audience's sympathy throughout the film.

== Home media ==
The short was released on December 11, 2007 on Walt Disney Treasures: The Chronological Donald, Volume Three: 1947-1950.

Additional releases include:

- 1984 - Cartoon Classics - Limited Gold Edition: Daisy (VHS)
- 2005 - Classic Cartoon Favorites: Extreme Music Fun (DVD)
