= Joshua Tree (disambiguation) =

Joshua tree is a common name of Yucca brevifolia, a species of arborescent monocot native to North America.

Joshua Tree may also refer to:

== Place names ==
- Joshua Tree, California, a census-designated place in San Bernardino County, California, United States
  - Roy Williams Airport or Joshua Tree Airport
- Joshua Tree National Park, in California
- Joshua Tree Forest, a landmark on the Mojave Road
- Joshua Tree Forest Parkway, a segment of U.S. Route 93 in Arizona

== Creative works ==
- The Joshua Tree, a 1987 album by U2
  - The Joshua Tree Tour, a 1987 tour by U2
  - The Joshua Tree Tours 2017 and 2019, concert tours by U2
- Joshua Tree (1993 film), a film starring Dolph Lundgren
- Joshua Tree (2002 film), a short film by Jonathan Messer
- "Joshua Tree", a 2002 short story by Emma Bull
- "Joshua Tree", a song from Carly Rae Jepsen's 2022 album The Loneliest Time

== Other ==
- Joshua Tree (horse), an Irish racehorse
