= Donald's Garden =

1942 Donald Duck cartoon

- Theatrical release poster
- Directed by: Dick Lundy
- Story by: Ralph Wright
- Produced by: Walt Disney
- Starring: Clarence Nash
- Music by: Oliver Wallace
- Animation by: Bob Carlson; Walt Clinton; Jack Hannah; Volus Jones; Ted Bonnicksen; Kenneth Muse
- Layouts by: Thor Putnam
- Backgrounds by: Ed Starr
- Production company: Walt Disney Productions
- Distributed by: RKO Radio Pictures, Inc.
- Release date: June 12, 1942
- Running time: 7 minutes
- Country: United States
- Language: English

Donald's Garden is a 1942 animated short film featuring Donald Duck. It was released by Walt Disney Productions.

== Plot ==
Donald has a garden full of prize-winning melons and a hungry gopher comes along causing a battle to ensue between them.

== Voice cast ==
- Clarence Nash as Donald Duck

== Home media ==
The short was released on December 6, 2005 on Walt Disney Treasures: The Chronological Donald, Volume Two: 1942-1946.
