= Donald's Diary =

1954 Donald Duck cartoon

- Theatrical release poster
- Directed by: Jack Kinney
- Story by: Brice Mack; Dick Kinney
- Produced by: Walt Disney
- Starring: Clarence Nash; Vivi Janiss; Leslie Denison
- Music by: Edward H. Plumb
- Animation by: John Sibley; Ken O'Brien; Harry Holt; Edwin "Ed" Aardal
- Layouts by: Bruce Bushman
- Color process: Technicolor
- Production company: Walt Disney Productions
- Distributed by: RKO Radio Pictures
- Release date: March 5, 1954
- Running time: 7 minutes
- Country: United States
- Language: English

Donald's Diary is a Donald Duck short film which was produced in Technicolor and released March 5, 1954 by RKO Radio Pictures. This marks the final appearances of Daisy Duck and Huey, Dewey and Louie in The Golden Age of Animation.

== Plot ==
On February 29, bachelor Donald Duck is walking down the streets of San Francisco. Bachelorette Daisy Duck spots Donald, and after several unsuccessful attempts to be noticed by him, ultimately sets a physical trap that literally "sweeps him off his feet". Donald and Daisy's relationship progresses, ultimately leading Donald to meet her family, and buy her an engagement ring. Donald goes to Daisy's house to pop the question, but while waiting on Daisy to finish her shower, Donald dozes off.

In Donald's dream, his future plays out. Donald marries Daisy, but problems start immediately when Daisy sabotages Donald's honeymoon plans by disconnecting the trailer carrying his boat, and by inviting her brothers along on the trip as well. Donald is further frustrated when Daisy's family is already waiting in the newlyweds' new home. Upon settling in to domestic life, things further deteriorate when Daisy begins neglecting her appearance, taking Donald's money, and ruining his meals. As Daisy piles more and more chores on him, the mounting exhaustion and frustration cause Donald to literally explode.

Waking up from his dream, Donald screams in horror at the sight of Daisy and runs away out of fear of the events of his nightmare coming true. He joins the French Foreign Legion, where he records the whole episode in his diary.

== Voice cast ==
- Clarence Nash as Donald Duck and Huey, Dewey and Louie
- Vivi Janiss as Daisy Duck and Daisy's Mother
- Leslie Denison as Donald's Internal Monologue/Narrator

== Home media ==
The short was released on November 11, 2008, on Walt Disney Treasures: The Chronological Donald, Volume Four: 1951-1961.
