= Wide Open Spaces (1947 film) =

1947 Donald Duck cartoon

- Theatrical release poster
- Directed by: Jack King
- Story by: MacDonald MacPherson; Jack Huber
- Produced by: Walt Disney
- Starring: Clarence Nash; Billy Bletcher
- Music by: Oliver Wallace
- Animation by: Don Towsley; Paul Allen; Emery Hawkins; Sandy Strother
- Layouts by: Don Griffith
- Backgrounds by: Howard Dunn
- Color process: Technicolor
- Production company: Walt Disney Productions
- Distributed by: RKO Radio Pictures
- Release date: September 12, 1947
- Running time: 6:30
- Country: United States
- Language: English

Wide Open Spaces is a 1947 Donald Duck short cartoon, produced by Walt Disney and directed by Jack King for Walt Disney Productions and RKO Radio Pictures.

== Plot ==
The short opens late at night in front of the "Hold-Up Motel" where Donald, exhausted and looking for a place to sleep, pulls his car over to spend the night. The motel owner informs him that all the beds are occupied and the only option he has is sleeping outside on the cot on the porch. Donald accepts, but before he can hop on the cot, the motel owner adds that it costs 16 dollars (equivalent to $231 in 2025), causing Donald to angrily refuse and tie the man's arm into a knot. In response, the motel owner kicks Donald, sending him flying into his car.

Donald drives deeper into the woodland and finds a spot to sleep on an air mattress. After struggling to get the mattress inflated (failing twice with a floor pump before blowing it up himself), Donald gets ready to rest but is bothered by a rock underneath the mattress. He throws the rock away sending it up to a hill, where it causes a chain reaction that sends a huge boulder towards Donald, who is woken up and panics trying to escape in his car. The boulder catches up and crushes him against a tree, causing Donald's vehicle to crunch into the shape of a 1910s Ford Model T.

Donald returns to bed and falls asleep. As he snores, however, the mattress balloons, putting Donald in a vertical position sustained by his opening and closing beak, leads Donald over a cliff and into the river below. Donald continues to slumber underwater next to a large sleeping fish that draws Donald's head near its jaws each time it inhales. Donald realizes where he is only after he and the fish struggle for the blanket and swims back to shore.

The springy branch of a nearby pine tree bothers Donald in his sleep and he is smacked back by it when he tries to shove it away. Angered, Donald fixes a fallen tree branch under the pine's branch to keep it away. However, as Donald sleeps, his exhalations cause the tree branch to lose hold of the pine's branch, causing it to hit the air mattress pump (with the hose still attached to the mattress valve) and wobble up and down with the handle, pumping fast and strong. This causes Donald's mattress to get excessively inflated until it pops off and takes flight, deflating rapidly in mid-air while Donald continues to sleep.

As the mattress deflates, it propels Donald all the way back to the Hold-Up Motel, landing right on the porch cot. The owner comes out, believing that Donald has spent the entire night on the cot, and asks him the 16 dollars, which Donald hands over in his sleep. Immediately after paying, the motel owner notifies Donald that his time is up and shoves Donald off of the porch and into the arms of a cactus. Despite his uncomfortable new sleeping arrangement, Donald continues to slumber as the cartoon ends.

== Voice cast ==
- Clarence Nash as Donald Duck
- Billy Bletcher as the motel proprietor

== Home media ==
The short was released on December 11, 2007, on Walt Disney Treasures: The Chronological Donald, Volume Three: 1947-1950.
