= Don Donald =

1937 Donald Duck cartoon

- Theatrical release poster
- Directed by: Ben Sharpsteen
- Story by: Webb Smith; Otto Englander; Merrill De Maris
- Produced by: Walt Disney
- Starring: Clarence Nash
- Music by: Paul J. Smith
- Animation by: Fred Spencer; Dick Huemer; Al Eugster; Johnny Cannon; Milt Schaffer; Jack Hannah; Ugo D'Orsi
- Color process: Technicolor
- Production company: Walt Disney Productions
- Distributed by: United Artists
- Release date: January 9, 1937
- Running time: 8 minutes
- Country: United States
- Language: English

Don Donald is a 1937 American animated short film produced by Walt Disney Productions and released by United Artists. The cartoon follows Donald Duck attempting to woo a female Mexican duck named Donna. It was directed by Ben Sharpsteen and features music by Paul J. Smith which was adapted from the Mexican folk songs "Cielito Lindo" and "Jarabe Tapatío". Clarence Nash voiced both Donald and Donna.

This is the first cartoon to feature Donald as the primary starring character. The film also introduces a love interest for Donald. It was originally released as part of the Mickey Mouse series before being reissued under the Donald Duck series.

== Plot ==
Donald Duck rides Jenny the donkey through the Mexican desert playing a guitar and wearing a sombrero on his way to the house of his girlfriend, Donna Duck. Donna dances the Mexican hat dance and eventually lands on Donald's donkey who throws her off his back. Donald laughs causing Donna to get angry. She knocks Donald into a fountain, breaks his guitar over his head, and storms back inside the house.

Back outside, Jenny laughs at Donald's misfortunes. Donald decides to exchange Jenny for a car at a nearby trading post.

Donna is immediately won back with Donald's car. She lands in the rumble seat and gives Donald a big kiss. Together they speed off through the desert, but eventually the car has engine problems and stops working. Donald confidently tries to fix the problem but the car suddenly goes out of control; the rumble seat closes on Donna and she is trapped inside as the car throws Donald out and speeds off without him, with Donald in pursuit. The car crashes, throwing Donna out of the rumble seat, across a waterhole, and into a mud puddle, and Donald laughs at her. Donna, furious once again, grabs the car's horn and hits Donald with it, until he lands in some cacti and Donna shoves the horn in his mouth. Donna then rides off on her unicycle which she has conveniently carried with her in her purse, and declares their relationship over.

Donald, alone in the desert with Jenny who has escaped from the trading post, is furious at the car and throws the horn at it in retaliation. This, however, causes the car's radiator to explode and the hot water lands on Donald's sombrero, shrinking it in the process. Jenny laughs at Donald yet again, ending the cartoon.

== Production ==
The film was first conceived in 1935 as a Silly Symphony short called Little Burro, about a young boy who trades his burro for a car to impress his girlfriend. It was reworked as a Donald Duck comedy.

It is unclear if Donna Duck simply represents an earlier version of Daisy Duck or is a separate character entirely. Donna was later retconned in a 1951 Disney comic strip as Daisy's rival. Donna made several other appearances in the British magazine Mickey Mouse Weekly. She did not appear in any other films.

== Releases ==
- January 9, 1937 - original release (theatrical)
- November 13, 1984 - Donald Duck's 50th Birthday (TV)
- 1993 - The Adventures of Mickey and Donald, episode 26 (TV)
- October 13, 1997 - Ink & Paint Club, episode 4: "Disney Firsts" (TV)

== Home media ==
The short was released on May 18, 2004 on Walt Disney Treasures: The Chronological Donald, Volume One: 1934-1941.

Additional releases include:

- 1984 - "Cartoon Classics: Donald Duck's First 50 Years" (VHS)
- 1987 - "Cartoon Classics: Starring Donald and Daisy" (VHS)
- January 11, 2005 - "Classic Cartoon Favorites: Starring Donald" (DVD)
- April 29, 2008 - bonus feature on the "Classic Caballeros Collection" (DVD).

== See also ==
- Mickey Mouse (film series)
