= Timber (1941 film) =

1941 Donald Duck cartoon

- Theatrical release poster
- Directed by: Jack King
- Story by: Carl Barks; Jack Hannah; Frank Tashlin
- Produced by: Walt Disney
- Starring: Clarence Nash; Billy Bletcher
- Music by: Oliver Wallace
- Animation by: Emery Hawkins; Ed Love; Ray Patterson
- Color process: Technicolor
- Production company: Walt Disney Productions
- Distributed by: RKO Radio Pictures
- Release date: January 10, 1941
- Running time: 8 minutes
- Country: United States
- Language: English

Timber is a 1941 animated short film by Walt Disney Productions featuring Donald Duck and Pete.

== Plot ==
Donald Duck is portrayed as a hobo, walking along railroad tracks singing "She'll Be Coming 'Round the Mountain". He smells tasty things and follows the scent to a log cabin that is also the home of the lumberjack Peg-Leg Pete. While Pete is trying to enjoy lunch, Donald steals the food from Pete's table, angering Pete, who then hands Donald a stick of dynamite. Donald thinks the dynamite is food, and it explodes. Pete (in a French Canadian accent) asks Donald whether he wants food. When Donald says yes, Pete throws an axe at Donald, telling him to get to work. The axe is so heavy that it pushes Donald into the trunk of a tree. In an attempt to get out of the job, Donald breaks the axe with a stone and shows it to Pete, but Pete responds by putting the blade on a piece of wood and hitting it, creating a new handle. Donald swings the axe so hard that it breaks the blade off, sailing over Pete and cutting off part of his pants. Deciding that it is too hard to work with an old-fashioned axe, Donald finds a crosscut saw in a tree trunk and begins using it instead.

When the saw gets stuck in the thick bark of the tree and jams, Donald attempts to pull it, but the force pushes Donald backward and throws him into Pete, knocking both to the ground. Donald ends up inside of Pete's shirt along with the saw, which is partially inside Pete's belly. Donald starts pulling the saw out, tickling Pete. Later, Pete rises and angrily chases Donald, threatening to kill him. While Donald is running away, the saw suddenly vibrates back and forth. Donald bounces on the ground with the saw and flies over Pete, with the saw's ends hitting Pete and pushing his head into the ground. As Pete notices him, Donald chops off a tree branch, causing it to fall on Pete, but Pete quickly rises and kicks Donald, causing his head to become stuck between the saw's ends. As Donald tries to free himself, he accidentally chops down a huge tree, which collapses on Pete. Furious, Pete roars like a lion with anger and begins chasing Donald.

The chase leads Donald and Pete onto a railroad track, where they begin a chase on handcars. After chasing Donald through a tunnel, Pete tries to grab Donald by the tail but fails every time, forcing him to pump his flatcar fast enough to bump Donald's rear end. As Donald escapes, Pete resorts to using a peavey to stab him, but he only removes pieces from Donald's flatcar until it is nothing but wheels. Pete then sharpens the tip of the peavey and increases its temperature by laying it on his flatcar's wheel so that it burns Donald, but the heat only causes Donald to go faster. Donald jumps off and pulls a lever at a station, triggering a coal-storage door. The coal lands on Pete and dismantles his flatcar, leaving him cycling on one wheel. Now fleeing on foot, Donald outruns Pete and, in the nick of time, pulls a lever that turns the track the other way, causing Pete to veer off course and crash through a row of boxcars. Satisfied, Donald says farewell to Pete through the boxcar hole and walks off happily into the sunset singing "She'll Be Coming 'Round the Mountain".

== Voice cast ==
- Donald Duck as Clarence Nash
- Pete as Billy Bletcher

== Home media ==
The short was released on May 18, 2004 as part of the Walt Disney Treasures: The Chronological Donald, Volume One: 1934-1941 DVD set.
