= Daddy Duck =

1948 Donald Duck cartoon

- Theatrical release poster
- Directed by: Jack Hannah
- Story by: Jack Cosgriff; Bob McCormick
- Produced by: Walt Disney
- Starring: Clarence Nash; Bea Benaderet
- Music by: Oliver Wallace
- Animation by: Jack Boyd; Bob Carlson; Phil Duncan; Tom Massey
- Layouts by: Ernie Nordil
- Backgrounds by: Thelma Witmer
- Production company: Walt Disney Productions
- Distributed by: RKO Radio Pictures, Inc.
- Release date: April 16, 1948
- Running time: 6:20
- Country: United States
- Language: English

Daddy Duck is a 1948 animated short film featuring Donald Duck. It was released by Walt Disney Productions.

== Plot ==
Donald Duck adopts a baby kangaroo and tries to give him a bath. The lady at the adoption bureau is on the telephone with him giving him instructions. After they get through that, the kangaroo gets scared by a rug made of a bear skin.

== Voice cast ==
- Clarence Nash as Donald Duck
- Bea Benaderet as Adoption Bureau

== Home media ==
The short was released on December 11, 2007 on Walt Disney Treasures: The Chronological Donald, Volume Three: 1947-1950.
