= No Hunting =

1955 Donald Duck cartoon

- Theatrical release poster
- Directed by: Jack Hannah
- Story by: Bill Berg; Dick Shaw
- Produced by: Walt Disney
- Starring: Jack Hannah; Clarence Nash; Bill Thompson
- Music by: Oliver Wallace
- Animation by: John Sibley; Dan MacManus (effects)
- Layouts by: Yale Gracey
- Backgrounds by: Ray Huffine
- Color process: Technicolor
- Production company: Walt Disney Productions
- Distributed by: RKO Radio Pictures
- Release date: January 14, 1955 (U.S.)
- Running time: 6:10
- Country: United States
- Language: English

No Hunting is a 1955 American animated short film produced by Walt Disney Productions and released by RKO Radio Pictures. The cartoon features Donald Duck participating in an overly-dramatic hunting trip after being inspired by his pioneer ancestor. The film was directed by Jack Hannah and features original music by Oliver Wallace. It was produced in widescreen CinemaScope.

No Hunting was nominated for an Academy Award for Best Animated Short Film at the 28th Academy Awards, held in 1955, but lost to the Merrie Melodies film Speedy Gonzales. It was the ninth and final such nomination received by the Donald Duck film series.

== Plot ==
Donald Duck is enjoying a luxurious meal under a large portrait of his pioneering grandfather. The narrator notes that Donald's life is significantly easier than his ancestor who had to hunt in order to survive. Donald then sees that hunting season begins the next day and, possessed by the spirit of his grandfather, decides to participate.

When Donald arrives at the hunting grounds that evening, he finds it extremely overcrowded. Local residents go into hiding as vendors set up shop; the deer in the forest, represented by a cameo of Bambi and his mother, leave the area after seeing loads of litter wash downstream.

The precise opening of hunting season that night unfolds in dramatic fashion. The scenes evoke stereotypical war films, depicting trench and tank warfare, amphibious landing craft, and hunters parachuting into the forest. At the end of the day, the discouraged hunters trudge home across a war-torn landscape. Yet the narrator notes that the day was "not without game", as Donald's grandfather presents a cow, taken from a local farm, which had the word "cow" painted on it so the hunters would not confuse it for a deer.

== Voice cast ==
- Narrator: Robert C. Bruce
- Donald Duck: Clarence Nash
- Donald's ancestor/Radio operator/Ranger Jenkins: Bill Thompson
- Moose: Jack Hannah

Director Jack Hannah recorded several voice overs for the cartoon according to one interview. These included a moose who says "Hmm, you're a cute one." According to Hannah, animator John Sibley who worked on the scene enjoyed the way Hannah spoke the line, and Hannah decided to record it himself. It is not known specifically which other voices Hannah recorded, yet several minor roles are uncredited.

== Background ==
The film's satirical presentation of recreational hunting was inspired by director Jack Hannah's own experiences as a child. He once said: "I used to go hunting with my dad when I was a kid and this short was a great takeoff on these hunters and fishermen. They really are this way. They are as dangerous to themselves as to the game they're hunting. I've heard there are more hunters shot on opening day than deer."

== Home media ==
The short was remastered and also released on November 11, 2008, on Walt Disney Treasures: The Chronological Donald, Volume Four: 1951-1961.
