= Window Cleaners =

1940 Donald Duck cartoon

- Theatrical release poster
- Directed by: Jack King
- Story by: Carl Barks; Jack Hannah
- Produced by: Walt Disney
- Starring: Clarence Nash
- Music by: Paul J. Smith; Oliver Wallace
- Animation by: Judge Whitaker
- Color process: Technicolor
- Production company: Walt Disney Productions
- Distributed by: RKO Radio Pictures
- Release date: September 20, 1940
- Running time: 8 minutes
- Country: United States
- Language: English

Window Cleaners is an animated short film produced in Technicolor by Walt Disney Productions and released to theaters on September 20, 1940 by RKO Radio Pictures.

== Plot ==
Donald Duck is on a roped platform with Pluto pulling him up. Donald's hat and tail feathers get trimmed by a building occupant using garden shears, exposing his bare tail. Pluto easily gets distracted by a flea and lets go of the rope, causing Donald to fall. The rope gets entangled with a stop sign and stops the platform, causing Donald to land on a statue of horse in a pose resembling Napoleon. Later on, Donald throws a bucket of water to wash the window but quickly runs out of water. Donald orders Pluto to wake up and attach a new bucket of water, but he refuses. Donald gets angry at Pluto, yelling at him and finally throwing a brush down the drainpipe. Pluto wakes up and blows the pulley to the wrong bucket full of nuts and bolts. Donald hoists up the bucket and throws the contents at the window, smashing it to pieces. He pulls down the window shade in embarrassment.

Donald is still working when Spike the Bee flies over to the tulip and Donald plays a practical joke on the bee by almost drowning him in water. This proves to be a mistake as Spike gets revenge and attacks Donald who defends himself with a bucket. Donald tries to attack Spike on the building flagpole, but he loses his balance and falls onto the roped platform. Spike then dives down at Donald who swings at the bee with his mop and misses. Donald spins, gets tangled in the rope, and is tied up. Spike sees this as an opportunity to sting Donald's exposed rear end. Donald warns the bee not to touch him, but Spike ignores Donald and dives for him. Donald blows at Spike really hard until both Donald and Spike are winded. Spike lands on the platform. He slowly gets up and aims his stinger into Donald's rear end which causes Donald to yell and become untangled from the roped platform. Donald dives headfirst into the drainpipe until his head comes out at the bottom. Donald yells at Pluto for help, but Pluto ignores him and shoves Donald's head back into the drainpipe where Donald continues to scream. Pluto then goes back to sleep.

== Voice cast ==
- Donald Duck: Clarence Nash
- Pluto: Lee Millar

== Production ==
Window Cleaners is the first cartoon to feature Spike the Bee as Donald's main rival. It is also the first Donald Duck cartoon with an opening theme that was used in more than one cartoon.

== Reception ==
The Film Daily called the short a "hilarious cartoon", saying: "Donald Duck, window cleaner, and his assistant, Pluto, will draw plenty of laughs from audiences in this cartoon."

In The Disney Films, Leonard Maltin quotes film historian William K. Everson, who said: "Disney used height -- skyscrapers, mountains, etc. -- far more than other cartoon-makers, and with more concern for perspective and the convincing illusion of dizzy depths. Height gags in Warner Brothers cartoons and MGM cartoons were always just that -- rapid gags that paid off quickly in a laugh, and without a buildup. Disney, on the other hand, used height much as Harold Lloyd did, to counterpoint comedy with a genuine thrill."

== Home media ==
The short was released on May 18, 2004 on Walt Disney Treasures: The Chronological Donald, Volume One: 1934-1941.

Additional releases include:

- Walt Disney Cartoon Classics: Limited Gold Edition II: Donald's Bee Pictures
- Walt Disney's Funny Factory with Donald Volume 2
