= The Riveter =

1940 Donald Duck cartoon

- Theatrical release poster
- Directed by: Dick Lundy
- Produced by: Walt Disney
- Starring: Clarence Nash; Billy Bletcher
- Music by: Oliver Wallace
- Animation by: Jack Campbell; Al Eugster; Hal King; Ed Love
- Color process: Technicolor
- Production company: Walt Disney Productions
- Distributed by: RKO Radio Pictures
- Release date: March 15, 1940
- Running time: 7:33
- Country: United States
- Language: English

The Riveter is a 1940 American Donald Duck short film directed by Dick Lundy and produced by Walt Disney. In the short film, Donald lands a job working high steel as a riveter for construction foreman Pete.

== Plot ==
After a rough off-screen physical confrontation, a construction worker is aggressively thrown off a jobsite. The foreman, Pete, posts a sign reading "Riveter Wanted". Donald sees the sign and indicates his interest in the job to Pete, who is skeptical due to Donald's comparatively small stature. Donald however insists he can perform the job, so Pete hires him and immediately sends him to work on the top floor. Donald gets off to a rough start due to being disoriented and terrified by the height, and then by not knowing how to work the rivet gun. Unable to physically control the rivet gun, Donald is dragged by it along the jobsite.

Pete decides to take his lunch break and orders Donald to serve him, but the loud noise from the other rivet guns distracts Donald to the point of completely ruining Pete's lunch. An enraged Pete chases Donald throughout the high floors of the jobsite. Donald outmaneuvers Pete, causing Pete to fall off the side of the building and into a tub of quick drying plaster. The plaster encases Pete into a fountain statue, causing Donald to laugh uproariously.

== Voice cast ==
- Clarence Nash as Donald Duck
- Billy Bletcher as Pete

== Music ==
Donald enters the cartoon singing "Heigh Ho" from Snow White and the Seven Dwarfs.

== Releases ==
=== Television ===
- Good Morning, Mickey, episode #57
- Goofy's Guide to Success
- Mickey's Mouse Tracks, episode #63
- The Ink and Paint Club, episode #1.11: "The Many Lives of Pegleg Pete"

== Home media ==
The short was released on May 18, 2004, on Walt Disney Treasures: The Chronological Donald, Volume One: 1934-1941.

It can also be found on VHS on Walt Disney Cartoon Classics: Limited Gold Editions - Donald with the original opening and closing titles.
