= The Plastics Inventor =

1944 Donald Duck cartoon

- Theatrical release poster
- Directed by: Jack King
- Story by: Jack Hannah; Dick Shaw; Carl Barks (uncredited)
- Produced by: Walt Disney
- Starring: Clarence Nash
- Music by: Oliver Wallace
- Animation by: Don Towsley; Paul Allen; Bill Justice; Brad Case
- Layouts by: Ernie Nordli
- Backgrounds by: Merle Cox
- Color process: Technicolor
- Production company: Walt Disney Productions
- Distributed by: RKO Radio Pictures
- Release date: September 1, 1944
- Running time: 7 minutes
- Country: United States
- Language: English

The Plastics Inventor is a Disney animated short from 1944, produced in Technicolor by RKO Radio Pictures, featuring Donald Duck.

== Plot ==
Donald Duck makes an airplane made of plastic, following instructions from a radio. The cartoon begins with Donald listening to the radio, and having a massive pile of junk - just enough to build his plastic airplane. After Donald completes his plastic invention, the radio reminds Donald to make his helmet.

Then Donald decides to test pilot his plastic airplane in the sky, bringing the radio along with him. During the flight, the radio explains one fault; to not let the plastic airplane melt in water. Unfortunately, a rainstorm starts pouring and the plastic airplane begins to melt, with Donald attempting to repair it with extreme difficulty.

The airplane eventually melts away completely, forming into a parachute as Donald lands safely on a tulip patch. Donald, now angry at the radio, waters the radio with a watering can, melting it to liquid, ending the cartoon.

== Voice cast ==
- Clarence Nash as Donald Duck

== Home media ==
The short was released on December 6, 2005, on Walt Disney Treasures: The Chronological Donald, Volume Two: 1942-1946.
