= Drip Dippy Donald =

1948 Donald Duck cartoon

- Theatrical release poster
- Directed by: Jack King
- Story by: Nick George
- Produced by: Walt Disney
- Starring: Clarence Nash; John Dehner
- Music by: Oliver Wallace
- Animation by: Don Towsley; Ed Aardal; Paul Allen; Sandy Strother
- Layouts by: Don Griffith
- Backgrounds by: Howard Dunn
- Color process: Technicolor
- Production company: Walt Disney Productions
- Distributed by: RKO Radio Pictures
- Release date: March 5, 1948
- Running time: 6:40
- Country: United States
- Language: English

Drip Dippy Donald is a seven-minute Donald Duck cartoon made by the Walt Disney Company in 1948. The Technicolor cartoon was released by Walt Disney Productions, and distributed by RKO Radio Pictures. The cartoon was directed by the Disney animator Jack King.

== Plot ==
A deeply sleeping Donald is kicked off the city bus he was riding in when it arrives at his house. Exhausted, he quickly hurries inside and heads straight to bed. The first sign of trouble is caused by a flashing neon sign outside shining through his uncovered window. Donald begins a battle with his belligerent window blind, before he finally nails it to the wall. Feeling content, Donald heads back to bed and instantly falls asleep.

It is a short respite. The kitchen faucet begins dripping and seemingly with a mind of its own, it even makes melodies as it drips. Frustrated, Donald leaps out of bed and turns it off tightly before heading back to bed all bleary eyed, but is soon disrupted once again. The dripping faucet plays more melodies with a pile of dishes in the sink and then becomes magnified in Donald's delirious mind, first appearing as giant, booming drops of water falling from a great height into a much deeper sink. The drops turn into falling bombs with an even deeper louder sound, shaking Donald violently as he rolls up inside his mattress to try to escape the sound. His whole house then begins shaking off its foundations with each drop. Soon the whole earth is affected and shakes with each drop as the incessant drops are increasingly magnified in Donald's sleep-deprived mind.

A frazzled Donald tries every option — ranging from falling asleep with his tongue out under the faucet to a cork to a garden hose — but is continually thwarted by the inexorable drip.

The cartoon concludes with Donald sitting with a sponge collecting the drips at the end of a long bizarre Rube Goldberg machine he has created. The telephone rings, and it is the Water Board informing Donald that his water has been cut off — effective immediately — for not paying his water bill. As a result, the drip finally stops, and Donald, unhinged by the ordeal, begins laughing insanely as he feels relieved that he doesn't have to deal with the drip anymore.

== Voice cast ==
- Donald Duck: Clarence Nash
- Bus Driver and Man on Telephone: John Dehner

== Home media ==
The short was released on December 11, 2007, on Walt Disney Treasures: The Chronological Donald, Volume Three: 1947-1950.
