= Crazy Over Daisy =

1950 Donald Duck cartoon

- Theatrical release poster
- Directed by: Jack Hannah
- Story by: Jack Hannah
- Produced by: Walt Disney
- Starring: Clarence Nash; Gloria Blondell; Helen Silbert; Dessie Miller
- Music by: Oliver Wallace
- Animation by: Bill Justice; Volus Jones; Bob Carlson
- Layouts by: Yale Gracey
- Backgrounds by: Thelma Witmer
- Color process: Technicolor
- Production company: Walt Disney Productions
- Distributed by: RKO Radio Pictures
- Release date: March 18, 1950; (USA)
- Running time: 6:20
- Country: United States
- Language: English

Crazy Over Daisy is a Donald Duck animated short film which was originally released on March 18, 1950. Produced in Technicolor by Walt Disney Productions and RKO Radio Pictures, the short featured Donald Duck, Daisy Duck, and Chip 'n' Dale. Mickey Mouse, Minnie Mouse, and Goofy also made a brief cameo at the beginning of the film. The story takes place in the 1890s. Donald is on his way to visit Daisy, when Chip n' Dale come along and spoil the date.

== Plot ==
In the 1890s, Donald Duck is riding his penny-farthing bicycle, humming a love tune (the theme song "Daisy Mae") and on his way to Daisy Duck. He passes and waves to townspeople, including Mickey Mouse with Minnie Mouse driving an old vehicle and Goofy as Iceman. Chip 'n' Dale find Donald's look and mannerisms amusing, and proceed to mock and antagonize him. Donald initially shoos them up into a nearby tree, but they continue their mockery of him along a tree branch. The feud escalates until Chip 'n' Dale ultimately destroy Donald's bicycle with a cannon ball.

Drenched from landing in a fountain and enraged at his destroyed bicycle, Donald chases and ultimately catches the chipmunks. He drags them into his workshop, where he hastily assembles a new bicycle. This new model includes wheels wide enough to serve as treadmills, in which he traps the chipmunks to power the bike. He rides his new chipmunk powered bike to Daisy's house.

Donald stands on Daisy's sidewalk expecting her to kiss him in greeting, but is instead met with a slap across his face. Daisy, sympathetic towards the chipmunks who had been pressed into slave labor, takes them into her home while bidding a harsh farewell to Donald. A final insult is dealt to Donald when Dale emerges from the house to take the candy Donald had brought as a gift. Embittered, Donald walks back home.

== Voice cast ==
- Donald Duck: Clarence Nash
- Daisy Duck: Gloria Blondell
- Chip: Helen Silbert
- Dale: Dessie Miller

== Song ==
The short introduced Daisy's theme song "Daisy Mae", and in later appearances, Donald can be heard whistling or quacking the tune, such as in Dude Duck, Out on a Limb and Chips Ahoy. The music was also reused for the song "Meet Me Down on Main Street" recorded by the Mellomen.

=== Lyrics ===
Daisy, Daisy you're the one that's got me captivated,

Every time you look at me I get so addlepated,

And when I'm driving along the street

Everybody that I meet

Says "there goes the guy

that's crazy over sweet Daisy Mae".

== Home media ==
The short was released on December 11, 2007, on Walt Disney Treasures: The Chronological Donald, Volume Three: 1947-1950.
