= The Eyes Have It (film) =

1945 Donald Duck cartoon

- Theatrical release poster
- Directed by: Jack Hannah
- Story by: Bill Berg; Ralph Wright
- Produced by: Walt Disney
- Starring: Clarence Nash; Pinto Colvig; Florence Gill; Richard Conte
- Music by: Paul J. Smith
- Animation by: Bob Carlson; Hugh Fraser; Don Patterson; John Reed
- Layouts by: Yale Gracey
- Backgrounds by: Thelma Witmer
- Color process: Technicolor
- Production company: Walt Disney Productions
- Distributed by: RKO Radio Pictures; Buena Vista Home Entertainment
- Release date: March 30, 1945; (USA)
- Running time: 7 minutes
- Country: United States
- Language: English

The Eyes Have It is a Donald Duck animated short film produced in Technicolor by Walt Disney Productions, originally released on March 30, 1945, by RKO Radio Pictures. It was the final Disney short animated by Don Patterson and it was the only short to have his on-screen credit. The last Donald Duck cartoon to feature Pluto, it centers on Donald using hypnosis goggles to turn Pluto into various animal-like states.

== Plot ==
Donald receives a package in the mail containing a hypnosis kit with a pair of goggles. Under instructions that he should select a subject of low intelligence, he decides to test the goggles on Pluto. He hypnotizes Pluto to think he's a variety of animals—a mouse, a turtle, a chicken—and each time Pluto starts behaving like the animal, even partially taking on its form. While in his chicken form he gets into a fight with a rooster, so Donald hypnotizes him to think he's a lion. Pluto becomes ferocious and starts attacking the rooster, and the two run into Donald, inadvertently causing the goggles to shatter. Pluto chases Donald, now unable to control him, back to his house and wrecks much of the place, even destroying the hypnotism manual (which Donald scans in a desperate attempt to turn him back to normal) and all the chairs Donald uses to defend himself. They both end up breaking through the rooftop and running into midair, before plummeting violently to the ground, knocking Donald unconscious and returning Pluto to his normal self. Pluto licks Donald's face to wake him up, but thinking he's still in his lion state, Donald frantically rushes away. Pluto looks toward the camera with a confused expression.

== Voice cast ==
- Clarence Nash as Donald Duck
- Pinto Colvig as Pluto
- Florence Gill as Hen
- Richard Conte as Rooster

== Home media ==
The short was released on the DVD of Return from Witch Mountain in 2003, and again on December 6, 2005, on Walt Disney Treasures: The Chronological Donald, Volume Two: 1942-1946.

== Title ==
The title is a pun on the traditional announcement of the result of votes by division of the assembly, a part of parliamentary procedure in which the chairperson ultimately announces either "The ayes have it" or "The nays have it" depending on whether the motion has passed or failed the vote.
