= Daisy Duck =

Disney cartoon character

- Mickey Mouse / Donald Duck character
- First appearance: Don Donald (1937) (as Donna Duck); Mr. Duck Steps Out (1940) (as Daisy Duck)
- Created by: Carl Barks
- Designed by: Carl Barks
- Voiced by: Clarence Nash (1940); Ruth Clifford (1945–1950); Gloria Blondell (1948); Patricia Parris (1983–1989); Diane Michelle (1989–1999); Kath Soucie (1996); Tress MacNeille (1999–2022; 2025–present); Debra Wilson (2022–2025); (see voice actors)

In-universe information
- Full name: Daisy Duck
- Aliases: Katrien Duck (Dutch), Margarida Pato (Portuguese)
- Species: Duck
- Gender: Female
- Significant other: Donald Duck (boyfriend)
- Relatives: Lilly (grandmother); Dolores (grandmother); Drusilla (aunt); Matilda (aunt); April, May, and June (nieces); Almanda de Quack (cousin)

Daisy Duck is a cartoon character created by Carl Barks for The Walt Disney Company. She is an anthropomorphic white duck that has large eyelashes and ruffled tail feathers around her lowest region to suggest a skirt. She is often seen wearing a hair bow, blouse and heeled shoes. The girlfriend of Donald Duck, Daisy was introduced in the short film Mr. Duck Steps Out (1940) and was incorporated into Donald's comic stories several months later. Carl Barks, the screenwriter and lead storyboard artist for the film, was inspired by the 1937 short, Don Donald, that featured a Latin character named Donna Duck, to revive the concept of a female counterpart for Donald.

Daisy appeared in 11 short films between 1940 and 1954, and far later in Mickey's Christmas Carol (1983) and Fantasia 2000 (1999). In these roles, Daisy was always a supporting character, with the exception of Donald's Dilemma (1947). Daisy has received considerably more screen time in television, making regular appearances in Quack Pack (1996), Mickey Mouse Works (1999–2000), House of Mouse (2001–2003), Mickey Mouse Clubhouse (2006–2016), Mickey Mouse (2013–2019), Mickey Mouse Mixed-Up Adventures (2017–2021), The Wonderful World of Mickey Mouse (2020–2023), Mickey Mouse Funhouse (2021–2025) and Mickey Mouse Clubhouse+ (2025–present). Daisy has also appeared in several direct-to-video films such as Mickey's Once Upon a Christmas (1999), The Three Musketeers (2004) and Mickey's Twice Upon a Christmas (2004).

Daisy is a close friend of Clarabelle Cow and Clara Cluck in the comics and Minnie Mouse's best friend. Daisy usually shows a strong affinity towards Donald, although she is often characterized as being more sophisticated than him. Particularly in the comics, because of this, Daisy regularly becomes frustrated with Donald's immaturity, and on those occasions she will often go out on dates with Donald's cousin and rival Gladstone Gander instead. Daisy is the aunt of April, May, and June, three young girl ducks who bear resemblance to Huey, Dewey, and Louie.

== Characterization ==
Since her early appearances, Daisy is attracted to Donald and devoted to him in the same way he is often devoted to her. This is most clearly seen in Donald's Dilemma as Daisy is almost to the point of suicide after Donald forgets her. Despite this, she is shown to have her boyfriend wrapped around her finger and is often shown to keep him in line whenever his anger starts to boil.

Besides her love for Donald, Daisy is also shown to be more sophisticated and intelligent than him. This causes her to frequently be frustrated with his immaturity, and their relationship occasionally has an off-again, on-again nature as a result, particularly in the comic books. In comics, when Daisy is fighting with Donald or temporarily breaks up with him, she goes on dates with Donald's cousin Gladstone Gander instead. In Cured Duck, Daisy even gives Donald an ultimatum regarding his temper but later reforms in Donald's Dilemma. Daisy herself sometimes exhibits a temper, but she has much greater self-control than Donald.

In the Mouse Works/House of Mouse cartoons, she was sometimes portrayed as intrusive and overly talkative. She would invite herself in without asking and would tag along on trips where she was not wanted. In House of Mouse, Daisy was often waiting for her ″Big Break″, taking any and every opportunity to perform a number of talent acts on stage. Daisy was separated from Donald in that her quest for fame was not as prominent, and relied less on jealousy than eagerness.

== Appearance ==
Daisy is a white duck with an orange beak and legs. She usually has indigo eyeshadow, long distinct eyelashes and ruffled feathers around her lowest region to suggest a skirt. Like Donald, she typically doesn't wear pants, although she sometimes wears an actual skirt or longer dresses and clothes to cover her bottom.

She is usually seen sporting a blouse with puffed short sleeves and a v-neckline. She also wears a matching bow, heeled shoes and a single bangle on her wrist. The colors of her clothes change very often, but her signature colors are usually purple and pink.

The creators of the television series Quack Pack, in keeping with their modernization theme, reworked Daisy's character into a career-oriented woman and thus gave her a different appearance to match. While keeping with the purple and pink motif, Daisy usually wore long dresses with high-heeled shoes and instead of wearing her trademark hair bow, the feathers atop her head got the same treatment as her tail feathers had before; the animators arranged them in such a manner to appear as if Daisy was sporting a more modern short hairstyle.

House of Mouse got her a blue and purple employee uniform, with a blue bow, earrings, and a long ponytail. In Mickey Mouse Clubhouse, Daisy regained her purple blouse with a purple bow and shoes. She also wears a gold bangle and has a short ponytail, similar to the longer one seen in House of Mouse.

== Voice ==
Daisy Duck has been voiced by several different voice actors over the years. By far the most extensive work has been done by Tress MacNeille, who took on the role in 1999.

Clarence Nash voiced Daisy in her debut in Mr. Duck Steps Out. In the short, Nash voiced Daisy in a similar "duck-like" voice as Donald's. Starting with Donald's Crime (1945), Ruth Clifford took over vocal duties on the character, giving her a more "normal" female human voice. Clifford would voice Daisy in a further three shorts between 1945 and 1947, with her last being Sleepy Time Donald (1947). Gloria Blondell would take over the role briefly in Donald's Dilemma (1947). Clifford returned to the role starting in Donald's Dream Voice (1948) and Crazy Over Daisy (1950). Vivi Janiss voiced the character in Donald's Diary (1954), while renowned voice actress June Foray (Rocky the Flying Squirrel) voiced her in her final classic shorts appearance, the educational Donald Duck short How to Have an Accident at Work (1959).

Voice actress Janet Waldo, best known as the voice of Judy Jetson, voiced Daisy in the Disneyland Records album An Adaptation of Dickens' Christmas Carol, Performed by The Walt Disney Players (1974).

In 1983, Daisy was voiced by Patricia Parris in Mickey's Christmas Carol. Tony Anselmo voiced Daisy in Down and Out with Donald Duck (1987). Daisy was then voiced by Kath Soucie throughout her first regular television series Quack Pack (1996). From 1989 to 1999, Daisy was voiced by Diane Michelle in the anthology film The Spirit of Mickey, the first season of Mickey Mouse Works, and other media and games at the time. Michelle alternated in the role with Tress MacNeille for Mickey's Once Upon a Christmas. In 1999, MacNeille took over as Daisy's full-time voice starting with the second season of Mickey Mouse Works. MacNeille has voiced Daisy in the television series House of Mouse, Mickey Mouse Clubhouse, Mickey Mouse, Mickey Mouse Mixed-Up Adventures, Legend of the Three Caballeros, DuckTales, The Wonderful World of Mickey Mouse, the first season of Mickey Mouse Funhouse, and miscellaneous television specials, movies, and video games. Daisy was voiced by Russi Taylor in Fantasia 2000, although she has no lines other than a scream. In the second and third seasons of Mickey Mouse Funhouse, MacNeille was replaced by Debra Wilson as MacNeille was caught up in other projects. Wilson, the first (and so far only) African-American performer of Daisy, also voiced the character in the television specials Mickey Saves Christmas and Mickey and Friends Trick or Treats. MacNeille returned to voice Daisy in Mickey Mouse Clubhouse+.

== Donna Duck ==
Donna Duck made her sole animated appearance in the short film Don Donald (1937), directed by Ben Sharpsteen. It was the first installment of the Donald Duck film series and was also the first time Donald was shown with a love interest. In the story, Donald travels to Mexico to court a duck who is largely a female version of himself. She is portrayed with the same feisty temperament and as such was also voiced by Clarence Nash. At the end of the story, she spitefully abandons Donald in the desert after his car breaks down.

While Donna was not reused in film after her only appearance, she became an inspiration for the creation of Daisy. Donna appeared in early British Disney comics and was introduced in the American comic strip in 1951, as Daisy's unwitting rival for Donald's affections.

Other Disney characters, such as Goofy, were introduced under various names (Dippy Dawg) and appearances, leading some historians to conclude that Donna and Daisy are the same character. However, in these other instances, changes usually developed over time, during which the character remained in use. Donna, on the other hand, appeared only once, and it was a few years before a new female love interest for Donald was designed. There were many significant differences between the two characters all-at-once, in personality, nationality, name and attire.

According to The Encyclopedia of Animated Disney Shorts and the Big Cartoon DataBase, Don Donald is considered Daisy's debut. Don Donald is included on the Disney-produced DVD Best Pals: Donald and Daisy. In 1999, The Walt Disney Company released a collector's pin as part of their Countdown to the Millennium pin series, which reads "Daisy Duck debuts as Donna Duck 1937".

== History ==
Daisy debuted in theatrical animation and has appeared in a total of 15 films. She appeared in 12 Donald Duck short films. These are, in order of release, Mr. Duck Steps Out (1940), Donald's Crime (1945), Cured Duck (1945), Donald's Double Trouble (1946), Dumb Bell of the Yukon, Sleepy Time Donald (1947), Donald's Dilemma, Donald's Dream Voice (1948), Crazy Over Daisy (1950), Donald's Diary (1954) & How to Have an Accident at Work (1959) as Donald's unnamed wife. She also made a brief cameo in the Mickey Mouse short film The Nifty Nineties (1941). After the classic shorts era, Daisy appeared in Mickey's Christmas Carol (1983) and Fantasia 2000 (1999) with another cameo in Who Framed Roger Rabbit (1988).

=== First appearance ===
A still of scene where Daisy makes her entrance in Mr. Duck Steps Out (1940) (animated by Eddie Strickland).

Daisy Duck in her familiar name and design first appeared in Mr. Duck Steps Out (June 7, 1940). The short was directed by Jack King and scripted by Carl Barks. There Donald visits the house of his new romantic interest for their first known date. At first, Daisy acts shy and has her back turned to her visitor. But Donald soon notices her tail-feathers taking the form of a hand and signaling for him to come closer. But their time alone is soon interrupted by Huey, Dewey, and Louie who have followed their uncle and clearly compete with him for the attention of Daisy. Uncle and nephews take turns dancing the jitterbug with her while trying to get rid of each other. In their final effort, the three younger Ducks feed their uncle maize (corn) in the process of becoming popcorn. The process is completed within Donald himself who continues to move spastically around the house while maintaining the appearance of dancing. The short ends with an impressed Daisy showering her new boyfriend with kisses. Like her precursor, she was initially voiced by Clarence Nash, but later had a more ladylike voice.

The short stands out among other Donald shorts of the period for its use of modern music and surreal situations throughout.

=== Disney shorts: 1941–1947 ===
One year following her introduction in Mr. Duck Steps Out, Daisy, along with Donald and the nephews, made a brief cameo in the Mickey Mouse short The Nifty Nineties, cementing her position as a recurring character.

Daisy's speaking role again came 4 years later in Donald's Crime. While Daisy has a relatively small role in the film, her date with Donald is central to the plot and shows Donald's infatuation for her. Finding himself broke before the date; Donald steals money from his nephews, but afterward feels guilty. Donald imagines what Daisy might think of him knowing he stole money, and this leads him to reform in the end. Daisy was voiced in the film by actress Ruth Clifford, marking the first time Daisy had a "normal". The film also marked the first time Daisy appeared in an Academy Award nominated film (Best Animated Short).

Later that same year Daisy appeared again in Cured Duck (October 26, 1945). The short starts simply enough. Donald visits Daisy at her house. She asks him to open a window. He keeps trying to pull it open and eventually goes into a rage. By the time Daisy returns to the room, Donald has wrecked it. She demonstrates that the locking mechanism was on and criticizes his temper. She refuses to date Donald again until he learns to manage his anger. She claims Donald does not see her losing her own temper. Donald agrees to her terms and follows the surreal method of mail ordering an "insult machine", a device constantly hurling verbal and physical insults at him. He endures the whole process until feeling able to stay calm throughout it. He visits Daisy again and this time calmly opens the window. But when Daisy shows her boyfriend her new hat, his reaction is uncontrollable laughter. Daisy goes into a rage of her own and the short ends by pointing out that Donald is not the only Duck in need of anger management training. There is a continuation regarding her temper in the Mickey Mouse Works short "Donald's Dinner Date" where she and Donald have a date in a restaurant wherein they both end up with a bad temper thanks to Goofy.

Their relationship problems were also focused on in Donald's Double Trouble (June 28, 1946). This time Daisy criticizes his poor command of the English language and his less-than-refined manners. Unwilling to lose Daisy, Donald has to find an answer to the problem. But his solution involves his own look-alike who happens to have all the desired qualities. His unnamed look-alike happens to be unemployed at the moment and agrees to this plan. Donald provides the money for his dates with Daisy but soon comes to realize the look-alike serves as a rival suitor. The rest of the short focuses on his increasing jealousy and efforts to replace the look-alike during the next date. A failed attempt at a tunnel of love results in the two male Ducks exiting the tunnel in each other's hands by mistake. Daisy walks out completely drenched. She jumps up and down and sounds like a record played too fast as Donald and his look-alike run away.

In Dumb Bell of the Yukon, Daisy is the motivation behind Donald's hunting trip after he reads a letter from her saying she likes fur coats. Daisy briefly appears in a non-speaking role in Donald's daydream, imagining how pleased she will be.

Her next appearance in Sleepy Time Donald (May 9, 1947) involved Daisy attempting to rescue a sleepwalking Donald from wandering into danger. Donald is loose in an urban environment and the humor results from the problems Daisy herself suffers while trying to keep him safe.

=== First starring role ===
Daisy was the protagonist of Donald's Dilemma (July 11, 1947). In the short, Donald and Daisy are out on a date when a flower pot falls on his head. He regains consciousness soon enough but with some marked differences. Both his speaking and singing voices have been improved to the point of being able to enter a new career as a professional singer. He also acts more refined than usual. Most importantly Donald suffers from partial amnesia and has no memory of Daisy. Donald goes on becoming a well-known crooner and his rendition of When You Wish upon a Star becomes a hit. He is surrounded by female fans in his every step. Meanwhile, Daisy can't even approach her former lover and her loss results in a number of psychological symptoms. Various scenes feature her suffering from anorexia, insomnia, and self-described insanity. An often censored scene features her losing her will to live and contemplating various methods of suicide. She narrates her story to a psychologist who determines that Donald would regain his memory with another flower pot falling on his head but warns that his improved voice may also be lost along with his singing career. He offers Daisy a dilemma. Either the world has its singer, but Daisy loses him, or Daisy regains her Donald, but the world loses him. Posed with the question "her or the world", Daisy answers with a resounding and possessive scream of "Me, Me, Me". Soon Donald has returned to his old self and has forgotten about his career. His fans forget about him. But Daisy has regained her lover. This is considered a darkly humorous look at their relationship.

=== Final Donald Duck shorts: 1948–1954 ===
Daisy also appears in Donald's Dream Voice (1948), where she encourages Donald to have faith in himself.

1950's Crazy Over Daisy features Donald going to Daisy's house for a date, and getting distracted by a fight with Chip 'n' Dale. The short introduced Daisy's theme song "Crazy Over Daisy", and in later appearances, Donald can be heard whistling the tune, such as in "Out on a Limb" and "Donald the Dude Duck".

Daisy's final appearance in the Golden Age of American animation was in Donald's Diary (1954). There she played the role of a beautiful lady who manages to start a long-term relationship with Donald. But after having a nightmare about the anxieties that would come from married life, Donald runs out on her and joins the French Foreign Legion. Several scenes of the short imply that Daisy has had several previous relationships with men. Donald carves their names on a tree. Not noticing than the opposing side of the tree features her name alongside that of several other boyfriends. The marriage scene in Donald's dream featured a group of sailors waving goodbye to Daisy and mourning the loss of their apparent lover. The story bore little continuity with the "real" Donald and Daisy as Huey, Dewey, and Louie appeared as Daisy's younger brothers. It was the only time in which Daisy's parents are seen.

=== Later theatrical appearances ===
In 1959, Daisy made a cameo in Donald in Mathmagic Land. When the Spirit finds Donald's mind to be too cluttered with "Antiquated Ideas", "Bungling", "False Concepts", "Superstitions" and "Confusion", there is a picture of her in the background that is signed "Love, Daisy".

Daisy appeared in Mickey's Christmas Carol in 1983, playing the character Isabelle, the neglected love interest of a young Ebenezer Scrooge, played by Scrooge McDuck. The film was Daisy's first theatrical appearance in almost 30 years and was also the first time she appeared apart from Donald, although the nature of the film was that of Disney characters "playing" other characters and wasn't part of any story continuity. Daisy was voiced by Patricia Parris in the film.

In 1988, Daisy made a cameo appearance in the finale of Who Framed Roger Rabbit along with many other Disney characters.

Daisy's most recent theatrical appearance was Fantasia 2000, released in late 1999. Like the original Fantasia, the film constituted various musical segments. Donald and Daisy appeared in non-speaking roles for the seventh of eight segments, set to the Pomp and Circumstance marches. The segment is a retelling of Noah's Ark with the ducks acting as Noah's assistants. Donald and Daisy become separated in the chaos of the flood and each presumes the other to have drowned until they discover each other towards the near end afterwards. Daisy kisses Donald in happiness and joy when they are reunited and the duck couple walk out of the ark hand-in-hand admiring their new home.

=== Non-theatrical appearances ===
Daisy appeared in the direct-to-video films Mickey's Once Upon a Christmas, Mickey's Twice Upon a Christmas and Mickey, Donald, Goofy: The Three Musketeers.

== In comics ==
According to the unofficial timeline of Don Rosa, Daisy was born in 1920. According to Rosa, Daisy is Donald's sister-in-law – Daisy's brother had married Donald's twin sister, Della Duck, and together, the two became the parents of Huey, Dewey, and Louie Duck. This is his explanation of why the triplets tend to call her "Aunt Daisy" while no such courtesy is given to Gladstone Gander for example. Don Rosa has said that he considers Donald and Daisy to be nonrelated and that Duck simply is the Duckburg universe equal to Smith, being a common surname.

Donna Duck served as a precursor for Daisy in both animation and comics. She first appeared in a one-page illustration titled "Don Donald" and published in Good Housekeeping #3701 (January 1937). The page was illustrated by Thomas "Tom" Wood (1870s – October 4, 1940) who was head of the Walt Disney Studios' publicity department from 1933 until his death. She made a brief appearance in the "Donald and Donna" comic strip published in Mickey Mouse Weekly from May 15 to August 21, 1937. The Weekly was a United Kingdom publication and the strip was illustrated at the time by William A. Ward.

Daisy made her first comics appearance on November 4, 1940. She was introduced as the new neighbor of Donald and his potential love interest. The Donald Duck comic strip was at the time scripted by Bob Karp and illustrated by Al Taliaferro. She was seemingly soft-spoken but had a fiery temper and Donald often found himself a victim to her rage. For example, one strip had Daisy waiting for Donald to carve their names and their love for each other on a tree, only to discover the male Duck had carved "Daisy loves Donald" with her name hardly visible and his name in prominent bold letters, resulting in her breaking her umbrella on his head and dismissing him as a "conceited little pup".

Her first original comic book appearance was a cameo in the story "The Mighty Trapper" by Carl Barks, first published in Walt Disney's Comics and Stories No. 36 (September 1943), wherein Huey, Dewey, and Louie ask her to lend them an old fur coat. Barks did not use the character again until "Donald Tames His Temper" (January 1946) when Daisy demands that Donald learns to manage his anger as a New Year's resolution. Donald has to agree but points early on that Daisy herself has the temper of a "wild-eyed wildcat".

Her next appearance by Barks in "Biceps Blues" (June 1946) introduced a key concept to their relationship. When Daisy seems impressed by a certain type of male, Donald is forced to emulate that type, no matter how unsuited Donald is for emulating it successfully. In this early case, Daisy envies her "old school chum" Susy Swan for dating a notable weightlifter. Donald at first protests that she seems too impressed by a "gorilla" just because the "muscle-bound buffalo" can lift 300 pounds. But when Daisy simply ignores him and daydreams about dating Hercules, Donald decides to start weightlifting. The rest of the story focuses on his ineptitude at exercising and the eventual efforts of Huey, Dewey, and Louie to cheer him up by various tricks pointing to Donald becoming stronger. But when Donald arranges a demonstration for Daisy, Susy, and her boyfriend, their tricks are not able to save him from ridicule. Daisy then chases Donald in anger (Donald, in turn, chases Huey, Dewey, and Louie in anger) while Susy boasts about her luck in men to her weightlifter boyfriend, who simply grunts and nods and fails to understand her words. Daisy failed to see that Susy's boyfriend is strong but otherwise not too gifted, whereas Donald is one who would go great lengths for her.

Daisy continued to make frequent appearances in stories by Barks but the next important one for her development was "Wintertime Wager" (January 1948). There she first attempts to act as the voice of reason between competing cousins Donald Duck and Gladstone Gander and in fact manages to prevent Donald losing his house to Gladstone because of a wager. This story established that both of them wanted to be in her good graces. Their next joined meeting in "Gladstone Returns" (August 1948) has Donald and Gladstone competing in raising enough money for her charity effort.

Their rivalry increased when "Donald's Love Letters" (December 1949) revealed that both cousins were romantically interested in Daisy. From then on many stories by both Barks and others would develop around this love triangle. Daisy in turns dates both of them but this fact does not prevent the two competing suitors from attempting to earn more of her affection or trying to embarrass each other in front of her. Daisy can be counted on to be making regular appearances alongside either of them for several years to come. Often it would appear as if Gladstone had the upper hand in winning Daisy due to his luck, only to find fate thwarts his plans, such as a contest where the man who hunts the most turkeys gets to have dinner with Daisy, who has won a beauty contest. Gladstone wins the turkey hunt but finds himself having dinner with an ugly woman who is the runner-up queen, as Daisy is incapacitated, and Donald is the one nursing her.

Similarly, Daisy's precursor Donna and Daisy herself were featured together as rivals for Donald's affection in a newspaper strip published on August 7, 1951. In her last appearance, on August 11, 1951, Donna had a fiancé, a caricature of Disney cartoonist Manuel Gonzales, establishing a distinction between her character and Daisy.

In the comics, Daisy is also a member of a local gossip group called the "Chit-Chat Society", which plays bridge and sponsors charity fund-raisers. The core membership includes Clarabelle Cow and Clara Cluck, though occasionally some other unnamed characters appear.

In later years, Carl Barks 'modernized' Daisy in two stories: 'The not-so-ancient mariner' and 'Hall of the mermaid queen'. In the first story, Daisy is wearing a lot of different wigs and outfits. Gladstone Gander is also seen wearing a wig and a new wardrobe in the story. In the second story, Daisy has short, curly hair and a bow that is much smaller than usual.

In the 1950s, Disney launched a series of stories titled "Daisy Duck's Diary", where Daisy was given more of a leading role. This series, originally by such cartoonists as Dick Moores, Jack Bradbury, Tony Strobl and Carl Barks, have continued to the present day in Italy, Denmark and the Netherlands.

Since 1999 Daisy, like Donald Duck has her own magazine in the Netherlands. She had one in Brazil between 1986 and 1997, and a short-lived series in 2004 with republications of old stories.

=== Super Daisy ===
Daisy as Paperinika

Since the early 1970s, Daisy has been featured as a superhero crime fighter in Italian Disney comics. Daisy's alter ego as Super Daisy (Paperinika in Italian) was designed by writer Guido Martina and artist Giorgio Cavazzano as a female counterpart to the "Duck Avenger" ("Paperinik" in Italian). While Donald's superhero persona was originally created to place Donald into situations where he was finally a "winner" (versus his usual portrayal as a "loser"), when Super Daisy appeared in the same story as the Duck Avenger, she then became the "winner" and Donald was once more relegated to the role of "loser". This upset some children, who complained to the comics' editors, which resulted in the Italian comics ceasing to depict Daisy as a superhero, although Super Daisy continued to be featured in the Disney comics in Brazil.

As Super Daisy, Daisy has no superpowers but instead uses devices created by high society fashion designer Genialina Edy Son. Genialina personally designed Daisy's costume, as well as supplying her with crime-fighting gear such as sleeping pills and a James Bond-esque sports car. Frequently, Super Daisy both fights alongside and against the Duck Avenger. In the Brazilian stories, Super Daisy often teams up with other Disney comic superheroes, such as Super Goof (Goofy), Super Gilly ("Gilbert"), and the Red Bat (Fethry Duck).

While the Duck Avenger's main goal is enforcing justice in Duckburg, and proving himself better than Donald's usual, unlucky self, Super Daisy acts mostly on an extreme, somewhat warped form of feminism, donning her alternate identity to prove that women are better than men at whatever they do, openly antagonizing the Duck Avenger to prove her point. Later stories, such as the "Hero Club" inspired Italian story "Ultraheroes", show Super Daisy and the Duck Avenger at the center of a weird love triangle: Super Daisy, despite their bickering eventually warms to the Duck Avenger, feeling drawn to his righteous persona. They both feel unable to pursue their relationship, as they feel themselves cheating their non-superhero selves, as they do not realize each other's identity as companions in everyday life.

=== Daisy and The Mysteries of Paris ===
Daisy Duck as she appears in the comics

Daisy Duck as The Rose of Paris

Set in Revolution-era France, Daisy and The Mysteries of Paris (French: Daisy et les mystères de Paris) is an eight-issue comic series featuring Daisy Duck as the best friend and lady in waiting of Queen Marie Ducklette. Secretly, Daisy is a mysterious masked swordswoman called The Rose of Paris, who helps the poor and those in need, as well as preventing attempts to steal the queen's throne. She must also protect her friends Donald Duck and Ludwig Von Drake from the plots of The Ignobles.

The first three issues were illustrated by Carlo Cid Lauro, and currently the series is published by Panini Italia.

The series consists of eight stories released in four issues:

- Episode 1: "The Sapphires of the Tsar"
- Episode 2: "The Enigma of the Seal"
- Episode 3: "The Stagecoach to Calais"
- Episode 4: "The Revenge of the Thistle"
- Episode 5: "The Secret of Marie Ducklette"
- Episode 6: "The Return of the Scarlet Swordsman"
- Episode 7: "Escape From The Bastille"
- Episode 8: "Adieu, Rose of Paris!"

== Name in other languages ==
- Arabic: زيزي, romanized: Zīzī
- Bulgarian: Дейзи Дък, romanized: Deĭzi Dŭk
- Croatian: Vlatka Patka
- Danish: Andersine And
- Dutch: Katrien Duck
- Faroese: Dúnhild Dunna
- Finnish: Iines Ankka
- Greek: Νταίζη Ντακ, romanized: Daízi Dak
- Hebrew: דייזי דאק, romanized: Deizi Dak
- Hungarian: Dézi Kacsa
- Indonesian: Desi Bebek
- Icelandic: Andrésína Önd
- Italian: Paperina
- Japanese: デイジーダック, romanized: Deijī Dakku
- Korean: 데이지 덕, romanized: Deiji Deog
- Norwegian: Dolly Duck
- Polish: Kaczka Daisy
- Portuguese: Margarida
- Russian: Дейзи Дак, romanized: Dejzi Dak
- Simplified Chinese: 黛丝 / 黛西; traditional Chinese: 黛絲 / 黛西; pinyin: Dàisī / Dàixī
- Odia: ଡେ଼ସି ବତକ, romanized: Deesi Batak
- Spanish: Pata Daisy
- Swedish: Kajsa Anka
- Turkish: Deyzi
- Serbian: Пата Патка, romanized: Pata Patka
- Vietnamese: Vịt Daisy

== Disney parks ==
At the Walt Disney Parks and Resorts and on the Disney Cruise Line ships, Daisy is a character for meet-and-greets, parades, and shows. Her semi-elusiveness has made her extra popular to an extent, adding to the fact that Daisy is a member of the Sensational Six, therefore making Daisy merchandise even more appealing to collectors. After Disney World expanded Fantasyland in 2012, Daisy became available for meet-and-greets at Pete's Silly Sideshow. At Epcot, she appears at the main entrance. She has also appeared in restaurants such as the Tusker House and Minnie's Springtime Diner at Hollywood & Vine.

Daisy appears in an MMORPG game called Toontown Online, based on the theme parks, where she walks around Daisy Gardens leaving comments about passing toons.

== Television ==
Daisy in Quack Pack (1996)

In the 1996 television series Quack Pack, Daisy was presented as a much more liberated (and patient) woman than in her previous appearances, where she was employed as a television station reporter, with Donald as her cameraman. The couple also seem to have a better and steadier relationship compared to the other series. In Quack Pack, Daisy had a pet iguana named Knuckles.

Daisy also appeared in the later television series Mickey Mouse Works and House of Mouse as a regular character. She is also part of the main characters in Mickey Mouse Clubhouse and its spin-offs Minnie's Bow-Toons, Mickey Mouse Mixed-Up Adventures, Mickey Mouse Funhouse and Mickey Mouse Clubhouse+. She has also appeared in the new series of Mickey Mouse shorts and the continuation series on Disney+, The Wonderful World of Mickey Mouse.

Daisy made her first appearance in the 2017 DuckTales series in the season 3 episode "Louie's Eleven", with MacNeille once again providing her voice. In this version, Daisy and Donald meet for the first time, and her appearance is similar to the theatrical short, Donald's Diary (1954). She is depicted as having a temper like Donald and is an assistant to Duckburg trendsetter, Emma Glamour. After Donald attempts to infiltrate one of Glamour's parties to help his band, the Three Caballeros, he and Daisy end up trapped in an elevator and develop a mutual attraction to each other. As of the episode "New Gods on the Block!", they became a couple.

== Video games ==
In the Kingdom Hearts video game series, Daisy Duck (Japanese: デイジーダック, Hepburn: Deijī Dakku) appears as a countess in Disney Castle. In Kingdom Hearts II, she scolds Donald for being gone too long. She makes a cameo appearance in Kingdom Hearts Birth By Sleep and Kingdom Hearts III.

Daisy is a playable character in the video game Disney Think Fast and a playable race driver in the Nintendo 64 and Game Boy Color racing game Mickey's Speedway USA. She is also a playable character in Disney Golf for the PlayStation 2 and in Disney's Party for the GameCube and Game Boy Advance.

For the Nintendo Wii: In Epic Mickey, a robot version of Daisy appears in the game, and in Dance Dance Revolution Disney Grooves, Daisy appears as one of the random backup dancers.

Daisy runs the Daisy Gardens neighborhood in Disney's Toontown Online.

Daisy Duck was later introduced in update ten of Disney Dreamlight Valley.

== See also ==
- Duck family (Disney) / Donald Duck / Huey, Dewey, and Louie
- Donald Duck universe / Donald Duck in comics / Disney comics
