= Donald's Gold Mine =

1942 Donald Duck cartoon

- Theatrical release poster
- Directed by: Dick Lundy
- Produced by: Walt Disney
- Starring: Clarence Nash
- Music by: Oliver Wallace
- Color process: Technicolor
- Production company: Walt Disney Productions
- Distributed by: RKO Radio Pictures
- Release date: July 24, 1942 (U.S.)
- Running time: 7 minutes
- Country: United States
- Language: English

Donald's Gold Mine (or Donald's Golden Mine in some versions) is a 1942 Donald Duck short film by Walt Disney Productions.

== Plot ==
While working as a gold miner, Donald Duck engages in a series of tit-for-tat attacks between himself and his donkey. Afterwards, Donald accidentally gets the head of his pickaxe stuck on him. In his attempts to dislodge it, Donald fortuitously uncovers a rich vein of gold. In his excitement, he tosses the nuggets up into the air, and they spook the donkey as they clatter to the ground. The donkey takes off, dragging the minecart, and Donald along with it, off to the entry chute of the nearby ore processor.

Donald is thrown into a fully automatic processing facility which grinds and pulverizes the mined rocks, separating the gold from them. While Donald avoids the worst predicaments through sheer luck, he gets comically washed, scrubbed, and shaken about. Eventually, he is tipped into a gold bar-making machine. The donkey, nervous about his owner's fate, follows his path to the machine's output conveyor belt. A gold bar emerges with Donald's hat on top, initially leading the donkey to believe that Donald has died. But shortly afterwards, the donkey laughs in delight when Donald emerges very much alive and well from the machine, encrusted in gold and thoroughly annoyed.

== Voice cast ==
- Clarence Nash as Donald Duck and Donkey

== Home media ==
The short was released on December 6, 2005, on Walt Disney Treasures: The Chronological Donald, Volume Two: 1942-1946.
