= Crazy with the Heat =

1947 Donald Duck cartoon

- Directed by: Bob Carlson
- Story by: Ralph Wright; Bill Berg
- Produced by: Walt Disney
- Starring: Clarence Nash; Pinto Colvig; Fred Shields
- Music by: Oliver Wallace
- Color process: Technicolor
- Production company: Walt Disney Productions
- Distributed by: RKO Radio Pictures
- Release date: August 1, 1947 (U.S.)
- Running time: 6:01
- Country: United States
- Language: English

Crazy with the Heat is a 1947 Walt Disney Productions cartoon featuring Donald Duck and Goofy. This was the last Donald & Goofy short film produced.

== Plot ==
The cartoon begins on a Sahara Desert road, and Donald and Goofy's car breaks down and runs out of Gas. Donald and Goofy are now forced to walk down the desert path. Eventually, Donald collapses from dehydration. Goofy then pulls out a canteen and drinks it. Donald snatches it from Goofy, pointing out they're lost. Goofy pulls out a tiny map to see if they are going in the right direction with a magnifying glass, but soon the map catches fire due to the glass' ray hitting the map. In a panic, Goofy snatches the canteen from Donald to put it out, wasting all their water in the process. One last drop falls into the sand, which Donald immediately starts digging for.

Goofy then decides to go out on his own. He goes west in the desert, but then sees a soda fountain, and decides to wet his whistle. There an Arab Spirit appears and Goofy asks him for a soda. Just as Goofy was about to enjoy his soda, it vanishes, revealing it was just a mirage. Goofy, confused, asks the spirit what happened, but he gives Goofy two more sodas. Goofy tries again to drink another soda, but they vanish as well. The spirit then offers four more sodas. After whistling for a short time, Goofy tries to grab all four sodas, but they just vanish. Goofy, now fed up, leaves the mirage, but the spirit commands him to owe him six bucks, but Goofy refuses. The spirit forces Goofy to clean several dishes.

Meanwhile, Donald, exhausted from the heat, complains for water, and soon sees an Iceberg, and rushes to hug it, but the iceberg vanishes. Donald tries again and again, but the iceberg was just a mirage.

Donald and Goofy crash into each other, and break several dishes. The angry spirit appears and attacks them with a sword, and Goofy and Donald run away, but soon spot a Camel. They jump on to the camel and escape the desert, ending the cartoon.

== Voice cast ==
- Clarence Nash as Donald Duck
- Pinto Colvig as Goofy
- Fred Shields as the Oasis Soda Fountain Proprietor

== Home media ==
The short was released on December 11, 2007, on Walt Disney Treasures: The Chronological Donald, Volume Three: 1947-1950.

== See also ==
- List of ghost films
