= How to Have an Accident at Work =

1959 Donald Duck cartoon

- Directed by: Charles A. Nichols
- Story by: Jack Kinney; Bill Berg
- Produced by: Walt Disney
- Starring: Clarence Nash; Lucille Bliss; Bill Thompson
- Music by: Oliver Wallace
- Animation by: Jerry Hathcock; Fred Kopietz; George Nicholas; Harvey Toombs
- Layouts by: Ernie Nordli
- Backgrounds by: Al Dempster
- Production company: Walt Disney Productions
- Distributed by: Buena Vista Film Distribution Company
- Release date: September 2, 1959
- Running time: 7 minutes
- Country: United States
- Language: English

How to Have an Accident at Work is a 1959 animated short educational film featuring Donald Duck. It was released by Walt Disney Productions.

== Plot ==
Donald Duck is very careful at home, but at work that is a different issue as he has multiple accidents. J.J. Fate shows up to inform us how accidents are not predetermined, but instead are the result of carelessness.

== Voice cast ==
- Clarence Nash as Donald Duck
- Bill Thompson as J.J. Fate
- Lucille Bliss as Donald's son

== Home media ==
The short was released on November 11, 2008 on Walt Disney Treasures: The Chronological Donald, Volume Four: 1951-1961.
