= The Trial of Donald Duck =

1948 Donald Duck cartoon

- Theatrical release poster
- Directed by: Jack King
- Story by: Dan MacManus
- Produced by: Walt Disney
- Starring: Clarence Nash
- Music by: Oliver Wallace
- Animation by: Jack Boyd; Ed Aardel; Paul Allen; Fred Kopietz
- Layouts by: Don Griffith
- Backgrounds by: Merle Cox
- Production company: Walt Disney Productions
- Distributed by: RKO Radio Pictures, Inc.
- Release date: July 30, 1948
- Running time: 6:40
- Country: United States
- Language: English

The Trial of Donald Duck is a 1948 animated short film featuring Donald Duck. It was released by Walt Disney Productions.

== Plot ==
Donald is trying to have his lunch illegally on park grass with the pigeons when it began to rain and he had to say goodbye to them. Beginning to rain hard, he hides into the shelter of a canopy to a fancy restaurant. Imagining a hot cup of coffee, and having a nickel to have one, he walked in where a waiter named Pierre seated him. As he only has a nickel, Donald feels that he can use it to get a cup of coffee. Pierre recommended on the menu "pomme de terre à la somme de la Louis", but Donald replied coffee. Pierre then asked in French if he wanted it small, Donald replied yes and asked for a regular Java. However, thinking he wanted small Donald was received a cup of Espresso which is the size of a thimble. Donald flies into a rage for given the wrong coffee and refused to pay.

As Pierre tries to figure out what to do, he spots Donald unpacking his dishes from his lunch box. Being sneaky, Pierre decides to charge Donald for the food that he brought into the restaurant. This leads to Donald receiving a bill for $35.99. Once again angered at the injustice, Donald flies into a rage, and the matter is taken to court.

Donald's lawyer portrays and confesses him as a victim in the entire mess, but the judge rules in favor of the restaurant and gives Donald three choices: (1) pay ten dollars, (2) wash dishes for ten days, or (3) face time in prison, much to Pierre's satisfaction.

However, Donald cleverly chooses the second option by spending his time at the restaurant's kitchen sink destroying the dishes after cleaning them, as the judge didn't stipulate on how he should wash them for ten days. Realizing that he made a big mistake of provoking Donald and that it's causing severe financial losses for the restaurant, Pierre pleads with Donald to stop by promising to let the whole matter go, but Donald refuses and continues with his destructive 'chore' in order to get back at the sneaky waiter, much to the latter's distraught.

== Voice cast ==
- Clarence Nash as Donald Duck

== Home media ==
The short was released on December 11, 2007 on Walt Disney Treasures: The Chronological Donald, Volume Three: 1947-1950.
