= No Sail =

1945 Donald Duck cartoon

- Theatrical release poster
- Directed by: Jack Hannah
- Written by: Dick Kinney; Ralph Wright
- Produced by: Walt Disney
- Starring: George Johnson; Clarence Nash
- Music by: Oliver Wallace
- Animation by: Bob Carlson; Hugh Fraser; John Reed; Judge Whitaker
- Layouts by: Yale Gracey
- Backgrounds by: Thelma Whitmer
- Color process: Technicolor
- Production company: Walt Disney Productions
- Distributed by: RKO Radio Pictures
- Release date: September 7, 1945 (U.S.)
- Running time: 7:30
- Country: United States
- Language: English

No Sail is an animated short film produced by Walt Disney Productions in 1945, featuring Donald Duck and Goofy. It follows Donald and Goofy, who survive using improbable methods after being stranded at sea.

== Plot ==
Goofy and Donald board a coin-operated sailboat, which leaves Donald constantly depositing nickels into the slot to keep the sail functioning. Donald loses his temper right after using his last nickel and triggers a tilt sensor in the mechanism, stranding him and Goofy in the open ocean. While attempting to attract the attention of a passing ship, a nickel flys out of Goofy's hat and rolls along the side of the boat. As Donald fails to catch it before it rolls into the ocean, Goofy waves "bon-voyage" to the ship and its passengers instead of signaling them for help. After several more days, they fight over a fish that jumps into the boat, but are beaten by a seagull. They then attempt to hunt the seagull with a club, but are beaten again. Donald realizes that sharks are beginning to circle, but Goofy mistakes them for regular fish. Goofy attempts to fish for the sharks, but inadvertently, and obliviously, casts Donald out on the hook. Donald fends off the sharks while Goofy slowly tries to untangle the backlash of line on the reel. Donald accidentally falls bill-first into the coin slot after Goofy yanks him back into the boat and drops him upon being told to "Put me down!", which sends the mast shooting out and folding into place. Goofy then sails the boat back towards land while Donald throws a tantrum at being stuck in the mechanism.

== Voice cast ==
- Donald Duck: Clarence Nash
- Goofy: George Johnson

== Home media ==
The short was released on December 6, 2005 on Walt Disney Treasures: The Chronological Donald, Volume Two: 1942-1946.

Additional release include:

- Walt Disney's Classic Cartoon Favorites Extreme Adventure Fun Volume 7
