= George Johnson (actor) =

American voice actor

- Born: February 14, 1898; Woodland Hills, California, United States
- Died: February 19, 1961 (aged 63); Manhattan, New York City, U.S.
- Resting place: Forest Lawn Memorial Park
- Occupation: Voice actor
- Years active: 1940–1960
- Spouse: Joan Besser (m. 1929; died 1960)
- Children: 2

George A. Johnson (February 14, 1898 – February 19, 1961) was an American voice actor, who is best known for voicing Goofy from 1940 to 1942.

== Filmography ==
- Tugboat Mickey (1940) - Goofy
- Goofy's Glider (1940) - Goofy
- Billposters (1940) - Goofy
- Baggage Buster (1941) - Goofy
- Mickey's Birthday Party (1942) - Goofy
- Symphony Hour (1942) - Goofy
- No Sail (1945) - Goofy
- Rawhide (1960) - Sam
