= Brad Case =

American animator (1912-2006)

Brad Case (June 24, 1912 – March 19, 2006) was an animator and sequence director. He has also worked as a layout artist, storyboard artist, and a story director. His collaborative partners in animation include Ub Iwerks, Raphael Wolff, Paul Fennell and Larry Harmon.

He was born Arthur Bradford Case to Arthur James Case and Clara T. Skelly in Los Angeles. Case attended Lincoln High School, where he was on the staff of The Lincolnian along with future animation writer Cal Howard and was elected student body president in 1931. At age 20 in 1932, he was employed by his father as a papermaker at the Los Angeles Paper Manufacturing Company. He was married that year to Dorothy Faye Sullivan.

He began his career as an animator in Bambi. His first recorded screen credit was for the 1944 Donald Duck short The Plastics Inventor. He subsequently worked on additional feature films for Disney such as Song of the South and Make Mine Music in 1946. He was employed in 1949 at both the Lantz and Wolff studios. With the year-long closure of the Lantz studio, Case went to New York for eight months to work on animated TV commercials.

In the 1960s and 1970s, Case worked as a director for popular TV series such as The Dick Tracy Show, The Pink Panther and Friends, Baggy Pants and the Nitwits, What's New, Mr. Magoo?, and The Fantastic Four. He was also an animator on The Yogi Bear Show. He continued to contribute to television animation through the 1980s as a sequence director in The Transformers, G.I. Joe and Jem.

Case has worked at a variety of studios including Iwerks, Disney, MGM, Walter Lantz, Raphael G. Wolfe, John Sutherland, Paul Fennell, Tempo, Calvin Co., Academy Studios, ERA Productions, Larry Harmon, Hanna-Barbera, Bill Melendez, UPA, Warner Bros., Sam Nicholson, Sanrio, DePatie-Freleng (and its later incarnation, Marvel Productions), Graz Entertainment and New World from 1934 until 1999.

He received the Animation guild Golden Award in 1985. His son, Dale Case, also became an animator.

== Others ==
- It Was a Short Summer, Charlie Brown – September 27, 1969
- Jetsons: The Movie – July 6, 1990
