= Oliver Wallace =

English-American composer (1887–1963)

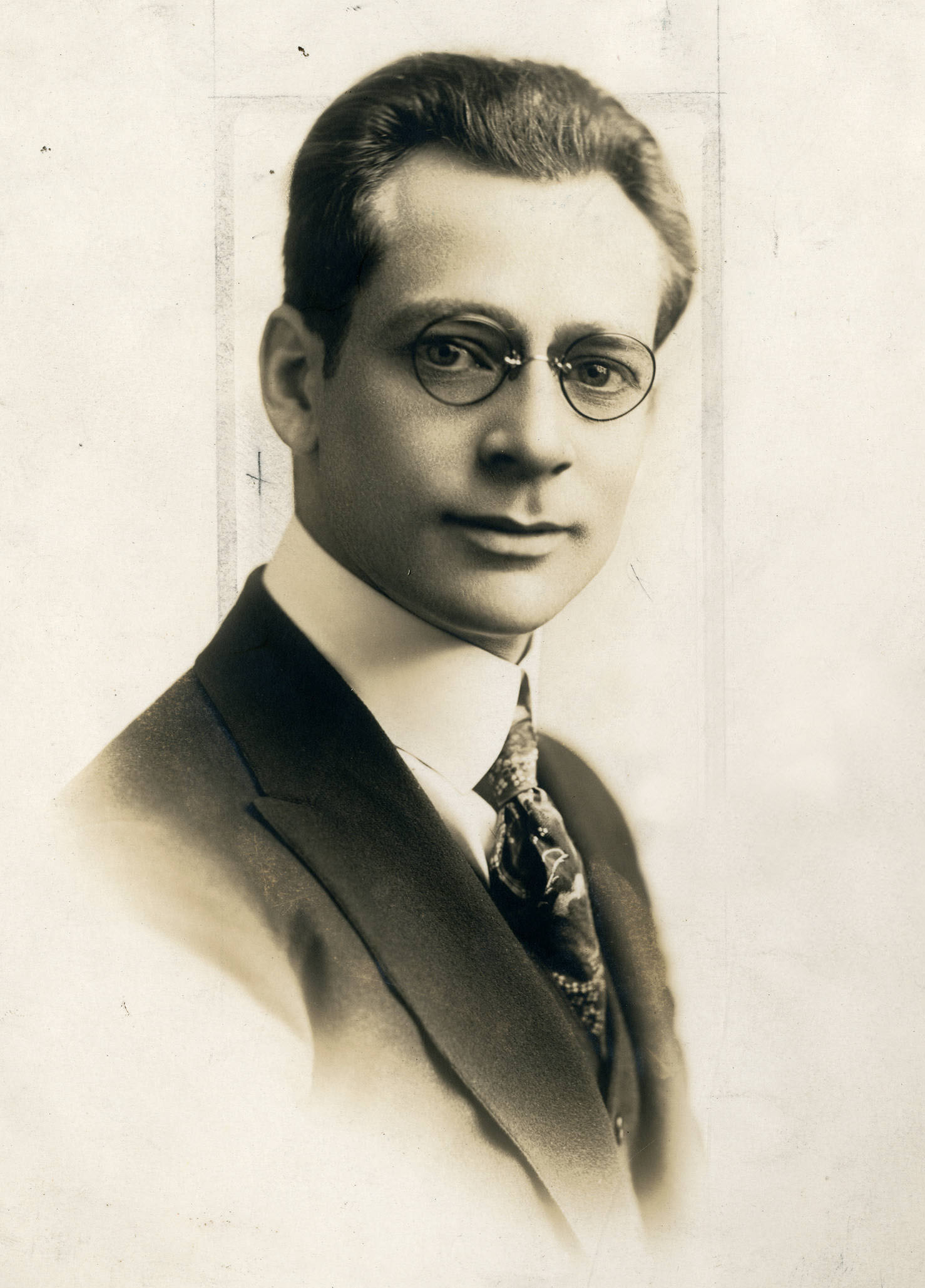
- Wallace in 1923
- Born: August 6, 1887; London, United Kingdom
- Died: September 15, 1963 (aged 76); Los Angeles, California, US
- Occupation: Composer
- Musical career
- Genres: Film score, musical theatre
- Years active: 1911–63

Signature
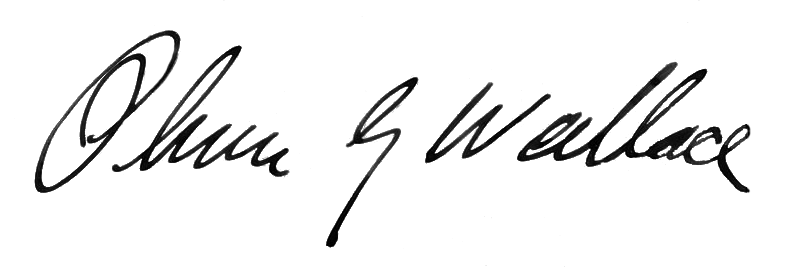

Oliver George Wallace (August 6, 1887 – September 15, 1963) was a British-American composer and conductor from London. He was especially known for his film music compositions, which were written for many animation, documentary, and feature films from Walt Disney Studios.

== Biography ==
Wallace was born on August 6, 1887, in London. After completing his musical training, he emigrated to the Canada originally, and then shortly after to the United States in 1904, becoming a US citizen ten years later. He reportedly studied at the Chicago School of Music in the Near North neighborhood of Chicago, Illinois.

He initially worked primarily on the West Coast in Seattle as a conductor of theater orchestras and as an organist accompanying silent films. At the same time, he also made a name as a songwriter, writing tunes such as the popular "Hindustan". With the advent of the talking film era, he worked increasingly for Hollywood film studios in the 1930s.

In 1936, he joined the Disney Studios and was originally hired to pose as a live-action model for both Dopey and Sneezy in Snow White and the Seven Dwarfs (1937) and later provided the voice for Mr. Winky and the whistling sound effect for Ichabod Crane in The Adventures of Ichabod and Mr. Toad (1949). He quickly became one of the most important composers in the studio for animated short films and provided the music for 139 of these shorts. One of his best-known pieces is the song "Der Fuehrer's Face" from the 1942 Donald Duck propaganda cartoon, though he was uncredited. This parody of a Horst Wessel song was, mainly through the version by Spike Jones and His City Slickers, one of the biggest hits during the Second World War. Other shorts he scored included Ben and Me (1953), a short about Benjamin Franklin and a mouse named Amos, and the Oscar-winning Toot, Whistle, Plunk and Boom (1953), the first cartoon to use the new CinemaScope process.

Walt Disney also had Wallace score full-length films for the studios for over 27 years. He started writing the score for Dumbo (1941), for which he, together with Frank Churchill, won his first and only Oscar in 1942. In addition to composing scores for live-action films such as Victory Through Air Power (1943) and White Wilderness (1958), he went on to score The Adventures of Ichabod and Mr. Toad (1949), Cinderella (1950) along with Paul J. Smith, Alice in Wonderland (1951), and Peter Pan (1953). His last work for a Disney animated feature was Lady and the Tramp (1955). He received four other Oscar nominations for the music to Victory Through Air Power with Edward H. Plumb and Paul J. Smith (losing to Alfred Newman for The Song of Bernadette), Cinderella with Paul J. Smith (losing to Adolph Deutsch and Roger Edens for Annie Get Your Gun), Alice in Wonderland (losing to Johnny Green and Saul Chaplin for An American in Paris), and White Wilderness (losing to Dimitri Tiomkin for The Old Man and the Sea). A common characteristic of all these productions was the cooperation of several composers in the creation of the music. Wallace understood this and integrated leitmotiv-like elements from the individual songs into the film scores.

When the Disney studios began to increasingly produce full-length feature films, Wallace also wrote scores for these. In Darby O'Gill and the Little People (1959), Wallace wrote not only the score but also set the Lawrence Edward Watkin-penned popular songs "Pretty Irish Girl" and "The Wishing Song". In Toby Tyler, or Ten Weeks with a Circus (1959), he appeared as an actor, playing the conductor of the circus band.

Starting with Seal Island (1948), Wallace also specialized in musical accompaniments for Disney documentaries, including nearly all the films for the "People and Places" series and some of the True-Life Adventures. The music of White Wilderness (1958) was even nominated for an Oscar in 1959, a rare feat for a documentary film.

Overall, Wallace contributed music to almost over 150 Walt Disney productions. He worked for Disney studios for 27 years. He remained active in the studio in Los Angeles until shortly before his death at a Burbank, California hospital on September 15, 1963, at the age of 76. In 2008, he was posthumously honored with a Disney Legends award.

== Filmography ==
Most of the films were scored in collaboration with other composers.

=== Film scores ===
- 1934 – Girl in the Case – Music
- 1941 – Dumbo – Score and some songs
- 1943 – Victory Through Air Power – Score
- 1944 – The Three Caballeros – Score
- 1946 – Make Mine Music – Score
- 1947 – Fun and Fancy Free – Score
- 1948 – Seal Island – Score
- 1949 – The Adventures of Ichabod and Mr. Toad – Score
- 1950 – Cinderella – Score
- 1951 – Alice in Wonderland – Score and some songs
- 1953 – Peter Pan – Score and some songs
- 1954 – Siam – Score
- 1955 – Men Against the Arctic – Score
- 1955 – Lady and the Tramp – Score
- 1957 – Old Yeller – Score and song
- 1958 – White Wilderness – Score
- 1958 – Tonka – Score
- 1959 – Darby O'Gill and the Little People – Score and song
- 1960 – Jungle Cat – Score
- 1960 – Ten Who Dared – Score
- 1961 – Nikki, Wild Dog of the North – Score
- 1962 – Big Red – Score
- 1962 – The Legend of Lobo – Score
- 1963 – Savage Sam – Score
- 1963 – The Incredible Journey – Score (final film)

=== Animated Shorts ===
- 1937 – Mickey's Amateurs - Score
- 1937 – Modern Inventions - Score
- 1937 – Clock Cleaners - Score
- 1938 – Donald's Ostrich - Score
- 1938 – Self Control - Score
- 1938 – Boat Builders - Score
- 1938 – Donald's Better Self - Score
- 1938 – Donald's Nephews - Score
- 1938 – Mickey's Trailer - Score
- 1938 – Good Scouts - Score
- 1939 – Donald's Lucky Day - Score
- 1939 – Society Dog Show - Score
- 1939 – Mickey's Surprise Party - Score
- 1939 – Donald's Cousin Gus - Score
- 1939 – Sea Scouts - Score
- 1939 – Donald's Penguin - Score
- 1939 – The Autograph Hound - Score
- 1940 – The Riveter - Score
- 1940 – Tugboat Mickey - Score
- 1940 – Donald's Vacation - Score
- 1940 – Window Cleaners - Score
- 1940 – Mr. Mouse Takes a Trip - Score
- 1940 – Pantry Pirate - Score
- 1941 – Timber - Score
- 1941 – The Little Whirlwind - Score
- 1941 – Early to Bed - Score
- 1942 – Donald's Decision - Score
- 1942 – The New Spirit - Score
- 1942 – Symphony Hour - Score
- 1942 – Donald's Snow Fight - Score
- 1942 – Donald's Garden - Score
- 1942 – Donald's Gold Mine - Score
- 1942 – T-Bone for Two - Score
- 1942 – The Vanishing Private - Score
- 1942 – Pluto at the Zoo - Score
- 1942 – Bellboy Donald - Score
- 1943 – Der Fuehrer's Face – Score and title song
- 1943 – Education for Death - Score
- 1943 – Donald's Tire Trouble - Score
- 1943 – Pluto and the Armadillo - Score
- 1943 – Private Pluto - Score
- 1943 – Victory Vehicles - Score
- 1943 – Chicken Little - Score
- 1944 – Donald Duck and the Gorilla - Score
- 1944 – Contrary Condor - Score
- 1944 – Commando Duck - Score
- 1944 – How to Play Football - Score
- 1944 – Springtime for Pluto - Score
- 1944 – The Plastics Inventor - Score
- 1944 – First Aiders - Score
- 1944 – The Clock Watcher - Score
- 1945 – Dog Watch - Score
- 1945 – African Diary - Score
- 1945 – Canine Casanova - Score
- 1945 – Duck Pimples - Score
- 1945 – The Legend of Coyote Rock - Score
- 1945 – No Sail - Score
- 1945 – Cured Duck - Score
- 1945 – Canine Patrol - Score
- 1945 – Old Sequoia - Score
- 1946 – A Knight For a Day - Score
- 1946 – Pluto's Kid Brother - Score
- 1946 – In Dutch - Score
- 1946 – Squatter's Rights - Score
- 1946 – Donald's Double Trouble - Score
- 1946 – The Purloined Pup - Score
- 1946 – Wet Paint - Score
- 1946 – Dumb Bell of the Yukon - Score
- 1946 – Lighthouse Keeping - Score
- 1946 – Bath Day - Score
- 1946 – Frank Duck Brings 'Em Back Alive - Score
- 1946 – Double Dribble - Score
- 1947 – Pluto's Housewarming - Score
- 1947 – Rescue Dog - Score
- 1947 – Straight Shooters - Score
- 1947 – Sleepy Time Donald - Score
- 1947 – Figaro and Frankie - Score
- 1947 – Clown of the Jungle - Score
- 1947 – Donald's Dilemma - Score
- 1947 – Crazy with the Heat - Score
- 1947 – Bootle Beetle - Score
- 1947 – Wide Open Spaces - Score
- 1947 – Mickey's Delayed Date - Score
- 1947 – Foul Hunting - Score
- 1947 – Chip an' Dale - Score
- 1947 – Mail Dog - Score
- 1947 – Pluto's Blue Note- Score
- 1948 – They're Off - Score
- 1948 – The Big Wash - Score
- 1948 – Drip Dippy Donald - Score
- 1948 – Mickey Down Under - Score
- 1948 – Daddy Duck - Score
- 1948 – Bone Bandit - Score
- 1948 – Donald's Dream Voice - Score
- 1948 – Pluto's Purchase - Score
- 1948 – The Trial of Donald Duck - Score
- 1948 – Cat Nap Pluto - Score
- 1948 – Inferior Decorator - Score
- 1948 – Pluto's Fledgling - Score
- 1948 – Soup's On - Score
- 1948 – Three for Breakfast - Score
- 1948 – Mickey and the Seal - Score
- 1948 – Tea for Two Hundred - Score
- 1949 – Pueblo Pluto - Score
- 1949 – Donald's Happy Birthday - Score
- 1949 – Pluto's Surprise Package - Score
- 1949 – Sea Salts - Score
- 1949 – Pluto's Sweater - Score
- 1949 – Winter Storage - Score
- 1949 – Bubble Bee - Score
- 1949 – Honey Harvester - Score
- 1949 – Tennis Racquet - Score
- 1949 – All in a Nutshell - Score
- 1949 – Goofy Gymnastics - Score
- 1949 – The Greener Yard - Score
- 1949 – Sheep Dog - Score
- 1949 – Slide Donald Slide - Score
- 1950 – Pluto's Heart Throb - Score
- 1950 – Lion Around - Score
- 1950 – Pluto and the Gopher - Score
- 1950 – Crazy Over Daisy - Score
- 1950 – Wonder Dog - Score
- 1950 – Primitive Pluto - Score
- 1950 – Morris the Midget Moose - Score
- 1951 – Corn Chips - Score
- 1951 – Bee on Guard - Score
- 1952 – Teachers Are People - Score
- 1952 – Let's Stick Together - Score
- 1952 – Pluto's Party - Score
- 1952 – Two Weeks Vacation - Score
- 1953 – Rugged Bear - Score
- 1953 – Ben and Me – Score
- 1953 – Working for Peanuts - Score
- 1953 – Canvas Back Duck - Score
- 1954 – Spare the Rod - Score
- 1954 – The Lone Chipmunks - Score
- 1954 – Pigs Is Pigs - Score
- 1954 – Casey Bats Again - Score
- 1954 – Dragon Around - Score
- 1954 – Grin and Bear it - Score
- 1954 – Social Lion - Score
- 1954 – The Flying Squirrel - Score
- 1954 – Grand Canyonscope - Score
- 1955 – No Hunting - Score
- 1955 – Bearly Asleep - Score
- 1955 – Beezy Bear - Score
- 1955 – Up A Tree - Score
- 1956 – Chips Ahoy - Score
- 1956 – Hooked Bear - Score
- 1959 – How to Have an Accident at Work - Score

=== Actor ===
- Snow White and the Seven Dwarfs (1937) as Dopey and Sneezy (live-action reference)
- The Adventures of Ichabod and Mr. Toad (1949) as Mr. Winkie (voice, uncredited)/Ichabod Crane (whistling, uncredited)
- Toby Tyler, or Ten Weeks with a Circus (1960) – as the Bandleader (voice; credited as Ollie Wallace)
