= Donald's Penguin =

1939 Donald Duck cartoon

- Theatrical release poster
- Directed by: Jack King
- Story by: Carl Barks
- Produced by: Walt Disney
- Music by: Oliver Wallace
- Color process: Technicolor
- Production company: Walt Disney Productions
- Distributed by: RKO Radio Pictures
- Release date: August 11, 1939
- Running time: 7 minutes
- Language: English

Donald's Penguin is a Donald Duck animated Technicolor short film by Walt Disney Productions and directed by Jack King, which was originally released on August 11, 1939, by RKO Radio Pictures. The story was written by Carl Barks.

== Plot ==
Donald Duck adopts a cute and feisty baby penguin called Tootsie. Tootsie is a gift from the unseen character Admiral Bird. At first, surprised that his charge is a baby penguin, Donald grows fond of her, but when he mistakenly thought she ate his three goldfish, Donald becomes angry and spanks Tootsie. Only does he spot the mistake when the three fish emerge from their castle, looking just as angry as Tootsie. Hurt and cross over Donald's rashness, Tootsie isn't willing to forgive him, even when an embarrassed Donald takes off his hat and said "let bygones be bygones". To make amends for his mistake, He decides to feed Tootsie a catfish from the refrigerator, only to find that Tootsie is hiding inside the fish tank and eating the three goldfish. Enraged, Donald chases her through the house. During the chase, Tootsie eludes him by sliding under a chest and presumably putting a mousetrap underneath, which catches Donald's fingers. After Tootsie steals the catfish from him, Donald ultimately decides he has had enough of the penguin's shenanigans. The enraged duck corners her near the closet, pointing his double-barreled shotgun at the frightened Tootsie, threatening to kill her, but before he can deliver the coup de grace, his conscience and the sight of a scared and crying Tootsie reminds him why he shouldn't harm her. Full of remorse over what he was about to do, Donald settles down the gun and cries. As he laments, his gun falls down suddenly. An alarmed Donald tries to stop the gun from falling but is too late to prevent it from firing a hole in the wall, with Tootsie nowhere in sight. Horrified, Donald frantically looks for Tootsie through the pile of rubble. Suddenly, Tootsie reveals herself to be alive and well, having retreated to the closet in the nick of time. An overjoyed and relieved Donald hugs her. Tootsie forgives the teary-eyed duck by snuggling him before falling asleep in his arms. Donald then looks at the camera and smiles.

== Adaptation ==
While finishing developing the short, newspapers in portions of the United States introduced the "new" Tootsie character on April 15, 1939 listing as "oblivious" to Donald's feelings. The first few theaters would run the short a month later.

== Voice cast ==
- Clarence Nash as Donald Duck

== Home media ==
The short was released on May 18, 2004, on Walt Disney Treasures: The Chronological Donald, Volume One: 1934-1941.

== Sources ==
- Andrae, Tom (2006). Carl Barks and the Disney Comic Book: Unmasking the Myth of Modernity. University Press of Mississippi. ISBN 1-57806-858-4.
