= Self Control (film) =

1938 Donald Duck cartoon

- Title card
- Directed by: Jack King
- Story by: Carl Barks
- Produced by: Walt Disney
- Starring: Clarence Nash; Florence Gill
- Music by: Oliver Wallace
- Animation by: Jack Hannah; Paul Allen; Ed Aardal; Chuck Couch
- Color process: Technicolor
- Production company: Walt Disney Productions
- Distributed by: RKO Radio Pictures
- Release date: February 11, 1938
- Running time: 8:51
- Country: United States
- Language: English

Self Control is an animated short film in the Donald Duck series, produced in Technicolor by Walt Disney Productions and released to theaters on February 11, 1938, by RKO Radio Pictures. The film follows Donald Duck trying to learn to control his temper by following the advice of a radio program.

It was directed by Jack King and features the voice of Clarence Nash as Donald Duck and Florence Gill as the clucking voice of a chicken. The voice of Uncle Smiley was uncredited.

== Plot ==
Donald Duck is enjoying a leisurely day in his hammock sipping lemonade and listening to his radio. Soon Uncle Smiley's radio program comes on. Smiley is described as a "musical philosopher" and uses songs to maintain a positive attitude. Donald insists that he has never lost his temper.

However, Donald's temper is soon put to the test first by a fly that lands on his foot, followed by a caterpillar which crawls down the underside of his hammock and tickles him. A chicken comes along and pecks Donald's rear end while trying to grab the caterpillar. Finally, Donald fights with a woodpecker for bathing in his bowl of lemonade, who retaliates by causing a huge amount of apples to fall onto the hammock tearing it up before pecking Donald's hat into a riddled rag.

At the end of the film Donald loses his temper, listening to his radio for count up to 10, and smashes with a shotgun.

== Voice cast ==
- Donald Duck: Clarence Nash
- Hen: Florence Gill

== Home media ==
The short was released on May 18, 2004, on Walt Disney Treasures: The Chronological Donald, Volume One: 1934-1941.
