= J.B. Kaufman =

J.B. Kaufman is a film historian and author who specializes in Disney animation history and silent films. His books include The Fairest One of All, Pinocchio: The Making of the Disney Epic, and Walt Disney's Mickey Mouse. He is the consulting historian for The Walt Disney Family Museum, and has also written for the Library of Congress and Cartoon Research. Kaufman is currently working with Margaret Barnes on a biography of the latter's grandfather Clarence Nash, the original voice of Donald Duck.

== Bibliography ==
- Kaufman, J.B; Merritt, Russell (1993). Walt in Wonderland: The Silent Films of Walt Disney. Baltimore: Le Giornate del Cinema Muto, The Johns Hopkins University Press (ISBN 88-86155-02-6)
- Kaufman, J.B; Merritt, Russell (2006). Walt Disney's Silly Symphonies: A Companion to the Classic Cartoon Series. Gemona: La Cineteca del Friuli (ISBN 88-86155-27-1)
- Kaufman, J.B (2009). South of the Border with Disney: Walt Disney and the Good Neighbor Program. New York City: Disney Editions (ISBN 978-1423111931)
- Kaufman, J.B (2012). The Fairest One of All: The Making of Walt Disney's Snow White and the Seven Dwarfs. San Francisco: The Walt Disney Family Foundation Press, Weldon Owens (ISBN 978-1616284381)
- Kaufman, J.B (2015). Pinocchio: The Making of the Disney Epic. San Francisco: The Walt Disney Family Foundation Press, Weldon Owens (ISBN 978-1616288099)
- Kothenschulte, Daniel (ed.); Kaufman, J.B; Gerstein, David (2018). Walt Disney's Mickey Mouse: The Ultimate History. Cologne: Taschen (ISBN 978-3836552844)
- Kaufman, J.B (2019). The Making of Walt Disney's Fun and Fancy Free. Orcutt: Hyperion Historical Alliance Press (ISBN 978-0578527444)
