= John Reed (animator) =

American animator

John F. Reed
- Born: August 24, 1908; California, United States
- Died: September 29, 1992 (aged 84); San Diego, California, United States
- Occupation: Animator

John F. Reed (August 24, 1908 – September 29, 1992) was an American animator.

In the 1940s, Reed worked on major Disney productions such as Pinocchio, The Reluctant Dragon, and Bambi. As an assistant effects animator on Fantasia, he was responsible for making fine corrections to the motion of background elements such as fish and seaweed. He was a protegee of artist Hanson Puthuff.

His most notable credit was as animation director for the 1954 film Animal Farm. As one colleague described, "Reed's influence on the animation in Animal Farm was tremendous. He knew exactly the effect he wanted and how to get it."

== Filmography ==
- Pinocchio (1940) – animator
- Fantasia (1940) – animator, special animation effects
- The Reluctant Dragon (1941) – effects animator
- Bambi (1942) – animator
- The Grain That Built a Hemisphere (1943) - animator
- Contrary Condor (1944) – animator
- Donald's Off Day (1944) – animator
- The Three Caballeros (1944) – animator
- The Eyes Have It (1945) – animator
- No Sail (1945) – animator
- A Knight for a Day (1946) – animator
- Fun and Fancy Free (1947) – animator
- Animal Farm (1954) - animation director
