= Roy Williams Airport =

- IATA: none; ICAO: none; FAA LID: L80

Summary
- Airport type: Public
- Owner: Richardson Family Trust
- Serves: Joshua Tree, California
- Elevation AMSL: 2,464 ft (751 m)
- Coordinates: 34°09′15″N 116°15′08″W
- Interactive map of Roy Williams Airport

Runways
Direction	Length		Surface
Direction	ft	m	Surface
6/24	2,493	760	Asphalt
12/30	2,355	718	Asphalt/dirt

Statistics (2007)
- Aircraft operations: 6,200
- Based aircraft: 14
- Source: Federal Aviation Administration

Roy Williams Airport (FAA LID: L80) was a privately owned public-use airport located three nautical miles (6 km) northeast of the central business district of Joshua Tree, in San Bernardino County, California, United States.

The airport was named for Roy Williams, artist and entertainer for The Walt Disney Studios, best known as "Big Roy", the adult mouseketeer on The Mickey Mouse Club. Williams was also a pilot and the father-in-law of airport owner Park Richardson.

The Roy Williams Airport has been closed by the family of Park Richardson. Although difficult to see from the air, the paved runway has Xs painted.

The FAA LID L80 is now assigned to Monache Meadows Airport, Lone Pine, California, USA.

== Facilities and aircraft ==
Roy Williams Airport covers an area of 115 acres (47 ha) at an elevation of 2,464 feet (751 m) above mean sea level. It has two runways: 6/24 is 2,493 by 50 feet (760 x 15 m) with an asphalt surface; 12/30 is 2,355 by 100 feet (718 x 30 m) with an asphalt and dirt surface.

For the 12-month period ending August 17, 2007, the airport had 6,200 general aviation aircraft operations, an average of 16 per day. At that time there were 14 aircraft based at this airport: 79% single-engine and 21% ultralight.
