= Mr. Duck Steps Out =

1940 Donald Duck cartoon

- Theatrical release poster
- Directed by: Jack King
- Story by: Carl Barks; Chuck Couch; Jack Hannah; Harry Reeves; Milt Schaffer; Frank Tashlin
- Produced by: Walt Disney
- Starring: Clarence Nash
- Music by: Charles Wolcott
- Animation by: Les Clark; Larry Clemmons; Don Towsley; Lee Morehouse; Rex Cox; Volus Jones; Emery Hawkins; Ray Patin; Ken Muse; Dick Lundy; Eddie Strickland; Phil Duncan; Judge Whitaker; Jim Armstrong
- Layouts by: Bill Herwig
- Color process: Technicolor
- Production company: Walt Disney Productions
- Distributed by: RKO Radio Pictures
- Release date: June 7, 1940
- Running time: 8:12
- Country: United States
- Language: English

Mr. Duck Steps Out is a Donald Duck cartoon produced by Walt Disney Productions, which was released on June 7, 1940, and features the debut of Daisy Duck. The short was directed by Jack King and written by Carl Barks, Chuck Couch, Jack Hannah, Harry Reeves, Milt Schaffer, and Frank Tashlin.

Clarence Nash performs all the voices in the film—Donald, Daisy and Donald's nephews.

== Plot ==
Donald prepares to visit his new love interest, Daisy, for their first known date. Huey, Dewey, and Louie attempt to go too, but Donald, unwilling to allow this, tricks them into entering a closet and locks them in before heading to Daisy's house, but the nephews escape by sawing a hole in the wall and beat him there. After Donald unknowingly gives a box of chocolates (which are meant to Daisy) to the nephews, he realizes who he's talking to after hearing them thank him and chases them down, cornering them just as Daisy arrives. Being forced to act nicely, he claims that he brought his nephews along before quickly taking the chocolates back and in exchange, gives the nephews a coin and sends them to buy ice cream. They do so, rushing out of the house so fast that it causes the door to briefly slam shut. Now alone, Donald and Daisy sit on a couch. Donald tries to woo her and hug her, but at first Daisy acts shy and has her back turned to her visitor. Donald soon notices her tail feathers taking the form of a hand and signaling for him to come closer, but their time alone is soon interrupted by the nephews, who have just returned; they push Donald off the couch and he bumps into a radio, causing it to play music.

Donald and the nephews take turns dancing the jitterbug with her while trying to get rid of each other. One of the nephews, cleverly switches his ice cream for Daisy, but Donald soon takes notice and in a fit of rage, throws the ice cream on the floor, making it splatter in his face. He pulls the nephew aside and dances with Daisy again, but all three nephews then knock Donald aside, causing him to fall into a tiger skin rug, which Donald uses to fling the nephews into the kitchen. In their final effort, the three younger ducks find a maize and after heating it on the stove, knock it into Donald's mouth as it is in the process of becoming popcorn. The process is completed within Donald himself, who continues to move wildly around the house while maintaining the appearance of dancing. The nephews then bring things into the room to use as instruments: a trombone, plungers, a dummy, a candelabra, a frog-shaped flower holder, a piano, a horn, and many objects that are used as drums. After landing near a fireplace, the maize that's still in Donald's stomach makes him go out of control, resulting in Daisy being tangled in curtains, her and Donald spinning on a rug, followed by them crashing through a foldable wall. The camera then moves to show that they've crashed into a dish cabinet. The short ends with an impressed Daisy showering her new lover with red kisses.

== History ==
Mr. Duck Steps Out stands out among other Donald shorts of the period for its use of modern music and surreal situations throughout. After this short, the idea of a permanent love interest for Donald was well established, but Daisy did not appear as regularly as Donald himself.

Virginia Davis, who years earlier worked with Walt as the titular character in the Alice Comedies, served as the dance model for Daisy.

In later versions of this short, Daisy's lines were re-dubbed by June Foray.

== Releases ==
- 1940 - theatrical release
- 1961 - Walt Disney's Wonderful World of Color, episode #8.6: "Inside Donald Duck" (TV)
- 1977 - Donald and His Duckling Gang (theatrical)
- c. 1983 - Good Morning, Mickey!, episode #61 (TV)
- 1984 - "From Disney, With Love" (TV)
- c. 1992 - Mickey's Mouse Tracks, episode #31 (TV)
- c. 1992 - Donald's Quack Attack, episode #45 (TV)
- 1994 - "Love Tales" (VHS)
- 1997 - The Ink and Paint Club, episode #1.20: "Huey, Dewey & Louie" (TV)
- 1998 - The Ink and Paint Club, episode #1.40: "Crazy Over Daisy" (TV)

== Home media ==
The short has been re-released on home media multiple times since its first distribution. These releases include:

- 1984 - "Cartoon Classics - Limited Gold Edition: Daisy" (VHS)
- 1994 - "Love Tales" (VHS)
- 2004 - "Mickey and Minnie's Sweetheart Stories" (DVD)
- 2004 - "Walt Disney Treasures: The Chronological Donald, Volume One: 1934-1941" (DVD)
- 2006 - "Classic Cartoon Favorites: Best Pals - Donald and Daisy" (DVD)
- 2019 - Disney+ (streaming)

== Legacy ==
Daisy wears the same clothes from this short in the 2023 short film Once Upon a Studio.
