= Roy Williams (artist) =

American animator (1907–1976)

- Born: July 30, 1907; Colville, Washington, U.S.
- Died: November 7, 1976 (aged 69); Burbank, California, U.S.
- Occupations: Artist, entertainer, inventor
- Years active: 1930–1976

Roy Williams (July 30, 1907 – November 7, 1976) was an American artist and entertainer for The Walt Disney Studios, best known as "Big Roy", the adult mouseketeer for four seasons on the Mickey Mouse Club television series.

== Early life and career ==
Williams was born in Colville, Washington and raised in Los Angeles, where he attended Fremont High School. After graduating, he was hired as an artist by Walt Disney in 1930. He worked on animated shorts while attending Chouinard Art Institute at night. He later also developed story ideas for Disney. He also designed over 100 insignias for the U.S. armed forces during World War II, and is credited with designing the mouse ears worn on the Mickey Mouse Club, which would later be sold at Disney Parks.

Williams also produced one-panel gag cartoons for The New Yorker, The Saturday Evening Post, and other magazines.

Disney director Jack Kinney described Williams as a "big fat balding hot-headed unpredictable bastard", but hugely admired his prolific talent, saying that he could "sit down and grunt out a few pounds of gags as if it were nothing". The Mouseketeers who worked with him on the original Mickey Mouse Club series, conversely, remembered him fondly. Former Mouseketeer Lonnie Burr, appearing on Tom Snyder's Tomorrow show on NBC in 1975 to talk about the Mickey Mouse Club at the time of its 20th anniversary, called Williams "a warm guy, who liked kids, always had time for kids, and always helped us any way he could." According to Disney storyman Frank Tashlin, he and Williams would periodically throw Donald Duck voice actor Clarence Nash out of a window while he slept, for their amusement.

== Legacy ==
Williams died in Burbank, California on November 7, 1976, aged 69. He is interred at Forest Lawn Memorial Park in the Hollywood Hills of Los Angeles. He was posthumously inducted as a Disney Legend in 1992. The historic Roy Williams Airport on Sunfair Road in Joshua Tree, California is named after Williams. In 2015, the airport site was proposed to be converted to a solar farm.
