= Ernie Nordli =

American layout artist

Ernest Nordli (June 15, 1912 – April 22, 1968) was an American animation designer and layout artist, most notably for Walt Disney Studios.

== Biography ==
He was born in Salt Lake City, Utah to Norwegian immigrant Hans Magnus Nordli (1884-1975) and Hedvig Charlotte Esterblom (1888-1976) who was of Swedish heritage. He studied art at the Santa Barbara School of the Arts.

Nordli, nicknamed "Ernie", was a talented artist whose work had an appealing modern sensibility. He started at Disney in 1936 and served as an art director/layout artist on Dumbo and Fantasia, and worked on many of the studio's shorts through the mid-1940s, including such Donald Duck shorts as The Plastics Inventor and Donald's Double Trouble. He left Disney and in the 1950s became the layout artist for Chuck Jones, in the absence of Maurice Noble. He was the layout man on eight Jones shorts, including some memorable films like Broom-Stick Bunny and Rocket-bye Baby (both 1956). After his short stint with Jones, Nordli returned to Disney where he worked on Sleeping Beauty and One Hundred and One Dalmatians, on which he was a layout stylist. He played an important role in designing the background drawing style on Dalmatians.

Nordli continued working until his death. His later credits include The Alvin Show, Gay Purr-ee (1962), Hey There, It's Yogi Bear! (1964), The Man from Button Willow (1965) and the show Johnny Cypher in Dimension Zero. In the early-1950s, Nordli also designed many covers for Dell Comics including for issues featuring Lone Ranger, Cisco Kid and Red Ryder.

He died in 1968 at age 55 in San Francisco, California. Fellow layout artist Walt Peregoy stated the opinion that he may have committed suicide.
