= Clarence Nash =

American voice actor (1904–1985)

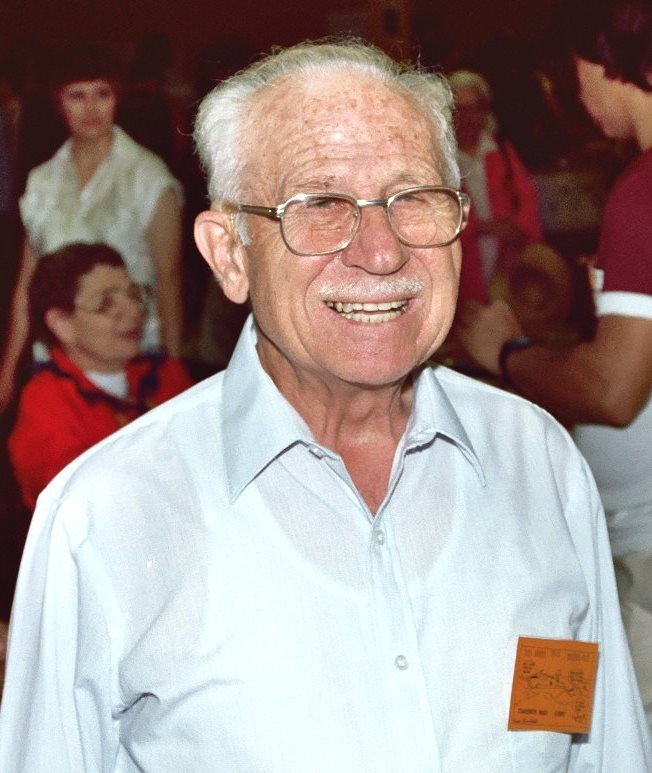
- Nash in 1982
- Born: Clarence Charles Nash; December 7, 1904; Watonga, Oklahoma Territory
- Died: February 20, 1985 (aged 80); Glendale, California, U.S.
- Resting place: San Fernando Mission Cemetery, Mission Hills, Los Angeles, California, U.S.
- Other name: Ducky Nash
- Occupations: Voice actor; impressionist
- Years active: 1928–1985
- Spouse: Margaret Seamans (m. 1930)
- Children: 2
- Awards: Inkpot Award (1978)

Clarence Charles "Ducky" Nash (December 7, 1904 – February 20, 1985) was an American voice actor and impressionist. He is best remembered as the original voice of the Disney cartoon character Donald Duck. He was born in the rural community of Watonga, Oklahoma, and a street in that town is named in his honor. In 1993, he was posthumously made a Disney Legend for his contributions to Walt Disney films.

== Career ==
=== Radio career ===
Nash made a name for himself in the late 1920s as an impressionist for KHJ, a Los Angeles radio station, on their show, The Merrymakers. He later was employed by the Adohr Milk Company for publicity purposes. Dubbed "Whistling Clarence, the Adohr Bird Man", Nash rode the streets with a team of miniature horses and gave treats to the children. In 1932, Nash happened by the Disney Studio with his team of horses, and decided to leave a copy of his Adohr publicity sheet with the receptionist. As it turns out, his name was recognized from a reprise appearance on The Merrymakers a few days previous, and Walt Disney had been impressed by Nash's vocal skills. He was asked to make an informal audition.

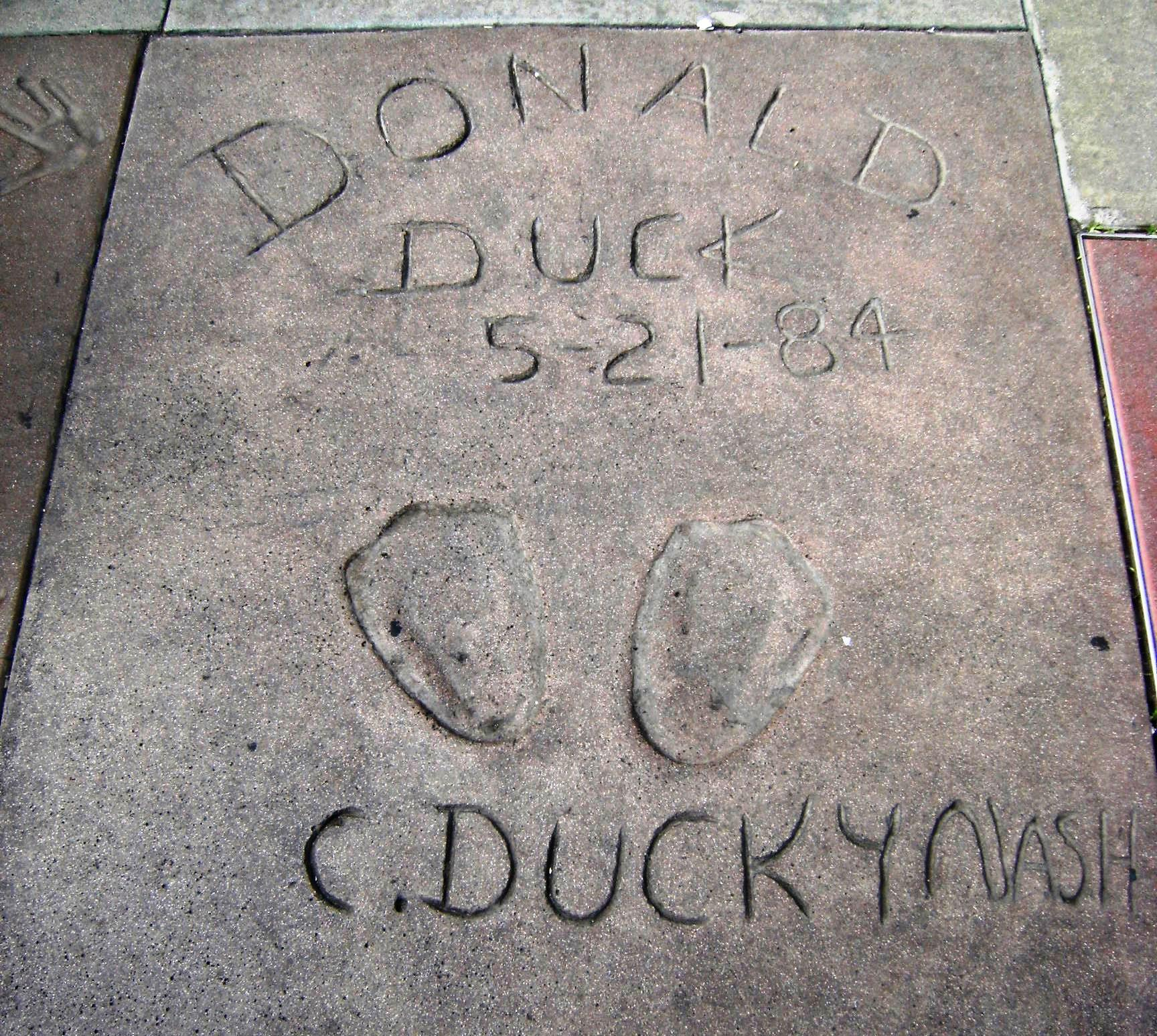
Nash left Donald's "footprints" at the Chinese Theatre in Hollywood.

=== Donald Duck ===
One source indicates Nash auditioned before a casting director for Walt Disney Studios and did a voice impression of a billy goat that Nash had started doing as a child in Watonga. The director then reached for the intercom and told Walt Disney, "I think we have found our duck." Another version indicates Nash went through several of his voices, and Walt Disney happened by when Nash gave his impersonation of a family of ducks. Disney declared Nash perfect for the role of a talking duck in their upcoming animated short, The Wise Little Hen. The duck was Donald Duck, who Nash went on to voice for 51 years, in over 120 shorts and films. The last film to feature Nash's famous voice was 1983's Mickey's Christmas Carol, although he continued to provide Donald's voice for commercials, promos, and other miscellaneous material until his death.

As early as 1938, promoters from lecture circuits were approaching him on his unique voice of Donald. Disney reportedly did not like the engagements at first, feeling that a human doing the voice would be spoiling the illusion, but then long after he had second thoughts. In early 1941, Nash was traveling on personal appearance tours sponsored by Disney. During World War II, Nash, with his ventriloquist puppet of Donald, which was built by Disney's character modeling department, became a regular performer at USO bond rallies and other events to support the war effort. In the mid-1940s, Roy and Walt approved the Donald puppet and they decided to harness it for the 1944 re-release of Snow White and the Seven Dwarfs. RKO and Disney were unsure how the film would do the second time around at the box office after its initial blockbuster run, so they did a promotional campaign with Disney characters including Nash performing with the Donald puppet. During the promotional period of Fun and Fancy Free, he did multiple radio appearances from May to September 1947, with one of those appearances starring Disney himself. He voiced Donald for 1950s TV commercials.

Nash's Donald Duck voice was achieved by what is called buccal speech: an alaryngeal form of vocalization which uses the inner cheek to produce sound rather than the larynx. He first discovered it while trying to mimic his pet goat Mary. In his days before Disney, Nash performed in vaudeville shows where he often spoke in a "nervous baby goat" voice.

Donald Duck became one of the world's most famous cartoon characters, in great part due to Nash's voice. The voice is distinctive both for its ducklike quality and the fact that it is often very difficult for anybody to understand, especially when Donald flew into a rage (which happened fairly often). To keep Donald's voice consistent throughout the world, Nash voiced the character in all foreign languages the Disney shorts were translated to (with the aid of the phonetic alphabet), meaning Donald retained his same level of incoherency all across the globe.

=== Other characters ===
In addition to Donald's voice, Clarence Nash also voiced Donald's nephews Huey, Dewey and Louie and his girlfriend Daisy in Mr. Duck Steps Out, and Mickey Mouse in The Dognapper. He provided the meows and yowls of Figaro the kitten and some donkey brays in Pinocchio and in a handful of shorts. He also did the whistling (Nash was a great whistler, hence his nickname "Whistling Clarence") of birds in Snow White and the Seven Dwarfs and Cinderella, voiced a bullfrog in Bambi and Mr. Bluebird in Song of the South, did some dog sounds in One Hundred and One Dalmatians and background bird sounds in Enchanted Tiki Room, and voiced Jiminy Cricket for a brief period of time after Cliff Edwards' death in 1971.

Nash's iconic Donald Duck voice would be impersonated elsewhere in animation, most notably in the Tom and Jerry cartoons directed by William Hanna and Joseph Barbera with the character Little Quacker (voiced by Red Coffey) and Hanna-Barbera's Yakky Doodle (voiced by Jimmy Weldon), while Harry E. Lang did Donald Duck-like voices in cartoons at MGM Cartoons and Columbia Pictures, including Tom Cat in the early shorts whenever he hisses. As with most Hanna-Barbera productions, these characters used celebrity impersonations, in these cases an impersonation of Clarence Nash's Donald Duck voice. Because both were much similar to Nash's voice they were often mistakenly attributed to Nash. Likewise, contrary to popular belief, he did not perform the duck voice for Rick Dees' "Disco Duck", which was done by one of Dees' acquaintances. Nash would also use his duck voice on The Burns & Allen Show during the 1940s, playing Gracie's pet duck Herman.

Nash appeared as himself in the 1941 film The Reluctant Dragon, which shows how Disney films were produced, and was a contestant on a 1954 episode of What's My Line and a 1964 episode of To Tell the Truth. He also made a brief appearance on That's My Line in 1980 on an episode where Mel Blanc was being interviewed. Nash also appeared as himself in a 1956 episode of Disneyland entitled "A Day in the Life of Donald Duck", in which he interacts with an animated Donald who blames him for his speech problems: the two end up arguing mainly due to Donald's short temper. He was also a guest on a 1976 episode of The Mike Douglas Show. The 1984 special Donald Duck's 50th Birthday included several clips from Disney films and Disneyland episodes.

=== Later years ===
When Disney shut down their shorts department in 1962, Nash continued to voice Donald in various projects over the next two decades. In 1971, he devoted himself to charity work, making personal visits to hospitals and homes and entertaining children with his Donald Duck voice.

One of Nash's final performances was in Mickey's Christmas Carol (1983), which made Donald the only character in the film to be voiced by his original actor. His career at Disney was the subject of the premiere episode of Disney Family Album, a 1984 series of documentaries about behind-the-scenes personalities at the studio.

== Personal life ==
Nash married Margaret Seamans in 1930, and they were married for over 50 years; they had two daughters, Kay and Peggy.

== Death ==
Nash died on February 20, 1985, of leukemia in the Providence Saint Joseph Medical Center in Burbank, California, at the age of 80 and was interred in the San Fernando Mission Cemetery in Mission Hills, Los Angeles, California. The tombstone of the grave he now shares with his wife Margaret Nash depicts a carving of Donald and Daisy Duck holding hands.

== Successor and upcoming biography ==
After Nash's death, Donald's voice has been taken up by Disney animator Tony Anselmo, who was trained under Nash personally. Anselmo is also among the many voiceover artists to have voiced Huey, Dewey and Louie over the years. Later characters whose voices owe considerable credit to Nash's duck voice have been voiced by actors such as Jimmy Weldon, Frank Welker, Luba Goy and Red Coffey. The most prominent of these is Weldon's Yakky Doodle for Hanna-Barbera.

It was announced in 2020 that Disney historian J.B. Kaufman was working on a biography of Nash with Margaret Barnes, Nash's granddaughter.

== Filmography ==
=== Radio ===
Year	Title	Role	Notes
1938	The Mickey Mouse Theater of the Air	Donald Duck	
1941–1943	The George Burns and Gracie Allen Show	Herman the Duck	
1945	Command Performance	Donald Duck	

=== Shorts ===
Year	Title	Role	Notes
1934	The Wise Little Hen	Donald Duck	(voice)
1934	The Flying Mouse	Bat	(voice)
1935	Pluto's Judgement Day	Kitten, Cat Judge, Cat Jury	(voice)
1936	Elmer Elephant	Joey Hippo	(voice)
1939	Donald's Penguin	Tootsie the Penguin	(voice)
1947	Mickey and the Beanstalk	Donald Duck	(voice)
1983	Mickey's Christmas Carol	Nephew Fred/Donald Duck	(voice)
2024	D.I.Y Duck	Donald Duck	(archived recording)

=== Film ===
Year	Title	Role	Notes
1940	Pinocchio	Figaro	(voice)
1941	The Reluctant Dragon	Himself, Donald Duck	(voice)
1942	Bambi	Bullfrog, Hunter Dogs	(voice)
1942	Saludos Amigos	Donald Duck	(voice)
1944	The Three Caballeros	Donald Duck	(voice)
1946	Song of the South	Mr. Bluebird	(voice)
1947	Fun and Fancy Free	Donald Duck, Cat	(voice)
1949	The Adventures of Ichabod and Mr. Toad	Ichabod's Horse, Cat	(voice)
1950	Cinderella	Birds	(voice)
1951	Alice in Wonderland	Dinah	(voice)
1961	One Hundred and One Dalmatians	Dogs	(voice)
1965	Donald Duck Goes West	Donald Duck	(voice)

=== Television ===
Year	Title	Role	Notes
1954–1985	Walt Disney's Wonderful World of Color	Donald Duck/Himself	Voice & live-action
1954	What's My Line?	Himself (Voice of Donald Duck)	Live appearance
1963	To Tell the Truth	Himself-Challenger	Live appearance
1984	Donald Duck's 50th Birthday	Himself/Donald Duck	Live-action & voice Final role

== Discography ==
- Mickey and the Beanstalk (Capitol, 1947) as Donald Duck
- Donald Duck's Singing Lesson/Pluto, The Pup (Golden, 1949) as Donald Duck
- Cinderella (RCA, 1949) as Lucifer, Bruno, Major, Additional Animal Voices
- Mickey's New Car/Donald Duck at the Opera (Golden, 1950) as Donald Duck
- Donald Duck, Babysitter/Mickey Mouse and Farmer Rush Rush (Golden, 1950) as Donald Duck
- Donald Duck Cowboy (Golden, 1950) as Donald Duck
- Trick or Treat (RCA Victor, 1952) as Donald Duck
- Mr. Television (RCA Victor, 1952) as Donald Duck
- Mr. Animated Cartoon (RCA Victor, 1952) as Donald Duck
- Donald Duck, Fire Chief (Golden, 1953) as Donald Duck
- Mickey Mouse's Birthday Party (Capitol, 1954) as Donald Duck
- School Days (Golden, 1954) as Donald Duck
- Mickey Mouse's Christmas Party (Golden, 1954) as Donald Duck
- Happy Birthday to Mickey Mouse/Donald Duck's Unbirthday (Golden, 1955) as Donald Duck
- Walt Disney's Song Parade from Disneyland (Golden, 1956) as Donald Duck
- Goofy's Dance Party (Disneyland, 1959) as Donald Duck
- Donald Duck and His Friends (Disneyland, 1960) as Donald Duck
- Chipmunk Fun (Disneyland, 1963) as Donald Duck
- Mickey and the Beanstalk (Disneyland, 1963) as Donald Duck
- Dickens' Christmas Carol Presented by the Walt Disney Players (Disneyland, 1975) as Donald Duck
- Yankee Doodle Mickey (Disneyland, 1980) as Donald Duck
- Goin' Quackers (Disneyland, 1980) as Donald Duck
- Pardners (Disneyland, 1980) as Donald Duck
- Merry Christmas Carols (Disneyland, 1980) as Donald Duck
- Mousercise (Disneyland, 1982) as Donald Duck
- Mickey Mouse Splashdance (Disneyland, 1983) as Donald Duck

== See also ==
- Donald Duck talk

Preceded by None	Voice of Donald Duck; 1934–1985	Succeeded by Tony Anselmo
