= List of House of Mouse episodes =

The following is a list of episodes of House of Mouse, an American animated television series that ran on ABC from January 13, 2001 to May 18, 2002 and on Toon Disney from September 2, 2002 to October 24, 2003.

== Series overview ==
Season	Episodes	Originally released		
Season	Episodes	First released	Last released	Network
1	13	January 13, 2001	April 14, 2001	ABC
2	13	September 22, 2001	May 18, 2002	ABC
Films	2	November 6, 2001	September 3, 2002	Direct-to-video
3	26	September 2, 2002	October 24, 2003	Toon Disney

== Episodes ==
All episodes, excluding the cartoons, were directed by Tony Craig & Roberts Gannaway.

=== Season 1 (2001) ===
No. overall	No. in season	Title	Written by	Storyboard by	Original release date	Prod. code
1	1	"The Stolen Cartoons"	Kevin D. Campbell, Henry Gilroy and Thomas Hart	Sean Bishop, Rossen Varbanov, Todd Kurosawa, Edward Baker, Robert McKnight, Thomas Bernardo and Monika Tomova	January 13, 2001	4356-800
In an attempt to shut down the House of Mouse, Pete steals all the cartoons, and cannot be found guilty even with obvious clues pointing to him. Meanwhile, Donald is put in charge of the club after Mickey and Goofy leave to film a new cartoon. Despite managing to keep the show going, Pete points out that with only one cartoon, guests would get bored and eventually stop coming. His movements cause all the missing cartoons to come out of his coat, exposing his dirty trick and having him thrown out. Cartoons: Pluto Gets the Paper: Wet Cement (2001), Donald's Dynamite: Magic Act (2000), Hickory Dickory Mickey (2001)
2	2	"Big Bad Wolf Daddy"	Kevin D. Campbell, Henry Gilroy and Thomas Hart	William Austin, Rossen Varbanov, Robert McKnight, Edward Baker, Robert Griggs, Nicole Lang, Larry Scholl, Cynthia Petrovic and Todd Kurosawa	January 27, 2001	4356-802
Donald hires the Big Bad Wolf to perform a show at the club (mainly so Daisy could get his autograph). Mickey does not like the idea since the Wolf damaged the club the last time he performed. When Ludwig von Drake informs the gang that doors are the reason for the Wolf's behavior, they quickly remove all doors in the building. The performance goes well, but as Big Bad Wolf gets ready to leave, he orders the pigs back in their case, citing his "Play or Filet" contract with them. The pigs angrily comply, but accidentally snap the rope that was holding the doors above them. The doors fall on Donald, forming a house, causing the Wolf the blow the house in. Cartoons: Donald's Charmed Date (2001), Pluto Gets the Paper: Mortimer (2000), How to Be Groovy, Cool, and Fly (2001)
3	3	"The Three Caballeros"	Henry Gilroy	Larry Scholl, Sean Bishop, Paul Fisher, Thomas Bernardo, Rossen Varbanov and Lyndon Ruddy	February 3, 2001	4356-803
The Three Caballeros are scheduled to perform at the club, but no one remembers that Donald was the third Caballero, except Pumbaa. Determined to not be forgotten, he tries to be the most important performer of the group, re-naming himself "The Duck Formerly Known as Donald" (a parody of Prince). However, everyone wants the old Donald back, making Jose and Panchito harass and embarrass Donald during their song. Cartoons: Donald's Fish Fry (2000), How to Be Smart (2001)
4	4	"Goofy's Valentine Date"	Thomas Hart	Phillip Mosness, Rossen Varbanov, Edward Baker, Thomas Bernardo and Robert Griffith	February 10, 2001	4356-811
It is Valentine's Day, but Goofy is heartbroken that he does not have a date. Minnie and Daisy, who feel sorry for Goofy, set up a blind date for him; they later learn that Clarabelle Cow is his true love. Cartoons: Donald's Valentine Dollar (1999), Mickey to the Rescue: Staircase (1999), Pluto's Arrow Error (1999)
5	5	"Timon and Pumbaa"	Tracy Berna	Edward Baker, Daniel Jippes, Carlos Baeza, Thomas Bernardo, Rossen Varbanov and Lyndon Ruddy	February 17, 2001	4356-805
Timon and Pumbaa are set to perform, but due to a disagreement on what to do for their act, their friendship ends. Now it is up to Mickey and Donald to bring them back together. Cartoons: Pluto's Magic Paws (2000), Mickey to the Rescue: Cage and Cannons (1999), Golf Nut Donald (2001)
6	6	"Jiminy Cricket"	Tracy Berna	Chong Suk Lee, Sean Bishop and Thomas Bernardo	February 24, 2001	4356-809
Jiminy Cricket quits his job as Pinocchio's conscience after the jealous Pain and Panic separate Pinocchio from Jiminy. When Mickey says that he will do anything to help, the Blue Fairy makes Jiminy his conscience, much to Mickey's annoyance. It becomes obvious that Jiminy is making Mickey like Pinocchio when he makes him dress like the puppet and even Mickey's nose grows when he lies. Mickey quickly realizes that Pinocchio and Jiminy must stay together and has to figure out how to do it, mostly because Jiminy is ruining his image. Cartoons: Mickey's Mistake (1999), Daisy's Road Trip (1999)
7	7	"Unplugged Club"	Kevin D. Campbell, Henry Gilroy and Thomas Hart	Cynthia Petrovic, Robert McKnight, Rossen Varbanov and Thomas Bernardo	March 3, 2001	4356-801
Pete attempts to stop the show again by removing the electrical battery and turning off all the club's electricity. Luckily, Mickey and Minnie turn it back on again with Zeus' lightning bolt. Cartoons: Music Store Donald (2001), Mickey's Cabin (2000)
8	8	"Gone Goofy"	Thomas Hart	Paul Fisher, Carlos Baeza, Cynthia Petrovic, Debra Pugh, Thomas Bernardo and Kurt Anderson	March 10, 2001	4356-806
Donald tries to get Goofy fired from his job as head waiter after the club's budget causes problems. Cartoons: Pit Crew (2001), Goofy's Extreme Sports: Shark Feeding (2000), Donald's Goofy World (2001)
9	9	"Rent Day"	Henry Gilroy	Sean Bishop, Rossen Varbanov, Gary Graham, Cynthia Petrovic, Kurt Anderson, Robert McKnight and Thomas Bernardo	March 17, 2001	4356-808
Before the show ends, Mickey needs to pay the rent for Pete after he unwittingly spends the money on cheese. To keep Pete busy, Mickey gives him the royal treatment until Minnie reveals she foresaw Mickey making a blunder like using the rent money on cheese and gives up saved money she kept in case of an emergency like this. Cartoons: Mickey's Mountain (2000), Maestro Minnie: Circus Symphony (2001), Big House Mickey (2001)
10	10	"Donald's Lamp Trade"	Kevin D. Campbell	Daniel Jippes, Robert McKnight, Larry Scholl and Thomas Bernardo	March 24, 2001	4356-812
Taking advantage of Donald's jealousy towards Mickey, Jafar offers to make his dream of being the club's owner come true in exchange for "the lamp." However, it is not the lamp from the Cave of Wonders that he wants; it is a decorative one Mickey keeps in his dressing room. When Mickey learns of this, he willingly gives the lamp to Jafar and consoles Donald. Cartoons: Survival of the Woodchucks (2000), Goofy's Radio (2000)
11	11	"Donald's Pumbaa Prank"	Henry Gilroy	Alan Zegler, Paul Fisher, Kurt Anderson, Sean Bishop and Cynthia Petrovic	March 31, 2001	4356-813
It is April Fool's Day, and after Mickey plays a friendly prank on Donald, Pete takes advantage of Donald and convinces him to play a nasty prank involving Pumbaa that could shut down the club for good. Cartoons: Mickey's April Fools (2001), Whitewater Donald (2000)
12	12	"Thanks to Minnie"	Tracy Berna	Robert McKnight, Carlos Baeza, Chong Suk Lee, Thomas Bernardo, Jerry Eisenberg, Kurt Anderson and Todd Kurosawa	April 7, 2001	4356-814
Minnie feels that she is not appreciated at the House of Mouse after Clarabelle starts a rumor, so she quits her job, making the rest of the staff realize how much she means to them. Cartoons: Minnie Visits Daisy (2000), Mickey's Big Break (2000)
13	13	"Pluto Saves the Day"	Henry Gilroy	Robert McKnight, Paul Fisher, Thomas Bernardo, Ginny Suess and Garrett Ho	April 14, 2001	4356-815
In an attempt to shut down the club, Pete buys magic sleeping apples from the Evil Queen/Old Peddler Woman, successfully putting everyone but Pluto to sleep. Thus, Pluto attempts to keep the show going, Dodger and the Pet Shop Dogs (Jock, Patch, Rolly, Napoleon, Lafayette, Tito, Francis, and DeSoto) singing "Everybody Wants to Be a Woof", and after managing to do so, he kisses everyone and wakes them up, foiling Pete's plans to shut down the club once again. Cartoons: Goofy's Big Kitty (1999), Pluto's Kittens (1999)

=== Season 2 (2001–02) ===
No. overall	No. in season	Title	Written by	Storyboard by	Original release date	Prod. code
14	1	"Daisy's Debut"	Thomas Hart	Sean Bishop, Rossen Varbanov, Robert McKnight, Carlos Baeza, Kurt Anderson & Thomas Bernardo	September 22, 2001	4356-818
Daisy is given a chance to perform a duet with Mickey at the club, which makes Minnie feel left out. Realizing this, Daisy fakes injuring herself, to give Minnie her role in the duet (despite the lyrics saying the difference between a mouse and duck). Cartoons: Daisy's Big Sale (2001), Topsy Turvy Town (1999)
15	2	"Goofy for a Day"	Thomas Hart	Chong Suk Lee, Edward Baker, Mark Zoeller, Kurt Anderson, Garrett Ho, Lyndon Ruddy & Paul Fisher	September 29, 2001	4356-828
Max thinks that Goofy's job is not as important as Mickey and Donald's, so Goofy challenges Max to be a waiter. Cartoons: How to Be a Waiter (1999), Maestro Minnie: Hungarian Rhapsody No. 6 (1999), Donald's Dinner Date (1999)
16	3	"Clarabelle's Big Secret"	Tracy Berna	Thomas Bernardo, Chong Suk Lee, Robert McKnight & Kurt Anderson	October 6, 2001	4356-831
When everyone is tired of Clarabelle's old gossip, she announces that at the end of the show, she will reveal a big secret about somebody. Now, everyone in the club is convinced that she knows something hidden about them which they accidentally reveal to her. In the end, she reveals the secret is that she is quitting gossip; she eagerly returns at everyone's insistence, ready to reveal all they have told her. Cartoons: How to Be a Spy (1999), Double Date Don (2001)
17	4	"The Mouse Who Came to Dinner"	Henry Gilroy	Cynthia Petrovic, Paul Fisher, Robert McKnight, Garrett Ho, Kurt Anderson & Rossen Varbanov	October 13, 2001	4356-830
The gang tries to please Mortimer Mouse after they mistake him for a very important restaurant critic when it is really Lumiere. Cartoons: Mickey's Mix Up (2000), Maestro Minnie: Flight of the Bumble Bee (1999), Donald's Grizzly Guest (1999)
18	5	"Max's New Car"	Henry Gilroy	Rossen Varbanov, Alan Zegler, Phillip Mosness & Kurt Anderson	October 20, 2001	4356-825
Max wants to get a car, but Goofy feels that he is not ready for one yet. A living car from one of the cartoons shown at the club arrives and Max, curious that it has no driver, gets in only to be taken as a guinea pig and driven around against his will. When the car crashes itself into the club, Goofy assumes the worst and forbids Max from having a car. Feeling sorry for Max, Mickey and the others let him host and show a cartoon of Goofy being a reckless driver. Convinced he was too harsh with Max, Goofy relents and buys a used car for him and gets him his own parking space. Cartoons: Mickey's New Car (1999), Car Washers (2000), Motor Mania (1950) (clip)
19	6	"Not So Goofy"	Phil Walsh	Eddy Houchins, Edward Baker, Chong Suk Lee, Todd Kurosawa & Sean Bishop	November 10, 2001	4356-819
The gang is tired of Goofy's clumsiness and try to teach him to be more graceful, but quickly miss the old Goofy. Cartoons: Roller Coaster Painters (1999), Goofy's Extreme Sports: Wakeboarding (1999), How to Wash Dishes (2000)
20	7	"Everybody Loves Mickey"	Tracy Berna	Thomas Bernardo, Bob Kline, Cynthia Petrovic, Sean Bishop, Eddy Houchins, Kurt Anderson, Chong Suk Lee & Ed Baker	November 17, 2001	4356-824
Donald is tired of all the love and respect Mickey receives especially his three nephews, so he temporarily forms an alliance with Mortimer. Cartoons: Mickey's Rival Returns (2000), Mickey to the Rescue: Train Tracks (1999), Donald's Failed Fourth (1999)
21	8	"Max's Embarrassing Date"	Tracy Berna	Larry Scholl, Rossen Varbanov, Garrett Ho, Phillip Mosness, Chong Suk Lee & Virginia Suess	January 19, 2002	4356-829
Max has a date with Roxanne at the House of Mouse. At Max's request, everyone tries their best to keep Goofy away as he is a constant source of embarrassment to him. However, they all equally try too hard to make Max's date go well. In the end, Goofy is the one who sets things straight. Cartoons: Pluto's Penthouse Sweet (1999), How to Ride a Bike (1999)
22	9	"Where's Minnie?"	Phil Walsh	Thomas Bernardo, Jason So, Alan Zegler & Garrett Ho	January 26, 2002	4356-845
Minnie goes down to the prop basement to find Mickey a birthday present, but after realizing that she did not take Pluto, Mickey thinks that she is lost and takes Pluto, Goofy and Donald with him to find her. This leaves Daisy in charge, which leads to disastrous results. Cartoons: Mickey and the Color Caper (2002), Donald's Pool (2000)
23	10	"Super Goof"	Thomas Hart & Kevin D. Campbell	Daniel Jippes, Tom Ellery, Alan Zegler, Garrett Ho, Carlos Baeza, Holly Forsyth, Kirk Hanson, Robert McKnight, Mark Zoeller & Rossen Varbanov	February 2, 2002	4356-842
After eating some contaminated peanuts, Goofy becomes a superhero named "Super Goof". Now, he must save the club from an oncoming meteor. Cartoons: How to Take Care of Your Yard (2000), Locksmiths (2000)
24	11	"King Larry Swings In"	Phil Walsh	Cynthia Petrovic, Larry Scholl, Kurt Anderson, Paul Fisher & Thomas Bernardo	February 16, 2002	4356-823
King Louie's brother, King Larry, guest stars at the House of Mouse, but ends up making a mess of things. They quickly teach him manners. Note: This was the first episode to show a full classic theatrical cartoon (from the '30s, '40s, and '50s). Cartoons: Mickey and the Seal (1948), Goofy's Extreme Sports: Paracycling (1998), How to Be a Gentleman (2000)
25	12	"Ladies' Night"	Tracy Berna	Chong Suk Lee, Bob McKnight, Garrett Ho, Rossen Varbanov & Todd Kurosawa	February 23, 2002	4356-841
It is Ladies' Night, and Minnie, Daisy and Clarabelle are in charge of the club while Mickey, Donald and Goofy go bowling. Obsessed with being a part of the show, Mortimer tries to ruin it by telling the boys that the club is in trouble. Cartoons: Purple Pluto (1999), Daisy Bothers Minnie (1999), Maestro Minnie: William Tell Overture (1999)
26	13	"Dennis the Duck"	Thomas Hart	Larry Scholl, Robert McKnight, Sean Bishop, Garrett Ho, Jeroen Verschoor, Rossen Varbanov, Todd Kurosawa & Kirk Hanson	May 18, 2002	4356-840
It is Black and White Day at the House of Mouse, and the club is packed with old black and white cartoon characters. One of them, Dennis the Duck, tries to win over Donald, who is annoyed by him at first. However, they bond by tossing sandwiches at Daisy's face. Cartoons: The Whoopee Party (1932), Pioneer Days (1930) (clip), Mickey and the Goat Man (2002)

=== Season 3 (2002–03) ===
The first 18 episodes of this season aired along with an all-night House of Mouse marathon, airing on Toon Disney in September 2002 under the title "Night of 1,000 Toons".

No. overall	No. in season	Title	Written by	Storyboard by	Original release date	Prod. code
27	1	"Suddenly Hades"	Thomas Hart	Robert McKnight, Cynthia Petrovic, Garrett Ho, Alan Zegler, Rossen Varbanov, Carlos Baeza & Thomas Bernardo	September 2, 2002	4356-854
Pete breaks the club's air-conditioner on a very hot day and the only guest left is Hades. Now, Mickey and the gang must stop Pete from driving Hades away and shutting down the club. Though Pete succeeds in driving away Hades by flooding the club, it has become habitable to Ariel, Sebastian and Flounder, Pete is driven away before he can try again. Cartoons: Donald's Pool (2000), Donald's Lighthouse (2000)
28	2	"Pete's One-Man Show"	Kevin D. Campbell	Rossen Varbanov, Edward Baker, William Austin & Robert McKnight	September 2, 2002	4356-832
Pete agrees to be nice if Mickey lets him perform, but nobody comes to see him. Now, they have to convince Pete that he is performing for a full house in order to keep him from shutting down the club. Cartoons: Pinball Mickey (2002), Von Drake's House of Genius: Time Reverser (1999), Housesitters (2002)
29	3	"House of Crime"	Tracy Berna	Rossen Varbanov, Robert McKnight, Daniel Jippes, Thomas Bernardo, Robert Griffith, Garrett Ho, Todd Kurosawa & Monika Tomova	September 2, 2002	4356-836
A string of unexplained thefts and disappearances occur at the club. Mickey, with the help of Ludwig Von Drake, must discover the cause of the disappearance, who is ultimately revealed to be the Phantom Blot. Cartoons: Mickey Foils the Phantom Blot (1999), Von Drake's House of Genius: Teledinger (1999)
30	4	"Mickey and Minnie's Big Vacation"	Tracy Berna	Paul Fisher, Cynthia Petrovic, Rossen Varbanov, Thomas Bernardo, Roy Meurin, Stark Howell, Robert Onorato & Ken Kinoshita	September 2, 2002	4356-835
Mickey and Minnie try to leave for a vacation and leave Donald and Daisy in charge of the club. Cartoons: Around the World in 80 Days (1999), Donald's Dynamite: Fishing (1999)
31	5	"Donald and the Aracuan Bird"	Henry Gilroy	Thomas Bernardo, Sean Bishop, Phillip Mosness & Garrett Ho	September 2, 2002	4356-838
The Aracuan bird visits the House of Mouse as the special guest of the evening. Donald remembers him from past cartoons and is not too happy about it, especially when the chaos caused by the bird is attributed to Donald. Cartoons: Pluto vs. the Watchdog (1999), Bird Brained Donald (2000)
32	6	"Goofy's Menu Magic"	Tracy Berna	Edward Baker, Chong Suk Lee, Paul Fisher, Daniel Jippes, Garrett Ho, Todd Kurosawa, Cynthia Petrovic & Kirk Hanson	September 2, 2002	4356-846
Goofy takes over for Gus Goose as the club's head chef for one night, but is a total disaster until the Fairy Godmother accidentally leaves her wand with the dishes. Goofy uses its magic to make his meals taste delicious, though Mickey is determined to uncover the truth. Cartoons: Sandwich Makers (1999), Mickey Tries to Cook (1999), Pluto Gets the Paper: Bubble Gum (1999)
33	7	"Music Day"	Phil Walsh	Phillip Mosness, Larry Scholl, Jennifer Lerew, Todd Kurosawa, Garrett Ho & Rossen Varbanov	September 2, 2002	4356-847
The Quackstreet Boys (alias Huey, Dewey, and Louie) have broken up and Mickey, Donald, and Goofy have to reunite them in time for the show, even resorting to impersonating them and playing music terribly. Cartoons: Symphony Hour (1942) (clip), How to Be a Rock Star (2002), Goofy's Extreme Sports: Skating the Half Pipe (1998), Donald's Rocket Ruckus (1999) Note: This was the last episode to show only a clip of a cartoon.
34	8	"House of Scrooge"	Thomas Hart	Sean Bishop, Robert McKnight, Garrett Ho, Thomas Bernardo & Rossen Varbanov	September 2, 2002	4356-849
Scrooge McDuck buys the House of Mouse. Realizing that they spend too much money, he increases the prices on everything and slashes all of the club's budgets. Eventually, when the guests are driven away by the gang out-Scrooging Scrooge, the old duck takes back all the money from Pete that he used to pay for the club and things return to normal. Cartoons: A Midsummer Night's Dream (1999), Von Drake's House of Genius: Money Increaser (1999)
35	9	"Donald Wants to Fly"	Henry Gilroy	Rossen Varbanov, Gavin Dell, Kirk Hanson, Thomas Ellery & Garrett Ho	September 2, 2002	4356-852
The theme of the day is flight, but Donald cannot fly, even though he wants to. Various characters, including Dumbo and Timothy Mouse, the Notre Dame Gargoyles, and Scuttle, try to help, but nothing works until Peter Pan arrives. Cartoons: Mickey's Airplane Kit (1999), Mickey and the Seagull (2000)
36	10	"Dining Goofy"	Kevin D. Campbell	Alan Zegler, Edward Baker, Jason So, Rossen Varbanov & Garrett Ho	September 2, 2002	4356-858
When touchscreen computers and headset-wearing penguins start taking over his duties, Goofy attempts to help the other staff members out, which ends in disastrous failures. Cartoons: Answering Service (2000), Von Drake's House of Genius: Remote Controlled Laser Lawnmower (1999), Computer.don (2000)
37	11	"Chip 'n' Dale"	Tracy Berna	Kirk Tingblad, Paul Fisher, Rossen Varbanov & Garrett Ho	September 2, 2002	4356-861
Chip and Dale try to steal all the nuts in the club, and when Donald tries to stop them, Mickey and Goofy blame him for the theft. Chip and Dale finally trick Donald into flooding the club with the stolen nuts, which Mickey and Goofy think it was Donald's idea of a tribute to Chip and Dale. Cartoons: Up a Tree (1955), Goofy's Extreme Sports: Rock Climbing (1999), Two Chips and a Miss (1952)
38	12	"Humphrey in the House"	Steve Roberts	Thomas Bernardo, Garrett Ho & Rossen Varbanov	September 2, 2002	4356-859
Ranger J. Audubon Woodlore and the Brownstone Park Bears are hired as the club's janitors when the Magic Brooms go on vacation. However, Humphrey is more interested in the cuisine than work, leading to trouble. Cartoons: Hot Tub Humphrey (2002), Beezy Bear (1955)
39	13	"Ask Von Drake"	Elizabeth Stonecipher	Ed Baker & Garrett Ho	September 2, 2002	4356-851
Mickey tries to prove Ludwig Von Drake wrong after he states that he knows everything. It turns out true; Von Drake forgot to count himself as one of the guests when singing about who was there. Cartoons: Hydrosquirter (1999), Relaxing with Von Drake (1999)
40	14	"Salute to Sports"	Tracy Berna & Thomas Hart	Eddy Houchins, Paul Fisher, Thomas Bernardo & Kurt Anderson	September 2, 2002	4356-821
Donald tries to prove that he is a good sport by not losing his temper. Meanwhile, Goofy tries to sing the National Anthem, but keeps getting it wrong. Cartoons: How to Be a Baseball Fan (2000), Goofy Gymnastics (1949)
41	15	"Pluto vs. Figaro"	Jan Strnad	Cynthia Petrovic, Larry Scholl, Garrett Ho, Sean Bishop & Thomas Bernardo	September 2, 2002	4356-850
Minnie thinks that Pluto is overworked and hires Figaro to help him, but he only causes more trouble for Pluto. Cartoons: Pluto Runs Away (1999), Donald and the Big Nut (1999), Pluto Gets the Paper: Street Cleaner (1999)
42	16	"House of Magic"	Thomas Hart	Rossen Varbanov, Robert McKnight, Garrett Ho & Lyndon Ruddy	September 2, 2002	4356-843
Daisy convinces Mickey to let her perform a magic act in the show, but makes the audience (and later the club, minus the screen) disappear. When Jafar arrives, Mickey strikes a bargain to return everything Daisy vanished in exchange for "Agrabah". Mickey keeps his word and gives him a snowglobe with Agrabah in it as Jafar's reward. Cartoons: Presto Pluto (2000), Donald's Dynamite: Bowling (1999), Babysitters (2002)
43	17	"Mickey vs. Shelby"	Thomas Hart	Mark Zoeller, Thomas Bernardo, Edward Baker, Garrett Ho & Kirk Hanson	September 2, 2002	4356-857
Mrs. Turtle wants her baby son Shelby (who has given Donald plenty of trouble in the past) to perform, and Mickey agrees to babysit him. However, because he always wants to give constant headaches to those who are not his mother, Shelby drives Mickey insane and nearly gets him in trouble. Cartoons: Donald's Shell Shots (1999), Domesticated Donald (2000)
44	18	"House of Turkey"	Henry Gilroy	Carlos Baeza, Sean Bishop, Robert McKnight, William Austin, Paul Fisher, Thomas Bernardo & Kurt Anderson	September 2, 2002	4356-820
Everyone looks forward to the Turkey coming to the club on Thanksgiving, but not just for his performance. Cartoons: Turkey Catchers (1999), Mickey's Mixed Nuts (2000)
45	19	"Clarabelle's Christmas List"	Tracy Berna	Jason So, Rossen Varbanov, Sean Bishop, Garrett Ho & Thomas Bernardo	December 2, 2002	4356-862
Clarabelle claims to have Santa Claus's Naughty or Nice list, and adds anyone who tries to sneak a peek at it to the Naughty list. Cartoons: Donald on Ice (1999), Mickey's Christmas Crisis (2000)
46	20	"Pete's Christmas Caper"	Thomas Hart	Thomas Bernardo, Cynthia Petrovic, Paul Fisher, Robert Griffith, Phillip Mosness, Sean Bishop, Robert Renzetti, Kurt Anderson & Eddy Houchins	December 2, 2002	4356-827
Pete tries to steal everyone's presents when he volunteers to play Santa Claus at the staff's Christmas party. Cartoons: The Nutcracker (1999), Donald's Dynamite: Snowman (1999)
47	21	"Snow Day"	Phil Walsh	Chong Suk Lee, Phillip Mosness, Edward Baker, Robert Renzetti, Sean Bishop, Robert Griffith, Garrett Ho, Mark Zoeller, Eddy Houchins, Kirk Tingblad, Thomas Bernardo & Todd Kurosawa	December 14, 2002	4356-826
There is a big blizzard outside, which means that the House of Mouse is closed for the day until Salty the Seal shows up, looking for some entertainment, so Mickey decides to make a special show just for him. Cartoons: Pluto's Seal Deal (2000), Mickey's Remedy (1999), Donald's Dynamite: Snowman (1999)
48	22	"Pete's House of Villains"	Henry Gilroy	Debra Pugh, Larry Scholl, Roy Shishido, Paul Fisher & Garrett Ho	March 2, 2003	4356-853
Due to Pete's continuous complaints about the club, Mickey & the rest of the crew quit and give him full control of the club to prove to him how difficult it really is to manage it. Though Pete finds the business going well, the other villains that he hired to help him cannot hold back their evil tendencies and begin committing evil acts, which makes Pete fire them. In the end, the show is a complete flop, so Pete begs Mickey to come back. Cartoons: Li'l Bad Wolf (2002), Donald's Dynamite: Opera Box (1999), Organ Donors (1999)
49	23	"Halloween with Hades"	Henry Gilroy	Rossen Varbanov, Cynthia Petrovic, Sean Bishop, William Austin & Garrett Ho	October 3, 2003	4356-860
During Halloween night at the House of Mouse, Hades falls in love with Maleficent, and Mickey tries to bring them together. However, all his backfiring attempts enrage Hades, whose villainous side attracts Maleficent. In a way, Mickey does succeed in bringing the two together. Meanwhile, Donald tries to be scary, to no avail. Note: This was the first and only episode to be rated TV-Y7. Cartoons: How to Camp (2002), Donald's Halloween Scare (2000)
50	24	"House Ghosts"	Tracy Berna	Rossen Varbanov, Larry Scholl, Paul Fisher, Thomas Bernardo, Kurt Anderson & Todd Kurosawa	October 10, 2003	4356-817
It is Halloween at the House of Mouse, and Pete unleashes some grim, grinning ghosts onto the club to try and scare everyone away in retaliation for everyone laughing at his Halloween costume. Meanwhile, Donald tries his best to win the costume contest. Note: Donald Duck dresses up as Woody, Buzz Lightyear and a Little Green Man from Toy Story, and Flik from A Bug's Life, being the first and only time in which Pixar productions are referenced in the series. Cartoons: Hansel and Gretel (1999), Pluto Gets the Paper: Spaceship (1999), How to Haunt a House (1999) Special guest voice: Mr. T
51	25	"House of Genius"	Henry Gilroy	Ed Baker, Paul Fisher, Garrett Ho, Sean Bishop & Jeroen Verschoor	October 17, 2003	4356-839
Ludwig Von Drake replaces the staff with robotic versions of themselves to make the club more efficient, but everyone soon starts to miss the real versions. Cartoons: Futuremania (2003), Mickey's Mechanical House (1999)
52	26	"Mickey and the Culture Clash"	Kevin D. Campbell	Cynthia Petrovic, Paul Fisher, Thomas Bernardo, Robert Griggs, Garrett Ho, Todd Kurosawa, Robert McKnight & Lyndon Ruddy	October 24, 2003	4356-855
Mickey thinks that Minnie is looking for a more sophisticated boyfriend, and Mortimer offers to "help". At the end of the episode, they find out that it was Mortimer Mouse looking for a new pal. Cartoons: Mickey's Piano Lesson (1999), Dance of the Goofys (1999), Maestro Minnie: Brahms' Lullabye (1999)

== Films (2001–02) ==
The series also includes two direct-to-video films on VHS and DVD, which include cartoons and some recycled scenes from the episodes.

No.	Title	Written by	Storyboard by	Original release date
1	"Mickey's Magical Christmas: Snowed in at the House of Mouse"	Thomas Hart	Rossen Varbanov, Sean Bishop, Cynthia Petrovic, Paul Fisher, Garrett Ho, Thomas Bernardo, Phillip Mosness & Robert McKnight	November 6, 2001
The club is snowed in, while the staff tries to get Donald into the Christmas spirit. Cartoons: Donald on Ice (1999), Pluto's Christmas Tree (1952), Mickey's Christmas Crisis (2000) (clip), The Nutcracker (1999), Mickey's Christmas Carol (1983)
2	"Mickey's House of Villains"	Thomas Hart	Paul Fisher, Rossen Varbanov, Cynthia Petrovic, Thomas Bernardo & Andrew Austin	September 3, 2002
The villains take over the House of Mouse on Halloween. Cartoons: Trick or Treat (1952), Mickey's Mechanical House (1999), How to Haunt a House (1999), Lonesome Ghosts (1937), Dance of the Goofys (1999), Donald Duck and the Gorilla (1944), Donald's Halloween Scare (2000), Hansel and Gretel (1999)
