= Chip an' Dale =

1947 cartoon featuring Donald Duck and Chip 'n' Dale

- Theatrical release poster
- Directed by: Jack Hannah
- Story by: Dick Kinney; Bob North
- Produced by: Walt Disney
- Starring: Clarence Nash; Jimmy MacDonald; Dessie Flynn
- Music by: Oliver Wallace
- Animation by: Jack Boyd; Volus Jones; Bill Justice; Murray McClellan
- Layouts by: Yale Gracey
- Backgrounds by: Ralph Hulett
- Color process: Technicolor
- Production company: Walt Disney Productions
- Distributed by: RKO Radio Pictures
- Release date: November 28, 1947; (USA)
- Running time: 6:37
- Country: United States
- Language: English

Chip an' Dale is a 1947 animated short film produced in Technicolor by Walt Disney Productions and released to theaters by RKO Radio Pictures. The film depicts Donald Duck's first encounter with the two chipmunks Chip 'n' Dale when he unknowingly chops down their tree for firewood. The title of the film is the first appearance of the names of the two chipmunk characters who previously appeared without names in Private Pluto (1943) and Squatter's Rights (1946). The film Chip an' Dale is also the first time that Chip and Dale are distinguishable from each other, both physically and in personality.

Chip an' Dale was directed by Jack Hannah and features original music by Oliver Wallace. The voice cast includes Clarence Nash as Donald and Jimmy MacDonald and Dessie Flynn as Chip and Dale respectively.

Along with another Disney film, Pluto's Blue Note, Chip an' Dale was nominated for an Academy Award for Best Animated Short Film in 1948. Both ultimately lost to Tweetie Pie, a film by Warner Bros. Cartoons.

== Plot ==
Donald Duck, while staying in a rustic winter cabin, gets out of bed to collect firewood for a fire. He chops down a small topped tree which happens to be the home of two chipmunks Chip and Dale who follow him back to the cabin. After Donald places the log in the fireplace, while Donald is looking for the matches Chip and Dale get their nuts out of the log but it's too late. Donald lights it, and while he's warming himself by the fire, the chipmunks sneak in behind his back, extinguish the fire, and blatantly carry the log out of the cabin in front of Donald. An extremely amused Donald easily takes it from them as they leave the cabin.

The chipmunks later climb the roof and throw snowballs down the chimney in order to extinguish Donald's fire. Donald climbs up the chimney, rolls the chipmunks into a snowball and rolls them off the roof.

Coming up with a new plan, Chip whispers in Dale's ear. Dale listens intently, and nods, agreeing to the plan. Chip climbs a steep hill directly in front of the front door of Donald's cabin and rolls a snowball down the hill. Dale laughs and at Chip's signal, knocks on the door to get Donald to answer. As the snowball rolls down the hill, it gets bigger and gains momentum. Finally, Donald answers the door just as the massive snowball hits.

Chip and Dale retrieve their log, and as they are leaving, Dale takes an opportunity to kick Donald as he is helplessly embedded in the snow having his rear exposed.

== Voice cast ==
- Chip: Jimmy MacDonald
- Dale: Dessie Flynn
- Donald Duck: Clarence Nash

== Home media ==
The short was released on December 11, 2007 on Walt Disney Treasures: The Chronological Donald, Volume Three: 1947-1950.

Additional release include:

- Chip 'n' Dale (with Donald Duck) (VHS)
- Starring Chip 'n' Dale (DVD)
