= Out of Scale =

1951 Donald Duck cartoon

- Theatrical release poster
- Directed by: Jack Hannah
- Story by: Bill Berg; Nick George
- Produced by: Walt Disney
- Starring: Clarence Nash; James MacDonald; Dessie Flynn
- Music by: Paul Smith
- Animation by: Bob Carlson; Volus Jones; Bill Justice; George Kreisl; Dan MacManus (effects)
- Layouts by: Yale Gracey
- Backgrounds by: Art Riley
- Color process: Technicolor
- Production company: Walt Disney Productions
- Distributed by: RKO Radio Pictures
- Release date: November 2, 1951
- Running time: 7 minutes
- Country: United States
- Language: English

Out of Scale is a 1951 American animated short film directed by Jack Hannah and produced by Walt Disney. In the short, Donald Duck has a ride-on sized train layout in his backyard. There is a large tree (home to Chip 'n' Dale) that is out of scale, so Donald moves it while they are out. They come back to see their tree moving. The chipmunks realise that one of Donald's model houses is perfect for their size.

== Plot ==
The short begins with a shot of a mighty steam locomotive barreling down the track, which is actually a miniature scale model, with Donald Duck conducting it around an intricate layout in his backyard. After a stop in the model town of Canyonville, Donald gets off the train to place the miniature trees he is holding. He bumps into a real tree, which offends him due to being out of scale for his layout. Donald prepares to remove the tree, which is occupied by Chip 'n' Dale.

In a display of tremendous strength, Donald picks up the full sized tree and carries it to a flatcar on the model train. As Chip 'n' Dale return to investigate their missing tree, Donald promptly kicks them out of the area, as they are out of scale as well.

Chip and Dale give chase in an attempt to get their tree back and are able to stop the train using the brake wheel on the caboose, but the tree proves too heavy for them to move. Donald again aggressively chases the chipmunks away using an oilcan. While running from him, they take refuge in one of the miniature houses elsewhere on the layout. Finding the model comfortable, Chip and Dale make themselves at home.

Donald discovers the chipmunks by noticing smoke coming from the model houses' chimney. His initial anger towards them quickly gives way to enthusiasm when he sees that the chipmunks are, in fact, the perfect scale for the model house. Enjoying the new occupants, Donald goes so far as to serve as a milkman for them, and tuck them in at bedtime.

Donald's affection is short-lived, however, as he then decides to have fun at the chipmunks expense by subjecting them to extreme environmental conditions. Realizing that Donald has turned on them, the chipmunks set out to finally reclaim their tree. They commandeer the model train that is still holding the tree and take off with it. When the tree can't fit through a tunnel, it flips over and lands re-planted along the railroad track. The impact of the train hitting the tree then cuts a small tunnel through the trunk.

Donald is once again angered, but the chipmunks quickly place a "Giant Redwood" sign on the tree and claim it is a scale model of a California Giant Redwood with a tunnel. Satisfied with the explanation, Donald bids Chip and Dale farewell, and rides his train through the tunnel as the chipmunks celebrate their victory.

== Voice cast ==
- Clarence Nash as Donald Duck
- James MacDonald and Dessie Flynn as Chip and Dale

== Television ==
- Disneyland, episode #2.25: "Where Do the Stories Come From?"
- Good Morning, Mickey, episode #3
- The Ink and Paint Club, episode #1.5: "Chip 'N Dale"
- Have a Laugh!, episode #55
- Treasures from the Disney Vault (March 16, 2017)

== Home media ==
The short was released on November 11, 2008 on Walt Disney Treasures: The Chronological Donald, Volume Four: 1951-1961.

Additional physical releases include:

- Walt Disney Cartoon Classics: Chip 'n' Dale (with Donald Duck) (VHS)
- Everybody Loves Donald (VHS)
- Chip 'n' Dale Volume 1: Here Comes Trouble (DVD)
- Everybody Loves Donald (DVD)
- So Dear to My Heart (Disney Movie Club exclusive DVD)

The short has also since been made available to stream on Disney+.

== Notes ==
- The short's title was later used for an episode of Chip 'n Dale Rescue Rangers.
- The short was inspired by Walt Disney's backyard miniature railroad, the Carolwood Pacific Railroad.
- The cartoon's storyline was the basis for the Little Golden Book "Donald Duck's Toy Train".
- The main musical theme is an arrangement of "I've Been Working on the Railroad".
- Donald Duck's train is actually Casey Jones' train from The Brave Engineer. It consists of Engine No. 2/Johnny (a 4-4-0 "American" type steam locomotive based on Central Pacific #173), a mail car, a flatcar, and a caboose numbered 53.
