= Winter Storage =

1949 Donald Duck cartoon

- Theatrical release poster
- Directed by: Jack Hannah
- Story by: Bill Berg; Nick George
- Produced by: Walt Disney
- Starring: Clarence Nash; Dessie Flynn; Jimmy MacDonald
- Music by: Oliver Wallace
- Animation by: Jack Boyd; Bob Carlson; Volus Jones; Bill Justice
- Layouts by: Yale Gracey
- Backgrounds by: Thelma Witmer
- Color process: Technicolor
- Production company: Walt Disney Productions
- Distributed by: RKO Radio Pictures
- Release date: June 3, 1949; (US)
- Running time: 6:40
- Country: United States
- Language: English

Winter Storage is a 1949 American animated short film produced by Walt Disney Productions and released by RKO Radio Pictures. Part of the Donald Duck series, the film stars Chip 'n' Dale who steal Donald's acorns while he is planting oak trees. It was directed by Jack Hannah and features the voices of Clarence Nash as Donald, and Jimmy MacDonald and Dessie Flynn as Chip and Dale.

== Plot ==
Screenshot

Chip and Dale are not able to find enough acorns to store up for the winter due to all the acorns in the forest being picked. The chipmunks then see Donald Duck, working as a park ranger, beginning to seed a clearing in the oak forest. Seeing his large sack of acorns, they set out to steal it. They manage to make off with the entire sack (even after Dale tries to follow Donald's advice), but Donald who figures out the plot, easily takes it from them just as they enter the ground entrance to their tree, then places a box trap (baited with an acorn) which successfully ensnares both chipmunks despite Chip being fully aware of the ruse and them trying to get out of the mess. While the chipmunks argue with each other, Donald looks on amused and provokes them to fight.

Finally the chipmunks figure out his dirty tricks and run for the acorns. Donald stands in front of the tree entrance to keep the acorns from going inside. Chip and Dale then pick up hockey sticks. Using teamwork and natural hockey skills, the chipmunks beat Donald at his favorite sport, and finally flatten him with an overwhelming acorn "stampede", filling up the entire tree. A dazed Donald knocks at the door and hits in one last acorn at the chipmunks and laughs at them as if he has won the battle while they conclude that Donald has lost his mind.

== Voice cast ==
- Clarence Nash as Donald Duck
- Jimmy MacDonald as Chip
- Dessie Flynn as Dale

== Home media ==
The short was released on December 11, 2007 on Walt Disney Treasures: The Chronological Donald, Volume Three: 1947-1950.

Additional releases include:

- Have a Laugh Volume 1
