= Jimmy MacDonald (sound effects artist) =

English-American sound artist and voice actor (1906–1991)

- Born: John James MacDonald; May 19, 1906; Crewe, Cheshire, England
- Died: February 1, 1991 (aged 84); Glendale, California, U.S.
- Resting place: Forest Lawn Memorial Park Cemetery, Glendale
- Citizenship: United Kingdom; United States
- Occupations: Foley artist; voice actor
- Years active: 1934–1989
- Spouse: Sarah Roberta Cullen (m. 1936)

John James MacDonald (May 19, 1906 – February 1, 1991) was an English-American foley artist and Voice acting|voice actor. He was the original head of the Disney sound-effects department and was also the second official voice of Mickey Mouse from 1947 to 1976 after Walt Disney stopped playing the character and before Wayne Allwine became the third voice of Mickey in 1977.

== Early life ==
MacDonald was born on May 19, 1906, in Crewe, Cheshire. His parents were Richard William MacDonald and Minnie Hall. The family emigrated to America when MacDonald was a month old. They travelled via the SS Haverford from Liverpool, England, arriving in Philadelphia, Pennsylvania 15 days later.

== Career ==
=== Sound effects ===
As a young man, MacDonald landed a job as a musician on the Dollar Steam Ship Lines, which in 1934 led to an opportunity to record music for a Disney cartoon. He went on to secure a permanent contract with Disney, becoming head of the sound department.

In addition to directing sounds for animated shorts as aurally complicated as Mickey's Trailer (1938), he developed many original inventions and contraptions to achieve expressive sounds for characters such as Casey Jr. the circus train from Dumbo (1941); Evinrude the dragonfly from The Rescuers (1977); the bees in Winnie the Pooh and the Honey Tree (1966); and Buzz-buzz (later called "Spike"), the bee that gets the best of Donald Duck in his 1950s short films. He also made the sound effects of Tick Tock the crocodile from Peter Pan (1953) and Dragon Maleficent from Sleeping Beauty (1959) by using castanets.

MacDonald also added voice effects, including on-screen humming for Kirk Douglas in 20,000 Leagues Under the Sea (1954).

Most of his effects are available on Cartoon Trax Volume 1, from The Hollywood Edge, which was released in 1992. A few of his other effects showed up on other non-Disney sound libraries, such as the International Sound Effects Library, BBC Sound Effects Library, and the Hanna-Barbera Sound Effects Library, both from Sound Ideas. Some other releases containing MacDonald's sound effects include a few specialty sound-effect record releases from Disneyland Records, most notably Chilling, Thrilling Sounds of the Haunted House.

At the time of his death, he was preparing to work on the sounds for Splash Mountain in Tokyo Disneyland and Walt Disney World.

=== Voice acting ===
James MacDonald did the first test yodeling for the dwarfs in Snow White and the Seven Dwarfs (1937) before they brought in professional yodelers as well as doing some sounds for Dopey, such as his hiccuping and sobbing. He also did some of the Dwarfs whistling and sneezing.

By 1947, Walt Disney was getting too busy and hoarse from smoking to continue voicing Mickey Mouse, so he offered the job to MacDonald. MacDonald voiced Mickey Mouse until his retirement in 1976, when he was replaced by his sound-effects protégée, Wayne Allwine, for The New Mickey Mouse Club. MacDonald returned to voice Mickey again, though, for an appearance at the 50th Academy Awards in 1978 and the opening of Star Tours at Disneyland in 1987. Despite formally retiring, MacDonald remained involved with several Disney productions; he voiced Evinrude from The Rescuers (1977) and was often consulted for sound-effects projects.

MacDonald was the original voice actor for Chip, one half of the duo Chip and Dale. He provided the voice of Lumpjaw in Fun and Fancy Free, Jaq and Gus the mice and Bruno the dog in Cinderella (1950), the Dormouse in Alice in Wonderland (1951), Humphrey the Bear, the howling of the dogs at the pound (along with Thurl Ravenscroft) in Lady and the Tramp (1955), the Wolf in The Sword in the Stone (1963), and the hyena in Bedknobs and Broomsticks (1971). He appeared in the film Toby Tyler (1960) as the Circus Band Drummer, but was uncredited and appeared in Fantasia (1940) as one of the musicians

MacDonald played drums in the Firehouse Five Plus Two jazz band. He played with the band on and off from its inception until it disbanded in the early 1970s. MacDonald also voiced Doc in Snow White's Enchanted Wish.

== Later life and death ==
MacDonald married Sarah Roberta Cullen in 1936, they remained married until his death in 1991.

MacDonald died of heart failure at his home in Glendale, California, on February 1, 1991, at the age of 84. He was buried in Glendale's Forest Lawn Memorial Park Cemetery.

== Filmography ==
=== Sound-effects work ===
==== Film ====
Year	Title	Position	Notes
1937	Snow White and the Seven Dwarfs	Sound effects	Sound effects
1938	Mickey's Trailer	Sound effects	Sound effects
1940	Pinocchio	Sound effects	Sound effects
1941	The Reluctant Dragon	Sound effects	Sound effects
1941	Baggage Buster	Sound effects	Sound effects
1941	Dumbo	Sound effects	Sound effects
1942	Bambi	Sound effects	Sound effects
1942	Saludos Amigos	Sound effects	Sound effects
1943	Victory Through Air Power	Sound effects	Sound effects
1944	The Three Caballeros	Sound effects	Sound effects
1946	Make Mine Music	Sound effects	Sound effects
1946	Song of the South	Sound effects	Sound effects
1947	Fun and Fancy Free	Sound effects	Sound effects
1948	Melody Time	Sound effects	Sound effects
1948	Inferior Decorator	Sound effects	Sound effects
1948	Seal Island	Sound effects	Documentary film, sound effects
1948	So Dear to My Heart	Sound effects	Sound effects
1949	Honey Harvester	Sound effects	Sound effects
1949	The Adventures of Ichabod and Mr. Toad	Sound effects	Sound effects
1950	Cinderella	Sound effects	Sound effects
1950	Beaver Valley	Sound effects	Documentary film, sound effects
1951	Nature's Half Acre	Sound effects	Documentary film, sound effects
1951	Alice in Wonderland	Sound effects	Sound effects
1952	The Olympic Elk	Sound effects	Documentary film, sound effects
1952	Water Birds	Sound effects	Documentary film, sound effects
1953	Peter Pan	Sound effects	Sound effects
1953	Bear Country	Sound effects	Documentary film, sound effects
1953	Powlers of the Evergladers	Sound effects	Documentary film, sound effects
1953	The Living Desert	Sound effects	Documentary film, sound effects
1954	The Vanishing Prairie	Sound effects	Documentary film, sound effects
1954	20,000 Leagues Under the Sea	Sound effects	Sound effects
1955	Lady and the Tramp	Sound effects	Sound effects
1955	The African Lion	Sound effects	Documentary film, sound effects
1956	Secret of Life	Sound effects	Documentary film, sound effects
1957	Perri	Sound effects	Sound effects
1958	White Wilderness	Sound effects	Documentary film, sound effects
1959	Sleeping Beauty	Sound effects	Sound effects
1960	Jungle Cat	Sound effects	Documentary film, sound effects
1961	One Hundred and One Dalmatians	Sound effects	Sound effects
1963	The Sword in the Stone	Sound effects	Sound effects
1964	Mary Poppins	Sound effects	Sound effects
1966	Winnie the Pooh and the Honey Tree	Sound effects	Sound effects
1967	The Jungle Book	Sound effects	Sound effects
1968	Winnie the Pooh and the Blustery Day	Sound effects	Sound effects
1968	The Love Bug	Sound effects	Sound effects
1970	The Aristocats	Sound effects	Sound effects
1971	Bedknobs and Broomsticks	Sound effects	Sound effects
1973	Robin Hood	Sound effects	Sound effects
1974	Winnie the Pooh and Tigger Too	Sound effects	Sound effects
1977	The Many Adventures of Winnie the Pooh	Sound effects	Sound effects
1977	The Rescuers	Sound effects	Sound effects
1979	The Black Hole	Sound effects	Special sound effects

=== Music ===
Year	Title	Position	Notes
1964	Mary Poppins	Assistant conductor	Credited as James MacDonald
1968	The One and Only, Genuine, Original Family Band	Assistant conductor	Credited as James MacDonald
1971	Bedknobs and Broomsticks	Assistant conductor	Credited as James MacDonald

=== Acting credits ===
==== Film ====
Year	Title	Role	Notes
1936	The Cowboy Star	Still Photographer	Sound effects
1937	Snow White and the Seven Dwarfs	Dopey (voice, hiccuping and crying), Dwarfs (sneezing and whistling)	
1940	Donald's Vacation	Various voices	
1940	Fantasia	Percussionist	
1941	The Reluctant Dragon	Sound effects man	
1942	Out of the Frying Pan Into the Firing Line	Butcher (voice)	
1943	Private Pluto	Chip (voice)	
1946	Squatter's Rights	Chip (voice)	
1947	Fun and Fancy Free	Bongo, Lumpjaw (voice)	
1947	Chip an' Dale	Chip (voice)	
1948	Mickey Down Under	Mickey Mouse (voice)	
1948	Pluto's Purchase	Mickey Mouse (voice)	
1948	Three for Breakfast	Chip (voice)	
1948	Mickey and the Seal	Mickey Mouse (voice)	
1949	Pueblo Pluto	Mickey Mouse (voice)	
1949	Winter Storage	Chip (voice)	
1949	All in a Nutshell	Chip (voice)	
1949	Toy Tinkers	Chip (voice)	
1950	Cinderella	Jaq, Gus, Bruno (voices)	
1950	Crazy Over Daisy	Chip (voice)	
1950	Trailer Horn	Chip (voice)	
1950	Suspense	Jeff	Episode: "Wisteria Cottage"
1950	Food for Feudin'	Chip (voice)	
1950	Out on a Limb	Chip (voice)	
1951	Chicken in the Rough	Chip (voice)	
1951	Corn Chips	Chip (voice)	
1951	Plutopia	Mickey Mouse (voice)	
1951	Test Pilot Donald	Chip (voice)	
1951	Alice in Wonderland	Dormouse (voice)	
1951	R'coon Dawg	Mickey Mouse (voice)	
1951	Out of Scale	Chip (voice)	
1952	Donald Applecore	Chip (voice)	
1952	Lambert the Sheepish Lion	Wolf (voice)	
1952	2 Chips and a Miss	Chip (voice)	
1952	Pluto's Party	Mickey Mouse (voice)	
1952	Pluto's Christmas Tree	Mickey Mouse, Chip (voices)	
1953	The Simple Things	Mickey Mouse (voice)	
1953	Rugged Bear	Humphrey the Bear (voice)	
1953	Working for Peanuts	Chip (voice)	
1954	The Lone Chipmunks	Chip (voice)	
1954	Dragon Around	Chip (voice)	
1954	Grin and Bear It	Humphrey the Bear (voice)	
1954	Social Lion	Lion (voice)	
1954	20,000 Leagues Under the Sea	Ned Land humming "Whale of a Tale" (voice)	
1955	Bearly Asleep	Humphrey the Bear (voice)	
1955	Beezy Bear	Humphrey the Bear (voice)	
1955	Up a Tree	Chip (voice)	
1956	Chips Ahoy	Chip (voice)	
1956	Hooked Bear	Humphrey the Bear (voice)	
1956	In the Bag	Humphrey the Bear (voice)	
1959	Noah's Ark	Animal sounds (voice)	
1960	Toby Tyler or Ten Weeks with a Circus	Drummer	
1963	The Sword in the Stone	Wolf (voice)	
1966	Winnie the Pooh and the Honey Tree	Bees (voice)	
1967	The Adventures of Bullwhip Griffin	Saloon Percussionist	
1967	The Jungle Book	Shere Khan, Bagheera (voice, roaring)	
1968	The Mickey Mouse Anniversary Show	Mickey Mouse (voice)	
1971	Bedknobs and Broomsticks	Hyena (voice)	
1977	The Rescuers	Evinrude (voice)	
1981	The Fox and the Hound	The Bear (voice, archive audio only)	

==== Television ====
Year	Title	Role	Notes
1955–1968	The Magical World of Disney	Mickey Mouse, Chip, Lumpjaw (voices)	Episodes: "The Mickey Mouse Anniversary Show", "This Is Your Life", "Pluto's Day", "Adventures of Mickey Mouse", "Jiminy Cricket Presents Bongo"
1989	Chip 'n Dale: Rescue Rangers	Humphrey the Bear (voice)	Episode: "Bearing Up Baby"

==== Theme park attractions ====
Year	Title	Role
1971	Mickey Mouse Revue	Mickey Mouse (voice)
2021	Snow White's Enchanted Wish	Doc (voice)

Preceded by Original voice	Voice of Chip; 1943–1977	Succeeded by Tress MacNeille

Preceded by Walt Disney	Voice of Mickey Mouse; 1947–1977	Succeeded by Wayne Allwine
