= Out on a Limb (1950 film) =

1950 Disney cartoon featuring Donald Duck and Chip 'n' Dale

- Theatrical release poster
- Directed by: Jack Hannah
- Story by: Bill Berg; Nick George
- Produced by: Walt Disney
- Starring: Clarence Nash; Dessie Flynn; Jimmy MacDonald
- Music by: Joseph Dubin
- Animation by: Bob Carlson; Volus Jones; Bill Justice
- Layouts by: Yale Gracey
- Backgrounds by: Thelma Witmer
- Color process: Technicolor
- Production company: Walt Disney Productions
- Distributed by: RKO Radio Pictures
- Release date: December 15, 1950
- Running time: 6:20
- Country: United States
- Language: English

Out on a Limb is a 1950 Walt Disney Animation Studios short featuring Donald Duck and Chip 'n' Dale.

== Plot ==
Donald, acting as a tree surgeon, walks up to a tree. He climbs a ladder, cuts a branch and puts tar on it, when an acorn falls on his beak. He looks up and sees Chip and Dale putting acorns in their tree. As a prank, Donald disturbs the peace by cutting their branch and puts tar on it, sticking the pair together.

Donald then makes a joke with his leaf cutter (resembling a Shoebill) to make the chipmunks think it's a scary bird, frightening them. Donald then makes his cutter an acorn cracker which causes the chipmunks to get mad when they figured out his prank, so they put a stone on the cutter, smashing Donald into the ground.

Chip goes to check and meets an angry Donald. A chase ensues, and the chipmunks hide in some leaves. Donald gets his lawn mower, which not only cuts the leaves but also the chipmunks' ears off.

Donald eventually ends up getting an electric shock on the high-voltage wires and falls on the leaves. Chip 'n' Dale then put the tar on Donald, causing him to turn into a "leaf monster", and the chipmunks laugh in triumph, only to accidentally get their tar-covered hands glued together again.

== Voice cast ==
- Donald Duck: Clarence Nash
- Chip: Jimmy MacDonald
- Dale: Dessie Flynn

== Home media ==
The short was released on December 11, 2007, on Walt Disney Treasures: The Chronological Donald, Volume Three: 1947-1950.
