= Pluto's Christmas Tree =

1952 Mickey Mouse cartoon

- Theatrical release poster
- Directed by: Jack Hannah
- Story by: Bill Berg; Milt Schaeffer
- Produced by: Walt Disney
- Starring: Jimmy MacDonald; Clarence Nash; Pinto Colvig; Dessie Flynn; Ruth Clifford
- Music by: Joseph Dubin
- Animation by: George Kreisl; Fred Moore; Bill Justice; Volus Jones
- Layouts by: Yale Gracey
- Backgrounds by: Thelma Witmer
- Color process: Technicolor
- Production company: Walt Disney Productions
- Distributed by: RKO Radio Pictures
- Release date: November 21, 1952
- Running time: 6:45
- Country: United States
- Language: English

Pluto's Christmas Tree is a 1952 Mickey Mouse cartoon in which Pluto and Mickey cut down a Christmas tree that Chip 'n' Dale live in. It was the 125th short in the Mickey Mouse film series to be released, and the second for that year. While the chipmunks are usually antagonists of Donald Duck, they have pestered Pluto before, in Private Pluto (1943), Squatter's Rights (1946) and Food for Feudin' (1950).

It is one of the few Disney shorts directed by Jack Hannah not to star Donald Duck, although Donald does make a cameo at the end.

== Plot ==
The short film starts with Mickey Mouse and Pluto are searching for a Christmas tree, while Chip 'n' Dale are looking for acorns in the forest. Once the chipmunks see Pluto, they hit him with acorns and escape as he pursues them. Once Pluto is distracted, they hide in a Christmas tree. Mickey chops down that very tree, unaware that the 2 are in it.

Once they get home, Mickey and Pluto decorate the Christmas tree and Pluto admires it, but then he notices a light going on and off and investigates it. Dale, who was playing with the light, mistakes Pluto's nose for another light and twists it, revealing himself to Pluto, who then barks at him. Dale retaliates by throwing down ornaments to distract him. Mickey comes by and takes the Christmas ornaments from Pluto, unknowingly hanging one of them on Dale, who Pluto fails to alert Mickey to. Pluto then spots Dale stealing chestnuts and chases him up to the top of the fireplace with Santa Claus candle figures. Dale takes a red hat and a white beard from one of the Santa Claus candle figures as a disguise. Pluto notices the strange figure, but he again fails to expose him to Mickey since Mickey doesn't understand his barks. Frustrated, Pluto knocks the other figures away except for Dale. Chip then notices from the tree what is going on. He rescues Dale and heads for the tree. Pluto briefly gets his feet stuck in Christmas presents as he gives a chase and he has a difficulty following the chipmunks up the ladder. As Pluto barks at the chipmunks, they cause the ladder to fall down and drop the gold star on top of the Christmas tree onto Pluto's tail. While the chipmunks laugh in victory, Pluto, finally pushed beyond his patience, angrily dives into the Christmas tree to attack the chipmunks.

Mickey notices Pluto and tries to pull him out, but gets pulled in instead up until the tree is stripped of its decorations and leaves. Mickey scolds Pluto for what he did, but notices Chip and Dale with only a few decorations and all of the branches bare, finally realizing what's really going on. Pluto starts barking at the chipmunks for the trouble they caused until Mickey tells him to stop, saying that it's just the holidays. At the window, they see Donald Duck, Goofy, and Minnie Mouse as the Christmas carolers singing "Deck the Halls". While Mickey and Pluto's friends are singing, Chip and Dale join in, and then Pluto howls in as well, much to the chipmunks' irritation. They then respond by placing a sticker over Pluto's mouth that reads "DO NOT OPEN TIL X-MAS".

== Cast ==
- Jimmy MacDonald as Mickey Mouse and Chip
- Clarence Nash as Donald Duck
- Pinto Colvig as Goofy and Pluto
- Ruth Clifford as Minnie Mouse
- Dessie Flynn as Dale

== Credits ==
- Direction: Jack Hannah
- Animation: George Kreisl, Fred Moore, Bill Justice, Volus Jones
- Storyboards: Bill Berg, Milt Schaffer
- Layout: Yale Gracey
- Background: Thelma Witmer
- Music: Joseph S. Dubin

== Reception ==
In Mickey's Movies: The Theatrical Films of Mickey Mouse, Gijs Grob writes: "Pluto's Christmas Tree is a gem of a film. The story, by Bill Berg and Milt Schaffer, is inspired, and perfectly matches the Christmas atmosphere, while still featuring great gags... The short is cute, adorable, and full of charm, making Pluto's Christmas Tree one of the most delightful Mickey Mouse cartoons from the post-war period."

== Other uses ==
Scenes from this cartoon would be used for Disney's Very Merry Christmas Songs. It would be used for "Deck the Halls" and "Let It Snow! Let It Snow! Let It Snow!". "Deck the Halls" would use scenes from this cartoon only and "Let It Snow! Let It Snow! Let It Snow!" only uses a small part from this cartoon. Scenes would also be used for other Disney collections, including A Disney Christmas Gift.

Scenes from this cartoon along with scenes from Mickey's Christmas Carol were also set to D-TV's video of Brenda Lee's "Rockin' Around the Christmas Tree".

A book published in 1954 from Little Golden Books called Donald Duck's Christmas Tree has the same plot as this cartoon but with Donald Duck instead of Mickey Mouse.

The Encyclopedia of Walt Disney's Characters mistakenly credits Horace Horsecollar and Clarabelle Cow, as appearing in this cartoon.

The Christmas tree and fireplace are on display as props from the short in the queue of the Mickey & Minnie's Runaway Railway attraction at Disneyland.

== Home media ==
The short was released on May 18, 2004 on Walt Disney Treasures: Mickey Mouse in Living Color, Volume Two: 1939-Today.

Additional releases include:

- 1981/2000 - A Walt Disney Christmas (VHS)
- Mickey's Magical Christmas: Snowed in at the House of Mouse: 2001 (DVD and VHS), 2009 (cartoon is a segment in the film)
- 2005 - Walt Disney's Classic Cartoon Favorites Volume 9: Classic Holiday Stories (DVD)
- 2011 - Walt Disney Animation Collection: Classic Short Films Volume 7: Mickey's Christmas Carol (DVD)
- 2013 - Mickey's Christmas Carol 30th Anniversary Edition (DVD, Blu-ray)
- 2018 - Olaf's Frozen Adventure (Blu-ray/DVD/Digital HD)
- 2019 - Disney+ (streaming)

== See also ==
- Mickey Mouse (film series)
- List of Christmas films
