= A Disney Christmas Gift =

- Walt Disney episode
- Original air date: December 4, 1982
- Running time: 60 minutes

"A Disney Christmas Gift" is an animated Christmas television special produced by Walt Disney Productions. It was originally broadcast on CBS on December 4, 1982, as part of the Walt Disney anthology series.

The special is a Christmas-themed compilation of classic short cartoons featuring Mickey Mouse and Donald Duck combined with excerpts from Disney feature films, including Melody Time, Bambi, Peter Pan, The Sword in the Stone and Cinderella. Three holiday-themed theatrical shorts are also included: the 1933 Silly Symphony short The Night Before Christmas, 1945's Donald Duck short The Clock Watcher and 1952's Pluto short Pluto's Christmas Tree.

== Production ==
The opening and closing numbers, featuring the song "On Christmas Morning" and its reprise, showcased Christmas at Disneyland. The lyrics were written by Linda Laurie with music by John Debney.

=== Home media ===
Throughout the 1980s and 1990s, the original full-length and shortened versions of A Disney Christmas Gift were rebroadcast on CBS and The Disney Channel. It was released on VHS, Betamax, CED and LaserDisc in 1984 and again in the 1990s but has not yet been released on DVD.

== Featured segments ==
- "Once Upon a Wintertime" – Melody Time (1948)
- "Mickey Mouse, Pluto and Chip 'n' Dale" – Pluto's Christmas Tree (1952)
- "Bambi and Thumper" – Bambi (1942)
- "Peter Pan and the Darling children" – Peter Pan (1953) (with song lyrics on screen)
- "Donald Duck" – The Clock Watcher (1945)
- "Merlin, Arthur and Archimedes" – The Sword in the Stone (1963)
- "Cinderella and Fairy Godmother" – Cinderella (1950) (with song lyrics on screen)
- "Santa Claus" – The Night Before Christmas (1933)

== Featured segments 1987 TV Special ==
- "Donald Duck" – The Clock Watcher(1945) (Intervals)
- "Mickey Mouse, Minnie Mouse, Donald Duck, Pluto and Goofy" – On Ice (1935)
- "Mickey Mouse, Pluto and Chip 'n' Dale" – Pluto's Christmas Tree (1952)
- "Bambi and Thumper" – Bambi (1942)
- "Peter Pan and the Darling children" – Peter Pan (1953)
- "Donald Duck, José Carioca and Panchito Pistoles, " – The Three Caballeros (1944)
- "Donald Duck and Chip 'n' Dale" – Toy Tinkers (1949)
- "Cinderella and Fairy Godmother" – Cinderella (1950) (with song lyrics on screen)
- "Santa Claus" – The Night Before Christmas (1933)

== Accolades ==
Two years later, it was nominated for Outstanding Animated Program at the 36th Primetime Emmy Awards.

== See also ==
- From All of Us to All of You
