= Donald Applecore =

1952 Donald Duck cartoon

- Theatrical release poster
- Directed by: Jack Hannah
- Story by: Bill Berg; Nick George
- Produced by: Walt Disney
- Starring: Clarence Nash; James MacDonald; Dessie Flynn
- Music by: Joseph Dubin
- Animation by: Bob Carlson; Volus Jones; Bill Justice; George Kreisl; Blaine Gibson (effects)
- Layouts by: Yale Gracey
- Backgrounds by: Thelma Witmer
- Color process: Technicolor
- Production company: Walt Disney Productions
- Distributed by: RKO Radio Pictures
- Release date: January 18, 1952
- Running time: 6:50
- Country: United States
- Language: English

Donald Applecore is a 1952 American animated short film directed by Jack Hannah and produced by Walt Disney. In the short film, Donald Duck is an apple farmer trying to save his crop from Chip 'n' Dale.

== Plot ==
Apple farmer Donald Duck is out to harvest, and notices that the apple crop in the area has been eaten. He catches Chip 'n' Dale in the act when he sees them dumping eaten apple cores into his basket. He captures Dale and demands to know what they intend to do to right the situation. He whispers something to Donald that causes him to excitedly follow him up into the tree. However this is just a trick as they dispose of a large cache of apple cores into Donald's basket. When Donald reaches into their hole to catch them, he receives a nasty bite that causes him to fall out of the tree.

After an unsuccessful attempt to get back a row of uneaten apples from the chipmunks, Donald uses his helicopter to fumigate the area around Chip & Dale's location. However, Chip & Dale use gas masks to easily survive until the gas dissipates. They deal an additional insult to Donald by aggressively hitting him in the face following the "apple core/Baltimore" game.

Back on ground level, Donald sees Chip and Dale rolling lines of stolen apples into the trunk of their tree. Using his helicopter's tail rotor as a saw, Donald cuts open the tree and retrieves a large supply of uneaten apples. Eating one, Donald returns the "apple core/Baltimore" favor and nails Chip with his apple core. Donald then proceeds to deposit the apples into his silo. Upon seeing the much larger collection of apples, Chip and Dale open the bottom of the silo, but Dale carelessly causes a massive landslide as all the apples spill out. As the three emerge from the landslide, Donald grabs Chip and Dale, but loses his hold on them when a leftover apple perched high on the silo ends up hitting him in the face.

Donald snaps and creates a cocktail of numerous dangerous chemicals in the helicopter's spray hopper, topping off the mixture with "atomic pills". The resulting concoction turns the helicopter into a powerful artillery weapon, with Donald shooting explosive charges in Chip and Dale's direction. The final shot from the helicopter sends an "atomic pill" bouncing into the chicken coop, where it is consumed by a hen. The resulting egg ends up making a ticking noise, and subsequently results in a massive nuclear explosion that sends Donald all the way through the Earth to China.

In a final scene that is edited out of later releases due to racial insensitivity, an angry Chinese man is heard yelling at Donald. As the chipmunks drop an apple core into the hole, the Chinese man is heard doing a heavily accented version of the "apple core/Baltimore" gag, culminating in Donald being hit by a gong.

== Voice cast ==
- Clarence Nash as Donald Duck
- Jimmy MacDonald as Chip
- Dessie Flynn as Dale

== Television ==
- Walt Disney Presents, episode #5.20: "The Adventures of Chip 'n' Dale"
- The New Mickey Mouse Club, episode C-003 (January 19, 1977)
- Good Morning, Mickey, episode #5
- Mickey's Mouse Tracks, episode #12
- Donald's Quack Attack, episode #3
- The Ink and Paint Club, episode #1.48: "The Return of Chip 'n' Dale"

== Home media ==
The short was released on November 11, 2008, on Walt Disney Treasures: The Chronological Donald, Volume Four: 1951-1961.

Additional releases include:

- Mickey Mouse and Donald Duck Cartoon Collections, Volume 2 (VHS)
- The Adventures of Chip 'n' Dale (VHS)
- Walt Disney Cartoon Classics: Starring Chip 'n' Dale (VHS)
- Walt Disney Cartoon Classics: Starring Mickey & Minnie / Starring Chip 'n' Dale (LaserDisc)
- Melody Time (DVD)
- Chip 'n' Dale Volume 2: Trouble in a Tree (DVD)

== Notes ==
Footage of this cartoon is shown in a film about the making of Donald Duck Orange Juice, except that the apples are recolored orange to look like oranges.
