= Three for Breakfast =

1948 Donald Duck cartoon

Three For Breakfast
- Theatrical release poster
- Directed by: Jack Hannah
- Story by: Nick George
- Produced by: Walt Disney
- Starring: Clarence Nash; James MacDonald; Dessie Flynn
- Music by: Oliver Wallace
- Animation by: Bob Carlson; Volus Jones; Bill Justice; Dan MacManus
- Layouts by: Yale Gracey
- Backgrounds by: Thelma Witmer
- Color process: Technicolor
- Production company: Walt Disney Productions
- Distributed by: RKO Radio Pictures
- Release date: November 5, 1948; (USA)
- Running time: 7:04
- Country: United States
- Language: English

Three For Breakfast is an American animated short film directed by Jack Hannah. Part of the Donald Duck film series, the film was produced in Technicolor by Walt Disney Productions and released to theaters by RKO Radio Pictures on November 5, 1948.

The cartoon stars Donald Duck cooking himself a pancake breakfast at home. Donald is confounded by two chipmunks living in his stovepipe, Chip and Dale, who eventually succeed in stealing Donald's pancakes. Clarence Nash stars as Donald while James MacDonald and Dessie Flynn voice Chip and Dale, respectively. The film includes original music by Oliver Wallace.

== Plot ==
Donald Duck is cooking pancakes in his kitchen, singing "Shortnin' Bread", when two chipmunks, Chip 'n' Dale, get wind of the smell wafting through their home in the stovepipe while eating acorns. Once inside, they steal a few of Donald's pancakes by throwing a fork tied to a piece of string, but Donald soon discovers the chipmunks, and puts down a pot holder on his stack of pancakes for them to catch, but the chipmunks throw it back. They throw the fork again, but it misses the pancakes and it hits a bottle of rubber cement, causing it to spill. It forms into a fake pancake, giving Donald an idea. He puts down the "pancake" and when the chipmunks catch it, Donald grabs onto it. He then lets go of it while the chipmunks are pulling it. The chipmunks try taking a bite out of it and get into a tug of war with it, until Donald puts down a fork which pokes Chip while he is walking backwards, causing him to yelp in pain and let go of the "pancake". It hits the wall and springs back, hitting Donald in the face. Donald furiously chases the chipmunks and they hide in the toaster, but Donald pulls down the lever and waits. The chipmunks pop out and Donald catches them, but Dale bites his finger, causing him to shout in pain and let the chipmunks go. They then catch the pancakes with the string and bring them up to the roof, but Donald grabs the rubber cement pancake and tugs on it, tying up his entire house in the process. He climbs up to the roof, but Dale applies butter to the roof and has Donald lift his foot as he puts butter under it, causing Donald to slide down. He is then sent on a wild ride and unties the house. The cartoon ends with Donald jammed in the stovepipe, grimacing in an Asian stereotype and Dale imitating him as the chipmunks celebrate their victory.

== Voice cast ==
- Clarence Nash as Donald Duck
- James MacDonald as Chip
- Dessie Flynn as Dale

== Releases ==
- 1948 - original theatrical release

== Home media ==
The short was released on December 11, 2007, on Walt Disney Treasures: The Chronological Donald, Volume Three: 1947-1950.

Additional releases include:

- 1983 - "Chip 'n' Dale (with Donald Duck)" (VHS)
- 2005 - "Starring Chip 'n' Dale" (DVD)
