= Mickey's Magical Christmas: Snowed in at the House of Mouse =

- DVD cover
- Directed by: Roberts Gannaway; Tony Craig
- Screenplay by: Thomas Hart
- Based on: Disney's House of Mouse by Roberts Gannaway; Tony Craig Mickey Mouse by Walt Disney; Ub Iwerks
- Produced by: Melinda Rediger
- Starring: Wayne Allwine; Tony Anselmo; Bill Farmer; Russi Taylor; Corey Burton; Tress MacNeille; Jodi Benson; Kath Soucie; Pat Carroll; Kevin Schon; Ernie Sabella; Jim Cummings
- Narrated by: John Cleese
- Edited by: Ellen Keneshea
- Music by: Michael Tavera
- Production company: Walt Disney Television Animation
- Distributed by: Buena Vista Home Entertainment (Note: Distributed by Buena Vista Home Entertainment under the Walt Disney Home Video and Walt Disney Pictures banners.)
- Release date: November 6, 2001
- Running time: 65 minutes
- Country: United States
- Language: English

Mickey's Magical Christmas: Snowed in at the House of Mouse is a 2001 American animated direct-to-video Christmas comedy fantasy crossover film. It includes two Disney short films, 1952's Pluto's Christmas Tree and 1983's Mickey's Christmas Carol, as well as three 1999 episodes of Mickey Mouse Works (albeit one of them only as a shortened skit). Mickey's Magical Christmas: Snowed in at the House of Mouse was released by Walt Disney Home Video on November 6, 2001.

== Plot ==
After a successful Christmas Eve show, Mickey wishes the guests a safe trip home. However, Goofy points out that they and the guests cannot leave the House of Mouse as a snowstorm has blocked up all the exits. The guests are worried, but Mickey decides to hold a free-of-charge Christmas party for them until the storm lets up. Unfortunately, Donald is not feeling the Christmas spirit, so Mickey and Minnie play different Christmas cartoons to get him in the spirit.

The cartoons they show include Donald trying to ice-skate and constantly destroying snowmen Huey, Dewey and Louie are building in a competition, Pluto trying to get Chip and Dale out of Mickey's Christmas tree, the Mickey version of The Nutcracker, along with Ludwig Von Drake's "The Science of Santa", Mickey decorating his house in blinding lights that can be seen outside of town, and interviews about what everyone wants for Christmas or feels grateful for.

After all this, everyone, including villains like Jafar, is happy that everyone is enjoying Christmas. However, Donald still refuses to change his mood, promptly souring the crowd's mood. Upset that everything he tried did not lift Donald's Christmas spirit, Mickey heads to the roof, where he tells Jiminy Cricket that all he wanted was for his friend to be happy and enjoy Christmas; Jiminy advises him to wish upon a star. Mickey does so and the star falls into his hands. Mickey returns to Donald, whom he offers the honor of putting the star on the tree. Donald does so, instantly becoming jolly. The star magically begins redecorating the club, turning the wreaths golden and giving the Magic Mirror a Santa hat, while turning Sorcerer Yen Sid's sorcerer's hat into a Santa hat and turning Jafar's staff into a candy cane. Various languages saying Merry Christmas appear on the television as Mickey announces one last cartoon before a carol. Then everyone gathers on the stage, singing "The Best Christmas of All". Mickey wishes everyone a Merry Christmas as Tinker Bell ends the film.

== Voice cast ==
- Wayne Allwine and Jimmy MacDonald (archival footage) as Mickey Mouse
- Russi Taylor as Minnie Mouse
- Tony Anselmo and Clarence Nash (archival footage) as Donald Duck, Huey, Dewey and Louie
- Tress MacNeille as Daisy Duck, Chip, and Dale
- Bill Farmer and Hal Smith (archival footage) as Goofy, Pluto, and Practical Pig
- Jeff Bennett as Lumiere
- Jodi Benson as Ariel
- Robby Benson as Beast
- Corey Burton as Ludwig Von Drake, Gus, Grumpy and Mad Hatter
- Eddie Carroll as Jiminy Cricket
- Pat Carroll as Ursula
- John Cleese as The Narrator (The Nutcracker segment)
- Peter Cullen as Eeyore
- Jonathan Freeman as Jafar
- Jennifer Hale as Cinderella
- J.P. Manoux as Kuzco
- Mark Moseley as Mushu
- Paige O'Hara as Belle
- Rob Paulsen as Jaq
- Ernie Sabella as Pumbaa
- Kevin Schon as Timon
- Michael Welch as Pinocchio
- April Winchell as Mother Von Drake
- Rick Logan as Aladdin / Chorus
- Bobbi Page as Jasmine / Chorus
- Blayne Weaver as Peter Pan
- Patricia Parris as Daisy Duck (Mickey's Christmas Carol segment)
- Alan Young as Scrooge McDuck (Mickey's Christmas Carol segment)
- Will Ryan as Pete, Willie the Giant (Mickey's Christmas Carol segment)

== Cartoons ==
- Donald on Ice (1999)
- Pluto's Christmas Tree (1952)
- Mickey's Christmas Crisis (1999)
- The Nutcracker (1999)
- Mickey's Christmas Carol (1983)

== Production ==
Produced by Walt Disney Television Animation, with the animation production being done at Toon City Animation in Manila, Philippines, it was the first of two direct-to-video films spin off from the Disney Channel animated television series House of Mouse, the other being Mickey's House of Villains. The events of the film take place during the second season of House of Mouse.

== Reception ==
Zach Gass of Screen Rant named Mickey's Magic Christmas: Snowed In at the House of Mouse one of their "ten picks for best Disney Christmas Cartoons," writing, "While trying to keep things merry and bright, Mickey shows some entertaining Christmas-themed escapades on screen, as well as a showing of Mickey's Christmas Carol before ending in a very touching (though sappy) Christmas song in front of the fire sung by all the characters. It's not perfect, but it's a great way to start." Evan Jacobs of MovieWeb said, "As you can imagine it showcases jokes, sight gags, and all the whimsical animated moments that Disney films have made so famous over the years. Rich in holiday spirit and soaked in the importance of family, Mickey's Magic Christmas: Snowed In at the House of Mouse is a Santa Safe film for any time of year." Time Out ranked Mickey's Magic Christmas: Snowed In at the House of Mouse twenty-fifth in their "Best Kids' Christmas Movies To Watch This Year" list of 2022, calling it a "necessity for any mouseketeer in your life."

== Sequel ==
Mickey's House of Villains, a stand-alone sequel to the film, was released on both VHS and DVD by Walt Disney Home Entertainment on September 3, 2002.

== See also ==
- List of Christmas films
