= Up a Tree (1955 film) =

1955 Donald Duck cartoon

- Title card
- Directed by: Jack Hannah
- Story by: Dick Kinney; Milt Schaffer
- Produced by: Walt Disney
- Starring: Clarence Nash; Dessie Flynn; Jimmy MacDonald
- Music by: Oliver Wallace
- Animation by: Bob Carlson; Al Coe; Volus Jones; Bill Justice; Dan MacManus (effects)
- Layouts by: Yale Gracey
- Backgrounds by: Claude Coats
- Color process: Technicolor
- Production company: Walt Disney Productions
- Distributed by: RKO Radio Pictures
- Release date: September 23, 1955; (USA)
- Running time: 6:30
- Country: United States
- Language: English

Up a Tree is a 1955 animated short film produced by Walt Disney Productions and released by RKO Radio Pictures. The film stars Donald Duck and Chip 'n' Dale, with Donald trying to top a tree in which Chip and Dale are living. It was directed by Jack Hannah and features original music by Oliver Wallace.

== Plot ==
Donald Duck is a lumberjack who sets out to top a tall tree on a hill. The tree happens to be the home of chipmunks Chip 'n' Dale, who do whatever it takes to protect it. Chip starts by unhooking the harness holding Donald to the tree, causing him to fall. Confused, Donald scales the tree again to resume his work, but Chip uses a stick to push the harness cord into the path of Donald's saw. Although a hanging branch breaks his fall, Dale drops an acorn on Donald's head to continue his plummet to the ground.

Determined to complete his job, Donald climbs back up the tree with a heavy chain wrapped around his waist. He manages to top the tree, but Chip and Dale are able to push the chain up so it hooks onto the piece Donald cut. Donald falls again, with the topped tree landing on him.

After he gets out from under the topped tree, Donald discovers the chipmunks mocking his plight. Wanting revenge, Donald climbs back up and begins to saw through the hole where Chip and Dale have been hiding. Once again, Donald is foiled by the chipmunks as they mess with his saw, causing him to be flattened by the tree and float down to the ground.

Donald then grabs an axe and begins furiously chopping at what is left of the tree, but it still will not fall as Chip and Dale desperately hold it up. Donald then tries stomping on the log, which finally causes it to break loose and tumble toward a log flume.

Using a pike pole, Donald mounts the log and heads for the sawmill. Chip and Dale catch a ride in a toolbox on a zip line overhead. They ride ahead of Donald, jump from the tool box with a hammer, and dismantle a side of the flume with it. The log goes off the flume and toward a shed, with Donald trying to outrun it in his car and then, thanks again to Chip and Dale, on foot when the log crushes the vehicle. Finally, the log heads into a mine shaft and emerges on the other side with a box of dynamite atop it. Donald frantically reaches home and moves everything out of the log's way as it enters and flies through the house.

The log emerges without damaging anything, to Donald's relief, but it gets caught in the power lines behind the house and is about to be catapulted back toward him. While Dale knocks on the door moments later to point this out to Donald, Chip climbs the log and moves the dynamite nearer to the house. Donald futilely tries to push his house away and the log destroys it upon impact. As Donald looks at his ruined home in stunned grief, Chip and Dale both lend him phony, disingenuous sympathy before they then laugh hysterically at his misfortune as the cartoon ends.

== Voice cast ==
- Clarence Nash as Donald Duck

== Reception ==
In The Disney Films, Leonard Maltin described Up a Tree as one of the "funniest and fastest Donald Duck cartoons... a later effort that has one of the most frenzied string of gags ever concocted for a Disney cartoon."

== Home media ==
The short was released on November 11, 2008 on Walt Disney Treasures: The Chronological Donald, Volume Four: 1951-1961.

Additional releases include:

- Laserdisc - Chip 'N' Dale with Donald Duck
- VHS - Chip 'N' Dale with Donald Duck
- VHS - The Adventures Of Chip 'N' Dale
- DVD - Chip 'n' Dale : Volume 1: Here Comes Trouble

== Television ==
The short was included in House of Mouse episode "Chip 'n' Dale".
