= All in a Nutshell =

1949 Donald Duck cartoon

- Theatrical release poster
- Directed by: Jack Hannah
- Story by: Bill Berg; Nick George
- Produced by: Walt Disney
- Starring: Clarence Nash; Dessie Flynn; Jimmy MacDonald
- Music by: Oliver Wallace
- Animation by: Bill Justice; Judge Whitaker; Bob Carlson; Jack Boyd
- Layouts by: Yale Gracey
- Backgrounds by: Thelma Whitmer
- Color process: Technicolor
- Production company: Walt Disney Productions
- Distributed by: RKO Radio Pictures
- Release date: September 2, 1949 (U.S.)
- Running time: 6:50
- Country: United States
- Language: English

All in a Nutshell is a Donald Duck animated short film produced by Walt Disney Productions and originally released in 1949 by RKO Radio Pictures in Technicolor.

== Plot ==
Donald Duck is the sole-proprietor of a roadside nut butter stand called "Don's Nut Butter". The stand is in the shape of a giant walnut that looks actual. Donald begins the day by placing a bucket of nuts into a hopper that will extract the nut from the shell and crush the nut into a butter. The machine starts a conveyor belt of jars and as they pass under the hopper, the jars are filled. Donald is waiting at the end of the line to label and cap the jars and place them on his shelves commenting that, "These will sell like hot cakes". Donald soon realizes his machine is out of nuts and he must go out to gather more.

As he leaves through a backdoor he notices Chip 'n' Dale gathering nuts for the coming winter season. Donald observes the tree they store the nuts in, knocks on the tree to locate where the nuts are, then drills a hole in the trunk which fills up his bucket. Donald then happily returns to his stand to start the process again. Chip and Dale fall through the drilled hole only to see their nuts scattered along the ground that Donald spilled as he left. As they gather back up their nuts, Dale sees Donald's stand and faints at the sight of this gigantic nut. Chip revives his friend and he himself marvels at the colossal nut, believing it to be an actual one. The two can only imagine at all the meat waiting inside the shell and set about different ways to crack it. Finally the duo get a boulder to roll down hill and crack the top of the stand which alerts Donald who runs out the backdoor looking for the source of the sound.

The chipmunks then peer in through the hole in the top and observe Donald's process. They remove a jar from a shelf and, after sampling the butter, quickly decide to take all the jars for their harvest. As they start removing the jars, Dale notices the hopper filling more jars. He removes a jar and sits on the conveyor belt allowing it to fill him with butter. After doing this several times he rides to the end of the line where Donald absent-mindedly labels him and puts a lid on him. Chip removes him thinking he is a jar and bops him on the head for playing around. The two return to removing more jars until Dale forgets to pick up one which falls onto Donald alerting him of the theft.

He sticks his head through the opening at the top where the chipmunks trap him by the neck with branches. Donald watches Dale use his conveyor belt to remove finished jars of nut butter from his stand. Donald then gets angry and frees himself as the chipmunks make their escape. Donald gives chase evading several hazards placed in his way. Eventually Chip and Dale make it back to their tree which Donald runs into, knocking himself out in the process. Using nutshells as helmets, the two chipmunks run outside and peel Donald off the tree. Donald becomes stiff and they carry him to a fallen tree overlooking a cliff. They load him into the tree as if they were loading an army gun of the era. Dale uses a stick that looks like a sword to cut a hornet's nest which falls into an open hole in the tree. Both then cover their ears as a simulated "firing" of the gun blasts Donald out over the cliff. The chipmunks run to the end of the tree and watch Donald fall into the river, with a "Goofy yell" added for effect. They then remove their nut shell helmets and bow their heads for a moment of silence before laughing, celebrating and dancing in victory as the cartoon immediately irises out after this.

== Voice cast ==
- Donald Duck: Clarence Nash
- Chip: Jimmy MacDonald
- Dale: Dessie Flynn

== Home media ==
The short was released on December 11, 2007, on Walt Disney Treasures: The Chronological Donald, Volume Three: 1947-1950.
