= Toy Tinkers =

1949 Donald Duck cartoon

- Title card
- Directed by: Jack Hannah
- Story by: Harry Reeves; Milt Banta
- Produced by: Walt Disney
- Starring: Clarence Nash; Dessie Flynn; Jimmy MacDonald
- Music by: Paul J. Smith
- Animation by: Bob Carlson; Volus Jones; Bill Justice; Jack Boyd (effects)
- Layouts by: Yale Gracey
- Backgrounds by: Thelma Witmer
- Color process: Technicolor
- Production company: Walt Disney Productions
- Distributed by: RKO Radio Pictures
- Release date: December 16, 1949; (US)
- Running time: 7:30
- Country: United States
- Language: English

Toy Tinkers is an American animated short film produced in Technicolor by Walt Disney Productions and released to theaters on December 16, 1949 by RKO Radio Pictures. Set during Christmas time, the film shows Chip 'n' Dale trying to steal nuts from Donald Duck's home using toy weapons. The film was nominated for an Academy Award for Best Animated Short Film in 1950, but ultimately lost to Warner Bros'. For Scent-imental Reasons, a Pepé Le Pew Looney Tunes film directed by Chuck Jones.

Toy Tinkers was directed by Jack Hannah and features original and adapted music by Paul J. Smith which includes the song "Jingle Bells" and Schubert's Marche Militaire. The voice cast includes Clarence Nash as Donald and Jimmy MacDonald and Dessie Flynn as Chip and Dale respectively.

It was later reissued as Christmas Capers, and 16mm prints of this version still exist.

== Plot ==
Chip and Dale's curiosity leads them into Donald's house after they see him chop down a tree near their log home to use as a Christmas tree. The chipmunks follow Donald to his house and see nuts and candy through a window, deciding to try to take them. They slip in through the mail slot and load the nuts into a toy truck. During the theft, Dale pretends to be in a make-believe neighborhood, before Chip beats him up for playing around.

Donald sees Chip and Dale stealing the nuts and uses the toys to foil them. When the chipmunks catch on, Donald disguises himself as Santa Claus and gives Chip a much larger present than Dale, making him jealous and start fighting with Chip. Donald is laughs at the chipmunks arguing before revealing that inside the large nut is a handgun. He holds them at gunpoint, crashes them in a toy police car, and fires nuts from a pop gun at them. The chipmunks retaliate with a toy cannon when Donald encroaches on them.

Angered, Donald sets up a fort of presents on one side of the living room and returns fire with Chip and Dale doing likewise. Dale covertly sneaks a candlestick telephone into Donald's fort which Chip uses to distract Donald to transmit direct cannon fire. A frustrated Donald loads the phone with a stick of dynamite, but it doesn't explode. When the chipmunks call him again, he answers and the dynamite explodes. Having incapacitated Donald, the chipmunks march back home, and in a scene reminiscent of The Spirit of '76, employ the help of the mechanical toys to transport the hoard of nuts.

== Voice cast ==
- Donald Duck: Clarence Nash
- Chip: Jimmy McDonald
- Dale: Dessie Flynn

== Adaptations ==
A comic book adaptation of the short was published in Walt Disney's Christmas Parade #2, printed by Dell Comics in 1950. This adaptation was titled "Christmas Fray" and "Such a Clatter" in reprints.

== Releases ==
- 1949 - theatrical release
- 1958 - Walt Disney Presents, episode #5.12: "From All of Us to All of You" (TV)
- 2010 - Mickey's Christmas Special

For many years, Toy Tinkers was included as one of the segments of From All of Us to All of You. It was introduced by Jimmany Cricket, together with a song-and-dance number by Chip and Dale. There is also a brief prelude of Chip and Dale chopping and decorating their own christmas tree.

== Home media ==
The short was released on December 11, 2007 on Walt Disney Treasures: The Chronological Donald, Volume Three: 1947-1950.

Additional releases include:

- c. 1960 (Super8)
- 1985 - Cartoon Classics: The Continuing Adventures of Chip 'n' Dale Featuring Donald Duck (VHS)
- 1986 - Jiminy Cricket's Christmas (VHS)
- 2005 - Holiday Celebration with Mickey and Pals (DVD)

== See also ==
- List of Christmas films
