= Chicken in the Rough (film) =

- Poster
- Directed by: Jack Hannah
- Story by: Nick George; Bill Berg
- Produced by: Walt Disney
- Starring: James MacDonald; Dessie Flynn; Florence Gill
- Music by: Joseph Dubin
- Animation by: Bob Carlson; Bill Justice; Judge Whitaker; George Rowley (effects)
- Layouts by: Yale Gracey
- Backgrounds by: Ray Huffine
- Color process: Technicolor
- Production company: Walt Disney Productions
- Distributed by: RKO Radio Pictures
- Release date: January 19, 1951
- Running time: 7:09
- Country: United States
- Language: English

Chicken in the Rough is a 1951 animated short starring Chip 'n' Dale. It is Chip 'n' Dale's first solo cartoon together, and the footage is reused from the Silly Symphony short, Farmyard Symphony (1938). In the short film, Chip 'n' Dale wander into a farmyard to collect acorns. Dale mistakes an egg for a nut, but when he tries to demonstrate to a newly hatched chick how to get back into the egg, a rooster mistakes him for one of his chicks, much to Chip's amusement.

== Plot ==
Chip 'n' Dale are gathering nuts; the nuts fall into the chicken pen. When Dale is playing around with some eggs, one hatches. The chick leaves, and Dale has to pretend to be a chick to avoid the wrath of the rooster.

== Voice cast ==
- Jimmy MacDonald as Chip
- Dessie Flynn as Dale
- Florence Gill and Louise Myers as Hens
- Purv Pullen as Baby Chicks
- Mary Lawrence as Rooster

== Releases ==
=== Television ===
- Walt Disney Presents, episode #5.20: "The Adventures of Chip 'n' Dale"
- Good Morning, Mickey, episode #47
- The Ink and Paint Club, episode #1.48: "The Return of Chip 'n Dale"

=== Home media ===
==== VHS ====
- The Adventures of Chip 'n' Dale
- A Tale of Two Chipmunks

==== DVD ====
- Walt Disney's Classic Cartoon Favorites, Vol. 4: Starring Chip 'n' Dale
- Chip 'n' Dale Volume 1: Here Comes Trouble

== See also ==
- Chip 'n' Dale
- The Lone Chipmunks (1954)
