= Inferior Decorator =

1948 Donald Duck cartoon

- Theatrical release poster
- Directed by: Jack Hannah
- Story by: Lee Morehouse; Bob Moore
- Produced by: Walt Disney
- Starring: Clarence Nash
- Music by: Oliver Wallace
- Animation by: Bill Justice; Volus Jones; Ray Patin; Dan Macmanus
- Layouts by: Yale Gracey
- Backgrounds by: Thelma Witmer
- Color process: Technicolor
- Production company: Walt Disney Productions
- Distributed by: RKO Radio Pictures
- Release date: August 27, 1948
- Running time: 6 minutes
- Country: United States
- Language: English

Inferior Decorator is a 1948 animated Donald Duck short film produced in Technicolor by Walt Disney Productions and released to theaters by RKO Radio Pictures.

== Plot ==
Spike the Bee is pollinating flowers outside Donald Duck's house in his garden. He hears Donald singing, and mistakes the wallpaper for flowers. Donald teases Spike by getting him stuck in glue before freeing him, causing the bee to hit the light, Donald pushes him outside and shuts the window. Spike gets revenge; he removes the key from the lock and decides to sting Donald's rear end, but misses and gets stuck on the wallpaper glue. Donald tugs with the wallpaper and Spike frees himself from the glue. But this causes the wallpaper to stick to the ceiling, with Donald's hands glued to the wallpaper.

Spike sees this opportunity to sting Donald's rear end and dives right at him, but Donald evades the bee's stinger and thwarts him with a bottle cork; this fails, as Spike gets the cork off his stinger. Spike again dives at Donald and misses him. When he sees Donald hiding in the wallpaper on the ceiling, Spike cuts open the wallpaper with his stinger and exposes Donald's rear end. Spike then goes outside and whistles to the bees in the beehive, and they gather together. Spike then invites them inside the keyhole, and lets them in the house, one at a time, to sting Donald's rear end.

== Voice cast ==
- Donald Duck: Clarence Nash

== Home media ==
The short was released on December 11, 2007, on Walt Disney Treasures: The Chronological Donald, Volume Three: 1947-1950. It was released to Disney+ on October 6, 2023.

Additional releases include:

- Classic Cartoon Favorites, Volume Two - Starring Donald (DVD)
