= Donald's Vacation =

1940 Donald Duck cartoon

- Theatrical release poster
- Directed by: Jack King
- Written by: Carl Barks; Jack Hannah
- Produced by: Walt Disney
- Starring: Clarence Nash
- Music by: Oliver Wallace
- Animation by: Jack Hannah; Ed Love; Judge Whitaker
- Color process: Technicolor
- Production company: Walt Disney Productions
- Distributed by: RKO Radio Pictures
- Release date: August 9, 1940
- Running time: 8:41
- Country: United States
- Language: English

Donald's Vacation is a Donald Duck cartoon made by Walt Disney Productions and released by RKO Pictures on August 9, 1940. The film, which was directed by Jack King, shows Donald having many troubles with the outdoors when he goes on vacation.

== Plot ==
Donald Duck is taking a vacation in a canoe. He is shown to walk over rocks while playing a guitar when the canoe can't go, since his feet and legs are sticking out the bottom of it. While playing his guitar, he unwittingly goes through a small waterfall. He coughs violently and shakes water off, and gets a fish in his instrument, but he quickly calms down. Just as he continues playing, he goes over a waterfall and falls to the bottom. After a furious outburst, he emerges from the water with the canoe on his back like a turtle's shell.

Arriving at his campsite, he pulls a lever which ejects all the supplies he brought along. He then converts the canoe into a tent and puts down a sign that says Camp Peaceful. He gets out a folding chair with an umbrella, but has trouble making it fold. His actions eventually cause the chair to come up below him, put the umbrella inside his shirt, and catapult him into the lake and a patch of cattail grass. He emerges with grass on his head like an Indian warrior's dress and stalks back to the campsite underwater. As he continues to struggle with the chair, a group of chipmunks are attracted by the noise and come to investigate. Donald finally gets the chair to work and settles down for a nap, but unknown to him, the chipmunks are using this as an opportunity to steal his food, and begin carrying it off. One of the food items they steal is a Pumpkin, which the chipmunks drill holes into, to make a Jack O' Lantern. Some chipmunks carry celery which tickle Donald’s feet, he laughs hysterically for a while, but goes back to sleep.

Donald doesn't notice them up until two of them, carrying a pineapple, walk below his bottom, poking it with the pineapple's stalks. Donald squawks in pain and gets trapped in the chair again. When he sees the chipmunks taking his food, he gets angry. After getting hit in the face with a banana, he chases after the chipmunks, using the chair as legs for running. During the chase, Donald's umbrella closes on him, giving the chipmunks time to escape, but they wake up a sleeping grizzly bear in the process which proceeds to eat all of Donald's food. An incensed Donald finally breaks free, only to discover what appears to be the chipmunks eating his food. He smashes all the food away and is left clinging to the snout of the bear. After seeing that the "chipmunk's mouth is too big", he realizes that it's a bear and runs away. The bear chases Donald across a log, where Donald thinks he's safe but ends up standing on top of the bear. The bear swipes at him and chases him to a tree. Donald climbs up the tree, but the bear responds by clawing down the bark. Donald slides down the now-slippery trunk to the bottom.

The bear rips away Donald's part of the tree with its paw and Donald (who thinks he is still with the rest of the tree) tries to climb up again but realizes it's only thin air and falls down, almost into the bear's mouth. He escapes just in time and the bear chases him up until it trips. Donald quickly breaks camp, gets into his canoe, and rows up the waterfall and away.

== Voice cast ==
- Donald Duck: Clarence Nash

== Home media ==
The short was released on May 18, 2004 on Walt Disney Treasures: The Chronological Donald, Volume One: 1934-1941.

== Notes ==
The chipmunks in this short are considered by some to be the predecessors of Chip 'n' Dale (who appear in their own cartoon in 1947), although they are in a group, are non-anthropomorphic, and do not have any lines.
