= The Simple Things =

1953 Mickey Mouse cartoon

- Film poster
- Directed by: Charles Nichols
- Written by: Bill Berg
- Produced by: Walt Disney
- Starring: Jimmy MacDonald; Pinto Colvig
- Music by: Paul Smith
- Animation by: Marvin Woodward; Fred Moore; Norman Ferguson
- Layouts by: Lance Nolley
- Backgrounds by: Ed Starr
- Color process: Technicolor
- Production company: Walt Disney Productions
- Distributed by: RKO Radio Pictures (original); Buena Vista Distribution (reissue)
- Release date: March 27, 1953
- Running time: 7:02
- Country: United States
- Language: English

The Simple Things is an animated short film, part of the Mickey Mouse series, produced by Walt Disney Productions. Released by RKO Radio Pictures on March 27, 1953, the short is notable as the 126th and final regular entry in the Mickey Mouse theatrical cartoon series.

Following this short, one-shot Mickey shorts were produced: the featurettes Mickey's Christmas Carol (1983) and The Prince and the Pauper (1990), and the shorts Runaway Brain (1995), Get a Horse! (2013), and Once Upon a Studio (2023).

== Plot ==
At the start of the cartoon, Mickey is seen whistling to the tune of the song "The Simple Things" while walking along a rocky seashore, fishing gear in hand. Pluto, sniffing behind him, spots a mussel as he tries to cover up miniature geysers along the way. The mussel then squirts water at him. Pluto barks at the mussel and the mussel barks back. The mussel gets trapped on Pluto's tail after they fight. He pulls the mussel up and attempts to shove it off his tail but instead, he pulls the mussel up and down like a yo-yo. The mussel accidentally gets stuck in his mouth.

Pluto then rushes to Mickey for assistance. At first, Mickey thinks that Pluto is asking for food and feeds him a hot dog. The mussel then steals Mickey's sandwich and a full pepper shaker which causes the mussel to sneeze thus freeing itself from Pluto's mouth. The mussel bounces around sneezing and wakes up a seagull that decides to eat the mussel. The sneezing mussel escapes the seagull by entering the sea. The hungry seagull steals the hot dog that Mickey is feeding Pluto instead.

The seagull then sets his sights on the fish bait Mickey is using and unsuccessfully attempts to steal the fish while the line is being cast. Dejected but determined, the seagull then sits on top of Mickey's hat and easily steals the fish as he is baiting the hook until Mickey shoos the seagull away. He then floats under the hat to the other bait bucket and again eats the fish until Pluto notices and shoos him away and the seagull by tying up Pluto using his own tail and ears.

Mickey again catches the seagull in his bait and after the bird tries to fly away carrying the bait, Mickey throws a rock in it which weighs it down. To overcome this, the seagull spells out "FREE FRESH FISH" using flag semaphore to get the other seagulls to chase Mickey and Pluto away. The short ends with the seagull floating away with his portable radio and fish in his mouth singing the song "The Simple Things".

== Other appearances ==
The cartoon was featured in the video game Disney's Magical Mirror Starring Mickey Mouse.

== Voice cast ==
- Mickey Mouse: Jimmy MacDonald
- Pluto: Pinto Colvig

== Reception ==
In Mickey's Movies: The Theatrical Films of Mickey Mouse, Gijs Grob writes: "It would have been nice if Mickey went out with a bang, but The Simple Things is anything but that. It's a quiet, unassuming film, in which we find Mickey at his most relaxed... Both storylines are executed routinely, and the whole comedy feels tired and uninspired."

== Home media ==
The short was released on May 18, 2004, on Walt Disney Treasures: Mickey Mouse in Living Color, Volume Two: 1939-Today.

== See also ==
- Mickey Mouse (film series)
