= Ann Lloyd =

Ann Lloyd may refer to:

- Emily Ann Lloyd (born 1984), American actress
- Ann Lloyd Keen (born 1948), British politician
- Anne Aston (born 1948), née Lloyd, British actress
- Anne Lloyd (1942–1996), American singer
- Angharad Llwyd (1780–1866), Welsh antiquary
