= Private Pluto =

- Short film poster
- Directed by: Clyde Geronimi
- Story by: Bill Justice
- Produced by: Walt Disney
- Starring: Pinto Colvig; Norma Swank; Dessie Flynn
- Music by: Oliver Wallace
- Animation by: Al Bertino; Les Clark; Phil Duncan; John Lounsbery; Charles A. Nichols
- Layouts by: Bruce Bushman; Charles Philippi
- Color process: Technicolor
- Production company: Walt Disney Productions
- Distributed by: RKO Radio Pictures
- Release date: April 2, 1943
- Running time: 7 minutes
- Country: United States
- Language: English

Private Pluto is a 1943 propaganda comedy cartoon produced by Walt Disney Productions. In this cartoon, Pluto is in the army, and he gets antagonized by two chipmunks, later known as Chip 'n' Dale, in their first official appearance. While the chipmunks became regular antagonists of Donald Duck, they did continue to pester Pluto in Squatter's Rights (1946) and one last time in Pluto's Christmas Tree (1952).

This story and characters previously appeared in the October 1942 issue of Walt Disney's Comics and Stories. This was a 4-page text story with illustrations.

== Plot ==
This short showcases Pluto as a military working dog during World War II when he is a guard dog on a U.S. military base. He is told there are saboteurs and is assigned to guard a pillbox (gun emplacement). First, Pluto tries to follow marching orders, contorting himself into quite a mess. Then, he engages in hijinks with two chipmunks who are using a cannon to store and crack their nuts, and a war of wits naturally ensues.

== Voice cast ==
- Pluto: Pinto Colvig
- Chip: Norma Swank
- Dale: Dessie Flynn

== Home media ==
The short was released on May 18, 2004, on Walt Disney Treasures: Walt Disney on the Front Lines and on December 7 of the same year, on Walt Disney Treasures: The Complete Pluto: 1930–1947.
