= The Lone Chipmunks =

- Theatrical release poster
- Directed by: Jack Kinney
- Story by: Dick Kinney; Milt Schaffer
- Produced by: Walt Disney
- Starring: James MacDonald; Dessie Flynn; Billy Bletcher
- Music by: Oliver Wallace
- Animation by: Edwin Aardal; George Nicholas
- Layouts by: Thor Putnam
- Backgrounds by: Dick Anthony
- Color process: Technicolor
- Production company: Walt Disney Productions
- Distributed by: RKO Radio Pictures
- Release date: April 7, 1954
- Running time: 6:23
- Country: United States
- Language: English

The Lone Chipmunks is a 1954 American animated short film directed by Jack Kinney and produced by Walt Disney. In the short film, Chip 'n' Dale are in the Old West, trying to bring in Black Pete for a $10,000 reward, being the only short film that shows a confrontation between Chip 'n' Dale and Pete.

This cartoon marks Pete's final appearance in the Golden Age of American animation, and the last of the three cartoons in the short-lived Chip 'n' Dale series.

== Plot ==
The episode begins with Black Pete entering an Old West town called Gower Gulch guns blazing. He then robs the town's bank and escapes on his horse. The scene then shows Chip 'n' Dale preparing for winter and stashing their acorns in their tree whilst singing "Home on the Range". A wanted poster of Pete with a reward of $10,000 is placed on the hole where Chip goes with some acorns. He then accidentally puts his face in the poster which makes Dale think his friend has turned to crime, but is excited about the money and attempts to turn Chip over to the police, only to see the actual poster.

Pete shows up at his hiding spot and stashes the money in a chest he hid in a tree. The tree the chest is in is also the home of Chip and Dale with their stash of acorns. Pete then makes breakfast while singing "Home on the Range". Seeing the wanted outlaw, they make many attempts to capture him. They try to pull him off with a rock on a rope. Chip is held by Pete which he thinks is a salt shaker making Dale mistake the vibrations as the signal to drop the rock and does so ("Now?" "Not now!"). Chip is suddenly pulled away and the rock tumbling sounds scares Pete, who hides behind another rock and begins firing wildly at nothing.

He brushes it off, then Chip and Dale load a tobacco bag with gunpowder from some of Pete's bullets and turn it into a cigarette. When he hears it crackling, he throws it away and it lands behind the chipmunks and explodes. Pete again panics and fires blindly. He then becomes frantic and decides to move on. He grabs his chest, only to find it full of acorns. He finds his money on the ground in a path, and gathers it while ironically falling into a pit trap, only to find the chipmunks and begins to shoot at them ("If it's trouble you varmints want, I'll give it to you!"). They retreat to their tree, and then attempt to take one of the guns away from Pete.

Chip pulls out the gun but falls due to the weight of the gun. It suddenly begins to fire off out of control. Pete retaliates pulling out his gun, but instead pulls out Dale who was stuck in the holster to which Dale acts like a gun. Chip then points the gun at Pete to which he surrenders. Chip then ironically twirls the gun too fast to which he twirls with it. The gun then goes off again which shoots off his hat and grazes some hair off his head. Pete then tries to sweet-talk his way out which Chip denies ("Sweet talk will get you nowhere"). He spins the chamber of the gun which falls out of the gun disarming it and Pete corners Chip as the cavalry is seen coming toward them with their horns in a few scenes.

Before he can tear Chip apart, Dale grabs one of the spurs on Pete's boots and uses it to trigger the bullets on Pete's belt while Dale lassos him by the leg and breaks his bones. They then make him put his fist on a cactus, Dale then steals his knife and uses it to cut his belt, then they both tie his head with Pete's bandana, then sneak into his shirt and tickle him, while Dale rides the spur down Pete's back which hurts him to the point of charging after him. Chip grabs the frying pan with the eggs and bacon and puts it in the path of Pete which he hits it and is left dazed ("Sunny side up") and then covered in maple syrup and the money he stole. Pete is then captured by the cavalry which they believe to be the work of Chip & Dale, whom they dub "The Lone Chipmunks", and the short ends with Chip and Dale laughing as they and their horse ride off into the distance.

== Voice cast ==
- Billy Bletcher as Black Pete
- Jimmy MacDonald as Chip
- Dessie Flynn as Dale
- Pinto Colvig (additional voices)
- Clarence Nash (additional voices)

== Animation continuity ==
- The animation of Pete robbing the bank and shooting up the town is reused from the 1952 cartoon Two-Gun Goofy.
- The gag with Pete mistaking Dale for his gun was reused in the Chip 'n Dale Rescue Rangers pilot, "To the Rescue".
- The gag with Chip and Dale entering Pete to tickle him was reused in the Chip 'n Dale Rescue Rangers episode, "Throw Mummy from the Train".

== Releases ==
=== Television ===
- Walt Disney anthology series, episode #5.20: "The Adventures of Chip 'n' Dale" (1954)
- Walt Disney's Wonderful World of Color, episode #8.5: "The Hunting Instinct" (1961)
- Disney's Rootin' Tootin' Roundup (1990)
- Donald's Quack Attack, episode #61 (1992)

=== Home media ===
- The Adventures of Chip 'n' Dale (VHS)
- A Tale of Two Chipmunks (VHS)
- Bonus on Davy Crockett 50th anniversary double feature set (DVD)

== See also ==
- Chip 'n' Dale
- Chicken in the Rough (1951)
