= Anne Lloyd =

American singer

for other persons named "Anne Lloyd" see Ann Lloyd (disambiguation)

Anne Lloyd Vincent, known professionally as Anne Lloyd (November 25, 1923 – August 27, 1999) was an American clear-voiced, charismatic singer, best known for her children's records on the Golden Records label.

== Biography ==
Anne Lloyd was born in Teaneck, New Jersey, and her family relocated to Great Cove during the Great Depression. She married her high-school sweetheart, William Vincent, in 1943 and commenced her career singing with the Robert Shaw (conductor) Collegiate Chorale. She was also a featured singer with touring big bands, but as this end of the music business began to fade with the end of World War II, she sought other opportunities. In 1948 she became a staff singer with Arthur Shimkin's newly-established Golden Records label. Lloyd was one of the most prolific singers on the label and was often also featured as part of the Sandpipers, a Mitch Miller-led group that made many records for Golden. Although Lloyd continued to sing after she left Golden Records in the mid-1950s, she did not record after that and considered herself semi-retired. She died of cancer in 1999 in Great Neck, where she and her husband had settled in 1949 after he built a house for them there. Lloyd also recorded for Bell Records.

== Legacy ==
Anne Lloyd made over 100 records for Golden, many of which appeared on its 6-inch subsidiary, Little Golden Records. These discs were an integral part of the life soundtrack of millions of American children during the Eisenhower era. While many celebrity voices were featured on Golden Records, several of the records made by Anne Lloyd may be considered among the most memorable.

== See also ==
- Children's songs
- Nursery Rhymes
