= Mickey's Christmas Carol =

1983 Disney film by Burny Mattinson

- Theatrical release poster
- Directed by: Burny Mattinson
- Story by: Burny Mattinson; Tony L. Marino; Ed Gombert; Don Griffith; Alan Young; Alan Dinehart
- Based on: A Christmas Carol by Charles Dickens Mickey Mouse by Walt Disney; Ub Iwerks
- Produced by: Burny Mattinson
- Starring: Alan Young; Wayne Allwine; Hal Smith; Will Ryan; Clarence Nash; Eddie Carroll; Patricia Parris; Dick Billingsley
- Edited by: James Melton; Armetta Jackson
- Music by: Irwin Kostal
- Animation by: John Lasseter; Glen Keane; Mark Henn; Ed Gombert; Dale Baer; David Block; Randy Cartwright; Patricia Peraza; Kathy Zielinski
- Layouts by: Michael Peraza Jr.; Sylvia Roemer; Gary M. Eggleston
- Backgrounds by: Jim Coleman; Brian Sebern; Kathleen Swain; Tia W. Kratter; Donald A. Towns
- Color process: Technicolor
- Production company: Walt Disney Productions
- Distributed by: Buena Vista Distribution
- Release date: December 16, 1983; (with The Rescuers)
- Running time: 26 minutes
- Country: United States
- Language: English

Mickey's Christmas Carol is a 1983 American animated Christmas fantasy drama featurette, directed and produced by Burny Mattinson. The cartoon is an adaptation of Charles Dickens's 1843 novella A Christmas Carol, and stars Scrooge McDuck as Ebenezer Scrooge. The rest of the cast was filled mostly using characters from pre-existing Disney animated properties; notably from the Mickey Mouse universe, Jiminy Cricket from Pinocchio (1940), The Adventures of Ichabod and Mr. Toad (1949), and Robin Hood (1973).

The featurette was produced by Walt Disney Productions and released by Buena Vista Distribution on December 16, 1983, with the reissue of The Rescuers (1977). In the United States, it first aired on television on NBC, on December 10, 1984.

Mickey's Christmas Carol was largely adapted from the 1974 Disneyland Records audio musical An Adaptation of Dickens' Christmas Carol, featuring similar dialogue and a similar cast of characters. The primary differences between the record album and animated featurette are the collectors for the poor were played by Honest John and Gideon from Pinocchio, the Ghost of Christmas Past was played by Merlin from The Sword in the Stone and the Ghost of Christmas Future was played by the Evil Queen in her peddler disguise from Snow White and the Seven Dwarfs, but in the animated version, the collectors for the poor are played by Ratty and Mole from The Adventures of Ichabod and Mr. Toad, the Ghost of Christmas Past is played by Jiminy Cricket from Pinocchio and the Ghost of Christmas Future is played by Pete. Additionally this film was the last time that Clarence Nash voiced Donald Duck before his death in 1985.

The film was nominated for an Academy Award for Best Animated Short Film in 1984, which it lost to Jimmy Picker's Sundae in New York. It was the first nomination for a Mickey Mouse short since Mickey and the Seal (1948).

== Plot ==
On Christmas Eve, Ebenezer Scrooge (Scrooge McDuck), an angry moneylender in Victorian London who despises Christmas, cannot give money to a panhandler outside his counting house, declines his nephew Fred's (Donald Duck) invitation to Christmas dinner, and uses questionable logic to turn away two gentlemen (Rat and Mole) fundraising aid for the poor. His overworked and underpaid employee, Bob Cratchit (Mickey Mouse), requests to have half of Christmas Day off; Scrooge reluctantly agrees, but without pay. That night, the shackled ghost of his late business partner Jacob Marley (Goofy) appears to Scrooge and warns that three spirits will visit Scrooge during the night, and that he faces a worse fate if he does not change his wicked ways.

Later that night, Scrooge is visited by the Ghost of Christmas Past (Jiminy Cricket), who shows him visions of a past Christmas party hosted by Scrooge's old boss Fezzywig (Mr. Toad), where the young Scrooge fell in love with Isabelle (Daisy Duck). Flashing forward to the counting house, Isabelle mentions buying a honeymoon cottage for when Scrooge agrees to marry, but Scrooge forecloses on the cottage, marking the moment he loved money more than her.

Scrooge next meets the gigantic, merry Ghost of Christmas Present (Willie the Giant), who takes Scrooge to Bob Cratchit's house. Scrooge sees that their Christmas dinner for their family of five consists of barely enough food to feed one person, and becomes especially concerned when he sees Cratchit's ill son Tiny Tim (Morty Mouse).

As Scrooge asks about Tiny Tim's fate, this ghost disappears and the Ghost of Christmas Future (Pete) takes Scrooge to a cemetery in the near future to see the Cratchits mourning Tiny Tim's death. As Scrooge asks the spirit if the events can still be changed, they see two gravediggers (Weasels) remarking how no one came to mourn the man they are burying. After they leave, the Ghost reveals the tombstone bears Scrooge's name, and shoves Scrooge down into the grave while dubbing him "the richest man in the cemetery." Falling into his own coffin which opens to show the flames of Hell, Scrooge vows to change his ways before finding himself in his bedroom on Christmas Day.

Filled with glee, Scrooge begins spreading happiness and joy around London, donating a sizable amount of money to the gentlemen's charity and reconciling with Fred. At the Cratchit house, Scrooge puts up a front acting like his old cruel self, then surprises everyone with gifts of a prize turkey, toys, and giving Cratchit a substantial raise along with making him his business partner, as Tiny Tim declares "God bless us, everyone."

== Cast ==
Opening titles for Mickey's Christmas Carol illustrated by Michael Peraza Jr., in sepia tone with Mickey Mouse as Bob Cratchit.

=== Main cast ===
Voice actor	Character	Role
Alan Young	Scrooge McDuck	Ebenezer Scrooge
Wayne Allwine	Mickey Mouse	Bob Cratchit
Hal Smith	Goofy	Jacob Marley's ghost
Eddie Carroll	Jiminy Cricket	Ghost of Christmas Past
Will Ryan	Willie the Giant	Ghost of Christmas Present
Will Ryan	Pete	Ghost of Christmas Future
Clarence Nash	Donald Duck	Fred, Scrooge's nephew
Patricia Parris	Daisy Duck	Isabelle ("Belle" in the novella)
Dick Billingsley	Morty and Ferdie; Fieldmouse	Tiny Tim
None (characters have no spoken dialogue)	Morty and Ferdie; Fieldmouse	Peter Cratchit
None (characters have no spoken dialogue)	J. Thaddeus Toad	Fezzywig
None (characters have no spoken dialogue)	Minnie Mouse	Emily Cratchit
None (characters have no spoken dialogue)	Millie or Melody Mouse	Martha Cratchit
Hal Smith	Ratty	Collectors for the poor
Will Ryan	Moley	Collectors for the poor
Wayne Allwine	Otto	Beggar
Wayne Allwine and Will Ryan	Weasels	Gravediggers

=== Extras ===
==== Opening street scene ====
- The Big Bad Wolf, collecting for charity (voiced by Will Ryan)
- The Three Little Pigs, caroling

==== Party at Fezzywig's ====
- Lady Kluck, dancing with Secretary Bird
- Rabbit children, clapping
- Uncle Waldo; clapping, later dancing
- Grandma Duck; clapping, later dancing
- Horace Horsecollar, dancing with Clarabelle Cow
- Gus Goose, dancing with Clara Cluck
- Angus MacBadger, dancing
- Chip and Dale, dancing
- Cocky Locky, dancing
- Huey, Dewey, and Louie, decorating Christmas tree
- Percy and Patricia Pigg, dancing

==== Closing street scene ====
- Skippy Bunny and Toby Turtle, playing in the street
- Mother Rabbit and Grandma Owl, standing in the street
- Practical Pig, chasing two of the Three Little Wolves
- Cyril Proudbottom, pulling Donald's cart

The film also includes unidentifiable dog, fox, pig, squirrel, bear, raccoon, goose, and chicken characters. The DVD print reveals that the graveyard scene also includes tombstones containing famous performers, including Gladys Knight & the Pips, Bob Mills, and Warren Oates.

== Musical numbers ==
Multiple musical numbers were featured in the 1974 record and 1982 reissue, but were removed from the film.

1974 Version: Side One:

- "Money" - Scrooge, Cratchit
- "The Way Christmas Ought To Be" - Scrooge, Cratchit
- "Being Tight Is Not Alright" - Marley
- "Under The Mistletoe Pt. 1" - Chorus
- "Under The Mistletoe Pt. 2" - Chorus

Side Two:

- "We Have Love" - Cratchit Family
- "What A Glorious Christmas Morning' - Chorus
- "They Won't Know Me" - Scrooge
- "The Way Christmas Ought To Be (reprise)" - Scrooge, Cratchit, Chorus
- "What A Glorious Christmas Morning (reprise)" - Chorus

1982 Reissue: Side One:

- "Oh, What A Merry Christmas Day" - Chorus

"Money" - Scrooge, Cratchit

- "The Way Christmas Ought To Be" - Scrooge, Cratchit
- "Being Tight Is Not Alright" - Marley
- "Under The Mistletoe" - Chorus

Side Two:

- "We Have Love" - Cratchit Family
- "What A Glorious Christmas Morning" - Chorus
- "The Way Christmas Ought To Be (reprise)" - Scrooge, Cratchit, Chorus
- "What A Glorious Christmas Morning (reprise)" - Chorus

The opening song, "Oh, What A Merry Christmas Day" was made for the cartoon, and appeared as the opening of the reissued record.

Some songs were shortened. "Money" and "We Have Love" have extra verses in the 1974 version that were cut out.

The first part of "Under The Mistletoe' was removed, along with Scrooge's short number, "They Won't Know Me." The reprise to "The Way Christmas Ought To Be" lyrically stays the same, but the keys are different.

== Production ==
This was the first original Mickey Mouse theatrical cartoon produced in over 30 years. With the exception of re-releases, Mickey had not appeared in movie theaters since the short film The Simple Things (1953). The graveyard sequence was also the first time Disney tested the animation photo transfer process. Many additional characters seen in the film had also not appeared in a theatrical cartoon for several decades such as Horace Horsecollar and Clarabelle Cow. The film was also one of the final times Clarence Nash voiced Donald Duck before his death in 1985. Nash was the only original voice actor in the film as Walt Disney (Mickey Mouse) had died in 1966, Pinto Colvig (Goofy) in 1967, Bill Thompson (Scrooge McDuck), Cliff Edwards (Jiminy Cricket) and Billy Gilbert (Willie the Giant) in 1971, and Billy Bletcher (Pete and the Big Bad Wolf) in 1979. It also marked the first time in animation that Scrooge McDuck was voiced by actor Alan Young (who had first voiced the character on the musical album); Young would continue to be the primary voice actor for McDuck, most notably in DuckTales, until the actor's death in 2016.

== Reception ==
On review aggregator website Rotten Tomatoes, the film holds a 100% approval rating with an average rating of 8/10 based on 8 reviews.

Film critic Leonard Maltin said that rather than being "a pale attempt to imitate the past", the film is "cleverly written, well-staged, and animated with real spirit and a sense of fun". Robin Allan stated that the film calls to mind the similarities between Walt Disney and Charles Dickens, in terms of both the work they produced and their work ethic.

However, Gene Siskel and Roger Ebert of At the Movies gave it "two thumbs down" as they were both disappointed. Siskel felt there was not enough emphasis on Mickey's character, in spite of the title, and that it did not rank with most of Disney's full-length animated features. Ebert stated that it lacked the magic of visual animation that the "Disney people are famous for" and that it was a "forced march" through the Charles Dickens story without any ironic spin.

Mickey's Christmas Carol was nominated for an Academy Award as Best Animated Short Subject of 1983, losing to Jimmy Picker's Sundae in New York.

Colin Greenland reviewed Mickey's Christmas Carol for Imagine magazine, and wrote that "it is surprising how entertaining this is, perhaps because it is actually a Scrooge McDuck movie (of course), with the effete rodent very much in a minor role as Bob Cratchit".

In 2019, Robert Keeling of Den of Geek noted as it "not exactly a faithful retelling – surprisingly, the issue of Scrooge's mother and sister dying never comes up – but it's a thoroughly enjoyable and warm festive offering nonetheless".

== Releases ==
Mickey's Christmas Carol premiered in the UK on October 20, 1983, alongside a re-issue of The Jungle Book (1967), and was released in the US on December 16 of the same year, with a Christmas 1983 re-issue of The Rescuers (1977). It has been broadcast on various television stations throughout the years. It started on NBC (1984–1990) with 12 new additional sepia title cards illustrated by Michael Peraza Jr. to match the 12 he had done for the original film to help bridge the segments together. It went on to air on The Disney Channel (1987–1999; 2002–2006), and CBS (1991–1998), occasionally on ABC (2000; 2003) before moving permanently to ABC Family/Freeform (2001–). It was aired on Toon Disney in 2008. The run on ABC Family includes Winnie the Pooh and Christmas Too and was part of their "25 Days of Christmas", but with several abrupt edits including the "Chocolate Pot Roast with Yogurt" line and Marley tripping on the stairs and falling down, letting out a Goofy holler. In Canada, it airs on CBC, and has been aired every Christmas season since 1985. It typically airs the Sunday before Christmas. For many years, the short film would air on CBC as a one-hour program, as mentioned below. In addition, Mickey's Christmas Carol would be shown unmatted. In recent years, however, Mickey's Christmas Carol is only aired in a half-hour time slot and in high definition matted widescreen, presumably to be more suited for modern television screens.

The aforementioned broadcasts in the 1980s and early 1990s spanned a full hour, with the first half consisting of the following older cartoon shorts: Donald's Snow Fight, Pluto's Christmas Tree, and The Art of Skiing. Each of the four items in the program was preceded by a narrative wraparound segment in which one of the Disney cartoon characters (Donald, Pluto (with Mickey translating), Goofy, and Mickey, respectively, all voiced by their original actors from the short) would talk about his favorite Christmas, thus leading into the cartoon in question. From 1988 onwards, The Art of Skiing was excluded from the annual broadcast, replaced at the end of the hour by one segment or another. The 1993 telecast, for example, featured a behind-the-scenes featurette on The Nightmare Before Christmas. Later broadcasts simply reduced the timeslot to half an hour, showing Mickey's Christmas Carol by itself.

A clip of this film in Swedish was shown on Donald Duck's 50th Birthday to illustrate Donald's international appeal.

This short film was featured in Disney's Magical Mirror Starring Mickey Mouse. The shot of Mickey holding Tiny Tim's crutch is also seen in the opening of Epic Mickey.

== Home media ==
The short was released several times on VHS and LaserDisc throughout the 1980s and 1990s. It was released in the Mini-Classics line on September 28, 1989, September 25, 1990 and October 1, 1993. It was re-issued in the Favorite Stories line on October 2, 1996.

The short is also featured, without its opening credits, in the direct-to-home release, Mickey's Magical Christmas: Snowed in at the House of Mouse. It is also available on the ninth volume of the Walt Disney Classic Cartoon Favorites DVD collection, as well as in the Walt Disney Treasures set Mickey Mouse in Living Color – Volume 2; the latter is the only DVD to be released in its theatrical 1.66:1 widescreen aspect ratio, but it is simply cropping the 1.33:1 version. The short is also on the Disney Animation Collection Volume 7 DVD (1.33:1). On November 5, 2013, the 30th Anniversary Edition of this short was released on DVD and for the first time on Blu-ray, but it was further cropped to 1.78:1 widescreen and featured a heavy use of noise reduction. Various other shorts were included in the DVD.

== See also ==
- List of Christmas films
- List of ghost films
- List of A Christmas Carol adaptations
- Mickey Mouse (film series)
- The Muppet Christmas Carol
