= Chip 'n' Dale =

Disney cartoon characters

- Chip 'n' Dale / Mickey Mouse & Friends / Donald Duck character
- Chip (left) and Dale (right)
- First appearance: Private Pluto (1943; 83 years ago)
- Created by: Bill Justice
- Designed by: Bill Justice
- Voiced by: Chip: Nora Corcoran (1943); Jimmy MacDonald (1946–1960); Dessie (Flynn) Miller (1949); John Brown (1949); Anne Lloyd (1950); Norma Swank-Haviland (1951–1956); Mac McLean (1956); Gloria Wood, Robie Lester or Teri York (1972); Phil Baron (1980); Tress MacNeille (1988–present); Matthew Géczy (Chip 'n' Dale: Park Life; 2021–2024); John Mulaney (Chip 'n Dale: Rescue Rangers; 2022); Mason Blomberg (Chip 'n Dale: Rescue Rangers; young 2022); Jan Johns (Mickey Mouse Funhouse; 2022–2025); Dale: Nora Corcoran (1943); Milt Neil (1946); Dessie (Flynn) Miller (1948–1960); John Brown (1949); Anne Lloyd (1950); Helen Silbert (1956); Robie Lester (1960–1984); Will Ryan (1980); Corey Burton (1988–present); Tress MacNeille (1999–2006); Kaycie Chase (Chip 'n' Dale: Park Life; 2021–2024); Andy Samberg (Chip 'n Dale: Rescue Rangers; 2022); Juliet Donenfeld (Chip 'n Dale: Rescue Rangers; young 2022)
- Developed by: Jack Hannah; Bill Peet; Gerry Geronimi; Walt Disney

In-universe information
- Aliases: The Lone Chipmunks; The Rescue Rangers
- Species: Chipmunks
- Gender: Both male
- Significant others: Clarice (Two Chips and a Miss); Gadget Hackwrench (Chip 'n Dale: Rescue Rangers)
- Rival(s): Donald Duck; Pluto; Pete; Fat Cat

Chip and Dale, also spelled Chip 'n' Dale, are American cartoon anthropomorphic chipmunks created by The Walt Disney Company, who debuted in the 1943 short film Private Pluto.

== Concept ==
The characters were first drawn by Bill Justice, and named after furniture designer Thomas Chippendale. They were introduced in the 1943 Pluto short Private Pluto, directed by Clyde Geronimi. In the short, they fight with Pluto about whether they can store their nuts in a military base cannon. Director Jack Hannah decided to use them as co-stars in Donald Duck shorts. Hannah said:

I believe Gerry Geronimi did a picture with two impish little chipmunks that just squeaked and chattered with a speeded-up soundtrack but no words. He used them with Pluto… I wanted to use them with the Duck but with a little more personality in them. So we decided to put words into their mouths but speed 'em up so you could just barely understand them… We gave them both the same personality—but something was missing. Bill Peet came up with the suggestion of making one of them a little goofball to give them two different personalities. Immediately I saw the advantage of that and took the suggestion.

While it took three years for Chip 'n' Dale to actually appear in a completed Donald Duck cartoon from Hannah—Chip an' Dale (1947)—it was not for want of trying; following Private Pluto in production was "Nuts" (in production 1942), a shelved cartoon that would have pitted the chipmunks against Donald much sooner. Some gags from the unfinished short—the staff of which included Carl Barks and Harry Reeves—later made it into the completed Chip 'n' Dale cartoons Winter Storage (1949) and Trailer Horn (1950).

Of the two, Chip is portrayed as being safe, focused, and having a mind for logical scheming. Dale, by contrast, is more laid-back, dim-witted, and impulsive, and has a very strong sense of humor. Originally the two had a similar appearance, but as a way to tell them apart, some differences were introduced: Chip has a small black nose and two centered protruding teeth, whereas Dale has a large dark red nose and a prominent gap between his front teeth. Chip is also depicted as having smooth hair on top of his head while Dale's tends to be ruffled.

In most cartoons, they are paired with Mickey Mouse, or most often, Pluto and Donald Duck, whom they usually battle when they see an activity they do out of curiosity or when they try to get food without getting caught by them. They were given their own series in the 1950s, but only three cartoons resulted under their name: Chicken in the Rough (1951), Two Chips and a Miss (1952) and The Lone Chipmunks (1954). The duo was nominated for the Academy Award for Best Animated Short Film three times in four years: in 1946 for Squatter's Rights (against Mickey and Pluto), in 1947 for Chip an' Dale and in 1949 for Toy Tinkers (both against Donald Duck). In the 1980s, they became the lead characters of a half-hour television series, Chip 'n Dale: Rescue Rangers, in which they have adventures as leaders of a detective agency.

== List of Chip 'n' Dale shorts ==
Chip and Dale appear in the following 23 animated short films.

Chip 'n' Dale short
Donald Duck short
Mickey Mouse short
Pluto short

#	Title	Release date	Author	Summary
1	Private Pluto	April 2, 1943	Clyde Geronimi	Private Pluto has been assigned to guard a pillbox from saboteurs. But, Chip and Dale are the saboteurs who occupy it, while using the cannon to crack acorns on Pluto's head. In the end, the chipmunks fire Pluto out of the cannon and crack the remaining acorns, leaving him to whine.
2	Squatter's Rights	June 7, 1946	Jack Hannah	In a house, Chip and Dale inhabit a stove when Mickey and Pluto return and get in their way. Determined to keep their home, Chip and Dale get Pluto in trouble with Mickey. The chipmunks manage to drive the two out after they make Pluto seem like he was shot badly.
3	Chip an' Dale	November 28, 1947	Jack Hannah	Being cold and lacking wood, Donald heads off to chop down a tree which happens to be inhabited by Chip and Dale. Chip and Dale try to get him out of luck by stealing his firewood, causing Donald to kick them out. In the end, they roll a giant snowball on him.
4	Three for Breakfast	November 5, 1948	Jack Hannah	When Chip and Dale catch sight of Donald's pancakes, they decide to steal them from Donald. Donald protects his breakfast by tricking them with a rubber cement pancake. Soon, Chip and Dale get Donald into a long stretch with the rubber pancake jamming him in the chimney.
5	Winter Storage	June 3, 1949	Jack Hannah	Chip and Dale try to store acorns for the coming winter but run out on their tree. The chipmunks swipe Donald's acorns he is using for a seeding project, getting trapped in Donald's box trap and then get into a squabble. Chip and Dale challenge Donald in a game of hockey with the acorns and overwhelm him with a huge pile of acorns.
6	All in a Nutshell	September 2, 1949	Jack Hannah	Donald has run out of nuts for his nut butter sales and gets some out of Chip and Dale's tree. The chipmunks think Donald's stall is a giant walnut. Dale injures Chip in his clumsy attempts but the two both break into Donald's store and find nut butter tastes good. They swipe Donald's jars and after a chase dispose of Donald, they shoot him into the lake.
7	Toy Tinkers	December 16, 1949	Jack Hannah	Donald chops down a pine tree, to set as his Christmas tree. Chip and Dale follow him to his house, and steal Donald's nut supply, with the use of his toys. Donald sets to protect it all, tricking them with a Father Christmas guise trap drawing a pistol at them. Donald and the chipmunks engage in a toy gun war until Donald gets blown with a firework.
8	Crazy Over Daisy	March 25, 1950	Jack Hannah	Chip and Dale antagonize Donald Duck, as he attempts to deliver a present to Daisy, even managing to destroy his penny-farthing. Donald forces the chipmunks to transport him and Daisy, who, outraged with the way Donald treated the chipmunks, dumps him.
9	Trailer Horn	April 28, 1950	Jack Hannah	Chip and Dale follow a trail of footprints to Donald's campsite, and honk the car's horn to cause trouble and wake Donald up. The chipmunks then harass Donald by preventing him from trying to swim. The chipmunks pelt Donald with pine cones. Donald tries to get at them with his car but totals it.
10	Food for Feudin'	August 11, 1950	Charles Nicholas	Chip and Dale gather hazelnuts, but Pluto buries a bone in the tree and loses all the nuts in his dog house. Chip and Dale camouflage themselves in gardening gloves and lure Pluto to their tree, retrieving their nuts. The chipmunks and Pluto play a Plam Pile game getting their fingers tied.
11	Out on a Limb	December 15, 1950	Jack Hannah	Donald works as a tree surgeon, and notices Chip and Dale storing nuts and prunes their branch. Donald tails the chipmunks with a branch cutter but they knock Donald with a stone. Donald chases the chipmunks, getting their crowns shaved with a lawnmower, but runs into an electric line.
12	Chicken in the Rough	January 19, 1951	Jack Hannah	Chip and Dale drop their acorns in a chicken farm and go in after them. In the henhouse, Dale mistakes the eggs for walnuts. He meets a hatched chick and is forced to impersonate a chick to hide from the cockerel, his cover almost blown and staying stuck in the nest.
13	Corn Chips	March 23, 1951	Jack Hannah	Donald clears the snow from his yard, and Chip and Dale clears theirs into his yard, angering him. The chipmunks then enter Donald's house to get hold of some of his popcorn, but get mixed in his popcorn when Donald comes back. Chip and Dale swipe Donald's popcorn and he tries to get it back. After a chase, Donald lights a fire in the tree and the chipmunks fill Donald's yard with popcorn.
14	Test Pilot Donald	June 8, 1951	Jack Hannah	Donald tries out his control line model airplane finding it works fine. When it gets caught in a tree, Dale hitches a ride in it to Chip's disapproval. When Dale crash lands, Donald traps him in a jar, but he escapes and drives the plane again. Donald tries to catch Dale with a fishing rod, but Dale traps him with the plane on a building spire.
15	Out of Scale	November 2, 1951	Jack Hannah	Donald is having fun with his small train set but removes Chip and Dale's tree after declaring it "out of scale". As the chipmunks try to get their tree back, Donald chases them. The chipmunks make themselves comfy in a miniature house. Donald finds their scale fits with the house and torments them with weather changes. Chip and Dale retrieve their tree and make it fit to scale as a giant redwood tree. This episode is unique because it is a take on Walt Disney's backyard railroad: the Carolwood Pacific. The engine is modeled after the Lille Belle, his live steam engine and Canyonville was one of the towns the Carolwood Pacific Railroad serviced in Walt's back yard.
16	Donald Applecore	January 8, 1952	Jack Hannah	Donald is annoyed Chip and Dale are replacing his apples with eaten cores and Dale tricks him into disposing of them. They resist Donald's insect powder and Donald takes back the apples with his helicopter. The chipmunks empty the apple silo and Donald goes after them with chemical bombs, but gets blown underground to China.
17	Two Chips and a Miss	March 21, 1952	Jack Hannah	In New York, Chip goes for his secret date with Clarice. Dale himself has also been invited to meet Clarice. When they cross each other at the Acorn Club they bicker and fight for Clarice's love and affection. They stop to watch her act. The chipmunks compete for Clarice with their music, both receiving a kiss and all three sing together.
18	Pluto's Christmas Tree	November 21, 1952	Jack Hannah	Chip and Dale tease Pluto and hide in a pine tree which Mickey is chopping down for Christmas. In Mickey's house, Chip and Dale are fascinated by the sparkling balls. They try to get the candy canes but Pluto spots them. After Chip and Dale have a long and mischievous tackle with Pluto, the tree gets destroyed, but Mickey is delighted to have the chipmunks. Donald, Goofy and Minnie come to greet Mickey with carols.
19	Working for Peanuts	November 11, 1953	Jack Hannah	Chip and Dale come across a peanut - and check out the zoo which hosts Dolores the elephant, and all those peanuts. Dolores however prevents the chipmunks getting any. As Dolores's handler, Donald chases them after they thwack Dolores. Chip and Dale attract some people to get some peanuts, then cover themselves in whitewash and trick Donald into thinking they are albino chipmunks.
20	The Lone Chipmunks	April 19, 1954	Jack Kinney	Black Pete is wanted for terrorising and robbing towns. Chip and Dale find Pete has been stashing stolen money in their tree and take the opportunity for the reward. They fail to get Pete twice and he finds them and shoots at them. Chip and Dale put up a tricking fight with Pete and get him captured by the cavalry. Chip and Dale ride off to town known as the Lone Chipmunks.
21	Dragon Around	July 16, 1954	Jack Hannah	Dale is fascinated by medieval fantasy and drags Chip into it when they spot a dragon which is actually Donald's refuse tractor. Donald is intent on building a freeway through their tree. Chip as a knight and Dale as his stead get swallowed by the tractor grabber but they escape and disable its teeth. Before Donald can smash the tree the chipmunks sabotage the tractor. Donald tries to blow them up with dynamite but they blast him in the sky instead.
22	Up a Tree	June 3, 1955	Jack Hannah	Donald is a lumberjack intending to saw a tall tree, which happen to be inhabited by Chip and Dale. Chip causes Donald to fall three times before he cuts off the top and finds out about the two. Donald cuts down the tree and the chipmunks fail to keep it standing. Chip and Dale get Donald in a run from the logged tree until it is catapulted with dynamite along with Donald's house.
23	Chips Ahoy	February 24, 1956	Jack Kinney	Chip and Dale spot an island with abundant acorns but have no way to get to it. They steal Donald's ship in a bottle to get there, with Chip as captain and Dale as a sailor. Donald tries many ways to stop them and get his boat back, until he ends up stuck there, and the chipmunks are accidentally pushed back home. While the chipmunks enjoy their acorns, Donald tries to build a dugout canoe.

== Home media ==
- The Adventures of Chip 'n' Dale – Includes Two Chips and a Miss, Chicken in the Rough, Chips Ahoy, Donald Applecore, Up a Tree, and The Lone Chipmunks plus various song scenes in between cartoon shorts sung by Chip and Dale.
- Classic Cartoon Favorites, Vol. 4: Starring Chip 'n' Dale (DVD)– Includes Chicken in the Rough, Chip an' Dale, Out of Scale, Two Chips and a Miss, Food for Feudin', Working for Peanuts, Out on a Limb, Three for Breakfast and Dragon Around.
- Nuts About Chip 'n' Dale – Includes Food for Feudin', Trailer Horn and Two Chips and a Miss.
- A Tale of Two Chipmunks – Includes Chicken in the Rough, Chips Ahoy and The Lone Chipmunks (Also released on LaserDisc as a double feature along with "The Unsinkable Donald Duck").
- Disney Cartoon Classics Vol. 9: Starring Chip 'n' Dale – Includes Working for Peanuts, Donald Applecore and Dragon Around plus short scenes in between the cartoon shorts narrated by Jiminy Cricket, and is the only animation where Donald addresses the chipmunks by their names.

== Comics series ==
Chip and Dale also had their own comic book title, first from Dell Comics with Four Color Comics #517, 581, and 636, then their own title, Chip 'n' Dale, for issues #4–30 (1955–62), which was then continued by Gold Key Comics with #1–64 (1967–80), and later under its brand Whitman with #65–83 (1980–84).

== TV series ==
=== Chip 'n Dale: Rescue Rangers ===
In 1989, Chip and Dale became the title characters in a new animated television series, Chip 'n Dale: Rescue Rangers, in which they formed a detective agency with new characters created for the show: female mouse inventor Gadget Hackwrench, muscular adventuring Australian mouse Monterey Jack and Zipper the fly. While in the original shorts, the duo is frequent troublemakers who are concerned only with themselves, in Rescue Rangers, they are crime fighters who help the less fortunate.

In this series, the personality differences between the two are more pronounced, with Chip as the serious, heroic leader and Dale as the quick-witted, hard-partying reluctant hero. Additionally, they wear clothes in this series which reflect their personalities; Chip wears a leather jacket and fedora (much like Indiana Jones), while Dale wears a Hawaiian shirt (much like Magnum, P.I.).

=== DuckTales ===
Chip and Dale, based on their Rescue Rangers iterations, made an appearance in the 2017 TV series DuckTales. Making their debut in the season 3 episode, "Double-O-Duck in You Only Crash Twice!", Chip and Dale are depicted as ordinary chipmunks used as lab rats for an intelligence ray developed by the organization F.O.W.L. After becoming much smarter and anthropomorphic, they teamed up with two mice and a fly to escape their confines as well as help Launchpad McQuack defeat one of F.O.W.L.'s agents. They also make a cameo appearance alongside the other Rangers in the series finale, "The Last Adventure!".

=== Chip 'N Dale's Nutty Tales ===
Chip 'n Dale star in a CGI preschool short series, spin-off of Mickey Mouse Mixed-Up Adventures.

=== Chip 'n' Dale: Park Life ===
The characters have a French-American animated series called Chip 'n' Dale: Park Life, which was released on Disney+ on July 28, 2021, which was co-produced by The Walt Disney Company France and Xilam Animation. Unlike other iterations of the characters, the series is non-verbal, similarly to other shows produced by Xilam. The series portrays Chip and Dale's adventures living in a park where they often interact with Clarice, Donald Duck, Pluto, and other mostly Duckburg-centric Disney characters. The chipmunks are portrayed in only semi-humanized form, much as in late-1940s cartoon shorts.

== Film ==
A hybrid live-action/animated film, Chip 'n Dale: Rescue Rangers, was released on May 16, 2022, with animation of the characters provided by Moving Picture Company and their voices by John Mulaney and Andy Samberg. The film was released as a Disney+ original.

== Other appearances ==
Chip and Dale were planned to appear as a cameo in the 1988 film Who Framed Roger Rabbit, but were cut from the final film.

Chip and Dale also make a brief appearance in the Disney classic in Fun and Fancy Free during the Bongo segment of the film.

Chip and Dale make minor appearances in Mickey's Christmas Carol, Mickey Mouse Works, and House of Mouse.

Chip and Dale appear as supporting characters in the Kingdom Hearts video game series. Introduced in Kingdom Hearts (2002), they make subsequent appearances in Kingdom Hearts II (2005), Kingdom Hearts Coded (2008), Kingdom Hearts Birth by Sleep (2010), and Kingdom Hearts III (2019). In the Kingdom Hearts universe, Chip and Dale are depicted as the engineers of the Gummi Ship and the Gummiphone, which can traverse between worlds and communicate across them, respectively.

Chip and Dale are part of the Walt Disney Animation Studios characters that take a group photo at the end of the 2023 short film Once Upon a Studio. They also appear during the end credits along with Spike the Bee, another recurring rival of Donald Duck.

Chip and Dale have appeared multiple times in the Disney Channel short-series Chibi Tiny Tales in their Rescue Rangers outfits on the shorts "Happy Birthday Disney Channel", "Arch-Enemy Day-Off" and "Kiff 'N Dale". According to writer Benjamin Siemon, they are the only characters from the Mickey and Friends franchise to be allowed to be part of the Chibiverse crossover series.

== Voice actors ==
The classic voices of Chip and Dale were mostly provided by Jimmy MacDonald, Dessie (Flynn) Miller, and Helen Silbert. The earliest voices were provided by female office staff, without credit. In Private Pluto, their voices were created by speeding-up sound clips of normal speech. In a number of the shorts that followed, many of these same sound clips were used again, though later shorts used dialogue specifically recorded for that short.

At one point in Winter Storage, Chip and Dale get into an argument while being caught in a trap. When the scene switches to an outside view of the box, the dialogue heard is a sped-up segment of John Brown's narration from the Goofy short A Knight for a Day.

Since 1988, Chip and Dale have been voiced by Tress MacNeille and Corey Burton respectively, although MacNeille has provided the voice for both in Mickey Mouse Works and House of Mouse. John Mulaney and Andy Samberg voiced the two in the Chip 'n Dale: Rescue Rangers live-action film. In the film, the high-pitched voices of the television series were explained as an act by the otherwise normally speaking chipmunks.

== See also ==
- Complete list of Disney animated shorts
- Goofy Gophers
