= Squatter's Rights =

1946 Mickey Mouse cartoon

- Theatrical release poster
- Directed by: Jack Hannah
- Story by: Rex Cox; Harry Reeves
- Produced by: Walt Disney
- Starring: Pinto Colvig; Walt Disney; Dessie Flynn; Jimmy MacDonald
- Music by: Oliver Wallace
- Animation by: Bob Carlson; Rex Cox; Hugh Fraser; Blaine Gibson; Murray McClellan; Paul Murry; Marvin Woodward
- Layouts by: Yale Gracey
- Backgrounds by: Richard H. Thomas
- Color process: Technicolor
- Production company: Walt Disney Productions
- Distributed by: RKO Radio Pictures
- Release date: June 7, 1946
- Running time: 7 minutes
- Country: United States
- Language: English

Squatter's Rights is a 1946 animated short film produced in Technicolor by Walt Disney Productions. The cartoon is about a confrontation between Pluto and Chip and Dale who have taken up residence in Mickey Mouse's hunting shack. It was the 119th short in the Mickey Mouse film series to be released, and the only one produced that year.

The film was directed by Jack Hannah and features the voices of Dessie Flynn as Chip and Dale, and Pinto Colvig as Pluto. Mickey Mouse was voiced by both Walt Disney and Jimmy MacDonald, the latter making his debut as Mickey, and would go on to provide Mickey's voice for over 30 years. It was also Mickey's first post-war appearance. Some scenes featured recycled Mickey Mouse animation from the 1939 short The Pointer, with new animation for Mickey almost entirely provided by Paul Murry, who is now largely known for his time as a Disney comic book artist.

Squatter's Rights was released to theaters on June 7, 1946 by RKO Radio Pictures. In 1947, it was nominated for an Academy Award for Best Animated Short Film at the 19th Academy Awards, but ultimately lost to The Cat Concerto, an MGM Tom and Jerry cartoon, which shared one of 7 Oscars for the Tom and Jerry series.

== Plot ==
The chipmunks Chip 'n' Dale wake up one winter morning inside the wood stove they have made their home. The stove is located in Mickey Mouse's hunting shack which appears to be unoccupied. Soon after, Mickey and Pluto arrive for the hunting season.

Pluto soon discovers that the chipmunks are in the stove, and helps Mickey build a fire to smoke them out. Chip and Dale realize what is happening and manage to blow out Mickey's matches. From a hiding place underneath the stove, the chipmunks take a match and burns Mickey's foot with it. Mickey assumes that Pluto is to blame and scolds him.

After Mickey leaves to get more wood, Pluto chases Chip and Dale around the room, across a table, and onto a mantel above the fireplace. Pluto accidentally gets his nose stuck in the muzzle of Mickey's rifle which is hanging over the fireplace. As Pluto tries to pull his nose free, he finds that the rifle is getting closer to going off in his face. Gradually the table which Pluto is standing on with his hind paws starts to slide back. Pluto falls and therefore causes the rifle to fire, which luckily misses him. He lands on the floor, with the rifle landing on his head and arm, momentarily knocking him unconscious. Chip and Dale then come and pour ketchup on him so that it would look like he is bleeding.

Mickey returns having heard the gunshot, and he's horrified to see Pluto apparently gravely wounded. Pluto wakes up however and at first starts to comfort Mickey, but when he sees the ketchup, he starts to panic thinking it is his blood. Mickey hurriedly carries him off to find help, and Chip and Dale rejoice over regaining ownership of the property.

== Voice actors ==
- Mickey Mouse: Walt Disney
- Pluto: Pinto Colvig
- Chip: Jimmy MacDonald
- Dale: Dessie Flynn

== Production ==
Production for Squatter's Rights began in the spring of 1944, and finished by January 1946 upon the completion of the short film's Technicolor photography.

== Releases ==
- 1946 - theatrical release
- 1955 - Disneyland, episode #2.5: "Adventures of Mickey Mouse" (TV)
- 1975 - "Walt Disney's Cartoon Carousel" (TV)
- c. 1992 - Mickey's Mouse Tracks, episode #72 (TV)
- 1997 - The Ink and Paint Club, episode #1.5: "Chip 'n' Dale" (TV)

== Home media ==
The short was released on December 7, 2004 on Walt Disney Treasures: The Complete Pluto: 1930-1947.

Additional releases include:

- 1984 - "Cartoon Classics: More of Disney's Best 1932-1946" (VHS)
- 2010 - iTunes (digital download)

== See also ==
- Mickey Mouse (film series)
