= Volus Jones =

American animator (1913–2004)

- Born: November 17, 1913
- Died: May 3, 2004 (aged 90); Fort Worth, Texas
- Occupation: Animator
- Years active: 1937-1996
- Employer(s): Walt Disney Productions (1937-1941, 1947-1956); Screen Gems (1941-1946); Jack Kinney Productions (1960-1963); Warner Bros.-Seven Arts (1967-1969); Walter Lantz Productions (1969-1972); Hanna-Barbera (1969-1981)

Volus Carson Jones (November 17, 1913 – May 3, 2004) was an American animator. He was best known for his work at the Disney cartoon studio, but amassed credits at numerous other studios during the Golden age of American animation, including Walt Disney Productions, Screen Gems and Warner Bros.-Seven Arts.

== Career ==
Jones started his career at Disney, first as an in-between artist before graduating to full animator status in the late 1930s. During his time at the studio he became something of a specialist in animating Donald Duck, earning him the nickname "The Duck Man" from his colleagues. He was one of the many animators that took part in the Disney animators' strike of 1941, eventually moving to Columbia Pictures' animation studio Screen Gems. Although unlike a number of his colleagues, he returned to the studio for some time afterwards, eventually leaving the company in 1956.

He spent the next few years working at various studios, and had a spell as an animation director on the early-1960s Popeye, working under former Disney colleague Jack Kinney. In 1967 he arrived at the newly re-opened Warner Bros. animation studio, but left along with director Alex Lovy the following year, and followed Lovy to the Hanna-Barbera studios. After three years at Hanna-Barbera, Jones went to work for Walter Lantz Productions, but left after just a year when the studio shut down production for good in 1972.

Following the closure of Lantz's studio, Jones worked as a freelancer for the remainder of his career. The vast majority of his work was for his previous employers, Hanna-Barbera, but he also animated on the films Heavy Traffic and The Nine Lives of Fritz the Cat. His last screen credit was as a director on Challenge of the GoBots in 1985.
