= Bill Justice =

American animator (1914–2011)

- Born: William Barnard Justice; February 9, 1914; Dayton, Ohio, U.S.
- Died: February 10, 2011 (aged 97); Santa Monica, California, U.S.
- Education: The Herron School of Art and Design
- Occupations: Disney animator and Imagineer
- Years active: 1937–1979
- Notable work: Chip 'n' Dale

William Barnard Justice (February 9, 1914 – February 10, 2011) was an American animator and Imagineer for the Walt Disney Company. He was a graduate of the Herron School of Art and Design in Indianapolis.

== Biography ==
Justice joined Walt Disney Studios as an animator in 1937 and worked on such features as Fantasia, The Three Caballeros, Alice in Wonderland, and Peter Pan. He is arguably best known as the animator of the rabbit Thumper from Bambi and chipmunks Chip 'n' Dale. He was the director of The Truth About Mother Goose, Noah's Ark, and A Symposium On Popular Songs, all of which were nominated for Academy Awards as Best Short Subject, Cartoon. In total, Justice worked on 57 shorts and 19 features.

In 1960, Justice started redesigning and making new Disney character costumes for Disneyland, and later for the other Disney parks and resorts.

In 1965, Justice joined Walt Disney Imagineering, where he programmed figures for several Disney attractions such as Pirates of the Caribbean, the Haunted Mansion and Country Bear Jamboree.

Justice retired from the Disney Company in 1979 and was named a Disney Legend in 1996. He is the author of Justice for Disney, which chronicles his years with the company.

Justice died of natural causes at a nursing home in Santa Monica, California, one day after his 97th birthday.
