= Good Morning, Mickey! =

American animated television series

- Country of origin: United States
- Original language: English
- No. of episodes: 80

Production
- Running time: 22 minutes
- Production company: Walt Disney Productions

Original release
- Network: Disney Channel
- Release: April 18, 1983 – November 28, 1992

Related
- The Mouse Factory; Mickey's Mouse Tracks; Donald Duck Presents

Good Morning, Mickey! is an American animated television series produced by Walt Disney Productions. It was first aired on April 18, 1983 when Disney Channel was launched. It was one of the Disney Channel's first original programs, and the first program to air at the channel's launch. It featured Disney animated shorts. Although Mickey Mouse shorts were the primary programming, additional cartoons featuring Goofy, Donald Duck, Chip 'n' Dale, Pluto, and others were also shown. Its time-slot for its early run was at 7 a.m. Eastern/Pacific Time, making it the first program of The Disney Channel's 16 (later 18) hour programming day. Later on, its time-slot was changed to 7:30 a.m. ET/PT, making it the second program of the channel's programming day. A similar show that premiered later on The Disney Channel was Donald Duck Presents. Good Morning, Mickey! was replaced by Mickey's Mouse Tracks in 1992.

== Episode list ==
#	Title 1	Title 2	Title 3	Title 4
001	The Simple Things	Boat Builders	Three Little Pigs	The Big Bad Wolf
002	On Ice	Camp Dog	Donald's Better Self	How to Dance
003	The Whalers	Pluto and the Gopher	The Band Concert	Tortoise and the Hare
004	Thru The Mirror	Pluto's Sweater	The Country Cousin	Donald's Diary
005	Mickey's Circus	Rescue Dog	The Ugly Duckling	Tennis Racquet
006	Moose Hunters	Cold Storage	Pluto's Judgement Day	How to Have an Accident in the Home
007	Mickey's Parrot	Lend a Paw	Donald's Vacation	How to Sleep
008	Three Little Wolves	Mickey's Garden	Pluto's Heart Throb	Goofy Gymnastics
009	The Pointer	Mickey's Polo Team	Window Cleaners	Donald's Nephews
010	Symphony Hour	Bone Trouble	Fire Chief	Don Donald
011	Donald's Golf Game	Mail Dog	Good Scouts	Motor Mania
012	Lonesome Ghosts	Wonder Dog	Steamboat Willie	How to Ride a Horse
013	Mickey's Trailer	Pests of the West	The Hockey Champ	Chip an' Dale
014	Hawaiian Holiday	Sheep Dog	Donald's Lucky Day	Trailer Horn
015	The Clock Watcher	Cold Turkey	Modern Inventions	Californy 'er Bust
016	Mickey's Birthday Party	Pluto's Playmate	Honey Harvester	The New Neighbor
017	Moving Day	Pluto and the Zoo	Rugged Bear	A Knight for a Day
018	Orphan's Benefit	Plutopia	Bee on Guard	Beezy Bear
019	Once Upon a Wintertime	Bone Bandit	Wet Paint	Hockey Homicide
020	Mickey's Delayed Date	Pluto's Purchase	Sea Scouts	Pioneer Days
021	Brave Little Tailor	The Purloined Pup	Daddy Duck	Father's Day Off
022	The Worm Turns	Cat Nap Pluto	Self Control	How to Play Baseball
023	A Gentleman's Gentleman	Baggage Buster	Canvas Back Duck	The Cactus Kid
024	Canine Caddy	The Flying Jalopy	They're Off	Donald Duck and the Gorilla
025	Pluto and the Armadillo	The Flying Squirrel	Double Dribble	Donald's Ostrich
026	The Autograph Hound	Primitive Pluto	Let's Stick Together	The Klondike kid
027	Donald's Off Day	Puss Cafe	Hello Aloha	Cured Duck
028	Squatter's Rights	Golden Eggs	Plane Crazy	Dumb Bell of the Yukon
029	Food for Feudin'	Old Sequoia	The Mail Pilot	Drip Dippy Donald
030	Billposters	In Dutch	Lambert the Sheepish Lion	Donald's Double Trouble
031	The Nifty Nineties	Working for Peanuts	The Olympic Champ	The Trial of Donald Duck
032	The Brave Engineer	Donald's Dream Voice	Shanghaied	Soup's On
033	Mickey's Fire Brigade	Slide, Donald, Slide	Building a Building	Out on a Limb
034	Corn Chips	Lion Down	Pluto's Party	Grand Canyonscope
035	Three Blind Mouseketeers	Donald's Snow Fight	Two Weeks Vacation	Crazy Over Daisy
036	Morris the Midget Moose	Sea Salts	Touchdown Mickey	Donald's Tire Trouble
037	Bath Day	Donald's Garden	Pluto's Fledgling	Lucky Number
038	Magician Mickey	Sleepy Time Donald	Hooked Bear	Donald's Dog Laundry
039	Springtime for Pluto	Crazy with the Heat	The Grasshoper and the Ants	No Hunting
040	Bubble Bee	Toy Tinkers	Mickey's Steam Roller	Inferior Decorator
041	Pluto's Surprise Package	Foul Hunting	Pigs is Pigs	Hook, Lion and Sinker
042	Mother Pluto	The Skeleton Dance	The Dognapper	Donald's Dilemma
043	The Nifty Nineties	Truant Officer Donald	Pluto's Kid Brother	Beach Picnic
044	Legend of Coyote Rock	The Plastics Inventor	Ye Olden Days	Trombone Trouble
045	Dog Watch	The Greener Yard	The Pied Piper	Spare the Rod
046	Social Lion	Donald and Pluto	In the Bag	Teachers are People
047	Mickey's Rival	Lighthouse Keeping	Home Made Home	Lonesome Ghosts (second edition of this short in the series)
048	Mickey's Amateurs	Father's Lion	Blue Rhythm	Polar Trappers
049	The Little Whirlwind	Chef Donald	T-Bone for Two	Wild Waves
050	Woodland Cafe	Mickey Down Under	Old MacDonald Duck	Pueblo Pluto
051	Mr. Mouse Takes a Trip	Put-Put Troubles	Ferdinand the Bull	The Gallopin' Gaucho
052	Tugboat Mickey	Uncle Donald's Ants	Canine Patrol	Timber
053	Alpine Climbers	Bellboy Donald	The Delivery Boy	Grin and Bear It
054	Pluto, Junior	Duck Pimples	The Beach Party	Tea for Two Hundred
055	R'coon Dawg	Donald's Happy Birthday	Mickey in Arabia	Early to Bed
056	Clock Cleaners	Chicken Little	Hold That Pose	Bootle Beetle
057	Mickey's Grand Opera	The Riveter	The Sleepwalker	Donald's Gold Mine
058	Pluto's Blue Note	Donald's Cousin Gus	The Pet Store	Tiger Trouble
059	First Aiders	Donald in Mathmagic Land	Goofy and Wilbur	Inferior Decorator (Second edition of this short in the series)
060	Society Dog Show	Clown of the Jungle	How to Play Golf	A Good Time for a Dime
061	Pluto's Housewarming	No Sail	How to Be a Detective	Mr. Duck Steps Out
062	Mickey's Service Station	Goofy's Glider	Figaro and Frankie	Wide Open Spaces
063	Straight Shooters	Fathers are People	Donald's Crime	Mickey's Kangaroo
064	The Eye Have It	How to Swim	A Cowboy Needs a Horse	Victory Vehicles
065	Canine Casanova	Officer Duck	Trick or Treat	How to Fish
066	The Practical Pig	The Art of Self Defense	Test Pilot Donald	Man's Best Friend
067	Lion Around	Father Noah's Ark	Tomorrow We Diet	Private Pluto
068	How to Play Football	Don's Fountain of Youth	Dude Duck	Two-Gun Goofy
069	Little Toot	Donald's Double Trouble	Cold War	Donald's Diary
070	The Army Mascot	Old King Cole	Two Gun Mickey	African Diary
071	Aquamania	Peter and the Wolf	The Fox Hunt	Wide Open Spaces
072	Uncle Donald's Ants (second edition of this short in the series)	Cannibal Capers	Bee at the Beach	The New Neighbor (second edition of this short in the series)
073	Donald's Penguin	Casey at the Bat (Segment of Make Mine Music)	Orphan's Picnic	Little Hiawatha
074	Paul Bunyan	The Flying Gauchito (Segment of The Three Caballeros)	Frank Duck Brings 'em Back Alive	
075	Susie the Little Blue Coupe	Pluto's Christmas Tree	Lake Titicaca (Segment of Saludos Amigos)	Donald's Snow Fight
076	Mickey and the Beanstalk	Pluto's Quin-Puplets	Sky Trooper	Donald's Penguin
077	Mickey's Elephant	Mickey and the Seal	Out of Scale	Three for Breakfast
078	Donald Applecore	The Big Wash	Dragon Around	The Art of Skiing
079	Winter Storage	Elmer Elephant	Chicken in The Rough	Chips Ahoy
080	Up a Tree	Two Chips and a Miss	All in a Nutshell	The Lone Chipmunks

== Home media ==
This show was released on VHS in the UK as part of a six-volume set which also each featured an episode of Welcome to Pooh Corner, The Mouse Factory, Donald Duck Presents and Mousercise. Each tape contained one Disney cartoon short.

- Volume One: "Bone Trouble"
- Volume Two: "Lion Down"
- Volume Three: "Mickey's Garden"
- Volume Four: "Mr. Mouse Takes a Trip"
- Volume Five: "Symphony Hour"
- Volume Six: "R'coon Dawg"

Preceded by N/A	Disney Channel Original Series	Succeeded by You and Me Kid
