= Have a Laugh! =

American animated comedy series

- Title card
- Genre: Comedy; Anthology; Cartoon series
- Voices of: Bret Iwan; Russi Taylor; Bill Farmer; Tony Anselmo; Tress MacNeille; Corey Burton; Jim Cummings
- Music by: Mark Watters
- Country of origin: United States
- Original language: English
- No. of episodes: 60

Production
- Running time: 3 minutes
- Production company: The Walt Disney Company

Original release
- Network: Disney Channel; Disney XD
- Release: October 26, 2009 – December 2, 2012

Related
- Mickey Mouse; House of Mouse

Have a Laugh! is an American animated comedy series produced by the Walt Disney Company for the Disney Channel. The series is a set of interstitials, presenting edited versions of classic Mickey Mouse cartoons that lasted from 2009 to 2012. The soundtracks were re-arranged by Mark Watters, orchestrated by Steven Bernstein and re-recorded at the Eastwood Scoring Stage, Warner Bros. Studios.

== Plot ==
The series features short and long versions of Disney shorts. The short versions are re-voiced with current Disney voice actors such as Tony Anselmo (Donald Duck), Jim Cummings, Bill Farmer (Goofy), and Bret Iwan (Mickey Mouse). The show features Disney cartoons with the original opening and closing credits restored (in instances where content is removed, a stamp bearing the words "Short Version" appears on the title card).

The series also features short subjects such as "Disney's Re-Micks" where classic Mickey Mouse cartoons are matched to popular songs such as "He Could Be the One" by Miley Cyrus, similar to the 1980s D-TV series, and "BLAM!", a sports recap style series of clips focusing on slapstick moments.

== List of major characters ==
- Mickey Mouse (voiced by Bret Iwan and Walt Disney)
- Minnie Mouse (voiced by Russi Taylor and Marcellite Garner)
- Goofy, Pluto (voiced by Bill Farmer)
- Donald Duck, Huey, Dewey, and Louie (voiced by Tony Anselmo)
- Daisy Duck, Chip (voiced by Tress MacNeille)
- Dale, Narrator (voiced by Corey Burton)
- Pete (voiced by Jim Cummings)

== List of short films ==
No.	Title	Theatrical release	Disney Channel airdate	Characters
1	Lonesome Ghosts	December 24, 1937	October 26, 2009 (re-recorded soundtrack and abridged version)	Mickey Mouse, Donald Duck, Goofy
2	Mickey and the Seal	December 3, 1948	November 11, 2009 (Veterans Day) (re-recorded soundtrack and abridged version)	Mickey Mouse, Pluto, Salty the Seal
3	Food for Feudin'	August 11, 1950	November 14, 2009 (re-recorded soundtrack and abridged version)	Pluto, Chip ˈn Dale
4	Winter Storage	June 3, 1949	November 20, 2009 (re-recorded soundtrack and abridged version)	Donald Duck, Chip 'n Dale
5	How to Hook Up Your Home Theater	December 21, 2007	December 5, 2009 (abridged version)	Goofy, Mickey Mouse (seen on Goofy's clock)
6	Mr. Mouse Takes a Trip	November 1, 1940	February 6, 2010 (re-recorded soundtrack and abridged version)	Mickey Mouse, Pluto, Pete
7	The Art of Skiing	November 14, 1941	February 13, 2010 (re-recorded soundtrack and abridged version)	Goofy
8	Clock Cleaners	October 15, 1937	March 6, 2010 (re-recorded soundtrack and abridged version)	Mickey Mouse, Donald Duck, Goofy
9	Early to Bed	July 11, 1941	March 19, 2010 (re-recorded soundtrack and abridged version)	Donald Duck
10	Mickey's Delayed Date	October 3, 1947	April 17, 2010 (re-recorded soundtrack and abridged version)	Mickey Mouse, Pluto, Minnie Mouse
11	How to Play Baseball	September 4, 1942	April 24, 2010 (re-recorded soundtrack and abridged version)	Goofy
12	Chef Donald	December 5, 1941	June 5, 2010 (re-recorded soundtrack and abridged version)	Donald Duck
13	Pluto and the Gopher	February 10, 1950	June 11, 2010 (re-recorded soundtrack and abridged version)	Pluto, Minnie Mouse
14	The Whalers	August 19, 1938	June 19, 2010 (re-recorded soundtrack and abridged version)	Mickey Mouse, Donald Duck, Goofy
15	Pluto's Sweater	April 29, 1949	July 4, 2010 (re-recorded soundtrack and abridged version)	Pluto, Minnie Mouse, Figaro, Butch
16	Hawaiian Holiday	September 24, 1937	August 20, 2010 (re-recorded soundtrack and abridged version)	Mickey Mouse, Minnie Mouse, Goofy, Pluto, Donald Duck
17	How to Swim	October 23, 1942	August 27, 2010 (re-recorded soundtrack and abridged version)	Goofy
18	Mickey Down Under	March 19, 1948	September 17, 2010 (both re-recorded soundtrack and abridged versions)	Mickey Mouse, Pluto
19	Trailer Horn	April 28, 1950	September 17, 2010 (both re-recorded soundtrack and abridged versions)	Donald Duck, Chip 'n Dale
20	Pluto's Surprise Package	March 4, 1949	September 24, 2010 (re-recorded soundtrack and abridged version)	Pluto
21	Polar Trappers	June 17, 1938	January 21, 2011 (re-recorded soundtrack and abridged version)	Donald Duck, Goofy
22	Rescue Dog	March 21, 1947	February 4, 2011 (re-recorded soundtrack and abridged version)	Pluto
23	Double Dribble	December 20, 1946	February 18, 2011 (re-recorded soundtrack and abridged version)	Goofy
24	Thru the Mirror	May 30, 1936	March 4, 2011 (re-recorded soundtrack and abridged version)	Mickey Mouse
25	Magician Mickey	February 6, 1937	April 1, 2011 (re-recorded soundtrack and abridged version)	Mickey Mouse, Donald Duck, Goofy
26	Boat Builders	February 25, 1938	May 6, 2011 (re-recorded soundtrack and abridged version)	Mickey Mouse, Minnie Mouse, Donald Duck, Goofy
27	Donald's Tire Trouble	January 29, 1943	May 8, 2011 (re-recorded soundtrack and abridged version)	Donald Duck
28	Bone Bandit	April 30, 1948	May 20, 2011 (re-recorded soundtrack and abridged version)	Pluto
29	The Simple Things	April 18, 1953	June 3, 2011 (re-recorded soundtrack and abridged version)	Mickey Mouse, Pluto
30	Pluto's Purchase	July 9, 1948	September 7, 2011 (re-recorded soundtrack and abridged version)	Pluto, Mickey Mouse, Butch
31	Beach Picnic	June 9, 1939	October 11, 2011 (re-recorded soundtrack and abridged version)	Donald Duck, Pluto
32	Mickey's Parrot	September 9, 1938	October 14, 2011 (re-recorded soundtrack and abridged version)	Mickey Mouse, Pluto
33	Mickey's Trailer	May 6, 1938	October 16, 2011 (re-recorded soundtrack and abridged version)	Mickey Mouse, Donald Duck, Goofy
34	Society Dog Show	February 3, 1939	October 21, 2011 (re-recorded soundtrack and abridged version)	Mickey Mouse, Pluto, Fifi
35	How to Play Football	September 15, 1944	November 4, 2011 (re-recorded soundtrack and abridged version)	Goofy
36	Tugboat Mickey	April 26, 1940	November 6, 2011 (re-recorded soundtrack and abridged version)	Mickey Mouse, Donald Duck, Goofy
37	The Little Whirlwind	February 14, 1941	November 7, 2011 (new music and sound effects added and abridged version)	Mickey Mouse, Minnie Mouse
38	Mail Dog	November 14, 1947	November 18, 2011 (re-recorded soundtrack and abridged version)	Pluto
39	Chip an' Dale	November 28, 1947	December 2, 2011 (re-recorded soundtrack and abridged version)	Donald Duck, Chip 'n Dale
40	On Ice	September 28, 1935	January 2, 2012 (re-recorded soundtrack and abridged version)	Mickey Mouse, Minnie Mouse, Donald Duck, Goofy, Pluto
41	The Band Concert	February 23, 1935	February 9, 2012 (re-recorded soundtrack and abridged version)	Mickey Mouse, Donald Duck, Goofy, Clarabelle Cow, Horace Horsecollar, Peter Pig
42	Mickey's Polo Team	January 4, 1936	February 16, 2012 (re-recorded soundtrack and abridged version)	Mickey Mouse, Donald Duck, Clarabelle Cow, Goofy
43	The Hockey Champ	April 28, 1939	March 1, 2012 (re-recorded soundtrack and abridged version)	Donald Duck, Huey, Dewey, Louie
44	How to Fish	December 11, 1942	March 15, 2012 (re-recorded soundtrack and abridged version)	Goofy
45	Pluto's Party	September 19, 1952	March 23, 2012 (re-recorded soundtrack and abridged version)	Pluto, Mickey Mouse
46	Mickey's Rival	June 20, 1936	May 6, 2012 (re-recorded soundtrack and abridged version)	Mickey Mouse, Minnie Mouse, Mortimer Mouse
47	Moose Hunters	February 20, 1937	May 13, 2012 (re-recorded soundtrack and abridged version)	Mickey Mouse, Donald Duck, Goofy
48	Mr. Duck Steps Out	June 7, 1940	May 20, 2012 (re-recorded soundtrack and abridged version)	Donald Duck, Huey, Dewey, Louie, Daisy Duck
49	The Olympic Champ	October 9, 1942	May 27, 2012 (re-recorded soundtrack and abridged version)	Goofy
50	Canine Caddy	May 30, 1941	June 1, 2012 (re-recorded soundtrack and abridged version)	Mickey Mouse, Pluto
51	Brave Little Tailor	September 30, 1938	July 1, 2012 (re-recorded soundtrack and abridged version)	Mickey Mouse, Minnie Mouse
52	Donald's Golf Game	November 4, 1938	July 15, 2012 (re-recorded soundtrack and abridged version)	Donald Duck, Huey, Dewey, Louie
53	Sea Scouts	June 30, 1939	August 1, 2012 (re-recorded soundtrack and abridged version)	Donald Duck, Huey, Dewey, Louie
54	Tennis Racquet	August 26, 1949	August 15, 2012 (re-recorded soundtrack and abridged version)	Goofy
55	Out of Scale	November 2, 1951	September 1, 2012 (re-recorded soundtrack and abridged version)	Donald Duck, Chip 'n Dale
56	*Mickey's Birthday Party	February 7, 1942	October 9, 2012 (re-recorded soundtrack and abridged version)	Mickey Mouse, Minnie Mouse, Donald Duck, Goofy, Clarabelle Cow, Horace Horsecollar, Clara Cluck
57	*All in a Nutshell	September 2, 1949	October 15, 2012 (re-recorded soundtrack and abridged version)	Donald Duck, Chip 'n Dale
58	*Corn Chips	March 23, 1951	November 1, 2012 (re-recorded soundtrack and abridged version)	Donald Duck, Chip 'n Dale
59	*Good Scouts	July 8, 1938	December 1, 2012 (re-recorded soundtrack and abridged version)	Donald Duck, Huey, Dewey, Louie
60	*How to Play Golf	March 10, 1944	December 2, 2012 (re-recorded soundtrack and abridged version)	Goofy

Eighteen cartoons and five redubbed short versions haven't been added online.

=== BLAM! ===
- Sports (clips from How to Play Football, Double Dribble and How to Play Baseball)
- Skiing (clips from The Art of Skiing)
- Ice Skating (clips from The Hockey Champ)
- Skiing 2 (clips from The Art of Skiing)
- Arctic Adventure (clips from Polar Trappers)
- Clock Cleaning (clips from Clock Cleaners)
- Golf (clips from How to Play Golf and Donald's Golf Game)
- Cooking (clips from Chef Donald)
- Glider (clips from Goofy's Glider)
- Fox Hunt (clips from The Fox Hunt)
- Beach (clips from Hawaiian Holiday)
- Workout 1 (clips from Goofy Gymnastics)
- Track And Field 1 (clips from The Olympic Champ)
- Workout 2 (clips from Goofy Gymnastics)
- Track And Field 2 (clips from The Olympic Champ)
- Self-Defense (clips from The Art Of Self-Defense)
- Snow Fight (clips from Donald's Snow Fight)
- Hockey (clips from Hockey Homicide)
- Basketball (clips from Double Dribble)
- Firefighting (clips from Fire Chief)

=== Re-Micks ===
- The B-52's: "Roam"
- The Beach Boys: "Surfin' Safari"
- The Black Eyed Peas: "I Gotta Feeling"
- deadmau5: "Ghosts 'n' Stuff"
- Far East Movement featuring Ryan Tedder: "Rocketeer"
- Michael Franti & Spearhead: "Say Hey (I Love You)"
- The Go-Go's: "We Got the Beat"
- Andy Grammer: "Keep Your Head Up"
- David Guetta and Kelly Rowland: "When Love Takes Over"
- Miley Cyrus: "He Could Be the One" (from Disney Channel's Hannah Montana)
- Hunter Hayes: "Wanted"
- Jessie J featuring B.o.B: "Price Tag"
- Marky Mark and the Funky Bunch featuring Loleatta Holloway: "Good Vibrations"
- Bruno Mars: "Just the Way You Are"
- Olly Murs: "Dance with Me Tonight"
- Ne-Yo: "Miss Independent"
- Queen: "Another One Bites the Dust"
- Martin Solveig and Dragonette: "Hello"
- Taylor Swift: "Stay Stay Stay"
- Jonas Brothers: "Play My Music" (from Disney Channel's Camp Rock)

== Broadcast history ==
United States

- Disney Channel (2009–2014)
- Disney XD (2009–2014)

United Kingdom

- Disney Channel (2009–2014)
- Disney XD/Disney Cinemagic (2010–2012)
- Channel 5/Fiver (2010–2012)

Ireland

- RTÉ One (2010–2013)
- RTÉ Two (2011–2013)

Canada

- Family Channel (2009–2014)
- Disney Channel (2015–present)

Germany

- Disney Channel (2010–present)
- Disney Cinemagic (2010-2019)

Italy

- Disney Channel (2009–2020)
- Toon Disney (2009–2011)
- Rai Due (2011)

India

- Disney Channel (2011–present)

Indonesia

- RCTI (2014)

== Home media ==
There have been four DVD releases, which include 5 shorts in restored quality, in two versions: one full-length original version, and one edited version. It also includes 3 BLAM! shorts and 1 Re-Micks.

The first two volumes were released on October 26, 2010, in the US and November/December 2010 in the UK.

Volume One:

- Mickey and the Seal
- Lonesome Ghosts
- Winter Storage
- How to Hook Up Your Home Theater
- Food for Feudin'
- BLAM! #1 = Sports
- BLAM! #2 = Skiing 1
- BLAM! #3 = Ice Skating
- Re-Micks "Another One Bites the Dust" by Queen

Volume Two:

- Clock Cleaners
- Mr. Mouse Takes a Trip
- The Art of Skiing
- Early to Bed
- Pluto's Sweater
- BLAM! #4 = Skiing 2
- BLAM! #5 = Arctic Adventure
- BLAM! #6 = Clock Cleaning
- Re-Micks – "He Could Be the One" by Miley Cyrus from Hannah Montana

Volumes 3 and 4 were released in the US on June 14, 2011. Volume 3 was later released in other countries, while no confirmation has been made for the UK release of Volume 3, or the international release of Volume 4.

Volume Three:

- Mickey's Delayed Date
- The Whalers
- Chef Donald
- How to Play Baseball
- Pluto and the Gopher
- BLAM! #7 = "Golf"
- BLAM! #8 = "Cooking"
- BLAM! #9 = "Glider"
- Re-Micks – "I Gotta Feeling" by The Black Eyed Peas

Volume Four:

- Mickey Down Under
- Hawaiian Holiday
- Trailer Horn
- How to Swim
- Pluto's Surprise Package
- BLAM! = #10 "Hockey"
- BLAM! = #11 "Beach"
- BLAM! = #12 "Fox Hunt"
- Re-Micks: "Play My Music" by the Jonas Brothers from Camp Rock
