= Classic Cartoon Favorites =

DVD series by Walt Disney Home Entertainment

Walt Disney's Classic Cartoon Favorites is a series of DVDs by Walt Disney Home Entertainment. Each release would feature around one hour of Disney animated short films, grouped by a starring character or a theme. It is based on the original Walt Disney Cartoon Classics line of videotapes of the 1980s. As opposed to the chronological nature of the Walt Disney Treasures line, each release would feature various cartoons in no particular order. The series featured a total of four waves of releases, between January 11, 2005 and April 11, 2006. Another similar line was Walt Disney's Funny Factory.

== Releases ==
=== Wave One ===
The first wave of four releases came on January 11, 2005. Each release focuses on a particular character, or pair of characters.

==== Volume 1: Starring Mickey ====
All of the shorts on here feature Mickey Mouse.

1. Mickey's Circus (1936)
2. Mickey's Garden (1935)
3. The Little Whirlwind (1941)
4. On Ice (1935)
5. Hawaiian Holiday (1937)
6. Moving Day (1936)
7. Orphan's Picnic (1936)

==== Volume 2: Starring Donald ====
All of the shorts on here feature Donald Duck.

1. Inferior Decorator (1948)
2. Don Donald (1937)
3. Golden Eggs (1941)
4. Bee at the Beach (1950)
5. Donald's Dog Laundry (1940)
6. Donald's Vacation (1940)
7. Old MacDonald Duck (1941)
8. Chef Donald (1941)

==== Volume 3: Starring Goofy ====
All of the shorts on here feature Goofy.

1. The Art of Skiing (1941)
2. How to Fish (1942)
3. How to Swim (1942)
4. Baggage Buster (1941)
5. How to Dance (1953)
6. Lion Down (1951)
7. The Big Wash (1948)
8. Hold That Pose (1950)
9. Father's Day Off (1953)

==== Volume 4: Starring Chip 'N Dale ====
All of the shorts on here feature Chip 'N' Dale.

1. Chicken in the Rough (1951)
2. Chip an' Dale (1947)
3. Out of Scale (1951)
4. Two Chips and a Miss (1952)
5. Food for Feudin' (1950)
6. Out On a Limb (1950)
7. Working for Peanuts (1953)
8. Three for Breakfast (1948)
9. Dragon Around (1954)

=== Wave Two ===
The second wave of three releases came on May 31, 2005. Each release has a theme.

==== Volume 5: Extreme Sports Fun ====
All of the shorts on here feature sports.

1. Canine Caddy (1941)
2. How to Play Baseball (1942)
3. The Hockey Champ (1939)
4. Double Dribble (1946)
5. How to Play Football (1944)
6. Mickey's Polo Team (1936)
7. Tennis Racquet (1949)
8. Goofy Gymnastics (1949)

==== Volume 6: Extreme Music Fun ====
All of the shorts on here feature music.

1. Mickey's Grand Opera (1936)
2. Music Land (1935)
3. Orphans' Benefit (1941)
4. Farmyard Symphony (1938)
5. Pluto's Blue Note (1947)
6. How to Dance (1953)
7. Woodland Café (1937)
8. Donald's Dilemma (1947)

==== Volume 7: Extreme Adventure Fun ====
All of the shorts on here feature adventure.

1. Mickey's Trailer (1938)
2. No Sail (1945)
3. Good Scouts (1938)
4. Hello Aloha (1952)
5. Old Sequoia (1945)
6. How to Ride a Horse (1941)
7. Trailer Horn (1950)
8. Two Weeks Vacation (1952)

=== Wave Three ===
The third wave of two releases came on September 27, 2005. Each release has a holiday theme.

==== Volume 8: Holiday Celebration with Mickey & Pals ====
All of the shorts on here are holiday-themed.

1. Mickey's Good Deed (1932)
2. Peculiar Penguins (1934)
3. The Clock Watcher (1945)
4. Rescue Dog (1947)
5. Corn Chips (1951)
6. Lend a Paw (1941)
7. Toy Tinkers (1949)

==== Volume 9: Classic Holiday Stories ====
All of the shorts on here are holiday-themed.

1. The Small One (1978)
2. Pluto's Christmas Tree (1952)
3. Mickey's Christmas Carol (1983)

=== Wave Four ===
The fourth wave of four releases came on April 11, 2006. Each release focuses on a pair of characters.

==== Volume 10: Best Pals: Mickey & Minnie ====
All of the shorts on here feature Mickey Mouse and Minnie Mouse.

1. First Aiders (1944)
2. Bath Day (1946)
3. Pluto and the Gopher (1950)
4. Figaro and Frankie (1947)
5. Mickey's Rival (1936)
6. The Nifty Nineties (1941)
7. Pluto's Sweater (1949)
8. Mickey's Delayed Date (1947)

==== Volume 11: Best Pals: Donald & Daisy ====
All of the shorts on here feature Donald Duck and Daisy Duck.

1. Mr. Duck Steps Out (1940)
2. Cured Duck (1945)
3. Donald's Double Trouble (1946)
4. Sleepy Time Donald (1947)
5. Crazy Over Daisy (1950)
6. Donald's Dream Voice (1948)
7. Donald's Crime (1945)
8. Donald's Diary (1954)

==== Volume 12: Best Pals: Mickey & Pluto ====
All of the shorts on here feature Mickey Mouse and Pluto.

1. Pluto's Fledgling (1948)
2. Cat Nap Pluto (1948)
3. Pueblo Pluto (1949)
4. Plutopia (1951)
5. Pluto's Party (1952)
6. Pluto's Housewarming (1947)
7. Pluto and the Armadillo (1943)
8. Pluto Junior (1942)

== Reception ==
A negative review of the Mickey subseries at DVD Talk criticised the selection, "The selection, to say the least, is baffling. No effort has been made, for instance, to present the shorts chronologically, offer a wider sampling of shorts covering Mickey's long career (e.g., start with Steamboat Willie, then Mickey's first color short, etc.), to present the best or most representative shorts, or even to compile those cartoons which provide Mickey his best showcases. "

Another review wrote, "Classic Cartoon Favorites might be Disney's most aptly-titled DVD line yet. Each installment delivers one hour's worth of Disney animated short subjects tied together by a theme that can't always be considered cohesive. That theme generally involves the appearance of Disney's most marketable characters from the 1940s and '50s. Of course, the Walt Disney Treasures series still rules the roost when it comes to collecting Disney's classic shorts, but those are more expensive and difficult to find, which probably explains the CCF line's soaring popularity."

Certain volumes received better reviews, the Chip N Dale volume was presented as follows: "Still, the group of shorts included in Disney's new compilation entitled Walt Disney's Classic Cartoon Favorites Volume 4 Starring Chip N Dale (phew!), while nothing inherently earth-shattering, remains moderately charming and entertaining throughout.." while a review of the volume 7 of the second wave of the line wrote, "To the serious collectors, I'd say bite the bullet and drop the extra 12 bucks, because you just know you want the three cartoons that are exclusive to this collection. To casual fans, newcomers, and parents with good taste, I've no problem recommending this DVD whatsoever."
