= How to Play Baseball =

1942 film by Jack Kinney

- Directed by: Jack Kinney
- Produced by: Walt Disney
- Starring: Pinto Colvig
- Music by: Paul J. Smith
- Animation by: Les Clark; Marc Davis; Hugh Fraser; Ollie Johnston; Ward Kimball; Milt Neil; John Sibley; Bill Tytla
- Layouts by: Al Zinnen
- Production company: Walt Disney Productions
- Distributed by: RKO Radio Pictures
- Release date: September 4, 1942
- Running time: 8 minutes
- Country: United States
- Language: English

How to Play Baseball is a cartoon produced by Walt Disney Productions and released by RKO Radio Pictures on September 4, 1942, featuring Goofy. The short was produced at the request of Samuel Goldwyn and first shown to accompany the 1942 feature film The Pride of the Yankees.

== Plot ==
Goofy takes the time to demonstrate America's national pastime, then plays a game - one in which he plays all the bases. The short describes the basics of baseball in humorous terms; the equipment, uniforms, positions, and pitches, as well as the mannerisms of the players. It then switches to a game in progress, a deciding game in the World Series between the fictional Blue Sox and Gray Sox (possibly a parody of the real-life Chicago White Sox and Boston Red Sox). The Blue Sox are up three runs and working a no-hitter when the Grays rally in the bottom of the ninth. In a series of events the Grays load the bases, leading to a base clearing hit.

The game is tied, but the play at the plate is too close to call for the umpire, and it then ends in an argument. They unmask the umpire (yet another Goofy!) and the other players attack the three. The narrator then concludes the short praising the values of what makes baseball America's sport.

== Production ==
This is the first of Disney's "How to..." shorts starring Goofy. The short was made on a rushed schedule of 12 weeks so it could be released in time to accompany Samuel Goldwyn's The Pride of the Yankees. It was followed by nine "How to..." shorts in Walt Disney's lifetime: How to Swim and How to Fish (both also in 1942); How to Be a Sailor, How to Play Football, and How to Play Golf (1944); How to Ride a Horse (1950, originally included in The Reluctant Dragon in 1941); How to Be a Detective (1952); and How to Sleep and How to Dance (both 1953).

After Disney's death, the studio produced How to Haunt a House (1999) and How to Hook Up Your Home Theater (2007). Similarly-styled Goofy shorts that do not include the "How to" titling convention are The Olympic Champ (1942), Hockey Homicide (1945), Goofy Gymnastics (1949) and Motor Mania (1950). Prior to How to Play Baseball, Disney had released two other "instructional" shorts starring Goofy: The Art of Skiing and The Art of Self Defense in November and December 1941, respectively.

== Voice cast ==
- Goofy: Pinto Colvig
- Narrator: Fred Shields

== Reception ==
Bosley Crowther of The New York Times called it "deliciously confused ... goofy burlesque".

The Film Daily wrote: "With a serious world looking forward to the World Series, that incomparable master of animated humor, Walt Disney, comes forward with one of his most side-splitting subjects... The footage was especially created by Disney to accompany Samuel Goldwyn's RKO Radio powerhouse, The Pride of the Yankees... Exhibs. will be figurative namesakes of Goofy if they don't book this one."

== Releases ==
- 1942 - theatrical release
- 1956 - Disneyland, episode #2.24: "The Goofy Sports Story" (TV)
- 1972 - The Mouse Factory, episode #17: "Sports" (TV)
- 1977 - The New Mickey Mouse Club, episode #1.20: "Showtime" (TV)
- 1979 - Disney's Wonderful World, episode #26.4: "Baseball Fever" (TV)
- c. 1983 - Good Morning, Mickey!, episode #22 (TV)
- c. 1992 - Mickey's Mouse Tracks, episode #55 (TV)
- c. 1992 - Donald's Quack Attack, episode #41 (TV)
- c. 1997 - The Ink and Paint Club, episode #3: "Sports Goofy" (TV)
- 2010 - Have a Laugh!, episode #15 (TV)

== Home media ==
The short was released on December 2, 2002 on Walt Disney Treasures: The Complete Goofy.

Additional releases include:

- 1983 - "Cartoon Classics: Sport Goofy" (VHS)
- 2005 - "Classic Cartoon Favorites: Extreme Sports Fun" (DVD)
- 2011 - "Have a Laugh! Volume Three" (DVD)
