= The Art of Skiing =

- Directed by: Jack Kinney (uncredited)
- Story by: Leo Thiele (uncredited); Ralph Wright (uncredited)
- Produced by: Walt Disney
- Starring: Hannes Schroll
- Narrated by: John McLeish
- Music by: Charles Wolcott (uncredited)
- Color process: Technicolor
- Production company: Walt Disney Productions
- Distributed by: RKO Radio Pictures
- Release date: November 14, 1941 (US)
- Running time: 8 min (one reel)
- Language: English

The Art of Skiing is an animated Goofy cartoon short made by Walt Disney Productions in 1941. It has historical significance as the first cartoon to use the now-famous Goofy holler, provided by Hannes Schroll, as well as the short that led to the "How to..." series, beginning with How to Play Baseball (1942) and continuing through How to Hook Up Your Home Theater (2007).

== Notes ==
Goofy goes to Sugar Bowl Ski Resort, to learn how to ski. The name of the resort can be seen in the opening frames of the cartoon. Sugar Bowl Ski Resort was used because Walt Disney had an interest in the Sugar Bowl ski area, to the extent that one of the peaks at Sugar Bowl is named Mt. Disney after him.

The narrator and the opening titles mention an alternate (and obscure) pronunciation of skiing as shee-ing, despite the narrator mostly pronouncing it vice versa throughout the short.

This was the first cartoon to use the signature Goofy holler; it is the only vocal uttered by Goofy in the short.

The yodeling was recorded from Hannes Schroll's ski house deck. The house was built by Jerome Hill, another backer of Sugar Bowl Ski Resort. The house fell into Schroll's possession though his wife, Hill's sister. The house is now owned by John and Kate Anderson.

== Voice cast ==
- Narrator: John McLeish
- Yodeler: Hannes Schroll

== Releases ==
- 1941 - theatrical release
- 1956 - Disneyland, episode #2.24: "The Goofy Sports Story" (TV)
- 1972 - The Mouse Factory, episode #17: "Sports" (TV)
- 1976 - "Superstar Goofy" (TV)
- c. 1983 - Good Morning, Mickey!, episode #80 (TV)
- 1983 - "A Disney Channel Christmas" (TV)
- c. 1992 - Mickey's Mouse Tracks, episode #36 (TV)
- c. 1997 - The Ink and Paint Club, episode #3: "Sports Goofy" (TV)
- 2010 - Have a Laugh!, episode #6 (TV)
- 2010 - Mickey's Christmas Special (TV)

== Home media ==
The short was released on December 2, 2002, on Walt Disney Treasures: The Complete Goofy.

Additional releases include:

- 1981 - "Goofy Over Sports" (VHS)
- 1983 - "Cartoon Classics: More Sport Goofy" (VHS)
- 1986 - "Jiminy Cricket's Christmas" (VHS)
- 1992 - "Cartoon Classics Special Edition: The Goofy World of Sports" (VHS)
- 2001 - bonus on DVD release of Santa Who? (DVD).
- 2001 - Goofy's Fun House (PlayStation video game)
- 2005 - "Classic Cartoon Favorites: Starring Goofy" (DVD)
- 2010 - Have a Laugh! Volume Two" (DVD)
- 2013 - Mickey's Christmas Carol: 30th Anniversary Edition (Blu-ray/DVD/Digital HD)
- 2018 - Olaf's Frozen Adventure (Blu-ray/DVD/Digital HD)
