= Polar Trappers =

1938 Donald Duck cartoon

- Directed by: Ben Sharpsteen
- Produced by: Walt Disney
- Starring: Pinto Colvig; Clarence Nash
- Music by: Paul J. Smith
- Animation by: Arthur Babbitt; Al Eugster; Winfield 'Vin' Hoskins; Ed Love; Woolie Reitherman; Shamus Culhane; Bob Wickersham; Stan Quackenbush; Cornett Wood
- Layouts by: Charles Philippi
- Backgrounds by: Mique Nelson
- Color process: Technicolor
- Production company: Walt Disney Productions
- Distributed by: RKO Radio Pictures
- Release date: June 17, 1938 (U.S.)
- Running time: 8:20
- Country: United States
- Language: English

Polar Trappers is a 1938 Donald Duck and Goofy cartoon set in the South Pole, where the duo are trapping polar animals (or at least, attempting to). This is the first of the six short films of the Donald & Goofy series, as well as the first cartoon where Donald Duck and Goofy appear without Mickey Mouse.

== Plot ==
Goofy is setting up an animal trap while Donald is in an igloo preparing a meal. Donald explains how sick he is of eating beans all the time, and, while noticing a penguin outside, he hatches a plan while thinking of the penguin as roast chicken. The rest of the cartoon deals with him trying to lure a large group of penguins into his pot while Goofy is stuck trying desperately to catch a walrus.

The name of Donald's and Goofy's trapping business is "Donald & Goofy Trapping Co". Their slogan is "We Bring 'Em Back Alive". This is Donald's first time encountering penguins, but it is not his last. The music played while Donald leads the penguins is the instrumental piece The Parade of the Tin Soldiers" by Leon Jessel.

When a baby penguin's tear turned into a snowball, after being kicked out of the march angrily by Donald after the small penguin kept on getting in front of him and the fact that Donald doesn't want to cook the small penguin due to its size, the other penguins notice the snowball coming and quickly dive into the snow for safety, but Donald runs for his life. When he gets into a collision with Goofy, they both run for their lives until they get caught in the snowball, and fall on their workplace, completely destroying it. Donald and Goofy are then seen in the cages they brought for the animals they plan to catch, and a can of beans falls into Donald's mouth, making him grumble in anger when the short ends.

== Voice cast ==
- Goofy: Pinto Colvig
- Donald Duck: Clarence Nash

== Releases ==
- 1938 - theatrical release
- c. 1972 - The Mouse Factory, episode #23: "Penguins" (TV)
- c. 1983 - Good Morning, Mickey!, episode #48 (TV)
- c. 1992 - Donald's Quack Attack, episode #24 (TV)
- 1997 - The Ink and Paint Club, episode #1.25: "Goofy Goofs Around" (TV)
- 2011 - Have a Laugh!, episode #18 (TV)

== Home media ==
The short was released on May 18, 2004 on Walt Disney Treasures: The Chronological Donald, Volume One: 1934-1941.

Additional releases include:

- 1986 - "The Importance of Being Donald" (VHS)
- 1986 - "Mickey Knows Best/The Importance of Being Donald" (laserdisc)
- 2007 - "It's a Small World of Fun: Volume 4" (DVD)
- 2018 - Olaf's Frozen Adventure (DVD & Blu-ray)
