= Double Dribble (film) =

1946 film

- Directed by: Jack Hannah
- Story by: Bill Berg; Milt Banta
- Produced by: Walt Disney
- Starring: Pinto Colvig (uncredited)
- Music by: Oliver Wallace
- Animation by: Bill Justice; John Sibley; Hugh Fraser; Andy Engman
- Layouts by: Yale Gracey
- Backgrounds by: Maurice Greenberg
- Color process: Technicolor
- Production company: Walt Disney Productions
- Distributed by: RKO Radio Pictures
- Release date: December 20, 1946
- Running time: 7 minutes (one reel)
- Language: English

Double Dribble is a 1946 Disney theatrical cartoon short that spoofs the sport of basketball and stars Goofy. It is directed by Jack Hannah.

== Plot ==
A series of characters of the same species as Goofy are playing a game of college basketball, with one team representing "U.U." and the other representing the hopelessly outmatched and undersized "P.U." The short primarily focuses on a wide gamut of physically impossible and illegal stunts taken by each team. In the end, P.U. wins the match on a last-second shot that sends a P.U. player through the basket (although it appears to be P.U.'s own basket).

The game ends with the lone fan in the stands, presumably Goofy himself, singing the P.U. alma mater.

When the series was edited for television, this character was voiced by Jeff Bennett with a very different voice, more closely resembling the voice of Mr. Smee from Disney adaptations of Peter Pan.

== Production ==
As an inside joke, the players are named for members of Disney's staff: Kinney, Lounsbery, Hannah and Sibley.

== Trivia ==
The Basketball court shown in the short doesn't feature three point line as it wasn't introduced in the professional game until 1960s.

== Voice cast ==
- Goofy: Pinto Colvig

== Releases ==
- 1946 - theatrical release
- 1956 - Disneyland, episode #3.6: "Goofy's Cavalcade of Sports" (TV)
- 1972 - The Mouse Factory, episode #1.12: "Spectator Sports" (TV)
- 1976 - "Superstar Goofy" (TV)
- 1981 - "Goofy Over Sports" (TV)
- c. 1983 - Good Morning, Mickey!, episode #25 (TV)
- 1987 - "An All-New Adventure of Disney's Sport Goofy" (TV)
- c. 1992 - Mickey's Mouse Tracks, episode #69 (TV)
- c. 1992 - Donald's Quack Attack, episode #21 (TV)
- 1998 - The Ink and Paint Club, episode #35: "More Sports Goofy" (TV)
- 2011 - Have a Laugh!, episode #20 (TV)

== Home media ==
The short was released on December 2, 2002, on Walt Disney Treasures: The Complete Goofy.

Additional releases include:

- 1983 - "Cartoon Classics: More Sport Goofy" (VHS)
- 2005 - "Classic Cartoon Favorites: Extreme Sports Fun" (DVD)

== See also ==
- List of Disney animated shorts—1940s
