= Mickey and the Seal =

1948 Mickey Mouse cartoon

Mickey and The Seal
- Directed by: Charles Nichols
- Story by: Nick George; Milt Schaffer
- Produced by: Walt Disney
- Starring: Ford Banes; James MacDonald; Pinto Colvig (all uncredited)
- Music by: Oliver Wallace
- Animation by: Phil Duncan; Hugh Fraser; George Nicholas; Dan MacManus; Nick George
- Layouts by: Karl Karpé
- Backgrounds by: Ralph Hulett
- Color process: Technicolor
- Production company: Walt Disney Productions
- Distributed by: RKO Radio Pictures
- Release date: December 3, 1948
- Running time: 6:38 (one reel)
- Country: United States
- Language: English

Mickey and the Seal is a cartoon short created by Walt Disney in 1948. It was nominated for Academy Award for Best Animated Short Film, but lost to MGM's Tom and Jerry cartoon The Little Orphan, which shared one of seven Oscars for the Tom and Jerry series. It was the 122nd short in the Mickey Mouse film series to be released, and the second produced that year.

== Plot ==
Mickey Mouse visits the seal exhibit at a zoo. He makes the seals perform tricks by feeding them fish. One young seal escapes from the exhibit to get more fish and ends up inside Mickey's basket. Mickey takes the basket home, where Pluto is begging for food. When Mickey puts the basket down, Pluto goes to investigate but is hit on the nose by the seal's flippers. Pluto tries to tell Mickey what happened, but Mickey can't understand him. While this is happening, the seal escapes from the basket and Pluto chases it, only to get his head stuck inside the basket. He blunders around and, in the process, makes a mess of the kitchen, getting Mickey’s attention. He angrily orders Pluto out of the house, despite Pluto's attempts to tell him what he was chasing.

When Mickey goes to the bathroom to take a bath, he doesn't notice the seal hop into the tank just before him. Completely unaware of what's around him, Mickey ends up scrubbing the seal's head with his brush instead of his back, which he intended to clean. Mickey eventually realizes that he's not scrubbing himself, but still can't see the seal behind him. The seal then begins scrubbing Mickey's head, which makes Mickey puzzled. Pluto later comes to the window and tries to tell Mickey again, but Mickey shuts the shade. When the seal takes his scrubbing brush, Mickey tries to get it back, only to grab the seal by mistake; he yells with fright upon seeing it. After jumping out of the tub, Mickey grabs a stool to nab the intruder, drains the water, and only then does he realize there is a seal in the tub.

Despite Mickey's orders to stay outside, an angry Pluto storms in and crashes into the tub and then tries to attack the seal after Mickey introduces him to it. After Pluto becomes alarmed and angry when Mickey decides to keep it as a pet, Mickey changes his mind about it (seeing that Pluto won't enjoy the seal's company and that it isn't a good idea to have a wild animal for a pet) and instead take the seal back to the zoo, and Pluto smiles in reply (taking a liking to that idea) before bringing over Mickey's basket. After Mickey and Pluto drop it off, the seal shows the other seals the things it learned about bathtime from Mickey and Pluto. When Mickey comes home, he and Pluto find that all the seals have moved into their house and are using the bathroom and bathtub as their personal exhibit and pool, respectively, and using an ironing board as a diving board.

The young seal then waves goodbye from the shower, which concludes the cartoon.

== Cast ==
- Ford Banes as Mickey Mouse
- James MacDonald as Pluto
- Pinto Colvig as Salty the Seal

== Releases ==
- 1948 - theatrical release
- 1956 - Disneyland, episode #3.11: "At Home with Donald Duck" (TV)
- 1968 - Walt Disney's Wonderful World of Color, episode #15.11: "The Mickey Mouse Anniversary Show"
- c. 1983 - Good Morning, Mickey!, episode #38 (TV)
- c. 1989 - Cheetah, re-release
- c. 1992 - Mickey's Mouse Tracks, episode #45 (TV)
- c. 1992 - Donald's Quack Attack, episode #36 (TV)
- c. 2000 - Walt Disney World TVs (TV)
- 2002 - House of Mouse, episode #2.9: "King Larry Swings In" (TV)
- 2009 - Have a Laugh!, episode #1 (TV)

== Home media ==
The short was released on May 18, 2004 on Walt Disney Treasures: Mickey Mouse in Living Color, Volume Two: 1939-Today.

Additional releases include:

- 1983 - "Cartoon Classics: Disney's Best of 1931-1948" (VHS)
- 1988 - "Cartoon Classics: Special Edition" (VHS)
- 1998 - "The Spirit of Mickey" (VHS)
- 2006 - "Funny Factory with Mickey" (DVD)
- 2010 - "Have a Laugh! Volume One" (DVD)

== See also ==
- Mickey Mouse (film series)
