= Hawaiian Holiday =

1937 Mickey Mouse cartoon

- Theatrical release poster
- Directed by: Ben Sharpsteen
- Produced by: Walt Disney; John Sutherland
- Starring: Walt Disney; Marcellite Garner; Clarence Nash; Pinto Colvig
- Music by: Paul J. Smith
- Animation by: Shamus Culhane; Nick DeTolly; Frenchy de Tremaudan; Al Eugster; Nick George; Wolfgang Reitherman
- Layouts by: Robert Dranko
- Color process: Technicolor
- Production company: Walt Disney Productions
- Distributed by: RKO Radio Pictures
- Release date: September 24, 1937
- Running time: 8 minutes
- Country: United States
- Language: English

Hawaiian Holiday is a 1937 American animated short film produced by Walt Disney Productions and released by RKO Radio Pictures. The cartoon stars an ensemble cast of The Fabulous Five (Mickey Mouse, Minnie Mouse, Donald Duck, Goofy, and Pluto) while vacationing in Hawaii (at the time was an organized incorporated territory of the United States). The film was directed by Ben Sharpsteen, produced by John Sutherland and features the voices of Walt Disney as Mickey, Marcellite Garner as Minnie, Clarence Nash as Donald, and Pinto Colvig as Goofy and Pluto. It was Disney's first film to be released by RKO, ending a five-year distributing partnership with United Artists.

Hawaiian Holiday was the 96th short in the Mickey Mouse film series to be released, and the seventh for the year. The cartoon features the music of "On the Beach at Waikiki", performed by Hawaiian musician Frank Ferera, and "Aloha ʻOe", written by Hawaii's former queen, Liliʻuokalani.

The main premise is that the vacationers encounter separate problems. Goofy is practicing surfing, but he meets seemingly sentient waves who torment him. He suffers comical injuries, such as hitting his head on rocks. Donald's grass skirt catches fire, and he has to put the blaze out. Pluto is attacked first by a starfish and secondly by a crab. Goofy is eventually buried alive in a makeshift grave, causing his friends to laugh.

== Plot ==
Mickey, Minnie, Donald, Goofy, and Pluto are on holiday in Hawaii. Minnie hula dances in a grass skirt while Mickey plays a slide guitar, Donald plays a ukulele, and Pluto chases the waves. Meanwhile, Goofy decides to go surfing, but when he rushes toward the wave it seems to have a mind of its own, running backwards as soon as Goofy starts running toward it, causing Goofy to hit his head on a rock. The wave then comes back in and washes Goofy around, eventually leaving his head stuck in the sand.

Mickey begins to have a problem with his guitar, while Minnie and Donald trade places. However, when Donald takes his turn with the skirt, he dances too close to the fire and accidentally sets the skirt on fire. He rapidly goes to a pool to put the blaze out, but in the process, he pulls up a starfish. Donald throws the starfish off his bottom and it lands right in front of Pluto. After Pluto sniffs at it, it begins to rapidly run away. Pluto chases it right up to the waves where he gets buried in the sand. The starfish hops right over him, hits him on the nose, and escapes while Pluto looks on in frustration.

Goofy tries his luck with the waves again and is actually able to get a swell, but it breaks beneath him and washes his board away. As Goofy searches underwater for his board, another wave comes it and drives his board into his pants, leaving him struggling to get it out.

Meanwhile, Pluto is sniffing at a seashell. A wave comes in and knocks him off his feet, which also leaves the shell stuck to his nose. Pluto tries to shake the shell off, but it gets stuck on his bottom instead. He tries and tries to get it off, but can't seem to. It is later revealed that there is a crab living in the shell, which clamps onto Pluto's tail. Although he can feel something on his tail, Pluto does not fully notice the crab until it pinches him, which makes him yelp in pain. The crab begins walking in a certain pattern which Pluto follows until they reach the surf, where a wave comes in and buries Pluto. As with the starfish, the crab tortures him by hitting him on the nose before departing.

Meanwhile, Goofy tries one last time to catch a wave successfully, but the wave throws him off his board, hits him with it, and catapults him into the sand where he is stopped by his board, making it look as if it was his grave. Mickey, Minnie and Donald laugh at him, and when he pops out unharmed and happy, they continue enjoying their holiday.

== Cast ==
- Walt Disney as Mickey Mouse
- Marcellite Garner as Minnie Mouse
- Clarence Nash as Donald Duck
- Pinto Colvig as Goofy and Pluto

== Releases ==
- 1937 - theatrical release
- 1956 - Disneyland, episode #2.22: "On Vacation" (TV)
- c. 1972 - The Mouse Factory, episode #7: "Water Sports" (TV)
- c. 1983 - Good Morning, Mickey!, episode #14 (TV)
- c. 1992 - Mickey's Mouse Tracks, episode #10 (TV)
- c. 1992 - Donald's Quack Attack, episode #19 (TV)
- 1997 - The Ink and Paint Club, episode #1.10: "Mickey, Donald & Goofy: Friends to the End" (TV)
- 2010 - Have a Laugh!, episode #13 (TV)

== Home media ==
The short was released on December 4, 2001 on Walt Disney Treasures: Mickey Mouse in Living Color.

Additional releases include:

- 1978 - "Walt Disney Presents On Vacation with Mickey Mouse and Friends" (Discovision Laserdisc #D61-503)
- 1981 - "On Vacation with Mickey and Friends" (VHS)
- 1981 - "Mickey Mouse and Donald Duck Cartoon Collections Volume Two" (laserdisc)
- 1987 - "Cartoon Classics: Starring Mickey and Minnie" (VHS)
- 2005 - "Classic Cartoon Favorites: Starring Mickey" (DVD)
- 2011 - "Have a Laugh!: Volume 4" (DVD)
- 2019 - Disney+
- 2023 - "Mickey & Minnie: 10 Classic Shorts - Volume 1" (Blu-ray/DVD/Digital)

== See also ==
- Mickey Mouse (film series)
