= Clock Cleaners =

1937 Mickey Mouse cartoon

- Theatrical release standee placard
- Directed by: Ben Sharpsteen
- Story by: Otto Englander; Roy Williams
- Produced by: Walt Disney
- Starring: Walt Disney; Clarence Nash; Pinto Colvig; Jimmy MacDonald
- Music by: Paul J. Smith; Oliver Wallace
- Animation by: Art Babbitt; Chuck Couch; Frenchy DeTremaudan; Al Eugster; Wolfgang Reitherman; Bill Roberts
- Color process: Technicolor
- Production company: Walt Disney Productions
- Distributed by: RKO Radio Pictures
- Release date: October 15, 1937
- Running time: 8 minutes
- Country: United States
- Language: English

Clock Cleaners is a 1937 American animated short film produced by Walt Disney Productions and released by RKO Radio Pictures. The cartoon follows Mickey Mouse, Donald Duck, and Goofy working as janitors in a tall clock tower. The film was directed by Ben Sharpsteen and features original music by Paul Smith and Oliver Wallace. The voice cast includes Walt Disney as Mickey, Clarence Nash as Donald and Pinto Colvig as Goofy. It was the 97th short in the Mickey Mouse film series to be released, and the eighth for that year.

Clock Cleaners is one of Disney's most critically acclaimed short films. In 1994, 1,000 members of the animation field voted Clock Cleaners as the 27th greatest cartoon of all time. This cartoon was released two months before Snow White and the Seven Dwarfs (1937).

== Plot ==
Mickey, Donald and Goofy are assigned to clean a tall clock tower in a city. Mickey is outside cleaning the face with a mop by riding on the second hand. Goofy is inside the building cleaning gear teeth with a large toothbrush. Donald (singing "Hickory Dickory Dock") starts to mop the mainspring, ignoring several warning signs. He gets the mop caught and springs it loose, trapping him inside.

Meanwhile, Mickey, now cleaning inside the clock, comes across a sleeping stork which he tries unsuccessfully to remove. The stork proves to be a major challenge, as it does not move no matter what Mickey tries, and even when Mickey does get the stork to move, it gets turned around and ends up right back where it started. As he throws the stork out of the tower, it flies back in and snatches Mickey, carrying him as if he were a baby, then letting go of Mickey before flying back in, leaving him hanging on a rope as water from the bucket falls on his head.

Back inside, Donald is getting the mainspring back into place with a mallet, but he struggles to get the very last piece in place. The loose end of the spring taps Donald and when he shouts at it, the spring responds with an echo of his words. At the end of the argument, Donald loses his temper and hits the spring with the mallet, but it sends it back and knocks him off. Donald gets his head stuck in a gear on the balance wheel shaft, and when he finally is free from it, the oscillation makes his body continue to move.

Now outside, Goofy, singing "Asleep in the Deep", is cleaning the outside bell. As he is cleaning the interior of the bell, it becomes 4:00 PM, causing two mechanical statues to come from inside the tower and ring the bell by taking turns striking it, for a total of four times. The first figure, representing Father Time, approaches without Goofy noticing. When the bell rings with Goofy inside it, his head vibrates violently and he sits down. Before he has regained his composure the statue has returned to the tower, and he then looks around suspiciously and says "Mice!" The second figure, representing Lady Liberty, rings the bell from the other side and he is once again vibrated. After the second ring, Goofy is determined to be ready for the next time. As the bell is struck a third time, he leaps out and is ready to attack, but when he sees Lady Liberty coming for the fourth ring, he idiotically apologizes and bows. Then the Liberty figure's torch arm drops and gives Goofy a big knock to the head, putting him in a lovestruck daze. Mickey is alarmed when he sees Goofy almost fall and tries to save him. At each turn, Mickey is just barely able to save Goofy. At last, Goofy lands on a flag pole that sends him and Mickey to fly through a window into the clock, land on the mainspring which Donald had finally managed to put back together, undoing all the springs again, then all three land in the same gear in which Donald was stuck earlier, causing their bodies to move in a humorous rhythm.

== Cast ==
- Walt Disney as Mickey Mouse
- Clarence Nash as Donald Duck
- Pinto Colvig as Goofy
- Jimmy MacDonald as Spring

== Controversy ==
Donald confronts the talking mainspring.

In 1994, Donald Wildmon and the American Family Association successfully campaigned for Wal-Mart to stop selling the VHS tape Cartoon Classics: Fun on the Job!, which included Clock Cleaners, due to two instances of perceived foul language. The alleged vulgarities were Donald Duck saying "Says who?" and "snake in the grass", which some listeners misheard as "fuck you" and "son of a bitch", respectively.

== Releases ==
- 1937 - theatrical release
- 1950 - One Hour in Wonderland (TV)
- 1972 - The Mouse Factory, episode #15: "Back to Nature" (TV)
- c. 1983 - Good Morning, Mickey!, episode #56 (TV)
- 1986 - theatrical re-release with The Great Mouse Detective
- 1990 - "Goofy's Guide to Success" (TV)
- c. 1992 - Mickey's Mouse Tracks, episode #77 (TV)
- c. 1992 - Donald's Quack Attack, episode #60 (TV)
- 1997 - The Ink and Paint Club, episode #1.22: "Classic Mickey" (TV)
- 2010 - Have a Laugh!, episode #7 (TV)

== Home media ==
The short was released on December 4, 2001, on Walt Disney Treasures: Mickey Mouse in Living Color.

Additional releases include:

- 1984 - "Cartoon Classics: Mickey's Crazy Careers" (VHS)
- 1992 - "Cartoon Classics - Special Edition: Fun on the Job!" (VHS)
- 2002 - bonus on DVD of The Great Mouse Detective (DVD)
- 2006 - "Funny Factory with Goofy" (DVD)
- 2010 - "Have a Laugh! Volume Two" (DVD)
- 2019 - Disney+

== See also ==
- Mickey Mouse (film series)
