= The Whalers =

1938 Mickey Mouse cartoon

- Title card
- Directed by: Dick Huemer
- Produced by: Walt Disney
- Starring: Clarence Nash; Pinto Colvig
- Music by: Albert Hay Malotte
- Animation by: Art Babbitt; Preston Blair; Al Eugster; Eric Larson; Robert Leffingwell; Ed Love; Joshua Meador; Lee Morehouse; Frank Oreb; Art Palmer; Don Patterson; Milt Schaffer; Louie Schmitt; Marvin Woodward
- Color process: Technicolor
- Production company: Walt Disney Productions
- Distributed by: RKO Radio Pictures
- Release date: August 19, 1938
- Running time: 8 min (one reel)
- Language: English

The Whalers is a cartoon produced by Walt Disney Productions, released by RKO Radio Pictures on August 19, 1938, and featuring Mickey Mouse, Donald Duck, and Goofy.

The short was directed by Dick Huemer. It featured the voices of Clarence 'Ducky' Nash as Donald Duck and Pinto Colvig as Goofy. Mickey does not speak in this short. It was animated by Ed Love, Marvin Woodward, Art Babbitt, Frank Oreb, Robert Leffingwell, Louie Schmitt, Lee Morehouse, Al Eugster, Josh Meador, Eric Larson, Preston Blair, and Milt Schaffer. The music was provided by Albert Hay Malotte, uncredited in the film. It was the 101st short in the Mickey Mouse film series to be released, and the third for that year.

== Plot ==
Mickey Mouse, Donald Duck, and Goofy are on a whaling boat in search of whales. Donald tries to eat a sandwich for lunch, but seagulls bother and harass him to get the sandwich and end up eating most of it. While Donald is preoccupied with fighting off the gulls, a pelican eats the remainder of the sandwich. Meanwhile, Mickey tries to pitch a bucket of water off the ship, but it keeps coming back to him, to his annoyance. Donald and Goofy spot a sleeping whale, but Goofy's efforts to shoot a harpoon keep failing because he doesn't have all the tools needed (at one point, he sets his own bottom on fire). He eventually succeeds in launching the anchor in place of the harpoon, but his foot gets caught in the attached line and when the anchor hits an iceberg he ends up hanging from the line above the whale's head.

Donald rushes to Goofy's rescue, but isn't fast enough and Goofy falls off the line, through the whale's blowhole, and ends up in the whale's mouth. Lighting a match so he can see better, Goofy inadvertently wakes the whale up and it starts coughing. A wave comes in through the whale's open mouth and washes Goofy around. He gets blown out of the whale's blowhole and falls back down, his head getting stuck in the blowhole. Meanwhile, Donald falls into the water and is chased by the angry whale back to the ship, where, after Donald is nearly eaten, the whale rams and destroys the ship. Mickey, Donald and Goofy fly through the air and land on a small raft made of the ship's debris. Goofy ends up with a fish in his hands, and, believing it is the whale, says, "Gosh, he must have shrunk!"

== Reception ==
Motion Picture Herald printed a letter from an exhibitor in their "What the Picture Did For Me" section, saying: "What a letdown. Disney must have been working on Ferdinand and made this during dinner hour. Not so hot". Another wrote: "A dandy. Very funny".

== Voice cast ==
- Mickey Mouse: N/A
- Donald Duck: Clarence Nash
- Goofy: Pinto Colvig

== Releases ==
- 1938 - theatrical release
- c. 1983 - Good Morning, Mickey!, episode #3 (TV)
- c. 1992 - Mickey's Mouse Tracks, episode #70 (TV)
- c. 1992 - Donald's Quack Attack, episode #21 (TV)
- 1997 - The Ink and Paint Club, episode #1.10: "Mickey, Donald and Goofy: Friends To the End" (TV)
- 2010 - Have a Laugh!, episode #14 (TV)

== Home media ==
The short was released on December 4, 2001, on Walt Disney Treasures: Mickey Mouse in Living Color.

Additional releases include:

- 1981 - "Mickey Mouse and Donald Duck Cartoon Collections Volume One" (VHS)
- 2010 - "Epic Mickey" (Bonus DVD)
- 2011 - "Have a Laugh! Volume Three" (DVD)

== See also ==
- Mickey Mouse (film series)
