= Thru the Mirror =

1936 Mickey Mouse cartoon

- Theatrical release poster, which uses the spelling "Through the Mirror".
- Directed by: David Hand
- Story by: William Cottrell; Joe Grant
- Produced by: Walt Disney
- Starring: Walt Disney; Pinto Colvig
- Music by: Frank Churchill; Leigh Harline; Paul J. Smith
- Animation by: Bob Wickersham; Dick Lundy; Leonard Sebring; Hardie Gramatky; Johnny Cannon; Ugo D'Orsi (effects)
- Color process: Technicolor
- Production company: Walt Disney Productions
- Distributed by: United Artists
- Release date: May 30, 1936
- Running time: 8 minutes (one reel)
- Country: United States
- Language: English

Thru the Mirror is a 1936 American animated short film directed by David Hand from a story by William Cottrell and Joe Grant. In this cartoon short, Mickey Mouse has a Through the Looking-Glass-parody-like dream that he travels through his mirror and enters a topsy-turvy world where everything is alive. While there, he engages in a Fred Astaire dance number with a pair of gloves and a pack of cards, until the cards chase him out of the bizarre world. Produced by Walt Disney Productions and released by United Artists, it was the 83rd Mickey Mouse short film to be released, the fourth of that year.

The title is written as Thru the Mirror on the title card, but the alternative spelling Through the Mirror is used on the poster for the film.

== Plot ==
Mickey falls asleep after reading Lewis Carroll's Through the Looking-Glass and dreams that he passes through a mirror into an alternate reality. Beyond the mirror, his furniture and possessions have come to life and he tangles with a rocking chair, a footstool and an umbrella while a nearby coat rack watches his actions in surprise. Mickey eats a magic walnut offered to him by a nutcracker after it cracks it open and eats the shell and it causes his stomach to spin uncontrollably before it expands and soon, his whole body grows until his head hits the ceiling and then suddenly shrinks to a tiny size.

The telephone answers itself and hauls Mickey up to the top of a desk with its cord. After a fruitless conversation, the phone uses its cord to amuse Mickey with a game of jump rope. The skipping turns into a tap dance and the radio turns itself on to play a tune. Grabbing a tiny top hat and a matchstick for a cane, Mickey performs a tap dance routine, using a regular-size top hat as his platform. He has another dance scene with a pair of gloves and then commandeers a marching set of playing cards. Mickey gets shuffled into the pack, which turns into another dance routine.

Mickey dances with the Queen of Hearts, until the King of Hearts notices and out of jealousy, goes to confront Mickey to win his lady back. After pulling the Queen aside, Mickey and the King fight each other, with Mickey using a sewing needle and button as a sword. After Mickey dunks the King into an inkwell, a rubber stamp takes him out and cleans him. In a final attempt to get rid of Mickey for good, the King summons the playing cards to chase him and the radio acts as an alarm. A set of cards emerge from the King's throne and another come out from a nearby desk drawer. Mickey hides in the sewing basket and uses a fountain pen to drench the cards in ink, but they are far too many of them. Eventually, the pen runs out of ink, allowing the cards to pig pile on Mickey, but he escapes in a torn sock. The cards spot him and continue the chase while throwing their pictures at him. Mickey then blows the cards away with an electric fan.

The telephone starts yelping for the police as it rings and rings. Swinging from a lamp cord and speeding across a globe, Mickey trips and falls into the sea, until he is ejected by an angry King Neptune. He regains his normal size in time to run back through the mirror, returning to the real world and rejoining his sleeping self. The ringing turns out to be Mickey's alarm clock, so Mickey throws it into a drawer and goes back to sleep.

== Releases ==
- 1936 - theatrical release
- 1956 - Disneyland, episode #3.8: "The Plausible Impossible" (TV)
- c. 1972 - The Mouse Factory, episode #27: "Mickey Mouse" (TV)
- c. 1983 - Good Morning, Mickey!, episode #4 (TV)
- c. 1992 - Mickey's Mouse Tracks, episode #52 (TV)
- 1997 - The Ink and Paint Club, episode #1.50: "Storyteller Mickey" (TV)
- 2011 - Have a Laugh!, episode #23 (TV)

== Home media ==
The short was released on December 4, 2001 on Walt Disney Treasures: Mickey Mouse in Living Color.

Additional releases include:

- 1981 - "Mickey Mouse and Donald Duck Cartoon Collections Volume One" (VHS)
- c. 1988 - Mickey's Magical World (VHS)
- 1998 - "The Spirit of Mickey" (VHS)
- 2004/2011 - bonus on DVD release of Alice in Wonderland (DVD)
- 2009 - Walt Disney Animation Collection: Mickey and the Beanstalk (DVD)
- 2018 - Celebrating Mickey (Blu-ray/DVD/Digital)
- 2023 - Mickey & Minnie: 10 Classic Shorts - Volume 1 (Blu-ray/DVD/Digital)

== Legacy ==
- This cartoon was featured, and referenced, in the 2002 video game Disney's Magical Mirror Starring Mickey Mouse.
- Some elements from the cartoon like the cards and the opening were used in Epic Mickey. There's even a recreation of the short in a form of mini side-scrolling level, where it acts like a portal to Ostown.
- The song during the magic gloves dance scene was used for the Walt Disney Mini Classics promos during their movie's end.
- The melody during Mickey's marching with the cards in the middle of the film is a jazzed-up version of the music used in another 1932 cartoon classic, Santa’s Workshop. The music theme is based on Franz Schubert: Military March Op. 51 No. 1, in D Major.

== See also ==
- Mickey Mouse (film series)
