= How to Swim =

How to Swim or how to swim may refer to:

- How to Swim (1945 film), a cartoon by Walt Disney Productions
- How to Swim (2018 film), an Israeli short drama film written and directed by Noa Gusakov
- How to Swim (band), a pop/rock band from Glasgow, United Kingdom
- Ability to swim, the ability in a range of organisms to propel motion through a liquid medium
- Human swimming, the self-propulsion of a person through water for survival, recreation, sport, or exercise
- Swimming (sport), a water based sport
