= Mickey's Magical World =

1988 film

- Narrated by: Eddie Carroll as Jiminy Cricket
- Production company: Walt Disney Home Video
- Distributed by: Buena Vista Home Video
- Release date: May 31, 1988 (United States)
- Running time: 27 minutes
- Country: United States
- Language: English

Mickey's Magical World is a home video compilation originally released on May 31, 1988, as part of the Walt Disney Mini-Classics series and primarily to promote Mickey Mouse's 60th anniversary campaign.

== Summary ==
Jiminy Cricket hosted this compilation with clips from the following Disney animated shorts:

- Thru the Mirror (1936)
- The Worm Turns (1937)
- Lonesome Ghosts (1937)
- The Band Concert (1935)
- Gulliver Mickey (1934) (colorized version)
- Magician Mickey (1937)
- The Sorcerer's Apprentice (1940) (from Fantasia and later used in Fantasia 2000)

In between the cartoon short clips featuring Mickey Mouse, clips from This is Your Life, Donald Duck, Pinocchio, Orphan's Benefit, The Mickey Mouse Club and From All of Us to All of You are also used.

== See also ==
- The Spirit of Mickey - similar in content
