= Mickey's Delayed Date =

1947 Mickey Mouse cartoon

- Theatrical release poster
- Directed by: Charles Nichols
- Story by: Art Scott
- Produced by: Walt Disney
- Starring: Walt Disney; Ruth Clifford; Pinto Colvig
- Music by: Oliver Wallace
- Animation by: Jerry Hathcock; George Kreisl; George Nicholas; Jack Boyd; Max Cox
- Layouts by: Karl Karpé
- Backgrounds by: Art Landy
- Color process: Technicolor
- Production company: Walt Disney Productions
- Distributed by: RKO Radio Pictures
- Release date: October 3, 1947
- Running time: 6:54
- Country: United States
- Language: English

Mickey's Delayed Date is a 1947 American animated short film produced by Walt Disney Productions, distributed by RKO Radio Pictures and released on October 3, 1947. The film was directed by Charles Nichols and was animated by Jerry Hathcock, George Kreisl, George Nicholas, Harry Holt, Bob Youngquist, Marvin Woodward, and Max Cox with effects animation by Jack Boyd and Andy Engman. It was the 120th short in the Mickey Mouse film series to be released and the only one produced that year.

== Plot ==
Minnie Mouse is calling Mickey Mouse to remind him about their date, which he has totally forgotten about while sleeping on the couch. With the help of Pluto, Mickey gets dressed for the date, but loses the tickets to the dance on his way out the door. Pluto takes the tickets to Mickey, after his tuxedo has just been ruined by the water from a passing car, and then Minnie arrives and tells him he has a cute costume for the "hard times" costume party.

== Voice cast ==
- Mickey Mouse: Walt Disney
- Minnie Mouse: Ruth Clifford
- Pluto: Pinto Colvig

== Releases ==
- 1947 - Theatrical release
- 1978 - "Mickey Mouse Jubilee Show" (TV)
- c. 1983 - Good Morning, Mickey!, episode #20 (TV)
- c. 1992 - Mickey's Mouse Tracks, episode #75 (TV)
- 2010 - Have a Laugh!, episode #9 (TV)

== Home media ==
The short was released on May 18, 2004, on Walt Disney Treasures: Mickey Mouse in Living Color, Volume Two: 1939-Today.

Additional releases include:

- 1984 - "Cartoon Classics - Limited Gold Edition: Minnie" (VHS)
- 1995 - "Love Tales" (VHS)
- 2004 - "Mickey and Minnie's Sweetheart Stories" (DVD)
- 2006 - "Classic Cartoons Favorites: Best Pals - Mickey and Minnie" (DVD)
- 2011 - Have a Laugh! Volume Three (DVD)
- 2023 - "Mickey & Minnie: 10 Classic Shorts - Volume 1" (Blu-ray/DVD/Digital)

== See also ==
- Mickey Mouse (film series)
