= Minnie's Yoo-Hoo =

1929 song by Walt Disney and Carl Stalling

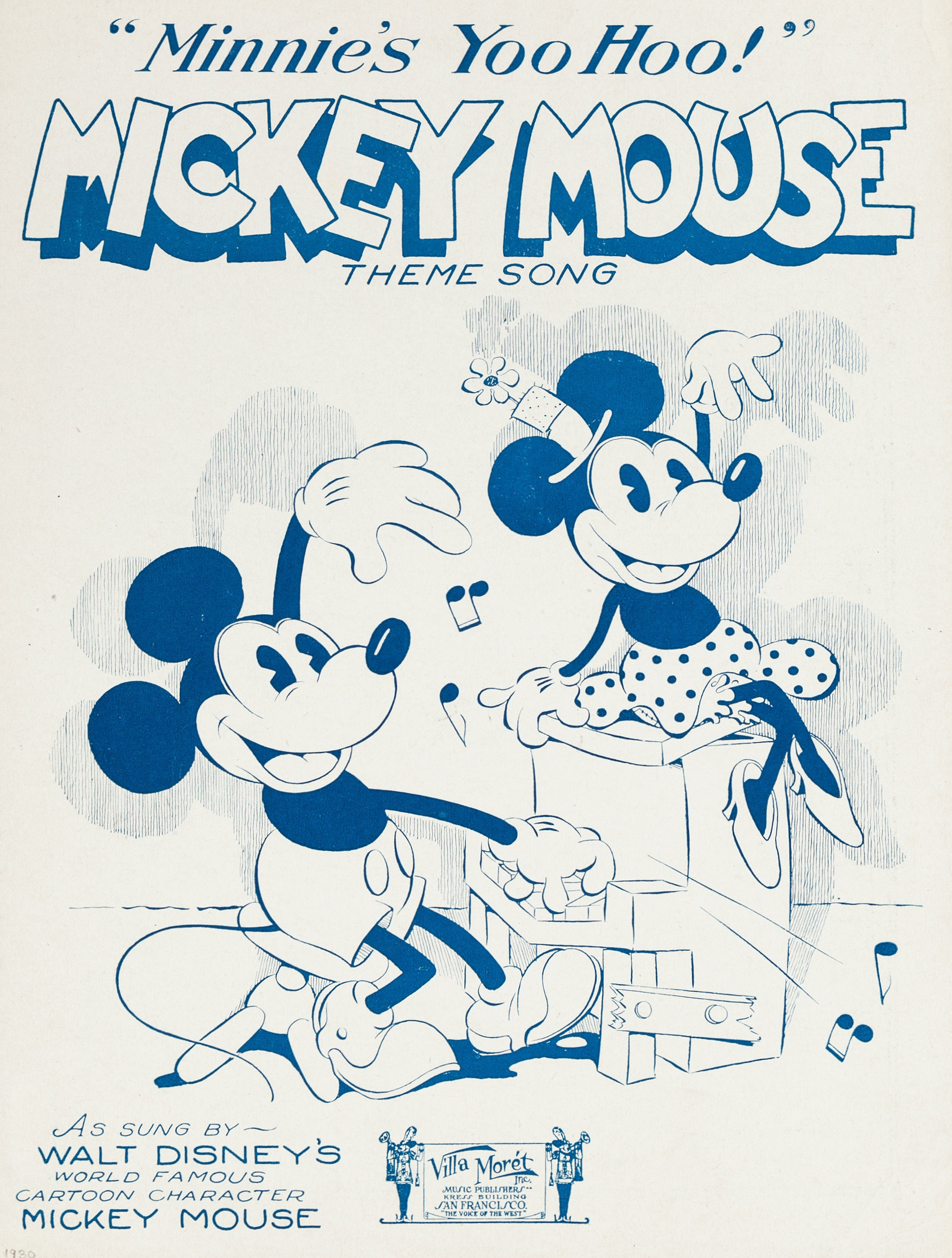
Sheet music cover featuring Mickey and Minnie (1930)

"Minnie's Yoo Hoo" is a song introduced in the 1929 Mickey Mouse cartoon Mickey's Follies. The song was composed by Walt Disney and Carl Stalling. It was the first Disney song to be released on sheet music.

The song as performed in Mickey's Follies

The song, sung by Mickey Mouse, praises his girlfriend Minnie, accompanied by other animals. In Mickey's Follies, Mickey's singing voice was provided by an anonymous studio employee; in the early days, Walt Disney was not yet the exclusive voice for Mickey.

An instrumental version was used as the opening theme song for all of the Mickey Mouse cartoons from The Jazz Fool (1929) to Mickey's Mechanical Man (1933), and was also used as the theme song of the original 1930s Mickey Mouse Clubs in theaters. The song has been popular on records. The song is referenced on the October 28, 1930 panel of the daily Mickey Mouse comic strip.

It was played over the credits to Disney's 1972 television series The Mouse Factory, and was also used as the theme song of Don Ramón in El Chavo del Ocho and sketch of Chómpiras in Los Caquitos.
