= Hannes Schroll =

Austrian alpine skier

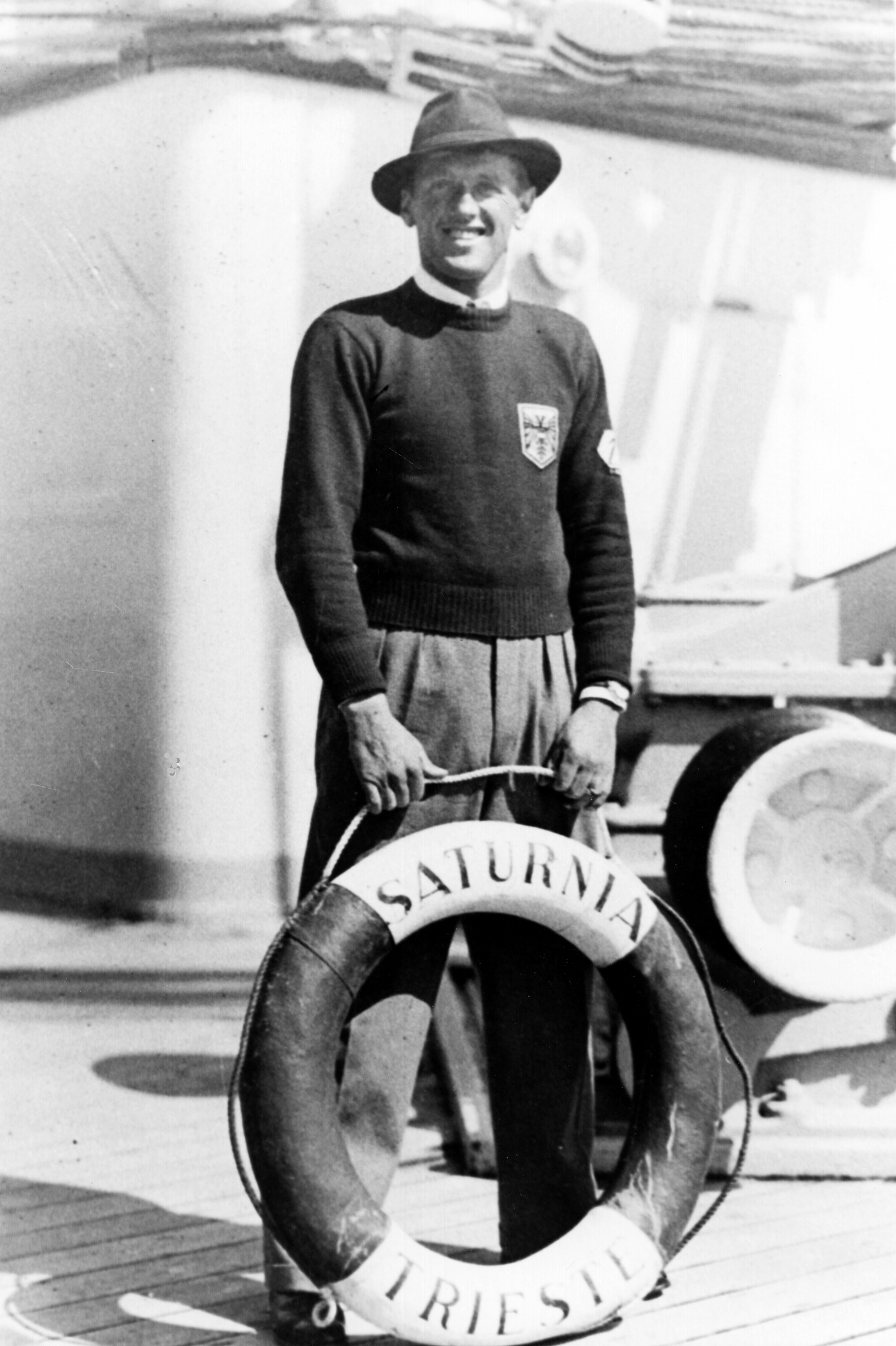
- Hannes Schroll on board the ship the Saturnia coming from Trieste, Italy

Personal information
- Born: 13 June 1909 Wörgl, Austria
- Died: 5 April 1985 (aged 75) Woodside, California, U.S.

Sport
- Sport: Skiing

Hannes Schroll (June 13, 1909 – April 5, 1985) was an Austrian Alpine ski racer and founder of the Sugar Bowl Ski Resort in Norden, California.

== Early years ==
Schroll grew up in an Austrian village near Salzburg, called Bischofshofen. Later on he began helping his mother run a small pension in the mountain village of Alpbach in the Tyrol east of Kitzbuhel, attending to guest. After his father fashioned a pair of barrel-stave skis for him, he won his first village race, receiving his first pair of hickory skis as a prize. Unconfirmed reports by Newspaper and Magazine articles have stated that Schroll had won up to one hundred ski races before arriving in America.

== Skiing career ==
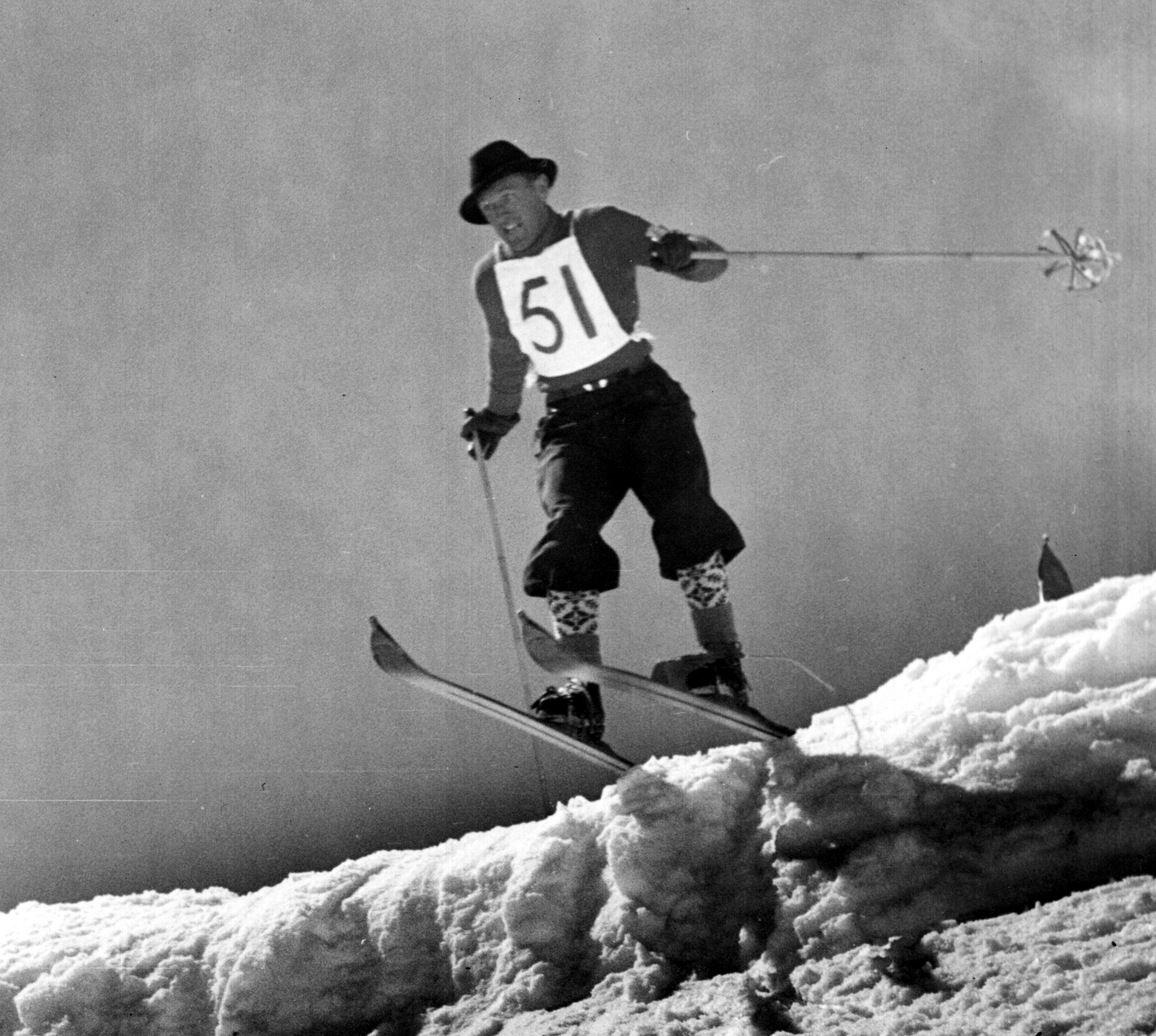
Hannes Schroll Skiing downhill off the upper edge of Edith Creek Basin in the 1935 U.S. Alpine Championship held in Mount Rainier National Park Washington

Schroll has been characterized as being very charismatic, funny and a larger-than-life social person that would often be heard Yodeling during skiing competitions. After winning the steepest race in the Italian Dolomites in 1934, the Marmolata, he was elected by Chancellor Kurt von Schuschnigg to represent Austria at the 1935 U.S. National Downhill Championships and given a ticket to come to America. When he arrived by boat, he did not speak any English.

Schroll then went on to win both the U.S. National Downhill and Slalom open combined category at Mt. Rainier, Washington, in 1935, on wooden skis. It was the first international race of its kind, held in the US to include both European and American skiers. Seven thousand people attended that year, as radio broadcasters carried reports of the events and the skiing conditions all across the US. Schroll was awarded the Silver Skis trophy.

Donald Tresidder who was park president of Yosemite at the time, was a spectator at Mt. Rainier that particular day and invited Schroll to become the new ski school director in Yosemite at Badger Pass, in California, by hiring Schroll on the spot. Schrolls popularity at Yosemite and among skiers, more than doubled the number of skiers the next year coming to ski at Badger Pass. Schrolls popularity grew so much that photographer Ansel Adams once included a picture of Schroll, which he had taken in Yosemite of Schroll, for advertising.

It's been said that Schroll had an Austrian Accent and would admonish students in the following way while giving them skiing instructions: "My zhtudent, you are zhtanding like a Chrizhtmaz tree! You are going to have to bend your kneez zooner or later, zo vhy not zave uz both zome time by bending zem now?".

== Sugar Bowl Ski Resort ==
Schroll opened the Sugar Bowl Ski Resort after an invitation by his friend Bill Klein came for him to look at some property in the Sierra Nevada that went on the market in 1937. Schroll became president of the Sugar Bowl Corporation with the financial assistance from Hamilton McCaughey a local realtor and ice-skating champion George Stiles and several families that assisted in several other ways. Stocks were sold in the company to raise enough funding to build a ski lodge, a chair lift and several chalets. Schroll is noted as playing a vital part of Sugar Bowls success by greeting guests and even entertaining them in the lodge in the evenings. Schroll also coached Dick Buek at Sugar Bowl when he was a youth, who later went on to compete in the 1952 Winter Olympics in Oslo and he was then later inducted into the U.S. Ski and Snowboard Hall of Fame in 1974. Schroll himself was inducted into U.S. Ski and Snowboard Hall of Fame in 1966.

Walt Disney recorded yodels of Schroll for the animated short Disney cartoon The Art of Skiing in which Goofy goes to Sugar Bowl to learn how to ski. The yodel that Goofy makes in the cartoon has come to be known as the Goofy holler.

== Personal life ==
Schroll married stockholder Jerome Hill's sister Maud Hill in 1943, she died 18 years after his death, she was 94. They had two children together, a daughter in 1944 and a son in 1947. Schroll lived in his Chalet at Sugar Bowl along with his wife Maud until moving to a small farm house in Palo Alto, California. Later on moving to a larger ranch in Hollister, California where he raised and trained race horses until his death in 1985 at the age of 75.
