= Diane Michelle =

American voice actress

- Born: Los Angeles, California, United States
- Education: University of California, Santa Barbara
- Occupations: Voice actress, impressionist, painter, guitarist
- Years active: 1982–present

Diane Michelle is an American voice actress who has voiced Daisy Duck in several 1980s and 1990s Disney projects such as The Spirit of Mickey, Mickey Mouse Works and Mickey's Once Upon a Christmas.

== Early life ==
Michelle is a Los Angeles native and a graduate of the University of California, Santa Barbara.

== Career ==
In 1984, Michelle formed the Goils, a group of three singers in World War II uniforms who emulate The Andrews Sisters but include jazz, swing, and popular tunes in their repertoire. The group has appeared on the Queen Mary in Long Beach, spent one year as resident performers at Las Vegas' New York, New York, and toured Japan four times.

She performs in many TV and radio commercials, including as the voice of Olive Oyl in commercials for Prego Spaghetti Sauce. Her numerous television V.O. credits include The Simpsons, Harvey Birdman, Attorney at Law (as Jane Jetson and Orbitty) and The West Wing. She has also done voices for many motion pictures, including RV (as the voice of the R.V.), The Little Mermaid II: Return to the Sea, and The Savages. Michelle is the dubbed voice of Dianne Feinstein in the feature film Milk.

In 2002, Michelle launched a one-woman show at the Theme Building at LAX portraying spaceship captain/diva Va Va LaVoom, her character from Elmo Aardvark.

Her voice work also appears in Happy Feet, Wings, Star Wars Galactic Battlegrounds, Son of Batman, Crayon Shin-chan, and Kiki's Delivery Service. Michelle has voiced multiple characters in video games such as The Amazing Spider-Man 2 (where she voiced Sally Field's rendition of Aunt May), Mass Effect, EverQuest II, and Diablo II.

== Filmography ==
=== Film ===
Year	Title	Role	Notes
1992	Golgo 13: The Professional	Rita	English dub
1999	Mickey's Once Upon a Christmas	Daisy Duck	"Stuck on Christmas" segment and finale song only
2012	Wings	Rosie	English dub
2014	Son of Batman	Francine Langstrom	Direct-to-video
2017	Top Cat Begins	Tourist	

=== Television ===
Year	Title	Role	Notes
1992–94	Batman: The Animated Series	Candance	3 episodes
1998	Pinky and the Brain	Mousey Galore	Episode: "To Russia with Lab Mice"
1998–2000	Superman: The Animated Series	Lashina	4 episodes
1999	Mickey Mouse Works	Daisy Duck	5 episodes
2001	Invader Zim	Avon Lady, Mrs. Slunchy, Earth Mother	Episode: "Walk of Doom"
2002	As Told by Ginger	Dr. Fondfeelings	2 episodes
2003	Crayon Shin-chan	Shin Chan Nohara	Lead role, 52 episodes, Phuuz English dub
2004	Harvey Birdman, Attorney at Law	Jane Jetson, Orbitty	Episode: "Back to the Present"
2004–05	Hi Hi Puffy AmiYumi	Courtney, Nurse, Veronica West, Monet Renoir	4 episodes
2009	Ben 10: Alien Force	Cosmic Mom	Episode: "Busy Box"
2017	The Tom and Jerry Show	Snotti, Nanny	Episode: "Pillow Case"
2021	Tom and Jerry in New York	Old Lady, Mrs. Vandarkashian	2 episodes

=== Video games ===
Year	Title	Role	Notes
2002	Minority Report: Everybody Runs	Iris Hineman	
2007	Mass Effect	Mira, Dr. Warren, Destiny Ascension Computer	
2011	The Elder Scrolls V: Skyrim	Idgrod Ravencrone, Grelod the Kind, Additional Voices	
2013	Saints Row IV	President	
2014	The Amazing Spider-Man 2	May Parker	
2015	Saints Row: Gat out of Hell	President	
2017	Dishonored: Death of the Outsider	Lena Rosewyn	
