= The Mouse Factory =

- Created by: Ward Kimball
- Country of origin: United States
- Original language: English
- No. of seasons: 2
- No. of episodes: 43

Production
- Running time: 22 minutes
- Production company: Walt Disney Productions

Original release
- Network: Syndication
- Release: January 26, 1972 – March 5, 1973

Related
- Good Morning, Mickey!

The Mouse Factory is an American syndicated television series produced by Walt Disney Productions and created by Ward Kimball, that ran from 1972 to 1973. It showed clips from various Disney cartoons and movies, hosted by celebrity guests (credited as being "Mickey's Friend"), including Charles Nelson Reilly, Jo Anne Worley, Wally Cox, Johnny Brown, Phyllis Diller, Joe Flynn, Annette Funicello, Shari Lewis and Hush Puppy, Lamb Chop, Dom DeLuise, Don Knotts and many more visiting the Mouse Factory and interacting with the walk-around Disney characters from the Disney theme parks. The series was later rerun on the Disney Channel in the 1980s and 1990s.

The theme played over the previews of each episode was a fast instrumental version of "Whistle While You Work" from Snow White and the Seven Dwarfs.

== Ending credits ==
To start the ending credits, the series depicts Mickey Mouse in a biplane. He flies across the screen carrying a banner that reads "the end". A large ape, resembling King Kong, promptly swipes said plane as well as Mickey out of thin air, dropping them in his mouth and devouring them. In season 2, this was changed to Donald Duck uttering the phrase "it won't work".

The song played over the end credits is "Minnie's Yoo Hoo", the theme song from the original Mickey Mouse Clubs that met in theaters starting in 1929. The version used in the series originated in a 1968 episode of The Wonderful World of Disney celebrating Mickey's birthday.

== Premise ==
The Mouse Factory mixes live-action with animation and features a different theme in each episode. Each episode is hosted by a celebrity guest, who plays a new character and interacts with Disney characters such as Mickey, Donald, Goofy and Pluto (appearing in costume form as they do in theme parks), among others. In addition, each episode features several classic short films and clips of feature films (about three short films and clips in each episode).

== Records ==
Disneyland Records released two vinyl 12-inch LP records and three seven-inch 33 1/3 rpm to tie in with series, all containing previously released recordings and no new soundtrack material from the TV show. The Mouse Factory Presents Mickey and His Friends was an LP compilation of songs and sketches. Stories and Songs from The Mouse Factory contained four edited "read-along" recordings of tales seen on the show. The three seven-inch records each presented four songs featuring Mickey Mouse, Donald Duck and Goofy.

== Cancellation ==
Due to low ratings and limited distribution, the series was cancelled after its second season.

== List of episodes ==
43 episodes were produced, including:

=== Season 1 (1972) ===
#	Title	Host	Cartoons Featured	Airdate
1	Vacations	Charles Nelson Reilly	Tea For Two Hundred (1948); Grin And Bear It (1954); Father's Day Off (1953); Grand Canyonscope (1954); Lake Titicaca (1955)	January 26, 1972
2	Women’s Lib	JoAnne Worley	A Symposium On Popular Songs (1962) ("Rutabaga Rag" segment); Fantasia (1940) ("Dance Of The Hours" segment); Make Mine Music (1946) ("Willie The Operatic Whale" segment)	February 2, 1972
3	Folk Tale Favorites	Johnny Brown	The Tortoise And The Hare (1935); Song Of The South (1946) ("Laughing Place" segment); Brave Little Tailor (1938); The Ugly Duckling (1939); Old King Cole (1933)	February 9, 1972
4	Spooks and Magic	Phyllis Diller	Lonesome Ghosts (1937); The Sword In The Stone (1963) ("Dueling Wizards" segment); Trick Or Treat (1952)	February 16, 1972
5	Physical Fitness	Don Knotts	Goofy Gymnastics (1949); Reason And Emotion (1943) ("Diet Argument" clip); No Smoking (1951); Donald's Off Day (1944); Wide Open Spaces (1947); Snow White And The Seven Dwarfs (1937) ("Dwarfs Cleaning Up" clip)	February 23, 1972
6	The Great Outdoors	Dom DeLuise	How To Fish (1942); Donald's Garden (1942); Foul Hunting (1947)	March 1, 1972
7	Water Sports	Joe Flynn	How To Be A Sailor (1944); Boat Builders (1938); How To Swim (1942); Hawaiian Holiday (1937); Aquamania (1961)	March 8, 1972
8	Man at Work	John Byner	Dragon Around (1954); Hold That Pose (1950); Inferior Decorator (1948); Moving Day (1936) ("Goofy Moving Piano" clip); Fire Chief (1940)	March 15, 1972
9	Music	Skiles and Henderson	Dumbo (1941) ("Casey Junior" segment); Cured Duck (1945); Three Little Wolves (1936); Melody Time (1948) ("Bumble Boogie" segment); Mickey's Follies (1929); Mickey's Amateurs (1937); Toot, Whistle, Plunk And Boom (1953)	March 22, 1972
10	Interplanetary Travel	Jonathan Winters	Man In Space (1955) (Clips); Mars And Beyond (1957) (Clips)	March 29, 1972
11	Homeowners	Jim Backus	Home Made Home (1951); How To Have An Accident In The Home (1956) (Clips); Up A Tree (1955); Mickey's Trailer (1938); The New Neighbor (1953)	April 5, 1972
12	Spectator Sports	Charles Nelson Reilly	They're Off (1948); Double Dribble (1946); Canvas Back Duck (1953); The Olympic Champ (1942); Football (Now And Then) (1953)	April 12, 1972
13	Horses	JoAnne Worley	How To Ride A Horse (1941); Fantasia (1940) ("Pastoral Symphony" segment); The Adventures Of Ichabod And Mr. Toad (1949) ("Cyril Proudbottom" and "The Headless Horseman" segments); Mickey's Polo Team (1936)	April 19, 1972
14	Aviation	Johnny Brown	Victory Through Air Power (1943) (Clip); The Flying Jalopy (1943); Goofy's Glider (1940); Test Pilot Donald (1951); Dumbo (1941) ("Dumbo Flying" clip)	April 26, 1972
15	Back to Nature	Wally Cox	The Legend Of Johnny Appleseed (1948); Make Mine Music (1946) ("The Martins And The Coys" segment); Pinocchio (1940) ("Ticking Clocks" clip); Clock Cleaners (1937); Mother Goose Goes Hollywood (1938) (Clip); Eyes In Outer Space (1959) (Clip); Melody (1953) (Clip); Magic Highway, U.S.A. (1958) (Clip); Alpine Climbers (1936)	May 3, 1972
16	Bullfighting to Bullfrogs	Pat Buttram	Ferdinand The Bull (1938) (Clip); Baggage Buster (1941); Two-Gun Mickey (1934)	May 10, 1972
17	Sports	Pat Paulsen	How To Play Golf (1944); How To Play Baseball (1942); How To Play Football (1944); Hockey Homicide (1945); The Art Of Skiing (1941)	May 17, 1972

=== Season 2 (1972–73) ===
#	Title	Host	Airdate
1	Alligators	Johnny Brown	September 11, 1972
2	Paul Bunyan	Jim Backus	September 18, 1972
3	Bullfighting	Bill Dana	September 25, 1972
4	Knighthood	Henry Gibson	October 2, 1972
5	Pluto	John Astin	October 9, 1972
6	Goliath II	Kurt Russell	October 16, 1972
7	The Mouse Show	Dave Madden	October 23, 1972
8	Cats	Shari Lewis and Hush Puppy	October 30, 1972
9	Ben Franklin	Wally Cox	November 6, 1972
10	Mickey Mouse	Annette Funicello	November 13, 1972
11	Lions	Henry Gibson	November 20, 1972
12	Consciences	Harry Morgan	November 27, 1972
13	Noah’s Ark	Bill Dana	December 4, 1972
14	Hunting	John Astin	December 11, 1972
15	Sports	Nipsey Russell	December 18, 1972
16	Tugboats	Dave Madden	December 25, 1972
17	Automobiles	Ken Berry	January 1, 1973
18	Trains	Harry Morgan	January 8, 1973
19	Homes	Jim Backus	January 15, 1973
20	The Reluctant Dragon	Wally Cox	January 22, 1973
21	Wheels	Johnny Brown	January 29, 1973
22	Winter Fun	Kurt Russell	February 5, 1973
23	Penguins	Annette Funicello	February 12, 1973
24	Elephants	Nipsey Russell	February 19, 1973
25	Mickey and the Beanstalk	Shari Lewis and Lamb Chop	February 26, 1973
26	Dancing	Ken Berry	March 5, 1973
