= How to Swim (1942 film) =

1942 film by Jack Kinney

- How to Swim poster
- Directed by: Jack Kinney
- Produced by: Walt Disney
- Starring: Pinto Colvig
- Narrated by: John McLeish
- Music by: Darrell Calker
- Animation by: John Sibley; Emery Hawkins
- Color process: Technicolor
- Production company: Walt Disney Productions
- Distributed by: RKO Radio Pictures
- Release date: October 23, 1942 (USA)
- Running time: 8 min (one reel)
- Language: English

How to Swim is a cartoon made by Walt Disney Productions in 1942, featuring Goofy.

== Plot ==
The cartoon opens with Goofy demonstrating the bathing suit and using a piano stool to demonstrate swimming techniques, such as the windmill stroke, the Australian crawl, the side stroke, and the breaststroke. As Goofy is doing this, he is unaware that he, using the stool, has exited his house and, with the help of a street light, got back in his house, but accidentally fallen in the bath.

Next, Goofy demonstrates changing into swimming gear in a beach locker, which is too small for him. As he is trying to get on his swimming gear, he knocks over all the other beach lockers, and the one he is in falls into the sea. Goofy exits the beach locker and has his lunch while in the sea, with the aid of a bubble surrounding him. Goofy accidentally pops the bubble by trying to set down his umbrella, and gets cramps due to him eating in the sea, and sinks into the sea.

Goofy demonstrates diving with the help of a chart. As Goofy is about to jump, he gets caught on the springboard, and the chart uses him as a boost. Goofy is lifted into the air and falls into the pool, which does not have any water in it.

Finally, Goofy shows off surf bathing, as he jumps into the water, a wave pushes him back onto the beach and he lands on an anchor, which pops his ring. Another wave pushes him onto a slingshot-like structure, which launches him far out to sea before he lands on a desert island.

The cartoon ends with Goofy, still on the desert island, surrounded by mermaids.

== Voice cast ==
- Goofy: Pinto Colvig
- Narrator: John McLeish

== Releases ==
- 1942 - theatrical release
- 1964 - Walt Disney's Wonderful World of Color, episode #10.23: "In Shape with Von Drake" (TV)
- 1972 - The Mouse Factory, episode #1.7: "Water Sports" (TV)
- 1976 - "Superstar Goofy" (TV)
- c. 1983 - Good Morning, Mickey!, episode #64 (TV)
- 1991 - aired on ITV in the UK as part of the Children's ITV Summer Morning programming presented by Glenn Kinsey (TV).
- c. 1992 - Mickey's Mouse Tracks, episode #66 (TV)
- c. 1992 - Donald's Quack Attack, episode #33 (TV)
- 1993 - The Adventures of Mickey and Donald, episode #18 (TV)
- 1997 - The Ink and Paint Club, episode #3: "Sports Goofy" (TV)

== Home media ==
The short was released on December 2, 2002, on Walt Disney Treasures: The Complete Goofy.

Additional releases include:

- 1981 - "Goofy Over Sports" (VHS)
- 1983 - "Cartoon Classics: More Sport Goofy" (VHS)
- 2005 - "Classic Cartoon Favorites: Starring Goofy" (DVD)
