= Wings (2012 film) =

- Theatrical release poster
- Russian: От винта 3D
- Directed by: Olga Lopato
- Written by: Armen Adilkhanyan; Tilek Cherikov; Timur Cherikov; Mychal Simka
- Produced by: Georgi Nersian; Gevorg Nersisyan; Mychal Simka
- Starring: Josh Duhamel; Hilary Duff; Rob Schneider; Jesse McCartney; Tom Skerritt
- Music by: Gary Miller
- Distributed by: MGN Paradise
- Release dates: August 19, 2012 (Russia); November 26, 2013 (USA)
- Running time: 88 minutes
- Country: Russia
- Languages: Russian; English

Wings (Russian: От винта 3D) is a 2012 Russian animated film directed by Olga Lopato. The English cast consists of Josh Duhamel, Hilary Duff, Rob Schneider, Jesse McCartney, and Tom Skerritt.

== Plot ==
During the Super Wings Cup competition, tragedy strikes before the eyes of numerous spectators: a Grad fighter jet, one of two contenders for the championship, crashes while performing a complex aerobatic maneuver.

A year has passed. A modest agricultural aviation worker, a young Su-27 aircraft proudly named Ace, dreams of a career as an air ace. Unexpectedly, his dream begins to come true: by a twist of fate, he finds himself included in the team participating in the upcoming air show and is apprenticed to experienced pilots who undertake to prepare him for the competition in the remaining few weeks. His trainer is the stern, wise, and experienced Colonel. Ace also gains a friend—a mischievous young eagle named Dodo.

The day of the competition approaches. However, Ace completely forgets about his training when he falls in love with the charming light aircraft Windy. She, too, is not indifferent to him. Ace's rival in the upcoming competition, the arrogant and cruel fighter pilot Cyclone, takes advantage of this: he threatens Windy to distract Ace from his training by any means necessary.

== Cast ==
- Josh Duhamel as Ace
- Hilary Duff as Windy
- Rob Schneider as Dodo
- Jesse McCartney as Cyclone
- Jesse Pruett as Hail
- Tom Skerritt as Colonel
- Jeff Berg as Blue Baron
- Gregg Berger as Announcer Andy, Major Munson
- Dave Boat as Davidson
- Benjamin Diskin as Mr. Cumberbun, Patrick, Wicketts
- Ron Fleischman as Yellow Tractor
- Wes Hubbard as Hawk
- Diane Michelle as Rosie
- Scott Whyte as Red Tractor, Rinaldo

== Sequel ==
There is a spin-off to this film called Wings: Sky Force Heroes which was released in 2014. Josh Duhamel, Hilary Duff, and Tom Skerritt reprise their roles from the film with Rob Schneider and Jesse McCartney doing different roles and they are joined by Dallas Lovato and Russell Peters.

A sequel titled Wings 2 (Russian: От винта 2) was released on April 15, 2021.
