= The Spirit of Mickey =

1998 Compilation of Mickey Mouse Shorts

- Written by: Bonnie Peterson
- Produced by: Harry Arends; Phil Savenick; Darryl Harris
- Starring: Wayne Allwine; Tony Anselmo; Corey Burton; Jeannie Elias; Bill Farmer; Diane Michelle; Russi Taylor
- Edited by: Darryl Harris; Robert P. Schneider
- Music by: Andrew Belling
- Distributed by: Walt Disney Home Video
- Release date: July 14, 1998
- Running time: 83 mins
- Country: United States
- Language: English

The Spirit of Mickey is an American animated direct-to-video anthology film, produced and released by Walt Disney Home Video on July 14, 1998. It features clips from The Mickey Mouse Club, The Wonderful World of Disney, The 60th Academy Awards and A Goofy Movie, in the introductory scene, and some of the namesake character's shorts, including The Band Concert, Lend a Paw, Mr. Mouse Takes a Trip and Steamboat Willie.

== Summary ==
The framing devices are centered on Mickey Mouse and his friends hosting an event at which they present some of Mickey's greatest cartoons to an audience of orphans, using archival footage from The Mickey Mouse Club, Disney's Wonderful World of Color, The 60th Academy Awards, A Goofy Movie, and various Mickey Mouse and Donald Duck shorts. None of the shorts were shown with their original title cards, instead, the titles were shown on the corner of the screen, disappearing after a few seconds, with an exception for the final short, Steamboat Willie.

== Overview ==
=== Cartoons ===
#	Title	Release date	Director
1	The Band Concert	February 23, 1935	Walt Disney/Wilfred Jackson
2	Thru the Mirror	May 30, 1936	David Hand
3	Lend a Paw	October 3, 1941	Clyde Geronimi
4	Orphan's Picnic	February 15, 1936	Ben Sharpsteen
5	The Worm Turns	January 2, 1937	Ben Sharpsteen
6	Mickey's Surprise Party (redubbed)	February 18, 1939	Hamilton Luske
7	Mickey and the Seal	December 3, 1948	Charles August Nichols
8	Mickey's Trailer	May 6, 1938	Ben Sharpsteen
9	Canine Caddy	May 30, 1941	Clyde Geronimi
10	Mr. Mouse Takes a Trip	November 1, 1940	Clyde Geronimi
11	Steamboat Willie	November 18, 1928	Walt Disney/Ub Iwerks

== Voice cast ==
- Wayne Allwine as Mickey Mouse
  - Walt Disney and Jimmy MacDonald as Mickey Mouse (via archival audio, uncredited)
- Tony Anselmo as Donald Duck
  - Clarence Nash as Donald Duck, additional voices (via archival audio, uncredited)
- Bill Farmer as Goofy and Pluto
  - Pinto Colvig as Goofy, Pluto, additional voices (via archival audio, uncredited)
- Corey Burton as Ludwig Von Drake
- Diane Michelle as Daisy Duck
- Russi Taylor as Minnie Mouse
  - Marcellite Garner as Minnie Mouse, additional voices (via archival audio, uncredited)
- Jeannie Elias as Max

== Production ==
The compilation was produced in celebration of the 70th anniversary of Mickey Mouse. Stan Deneroff, then Director of Programming and Product Development for Walt Disney Studios Home Entertainment selected older cartoons from the Disney archives which would then be presented together with new interstitial segments of rotoscoped Disney characters setting up and introducing each short. While Mickey was not the primary focus in all the cartoons, with some of the included shorts including Mickey as part of an ensemble or a supporting capacity, Deneroff felt it was important to show Mickey in various positions throughout his run including in relation to his co-stars.

Consumers could receive an instant $5 rebate after purchasing the video and two Sea & Ski suncare products, and a $5 mail-in rebate with the purchase of five Expressions from Hallmark cards.
