= Mickey's Follies =

1929 film by Ub Iwerks and Wilfred Jackson

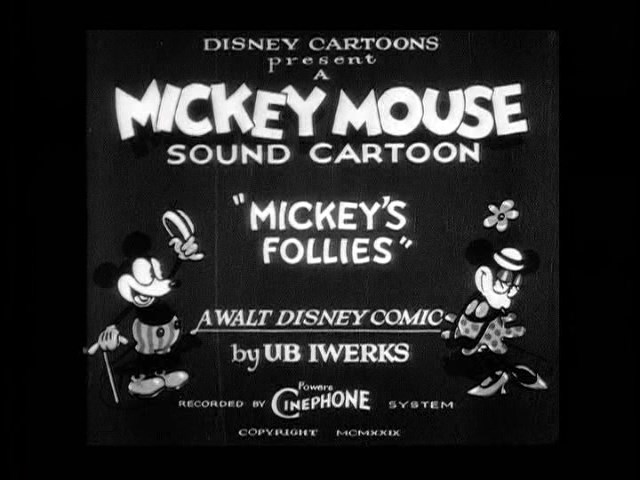
- Directed by: Ub Iwerks; Wilfred Jackson
- Produced by: Walt Disney
- Starring: Walt Disney
- Music by: Carl Stalling
- Animation by: Ub Iwerks
- Color process: Black and white
- Production company: Disney Cartoons
- Distributed by: Celebrity Productions
- Release date: August 28, 1929
- Running time: 6 minutes
- Country: United States
- Language: English

Mickey's Follies is a 1929 American animated short film directed by Ub Iwerks and Wilfred Jackson. It is the tenth film of the Mickey Mouse film series and the first film to be directed by Jackson. It was released on August 28, 1929 by Celebrity Productions. Columbia Pictures reissued the film after Walt Disney Productions switched distributors.

This cartoon revolves around Mickey singing the song "Minnie's Yoo-Hoo", which was later used as the opening theme for all of the Mickey Mouse cartoons from The Jazz Fool (1929) until Mickey's Mechanical Man (1933). Mickey's singing voice is provided by an anonymous studio employee, likely composer Carl Stalling, who performed as Mickey in prior shorts.

== Plot ==
The full short.

The animals in the barnyard are watching a series of short song and dance numbers performed by other barnyard animals, similar to the Ziegfeld Follies of the day. It opens with Mickey playing the piano with other animals. A series of other short song and dance numbers presume. The cartoon ends with Mickey giving a solo performance of his theme song "Minnie's Yoo-Hoo".

Along with Mickey, Minnie Mouse is shown in the audience cheering for Mickey. There is also a cast of other barnyard animals, including a group of dancing ducks, a chicken-rooster duo who beat each other up in sync to the music, an operatic singing pig who is poorly received, and various other barnyard animals in the audience.

== Reception ==
In Mickey's Movies: The Theatrical Films of Mickey Mouse, Gijs Grob writes: "Mickey's Follies is Disney's second serious attempt at lip synch, after The Karnival Kid. Mickey sings much more than in the former cartoon, and the all-too-literal mouth movements give him many awkward facial expressions. Later, the animators would learn to tone down the mouth movements, keeping Mickey's face more consistent without losing the illusion of speech."

Motion Picture News (September 14, 1929): "Walt Disney's creation, the popular Mickey Mouse, sings and dances in a typical barnyard frolic, which is the tenth of the series of Mickey films. Strictly speaking, it is not as good as some of its predecessors, but it certainly contains plenty of laughs, nevertheless. One of the weak spots in the film is the injection of a theme song sung by Mickey Mouse; it seems rather flat. Another thing to notice was the cartoon work, which was not executed with the nicety that some of the other cartoons have. However, the laugh material far outburdens the few shortcomings. The animals have a grand time and the fun is shared by the audience. Some of the barnyard folk are sitting on an outhouse, and in their ecstasy over Mickey's performance they crash in the roof. Immediately the door opens and a pig runs out with his pants down. Can you imagine? Movie audiences relish this sort of screen fun, and Mickey's Follies is supplied with enough laughs to make them gurge heartily and long."

== Home media ==
The short was released on December 2, 2002 on Walt Disney Treasures: Mickey Mouse in Black and White.

== See also ==
- Mickey Mouse (film series)
