= Mr. Mouse Takes a Trip =

1940 Mickey Mouse cartoon

- Theatrical release poster
- Directed by: Clyde Geronimi
- Produced by: Walt Disney
- Starring: Elvia Allman; Billy Bletcher; Walt Disney; Lee Millar
- Music by: Leigh Harline; Oliver Wallace
- Animation by: Ed Love; Dick Lundy; Kenneth Muse; Charles Nichols; Chic Otterstrom; Claude Smith; Marvin Woodward
- Layouts by: Jim Carmichael
- Backgrounds by: Ray Huffine; Richard H. Thomas
- Color process: Technicolor
- Production company: Walt Disney Productions
- Distributed by: RKO Radio Pictures
- Release date: November 1, 1940
- Running time: 8 minutes
- Country: United States
- Language: English

Mr. Mouse Takes a Trip is a 1940 American animated short film produced by Walt Disney Productions and released by RKO Radio Pictures. The film was directed by Clyde Geronimi and features original music by Leigh Harline and Oliver Wallace. The film was animated by Clyde Geronimi, Ken Muse, Ed Love, and Marvin Woodward. The voice cast includes Walt Disney as Mickey, Lee Millar as Pluto, and Billy Bletcher as Pete. It was the 109th short in the Mickey Mouse film series to be released, and the third for that year.

The fame of the short has since grown some historical significance, as Walt Disney himself was filmed recording his lines as Mickey Mouse for it, making it one of the only times he was shown doing his voice on camera. Alongside him as voice dubbing is actor Billy Bletcher as the voice of Pete.

The cartoon follows Mickey Mouse and his dog Pluto traveling by train, except they have a rule forbidding dogs from entering the train; Pete plays a menacing conductor intent on enforcing this rule.

== Plot ==
Leaving for vacation, Mickey Mouse and Pluto arrive at a train station in Burbank, California (home of Walt Disney Productions). They board a westbound train to Pomona, but are both immediately kicked off by the conductor Pete, who states that dogs aren't allowed. Pete then rambles off the train's destinations and forces his watch to tell him when the train is ready to leave.

At this point, Mickey decides to smuggle Pluto on board by squeezing him inside the suitcase and they manage to make it aboard the caboose just as the train is leaving the platform. Inside the passenger room, Mickey warns Pluto to be quiet because he will be thrown out if Pete finds out, Mickey manages to pull Pluto out from the suitcase, but as Pete is coming through the train to collect tickets, Mickey is forced to put Pluto back in the suitcase. After biting "OK" in Mickey's tickets, Pete sees Mickey's suitcase containing Pluto in the seat and forcefully throws it into an overhead baggage net. This causes Pluto to bark, making Pete suspicious.

He then recognizes Mickey, who tries to hide behind a large newspaper and make it look like the barking was coming from him. Pete menacingly asks Mickey if he is alone, which Mickey states that he is. Suspecting that Pluto has been stowed in the suitcase, Pete makes up a story about owning a little cat who'd cry when he was all alone and screams a loud "MEOW!" (even making his face closely resemble a real cat) at the suitcase, causing Pluto to leap out barking at the "cat". Realizing that his cover's been blown, Pluto fearfully ducks back into the suitcase, but Pete has already figured it out. Before he can catch the pair, Mickey and Pluto run away and a chase ensues on board the train.

Mickey and Pluto first hide in a sleeping car, where Pete mistakenly intrudes on a female passenger and gets assaulted. Pete then stumbles into another bed where Mickey and Pluto (disguised as babies) are hiding. Pete apologizes for the intrusion, but quickly finds out after covering up Pluto's tail. Just as Mickey and Pluto think that they fooled Pete, Pete bursts in and threatens to beat them to a pulp, but sudden darkness from the train running through a tunnel allows the pair to escape, leaving Pete to beat the mattress to a pulp and experience a brief entanglement with the springs.

Mickey and Pluto masquerade as the conductor by hiding in Pete's own coat and hat they had removed in the tunnel. After getting false directions from Mickey with a deep voice, Pete catches on and attempts to catch them again, but ends up disturbing the female passenger again. Pete receives another beating and, unintentionally taking the passenger's hat, gets pricked by one of her needles. Mickey disguises himself as an Indian chief with Pluto in his papoose, but Pete sees through their disguise after Pluto bites his hand.

While Mickey and Pluto are next to an open window, Pluto is caught on a passing mail hook, which whisks him outside the train. Mickey runs after him through the train, and is just able to grab Pluto as he exits the caboose. An enraged Pete orders the two to stay out as he throws their luggage after them, and they fall to the ground from the mail hook. Mickey then looks up at the station sign and is pleasantly surprised that they have arrived at Pomona. Mickey and Pluto celebrate by shaking hands.

== Voice-over footage ==
Walt Disney (left) and Billy Bletcher recording voice-overs for Mr. Mouse Takes a Trip.

Mr. Mouse Takes a Trip is unique among Disney shorts in that film footage exists of the voice-over session, which included Walt Disney and Billy Bletcher. According to film historian Leonard Maltin, the footage was unknown to exist and only discovered (as of 2004) "not too many years ago".

The black-and-white film, which is about ten minutes in length, is the only known footage of Disney performing as Mickey Mouse. It was included as an extra on the 1997 VHS and 2000 DVD of Fun and Fancy Free, and on the 2004 DVD release "Walt Disney Treasures: Mickey Mouse in Living Color, Volume Two" as an easter egg.

== Reception ==
The Film Daily (Nov 26, 1940): "Funny Cartoon. The irrepressible Mickey Mouse and the equally irrepressible Pluto encounter some amusing difficulties in this short. Mickey sets off with Pluto to pay a visit to Pomona. He is promptly booted off the train because no dogs are allowed, but he circumvents this by cramming Pluto into a suitcase. Mickey and Pluto have lots of conductor trouble before they arrive at their destination, happily being thrown off the train just as it passes through Pomona".

== Adaptations ==
In September 1940, a one-page adaptation of Mr. Mouse Takes a Trip appeared in Good Housekeeping magazine. In this version, Pete discovers Pluto by seeing his tail sticking out of the suitcase. Instead of being kicked off the train, Mickey and Pluto are confined to the baggage car. The story was told in verse and was illustrated by Tom Wood.

In October 1940, a prose version of Mr. Mouse Takes a Trip was printed in the first edition of Walt Disney Comics and Stories. This five-page version is a closer retelling of the film, with the added detail that Mickey is heading to an "important meeting" in Pomona, which he can't be late for. Pluto comes along only because he would get lonely if he stayed home alone.

In 2010, the film inspired the Italian comic story "Topolino, Pluto e la gita in montagna", or "Mickey, Pluto, and the Trip to the Mountain". The story, published in the May edition of Extralarge XL Disney, is 25 pages and written and illustrated by Enrico Faccini.

== Releases ==
- 1940 - original theatrical release
- c. 1980s - "A Disney Vacation" (TV)
- 1986 - "Adventures with Mickey" (TV)
- 1998 - The Ink and Paint Club, episode # 1.43: "On Vacation" (TV)
- 2009 - Have a Laugh! (TV)

== Home media ==
The short was released on May 18, 2004 on Walt Disney Treasures: Mickey Mouse in Living Color, Volume Two: 1939-Today.

Additional releases include:

- c. 1965 - highlights included in "Mickey's Memorable Moments, Volume 2" (Super 8).
- 1984 - "Cartoon Classics - Limited Gold Edition: Mickey" (VHS)
- 1987 - "Memorable Mickey" (VHS)
- 1998 - "The Spirit of Mickey" (VHS)
- 2006 - "Walt Disney's Funny Factory: With Mickey" (DVD)
- 2009 - "Walt Disney Animation Collection: Classic Short Films Volume 1: Mickey and the Beanstalk" (DVD)
- 2010 - "Have a Laugh!: Volume 2" (DVD)
- 2023 - Mickey & Minnie: 10 Classic Shorts - Volume 1 (Blu-ray/DVD/Digital) & Disney+

== See also ==
- Mickey Mouse (film series)
