= How to Swim (2018 film) =

Short film directed by Noa Gusakov

How to Swim איך לשחות
- Directed by: Noa Gusakov
- Screenplay by: Noa Gusakov
- Produced by: Leah Tonic
- Starring: Dina Sanderson; Orli Zilbershatz
- Cinematography: Eitan Hatuka
- Edited by: Noy Barak
- Music by: Ayelet Gabay
- Release date: June 1, 2018 (Tel Aviv Student Film Festival)
- Running time: 15 minutes
- Country: Israel
- Language: Hebrew

How to Swim is a 2018 Israeli short drama film written and directed by Noa Gusakov.

== Plot synopsis ==
In the last few days of her pregnancy, a terrified mother-to-be tricks a stranger into spending time with her.

== Production ==
The film was produced with funding from Gesher Multicultural Film Fund and a grant from the International Student Film Festival, as a winner of the "Short Along the Way" program.

== Cast ==
- Dina Sanderson – Avigail
- Orli Zilbershatz – Tami
- Omry Ashin – Husband
- Gal Macadar
- Irit Digmi

== Reception ==
In his review of the Tel Aviv International Student Film Festival, Ofer Liebergal commended both lead actors for their performances, and said that their respective personalities permeate the film and provide it with its quality. Film critic Yair Raveh called the film one of his favorites of 2018, called it "enchanting, creative and original", and said it was a prime example of exciting things happening in the short-film genre. He also called it "best film of the festival" in his review of the Tel Aviv International Student Film Festival.

== Awards ==
- Best Narrative Short Film – Annapolis Film Festival
- Gold Award – Robinson Short Film Competition, Pittsburgh
- Doron Halperin Award, Best Short Film – Women Directors Film Festival, Israel
- Vimeo Staff Pick

== Festival screenings ==
- Tel Aviv Student Film Festival, Opening Film
- Palm Springs ShortFest
- Encounters Film Festival, UK
- Hamptons International Film Festival
- Shnit Worldwide Film Festival
- IndiEarth Exchange, India
- KFK Short Film Festival, Turkey
- Flickerfest Film Festival, Australia
- Annapolis Film Festival, USA
- Kustendorf Film & Music Festival, Serbia
- Cleveland International Film Festival
- New Jersey Jewish Film Festival
- La.Meko Short Film Festival Germany
- Toronto Jewish Film Festival
- Aspen ShortsFest
- Newport Beach Film Festival
- ONE Country ONE Film International Festival, FRANCE
- Sguardi Altrove Film Festival, Italy 2019
- Robinson Short Film Competition 2019
- Stony Brook Film Festival, New York
- Cinema South Festival, Israel
- IFEMA, International Female Film Festival Malmö 2019
