= Glenn Kinsey =

Glenn Kinsey is a former presenter of Children's ITV, which is the brand name used for the majority of children's television output on ITV in the United Kingdom. He is also a magician. He is now a presentation and communication skills coach in the UK.

== Children's ITV ==
Kinsey first appeared on Children's ITV in July 1991, to present their summer mornings service, which ran from 9:25 am to 12:30 pm each weekday throughout July and August. He also stood in for the Children's ITV afternoons service presenter, Tommy Boyd on several occasions, one of which was the week before Christmas in 1991. There was no Children's ITV summer mornings service from 1992 onwards, so Kinsey didn't return to Children's ITV until late 1992, following Boyd's departure. Kinsey took over presenting in the afternoons from December 1992 to 12 February 1993. He left Children's ITV in February 1993 though, after the new Children's ITV controller, Dawn Airey abolished in-vision continuity in favour of an out-of-vision service, with voice-over links provided by Steven Ryde instead. Kinsey was a big fan of the Children's ITV programme, Knightmare and was the first honorary member of the Knightmare Adventurer's Club.

== Other work ==
Following Children's ITV, Kinsey moved behind-the-scenes to become a full-time presentation and communication skills consultant and coach. He is also a successful author, with 3 books to his name so far. His first book, Tricky Business, was published in 1990, when he was only 19 years old. This book was all about magic and accompanied the BBC TV series of the same name. He has worked on other TV shows for the BBC, ITV & Sky Television too.
