= The Hockey Champ =

1939 Donald Duck cartoon

- Theatrical release poster
- Directed by: Jack King
- Story by: Carl Barks
- Produced by: Walt Disney
- Music by: Paul J. Smith; Charles Wolcott
- Animation by: Paul Allen; Johnny Cannon; Don Towsley; Bernard Wolf
- Color process: Technicolor
- Production company: Walt Disney Productions
- Distributed by: RKO Radio Pictures
- Release date: April 28, 1939; (USA)
- Running time: 7 minutes
- Language: English

The Hockey Champ is a 1939 Donald Duck short film, produced in Technicolor and released by Walt Disney Productions. Story director Carl Barks established a tradition in this cartoon — Donald achieving mastery in some field, only to be undone by his own character flaws — which continued into Barks' comic book stories as well.

== Plot ==
Donald Duck is skating on a frozen body of water (at one point mocking Sonja Henie, an Olympic figure skater and popular movie star at the time), when he spots his three nephews playing ice hockey. After criticizing the boys' skills, Donald shows them a trophy he carries with him, proclaiming him the Hockey Champion of Duck Swamp. Skeptical, the boys accept his challenge to a hockey game. Donald easily scores numerous goals against the boys, which causes him to grow increasingly cocky. When he announces that he will face the nephews blindfolded, the boys turn their efforts from hockey to antagonizing Donald. In the ensuing chase, Donald runs into an ice wall, falls down a frozen well, and has a hockey puck shot into his mouth. The boys ultimately hit him into the hockey net hard enough to transform it into a cage that traps Donald like a bird.

== Cast ==
- Clarence Nash as Donald Duck, Huey, Dewey, and Louie

== Home media ==
The short was released on May 18, 2004, on Walt Disney Treasures: The Chronological Donald, Volume One: 1934-1941. On November 5, 2013, the short was released on Blu-Ray on the 30th anniversary edition of Mickey's Christmas Carol.
