= Chef Donald =

1941 Donald Duck cartoon

- Theatrical release poster
- Directed by: Jack King
- Story by: Carl Barks
- Produced by: Walt Disney
- Starring: Clarence Nash
- Music by: Charles Wolcott
- Color process: Technicolor
- Production company: Walt Disney Productions
- Distributed by: RKO Radio Pictures
- Release date: December 5, 1941
- Running time: 7 minutes
- Country: United States
- Language: English

Chef Donald is a 1941 American Donald Duck short film directed by Jack King and produced by Walt Disney.

== Plot ==
Donald is listening to the radio while using rubber cement to put together a recipe book. He becomes visibly angry when he realizes one of the recipes is for roast duck. A radio cooking program hosted by Old Mother Mallard comes on and gives Donald the idea to mix up a batch of waffles, but he's distracted and accidentally uses the rubber cement instead of baking powder. While Donald sings "Pat-a-Cake, Pat-a-Cake, Baker’s Man", the batter proves to be unusually stiff. First, his spoon gets stuck and the batter acts like a rubber-band airplane, flying the bowl around his house.

Next, Donald falls with his head in the batter, he tries to get out but initially, he can't (with angry quacking and a lot of bubbles popping), and his tail in the waffle iron. Then he tries to chop it with an ax, and the ax flies up and splits the room in half.

Finally, he throws the bowl out the door, it sticks to the knob while the bowl gets stuck between two trees. The stretching causes a branch to knock on the door, tricking Donald into opening it and letting the batter back in. After several attempts, he has had enough and rushes to the radio studio where the cooking program is being broadcast, and takes his anger out on Old Mother Mallard, believing her to be the source of the trouble, still not knowing about the rubber cement accident.

As he approaches the radio station, the radio starts shaking and wobbling showing that Donald is violently attacking Old Mother Mallard as an act of "revenge".

== Cast ==
- Clarence Nash as Donald Duck
- Sarah Selby - Old Mother Mallard

== Home media ==
The short initially made its home media debut on VHS. It was also released on DVD May 18th, 2004, on Walt Disney Treasures: The Chronological Donald, Volume One: 1934-1941. The short has also been made available to stream on Disney+.
