= Early to Bed (1941 film) =

1941 Donald Duck cartoon

- Theatrical release poster
- Directed by: Jack King
- Story by: Carl Barks; Jack Hannah
- Produced by: Walt Disney
- Starring: Clarence Nash
- Music by: Oliver Wallace
- Animation by: Jim Armstrong; Ed Love; Hal King; Ray Patin; Judge Whitaker
- Layouts by: Bill Herwig
- Color process: Technicolor
- Production company: Walt Disney Productions
- Distributed by: RKO Radio Pictures
- Release date: July 11, 1941; (USA)
- Running time: 7:45
- Country: United States
- Language: English

Early to Bed is a Donald Duck animated short film that was released on July 11, 1941, by RKO Radio Pictures. The film was colored by Technicolor, produced by Walt Disney Productions, and directed by Jack King. The cartoon tells the story of Donald, who is trying to sleep, despite the annoyingly loud ticking of the clock keeping him awake.

== Plot ==
The film opens with Donald Duck yawning at the sunset, ready to go to bed, but when he lays down, he hits his head on the bed. He angrily moves down the bed, fluffs his pillow, and lays back down. As soon as his head touches the pillow, it explodes with a burst of feathers. The screen cuts to Donald lying on the bed again with a new pillow. This time, whenever he places his head on the pillow, the clock on his bedside table begins to loudly tick-tock. He puts the clock away into a drawer, but then, the entire drawer begins to vibrate due to the loud sound of the clock. Donald, visibly becoming angry, retrieves the clock from the drawer and throws it against the wall. It lands in a vase, and the entire vase begins to shake with the loud tick-tock of the clock. Finally, Donald throws the clock out the window, where it gets caught in some laundry and bouncing back up, landing into Donald's yawning mouth and causing him to accidentally swallow it. After various attempts to break the clock that is still ticking inside him, Donald manages to spit out the broken clock into small pieces.

Donald goes back to bed, relieved. This time, however, whenever he turns out the lights, his folding bed snaps shut with him inside. Donald struggles to get free, only to be launched into the ceiling by the bed springs. The screen cuts to Donald laying in bed again, this time with the bed affixed to the floor with a variety of boards and ropes. He settles back down to sleep. The broken clock, however, reassembles itself just enough to ring its alarm. Donald sits up fast, and his bed flies apart, launching Donald into the air. He lands back on his bed, now little more than a board with tacks in it, a sheet wrapped around his head like a turban. A sock lands in front of him on a spring, swaying back and forth so that he looks like an angry snake charmer and the short ends with a frustrated Donald Duck.

== Voice cast ==
- Clarence Nash as Donald Duck

== Television ==
- Good Morning, Mickey, episode #55
- Mickey's Mouse Tracks, episode #29
- Donald's Quack Attack, episode #17

== Home media ==
The short was released on May 18, 2004 on Walt Disney Treasures: The Chronological Donald, Volume One: 1934-1941.

Additional releases include:

- Have a Laugh!: Volume 2
- Disney+ (streaming)
