= Charles Wolcott =

Member of the Universal House of justice (1906–1987)

- Born: Charles Frederick Wolcott; September 29, 1906; Flint, Michigan, United States
- Died: January 26, 1987 (aged 80); Haifa, Israel
- Education: University of Michigan
- Occupation: Music composer
- Known for: Member of the Universal House of Justice

Charles Frederick Wolcott (September 29, 1906 in Flint, Michigan – January 26, 1987 in Haifa, Israel) was an American music composer who served as a member of the Universal House of Justice, the supreme governing body of the Bahá'í Faith, between 1963 and 1987.

== Early life ==
Wolcott was born in Flint, Michigan, and attended the University of Michigan, where he formed his own band "Charley Wolcott and His Wolverines" in 1924–1927. Following his graduation, he joined Jean Goldkette's band as a jazz pianist and scored music for such members of that group as Bix Beiderbecke, Joe Venuti, Tommy and Jimmy Dorsey as well as becoming an arranger for Paul Whiteman, Benny Goodman and the Dorsey Brothers. He later joined Johnny Green's band as well, and the two became good friends. Wolcott then went to radio, arranging for Al Jolson, George Burns and Gracie Allen, and Rudy Vallee.

== Hollywood career ==
Wolcott moved to Hollywood sometime between 1935 and 1937 and soon began working at Walt Disney Studios writing music for cartoon shorts, then orchestrating feature films such as Pinocchio, and Bambi. By 1944, he had become General Musical Director at Disney Studios on films such as Saludos Amigos, The Three Caballeros, Make Mine Music, Song of the South and Fun and Fancy Free. Wolcott had a US hit single in 1944 with "Tico-Tico".

In 1950, he transferred to MGM Studios as Associate General Musical Director, and in 1958 became General Musical Director. While at MGM Studios, he was credited with introducing rock-and-roll to the motion picture screen, prevailing on the producer of Blackboard Jungle to incorporate Bill Haley's recording of "Rock Around the Clock" into the 1955 film that Wolcott also scored. He also wrote the love theme from the 1958 adaptation of Cat on a Hot Tin Roof. In 1960, Wolcott hit the US Hot 100 with the song "Ruby Duby Du", which peaked at Number 41.

== Spiritual life ==
Wolcott, who Green called "a man of great spiritual proportions", left Hollywood altogether in 1960 to devote himself full time to the U.S. Baha'i Assembly, which had elected him national secretary. In 1961, he was elected to the faith's International Council and moved to Haifa, where he remained until his death in 1987.

He was buried in Haifa soon after his death, in keeping with Baha'i beliefs.
