= Mickey's Trailer =

1938 Mickey Mouse cartoon

- Super 8 cover
- Directed by: Ben Sharpsteen
- Story by: Jack Kinney
- Produced by: Walt Disney
- Starring: Pinto Colvig; Walt Disney; Clarence Nash
- Music by: Oliver Wallace
- Animation by: Johnny Cannon; Clyde Geronimi; Ed Love; Tom Palmer; Don Patterson; Louie Schmitt; Frenchy de Tremaudan; Cy Young
- Layouts by: Bill Herwig
- Backgrounds by: Bill Herwig
- Color process: Technicolor
- Production company: Walt Disney Productions
- Distributed by: RKO Radio Pictures
- Release date: May 6, 1938
- Running time: 8 minutes
- Country: United States
- Language: English

Mickey's Trailer is a 1938 American animated short film produced by Walt Disney Productions and released by RKO Radio Pictures. The cartoon stars Mickey Mouse, Donald Duck, and Goofy on a near disastrous road trip in a travel trailer. It was directed by Ben Sharpsteen and features the voices of Walt Disney as Mickey, Clarence Nash as Donald, and Pinto Colvig as Goofy. Animators include Ed Love, Louie Schmitt, Johnny Cannon, Don Patterson, Clyde Geronimi, Tom Palmer, Frenchy de Trémaudan, and Cy Young. Pete makes a cameo in this cartoon where he is seen driving a truck during the "Runaway Trailer" sequence featuring Mickey Mouse and Donald Duck. This cartoon was released about five months after Snow White and the Seven Dwarfs. It was the 100th short in the Mickey Mouse film series to be released, and the second for that year.

== Plot ==
The cartoon starts at what seems like a small house in a natural setting. Mickey walks out the door and says, "Oh boy! What a day!" Then, he pulls a lever and walks inside. The house is converted into a trailer (with the natural setting, in the shape of a giant hand fan, revealed to be a city dump) and Goofy's car is released from the side. Then, Goofy starts driving through the countryside while Mickey makes a dinner-like breakfast (corn on the cob, baked potatoes, watermelon, coffee, and milk) and collects water from a passing waterfall with a bucket to use for cooking water. Meanwhile, Donald is sleeping and can't wake up, even when his alarm clock rings and pulls off his blanket. Thanks to a secret control board, Mickey manages to rouse him for a machine-assisted bath, but he sees birds watching him and swats them away with his brush. Later, the bath is converted into a dining area.

When Mickey rings the dinner bell, Goofy foolishly leaves the driver's seat – while the car and trailer are still in motion – for breakfast, in which it drives through a closed road. After several mishaps during the meal (getting hit by nearby drawers and sticking a fork into a power socket), eventually having popcorn for breakfast, Goofy notices that no one is in the driver's seat and accidentally and unknowingly unhitches the trailer in his panic to resume driving and goes on his way. The trailer rolls downhill on an epic runaway adventure, in which the dining table and chairs suddenly fold up into a box. As the trailer is about to go over a cliff, Mickey jumps out from the back of the trailer and pushes on a cliff on the opposite side of the ravine to push the trailer back on the road. The trailer then approaches an oncoming truck driven by Pete (who cameos in this cartoon) and avoids it by driving onto the nearby fence. Donald grabs the phone (connected to an extendable metal arm) and desperately tries to call for help, but finds himself hanging outside the trailer's open door. When the trailer falls off the road again, Mickey grabs a nearby sign to get it back on the road, pulling Donald back inside the trailer in the process. Donald sees an oncoming train and yells at it to stop, to no avail. Mickey watches in panic while Donald begs for his life. Fortunately, the trailer manages to get past the intersection before the train can (at a dangerously close range). The two are relieved that they survived, but suddenly see another oncoming train (it is unclear if the train is the same one from before or a different one), except this time, the train has reached the intersection first. The train clears the intersection at the last second, allowing the trailer to cross through safely. The trailer reaches the end of the road, causing it to roll down the hill like a boulder. Meanwhile, Goofy, who was singing "She'll Be Coming Around the Mountain When She Comes", makes it safely down the hill, but does not see the trailer tumbling down the hill as it miraculously rehitches itself to the car and is a wreck on the inside, but okay on the outside. Unaware of the dramatic events, Goofy says in the end, "Well, I brought you down, safe and sound".

== Voice cast ==
- Mickey Mouse: Walt Disney
- Donald Duck: Clarence Nash
- Goofy: Pinto Colvig

== Home media ==
A Fisher-Price version of the film (and silent) was released for the Movie Viewer in 1974.

The short was released on December 4, 2001, on Walt Disney Treasures: Mickey Mouse in Living Color and on Walt Disney's Classic Cartoon Favorites Extreme Adventure Fun Volume 7, and the 1998 The Spirit of Mickey Mouse VHS. It was re-released on Blu-ray/DVD/Digital on the 2018 Celebrating Mickey compilation.

== Legacy ==
This cartoon was later adapted into a Mickey Mouse comic strip story titled The Unhappy Campers in which they replaced Donald with Morty and Ferdie Fieldmouse and Pluto. This was because Donald was not a character in the Mickey Mouse strip at the time.

A cut down version of the film is also part of the Christmas show From All of Us to All of You.

The film was also incorporated into the 1983 film The Outsiders.

Some gags from the "Runaway Trailer" sequence were reused for the "Runaway Car" segment of the 1995 film A Goofy Movie.

== See also ==
- Mickey Mouse (film series)
