= Donald's Quack Attack =

Television series

- Country of origin: United States
- Original language: English

Production
- Running time: 22 minutes
- Production company: Walt Disney Productions

Original release
- Network: The Disney Channel
- Release: November 2, 1992 – 2003

Related
- Donald Duck Presents; Mickey's Mouse Tracks

Donald's Quack Attack is an American animated television series which ran on The Disney Channel and was later rerun on Toon Disney. It premiered on November 2, 1992, along with Mickey's Mouse Tracks, on The Disney Channel.

== Content ==
The series featured Disney animated short films, especially those with Mickey Mouse, Donald Duck, and Goofy. Each episode lasted about 22–28 minutes, leaving some time for commercials.

A similar Mickey Mouse version was called Mickey's Mouse Tracks, but unlike Mouse Tracks, Quack Attack was run with a manic energy. In between the cartoon shorts, a screen would appear with a random background color (pink, blue, green, etc.) with a clip in the corner from a random Donald Duck cartoon. There was a thermometer called the "Quack Attack Meter" with Donald's head on the bottom. When the clip showed Donald getting angry, injured, or humiliated, the head on the thermometer would go up and make a dinging sound. This 10-25 second clip would appear 2 to 4 times per show, depending on how long the shorts were. The credits for the show did not name anyone. Instead, it stated, "The cartoons in this program are the work of animators from THE WALT DISNEY COMPANY over the past 60 years".

When the show premiered in 1992, it was meant to replace Donald Duck Presents. It was not possible to know what episode was going to be shown on any given day, but the show did feature showings of some shorts that do not show up on The Ink and Paint Club along with some shorts made by the Fleischer Studios, and clips from the animated features, such as Snow White and the Seven Dwarfs, Pinocchio, Peter Pan, and Lady and the Tramp.

== Airing ==
Donald's Quack Attack aired on The Disney Channel from 1992 to 1998, and on Toon Disney from 1998 to 2003. From April 2001 to early 2003, Quack Attack usually aired weekdays at 5 a.m., and every night at midnight. When Quack Attack aired on Toon Disney, there were short commercial breaks in between each cartoon, unlike the airings on The Disney Channel. On some episodes, the first cartoon was cut from the episode to make room for commercial breaks.

== Broadcast history ==
=== United States ===
- Disney Channel (November 2, 1992 – 2000)
- Toon Disney (April 18, 1998 – December 2002)

=== Canada ===
- Family (1994–1997)

=== United Kingdom ===
- Disney Channel (1995–2000)
- Toon Disney (2000–2003)

=== France ===
- Disney Channel (1997–2002)
- Toon Disney (2001–2003)

=== Italy ===
- Rai Due (1993–present)
- Disney Channel (1998–2000)
- Toon Disney (2004–2011)

=== Indonesia ===
- MNCTV (2010-2011)
- RCTI (2012–2014; re-run 2016–present)

=== Russia ===
- Channel One (2005–2010)
- Disney Channel (2012–2013)
