= Mickey's Mouse Tracks =

Television series

- Opening theme: Mickey's Mouse Tracks Theme
- Country of origin: United States
- Original language: English

Production
- Running time: 22 minutes
- Production company: Walt Disney Productions

Original release
- Network: Disney Channel
- Release: November 2, 1992 – 1995

Related
- Good Morning, Mickey!; Disney's Mickey Mouse Works; Donald's Quack Attack; Mickey Mouse and Friends

Mickey's Mouse Tracks is an American animated television series on the Disney Channel which ran from 1992 to 1995, and featured Disney cartoons and animated short films, dating from before the advent of The Disney Channel. A similar show was Donald's Quack Attack. The show premiered on November 2, 1992, along with Donald's Quack Attack, on The Disney Channel. The show was made to replace Good Morning, Mickey! A similar show called Mickey Mouse and Friends was produced between 1994 and 1995 and shown in Europe.

== Content ==
It was not possible to know what episode was going to be shown on any given day, but the show did feature some shorts that were not shown on The Ink and Paint Club along with some shorts made by the Fleischer Studios, and clips from Disney animated features such as Snow White and the Seven Dwarfs, Pinocchio, Dumbo, Cinderella, and Alice in Wonderland.

In between each cartoon, a short segment featured a small clip of a Mickey Mouse cartoon, accompanied by the Mouse Tracks logo. In 1999, the show was succeeded by Mickey Mouse Works, later given a plot as House of Mouse. In addition to airing on The Disney Channel from 1992 to 2000, the show also ran on Toon Disney from 1998 to 1999.

== Broadcast history ==
=== United States ===
- Disney Channel (November 2, 1992 – 2000)
- Toon Disney (1998–1999)

=== Canada ===
- Family (1994–1997)

=== United Kingdom ===
- Disney Channel (1995–2000)
- Toon Disney (2000–2003)

=== France ===
- Disney Channel (1997–2002)
- Toon Disney (2001–2003)

=== Italy ===
- Rai Due (1993–present)
- Disney Channel (1998–2000)
- Toon Disney (2004–2011)

=== Russia ===
- Channel One (2006)
- Disney Channel (2013)
