= Hazel Sewell =

American animator (1898–1975)

- Born: Hazel Bounds; May 1, 1898; Spalding, Idaho, U.S.
- Died: January 22, 1975 (aged 76); Los Angeles, California, U.S.

Hazel Mae Sewell (née Bounds; 1 May 1898 – 22 January 1975), later Cottrell, was an American animation artist and the first head of Walt Disney Studio's Ink and Paint Department. (It was earlier known as the Tracing & Opaquing Department.)

Born in Spalding, Idaho, she was hired shortly after her sister Lillian Bounds, also known as Lillian Disney, began working at the studio as an artist. Some of Sewell's primary responsibilities as the head of the Ink and Paint Department included: developing new techniques in the inking and painting processes, creating new divisions at the Walt Disney Studio, and overseeing the hiring and training of new artists. Sewell worked with the studio for 11 years until resigning in May 1938. She was the first woman to serve as the head of a major division at Disney Studios. She is known for her work on Disney animated shorts such as Plane Crazy and the feature film Snow White and the Seven Dwarfs.

== Biography ==
Sewell was born Hazel Bounds on May 1, 1898, and she was one of ten children. She grew up on the Nez Perce Native American Reservation in Lapwai, Idaho, and though poor, her family was described as "happy." Before working for Walt Disney as a young adult, she married her husband Glenn O. Sewell, and they continued to reside in Lapwai. (Glenn Sewell was the brother of Blanche Sewell, a film editor in classic Hollywood.) After her husband found work in Los Angeles, the couple moved there with their only daughter Marjorie Sewell.

After moving to Los Angeles, Sewell's sister Lillian Bounds moved in with Sewell and her husband. Bounds began working at the Walt Disney Studio as an artist after being referred by Sewell's friend, Kathleen Dollard. While working at the studio, Bounds started a relationship with Disney, whom she eventually married. After her sister's marriage, Sewell spent more time with Disney which led to her recruitment at the studio.

In the late 1920s, Sewell divorced her husband. Shortly after, she and her daughter moved in with her sister and brother-in-law. Several years after her divorce, Sewell began dating William H.D. Cottrell, who had started working for the Walt Disney Studio as a cameraman in 1929. The couple got married in 1938 and Sewell left the Walt Disney Studio around the same time. Cottrell continued to work at the studio after Sewell's departure. The two remained married until Sewell's death in 1975.

== Career ==
The Walt Disney Studio had been recruited by Universal Studios to create short cartoons revolving around a character Disney had created, Oswald the Lucky Rabbit. Shortly after this deal had been made in 1927, Disney recruited Sewell as the head of the Ink and Paint Department. This made Sewell the first woman in the animation industry to serve as the head of a major division. (At the time, the inkers were known as "the Blackeners" due to the lack of colors, which could not be used in the film process until 1932.) In 1928, Charles Mintz took the rights to the Oswald character along with several people who had been working at the Walt Disney Studio at the time. Sewell was one of the few employees who stayed after the loss of Oswald.

After losing Oswald, Disney created the idea for a cartoon character known as Mickey Mouse. The first Mickey Mouse cartoon was created by a small group of Disney employees. Sewell, Bounds, and Edna Disney were responsible for inking and painting the cels used for the first Mickey Mouse cartoon ever created. The cartoon was titled Plane Crazy and it was released in 1928. While Plane Crazy struggled to achieve success, the creation of Mickey Mouse led to the release of more cartoons, such as Steamboat Willie, that performed successfully.

The Walt Disney Studio began to grow after the creation of Mickey Mouse. In the Ink and Paint Department, Sewell led the animation industry's first team entirely composed of women. For example, Sewell and her team inked and painted cels for Mickey Mouse cartoons and for the Silly Symphonies short films in 1932. As the head of the Ink and Paint Department, Sewell was responsible for establishing new techniques used in the process of creating animations. These techniques were often used to target problems that would arise while creating cels for Disney's animations such as finding ways to get paint to dry faster as production demand increased. Within her department, she established two separate divisions for inking and painting to better define each discipline. Sewell was also responsible for overseeing the hiring and training of new artists in the department. She and her team established a list of criteria that assessed the painting, accuracy, cleanliness, ability to follow instructions, organization, and productivity of potential hires. Additionally, Sewell established training classes for artists at the studio to refine their inking and painting skills as the demand for animations grew.

Sewell's responsibilities continued to grow as the Walt Disney Studio began to work on colour animation. Sewell's frequent experimentation with cels allowed her to work with manufactured materials to create colour animations. With the creation of colour animation, Disney decided to create a full-length animated motion picture, leading to the beginning of the production process for Snow White and the Seven Dwarfs. During the process, Sewell set up new departments responsible for cel cutting, cel washing, and paper punching. Sewell was also put in charge of securing materials for Snow White and the Seven Dwarfs. The movie's high demand for high-grade celluloid sheets led to constant correspondence between Sewell and the studio's celluloid manufacturers. The final product of Snow White and the Seven Dwarfs used 362,000 cels.

Shortly after the release of Snow White and the Seven Dwarfs, Sewell resigned from the Walt Disney Studio in May 1938 after 11 years with the company. While working for Disney, Sewell suffered a nervous breakdown and went on leave. During this time, she was not provided pay. According to a letter Sewell wrote to Disney, her frustration and the lack of appreciation she felt led to her departure from the company.

Despite her resignation, Sewell remained involved with the studio because of her familial relationships with the Disneys and her husband's employment at the studio. In 1941, Sewell accompanied the Disneys, Cottrell, and several other notable Disney artists, who referred to themselves as El Grupo, on a trip to South America. The trip had been ordered by the US government to improve the relationship between the United States and South American countries during the Second World War. The trip was a goodwill tour as Disney's presence incited excitement from South American Disney fans. In addition, the group used the tour as inspiration for animations they hoped to produce featuring South American culture. The tour inspired the famous Saludos Amigos and Three Caballeros cartoons.

She died in Los Angeles in 1975.

== Filmography ==
Year	Title	Notes
1928	Plane Crazy	Ink Artist
1930	Fiddling Around	Ink Artist
1930	Sinkin' in the Bathtub	Trace and Paint
1934	Servants' Entrance	Ink and Paint Artist
1937	Porky the Wrestler	Ink Artist
1937	Picador Porky	Ink Artist
1937	Porky's Railroad	Ink Artist
1937	Snow White and the Seven Dwarfs	Art Director
1942	Bambi	Animator

== See also ==
- Retta Scott
- Helen Ogger
