= Helen Ogger =

American inker and cartoonist (1909–1983)

Helen Ogger (June 20, 1909 – February 1983) was an American inker and cartoonist who worked for Walt Disney Productions' Ink and Paint Department throughout the 1930s. She is known for her work on Snow White and the Seven Dwarfs, as she was the only one who could apply the dye that became Snow White's blush.

== Early life and education ==
Helen Ogger was born on June 20, 1909, to Fred Ogger and Anna Strohauer, both children of German immigrants. She grew up in Caro, Michigan, and when she was fourteen, the family moved to Glendale, California. Ogger then attended Glendale Union High School and graduated in 1927, before studying at USC for two years. After that she attended Frank Wiggins Trade School (later Los Angeles Trade-Technical College), having majored in Advertising Illustration, and having studied alongside her friend, Juanita Fernandez. (Fernandez would go on to work as an inker like Ogger.) Ogger completed her education in June 1931, the same year she started working for Walt Disney Productions.

== Career at Disney ==
Within her first year, Ogger worked on Mickey Mouse cartoons and the Silly Symphonies short films as part of the Ink & Paint department. She worked under Hazel Sewell who led an all-woman team. Ogger brought her skills in cartooning and animation to Snow White in the mid-1930s. (At some unspecified point beforehand, she had been a cartoonist and drew cartoon strips, possibly for a newspaper.)

According to legend, the inkers used rouge to color Snow White's cheek during the cel-painting process.

The inkers experimented with make-up for the blush effect, but in actuality, materials like rouge and lipstick failed. Eventually they tried a red dye, applying it with a cotton-wrapped pencil akin to a cotton swab.

Ogger was the only inker who could apply the dye properly, likely due to her unique combination of skills, and she used this process for the entire film.

This effect would be used again in Pinocchio and Fantasia, though not as extensively.

The effect was arduous and complicated:

[Ogger] had to place several cells together on an animation board, one atop the other, just like in the process of animation, in order to get the 'registration' right (the spot of red just right in relation to the preceding and following ones) - all of this without any guide. She would work out her own extremes and then 'animate' the blush in inbetweens.

Eventually her abilities were recognized by the studio, as she rose to become the head of Inking and Special effects. She even taught classes on animation at the studio. Ogger left the studio in 1941, supposedly as part of the strike at the time. Afterwards, she worked for Lockheed Aircraft.

== Death ==
Ogger died in February 1983, and she was buried in Forest Lawn Memorial Park (Glendale) alongside her parents. She was seventy-three.

== See also ==
- Retta Scott
