= The Mickey Mouse Theater of the Air =

The Mickey Mouse Theater of the Air was a 1938 musical-variety radio series for children, sponsored by Pepsodent and heard on NBC on Sunday afternoons, featuring Mickey Mouse and other characters from Walt Disney cartoons. There were a total of twenty broadcasts from the Disney Little Theater on the RKO lot from January 2 to May 15, 1938, the program was created to promote the February 1938 release of Disney's first animated feature film, Snow White and the Seven Dwarfs. In addition to Snow White featured in the second episode, the series featured other fairy tale and nursery rhyme characters, including "Mother Goose Land," "Cinderella," "King Neptune," "The Pied Piper," "The Old Woman in the Shoe" and "Old MacDonald".

The show was originally contracted with Pepsodent for thirteen weeks, but it was successful enough to be extended to a total of twenty episodes.

== Production ==
Broadcasters had pursued a Mickey Mouse radio program for several years, but Disney rejected the idea, feeling that the cartoon characters' main appeal was visual, and that the voices might not be enough to carry a radio series. However, the opportunity to promote the Snow White film was too important to miss. The first proposed version was a talk show, with Mickey interviewing guest stars, but that idea was scrapped in September 1937. The writers focused instead on the Disney characters' affinity with folk tales and nursery rhymes.

Disney performed Mickey's voice for the first three episodes. Starting with the fourth episode, Mickey was voiced by comedian Joe Twerp. Disney also appeared as himself in some early episodes. In later episodes, Disney was too busy to attend performances, and he was impersonated by announcer John Hiestand.

Other Disney characters featured on the program were Donald Duck (Clarence Nash), Minnie Mouse (Thelma Boardman), Goofy (Stuart Buchanan) and Clara Cluck (Florence Gill).

Music was provided by the Felix Mills Orchestra, Donald Duck's Swing Band and The Minnie Mouse Woodland Choir. The opening theme music was "Who's Afraid of the Big Bad Wolf?", and the closing theme was "Heigh-Ho" from Snow White and the Seven Dwarfs.

== Episodes ==
1. Robin Hood (January 2, 1938)
2. Snow White Day (January 9, 1938)
3. Donald Duck's Band (January 16, 1938)
4. The River Boat (January 23, 1938)
5. Ali Baba (January 30, 1938)
6. South of the Border show episodes(February 6, 1938)
7. Mother Goose and Old King Cole (February 13, 1938)
8. The Gypsy Band (February 20, 1938)
9. Cinderella (February 27, 1938)
10. King Neptune (March 6, 1938)
11. The Pied Piper (March 13, 1938)
12. Sleeping Beauty (March 20, 1938)
13. Ancient Egypt (March 27, 1938) (guest appearance by Snow White)
14. Mother Goose and The Old Woman in a Shoe (April 3, 1938)
15. Long John Silver (April 10, 1938)
16. King Arthur (April 17, 1938)
17. Who Killed Cock Robin? (April 24, 1938)
18. Cowboy Show (May 1, 1938)
19. William Tell (May 8, 1938)
20. Old MacDonald (May 15, 1938)

== Trivia ==
- Sing a Song of Sixpence is sung by Stuart Buchanan.

== Listen to ==
- The Mickey Mouse Theater of the Air in the Internet Archive's Old-Time Radio Collection
