= Donald's Decision =

1942 Donald Duck cartoon

- Title frame
- Directed by: Ford Beebe
- Produced by: Walt Disney
- Starring: Clarence Nash; John Dehner; Don Brodie
- Music by: Oliver Wallace (composer); Frank Churchill (reused music from The Practical Pig); Paul J. Smith (reused music from The Practical Pig)
- Animation by: Jack King; Ed Love; Al Bertino; Retta Scott
- Color process: Technicolor
- Production company: Walt Disney Studios
- Distributed by: National Film Board of Canada; Government of Canada
- Release date: January 11, 1942
- Running time: 3:35
- Countries: Canada; United States
- Language: English

Donald's Decision is a four-minute educational short animated film made by the Walt Disney Studios, for the National Film Board of Canada. The film was released theatrically on January 11, 1942 as part of a series of four films directed at the Canadian public to buy war bonds during the Second World War.

Donald's Decision was directed by Ford Beebe, and featured the voice talent of Clarence "Ducky" Nash as "Donald Duck" and Thelma Boardman as the "Angel" (1942) as Donald wrestles with his conscience, to do the right thing. (Note: Although a character voiced by a female, the angelic side of Donald is referred to as a "he".) Although in production prior to the attack on Pearl Harbor, the film is an example of a World War II propaganda film.

Donald's Decision re-uses animation from the Disney cartoon short Donald's Better Self (1938) and Self Control (1938), that also featured Donald's struggles between an angelic and demonic version of himself.

== Plot ==
In 1942, as Donald is relaxing in a hammock, a radio program encourages purchasing war savings certificates but he merely yawns and says "Tomorrow". His guardian angel immediately propels Donald out of his complacency and urges him to get his piggy bank out to buy war savings certificates that will ensure the Allied Powers's victory.

On hearing this plea, Donald's other side, a demonic version lurking in a mailbox, that features a swastika created by the spinning mail semaphore, challenges his angel, telling Donald to "have a good time and spend his money on himself." When the angelic side argues that "everyone must do his share", the devil "blitzes" the angel and boots Donald's good side into the nearby lake. Furious, Donald's angel storms into the sky and dive-bombs the evil devil, sending him to an early grave like in the original Donald's Better Self.

Steering Donald on his rightful path to the post office, the angelic side makes Donald buy his war savings certificates. Immediately, a series of posters and war messages reinforce the message to "Invest in Victory".

== Voice cast ==
- Clarence Nash as Donald Duck
- John Dehner as Radio Announcer
- Don Brodie as Donald's Devil
- Thelma Boardman as Donald's Angel

== Production ==
In 1939, with the outbreak of a global war, Walt Disney Studios felt a great pinch in their finances due to the loss of much of their European markets. This was further limited with the invasion of France by Nazi forces in 1940, which meant that the next Disney release Pinocchio (1940) was only dubbed in Spanish and Portuguese, a great deal less languages than previous Disney works.

Due to this loss of profit, and losses on recent films, Disney studios faced a bleak outlook of a deficit of over half a million dollars, layoffs and pay cuts for the first time in the studio, and a $2.23 million ceiling on their credit allowance. With bleak prospects, the studio was made into a corporation in April 1940, which raised $3.6 million to help pay off debts owed by the studio. To enable his studios to keep afloat and producing films, Walt Disney sought out external funding to cover production costs, which would allow him to keep employees on the payroll and keep the studio working.

On March 3, 1941, Disney invited over three dozen different representatives of various national defence industries to a lunch meeting, in an attempt to solicit work from them. He followed this luncheon with formal letters offering work "for national defence industries at cost, and without profit. In making this offer, I am motivated solely by a desire to help as best I can in the present emergency." Four Methods of Flush Riveting (1941) was first training film that was commissioned by Lockheed Aircraft. (Note: Disney Studios would eventually make 200 wartime training films, predominantly for the United States military.)

In response to Disney's efforts, John Grierson, the head of the National Film Board of Canada entered into a co-production agreement for four animated films to promote the Canadian War Savings Plan. The films, in order of production were: The Thrifty Pig (1941), 7 Wise Dwarfs (1941), Donald's Decision (1942) and All Together (1942). In addition, a training film for the Canadian Army, that eventually became Stop That Tank! (1942) was commissioned.

== Reception ==
While intended for a theatrical audience, Donald's Decision along with the other three films in the series, was effective in delivering its message to Canadians through their local War Savings Committee. When America entered the war, these shorts were later released as part of the eight bond drives in the United States.

== Home media ==
The short was released on May 18, 2004 on Walt Disney Treasures: Walt Disney on the Front Lines.

== See also ==
- List of films about angels
- List of World War II short films
- Walt Disney's World War II propaganda production
