= Lisa Gerritsen =

American actress (born 1957)

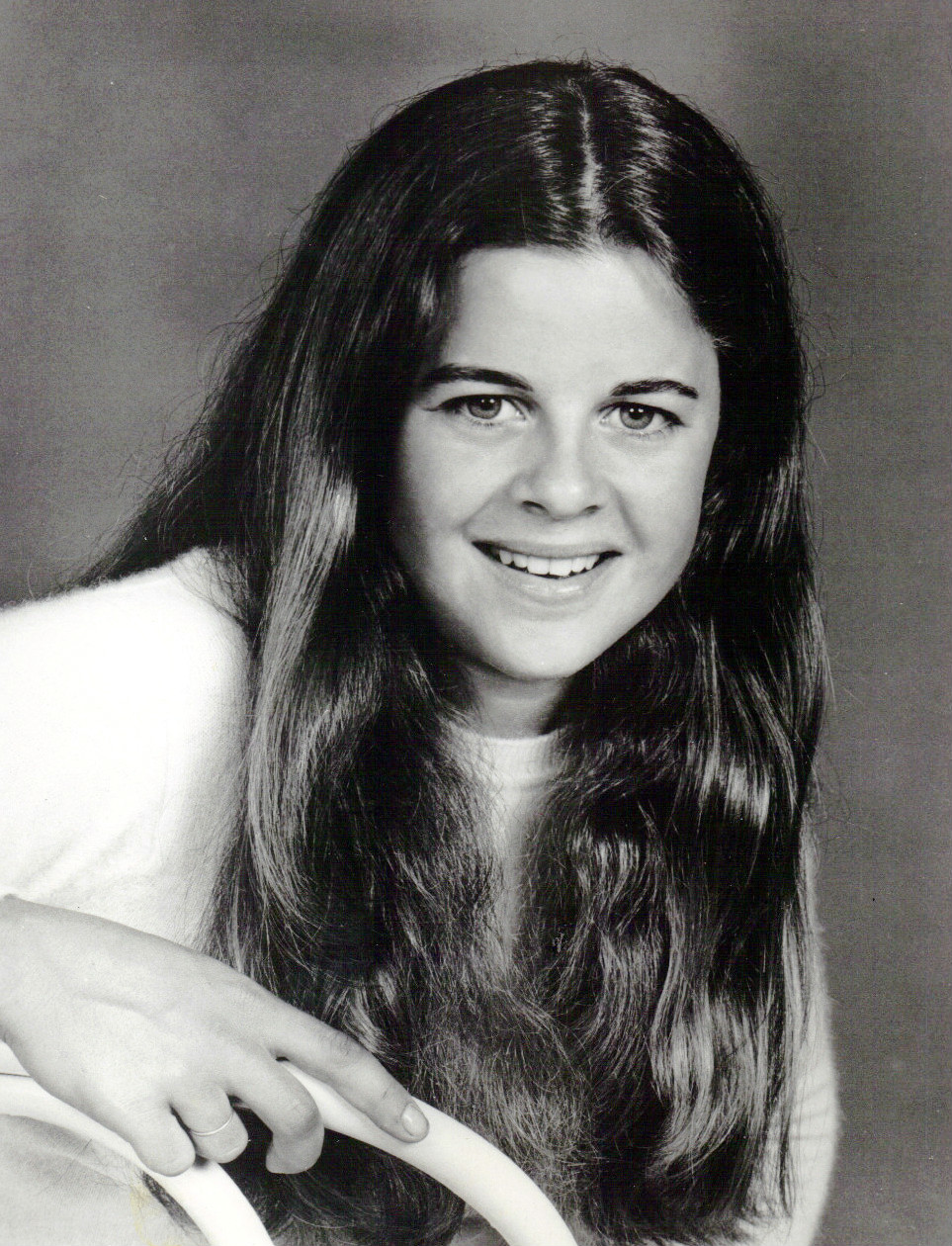
- Gerritsen in 1975
- Born: Lisa Orszag; December 21, 1957 (age 68); Los Angeles, California, U.S.
- Occupation: Actress
- Years active: 1968–1978
- Spouse: John Rustan (m. 2000)
- Children: 1
- Relatives: True Eames Boardman (grandfather); Thelma Boardman (grandmother); True Boardman (great-grandfather); Virginia True Boardman (great-grandmother)

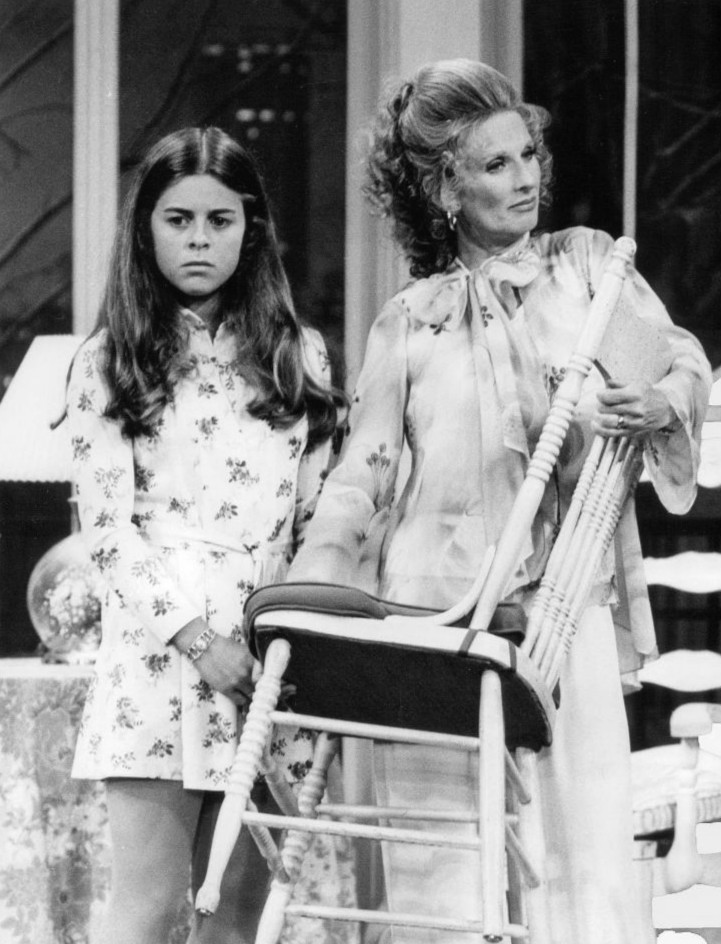
Gerritsen as Bess Lindstrom with her mother Phyllis Lindstrom (Cloris Leachman), 1974

Lisa Gerritsen (born Lisa Orszag; December 21, 1957) is an American former child actress. She is most noted for her role as Bess, the independent-minded daughter of Phyllis Lindstrom on the 1970s television series The Mary Tyler Moore Show and its spin-off Phyllis.

== Early life ==
Lisa Gerritsen was born Lisa Orszag in Los Angeles and is the granddaughter of child actor and screenwriter True Eames Boardman, and the great-granddaughter of silent film actors True Boardman and Virginia True Boardman. Her acting career began when she was eleven years old. Encouraged by her mother and grandfather, she landed her first professional role in an episode of The Doris Day Show in 1968.

== Career ==
After The Mary Tyler Moore Show, Gerritsen had guest-star or cameo appearances in several television shows, including The Odd Couple, Bonanza, The Courtship of Eddie's Father, The Virginian, and Family Affair.

Gerritsen appeared in several episodes of Gunsmoke, which helped to land her first regular role as Lydia Monroe, the precocious daughter of William Windom's character, John Monroe, a Thurber-like writer and cartoonist, in the 1969 NBC comedy series My World and Welcome to It. Also starring Joan Hotchkis as Ellen, Lydia's mother, the somewhat dark situation comedy was based on the cartoons and comedy of author James Thurber, combining live-action storylines of family strife and social satire with animated cartoon characters that broke into the frame during segments featuring Monroe's daydreams and fantasies. Despite having won two Emmy awards, the show was cancelled after only one season.

In 1970, Gerritsen (credited as Lisa True Gerritsen) appeared as Hannah Carson on the TV western The Men From Shiloh (the rebranded name for The Virginian) in the episode "Hannah". Also that year, Gerritsen was cast as Bess Lindstrom, the quick-witted daughter of landlord Phyllis Lindstrom (Cloris Leachman), a mother who believed in progressive parenting, on The Mary Tyler Moore Show. Bess was a recurring character throughout the length of the series and Gerritsen continued playing the role in the spinoff, Phyllis.

In addition to television, Gerritsen performed in several movies. She made her first big-screen appearance in Airport, playing the role of Libby Bakersfeld. She also appeared as Linda in The War Between Men and Women, starring Jack Lemmon and Barbara Harris.

She left acting at the age of 20, shortly after the show Phyllis was cancelled.

== Filmography ==
=== Film ===
Year	Title	Notes	Role
1970	Airport		Libby Bakersfeld
1971	A Howling in the Woods	TV movie	Betsy Warren
1972	The War Between Men and Women		Linda Kozlenko
1974	Locusts	TV movie	Sissy Fletcher
1974	Mixed Company		Liz Morrison

=== Television ===
Year	Title	Role	Notes
1968	The Good Guys	Louella	Episode: "Nostradamus Rides Again"
1968–70	Gunsmoke	Nettie; Tracey Copperton; Christina Bascomb; Jenny Pritchard	Episode: "The Miracle Man"; Episode: "The Twisted Heritage"; Episode: "Sam McTavish, M.D."; Episode: "Jenny"
1968–71	The Doris Day Show	Jackie Clements; Sue Ann Cordovan	Episode: "The Friend"; Episode: "The Black Eye"; Episode: "Billy's First Date"
1969–70	My World and Welcome to It	Lydia Monroe	Main cast (26 episodes)
1969	Gomer Pyle: USMC	Girl Scout	Episode: "Gomer Maneuvers"
1969–70	Family Affair	May; Kathy; Geraldine Askins	Episode: "A Diller, A Dollar"; Episode: "The Young Man from Bolivia"; Episode: "Stamp of Approval"
1969	Lancer	Vinny Buttermere	Episode: "The Great Hamburg"
1969	The Courtship of Eddie's Father	Alice	Episode: "The Library Card"
1970	Insight	Anita	Episode: "Old King Cole"
1970–75	The Mary Tyler Moore Show	Bess Lindstrom	Recurring cast (10 episodes)
1970	The Men from Shiloh	Hannah Carson	Episode: "Hannah"
1971	The Odd Couple	Bunny	Episode: "Bunny Is Missing Down by the Lake"
1971	Bonanza	Cassie O'Casey	Episode: "Cassie"
1972	The Amazing Chan and the Chan Clan	Various Characters	Voice only (14 episodes)
1973	The Wonderful World of Disney	Jenny Hutchins	Episode: "The Boy and the Bronc Buster: Part 1"; Episode: "The Boy and the Bronc Buster: Part 2"
1973	Ironside	Nancy Flynn	Episode: "Double-Edged Corner"
1974	Harry O	Michelle March	Episode: "Ballinger's Choice"
1975–77	Phyllis	Bess Lindstrom	Main cast (24 episodes)
1976	Jigsaw John	The Runaway	Episode: "Runaway"
1978	Insight	Lisa Sears	Episode: "It Can't Happen to Me"
