= K – The Unknown =

1924 silent film

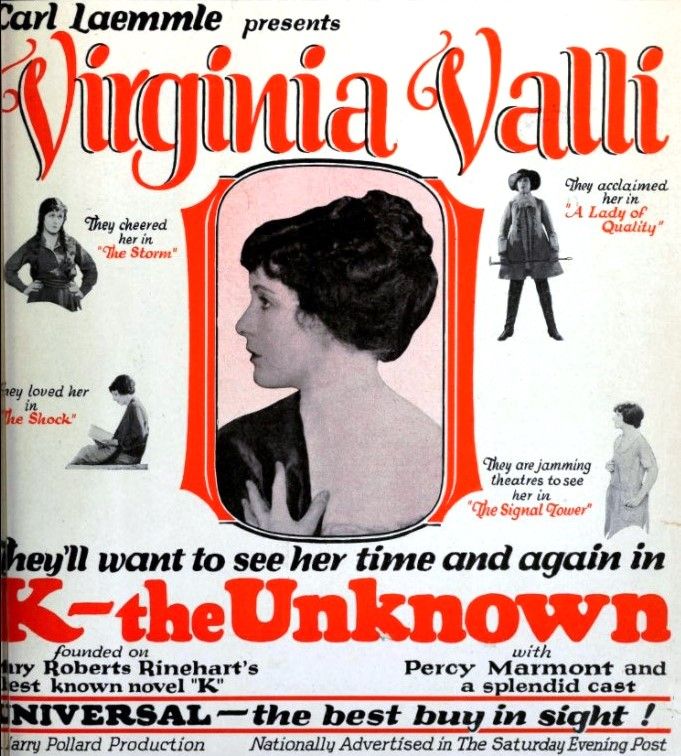
- Directed by: Harry A. Pollard
- Written by: Louis D. Lighton; Hope Loring; Raymond L. Schrock
- Based on: K. by Mary Roberts Rinehart
- Produced by: Carl Laemmle
- Starring: Virginia Valli; Percy Marmont; Margarita Fischer
- Cinematography: Charles J. Stumar
- Production company: Universal Pictures
- Distributed by: Universal Pictures
- Release date: November 17, 1924
- Running time: 90 minutes
- Country: United States
- Language: Silent (English intertitles)

K – The Unknown is a 1924 American silent mystery film directed by Harry A. Pollard and starring Virginia Valli, Percy Marmont, and Margarita Fischer. It is based on the 1915 novel K. by Mary Roberts Rinehart.

== Plot ==
As described in a film magazine, Sidney Page, glorious in the beauty and charm of young womanhood, awoke one day to the dazzling realization that she was the object of the affection of two mature men. Masculine affection was nothing new to her: from her schooldays she had been courted by two youths of her own age, and she had been considered the belle of the small city where she lived. "K" Le Moyne. quiet, distinguished, mysterious, his presence in the city a mystery, intrigued her. Dr. Max Wilson, recently come to assume direction of the new hospital, swept her off her balance by the swiftness of his wooing. Herself studying to be a nurse, she came in close contact with him, even as she had with Le Moyne, who was a boarder in the home of the aunt with whom she lived. It was her interest in Le Moyne that was responsible for her breaking off sentimental association with two youths of her school days, George "Slim" Benson and Joe Drummond. Slim did not take his conge much to heart, although he and Joe had engaged in fierce quarrels concerning their position in the regards of Sidney. However, Joe was deeply affected; in time he was to do an act of desperation that had vital consequence in the lives of Sidney, Le Moyne, Dr. Wilson, and Carlotta Harrison, who had come with Dr. Wilson to the hospital as his special nurse. The complications that came into the lives of these men and women brought tragedy in their wake, but they also brought happiness to two and the sad penalty of mourning over cold ashes of vengeance for another.

== Cast ==
- Virginia Valli as Sidney Page
- Percy Marmont as 'K' Le Moyne
- Margarita Fischer as Charlotte Harrison
- Donald Keith as George 'Slim' Benson
- John Roche as Dr. Max Wilson
- Maurice Ryan as Joe Drummond
- Myrtle Vane as Aunt Harriett Kennedy
- William A. Carroll as Dr. Ed Wilson

== Preservation ==
A complete print of K – The Unknown is held in the collection of the UCLA Film & Television Archive that originally was at EYE Film Institute Netherlands.

== Bibliography ==
- Theresa St. Romain. Margarita Fischer: A Biography of the Silent Film Star. McFarland, 2008.
