= The War Between Men and Women =

1972 film by Melville Shavelson

- Theatrical release poster
- Directed by: Melville Shavelson
- Written by: Danny Arnold; Melville Shavelson; James Thurber (writings)
- Produced by: Danny Arnold
- Starring: Jack Lemmon; Barbara Harris; Jason Robards
- Cinematography: Charles F. Wheeler
- Edited by: Frank Bracht
- Music by: Marvin Hamlisch
- Production companies: Jalem Productions; Llenroc Productions; Four D Productions; Cinema Center Films
- Distributed by: National General Pictures
- Release date: June 2, 1972
- Running time: 110 minutes
- Country: United States
- Language: English
- Box office: $4,000,000 (US/Canada rentals)

The War Between Men and Women is a 1972 American comedy-drama film directed by Melville Shavelson and starring Jack Lemmon, Barbara Harris, and Jason Robards. The film is based on the writings of humorist James Thurber, was co-produced by Lemmon's Jalem Productions, Shavelson's Llenroc Productions, Danny Arnold's Four D Productions, and Cinema Center Films, with distribution via National General Pictures.

It features animated cartoons interspersed in the story based on Thurber's works. Shavelson was creator of the 1969 Thurber-based television series My World and Welcome to It. The screenplay is by Shavelson and by Danny Arnold, who also worked on the 1969 series. Lisa Gerritsen, who plays Linda Kozlenko in the film, previously co-starred in My World and Welcome to It as Lydia Monroe.

== Plot ==
Peter Wilson is a sarcastic near-sighted cartoonist, author, and swinging bachelor living in Manhattan. He detests women, dogs, and children. He is flustered by women's priorities and avoids commitment, much preferring transient physical relationships. At the office of his eye surgeon, Peter meets a leggy, eye-catching strong-willed woman named Terri Kozlenko. He likes her very much, but discovers later that she is a divorced mother to three children, Caroline, Linda, and David. The first thing she learns about him, from his ophthalmologist, is that he's in danger of losing his sight, which would make it impossible for him to continue his work.

Nevertheless, they develop a close friendship that grows into romance, when Peter realizes that Terri is the only woman who can tolerate his strong anti-feminist opinions. When she rejects his plan of a sexual relationship conducted exclusively at his bachelor pad (so that he doesn't have to bond with her demanding family), he reluctantly proposes to her. They get married and he moves into her apartment, but her rogue ex-husband Stephen appears to spend more time with their children. Stephen and Peter clash at first, but they soon become good drinking friends, much to Terri's disapproval. Peter also begins to bond with David, who has had no stable male role model with his father perpetually off photographing war zones.

Peter's eyesight gradually worsens and his boss, Howard Mann, begins to criticize his work. On the advice of his ophthalmologist, Peter schedules an operation that could cure his problem, and tries to keep it a secret from Terri to avoid worrying her. Howard gets hysterical and inadvertently ruins Peter's alibi of working away from home on a book. Terri tells him that she had known that Peter was going blind before they ever got involved. This revelation enrages Peter, and he accuses her of only going to bed with him out of pity. She says she never once felt sorry for him, but his pride is too wounded to accept this.

The operation is partly successful in restoring Peter's vision, and he moves out of the house to his old studio to begin work on a new book, The Last Flower.

Stephen is killed on assignment, which traumatizes everyone, but Linda in particular. Her stammer is getting progressively worse. Terri insists she go talk to Peter, who takes her on an imaginary visual tour of his new book—which is about war and human stupidity, but also love and hope and restoration. She begins to conquer her stammer, and he realizes he was wrong to leave his new family, who need him. He meets Terri at a party related to the release of his new book, and they renew their bond. Much against his misanthropic nature, he is forced to rejoin humanity.

== Cast ==
- Jack Lemmon as Peter Edward Wilson
- Barbara Harris as Theresa Alice Kozlenko
- Jason Robards as Stephen Kozlenko
- Herb Edelman as Howard Mann
- Lisa Gerritsen as Linda Kozlenko
- Moosie Drier as David Kozlenko
- Severn Darden as Dr. Harris
- Lisa Eilbacher as Caroline Kozlenko
- Lucille Meredith as Mrs. Schenker
- Ruth McDevitt as Old Woman
- Lea Marmer as Old Hag
- Joey Faye as Delivery boy
- Alan DeWitt as Man
- John Zaremba as Minister
- Richard Gates as Bernie (as Rick Gates)
- Janya Braunt as Nurse
- Olive Dunbar as Woman at Literary Tea
- Margaret Muse as Woman at Literary Tea
- Bill Hickman as Large Gentleman (as William Hickman)
- Joyce Brothers as Herself (as Dr. Joyce Brothers)
- Danny Arnold as Manhattan Policeman
- Burt Richards as Book Salesman

== Award nomination ==
The screenplay by Melville Shavelson and Danny Arnold was nominated for a Writers Guild of America Award for Best Comedy Written Directly for the Screen.

== Home media ==
Like many other films in the Cinema Center catalog, The War Between Men and Women was long unavailable on home video, with the exception of a brief release on VHS in 1999, although it was shown on television. It was released to DVD by Paramount Pictures Home Entertainment on January 28, 2014, as a Region 1 widescreen DVD. It was released on Blu-ray in 2016 by Kino Lorber.

== See also ==
- List of American films of 1972
