= K. (novel) =

1915 crime novel by Mary Roberts Rinehart

- Universal Jewel Pictures Photoplay cover art (1924)
- Author: Mary Roberts Rinehart
- Language: English
- Genre: Novel
- Publisher: Houghton Mifflin
- Publication date: 1915
- Publication place: United States
- Media type: Print (Hardback)
- Pages: 410
- OCLC: 39111410

K. is a 1915 crime novel by the American writer Mary Roberts Rinehart (1876–1958) set in post-Victorian era Allegheny, Pennsylvania, which has been a part of the city of Pittsburgh since 1907.

K. is a romance set in the industrial Victorian era. The novel tells the story of Sidney; when Sidney takes in a boarder with the initial "K", her life becomes entwined with the mystery surrounding "K". Lies and intrigue surround Sidney.

A film version of the novel K – The Unknown starring Virginia Valli and Percy Marmont, was released on 17 November 1924 by Universal Pictures as a "Universal Jewel" release. Another film version was released under the title The Doctor and the Woman in 1918.
