= The Doctor and the Woman =

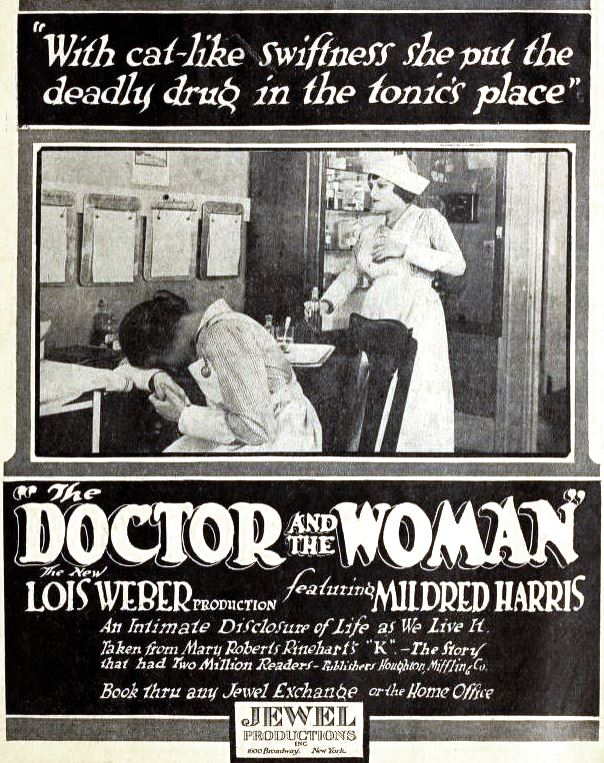
- Advertisement
- Directed by: Phillips Smalley; Lois Weber
- Written by: Lois Weber; Phillips Smalley
- Based on: K. by Mary Roberts Rinehart
- Starring: Mildred Harris
- Cinematography: Allen G. Siegler
- Production company: Lois Weber Productions
- Distributed by: Universal Film Manufacturing Company (Jewel Productions)
- Release date: April 14, 1918
- Running time: 1 hr. (6 reels)
- Country: United States
- Language: Silent (English intertitles)

The Doctor and the Woman is a lost 1918 American silent mystery film directed by Phillips Smalley and Lois Weber. It starred Mildred Harris and True Boardman and was produced by Weber and Universal Film Manufacturing Company as a Jewel Production. Universal distributed the film. The film is based on the 1915 novel K. by Mary Roberts Rinehart.

== Cast ==
- Mildred Harris as Sidney Page
- True Boardman as "K"
- Alan Roscoe as Dr. Max Wilson
- Zella Caull as Carlotta
- Carl Miller as Joe Drummond
- Esther Ralston
