= True Boardman =

American actor

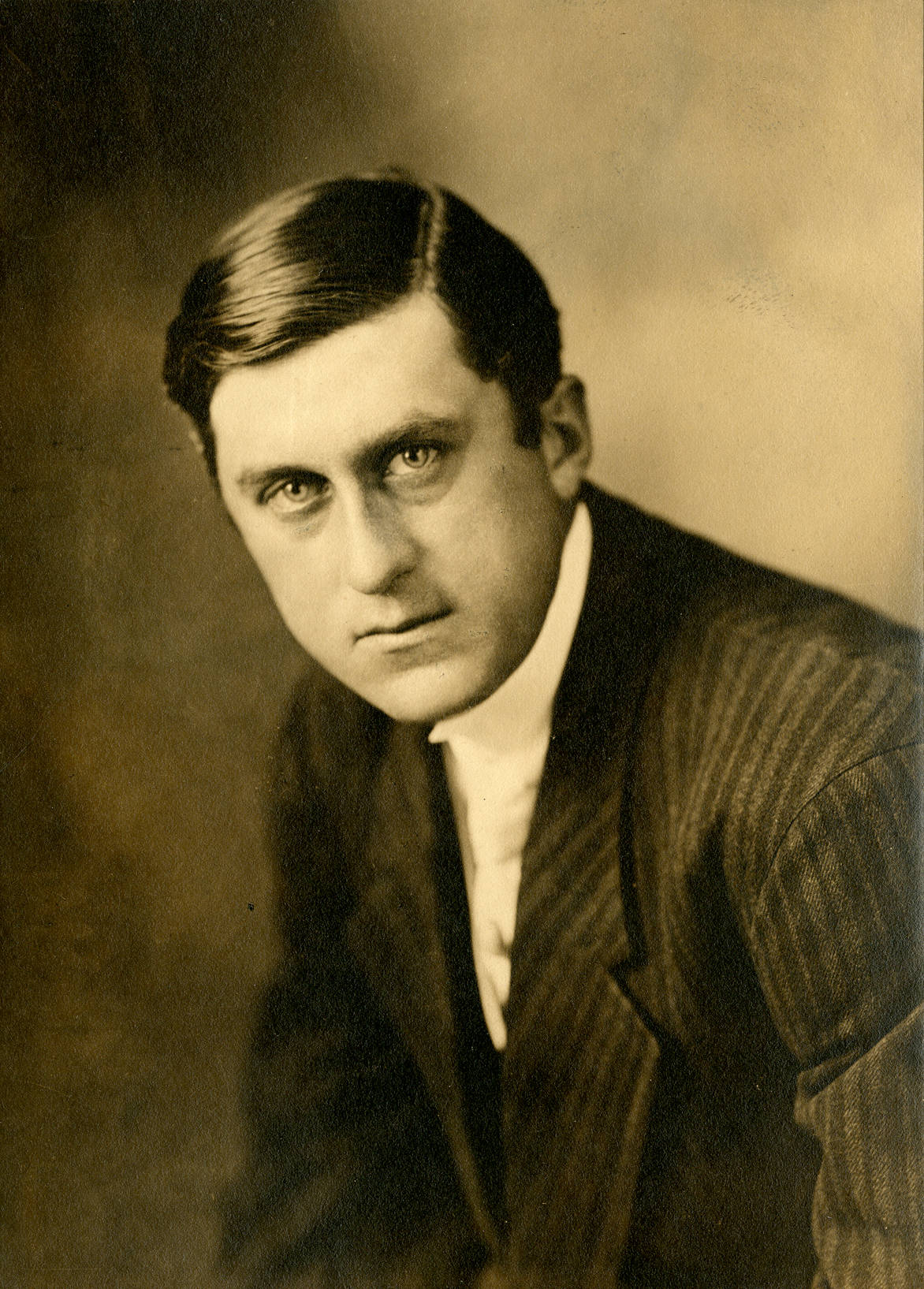
- Boardman in 1910
- Born: William True Boardman; April 21, 1882; Oakland, California
- Died: September 28, 1918 (aged 36); Los Angeles, California
- Occupations: Stage and film actor
- Years active: 1911–1918
- Spouse: Virginia True Boardman (m. 1909)
- Children: True Boardman Jr.
- Relatives: Lisa Gerritsen (great-granddaughter)

William True Boardman (April 21, 1882 – September 28, 1918) was an American film actor of the silent era. He appeared in more than 130 films between 1911 and 1919 before falling victim to the 1918 flu pandemic.

== Biography ==
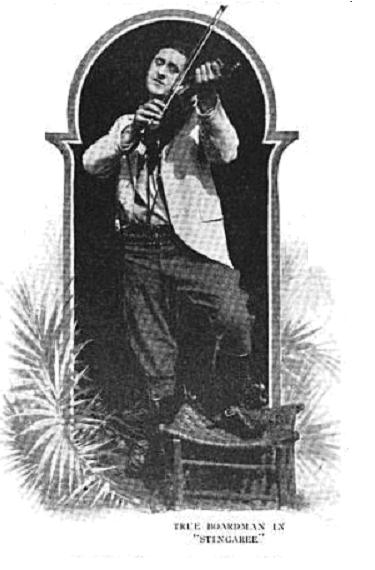
Boardman in Stingaree (1915)

True Boardman was born in Oakland, California, the son of William T. Boardman (1859–1886) and Bay Area actress Caroline "Caro" (née True) Boardman, and died at the age of 36 in Los Angeles, California. True Boardman began performing on stage in 1900 in Oakland and later spent some time doing theater work in Seattle before embarking on his film career.

He was the husband of actress Virginia True Boardman (Margaret Shields) and the father of True Eames Boardman (1909–2003), who had a long career as a script writer for radio, film and television. As a boy True Eames Boardman had appeared in a number of films, including some starring Charlie Chaplin and Mary Pickford.

Boardman was the great-grandfather of actress Lisa Gerritsen.

== Partial filmography ==
- The Reward for Broncho Billy (1912) - The Sheriff
- The Hazards of Helen (1914)
- Mysteries of the Grand Hotel (1915) - Jack Hilton - Frances' Assistant [Ch. 3–8, 11]
- The Pitfall (1915) - Clive Westcott - District Attorney
- Stingaree (1915) - Irving 'Stingaree' Randolph
- The Social Pirates (1916)
- The Girl from Frisco (1916) - Congressman John Wallace
- The Further Adventures of Stingaree (1916) - Irving Randolph / Stingaree
- Tarzan of the Apes (1918) - John Clayton - Lord Greystoke
- The Doctor and the Woman (1918) - 'K'
- Danger Within (1918) - Gilbert Bolton
- The Romance of Tarzan (1918) - Lord Greystoke
- Terror of the Range (1919) - Broncho Haryigan
