= True Boardman (screenwriter) =

American actor (1909–2003)

- Born: True Eames Boardman; October 25, 1909; Seattle, Washington, U.S.
- Died: July 28, 2003 (aged 93); Pebble Beach, California, U.S.
- Occupations: Actor, scriptwriter
- Years active: 1912–1974
- Spouse(s): Thelma Joyce Hubbard (m. 1935; died 1978); Kathleen Gilmour (m. 1982)
- Parent(s): Virginia Eames; True Boardman
- Relatives: Lisa Gerritsen (granddaughter)

True Eames Boardman (October 25, 1909 – July 28, 2003) was an American actor and scriptwriter.

== Life and career ==
Boardman, whose given names were derived, respectively, from his paternal grandmother's maiden name and his mother's stage name, was born in Seattle, Washington. He was the only child of actress Virginia Eames and action-adventure star True Boardman. Boardman's education included a bachelor's degree in English literature from UCLA and a master's degree in theater from Occidental College.

He began acting in 1912 and had acted in six films by the age of 10. He acted with Charles Chaplin in "Shoulder Arms" in 1918. Boardman was a writer for Silver Theater, a dramatic anthology series on CBS radio in the 1930s and 1940s. On May 21 and May 28, 1939, he also appeared as an actor on the program, starring with Helen Hayes in "Crossroads for Two," a two-part drama.

During World War II, Boardman was an Army captain whose duties included creating radio programming for American troops via the Armed Forces Radio Service.

== Personal life and death ==
Boardman's first marriage, to radio/voiceover actress and television writer Thelma Joyce Hubbard, lasted from 1935 until her death following a long illness in 1978. Their union produced two daughters. The second and final marriage, dating from 1982 until his own death, was to Kathleen Gilmour.

On July 28, 2003, Boardman died in Pebble Beach, California, aged 94, survived by his wife and both daughters from the previous marriage, as well as six grandchildren, one of whom was former child actress Lisa Gerritsen.

== Selected filmography ==
=== As a writer ===
- Pardon My Sarong (1942)
- Arabian Nights (1942)
- The Painted Hills (1951)

=== As an actor ===
- Broncho Billy's Heart (1912)
- The Reward for Broncho Billy (1912)
- Broncho Billy Reforms (1913)
- Snakeville's Fire Brigade (1914)
- The Conquest of Man (1914)
- Sophie's Birthday Party (1914)
- The Hazards of Helen (1914)
- Shoulder Arms (1918) (in unused scenes)
- The Flirt (1922)
- Dan August

== Bibliography ==
- Holmstrom, John. The Moving Picture Boy: An International Encyclopaedia from 1895 to 1995, Norwich, Michael Russell, 1996, pp. 40 – 41.
