= Virginia True Boardman =

American actress

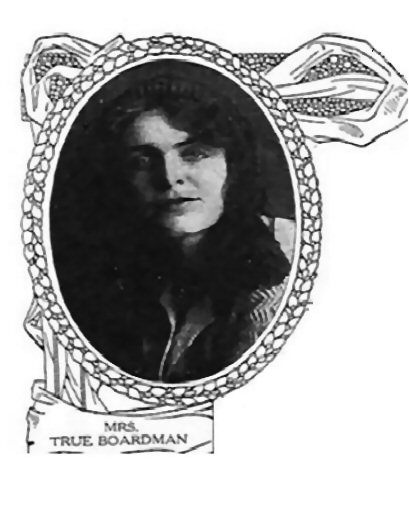
- Boardman in Motion Picture Story Magazine (August 1913)
- Born: Margaret Shields; May 23, 1889; Fort Davis, Texas, U.S.
- Died: June 10, 1971 (aged 82); Hollywood, California, U.S.
- Other name: Virginia Eames
- Occupation: Actress
- Years active: 1911–1936
- Spouse: True Boardman (m. 1909; died 1918)
- Children: True Boardman Jr.
- Relatives: Lisa Gerritsen (great-granddaughter)

Virginia True Boardman (born Margaret Shields, May 23, 1889 – June 10, 1971) was an American actress of the silent era.

== Biography ==
Born in Fort Davis, Texas as Margaret Shields, Boardman acted with the Streeter-Bryan company in 1908.

She went on to appear in 52 films between 1911 and 1936. Although her career started off strong, like many actresses of the silent film era she failed to make a successful transition to talking films, and by the mid-1930s her career was at its end for all practical purposes.

On January 16, 1909, she married actor True Boardman, and they remained wed until his death in 1918. The couple performed together in stock theater companies and in vaudeville. They had one child, True Eames Boardman, who after a brief acting career had a long career as a script writer for radio, film and television. He was also the grandfather of actress Lisa Gerritsen.

She died in Hollywood, California, aged 82, from a heart attack.

== Partial filmography ==
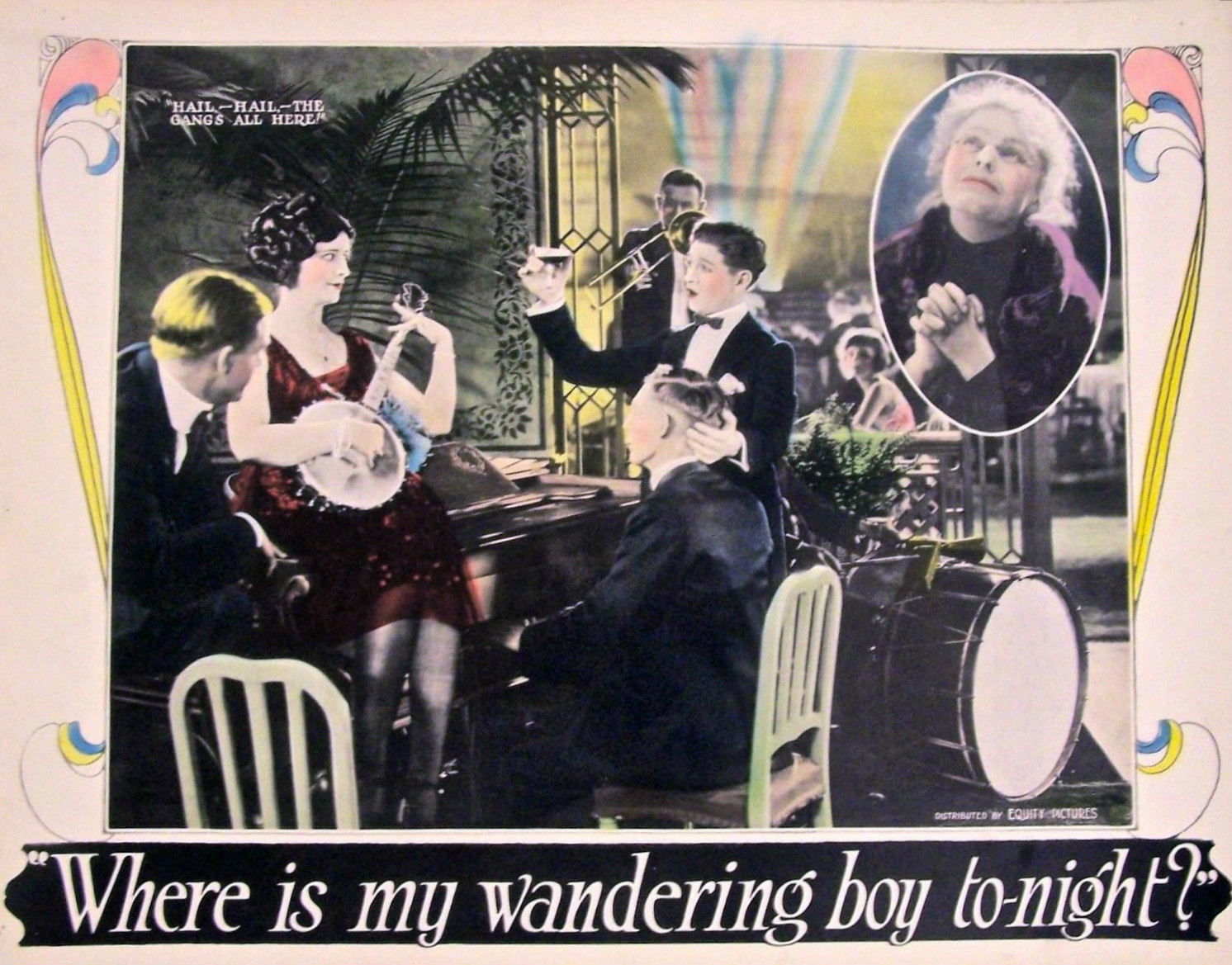
Lobby card featuring Boardman as the mother in Where Is My Wandering Boy Tonight? (1922)

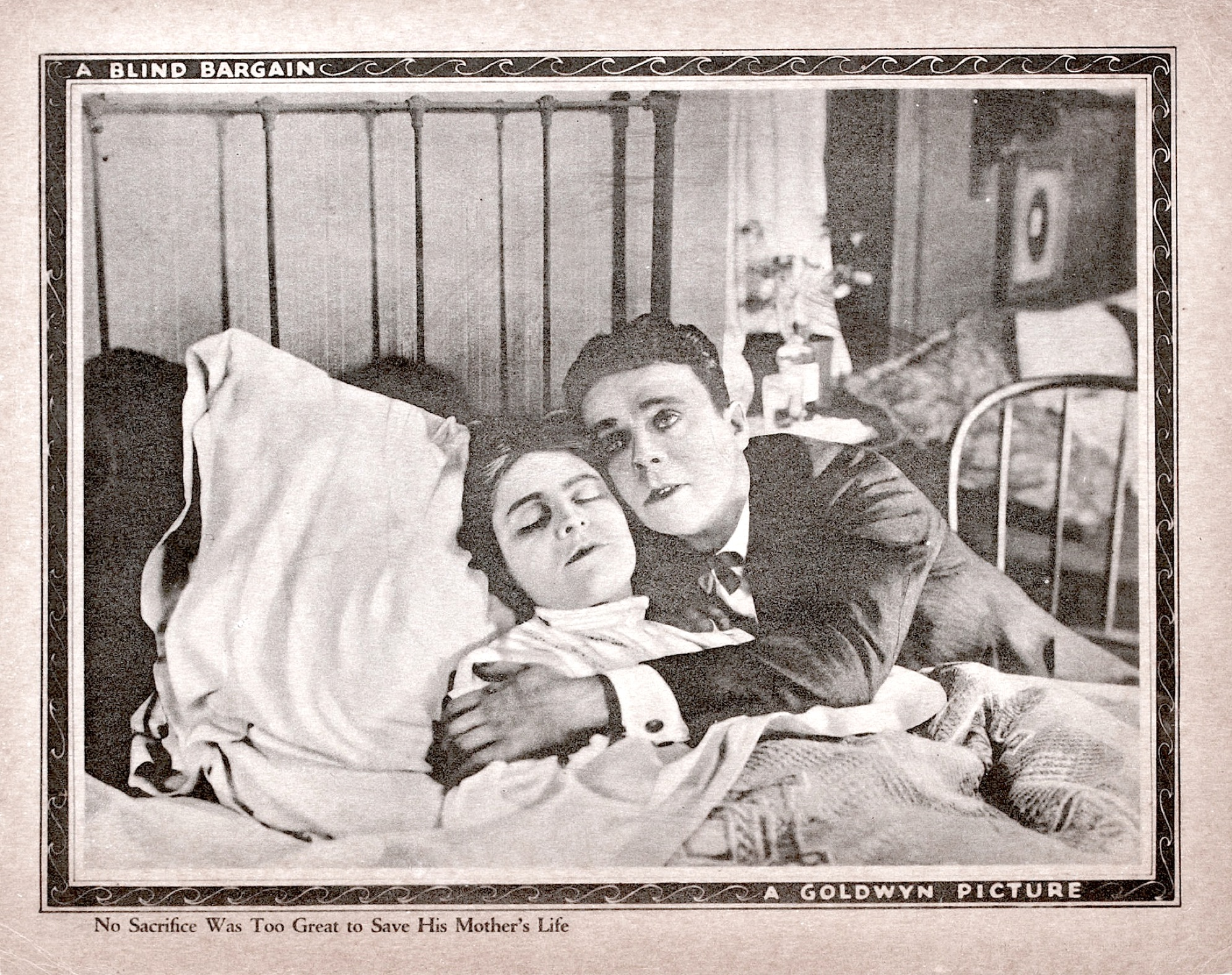
Boardman and Raymond McKee in A Blind Bargain (1922)

- The Tomboy on Bar Z (1912)
- The Light of Western Stars (1918)
- The Railroader (1919)
- The Village Blacksmith (1922)
- A Blind Bargain (1922)
- The Third Alarm (1922)
- Three Jumps Ahead (1923)
- Pioneer Trails (1923)
- The Barefoot Boy (1923)
- The Gunfighter (1923)
- The Mailman (1923)
- The Tomboy (1924)
- The Test of Donald Norton (1926)
- King of the Jungle (1927)
- Down the Stretch (1927)
- Speedy Smith (1927)
- The Lady Lies (1929)
- Scareheads (1931)
- The Penal Code (1932)
- Sister to Judas (1932)
- The Big Chance (1933)
- Pardon My Pups (1934)
- The Road to Ruin (1934)
- The Crime Patrol (1936)
- Brand of the Outlaws (1936)
- The Fugitive Sheriff (1936)
