= Stuart Buchanan =

American actor (1894–1974)

- Born: Paul Stuart Buchanan Sr. March 18, 1894; Eldora, Iowa, U.S.
- Died: February 4, 1974 (aged 79); Shaker Heights, Ohio, U.S.
- Education: College of Wooster and Harvard University
- Occupations: Educator, actor, announcer, radio and TV producer
- Years active: 1935–1973
- Spouse(s): Anna Hall Hilditch and Rita Whearty
- Children: 6

Stuart Buchanan (March 18, 1894 – February 4, 1974) was an American voice actor, announcer, radio and TV producer, advertising executive, athlete, and educator. He is known for his work at The Walt Disney Company as a casting director and voicing the Huntsman in the animated film Snow White and the Seven Dwarfs (1937) and voicing Goofy in The Mickey Mouse Theater of the Air (1938).

Buchanan produced the Ohio Story radio and TV series (1953–1961). In its time, the series held the record for the longest-running regional scripted radio and television series in the nation.

== Early years ==
Born Paul Stuart Buchanan in Eldora, Iowa. His father, the late Rev. Edgar Lloyd Buchanan, was a Presbyterian minister in Wooster, Ohio. Buchanan graduated from the College of Wooster and received a doctorate from Harvard University He served as a U.S. Army officer for two years in World War I (1917–1919). His mother was Nelly Mae Smith.

Early in his career, he taught poetry and drama at the University of Florida and West Virginia University. During those tenures, he also directed Little Theatre productions. While he taught at the University of Florida, Buchanan helped to launch the school's radio station.

== Hollywood ==
Around 1930, he moved to Hollywood, where he acted in eight movies for Paramount Pictures, mostly in "tough guy" roles. In May 1930, Buchanan was program director at radio station KHJ in Los Angeles. He directed episodes of the radio programs Hollywood Hotel and Lux Radio Theatre. He also worked for ABC radio as program supervisor and as head of the script department. On stage, he toured in a production of Mister Antonio, acted in summer stock theatre in Denver, and acted and directed at the Pasadena Playhouse.

Buchanan was a dialogue and casting director at Walt Disney Studios. For a time, he was in charge of all foreign versions of Disney productions. He is known for voicing The Huntsman in the 1937 Disney animated film Snow White and the Seven Dwarfs. Buchanan also served as musical director for the Disney studio. In that capacity, he worked with Leopold Stokowski and others to create the animated movie Fantasia, and ran an internal contest among employees to name the film. He also did the voice of the carnival barker in Pinocchio, the flight attendant in Saludos Amigos, the voice of Goofy in the 1938 radio show The Mickey Mouse Theater of the Air, and Grumpy in the Lux Radio Theatre Christmas 1938 production of Snow White.

In the 1940s, Buchanan headed the script department and program supervision for American Broadcasting Company in New York before taking a job directing the radio and television department of the McCann-Erickson advertising agency in Cleveland, Ohio, in 1947.

== The Ohio Story Radio and TV Series ==
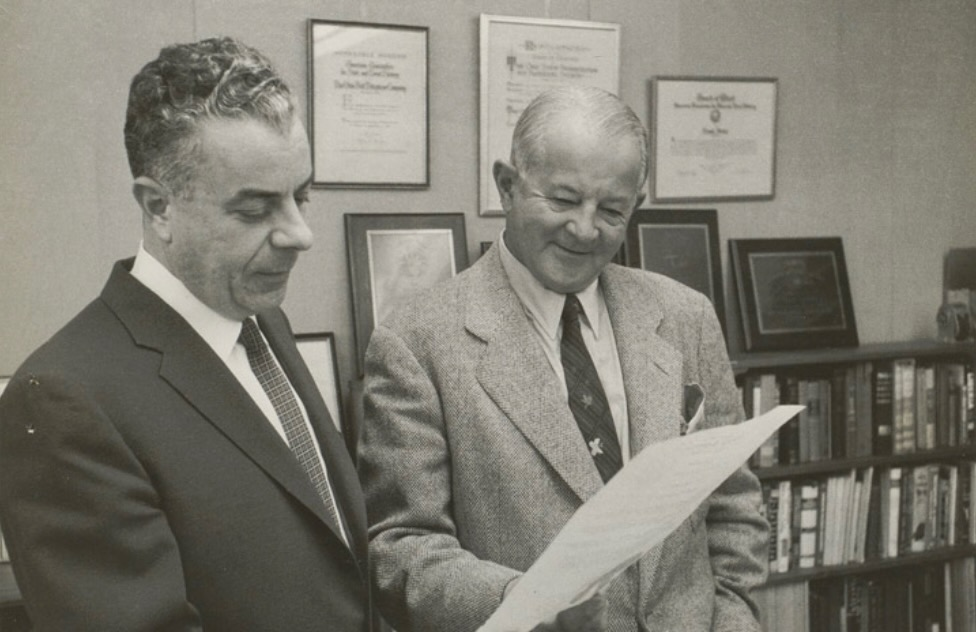
Frank Siedel (left) was the scriptwriter and Stuart Buchanan was the producer for 1,300 radio and 175 TV episodes of the Ohio Story. Photo courtesy of the Hagley Museum & Library.

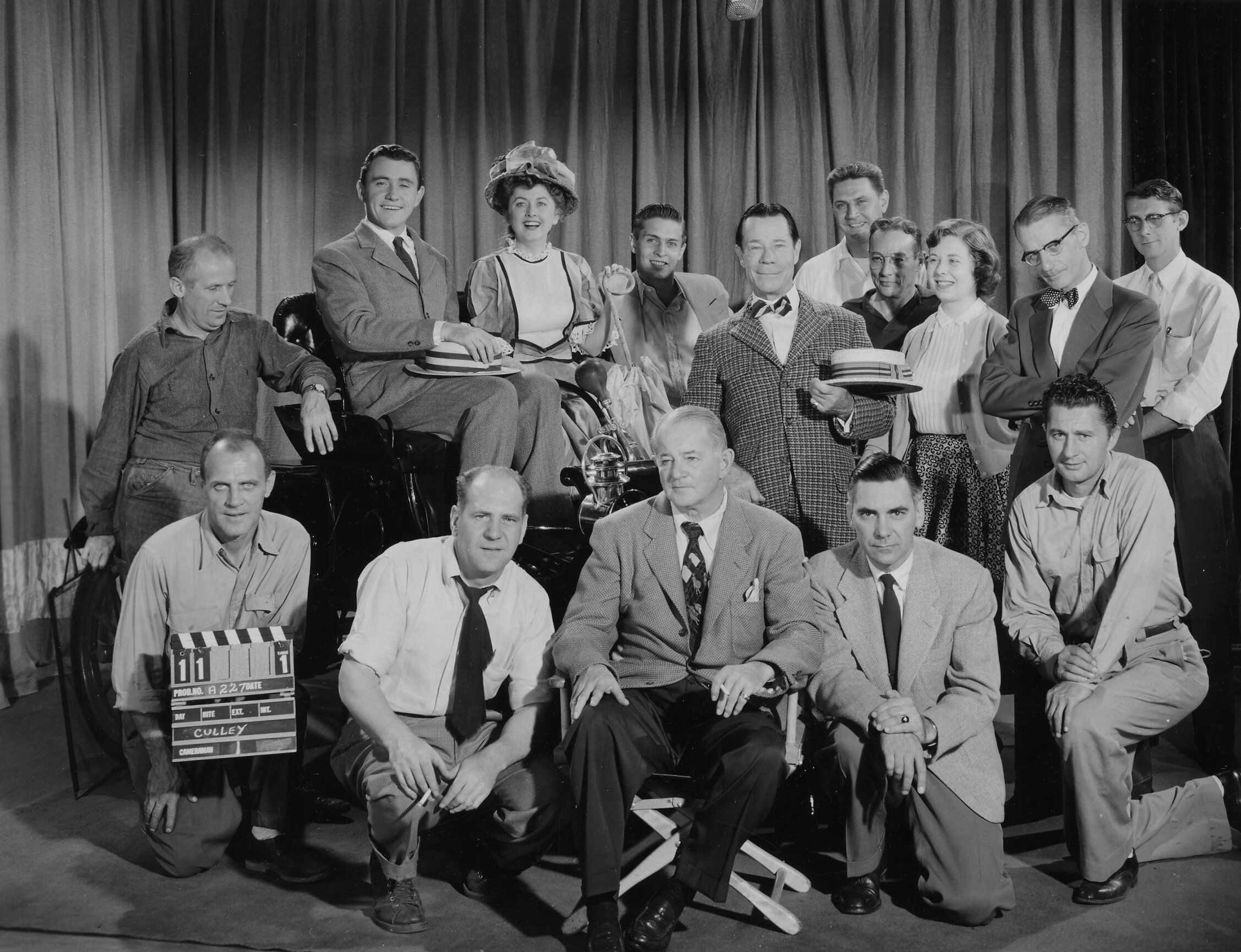
Stuart Buchanan, producer of the film Milestones of Motoring seated in front row (1954), with the film's cast and crew. Photo courtesy of the Hagley Museum & Library.

Buchanan was co-creator of The Ohio Story, a series that ran from 1947 to 1955 on radio and from 1953 to 1961 on TV. He picked Robert Waldrop to narrate the series, and actor Nelson Olmsted to replace him in 1952. Additionally, he chose Ray Culley of Cinécraft Productions, a Cleveland-based sponsored film studio, to direct the series. Approximately 1,300 radio and 175 Ohio Story TV episodes were produced.

In an interview with Todd Raper of the Columbus (Ohio) Dispatch, Buchanan said: "There has never been – or will be, a radio series that commanded the respect and attention of this state, or, for that fact, the nation. The Ohio Story reached its peak in the heyday of radio - the late 1940s. Only one show in the nation had a higher rating - that was the Jack Benny show. I guess of all the things I've done in my lifetime, I'm most proud to have had a hand in developing and producing The Ohio Story".

== Civic activities and Personal life ==
In his role at the McCann-Marschalk agency, Buchanan helped organize and publicize the Sabin Oral Sundays campaign, which vaccinated 1.5 million Clevelanders against polio over three Sundays in the summer of 1962. Dr. Albert Sabin said the Cleveland campaign's success was “the most extraordinary response I have ever heard anywhere.”

Buchanan married Anna Hall Hilditch and later Rita J. Whearty. He had 6 children - 4 sons and 2 daughters. He died on February 4, 1974, in Shaker Heights, Ohio, at age 79, and was buried in Wooster, Ohio.

== Filmography ==
Year	Title	Role	Notes
1935	Super-Speed	Announcer	Voice, uncredited
1937	Moose Hunters	Goofy (some lines)	Voice, short film; uncredited
1937	Snow White and the Seven Dwarfs	Huntsman	Voice, uncredited
1938	The Mickey Mouse Theater of the Air	Grumpy	Voice
1938	Snow White and the Seven Dwarfs Lux Radio Theatre	Goofy	Voice
1940	Pinocchio	Carnival Barker	Voice, uncredited
1943	Saludos Amigos	Flight Attendant	Voice, uncredited
1947–1955	The Ohio Story Radio Series	Producer	1,309 episodes
1951	Demonstrate to Sell Rings the Bell	Co-star in the Westinghouse sales training film	uncredited
1953–1961	The Ohio Story Television Series	Producer	179 episodes
