= Donald's Better Self =

1938 Donald Duck cartoon

- Title frame
- Directed by: Jack King
- Story by: Carl Barks; Harry Reeves; Jack Hannah; Tom Armstrong
- Produced by: Walt Disney
- Starring: Clarence Nash; Thelma Boardman; Don Brodie
- Music by: Oliver Wallace
- Animation by: Don Towsley; Paul Allen; Bernard Wolf; Jack Hannah; Ed Love; Chuck Couch
- Color process: Technicolor
- Production company: Walt Disney Productions
- Distributed by: RKO Radio Pictures
- Release date: March 10, 1938; (USA)
- Running time: 8:25
- Country: United States
- Language: English

Donald's Better Self is a 1938 Disney cartoon featuring Donald Duck. This 8-minute short premiered on March 10, 1938, and was distributed by RKO Radio Pictures.

The cartoon puts Donald in the role of a child, rather than his usual status as an adult. The storyline was adapted from a planned Silly Symphony cartoon about a young boy.

== Plot ==
Donald is fast asleep in his bed. As he turns in his sleep, his Conscience takes a form of its own beside him. She looks exactly like Donald, but wears a white robe and a golden halo. She also has a kinder and gentler voice than Donald. The Conscience tries to get Donald up and out of bed so he won't be late for school, but Donald's Anti-Conscience appears to keep Donald in bed. He has a different voice than Donald's and has a devil form with horns. He easily convinces Donald to stay in bed, but the Conscience wins out and walks with Donald to school.

Along the way, Donald is tempted by the Anti-Conscience to skip out on school and go fishing instead. At the fishing hole, the Anti-Conscience pressures him to smoke a pipe, which causes him to get sick. Soon the Conscience arrives looking for Donald. She finds him sick, and she gets angry at the Anti-Conscience for Donald's misfortune. The Anti-Conscience soon realizes he's in trouble when he sees the Conscience behind him. "You!! This is all your work!" says the Conscience to the Anti-Conscience, who nervously convinces the Conscience not to hurt him. The Conscience refuses, but after the Anti-Conscience deliberately tricks her, proceeds to fight the Anti-Conscience to teach him a lesson. Donald finally learns to do the right thing and go to school rather than give in to temptation.

== Voice cast ==
- Donald Duck: Clarence Nash
- Donald's Angel: Thelma Boardman
- Donald's Devil: Don Brodie

== Home media ==
The short was released on May 18, 2004, on Walt Disney Treasures: The Chronological Donald, Volume One: 1934-1941.

== In other media ==
- This short was one of the many featured in Donald Duck's 50th Birthday, but the short is shown in Japanese to illustrate Donald's global appeal.
- A clip of this cartoon can be seen in Flubber.
- This cartoon was shown in the 1960 Walt Disney Presents episode, "This is Your Life, Donald Duck".

== Legacy ==
Some elements from the short provided the basis for Donald's Decision.
