= The Village Blacksmith (1922 film) =

1922 film directed by John Ford

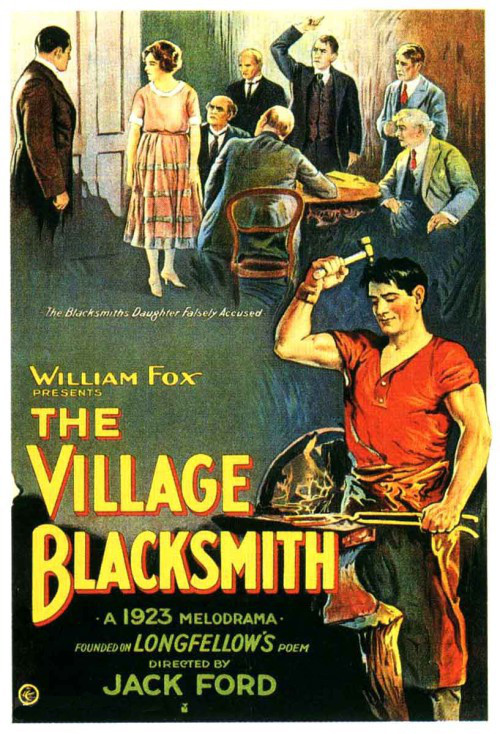
- Film poster
- Directed by: John Ford
- Written by: Paul Sloane
- Based on: "The Village Blacksmith" by Henry Wadsworth Longfellow
- Produced by: William Fox
- Starring: Will Walling; Virginia True Boardman
- Cinematography: George Schneiderman
- Production company: Fox Film Corporation
- Distributed by: Fox Film Corporation
- Release date: November 2, 1922 (New York)
- Running time: 8 reels (approx. 80 mins)
- Country: United States
- Language: Silent (English intertitles)

The Village Blacksmith is a 1922 American silent melodrama film directed by John Ford and produced and distributed by Fox Film Corporation. One of the eight reels survives at the UCLA Film & Television Archive, and therefore the film is considered to be lost. It was loosely adapted from the poem of the same name by Henry Wadsworth Longfellow.

== Plot ==
Surviving reel

As young men, the squire and the village blacksmith are in love with the same woman, whom the blacksmith marries. This angers the squire. Years later, the squire's son Anson dares the blacksmith's son Johnnie to climb a tree, from which he falls and is crippled.

As adults, Anson and the blacksmith's daughter Alice fall in love, which angers the blacksmith, who chastises his daughter. The blacksmith's other son Bill returns from college and is injured in a train accident. Anson steals $840 from a church fund, which is currently in Alice's possession. Alice is struck by lightning. The blacksmith take Anson and the squire to church where they both repent.

== Cast ==
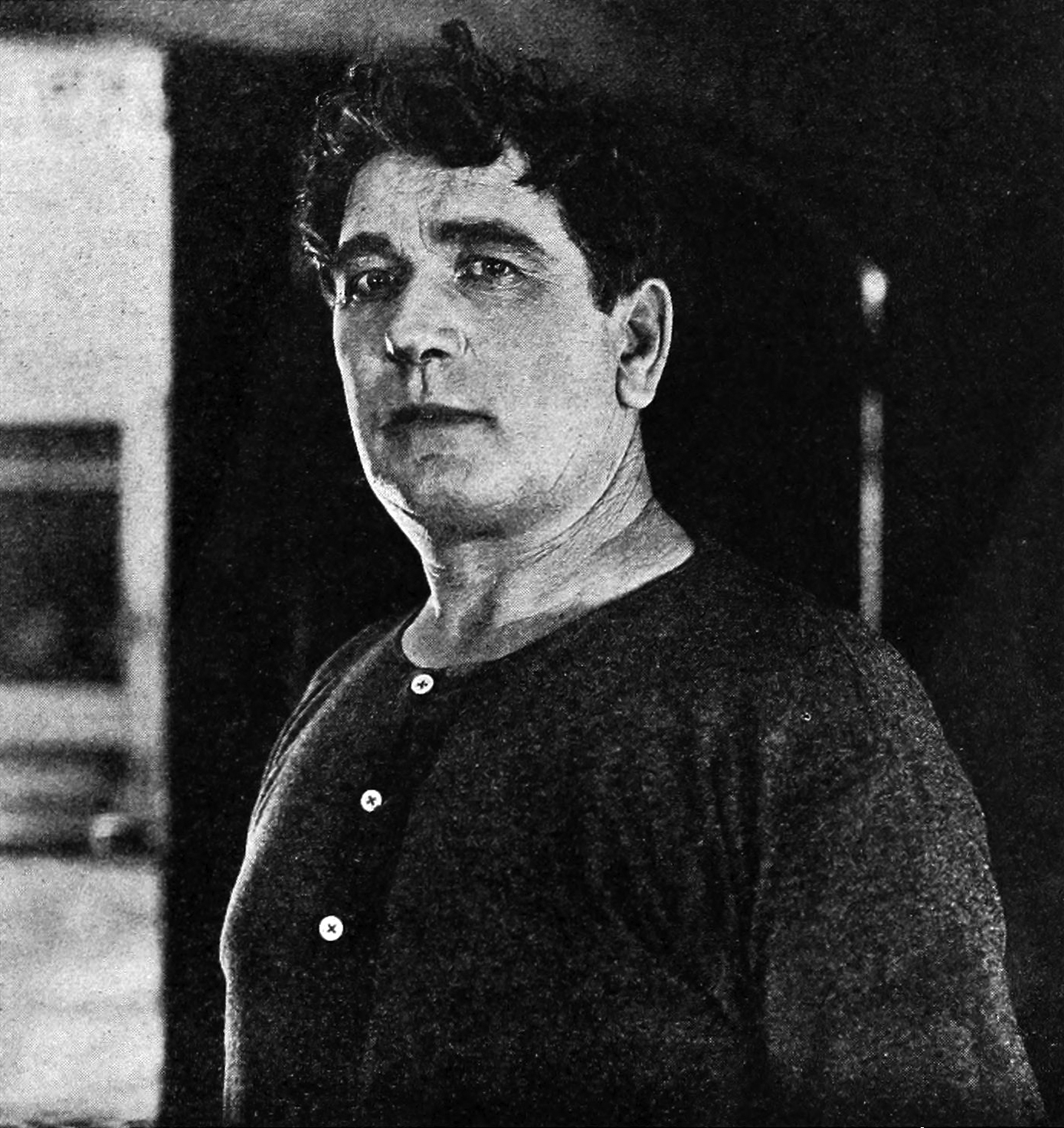
William Walling in the title role

- William Walling as John Hammond, blacksmith
- Virginia True Boardman as Mrs. John Hammond
- Virginia Valli as Alice Hammond, the daughter
- Ida Mae McKenzie as Alice as a child
- David Butler as Bill Hammond, the son
- Gordon Griffith as Bill as a child
- George Hackathorne as Johnnie Hammond, another son
- Pat Moore as Johnnie as a child
- Tully Marshall as Ezra Brigham, the squire
- Ralph Yearsley as Anson Brigham, the son
- Henri De La Garrique as Anson as a child
- Francis Ford as Asa Martin
- Bessie Love as Rosemary Martin, the daughter
- Helen Field as Rosemary as a child
- Lon Poff as Gideon Crane
- Mark Fenton as Dr. Brewster
- Cordelia Callahan as Aunt Hattie
- Caroline Rankin as squire's wife
- Eddie Gribbon as the village gossip
- Lucille Hutton as the flapper from the city

== Reception ==
The film was well received by audiences and by reviewers alike. The photography was highly praised.
