= Snow White and the Seven Dwarfs (film) =

1937 film by David Hand

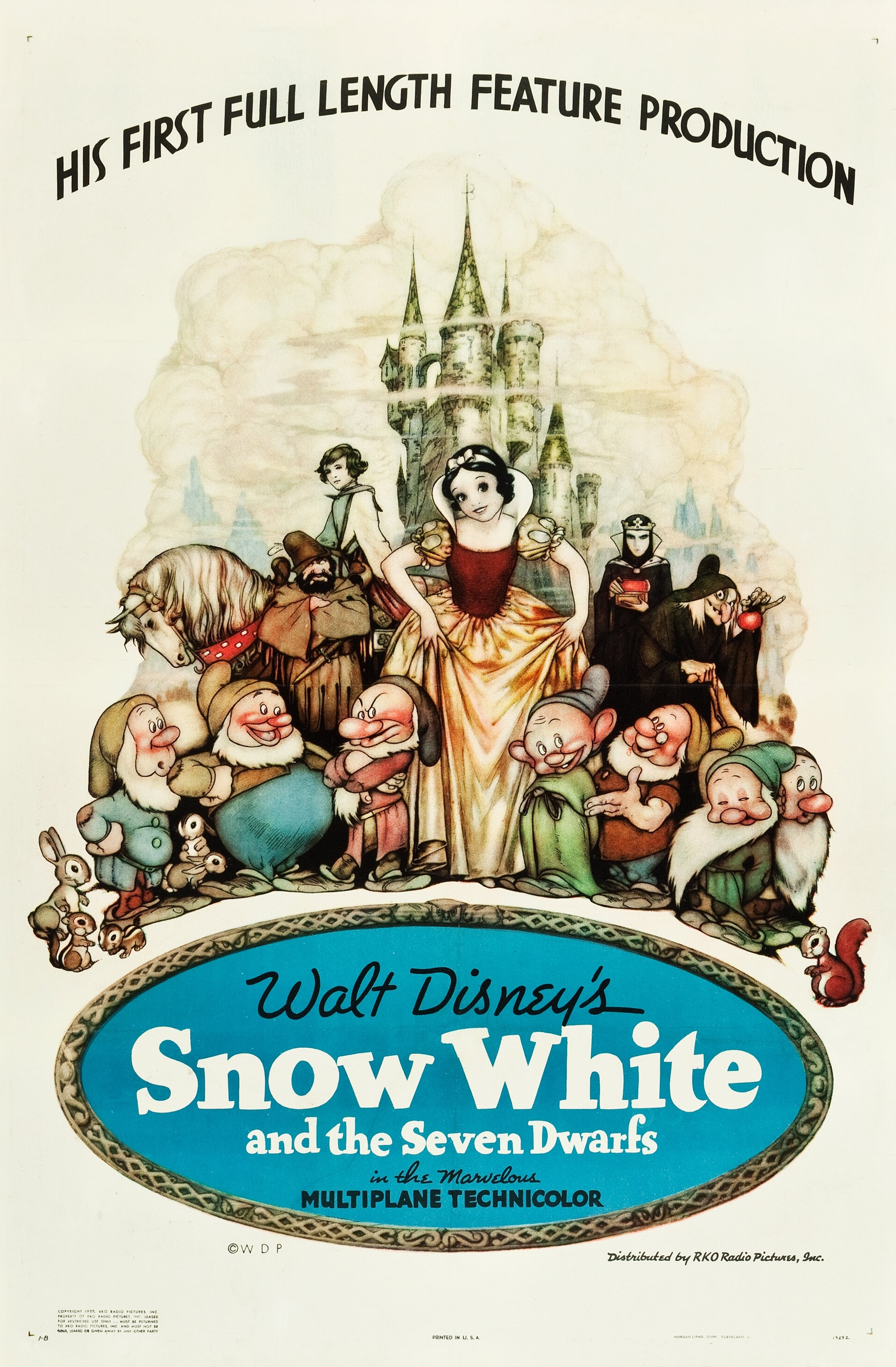
- Theatrical release poster by Gustaf Tenggren
- Directed by: Supervising Director; David Hand; Sequence Directors: Perce Pearce; William Cottrell; Larry Morey; Wilfred Jackson; Ben Sharpsteen
- Story by: Ted Sears; Richard Creedon; Otto Englander; Dick Rickard; Earl Hurd; Merrill De Maris; Dorothy Ann Blank; Webb Smith
- Based on: "Snow White" by the Brothers Grimm
- Produced by: Walt Disney
- Music by: Frank Churchill; Leigh Harline; Paul Smith
- Production company: Walt Disney Productions
- Distributed by: RKO Radio Pictures
- Release dates: December 21, 1937 (Carthay Circle Theatre); February 4, 1938 (United States)
- Running time: 83 minutes
- Country: United States
- Language: English
- Budget: $1.5 million
- Box office: $418 million

Snow White and the Seven Dwarfs is a 1937 American animated musical fantasy film produced by Walt Disney and released by RKO Radio Pictures, based on the 1812 German fairy tale "Snow White" by the Brothers Grimm. The film was supervised by David Hand and a team of five sequence directors: Perce Pearce, William Cottrell, Larry Morey, Wilfred Jackson, and Ben Sharpsteen. It is the first animated feature film produced in the United States and the first cel animated feature film.

Snow White premiered at the Carthay Circle Theatre in Los Angeles, California, on December 21, 1937, and went into general release in the United States on February 4, 1938. Despite initial doubts from the film industry, it was a critical and commercial success, with international earnings of more than $8 million during its initial release against a $1.5 million production cost, becoming the highest-grossing film of 1938, and briefly holding the record of the highest-grossing sound film of all time. It was also the highest-grossing animated film for 55 years. The popularity of the film has led to its being re-released theatrically many times, until its home video release in the 1990s. Adjusted for inflation, it is one of the top-ten performers at the North American box office and is still the highest-grossing animated film with an adjusted gross of $2,297,000,000. Worldwide, its inflation-adjusted earnings top the animation list. Snow White was nominated for Best Musical Score at the Academy Awards in 1938, and the next year, producer Walt Disney was awarded an honorary Oscar for the film. This award was unique, consisting of one normal-sized, plus seven miniature Oscar statuettes. They were presented to Disney by Shirley Temple.

Snow White was a landmark release in the early animation industry, and it is widely regarded as one of the greatest and most influential films ever made, credited with ushering in the golden age of animation. Disney's take on the fairy tale has had a significant cultural impact, resulting in popular theme park attractions, a video game, a Broadway musical, and a 2025 live-action film remake. In 1989, the United States Library of Congress deemed the film "culturally, historically, or aesthetically significant" and selected it as one of the inaugural 25 films for preservation in the National Film Registry. The American Film Institute ranked it among the 100 greatest American films, and also named the film as the greatest American animated film of all time in 2008.

== Plot ==
In 16th century Renaissance Europe, having lost both of her parents at a young age, Snow White is a princess living with her wicked and cold-hearted stepmother, the Queen. (Note: Disney publications of the 1930s, such as the film's comic strip adaptation, indicate that her actual name is Grimhilde.) Fearing that Snow White's beauty will outshine her own, the Queen forces her to work as a scullery maid and asks her Magic Mirror daily "who is the fairest one of all." For years, the mirror always answers that the Queen is, pleasing her.

One day, Snow White meets and falls in love with a prince who overhears her singing. That same day, the Magic Mirror deems Snow White as the fairest. The Queen orders her Huntsman to take Snow White into the forest, kill her, and bring back her heart in a jeweled box as proof. The Huntsman cannot bring himself to kill Snow White and warns her of the Queen's intentions. At his urging, Snow White flees deep into the forest.

Lost and frightened, Snow White is befriended by woodland animals, who lead her to a hidden woodland cottage. Finding seven small chairs in the cottage's dining room, Snow White assumes the cottage is the untidy home of seven orphaned children. With the animals' help, she proceeds to clean the place and cook a meal. Snow White soon learns that the cottage is the home of seven dwarfs named Doc, Grumpy, Happy, Sleepy, Bashful, Sneezy, and Dopey, who work in a nearby mine. Returning home, they are alarmed to find their cottage clean and suspect that an intruder has invaded their home. Snow White introduces herself and explains her predicament, and the dwarfs agree to let her stay for her protection. Snow White does the cooking and washing for the dwarfs while they mine for jewels during the day, and at night, they all sing, play music, and dance.

Back at the castle, the Magic Mirror reveals that Snow White is still living, and with the dwarfs. Enraged that the Huntsman gave her a pig's heart, the Queen uses a potion to disguise herself as an old peddler and then creates a poisoned apple that will put whoever eats it into Sleeping Death. She learns the curse can be broken by "love's first kiss," but is certain Snow White will be buried alive before this can happen. The Queen goes to the cottage while the dwarfs are away to work. The animals see through the disguise but are unable to warn Snow White; they rush off to find the dwarfs. The Queen fools Snow White into biting into the apple, and she falls into a death-like slumber.

The dwarfs return with the animals as the Queen leaves the cottage and give chase, trapping her on a cliff. She tries to roll a boulder onto them, but lightning strikes the cliff before she can do so, causing her to fall to her death. In their cottage, the dwarfs find Snow White asleep from the poison. Unwilling to bury her, they instead place her in a glass chamber in the forest. Together with the animals, they keep watch over her.

The following spring, the prince learns of Snow White's eternal sleep and visits the glass chamber. Saddened by her apparent death, he kisses her, breaking the spell and awakening her. The dwarfs and animals rejoice as the prince takes Snow White to his castle.

== Voice cast ==
Walt Disney introduces each of the Seven Dwarfs in the film's original 1937 theatrical trailer

- Adriana Caselotti as Snow White, a sweet and innocent young princess who is forced to hide from her stepmother in the cottage of the seven dwarfs.
- Lucille La Verne as the Queen, Snow White's jealous and wicked stepmother who is obsessed with being "the fairest one of all".
  - La Verne also voiced the Witch, the Queen's peddler disguise that she uses to trick Snow White.
- Roy Atwell as Doc, the pompous yet good-hearted leader of the seven dwarfs, who is prone to using malapropisms when he speaks.
- Pinto Colvig as Grumpy, the most stubborn and easily irritated of the dwarfs, who initially dislikes Snow White but grows to care for her as the film progresses.
  - Colvig also voiced Sleepy, the perpetually drowsy and most relaxed of the dwarfs.
- Otis Harlan as Happy, the perennially cheerful and most optimistic of the dwarfs.
- Scotty Mattraw as Bashful, the most sentimental and shyest of the dwarfs.
- Billy Gilbert as Sneezy, a dwarf who suffers from hay fever.
- Eddie Collins as Dopey, the clumsiest and most childlike of the dwarfs, who communicates through sounds and pantomime instead of speaking.
- Harry Stockwell as the Prince, a romantic young man who falls in love with Snow White and later saves her with a true love's first kiss.
- Moroni Olsen as the Magic Mirror, a mystical object containing the Queen's familiar spirit, from whom she learns that Snow White has become the "fairest one of all".
- Stuart Buchanan as the Huntsman, the Queen's reluctant servant, whom she orders to kill Snow White.

== Production ==
=== Development ===
Walt Disney conceived the idea of making his first feature-length film in 1933, when his animation studio was focusing on production of animated short films, such as the Silly Symphonies series. Although they were popular with the audience, Disney believed that the shorts did not bring enough profit for the further growth of the studio; he also saw the full-length film as a way to expand his "storytelling possibilities", allowing for elaborate plots and character development. By late March 1933, he was approached by Mary Pickford (co-founder of United Artists that was distributing Disney's works at the time) with a proposal for a feature-length animated/live-action version of Lewis Carroll's novel Alice's Adventures in Wonderland (1865); however, the project was soon scrapped when Paramount Pictures began production of their own film version. Disney then considered using the same concept for a film adaptation of Washington Irving's short story "Rip Van Winkle" (1819) starring Will Rogers, but it did not work out either due to Paramount, which held the rights to the story, refusing to give permission.

After the successful release of the Silly Symphony short Three Little Pigs in May 1933, Disney was strengthened in his decision to make a feature film and began introducing the idea to his staff through a "slow infiltration" – sharing it with everyone individually during casual conversations. He entered into negotiations with Merian C. Cooper to produce a full-length animated version of Victor Herbert's 1903 operetta Babes in Toyland in Technicolor; the project was offered to RKO Radio Pictures, which owned the rights to the play, but RKO executives rejected it. (Note: Disney eventually produced his version of Babes in Toyland as a live-action film, released in 1961.) In July 1933, Disney first revealed his plans on making a feature film to The Film Daily (although he had not yet managed to receive a response from the United Artists executives), and around the same time, he was approached with an offer for an animated version of Felix Salten's 1923 novel Bambi, a Life in the Woods in alliance with Sidney Franklin. Disney eventually rejected the idea, feeling that his studio was not ready for the technical challenges that Bambi would have presented. (Note: Disney eventually purchased the rights to Bambi, a Life in the Woods from Franklin in 1937, releasing his own animated version in 1942.) Homer's poems Iliad and Odyssey, as well as Jonathan Swift's 1726 book Gulliver's Travels, were also suggested to Disney at the time.

I don't know why I picked Snow White. It's a thing I remembered as a kid. I saw Marguerite Clark in it in Kansas City one time when I was a newsboy. They had a big showing for all the newsboys. And I went and saw Snow White. It was probably one of my first big feature pictures I'd ever seen. That was back in 1916 or something. Somewhere way back. But anyways, to me I thought it was a perfect story. I had the sympathetic dwarfs and things. I had the prince and the girl. The romance. I had the heavy. I just thought it was a perfect story.

— Walt Disney, on choosing "Snow White" for his first feature film

Disney settled on the Brothers Grimm's 1812 fairy tale "Snow White" in the spring of 1934. He had been familiar with the story since he was a teenager, having seen the 1916 silent film version, which he later cited as the primary reason for choosing "Snow White" for his first feature production. Disney had originally planned to produce Snow White as a Silly Symphony short, but reconsidered, believing that the story had enough potential for a feature film adaptation. He formally announced his plans on Snow White and the Seven Dwarfs to The New York Times in June 1934, estimating that the film could be produced for a budget of $250,000, which was roughly ten times the budget of an average Silly Symphony. The project (then known as the "Feature Symphony") was initially developed by a small unit of writers that Disney personally supervised, before it was introduced to the studio staff at large on October 30, 1934, when the basic story outline was completed. As some animators later recalled, Disney assembled them on the sound stage in the evening and acted out the entire story of Snow White for three hours, concluding with announcement of their first feature film.

Although the studio staff were excited about the project, they were unsure that the full-length cartoon would sustain an audience's attention. Ward Kimball said that they were told by Hollywood moguls (such as W. C. Fields) that "it was OK, six-seven minutes, like the shorts, but an hour and a half, no way! Big reason was that you run out of funny things to do, you had to have a laugh-a-minute. And the bright colors would hurt your eyes, everybody would get up and walk out ... Walt, of course, plugged ahead, he didn't believe that. He felt that if you had a solid story, not only laughs in it, but tragedy, it would go." Both Disney's wife Lillian and his brother Roy (who was also his business partner) attempted unsuccessfully to talk him out of it, and movie-industry insiders derisively referred to the film as "Disney's Folly" while it was in production.

=== Early writing ===
The earliest known story outline – titled "Manuscript" – was compiled by staff writer Richard Creedon on August 9, 1934, (Note: Some sources attribute the document's authorship to Walt Disney.) featuring twenty-one pages of suggestions for characters, scenes, and songs (including "Some Day My Prince Will Come"). At the time, Disney adopted a "wide-ranging approach", remaining open to any idea that could be proposed; notably, one of the suggestions included Snow White traveling through a series of enchanted sites – such as the Sleepy Valley, the Morass of Monsters, and the Valley of the Dragons – before arriving at the dwarfs' cottage. Snow White was originally envisioned to be more tomboyish, with the Queen described as "stately, beautiful in the way of a Benda mask ... a cool serene character who demonstrates her fury only in moments of great passion." One of the potential storylines developed for "Manuscript" involved the Queen imprisoning the Prince in her dungeon, after seeing his affection for Snow White, with the Prince later fighting his way out of her castle with "tricks that Doug Fairbanks would like to have thought." Other story suggestions included the Queen having a collection of her former enemies reduced to a few inches in size; a Gilbert and Sullivan-style musical number for the scene where the Queen orders the Huntsman to kill Snow White; and the sequence of the Queen trying to break the mirror upon learning that Snow White has survived, with the mirror detaching itself from the wall and smashing against the Queen after chasing her around the chamber. Disney also decided from the beginning that each of the Seven Dwarfs – whom he considered the "strongest lure" of the story because of their comedic potential – should have a distinctive personality, identified by a respective name; a pool of over fifty possibilities was compiled for "Manuscript" (with names such as Sleepy, Hoppy, Bashful, Happy, Sneezy-Wheezy, Biggo-Ego, and Awful as the top contenders).

In October 1934, Disney began holding weekly story meetings with a small unit of writers, which included Creedon, Larry Morey, Ted Sears, Albert Hurter, and Pinto Colvig. During the first meeting on October 3, several scenes were proposed: the "Soup Eating" (where Snow White has dinner with dwarfs) and "Bed Building" (where the dwarfs build a bed for Snow White) sequences; Snow White teaching the dwarfs to pray; and the climactic scene of the dwarfs chasing the disguised Queen, followed by her death from falling off a cliff. For the next meeting, held on October 9, a typed sheet was complied, featuring a redefined selection of names for the dwarfs – Wheezy, Jumpy, Baldy, Grumpy, Happy, Doc, and Sleepy – and their respective characteristics; several alternatives were also suggested, including Hickey, Sniffy, Stuffy, Shorty, Burpy, Tubby, Dizzy, and Dopey. From the outset, Disney decided to discard the part from the Grimms' original story where the Queen tries to kill Snow White with a tightly laced bodice, but considered retaining the other two attempts (with a poisoned comb and a poisoned apple), both of which were discussed at the meeting. The storyline of the Prince's imprisonment by the Queen, first introduced in "Manuscript", was also elaborated: after failing to kill Snow White with the comb, the Queen would throw the Prince into a dungeon and use magic to make the skeletons of her previous victims dance for him (identifying one skeleton as "Prince Oswald"). When the disguised Queen would have left for the dwarfs' cottage with the poisoned apple, Snow White's bird friends were to help the Prince escape from the dungeon, fight the Queen's guards, and find his horse; the Prince would then go after the Queen, taking the wrong road in the process. Other discussions included the dwarfs' discovery of Snow White in their cottage; two disguises for the Queen – a "fat, bulgy" peddler and a "thin, hawk-faced" witch – for each of her attempts to kill Snow White; and the scene of Snow White kissing the dwarfs goodbye before they leave for work. At the meeting, Disney also insisted that the writers refer to the dwarfs as "seven little men", which was maintained for the rest of the production.

Other examples of the more comical nature of the story at this point included suggestions for a "fat, batty, cartoon type, self-satisfied" Queen. The Prince was also more of a clown and was to serenade Snow White in a more comical fashion. Walt Disney encouraged all staff at the studio to contribute to the story, offering five dollars for every 'gag'; such gags included the dwarfs' noses popping over the foot of the bed when they first meet Snow White.

Disney became concerned that such a comical approach would lessen the plausibility of the characters and, sensing that more time was needed for the development of the Queen, advised in an outline circulated on November 6 that attention be paid exclusively to "scenes in which only Snow White, the Dwarfs, and their bird and animal friends appear". The names and personalities of the dwarfs, however, were still "open to change". A meeting on November 16 resulted in another outline entitled 'Dwarfs Discover Snowwhite', which introduced the character of Dopey, who would ultimately prove to be the most successful of the dwarf characterizations. In the original storyboard, Dopey was very talkative, but no suitable voice actors could be found. Mel Blanc was given a try without success. It was suggested to make him mute instead. For the rest of 1934, Disney further developed the story by himself, finding a dilemma in the characterization of the Queen, who he felt could no longer be "fat" and "batty", but a "stately beautiful type", a possibility already brought up in previous story meetings.

=== Reworking ===
Disney did not focus on the project again until the autumn of 1935. It was believed that the Silly Symphony short The Goddess of Spring (1934) may have placed doubt in his studio's abilities to animate a realistic girl. Apparently, a three-month trip to Europe that summer restored his confidence. At this point, Disney and his writers focused on the scenes in which Snow White and the dwarfs are introduced to the audience and each other. He laid out the likely assignments for everyone working on the film in a memorandum on November 25, 1935 and decided on the personalities of the individual dwarfs.

It had first been thought that the dwarfs would be the main focus of the story, and many sequences were written for the seven characters. However, at a certain point, it was decided that the main thrust of the story would be provided by the relationship between the Queen and Snow White. For this reason, several sequences featuring the dwarfs were cut from the film. The first, which was animated in its entirety before being cut, showed Doc and Grumpy arguing about whether Snow White should stay with them. Another, also completely animated, showed the dwarfs eating soup noisily and messily; Snow White unsuccessfully attempts to teach them how to eat 'like gentlemen'. A partially-animated sequence involved the dwarfs holding a "lodge meeting" in which they try to think of a gift for Snow White; this was to be followed by the elaborate 'bed-building sequence', in which the dwarfs and the forest animals construct and carve a bed for the princess. This was also cut, as it was thought to slow down the movement of the story. The soup-eating and bed-building sequences were animated by Ward Kimball, who was sufficiently discouraged by their removal to consider leaving the studio; Disney, however, persuaded him to stay by promoting Kimball to be the supervising animator of Jiminy Cricket in Disney's next feature, Pinocchio (1940).

=== Casting ===
I wanted to get a voice for Snow White that would be kind of away from every day. You know kind of off in another world. And I was hunting for a certain quality voice. So I had a boy searching for voices. He went everywhere. I wanted someone who could sing, too, because I was going to use a lot of songs. So he kept bringing these people in ... So one day he came in with a voice. I listened to it. I said "That's perfect." I said "She sounds to me like a 14-year-old girl." And he said "Well, she's 18. You know?" But that was it. It was a little girl called Adriana Caselotti and she came from an opera family ... She could do all this beautiful birdlike stuff. So I signed her.

— Walt Disney, on casting Adriana Caselotti as Snow White

Adriana Caselotti was the first audition for the role of Snow White in September 1934 at age 18. She was invited to audition after Disney's casting director Roy Scott telephoned her father (who was a vocal coach in Los Angeles) in search for voice talents, and Caselotti, overhearing their conversation, recommended herself for the part. Although Walt Disney was impressed with her voice, he auditioned about 150 other actresses and singers; these included Deanna Durbin, whom Disney rejected because he thought she sounded too mature. Virginia Davis was nearly hired to provide the speaking voice of Snow White (as well as the live-action reference for the character), but eventually dropped out due to finding the contract unacceptable, although some of Davis' miscellaneous vocal tracks were used in the final film. Caselotti was cast as Snow White in September 1935, exactly one year after her first audition, and recorded her first tracks on January 20, 1936. She was called in for forty-four days of recording sessions within two years, receiving $20 for each day (in total, Caselotti was paid $970). Thelma Hubbard provided Snow White's screams in the forest flight scene and later voiced the character in the film's 1938 Spanish dub and Lux Radio Theatre adaptation.

The studio auditioned over a dozen actresses for the role of the Queen before Lucille La Verne was chosen, although several members of Disney's staff contended that she sounded a "little old" for the part. Having portrayed similar characters in Orphans of the Storm (1921) and A Tale of Two Cities (1935), La Verne also tried out for the role of the Witch, and the animators initially felt that her voice was "too smooth and not rough enough" until she removed her false teeth. Snow White and the Seven Dwarfs marks La Verne's final film performance before her death in 1942. Kenny Baker was temporarily considered for the role of the Prince, with several other actors tested, before Harry Stockwell was cast in 1936. Reginald Barlow and Cy Kendall recorded the preliminary dialogue for the Huntsman, but both were deemed unsatisfactory for the final cut; the role was eventually given to Stuart Buchanan (who was hired by the studio as casting director and dialogue coach in 1936).

Story meeting notes from October 9, 1934 indicate that Eddie Holden and Billy Bletcher were initially considered for the role of Doc until Atwell was cast in early 1936. Radio actor John Gibson auditioned for the part of Sleepy and recorded some dialogue at a pre-recording session in February 1936. After reading about the casting in a Variety article, Billy Gilbert, who was known for his signature sneeze, telephoned Disney to try out for the role. Disney agreed to audition him and, upon witnessing Gilbert's "sneezing routine", hired him on the spot.

=== Animation ===
==== Art direction ====
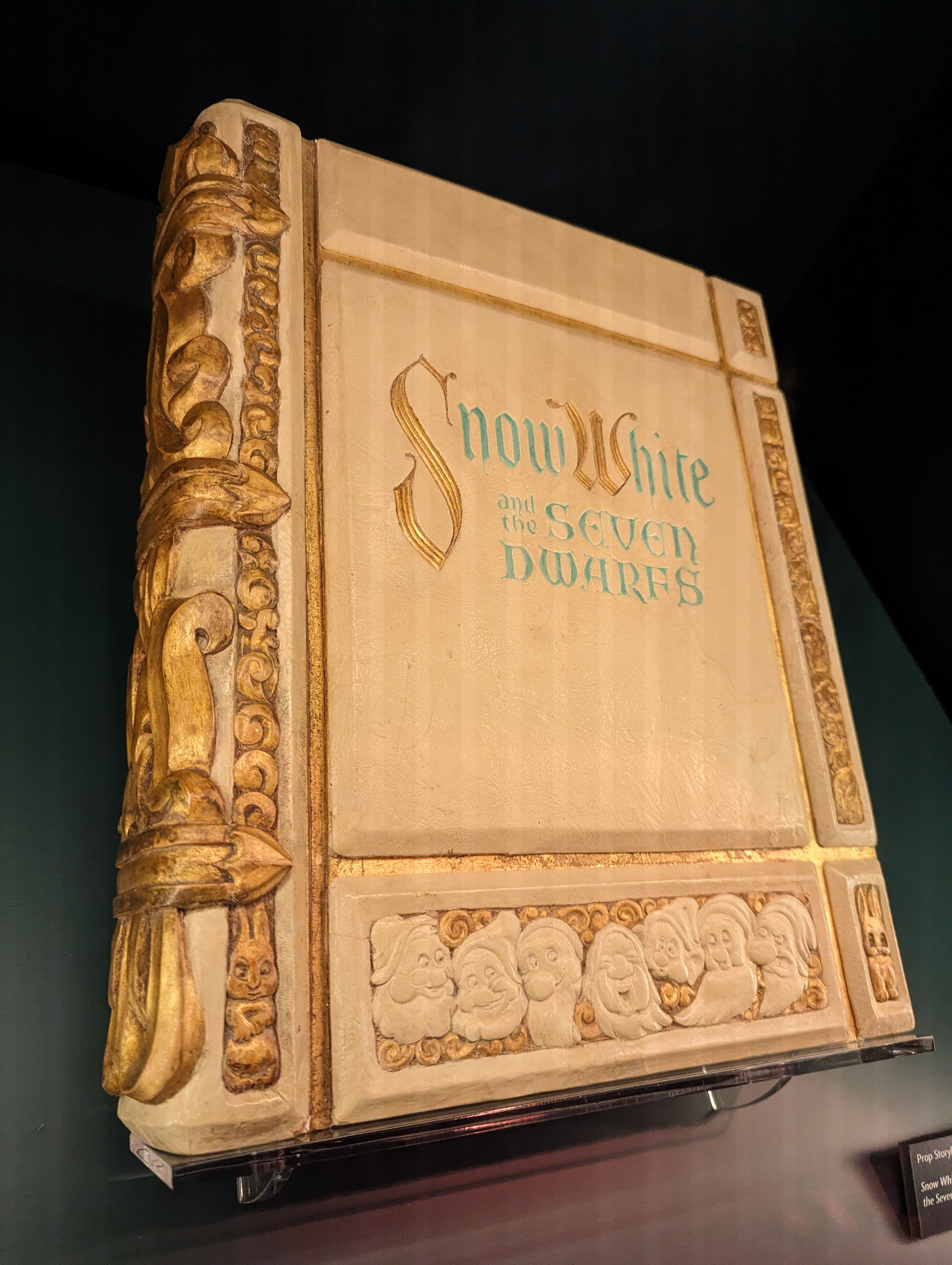
Screen-used prop, seen at the beginning of the film, in the collection of the Walt Disney Archives

Snow White and the Seven Dwarfs features contributions from three European artists who came to work at Walt Disney Studios in the 1930s. By 1936, Albert Hurter was assigned to supervise the film's art direction; all the designs used in the film, from character costume designs to layouts and backgrounds, had to meet his approval before being finalized. Having had academic art training, Hurter was instrumental in devising the film's overall Germanic look, incorporating European illustrations and painting techniques into the animation. Ferdinand Horvath, who had been working at the studio since 1934, was also hired as the film's inspirational sketch artist, providing a number of dark concepts for the film. Many of his other designs were ultimately rejected since they were less easily translated into animation than Hurter's, and Hovarth did not receive a credit for the film. By the spring of 1936, the animation process had begun, with Hurter and Hovarth being joined by Gustaf Tenggren. Tenggren, a color stylist, determined the staging and atmosphere of many of the scenes in the film, with his style borrowing from the likes of Arthur Rackham and John Bauer and thus possessing the European illustration quality that Disney sought. He also designed the posters for the film and illustrated the press book. Other artists to work on the film included Joe Grant, whose most significant contribution was the design for the Queen's Witch form.

==== Character animation ====
Don Graham really knew what he was teaching, and he "showed" you how to do something – he didn't just talk. He taught us things that were very important for animation. How to simplify our drawings – how to cut out all the unnecessary hen scratching amateurs have a habit of using. He showed us how to make a drawing look solid. He taught us about tension points – like a bent knee, and how the pant leg comes down from that knee and how important the wrinkles from it are to describe form. I learned a hell of a lot from him!

— Art Babbitt

Art Babbitt, an animator who joined the Disney studio in 1932, invited seven of his colleagues (who worked in the same room as him) to come with him to an art class that he himself had set up at his home in the Hollywood Hills. Though there was no teacher, Babbitt had recruited a model to pose for him and his fellow animators as they drew. These "classes" were held weekly; each week, more animators would come. After three weeks, Walt Disney called Babbit to his office and offered to provide the supplies, working space and models required if the sessions were moved to the studio. Babbitt ran the sessions for a month until animator Hardie Gramatky suggested that they recruit Don Graham, an art teacher from the Chouinard Institute. Graham taught his first class at the studio on November 15, 1932, and was joined by Philip L. Dike a few weeks later. These classes were principally concerned with human anatomy and movement, though instruction later included action analysis, animal anatomy and acting.

Though the classes were originally described as a "brutal battle", with neither instructor nor students well-versed in the other's craft, the enthusiasm and energy of both parties made the classes stimulating and beneficial for all involved. Graham often screened Disney shorts and, along with the animators, provided critique featuring both strengths and weaknesses. For example, Graham criticised Babbitt's animation of Abner the mouse in The Country Cousin as "taking a few of the obvious actions of a drunk without coordinating the rest of the body", while praising it for maintaining its humour without getting "dirty or mean or vulgar. The country mouse is always having a good time".

The first duty of the cartoon is not to picture or duplicate real action or things as they actually happen—but to give a caricature of life and action—to picture on the screen things that have run thru the imagination of the audience to bring to life dream-fantasies and imaginative fancies that we have all thought of during our lives or have had pictured to us in various forms during our lives [...] I definitely feel that we cannot do the fantastic things, based on the real, unless we first know the real. This point should be brought out very clearly to all new men, and even the older men.

— Walt Disney in 1935

Very few of the animators at the Disney studio had had artistic training (most had been newspaper cartoonists); among the few who did were Grim Natwick, who had trained in Europe. The animator's success in designing and animating Betty Boop for Fleischer Studios showed an understanding of human female anatomy and, when Walt Disney hired Natwick, he was given female characters to animate almost exclusively. Attempts to animate Persephone, the female lead of The Goddess of Spring, had proved largely unsuccessful; Natwick's animation of the heroine in Cookie Carnival showed greater promise, and the animator was eventually given the task of animating Snow White herself. Though live action footage of Snow White, with the Prince and the Queen being shot as reference for the animators, the artists' animators disapproved of rotoscoping, considering it to hinder the production of effective caricature. Nevertheless, all of the above-mentioned characters were fully rotoscoped and utilized by their respective artists, some more, some less. Despite Graham and Natwick's objections, however, some scenes of Snow White and the Prince were directly traced from the live-action footage.

It proved difficult to add color to Snow White's and the Queen's faces. Eventually, they found a red dye that worked and which was added with a small piece of cotton wrapped around a tipple pencil on each individual cel. Helen Ogger, an employee at the ink department, was also an animator and decided to use the same system used in animation. The method was so time-consuming that it was never used again on the same scale. It was also used to a smaller degree in Pinocchio and Fantasia but, after Ogger left the studio in 1941, there was no one else with the same expertise who could replace her.

=== Music and records ===
The songs in Snow White and the Seven Dwarfs were composed by Frank Churchill and Larry Morey. Paul J. Smith and Leigh Harline composed the incidental music score. Songs from the film include "Heigh-Ho", "Someday My Prince Will Come", and "Whistle While You Work". Since Disney did not have its own music publishing company at the time, the publishing rights for the music and songs were administered through Bourne Co. Music Publishers, which continues to hold these rights. In later years, the studio was able to acquire back the music rights from many of their other films, but not Snow White, Pinocchio, Dumbo or most Silly Symphony cartoons. Snow White became the first American film to have a soundtrack album, released in conjunction with the feature film.

=== Cinematic influences ===
At this time, Disney also encouraged his staff to see a variety of films. These ranged from the mainstream, such as MGM's Romeo and Juliet (1936)—to which Disney made a direct reference in a story meeting pertaining to the scene in which Snow White lies in her glass coffin—to the more obscure, including European silent cinema. Romeo and Juliet also inspired the balcony scene between Snow White and Prince Charming.

Snow White and the Seven Dwarfs, as well as the two Disney films to follow it, were influenced by such German expressionist films as Nosferatu (1922) and The Cabinet of Dr. Caligari (1920), both of which were recommended by Disney to his staff. This influence is particularly evident in the scenes of Snow White fleeing through the forest and the Queen's transformation into the Witch. The latter scene was also inspired by Dr. Jekyll and Mr. Hyde (1931), to which Disney made specific reference in story meetings.

=== Financial issues ===
Disney had to mortgage his house to help finance the film's production, which ran up a total cost of $1,488,422.74 ($34,207,754 in 2025), a massive sum for a feature film in 1937. Midway through, Disney needed a $250,000 loan to finish the film. Disney ran a rough cut for Joseph Rosenberg of Bank of America, who sat impassively during the showing. Then Rosenberg turned to the worried Disney and said, "Walt, that thing is going to make a hatful of money" and approved the loan.

== Release ==
=== Original theatrical run ===
The film's 1937 theatrical trailer

Snow White and the Seven Dwarfs premiered at the Carthay Circle Theatre on December 21, 1937. The film received a standing ovation at its completion from an audience that included Judy Garland, Marlene Dietrich and Charles Laughton. Six days later, Walt Disney and the seven dwarfs appeared on the cover of Time magazine. Three weeks later, it opened at the Radio City Music Hall in New York City and a theater in Miami in January 1938, in which the strong box office sales encouraged RKO Radio Pictures to place the film into general release on February 4. It became a major box-office success, becoming the most successful sound film of all time, in which it displaced Al Jolson's The Singing Fool (1928). Snow White would soon be displaced from this position by Gone with the Wind in December 1939.

Snow White proved equally popular with foreign audiences. It premiered in London on February 24, 1938, ironically the same night as Charles Laughton's first film as a producer, Vessel of Wrath, leading to a poor turnout for the latter. In September 1938, Variety reported that the film was having a remarkably long box-office run at theaters in Sydney, Australia. In that city, it noted, "Walt Disney's 'Snow White' (RKO) experienced no difficulty at hitting 11 weeks, with more ahead." Variety reported as well that Snow White was having even longer runs in other cities overseas, such as in London, where the film had generated greater box-office receipts than during its exclusive New York screenings at Radio City Music Hall:

'Snow White' (RKO) is in its 27th week at the New Gallery, London, and will continue to be shown through the regular London release dates, Sept. 19 for North London, and Sept. 26 for South London. There is a likelihood that the New Gallery first-run will run until Christmas. Picture reported to have exceeded $500,000, passing Radio City's five-week mark, which just fell short of the $500,000 mark.

According to RKO, Snow White and the Seven Dwarfs had earned $7,846,000 in international box office receipts by the end of its original theatrical run. This earned RKO a profit of $380,000.

=== Re-releases ===
Snow White and the Seven Dwarfs was first re-released in 1944, to raise revenue for the Disney studio during the World War II period. This re-release set a tradition of re-releasing Disney animated features every few years, and Snow White and the Seven Dwarfs was re-released to theaters in 1952, 1958, 1967, 1975, 1983, 1987 and 1993. Coinciding with the 50th-anniversary release in 1987, Disney released one of many authorized novelizations of the story, this one written by children's author Suzanne Weyn.

In 1993, Snow White and the Seven Dwarfs became the first film to be entirely scanned to digital files, manipulated, and recorded back to film. The restoration project was carried out entirely at 4K resolution and 10-bit color depth using the Cineon system (10 bits each of red, green and blue—30 in total) to digitally remove dirt and scratches.

Snow White and the Seven Dwarfs has had a lifetime gross of $418 million across its original release and several reissues. Adjusted for inflation, and incorporating subsequent releases, the film remains one of the top-10 American film moneymakers of all time and is the highest-grossing animated film.

As part of Disney's 100th anniversary, the film was re-released in cinemas across the UK on August 4, 2023, for one week.

=== Critical reception ===
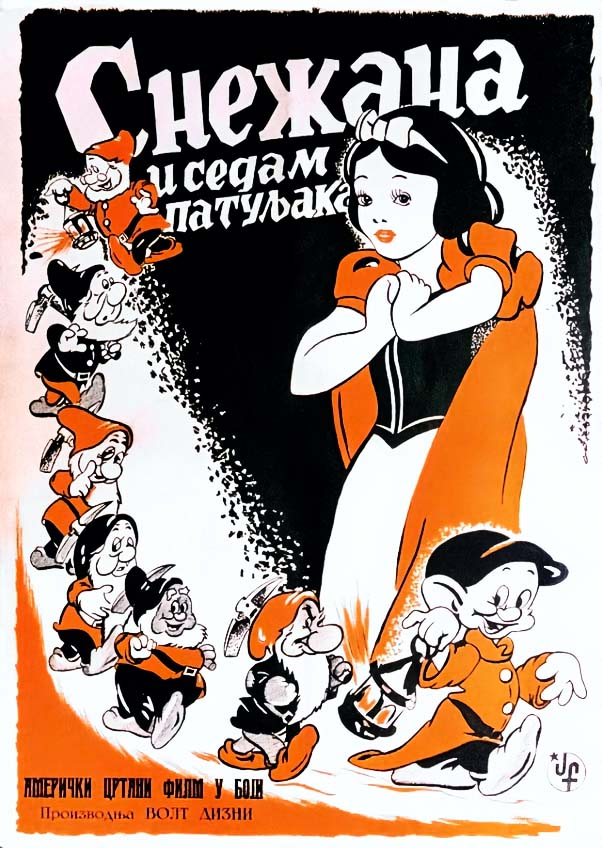
Yugoslav poster, 1938

The film was released to near-unanimous acclaim from film critics, with many reviewers hailing it as a genuine work of art, recommended for both children and adults. Although film histories often state that the animation of the human characters was criticized, more recent scholarship found that contemporary reviewers praised the realistic style of the human animation, with several stating that audiences had forgotten that they were watching animated humans rather than real ones. Frank S. Nugent of The New York Times felt that "Mr. Disney and his technical crew have outdone themselves. The picture more than matches expectations. It is a classic, as importantly cinematically as The Birth of a Nation or the birth of Mickey Mouse. Nothing quite like it has been done before; and already we have gone impolite enough to clamor for an encore." Variety observed that "[so] perfect is the illusion, so tender the romance and fantasy, so emotional are certain portions when the acting of the characters strikes a depth comparable to the sincerity of human players, that the film approaches real greatness." Harrison's Reports wrote Snow White was "entertainment that should be enjoyed by every one. Intelligent adults will marvel at the mechanical ingenuity that went into the making of it; and it is something to marvel at, for at times the characters seem lifelike. That is brought about by the expert synchronization of the action with the music and the dialogue."

At the 11th Academy Awards, the film won an Academy Honorary Award for Walt Disney "as a significant screen innovation which has charmed millions and pioneered a great new entertainment field". Disney received a full-size Oscar statuette and seven miniature ones, presented to him by 10-year-old child actress Shirley Temple. The film was also nominated for Best Musical Score. "Some Day My Prince Will Come" has become a jazz standard that has been performed by numerous artists, including Buddy Rich, Lee Wiley, Oscar Peterson, Frank Churchill, and Oliver Jones; it was also the title for albums by Miles Davis, Wynton Kelly, and Alexis Cole.

Noted filmmakers such as Sergei Eisenstein and Charlie Chaplin praised Snow White and the Seven Dwarfs as a notable achievement in cinema; Eisenstein went so far as to call it the greatest film ever made. The film inspired Metro-Goldwyn-Mayer to produce its own fantasy film, The Wizard of Oz, in 1939.

=== Critical re-evaluation and industry recognition ===
Snow White and the Seven Dwarfs is referred by many critics as one of the greatest animated films in history. Rolling Stone ranked it fourth on its list of the greatest animated films of all time, calling it the one that "changed the future of animation." Time magazine ranked the film as the 13th best animated film of all time. Harper's Bazaar listed the film as the number one animated film of all time, crediting it as the one that started it all. On the review aggregator website Rotten Tomatoes, 97% of 128 critics' reviews are positive, with an average rating of 8.8/10. The website's consensus reads: "With its involving story and characters, vibrant art, and memorable songs, Snow White and the Seven Dwarfs set the animation standard for decades to come." Metacritic, which uses a weighted average, assigned the film a score of 96 out of 100, based on 15 critics, indicating "universal acclaim".

In 1987, Snow White was inducted into the Hollywood Walk of Fame, making her the only Disney Princess to do so.

The American Film Institute (AFI), an independent non-profit organization created in the United States by the National Endowment for the Arts, releases a variety of annual awards and film lists recognizing excellence in filmmaking. The AFI 100 Years... series, which ran from 1998 to 2008, created categorized lists of America's best movies as selected by juries composed from among over 1,500 artists, scholars, critics, and historians. A film's inclusion in one of these lists was based on the film's popularity over time, historical significance and cultural impact. Snow White and the Seven Dwarfs was selected by juries for inclusion on many AFI lists, including the following:

- AFI's 100 Years... 100 Movies – No. 49
- AFI's 100 Years... 100 Movies (10th Anniversary Edition) – No. 34
- AFI's 10 Top 10 – No. 1 animated film
- AFI's 100 Years... 100 Heroes and Villains: The Queen – No. 10 villain
- AFI's 100 Years... 100 Songs: "Someday My Prince Will Come" – No. 19

=== Home media ===
On October 28, 1994, the film was released in the United States for the first time on home video on VHS and LaserDisc as the first release in the Walt Disney Masterpiece Collection. Two versions were available in each format, including a deluxe edition. The deluxe edition contained the film along with several bonus material such as a making-of documentary, an archival interview of Walt Disney, deleted scenes, a hardcover book and lithographs of the original theater posters. By 1995, the film had sold 24 million home video units and grossed $430 million. As of 2002, the film had sold 25.1 million home video units in the United States.

Snow White and the Seven Dwarfs was released on DVD on October 9, 2001, the first in Disney's Platinum Editions, and featured across two discs the digitally restored film, a making-of documentary narrated by Angela Lansbury, an audio commentary by John Canemaker and, via archived audio clips, Walt Disney. That release was also THX certified and included games, a sing-along, and other bonus features. It sold a record 1 million copies in 24 hours. A VHS release followed on November 27, 2001. Both versions were returned to the Disney Vault on January 31, 2002. As of 2001, the film grossed a combined $1.1 billion from box office and home video revenue.

Snow White and the Seven Dwarfs was released on Blu-ray on October 6, 2009, the first of Disney's Diamond Editions, and a new DVD edition was released on November 24, 2009. The Blu-ray release includes a high-definition version of the movie sourced from a new restoration by Lowry Digital, a DVD copy of the film, and several bonus features not included on the 2001 DVD. This set returned to the Disney Vault on April 30, 2011.

Walt Disney Studios Home Entertainment re-released Snow White and the Seven Dwarfs on Blu-ray and DVD on February 2, 2016, as the first of the Walt Disney Signature Collection line. It was released on Digital HD on January 19, 2016, with bonus material.

In 2023, in celebration of the 100th anniversary of The Walt Disney Company, a new 4K restoration of the film was produced and released on 4K Ultra HD Blu-ray on October 10 as part of the Disney100 promotion, making it the oldest feature-length animated film ever to be released in the format. The new remaster was scanned from the original 35mm Technicolor negative through a multi-year effort by Disney's Restoration and Preservation team and key members of Walt Disney Animation Studios, including Eric Goldberg, Michael Giaimo, Dorothy McKim, and Bob Bagley, all of whom also worked on the 4K remaster of Cinderella (1950). On the process, Goldberg remarked "The opportunity to help restore Snow White was both an honor and a challenge ... we owed a debt to history to get it looking as beautiful and as accurate to the original colors as we could." This version also began streaming on Disney+ on October 16, 2023.

== Legacy ==
Following the film's release, a number of Snow White themed merchandise were sold, including hats, dolls, garden seeds, and glasses. The film's merchandise generated sales of $8 million, equivalent to over $100 million adjusted for inflation. The film's intellectual property has been franchised across a diverse range of mediums, including a Broadway musical, video games, and theme park rides.

Snow White's success led to Disney moving ahead with more feature-film productions. Walt Disney used much of the profits from Snow White and the Seven Dwarfs to finance a new $4.5 million studio in Burbank – the site of Walt Disney Studios to this day. Within two years, the studio completed Pinocchio and Fantasia and had begun production on features such as Dumbo, Bambi, Alice in Wonderland and Peter Pan.

As of March 2025, it is the oldest film to have joined the "One Million Watched Club" on Letterboxd, surpassing previous record-holder The Wizard of Oz.

The film's copyright was renewed in 1965, and as a published work from 1937, it will enter the American public domain on January 1, 2033.

=== Comics adaptations ===
The Silly Symphony Sunday comic strip ran a four-month-long adaptation of Snow White and the Seven Dwarfs from December 12, 1937, to April 24, 1938. The comic was written by Merrill De Maris, and drawn by Hank Porter and Bob Grant. This adaptation was republished several times as a comic book, most recently in 1995.

Mondadori, the official Italian publisher of Disney comics, produced several comic book sequels of the 1937 film. The first story was published in 1939.

=== Theme parks ===
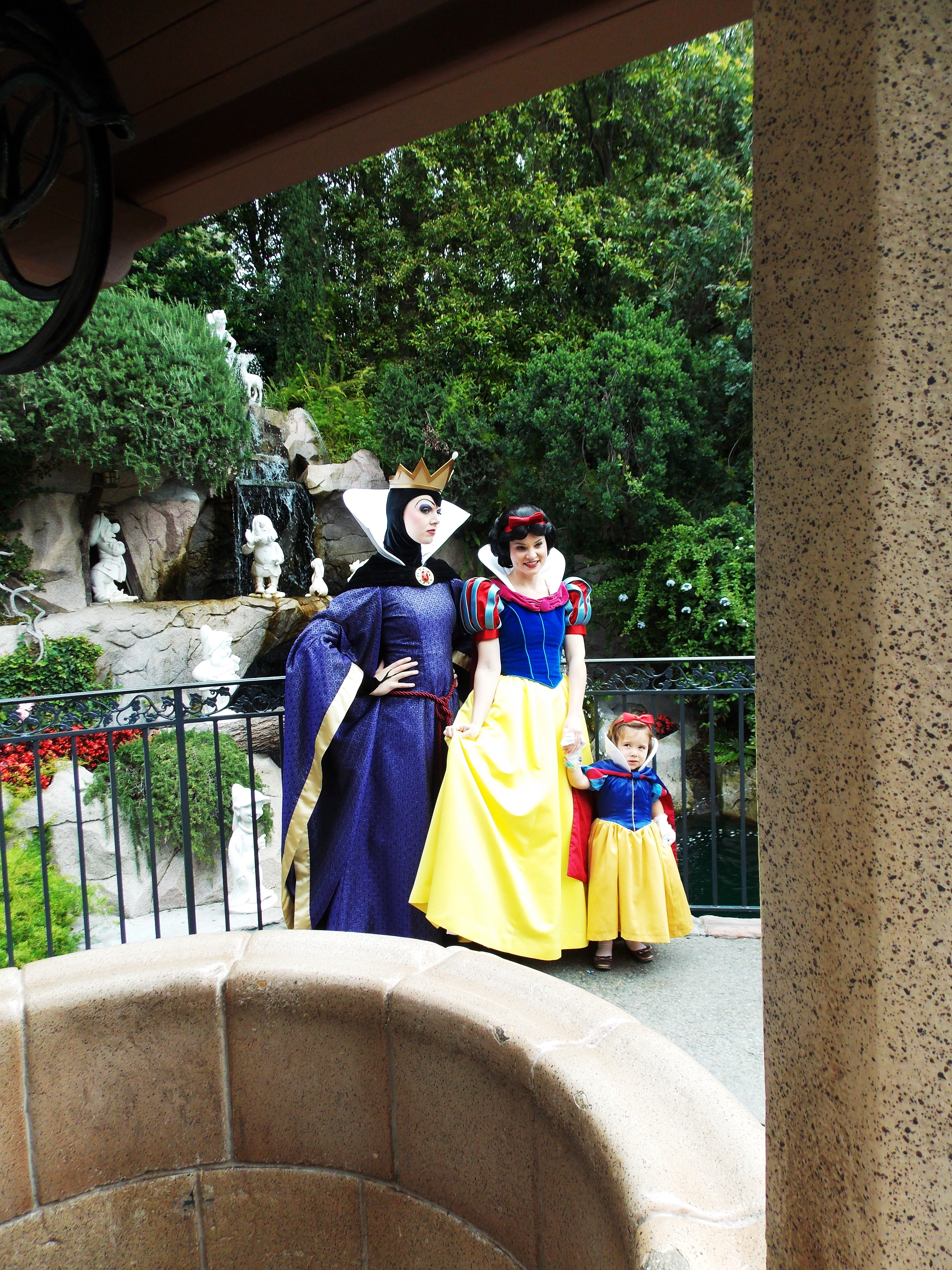
At Disneyland, Snow White and the Evil Queen take a photo with a visitor in 2012

Snow White's Enchanted Wish (named Snow White's Scary Adventures until 2020) is a popular theme park ride at Disneyland (an opening day attraction dating from 1955), Tokyo Disneyland, and Disneyland Paris. Fantasyland at Walt Disney World's Magic Kingdom underwent an expansion from 2012 to 2014. The Snow White's Scary Adventures ride was replaced with Princess Fairytale Hall, where Snow White and other princesses are located for a meet and greet. Included in the 2013 expansion of Fantasyland is the Seven Dwarfs Mine Train roller coaster.

=== Video games ===
Walt Disney's Snow White and the Seven Dwarfs was released for the Game Boy Color system in 2001. Snow White also makes an appearance in the PlayStation 2 game Kingdom Hearts as one of the seven fabled Princesses of Heart. A world based on the film, Dwarf Woodlands, appears in Kingdom Hearts: Birth by Sleep for the PSP. In 2013's free-to-play mobile game Snow White: Queen's Return (also known as Seven Dwarfs: The Queen's Return), a non-canon continuation of the film, the Queen has survived the fall at the climax of the film and then reverted to her youthful form to cast a curse on Snow White and the dwarfs and their entire forest. The world builder video game Disney Magic Kingdoms includes Snow White, all seven dwarfs, the Queen and Prince Charming as playable characters, as well as attractions such as Magic Mirror on the Wall, Seven Dwarfs' Cottage, Seven Dwarfs Mine Train, and Snow White's Scary Adventures.

=== Radio City Music Hall Stage musical ===
Snow White and the Seven Dwarfs was the first Disney-produced musical on the New York stage. Unknown Mary Jo Salerno played Snow White in the Disney-produced Snow White and the Seven Dwarfs (televised as Snow White Live!) at the Radio City Music Hall. Music and lyrics for four new songs were created by Jay Blackton and Joe Cook, respectively; titles included "Welcome to the Kingdom of Once Upon a Time" and "Will I Ever See Her Again?". It ran from October 18 to November 18, 1979, and January 11 to March 9, 1980, a total of 106 performances. A cast album was issued by Buena Vista Records.

=== Canceled prequel ===
In the 2000s, DisneyToon Studios began development on a computer-animated prequel to Snow White and the Seven Dwarfs, titled The Seven Dwarfs. Director Mike Disa and screenwriter Evan Spiliotopoulos pitched a story explaining how the Dwarfs met, and how the Evil Queen killed Snow White's father and took the throne. According to Disa, DisneyToon management changed the prequel's plot to center around how Dopey lost his voice upon witnessing the death of his mother. After Disney purchased Pixar in 2006, John Lasseter, DisneyToons' new Chief Creative Officer, canceled The Seven Dwarfs.

=== Exhibition ===
A behind-the-scenes exhibition titled Snow White and the Seven Dwarfs: The Creation of a Classic took place at The Walt Disney Family Museum from November 15, 2012, to April 14, 2013. The event celebrated the film's 75th anniversary by displaying more than 200 pieces of rare concept art and animation. It also detailed the entire story of the film's production, its release and the worldwide recognition it has earned through the years. Two extensive companion books, The Fairest One of All: The Making of Walt Disney's Snow White and the Seven Dwarfs and Snow White and the Seven Dwarfs: The Art and Creation of Walt Disney's Classic Animated Film were written by J.B. Kaufman and published by Weldon Owen on October 16, 2012.

=== Live-action adaptation ===
An live action movie was released on March 21, 2025. Directed by Marc Webb and written by Erin Cressida Wilson and Greta Gerwig with new music by Benj Pasek and Justin Paul, it stars Rachel Zegler as Snow White, Gal Gadot as the Evil Queen, Andrew Burnap as Jonathan and Martin Klebba, Jeremy Swift, George Salazar, Andy Grotelueschen, Tituss Burgess, Jason Kravits and Andrew Barth Feldman as the Seven Dwarfs: Grumpy, Doc, Happy, Sleepy, Bashful, Sneezy and Dopey, with Patrick Page as the Magic Mirror.

=== Other appearances ===
The Seven Dwarfs made several appearances in shorts, and despite their popularity they were too numerous to animate efficiently. Commissioned shorts The Standard Parade (1939), The Seven Wise Dwarfs (1941, using mostly recycled footage), All Together (1942) and The Winged Scourge (1943) all include appearances.

The 1984 film Gremlins featured the cartoon in the theater scenes. At the end of the 2022 Marvel Cinematic Universe film Doctor Strange in the Multiverse of Madness, Wanda Maximoff's sons can be seen watching Snow White and the Seven Dwarfs on the television in the living room. A clip of the Queen as the Witch appears in the credits sequence of the 2024 MCU television series Agatha All Along.

== See also ==
- List of animated feature-length films
- List of Disney animated features
- List of Disney animated films based on fairy tales
- List of films about witchcraft

== Sources ==
- Barrier, Michael (1999). Hollywood Cartoons: American Animation in Its Golden Age. Oxford University Press. ISBN 978-0-1980-2079-0.
- Behlmer, Rudy (1982). America's Favorite Movies: Behind the Scenes. Frederick Ungar Publishing Company. ISBN 978-0-8044-2036-5.
- Canemaker, John (1996). Before the Animation Begins: The Life and Times of Disney Inspirational Sketch Artists. New York: Hyperion. ISBN 0-7868-6152-5.
- Canemaker, John (2001). Walt Disney's Nine Old Men and the Art of Animation. Disney Editions. ISBN 978-0-7868-6496-6.
- Dakin, Glenn; Saxon, Victoria (2020). Disney Villains The Essential Guide New Edition. DK Publishing. ISBN 978-0-7440-3483-7.
- Finch, Christopher (2004). The Art of Walt Disney: From Mickey Mouse to the Magic Kingdoms. New York: H.N. Abrams. ISBN 978-0-8109-4964-5.
- Gabler, Neal (2006). Walt Disney: The Triumph of the American Imagination. Vintage Books. ISBN 978-0-6797-5747-4.
- Ghez, Didier (2016). They Drew As they Pleased: The Hidden Art of Disney's Golden Age. Chronicle Books LLC. ISBN 978-1-4521-5860-0.
- Holliss, Richard; Sibley, Brian (1994). Snow White and the Seven Dwarfs & the Making of the Classic Film. Hyperion. ISBN 978-0-7868-6133-0.
- Kaufman, J. B. (2012b). The Fairest One of All: The Making of Walt Disney's Snow White and the Seven Dwarfs. Weldon Owen. ISBN 978-1-61628-438-1.
- Maltin, Leonard (1995). The Disney Films. Disney Editions. ISBN 978-0-7868-8527-5.
- Scott, Kevin (2022). Cartoon Voices of the Golden Age, 1930-70 Vol. 1. BearManor Media. ISBN 979-8-88-771008-2.
- Thomas, Bob (1991). Disney's Art of Animation: From Mickey Mouse to Beauty and the Beast. New York: Hyperion. ISBN 1-56282-899-1.
- Thomas, Bob (1994). Walt Disney: An American Original. Hyperion Press. ISBN 0-7868-6027-8.
- Thomas, Bob (1997). Disney's Art of Animation: From Mickey Mouse To Hercules. Disney Editions. ISBN 978-0-7868-6241-2.
- Thomas, Frank; Johnston, Ollie (1993). The Disney Villain. Disney Editions. ISBN 978-1-5628-2792-2.
- Thomas, Frank; Johnston, Ollie (1981). The Illusion of Life: Disney Animation. New York: Hyperion. ISBN 0-7868-6070-7.
