= Donald W. Graham =

Canadian-American artist and educator (1903–1976)

Donald W. Graham (June 17, 1903 – October 19, 1976) was a Canadian-American fine artist and art instructor. An early graduate and later a professor at the Chouinard Art Institute (later merged into the California Institute of the Arts), Graham is best known as the head of the internal training and orientation classes at Walt Disney Productions from 1932 to 1940.

Assisted by Disney's top animators, Graham helped to document and establish many of the principles that make up the foundation of the art of traditional animation. He posthumously received the Winsor McCay Award for lifetime achievement in the animation field from ASIFA-Hollywood in 1982.

Don Graham really knew what he was teaching, and he "showed" you how to do something – he didn't just talk. He taught us things that were very important for animation. How to simplify our drawings – how to cut out all the unnecessary hen scratching amateurs have a habit of using. He showed us how to make a drawing look solid. He taught us about tension points – like a bent knee, and how the pant leg comes down from that knee and how important the wrinkles from it are to describe form. I learned a hell of a lot from him!

— Art Babbitt, Once Upon a Time — Walt Disney: The Sources of inspiration for the Disney Studios
