= Thelma Boardman =

American actress

- Born: Thelma Joyce Hubbard; October 31, 1909; Panama Canal Zone
- Died: April 21, 1978 (aged 68); Los Angeles, California, U.S.
- Occupations: Voice actress, writer
- Years active: 1937–1971
- Spouses: Russell Erwin Diehl (m. 1929; div. 19??); True Eames Boardman (m. 1935)
- Children: 2

Thelma Boardman (born Thelma Joyce Hubbard, October 31, 1909 – April 21, 1978) was an American voice actress and writer best known for her work with the Walt Disney Studios, particularly as the voice actress for Minnie Mouse from 1937 to 1938 and from 1941 to 1942.

== Biography ==
Thelma Joyce Hubbard was born in the Panama Canal Zone on October 31, 1909, to Edward Lucius and Rebecca Cecelia (née Delevante) Hubbard. She married Russell Erwin Diehl on July 7, 1929, before marrying True Boardman, with whom she had two children. She began voicing Minnie Mouse as part of the radio show The Mickey Mouse Theater of the Air in 1937 and made her film debut in 1938 as Donald's Angel in Donald's Better Self. She died on April 21, 1978, in Los Angeles, California.

In 1932, she was campaign manager for her father when he sought nomination to be a Democratic candidate for Congress from California.

== Selected filmography ==
=== As an actress ===
- Donald's Better Self (1938)
- Mother Goose Goes Hollywood (1938)
- Snow White and the Seven Dwarfs (Dubbing to Spanish, 1938) as Snow White
- Mickey's Birthday Party (1942)
- Out of the Frying Pan into the Firing Line (1942)
- Bambi (1942)

=== As a writer ===
- Ethel Barrymore Theater (1956)
- Gunsmoke (1971)

Preceded by Marcellite Garner	Voice of Minnie Mouse; 1941–1942	Succeeded by Ruth Clifford
