= Retta Scott =

American artist

- Born: February 23, 1916; Omak, Washington, U.S.
- Died: August 26, 1990 (aged 74); Foster City, California, U.S.
- Known for: Animation
- Spouse: Benjamin Worcester
- Awards: Disney Legend

Retta Scott (February 23, 1916 – August 26, 1990) was an American animator, artist and illustrator. She was the first woman to receive screen credit as an animator at the Walt Disney Animation Studios, for her work on Bambi. Scott's ground breaking work in drawing realistic animals impressed animators at the studio and Walt Disney himself which led to her promotion.

Scott is recognised as a pioneering female figure during the golden age of American animation. She was inducted as a Disney Legend in 2000.

== Early life and education ==
Scott was born in Omak, Washington on February 23, 1916. She graduated from Seattle's Roosevelt High School in 1934. Scott received two scholarships over the course of her education. The first was from the Seattle Art & Music Foundation, who awarded her with a scholarship in the 4th grade that she used to attend 10 years of creative art classes. She later received 3-year scholarship to attend the Chouinard Art Institute, so she moved to Los Angeles, California. She spent much of her free time sketching wildlife at the nearby Griffith Park zoo. Her ambition was to mold a career in Fine arts.

As her time at the Chouinard Art Institute ended, its director, Vern Caldwell, urged Scott to apply for work with Walt Disney, based on her passion for animals. She was initially uninterested due to the cartoon shorts the company was known for, but Caldwell recommended her to work on Bambi, a full film which was in production. She eventually joined the company in 1938 to work in the Story Department.

According to Country Life, the Seattle Art Museum showcased Scott's paintings as part of a 1940 exhibit.

== Career at Disney ==
Scott worked on storyboards to develop scenes of Bambi, his mother, and the film's hunting dogs, on which she spent weeks to develop them into “vicious, snarling, really mean beasts.” Male artists in the company were stunned, who initially assumed that only a man could create drawings with such intensity and technical skill. Her sketches caught the eye of Disney, so when the film went into production she was assigned to animate scenes of hunting dogs chasing Faline. She worked under the film's supervising director, David D. Hand, and was tutored by Disney animator Eric Larson. This was a significant coup for the young woman, since at the 1930s-era Disney studio, women were considered only for routine tasks: "Ink and paint art was a laborious part of the animation process, and was solely the domain of women..." Her promotion to animator was in part thanks to the success of herself and other women such as Bianca Majolie, Sylvia Holland, and Mary Blair as storyboard artists. Even after receiving a promotion to animator, she and her animations continued being under appreciated in the industry. Though the most recognized Walt Disney female artist is Mary Blair, Scott opened up doors for women in the animation industry before Blair. She became the first woman to receive screen credit as a Disney animator; Lillian Friedman, an animator at Disney's New York rival Fleischer Studios, had become the first woman to receive screen credit as an animator on an American animated production in 1934. By the spring of 1941, Scott was also considered a "specialist in animal sketches."

Scott worked as an animator Fantasia (1940) and Dumbo (1941), as well as an adaptation of The Wind in the Willows that was later truncated into the first half of The Adventures of Ichabod and Mr. Toad (1949). She also made an appearance in The Reluctant Dragon, and worked independently with Disney colleague Woolie Reitherman on a cancelled children's book called B-1st. Despite being laid off in 1941, Scott was quickly rehired in 1942, assisting in educational videos and other smaller-scale shorts. Her brief time laid off was partially due to a Disney animators' strike in the summer of 1941, despite Scott being one of only a few animators not involved in the strike. She retired on August 2, 1946, after marrying submarine commander Benjamin Worcester, becoming Retta Scott Worcester.

In 2000, the Walt Disney Co. posthumously awarded her one of that year's Disney Legends Awards for her contributions. Scott's early Disney sketches can be found at the Walt Disney Family Museum in San Francisco, California.

== Later work ==
Scott and her husband moved to Washington, D.C., where she illustrated books such as The Santa Claus Book and Happy Birthday. She also continued working with Disney through freelance jobs such as illustrating the Big Golden Book edition of Disney's Cinderella. Her work caught the attention of past and current Disney employees, including Jonas Rivera, producer of Up, who commented, "I've always loved the Retta Scott Cinderella because it doesn't look like the movie, but somehow it feels like the movie." Retta and her husband divorced in 1978, and she remained an active illustrator until she was again hired as an animator in 1982 for the Luckey-Zamora Moving Picture Company. She continued to impress artists, especially male artists who initially underestimated her work, and was eager to teach her skills.

Scott suffered a stroke in December 1985 and died on August 26, 1990, at her home in Foster City, California.

== Filmography ==
Year	Title	Notes
1940	Pinocchio	Assistant animator - uncredited
1940	Fantasia	Animator - uncredited
1941	The Reluctant Dragon	Studio artist - uncredited
1941	Dumbo	Animator – uncredited
1942	Donald's Snow Fight	Animator - uncredited
1942	Donald Gets Drafted	Animator – uncredited
1942	Donald's Decision	Animator - uncredited
1942	Bambi	Animator
1943	The Grain That Built a Hemisphere	Animator - uncredited
1945	Tuberculosis	Animator, background artist
1945	-- (Goofy cartoon, no title)	Animator
1946	The Story of Menstruation	Animator - uncredited
1949	The Adventures of Ichabod and Mr Toad	Animator - uncredited
1982	The Plague Dogs	Animator
