= List of collectables =

This is a list of popular collectables.

== Advertising ==
- Match-related items
- Premiums
  - Radio premiums
- Prizes
  - Bazooka Joe comics from Bazooka bubble gum
  - Cereal box prizes
    - Crater Critters
  - Cracker Jack prizes
  - Pin-back buttons

== Brands ==
- Beanie Babies
- Coca-Cola
- Disneyana
  - Disney pin trading
- Steiff teddy bears
- Swarovski figurines
- Zippo lighters

== Books and periodicals ==
- Books
- Comic books

== Cards ==
- Artist trading cards
- Collectible card games
- Playing cards
- Gift cards
- Phone cards
- Trading cards
  - Insert cards
  - Non-sports trading cards
  - For sports cards, see #Sports

== Clothing and accessories, fabric and textiles ==
- Buttons
- Handbags
- Patches (also badges)
- Sneakers

== Coins, currency, and stamps ==
- Numismatics
  - Coins
  - Paper currency and banknotes
- Stamps
  - First day covers
  - Postmarks
- Stock and bond certificates

== Ephemera ==
Ephemera are transitory written and printed matter not intended to be retained or preserved.

- Autographs
- Film posters
- Cheese labels

== Film and television ==
- Film memorabilia
  - Film posters

== Memorabilia ==
- Militaria, military items
- Murderabilia, collectibles related to murders, homicides, the perpetrators or other violent crimes
- Nazi memorabilia
- Police memorabilia
- Scouting memorabilia

== Music ==
- Vintage guitars
- Records

== Nature ==
- Insects, including butterflies
- Seashells
- Chemical elements
- Eggs
- Fossils
- Minerals
- Plants
- Rocks

== Sports ==
- Sports memorabilia
  - Baseballs
  - Sports cards
    - Baseball cards
    - Basketball cards
    - Football cards
    - Hockey cards
    - Jersey cards
  - Stickers

== Toys, games, and dolls ==
- Antique toys
- Barbie dolls
- Beanie Babies
- Bobbleheads
- Casino chips
- Collectible card games
- Pez dispensers
- Toy soldiers
- Toy trains
- Die cast cars and other die cast vehicles
- Model airplanes
- LEGO (discontinued sets)

== Transportation ==
- Automobilia
  - Classic cars
  - Vintage cars
- Bicycles
- Railroadiana, collectibles associated with railroads
- Petroliana, collectibles associated with the petroleum industry
- Transport tickets.

== Other ==
- Antiques
- Breweriana, objects associated with breweries
  - Beer cans
- Knives
- Enamel pins, also called lapel pins
- Vexillophilia, collecting of flags, standards and ensigns
- Victoriana, collecting of materials from the Victorian era
