= Disneyland social club =

Organized group of Disneyland fans

A Disneyland social club is an organized group of Disneyland fans who express participation in their chosen club by wearing matching jackets or vests bearing back patch designs that are reminiscent of motorcycle clubs. Disneyland social clubs are not considered actual gangs.

== Identifying traits ==
Each club has membership requirements and guidelines and is required to follow Disney's park rules, including the requirement to co-operate with the Disney cast members and to be respectful to all park visitors. Some clubs are named after popular Disneyland rides, such as the "Hitchhikers" (named after the hitchhiking ghosts of the Haunted Mansion) and "The Jungle Cruisers" (named after the Jungle Cruise attraction). Other Disneyland social clubs have more generic names, such as "The Hidden Mickeys", "Walt's Misfits", and "Main Street Elite" (the largest and most visible club).

Each Disneyland social club has its own leather jacket, jean jacket, varsity letterman jacket, or vest which bears custom-made patches of its mascot, logo, and unique club name. Jacket/vest fronts often feature the member's name and favorite character or attraction, with Disney trading pins.

Group members wearing patches created a style, and other groups quickly copied. Subsequently, the number of patched Disneyland social clubs grew. By March 2014, there were over 20 social clubs in existence. Coincidentally, in July 2013, the Disney Channel premiered a Disney Channel Original Movie entitled Teen Beach Movie which featured a group of motorcycle bikers calling themselves "The Rodents Social Club" who wore matching motorcycle jackets emblazoned with their club's name and a picture of a mouse.

The Los Angeles Times has described social clubs as "harmless alliances of friends and family who meet up at the park to share a nerdy obsession for all things Disney". The OC Weekly called the clubs a "new generation of hardcore Disney fans".

== History ==
The Neverlanders, founded in October 2012, are believed to be the first patched social club to wear jackets/vests bearing back patches. The Neverlanders is a group of over 30 members ranging from ages 2 to 63. There was an earlier Disneyland social club formed in 2012, named "The Black Death Crew", which began on March 29, 2012, as a group of friends wearing all-black clothing to Disneyland in Anaheim, California. However, they did not have matching back patches. They were followed by The Hitchhikers, which was founded in February 2013, and The Main Street Elite, which was founded in early 2013.

By April 2013, the first known reference to Disneyland social club appeared in an Internet forum post called MiceChat.com (an online website centered around discussions about Disneyland trips and visits). By the end of 2017, there were more than 100 Disney social clubs founded by Disney Park fans.

== Controversy ==
On September 11, 2017, John Sarno, a member of a Disney Social club filed a lawsuit in Orange County Superior Court claiming he was bullied and terrorized by members of the "White Rabbits Social Club." Sarno accused White Rabbits members of cyberbullying, defamation, invasion of medical privacy, infliction of emotional distress, and alleged that their conduct caused his wife Leslee Sarno to lose her job.

The lawsuit claimed that John and Leslee Sarno organized a September 11 memorial walk in 2016, and that one week before the event, Jakob Fite and four members of the "White Rabbits Social Club" approached him and demanded "$500 in protection money". Sarno refused to pay the money, and claimed that Fite and others subsequently cyberbullied him by creating malicious rumors on podcasts and social media frequented by other Disneyland social clubs.

Sarno's lawsuit also alleged that Fite attempted to make him and his wife appear to be drug addicts by hacking into confidential medical files and publishing the medications that were prescribed to them, which violated their medical confidentiality rights pursuant to HIPAA. Sarno named Kaiser Foundation Health Plan as a defendant in the lawsuit, claiming that Kaiser failed to protect his medical information. Sarno also named Disneyland as a defendant in the lawsuit, because it took “no steps to stop the 'White Rabbits’ malicious conduct”. As a result of this dispute, John Sarno disbanded his social club and shut down its website. Following the lawsuit, Disneyland declined to permit further memorial walks.

== See also ==
- Dapper Day
- D23-Official Disney fan club
- Disney adults
- Disneyana
