= Disney adult =

Adult fan of the Walt Disney Company

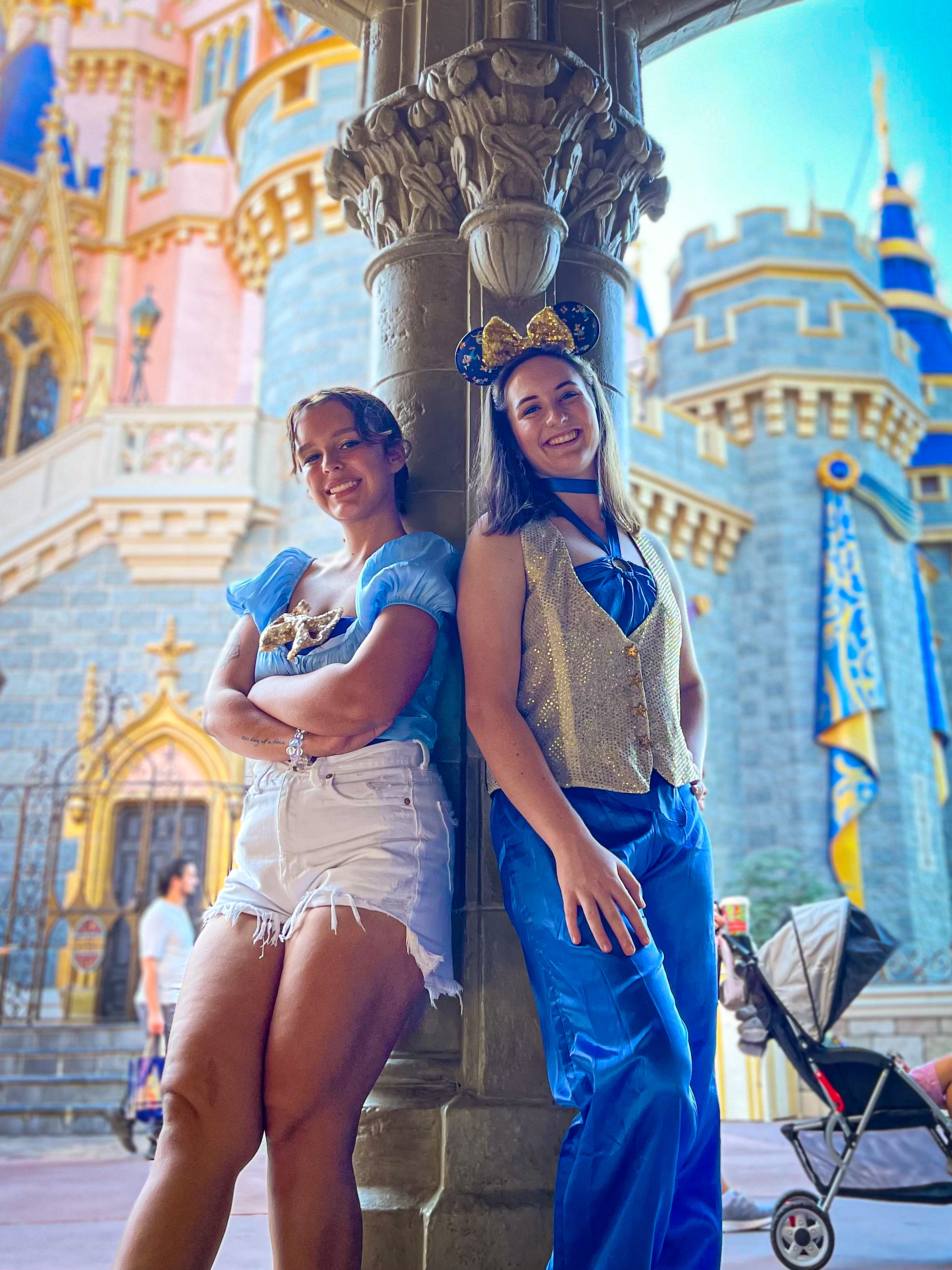
Two women posing at Cinderella Castle in 2021 during Walt Disney World's 50th anniversary, both dressed in the event's blue and gold color scheme

A Disney adult is an adult who is an avid fan of the works of The Walt Disney Company. Common hobbies of Disney adults include visiting Disney theme parks, collecting Disney merchandise, cosplaying Disney characters, and watching videos on the Disney+ streaming service.

Some people, including influencers and celebrities, proudly identify as Disney adults. BuzzFeed News describes the phenomenon as a "polarizing fandom" that has received scrutiny and ridicule from others.

== Origin and history ==
Practices associated with the phenomenon, such as Disney weddings, date to at least the 1990s. Walt Disney World advertising from the era promised adults "A World of Magic Without the Kids!"

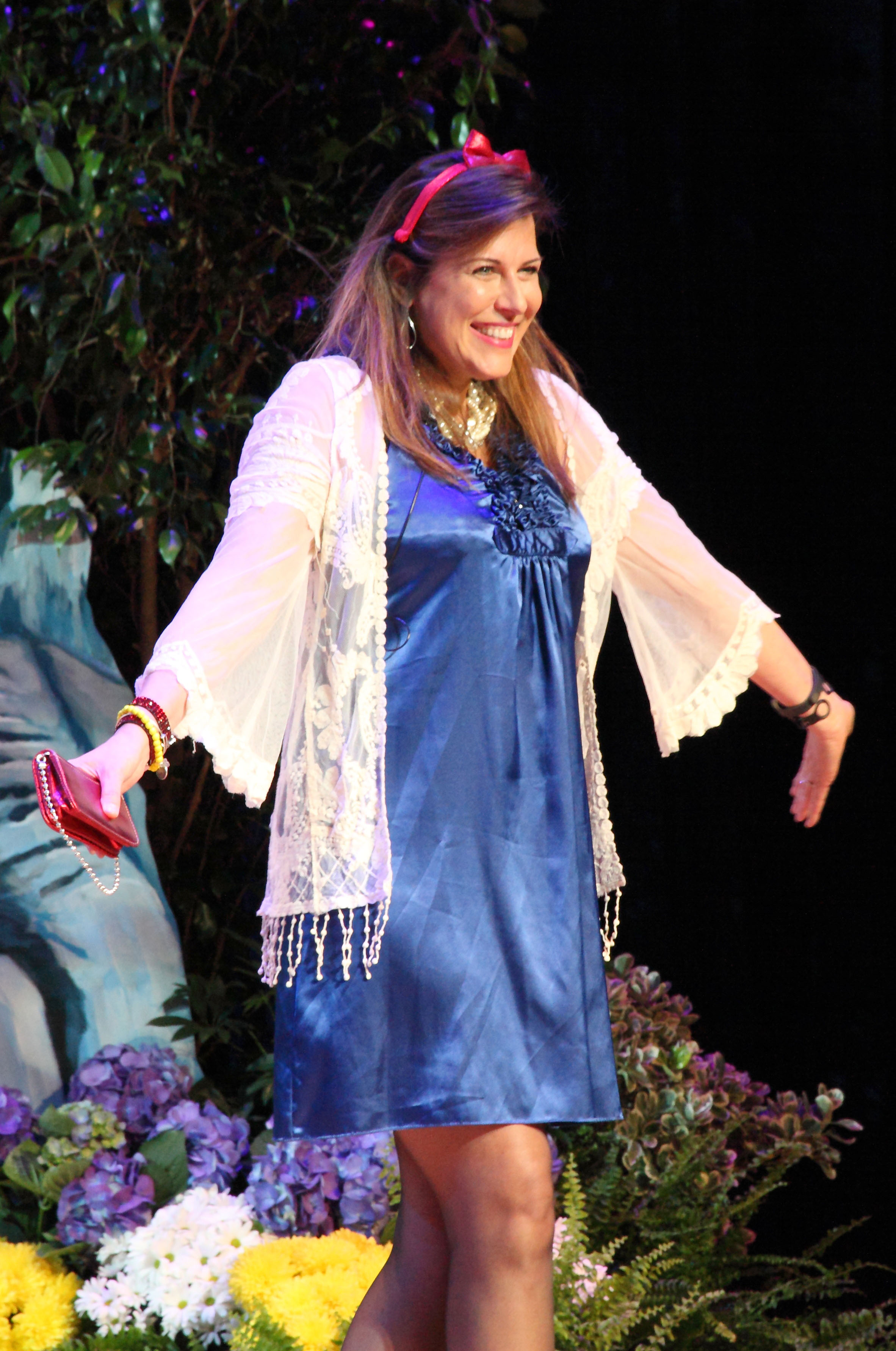
A woman dressing in the style of Snow White, at the Disneyland Hotel in 2014

Amanda Brennan, former head of editorial at Tumblr, identifies that website as the origin of the Disney adult fandom, specifically the practice of "DisneyBounding", a type of informal cosplay where adult visitors dress in the color palette of their favorite Disney character. She sees the millennial generation as having more "freedom to follow their own obsessions", due to it being more socially acceptable for them to have juvenile interests.

In 2019, a Facebook post went viral in which a parent complained about childless millennial couples obstructing her family's experience at Disney World. This post then turned into a meme that was widely shared on social media, making fun of Disney adults, specifically millennials in their 30s who did not have any children and were still going to the parks often.

Disney adults are sometimes seen by others as embarrassing or naive for enjoying material ostensibly aimed at children, with sociologist Idil Galip saying that the financial and emotional investment in maintaining the commercialized hobby "almost signals a break from regular society or real life", while Canadian scholar Henry Giroux argues that the escapism actively sought by these adults through consumption of media they know to be directly connected to the Walt Disney conglomerate is a product of the company's intentional and careful design by commercializing any previous emotional attachments to its properties, which in turn leads to an infantilization of the audience's self that reduces their sense of agency.

== Demographics ==
A January 2024 survey of self-identified Disney adults found that 71% were aged between 25 and 44, 80% were female, 84% lived in North America, and 88% were white. 91% expected to remain a "Disney adult" for the rest of their lives.

== Notable Disney adults ==
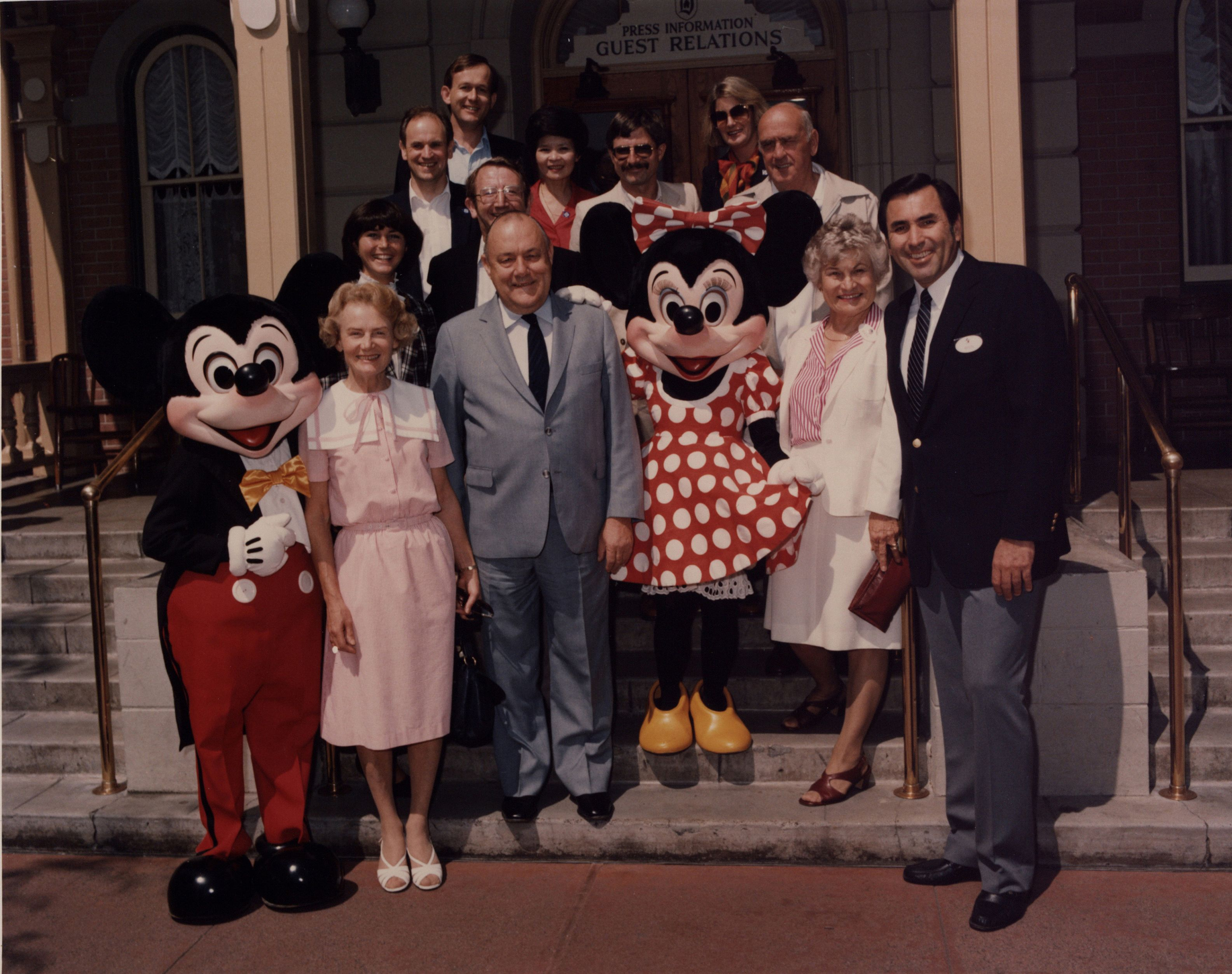
New Zealand Prime Minister Robert Muldoon on a trip to Disneyland, November 1977

Various celebrities have acknowledged being Disney fans, including:

- Robert Muldoon: the former prime minister of New Zealand, was known for his eccentric behavior, including an affection to Mickey Mouse, and travelled to Disneyland during his premiership. His Disney fandom was said to contrast with his reactionary, aggressive and abrasive personality of a right-wing populist and economic nationalist politician.
- John Stamos: The actor proposed to his wife Caitlin McHugh at Disneyland and celebrated their first anniversary at the park, also collects Disney Parks memorabilia.
- Holly Madison: The television personality married at Disneyland and named her home library the "'Beauty and the Beast' library".
- Katy Perry: The singer presented the unveiling of Minnie Mouse's star on the Hollywood Walk of Fame and has cosplayed as Disney characters for American Idol's Disney Week.
- Mariah Carey: The singer renewed her wedding vows with then-husband Nick Cannon on their 5th anniversary at Disneyland, and serves as the godmother for Disney Cruise Line's Fantasy ship.
- Ariana Grande: The singer, a Florida native, celebrated her 21st birthday at Walt Disney World.
- Jennette McCurdy: The actress explicitly stated that she is a Disney adult in a YouTube short-form interview.
- Chris Evans: The actor stated he is a "big, big, big Disney fan" and that Walt Disney World is his "idea of heaven". According to the actor, "no trip is complete without a ride on Space Mountain and a Mickey ice cream bar".
- Jason Bateman: The actor has repeatedly visited Disneyland since he moved to Los Angeles in the 1970s, and described his voice acting work on Disney Animation's 2016 film Zootopia as "a really big, big call for me".
- A Twink and a Redhead: The comedic musical duo have professed their love for Disney to Rolling Stone, as well as on their single "Disney Adult". According to Grant Gibbs, his entire YouTube homepage is "all just Disney vloggers".

== See also ==
- D23 – Official Disney fan club
- Dapper Day – Unofficial biannual event at Disneyland
- Disneyana – Walt Disney Company ephemera
- Disneyland social club – Organized group of Disneyland fans
- Donaldism – Disney comics fandom
- Mouse Mingle
- Peter Pan syndrome
