= Sports memorabilia =

Collectables associated with sports

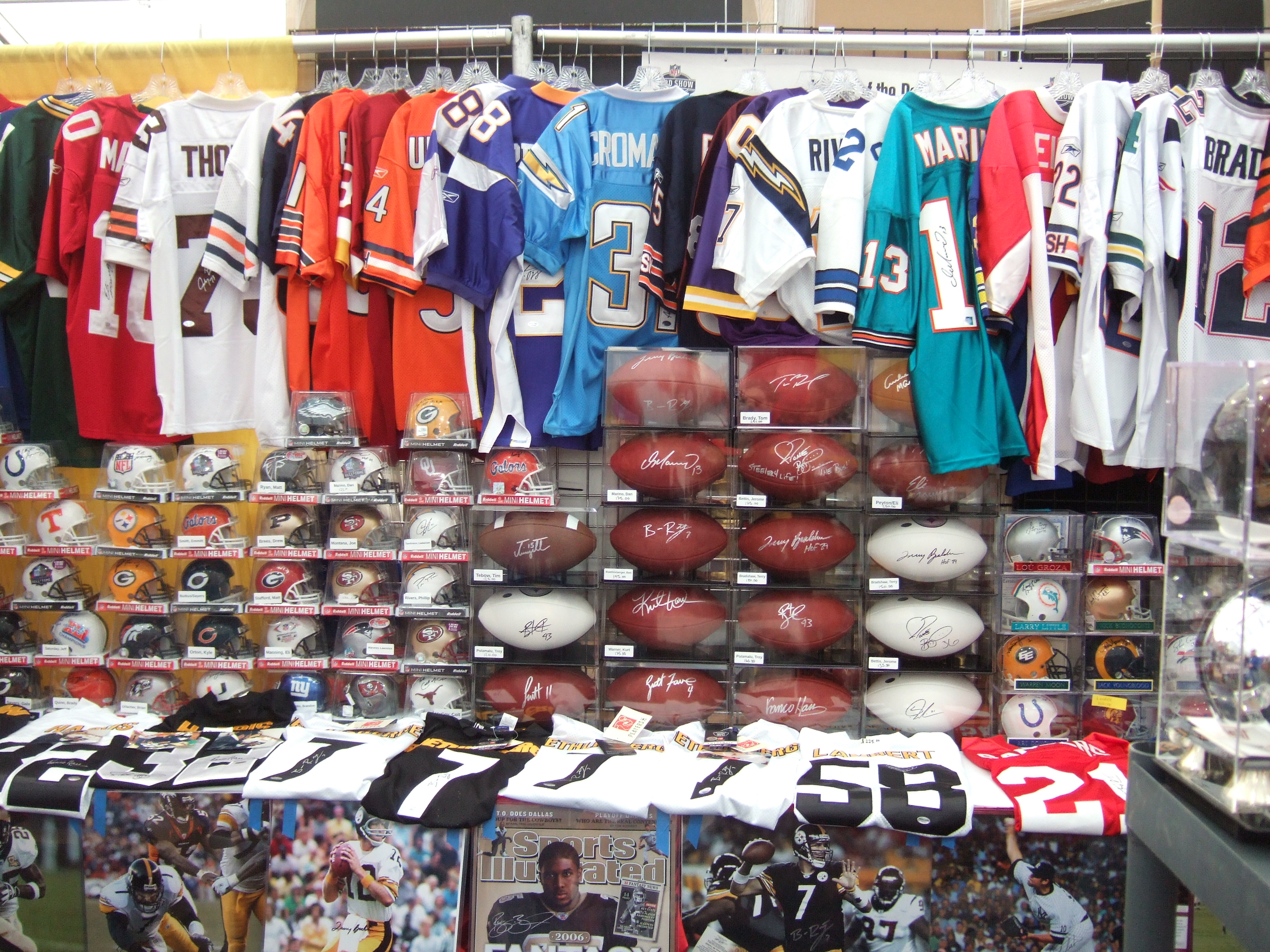
A collection of autographed American football memorabilia

Sports memorabilia is collectables associated with sports, including equipment, trophies, sports cards, autographs, and photographs. A multi-billion-dollar industry has grown around the trading of sports memorabilia.

== Monetary value ==
Items that have been in direct contact with a famous athlete can have significant monetary value. Game-used items, such as a ball Mark McGwire hit for his 70th home run of the 1998 season, sold for $3 million. The most expensive piece of sports memorabilia ever sold was a New York Yankees baseball jersey worn by Babe Ruth during his 'called shot' game in the 1932 World Series. It sold for $24.12 million in 2024. In 2016, the ten most valuable sports cards and memorabilia sold for a record-setting combined $12,186,294. The highest price fetched for an association football shirt is $224,000. The shirt belonged to Pelé, who wore it during the 1970 World Cup final in which Brazil went on to win. Collectors of sports memorabilia may seek to authenticate items to prove their veracity. Autographed items are nearly always more valuable than non-autographed items. In May 2026, a match-worn and signed jersey worn by Lamine Yamal during a UEFA Champions League match between FC Barcelona and Newcastle United was auctioned for US$86,980.. Sports memorabilia items are considered good investments by collectors, as the industry and prices of items grow rapidly.

== Popular items ==
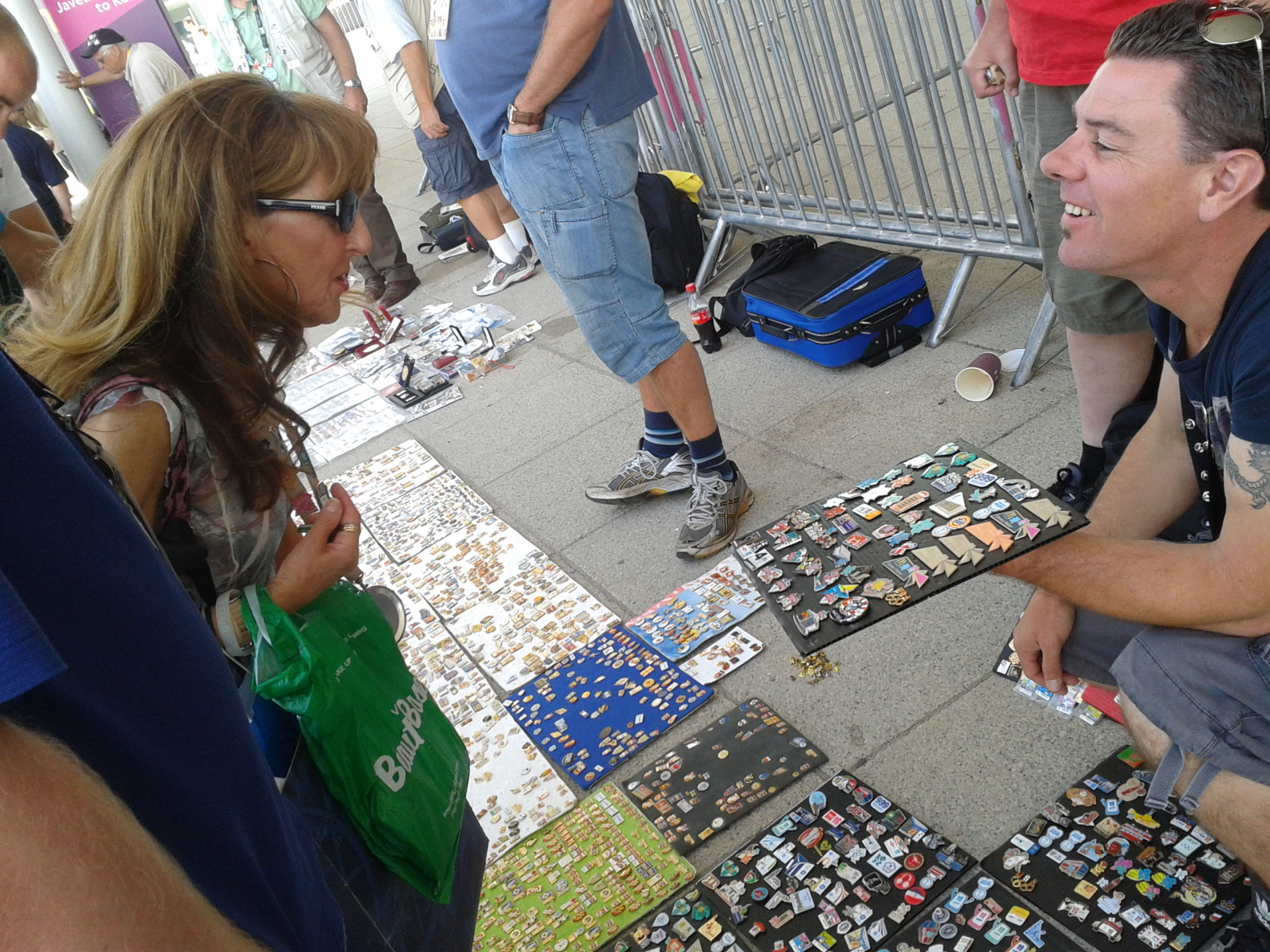
Pin trading at the 2012 London Olympics

In the sports memorabilia industry, there are two main focuses of collectors: autographed cards and tickets, and used clothing and equipment. Signed cards and tickets are preferred in pristine condition, while used uniforms are considered to be more desirable when they are unwashed, as stains from dirt, grass, blood, and sweat add value. Unique or odd items are also highly collectible, and items such as hair, floorboards, and chairs from stadiums have sold for large quantities of money. "Rookie" memorabilia, meaning items from an athlete's first year as a professional player, are valued by collectors. Rookie cards are often considered by collectors to be the most desirable kind of trading cards.

At the Olympic Games, there is a thriving market for collectible lapel pins. Various pins representing media organizations, sponsors, athletes, nations, and mascots are distributed, and athletes and attendees often engage in pin trading amongst themselves to collect them. The tradition began at the 1896 Summer Olympics in Athens, where cardboard pins were worn by coaches, athletes, and reporters for identification. Some pins have become highly coveted by collectors, including a pin from the 2016 Summer Olympics featuring an image of Pikachu and a pin from the 2024 Summer Olympics featuring an image of Snoop Dogg.

== See also ==
- Pin trading
- Trading card
  - American football card
  - Association football card
  - Australian rules football card
  - Baseball card
  - Basketball card
  - Hockey card
  - Jersey cards
  - Rugby card
