= Collectable (disambiguation) =

A collectable or collectible (American English) is any object regarded as being of value or interest to a collector.

Collectables or collectibles may also refer to:

- Collectables Records, a record label
- Collectables by Ashanti, a 2005 Ashanti album
- Collectibles Vol 1, a compilation album by Willie P. Bennett
- Collectable, a 2004 compilation album by Shakin' Stevens
- Collectible (video games), items that can be collected in a video game

== See also ==
- List of collectibles
