= A Twink and a Redhead (EP) =

EP by Grant & Ash
- Released: November 22, 2024
- Genres: Comedy; pop; rock; country
- Length: 14:30
- Producer: Drew Louis

Singles from A Twink and a Redhead
- 1. "A Twink and a Redhead" Released: May 31, 2024; 2. "Panera" Released: August 16, 2024; 3. "Heterosexuality" Released: October 25, 2024

A Twink and a Redhead is the debut extended play by American musician and influencer duo Grant & Ash, released on November 22, 2024. The EP blends comedic lyrics with pop, rock, and country tracks.

== Composition ==
A Twink and a Redhead is a comedic EP, with genres spanning from pop to country. Lead single "A Twink and a Redhead" went viral on TikTok, alongside second single "Panera". Third single "Heterosexuality" is a country track satirizing heteronormativity. Drew Louis oversaw production and writing of the EP, which features songs co-written with Grant Gibbs, Ashley Gill, and Nick Laughlin. Louis noted their intent of juxtaposing the comedic lyrics with tracks that take themselves seriously.

== Track listing ==
Track listing and credits adapted from Apple Music and Spotify.

A Twink and a Redhead – standard edition track listing
No.	Title	Writer(s)	Producer(s)	Length
1.	"Heterosexuality"	Grant Gibbs; Ashley Gill; Drew Louis; Nick Laughlin	Drew Louis	2:26
2.	"A Twink and a Redhead"	Gibbs; Gill; Louis	Louis	2:18
3.	"Panera"	Gibbs; Gill; Louis	Louis	1:59
4.	"BJ Maxx"	Gibbs; Gill; Louis	Louis	2:41
5.	"Sixth Grade Carnival"	Gibbs; Gill; Louis	Louis	2:25
6.	"Don Cheadle"	Gibbs; Gill; Louis	Louis	2:39
Total length:				14:30

== Personnel ==
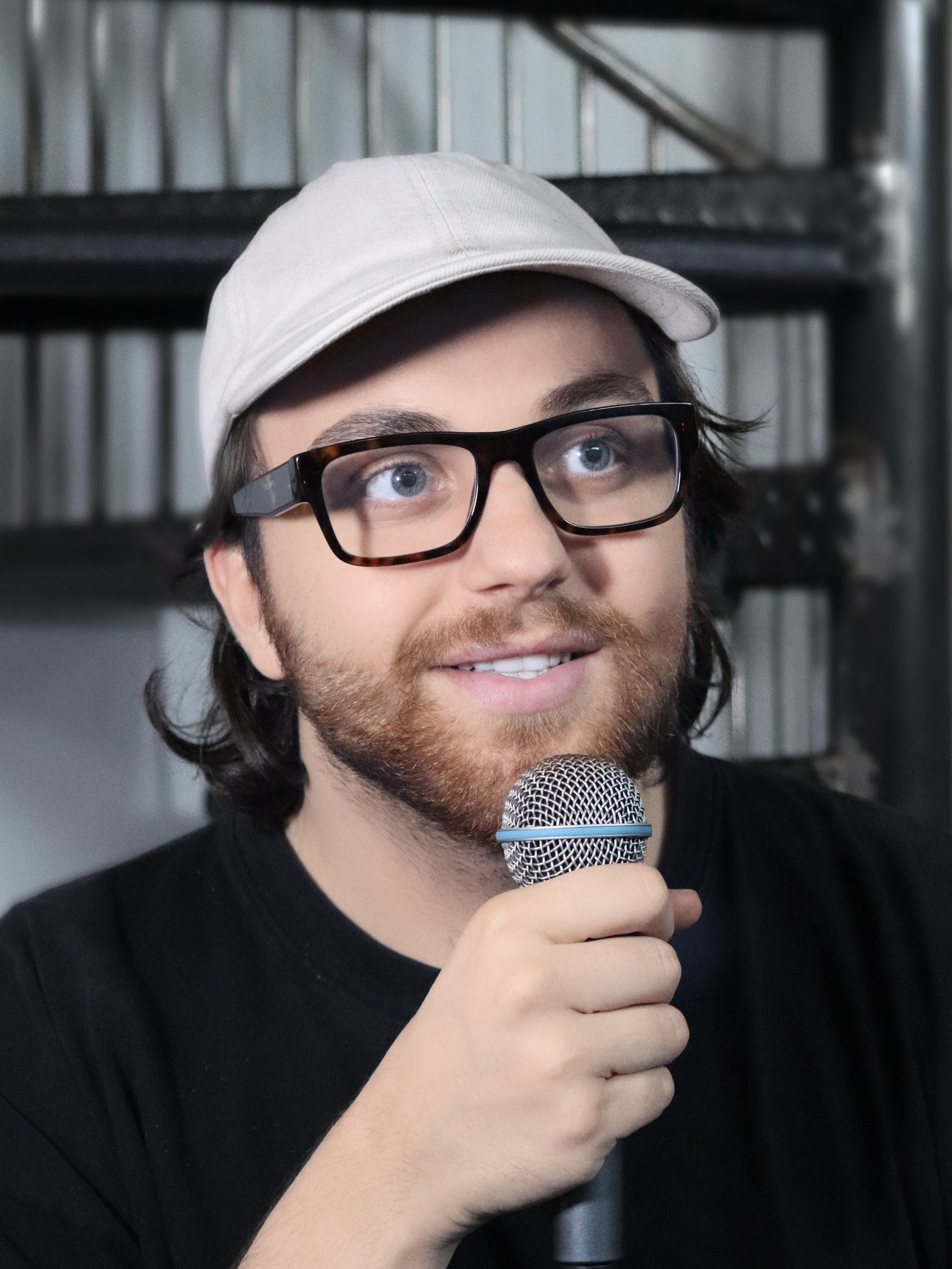
Drew Louis executive produced and co-wrote the EP.

Personnel adapted from Apple Music and Spotify.

- Grant Gibbs – vocals
- Ashley Gill – vocals
- Drew Louis – producer
