= Mouse Mingle =

Dating website

- Type: Dating service
- Founded: 1 December 2015
- Founder: Dave Tavres
- Website: https://www.mousemingle.com

Mouse Mingle is a dating website for Disney adults that launched in December 2015. It is a freemium service, with a monthly subscription fee being required to message other users, and is not affiliated with The Walt Disney Company. Dating profiles include trivia such as one's favorite characters and films. People can include information about whether they have an annual pass to Disney parks. There is also content about other Disney-owned franchises such as Marvel Entertainment and Star Wars. According to a writer from Thrillist, these questions function as "an obscenely long questionnaire". The website allows users to set a same-sex dating preference. There are also platonic matching options for friendship and "park pals".
