= Tyrosemiophilia =

Hobby of collecting cheese labels

Tyrosemiophilia is the hobby of collecting cheese labels. As of May 2019, the world's largest collection encompasses 250,655 label designs.
