= A Twink and a Redhead =

American influencer and musical duo

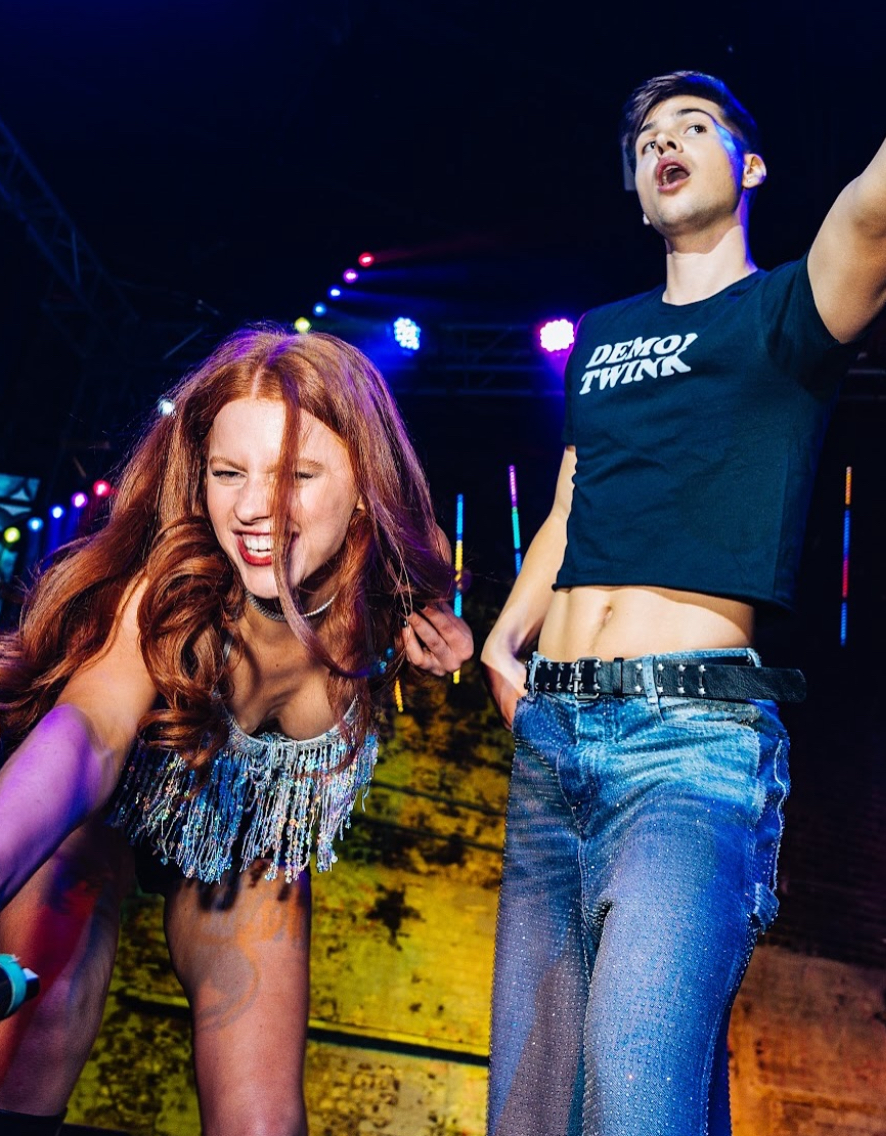

Background information
- Also known as: Grant & Ash
- Origin: New York, New York
- Genre: Pop
- Years active: 2022–present
- Members: Grant Gibbs; Ashley Gill
- Website: atwinkandaredhead.com

TikTok information
- Page: Grant & Ash
- Followers: 616.6K (12 August 2026)

A Twink and a Redhead, also known as Grant & Ash, are an American musician and influencer duo composed of Grant Gibbs and Ashley Gill. They create satirical music and content.

== Career ==
Grant & Ash started posting content in March 2022 on TikTok. They gained media attention from Rolling Stone in January 2024 when they released a satirical video on TikTok claiming to be "Disney Swingers". In the video they stated that they used a fictional app called "Swingers Upon Main" to find couples who want to swing at Walt Disney World. They attended the 2024 Democratic National Convention, and are cited for starting the viral movement "Twinks for Kamala" on CNN, showing their support for candidate Kamala Harris.

In 2024, songwriter and producer Drew Louis discovered the duo, and reached out to produce a studio version of "A Twink and a Redhead". They released the single streaming services under the name Grant & Ash in June 2024. They then released their second single "Panera" in August 2024. The following month, they attended the 2024 MTV Video Music Awards. In October 2024, they teased their new single “Heterosexuality” with a satirical engagement. Their debut EP, A Twink and a Redhead was released November 22, 2024. Louis wanted to juxtapose the comedic lyrics by creating songs that sonically take themselves seriously. In January 2025, "A Twink and a Redhead" was nominated for the Queerties Anthem award.

In August 2026, Deadline reported that the duo signed to Creative Artists Agency.

== Discography ==
All credits are adapted from Apple Music and Spotify.

=== As lead artist ===
==== Singles ====
Year	Title	Album	Writer(s)	Producer(s)
2026	“Hot Cross Buns”	Non-album singles	Grant Gibbs, Ashley Gill, Drew Louis, Michelle Zarlenga	Drew Louis
2026	“A Twink and a Redhead and a Mother” (featuring Trisha Paytas)	Non-album singles	Grant Gibbs, Ashley Gill, Drew Louis	Drew Louis
2025	“Jingle Bells”	Non-album singles	James Lord Pierpont	Drew Louis
2025	“Disney Adult”	Non-album singles	Grant Gibbs, Ashley Gill, Nick Laughlin, Drew Louis	Drew Louis
2025	“Barnes & Noble”	Non-album singles	Grant Gibbs, Ashley Gill, Drew Louis	Drew Louis
2024	"Heterosexuality"	A Twink and a Redhead	Grant Gibbs, Ashley Gill, Nick Laughlin, Drew Louis	Drew Louis
2024	"Panera"	A Twink and a Redhead	Grant Gibbs, Ashley Gill, Drew Louis	Drew Louis
2024	"A Twink and a Redhead"	A Twink and a Redhead	Grant Gibbs, Ashley Gill, Drew Louis	Drew Louis

==== Extended plays ====
Title	Details
A Twink and a Redhead	Released: November 22, 2024; Label: Self-released; Format: Digital download, streaming

=== Music Videos ===
Year	Title	Director	Ref.
2025	“Barnes & Noble"	Nick Laughlin	
2024	“Heterosexuality"	Nick Laughlin	
2024	"Panera"	Nick Laughlin	
2024	"A Twink and a Redhead"	Nick Laughlin	

== Awards and nominations ==
Year	Award ceremony	Nominee(s)/work(s)	Category	Result	Ref.
2026	Webby Awards	InStyle's "The Intern" Series	Multi-Creator Campaign Creators	Won	
2025	The Queerties	"A Twink and a Redhead"	Anthem	Nominated	
