= Jersey cards =

Jersey card
- Other names: Costume cards
- Type: Trading card
- Company: Upper Deck; Topps
- Country: United States
- Availability: 1996–present

Jersey cards or costume cards are baseball, American football, basketball, ice hockey, and other sports collector cards that have a small piece of the featured player's (or players') jersey in the card. Jersey cards were first introduced by Upper Deck in 1996.

Sometimes jersey cards may include other kinds of memorabilia.

== Types of jersey cards ==
The average size of a jersey swatch is about 3/4 of an inch, but the size may differ by product. One of the types of jersey card is a jumbo swatch. This piece of jersey is about 5 times the size of a regular jersey card. The serial numbering is low (usually 50 copies or fewer). Another type of jersey card that is often eye catching is the jersey patch. It is a jersey card that has at least 2 different colors of jersey on it. These cards are also rare, often numbered to 35 copies or fewer. One more type is an event-worn jersey. It was worn in a special event, such as a draft, all-star game, championship game, or other events. These cards are not as rare as the others, but many of them are numbered.

In motor racing, there are pieces of tire from a specific car, pieces of the flags, and other memorabilia from the racetrack. Apart from the average jersey card, there are other cards, of which there are too many to name. There are basketball shorts jersey cards, hockey skate cards, baseball bat cards, basketball ball cards, etc. Some jersey cards even have pieces of a hat that was worn in the NBA draft, some of which are autographed. The rarest kind of jersey card is called a tag card. It is an official logo from a player's jersey. Examples are the NBA logo, the NFL logo, and other logos. Each card is a 1 of 1, meaning that only 1 copy was made.
