= Souvenir =

Object that may be bought to recall an event from the past, like travel

A souvenir (French for 'remembrance' or 'memory'), memento, keepsake, or token of remembrance is an object a person acquires for the memories the owner associates with it. A souvenir can be any object that can be collected or purchased and transported home by the traveler as a memento of a visit. The object itself may have intrinsic value, or be a symbol of experience. Without the owner's input, the symbolic meaning is lost and cannot be articulated.

== As objects ==
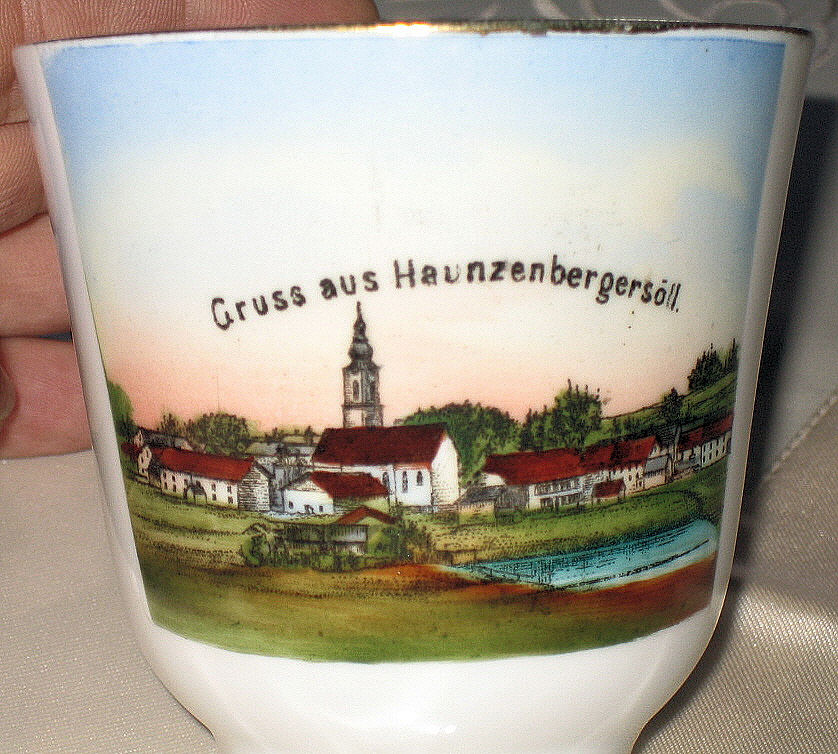
Souvenir porcelain mug from Germany, c. 1900

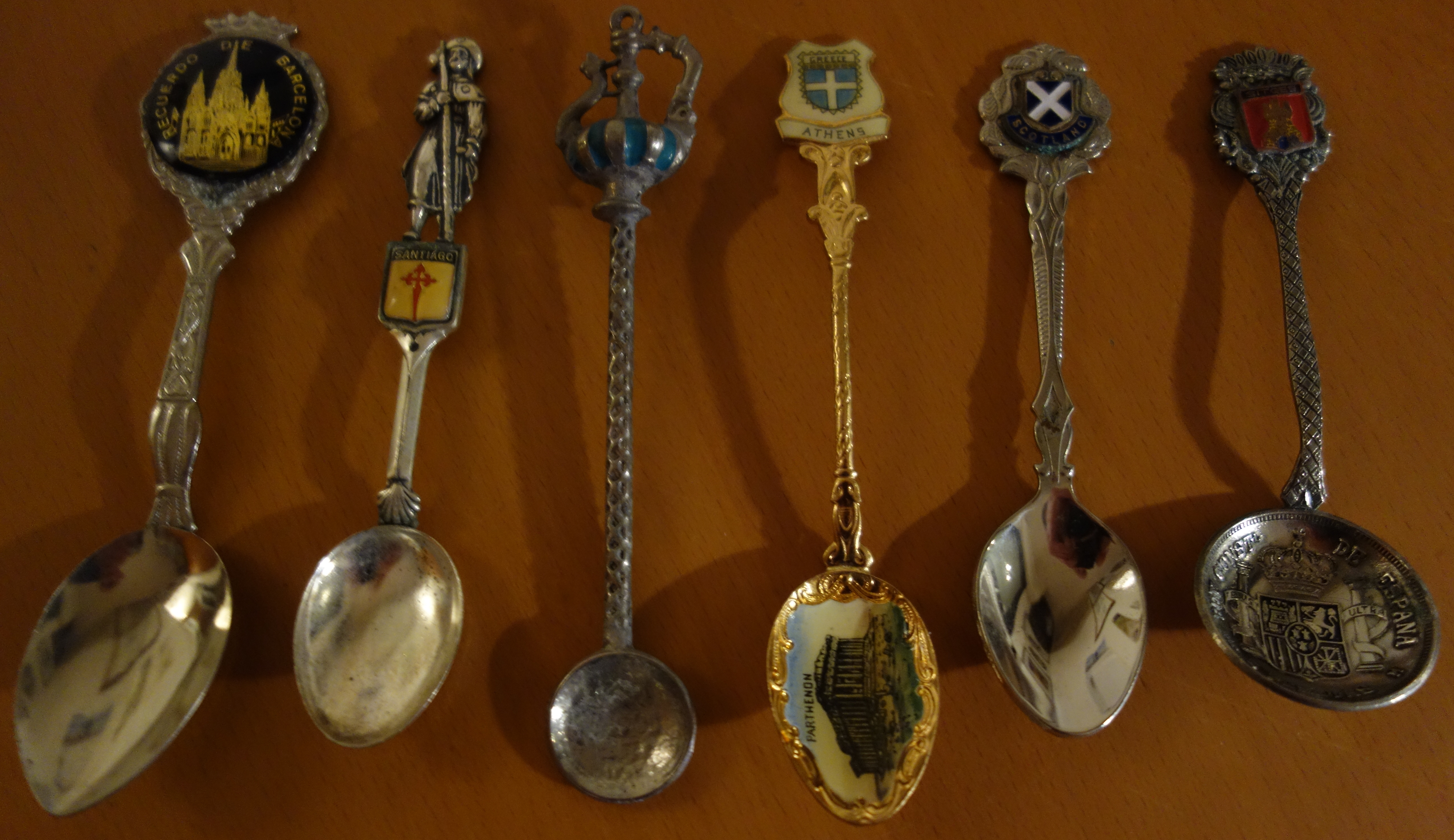
Souvenir spoons featuring coats of arms from various countries

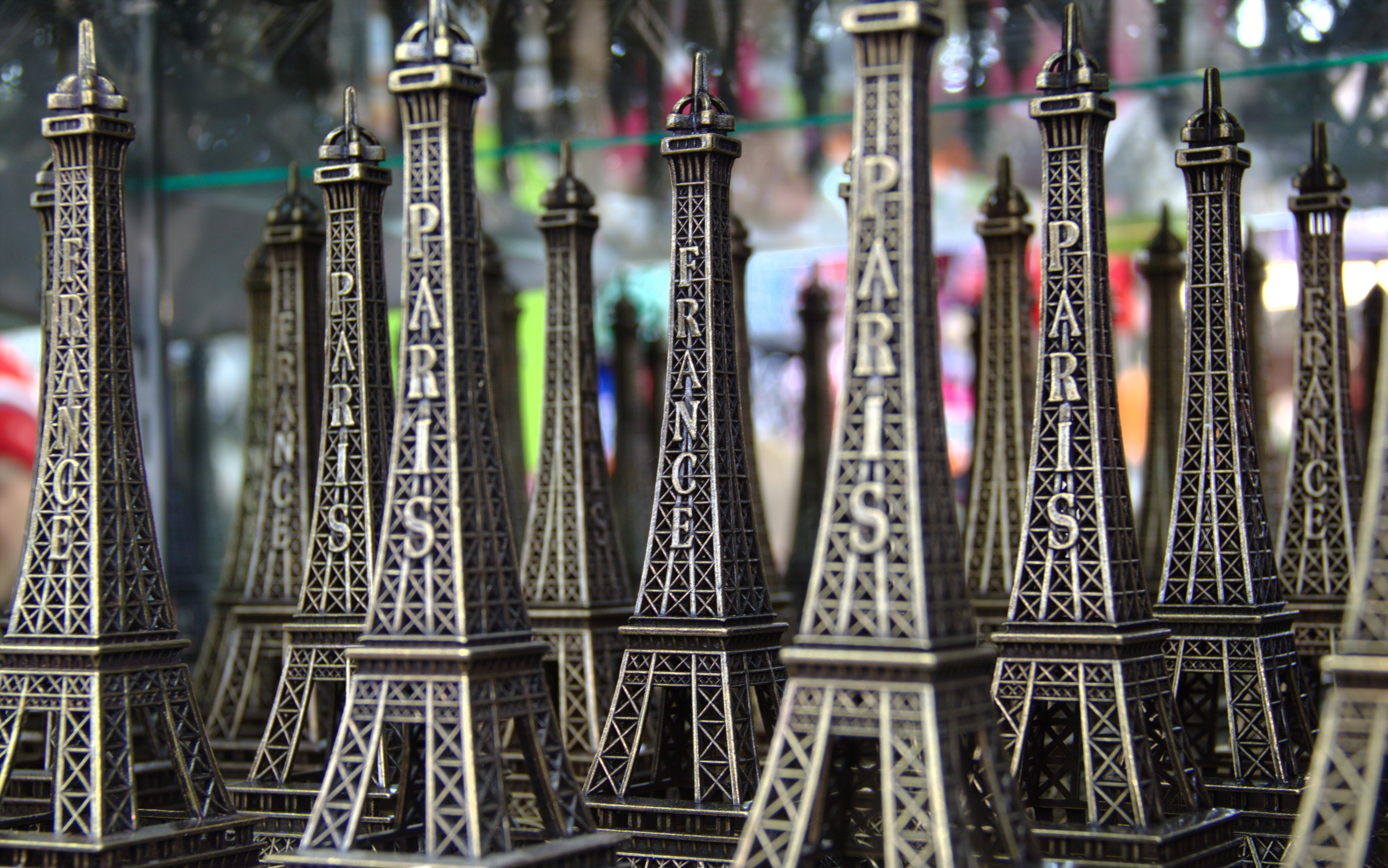
Miniature Eiffel Tower souvenirs from Paris, France

The tourism industry designates tourism souvenirs as commemorative merchandise associated with a location, often including geographic information and usually produced in a manner that promotes souvenir collecting.

Throughout the world, the souvenir trade is an important part of the tourism industry serving a dual role, first to help improve the local economy, and second to allow visitors to take with them a memento of their visit, ultimately to encourage an opportunity for a return visit, or to promote the locale to other tourists as a form of word-of-mouth marketing. Promotional tchotchke at trade shows serve a similar function. Perhaps the most collected souvenirs by tourists are self-generated: photographs as a medium to document specific events and places for remembrance.

Souvenirs as objects include mass-produced merchandise such as clothing: T-shirts and hats; collectables: postcards, refrigerator magnets, key chains, pins, souvenir coins and tokens, miniature bells, models, figurines, statues; household items: spoons, mugs, bowls, plates, ashtrays, egg timers, fudge, notepads, coasters, and many others.

Souvenirs also include non-mass-produced items such as folk art, local artisan handicrafts, objects that represent the traditions and culture of the area, non-commercial, natural objects such as sand from a beach, and anything else that a person attaches nostalgic value to and collects among their personal belongings. The collecting of natural items such as seashells, plants, or rocks is often discouraged due to ecological damage. Especially the export of endangered plants and animals (or products made of their fur or leather) as souvenirs is strictly regulated by international laws.

A more grisly form of souvenir (here as an example of war booty) in the First World War was displayed by a Pathan soldier to an English Territorial. After carefully studying the Tommy's acquisitions (a fragment of shell, a spike and badge from a German helmet), he produced a cord with the ears of enemy soldiers he claimed to have killed. He was keeping them to take back to India for his wife.

== As memorabilia ==
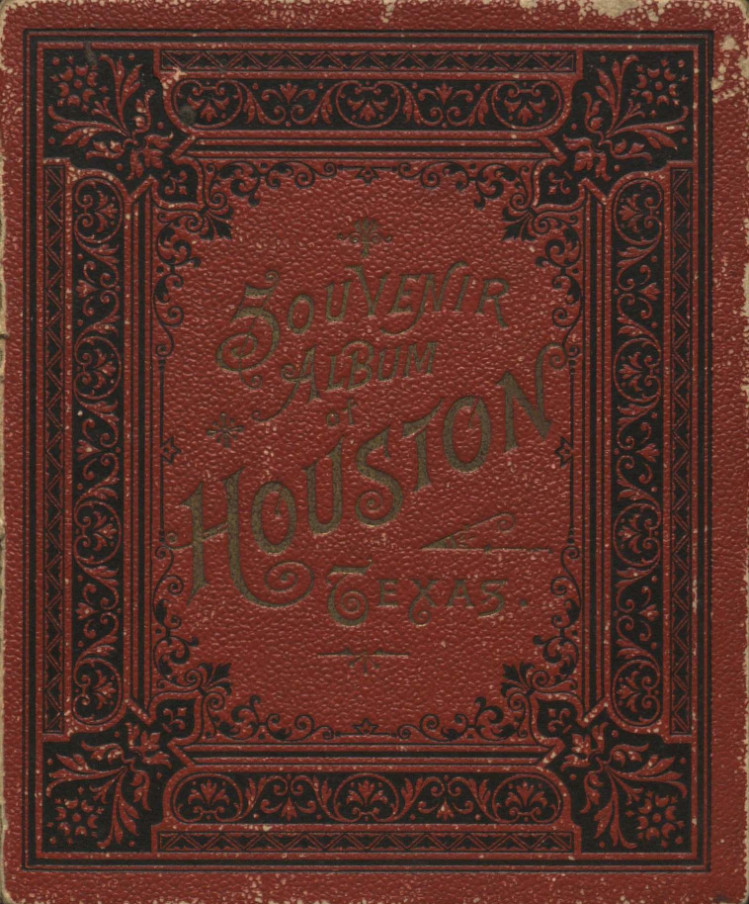
Souvenir Album of Houston, 1891

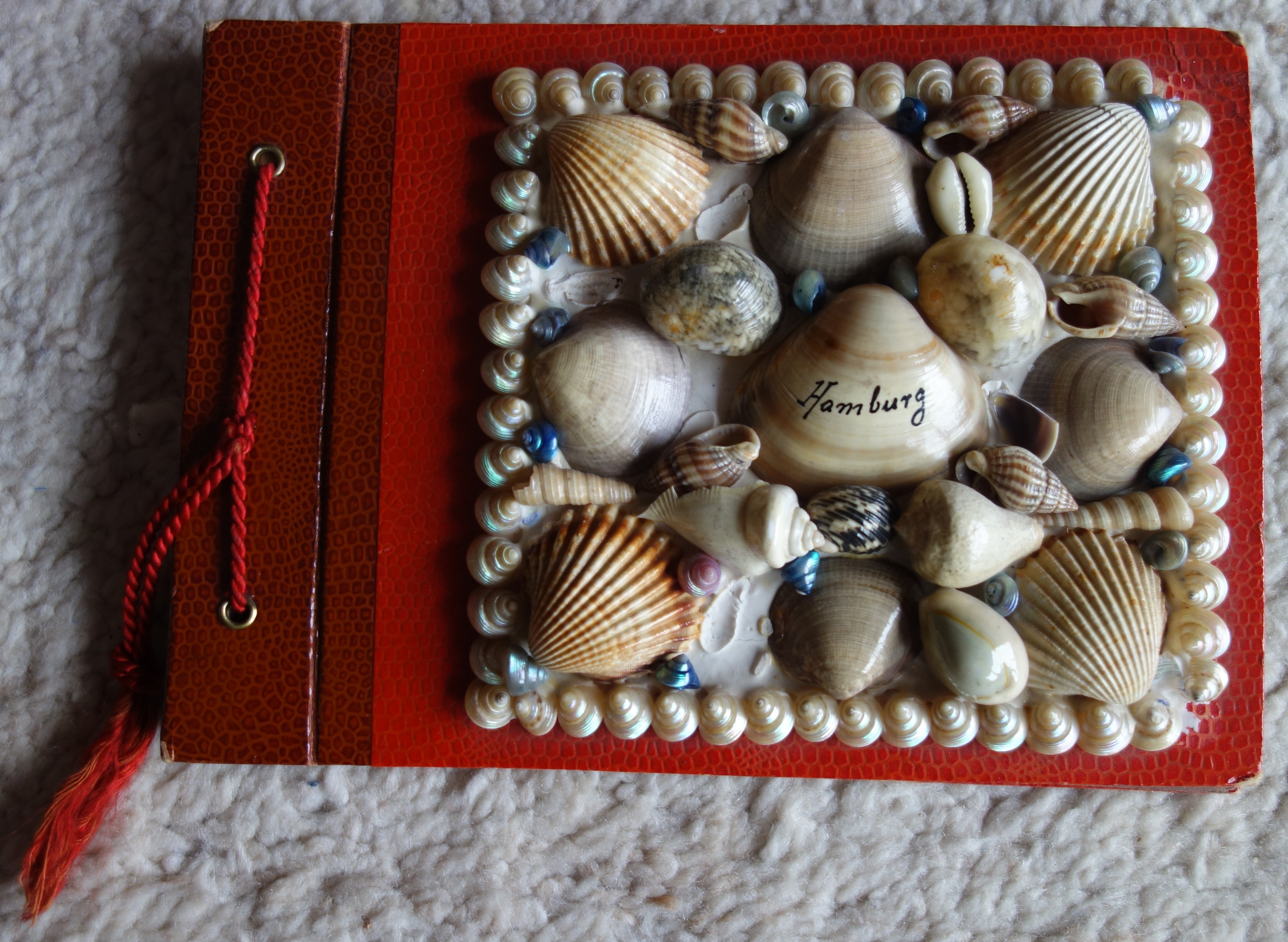
Souvenir Album of Hamburg with a cover made of seashells, 1957

Similar to souvenirs, memorabilia (Latin for 'memorable (things)'; plural of memorābile) are objects treasured for their memories or historical interest; however, unlike souvenirs, memorabilia can be valued for a connection to an event or a particular professional field, company or brand. Memorabilia can also be related to collections, such as action figures, or video games.

Examples include sporting events, historical events, culture, and entertainment. Such items include: clothing; game equipment; publicity photographs and posters; magic memorabilia; other entertainment-related merchandise and memorabilia; movie memorabilia; airline and other transportation-related memorabilia; and pins, among others.

Often memorabilia items are kept in protective covers or display cases to safeguard and preserve their condition.

== As gifts ==
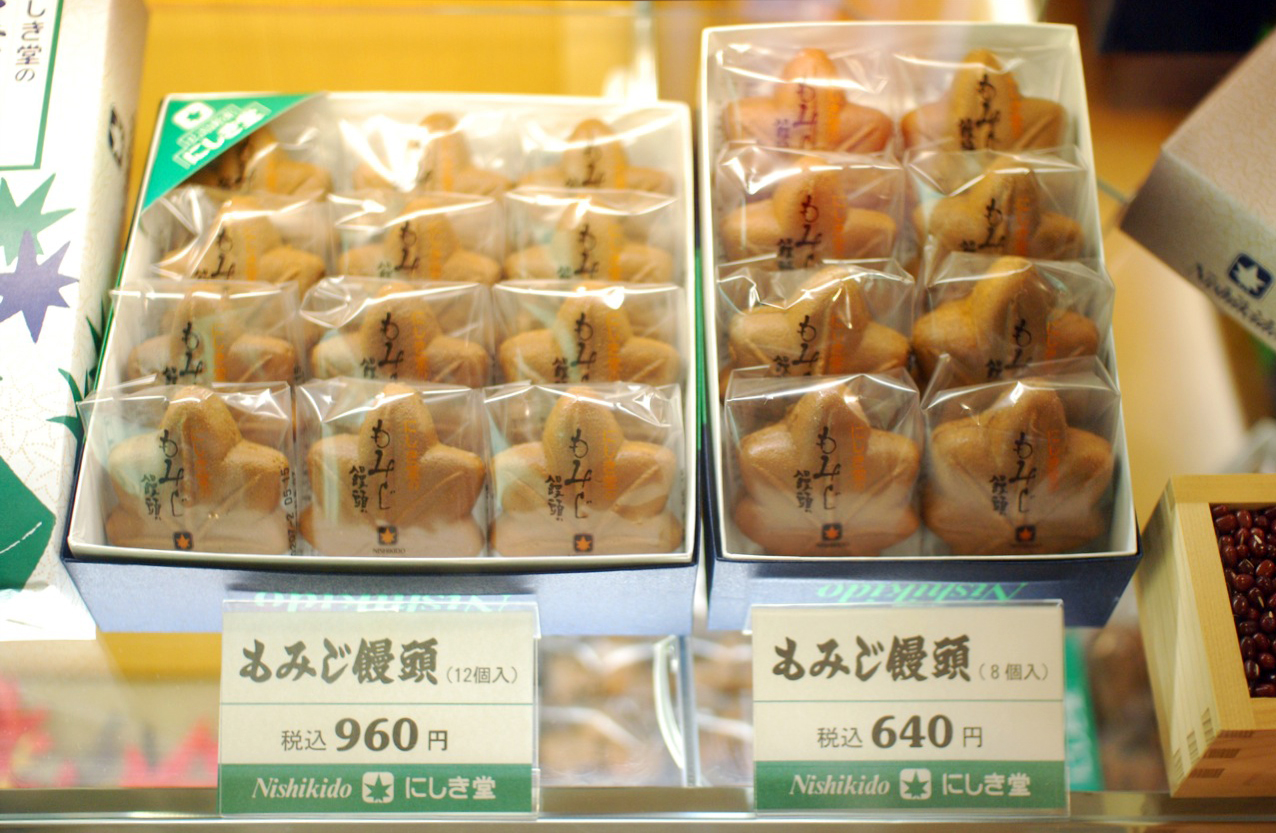
Momiji manju omiyage from Japan

In Japan, souvenirs are known as omiyage (お土産), and are frequently selected from meibutsu, or products associated with a particular region. Bringing back omiyage from trips to co-workers and families is a social obligation and can be considered a form of apology for the traveller's absence. Omiyage sales are big business at Japanese tourist sites. Unlike souvenirs, however, omiyage are frequently special food products, packaged into several small portions to be easily distributed to all the members of a family or a workplace.

Travelers may buy souvenirs as gifts for those who did not make the trip. A common tradition is to bring a thank-you gift for someone who provided a service such as pet sitting during the trip.

In the Philippines a similar tradition of bringing souvenirs as a gift to family members, friends, and coworkers is called pasalubong.

== Gallery ==
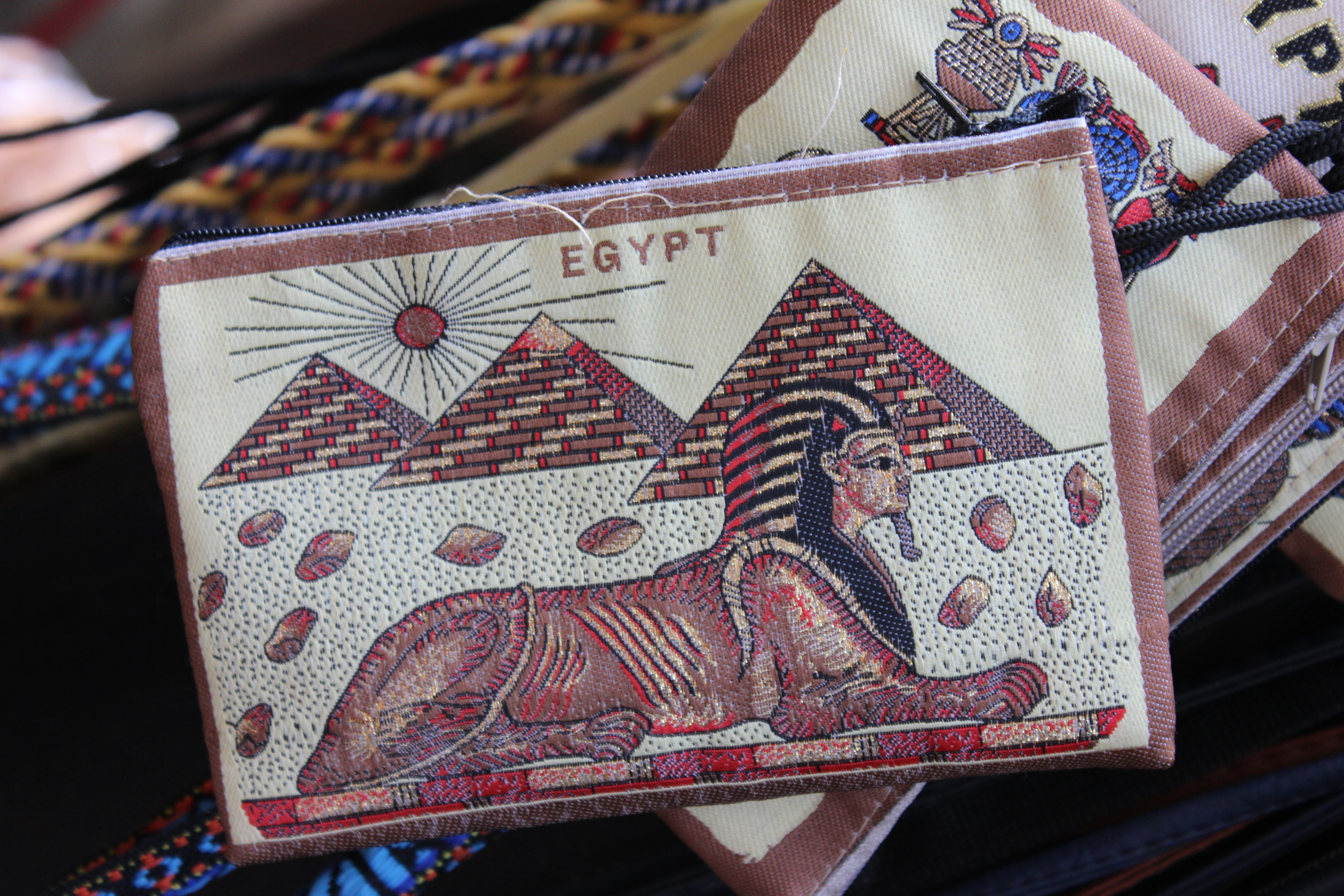
Pyramid and Great Sphinx souvenirs from Egypt

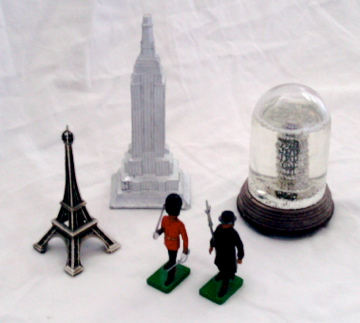
Examples of souvenirs: figurines, models, snow globe

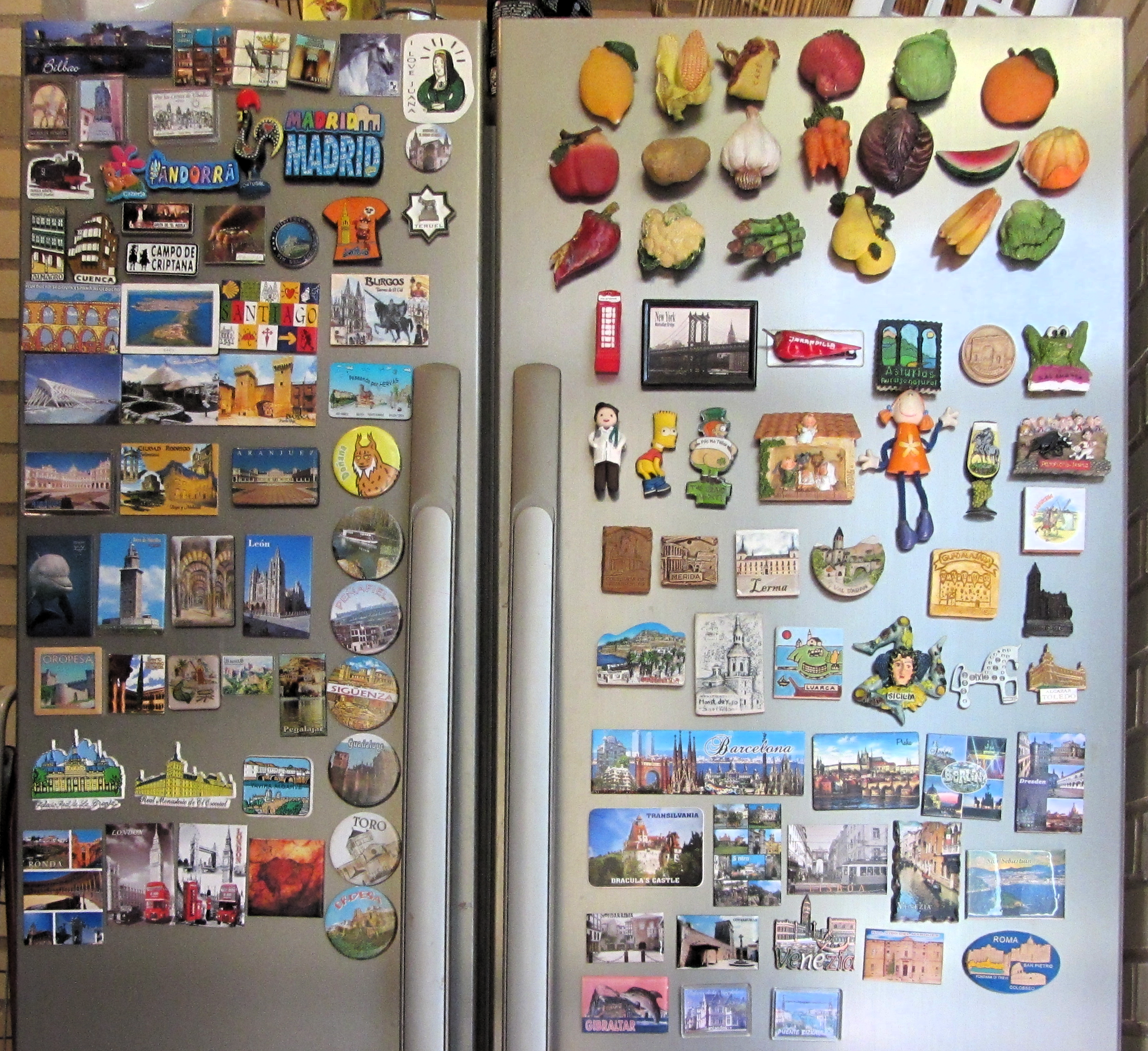
Fridge magnets

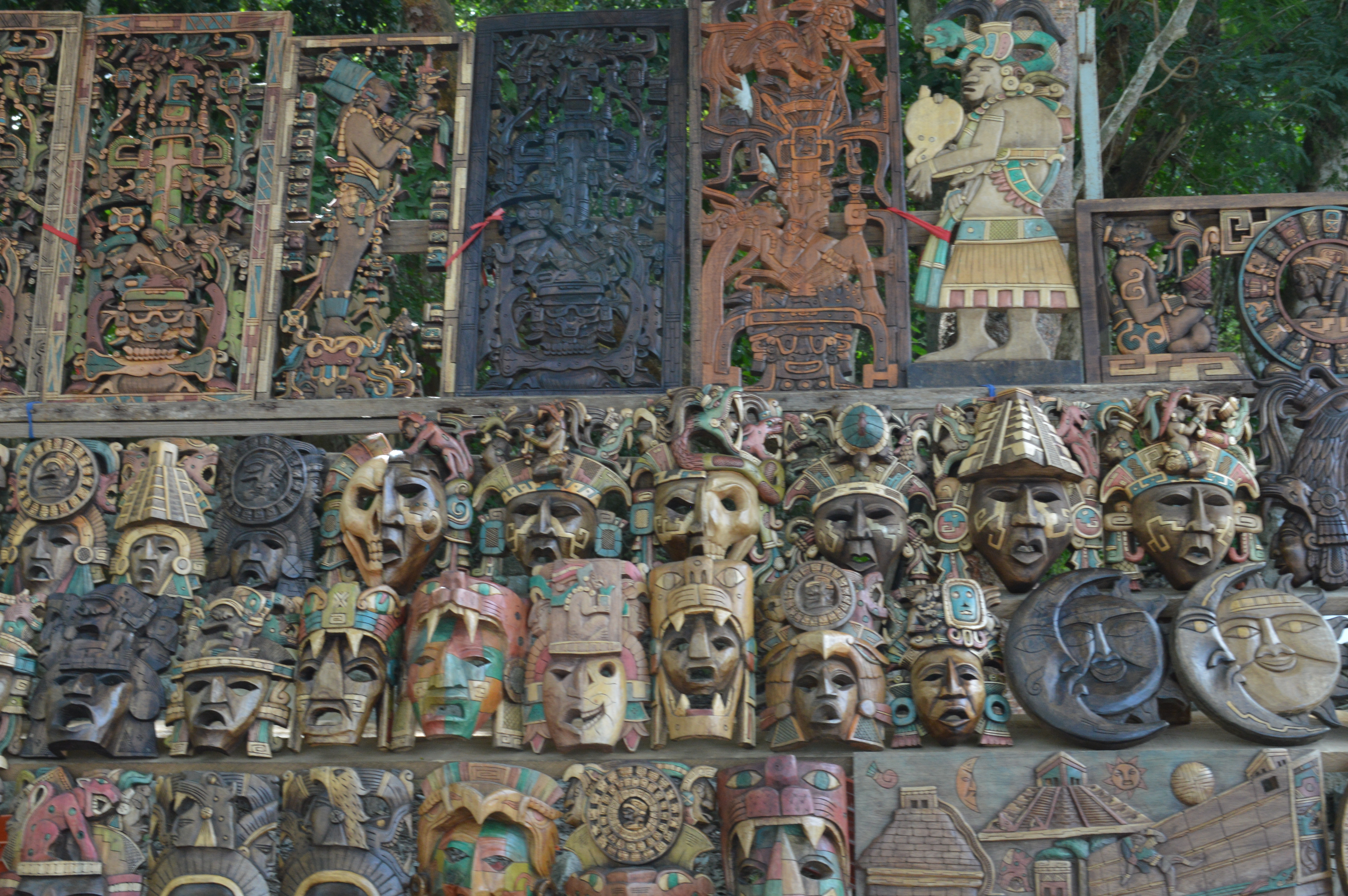
Hand-carved wood souvenirs (Chichén Itzá, Yucatán, Mexico)

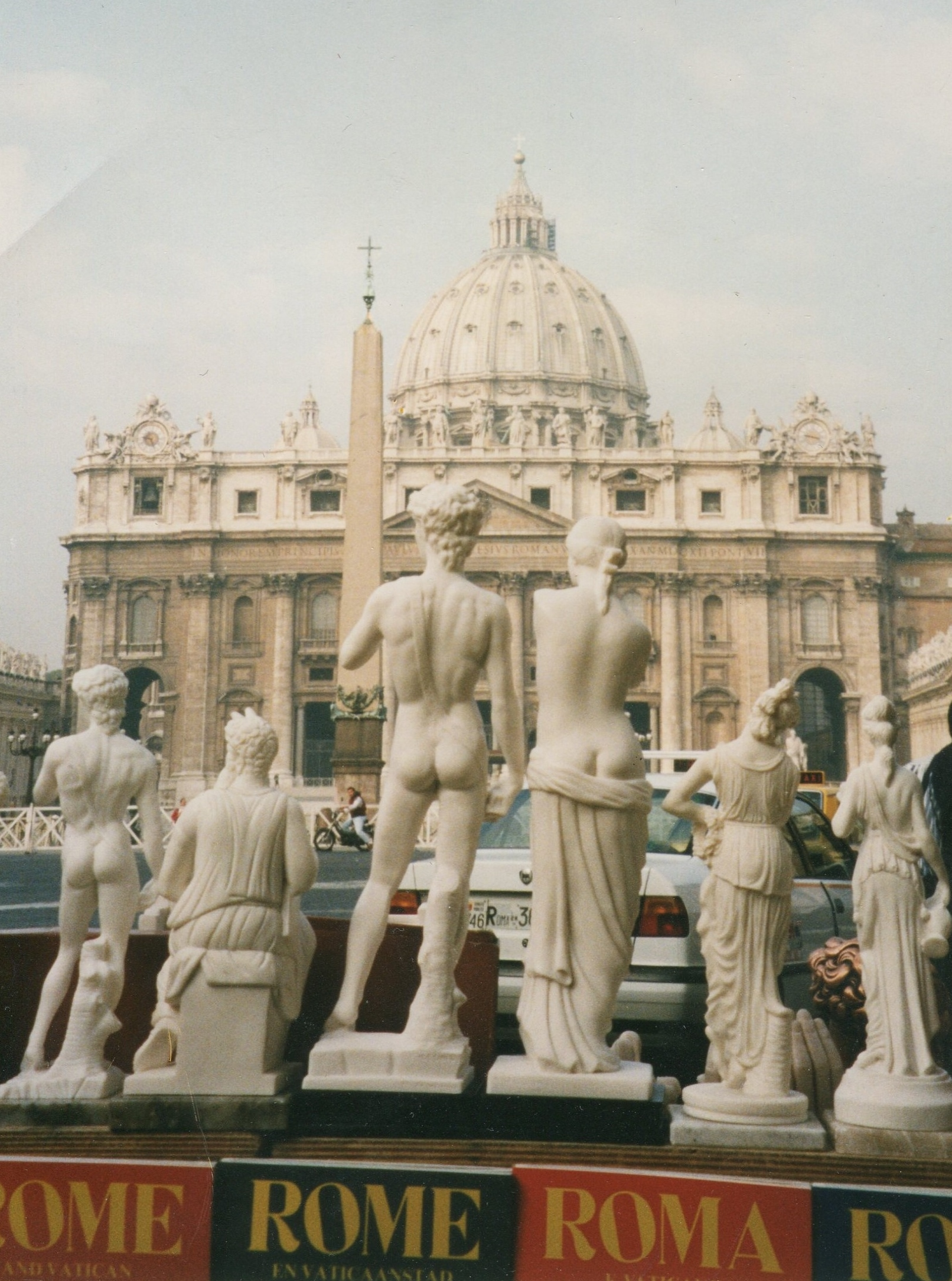
Souvenir statues (Rome, Italy)

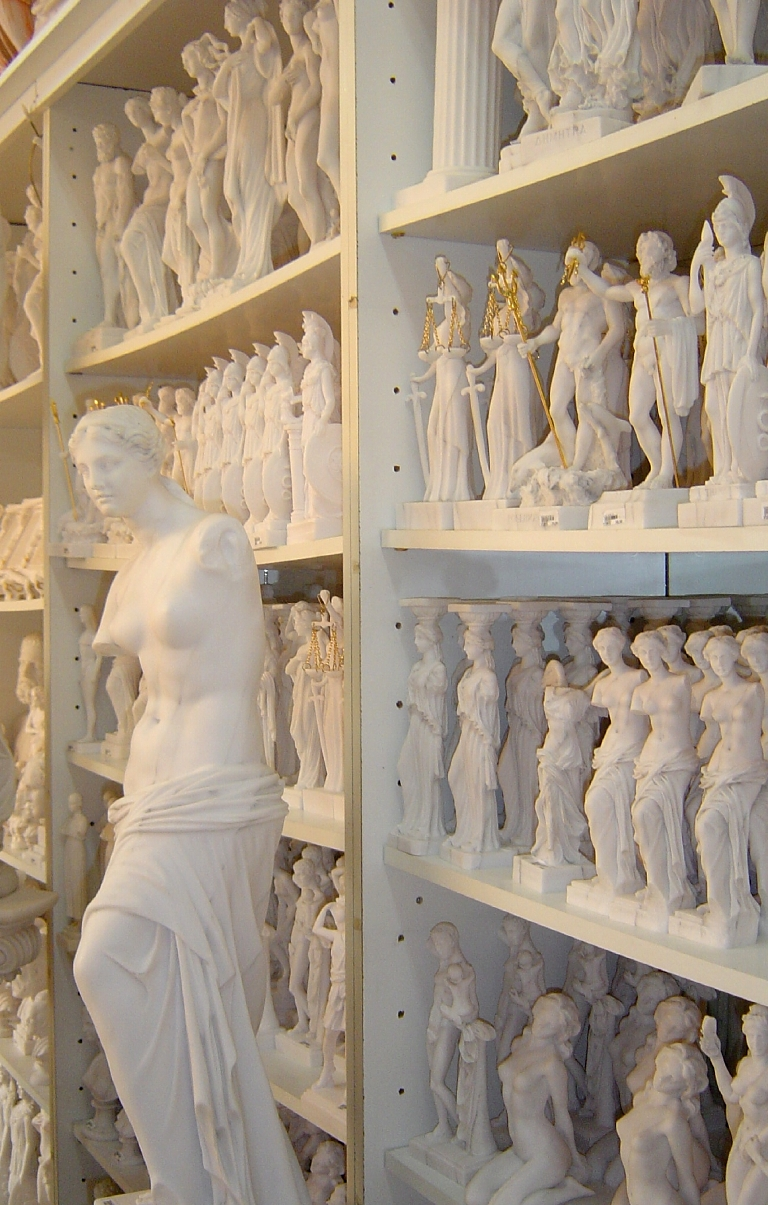
Souvenir statues (Greece)

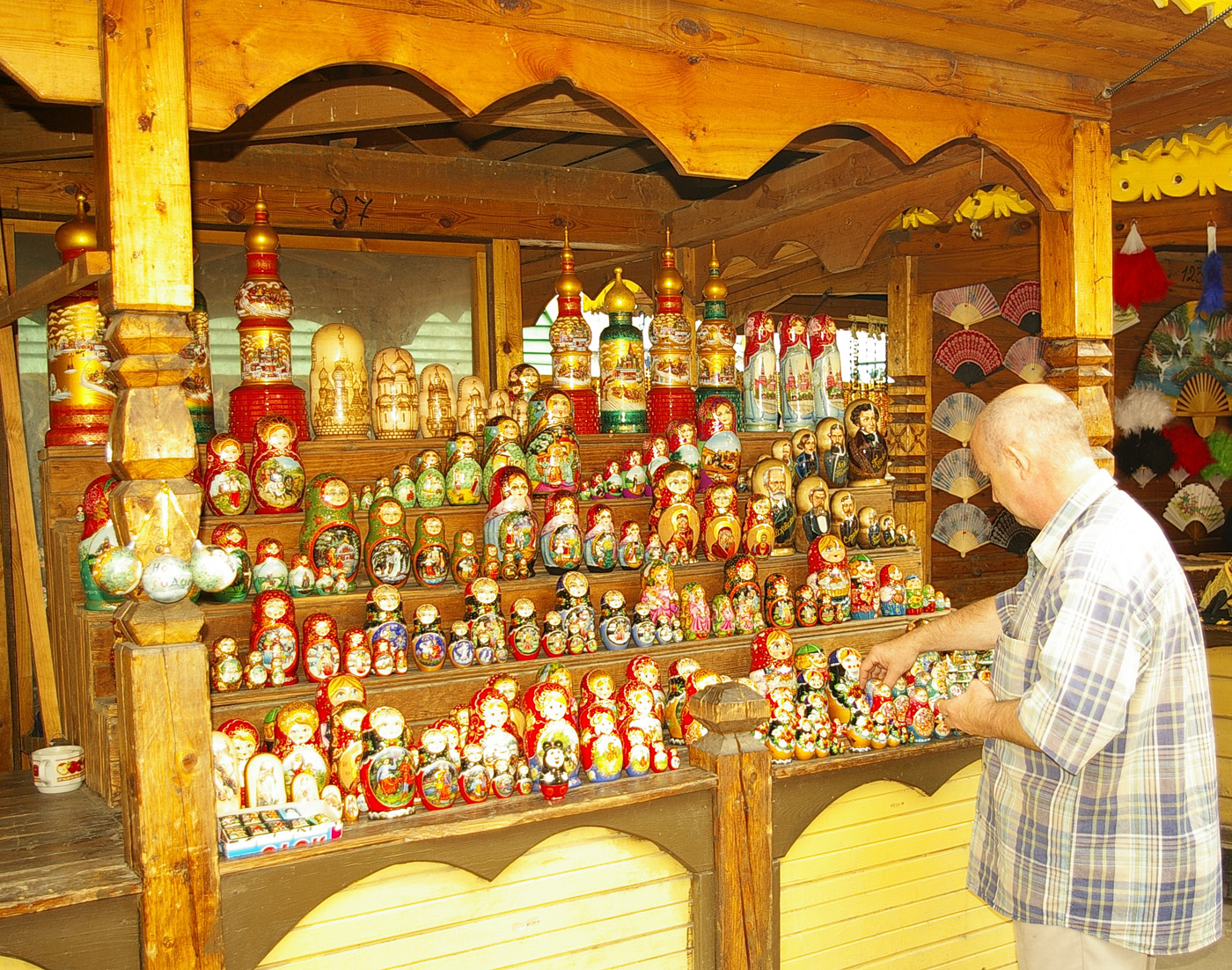
Matryoshka doll

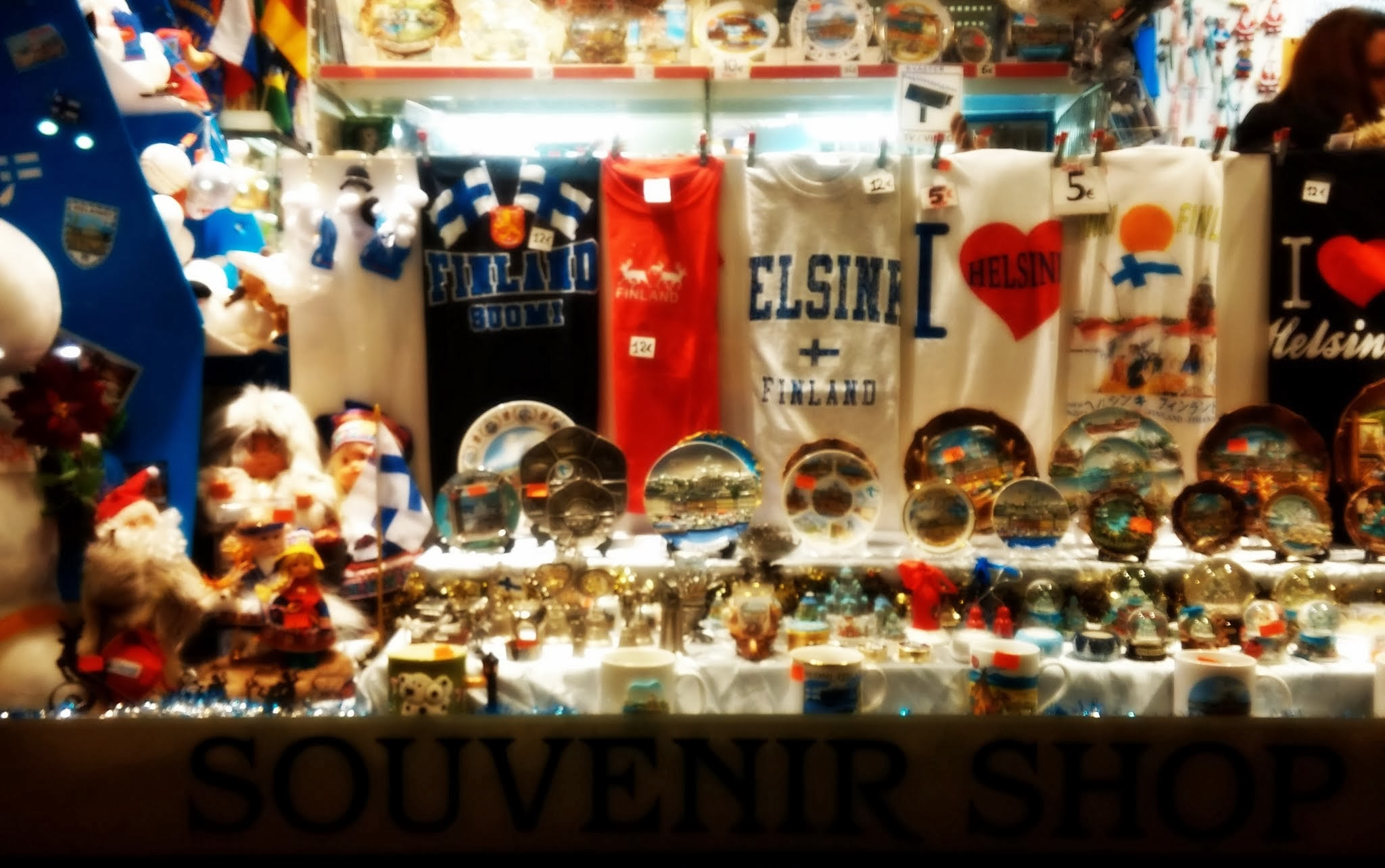
A souvenir shop along Aleksanterinkatu (Helsinki, Finland)

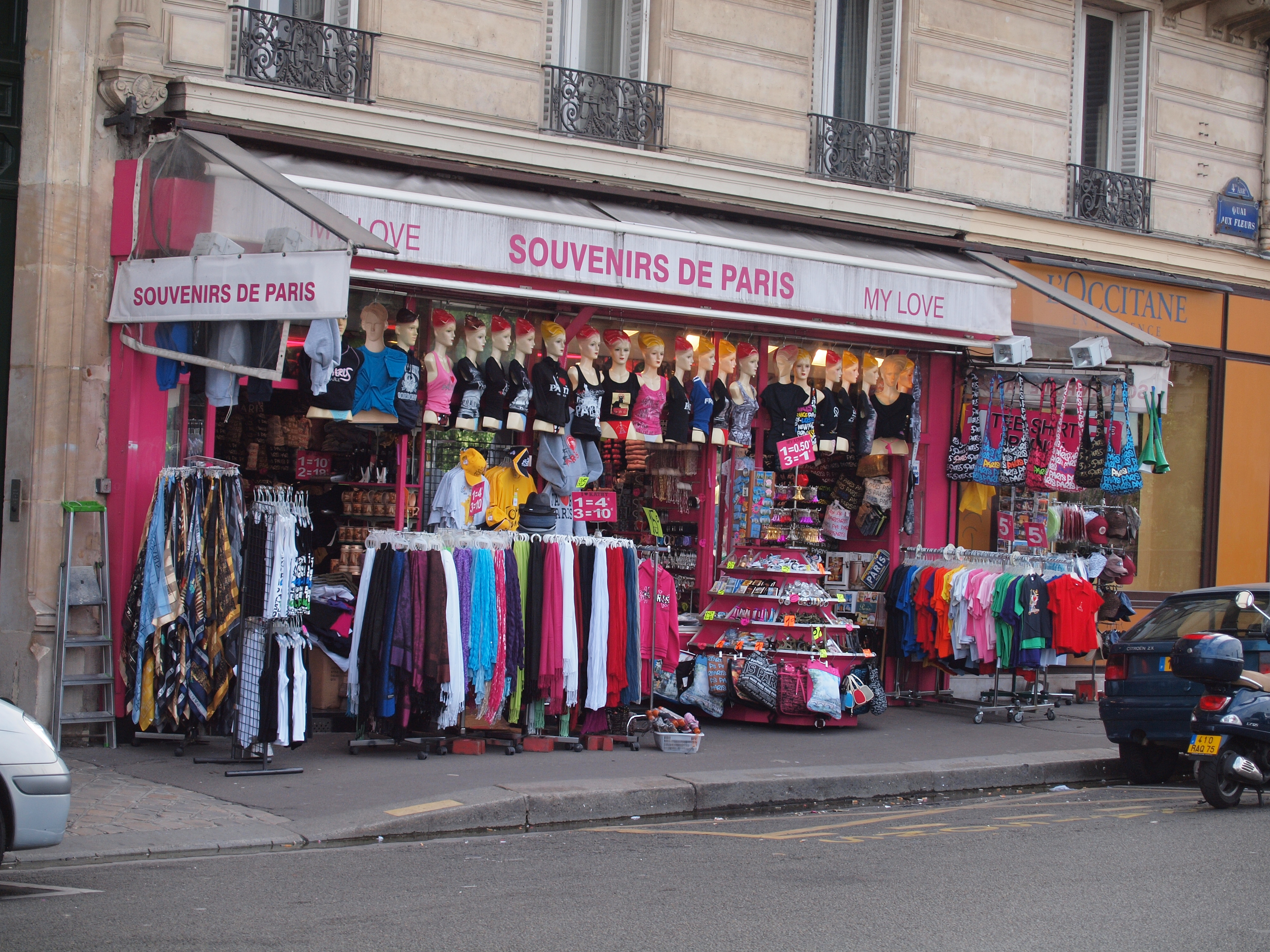
A souvenir shop (Paris, France)

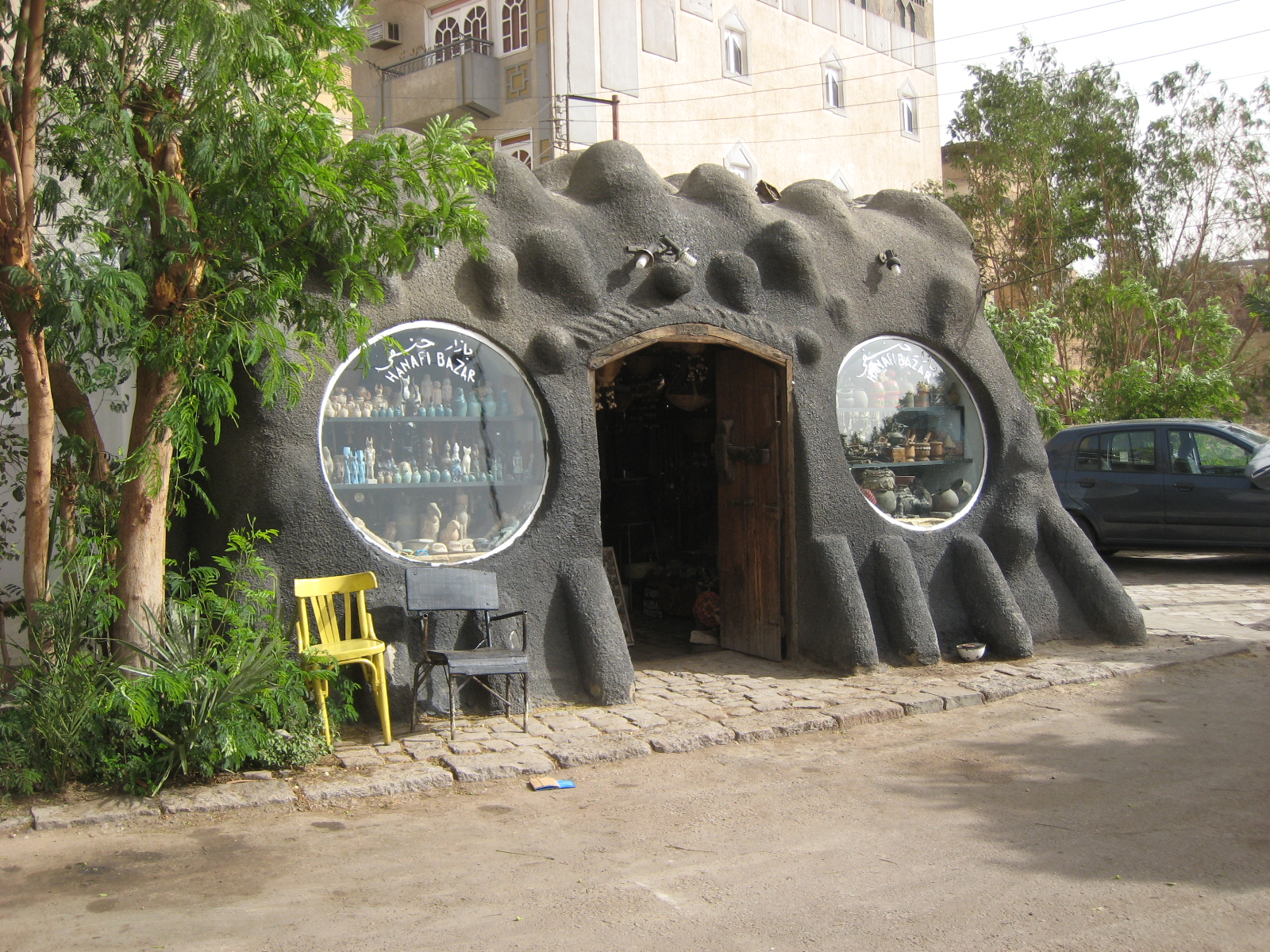
A souvenir shop (Egypt)

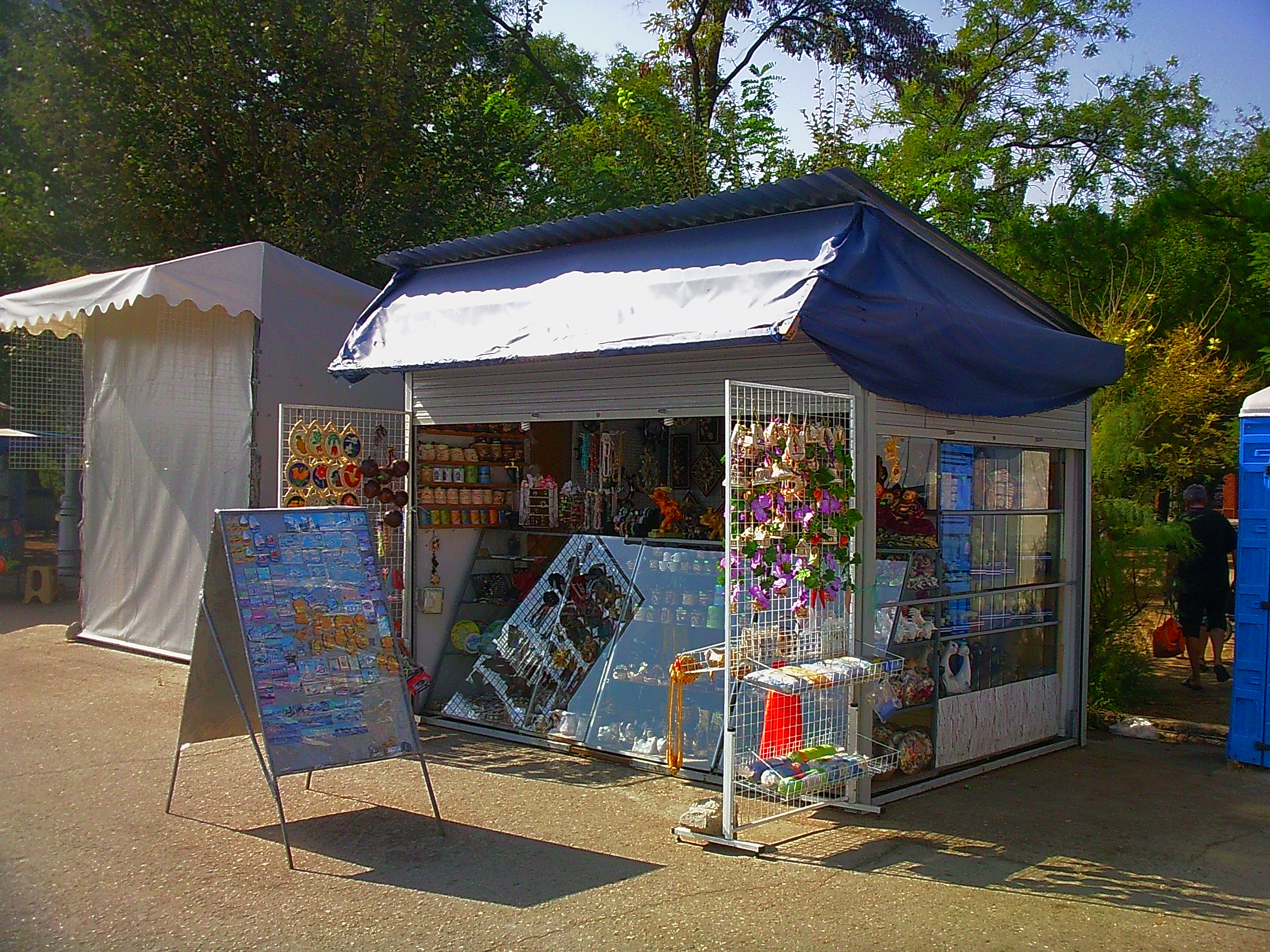
A souvenir kiosk (Eupatoria, Crimea, Ukraine)

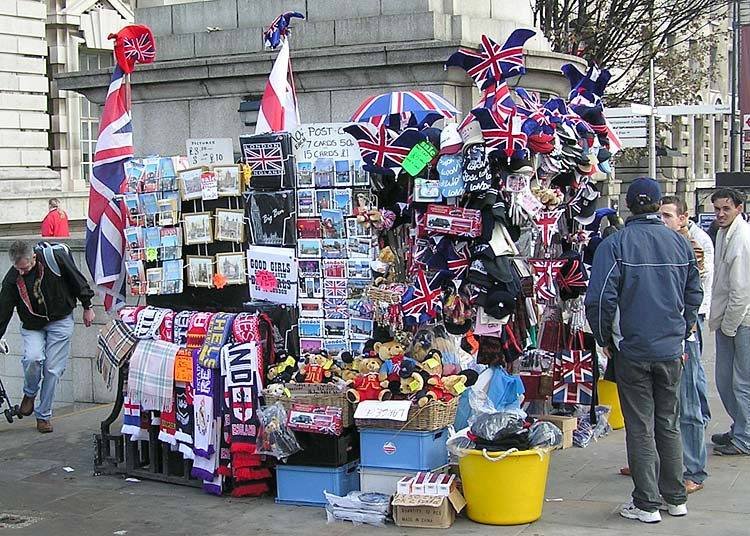
A souvenir stall (London, UK)

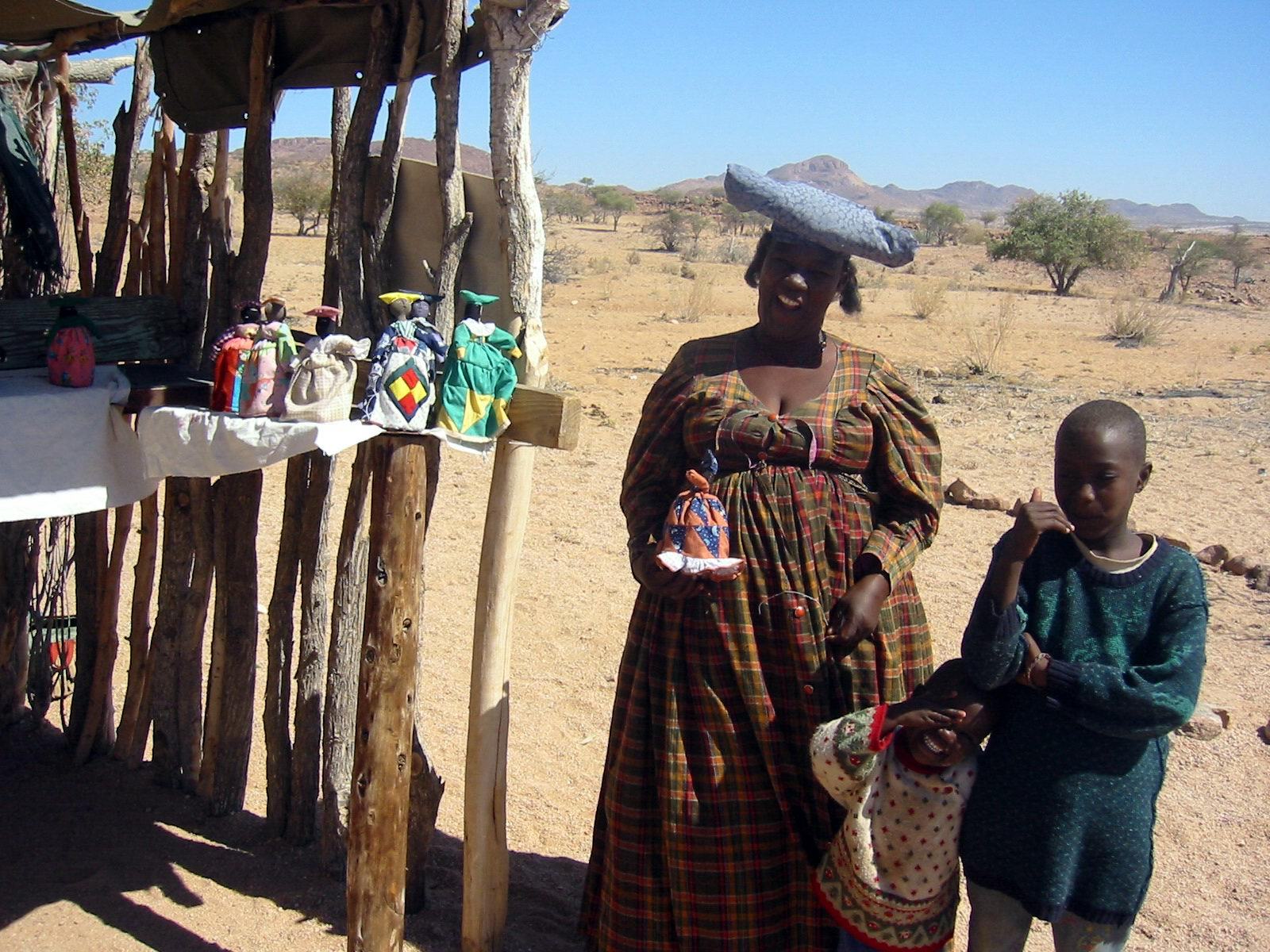
A souvenir stall (Namibia)

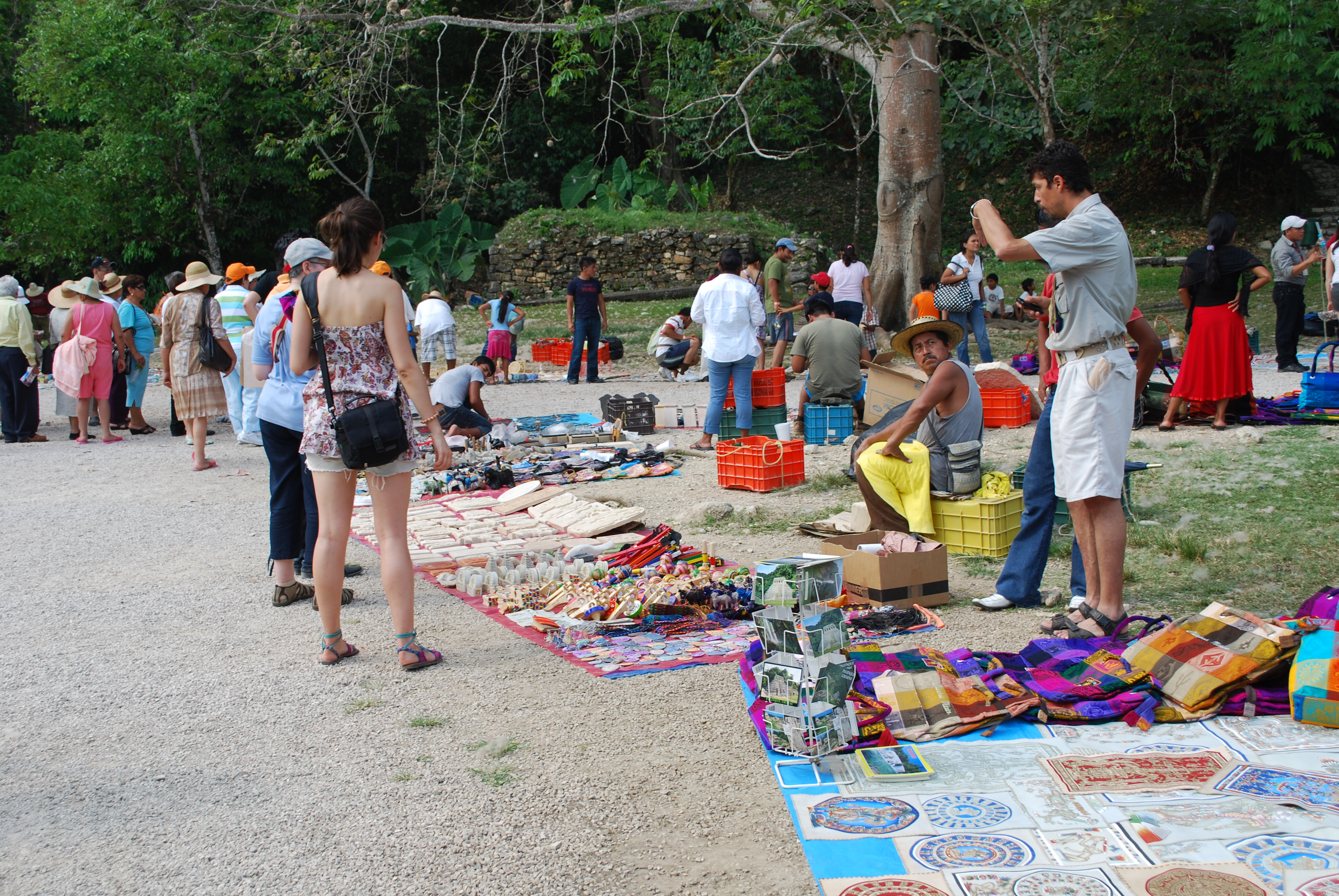
Street traders selling souvenirs (Palenque, Mexico)

== See also ==
Media related to Souvenirs at Wikimedia Commons The dictionary definition of souvenir at Wiktionary

- List of collectibles
- Devotional articles
- Charm bracelet
- Gift shop
- Goss crested china
- Heirloom
- Magic mug
- Memento mori
- Miyagegashi
- Nostalgia industry
- Railroadiana
- Retail
- Snowglobe
