= Dapper Day =

Unofficial biannual event at Disneyland

- Company type: Private
- Industry: Fashion; Events; Accessories
- Founded: 2011
- Founder: Justin Jorgensen
- Number of locations: 3
- Website: dapperday.com

Dapper Day is a fashion-based organization that provides outings and social events unofficially at Disneyland. The events promote vintage-style clothing and aesthetics and are held biannually. The first outing was held in 2011, and Dapper Day has increased in popularity, growing to attract as many as 25,000 participants, with related events now including Walt Disney World and Disneyland Paris. The organization has since expanded to include events at museums and concert halls, along with expos and car shows.

== Origins and history ==
Dapper Day was founded by Justin Jorgensen, who grew up in Fargo, North Dakota. His inspiration was connected to a childhood experience, in which his family travelled to Winnipeg and encountered a store called "Dapper Dan". After taking one of the free promotional pins from the store, Jorgensen asked his mother what the word "dapper" meant, to which she responded, "It means you’re well-dressed – smart and sharp." A self-proclaimed "eccentric" dresser, Jorgensen decided to name his organization "Dapper Day".

Jorgensen said he first thought of the concept of a Disney dress-up day a decade before the first Dapper Day event took place. He was partially inspired by the Walt Disney Imagineering concept design illustrations from the early days of Disneyland. In renderings by John Hench, Herbert Ryman, and other artists, the park's visitors appeared to be dressed in era-appropriate clothing for sophisticated entertainment, such as a night at the opera. The men were drawn in tailored suits, the women were styled in dresses and layered pieces, and the children donned formal jackets and dresses. Many of the attractions imagined in the original design developed into the rides and parks that stand today; Jorgensen wanted to see that full picture (guests included) come to life. Additional reports note that Jorgensen recognized a trend among his friends to "dress down" when frequenting the park, where as usually they would be more dressed up as a matter of personal style. In an pushback against this relaxed park attire, Jorgensen imagined a day dedicated to "dapper" dress where people would not feel uncomfortable expressing their personal style.

The first Dapper Day outing was held in February 2011 in Disneyland as a small function organized by Jorgensen. Over a two-week period he promoted the outing using social media; nearly a hundred people showed up for that first outing. Jorgensen's photographs from the event gained popularity on the Internet, and interest grew for holding another Dapper Day event. In response, Jorgensen decided on a biannual format that would take place in the fall and in the spring. Due to warmer weather conditions, the fall event was originally positioned as a nighttime event, whereas the spring event would take place all day. This model also lends itself to the fashion-centric nature of Dapper Day, mirroring the daytime and evening looks of a fall and spring collection. However due to a string of hot Septembers, the fall outings were eventually moved to the cooler November (with the Disneyland Paris fall outing remaining in September).

The second Dapper Day outing drew an estimated 500 people. In spring 2012, the event had 1,200 participants, and more than tripled its size in the fall of that same year with a crowd of 4,500 people. Just two years after the first outing was held, over 10,000 people came to the park. Following this dramatic increase in participation in the spring, Jorgensen began running the event full-time. At the Disneyland event in spring 2017, an estimated 25,000 people participated. Jorgensen currently works as a creative director and brand consultant.

== Events ==
=== Outings ===
Dapper Day primarily hosts biannual outings in Disneyland, Walt Disney World, and Disneyland Paris each spring and fall. The outings are described as intended to celebrate the tradition of "stepping out in style". Dapper Day states their events "do not aim to recreate a specific period. All sophisticated attire is encouraged from vintage-inspired classics to chic, contemporary looks." Dapper Day outings to Disney parks are not private events but do require park admission as usual. Active and retired military are encouraged to wear their service uniforms or dress blues; however the organizers request that costumes or cosplay be reserved for other events. Although not a strictly vintage event, participants often dress in a style that can be likened to the idea of "their Sunday best", a concept popularized in the 1950s and 1960s. Outing traditions include an afternoon ride on the Mark Twain Riverboat which is referred to as the "Mark Twain Mixer", and an evening ride on the King Arthur Carrousel, referred to as the "Dapper Derby" during the event.

Dapper Day produces a variety of accessories including parasols, folding fans, silk scarves, pocket squares, lapel pins and brooches, with new designs each spring and fall. Dapper Day events are not associated with The Walt Disney Company.

=== Cultural institutions ===
Dapper Day has expanded to include events with cultural institutions such as the Los Angeles County Museum of Art (LACMA), the Los Angeles Opera, and the Natural History Museum of Los Angeles County. Their first event was held July 22, 2016 in partnership with LACMA in celebration of the exhibit Reigning Men: Fashion in Menswear, 1715–2015. Their second event with LACMA, on September 2, 2017, was in conjunction with the exhibit Chagall: Fantasies for the Stage. A third LACMA event was held on June 9, 2018 in celebration of the exhibit David Hockney: 82 Portraits and 1 Still-life.

Dapper Day held their first event on February 21, 2018 with a theatrical production, Dapper Day Visits LA Opera, for the final production of Candide.

=== Additional attractions ===
The Dapper Day Expo is held exclusively in the Disneyland Hotel Exhibit Hall. A variety of vendors sell both vintage and contemporary clothing, as well as style-related products and accessories. Exhibitors and sponsors have included Brooks Brothers, Cirque du Soleil, Walt Disney Pictures, and Simplicity Patterns. Book signings and meet and greets have included Dita Von Teese. Beauty demos have also been offered to style guests in a particular period look. The hall also features a bar, swing bands providing live music, and a pomade parlor for styled hair touch-ups. The 2015 expo also brought an authentic tintype photo booth to the site. A ticket is required for admittance to the two-day-long Expo event.

In 2015, the first Dapper Day Car Show was held in the parking lot of the Disneyland Hotel. Those who wished to register a vehicle for the show were encouraged to "arrive in style" by bringing cars defined by classic style and refined design from all time periods. This was only the second car show to happen at the Disneyland resort after the first in 1959.

At past Disneyland Resort events Dapper Day participants could opt to purchase tickets to a viewing of the Charles Phoenix Retro Disneyland slide show, which features actual slides from guests who visited the park in the early days of Disneyland. The show includes pictures of park-goers dressed in 1950s and 1960s fashions, as well as attractions that have since been retired, such as The House of the Future, the Skyway, Skull Rock, Rainbow Caverns, the Flying Saucers, and Carousel of Progress. Charles Phoenix is an American pop culture humorist and historian whose work is associated with 1950s and 1960s kitsch and Americana.

== See also ==
- Distinguished Gentleman's Ride
- Gay Days at Walt Disney World
- Gentlemen
- Bats Day in the Fun Park
