= Disneyana =

Walt Disney Company ephemera

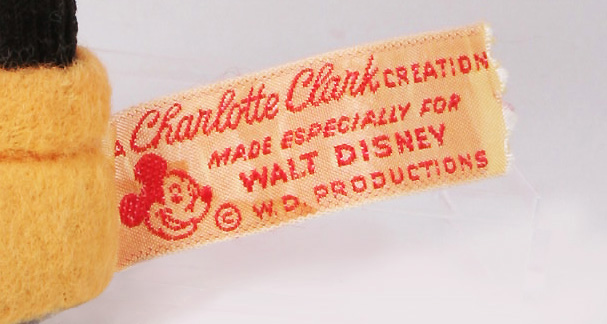
A label from a Mickey Mouse doll made by Charlotte Clark

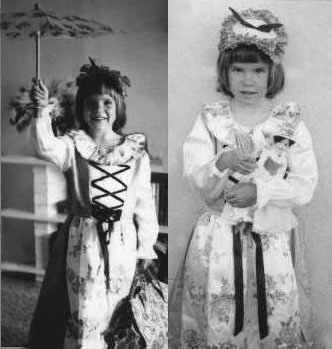
Girl in Mary Poppins costume, 1964

Disneyana is a term for a wide variety of collectible toys, books, animation cels, theme-park souvenirs, ephemera and other items produced and/or licensed by the Walt Disney Company. Examples range from products featuring virtually every Disney character—such as Mickey Mouse, Tinker Bell and others—to vintage stock certificates and company checks bearing the signature of Walt Disney.

The Art Corner was a retail store that operated at Disneyland from 1955 until 1966 which sold souvenirs and Disneyana items. The Walt Disney Company subsequently opened "Disneyana Shops" on Main Street, U.S.A. at both Disneyland and Walt Disney World. High end collectible paintings, prints and figurines can now be found at The Disney Gallery and "Art of Disney Parks" stores.

The ranks of Disneyana enthusiasts grew exponentially throughout the 1980s and 1990s. Today collectors can find Disneyana items for sale through a variety of online auction sites, at regional and international comic shows and other collector events. The "Official Disneyana Convention" and Disney D23 Expo are examples of events produced by the Disney Company that prominently feature collectible items. The company produces many other specialty themed events at their parks and resorts that cater to Disneyana collectors.

== Disneyana Fan Club ==
The Disneyana Fan Club established in 1984 is the oldest existing Disney fan or collector's club. The club identifies itself as "a non-profit organization dedicated to preserving and sharing the rich legacy of Walt Disney. Our common goal is to provide Disneyana enthusiasts of all ages from around the world with news, information, and events that enhance their experience with, and love of, all things Disney." This club has nearly 30 chapters in the United States, Canada, Japan and Australia. They have produced their own conventions and gatherings for over 25 years which pre-date collector events produced by the Disney company.

== History ==
While used informally among collectors in the 1960s and 1970s, the term was brought to prominence with the publication of Disneyana: Walt Disney Collectibles by Cecil Munsey in 1974 (Hawthorn Books Inc.)

The term Disneyana is not trademarked.

== See also ==
- Disney adult
- Disney pin trading
- Disney Vinylmation
- Disney Tsum Tsum
