= Pin trading and collecting =

Culture and practice of trading collectible pins

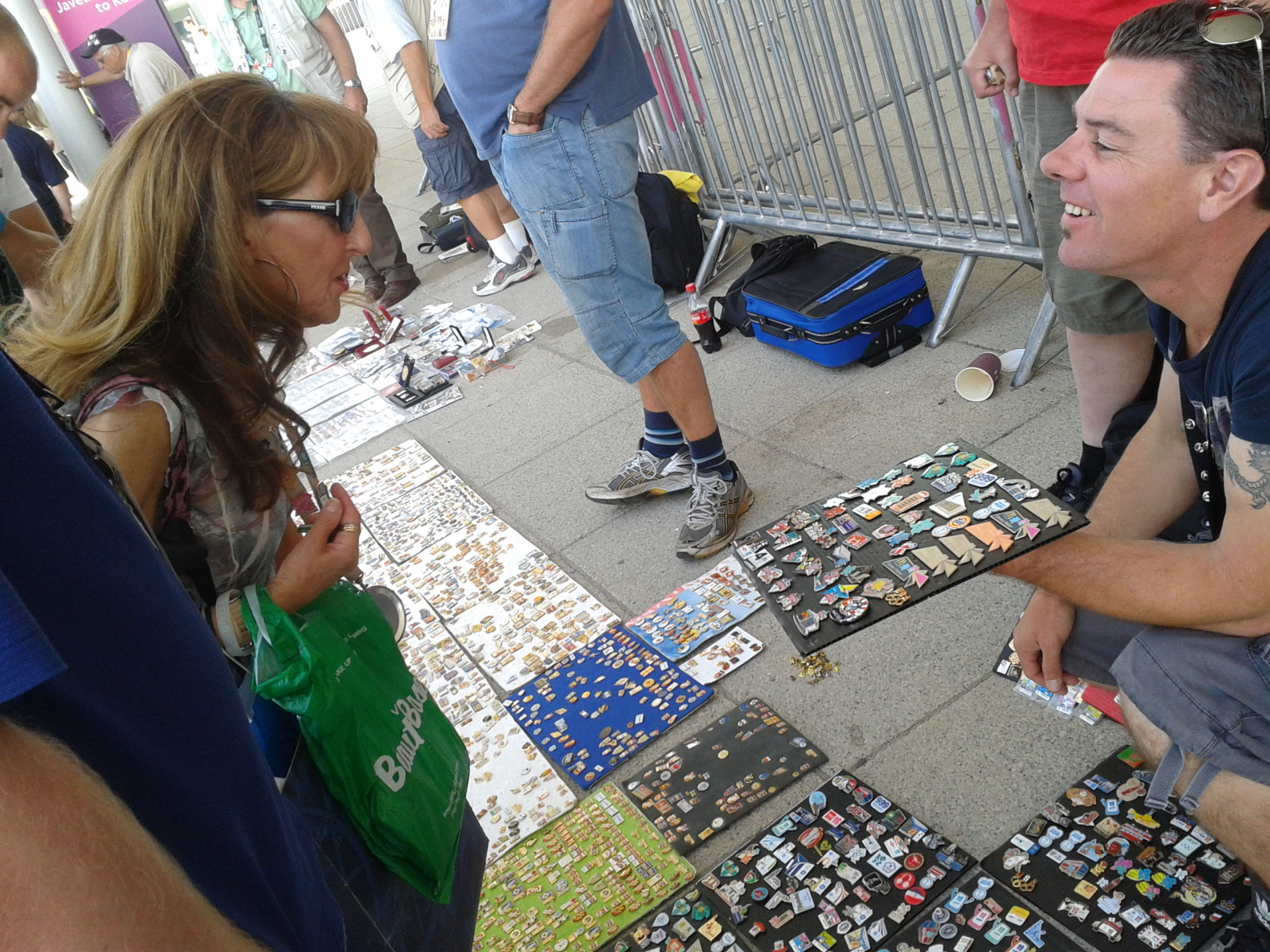
Pin trading at the 2012 London Olympics

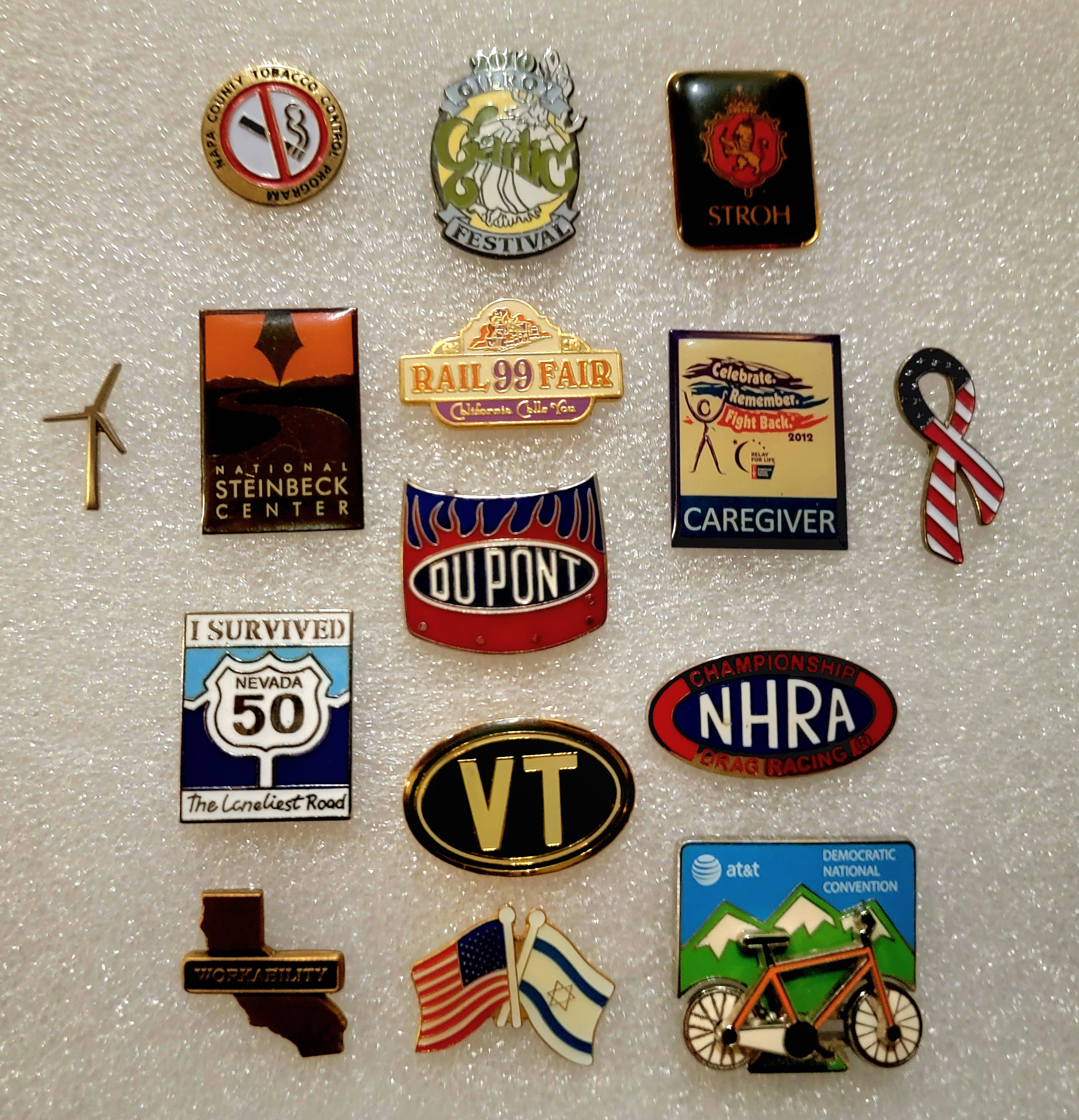
Enamel lapel pins

Pin trading and collecting is the practice of buying, selling, exchanging, and collecting enamel pins (or lapel pins) as a hobby.

Enamel pins are commonly sold as souvenirs, branded merchandise, fashion accessories, and artwork. Trade pins are specifically designed for participants to exchange with one another during an event; through this exchange of pins, participants build unique collections.

Trading often takes place in amusement parks and resorts such as Walt Disney World and Disneyland, SeaWorld, and Universal Resorts, or at sporting events, such as the Olympic Games, Canada Games, and the Little League World Series.

While most pins are typically flat with a glossy finish, there are many types of accessories. Common features include blinking lights, hanging charms (or "danglers"), spinners, and bobbleheads.

Pins are sometimes manufactured in limited editions to increase demand.

== Amusement parks ==
Walt Disney World and Disneyland, SeaWorld, and Universal Resorts all have collectable pins available.

=== Disney ===
Disney Pin Trading
- The current logo with Disneyland Paris branding; variants of the logo use other individual resorts, depending on the region, or Disney Parks as a whole.
- Product type: Lapel pin
- Current owner: Walt Disney Parks, Experiences and Consumer Products
- Country: United States
- Introduced: 1999; 27 years ago
- Markets: Aulani; Disney Cruise Line; Disney Vacation Club; Disneyland Resort; Disneyland Paris; Hong Kong Disneyland Resort; Shanghai Disney Resort; Walt Disney World Resort
- Website: disneypins.com

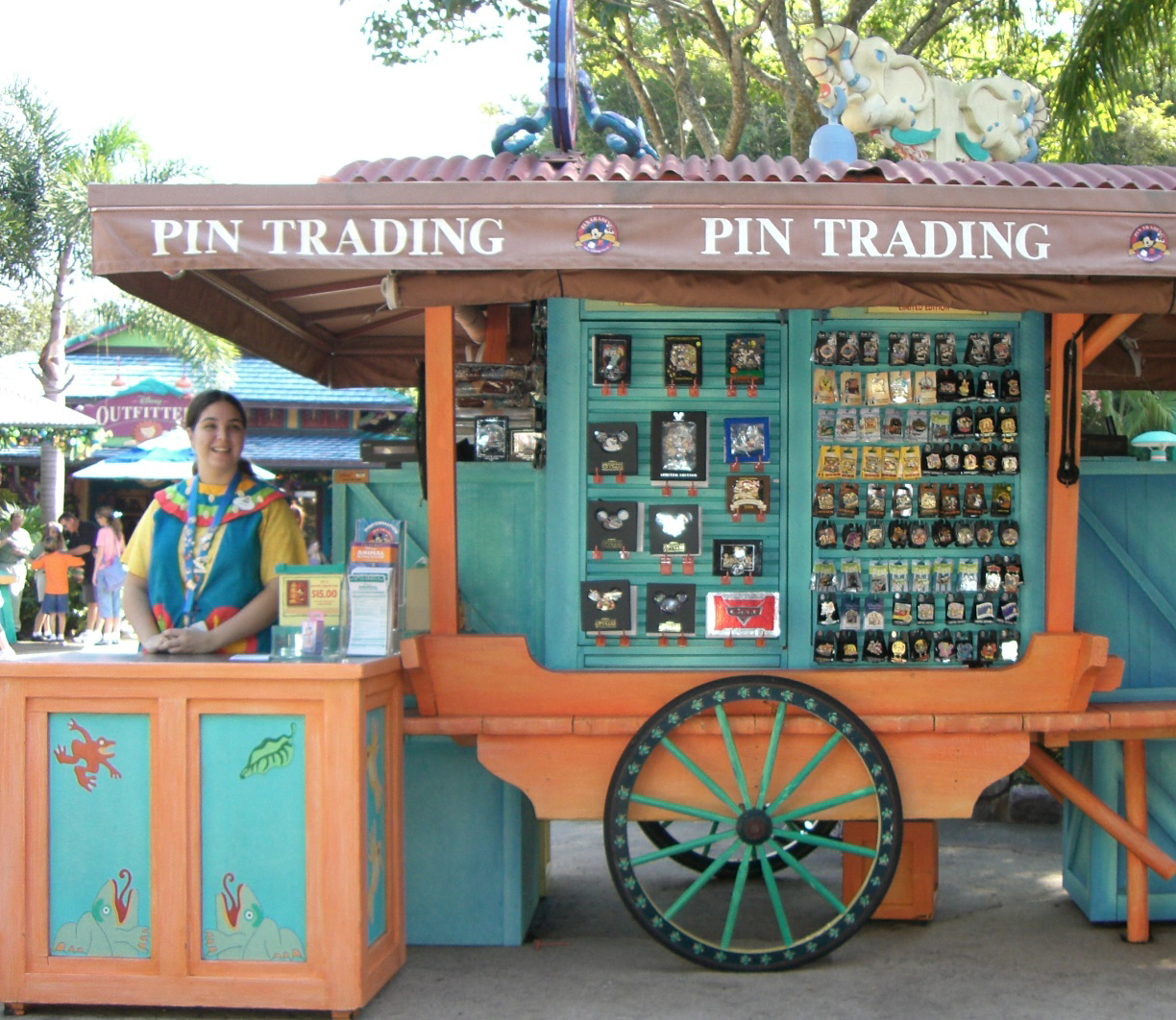
Disney pin trading kiosk at Walt Disney World's Animal Kingdom

Disney fans often engage in the collection, display and trading of pins which are often themed to Disney characters, attractions, ticketed events, parks, hotels and other elements at Disney parks. Limited edition pins are frequently released at special events, movie premieres, pin trading events or to commemorate the opening day of new attractions.

Disney fans often assign subcultural capital to those who have obtained these pins in person, and use them to represent their fan identities. They are framed by Disney as a way to interact within the physical spaces of the parks.

In all Disney resorts, guests as well as merchandise cast members wear pins on lanyards around their necks or on specially designed pin trading bags. Each lanyard contains around a dozen unique pins, and cast members must trade with guests if they are presented with an acceptable pin. The cast members may not decline a particular trade based on preference or rarity of the pin but may decline if the pin is not acceptable or pin trading rules are not being observed. Cast members may have differently colored lanyards that determine what age group can trade for those pins. For example, a green lanyard worn by a cast member means that children twelve years of age and younger only can trade for pins on the lanyard in Walt Disney World Florida. Other than this restriction, people of all ages can enjoy this activity.

Disney discourages guests from partaking in the common practice of acquiring a large number of rare pins to sell on sites such as eBay for significantly inflated prices. Long-term fans largely also oppose this practice, with calls to reduce the number of the same item that can be sold to ten.

==== History ====
Pins have always been present at Disney parks, but it was not until 1999 as part of its Millennium Celebration that Disney Pin Trading at the Walt Disney World Resort was introduced. This was following an Odyssey of the Mind function at the resort in which pins were being traded, inspiring the pin trading idea. The next year, the craze spread to the Disneyland Resort, which has become the home of most Pin Trading events but is most popular in Disney World. Since then, Pin Trading has spread to Aulani, Disneyland Paris, Tokyo Disney Resort, Hong Kong Disneyland Resort and Disney Cruise Line with each location creating their own pins and traditions. The trading of pins was suspended in Tokyo Disney Resort due to pin traders and their pin display mats taking over the park.

==== Etiquette ====
Disney has published a list of rules for pin trading, its 'Trading Pin Etiquette'. Among these tips include:

- For a pin to be tradeable it must be a cloisonné, semi-cloisonné or hard-enamel metal Disney pin or acceptable operating participant pin which represents a specific Disney event, place or location, character or icon.
- Guests may only trade one pin of the same style at a time with a cast member, hand to hand.
- Pins must be traded with the backs attached.
- Refrain from touching another person's pins or lanyard, ask to see the pin so they can bring the pin into closer view.
- The pin that is traded to the cast member cannot be a duplicate of any pin they already have on their lanyard.
- No money can change hands on Disney property in exchange for a pin.

== Sporting events ==
The Canada Games and the Little League World Series both feature long-standing pin trading traditions. The Masters has produced an annual commemorative pin for each year's tournament since at least the 1990s, which included a line of pins themed to the course's holes.

The hats given out to selected players during the 2025 NFL draft included pins referencing each team's home city.

=== Olympic Games ===
The Olympic Games has a long tradition of pin trading, sometimes called the "unofficial sport" of the Games, which is open to all. Each year, between 5,000 and 6,000 new designs of pin are created for the games, usually by nations, teams, brand sponsors, media organizations, and the International Olympic Committee (IOC) itself. They are seen as a "currency of friendship", creating a barter economy, and allow athletes to bond despite speaking different languages. Those who engage in the hobby are often nicknamed "pinheads".

Pins are often worn by athletes on their lanyards or accreditation badges to indicate a willingness to trade. Their value can range from very little to thousands of dollars, depending on their age, material, special features, and frequency. Smaller delegations, particularly those from Africa, may only bring a few hundred pins, causing them to be more valuable. Pins from countries that have recently changed their names are also subject to higher demand, as are pins from cancelled Olympic Games and those created for politicians.

Rules of etiquette for trading have been established by the International Association of Olympic Collectors (AICO), and a US based collectors' club for the hobby, Olympin, is recognized by the IOC and had 500 members as of 2022, featuring a compendium of pins on its website.

==== History ====
The use of pin badges at the Olympics began during the 1896 Summer Olympics in Athens, during which three designs of pin were produced; small cardboard disks were worn by judges, athletes and officials, in blue, pink and red respectively. Winning athletes were presented with cloth pins which featured competing countries' national emblems.

By the 1904 Summer Olympics in St. Louis, pins for the Games were being made from metal. Eight countries created personalised pins at the 1908 Summer Olympics in London, including the United States, Norway and Hungary. Commercial pins were sold for the first time at the 1912 Summer Olympics in Stockholm to fund the event. The introduction of the Olympic Village at the 1924 Summer Olympics in Paris caused athletes from different nations to mix more easily, leading to pin trading as a form of goodwill between nations. For the 1936 Summer Olympics and 1936 Winter Olympics in Nazi Germany, organisers manufactured nearly one million pins for propaganda and to cover the cost of hosting the Games, causing a significant increase in pin production.

The public first became involved in trading pins at the 1976 Summer Olympics in Montreal, and this grew at the 1980 Summer Olympics in Moscow. Olympin was formed following the Winter Olympics at Lake Placid in 1982. The 1984 Summer Olympics in Los Angeles, according to many pin traders at the time, was a pivotal event for pin trading, as it marked the beginning of sponsors' use of pins to promote their brands. London Pins estimated that at those Games, there were "17,000,000 pins in over 1,300 designs". The first official pin trading center was established at the 1988 Winter Olympics in Calgary, sponsored by Coca-Cola, which began manufacturing its own pins to trade that year.

Around 500,000 people visited Olympic pin trading sites at the 1992 Summer Olympics in Barcelona. For the 1994 Winter Olympics in Lillehammer, a local company produced and sold 18 million pins, over three times the population of its host country of Norway, with the organization committee obtaining US$18,000,000 in royalties. 1.5 million people visited trading sites at the 1996 Summer Olympics in Atlanta, following which four pin traders including Sid Marantz purchased a warehouse in Colorado which had been home to the United States Olympic & Paralympic Committee and held 750,000 unsold pins. They kept around 120,000 and sold the rest to other collectors.

At the 1998 Winter Olympics in Nagano, organizers did not produce enough pins, leading to a trading frenzy in which some traders earned US$40,000 within days. Serena Williams began collecting pins at the 2000 Summer Olympics in Sydney after failing to qualify that year.

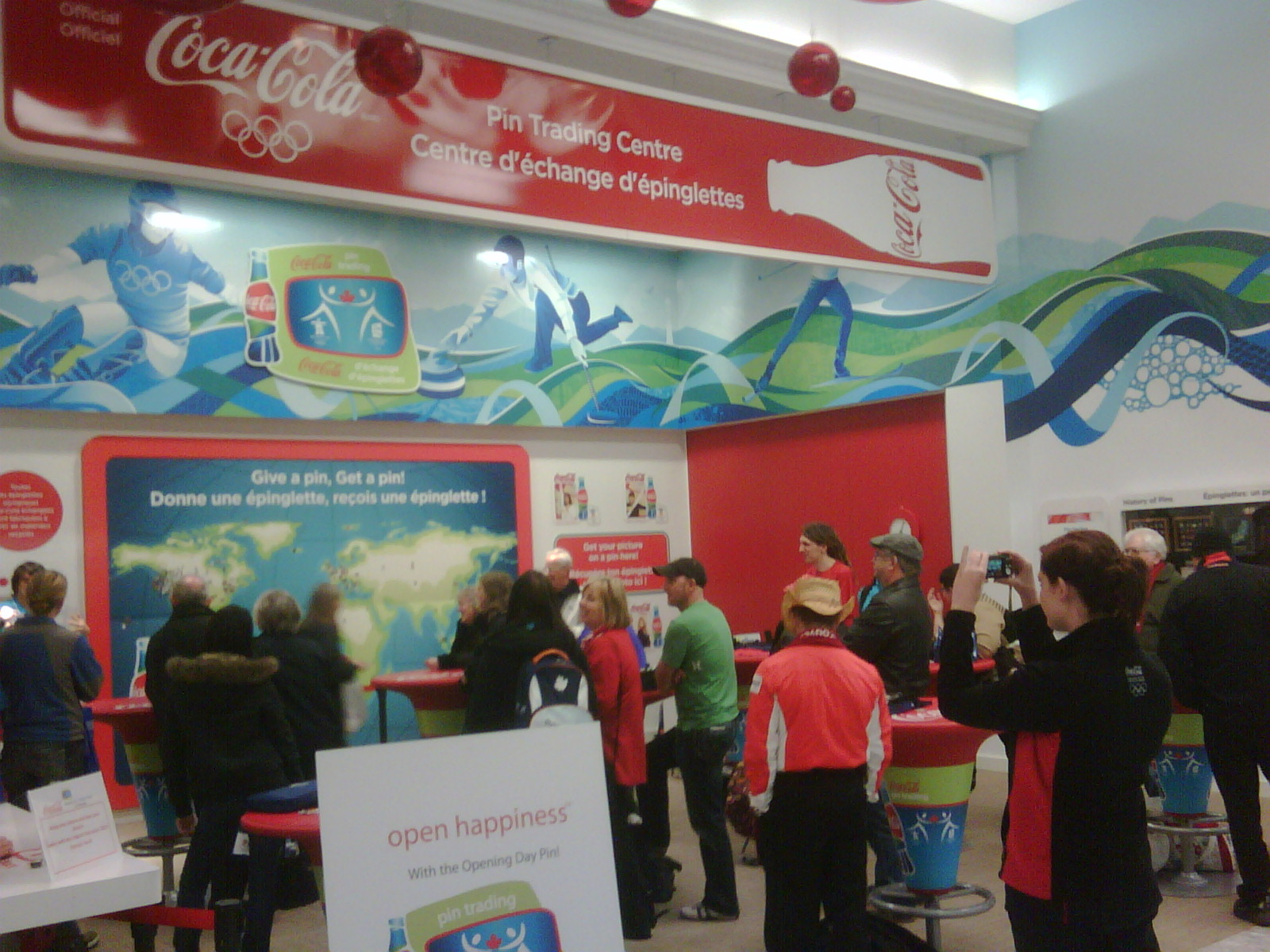
Coca-Cola Olympic Pin Trading Centre at the 2010 Vancouver Olympics

For the 2012 Summer Olympics, the London Organising Committee of the Olympic and Paralympic Games stated they would produce 2,012 different pin designs. Coca-Cola Pin Trading Centers were set up at the Olympic Park as well as Hyde Park which featured maps of the world on which people could place pins, and London Pins took to organising information about that year's pins on its website. The most coveted pin from the 2012 games, according to Wired, was a pin created by a Japanese press group which featured the Pokémon character Pikachu. Others in high demand were Hungary's athletes pin, made by the Hungarian Mint to resemble pins from the country's past, and a strawberry pin to commemorate the tennis final, evoking strawberries eaten at the Wimbledon Championships.

Pin trading was less prevalent at the 2014 Winter Olympics in Sochi due to fewer regulars attending the Games. Williams obtained a North Korea pin at the 2016 Summer Olympics in Rio de Janeiro which she stated she "would never, ever, ever trade". Gymnast Aly Raisman stated that she tried "to trade pins with the cute boys if [she could] find them, to be honest."

In 2020, as a result of the announcement that no outside spectators would be allowed into Tokyo for the 2020 Summer Olympics, which took place in 2021, following the outbreak of the COVID-19 pandemic, pin trading was halted. Around 250 pin traders had prepared for the Games, and organizers had already made 600 different officially licensed pins to be sold in 12 souvenir stores around Tokyo. Pin-related promotions were planned featuring pins representing Japan's 47 prefectures. It was speculated by traders that pins from these Olympics would be worth very little due to supply dwarfing demand. In an attempt to continue the tradition digitally, non-fungible tokens (NFTs) were sold in place of the pins, with mascot-inspired designs and digitally animated posters from previous Olympics, as well as NFT versions of pins from past Games dating back to the Athens games in 1896. The NFTs were sold in packs ranging in price from $9-$499 per pack, a peer-to-peer marketplace was planned to facilitate trading and buying, and the NFTs were also planned to be available to earn through playing Olympic Games Tokyo 2020 - The Official Video Game. The 2022 Winter Olympics in Beijing also prevented contact between attendees, stifling any trading.

For the 2024 Summer Olympics in Paris, pin trading made a large resurgence as a result of the inclusion of spectators, and trading was encouraged by the Games' social media accounts, as well as an Official Olympic Collectors Area hosted by the IAOC. The Refugee Olympic Team produced its first ever design after debuting in 2016. During the opening ceremony, Stephen Curry traded pins aboard the Team USA boat, and the Spanish and British teams traded pins by throwing them across the Seine to each other's boats. Snoop Dogg, who was attending as a spectator and commentator, gave out his own pin which featured himself blowing smoke rings in the colours of the Olympic rings in front of the Eiffel Tower, and was credited with encouraging younger athletes to engage in trading. Simone Biles also gave out a custom pin, which took the form of a gold heart and became one of the most wanted that year. The Dutch delegation gave out a pin in the shape of a pair of orange clogs, which was in high demand from attendees. As a result of the Gaza war, pins from the eight Palestinian athletes were popular. Serena Williams described herself as a "first-class pin collector", and Andy Murray also engaged heavily in trading, obtaining one of Biles' own pins. Ilona Maher, Caroline Wozniacki, Coco Gauff, Alena Saili, Tysha Ikenasio, Jah-Nhai Perinchief, Hazel Ouwehand, Imogen Grant, Jasmine Schofield and Naomi Osaka shared their collections on social media. US fencers Lee Kiefer and Nick Itkin competed with each other to collect the most pins.

The tradition continued at the 2026 Winter Games in Italy. YesMilano, in order to promote the city of Milan, distributed free pins (250 each morning) at various locations. An official pin trading area, sponsored by Warner Brothers, was the first at the Games since 2018. Official IOC-branded pins were produced by Honav.

== Other ==
The Kentucky Derby Festival has created an annual "Pegasus Pin" since the early 1970s. The yearly Tamworth Country Music Festival in Tamworth, New South Wales, Australia sells a different pin on each day of the festival.

Odyssey of the Mind features a long-standing pin trading tradition.

The Pathfinder Club's Chosen International Camporee, held once every five years, sees attendees bring hundreds of pins to trade.

Singapore's Ministry of Culture, Community and Youth produced a set of six collectable pins to celebrate the country's 60th year of independence in 2025.

Among stores and restaurants, Hard Rock Cafe sells a range of pins.

Pins are also released as merchandise for movies and TV shows; examples include Game of Thrones and KPop Demon Hunters. Brands may offer pins as rewards, during promotions, and as part of loyalty programs.

== See also ==
- Campaign button
- Disneyana
- Lapel pin
- Pin-back button
- Vinylmation
