= Cartoon controversy =

A number of controversies have arisen as the result of the publishing of cartoons in magazines or newspapers:

- Jyllands-Posten Muhammad cartoons controversy, 2005
- Iran newspaper cockroach cartoon controversy, 2006
- Rakyat Merdeka dingo cartoon controversy, a controversy over the 2006 West Papuan refugee crisis
- 2007 Bangladesh cartoon controversy
- Lars Vilks Muhammad drawings controversy
- Rape of Lady Justice cartoon controversy, 2008

== See also ==
- Cartoon war (disambiguation)
- Political cartoon
