= Cartoon Wars =

Cartoon Wars may refer to:

- A two-part episode of the American animated sitcom South Park.
  - "Cartoon Wars Part I"
  - "Cartoon Wars Part II"
- Cartoon Wars (video game), an iOS video game

== See also ==
- Cartoon war (disambiguation)
