= Cartoon war =

A cartoon war occurs when two or more parties knowingly or unknowingly spread animated propaganda that intimidates the other side and may refer to:

- Jyllands-Posten Muhammad cartoons controversy, cartoons that depict a rendition of Muhammad
- American propaganda during World War II
- Propaganda in Japan during the Second Sino-Japanese War and World War II

== See also ==
- Cartoon Wars (disambiguation)
