= Rape of Lady Justice cartoon controversy =

Response to a Zapiro political cartoon

The cartoon that started the controversy. Entitled the Rape of Lady Justice, the cartoon shows Jacob Zuma (far left) opening his pants whilst his political allies hold down a woman representing Lady Justice. It strongly implies that Zuma is about to rape Lady Justice with the assistance of his political allies.

The Rape of Lady Justice cartoon controversy occurred in response to a cartoon drawn by the satirical cartoonist Zapiro and published in the South African newspaper the Sunday Times on 7 September 2008. The cartoon, entitled "The Rape of Lady Justice", depicts Jacob Zuma – then the president of the African National Congress (ANC), and later the President of South Africa – unbuttoning his pants whilst four men hold down a woman representing Lady Justice, implying that Zuma is about to rape Lady Justice with their assistance and encouragement. The four men were key Zuma supporters in the ANC-led Tripartite Alliance: from left to right, Julius Malema (then leader of the ANC Youth League), Gwede Mantashe (then ANC Secretary General), Blade Nzimande (General Secretary of the South African Communist Party), and Zwelinzima Vavi (General Secretary of the Congress of South African Trade Unions). The cartoon depicts Mantashe telling Zuma to "Go for it, boss!"

== Political context ==
In 2006, Zuma had been controversially acquitted on rape charges. The showerhead which Zuma appears under in the cartoon is a regular feature of Zapiro cartoons and alludes to Zuma's testimony during the trial about post-coital showers, which he incorrectly claimed reduced the chances of HIV/AIDS transmission.

The cartoon was published during court proceedings concerning criminal charges against Zuma: he faced twelve fraud charges, two corruption charges, and one charge each of racketeering and money laundering, all in relation to the 1999 Arms Deal. A criminal conviction would prevent Zuma from standing as a candidate in the 2009 presidential election. In September, Judge Chris Nicholson of the Pietermaritzburg High Court was presiding over a legal challenge lodged by Zuma, which sought to declare the charges against him invalid and unconstitutional, and which had delayed his trial, initially scheduled to begin in August. In the months leading up to the verdict, Zuma's political allies made numerous public threats and ad hominem attacks against the judiciary. Malema and Vavi stated that they would "kill for Zuma" if the case went ahead whilst Mantashe called the Constitutional Court judges counter-revolutionaries and stated that anarchy would break out in South Africa. Nzimande stated that the trial would threaten South Africa's political stability. On 12 September, the week after the cartoon was published, Judge Nicholson set aside the charges on procedural grounds.

== Aftermath ==
The cartoon was criticised for a number of different reasons. Some critics argued that the cartoon trivialised rape in a country that is believed to have one of the highest incidences of the crime in the world. Others criticised the cartoon as promoting a South African stereotype that depicts black males as sexual predators. Zuma's supporters argued that it was an assault on his personal dignity and was slanderous. A formal complaint against the cartoon was lodged with the Human Rights Commission.

Shortly after the cartoon's publication Zuma sued the cartoon's author, Zapiro, for R4 million due to the alleged damage it caused his reputation and an additional R1 million for injury to his dignity. Zuma reduced his claims against Zapiro to R100,000 and a public apology. In 2012 Zuma withdrew his lawsuit against Zapiro.

The cartoon was rated as one of the 15 Historic Cartoons That Changed The World by BuzzFeed in 2013 and one of the 5 most controversial works of art depicting Jacob Zuma by the Sunday Times. Zapiro has stated that out of all the cartoons he has drawn in his career this one is his favourite.
