= American propaganda during World War II =

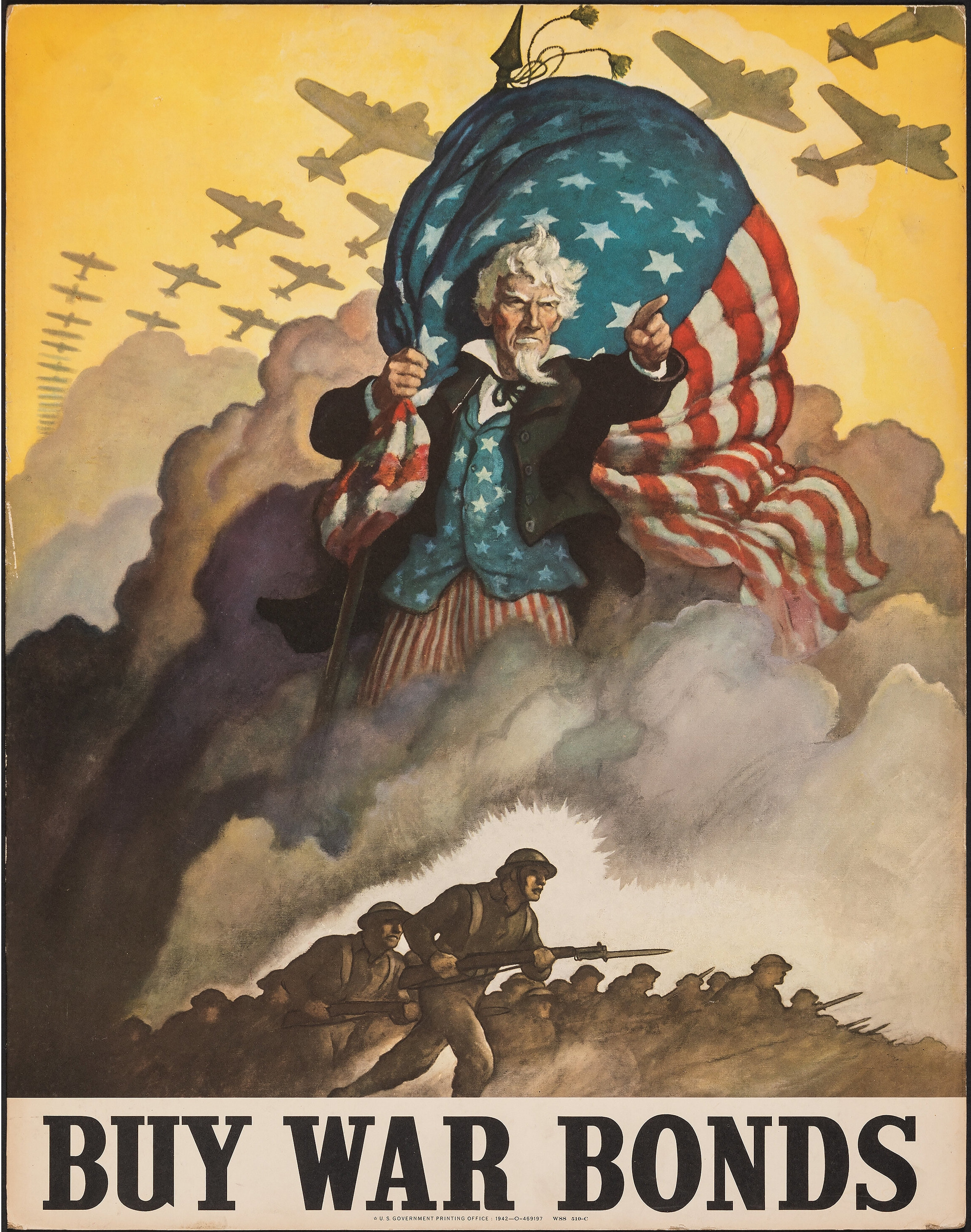
An American propaganda poster promoting war bonds, depicting Uncle Sam leading the United States Armed Forces into battle

During American involvement in World War II (1941–45), propaganda was used to increase support for the war and commitment to an Allied victory. Using a vast array of media, propagandists instigated hatred for the enemy and support for America's allies, urged greater public effort for war production and victory gardens, persuaded people to save some of their material so that more material could be used for the war effort, and sold war bonds.

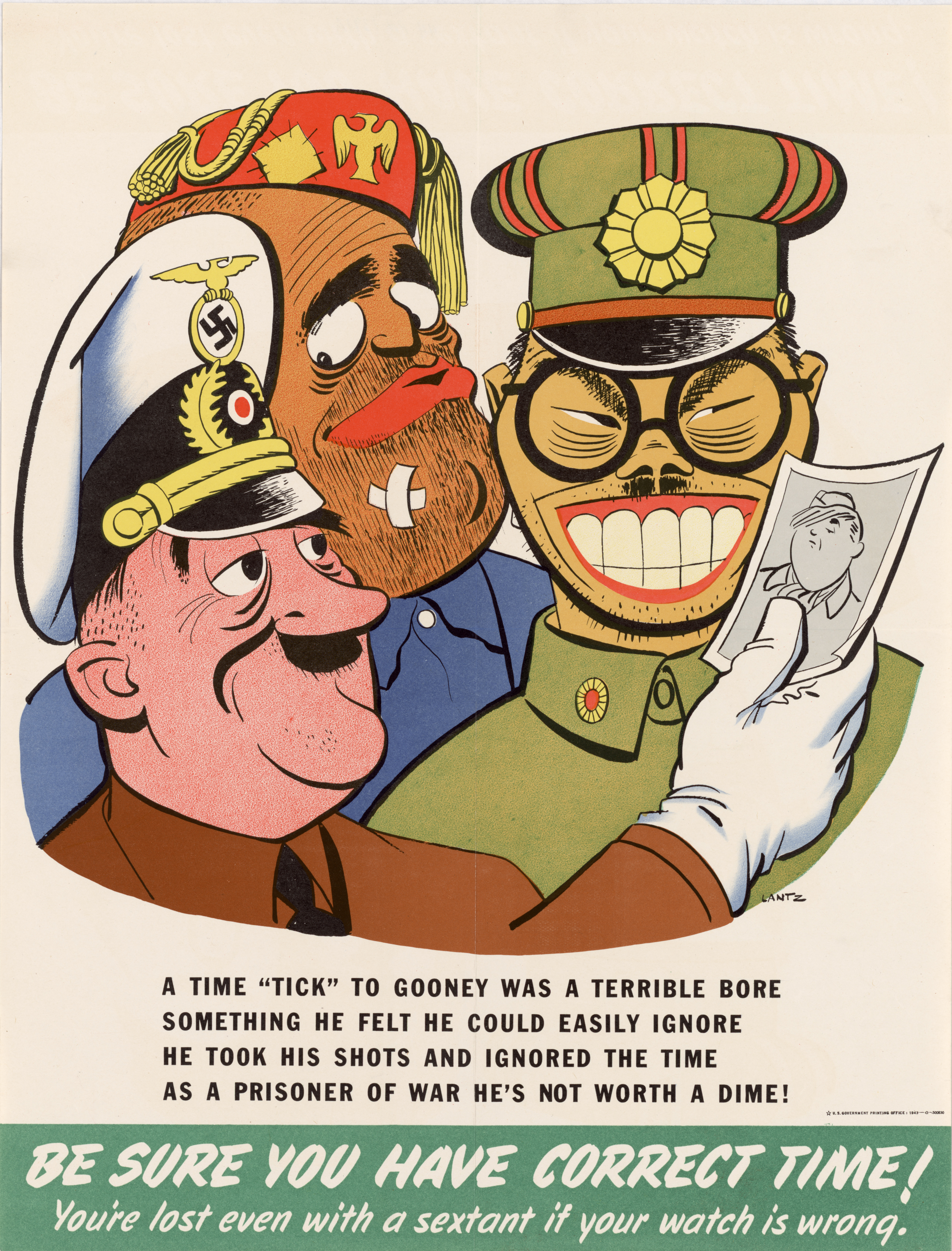
"BE SURE YOU HAVE CORRECT TIME!" This poster, intended for navigation students, combines instruction with caricatures of Axis leaders Adolf Hitler, Benito Mussolini, and Hideki Tojo

Patriotism became the central theme of advertising throughout the war, as large scale campaigns were launched to sell war bonds, promote efficiency in factories, reduce ugly rumors, and maintain civilian morale. The war consolidated the advertising industry's role in American society, deflecting earlier criticism. The leaders of the Axis powers were portrayed as cartoon caricatures, in order to make them appear foolish and idiotic. The American government produced posters, films, and radio programs as much as it produced ammunition and weapons of war. In fact, posters, films, books, and animations were weapons to capture the hearts and minds of American citizens. This was all designed to create a society that supported the war.

== Campaign ==
At first, the government was reluctant to engage in propaganda campaigns, but pressure from the media, the business sector and advertisers who wanted direction persuaded the government to take an active role. Even so, the government insisted that its actions were not propaganda, but a means of providing information. These efforts were slowly and haphazardly formed into a more unified propaganda effort, although never to the level of World War I.

In 1942, President Franklin D. Roosevelt created the Office of War Information (OWI). This mid-level agency joined a host of other wartime agencies, including the War and State Departments, in the dissemination of war information and propaganda. Officials at OWI used numerous tools to communicate to the American public. These included Hollywood movie studios, radio stations and printing presses.

The Writers' War Board was privately organized for the purposes of propaganda and often acted as liaison between the government and the writers. Many of the writers involved regarded their efforts as superior to governmental propaganda, as they regarded their material as bolder and more responsive than governmental efforts. However, the writers both responded to official requests and initiated their own campaigns.

In 1944 (lasting until 1948), prominent U.S. policy makers launched a domestic propaganda campaign aimed at convincing the U.S. public to accept a harsh peace for the German people. One method used in this campaign was an attempt to remove the commonly held view that the German people and the Nazi party were separate entities. A key participant in this campaign was the Writers' War Board, which was closely associated with the Roosevelt administration.

== Media ==
=== Posters ===
The United States used posters to advertise, and produced more propaganda posters than any other country fighting in World War II. Almost 200,000 different designs were printed during the war.

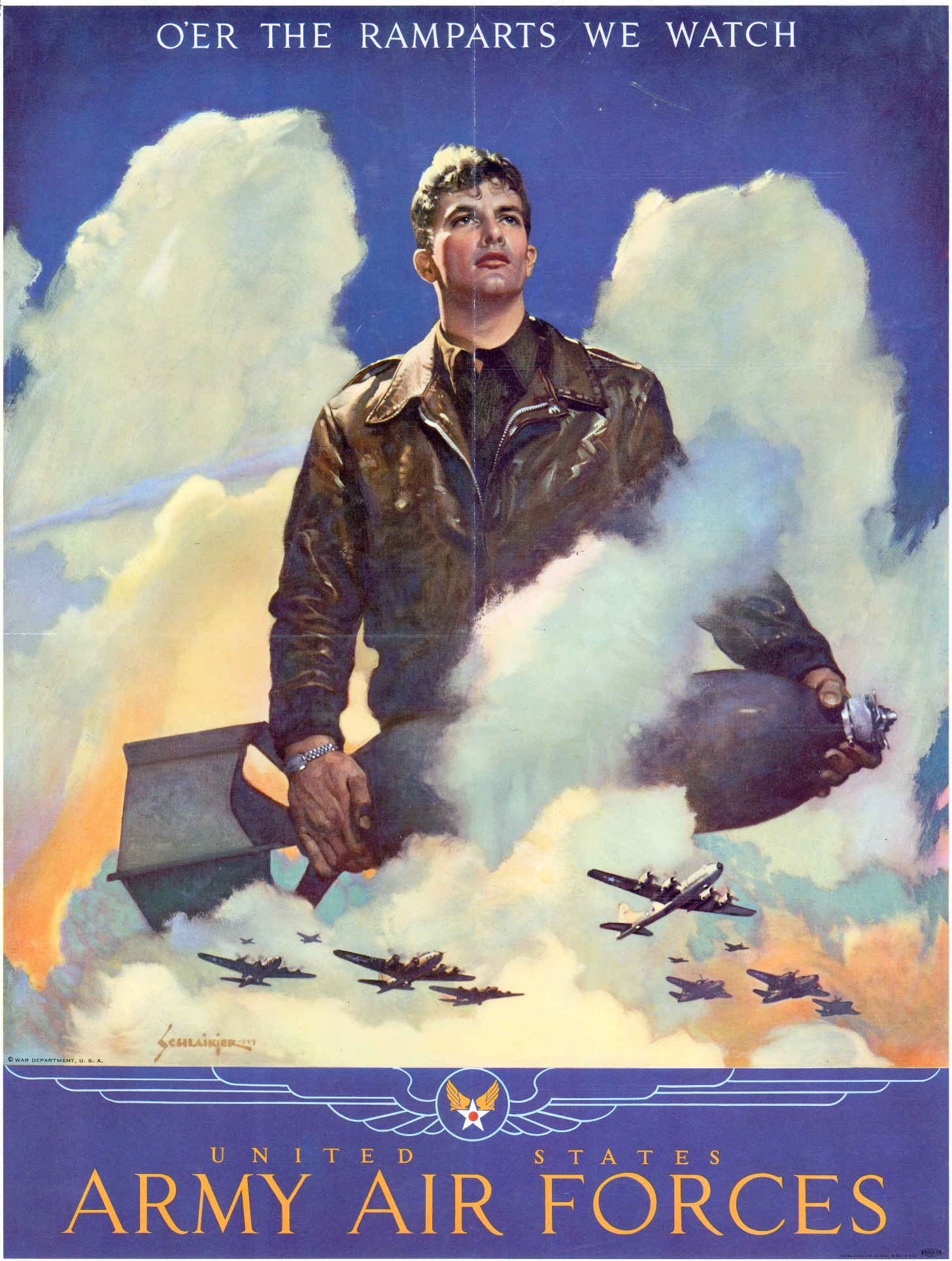
"O'er The Ramparts We Watch", an oft-reproduced poster promoting the United States Army Air Forces

These posters used a number of themes to encourage support for the war, including conservation, production, recruiting, home efforts and secrecy. Posters were usually placed in areas without paid advertisements. The most common areas were post offices, railroad stations, schools, restaurants and retail stores. Smaller posters were printed for the windows of private homes and apartment buildings. These were places where other propaganda media couldn't be used.

The Office of War Information (OWI) Bureau of Graphics was the government agency in charge of producing and distributing propaganda posters. The main distinction between United States poster propaganda and that of British and other allied propaganda was that the U.S. posters stayed mostly positive in their messages. The United States posters focused on duty, patriotism and tradition, whereas those of other countries focused on fueling the people's hatred for the enemy. The positive messages on U.S. posters were used to increase production on the home front instead of insuring that the "money raised was not lost." American posters rarely used images of war casualties, and even battlefield scenes became less popular, and were replaced by commercial images to satisfy the "consumer" need for the war.

The war posters were not designed by the government, but by artists who received no compensation for their work. Government agencies held competitions for artists to submit their designs, allowing the government to increase the number of designs that it could choose from.

=== Advertising ===
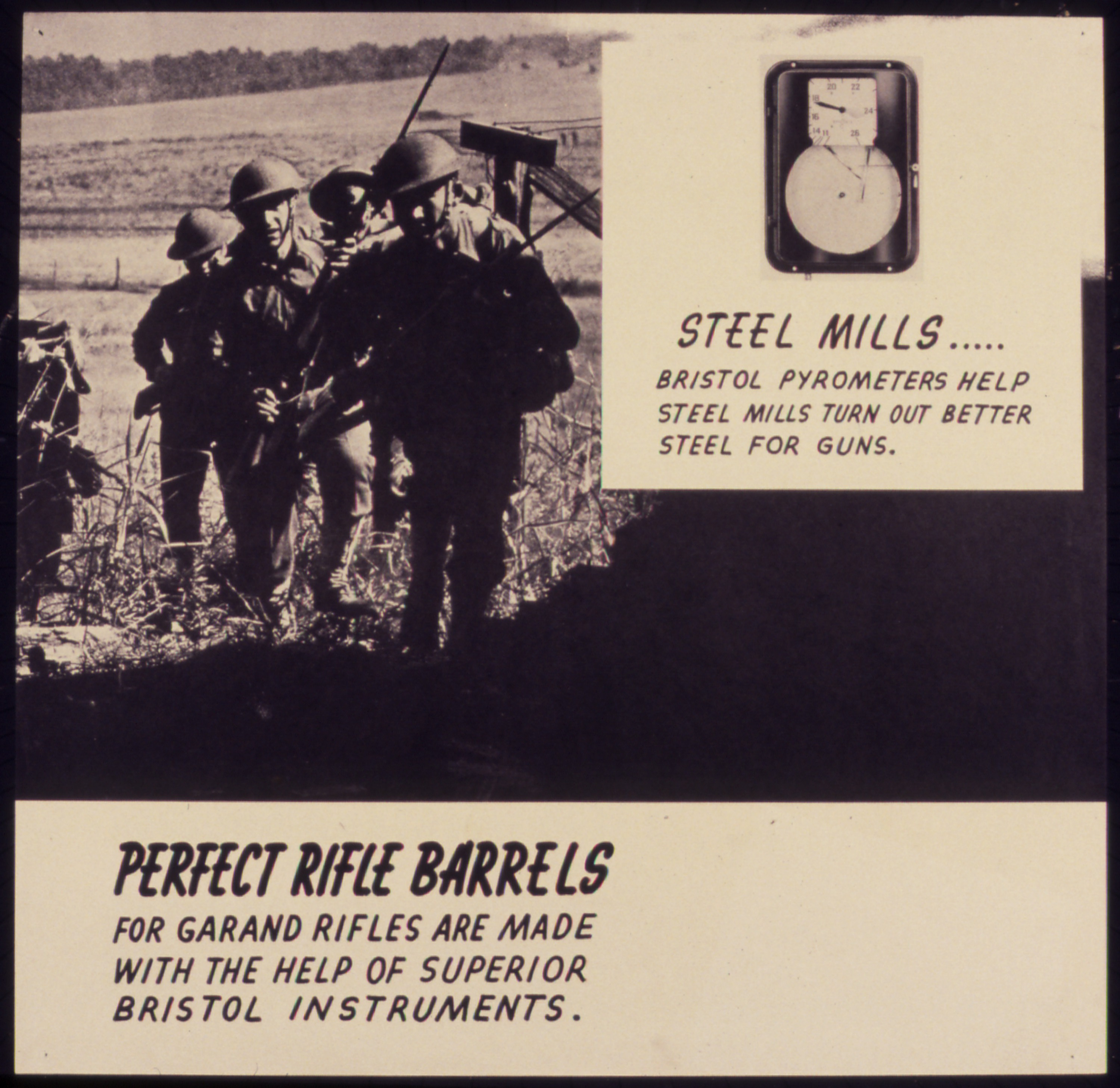
A Bristol Pyrometer Company advertisement highlighting the use of the company's pyrometer in manufacturing barrels for the M1 Garand.

Companies ran advertising supporting the war. This helped keep their names before the public although they had no products to sell, and they were allowed to treat this advertising as a business expense. The War Advertising Council helped supervise such efforts. Car manufacturers and other producers that retooled for the war effort took out ads depicting their efforts. Other companies connected their products in some way with the war. For example, Lucky Strike claimed the change from green to white in its packaging was to save bronze for weapons, and, as a result, saw its sales skyrocket. Food and soft drink companies such as Coca-Cola depicted their products being consumed by defense workers and members of the armed forces. Many commercial ads also urged the purchase of war bonds.

Much of the war effort was defined by advertising, and the armed forces overseas preferred magazines with full ads rather than a slimmed down version without them.

=== Comic books and cartoons ===
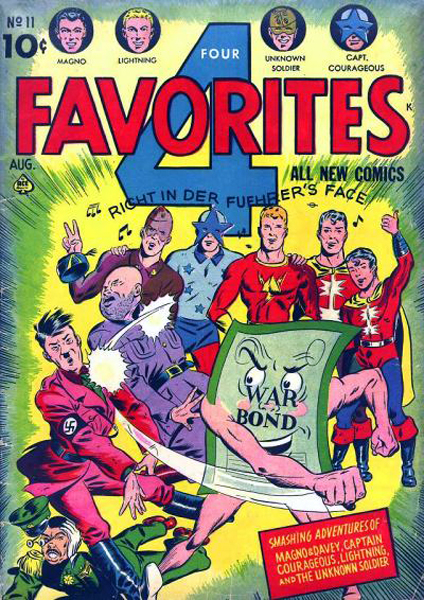
Cover of the August 1943 issue of the Four Favorites showing an anthropomorphized war bond beating Tojo, Hitler, and Mussolini. The heroes on the cover are shown singing Spike Jones' hit song "Der Fuehrer's Face".

Just as is done today, editorial cartoonists sought to sway public opinion. For example, Dr. Seuss supported interventionism even before the attack on Pearl Harbor.

Comic strips, such as Little Orphan Annie and Terry and the Pirates, introduced war themes into their stories. Even before the war, sabotage and subversion were common motifs in action-oriented strips.

Many superheroes were shown combating Axis spies or activities in America and elsewhere. A comic book depicting Superman attacking the German Westwall was attacked in an issue of Das Schwarze Korps, the SS weekly newspaper, with the Jewish origin of creator Jerry Siegel given prominent attention. Similarly, the Marvel comics superhero Captain America is seen punching Hitler, while simultaneously deflecting bullets from Nazi soldiers, on the cover page of Captain America Comics #1.

In 1944, after being praised by Ernie Pyle, Bill Mauldin's cartoons were syndicated in the United States. This effort was supported by the War Department due to Mauldin's grimmer depiction of everyday military life in his cartoons. Mauldin's cartoons not only publicized the efforts of the ground forces, but they made the war appear bitter and onerous, helping convince Americans that victory would not be easy. While his cartoons omitted carnage, they showed the difficulty of war through his depiction of the soldiers' disheveled appearance, and sad, vacant eyes. This helped produce continued support for the troops, by conveying the hardships of their daily experiences.

=== Leaflets ===
Leaflets and newspapers could be dropped from aircraft, sometimes to populations in locations unreachable by other means; for example, when the population was afraid or unable to listen to foreign radio broadcasts. As such, the United States extensively used leaflets to convey short informational tidbits. In fact, one squadron of B-17 bombers was entirely dedicated to this purpose. Leaflets were also used against enemy forces, providing "safe conduct passes" that enemy troops could use to surrender as well as counterfeit ration books, stamps and currency. The very scale of the leaflet operations had its effect on enemy morale, showing that the American armament industry was so productive that planes could be diverted for this purpose.

The use of leaflets against Japanese troops was of little effect. Many civilians in Okinawa discounted pamphlets declaring that prisoners would not be harmed. By the time American B-29 Superfortress bombers reached the Japanese home islands and intensely firebombed industrial and civilian centers with impunity, the leaflets had improved, providing "advance notice" of bombings that ensured the leaflets were read avidly despite prohibitions. These pamphlets were dropped in many targeted Japanese cities, declaring they had no wish to harm civilians but rather only strategic targets such as military bases and defense industries, encouraging them to flee the cities to avoid the bombings, and that the bombings could be stopped by demanding new leaders who would end the war. After the atomic attacks, more pamphlets were dropped, warning that the Americans had an even more powerful explosive at their disposal equal to that of 2,000 B-29 bombers carrying thousands of conventional bombs. When the Japanese government subsequently offered to surrender, the U.S. continued to drop pamphlets, telling the Japanese people of their government's offer and that they had a right to know the terms.

The American Historical Association's G.I. Roundtable Series of pamphlets was used to ease transition to the post-war world.

=== Radio ===
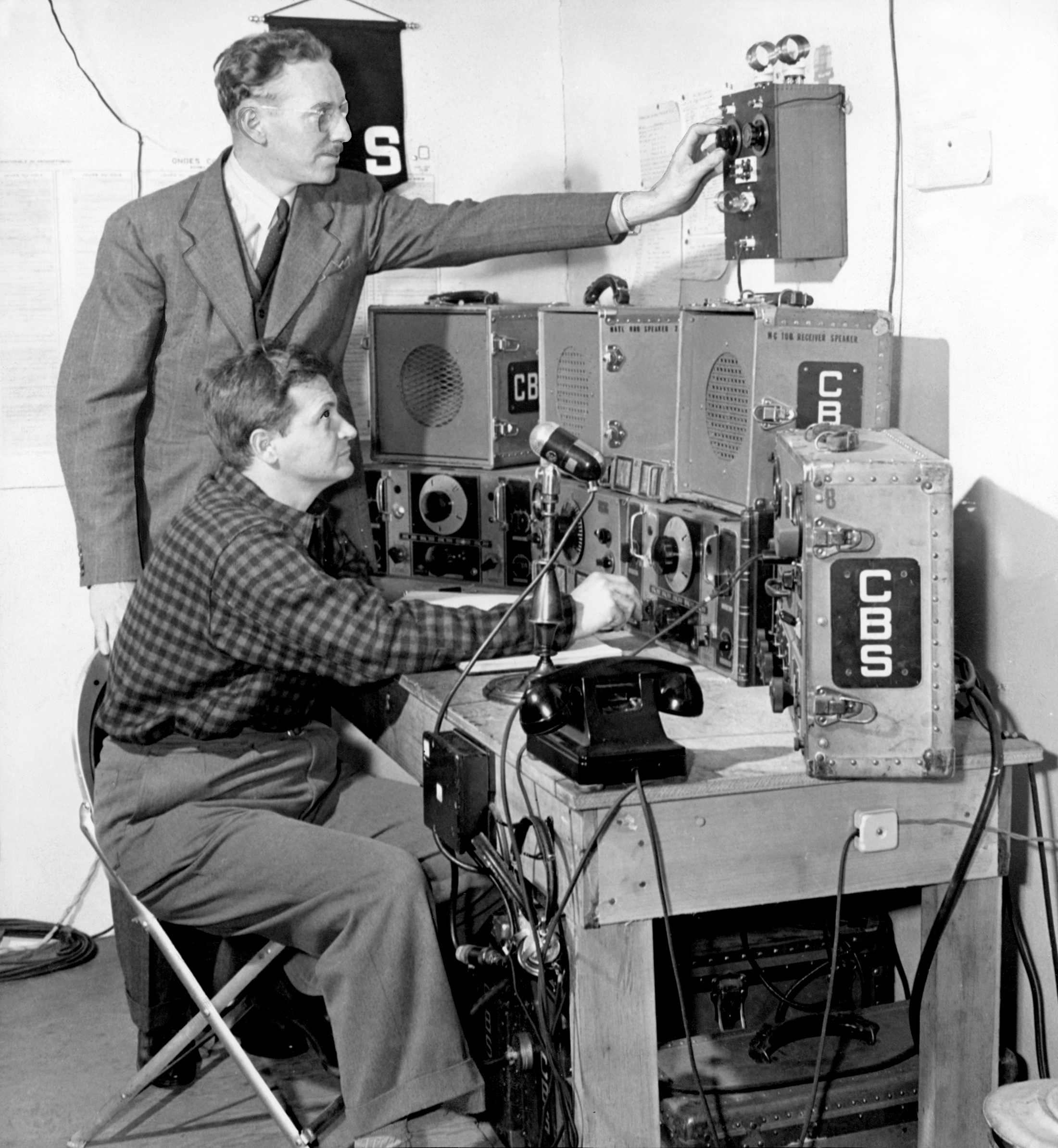
CBS Radio staff recording propaganda broadcasts from Europe in 1941

In the United States, radio was so widely used for propaganda that it greatly exceeded the use of other media that was typically used against other nations. President Roosevelt's fireside chats are an excellent example of this use of radio. In February 1942, Norman Corwin's This is War series was broadcast throughout the country and by shortwave throughout the world. Other significant uses of radio overseas includes messages to the Italian Navy, which persuaded it to surrender. CBS Radio's counterpropaganda series Our Secret Weapon (1942–43), featuring writer Rex Stout representing Freedom House, monitored Axis shortwave radio propaganda broadcasts and rebutted the most entertaining lies of the week.

In 1942 and 1943 Orson Welles created two CBS Radio series that are regarded as significant contributions to the war effort. Hello Americans was produced under the auspices of the Office of the Coordinator of Inter-American Affairs to promote inter-American understanding and friendship during World War II. Ceiling Unlimited, sponsored by the Lockheed-Vega Corporation, was conceived to glorify the aviation industry and dramatize its role in World War II.

The CBS international radio network continued to support the cultural diplomacy initiatives of the State Department and the Office of the Coordinator of Inter-American Affairs throughout the 1940s. Included in this effort were live broadcasts to North and South America of the show Viva America, featuring the journalistic expertise of Edmund A. Chester and the artistic talents of Alfredo Antonini, Terig Tucci, Nestor Mesta Chayres and John Serry Sr.

Since radio was often a "live' media, there were restrictions. Broadcasters were warned not to cut to a commercial with the line, "and now for some good news," and reporters were instructed not to describe bombings precisely enough so that the enemy could tell what they hit, for example, they were to state "the building next to the one I am standing on," not "the First National Bank." While audience participation and man-on-the-street programs were immensely popular, broadcasters realized there was no way to prevent enemy agents from being selected, and these were discontinued. Many broadcasters worked war themes into their programming to such an extent that they confused the targeted audiences. As a result, the Radio War Guide urged broadcasters to focus on selected themes.

At first the Japanese population could not receive propaganda by radio because short-wave receivers were prohibited in Japan. However, the capture of Saipan not only shocked the Japanese because it was considered invincible, but allowed Americans to use medium-wave radio to reach the Japanese islands.

=== Books ===
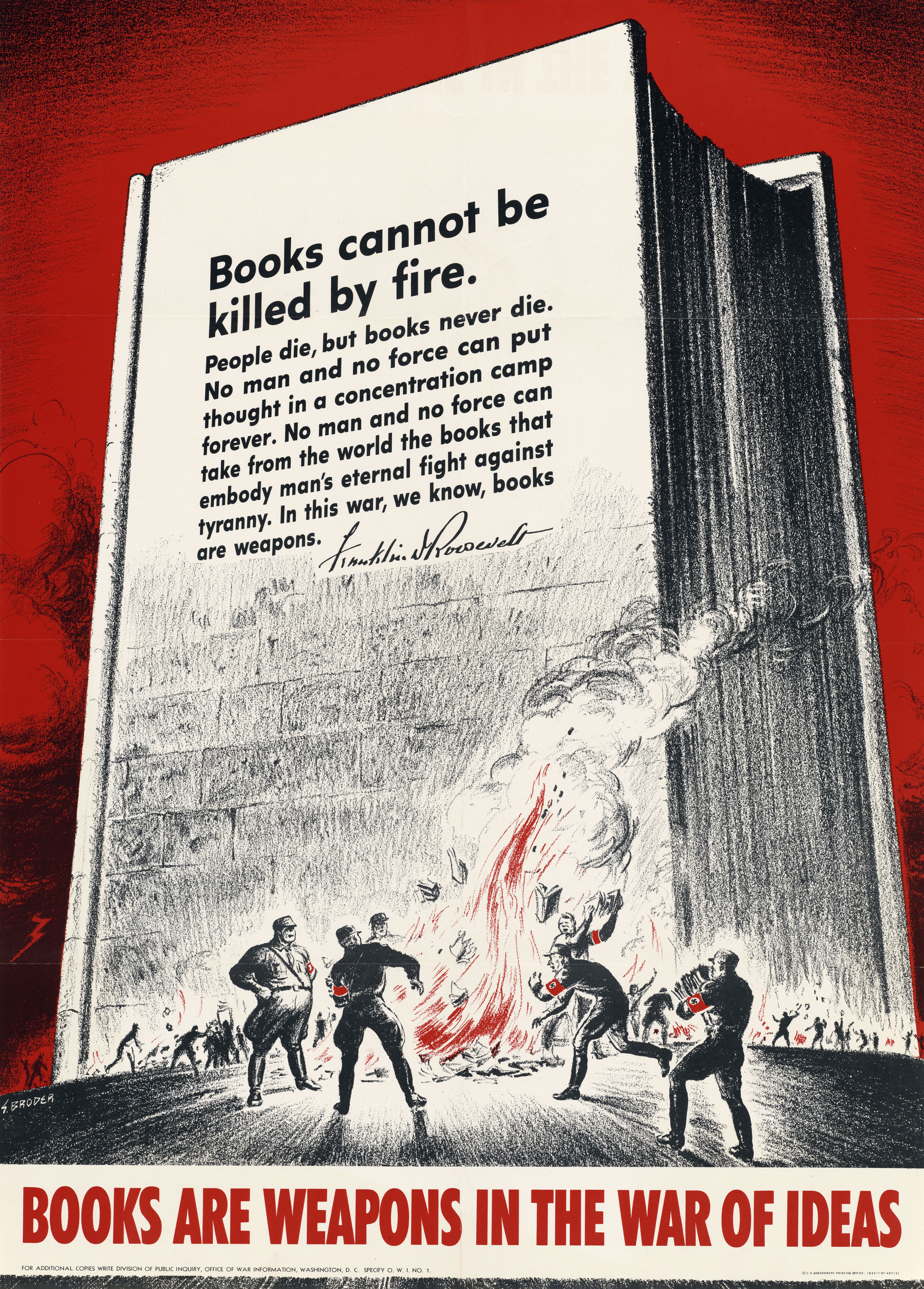
A poster quoting Franklin D. Roosevelt in opposition to the Nazi book burnings

Books were more often used in the post-combat consolidation phases than in combat, particularly because their intent was indirect, to mold the thinkers who would be molding public opinion in the post-war period, and therefore books had more of a long-range influence rather than an immediate effect.

And some topics were considered off limits. Books on submarines were suppressed, even ones drawing on public knowledge and made with naval assistance. In fact, attempts were made to suppress even fictional stories involving submarines. As fiction grew less popular, bookstores promoted non-fiction war books.

A few weeks after D-Day, crates of books were landed in Normandy to be distributed to French booksellers. An equal number of American and British efforts were included in these shipments. Books had been stockpiled for this purpose, and some books were specifically published for it.

=== Films ===
Hollywood movie studios, obviously sympathetic to the Allied cause, soon adapted standard plots and serials to feature Nazis in place of the usual gangster villains while the Japanese were depicted as being bestial, incapable of reason or human qualities. Although Hollywood lost access to most foreign markets during the war, it was now able to use Germans, Italians and Japanese as villains without diplomatic protests or boycotts. Many actors such as Peter Lorre, Conrad Veidt, Martin Kosleck, Philip Ahn and Sen Yung specialized in playing Axis spies, traitors and soldiers. Irreplaceable film workers received draft deferments to allow them to continue producing pro-Allied films.

In the early 1940s, as war was starting to gain importance in Europe, the goal of Hollywood studios was still to entertain. Many productions were musicals, comedies, melodramas or westerns. Major studios kept their neutrality and showed on screen the same isolationist sentiment as their audience. After noticing President Franklin D. Roosevelt's concern about U.S. foreign policy, fascism began to be reported on screen by Hollywood. After the Japanese attack on Pearl Harbor in 1941, the studios were fully supportive of the Allied cause and its demands. Patriotic propaganda was seen as profitable by Hollywood, and it helped to transform the social and political stances of the country, while serving as an instrument of national policy.

Most movies had a background of war, even if their story was a complete invention. However, some were made to tie in with a past event, or even a current event with the release of the film synchronized with the happening in real life. For example, the Academy Award winner for Best Picture Casablanca, was released in the context of American attitudes toward Vichy and Free French Forces. This picture was considered as anti-Vichy, but there was a strong debate about whether this did or did not represent the American government policy. This was one of the most important productions of Hollywood during the war, and very representative of the studios' role and position at the time.

The war happened in the time of an important national conflict: racial segregation. White America was united behind the war, but in black America there was opposition. While Roosevelt was describing the Allied War goals as democratic, Walter Francis White, the executive secretary of the National Association for the Advancement of Colored People (NAACP), said that colored people had to "fight for the right to fight". Many blacks were weighing their loyalty to the country against loyalty to their race. To address the identity problem, the Office of War Information (that controlled and influenced the contents and subjects of American motion pictures) decided to collaborate with black leaders to try to improve Hollywood's portrayal of colored people and obtain their support to the Allied cause, but, it was a failure.

The earliest Hollywood production to satirize any of the Axis governments was You Nazty Spy!, a Three Stooges short released on January 19, 1940, satirizing Hitler (Moe Howard as "Moe Hailstone"), Goering (Curly Howard as "Field Marshal Gallstone") and Goebbels (Larry Fine as "Larry Pebble"), nearly two years before the attack on Pearl Harbor.

The 1941 German attack on the Soviet Union resulted in pro-Russian movies. The war also produced an interest in newsreels and documentaries, which had been unable to compete against entertainment films prior to the war. America's allies were no longer allowed to be depicted negatively in any way.

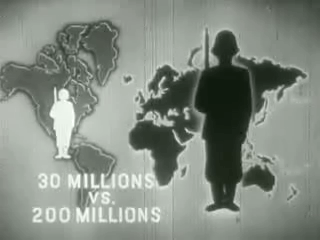
A frame from War Comes To America warning of the massive opposition the Americas could potentially face if the Axis powers conquered Afro-Eurasia

The Office of War Information created a Bureau of Motion Pictures to create documentaries and training films. The most well-known release was Frank Capra's Why We Fight series. This series was created at the request of General George C. Marshall, Chief of Staff of the U.S. Army, for use as an orientation film for new recruits. Capra designed the series to illustrate the enormous danger of Axis conquest and the corresponding justness of the Allies. The series documented the war in seven segments:

- Prelude to War, the rise of Fascism;
- The Nazi Strike, from Anschluss to the invasion of Poland;
- Divide and Conquer, the conquest of continental Europe;
- The Battle of Britain,
- The Battle of Russia,
- The Battle of China, and
- War Comes to America, covering subsequent events.

At President Roosevelt's urging, Why We Fight was also released to the theaters for the general public. In Britain, Churchill ordered the entire sequence to be shown to the public.

Movies were also useful in that propaganda messages could be incorporated into entertainment films. The 1942 film Mrs. Miniver portrayed the experiences of an English housewife during the Battle of Britain and urged the support of both men and women for the war effort. It was rushed to the theaters on Roosevelt's orders.

Furthermore, the 1943 film The Negro Soldier, a government produced documentary also directed by Frank Capra, challenged racial stereotypes in the ranks. Its popularity allowed it to pass over into mainstream distribution.

The 1944 film The Purple Heart was used to dramatize Japanese atrocities and the heroics of American flyers.

In 1933, William Dudley Pelley took a dissenting course. He founded the Silver Shirts, a paramilitary wing of his Christian Party sympathetic to the German Nazi Party. He called himself the "American Hitler". Harold Lasswell, an expert in communications and wartime propaganda, testified at his trial in 1944 that 1,195 statements of Nazi Party ideology were found in the Silver Shirts' Galilean newsletter. Pelley was sentenced to 15 years in prison.

=== Animation ===
World War II transformed the possibilities for animation. Prior to the war, animation was seen as a form of childish entertainment, but that perception changed after Pearl Harbor was attacked. On 8 December 1941, the U.S. Army immediately moved 500 troops into Walt Disney Studios and began working with Walt Disney. Army personnel were stationed at his studio and lived there for the duration of the war. A military officer was actually based in Walt Disney's office. The U.S. Army and Disney set about making various types of films for several different audiences. Most films meant for the public included some type of propaganda, while films for the troops included training and education about a given topic.

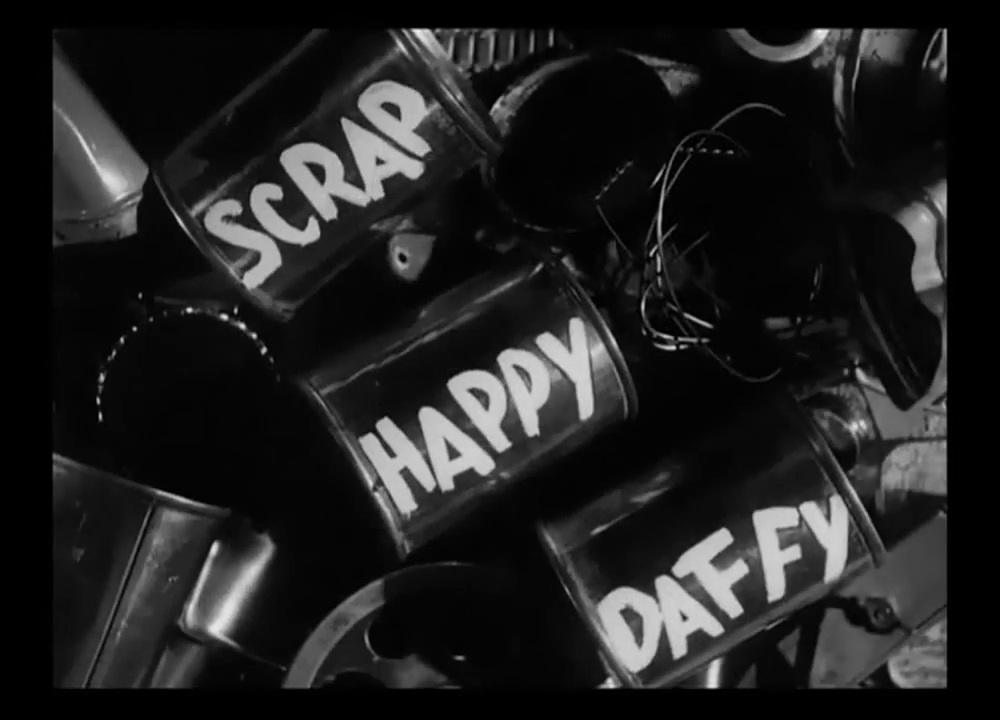
Scrap Happy Daffy, one of many Looney Tunes animations produced during the war

Films intended for the public were often meant to build morale. They allowed Americans to express their anger and frustration through ridicule and humor. Many films simply reflected the war culture and were pure entertainment. Others carried strong messages meant to arouse public involvement or set a public mood. Cartoons such as Bugs Bunny Bond Rally and Foney Fables pushed viewers to buy war bonds, while Scrap Happy Daffy encouraged the donation of scrap metal, and Disney's The Spirit of '43 implored viewers to pay their taxes.

The U.S. and Canadian governments also used animation for training and instructional purposes. The most elaborate training film produced, Stop That Tank!, was commissioned by the Canadian Directorate of Military Training and created by Walt Disney Studios. Troops became familiar with Private Snafu and Lance Corporal Schmuckatelli. These fictional characters were used to give soldiers safety briefs and instructions on expected behavior, while often portraying behavior which was not recommended. The short Spies depicts an intoxicated Private Snafu giving secrets to a Nazi spy, posing as a beautiful woman. Through the information he gives her, the Germans are able to bomb the ship Private Snafu is traveling on, sending him to hell.

Animation was increasingly used in political commentary against the Axis powers. The comedy cartoon Der Fuehrer's Face was one of Walt Disney's most popular propaganda cartoons, depicting Donald Duck dreaming he is a German laborer suffering through intense factory work and Nazi propaganda, before waking up from his nightmare and remembering he is an American citizen. Disney and the U.S. military wanted to depict Germans as living a life that belied the wonderful promises made by Hitler, and producers wished to show that the working conditions in German factories were not as glorious as Hitler made them sound in his speeches.

Education for Death, based on the bestselling book of the same name by Gregor Ziemer, was a more serious use of animation in propaganda. The film centered on children's propaganda in Nazi Germany and follows a boy being indoctrinated into Nazi ideals from birth, only to die young when he is drafted into the Wehrmacht.

=== Magazines ===
Magazines were a favored propaganda dissemination tool, as they were widely circulated. The government issued a Magazine War Guide which included tips for supporting the war effort. Women's magazines were the favored venue for propaganda aimed at housewives, particularly the Ladies' Home Journal. Magazine editors were asked to depict women as coping heroically with the sacrifices of wartime. Fiction was a particularly favored venue, and was used to subtly shape attitudes. Ladies' Home Journal and other magazine also promoted the activities of women in the armed services.

The pulp magazine industry was especially supportive, if only to prevent their being perceived as unessential to the war effort and discontinued for the duration of the war. The Office of War Information distributed guides to writers for Western, adventure, detective and other pulp genres with possible story lines and themes that would help the war effort. Among the suggestions were a detective who was "cheerful" about following a suspect without using an automobile, a woman working in a traditionally male job, the importance of the 35 miles per hour speed limit and carpooling, and good Chinese and British characters.

=== Newspapers ===
Newspapers were told that government press releases would be true, and to give no aid and comfort to the enemy—but this latter was not to be considered a prohibition on releasing bad news. However, partially through the cooperation of supportive journalists, the Office of Censorship (OOC) managed to remove negative news and other items useful to the enemy—such as weather forecasts—although neither the OOC nor any other agency managed to completely slant the news in a positive, morale-boosting manner. Indeed, some government officials found that both newspapers and radio were using uncorroborated news from Vichy France and Tokyo.

=== Army War Show ===
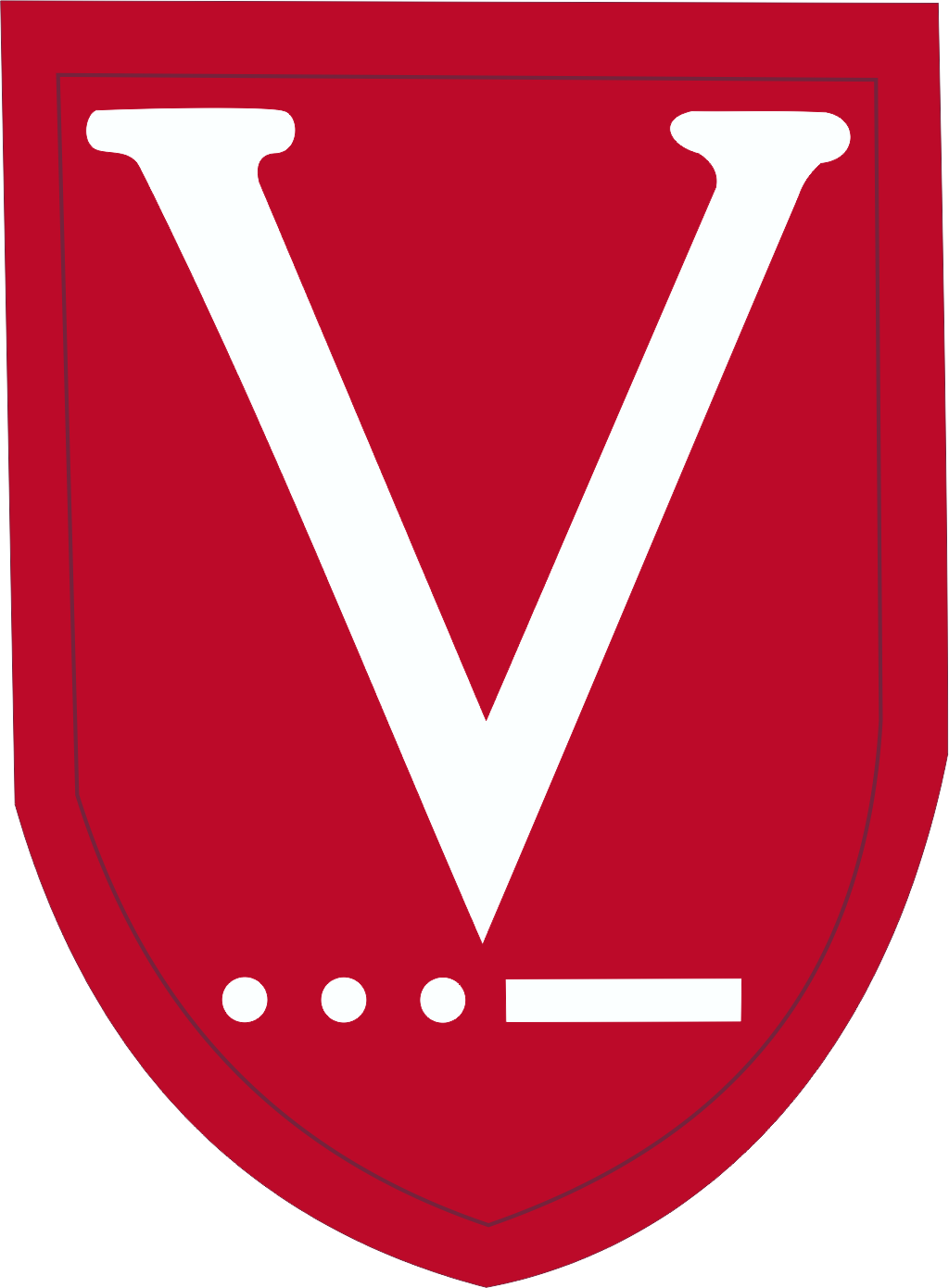
Victory Task Force

In 1942, the army's Bureau of Public Relations decided to produce a tour of the country to demonstrate to the public the army's capabilities. To this end, they created the Provisional Task Force of the Army War Show, commanded by Colonel Wilson T. Bals. A national citizens committee was created to sponsor the show. Stewart McDonald was its president, Henry Steeger its vice president, and former Ringling Brothers-Barnum & Bailey administrators William P. Dunn and John Reddy Jr. its secretary and treasurer. The committee consisted of 54 people, including political, industry, and entertainment luminaries such as Irving Berlin, Katherine Cornell, Marshall Field, Edsel Ford, Helen Hayes, Henry Luce, Paul Robeson, David Sarnoff, Spyros Skouras, and Thomas J. Watson. A non-profit corporation War Shows, Inc. was created to oversee the business aspects; the ticket revenue was turned over to the Army Emergency Relief Fund. War Shows, Inc's officers were New York World's Fair director Joseph M. Upchurch, Richard F. Flood, and Don J. Campbell.

The task force assembled nearly 700 soldiers at Fort Meade in early 1942 to prepare. The tour began in Baltimore with a three-day exhibition on June 12, 1942, and finished on December 20 that year, after touring eighteen American cities. A great number of civilians with experience in professional exposition and public production were called on to support the six-month tour, including father-and-son outdoor show producing team Frank and John Duffield, NBC's Blevins Davis, and Ringling Brothers transportation expert George Smith. By the November shows in Houston, the show had grown to 2,000 people and over 400 pieces of equipment and a cavalry troupe.

A typical show, titled "Here's Your Army", lasted four hours, and included brief demonstrations of infantry, cavalry, and mechanized infantry drills, demonstrations of flame throwers, tanks, and tank destroyers, performances by the band, and fireworks. Nearly 4 million tickets were sold.

== Themes ==
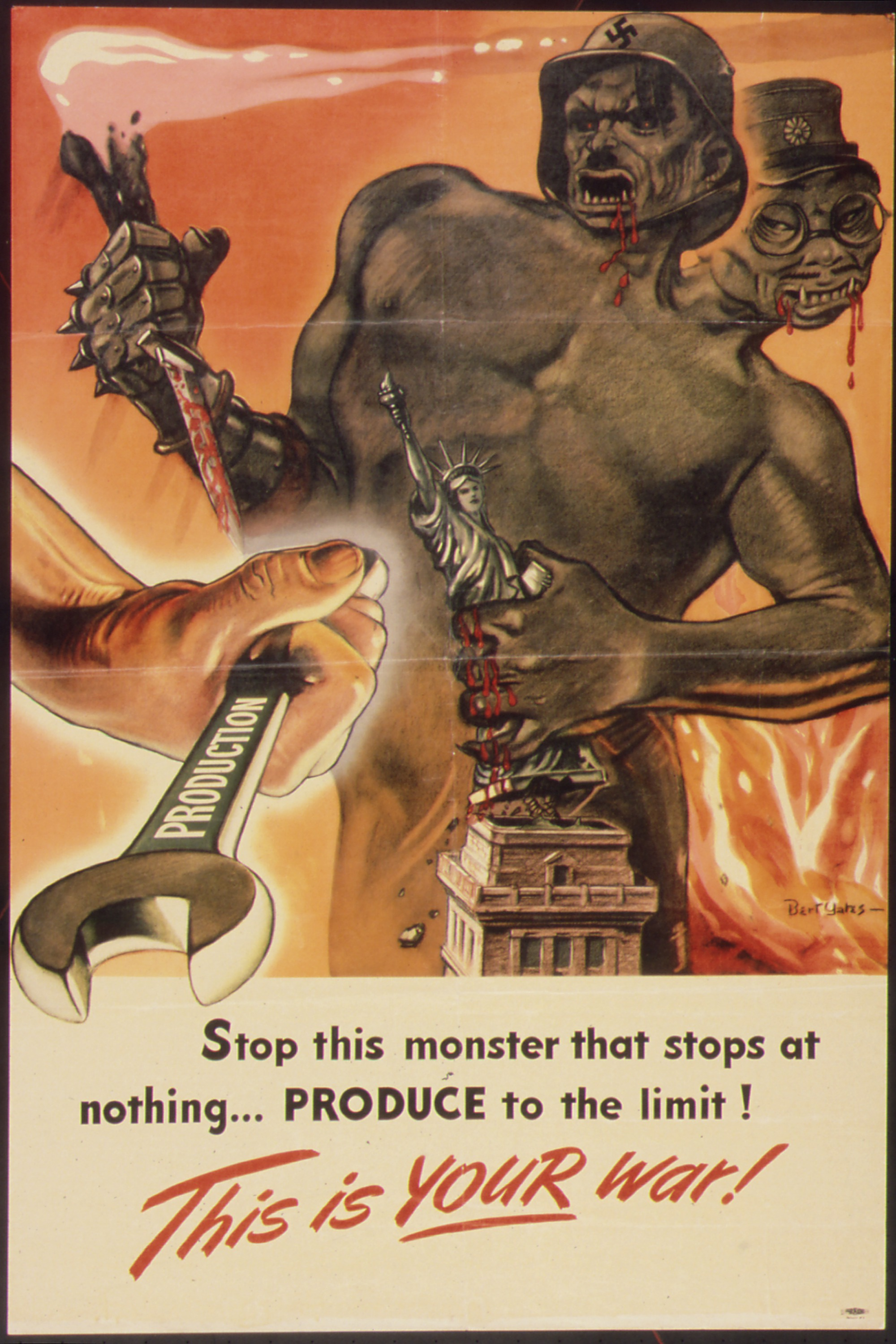
A poster depicting the Axis powers as a two-headed monster with the faces of Hitler and Tojo, attacking the Statue of Liberty

As in Britain, American propaganda depicted the war as an issue of good versus evil, which allowed the government to encourage its population to fight a "just war," and used themes of resistance in and liberation to the occupied countries. In 1940, even prior to being drawn into World War II, President Roosevelt urged every American to consider the effect if the dictatorships won in Europe and Asia. Precision bombing was praised, exaggerating its accuracy, to convince people of the difference between good and bad bombing. Hitler, Tojo, Mussolini and their followers were the villains in American film, even in cartoons where characters, such as Bugs Bunny, would defeat them—a practice that began before Pearl Harbor. Cartoons depicted Axis leaders as not being human.

Roosevelt proclaimed that the war against the dictatorships had to take precedence over the New Deal.

Artists and writers were strongly divided on whether to encourage hatred for the enemy, which occasioned debates. The government rarely intervened in such debates, only occasionally suggesting lines for art to take. However, the OWI suggested plot lines using Axis agents in place of traditional villainous roles, such as the rustler in Westerns.

In one speech, Henry Wallace called for post-war efforts to psychologically disarm the effect of the Axis powers, requiring schools to undo, as far as possible, the poisoning of children's minds by Hitler and the Japanese "warlords." Two days later, a Dr. Seuss's editorial cartoon showed Uncle Sam using bellows to drive germ out of the mind of the child "Germany," while holding the child "Japan" ready for the next treatment.

=== Anti-German ===
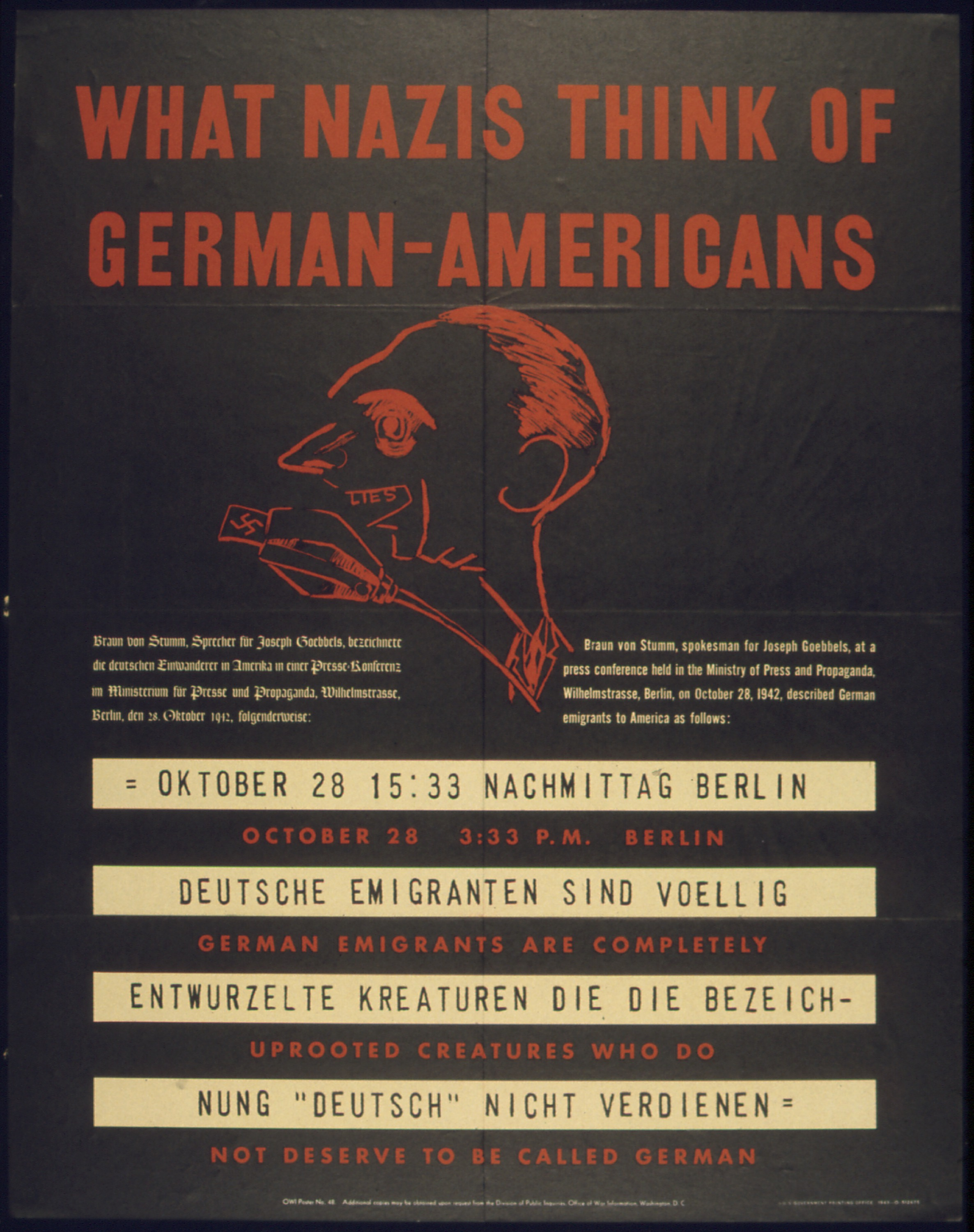
A poster quoting Joseph Goebbels' spokesman Gustaf Braun von Stumm as being insulting to German Americans

Hitler was often depicted in situations ridiculing him, and editorial cartoons usually depicted him in caricature. Hitler's dictatorship was often heavily satirized. To raise morale, even prior to the turning of the war in the Allies' favor, Hitler often appeared in editorial cartoons as doomed. He and the German people were depicted as fools. For example, in an editorial cartoon by Dr. Seuss, a German father scolded his hungry son, telling him that the Germans ate countries, not food.

Nazi Germany was treated as the worst evil within the Axis, a greater threat than Japan and Italy. To counter the much greater desire in the United States to attack Japan, operations in the North African theater were implemented, despite military counterindications, to increase support for attacking Germany. Without such involvement, public pressure to more heavily support the war in the Pacific might have proven irresistible to American leaders.

Germans were often stereotyped as evil in films and posters, although many atrocities were specifically ascribed to Nazis and Hitler specifically, rather than to the undifferentiated German people.

Alternate history novels depicted Nazi invasions of America to arouse support for interventionism.

The Writers' War Board compiled lists of books banned or burned in Nazi Germany and distributed them for propaganda purposes, and thousands of commemorations of the book burnings were staged.

=== Anti-Italian ===
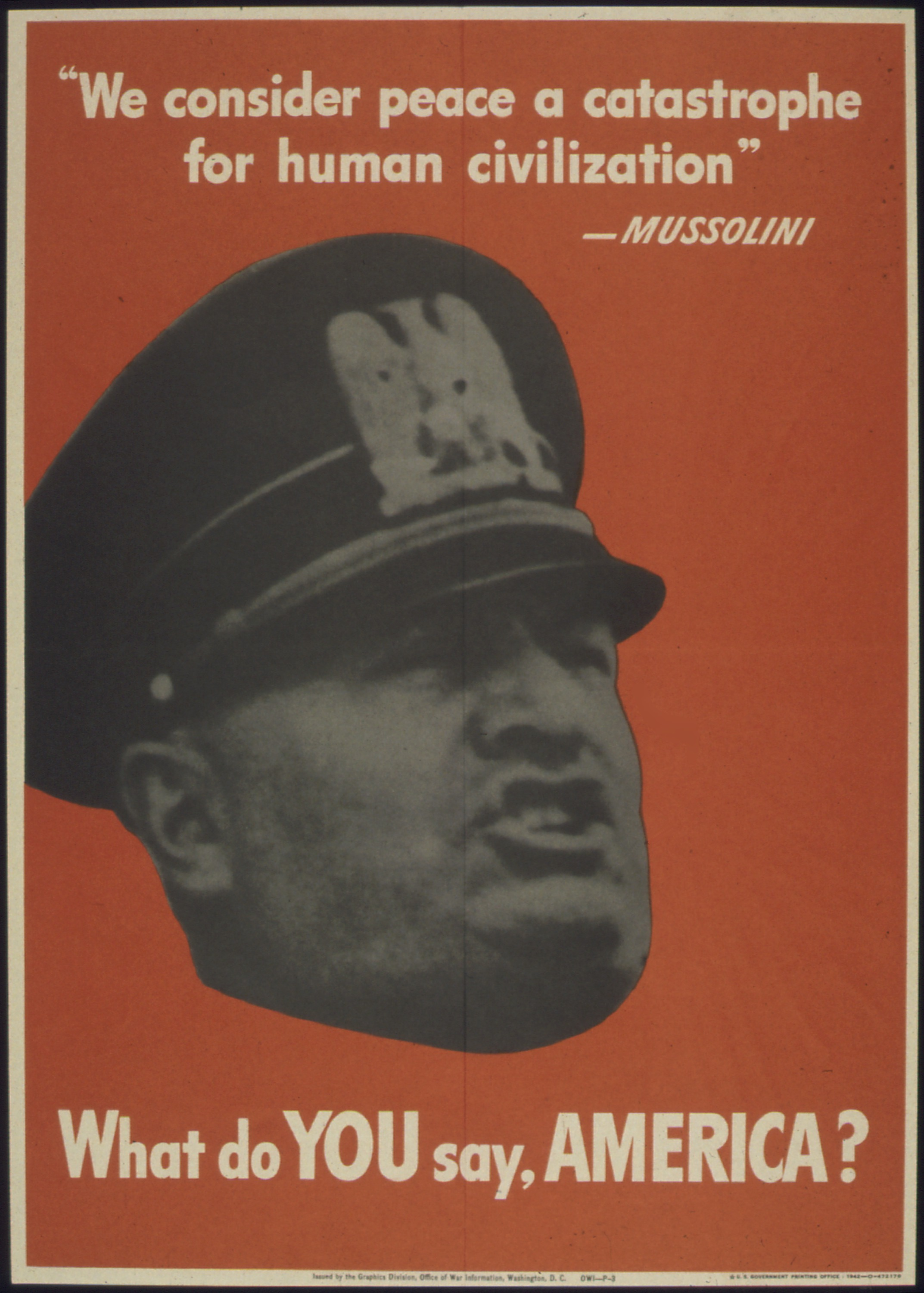
A poster quoting a speech from Mussolini presenting Italian fascism as strongly against peace

Mussolini also appeared in situations ridiculing him. Editorial cartoons depicted him as a two-bit dictator. Italians were often stereotyped as evil in films and posters. Italy, often mocked as the "soft underbelly of the Axis" early in the war, was the first of the major Axis powers to see war approaching its home territory due to nearby defeats in North Africa.

Propagandistic treatment of Italy changed as Sicily became the first part of Europe to be stripped by the British and Americans from Axis rule. American treatment of the Italian people, especially anti-fascist partisans, became much more sympathetic. American media made much of demonstrations of anti-fascist sentiment as evidence that the Italian people were not the enemy. The puppet regime of Benito Mussolini remained an object of derision and hatred, and German troops were seen as agents of oppression of the Italian people. One part or another of Italy would be a war zone until the final weeks of the European war. The death of Mussolini and his allies would be presented as a fitting end to a tyrant.

=== Anti-Japanese ===
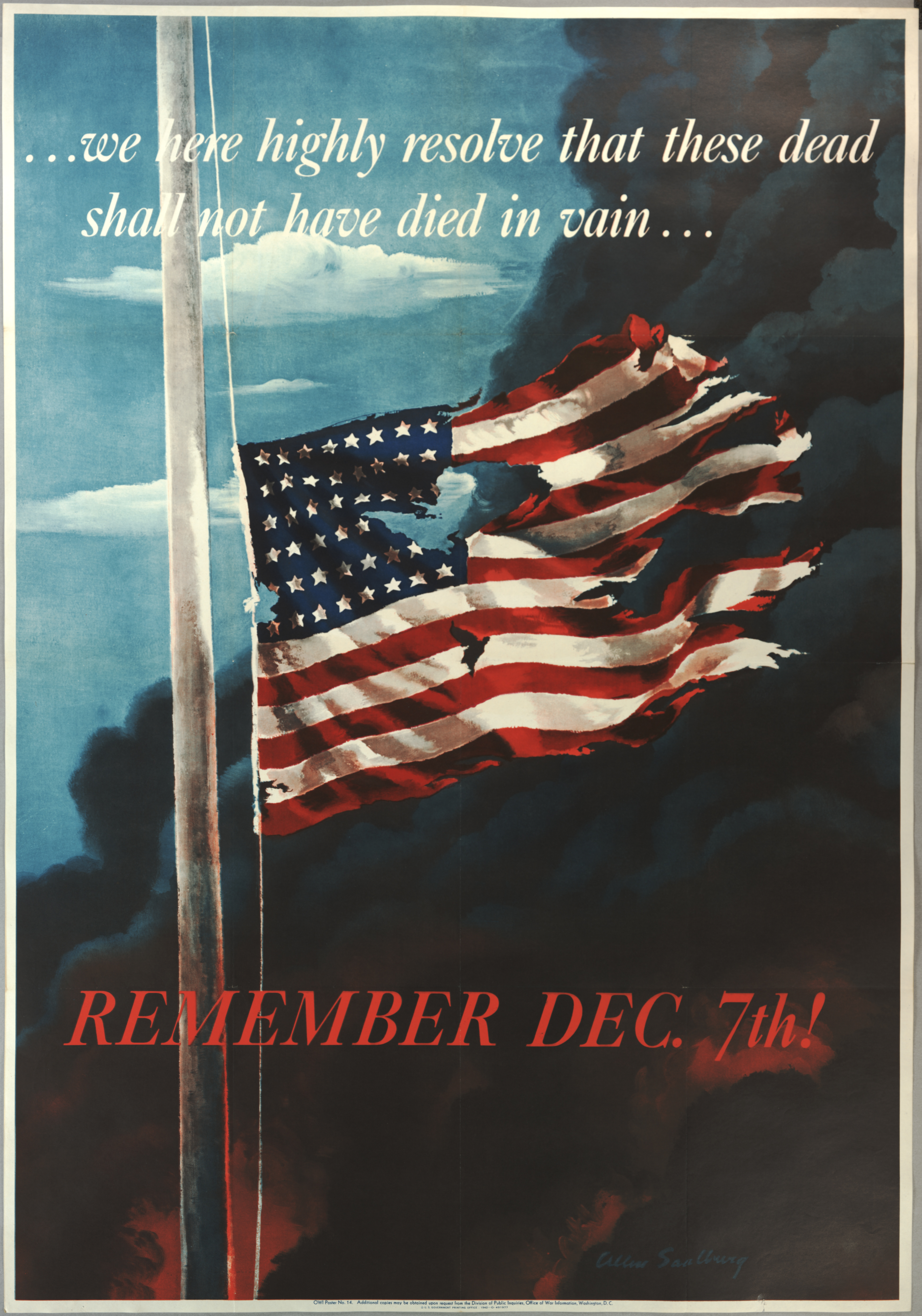
A poster distributed in 1942, evoking the attack on Pearl Harbor and its casualties

Propaganda portrayed the Japanese more than any other Axis power as a foreign, grotesque and uncivilized enemy. Drawing on bushido traditions, American propagandists portrayed the Japanese as blindly fanatic and ruthless, with a history of desiring overseas conquests. Japanese propaganda, such as Shinmin no Michi (or The Way of the Subjects), called for the Japanese people to become "one hundred million hearts beating as one"—which Allied propagandists used to portray the Japanese as a mindless, unified mass. Atrocities were ascribed to the Japanese people as a whole. Even Japanese-Americans would be portrayed as massively supporting Japan (e.g. in the Niihau incident), only awaiting the signal to commit sabotage. Japanese atrocities and their fanatical refusal to surrender supported the portrayal of otherwise racist elements in propaganda.

Even prior to the attack on Pearl Harbor, accounts of atrocities in China roused considerable antipathy for Japan. This stemmed from as early as the Japanese invasion of Manchuria, when accounts were received of Japanese forces of bombing civilians, or firing upon shell-shocked survivors. Such books as Pearl Buck's The Good Earth and Freda Utley's China At War aroused sympathy for the Chinese. As early as 1937, Roosevelt condemned the Japanese for their aggression in China. The Nanjing Massacre achieved particular notoriety due to the number of Western witnesses to it, with Chinese propagandists using it to cement Allied opinion.

Propaganda based on the attack on Pearl Harbor was used with considerable effectiveness, because its outcome was enormous and impossible to counter. Initial reports termed it a "sneak attack" and "infamous behavior". "Remember Pearl Harbor!" became the watchword of the war. Reports of the maltreatment of American prisoners of war also aroused fury, as did reports of atrocities against native populations, with babies being thrown in the air to be caught on bayonets receiving particular attention. When three of the Doolittle Raiders were executed, it evoked a passion for revenge in America, and the image of the "Japanese ape" became common in film and cartoons. The film The Purple Heart dramatized their story, with an airman giving a concluding speech that he now knew that he had understood the Japanese less than he had thought, and that they did not understand Americans if they thought this would frighten them. The diary of a dead Japanese soldier, which contained an entry coolly recounting the execution of a downed airman, was given considerable play as a demonstration of the true nature of the enemy.

The early overwhelming Japanese successes led to a pamphlet "Exploding the Japanese 'Superman' Myth" to counter the effect. The limitations of Japanese troops it cited, although minor, were actual flaws to counter the impression GIs had of Japanese military prowess. The Doolittle Raid was staged after urging from Roosevelt for a counter-attack, if only for morale reasons.

A poster using the Bataan Death March to promote continuous fighting "until every murdering Jap is wiped out!"

Japanese calls for devotion to death were used to present a war of extermination as the only possibility, without any question as to whether it was desirable. One Marine unit was briefed: "Every Japanese has been told that it is his duty to die for the emperor. It is your duty to see that he does so." The suicides at Saipan—of women, children, and the elderly as well as fighting men—only reinforced that belief. A thorough defeat of the Japanese was argued for in magazines so as to prevent a resurgence, as happened in Germany after World War I, of Japanese military power or ambition. This encouraged American forces to attack civilians, on the belief they would not surrender, which fed into Japanese propaganda about American atrocities.

Hirohito, Hideki Tojo, and undifferentiated "Japs" were often portrayed in caricature. Dr. Seuss's editorial cartoons, which often depicted Hitler and Mussolini, opted for a "Japan" figure rather than any given leader.

One OWI suggestion for adapting "pulp" formulas was a sports story of a professional baseball team touring Japan, which would allow the writers to show the Japanese as ruthless and incapable of sportsmanship.

American popular songs at the time included "We're Gonna Have to Slap the Dirty Little Jap," "Taps for the Japs," "We’ll Nip the Nipponese," "We’re going to play Yankee Doodle in Tokyo," and "You’re a Sap, Mr. Jap." Wartime filmmakers embellished characteristics of Japanese culture that the American people would find scandalously foreign.

At the beginning of the war artists portrayed the Japanese as nearsighted, bucktoothed, harmless children. Indeed, many Americans believed that Germany had convinced Japan to attack Pearl Harbor. As the war progressed, Japanese soldiers and civilians would be portrayed in films as evil, rat faced enemies that desired global domination.

In countries occupied by Japan and forced to join its would-be Greater East Asia Co-Prosperity Sphere, the failure to sustain the economic level prior to the war, particularly in the Philippines, was quickly used in propaganda about the "Co-Poverty Sphere."

Leaflets air-dropped to the Japanese people informed them of the Potsdam Declaration, which brought to bear the extent of Allied victory, and of the Japanese government's peace negotiations, undermining the ability of the Japanese hard-liners to insist on continued war.

=== Careless talk ===
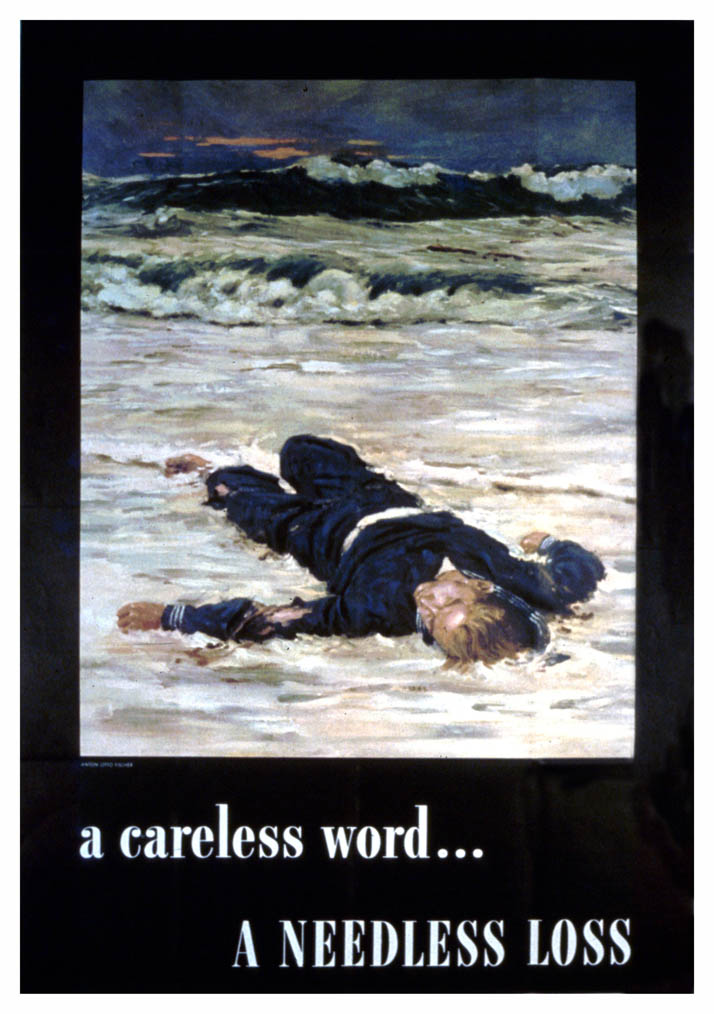
A poster by Anton Otto Fischer showing a dead United States Navy seaman, presumably killed in an enemy attack as a result of leaked intelligence

Many posters ridiculed and shamed careless talk as providing information to the enemy, resulting in Allied deaths. His effort presented to the public as a device to prevent people with sensitive information from talking about it where spies or saboteurs could listen in.

However, that was not the real purpose, for the propaganda continued long after the enemy fleet had been sunk and their spy networks destroyed. The problem was with negative rumors, that spread much faster than good news, and threaten to weaken home front morale or make American groups fear or hate each other. Historian D'Ann Campbell argues that the purpose of the wartime posters, propaganda, and censorship of soldiers' letters was not to foil spies, but "to clamp as tight a lid as possible on rumors that might lead to discouragement, frustration, strikes, or anything that would cut back military production." This was a major topic endorsed by the Office of War Information.

Some of these posters contained the most well known slogans of the war and many were depicted by propaganda artist Cyril Kenneth Bird. Other slogans used for this type of poster were "loose talk costs lives", "loose lips sink ships", "Another careless word, another wooden cross", and "bits of careless talk are pieced together by the enemy". Stories also emphasized an anti-rumor theme, as when one woman advised another not to talk with a man about her war job, because the woman he is dating is untrustworthy and might be an enemy agent.

Rumor mongering was discouraged on the grounds it fomented divisions in America and promoted defeatism and alarmism. Alfred Hitchcock directed Have You Heard?, a photographic dramatization of the dangers of rumors during wartime, for Life magazine.

=== Victories ===
Battle victories and heroism were promoted for morale purposes, while losses and defeats were underplayed. Despite his blunders in the first days of the war, General Douglas MacArthur was presented as a war hero due to the dire need for one. The desperate situation on Bataan was played down, although its fall caused considerable demoralization. The Doolittle Raid was carried out solely to help morale rather than to cause damage, a purpose which it fulfilled. After the Battle of Coral Sea, the Navy reported more Japanese damage than had actually been inflicted, and declared it a victory, which the Japanese also did. The decisive victory at the Battle of Midway was emblazoned on newspaper headlines, but was reported with restraint and the U.S. Navy overstated the Japanese damage. Life warned that Midway did not mean that Japan was no longer on the offensive.

In 1942, the survivors of the Battle of Savo Island were removed from public circulation to prevent news from leaking, and the August 9th disaster did not reach the newspapers until mid-October.

Limiting the distribution of bad news caused difficulty with gasoline rationing, as Americans were kept unaware of numerous tanker sinkings.

Earlier, people complained that the government was covering up the extent of the damage at Pearl Harbor, although this was partly to keep it from the Japanese. The Japanese had a good idea of the damage they inflicted, so only Americans were kept ignorant. One reporter reported, "Seven of the two ships sunk at Pearl Harbor have now rejoined the fleet." Although complaints of news suppression continued, both the newspapers and radio took favorable news and embellished it, a process not countered by the government.

Joseph Goebbels countered this propaganda to prevent it from influencing Germany, downplaying the defense of Corrigidor and attacking Douglas MacArthur as a coward. This was not very successful, as the German people knew it understated the American defense and that MacArthur had left under orders.

The invasion of North Africa produced a morale boost when American forces were bogged down in New Guinea and the Guadalcanal Campaign.

After Guadalcanal, attention was focused on Europe, where Italy was taken, heavy bombing was hammering Germany, and the Red Army was steadily advancing west.

=== False optimism ===
Some propaganda was directed to counter people's hopes that it would not be a long, hard war. Despite air victories in Europe, Dr. Seuss depicted Hitler as a mermaid destroying Allied shipping. The U.S. War Department supported the syndication of Bill Mauldin's cartoons because Mauldin was making the war appear bitter and onerous, showing that the victory would not be easy. His depiction of U.S. soldiers with disheveled appearances and sad, vacant eyes conveyed the difficulty of the war.

=== Death and injury ===
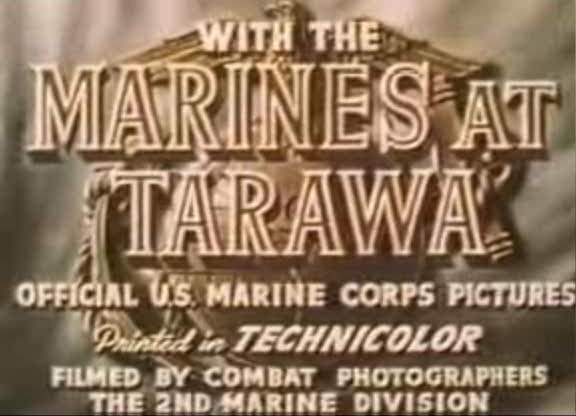
With the Marines at Tarawa showed more gruesome battle scenes than previous films

Until 1944, the mayhem of war (dead and wounded) was mostly toned down by American propagandists, who followed instructions allowing them to show a few wounded soldiers in a crowd. Later, more realistic presentations were allowed, partly owing to popular demand. The earlier attitude was supported by the media; for example, NBC warned that broadcasts were not to be "unduly harrowing." However, the American public wanted more realism on the grounds that they could handle bad news. Roosevelt finally authorized photos of dead soldiers, to keep the public from growing complacent about the toll of war.

When The Battle of San Pietro showed dead GIs wrapped in mattress covers, some officers tried to prevent troopers in training from seeing it, for fear of morale; General Marshall overrode them, to ensure that the soldiers took their training seriously.

The OWI emphasized to returning, battle-scarred soldiers that there were places and jobs for them in civilian life. This promise was also featured in romantic stories, where a sweet, gentle heroine would help the veteran adjust to civilian life after his return from the war.

=== War effort ===
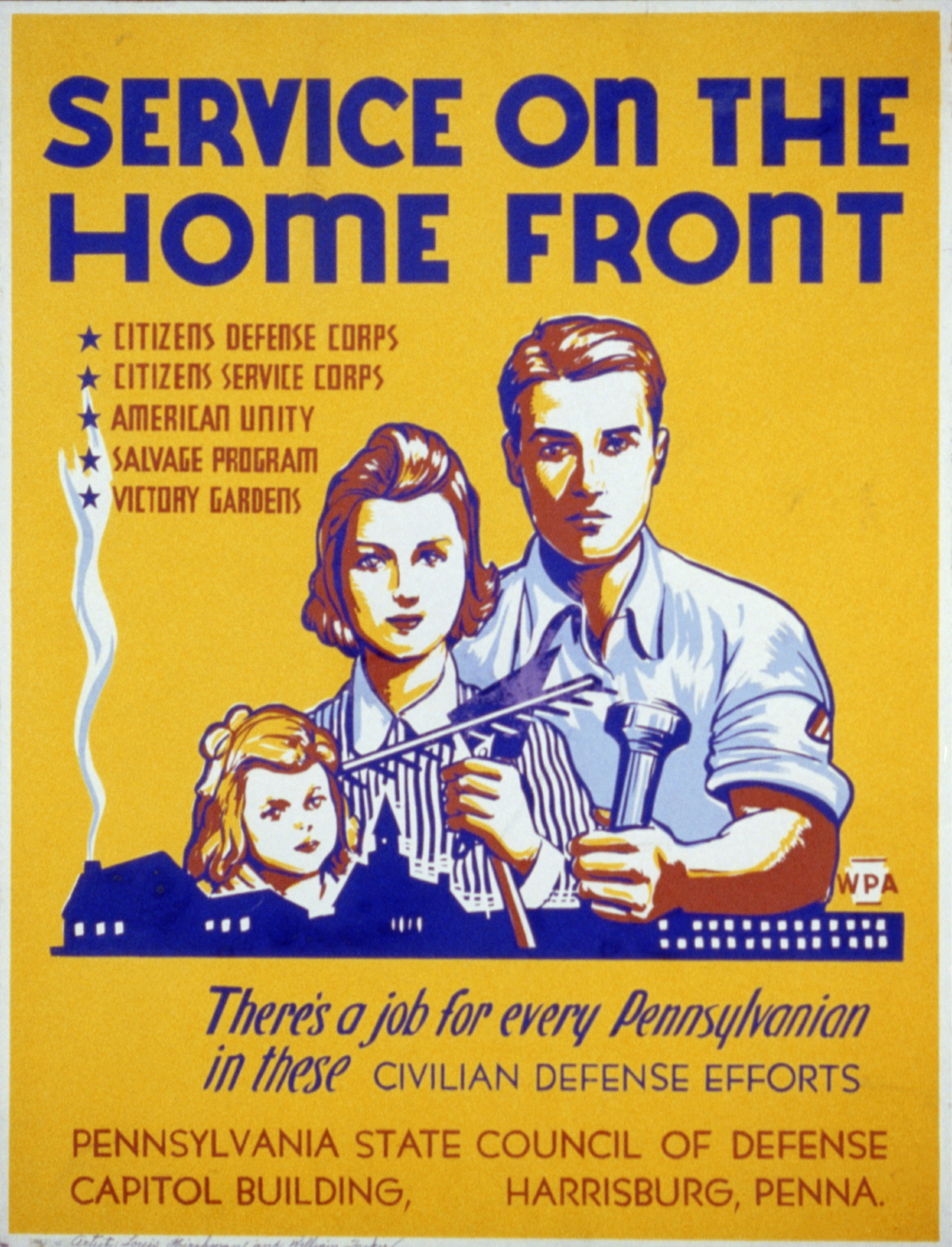
A poster distributed by the Government of Pennsylvania listing ways to assist in the home front

Americans were called upon to support the war effort in many ways. Cartoons depicted those who talked about victory but clearly were sitting around waiting for others to ensure it or showed how red tape was detrimental to the war effort. Defeatism was attacked, national unity was promoted, and themes of community and sacrifice were emphasized. Fictional characters were sharply divided into selfish villains and heroes who put the needs of others first and learned to identify with the defenders of freedom.

Propagandists were instructed to convey the message that the person viewing the propaganda media stood to personally lose if he or she failed to contribute; for example, the appeal for women to contribute to the war effort more closely personalized the soldiers dependent on their work as their sons, brothers and husbands.

Considerable complications were caused by censorship and the need to prevent the enemy from learning how much damage they had inflicted. For example, Roosevelt's fireside chat described the damage at Pearl Harbor as "serious" but he could not "give exact damage."

Many artists and writers knew that keeping up morale was important, but considerable debate arose over whether to go for light frivolous diversions, or to impress the severity of the war to stir up support.

Authors of fiction were encouraged to show their characters buying war bonds, conserving, planting victory gardens, and otherwise acting war-mindedly; characters could refrain from calling loved ones to avoid straining the phone system, or a romance would start when a man and woman carpooled.

Many stories were set in the frontier era or on family farms, to emphasize traditional virtues such as hard work, innocence, piety, independence and community values.

==== Civil defense ====
The Office of Civil Defense was created to inform Americans what to do in case of enemy attack. Within a day of the attack on Pearl Harbor, it produced pamphlets describing what to do in event of an air raid. It also promoted civilian morale, and its emblems helped remind people that the war was continuing.

==== Conservation ====
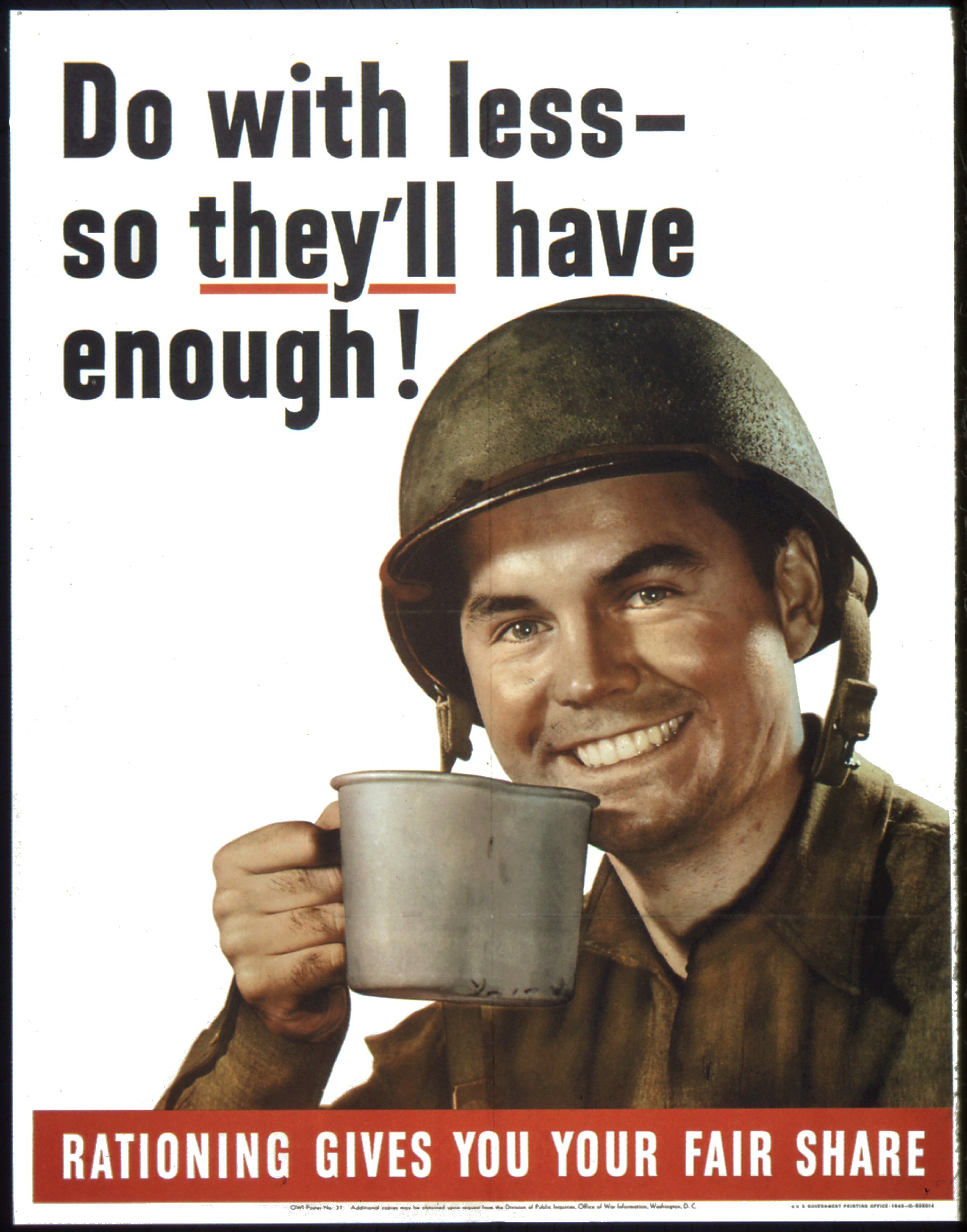
Conserving food was a significant aspect of Allied home front propaganda; posters such as this promoted rationing to ensure plentiful military rations could be issued to troops

Women's magazines carried numerous tips for housewives on thrifty purchasing, dealing with rationing, and how to cope in a period of limited supplies. General Mills distributed a Betty Crocker "cookbooklet" with wartime recipes. A Victory Cookbook explained the principles of wartime cooking, starting with the need to share food with the fighting men. Ladies' Home Journal explained the principles behind sugar rationing, for example, sugarcane could be used to make explosives. The Office of Price Administration urged Americans in restaurants not to ask for extra butter or a refill on coffee. Radio soap operas used plots about wartime rationing and condemned the hoarding of goods.

Rubber was in particularly short supply, and rubber rationing had the deepest impact on American life. However, the Rubber Survey Report, produced by a committee to investigate the rubber supply, succeeded in changing public opinion by showing the good reasons for rationing. Since gasoline was needed to power planes and military automobiles, Americans were encouraged to conserve. This also helped conserve rubber. Carpooling was promoted in government campaigns.

Scrap drives were instituted, and supported by government PR efforts, even before the declaration of war. Such programs as Salvage for Victory redoubled after the outbreak. Many private individuals organized and publicized some of the most successful scrap drives of the war. President Roosevelt sent a letter to Boy Scout and Girl Scout groups, urging the children to support scrap drives. Cartoons ridiculed those who did not collect scrap.

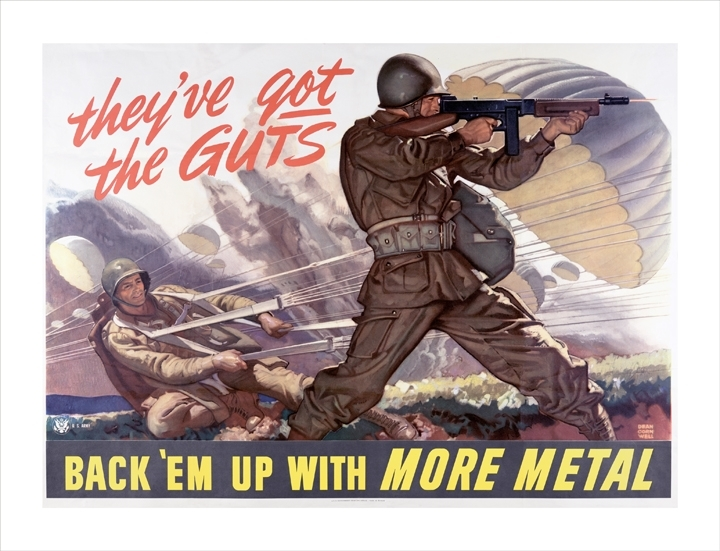
Many posters such as this one promoted salvaging scrap and other materials to be used in wartime manufacturing

Conservation was the largest theme in poster propaganda, accounting for one of every seven posters during the war. Conserving materials, in the kitchen and around the home, was one of five major topics in posters with conservation themes. Other topics included purchasing war bonds, planting victory gardens, the Office of Price Administration, and rationing. Women were encouraged to help with conservation in their cooking, saving fat and grease for explosives, and rationing sugar, meat, butter, and coffee to leave more for the soldiers. Butcher shops and markets handed out bulletins that urged the conservation of waste fat, which could be brought back to the butcher. Due to these posters and other forms of propaganda, the United States recycled 538 million pounds (244 kt) of waste fats, 46 billion pounds (21 Mt) of paper, and 800 million pounds (360 kt) of tin.

People were told to conserve materials used in clothing, which resulted in clothing becoming smaller and shorter. Fiction often depicted a heroine who spent her high wages on fancy dress, but found that her soldier boyfriend disapproved until he learned she had a war job. Even then, he wanted her to change back to the clothes he knew her in before they went out.

===== Industry =====
Industry was also called on to conserve. Lucky Strike used the metals in their dyes as a justification for changing their packaging from green to white. Prior to the shutdown of commercial production, cars no longer carried chrome.

==== Production ====
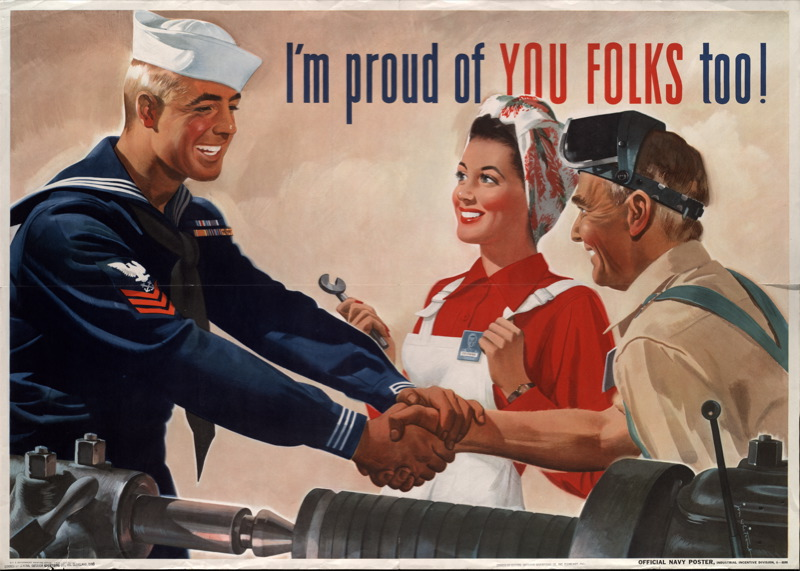
A sailor saluting war production: "I'm proud of you folks too!

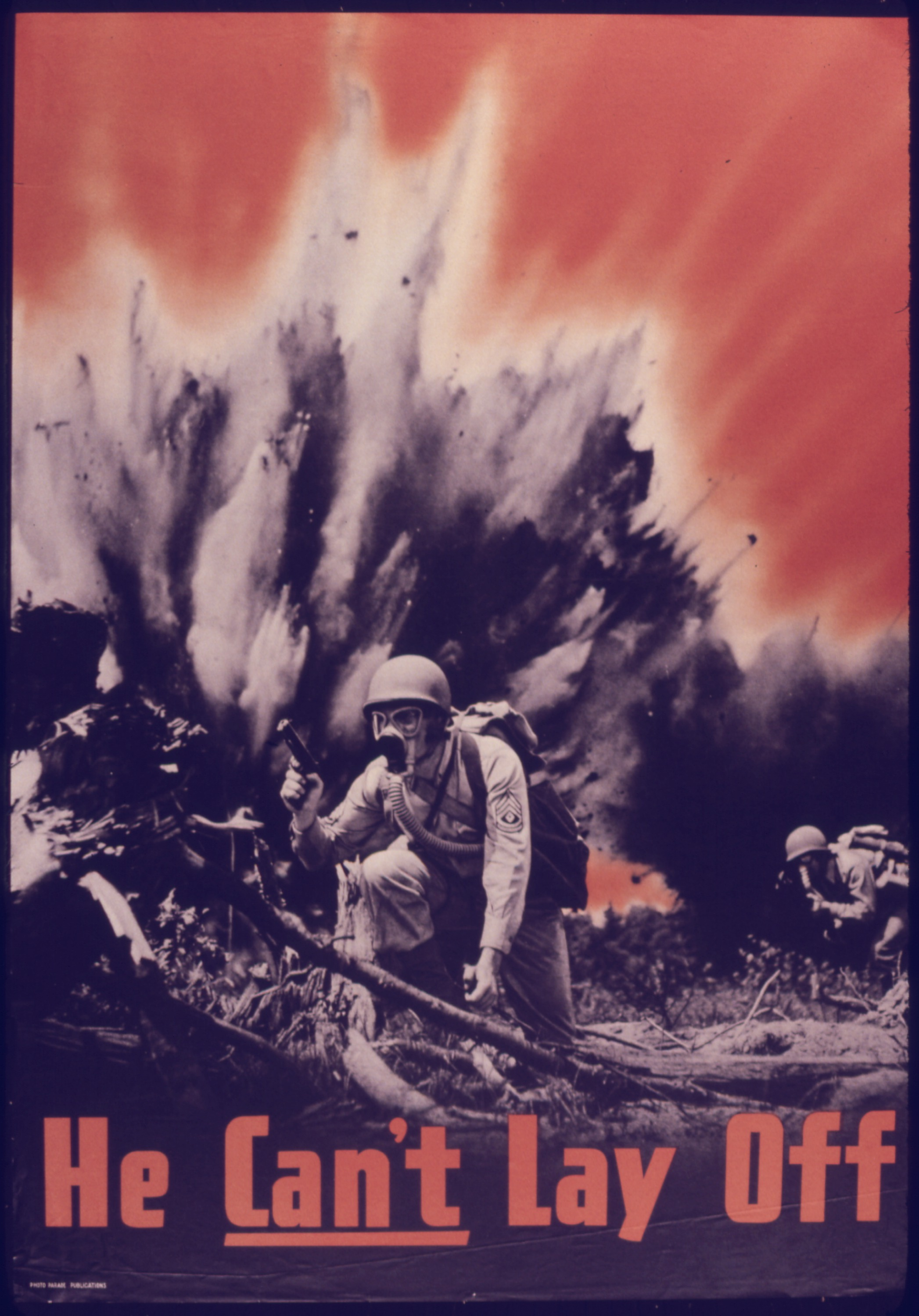
Posters such as this one promoted hard work and discouraged absenteeism among workers in wartime industries

Even prior to Pearl Harbor, Roosevelt called on the United States to be the arsenal of democracy in support of other countries at war with fascism.

Industrial and agricultural production was a major focus of poster campaigns. Although the wartime boom meant that people had money to buy things for the first time since the Depression, propaganda emphasized the need to support the war effort, and not spend their money on non-essential items and so divert material from the war effort. The manufacture of the last civilian car was publicized in such venues as Life. Factories were represented as part of the war effort, and greater worker cooperation with management was urged. Stories symbolized such harmony by featuring romances between a working-class war worker and her employer. Cartoons depicted labor unrest as pleasing Hitler and racial discrimination as preventing the accomplishment of essential work. Fictional treatments of war issues had emphasized the need for workers to combat absenteeism and high turnover. Business entrepreneurs founding new businesses for military production were hailed as exemplars of American economic individualism.

After the death of the Sullivan brothers, their parents and sister made visits to shipyards and armament factories to encourage increased production. Veterans of the Guadalcanal campaign, America's first major offensive of the war, were also sent to factories to encourage production and discourage absenteeism.

Economy and industry were strongly emphasized in United States propaganda posters because of the need for long term production during the war. Factory workers were encouraged to become not just workers, but "Production Soldiers" on the home front. These posters were used to persuade workers to take shorter breaks, work longer hours, and produce as many tools and weapons as possible to increase production for the military. Shipyards hung out banners to encourage ships for victory.

Increased production resulted in more workers moving to factory towns, straining available housing and other amenities. As a result, fictional plots often dealt with the need for homeowners to take in boarders and the necessity for tolerance and unity between residents and newcomers.

==== Victory gardens ====
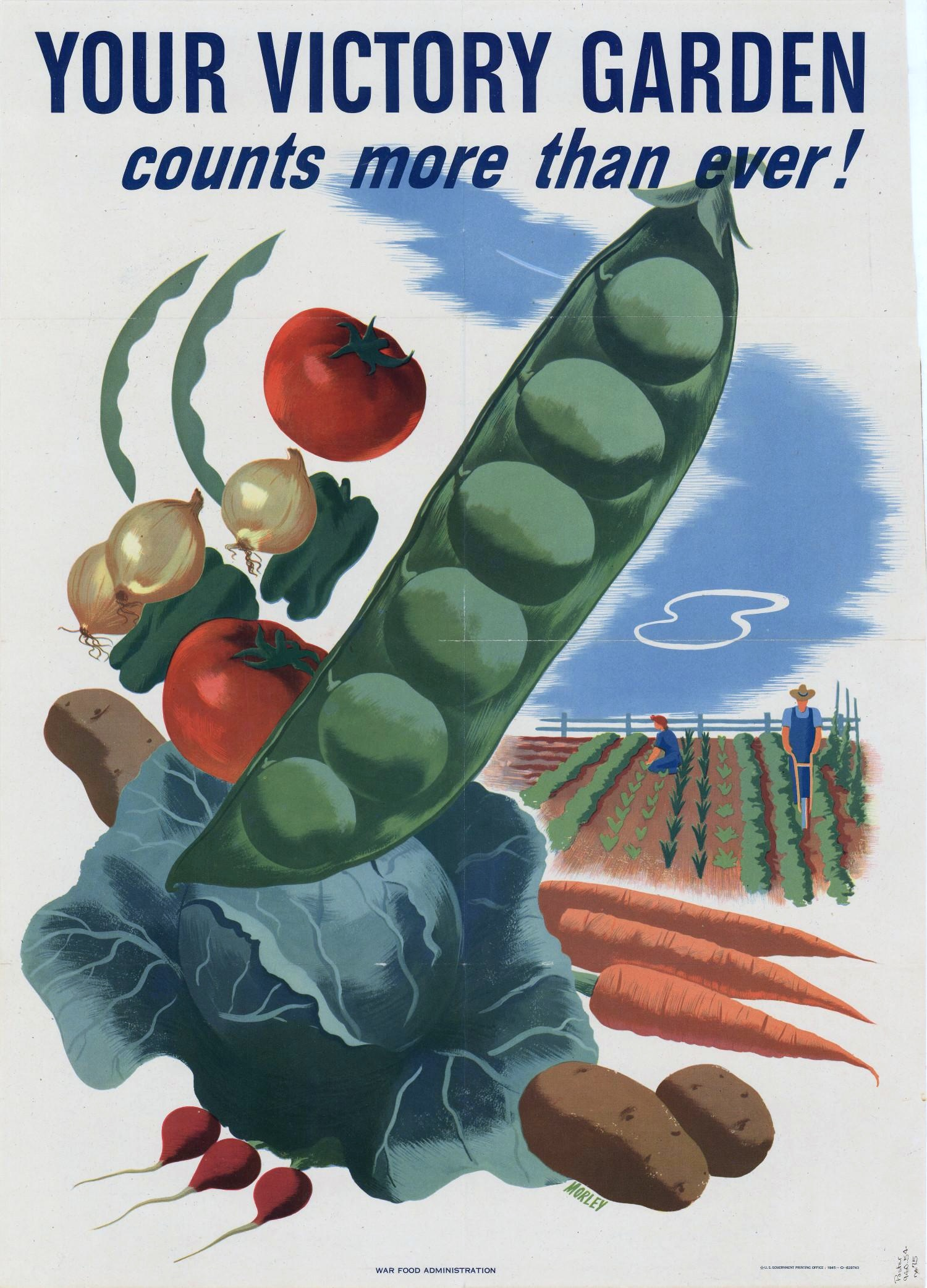
A poster promoting the planting of victory gardens by American civilians

The government encouraged people to plant vegetable gardens to help prevent food shortages. Magazines such as Saturday Evening Post and Life printed articles supporting it, while women's magazines included directions for planting. Because planting these gardens was regarded as being patriotic, they were termed victory gardens, and women were encouraged to can and preserve food they raised from these gardens. While the U.S. Department of Agriculture provided information, many commercial publishers also issued books on how to plant these gardens.

During the war years, Americans planted 50 million victory gardens. These produced more vegetables than the total commercial production, and much of it was preserved, following the slogan: "Eat what you can, and can what you can't." The slogan "grow your own, can your own" also encouraged victory gardens to be planted.

==== War bonds ====
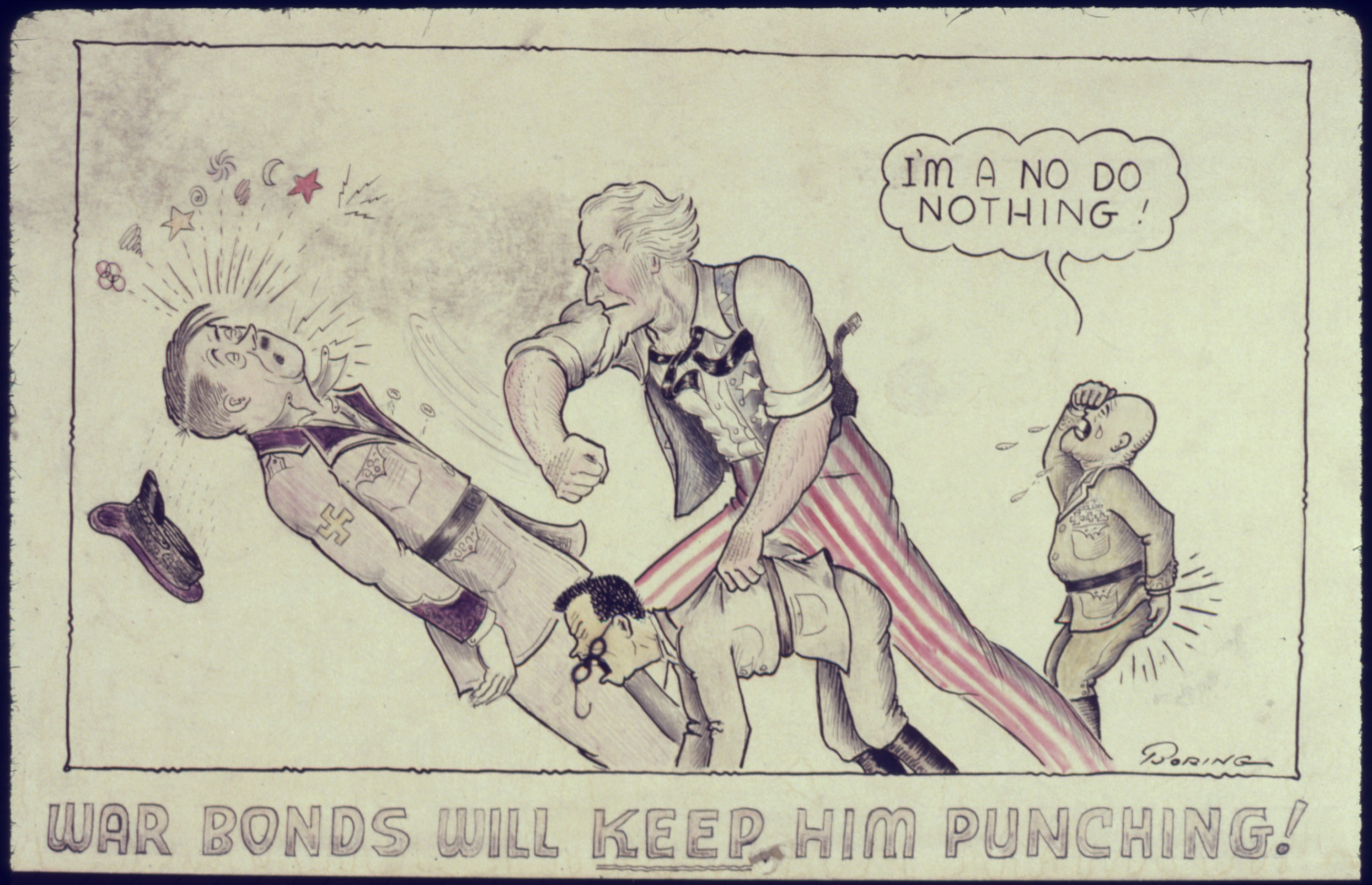
"War Bonds will keep him punching!" Poster showing Uncle Sam punching Hitler, holding injured Tojo, while Mussolini cries in pain exclaiming "I'm a no do nothing!"

During the war, the sale of war bonds was extensively promoted. Originally termed "Defense Bonds", they were called "war bonds" after the attack on Pearl Harbor. Much of the nation's artistic talent and best advertising techniques were used to encourage people to buy the bonds so as to keep the program voluntary.

The War Advertising Board did its best to convince people that buying bonds was a patriotic act, giving buyers a stake in the war. Advertisements were initially used on radio and in newspapers, but later magazines were also used, with both government and private companies producing the advertisements. The Writers' War Board was founded for the purpose of writing copy for war bond ads.

War bond rallies and drives were common, and were staged at many social events. Teachers passed out booklets to children to allow them to save toward a bond by purchasing war bond stamps.

Marlene Dietrich and many other female movie stars sold many thousands of dollars' worth of war bonds. The Little Orphan Annie radio show urged its young listeners to sell war stamps and war bonds. Even product ads often contained the slogan, "Buy War Bonds and Stamps!". Enrolling in payroll deduction plans to buy war bonds was also urged through the media.

One hundred and thirty-five billion dollars worth of liberty bonds were sold, most of which were purchased by banks, insurance companies and corporations. However, individuals purchased $36 billion in bonds, with children accounting for close to $1 billion.

==== Womanpower ====
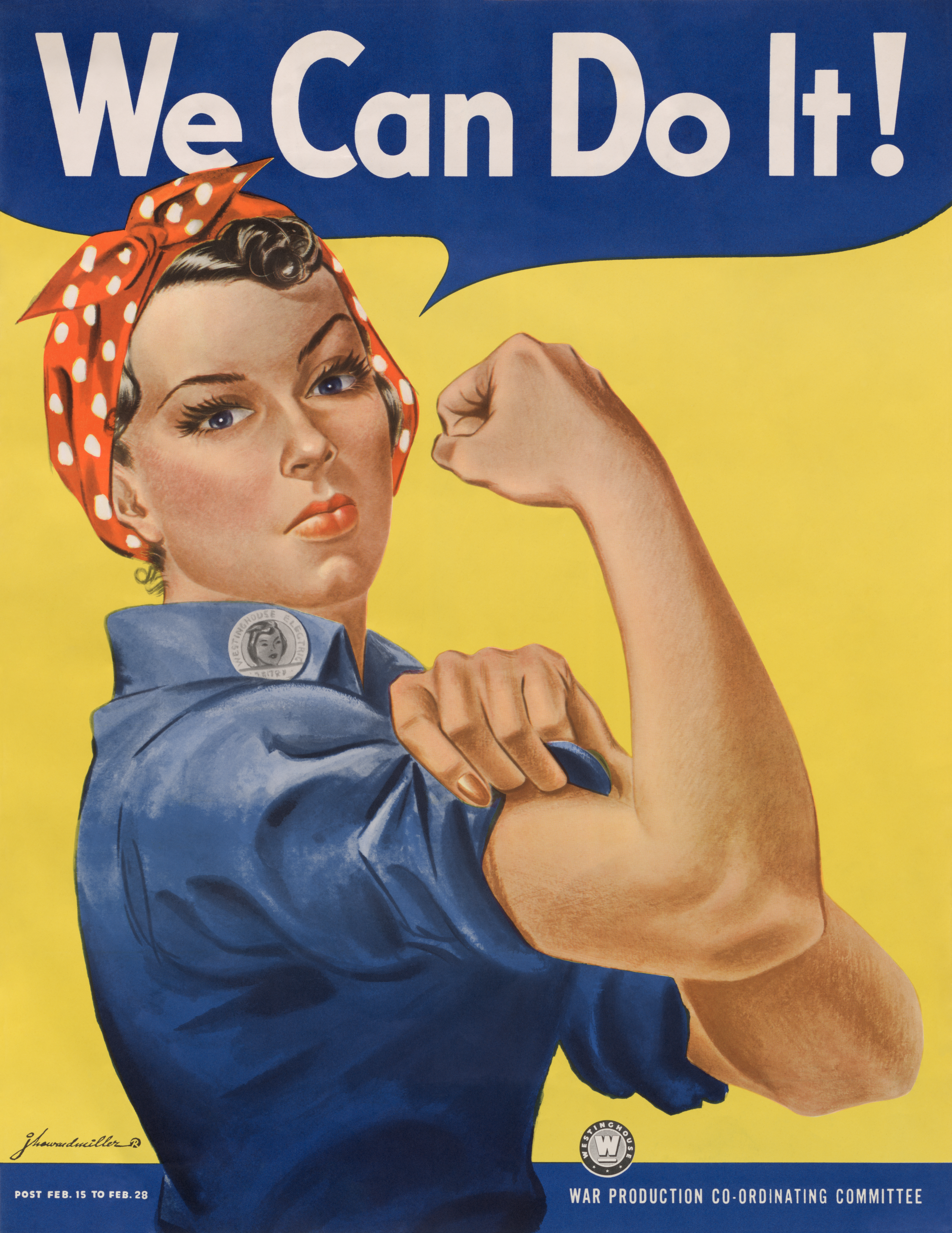
The famous "We Can Do It!" poster was distributed during World War II, but only became popular in the 1960s

Major campaigns were launched to encourage women to enter the work force and convince their husbands that this was appropriate behavior. Government campaigns targeting women were addressed solely at housewives, perhaps because already employed women could move to the higher-paid "essential" jobs on their own, or perhaps in the belief that housewives would be the primary source of new workers. Propaganda was also directed at husbands, many of whom were unwilling to have their wives working. Fiction also addressed husbands' resistance to their wives working.

Key symbolic figures such as "Rosie the Riveter" and "Mrs. Casey Jones" appeared in posters across the country representing strong women who supported their husbands in the war effort. Due to all the propaganda targeting female wartime duties, the number of women working jumped 15% from 1941 to 1943. Women were the primary figures of the home front, which was a major theme in the poster propaganda media, and, as the war continued, women began appearing more frequently in war posters. At first, they were accompanied by male counterparts, but later women began to appear as the central figure in the posters. These posters were meant to show a direct correlation with the efforts of the home front to the war overseas and portray women as directly affecting the war. Radios also broadcast information and appeals, drawing on patriotic calls and the need of such work to save men's lives. In the later 20th century, Rosie the Riveter would be adopted by feminists movements as a movement symbol. Though in the 21st century, some historians viewed the campaign as sexist, claiming that "women were being encouraged to join the workforce, but with the understanding that they would abdicate their posts as soon as the soldiers returned."

Two major campaigns were launched: "Women in the War," to recruit for the armed services and war-related jobs; and "Women in Necessary Services," or such jobs as laundry, clerking in grocery and drug stores, and other employment necessary to support the economy. Books and magazines addressed women with the need for their labor. Many works of fiction depicted women working in industries suffering labor shortages, although generally in the more glamorous industries. Major magazines covers, movies, and popular songs all depicted female workers.

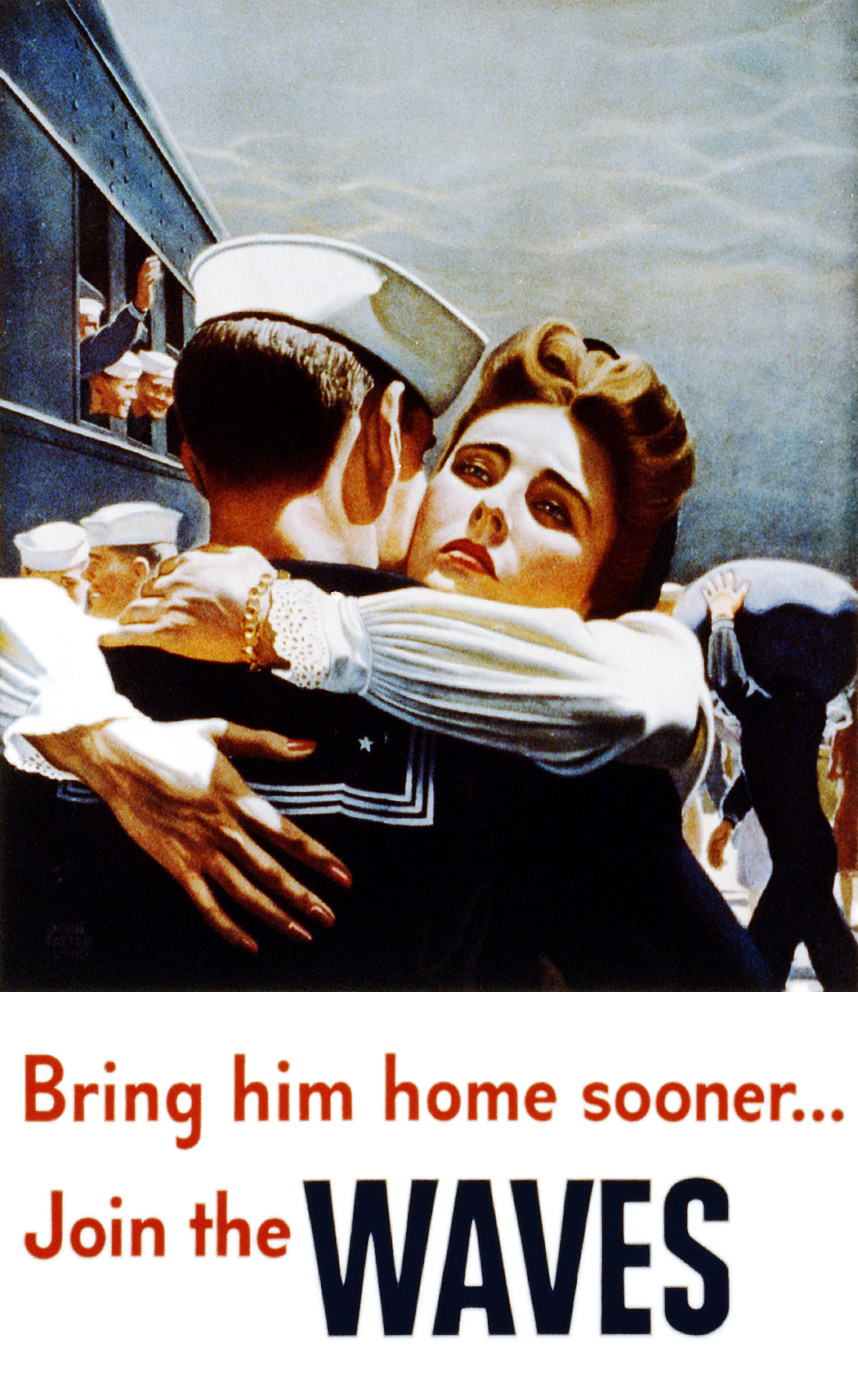
A poster promoting women enlist in the WAVES branch of the United States Navy Reserve

The female war worker was commonly used as a symbol of the home front, perhaps because, unlike a male figure, the question of why she was not serving in the armed forces would not be raised. In many stories, the woman worker appeared as an example to a selfish woman who then reformed and obtained employment.

Magazines were urged to carry fiction suitable for wartime. For instance, True Story toned down its Great Depression hostility to working women and featured war work favorably. At first, it continued sexual themes, such as female war workers being seduced, having affairs with married men, or engaging in casual affairs. The Magazine Bureau objected to this as hindering recruitment, and argued that war workers should not be shown as more prone to dalliance than other women. As a result, True Story removed such themes from stories featuring female war workers. The ambitious career woman whose life culminated in disaster still appeared, but only when motivated by self-interest; whereas women who worked from patriotic motives were able to maintain their marriages and bear children rather than suffer miscarriages and infertility, as working women invariably suffered in pre-war stories. Stories showed that war work could redeem a woman with a sordid past. Saturday Evening Post changed its depiction of working women even more: the pre-war destructive career wife vanished entirely, and now employed women could also have happy families.

The image of the "glamour girl" was adapted to wartime conditions by depicting women in factory work as attractive and overtly showed that a woman could keep her looks while performing war work. Fictional romances presented war workers as winning the attention of soldiers, in preference to girls who lived for pleasure. The motives for female war workers were often presented as bringing their men home earlier, or making a safer world for their children. Depictions of female war workers often suggested that they were working only for the duration, and planned to return full-time to the home afterward.

The appeal for women workers suggested that by performing war work, a woman supported her brother, boyfriend or husband in the armed forces, and hastened the day when he could return home.

===== In the armed forces =====
Women's groups and organizations were asked to recruit women for the WACS, WAVES, WASPS, and other female branches of the services.

The image of the "glamour girl" was applied to women in the military, to reassure women that joining the military did not make them less feminine. In fictional romances, women in uniform won the hearts of soldiers who preferred them to women who did not support the war effort.

=== African American: Double V campaign ===
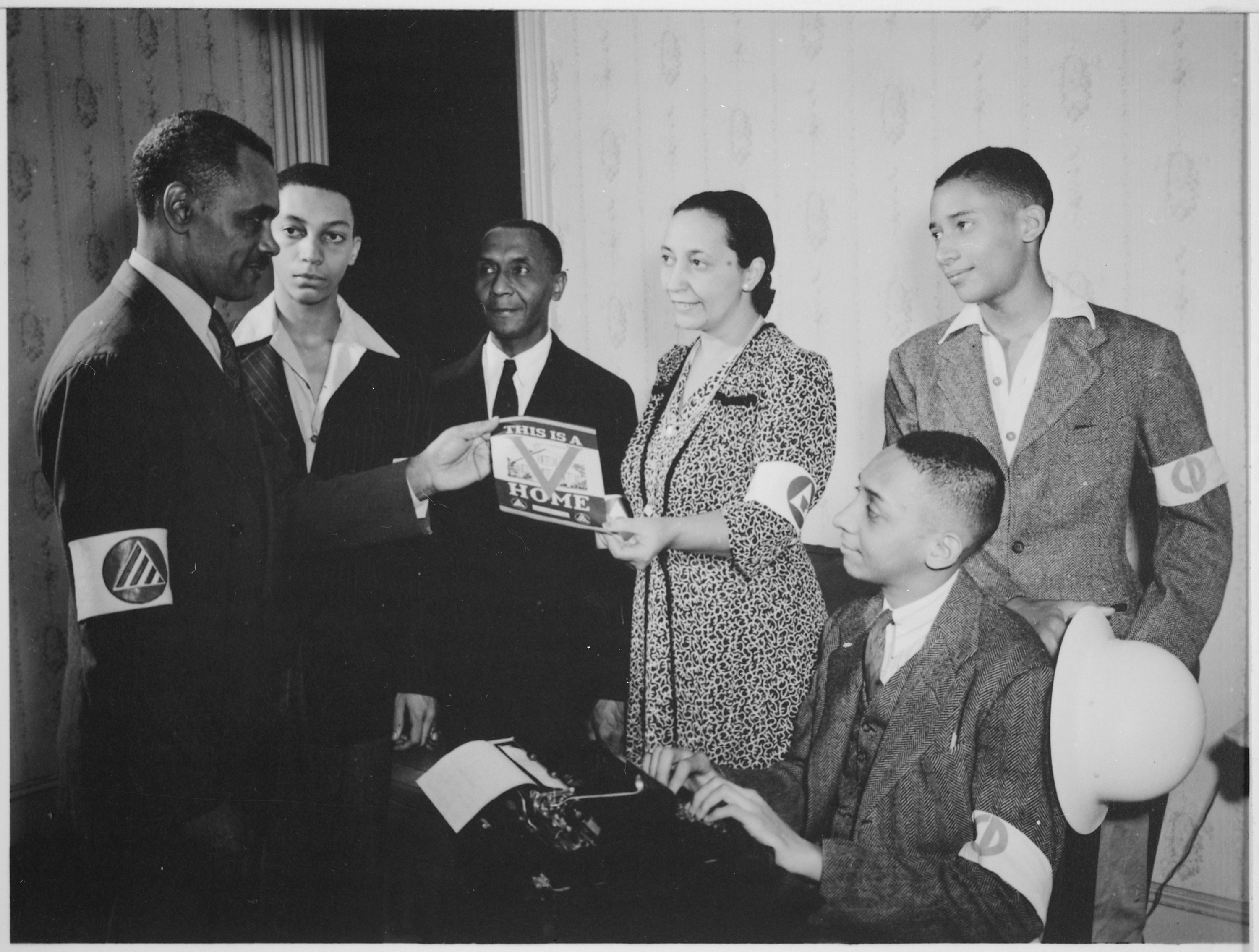
Participants in the Double V campaign, 1942.

The African American community in the United States resolved on a Double V campaign: Victory over fascism abroad, and victory over discrimination at home. Large numbers migrated from poor Southern farms to munitions centers. Racial tensions were high in overcrowded cities like Chicago; Detroit and Harlem experienced race riots in 1943. Black newspapers created the Double V campaign to build black morale and head off radical action. Special posters and pamphlets were prepared for distribution in black neighborhoods.

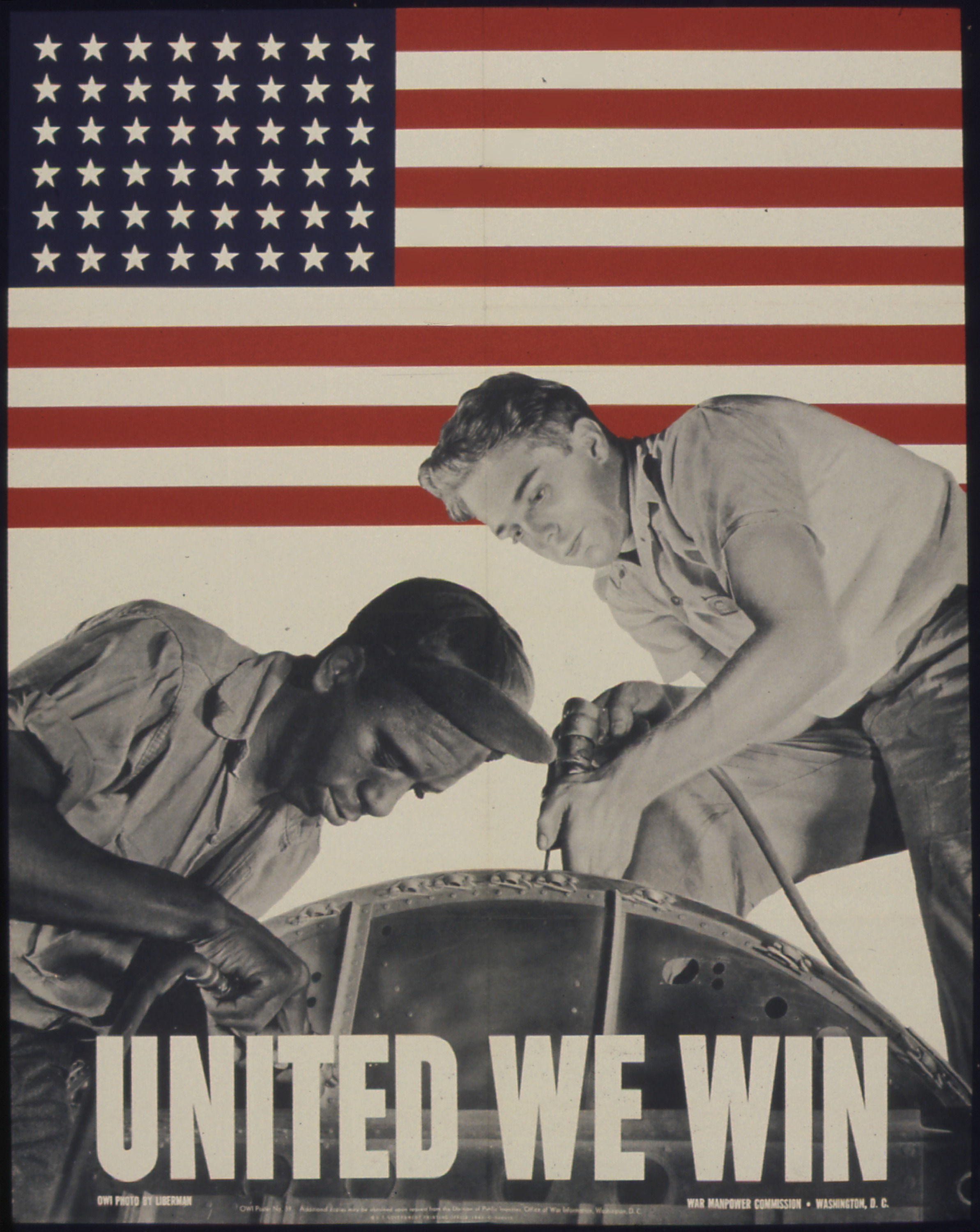
A poster promoting cooperation between Americans of different races in the war effort

Most black women had been farm laborers or domestics before the war. Despite discrimination and segregated facilities throughout the South, they escaped the cotton patch and took blue-collar jobs in the cities. Working with the federal Fair Employment Practices Committee, the NAACP and CIO unions, these black women fought a "Double V" campaign—against the Axis abroad and against restrictive hiring practices at home. Their efforts redefined citizenship, equating their patriotism with war work, and seeking equal employment opportunities, government entitlements, and better working conditions as conditions appropriate for full citizens. In the South black women worked in segregated jobs; in the West and most of the North they were integrated, but wildcat strikes erupted in Detroit, Baltimore, and Evansville where white migrants from the South refused to work alongside black women.

=== Home fires ===
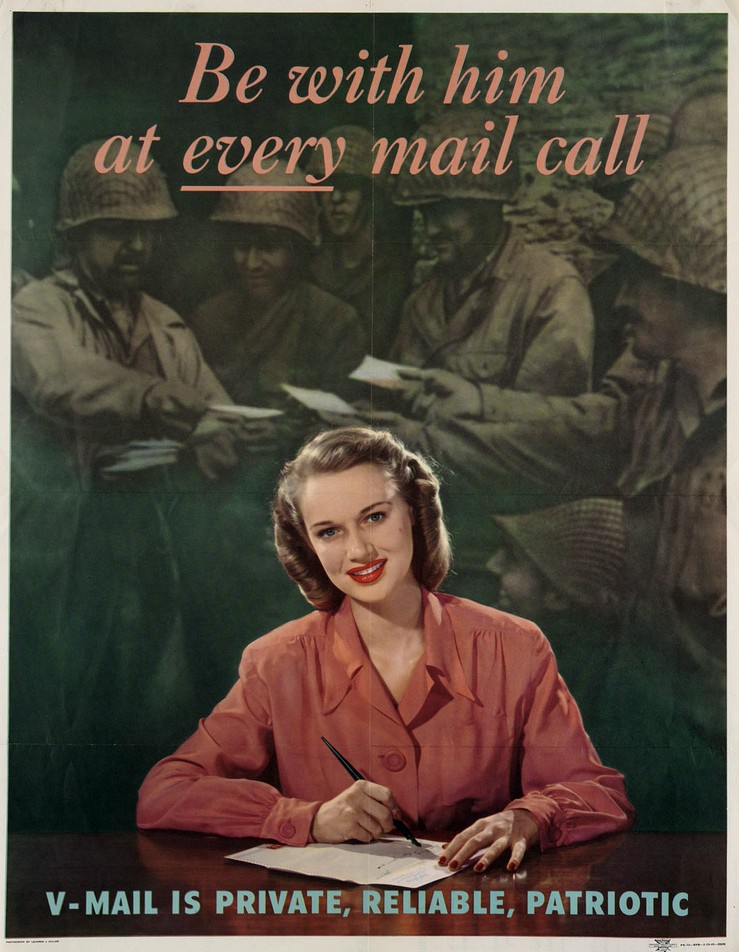
A poster by Lejaren Hiller Sr. directing women to use V-mail to correspond with their sweethearts and family members in the military

Most of the entertainment aimed at soldiers was heavy on sentiment and nostalgia, to help sustain morale. In most media, the girl next door was often used as the symbol of all things American. Betty Grable characterized it as women giving soldiers something to fight for, but one soldier wrote to her saying that her pin-up photographs told them, in the midst of fighting, what they were fighting for. Songs on armed forces request programs were not about Rosie the Riveter, but of the girls who were waiting for the soldiers to return. Many such songs were also popular at the home front. Themes of love, loneliness and separation were given more poignancy by the war.

German intelligence officers, interrogating American prisoners, mistakenly concluded that the Americans' notions of what they were fighting for were for vague concepts, such as "Mom's apple pie," and concluded that American servicemen were idealistically soft and could be convinced to desert their allies.

Stories for the home front recounted the soldiers' need for their sweethearts and families to remain as they were, because they were what the soldier were fighting for. As the war ended, real and fictional stories often featured women who left war work to return to their homes and to raise children. Women, particularly wives whose husbands were at war, and children were often portrayed as what was at risk in the war.

Home-front posters also invoked an idealized America, as in the series declaring "This is America", portraying "the family is a sacred institution," "where Main Street is bigger than Broadway," and "where a man picks his job". Typically, men were presented as ordinary but women as beautiful and glamorous.

=== Allies ===
==== Pro-British ====
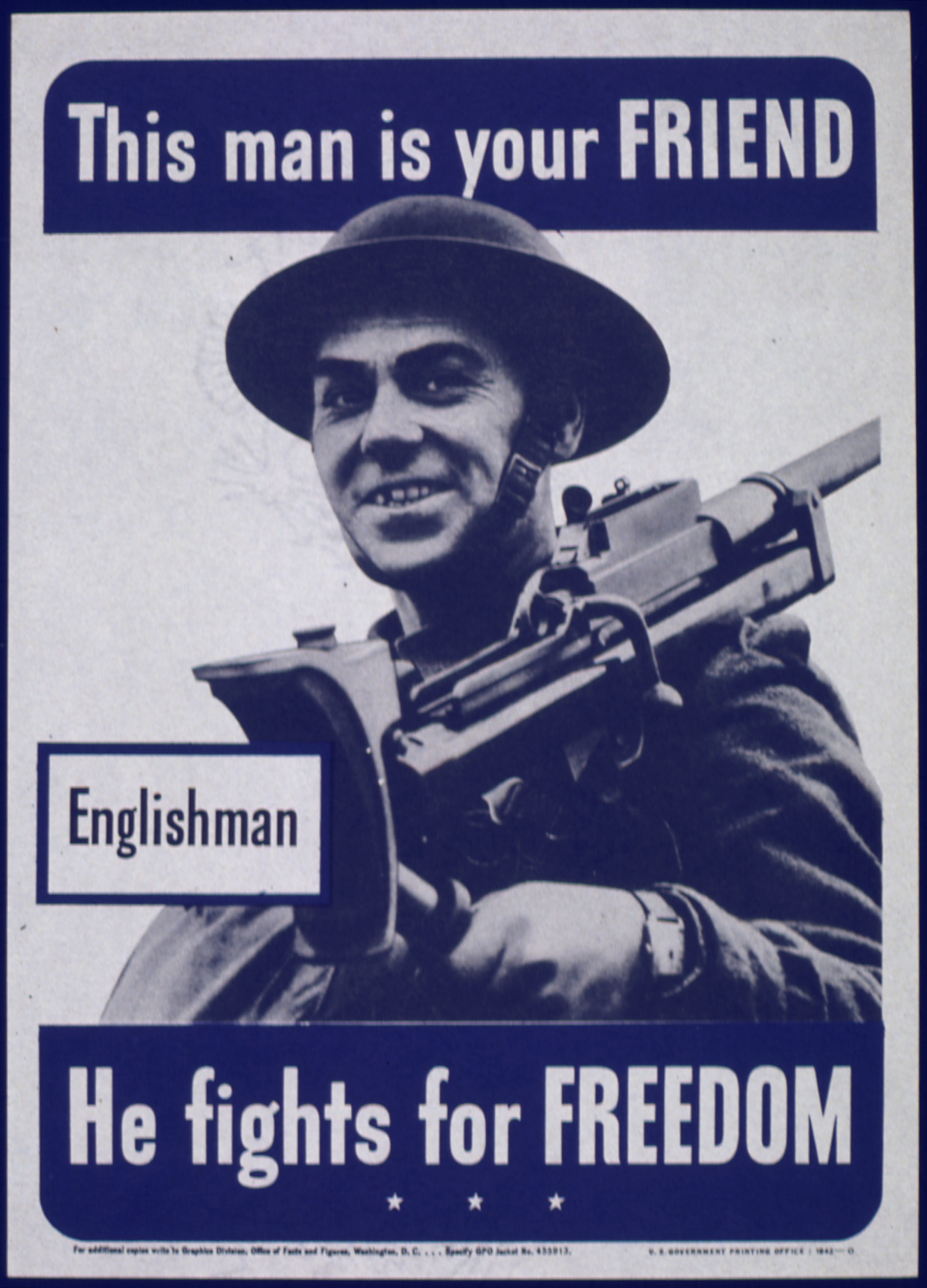
One of many "This man is your FRIEND / He fights for FREEDOM" posters featuring Allied soldiers from different countries; this poster features a British Army soldier

Roosevelt urged support for Britain before the United States entered the war, to gain support for the Lend-Lease Act. Part of this reasoning was that those who were currently fighting the Axis powers would keep war from the United States, if supported.

In propaganda media, posters urged support for Great Britain, while the stock character of the "supercilious Englishman" was removed from film. Newsreels depicted the Blitz, showing the famous St Paul's Survives image of St. Paul's dome rising above the flames, and Ed Murrow reported the effects. Frank Capra's film The Battle of Britain (1943), in the Why We Fight series, depicted the RAF's fight against Germany. While it embellished real life dogfights, it did depict the frightening night raids, which the British people nevertheless managed to carry-on through.

Before 7 December 1941 and the Japanese surprise attack on Hawaii, a number of Americans in the north and mid-west United States were either sympathetic to Nazi Germany or simply opposed to another war with Germany because they were of German ancestry. In addition, numerous Irish-Catholic Americans were pro-Nazi because they were openly hostile to the British and British interests. However, the American South was very pro-British at this time, because of the kinship southerners felt for the British. The South was deemed "a total failure" for the non-interventionist America First Committee for reasons such as traditional southern pride in the military, pro-British sentiment and Anglophilia due to a predominance of British ancestry among most Southerners, political loyalty to the Democratic Party and the role of defense spending in aiding the region's depressed economy.

==== Pro-Soviet ====
Depicting the Soviet Union in American propaganda was a delicate issue throughout the war, as the Soviet Union could not possibly be presented as a liberal democracy.

However, the Nazi attack on the Soviet Union inspired propaganda in its favor, and Hollywood produced pro-Soviet movies. At Roosevelt's urging, the film Mission to Moscow was made and depicted the purge trials as a just punishment of a Trotskyite conspiracy. On the other hand, the 1939 Greta Garbo film Ninotchka was not re-released as it ridiculed Russians.

Frank Capra's Why We Fight series included The Battle of Russia. The first part of the film depicted the Nazi attack on the Soviet Union, recounted past failures to invade Russia, and described Russian scorched earth and guerrilla tactics. It also omitted all references to the pre-War Molotov–Ribbentrop Pact. The second part of the film depicts Germany being drawn too far into Russia; and mostly concentrates on the siege of Leningrad. Indeed, it unrealistically portrays the great withdrawal into Russian territory as a deliberate ploy of the Soviet government.

Stories written in the U.S. or Britain that were critical of the Soviet Union and its policies were often put on hold or not published at all due to the need to maintain friendly relationships with it. One notable example of this was George Orwell's anti-Soviet novel Animal Farm, which was written during the war but could not be published until afterwards.

==== Occupied Europe ====
Frank Capra's films The Nazis Strike and Divide and Conquer, part of the Why We Fight series, depicted the conquest of Europe. The Nazis Strike covers the seizure of land starting with the Anschluss and concluding with the invasion of Poland, as it depicts Hitler creating an enormous military force. Divide and Conquer depicts German conquests in Denmark, Norway, Luxembourg, Belgium, the Netherlands and France. Special attention is given to atrocities, and the French population is depicted as enslaved after the conquest. An American poster depicted Frenchmen with raised hands warning them that German victory meant slavery, starvation and death.

The tragedy of Lidice, shooting of the men and the sending of the women to concentration camps, was also depicted in posters. The Free French also had posters published, urging the American population to support them. The Belgian Information Center had posters declaring that the people of Belgium still resisted.

American propaganda was circulated in occupied countries through the efforts of the underground movements. Stockpiled books were shipped to France within weeks of D-Day, in order to counteract Nazi propaganda, particularly anti-American propaganda. This was part of "consolidation propaganda", intended to pacify occupied regions so as to limit the forces needed to occupy; to counter-act Nazi propaganda, particularly about the United States; and to explain what the United States had done during the war.

==== Pro-Chinese ====
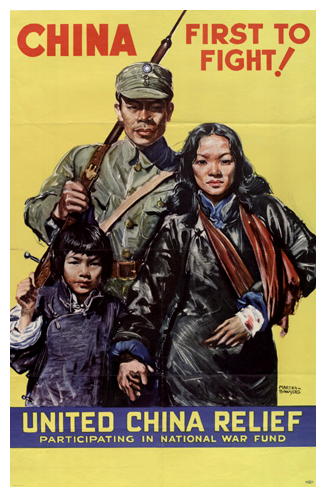
A poster promoting China's fight against Japan in the Second Sino-Japanese War, the start of which (1937) predated the war against Nazi Germany and Fascist Italy

Support for the Chinese people was urged in posters. Even prior to the United States' entry into the war, many Chinese figures appeared on the cover of Time. Japanese propaganda attributed this not to any disgust Americans felt for Japanese atrocities in China, but simply to more effective Chinese propaganda.

Frank Capra's Why We Fight series included The Battle of China. It depicted the brutal attack on China by Japan as well as atrocities such as the Rape of Nanking, which helped galvanize Chinese resistance to Japanese occupation. The film also depicted the building of the Burma Road, which helped keep China in the war as the Japanese had occupied most Chinese ports The film ridiculed the Japanese anti-Western propaganda of "co-prosperity" and "co-existence" by reciting these themes over scenes of Japanese atrocities; it was the most stark, "Good vs Evil" film of the Why We Fight series.

Pearl Buck, a famous author of books on China, warned Americans to take seriously the appeal of the Japanese Greater East Asia Co-Prosperity Sphere to the people of China and other Asian nations. This was due to those people being treated as inferior races, an attitude many in the West had toward Asians. Elmer Davis of the Office of War Information also declared that since the Japanese were proclaiming the Pacific conflict as a racial war, the United States could only counter this propaganda by deeds that showed Americans believed in the equality of races. However, this was not officially addressed, and American propaganda did not confront the problem of prejudice based on color.

==== Pro-Filipino ====
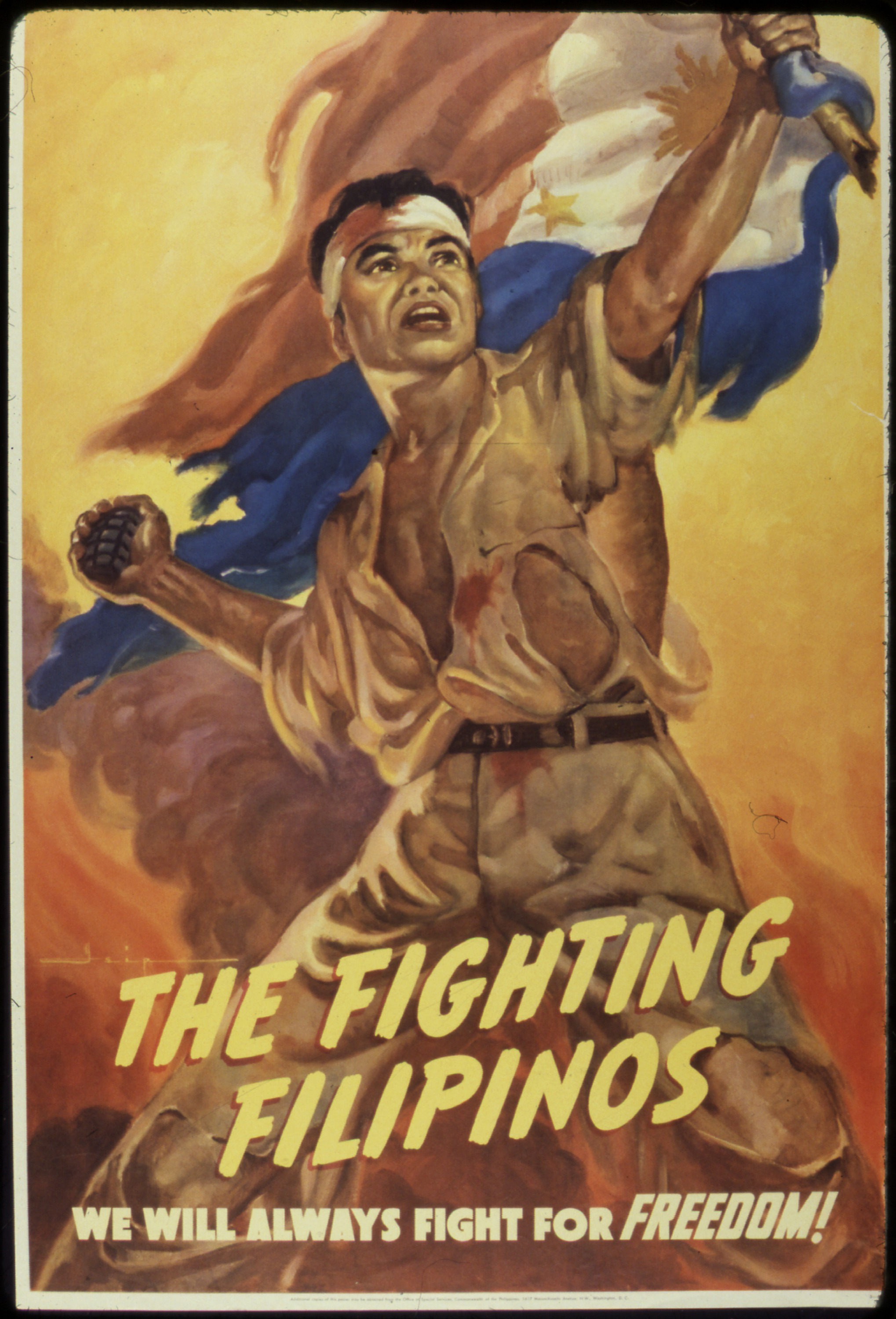
A poster supporting the Philippine resistance against Japan

Posters were used to portray and support the Filipino resistance forces, which, while often listed as one of the greatest organized resistances in history, also exacted a terrible toll on the Filipino people.

== See also ==
Don't Be a Sucker (1943), full film

- United States home front during World War II
- British propaganda during World War II
- British Security Coordination
- List of Allied propaganda films of World War II
- Propaganda in Nazi Germany
- Propaganda in Japan during the Second Sino-Japanese War and World War II
- Propaganda in the Soviet Union
- Propaganda in the United States
- Propaganda in Fascist Italy
- Walt Disney's World War II propaganda production
- World War II political cartoons
