= History of propaganda =

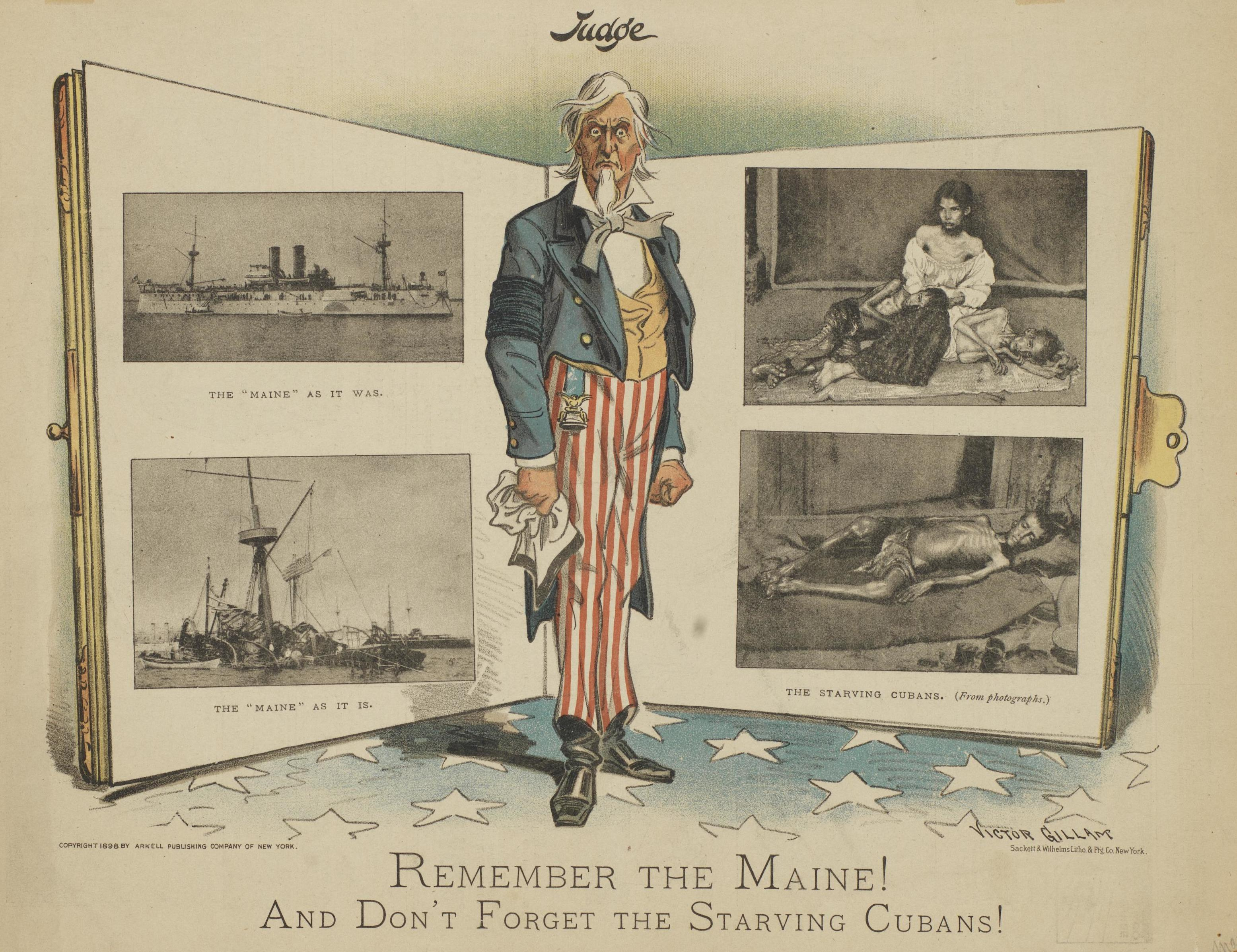
American cartoon, published in 1898: "Remember the Maine! And Don't Forget the Starving Cubans!" Used to encourage support for American intervention in the Cuban War of Independence.

Propaganda is a form of communication that aims to shape people's beliefs, actions and behaviours. It is generally not impartial, and is hence viewed as a means of persuasion. It is often biased, misleading, or even false to promote a specific agenda or perspective. Propagandists use various techniques to manipulate people's opinions, including selective presentation of facts, the omission of relevant information, and the use of emotionally charged language. Propaganda has been widely used throughout history for largely financial, military as well as political purposes, with mixed outcomes.

Propaganda can take many forms, including political speeches, advertisements, news reports, and social media posts. Its goal is usually to influence people's attitudes and behaviors, either by promoting a particular ideology or by persuading them to take a specific action. The term propaganda has acquired a strongly negative connotation by association with its most manipulative and jingoistic examples.

== Pre-modern precedents ==
Primitive forms of propaganda have been a human activity as far back as reliable recorded evidence exists. In the New Kingdom of Egypt's military ideology, the concept of a "Clean Victory" functioned as a strategic form of state propaganda, emphasizing the preservation of Ma’at (cosmic order) rather than faithfully recording the realities of war. Egyptologists observe that temple reliefs were carefully regulated to omit depictions of violence against non-combatants, instead framing the Pharaoh as an ideal masculine protector whose disciplined forces avoided the chaotic excesses seen in contemporary Near Eastern records. This sanitised record was often paired with the active rewriting of history, most notably in Ramesses II's accounts of the Battle of Kadesh, where a tactical stalemate was re-imagined as a unilateral triumph achieved through the King's sole divine intervention. To reinforce this hierarchy, artists utilised hierarchical scaling, depicting the Pharaoh as vastly larger than both his enemies and his own troops to visually manifest his supreme authority. Ultimately, these displays functioned as symbolic warfare; iconic motifs like the smiting of the enemy, are associated with the Pharaoh's role in crushing chaos and preserving the Egyptian state.

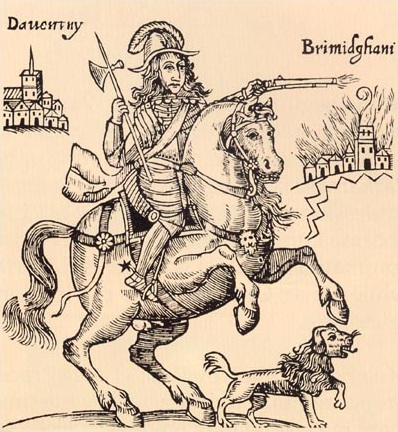
English Civil War cartoon titled "The Cruel Practices of Prince Rupert" (1643)

The Behistun Inscription (c. 515 BC) detailing the rise of Darius I to the Persian throne is viewed by most historians as an early example of propaganda. The Arthashastra written by Chanakya (c. 350 – 283 BC), a professor of political science at Takshashila University and a prime minister of the Maurya Empire in ancient India, discusses propaganda in detail, such as how to spread propaganda and how to apply it in warfare. His student Chandragupta Maurya (c. 340 – 293 BC), founder of the Maurya Empire, employed these methods during his rise to power.

The best-known originator of Roman historiography was Quintus Fabius Pictor (3rd century BCE). His style of writing history defending the Roman state actions and using propaganda heavily eventually became a defining characteristic of Roman historiography. The Roman Civil Wars (44–30 BCE) saw Octavian and Mark Antony accusing each other of obscure and dishonorable origins, cruelty, cowardice, incompetence in oratory and literature, debauchery, excessive luxury, drunkenness, and other slanders. This defamation took the form of uituperatio (Roman rhetorical genre of the invective) which was decisive for shaping the Roman public opinion at this time.

Another example of early propaganda is the 12th-century work, The War of the Irish with the Foreigners, written by the Dál gCais to portray themselves as legitimate rulers of Ireland.

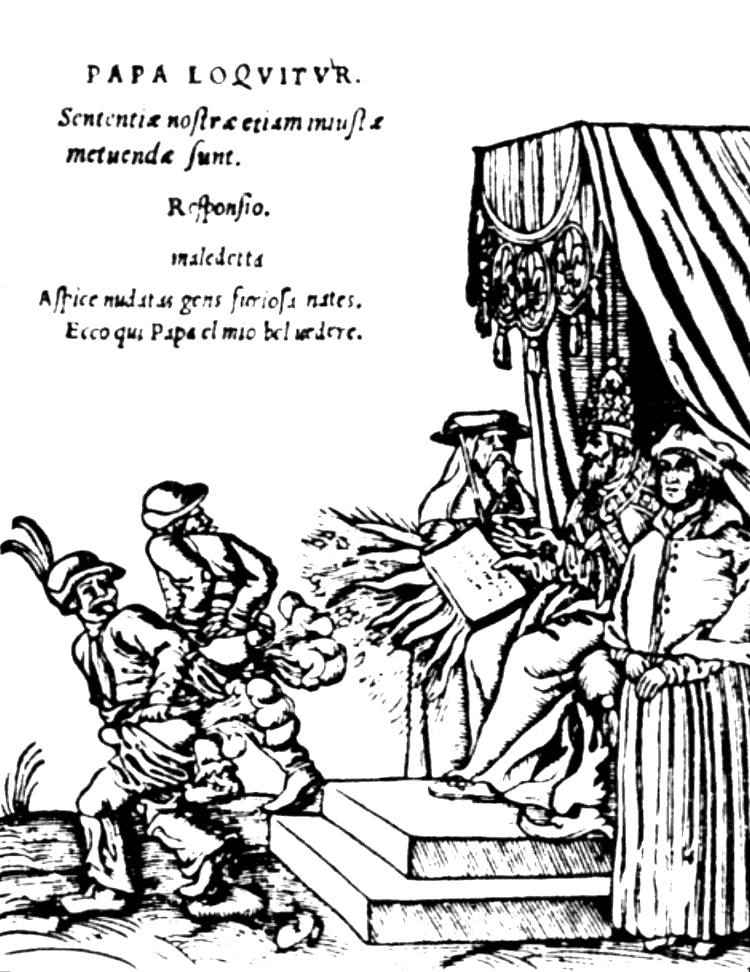
The Pope as Antichrist, from a series of German woodcuts (1545) usually referred to as the Papstspotbilder or Papstspottbilder in German or Depictions of the Papacy, by Lucas Cranach, commissioned by Martin Luther. German peasants respond to a papal bull of Pope Paul III. Caption reads: "Don't frighten us Pope, with your ban, and don't be such a furious man. Otherwise we shall turn away and show you our rears." Title: Kissing the Pope's Feet.

Holy Roman Emperor Maximilian I was the first ruler to utilize the power of the printing press for propaganda – in order to build his image, stir up patriotic feelings in the population of his empire. He was the first ruler who utilized one-sided battle reports – the early predecessors of modern newspapers or neue zeitungen – targeting the mass. and influence the population of his enemies.

Propaganda during the Reformation, helped by the spread of the printing press throughout Europe, and in particular within Germany, caused new ideas, thoughts, and doctrine to be made available to the public in ways that had never been seen before the 16th century. The printing press was invented in approximately 1450 and quickly spread to other major cities around Europe; by the time the Reformation was underway in 1517 there were printing centres in over 200 of the major European cities. These centres became the primary producers of both Reformation works by the Protestant Reformers and anti-Reformation works put forth by the Roman Catholics.

The modern uses of propaganda were initially witnessed during the 17th century, when Pope Gregory XV established a dicastery in 1622, composed of a cardinal commission who were mandated with expanding the faith along with regulation of church affairs in primitive-judged areas. A College of Propaganda was later founded by Pope Urban VIII under the Bull "Immortalis Dei Filius" in 1627, with the aim of training priests for foreign missions.

During the U.S.'s Colonial period, religious writers and trading companies circulated glowing tracts urging settlement in the Americas, but often left out the risk and perils. During the era of the American Revolution, the American colonies had a flourishing network of newspapers and printers which specialized in the topic on behalf of the Patriots (and to a lesser extent on behalf of the Loyalists). The most famous single publication was Common Sense, a 1776 pamphlet by Thomas Paine that played a major role in articulating the demand for independence. On occasion, outright disinformation was used, as when Benjamin Franklin circulated false stories of atrocities committed by the Seneca Indians in league with the British. Later, The Federalist Papers were written under pseudonyms by three framers of the Constitution in order to influence public support for ratification. Thomas Jefferson also frequently practiced propaganda during this era as well.

In the French Revolution and the Napoleonic wars both sides made heavy use of it during military campaigns with media literate. For instance, Secretary of War Henry Dundas and Secretary at War William Windham funded writers to promote English interests. In France, the Girondists distributed broadsheets among enemy troops offering them rewards for desertion.

== 19th century ==
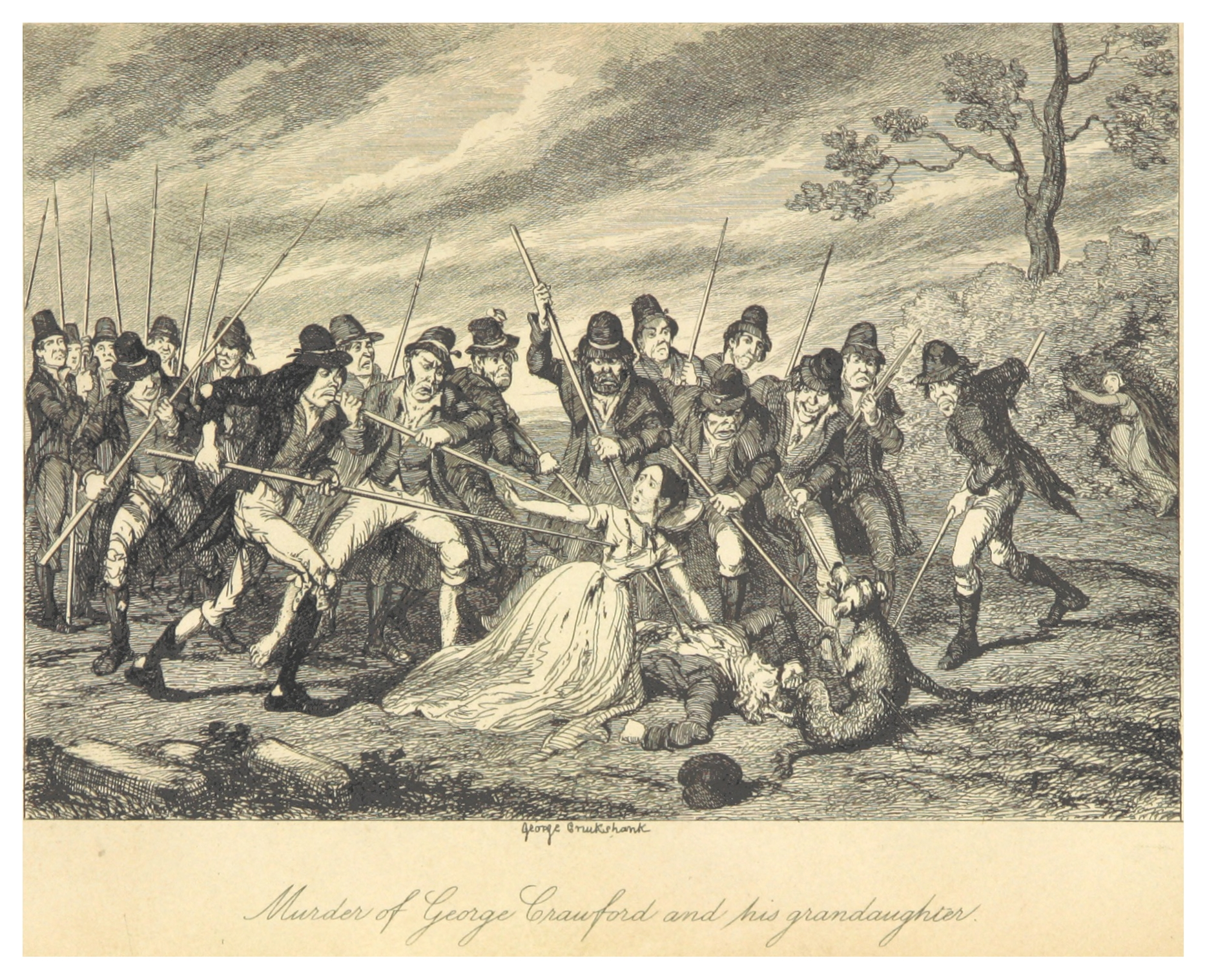
An example of atrocity propaganda: Irish Catholic atrocities committed during the Irish Rebellion of 1798, by George Cruikshank (1845).

Propaganda, as generally understood, is a modern phenomenon that emerged from the creation of literate and politically active societies informed by a mass media, where governments increasingly saw the necessity for swaying public opinion in favour of its policies. The French Revolutionary and Napoleonic Wars produced some of the earliest propaganda of the modern period, with British cartoonists such as James Gillray "devoting [their] entire output to creations of social or political satire, many of which were circulated widely throughout Europe and even in North America." French general and statesman Napoleon also played a major role in developing propaganda, and excelled at garnering public support by capitalizing on his many victories. He often commissioned paintings from French artists for propaganda purposes, including Bonaparte Visiting the Plague Victims of Jaffa, an 1804 painting by Antoine-Jean Gros depicting Napoleon visiting bubonic plague victims in Jaffa which was intended to counter reports of French atrocities during their capture of the city. As historian Garth Jowett noted,

Napoleon quickly learned to exploit the power of the press to his advantage as a political weapon, devising new propaganda techniques that caught his opponents by surprise. Like most other European governments of the time, he maintained domestic censorship, but he went out of his way to plant pro-French items in foreign-language newspapers on the continent. Several newspapers were even founded by the French in occupied German territories, and in Paris a newspaper called the Argus of London appeared, allegedly edited by an Englishman but, in actuality, produced by the French Foreign Office. Supposedly written from an English viewpoint, the newspaper attacked the “war-mongering journals” back in London and was widely distributed throughout the West Indies and to British prisoners of war in places such as Verdun. Napoleon also made wide use of leaflets distributed before his invading armies; he projected a promise of French “liberty” to countries such as Italy, where oppression had been the normal political way of life and a hint of freedom was bound to create widespread excitement.

During the Indian Rebellion of 1857, a revolt against the East India Company's rule of the Indian subcontinent, allegations of rape committed by rebels against European females were published by the British media, including several prominent newspapers. It was later discovered that many of these accounts were intentionally false stories created to incite hostility against the rebels, and historians have noted that was no evidence that any rebel raped European women or girls. An account by The Times which claimed 48 European girls as young as 10–14 were raped by rebels in Delhi during the revolt was criticised as a false propaganda story by Karl Marx, who pointed out that the story was reported by an Anglican clergyman in Bangalore, far from the events of the rebellion.

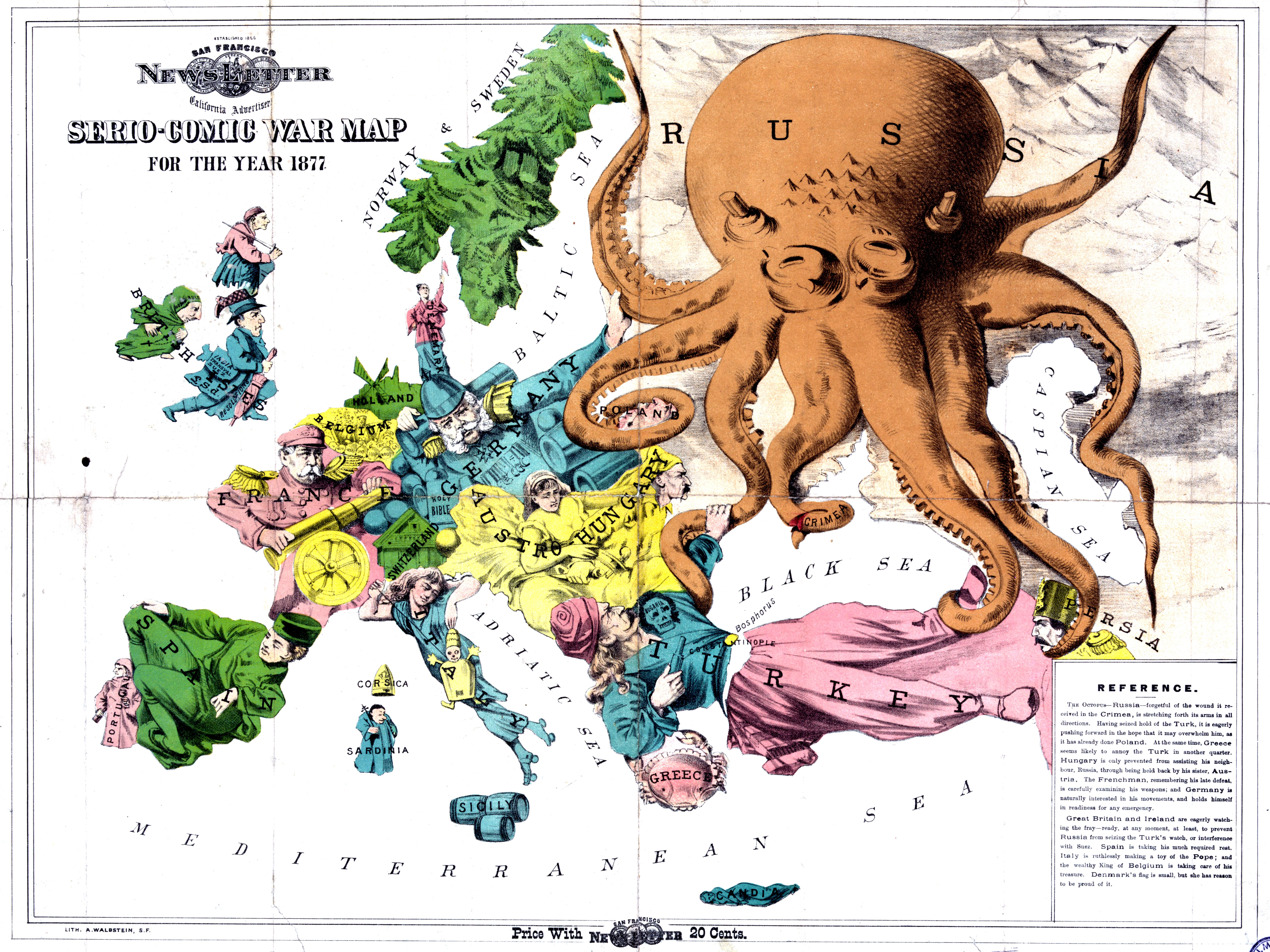
The Russian menace, a British cartoon from 1877 showing Russia as an octopus devouring neighboring lands, especially the Ottoman Empire.

In the U.S. prior to the Civil War, the Know Nothing party targeted groups with propaganda such as Chinese, Irish, German, and Italian immigrants. Slavery proponents and abolitionists both disseminated their ideas through literature and lobbying. Early anti-slavery periodicals included Anti-Slavery Reporter and Freedom's Journal (1827–1829), the last attacking the "return to Africa" colonization programs favored by many prominent politicians. Activists such as William Lloyd Garrison and Theodore Dwight Weld were very effective in anti-slavery societies' writings in winning over public opinion. On the pro-slavery side, the Ostend Manifesto (October 18, 1854) made a case for acquiring Cuba as a slave state, as a way of getting around the Missouri Compromise. In the wake of Dred Scott v. Sandford (1857), several books were written to bolster the decision. For instance, George Fitzhugh's Cannibals All!, or Slaves Without Masters argued that the master–slave relationship was better than wage-slavery under capitalist exploitation. Another, Frederick A. Ross's Slavery Ordained of God, used divine will to justify slavery and controversially equated slavery to the treatment of women (i.e., both slaves and women are children). Lastly came Augusta Jane Evans Wilson's Macaria; or, Altars of Sacrifice (1864), popular in the North and South, persuasively defended Confederate policy and predicted horrible consequences if the slaves were freed.

In the late 19th and early 20th centuries, propaganda techniques became more refined and effective due to, on the one hand, the growth of new communication technologies (e.g. underseas cables, wireless radio, silent motion pictures), and on the other, the development of modern advertising and public relations. Gabriel Tarde's Laws of Imitation (1890) and Gustave Le Bon's The Crowd: A Study of the Popular Mind (1897) were two of the first codifications of propaganda techniques, which influenced many writers afterward, including Sigmund Freud. Hitler's Mein Kampf is heavily influenced by Le Bon's theories. One prominent illustrator of propaganda in the 19th century was Thomas Nast, whose works were recognised as heavily effective in the United States.

== First World War ==
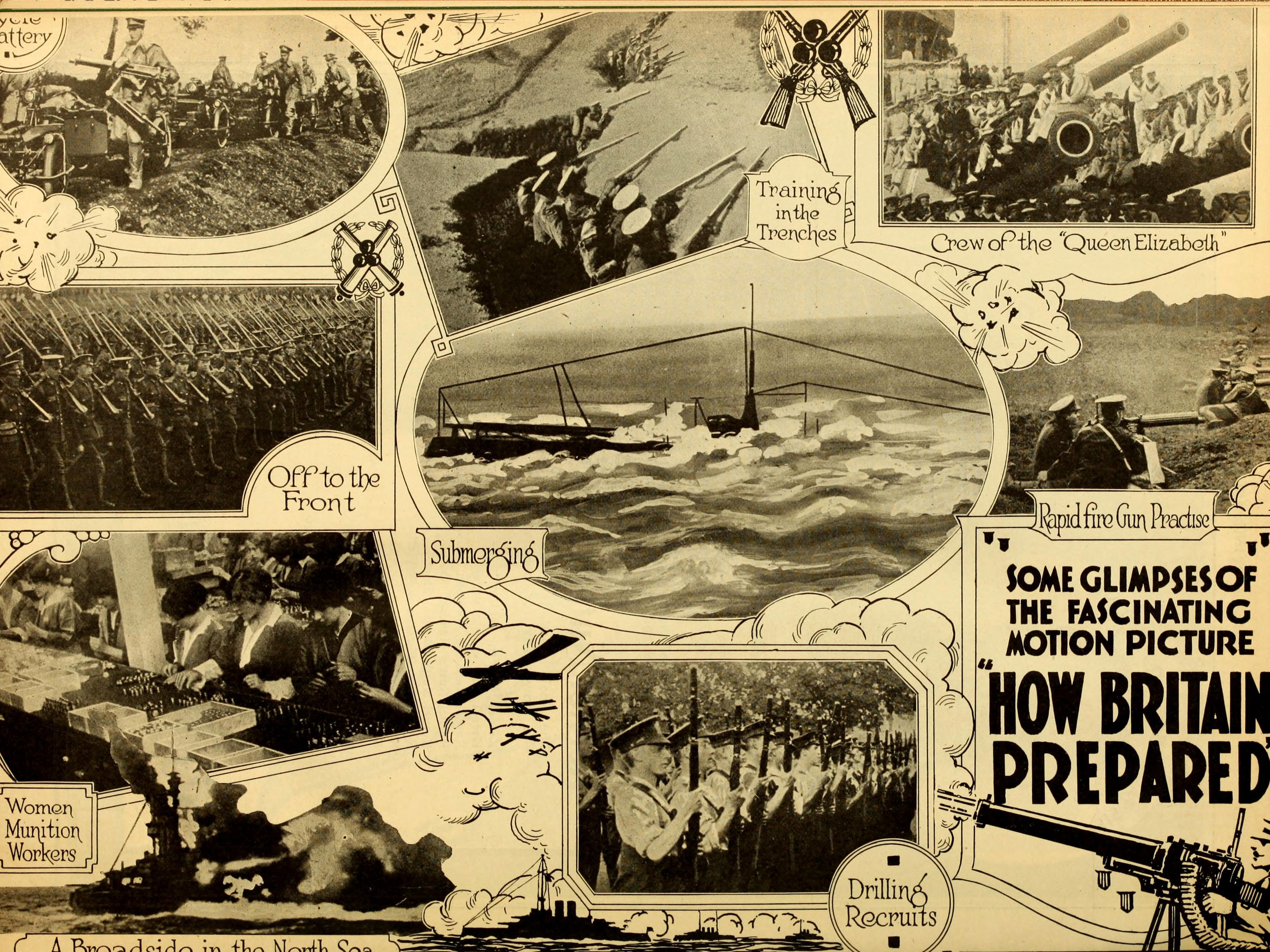
How Britain Prepared, 1915 film

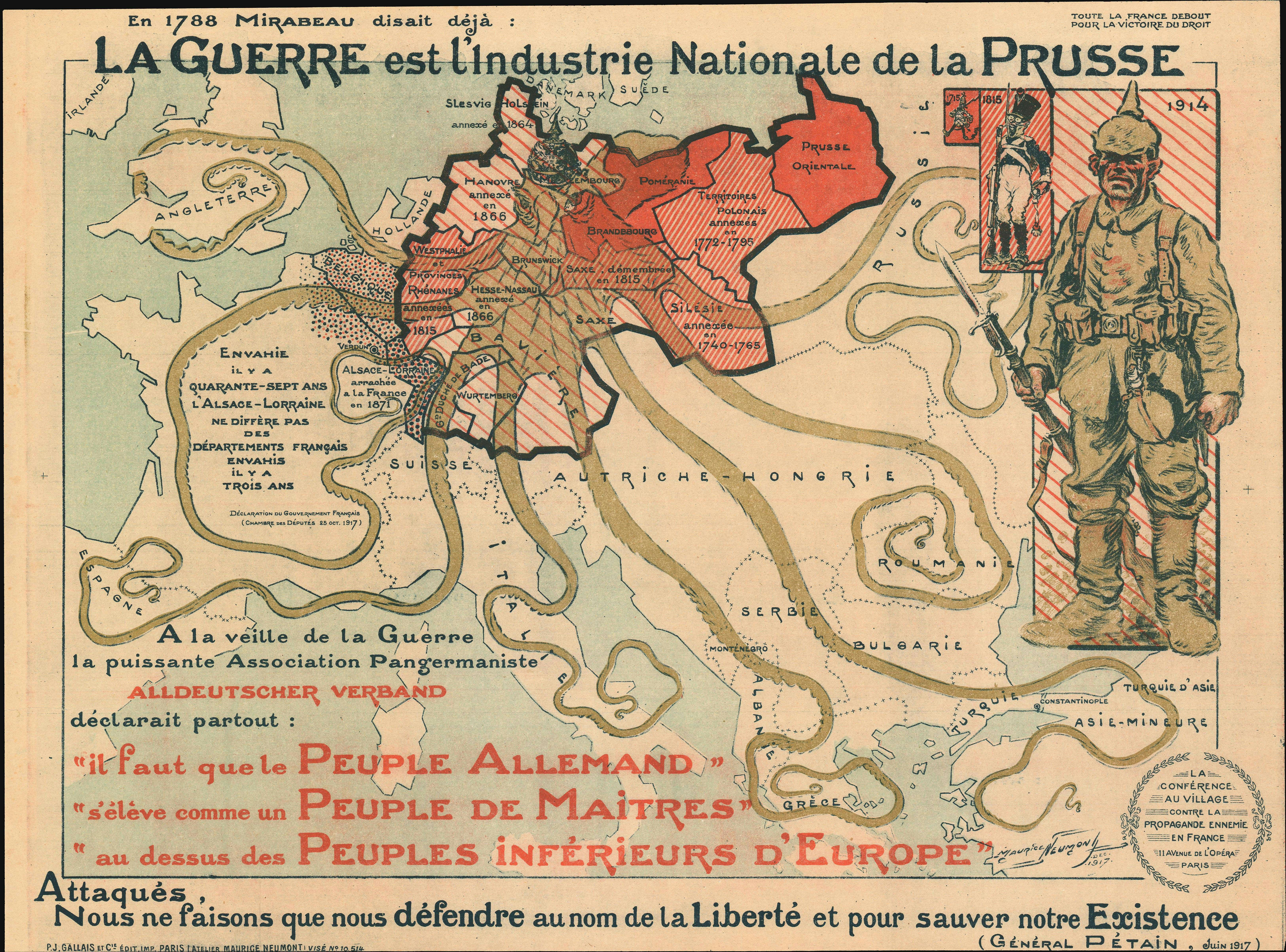
French propaganda poster showing Germany as an octopus devouring neighboring lands, 1917

The first large-scale and organised propagation of government propaganda was occasioned by the outbreak of war in 1914. In the war's initial stages, propaganda output was greatly increased by the British and German governments, to persuade their populace in the justness of their cause, to encourage voluntary recruitment, and above all to demonise the enemy. Heavy use was made of posters, as well as the new medium of film.

=== Germany ===
At the start of the war, Germany expanded its unofficial propaganda machinery, establishing the Central Office for Foreign Services, which among other duties was tasked with propaganda distribution to neutral nations, persuading them to either side with Germany or to maintain their stance of neutrality. After the declaration of war, Britain immediately cut the undersea communications cables that connected Germany to the outside world, thereby cutting off a major propaganda outlet. The Germans relied instead on the powerful wireless Nauen Transmitter Station to broadcast pro-German news reports to the world. Among other techniques used to keep up the morale of the troops, mobile cinemas were regularly dispatched to the front line for the entertainment of the troops. Newsreels would portray current events with a pro-German slant. German propaganda techniques heavily relied on emphasising the mythological and martial nature of the Germanic 'Volk' and the inevitability of its triumph.

Germany published several newspapers and magazines for the occupied areas. The 'Gazette des Ardennes,' was designed for French readers in Belgium and France, Francophone prisoners of war, and generally as a propaganda vehicle in neutral and even enemy countries. Editor Fritz H. Schnitzer had a relatively free hand, and he tried to enhance his credibility by factual information. He realized until the closing days of the war that it was necessary to produce an increasingly optimistic report to hide the weakening position of the Central Powers in the summer and fall of 1918.

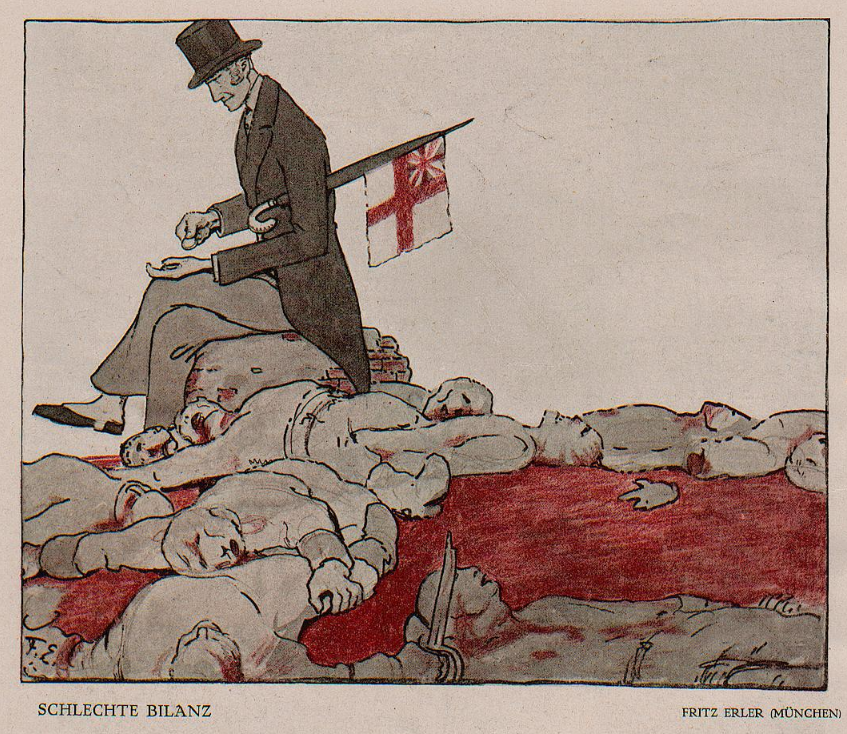
German anti-British propaganda, 1914

The British made a careful analysis of the German propaganda campaigns. In terms of content, the official propaganda had multiple themes: A) It proclaimed that German victory was a certainty. B) It explained Germany was fighting a war of defence. C) Enemy atrocities in were denounced, including its starvation plan for German civilians, use of dum dum bullets, and the use of black soldiers. D) The rhetoric exalted Germany's historic mission to promote high culture and true civilization, celebrating the slogan "work, order, duty" over the enemy's "liberty, equality, fraternity." E). It explained that German victory would benefit all of mankind, freeing the seas for all nations, and enabling the downtrodden colonies of the Allies to liberate themselves. F). Germany needed to land to expand, as an outlet for its surplus population, talent, organizing ability, financial capital, and manufacturing output. G). The riches of the world, especially raw materials, controlled by the British and the French, must be disgorged by the enemy to the benefit of Germany. The propaganda designed for the home market included points A through G. Propaganda directed at neutral opinion downplayed D and F, and left out theme G. The Germans realized they needed to appeal to vocal supporters in countries allied with the Central Powers, especially Austria, Bulgaria, and Turkey. They put special emphasis on the Muslim world, using Turkey as their leverage. Much of the propaganda was oriented toward minorities in the Allied countries, as they tried to stir up Muslims in India and Russia and ethnic groups in Eastern Europe, especially the Poles. In prioritizing the goal of destabilizing the enemy, Berlin realized that it was often counterproductive to promote German glories. Other elements that were hostile or indifferent to Germany, especially among the far left and the Muslims, could best be reached through their own spokesman. Hence large sums—upwards of nine tons of gold—were given the Bolsheviks to spread their own anti-tsarist propaganda.

=== Britain ===
British propaganda during World War I — called "an impressive exercise in improvisation" — was hastily expanded at the beginning of the war and was rapidly brought under government control as the War Propaganda Bureau (Wellington House), under the overall leadership of journalist Charles Masterman. The Bureau began its propaganda campaign on 2 September 1914 when Masterman invited 25 leading British authors to Wellington House to discuss ways of best promoting Britain's interests during the war. Those who attended included William Archer, Arthur Conan Doyle, Arnold Bennett, John Masefield, Ford Madox Ford, G. K. Chesterton, Henry Newbolt, John Galsworthy, Thomas Hardy, Rudyard Kipling, Gilbert Parker, G. M. Trevelyan and H. G. Wells. Several of the writers agreed to write pamphlets and books that would promote the government's point of view; these were printed and published by such well-known publishers as Hodder & Stoughton, Methuen, Oxford University Press, John Murray, Macmillan and Thomas Nelson.

1914 "Lord Kitchener Wants You!" poster

After January 1916 the Bureau's activities were subsumed under the office of the Secretary of State for Foreign Affairs. In May 1916 Masterman began recruiting artists, including Muirhead Bone, Francis Dodd, Eric Kennington and others, to paint pictures of the war in France and the home front. In early 1918 it was decided that a senior government figure should take over responsibility for propaganda and on 4 March Lord Beaverbrook, owner of the Daily Express newspaper, was made Minister of Information. The British effort soon far surpassed the German in its quality and ability to sway the public mood both at home and abroad.

A variety of propaganda methods were used by the British during the war, with emphasis on the need for credibility. Written forms of distributed propaganda included books, pamphlets, official publications, ministerial speeches or royal messages. They were targeted at influential individuals, such as journalists and politicians, rather than a mass audience. Pamphlets were distributed to various foreign countries, primarily the United States: – these pamphlets were academic in tone and factual in nature, distributed through unofficial channels. By 1916, 7 million copies had been circulated by Wellington House in various languages.

British propagandists also sought to influence the foreign press, by providing it with information through the Neutral Press Committee and the Foreign Office. Special telegraph agencies were established in various European cities, including Bucharest, Bilbao and Amsterdam, in order to facilitate the spread of information.

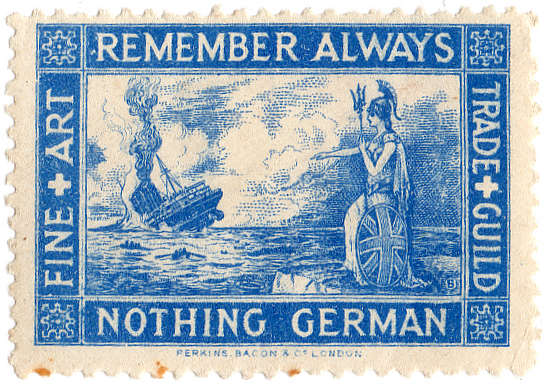
British anti-German propaganda stamp, pointing out unrestricted submarine warfare

Recruitment was a central theme of domestic propaganda until the introduction of conscription in January 1916. The most common theme for recruitment posters was patriotism, which evolved into appeals for people to do their 'fair share'. Among the most famous of the posters used in the British Army recruitment campaign of World War I were the "Lord Kitchener Wants You" posters, which depicted Secretary of State for War Lord Kitchener above the words "WANTS YOU".

One major propaganda avenue was the use of atrocity stories. These aimed to mobilise hatred of the German enemy by spreading details of their atrocities, real or alleged, and was used extensively by Britain, reaching a peak in 1915, with much of the atrocities related to Germany's invasion of Belgium. One of the first significant publications to be produced by the Bureau was the Report on Alleged German Outrages, in early 1915. This pamphlet documented atrocities both actual and alleged committed by the German army against Belgian civilians. Other atrocity stories included the fate of the nurse Edith Cavell and the Sinking of the RMS Lusitania. These had a significant impact both in Britain and in America, making front-page headlines in major newspapers.

=== United States ===
Anti-German propaganda in World War I, c. 1917

Before the United States declared war in 1917, the Woodrow Wilson administration established a propaganda department along similar lines. Propaganda experts Walter Lippmann and Edward Bernays participated in the Committee on Public Information (CPI), which was tasked with swaying popular opinion to encourage enlistment and war bond sales. The CPI deployed posters, films, and provided themes for speeches by "four-minute men" at public functions, and also encouraged censorship of the American press. The American press played an unwitting role too by relying on daily war news cables controlled by the British government and by spreading false stories of German atrocities in Belgium and German-occupied eastern France supplied by the British as well. Starting after World War I, propaganda had a growing negative connotation. This was due in part to the 1920 book How We Advertised America: the First Telling of the Amazing Story of the Committee on Public Information that Carried the Gospel of Americanism to Every Corner of the Globe in which the impact of the CPI, and the power of propaganda, was overemphasised. Also, exposure of fact that the atrocity stories were false created public distrust. The CPI was so unpopular that after the war, Congress closed it down without providing funding to organise and archive its papers. The war propaganda campaign of the CPI "produced within six months such an intense anti-German hysteria as to permanently impress American business (and Adolf Hitler, among others) with the potential of large-scale propaganda to control public opinion." The use of film by the U.S. Signal Corps and the Committee on Public Information during World War features in the documentary "Mobilizing Movies!" (2017).

During World War I, the U.S. government utilised extensive propaganda to demonize Germany and its people, portraying them as the embodiment of evil. This anti-German sentiment was fueled by the Committee on Public Information (CPI), which spread messages through films, posters, speeches, and other media. The CPI played a key role in framing Germans as "Huns" and fostering a fear-driven atmosphere that justified U.S. involvement in the war. This propaganda effort also extended to influencing international media, with CPI offices set up in various countries. One significant outcome of the war's anti-German propaganda was its intersection with the push for Prohibition. German-American brewers, such as Pabst and Schlitz, were vilified as threats to the war effort, and beer became associated with unpatriotic behavior. Wartime rationing of grain provided a practical argument for limiting alcohol production, which was portrayed as a misuse of resources needed for the war effort. This set the stage for the eventual ratification of the 18th Amendment in 1919, which instituted Prohibition.

== Russian Revolution ==
=== White propaganda ===
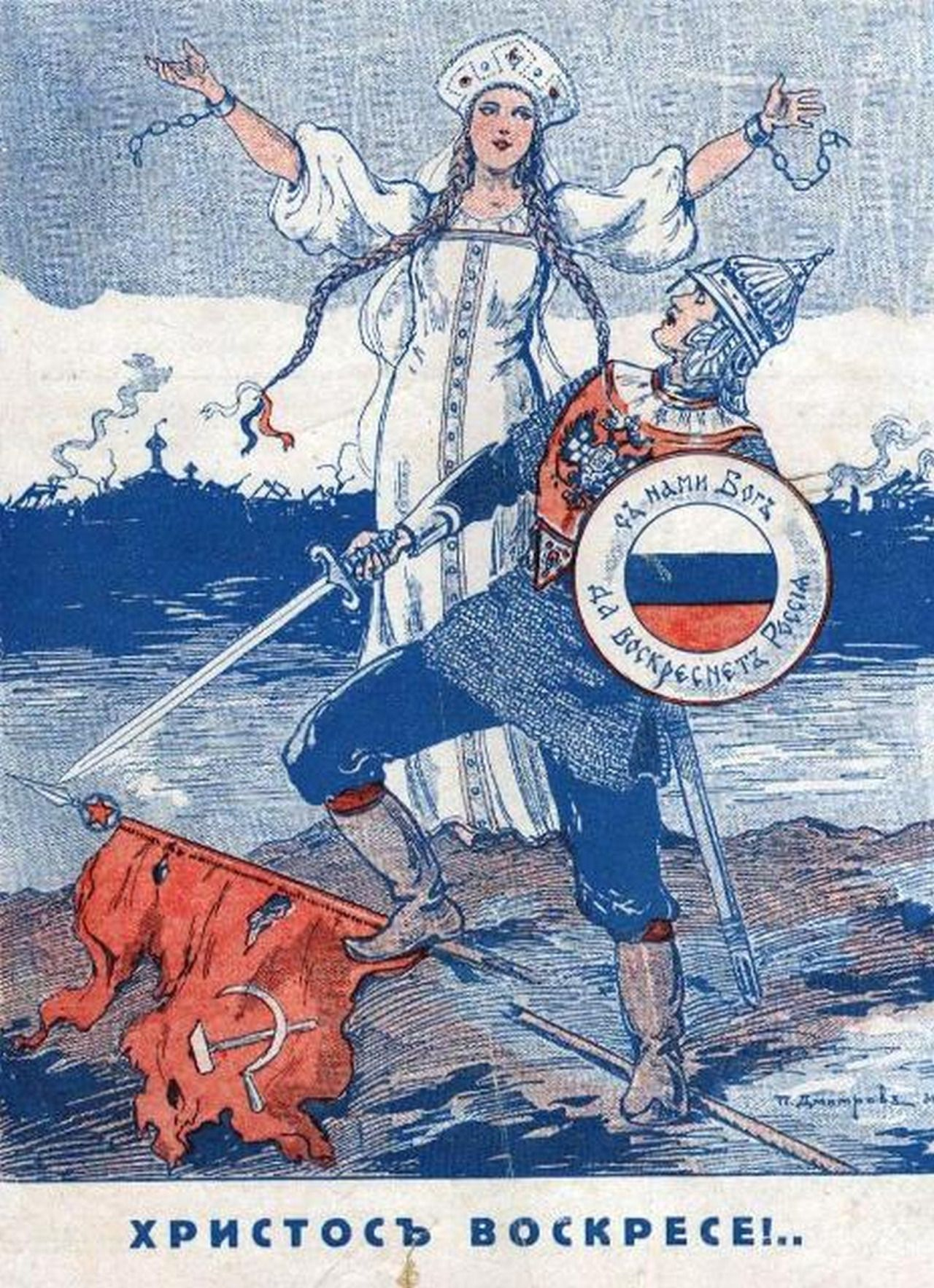
Russian èmigré anti-Bolshevik poster, c. 1932

The Protocols of the Elders of Zion, a fraudulent antisemitic conspiracy text, was first printed in a Black Hundreds newspaper shortly before the Revolution of 1905. It became widely circulated as an explanation for the uprisings. As the 1917 October Revolution unfolded, causing White movement-affiliated Russians to flee to the West, The Protocols was carried along with them and assumed a new purpose. Until then, The Protocols had remained obscure; it now became an instrument for blaming Jews for the Russian Revolution. It was a directly political weapon, used against the Bolsheviks who were depicted as overwhelmingly Jewish, allegedly executing the Judeo-Bolshevist "plan" embodied in The Protocols. The purpose was to discredit communism, prevent the West from recognizing the Soviet Union, and bring about the downfall of Vladimir Lenin's regime.

=== Red propaganda ===
Russian revolutionaries of the 19th and 20th centuries distinguished two different aspects covered by the English term propaganda. Their terminology included two terms: Russian: агитация (agitatsiya), or agitation, and Russian: пропаганда, or propaganda, see agitprop (agitprop is not, however, limited to the Soviet Union, as it was considered, before the October Revolution, to be one of the fundamental activities of any Marxist activist; this importance of agit-prop in Marxist theory may also be observed today in Trotskyist circles, who insist on the importance of leaflet distribution).

Soviet propaganda meant dissemination of revolutionary ideas, teachings of Marxism, and theoretical and practical knowledge of Marxist economics, while agitation meant forming favourable public opinion and stirring up political unrest. These activities did not carry negative connotations (as they usually do in English) and were encouraged. Expanding dimensions of state propaganda, the Bolsheviks actively used transportation such as trains, aircraft and other means.

Joseph Stalin's regime built the largest fixed-wing aircraft of the 1930s, Tupolev ANT-20, exclusively for this purpose. Named after the famous Soviet writer Maxim Gorky who had recently returned from fascist Italy, it was equipped with a powerful radio set called "Voice from the sky", printing and leaflet-dropping machinery, radio stations, photographic laboratory, film projector with sound for showing movies in flight, library, etc. The aircraft could be disassembled and transported by railroad if needed. The giant aircraft set a number of world records.

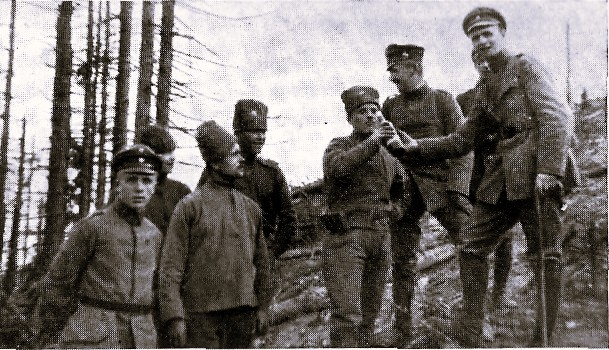
Meeting Germans in No Man's Land (1917)

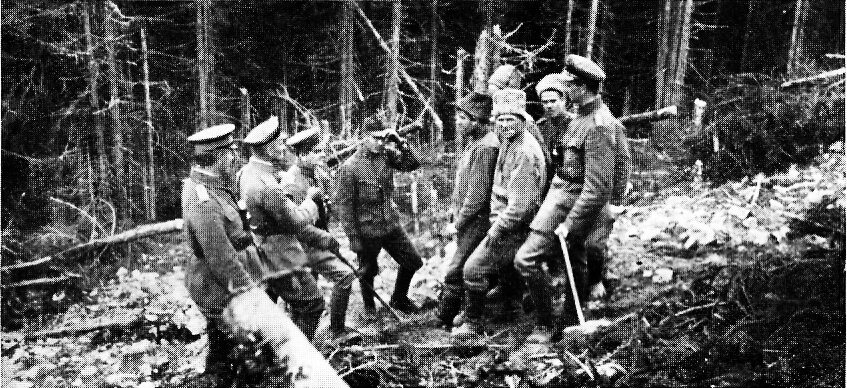
Meeting before the Russian wire entanglements (1917)

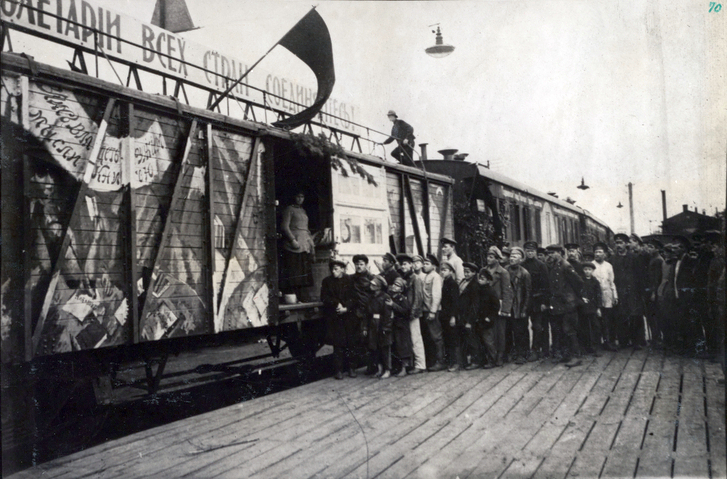
Bolshevik propaganda train, 1923

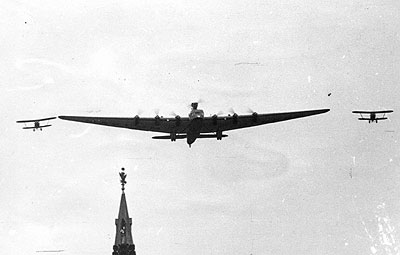
ANT-20 "Maxim Gorky" propaganda aircraft in the Moscow sky

== Post-war ==
Before and during World War I, the clergyman Gerald Lee wrote about "news engineering" as a means of social control, and his second cousin Ivy Lee applied this perspective to his work as a publicist. After the war, propaganda experts returning from national service brought similar perspectives to the study and practice of publicity, helping shape it into the field of public relations.

Edward Bernays's CPI service ended with the dissolution of the American Press Mission to the Paris Peace Conference. Shortly after Bernays returned to the US, an old CPI colleague offered him civilian work as a freelance publicist for the Lithuanian National Council. In 1919, Bernays founded what he called a "publicity direction" firm, hiring fellow publicist and former journalist Doris Fleischman as his first employee. Bernays and Fleischman brought a scientific management approach to publicity. They described their work as the "engineering of consent," seeking to understand and influence "the group mind" through the application of social science and psychology. In his 1923 book Crystallizing Public Opinion, Bernays coined the term public relations counsel for the services that he and Fleischman provided. He later wrote:

The conscious and intelligent manipulation of the organised habits and opinions of the masses is an important element in democratic society. Those who manipulate this unseen mechanism of society constitute an invisible government which is the true ruling power of our country. We are governed, our minds are molded, our tastes formed, our ideas suggested, largely by men we have never heard of. This is a logical result of the way in which our democratic society is organised. Vast numbers of human beings must cooperate in this manner if they are to live together as a smoothly functioning society.

— Propaganda (1928)

Walter Lippmann, returning from his post as an army propagandist, became a strong critic of the CPI. In the early 1920s, he explored the role of journalism and propaganda in democratic societies in his books Liberty and the News, Public Opinion, and The Phantom Public.

The documentary film Century of the Self, by Adam Curtis, explores the influence of these ideas on public relations and politics throughout the 20th century.

According to Alex Carey, one distinctive feature of the 20th century was "the professionalising and institutionalising of propaganda", as it became an increasingly prominent, sophisticated, and self-conscious tactic of both government and business.

The development of radio broadcasting in the early 20th century created new possibilities to spread propaganda, and this led to the creation of the International Convention concerning the Use of Broadcasting in the Cause of Peace, which was meant to prevent propaganda for war. A similar prohibition on propaganda for war was later included in the International Covenant on Civil and Political Rights, which was adopted in 1966, and which also prohibited "advocacy of national, racial or religious hatred that constitutes incitement to discrimination, hostility or violence".

== Nazi Germany ==
After the defeat of Germany in the First World War, military officials such as Erich Ludendorff suggested that British propaganda had been instrumental in their defeat. Adolf Hitler came to echo this view, believing that it had been a primary cause of the collapse of morale and the revolts in the German home front and Navy in 1918 (see also: Dolchstoßlegende). Most propaganda in Germany was produced by the Ministry of Public Enlightenment and Propaganda. Joseph Goebbels was placed in charge of this ministry shortly after Hitler took power in 1933. All journalists, writers and artists were required to register with one of the Ministry's subordinate chambers for the press, fine arts, music, theatre, film, literature or radio.

Hitler met nearly every day with Goebbels to discuss the news, and Goebbels would obtain Hitler's thoughts on the subject. Goebbels then met with senior Ministry officials to pass down the official Party line on world events. Broadcasters and journalists required prior approval before their works were disseminated. Along with posters, the Nazis produced a number of films and books to spread their beliefs. Leni Riefenstahl was one of the most prominent filmmakers to create German propaganda films.

On 13 March 1933, The Third Reich established a Ministry of Propaganda, appointing Joseph Goebbels as its Minister. Goals were to establish external enemies (countries that allegedly inflicted the Treaty of Versailles on Germany – by territorial claims and ethnocentrism) and internal enemies, such as Jews, Romani, homosexuals, Bolsheviks and topics like degenerate art.

A major political and ideological cornerstone of Nazi policy was the unification of all ethnic Germans living outside of the Reich's borders under one Greater Germany (e.g. Austria and Czechoslovakia). In Mein Kampf, Hitler made a direct remark to those outside of Germany. He stated that pain and misery were being forced upon ethnic Germans outside of Germany, and that they dream of common fatherland. He finished by stating they needed to fight for one's nationality. Throughout Mein Kampf, he pushed Germans worldwide to make the struggle for political power and independence their main focus. Nazi propaganda used the Heim ins Reich policy for this, which began in 1938. In The Myth of the State, Ernst Cassirer wrote that while fascist propaganda mythmaking flagrantly contradicted empirical reality, it provided a simple and direct answer to the anxieties of the secular present.

For months prior to the beginning of World War II in 1939, German newspapers and leaders had carried out a national and international propaganda campaign accusing Polish authorities of organizing or tolerating violent ethnic cleansing of ethnic Germans living in Poland. On 22 August, Adolf Hitler told his generals:

"I will provide a propagandistic casus belli. Its credibility doesn't matter. The victor will not be asked whether he told the truth."

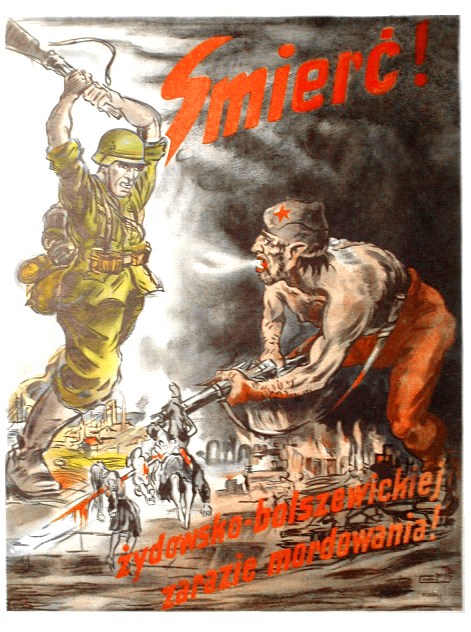
Nazi antisemitic and anti-Soviet propaganda poster in German-occupied Poland. The text reads "Death! to Jewish-Bolshevik pestilence of murdering!"

The main part of this propaganda campaign was the false flag project, Operation Himmler, which was designed to create the appearance of Polish aggression against Germany, which was subsequently used to justify the invasion of Poland.

=== Nuremberg Laws ===
In 1935, racist laws in Nazi Germany were introduced known as the Nuremberg Laws, the laws forbade non-Aryans and political opponents of the Nazis from the civil-service and any sexual relations and marriage between people classified as "Aryan" and "non-Aryan" (Jews, Gypsies, blacks) was prohibited as Rassenschande or "race defilement". The Nuremberg Laws were based on notions of racial purity and sought to preserve the Aryan race, who were at the top of the Nazi racial hierarchy and were said to be the ubermenschen "herrenvolk" (master race), and to teach the German nation to view the Jews as subhumans.

Hitler and Nazi propagandists played on the antisemitism and resentment present in Germany. The Jews were blamed for things such as robbing the German people of their hard work while themselves avoiding physical labour. Der Stürmer, a Nazi propaganda newspaper, told Germans that Jews kidnapped small children before Passover because "Jews need the blood of a Christian child, maybe, to mix in with their Matzah." Posters, films, cartoons, and fliers were seen throughout Germany which attacked the Jewish community. One of the most infamous such films was The Eternal Jew directed by Fritz Hippler.

=== Political opponents ===
Soon after the takeover of power in 1933, Nazi concentration camps were established for political opponents. The first people that were sent to the camps were Communists. They were sent because of their ties with the Soviet Union and because Nazism greatly opposed Communism.

=== France in the 1930s ===
France, a democratic society in the 1930s, but the people were kept in the dark about critical issues of foreign policy. The government tightly controlled all of the media to promulgate propaganda to support the government's foreign policy of appeasement to the aggressions of Italy and especially Nazi Germany. There were 253 daily newspapers, all owned separately. The five major national papers based in Paris were all under the control of special interests, especially right-wing political and business interests that supported appeasement. They were all venal, taking large secret subsidies to promote the policies of various special interests. Many leading journalists were secretly on the government payroll. The regional and local newspapers were heavily dependent on government advertising and published news and editorials to suit Paris. Most of the international news was distributed through the Havas agency, which was largely controlled by the government. Radio was a potentially powerful new medium, but France was quite laggard in consumer ownership of radio sets, and the government impose very strict controls. After 1938, stations were allowed only three brief daily bulletins, of seven minutes each, to cover all the day's news. The Prime Minister's office closely supervised the news items that were to be broadcast. Newsreels were tightly censored; they were told to feature none controversial but glamorous entertainers, film premieres, sporting events, high-fashion, new automobiles, an official ceremonies. Motion pictures likely likewise were censored, and were encouraged to reinforce stereotypes to the effect that the French were always lovers of liberty and justice, contending against cruel and barbarous Germans. The government-subsidized films that glorified military virtues and the French Empire. The goal was to tranquilize public opinion, to give it little or nothing to work with, so as not to interfere with the policies of the national government. When serious crises emerged such as the Munich crisis of 1938, people were puzzled and mystified by what was going on. When war came in 1939, Frenchman had little understanding of the issues, and little correct information. They suspiciously distrusted the government, with the result that French morale in the face of the war with Germany was badly prepared.

== Second World War ==
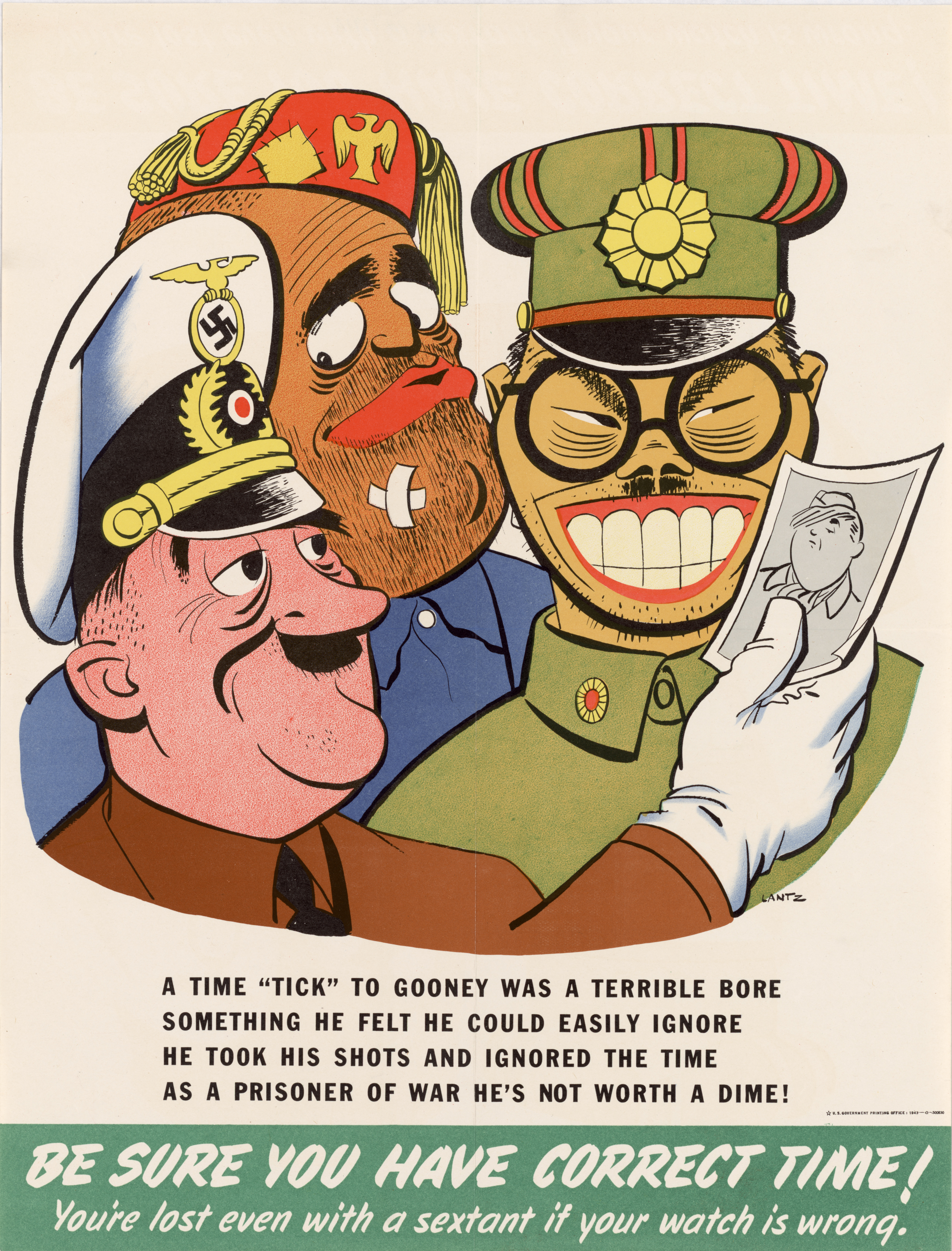
BE SURE YOU HAVE CORRECT TIME! This poster, intended for navigation students, combines instruction with caricatures of Axis leaders. From left-right: Hitler, Mussolini, and Tojo.

Bataan Death March in American propaganda

World War II saw continued use of propaganda as a weapon of war, building on the experience of WW1, both by Hitler's propagandist Joseph Goebbels and the British Political Warfare Executive, as well as the United States Office of War Information (OWI).

Propaganda was an important instrument for Nazi party in acquiring and maintaining power, legitimizing their own authority, demoralizing enemies and spreading Nazi ideology. Before Germany's halt in early 1943, German propaganda actively hid the truth about war crimes and atrocities made in the German-occupied Europe. the Reich Ministry of Public Enlightenment and Propaganda (RMVP) used propaganda to emphasize the humanity that had been shown to the people by the German forces.

Japanese propaganda during World War II presented the war as a defensive against the influence and the hostility of the West. It conveyed the Japanese as victims who would have to fight for their independence and freedom. Japanese propaganda commonly operated to demoralise Allied troops and often employed racial themes to degrade Western culture's oppression of Japan. Common Japanese propaganda depicted Roosevelt and the American people as "sexually depraved" and demons.

Within the US, the British Security Coordination activities worked to counter pro-German sentiment, and isolationist opinion. Because of public distrust following the revelation of false atrocity stories during WW1 and the heavy association of propaganda with the Soviet Union and Nazi Germany, the U.S. government referred to its own propaganda effort as a "strategy of truth", this time using as its main method newsreels and an information format. Enlisting the cooperation of the news media, industry, and Hollywood, the OWI portrayed the war as a contest against democracy and dictatorship, good and evil. While the OWI focused on the home front, the Allies, and neutral countries, the military and the Office of Strategic Services (OSS) engaged in psychological warfare by directing propaganda against the Axis powers.

The British broadcast black propaganda through fake German-language radio stations to Europe. It was disguised to sound like legitimate German radio broadcasts, but it had a negative twist designed to undermine German morale. The Germans undertook a similar program. The Reich Ministry of Public Enlightenment and Propaganda used English language broadcasts – such as Germany Calling – broadcast to the UK. Presenter William Joyce – an American-born fascist who voiced Nazi broadcasts, gained the nickname "Lord Haw-Haw" from the popular press.

In the US, animation became popular, especially for winning over youthful audiences and aiding the U.S. war effort, e.g., Der Fuehrer's Face (1942), which ridicules Hitler and advocates the value of freedom. Some American war films in the early 1940s were designed to create a patriotic mindset and convince viewers that sacrifices needed to be made to defeat the Axis powers. Others were intended to help Americans understand their Allies in general, as in films like Know Your Ally: Britain and Our Greek Allies. Apart from its war films, Hollywood did its part to boost American morale in a film intended to show how stars of stage and screen who remained on the home front were doing their part not just in their labors, but also in their understanding that a variety of peoples worked together against the Axis menace: Stage Door Canteen (1943) features one segment meant to dispel Americans' mistrust of the Soviets, and another to dispel their bigotry against the Chinese.

== Cold War propaganda ==
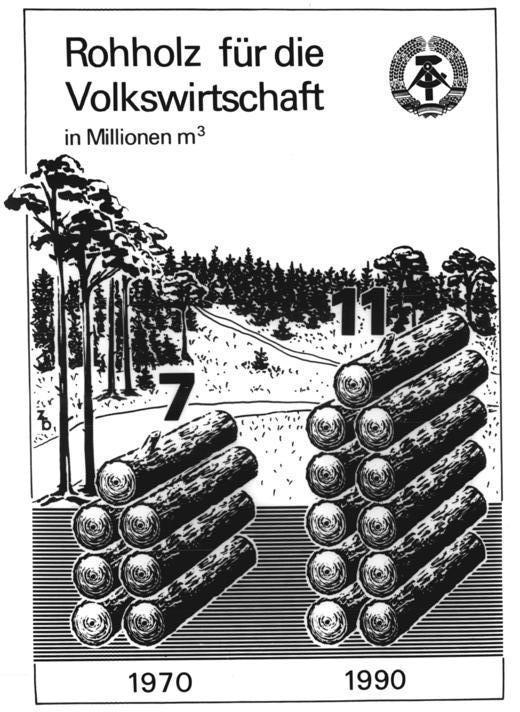
A 1988 East German communist poster showing the increase of timber production from 7 million cubic metres in 1970 to 11 million in 1990

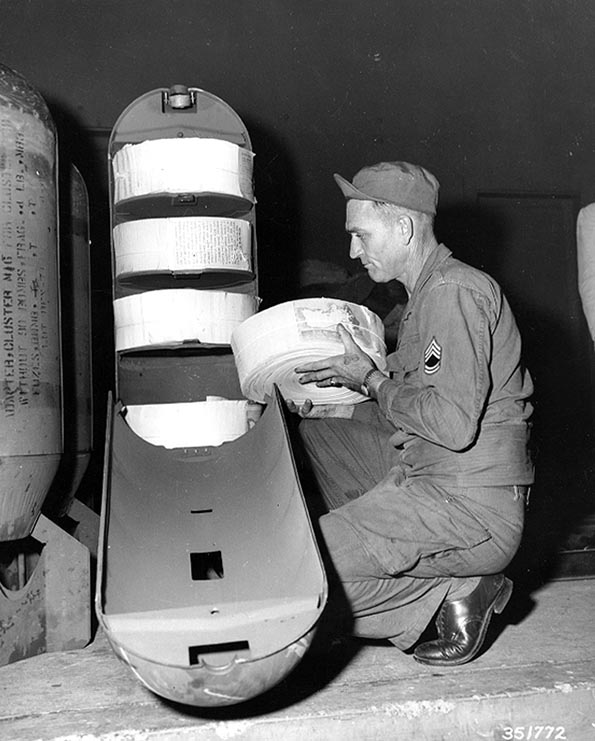
Soldier loads a "leaflet bomb" during the Korean War

During the Cold War, propaganda became highly ideological rather than tactical, and the rivalry among the United States, Soviet Union, and People's Republic of China generated the most pervasive and intense propaganda seen thus far.

All sides used film, television, and radio programming to influence their own citizens, each other, and Third World nations. The United States Information Agency operated the Voice of America as an official government station. Radio Free Europe and Radio Liberty, which were, in part, supported by the Central Intelligence Agency, provided grey propaganda in news and entertainment programs to Eastern Europe and the Soviet Union respectively. The Soviet Union's official government station, Radio Moscow, broadcast white propaganda, while Radio Peace and Freedom broadcast grey propaganda. Both sides also broadcast black propaganda programs in periods of special crises.

In 1948, the United Kingdom's Foreign Office created the IRD (Information Research Department), which took over from wartime and slightly post-war departments such as the Ministry of Information and dispensed propaganda via various media such as the BBC and publishing.

Its main targets were in the Third World. However, it was also set out to "be of use to" British media and opinion formers. As well as supplying material to the BBC World Service, secret lists were compiled of approved journalists and trade unionists to whom material was offered, if not always accepted.

Possibly its most notorious "project" was the joint operation with the CIA to set up Encounter magazine, edited by Stephen Spender from 1953 to 1966. Spender resigned after it emerged that the Congress for Cultural Freedom, which published the magazine, was being covertly funded by the CIA.

The ideological and border dispute between the Soviet Union and People's Republic of China resulted in a number of cross-border operations. One technique developed during this period was the "backwards transmission," in which the radio program was recorded and played backwards over the air. (This was done so that messages meant to be received by the other government could be heard, while the average listener could not understand the content of the program).

When describing life in capitalist countries, in the US in particular, propaganda focused on social issues such as poverty and anti-union action by the government. Workers in capitalist countries were portrayed as "ideologically close". Propaganda claimed rich people from the US derived their income from weapons manufacturing, and claimed that there was substantial racism or neo-fascism in the US.

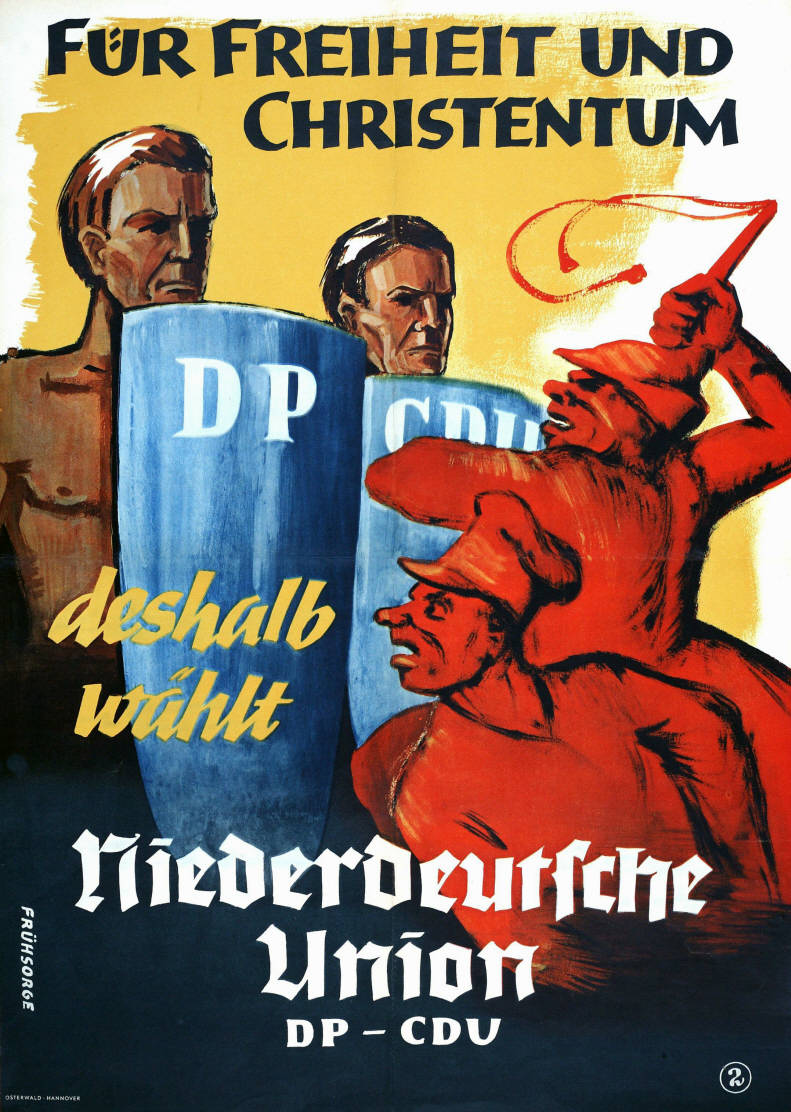
Anti-communist propaganda posters of the Christian Democratic Union of Germany, 1951

When describing life in Communist countries, western propaganda sought to depict an image of a citizenry held captive by governments that brainwash them. The West also created a fear of the East, by depicting an aggressive Soviet Union. In the Americas, Cuba served as a major source and a target of propaganda from both black and white stations operated by the CIA and Cuban exile groups. Radio Habana Cuba, in turn, broadcast original programming, relayed Radio Moscow, and broadcast The Voice of Vietnam as well as alleged confessions from the crew of the USS Pueblo.

George Orwell's novels Animal Farm (1945) Nineteen Eighty-Four (1949) are virtual textbooks on the use of propaganda. Though not set in the Soviet Union, these books are about totalitarian regimes that constantly corrupt language for political purposes. The CIA, secretly commissioned an animated film adaptation of Animal Farm in the 1950s with small changes to the original story to suit its own needs.

During the Cuban Revolution, in 1955 Fidel Castro stressed the importance of propaganda in his struggle both against Fulgencio Batista and the United States, saying, "Propaganda is the heart of our struggle. We must never abandon propaganda."

== Vietnam War ==
=== Pro-South ===
From the beginning of its involvement in Vietnam, the United States government engaged in covert psychological operations. Thomas Anthony Dooley III, a medical intelligence recruit, became the public face of Operation Passage to Freedom, a refugee program secretly designed by CIA officer Edward Lansdale. The refugee surge from North to South appeared spontaneous to the American public, but was partly engineered by Lansdale's hoax threats of dropping nuclear bombs on Hanoi. Although celebrated for independent humanitarian activities, after his death the public learned that Thomas Dooley had been recruited as an intelligence operative by the Central Intelligence Agency, and numerous descriptions of atrocities by the Viet Minh in his book Deliver Us From Evil had been fabricated. Dooley later did similar propaganda work in Laos.

Lansdale went on to run black propaganda operations out of Saigon in collaboration with Prime Minister Ngo Dinh Diem. The CIA's forged Communist pamphlets were so convincing they even fooled some of the Viet Minh, and US journalist Joseph Alsop reported Lansdale's disinformation as fact. The agency also manipulated astrology reports in the North in order to negatively effect the morale of the population. However, the CIA's efforts played a minimal role in people's decisions to move south.

=== Pro-North ===
Propaganda was used extensively by Communist forces in the Vietnam War as means of controlling people's opinions. Radio stations like Radio Hanoi were an integral part of North Vietnamese propaganda operations. Communist Vietnamese politician Mai Chi Tho, commenting on the use of propaganda, stated:

"Ho Chi Minh may have been an evil man; Nixon may have been a great man. The Americans may have had the just cause; we may not have had the just cause. But we won and the Americans were defeated because we convinced the people that Ho Chi Minh is the great man, that Nixon is a murderer and the Americans are the invaders... The key factor is how to control people and their opinions. Only Marxism–Leninism can do that."

=== U.S. home front ===
On the U.S. home front, information was tightly controlled and the government maintained an upbeat official line about the conduct of the War. However, during the Nixon administration, revelations from the Pentagon Papers and about the My Lai Massacre and the war's expansion into Cambodia and Laos, exposed the government's secrecy and manipulation of information. This led to a "credibility gap" when much evidence contradicted the upbeat official line. By 1971, more than 70% of those polled thought the U.S. military involvement in Vietnam had been a mistake.

== Yugoslav Wars ==
During the Yugoslav Wars, propaganda was used as a military strategy by governments of Federal Republic of Yugoslavia.

Propaganda was used to incite fear and hatred, and particularly incite the Serb population against the other ethnicities (Bosniaks, Croats, Albanians and other non-Serbs). Serb media made a great effort in justifying, revising or denying mass war crimes committed by Serb forces during these wars.

According to the ICTY verdicts against Serb political and military leaders, during the Bosnian war, the propaganda was a part of the Strategic Plan by Serb leadership, aimed at linking Serb-populated areas in Bosnia and Herzegovina together, gaining control over these areas and creating a sovereign Serb nation state, from which most non-Serbs would be permanently removed. The Serb leadership was aware that the Strategic Plan could only be implemented by the use of force and fear, thus by the commission of war crimes.

Croats also used propaganda against Serbs throughout and against Bosniaks during the 1992–1994 Croat–Bosniak War, which was part of the larger Bosnian War. During Lašva Valley ethnic cleansing, Croat forces seized the television broadcasting stations (for example at Skradno) and created its own local radio and television to carry propaganda. They also seized the public institutions, raised the Croatian flag over public institution buildings and imposed the Croatian Dinar as the unit of currency. During this time, Busovača's Bosniaks were forced to sign an act of allegiance to the Croat authorities, fell victim to numerous attacks on shops and businesses and, gradually, left the area out of fear that they would be the victims of mass crimes. According to ICTY Trial Chambers, in Blaškić case, Croat authorities created a radio station in Kiseljak to broadcast nationalist propaganda. A similar pattern was applied in Mostar and Gornji Vakuf (where Croats created a radio station called Radio Uskoplje). Local propaganda efforts in parts of Bosnia and Herzegovina controlled by the Croats were supported by Croatian daily newspapers such as Večernji list and Croatian Radiotelevision, especially by controversial reporters Dijana Čuljak and Smiljko Šagolj, who are still blamed by the families of Bosniak victims in Vranica case for inciting massacre of Bosnian POWs in Mostar when broadcasting a report about alleged terrorists arrested by Croats who victimised Croat civilians. The bodies of Bosnian POWs were later found in Goranci mass grave. Croatian Radiotelevision presented Croat attack on Mostar as a Bosnian Muslim attack on Croats in alliance with the Serbs. According to ICTY, in the early hours of May 9, 1993, the Croatian Defence Council (HVO) attacked Mostar using artillery, mortars, heavy weapons and small arms. The HVO controlled all roads leading into Mostar and international organisations were denied access. Radio Mostar announced that all Bosniaks should hang out a white flag from their windows. The HVO attack had been well prepared and planned.

During the ICTY trials against Croat war leaders, many Croatian journalists participated as defence witnesses trying to relativise war crimes committed by Croatian troops against non-Croat civilians (Bosniaks in Bosnia and Herzegovina and Serbs in Croatia). During the trial against general Tihomir Blaškić (later convicted of war crimes), Ivica Mlivončić, Croatian columnist in Slobodna Dalmacija, tried to defend general Blaškić presenting claims in his book Zločin s pečatom about alleged "genocide against Croats" (most of it unproven or false), which were considered by the Trial Chambers as irrelevant for the case. After the conviction, he continued to write in Slobodna Dalmacija against the ICTY presenting it "as the court against Croats", with chauvinistic claims that the ICTY cannot be unbiased because "it is financed by Saudi Arabia (Muslims)".

== Propaganda films ==
At the turn of the 20th century, films emerged as the new cultural agents, depicting events and showing foreign images to mass audiences in European and American cities. Politics and film began to intertwine with the reconstruction of the Boer War for a film audience and recordings of war in the Balkans. The new medium proved very useful for political and military interests when it came to reaching a broad segment of the population and creating consent or encouraging rejection of the real or imagined enemy. They also provided a forceful voice for independent critics of contemporary events.

The earliest known propaganda film was a series of short silent films made during the Spanish–American War in 1898 created by Vitagraph Studios.

At an epic 120 minute running time, the 1912 Romanian Independența României is the first fictional film in the world with a deliberate propagandistic message. Filmed with a budget that would not be reached by a Romanian movie until 1970 (Michael the Brave, supported by the Romanian communist regime also for propagandistic purposes), the movie was meant to shift the perception of the Romanian public towards an acceptance of Romanian involvement into an expected Balkan conflict (the First Balkan War).

Another of the early fictional films to be used for propaganda was The Birth of a Nation (1915).

=== World War I ===
Documentary on the official American film cameramen in World War I

Film was still relatively new to urban audiences with the outbreak of hostilities in 1914. Governments' use of film as propaganda reflected this. The British and Americans' initial struggles in the official use of film led to eventual success in their use of the medium. The Germans were off to a faster start in recognising film's value as a tool of perpetuating pro-German sentiment in the US through The American Correspondent Film Company as well as on the front lines with their mobile cinemas, which showed feature films and newsreels.

Though the Allied governments were slow to use film as a medium for conveying a desired position and set of beliefs, individuals, such as Charlie Chaplin were considerably more successful with The Bond and Zepped.

=== Interwar period ===
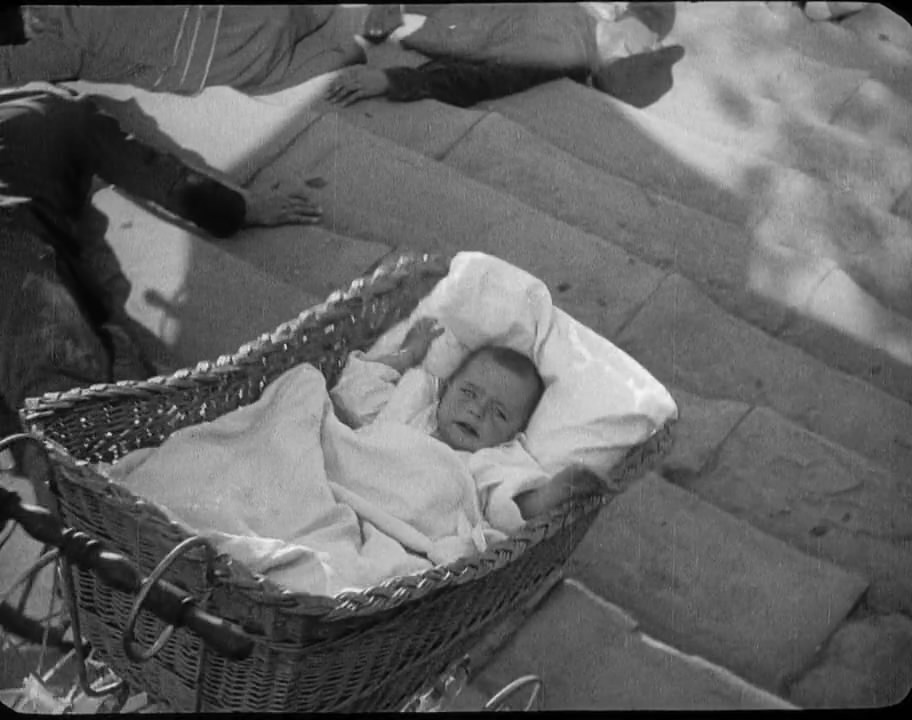
A baby in a carriage falling down the Potemkin Stairs in the iconic scene of The Battleship Potemkin

In the years following the October Revolution of 1917, the Soviet government sponsored the Russian film industry with the purpose of making propaganda films. The development of Russian cinema in the 1920s by such filmmakers as Dziga Vertov and Sergei Eisenstein saw considerable progress in the use of the motion picture as a propaganda tool, yet it also served to develop the art of moviemaking. Eisenstein's films, in particular 1925's The Battleship Potemkin, are seen as masterworks of the cinema, even as they glorify Eisenstein's Communist ideals. In depicting the 1905 Russian Revolution Potemkin sought to create a new history for Russia, one led and triumphed over by the formerly oppressed masses. Eisenstein was heavily influenced by the ideology of the 1917 Bolshevik revolution, which results in it providing better insight into the mindset of the later revolution than that which it depicted. Its dual purpose beyond forging a national Russian identity was to bring its revolutionary Communist message to the West. Its influence was feared in Germany to the extent that the government banned the film when it was released in the late 1920s. Another of Eisenstein's films, 1927's October, depicted the Bolshevik perspective on the October Revolution, culminating in the storming of the Winter Palace which provided Soviet viewers with the victory that the workers and peasants lacked in Battleship Potemkin, ending with Lenin (as played by an unknown worker) declaring that the government is overthrown. Because no documentary material existed of the storming of the palace, Eisenstein's re-creation of the event has become the source material for historians and filmmakers, giving it further legitimacy as the accepted historical record, which illustrates its success as a propaganda film.

Between the Great Wars American films celebrated the bravery of the American soldiers while depicting war as an existential nightmare. Films such as The Big Parade depicted the horrors of trench warfare, the brutal destruction of villages, and the lack of provisions.

Meanwhile, Nazi filmmakers produced highly emotional films about the suffering of the German minority in Czechoslovakia and Poland, which were crucial towards creating popular support for occupying the Sudetenland and attacking Poland. Films like the 1941 Heimkehr (Homecoming) depicted the plight of homesick ethnic Germans in Poland longing to return to the Reich which in turn set the psychological conditions for the real attack and acceptance of the German policy, Lebensraum (living space).

=== World War II ===
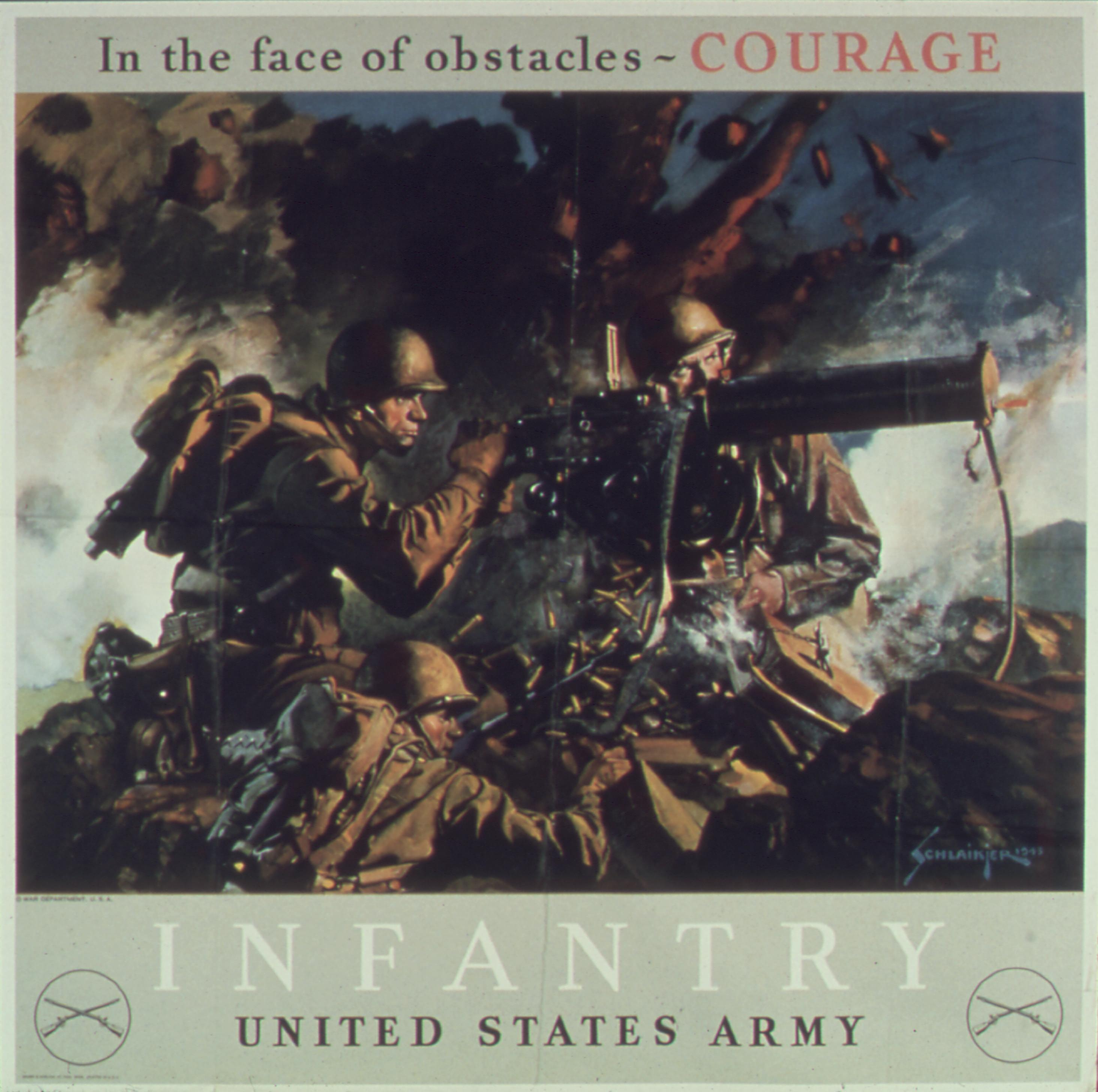
In the face of obstacles – COURAGE. Depicting the United States Army in action.

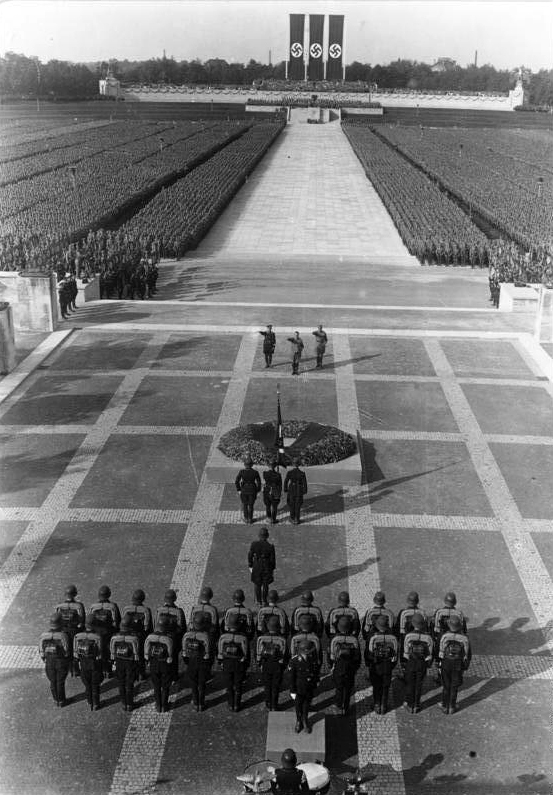
The Totenehrung (honouring of dead) at the 1934 Nuremberg Rally. SS leader Heinrich Himmler, Adolf Hitler and SA leader Viktor Lutze (from L to R) on the stone terrace. From Triumph of the Will by Leni Riefenstahl

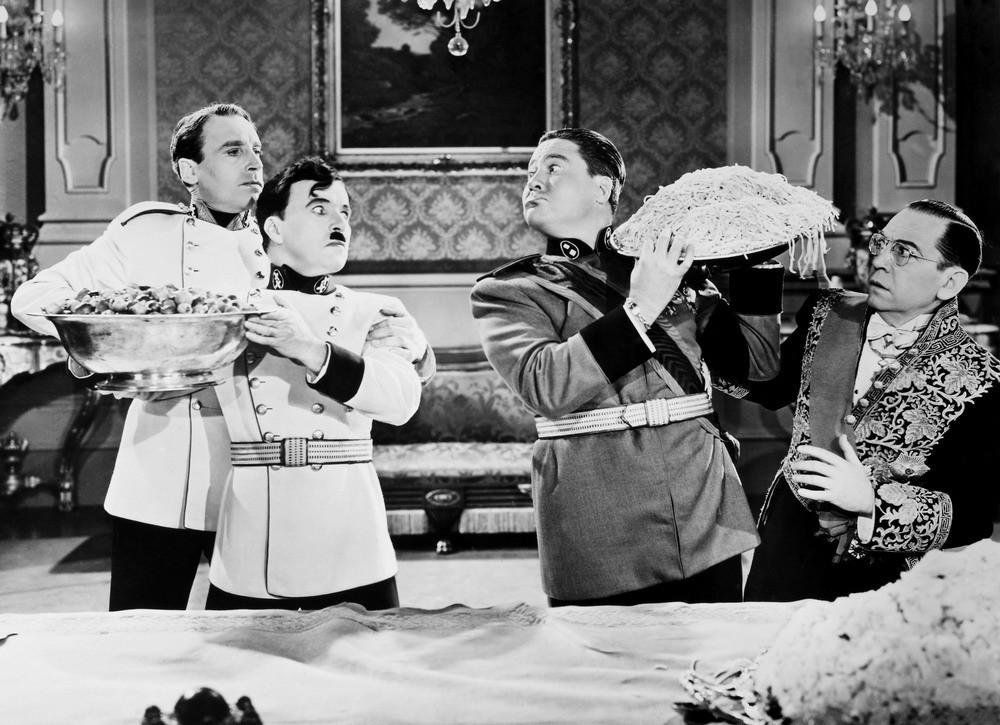
Charlie Chaplin in the film The Great Dictator

Occupied-Dutch newsreel by Polygoon-Profilti featuring people swimming (1941)

The 1930s and 1940s, which saw the rise of totalitarian states and the Second World War, are arguably the "Golden Age of Propaganda". Nazi control of the German film industry is the most extreme example of the use of film in the service of a fascist national program and, in 1933, Hitler created the Reich Ministry for People's Enlightenment and Propaganda and appointed the youthful Joseph Goebbels as its head. Fritz Hippler, producer of one of the most powerful propaganda films of the time, 1940's The Eternal Jew (Der ewige Jude), ran the film department under Goebbels. The Eternal Jew purported to be a documentary depicting the Jewish world, insinuating that the Jewish population consisted of avaricious barbarians putting on a front for civilized European society, remaining indifferent and unaffected by the war. During this time Leni Riefenstahl, a filmmaker working in Nazi Germany, created one of the best-known propaganda films, Triumph of the Will, a film commissioned by Hitler to chronicle the 1934 Nazi Party rally in Nuremberg. Despite its controversial subject, the film is still recognized for its revolutionary approach to using music and cinematography. Another of Riefenstahl's films, 1938's Olympia, was meant to prove that the Reich was a democratic and open society under Nazi rule. It had the perfect venue, the 1936 Berlin Olympics in which to showcase Adolf Hitler's Aryan ideals and prowess. One of the most notable shots is Hitler congratulating the African American Jesse Owens on his four gold medals, whose successes spoiled Hitler's wish to depict those of African descent as racially inferior. The film won a number of prestigious film awards but fell from grace, particularly in the United States when, in November 1938, the world learned of the program against the Jews. Riefenstahl's cinematic masterpiece, though temporarily effective propaganda, was unable to mitigate the growing awareness of the political realities in Nazi Germany.

In the United States during World War II, President Franklin D. Roosevelt recognized that the direct style of propaganda would not win over the American public. He assigned Lowell Mellett to the post of coordinator of government film. Although he had no jurisdiction over Hollywood films, he pressured the industry into contributing to the war effort. On 13 January 1945, Mellett stated in then-confidential testimony that he was assigned to persuade the film industry to "insert morale-building and citizenry arousing themes in its films by all means possible." Luckily, many directors recognized the necessity (and likely the commercial success they would reap) of supporting the battle against fascism as public opinion lay with the war effort. One such filmmaker, Frank Capra, created a seven-part U.S. government-sponsored series of films to support the war effort entitled Why We Fight (1942–5). This series is considered a highlight of the propaganda film genre. Other propaganda movies, such as Thirty Seconds Over Tokyo (1944) and Casablanca (1942), have become so well loved by film viewers that they can stand on their own as dramatic films, apart from their original role as propaganda vehicles. Charlie Chaplin once again joined the U.S. war effort, creating The Great Dictator (1940), in which he played the Hitler-like character of 'Adenoid Hynkel' — this was preceded by some nine months by the short subject starring The Three Stooges, You Nazty Spy!, as Moe Howard was the first American actor (as "Moe Hailstone") to spoof Hitler in film.

Animation became popular, especially for winning over youthful audiences. Walt Disney and Looney Tunes were among those that actively aided the U.S. war effort through their cartoons which provided training and instructions for viewers as well as a political commentary on the times. One of the most popular, Der Fuehrer's Face (1942) was a means of relieving the aggression against Hitler by making him a somewhat comical figure while showcasing the freedom America offered. Disney's Food Will Win the War (1942) attempts to make US citizens feel good by using US agriculture as a means of power. Also popular in the Soviet Union, the government produced such animated shorts as What Hitler Wants, which depicts a devilish Hitler giving Russian factories to capitalists, enslaving and riding once-free Soviet citizens, but shows that the U.S.S.R. will be prepared to fight, paying the Germans back in triplicate, ready to beat the 'fascist pirates.'

Many of the dramatic war films in the early 1940s in the United States were designed to create a patriotic mindset and convince viewers that sacrifices needed to be made to defeat "the enemy." Despite fears that too much propaganda could diminish Hollywood's entertainment appeal, reducing its targeted audience and decreasing profits, military enlistment increased and morale was considered to be higher, in part attributed to America's innovative propaganda. One of the conventions of the genre was to depict a racial and socioeconomic cross-section of the United States, either a platoon on the front lines or soldiers training on a base, which come together to fight for the good of the country. In Italy, at the same time, film directors like Roberto Rossellini produced propaganda films for similar purposes.

Similar to Nazi Germany, the U.S.S.R. prepared its citizens for war by releasing dramas, such as Sergei Eisenstein's iconic Alexander Nevsky. The U.S.S.R also screened films depicting partisan activity and the suffering inflicted by the Nazis, such as Girl No. 217, which showed a Russian girl enslaved by an inhumane German family. Films were shown on propaganda trains while newsreels were screened in subway stations to reach those who were unable to pay to see films in the theater.

=== Cold War ===
Psychological combat was in fashion during the Cold War, and was used heavily by both sides.

When describing life in Communist countries, western propaganda sought to depict an image of a brainwashed citizenry which was then held captive by their government. The CIA's Office of Policy Coordination adapted George Orwell's Animal Farm into an animated movie in 1954 that was released in England. In 1951, the American Federation of Labor disseminated a map, entitled "'Gulag'--Slavery, Inc.," of the Soviet Union showing the locations of 175 forced labor camps administered by the Gulag. It was widely reprinted across the United States and internationally. The U.S. government made various anti-communist "education" documentaries, known as Armed Forces Information Films (AFIF), first shown to the Armed Forces, then released to commercial television or as educational films in schools. They include Communism (1950), Communist Weapon of Allure (1950), Communist Blueprint for Conquest (1956), Red Nightmare (1957), Challenge of Ideas (1961), and Communism (1967). Some were used to portray the American Left as infiltrated by communism, such as Communist Target—Youth (1960), produced by J. Edgar Hoover, which painted the anti-HUAC riots of the 1950s as the work of communism; Anarchy, USA (1966) presents the civil rights movement as a part of a communist plot for world domination.

Red Dawn (1984) was a commercial Hollywood film that depicts an alternate 1980s in which the United States is invaded by the Soviet Union, Cuba, Nicaragua, and other Latin American allies of the U.S.S.R. and a group of small-town high school students engage in guerrilla warfare in their resistance of the occupation, eventually beating the communists.

Pork Chop Hill (1959) was the most notable 1950s American anti-war propaganda piece about the Korean war. Milestone was known for his previous anti-war films, including 1930's All Quiet on the Western Front and Shangganling (The Battle of Sangkumryung Ridge or Triangle Hill; 1956), which was the most influential film on the Chinese in that era. Both Pork Chop Hill and Shangganling depict a single battle in which a small dedicated unit defends a small holdout with very little hope of reprieve. Like all propaganda the importance of the film is not the battle itself but the outstanding characteristics of such individuals who would commit such acts of patriotism for their home and country.

=== Post-9/11 ===
Over 100 years since its creation, film continues to resonate with viewers and helps influence or reinforce a particular viewpoint. Following the 9/11 attacks, many Americans were split on the success of the government's response and the ensuing war in Afghanistan and Iraq. Similar to the Vietnam War, filmmakers expressed their view of the attacks and feelings about the war through films, most notably, Fahrenheit 9/11 (2004). The film sparked debate across the country, presenting mixed assessments on the role of the U.S. government and its response along with the controversy that normally arises when depicting recent, traumatic events. Director Michael Moore omits footage of the planes striking the Twin Towers, cutting directly to the aftermath and destruction. Alan Petersen's Fahrenhype 9/11 was released in response to Fahrenheit 9/11's success in theaters. Petersen called Fahrenheit 9/11 "the Road Runner of manipulation...removing all avenues of thought through over-determination...leaving no room for the viewer's own judgment." It received considerably less press and screentime than Moore's controversial piece.

Ayman al-Zawahiri stated that "We are in a media battle for the hearts and minds of our umma [community] of Muslims." Towards winning the hearts and minds of the MENA region, Al-Qaeda and its affiliates have produced propaganda films and documentaries depicting jihadist attacks, last will and testament videos, training, and interviews, all meant to boost morale among supporters. Al-Qaeda established a Media Committee early in its inception to handle traditional Western and Arab media as well as create an online media presence, which was established through the multi-media company as-Sahab in 2001. The company, which produces documentary-like films and operational videos for Afghanistan is known for its technological sophistication, cinematic effects, and their efforts to reach the west with translations and subtitling. Its operational videos were serialised in Pyre for Americans in Khorasan [Afghanistan]. Other productions in North Africa include Apostate in Hell, a Somali film produced by al-Fajr Media Centre includes interviews with Somali jihadists, training of fighters, preparation for an attack, and actual operations. It along with many other al-Qaeda videos is distributed by Arabic jihadist websites as that community relies on the Internet to a high degree to disseminate information to followers.

=== Food, health, and beyond ===
Elements of propaganda films can also be incorporated into films that have messages that seek to implement positive change within society. However, what one generation may see as positive, later generations may experience as negative.

Food

As mentioned previously, Walt Disney's Food Will Win the War (1942) attempts to make US citizens feel good by using US agriculture as a means of power. In 1943, the United States Department of Agriculture (USDA) introduced its "Basic 7" nutrition guide (a precursor to the food pyramid). In the same year, the United States Office of War Information released Food for Fighters about the importance of nutrition in wartime. Between the 1940s and 1970s the Green Revolution increased agriculture production around the world which led to further increases in farm size and a reduction in the number of farms. Advances in fertilizers, herbicides, insecticides, fungicides, antibiotics, and growth hormones, reduced crop wastage due to weeds, insects, and diseases at the expense of health and safety from agricultural pollution. Good Eating Habits (1951) by Coronet Films is a drama focusing on gluttony and "hidden hunger," where well-nourished people eat poorly and malnourish themselves. Miracles From Agriculture (1960) from the USDA presents then supermarkets as the showplaces of agriculture, discussing methods of improvement in the growing, handling, processing, and shipping of food products and the cooperative assistance offered by agricultural and food-processing research centres; the film also hypothesises that a nation grows according to the productivity of its agriculture.

Since the 1990s to the present, responses to mad-cow disease, genetically modified foods, flu epidemics in pigs and birds, and an increase in foodborne illness outbreaks, agricultural pollution, and Concentrated Animal Feeding Operations (CAFOs) have led people to question where their food comes from and what is actually in it. The use of antibiotics and hormones in cattle and birds, artificial food additives like artificial colours/flavors, artificial sweeteners like high-fructose corn syrup and aspartame, artificial preservatives, etc., prompted "propaganda" films like Super Size Me (2004), King Corn (2007), Food, Inc. (2008), Forks Over Knives (2011), and others to promote food awareness, organic farming and eating local organic food, reducing and eliminating pesticides, herbicides, fungicides, and synthetic fertilisers, and adopting a vegan and/or raw food diet.

Health

Health and medical propaganda films include The Pace That Kills (1935, cocaine), The Terrible Truth (1951, Sid Davis, anti-marijuana/heroine), Case Study series by Lockheed Aircraft Corporation (1969, amphetamines, barbiturates, heroine, LSD), Hoxsey: Quacks Who Cure Cancer (1988) about the Hoxsey Therapy, The Beautiful Truth (2008) about the Gerson method for treating cancer, the anti-vaccine The Greater Good, Burzynski The Movie: Cancer Is Serious Business (2010), and Michael Moore's Sicko (2007) about the health care industry.

Other

Other propaganda film topics include Cannabis and hemp, Are You Popular? (1947, Coronet Films, popularity), The Spirit of '43 (1943, Disney, income taxes) with Donald Duck, Boys Beware (1961, anti-homosexuality), Perversion for Profit (1965, anti-pornography), Days and Nights in Wuhan (2021) about the COVID-19 pandemic in Wuhan, China, The Secret (2006), a self-help film about the metaphysical concept of the law of attraction, Expelled: No Intelligence Allowed (2008) about intelligent design, Silent Contest (2013) a military propaganda film produced by the People's Liberation Army, and Elk*rtuk (2021), about Ferenc Gyurcsány's controversial Őszöd speech, made to defame the liberal politician.

== 21st century ==
=== Forms ===
Modern political development has often accounted for the rise of party promotion by numerous means, with propaganda-related extensions forming; Some often view propaganda as necessary in a "promotive" way for political campaigns during referendums, if not plebiscites, as well as elections, whereas they may position themselves upon certain platforms, manifesto if not for reasons of conveyance before the electorate. Further elaboration on such is elaborated upon in debating, whereby one's performance may be regarded as propaganda should they demonstrate strong character, stances, etc.

==== Fake news ====
Fake news websites have been used to disseminate hoaxes, propaganda, and disinformation — using social media to drive web traffic and amplify their effect.

==== Workplace ====
The ease of data collection emerging from the IT revolution has been suggested to have created a novel form of workplace propaganda. A lack of control on the acquired data's use has led to the widespread implementation of workplace propaganda created much more locally by managers in small and large companies, hospitals, colleges and Universities etc. The author highlights the transition of propagandist coming from large, often national producers to small scale production. The same article also notes a departure from the traditional methodology of propagandists i.e., the use of emotionally provocative imagery to distort facts. Data driven propaganda is suggested to use 'distorted data' to overrule emotion. For example, by providing rationales for ideologically driven pay cuts etc.

=== Nations ===
==== China ====
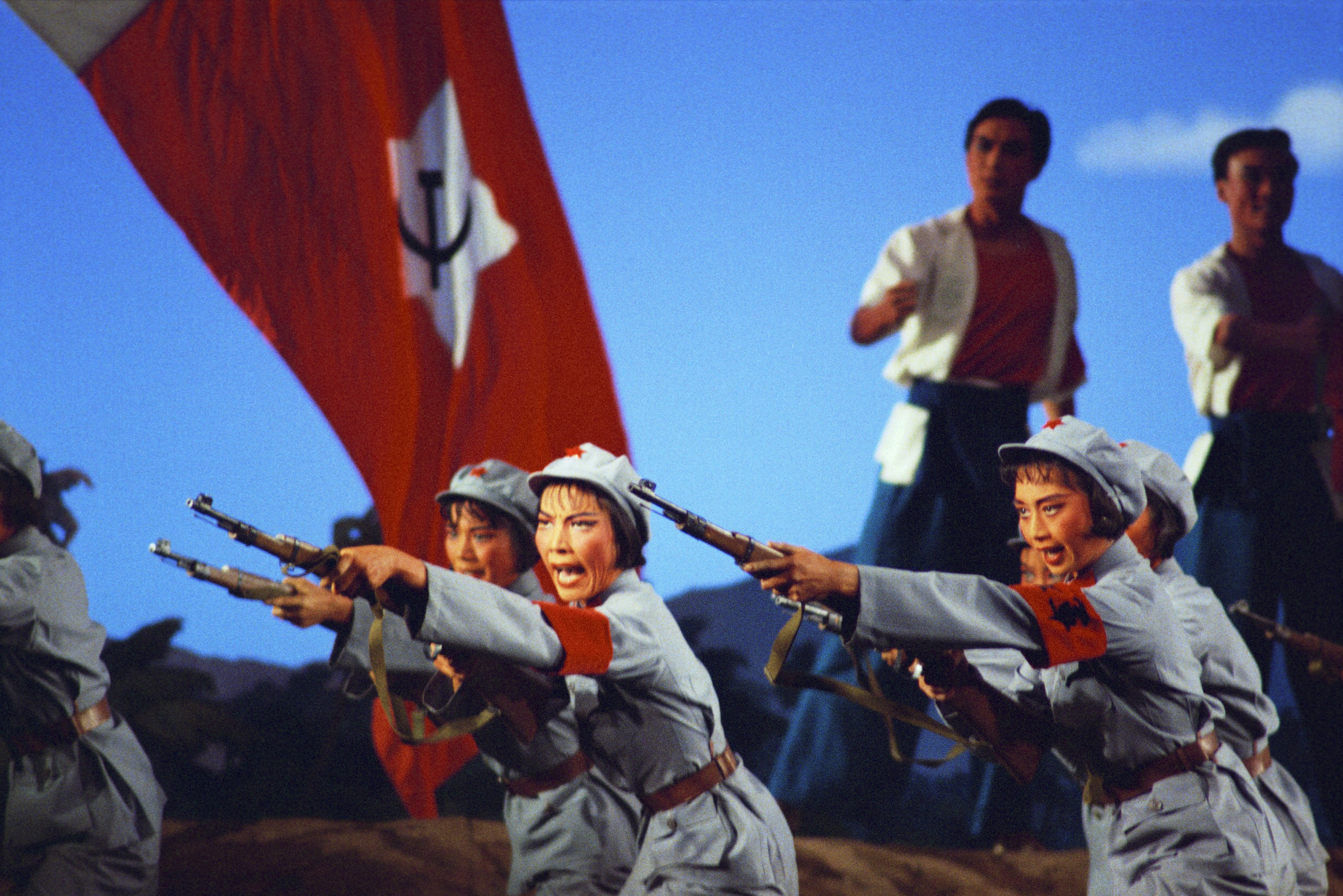
Revolutionary opera with a scene from the Red Detachment of Women

Propaganda is used by the Chinese Communist Party to sway public and international opinion in favour of its policies. Domestically, this includes censorship of proscribed views and an active cultivation of views that favour the government. Propaganda is considered central to the operation of the Chinese government. The term in general use in China, xuanchuan (宣傳 "propaganda; publicity") can have either a neutral connotation in official government contexts or a pejorative connotation in informal contexts. Some xuanchuan collocations usually refer to "propaganda" (e.g., xuānchuánzhàn 宣传战 "propaganda war"), others to "publicity" (xuānchuán méijiè 宣傳媒介 "mass media; means of publicity"), and still others are ambiguous (xuānchuányuán 宣传员 "propagandist; publicist").

Aspects of propaganda can be traced back to the earliest periods of Chinese history, but propaganda has been most effective in the twentieth century owing to mass media and an authoritarian government. China in the era of Mao Zedong is known for its constant use of mass campaigns to legitimise the state and the policies of leaders. It was the first Chinese government to successfully make use of modern mass propaganda techniques, adapting them to the needs of a country which had a largely rural and illiterate population. In poor developing countries, China spreads propaganda through methods such as opening Confucius Institutes, and providing training programs in China for foreign officials and students.

According to Anne-Marie Brady, the Foreign Ministry first set up a system of designated officials to give information in times of crisis in 1983, and greatly expanded the system to lower levels in the mid-1990s. China's spin had been directed only at foreigners, but in the 1990s leaders realised that managing public crises was useful for domestic politics; this included setting up provincial level "News Coordinator Groups," and inviting foreign PR firms to give seminars.

Brady writes that Chinese foreign propaganda officials took cues from the Blair government's spin doctoring during the mad cow disease crisis of 2000–2001, and the Bush government's use of the U.S. media after the terrorist attacks of 11 September 2001. According to her, the Blair model allows for a certain amount of negative coverage to be shown during a crisis, which is believed to help release some of the "social tension" surrounding it. She believes information managers in China used this approach during coal mining disasters of 2005.

According to Brady, trained official spokespeople are now available on call in every central government ministry, as well as in local governments, to deal with emerging crises; these spin doctors are coordinated and trained by the Office of Foreign Propaganda/State Council Information Office.

During the July 2009 Ürümqi riots, Communist Party officials moved swiftly in a public relations campaign. According to Newsweek, Party officials felt that the recent riots risked tarnishing China's global image, and underwent a public relations program involving quickly getting out the government's official version of the events, as well as transporting foreign journalists to riot affected areas. The growth in new technologies, such as email and SMS, forced the CCP's hand into taking up spin.

Instead of attempting a media blackout as with the 2008 Tibetan unrest, the Party has adopted a series of more advanced techniques to influence the information leaving China. The day after violence in Ürümqi, the State Council Information Office set up a Xinjiang Information Office in Ürümqi to assist foreign reporters. It invited foreign media to Xinjiang to tour the riot zones, visit hospitals, and look at the aftermath themselves. Journalists were also given CDs with photos and TV clips. "They try to control the foreign journalists as much as possible by using this more sophisticated PR work rather than ban[ning] them," according to Professor Xiao Qiang, quoted by Newsweek.

Israel

Israel's efforts to communicate directly with citizens of other nations to inform and influence their perceptions, with the aim of garnering support or tolerance for the Israeli government's strategic objectives, have been termed hasbara. Historically, these efforts have evolved from being called "propaganda" by early Zionists, with Theodor Herzl advocating for such activities in 1899, to the more contemporary Hebrew term "hasbara" introduced by Nahum Sokolow, which translates roughly to "explaining". This communicative strategy seeks to justify actions and is considered reactive and event-driven.

==== Mexico ====
Drug cartels have been engaged in propaganda and psychological campaigns to influence their rivals and those within their area of influence. They use banners and narcomantas to threaten their rivals. Some cartels hand out pamphlets and leaflets to conduct public relation campaigns. They have been able to control the information environment by threatening journalists, bloggers and others who speak out against them. They have elaborate recruitment strategies targeting young adults to join their cartel groups. They have successfully branded the word narco, and the word has become part of Mexican culture. There is music, television shows, literature, beverages, food and architecture that all have been branded narco.

==== North Korea ====
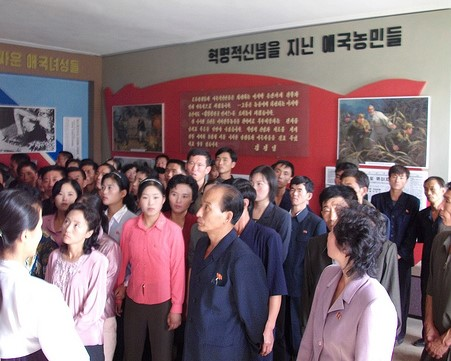
North Koreans touring the Museum of American War Atrocities

Every year, a state-owned publishing house, Gold Star Printing Press, releases several cartoons (called geurim-chaek in North Korea), many of which are smuggled across the Chinese border and, sometimes, end up in university libraries in the United States. The books are designed to instill the Juche philosophy of Kim Il Sung (the "father" of North Korea)—radical self-reliance of the state. The plots mostly feature scheming capitalists from the United States and Japan who create dilemmas for naïve North Korean characters.

DPRK textbooks claim that US missionaries came to the Korean Peninsula and committed barbarous acts against Korean children, including injecting dangerous liquids into the children and writing the word "THIEF" on the forehead of any child who stole an apple for missionary-owned orchards in Korea.

==== United States ====
The National Youth Anti-Drug Media Campaign, originally established by the National Narcotics Leadership Act of 1988, but now conducted by the Office of National Drug Control Policy under the Drug-Free Media Campaign Act of 1998, is a domestic propaganda campaign designed to "influence the attitudes of the public and the news media with respect to drug abuse" and for "reducing and preventing drug abuse among young people in the United States". The Media Campaign cooperates with the Partnership for a Drug-Free America and other government and non-government organizations.

Anti-smoking campaigns that aired in the United States between 1999 and 2000 were state-sponsored to decrease the amounts of youth smoking. The 'Truth' anti-smoking campaign was created to target 12-17 year old to decrease youth smoking in the United States. February 2004 the 'Truth' anti-smoking campaign started to show up on televised commercials to expose youth of the dangers of tobacco and smoking. The televised campaign used provocative tactics to decrease the amount of youth using tobacco and to change attitudes towards the tobacco industry.

In early 2002, the U.S. Department of Defense launched an information operation, colloquially referred to as the Pentagon military analyst program. The goal of the operation is "to spread the administrations's talking points on Iraq by briefing ... retired commanders for network and cable television appearances," where they have been presented as independent analysts. On 22 May 2008, after this program was revealed in The New York Times, the House passed an amendment that would make permanent a domestic propaganda ban that until now has been enacted annually in the military authorization bill.

The Shared values initiative was a public relations campaign that was intended to sell a "new" America to Muslims around the world by showing that American Muslims were living happily and freely, without persecution, in post-9/11 America. Funded by the United States Department of State, the campaign created a public relations front group known as Council of American Muslims for Understanding (CAMU). The campaign was divided in phases; the first of which consisted of five mini-documentaries for television, radio, and print with shared values messages for key Muslim countries.

Social Media

In 2011, The Guardian reported that the United States Central Command (Centcom) was working with a California corporation to develop software that would allow the US government to "secretly manipulate social media sites by using fake online personas to influence internet conversations and spread pro-American propaganda." A Centcom spokesman stated that the "interventions" were not targeting any US-based web sites, in English or any other language, and also said that the propaganda campaigns were not targeting Facebook or Twitter.

In October 2018, The Daily Telegraph reported that Facebook "banned hundreds of pages and accounts which it says were fraudulently flooding its site with partisan political content – although they came from the US instead of being associated with Russia."

In 2022, the Stanford Internet Observatory and Graphika studied banned accounts on Twitter, Facebook, Instagram, and five other social media platforms that used deceptive tactics to promote pro-Western narratives in the Middle East and Central Asia. Vice News noted that "U.S. leaning social media influence campaigns are, ultimately, very similar to those run by adversarial countries.", while EuroNews quoted Stanford researcher Shelby Grossman as saying "I was shocked that the tactics we saw being used were identical to the tactics used by authoritarian regimes".

The Intercept reported in December 2022 that the United States military ran a "network of social media accounts and online personas", and that Twitter whitelisted a batch of accounts upon the request of the United States government. Whitelisting the propaganda accounts gave them the same privileges of a user with a blue check to increase the reach of their operations.

==== Russia ====
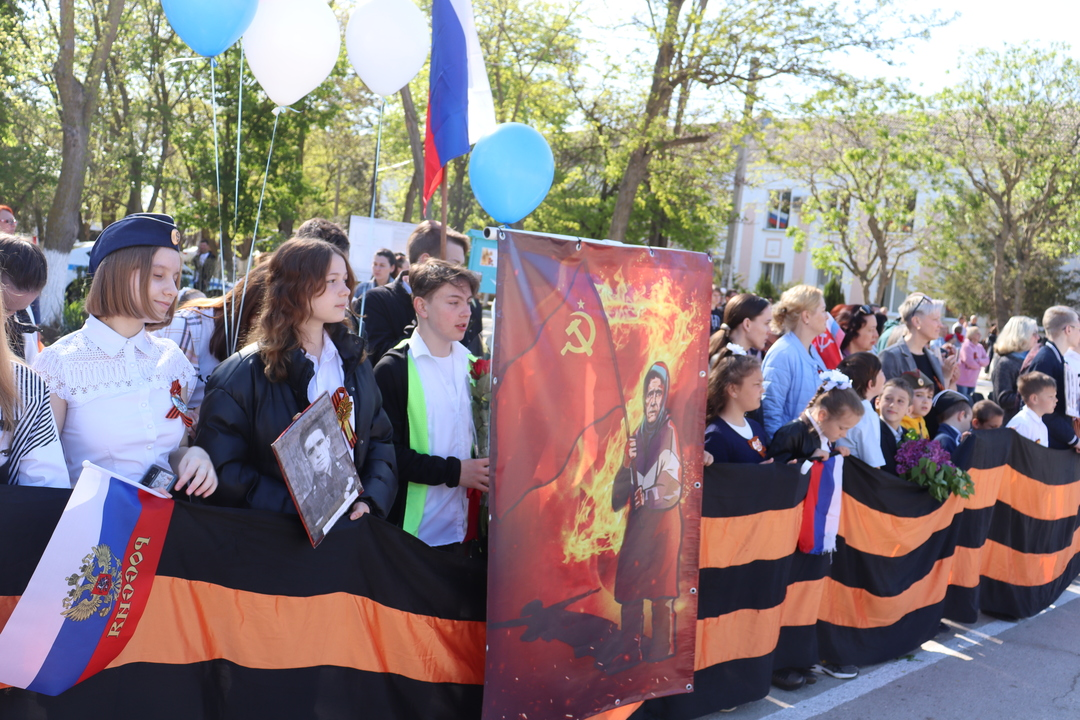
Propaganda poster of grandmother with red flag, Saky, Crimea, 9 May 2022

Vladimir Putin's Russia has been reviving the Soviet-style Propaganda traditions. He stated in April 2005 on national television that the destruction of the USSR was "the greatest geopolitical catastrophe of the twentieth century." In 2005 he established "Russia Today", now called RT, with English, Spanish and Arabic cable news channels financed by the government and designed to function as a "soft power" tool that will improve Russia's image abroad and counter the anti-Russian bias it sees in the Western media. RT's rouble budget in 2013–14 was equivalent to $300 million US dollars, compared to the $367 million budget of the BBC-World Service Group. RT has an American channel based in Washington, and in 2014 opened a British channel based in London. However, the sharp decline in the rouble forced it to postpone channels in German and French. Meanwhile, China and Iran have followed the RT model in launching their own English language channels.

Journalism expert Julia Ioffe argues, RT became an:

extension of former President Vladimir Putin's confrontational foreign policy....It featured fringe-dwelling "experts," like the Russian historian who predicted the imminent dissolution of the United States; broadcast bombastic speeches by Venezuelan President Hugo Chávez; aired ads conflating Barack Obama with Mahmoud Ahmadinejad; and ran out-of-nowhere reports on the homeless in America.

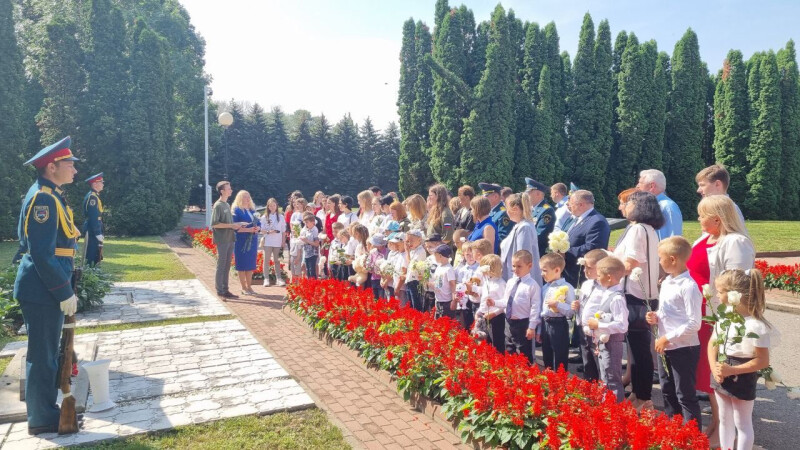
Russian children at a memorial to children allegedly killed by Ukrainian forces in Donbas, a state-sponsored event in Kursk in July 2023

Critics identify a cult of personality around Putin, known as Putinism. Cassiday and Johnson Argue that since taking power in 1999, "Putin has inspired expressions of adulation the likes of which Russia has not seen since the days of Stalin. Tributes to his achievements and personal attributes have flooded every possible media." Ross says the cult emerged quickly by 2002 and emphasizes Putin's "iron will, health, youth and decisiveness, tempered by popular support." Ross concludes, "The development of a Putin mini cult of personality was based on a formidable personality at its heart."

Putin's government shut down almost all independent television media, while allowing a few small critical newspapers and websites to exist. school textbooks were revised to teach students the exceptionality of Russian historical development and how Putin fits into the grand Russian traditions.

== Contemporary wars ==
=== Afghan War ===
In the 2001 invasion of Afghanistan, psychological operations tactics were employed to demoralise the Taliban and to win the sympathies of the Afghan population. At least six EC-130E Commando Solo aircraft were used to jam local radio transmissions and transmit replacement propaganda messages. Leaflets were also dropped throughout Afghanistan, offering rewards for Osama bin Laden and other individuals, portraying Americans as friends of Afghanistan and emphasising various negative aspects of the Taliban. Another shows a picture of Mohammed Omar in a set of crosshairs with the words: "We are watching."

=== Iraq War ===
Both the United States and Iraq employed propaganda during the Iraq War. The United States established campaigns towards the American people on the justifications of the war while using similar tactics to bring down Saddam Hussein's government in Iraq.

==== Iraqi propaganda ====
The Iraqi insurgency's plan was to gain as much support as possible by using violence as their propaganda tool. Inspired by the Vietcong's tactics, insurgents were using rapid movement to keep the coalition off-balance. By using low-technology strategies to convey their messages, they were able to gain support. Graffiti slogans were used on walls and houses praising the virtues of many group leaders while condemning the Iraqi government. Others used flyers, leaflets, articles and self-published newspapers and magazines to get the point across.

Insurgents also produced CDs and DVDs and distributed them in communities that the Iraq and the US Government were trying to influence. The insurgents designed advertisements that cost a fraction of what the US was spending on their ads aimed at the same people in Iraq with much more success. In addition, a domestic Arabic language television station was established with the aim of informing the Iraqi public of alleged coalition propaganda efforts in the country.

==== US propaganda in Iraq ====
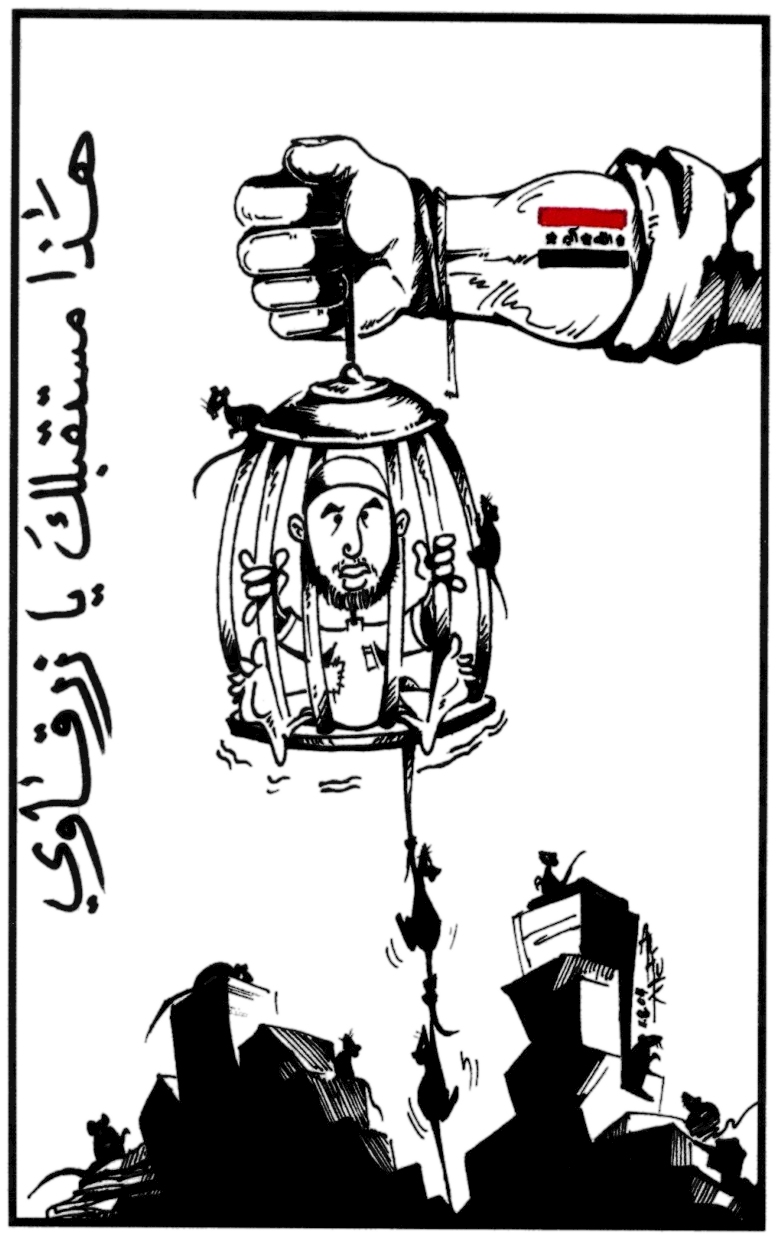
US PSYOP pamphlet disseminated in Iraq. The pamphlet says: "This is your future, Al-Zarqawi", and shows Al-Qaeda fighter Al-Zarqawi caught in a rat trap.

To achieve their aim of a moderate, pro-western Iraq, US authorities were careful to avoid conflicts with Islamic culture that would produce passionate reactions from Iraqis, but differentiating between "good" and "bad" Islam has proved challenging for the US.

The US implemented black propaganda by creating false radio personalities that would disseminate pro-American information, but supposedly run by the supporters of Saddam Hussein. One radio station used was Radio Tikrit. Another example of use of black propaganda is that the United States paid Iraqis to publish articles written by US troops in their newspapers under the idea that they are unbiased and real accounts; this was brought forth by The New York Times in 2005. The article stated that it was the Lincoln Group who had been hired by the US government to create the propaganda. However, their names were later cleared from any wrongdoing.

The US was more successful with the Voice of America campaign, which is an old Cold War tactic that exploited people's desire for information. While the information they gave out to the Iraqis was truthful, they were in a high degree of competition with the opposing forces after the censorship of the Iraqi media was lifted with the removal of Saddam from power.

In November 2005, the Chicago Tribune and the Los Angeles Times alleged that the United States military had manipulated news reported in Iraqi media in an effort to cast a favourable light on its actions while demoralising the insurgency. Lt. Col. Barry Johnson, a military spokesman in Iraq, said the program is "an important part of countering misinformation in the news by insurgents", while a spokesman for former Defense Secretary Donald H. Rumsfeld said the allegations of manipulation were troubling if true. The Department of Defense confirmed the existence of the program.

==== Propaganda aimed at US citizens ====
The extent to which the US government used propaganda aimed at its own people is a matter of discussion. The book Selling Intervention & War, by Jon Western, argued that president Bush was "selling the war" to the public. In a 2005 talk to students Bush said: "See, in my line of work, you got to keep repeating things over and over, and over again, for the truth to sink in, to kind of catapult the propaganda."

While the United States' official stance was to remove Saddam Hussein's power in Iraq with allegations that his government held weapons of mass destruction or was related to Osama bin Laden, over time the Iraq war as a whole has been seen in a negative light. Video and picture coverage in the news has shown shocking and disturbing images of torture and other evils being done under the Iraqi Government.

Russian nationals used different propaganda tools to interfere with the United States 2016 election between Donald Trump and Hillary Clinton. Russia created political propaganda for the United States 2016 election to confuse voters from interpreting which news information was false or misleading. Different tactics used to interfere with the United States 2016 included fake social media accounts on Twitter, Facebook, and other sites, false political rallies, and online political advertisements. Russian nationals used new online propaganda which "is not to convince or persuade", but rather to cause distraction and paranoia. The Select Committee On Intelligence in the United States Senate found that technology aided to providing more convincing and realistic propaganda.

== See also ==
- American propaganda during World War II
- British propaganda during WWII
- Canadian propaganda during World War II
- Color book
- Kangura
- Japanese propaganda during World War II
  - An Investigation of Global Policy with the Yamato Race as Nucleus
  - Hakkō ichiu
  - Shinmin no Michi
  - Statism in Shōwa Japan
- Propaganda in North Korea
- Propaganda in the People's Republic of China
- Propaganda in the Republic of China
- Propaganda in the War in Somalia
- Radio Télévision Libre des Mille Collines
- Soviet propaganda during World War II
