= Canadian propaganda during World War II =

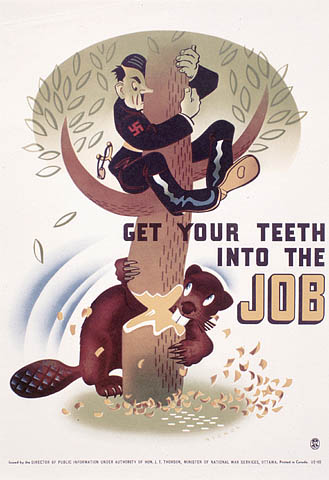
Propaganda poster by Robert Nichol, published by the National War Services

During World War II, Canada used propaganda to increase support for the war and commitment to an Allied victory. It was marked by the extensive use of radio and films, which had become popular since the First World War.

The Bureau of Public Information oversaw the production of posters. Approximately 700 different posters were produced in the course of the war.

The Canadian Broadcasting Corporation, responsible for radio broadcasting, was founded in 1936. In early war, public affairs programming was curtailed by the government and CBC manager Gladstone Murray. This was relaxed after 1942, when Murray was replaced. Programs such as the National War Finance Program, produced by the National War Finance Committee to promote Victory Bonds, and the National School Broadcasts, broadcasts to students that contained news bulletins on the war effort, were broadcast on CBC. Another series, Nazi Eyes on Canada, imagined life under a hypothetical Nazi-occupied Canada.

The National Film Board was founded in 1939, and went on to produce over 500 films during the war. Beginning in 1940, the NFB produced a series of short propaganda films known as Canada Carries On, which would be shown before feature film screenings in cinemas. Another series, The World in Action, was produced following the former's success. Churchill's Island, produced in 1941, was also notable for receiving the first Oscar for Best Documentary Short Subject, awarded at the 14th Academy Awards ceremony in 1942.
