= Days and Nights in Wuhan =

- 武汉日夜
- Directed by: Cao Jinling (曹金玲)
- Written by: Cao Jinling (曹金玲)
- Edited by: Bo Li (李博)
- Music by: Shilei Chang (常石磊)
- Production companies: Chinese Communist Party, Hubei Propaganda Department
- Release date: January 22, 2021
- Running time: 95 minutes
- Country: China
- Language: Mandarin

Days and Nights in Wuhan (Chinese: 武汉日夜) is a 2021 state-backed documentary film detailing the COVID-19 pandemic in Wuhan, Hubei, China. The film was directed by Cao Jinling, and co-produced by the Chinese Communist Party and the Hubei Propaganda Department. Days and Nights in Wuhan was released in China on January 22, 2021. It is unknown if there are plans to release the film outside of China.

Days and Nights in Wuhan features a song titled "You Are So Kind" by Chinese actor and singer Zhou Xun.
