= Ivica Mlivončić =

Croatian journalist

Ivica Mlivončić (1931 – 1 April 2013) was a Croatian author and columnist in Slobodna Dalmacija from Split. Born in Vareš, he graduated at the Faculty of Theology in Ljubljana, then at the Faculty of Political Sciences in Belgrade and the Faculty of Philosophy in Zadar. Mlivončić published several books dealing with religion, the Croatian War of Independence and the Croat–Bosniak War, most notably "The Crime with the Seal" in 1998 about war crimes against Croats, which was included in the Court records of the International Criminal Tribunal for the former Yugoslavia (ICTY). He was a defense witness at the ICTY in the case against Tihomir Blaškić in 1998. He died on 1 April 2013.

== Publications ==
- Crkva u Latinskoj Americi, 1988.
- Pape i Hrvati, 1993.
- Kraljeva Sutjeska i Vareš : povijesne crtice (urednik izdanja), 1996.
- Zločin s pečatom : genocid i ratni zločini muslimansko-bošnjačkih snaga nad Hrvatima BiH 1992. - 1994. , 1998. (2. proš. izd. 2001., 3. izd. 2004.)
- Al Qaida se kalila u Bosni i Hercegovini: mjesto i uloga mudžahida u Republici Hrvatskoj i Bosni i Hercegovini od 1991. do 2005. godine, 2007.
- Muslimanski logori za Hrvate: u vrijeme rata u Bosni i Hercegovini 1991.-1995. godine, 2008.
- Vareš od početaka do rata i poraća 1991-2000 , 2011.
