= Napoleonic propaganda =

Propaganda during the rule of the French Emperor Napoleon

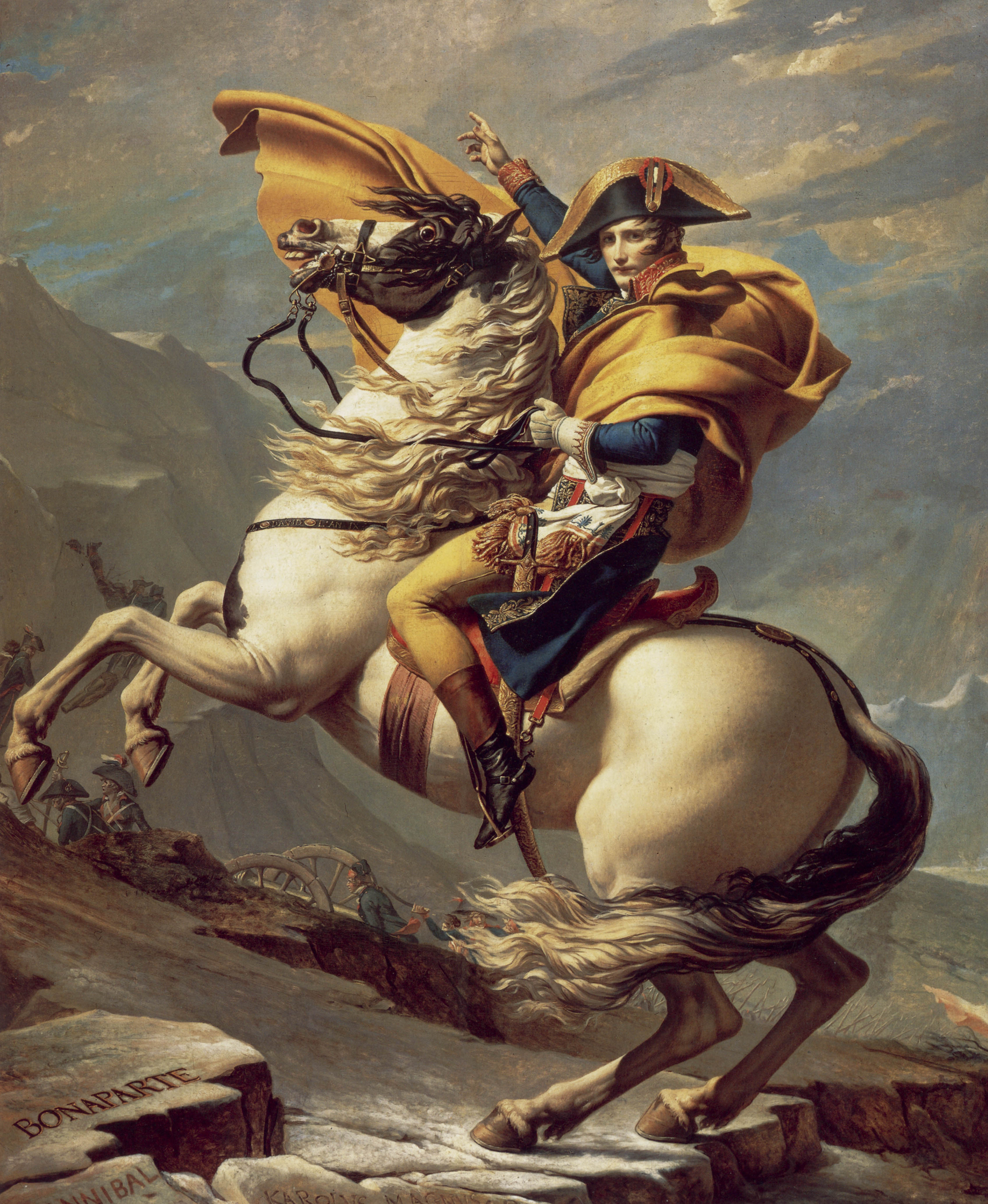
Napoleon Crossing the Alps, romantic version by Jacques-Louis David from 1801

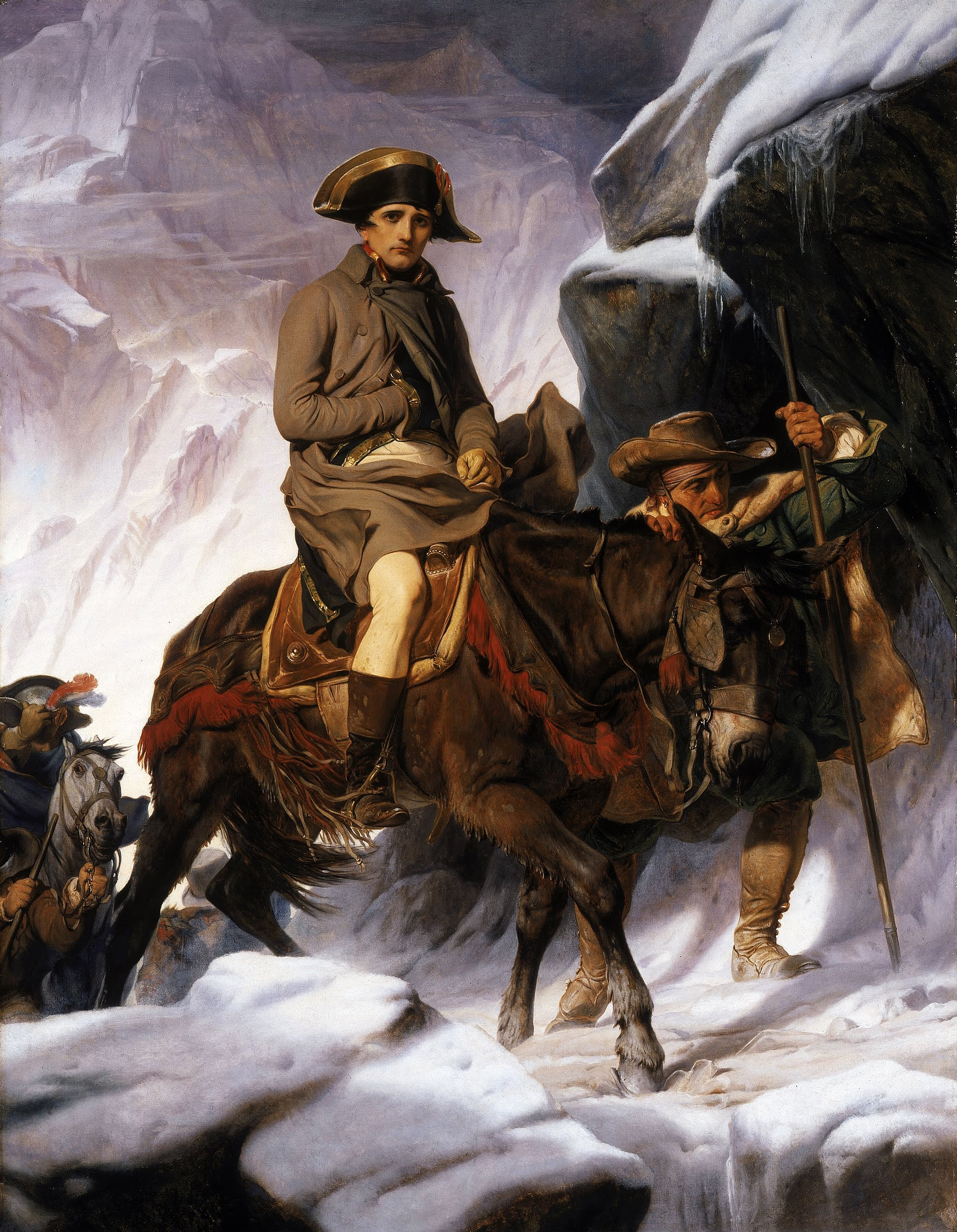
Bonaparte Crossing the Alps, realist version by Paul Delaroche from 1848

During his rise to power and throughout his reign, Napoleon not only benefitted from circumstance but also cultivated his own image through the use of propaganda. Napoleon excelled at garnering public support and capitalising on his victories to convey a persona associated with success and heroism. He utilised propaganda in a wide range of media including theatre, art, newspapers, and bulletins to "promote the precise image he desired." Napoleon’s bulletins from the battlefield were published in newspapers and were well read throughout the country. He used these publications to exaggerate his victories and spread his glorified interpretation of these successes throughout France. Napoleon also controlled his visual representation through commissioned artworks. He worked with artists such as Jacques-Louis David, whose painting Napoleon Crossing the Alps depicted him as a heroic and almost divine leader on a white horse, symbolizing power, courage, and destiny. This image became one of the most recognizable examples of Napoleonic propaganda.

== Medallions ==
In addition to more standard methods of propaganda, such as the press, Napoleon capitalised on the popularity of medallions for his own purposes. Specifically, Napoleon used medallions as tools to promote his desired image both before and after he became Emperor. The design of these medallions often borrowed from classical antiquity, featuring Roman gods, warriors, and heroic symbols. This Neoclassical imagery connected Napoleon’s rule to the grandeur of ancient Rome, reinforcing his authority and portraying his empire as a continuation of a glorious past. In the end, he commissioned more medals than Louis XV and Louis XVI combined. Of particular importance was Napoleon’s first set of medallions, the "Five Battles" Series, produced to commemorate his victories during the first Italian campaign.

=== Five Battles Series ===
The Millesimo-Dego medallion features Hercules holding a club and the Hydra of Lerna’s head. In the other hand Hercules is holding a torch of blazing fire, ready to slaughter this beast. Around the borders of the medals reads "Bataille De Millesimo Combat de Dego." The Hercules figure on these coins represents victory but was also a symbol chosen by the French Republic to represent the nation, thereby connecting Napoleon to both triumph and France.

The Po-Adda-Mincio medal depicts Napoleon leading his soldiers across the Adda on the bridge at Lodi. This medallion glorifies the battle in which most of Lombardy, an Italian province, was captured by the French Army. Subsequently, Napoleon was named General-in-Chief at Milan, the Lombard capital. The coin celebrates not only Napoleon’s victory but his ascension to greater power.

The Battle of Castiglione and the combat at Peschiera medallion pays tribute to Napoleon’s victories in Italy. Napoleon faced an Austrian army in both locations and defeated them, strengthening the French Army’s position in the region. The coin displays three naked warriors, two locked in combat while the third lies slain on the ground. Of the two living figures, one, representing Napoleon’s army, stands ready to strike the final blow to the vanquished Austrians. In some versions Napoleon’s name is inscribed on the coin connecting Bonaparte to the victory and promoting his own personal image.

The Capitulation of Mantua coin commemorates the capture of the Northern Italian city by Napoleon. The medal depicts a woman handing the keys of the city to a Roman warrior. On the reverse, "A L’Arméé D’Italie Victorieuse" is inscribed in addition to Napoleon’s name on some editions of the coin. Symbols from antiquity were used throughout the revolutionary period to tie the new French Republic to the glory of Ancient Rome. By using Roman soldiers on the medallions, Napoleon not only connected himself to the grandeur of ancient times, but also promoted his image as a victorious leader of Revolutionary France.

The Tagliamento-Trieste medallion immortalises Napoleon’s 1797 crossing of the Tagliomento River and the capture of Trieste. The medal shows a god-like figure reclining near a river while a charging army rushes a fleeing group of men. The attacking army is headed by a man on horseback, presumably Napoleon. Like the other medallions, one version has Napoleon’s name inscribed on the side. The medallion bolsters Napoleon’s image by directly connecting him to yet another victory.

== Works cited ==
- Censer, Jack R. and Lynn Hunt (2001). Liberty, Equality, Fraternity: Exploring the French Revolution. University Park: Pennsylvania State University Press. ISBN 0-271-02087-3.
- Hanley, Wayne (2005). The Genesis of Napoleonic Propaganda 1796-1799. New York: Columbia University Press. ISBN 0-231-12456-2.
- Hunt, Lynn (1984). Politics, Culture, and Class in the French Revolution. Berkeley and Los Angeles: University of California Press. ISBN 0-520-05204-8.

== Legacy ==
Napoleon’s mastery of propaganda influenced later political leaders and modern mass communication. His strategic use of art, ceremony, and the press to shape public perception anticipated many techniques used in twentieth-century political propaganda. Scholars often regard Napoleon as one of the first modern figures to understand and control his public image on a national scale.
