= Emmet Lavery =

American writer (1902–1986)

Emmet Godfrey Lavery (November 8, 1902 – January 1, 1986) was an American playwright and screenwriter.

Born in Poughkeepsie, Lavery trained as a lawyer, before devoting his career to the theatre and to film. He wrote the English libretto for Ernst Krenek's 1940 chamber opera Tarquin. 1943 saw him writing for three films:

- He was one of the team of 22 writers collaborating on the 1943 film Forever and a Day.
- He adapted Gregor Ziemer's 1943 book Education For Death for Edward Dmytryk's 1943 film Hitler's Children.
- He wrote the 1943 American war film Behind the Rising Sun, based on the 1941 book by James R. Young.

Lavery was president of the Screenwriters Guild of Los Angeles from 1945 to 1947. He served as vice president of the Academy of Motion Picture Arts and Sciences in 1946. In 1946, Lavery was one of six Hollywood figures listed by William Wilkerson in a The Hollywood Reporter editorial under the headline "Hywd's Red Commissars!" Drawing on the biography Mr. Justice Holmes by Francis Biddle, he wrote the play The Magnificent Yankee, which opened in 1946, and he adapted it for the 1950 film version.

In 1949, Lavery wrote his play The Song at the Scaffold, adapted from the novella The Song at the Scaffold by Gertrud von Le Fort. In April–May 1949, Lavery had secured a contract from von Le Fort that granted him all rights to theatrical adaptations of her story, and formally had declared his own play to be 'the only authorized dramatic version of the novel'. In 1952, Lavery learned of stage productions of Dialogues des Carmélites by Georges Benanos, which Bernanos had written as a film screenplay and completed in 1948, just before his death. In January 1949, von Le Fort had granted the Bernanos heirs permission to publish the screenplay, and had gifted her portion of the royalties due to her, as creator of the original story, over to Bernanos' widow and children.

Lavery contacted the literary agent for the Bernanos heirs, Albert Béguin, to inform the latter of the status of theatrical adaptation rights to the von Le Fort novel. Their subsequent two-year literary rights dispute reached arbitration by a jury from La Societé des Auteurs in Paris. On 20 July 1954, this jury ruled unanimously for Lavery, and ordered the Bernanos heirs to pay Lavery 100,000 FF for past contract infringements. In addition, the ruling required the Bernanos heirs to pay Lavery, with respect to all future productions of Dialogues des Carmélites, 15% of the royalties from English-language productions, and 10% from productions in all other languages. This allowed Lavery to earn royalties from both his own play and the Bernanos adaptation, with no contribution of his own to the latter, because of von Le Fort's waiver of her share of royalties and retroactive application of copyright.

Separately, Francis Poulenc had begun to compose an opera based on Bernanos' work. He curtailed work on his opera in March 1954, in light of his understanding of the Béguin-Lavery dispute. Following the July 1954 decision, separate negotiations occurred between Béguin and Lavery, via Lavery's agent Marie Schebeko, on rights and royalties to allow Poulenc to write his opera. Lavery claimed to have met Poulenc in October 1954 and to have come to a cordial agreement on terms and royalties. However, the final formal agreement was not dated until 30 March 1955, and acknowledged Bernanos, Lavery, von Le Fort, Bruckberger, and Agostini. The terms stipulated that the Poulenc opera was adapted from Bernanos 'with the authorization of Monsieur Emmet Lavery', with Lavery listed in the credits after Bernanos and before von Le Fort, with no contributions of his own at all to Poulenc's libretto.

In 1950, Lavery wrote Guilty of Treason; in 1953, Bright Road ; in 1955 The Court-Martial of Billy Mitchell, which was nominated for "Best Story and Screenplay" at the 28th Academy Awards. He wrote Williamsburg: the Story of a Patriot, a 1957 orientation film for Colonial Williamsburg.

Lavery and his wife Genevieve Lavery had two children. Their son Emmet G. Lavery, Jr. (1927–2014) was himself a lawyer and a producer in Hollywood. Their second child was a daughter, Elizabeth Taylor. His wife and children survived Lavery.
