= World War II and American animation =

World War II changed the possibilities for animation. Prior to the war, animation was mostly seen as a form of family entertainment. The attack on Pearl Harbor was a turning point in its utility. On December 8, 1941, the United States Army began working with Walt Disney at his studio, stationing military personnel there for the duration of the war. The Army and Disney set about making various types of films for several different audiences. Most films meant for the public included some type of propaganda, while films for the troops included training and education about a given topic.

Films intended for the public were often meant to build morale. They allowed Americans to release their anger and frustration through ridicule and crude humor. Many films simply reflected the war culture and were pure entertainment. Others carried strong messages meant to arouse public involvement or set a public mood.

== Animation supporting the war effort ==
War bonds perhaps received the most advertising and press. Animated cartoons allowed the government to spread their message in a much more entertaining manner. Bugs Bunny Bond Rally is a classic cartoon depicting Bugs Bunny singing and dancing about war bonds. The film was given to Henry Morgenthau of the U.S. Treasury Department on Monday, December 15, 1941. It was during such World War II films that Bugs achieved his popularity and made him a national mascot. Other films that encouraged buying war bonds included Foney Fables, Donald’s Decision, The Thrifty Pig, 7 Wise Dwarfs and All Together. In these short films, either subtly or directly, the characters are portrayed doing their part by spending less and using their savings to buy war savings certificates and investing in victory.

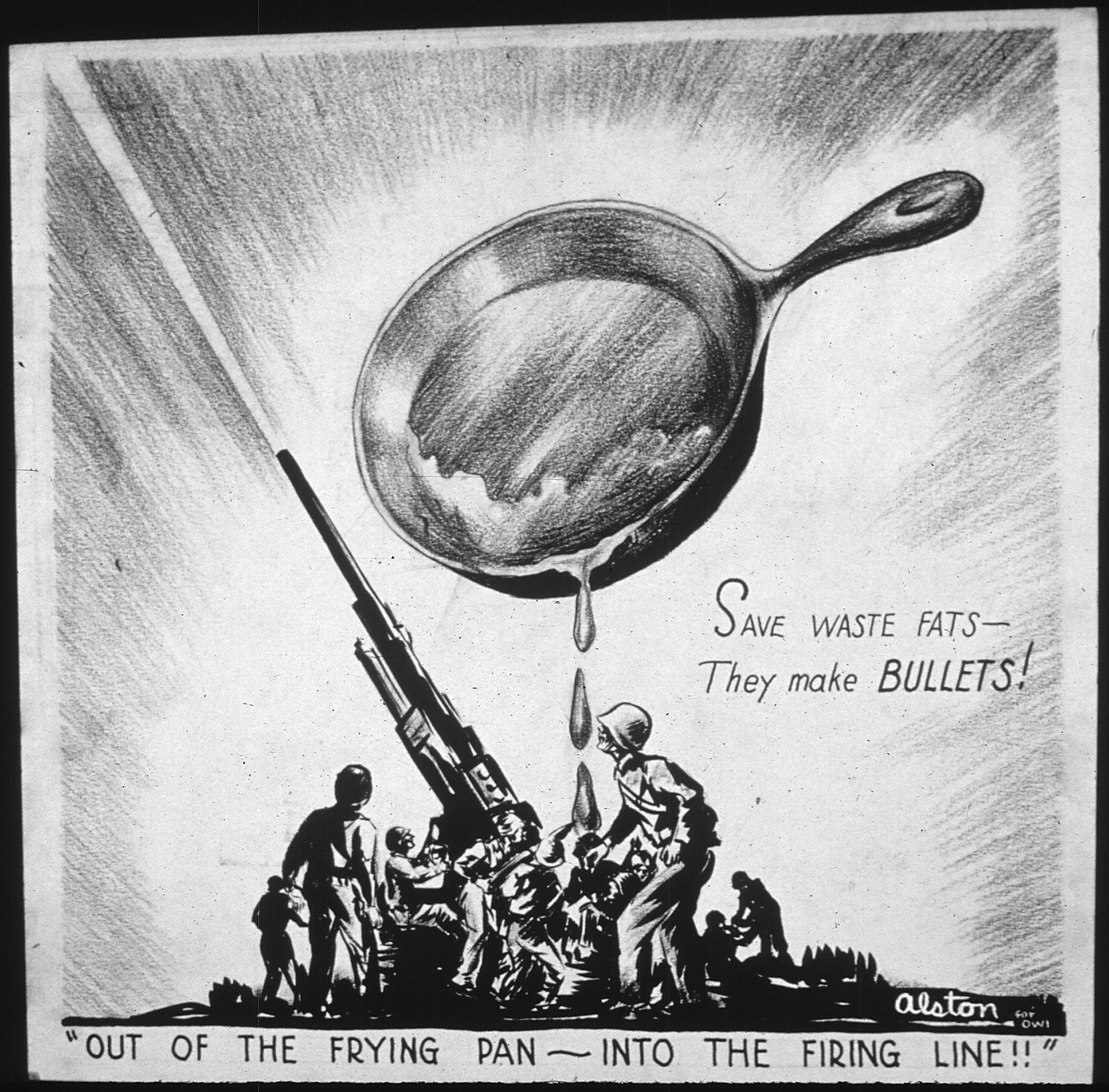
"Save Waste Fats, They Make Bullets!"

Donating scrap metal was another means by which Americans could help support the war effort. Scrap Happy Daffy was a short film that encouraged such patriotic acts. Daffy defends his scrap yard against a metal-eating Nazi goat sent by an irate Adolf Hitler. The cartoon asks citizens to donate to the war effort by listing items which can be given to scrap yards around the country. It also educates citizens about Hitler's spies and spoilers who try to hinder such war efforts. Other films pleading for scrap metal include Ding Dong Daddy and Foney Fables. Pluto and Minnie Mouse contributed to the war effort by encouraging civilians to recycle their cooking grease so it could be used for making explosives in Out of the Frying Pan Into the Firing Line.

The government also used animation studios like Walt Disney to encourage people to pay their taxes promptly. In the New Spirit, Donald Duck listens attentively to the radio as it tells him about the importance of paying his income taxes. It details how to fill out a new tax form for households making less than $3,000.00. In Spirit of ’43 Donald is caught in a conundrum to either spend his money in frivolous pursuits, which aids the Axis, or save his money so he can pay his taxes and support the war effort. In both of these films, paying taxes is described as a right and a privilege and should be done gladly and proudly for the war effort. "Taxes run the factories which make the war supplies" according to the narrator in the cartoon. Spirit of ’43 blames Hitler and Hirohito for the high taxes.

The Disney team was also commissioned by the government’s agricultural division to make a short film about food in America. The film highlighted the importance of the American farmer and alleviated fears about food supplies by giving detailed numbers on America's considerable agricultural production. The films created to support this effort included Food Will Win the War and The Grain that Built a Hemisphere. Characters in Foney Fables ridiculed characters who stockpiled food. A Tale of Two Kitties, encouraged civilians to grow their own food in victory gardens so there would be food for troops.

== Training and instructional animation ==
Animation was co-opted in the 1940s for training purposes. Disney produced Four Methods of Flush Riveting for Lockheed Martin's engineers. The Army Air Force, Navy, and Bureau of Aeronautics also commissioned and supervised films. Animations were written to train pilots and ground crewmen about The Occluded Fronts, Thunderstorms, and The Warm Front. Because of the sensitive content displayed in Aircraft Wood Repair, the word “RESTRICTED” was the first word displayed in the film which discussed the type of glue used for wooden aircraft. Other films made to help train pilots included Theory of the C-1 AUTOPILOT: Part One Basic Principles which introduced pilots to the autopilot function which was new to aircraft at the time. Wings Engines Fuselage Tail was a short film that taught servicemen how to best identify aircraft quickly. The Navy did a similar film called The 3-Point System which trained servicemen how to identify U.S. cruisers. Rules of the Nautical Road was a naval training film geared towards officers that recreated a historical catastrophe, which was meant to encourage officers to study nautical rules and principles.

The most elaborate training film, Disney's Stop That Tank!, was commissioned by the Canadian Directorate of Military Training. This 21-minute full-color cartoon was intended for Canadian infantrymen assigned the Boys anti-tank rifle. The first few minutes of the cartoon depict Hitler and his tanks being defeated by the Allies using the new rifle. The film continues in a largely more serious vein, showing how the weapon is to be used and cleaned.

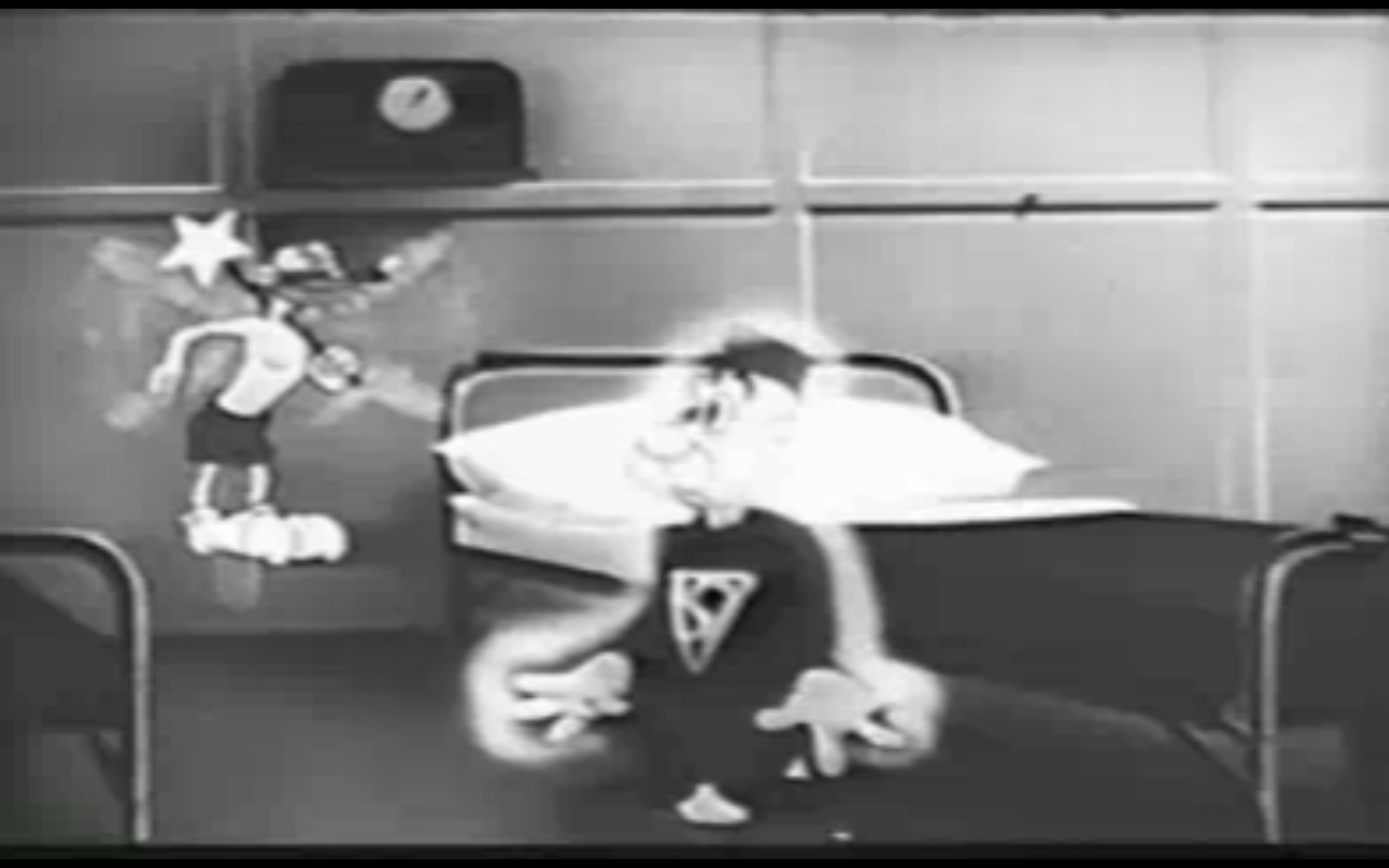
Snafuperman

The regular G.I. was also a target of animation and many films directed toward him explicitly instructed him on how to behave. Those in the Army and Marine Corps were familiar with the names Private Snafu and Lance Corporal Schmuckatelli. These fictional characters gave soldiers safety briefs. One film titled Snafuperman depicts a G.I., Private Snafu, who disdains studying and reading. He is given special powers but uses them to the almost detriment of the United States because he did not study and know the difference between his own side and the enemy. At the conclusion of the film, he recognizes the need for an education. The appropriately titled film Booby Traps uses Private Snafu to show the dangers and the caution needed to be taken in the case of such malicious devices. Spies once again portrays Private Snafu acting counter to what he has been told. The intoxicated G.I. gives secrets to a woman who is really a Nazi spy. Through the information he gives her, the Germans are able to bomb the ship Private Snafu is traveling on, sending him to hell.

== Political animation ==
Animation was used for political campaigning. The United States Auto Workers commissioned Warner Brothers to produce Hell-Bent for Election, which supported Franklin Delano Roosevelt's presidential bid. The film was “so pertinent and even Socialist in nature, that theaters never showed this piece” though it was shown to its own members at meetings and rallies.

Some films were more potent with propagandistic symbolism than others. Fifth Column Mouse is a cartoon that through childlike humor and political undertones depicted a possible outcome of World War II. The film begins with a bunch of mice playing and singing a song about how they never worry. One mouse notices a cat looking in through a window, but is calmed when another mouse tells him that the cat cannot get inside. The cat however, bursts in through the front door alerting a mouse that wears a World War II style air raid warden helmet and screams, “Lights out,” promptly turning off the main light. The phrase, 'lights out,' was a popular saying during the war, especially in major cities to encourage people to turn off their lights to hinder targeting by potential enemy bombers. The same mouse who said the cat could not get inside, ends up getting caught by the cat. The cat tells him that he will not kill him, but will give him cheese if the mouse follows the cat's instructions. During the dialogue between the two, the cat's smile resembles the Tojo bucktooth grin and it speaks with a Japanese accent. Near the end, the cat screams “Now get going!” and the mouse jumps to attention and gives the infamous Nazi salute. The scene cuts to the biddable mouse, now an agent of influence, telling the other mice that the cat is here to “save us and not to enslave us,” “don’t be naughty mice, but appease him” so “hurry and sign a truce.” This message of appeasement and signing a truce would have been all too familiar to the adults in the theaters who were probably with their children. The next clip is of the cat lounging on pillows with multiple mice tending to its every need. However, when the cat reveals that he wants to eat a mouse they all scatter. Inside their hole, a new mouse is encouraging the others to be strong and fight the cat. The mice are then shown marching in step with hardy, confident grins on their faces with “We Did it Before and We Can Do it Again” by Robert Merrill playing in the background. Amidst the construction of a secret weapon, a poster of a mouse with a rifle is shown with the bold words “For Victory: Buy Bonds and Stamps.” The mice have built a mechanical dog that chases the cat out of the house. Before he leaves though, a mouse skins the cat with an electric razor, but leaves three short dots and a long streak of fur on his back. In Morse code, the letter "V" is produced through dot-dot-dot-dash. As depicted in many pictures but made popular by Winston Churchill, the “V” for victory sign was a popular symbol of encouragement for the Allies. The cartoon ends with the mice singing, “We did it before, we did it AGAIN!”

Der Fuehrer's Face is one of the most popular propaganda cartoons produced by Walt Disney. In Harold D. Lasswell's Propaganda Technique in World War I, he states “It is always difficult for many simple minds inside a nation to attach personal traits to so dispersed an entity as a whole nation. They need to hate some individual on whom to pin their hate. It is, therefore, important to single out a handful of enemy leaders and load them down with the whole Decalogue of sins.” In World War I, the Kaiser drew much hate rhetoric and comic relief from the Allies. In World War II Adolf Hitler drew similar negative attention. This film helped relieve aggression through ridicule toward an icon that was the source of so much destruction. The cartoon was originally titled Donald Duck in Nutsy Land, but the title was changed when the title song produced by Olliver Wallace became a sensational hit, titled Der Fuehrer’s Face.

The short film starts out with Wallace's song playing in the background while a comical band of Nazi "super-duper supermen" perform. Disney pokes fun of Hitler's Germany by depicting Donald eating breakfast by only spraying the scent of bacon and eggs onto his breath and dipping a single coffee bean into his cup of water. Hitler had promised the Germans great wealth and vast stores of food. Disney and the Army knew this and wanted to depict the Germans living in a land that was hollow of all the wonderful promises that Hitler made. Producers of the cartoon also wished to show that the working conditions of the factories were not as glorious as Hitler was making them sound in his speeches. Donald is worked continuously with very little compensation and time off. Though it seems Donald goes crazy he soon wakes up from his nightmare and is forever thankful for being a citizen of the United States of America.

Education for Death was a very serious film that Disney produced. This cartoon was based on a best selling book Education for Death written by Gregor Ziemer. The film shows how a young boy in Nazi Germany is indoctrinated and brain washed at an early age and learns to follow and not think outside of what the government tells him. This short is both educational but also provides comedic relief by mocking Hitler. The film is both shocking in its content and despairing in its ending.

The film begins with the narrator asking how Nazis are born and developed. The story takes the audience to the child's academic beginning in kindergarten. Children's stories are often adapted to meet the state's needs, so characters and plot lines are often changed. In the story, the Wicked Witch is known as democracy, while Sleeping Beauty is Germany and the knight that saves her is played by Hitler. The cartoon depicts this story in a rather short fashion, but also depicts the two main characters (Hitler and Germany) ridiculously. On a more serious note, the cartoon next shows the child and his schoolmates in a class giving the infamous Heil Hitler salute repeatedly. However, the young boy becomes sick and the narrator informs the audience that unless the child becomes better again he will be taken away, being denounced unfit and will never be heard from again. However, he does recover and returns to school where he gives his daily pledge to fight, obey, and die for his Fuehrer. The boy answers a question incorrectly and is publicly humiliated. The lesson that the young boy learns later is that weakness is not to be tolerated and that the world belongs to the strong and brutal. The next few scenes show a book burning demonstration where books and other famous works are burned after being declared illegal by the state. Icons such as the Holy Bible are replaced with Mein Kampf and an image of the crucifix is replaced with a sword that has the Nazi swastika on it. Fast-forwarding a few years, the boy is older and is marching first as a teenage Hitler youth and then eventually as a soldier. The narrator ends the cartoon with the words, “His education is complete, his education for death” as a vast German army fades into a cemetery with crosses over thousands of graves.

Reason and Emotion (Walt Disney Academy Awards) is another film that attempts to help Americans at home understand how Germany became entranced under the influence of Hitler and Goebbels and how they themselves can resist such propaganda. The film depicts what damage can be done when individuals allow their reasoning and common sense to be overtaken by their emotions. As the narrator speaks, images of newspapers with contradictory and emotionally charged titles flash back and forth. The film is meant to show how headlines and news create chaos if individuals allow themselves to believe everything they hear. The narrator explains how Adolf Hitler preys upon those who let fear and emotion rule them. The cartoon cuts to an animated Hitler controlling Germans through fear, sympathy, pride, and hate. The film ends with reason and emotion being told that they must work together with reason ruling over one's actions while emotions are to be focused on staying positive in the fight ahead.

Chicken Little (1943) is similar to 5th Column Mouse in that it depicts how the Nazis tried to instill fear into their enemies. The cartoon begins with a barnyard scene which introduces the main characters: “Cocky Locky” is depicted as the leader of, “Henny Lenny” is the gossip queen, “Turkey Lurkey” is shown as the educated elite, and “Chicken Little", the dunce. The animals are all seen as happy because of a large fence protecting them. However, “Foxy Loxy” wants to get in and uses a book entitled "Psychology" to not just get one chicken, but “get them all” by aiming for the least intelligent chicken in order to eventually influence the masses. It also instructs that, if telling a lie, it is best to make it a big one. The fox then convinces Chicken Little that the sky is falling. Chicken Little initially convinces the barnyard that the sky is falling, leading to panic. Cocky Locky steps onto the scene to calm the situation explaining that Chicken Little was not hit on the head by a piece of the sky. The crowd is dispersed with Chicken Little left crying and ashamed. The fox then realizes that he must “undermine the faith of the masses in their leaders” according to the psychology book. The fox then convinces Henny Lenny and her gossiping crowd that Cocky Locky may be wrong and if so, they will all be killed. The fox then convinces Turkey Lurkey and his educated elite that Cocky Locky is displaying “totalitarian tendencies and is trying to dictate to us.” The fox next reads, “By the use of flattery, insignificant people can be made to look at themselves as born leaders.” Chicken Little is convinced by the fox that everyone will listen to him now and should save all the other animals and tell them what to do. When the animals begin to fear for their lives and ask to know what to do, Chicken Little, who is a puppet of the fox, tells them to run to the cave. When they all run inside the fox ties a napkin around his neck and announces, “dinner is served.” The film quite unashamedly got across the message the dangers of creating panic and not using logic and reason in a time of crisis. The book Foxy read early in the film was originally intended to be Mein Kampf, however the producers thought that this might come across as too strong to the audience.

Victory Through Air Power was one of Walt Disney's most ambitious wartime propaganda films. Walt Disney himself was impressed by a 1942 book entitled Victory Through Air Power written by Alexander P. de Seversky. The Russian-born, naturalized citizen, who had founded his own aircraft company, was convinced that the only way to win the war was the use of a long range strategic bomber force. Disney thought it his patriotic duty to spread the word of this new strategic plan involving tactical long-range bombing. Winston Churchill viewed the film and convinced Franklin D. Roosevelt to see it. After Roosevelt watched the film, the United States began committing to long-range bomber airplanes and strategies.

== See also ==
- Golden age of American animation
- Walt Disney's World War II propaganda production
- Bugs & Daffy: The Wartime Cartoons
- Ace in the Hole (1942 film)
- Propaganda film
- American propaganda during World War II
- Animated cartoon
