= Walt Disney Animation Studios short films =

Walt Disney Animation Studios logo

This is a directory of lists relating to animated short films that have been produced by Walt Disney Animation Studios from 1928 to the present.

This list does not include:

- Films produced by Laugh-O-Gram Studio (see Laugh-O-Gram Studio#Filmography)
- Films produced by Winkler Pictures (Alice Comedies, Oswald the Lucky Rabbit)
- Full-length animated feature films (see List of Walt Disney Animation Studios films)
- Segments of feature-length package films later released individually (see List of Disney theatrical animated features)
- Animated cartoon segments originally made for television (e.g. Mickey Mouse Works, House of Mouse or the Mickey Mouse TV series)
- Short films which contain animation but are primarily live-action (see List of Disney live-action shorts)
- Short films which contain no new animation (i.e., films re-edited from other films)
- Short films produced by other animation studios like Pixar, Disneytoon Studios, or 20th Century Animation

Note: A gold star indicates an Academy Award for Best Animated Short Film, while a silver star indicates a nomination.

== See also ==
=== Intersecting lists of shorts ===
- List of Walt Disney Animation Studios films
- Laugh-O-Gram Studio
- Alice Comedies
- List of Oswald the Lucky Rabbit shorts
- Mickey Mouse film series
- Silly Symphonies
- Donald Duck film series
- Pluto film series
- Goofy film series
- List of Walt Disney's World War II productions for Armed Forces
- List of unproduced Disney animated shorts and feature films
- List of Disney live-action shorts
- List of Pixar shorts

=== Related television series ===
- Disney anthology television series (1954–1983)
  - Ludwig Von Drake
- DuckTales (1987–1990)
- Chip 'n Dale Rescue Rangers (1989–1990)
- Goof Troop (1992)
- Bonkers (1993–1994, cameo)
- Quack Pack (1996)
- Mickey Mouse Works (1999–2000)
- House of Mouse (2001–2003)
- Mickey Mouse Clubhouse (2006–2016)
- Mickey Mouse (2013–2019)
- Mickey Mouse Mixed-Up Adventures (2017–2021)
- DuckTales (2017–2021)
- The Wonderful World of Mickey Mouse (2020–2023)
- Mickey Mouse Funhouse (2021–2025)
- Mickey Mouse Clubhouse+ (2025–present)

=== Other ===
- Walt Disney Home Video (VHS)
- Walt Disney Cartoon Classics
- List of Disney feature-length home entertainment releases
- "Walt Disney Treasures"
- "Walt Disney's Funny Factory"
- "Walt Disney's Classic Cartoon Favorites"
- "Walt Disney's It's a Small World of Fun!"
- List of Disney theatrical animated features
- List of TV series produced by Walt Disney Studios
- List of Disney video games
- List of Mickey Mouse universe media

==== Disney Interactive ====
- Blank: A Vinylmation Love Story
- Cranes in Love

== Bibliography ==
- Amendola, Dana (2015). All Aboard: The Wonderful World of Disney Trains (1st ed.). Disney Editions. ISBN 978-1-4231-1714-8.
