= Walt Disney's World War II propaganda production =

1941–1945 American anti-Nazi filmmaking

Between 1941 and 1945, during World War II, Walt Disney and his company were involved in the production of anti-Nazi and anti-Japanese propaganda films for the U.S. government. The widespread familiarity of Disney's productions benefited the U.S. government in producing pro-American war propaganda in an effort to increase support for the war.

== Disney's involvement ==
=== The early 1940s - Walt Disney Studios' financial crisis ===
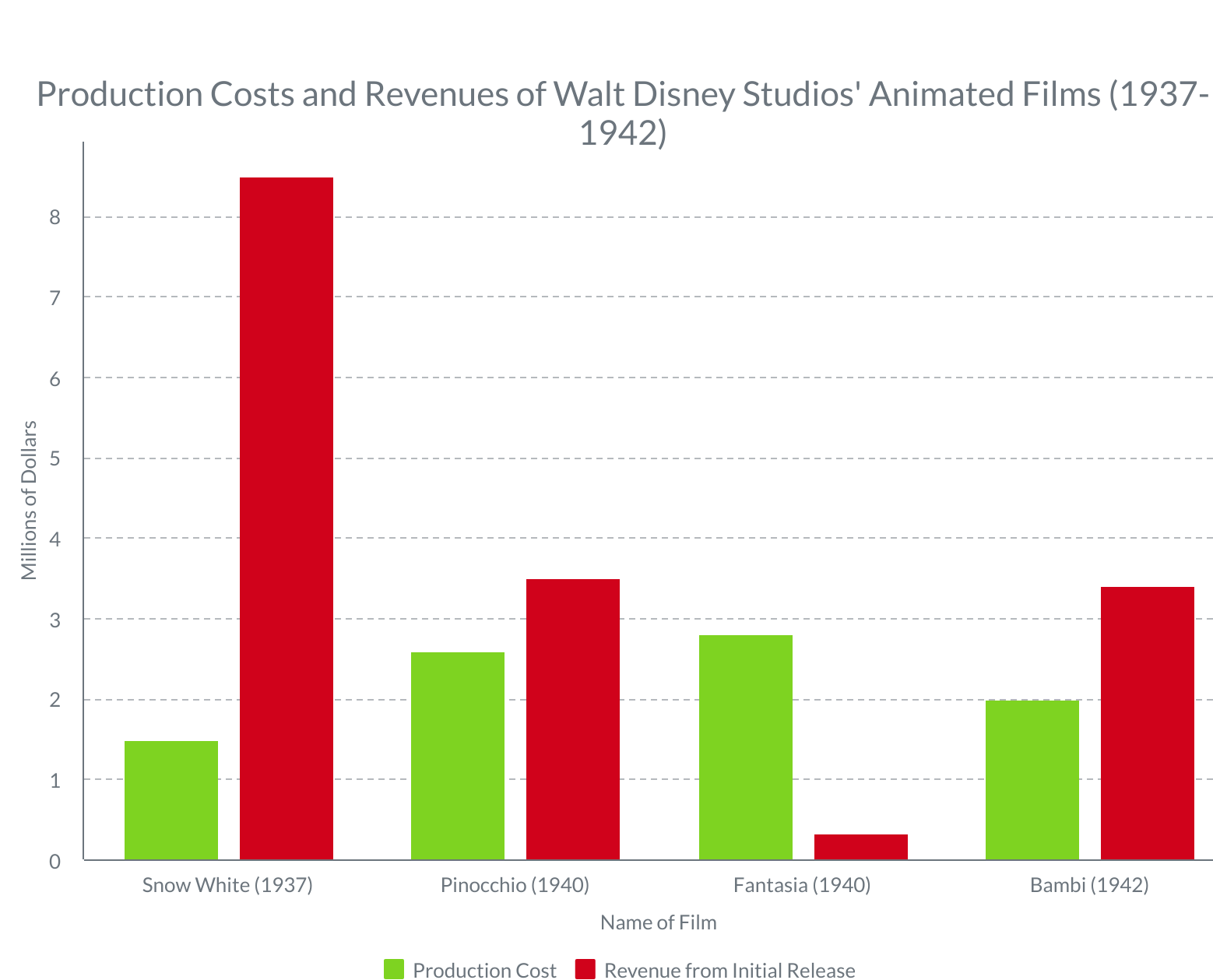
Production costs and revenues of Walt Disney Studios' Animated Films (1937-1942)

Leading into World War II, Walt Disney Studios was on the verge of bankruptcy. While Walt Disney studios had entered the early 1940s with major profits from films like Snow White which had seen high revenues, Walt Disney had a tendency to use all profits from released films towards the production of new ones. In 1941, with the release of Fantasia, this policy led to severe economic loss within the company. Walt Disney spent four times more than his planned budget on the production of Fantasia which totaled about $2.8 million. However, Fantasia did not receive the attention Walt Disney thought it would. The release of the film was met with low attendance and poor reviews. In its road-shows of the film, Walt Disney Studios made only $325,000. The studio lost about the equivalent of $15 million (2015 dollars). Other films like Pinocchio also failed to bring in the profits Walt Disney predicted because the war in Europe had prevented European moviegoers from seeing the film, minimizing the studio's foreign revenue. With the extreme loss in profits and revenue, Walt Disney Studios, unable to keep its large number of employees on the payroll, laid off many of its animators. This led to a labor strike of nearly half of the studio's remaining 800 employees in the spring of 1941. The strike went on for four weeks until Walt Disney agreed to join a labor union. As Walt Disney handled negotiations with the labor union, Roy Disney attempted to persuade the studio's main distributors to invest more money in the film company, trying to secure more production funds for the studio which could no longer afford to offset production costs with employee layoffs. Roy was unsuccessful in finding any new investments.

Walt Disney Studios entered the winter of 1941 still in a financial crisis. That December, after the surprise attack on Pearl Harbor by the Axis-affiliated Empire of Japan, 500 United States Army troops began an occupation of Walt Disney Studios in Burbank that would last for the next eight months—the only Hollywood film studio under military occupation in history. The soldiers were stationed there to protect a nearby Lockheed aircraft plant from the enemy air raids. While there, they converted parking garages into ammunition depots, and worked on fixing equipment in large soundstages. Soon after the start of the occupation, Walt Disney was approached with requests from the U.S. services to produce propaganda films. On December 8, Walt Disney settled on its first film contract with the Navy. The contract required that Disney produce twenty war-related animated shorts for the United States government for a compensation of $90,000 ($1,765,898.71 in 2023). Walt Disney Studios received $4,500 for each short it produced which was significantly higher than its standard profit for shorts. Other branches of the government, including the Army Air Forces, the Department of Agriculture, and the Treasury Department, rapidly caught on to Disney's creative approach to generating educational films, propaganda, and insignias and offered additional agreements. Considering the impact of the agreements made between the U.S. services and Walt Disney Studios, scholar Gerard Raiti suggests that "if it weren't for the U.S. Military, the Walt Disney Company might not exist today"; the compensation the studio received from these contracts may have been the reason Walt Disney Studios recovered from the economic turmoil of early 1941.

=== Overview of propaganda production ===
During World War II, Disney made films for every branch of the United States Armed Forces and government. This was accomplished through the use of animated graphics by means of expediting the intelligent mobilization of servicemen and civilians for the cause of the war. Over 90% of Disney employees were devoted to the production of training and propaganda films for the government. Throughout the duration of the war, Disney produced over 400,000 feet of educational war films, most at cost, which is equal to 68 hours of continuous films. In 1943 alone, 204,000 feet of film was produced.

As well as producing films for different government divisions from 1942 to 1943, Disney was asked to create animation for a series of pictures produced by Colonel Frank Capra for the U.S. Army. This series included films such as Prelude to War and America goes to War. Although these films were originally intended for servicemen, they were released to theaters because of their popularity.

These propaganda and educational films sought to educate Americans and children on the specifics of the war (countries, political figures, etc), and what it means to be a part of a war effort, whether it be at the home front or the front lines. This included short cartoons about getting drafted, ways to contribute to the war effort from home, creating caricatures of political figures such as Adolf Hitler and Benito Mussolini, creating common enemies that children can comprehend (like the Big Bad Wolf), and boosting spirit and morale. These films were encouraging Americans to want to be a part of the war and do their part as citizens so that America can be victorious.

=== The Navy productions ===
The Navy first requested 90,000 feet of film to be ready in three months. The purpose of these films was to educate sailors on navigation tactics. This was a shock for Disney, as he was used to creating 27,000 feet of film in a year.

The Office of the Coordinator of Inter-American Affairs also requested educational films for aviation branches of the navy and not compact tactics to ground crew aircraft maintenance.

=== The Treasury Department productions ===
Disney created The New Spirit (1942) after a request from the Secretary of the Treasury, Henry Morgenthau Jr., to make Americans accept the payment of income taxes. The film was followed by a rushed sequel The Spirit of '43 (1943). In this film, Donald Duck deals with income taxes and shows their benefit to the American war effort. The film was seen by 26 million people. In a later Gallup poll 37% admitted that the film played a factor in their willingness to pay taxes. Disney also made a book for children to try to encourage them to purchase War Savings stamps.

=== The Army Air Forces (USAAF or AAF) productions ===
Aerology film production was supervised by naval aviation experts and some members of Disney's team learned how to fly to better understand the problems the Army Air Forces encountered. Victory Through Air Power (1943) is one of the propaganda films Disney produced for air warfare. This film is an attempt to sell Major Alexander de Seversky's theories about the practical uses of long range strategic bombing. The animated film humorously tells about the development of air warfare and then switches to the Major illustrating how his ideas could win the war for the Allies.

=== Propaganda productions ===
As requested by the U.S. Government, Walt Disney created a number of anti-German and anti-Japanese films for the servicemen and the U.S. public. He wanted to portray these countries and their leaders as manipulative without morals. A few of the films he produced were Reason and Emotion (1943), Der Fuehrer's Face (1943), Education for Death - The Making of a Nazi (1943), Commando Duck (1944), and Donald Gets Drafted (1942).

Donald Gets Drafted starred Donald Duck who gets conscripted into the United States army. The film gave the American public a look into the life of a US soldier, showing Donald getting a medical examination and speaking with his army sergeant (played by Pete). According to film historian Dr. Tracey Mollet, "due to the speed at which [the] film was made and released", for many Americans, it gave the first glimpse into "the reality of life in the forces, before many of them had heard about it from friends, neighbors, or even loved ones".

In Der Fuehrer's Face, Donald Duck experiences a day in a Nazi country where he has to make do with eating ridiculous Nazi food rations (smell of bacon and eggs, coffee made with one bean, and a slice of wood-like stale bread), experiences a day at a Nazi artillery factory and breaks down. He wakes up realizing that the experience was a nightmare, embraces a model of the Statue of Liberty and exclaims "Am I glad to be a citizen of the United States of America!" Der Fuehrer's Face went on to win the Academy Award for Best Cartoon Short Film.

Education for Death - The Making of a Nazi was a wartime propaganda film that takes on the perspective of Hans, a young German boy. As the film progresses and Hans is exposed to Hitler youth and the Nazi culture, his ability to value human life decreases. In Commando Duck, Donald destroys an entire Japanese airbase singlehandedly.

For the National Film Board of Canada, Walt Disney Studios remade Disney's classic "Three Little Pigs" into "The Thrifty Pig". They reimagined the Big Bad Wolf to represent Nazi Germany, and they redesigned the strongest house material into war bonds. This reconfiguring of the characters paints a very clear picture to impressionable audiences by grouping the Nazis and Germany with the word "Bad" and a villain in the classic story. The Practical Pig warns his brothers to build their house with "War Savings Certificate" bricks in order for their houses to have a solid defense against the Wolf. The classic story unfolds with both pigs running into the Practical Pig's house, and when the Wolf tries to blow it down, it withstands the wind. The Wolf then runs away as the Practical Pig throws the bond bricks at him. This short film aims to show viewers the importance and benefits of investing in war bonds.

== Other forms of propaganda ==
In addition to producing films at the request of the government and military forces, Disney utilized other forms of media and arts to boost morale on the home front. They issued their own war bonds, posters, and books, remastered older cartoons like "The Three Little Pigs and the Big Bad Wolf," and created a variety of cartoons that went beyond depicting Donald Duck going to war. Some shorts featured Minnie, a housewife at home, doing her part in saving her bacon grease that could be then used to make ammunition for the war. It was said that "Disney's entire stable of characters was employed in the name of patriotism, and by 1943 newspapers were reporting that up to 90 percent of the Disney studio's work was for government agencies." Through their work, Disney reimagined their image and firmly embedded Disney and its characters into the core values and spirit of American culture.

Disney's propaganda efforts with films were not limited to the War but extended into efforts to form lasting and impactful bonds with South American cultures. The 1942 animated film Saludos Amigos and the 1944 live-action and animated film The Three Caballeros each showed an effort by the Walt Disney Company to play a role in community building between nations. For the very first time, the settings of these movies moved from the United States to Southern nations, featuring Donald Duck traveling to places such as Mexico and Brazil. Both of these films chose to highlight Latin American culture in a way that had not been seen before by viewers in the U.S., showcasing vibrant local traditions, music, and landscapes. This strategic use of film to invigorate relationships can be traced back to the Good Neighbor Policy, a strategy created by Franklin D. Roosevelt that sought to stimulate influence with neighboring countries through trade and diplomacy rather than the threat of military action. With the mounting threats of Communism, the Roosevelt administration saw this policy as an effective way of formulating bonds that would help bring in and maintain these nations within its sphere of influence. As a result, both films played a crucial role in introducing and celebrating Latin American cultures in a fun and innovative way, fostering a sense of camaraderie and respect between audiences in the U.S. and their neighbors to the south.

== See also ==
- The Walt Disney Company
  - List of Walt Disney's World War II productions for Armed Forces
- United States home front during World War II
- American propaganda during World War II
- Propaganda film
- World War II and American animation
