= The New Spirit =

1942 Donald Duck cartoon

- Theatrical release poster
- Directed by: Wilfred Jackson; Ben Sharpsteen
- Story by: Joe Grant; Dick Huemer
- Produced by: Walt Disney
- Starring: Clarence Nash
- Narrated by: Fred Shields
- Music by: Oliver Wallace
- Animation by: Ed Aardal; Andy Engman; Dan MacManus; Josh Meador; Don Patterson
- Layouts by: Kendall O'Connor
- Color process: Technicolor
- Production companies: U.S. Department of the Treasury; Walt Disney Productions
- Distributed by: War Activities Committee of the Motion Pictures Industry
- Release date: January 23, 1942; (USA)
- Running time: 7 minutes
- Country: United States
- Language: English

The New Spirit is a 1942 American animated short film produced by Walt Disney Productions and the U.S. Department of the Treasury, and released by the War Activities Committee of the Motion Pictures Industry. The cartoon, which stars Donald Duck, was the first film created as part of Walt Disney's World War II propaganda production. It was commissioned by Henry Morgenthau Jr., then Secretary of the Treasury, to encourage American citizens to pay their income tax in support of the war effort. The film was directed by Wilfred Jackson and Ben Sharpsteen, and features Clarence Nash as the voice of Donald, Fred Shields as the radio announcer, and Cliff Edwards singing the theme song.

The New Spirit was nominated for the Academy Award for Best Documentary at the 15th Academy Awards, an honor it shared with 24 other films. The following year, Disney released The Spirit of '43 which had a similar purpose and reused many of the scenes from The New Spirit.

== Plot ==
The film begins with Donald Duck, flush with the contemporary patriotic spirit present with the United States' full entry into World War II, dancing to a patriotic song. A radio announcer tells about the new patriotic spirit and asks Donald if he is willing to do his part. Donald fervently asserts his loyalty and begs to know how best to show it. His enthusiasm fades when the radio announcer advises he pay his income tax promptly, but the announcer changes Donald's mind by stressing the country's need for resources to aid the war effort.

Now that Donald is motivated once again, the announcer, along with the help of a talking dip pen, inkwell, blotter, and note pad, show Donald how to properly fill out his simplified Form 1040 A. After this the announcer urges Donald to mail his payment to the Federal government at once, and Donald enthusiastically races across the nation to Washington, D.C. to deliver it in person.

The film concludes with a montage of images to illustrate to the audience the wartime necessities the money is needed for such as munitions and combat vehicles to defeat the Axis powers. With a final image framed in a sky lined with red, white and blue, the announcer repeats The Four Freedoms and reminds the audience that taxes are essential for victory and will keep democracy on the march.

== Voice cast ==
- Clarence Nash as Donald Duck
- Fred Shields as Narrator / Radio Announcer
- Cliff Edwards as the Singer

== Background ==
Under the Revenue Act of 1942, approximately 15 million American citizens would become eligible to pay income tax for the first time. In anticipation of the law's passing, Secretary of the Treasury Henry Morgenthau Jr. requested that Disney produce a film to cast the tax increase in a positive light and to explain why the government needed the money. A main part of the goal was to ensure that the taxes were paid on time, and to create as little resentment among the public as possible.

However, there was significant disagreement between Walt Disney and Morgenthau on who should star in the film. After Disney presented a storyboard of the film in Washington, Morgenthau said that he did not like Donald Duck, and preferred instead a new character to represent "Mr. Average Taxpayer". This, he thought, could better convey the seriousness of the issue, but Disney was adamant that Donald be used. The duck was at the time the studio's biggest star, and Disney felt that using him could make a painful task as fun as possible. Disney eventually got his way.

== Reception ==
Time magazine said that "although the cartoon does not make the new short-form blank crystal clear, it gets its propaganda across with the anesthetic blessing of laughter and great good humor. As cinema, The New Spirit is a most effective job." It added, somewhat tongue in cheek, that "Bachelor Duck has complained about a lot of things, but his salary ($2,501) is not one of them. Its revelation is pure patriotism on his part." At the 15th Academy Awards the next year the film was one of 25 films nominated for the Academy Award for Best Documentary Feature.

Among the public, the film created its desired effect, income taxes were more prompt in 1942 than in any year previous. Historians have cited Gallup Polls to show more than 60 million people saw the short in theaters, and it contributed to an increase of twice as many income tax filings from the previous year.

Despite the film's response, members of Congress did not appropriate $80,000 for the production. The U.S. Treasury had to fund the film from different sources.

== Adaptations ==
A comic strip version of The New Spirit was published in Look magazine. This version of the story was shorter, and ended with Donald actually mailing the tax form.

== Home media ==
The short was released on May 18, 2004, on Walt Disney Treasures: Walt Disney on the Front Lines.

== See also ==
- List of World War II short films
- American propaganda during World War II
- The Spirit of '43, the 1943 sequel film to The New Spirit.
