= Vinylmation =

Brand of Disney toy

- Company: Disney

Vinylmation is a brand of 1.5", 3", and 9" vinyl collectible toys sold at Disney theme parks, select Disney Stores, and the online Disney Store. The name Vinylmation is a combination of the word Animation and Vinyl. Most figures are shaped with the body of Mickey Mouse but have different themed markings, colors, and patterns. This means that figures have round mouse ears, whether or not the original character has them. This is accommodated by painting the ears with backgrounds - stars, stripes, rainbows - to match the original character. The series exception is the Park Starz series which does not resemble Mickey at all, and more closely resembles iconic figures from the parks. Vinylmation was introduced in July 2008, and the first figures were introduced in November that year.

After a surge of releases between 2010 and 2014, the toy line began to decline around 2015, and ceased production until a 2022 revival.

== Trading ==
Walt Disney World and Disneyland Resorts have recently stopped official trading because vinylmations are considered "collectibles" not "traders". However, despite Disney's ban on trading, trading still happens between private collections.

Around 2020-2024, online trading became prevalent, with sites appearing dedicated to trading and trading news. A web app is available where Vinylmation collectors can go to organize their collections, get detailed information about every Vinylmation made to date, trade their Vinylmation, and buy Vinylmation.

Vinylmation figurines are tradeable through friends, clubs, or other owners of Vinylmation figurines. At some locations, old or dulled figurines can be traded for new figurines.

== Packaging ==
Vinylmation figures are sold in sealed packaging. The purchaser does not know which figure they are buying until they have opened it. Each figure belongs to a series of 8, 12, or 24. All of the figures in a series are printed on the packaging and the series itself comes in a large box on display at the point of purchase. Each series has one unknown figure, called "the chaser." Some figures come with cards, stickers, or another figure to make a set. In addition to being a mystery figure, the chaser is also one of the rarer figures in each series. However, in addition to the chaser, there are also variants which are randomly inserted into cases at a lower rate than the chaser. The variant is a different version of one of the vinyls in the series.

Limited edition nine-inch figures are also sold and these are visible without opening the packaging. There is also a 1.5-inch Vinylmation Jr. size.

3" figures can be purchased by the case. Each case comes with 24 vinyls containing at least 2 of each known design, and 1 mystery chaser. To accommodate the chaser, one of the 11 known designs appears 3 times in a case.

In groups called eaches a single "3 mystery figure and a variant version of the figure.

== Series ==
There are various series to choose from: Below are a list of popular series previously released.

- Park series feature designs relating to Disney theme park attractions and characters.
- Urban series vinyls have designs that are more open-ended than Park vinyls as they do not need to relate to Disney or its theme parks.
- Eachez series, limited edition blind boxes container 1 of 2 possible vinyls at a ratio of 9:10 or 1:10.
- Park Starz series, featuring park characters.
- Cutesters series
- Holiday series
- Vinylmation Jr series
- Open Edition series, where buyers know what figure they are getting. There are many sub-series, such as Phineas and Ferb series, Nerds series, Sports series, Bakery series, Big Eyes series, Walt Disney World 40th Anniversary, Disney Vacation Club series, and others.
- Gravity Falls series
- Limited Release series, which includes The Nightmare Before Christmas series, Toy Story series, Pirates of the Caribbean series, Brave series and others.
- Limited Edition series, which includes Disney Afternoon series, Sushi series, among the others.
- Commemorative & Events series
- Cast Exclusive series
- Animation series
- ONE-OF-A-KIND series
- Accessories series, featuring Ear Hat series
- Disney Store series, featuring New York City Exclusives series, Villains series, Furry Friends series, Disney's The Lion King series and more.
- Robots series
- Disney Cruise Line Exclusives series
- Monorail series, which includes Disney-Pixar Cars Series
- The Muppets series
- Mickey Mouse Club series
- Marvel Comics series
- Captain America: Civil War series
- Alice in Wonderland series
- Star Wars series
- Indiana Jones series
- Create Your Own series: This consists of blank 3" and 9" Vinylmation figures, with no artwork printed on them. These vinyls are available in several colors, including red, yellow, pink, purple, black, and white, as well as a glow-in-the-dark green version. Unlike the other series, buyers are aware of the color of vinyl they will buy prior to purchase by way of a window on the packaging. The purpose of blank Vinylmations is, similar to toys like the Munny by Kidrobot, to provide a three-dimensional canvas on which fans can play artist and draw, paint, or otherwise apply their own art or designs to the figure, creating their own one-of-a-kind piece of Disney art. To assist fans in customization, Disney has recently introduced decals, rhinestones, and colored pencils embellished with Vinylmation motifs to use in the creation of their figures. Blank or customized vinyls are not accepted for trade at Disney Parks.

== Movie Adaptation ==
in 2014, a short is made based on the toys called "Blank: A Vinylmation Love Story".
