= List of Walt Disney's World War II productions for Armed Forces =

The following is a list of training films produced for the United States Army and Navy by the Walt Disney Studio during World War II. Most of these films were not sole productions of Disney, but were collaborations with other entities such as the First Motion Picture Unit (FMPU) or Frank Capra's signal corps.

Disney only produced the animated portions of these films. Many Disney artists and animators (as well as artists from other animation studios) worked at FMPU simultaneously, so not all FMPU films that include animation are Disney products.

In many cases the studio did not receive credit, which has made the task of identification somewhat difficult. Additionally, many of these films were reissued and even retitled, re-numbered and even re-edited, so the original elements may not survive.

Th information on this list comes from various sources such as the long out of print book Donald Duck Joins Up by Richard Shale and other film indexes that deal with Army and Navy films.

== Production for Armed Forces ==
=== Propaganda series and films ===
Note: Walt Disney Productions is uncredited on all films in this section.

Client	Series title	Film title (total runtime)	Disney produced runtime	Date	Notes
U.S Army	Why We Fight	Prelude to War (53 min)	16 min	1942	This series was produced by Frank Capra; the Disney studio produced various animated inserts (maps). The entire series can be found at Archive.org.
U.S Army	Why We Fight	The Nazis Strike (40 min)	13 min	1943	This series was produced by Frank Capra; the Disney studio produced various animated inserts (maps). The entire series can be found at Archive.org
U.S Army	Why We Fight	Divide and Conquer (56 min)	? min	1943	This series was produced by Frank Capra; the Disney studio produced various animated inserts (maps). The entire series can be found at Archive.org
U.S Army	Why We Fight	The Battle of Russia (71 min)	8 min	1943	This series was produced by Frank Capra; the Disney studio produced various animated inserts (maps). The entire series can be found at Archive.org
U.S Army	—N/a	The Aleutian Islands [A.D.C. Project] aka Report from the Aleutians (45 min)	2 min	1943	Disney only produced animated inserts (maps) for this film. The film can be viewed online: The short film Report from the Aleutians (1943) is available for free viewing and download at the Internet Archive.
U.S Army	—N/a	Fast Company (unproduced)	1 min	1943	It's unknown what type of animation Disney produced for this unmade film, probably animated diagrams; it was to be co-produced with Frank Capra.
U.S Army	—N/a	Air Transport Command (24 min)	1 min	1943	Disney only produced animated inserts (maps) for this film. https://www.youtube.com/watch?v=m2_rjoqqEro
U.S Army	—N/a	Substitution and Conversion (unknown runtime)	20 min	1943	Disney only produced animated inserts (maps) for this film. Project 6021 https://www.youtube.com/watch?v=Y7jGTKhdZWM
U.S Army	Why We Fight	The Battle of Britain (51 min)	8 min	1944	This series was produced by Frank Capra; the Disney studio produced various animated inserts (maps). The entire series can be found at Archive.org
U.S Army	Why We Fight	The Battle of China (62 min)	? min	1944	This series was produced by Frank Capra; the Disney studio produced various animated inserts (maps). The entire series can be found at Archive.org
U.S Army	—N/a	Attack in the Pacific (52 min)	15 min	1944	Disney only produced animated inserts (maps) for this film. The short film Attack in the Pacific (1944) is available for free viewing and download at the Internet Archive.
U.S Army	Burma Campaign	The Stilwell Road (50 min)	8 min	1945	Burma Campaign was a series of three films but The Stilwell Road was the only one to include animated inserts (maps) produced by Disney. It can be found at Archive.org.
U.S Army	Job	Your Job in Germany (11 min)	2 min	1944	This series was co-created with Frank Capra. The companion film Our Job in Japan doesn't include any animation and had no Disney involvement. Your Job in Germany includes animated inserts (maps) produced by Disney and it can be viewed on The short film Your Job in Germany (1945) is available for free viewing and download at the Internet Archive.
U.S Army	—N/a	Battle of Cape Gloucester Also known as Attack! Battle of New Britain (58 min).	3 min	1944	Disney only produced animated inserts (maps) for this film. This film found online: The short film Attack - Battle of New Britain (1944) is available for free viewing and download at the Internet Archive.
U.S Army	—N/a	Two Down and One to Go (31 min)	9 min	1944	Disney only produced caricature still drawings of Hitler and co along with animated diagrams and maps. Shale's book erroneously gives the runtime as 17 minutes, as it has longer running time: https://www.youtube.com/watch?v=do1-nBjYjdY&ab_channel=USNational Archive's shortened version in BW was also released which is 9 minutes.
U.S Army	—N/a	It's Your War, Too (9 min)	1 min	1944	Disney only produced animated inserts (maps) for this film. The short film It's Your War Too (1944) is available for free viewing and download at the Internet Archive.
U.S Army	—N/a	The Case of the Tremendous Trifle (20 min)	2 min	1944	Disney only produced animated inserts (maps) for this film. The short film The Case of the Tremendous Trifle (1944) is available for free viewing and download at the Internet Archive.
U.S Army	Why We Fight	War Comes to America (64 min)	8 min	1945	This series was produced by Frank Capra; the Disney studio produced various animated inserts (maps) The entire series can be found at Archive.org
U.S Army	Know Your Enemies	Japan (63 min)	18 min	1945	This series was produced by Frank Capra; the Disney studio produced various animated inserts (maps). Know Your Enemy: Japan had three production numbers at Disney, probably because the animated inserts in this film included limited character animation. The third and the final film in this seriesKnow Your Ally: Britain, includes animation produced by Warner Bros. The entire series can be found at Archive.org.
U.S Army	Know Your Enemies	Here is Germany (53 min)	2 min	1945	This series was produced by Frank Capra; the Disney studio produced various animated inserts (maps) Here is Germany was originally planned in 1943 under another title (Know Your Enemy: Germany) but was canceled, then revised and completed in 1945 under its current title. The third and the final film in this series Know Your Ally: Britain, includes animation produced by Warner Bros. The entire series can be found at Archive.org.
U.S Army	—N/a	On to Tokyo (17 min)	7 min	1945	Disney only produced animated inserts (maps) for this film, the film can be found online: https://www.youtube.com/watch?v=mAlLdO2j7sk&ab_channel=PeriscopeFilm Not to be confused with Navy film of same name which can also be found online: https://www.youtube.com/watch?v=7SWUCQbw8og&ab_channel=EFPNetwork

=== Educational & Training films ===
Note: Walt Disney Productions is generally credited on these films, unless otherwise noted.

Client	Series title	Film title (total runtime)	Runtime (Disney total runtime)	Date	Notes
U.S Navy	Orientation Series	(unknown titles)	Unknown	Unknown	Richard Shale's book doesn't list any number of films with this series.

==== 1942 ====
Client	Series title	Film title (total runtime)	Runtime (Disney total runtime)	Date	Notes
U.S Navy	Aircraft Production Processes Series [Mooney Project]	Bending and Curving	37 of ? min	1942	Only animation Disney produced for this series, where animated diagrams to explain technology.
U.S Navy	Aircraft Production Processes Series [Mooney Project]	Blanking and Punching	24 of ? min	1942	Only animation Disney produced for this series, where animated diagrams to explain technology.
U.S Navy	Aircraft Production Processes Series [Mooney Project]	Forming Methods	40 of ? min	1942	Only animation Disney produced for this series, where animated diagrams to explain technology.
U.S Navy	Aircraft Production Processes Series [Mooney Project]	Aircraft Riveting	23 of ? min	1942	Only animation Disney produced for this series, where animated diagrams to explain technology.
U.S Navy	Aircraft Production Processes Series [Mooney Project]	Template Reproduction	18 of ? min	1942	Only animation Disney produced for this series, where animated diagrams to explain technology.
U.S Navy	Aircraft Production Processes Series [Mooney Project]	Heat Treating	12 of ? min	1942	Only animation Disney produced for this series, where animated diagrams to explain technology.
U.S Navy	Aerology Series	Ice Formation on Aircraft aka Icing Conditions	49 of ? min	1942	Few of the Aerology films can be found online: https://www.youtube.com/watch?v=1EdLKnGOpPA Aerology Series was remade in 1960s as Metrology series, by Audio Productions.
U.S Navy	Aerology Series	Fog and now Ceiling Clods	24 of ? min	1942	Few of the Aerology films can be found online: https://www.youtube.com/watch?v=o7aKVBWXFhY&t=10s&ab_channel=AIRBOYD Aerology Series was remade in 1960s as Metrology series, by Audio Productions.
U.S Army	U.S. Army Identification Series - WEFT (Wings, Engine, Fuselage, Tail)	B-25 Medium Bomber	unknown	1942	Disney produced 101 min of animation for U.S. Army Identification Series - WEFT (Wings, Engine, Fuselage, Tail). The animation is mostly limited diagrams explaining how to identify enemy air-planes but it is unknown how this animation is divided across the films. Small fragments of this series can be found on Walt Disney Treasures: On the Front Lines.
U.S Army	U.S. Army Identification Series - WEFT (Wings, Engine, Fuselage, Tail)	A-20B Douglas Medium Bomber	unknown	1942	Disney produced 101 min of animation for U.S. Army Identification Series - WEFT (Wings, Engine, Fuselage, Tail). The animation is mostly limited diagrams explaining how to identify enemy air-planes but it is unknown how this animation is divided across the films. Small fragments of this series can be found on Walt Disney Treasures: On the Front Lines.
U.S Army	U.S. Army Identification Series - WEFT (Wings, Engine, Fuselage, Tail)	B-17F Douglas Heavy Bomber	unknown	1942	Disney produced 101 min of animation for U.S. Army Identification Series - WEFT (Wings, Engine, Fuselage, Tail). The animation is mostly limited diagrams explaining how to identify enemy air-planes but it is unknown how this animation is divided across the films. Small fragments of this series can be found on Walt Disney Treasures: On the Front Lines.
U.S Army	U.S. Army Identification Series - WEFT (Wings, Engine, Fuselage, Tail)	B-24D Consolidated Heavy Bomber	unknown	1942	Disney produced 101 min of animation for U.S. Army Identification Series - WEFT (Wings, Engine, Fuselage, Tail). The animation is mostly limited diagrams explaining how to identify enemy air-planes but it is unknown how this animation is divided across the films. Small fragments of this series can be found on Walt Disney Treasures: On the Front Lines.
U.S Army	U.S. Army Identification Series - WEFT (Wings, Engine, Fuselage, Tail)	A-31 Northrop Light Bomber	unknown	1942	Disney produced 101 min of animation for U.S. Army Identification Series - WEFT (Wings, Engine, Fuselage, Tail). The animation is mostly limited diagrams explaining how to identify enemy air-planes but it is unknown how this animation is divided across the films. Small fragments of this series can be found on Walt Disney Treasures: On the Front Lines.
U.S Army	U.S. Army Identification Series - WEFT (Wings, Engine, Fuselage, Tail)	P-38E Lockheed Pursuit	unknown	1942	Disney produced 101 min of animation for U.S. Army Identification Series - WEFT (Wings, Engine, Fuselage, Tail). The animation is mostly limited diagrams explaining how to identify enemy air-planes but it is unknown how this animation is divided across the films. Small fragments of this series can be found on Walt Disney Treasures: On the Front Lines.
U.S Army	U.S. Army Identification Series - WEFT (Wings, Engine, Fuselage, Tail)	C-60A Lockheed Medium Transport	unknown	1942	Disney produced 101 min of animation for U.S. Army Identification Series - WEFT (Wings, Engine, Fuselage, Tail). The animation is mostly limited diagrams explaining how to identify enemy air-planes but it is unknown how this animation is divided across the films. Small fragments of this series can be found on Walt Disney Treasures: On the Front Lines.
U.S Army	U.S. Army Identification Series - WEFT (Wings, Engine, Fuselage, Tail)	C-54 Douglas Heavy Transport	unknown	1942	Disney produced 101 min of animation for U.S. Army Identification Series - WEFT (Wings, Engine, Fuselage, Tail). The animation is mostly limited diagrams explaining how to identify enemy air-planes but it is unknown how this animation is divided across the films. Small fragments of this series can be found on Walt Disney Treasures: On the Front Lines.
U.S Army	U.S. Army Identification Series - WEFT (Wings, Engine, Fuselage, Tail)	C-53 and C-47 Douglas Medium Transport	unknown	1942	Disney produced 101 min of animation for U.S. Army Identification Series - WEFT (Wings, Engine, Fuselage, Tail). The animation is mostly limited diagrams explaining how to identify enemy air-planes but it is unknown how this animation is divided across the films. Small fragments of this series can be found on Walt Disney Treasures: On the Front Lines.
U.S Army	U.S. Army Identification Series - WEFT (Wings, Engine, Fuselage, Tail)	A-28 Lockheed Light Bomber	unknown	1942	Disney produced 101 min of animation for U.S. Army Identification Series - WEFT (Wings, Engine, Fuselage, Tail). The animation is mostly limited diagrams explaining how to identify enemy air-planes but it is unknown how this animation is divided across the films. Small fragments of this series can be found on Walt Disney Treasures: On the Front Lines.
U.S Navy	U.S. Navy Identification - WEFT and Warships	PBY Catalina	unknown	1942	Disney produced 73 min of animation for U.S. Navy Identification - WEFT and Warships. The animation is mostly limited diagrams explaining how to identify enemy air-planes but it is unknown how this animation is divided across the films. Small fragments of this series can be found on Walt Disney Treasures: On the Front Lines.
U.S Navy	U.S. Navy Identification - WEFT and Warships	SBD Dauntless	unknown	1942	Disney produced 73 min of animation for U.S. Navy Identification - WEFT and Warships. The animation is mostly limited diagrams explaining how to identify enemy air-planes but it is unknown how this animation is divided across the films. Small fragments of this series can be found on Walt Disney Treasures: On the Front Lines.
U.S Navy	U.S. Navy Identification - WEFT and Warships	F4U Corsair	unknown	1942	Disney produced 73 min of animation for U.S. Navy Identification - WEFT and Warships. The animation is mostly limited diagrams explaining how to identify enemy air-planes but it is unknown how this animation is divided across the films. Small fragments of this series can be found on Walt Disney Treasures: On the Front Lines.
U.S Navy	U.S. Navy Identification - WEFT and Warships	F4F Wildcat	unknown	1942	Disney produced 73 min of animation for U.S. Navy Identification - WEFT and Warships. The animation is mostly limited diagrams explaining how to identify enemy air-planes but it is unknown how this animation is divided across the films. Small fragments of this series can be found on Walt Disney Treasures: On the Front Lines.
U.S Navy	U.S. Navy Identification - WEFT and Warships	PB2Y Coronado	unknown	1942	Disney produced 73 min of animation for U.S. Navy Identification - WEFT and Warships. The animation is mostly limited diagrams explaining how to identify enemy air-planes but it is unknown how this animation is divided across the films. Small fragments of this series can be found on Walt Disney Treasures: On the Front Lines.
U.S Navy	U.S. Navy Identification - WEFT and Warships	VBF Avenger	unknown	1942	Disney produced 73 min of animation for U.S. Navy Identification - WEFT and Warships. The animation is mostly limited diagrams explaining how to identify enemy air-planes but it is unknown how this animation is divided across the films. Small fragments of this series can be found on Walt Disney Treasures: On the Front Lines.
U.S Navy	U.S. Navy Identification - WEFT and Warships	F2A Brewster	unknown	1942	Disney produced 73 min of animation for U.S. Navy Identification - WEFT and Warships. The animation is mostly limited diagrams explaining how to identify enemy air-planes but it is unknown how this animation is divided across the films. Small fragments of this series can be found on Walt Disney Treasures: On the Front Lines.
U.S Navy	U.S. Navy Identification - WEFT and Warships	PBO Lockheed	unknown	1942	Disney produced 73 min of animation for U.S. Navy Identification - WEFT and Warships. The animation is mostly limited diagrams explaining how to identify enemy air-planes but it is unknown how this animation is divided across the films. Small fragments of this series can be found on Walt Disney Treasures: On the Front Lines.
U.S Navy	U.S. Navy Identification - WEFT and Warships	SB2A Brewster	unknown	1942	Disney produced 73 min of animation for U.S. Navy Identification - WEFT and Warships. The animation is mostly limited diagrams explaining how to identify enemy air-planes but it is unknown how this animation is divided across the films. Small fragments of this series can be found on Walt Disney Treasures: On the Front Lines.
U.S Navy	U.S. Navy Identification - WEFT and Warships	OS2U Kingfisher	unknown	1942	Disney produced 73 min of animation for U.S. Navy Identification - WEFT and Warships. The animation is mostly limited diagrams explaining how to identify enemies air-planes but it is unknown how this animation is divided across the films. Small fragments of this series can be found on Walt Disney Treasures: On the Front Lines.
U.S Navy	U.S. Navy Identification - WEFT and Warships	SB2U Vindicator	unknown	1942	Disney produced 73 min of animation for U.S. Navy Identification - WEFT and Warships. The animation is mostly limited diagrams explaining how to identify enemy air-planes but it is unknown how this animation is divided across the films. Small fragments of this series can be found on Walt Disney Treasures: On the Front Lines.
U.S Navy	U.S. Navy Identification - WEFT and Warships	(unknown title (part 12))	unknown	1942	Disney produced 73 min of animation for U.S. Navy Identification - WEFT and Warships. The animation is mostly limited diagrams explaining how to identify enemy air-planes but it is unknown how this animation is divided across the films. Small fragments of this series can be found on Walt Disney Treasures: On the Front Lines.
U.S Navy	U.S. Navy Identification - WEFT and Warships	(unknown title (part 13))	unknown	1942	Disney produced 73 min of animation for U.S. Navy Identification - WEFT and Warships. The animation is mostly limited diagrams explaining how to identify enemy air-planes but it is unknown how this animation is divided across the films. Small fragments of this series can be found on Walt Disney Treasures: On the Front Lines.
U.S Navy	Rules of the Nautical Road	The Halifax Incident	6 min	1942	Limited animation produced by Disney to explain various incidents at sea and rule changes. The first film in the series "The Halifax Incident" was produced in its entirety in this fashion, but its unclear at this moment if the rest of the films were all produced in animation or if they included live-action. The list given in Shale's book is incorrect. Small fragments of first film in series can be found on Walt Disney Treasures: On the Front Lines.
U.S Navy	Rules of the Nautical Road	Introduction. Parts 1 and 2	22 min	1942	Limited animation produced by Disney to explain various incidents at sea and rule changes. Unlear at this moment if any of the Rules of Nautical Road films included any live-action footage.
U.S Navy	Rules of the Nautical Road	Lights, Running and Anchor	17 min	1942	Limited animation produced by Disney to explain various incidents at sea and rule changes. Unlear at this moment if any of the Rules of Nautical Road films included any live-action footage.
U.S Navy	Rules of the Nautical Road	City of Rome Incident	5 min	1942	Limited animation produced by Disney to explain various incidents at sea and rule changes. Unlear at this moment if any of the Rules of Nautical Road films included any live-action footage.
U.S. Navy	—N/a	Aircraft Carrier Landing Signals	15 of ? min	1942	Its unknown what type of animation Disney produced for this film, but is probably animated diagrams.
U.S. Navy	—N/a	Aircraft Carrier Mat Approaches and Landings	14 of ? min	1942	Its unknown what type of animation Disney produced for this film, but is probably animated diagrams.
U.S. Navy	—N/a	Protection against Chemical Warfare	9 of 16 min	1942	Disney mostly produced diagrams of various situations to gas inhalation and limited character animation the short can be found on Youtube: https://www.youtube.com/watch?v=Zs4CNKr6kvU MN-324A-D
U.S. Navy	—N/a	Approaches and Landings	17 of ? min	1942	Its unknown what type of animation Disney produced for this film, but is probably animated diagrams.

==== 1943 ====
Client	Series title	Film title (total runtime)	Runtime (Disney total runtime)	Date	Notes
U.S Navy	Aircraft Production Processes Series [Mooney Project]	Mock-Up and Tooling [Aircraft Tooling]	19 of ? min	1943	Only animation Disney produced for this series, where animated diagrams help to explain technology.
U.S Navy	Aircraft Production Processes Series [Mooney Project]	Lofting and Layouts	30 of ? min	1943	Only animation Disney produced for this series, where animated diagrams help to explain technology.
U.S Navy	Aerology Series	Air Masses and Fronts	25 of ? min	1943	Few of the Aerology films can be found online: https://www.youtube.com/watch?v=1EdLKnGOpPA and https://www.youtube.com/watch?v=o7aKVBWXFhY&t=10s&ab_channel=AIRBOYD Aerology Series was remade in 1960s as Metrology series, by Audio Productions.
U.S Navy	Aerology Series	The Cold Front	19 of ? min	1943	Aerology Series was remade in 1960s as Metrology series, by Audio Productions.
U.S Navy	Aerology Series	The Occluded Front	30 of ? min	1943	Aerology Series was remade in 1960s as Metrology series, by Audio Productions.
U.S Navy	Aerology Series	Thunderstorms	39 of ? min	1943	Aerology Series was remade in 1960s as Metrology series, by Audio Productions.
U.S Navy	Aerology Series	Thunderstorms	20 of ? min	1943	Aerology Series was remade in 1960s as Metrology series, by Audio Productions.
U.S Navy	Aerology Series	V.T.B. Pilot Training	20 of ? min	1943	Aerology Series was remade in 1960s as Metrology series, by Audio Productions.
U.S Navy	Aerology Series	The Warm Front	20 of ? min	1943	Aerology Series was remade in 1960s as Metrology series, by Audio Productions.
U.S Navy	Aerology Series	Flying the Weather Map, Pt. 1 & 2: The Equatorial Front	25 of ? min	1943	Aerology Series was remade in 1960s as Metrology series, by Audio Productions.
U.S Navy	Aerology Series	Flying the Weather Map, Pt. 3 & 4: The Howgozit Chart	? of 14 min	1943	Aerology Series was remade in 1960s as Metrology series, by Audio Productions.
U.S Navy	Fixed Gunnery and Fighter Tactics [Jacksonville Project]	Use of the Illuminated in Gunnery Sight	Unknown	1943	Only animation Disney produced for this series is animated diagrams, that explain various flight and fighting tactics. The total combined runtime of disney animation produced for Fixed Gunnery and Fighter Tactics [Jacksonville Project] was 78 min). The series is also known as "Fighter Pilot ace Thach's" series.
U.S Navy	Fixed Gunnery and Fighter Tactics [Jacksonville Project]	Fundamental Fixed Gunnery Approaches	unknown	1943	Only animation Disney produced for this series is animated diagrams, that explain various flight and fighting tactics. The series is also known as "Fighter Pilot ace Thach's" series.
U.S Navy	Fixed Gunnery and Fighter Tactics [Jacksonville Project]	Group Tactics Against Enemies Bombers	unknown	1943	Only animation Disney produced for this series is animated diagrams, that explain various flight and fighting tactics. The series is also known as "Fighter Pilot ace Thach's" series.
U.S Navy	Fixed Gunnery and Fighter Tactics [Jacksonville Project]	Attack Against Bomber Formations	unknown	1943	Only animation Disney produced for this series is animated diagrams, that explain various flight and fighting tactics. The series is also known as "Fighter Pilot ace Thach's" series.
U.S Navy	Fixed Gunnery and Fighter Tactics [Jacksonville Project]	Offensive Tactics against Enemy Fighters	unknown	1943	Only animation Disney produced for this series is animated diagrams, that explain various flight and fighting tactics. The series is also known as "Fighter Pilot ace Thach's" series.
U.S Navy	Fixed Gunnery and Fighter Tactics [Jacksonville Project]	Defensive Tactics against Enemy Fighters	unknown	1943	Only animation Disney produced for this series is animated diagrams, that explain various flight and fighting tactics. The series is also known as "Fighter Pilot ace Thach's" series.
U.S Navy	Fixed Gunnery and Fighter Tactics [Jacksonville Project]	Escort Doctrine aka Fighter Escort	unknown	1943	Only animation Disney produced for this series is animated diagrams, that explain various flight and fighting tactics. The series is also known as "Fighter Pilot ace Thach's" series.
U.S Navy	Fixed Gunnery and Fighter Tactics [Jacksonville Project]	Combat Air Patrol	unknown	1943	Only animation Disney produced for this series is animated diagrams, that explain various flight and fighting tactics. The series is also known as "Fighter Pilot ace Thach's" series.
U.S Navy	Fixed Gunnery and Fighter Tactics [Jacksonville Project]	Conclusion and Summary	unknown	1943	Only animation Disney produced for this series is animated diagrams, that explain various flight and fighting tactics. The series is also known as "Fighter Pilot ace Thach's" series.
U.S Navy	US Navy Identification 3-Point System Warships	Cruiser (introductory)	unknown	1943	Disney produced 135 min of animation for US Navy Identification 3-Point System Warships. The animation is mostly limited diagrams explaining how to identify enemy air-planes but it is unknown how this animation is divided across the films. Small fragments of this series can be found on Walt Disney Treasures: On the Front Lines.
U.S Navy	US Navy Identification 3-Point System Warships	Wichita Class	unknown	1943	Disney produced 135 min of animation for US Navy Identification 3-Point System Warships. The animation is mostly limited diagrams explaining how to identify enemy air-planes but it is unknown how this animation is divided across the films. Small fragments of this series can be found on Walt Disney Treasures: On the Front Lines.
U.S Navy	US Navy Identification 3-Point System Warships	Astoria Class	unknown	1943	Disney produced 135 min of animation for US Navy Identification 3-Point System Warships. The animation is mostly limited diagrams explaining how to identify enemy air-planes but it is unknown how this animation is divided across the films. Small fragments of this series can be found on Walt Disney Treasures: On the Front Lines.
U.S Navy	US Navy Identification 3-Point System Warships	Portland Class	unknown	1943	Disney produced 135 min of animation for US Navy Identification 3-Point System Warships. The animation is mostly limited diagrams explaining how to identify enemy air-planes but it is unknown how this animation is divided across the films. Small fragments of this series can be found on Walt Disney Treasures: On the Front Lines.
U.S Navy	US Navy Identification 3-Point System Warships	Northampton Class	unknown	1943	Disney produced 135 min of animation for US Navy Identification 3-Point System Warships. The animation is mostly limited diagrams explaining how to identify enemy air-planes but it is unknown how this animation is divided across the films. Small fragments of this series can be found on Walt Disney Treasures: On the Front Lines.
U.S Navy	US Navy Identification 3-Point System Warships	Pensaeola Class	unknown	1943	Disney produced 135 min of animation for US Navy Identification 3-Point System Warships. The animation is mostly limited diagrams explaining how to identify enemy air-planes but it is unknown how this animation is divided across the films. Small fragments of this series can be found on Walt Disney Treasures: On the Front Lines.
U.S Navy	US Navy Identification 3-Point System Warships	Brooklyn Class	unknown	1943	Disney produced 135 min of animation for US Navy Identification 3-Point System Warships. The animation is mostly limited diagrams explaining how to identify enemy air-planes but it is unknown how this animation is divided across the films. Small fragments of this series can be found on Walt Disney Treasures: On the Front Lines.
U.S Navy	US Navy Identification 3-Point System Warships	Ohama Class	unknown	1943	Disney produced 135 min of animation for US Navy Identification 3-Point System Warships. The animation is mostly limited diagrams explaining how to identify enemy air-planes but it is unknown how this animation is divided across the films. Small fragments of this series can be found on Walt Disney Treasures: On the Front Lines.
U.S Navy	US Navy Identification 3-Point System Warships	Carriers (introductory)	unknown	1943	Disney produced 135 min of animation for US Navy Identification 3-Point System Warships. The animation is mostly limited diagrams explaining how to identify enemy air-planes but it is unknown how this animation is divided across the films. Small fragments of this series can be found on Walt Disney Treasures: On the Front Lines.
U.S Navy	US Navy Identification 3-Point System Warships	Yorktown Class	unknown	1943	Disney produced 135 min of animation for US Navy Identification 3-Point System Warships. The animation is mostly limited diagrams explaining how to identify enemy air-planes but it is unknown how this animation is divided across the films. Small fragments of this series can be found on Walt Disney Treasures: On the Front Lines.
U.S Navy	US Navy Identification 3-Point System Warships	Wasp Class	unknown	1943	Disney produced 135 min of animation for US Navy Identification 3-Point System Warships. The animation is mostly limited diagrams explaining how to identify enemy air-planes but it is unknown how this animation is divided across the films. Small fragments of this series can be found on Walt Disney Treasures: On the Front Lines.
U.S Navy	US Navy Identification 3-Point System Warships	Ranger Class	unknown	1943	Disney produced 135 min of animation for US Navy Identification 3-Point System Warships. The animation is mostly limited diagrams explaining how to identify enemy air-planes but it is unknown how this animation is divided across the films. Small fragments of this series can be found on Walt Disney Treasures: On the Front Lines.
U.S Navy	US Navy Identification 3-Point System Warships	Long Island Class	unknown	1943	Disney produced 135 min of animation for US Navy Identification 3-Point System Warships. The animation is mostly limited diagrams explaining how to identify enemy air-planes but it is unknown how this animation is divided across the films. Small fragments of this series can be found on Walt Disney Treasures: On the Front Lines.
U.S Navy	US Navy Identification 3-Point System Warships	Lexington Class	unknown	1943	Disney produced 135 min of animation for US Navy Identification 3-Point System Warships. The animation is mostly limited diagrams explaining how to identify enemy air-planes but it is unknown how this animation is divided across the films. Small fragments of this series can be found on Walt Disney Treasures: On the Front Lines.
U.S Navy	US Navy Identification 3-Point System Warships	Destroyers (introductory)	unknown	1943	Disney produced 135 min of animation for US Navy Identification 3-Point System Warships. The animation is mostly limited diagrams explaining how to identify enemy air-planes but it is unknown how this animation is divided across the films. Small fragments of this series can be found on Walt Disney Treasures: On the Front Lines.
U.S Navy	US Navy Identification 3-Point System Warships	Warrington	unknown	1943	Disney produced 135 min of animation for US Navy Identification 3-Point System Warships. The animation is mostly limited diagrams explaining how to identify enemy air-planes but it is unknown how this animation is divided across the films. Small fragments of this series can be found on Walt Disney Treasures: On the Front Lines.
U.S Navy	US Navy Identification 3-Point System Warships	Porter	unknown	1943	Disney produced 135 min of animation for US Navy Identification 3-Point System Warships. The animation is mostly limited diagrams explaining how to identify enemy air-planes but it is unknown how this animation is divided across the films. Small fragments of this series can be found on Walt Disney Treasures: On the Front Lines.
U.S Navy	US Navy Identification 3-Point System Warships	Mayo	unknown	1943	Disney produced 135 min of animation for US Navy Identification 3-Point System Warships. The animation is mostly limited diagrams explaining how to identify enemy air-planes but it is unknown how this animation is divided across the films. Small fragments of this series can be found on Walt Disney Treasures: On the Front Lines.
U.S Navy	US Navy Identification 3-Point System Warships	Sims	unknown	1943	Disney produced 135 min of animation for US Navy Identification 3-Point System Warships. The animation is mostly limited diagrams explaining how to identify enemy air-planes but it is unknown how this animation is divided across the films. Small fragments of this series can be found on Walt Disney Treasures: On the Front Lines.
U.S Navy	US Navy Identification 3-Point System Warships	Benham	unknown	1943	Disney produced 135 min of animation for US Navy Identification 3-Point System Warships. The animation is mostly limited diagrams explaining how to identify enemy air-planes but it is unknown how this animation is divided across the films. Small fragments of this series can be found on Walt Disney Treasures: On the Front Lines.
U.S Navy	US Navy Identification 3-Point System Warships	Blue	unknown	1943	Disney produced 135 min of animation for US Navy Identification 3-Point System Warships. The animation is mostly limited diagrams explaining how to identify enemy air-planes but it is unknown how this animation is divided across the films. Small fragments of this series can be found on Walt Disney Treasures: On the Front Lines.
U.S Navy	US Navy Identification 3-Point System Warships	Fanning	unknown	1943	Disney produced 135 min of animation for US Navy Identification 3-Point System Warships. The animation is mostly limited diagrams explaining how to identify enemy air-planes but it is unknown how this animation is divided across the films. Small fragments of this series can be found on Walt Disney Treasures: On the Front Lines.
U.S Navy	US Navy Identification 3-Point System Warships	McCall	unknown	1943	Disney produced 135 min of animation for US Navy Identification 3-Point System Warships. The animation is mostly limited diagrams explaining how to identify enemy air-planes but it is unknown how this animation is divided across the films. Small fragments of this series can be found on Walt Disney Treasures: On the Front Lines.
U.S Navy	US Navy Identification 3-Point System Warships	Farragut	unknown	1943	Disney produced 135 min of animation for US Navy Identification 3-Point System Warships. The animation is mostly limited diagrams explaining how to identify enemy air-planes but it is unknown how this animation is divided across the films. Small fragments of this series can be found on Walt Disney Treasures: On the Front Lines.
U.S Navy	US Navy Identification 3-Point System Warships	Four-Stacker	unknown	1943	Disney produced 135 min of animation for US Navy Identification 3-Point System Warships. The animation is mostly limited diagrams explaining how to identify enemy air-planes but it is unknown how this animation is divided across the films. Small fragments of this series can be found on Walt Disney Treasures: On the Front Lines.
U.S Navy	US Navy Identification 3-Point System Warships	Hutchins Class	unknown	1943	Disney produced 135 min of animation for US Navy Identification 3-Point System Warships. The animation is mostly limited diagrams explaining how to identify enemy air-planes but it is unknown how this animation is divided across the films. Small fragments of this series can be found on Walt Disney Treasures: On the Front Lines.
U.S Navy	US Navy Identification 3-Point System Warships	Fletcher Class	unknown	1943	Disney produced 135 min of animation for US Navy Identification 3-Point System Warships. The animation is mostly limited diagrams explaining how to identify enemy air-planes but it is unknown how this animation is divided across the films. Small fragments of this series can be found on Walt Disney Treasures: On the Front Lines.
U.S Navy	US Navy Identification 3-Point System Warships	Mahan Class	unknown	1943	Disney produced 135 min of animation for US Navy Identification 3-Point System Warships. The animation is mostly limited diagrams explaining how to identify enemy air-planes but it is unknown how this animation is divided across the films. Small fragments of this series can be found on Walt Disney Treasures: On the Front Lines.
U.S Navy	US Navy Identification 3-Point System Warships	Atlanta Class Carrier	unknown	1943	Disney produced 135 min of animation for US Navy Identification 3-Point System Warships. The animation is mostly limited diagrams explaining how to identify enemy air-planes but it is unknown how this animation is divided across the films. Small fragments of this series can be found on Walt Disney Treasures: On the Front Lines.
U.S Navy	US Navy Identification 3-Point System Warships	Cleveland Class	unknown	1943	Disney produced 135 min of animation for US Navy Identification 3-Point System Warships. The animation is mostly limited diagrams explaining how to identify enemy air-planes but it is unknown how this animation is divided across the films. Small fragments of this series can be found on Walt Disney Treasures: On the Front Lines.
U.S Navy	US Navy Identification 3-Point System Warships	Saratoga Class Carrier	unknown	1943	Disney produced 135 min of animation for US Navy Identification 3-Point System Warships. The animation is mostly limited diagrams explaining how to identify enemy air-planes but it is unknown how this animation is divided across the films. Small fragments of this series can be found on Walt Disney Treasures: On the Front Lines.
U.S Navy	US Navy Identification 3-Point System Warships	Eric Class Auxiliary	unknown	1943	Disney produced 135 min of animation for US Navy Identification 3-Point System Warships. The animation is mostly limited diagrams explaining how to identify enemy air-planes but it is unknown how this animation is divided across the films. Small fragments of this series can be found on Walt Disney Treasures: On the Front Lines.
U.S Navy	US Navy Identification 3-Point System Warships	Terror Class	unknown	1943	Disney produced 135 min of animation for US Navy Identification 3-Point System Warships. The animation is mostly limited diagrams explaining how to identify enemy air-planes but it is unknown how this animation is divided across the films. Small fragments of this series can be found on Walt Disney Treasures: On the Front Lines.
U.S Navy	US Navy Identification 3-Point System Warships	Curtis Class	unknown	1943	Disney produced 135 min of animation for US Navy Identification 3-Point System Warships. The animation is mostly limited diagrams explaining how to identify enemy air-planes but it is unknown how this animation is divided across the films. Small fragments of this series can be found on Walt Disney Treasures: On the Front Lines.
U.S Navy	US Navy Identification 3-Point System Warships	Prairie Fulton Class	unknown	1943	Disney produced 135 min of animation for US Navy Identification 3-Point System Warships. The animation is mostly limited diagrams explaining how to identify enemy air-planes but it is unknown how this animation is divided across the films. Small fragments of this series can be found on Walt Disney Treasures: On the Front Lines.
U.S Navy	US Navy Identification 3-Point System Warships	Holland Class	unknown	1943	Disney produced 135 min of animation for US Navy Identification 3-Point System Warships. The animation is mostly limited diagrams explaining how to identify enemy air-planes but it is unknown how this animation is divided across the films. Small fragments of this series can be found on Walt Disney Treasures: On the Front Lines.
U.S Navy	US Navy Identification 3-Point System Warships	Holland Class	unknown	1943	Disney produced 135 min of animation for US Navy Identification 3-Point System Warships. The animation is mostly limited diagrams explaining how to identify enemy air-planes but it is unknown how this animation is divided across the films. Small fragments of this series can be found on Walt Disney Treasures: On the Front Lines.
U.S Navy	US Navy Identification 3-Point System Warships	(unknown 38-film)	unknown	1943	Disney produced 135 min of animation for US Navy Identification 3-Point System Warships. The animation is mostly limited diagrams explaining how to identify enemy air-planes but it is unknown how this animation is divided across the films. Small fragments of this series can be found on Walt Disney Treasures: On the Front Lines. Richard Shale's book includes only 37 films while other sources include 38 films.
Beech Aircraft Corp., U.S. Army	Beechcraft Maintenance and Repair	Service, Inspection and Maintenance of the AT-11: Landing Gear	unknown	1943	Disney produced 359 min of animation for Beechcraft Maintenance and Repair. The animation is mostly limited diagrams explaining how various air-plane mechanisms can be repaired but it is unknown how this animation is divided across the films.
Beech Aircraft Corp., U.S. Army	Beechcraft Maintenance and Repair	Service, Inspection and Maintenance of the AT-11: Wheels and Brakes	unknown	1943	Disney produced 359 min of animation for Beechcraft Maintenance and Repair. The animation is mostly limited diagrams explaining how various air-plane mechanisms can be repaired but it is unknown how this animation is divided across the films.
Beech Aircraft Corp., U.S. Army	Beechcraft Maintenance and Repair	Service, Inspection and Maintenance of the AT-11: Flight and Controls	unknown	1943	Disney produced 359 min of animation for Beechcraft Maintenance and Repair. The animation is mostly limited diagrams explaining how various air-plane mechanisms can be repaired but it is unknown how this animation is divided across the films.
Beech Aircraft Corp., U.S. Army	Beechcraft Maintenance and Repair	Service, Inspection and Maintenance of the AT-11: General Instructions	unknown	1943	Disney produced 359 min of animation for Beechcraft Maintenance and Repair. The animation is mostly limited diagrams explaining how various air-plane mechanisms can be repaired but it is unknown how this animation is divided across the films.
Beech Aircraft Corp., U.S. Army	Beechcraft Maintenance and Repair	Service, Inspection and Maintenance of the AT-11: Engine Changes	unknown	1943	Disney produced 359 min of animation for Beechcraft Maintenance and Repair. The animation is mostly limited diagrams explaining how various air-plane mechanisms can be repaired but it is unknown how this animation is divided across the films.
Beech Aircraft Corp., U.S. Army	Beechcraft Maintenance and Repair	Service, Inspection and Maintenance of the AT-10: Landing Gear	unknown	1943	Disney produced 359 min of animation for Beechcraft Maintenance and Repair. The animation is mostly limited diagrams explaining how various air-plane mechanisms can be repaired but it is unknown how this animation is divided across the films.
Beech Aircraft Corp., U.S. Army	Beechcraft Maintenance and Repair	Service, Inspection and Maintenance of the AT-10: Wheels and Brakes	unknown	1943	Disney produced 359 min of animation for Beechcraft Maintenance and Repair. The animation is mostly limited diagrams explaining how various air-plane mechanisms can be repaired but it is unknown how this animation is divided across the films.
Beech Aircraft Corp., U.S. Army	Beechcraft Maintenance and Repair	Service, Inspection and Maintenance of the AT-10: Flight and Controls	unknown	1943	Disney produced 359 min of animation for Beechcraft Maintenance and Repair. The animation is mostly limited diagrams explaining how various air-plane mechanisms can be repaired but it is unknown how this animation is divided across the films.
Beech Aircraft Corp., U.S. Army	Beechcraft Maintenance and Repair	Service, Inspection and Maintenance of the AT-10: General Instructions	unknown	1943	Disney produced 359 min of animation for Beechcraft Maintenance and Repair. The animation is mostly limited diagrams explaining how various air-plane mechanisms can be repaired but it is unknown how this animation is divided across the films.
Beech Aircraft Corp., U.S. Army	Beechcraft Maintenance and Repair	Service, Inspection and Maintenance of the AT-10: Engine Changes	unknown	1943	Disney produced 359 min of animation for Beechcraft Maintenance and Repair. The animation is mostly limited diagrams explaining how various air-plane mechanisms can be repaired but it is unknown how this animation is divided across the films.
Beech Aircraft Corp., U.S. Army	Beechcraft Maintenance and Repair	Service, Inspection and Maintenance of the AT-7: Wheels and Brakes	unknown	1943	Disney produced 359 min of animation for Beechcraft Maintenance and Repair. The animation is mostly limited diagrams explaining how various air-plane mechanisms can be repaired but it is unknown how this animation is divided across the films.
Beech Aircraft Corp., U.S. Army	Beechcraft Maintenance and Repair	Service, Inspection and Maintenance of the AT-7: Flight and Controls	unknown	1943	Disney produced 359 min of animation for Beechcraft Maintenance and Repair. The animation is mostly limited diagrams explaining how various air-plane mechanisms can be repaired but it is unknown how this animation is divided across the films.
Beech Aircraft Corp., U.S. Army	Beechcraft Maintenance and Repair	Service, Inspection and Maintenance of the AT-7: General Instructions	unknown	1943	Disney produced 359 min of animation for Beechcraft Maintenance and Repair. The animation is mostly limited diagrams explaining how various air-plane mechanisms can be repaired but it is unknown how this animation is divided across the films.
Beech Aircraft Corp., U.S. Army	Beechcraft Maintenance and Repair	Service, Inspection and Maintenance of the AT-7: Engine Changes	unknown	1943	Disney produced 359 min of animation for Beechcraft Maintenance and Repair. The animation is mostly limited diagrams explaining how various air-plane mechanisms can be repaired but it is unknown how this animation is divided across the films.
Beech Aircraft Corp., U.S. Army	Aircraft Wood Repair [Repairs of Wood Aircraft]	Small Scarf Patch and Doubler Patch	26 min	1943	Small fragments of this series can be found on Walt Disney Treasures: On the Front Lines. The first two Aircraft Wood Repair films can be found complete online https://www.youtube.com/watch?v=D3LjAdWlxMQ&ab_channel=RetroProto
Beech Aircraft Corp., U.S. Army	Aircraft Wood Repair [Repairs of Wood Aircraft]	Stiffener Patch	18 min	1943	Disney produced 359 min of animation for US Navy Identification 3-Point System Warships. The animation is mostly limited diagrams explaining how various air-plane mechanisms can be repaired. Small fragments of this series can be found on Walt Disney Treasures: On the Front Lines. The first two Air Crat Wood Repair films can be found online https://www.youtube.com/watch?v=D3LjAdWlxMQ&ab_channel=RetroProto |-
Beech Aircraft Corp., U.S. Army	Aircraft Wood Repair [Repairs of Wood Aircraft]	Leading Edge Repairs	25 min	1943	Disney produced 359 min of animation for US Navy Identification 3-Point System Warships. The animation is mostly limited diagrams explaining how various air-plane mechanisms can be repaired. Small fragments of this series can be found on Walt Disney Treasures: On the Front Lines. The last two Aircraft Wood Repair films can be found online: https://www.youtube.com/watch?v=FoDXHUBF5PQ&t=2419s&ab_channel=RetroProto
Beech Aircraft Corp., U.S. Army	Aircraft Wood Repair [Repairs of Wood Aircraft]	Bulkhead Repair	18 min.	1943	Disney produced 359 min of animation for US Navy Identification 3-Point System Warships. The animation is mostly limited diagrams explaining how various air-plane mechanisms can be repaired. Small fragments of this series can be found on Walt Disney Treasures: On the Front Lines. The first two Air Crat Wood Repair films can be found online: https://www.youtube.com/watch?v=FoDXHUBF5PQ&t=2419s&ab_channel=RetroProto
U.S Army	Minneapolis Honeywell Project	Theory of the C-1 Auto Pilot part 1: Basic Principles	19 min	1943	Disney produced 121 min of animation for Minneapolis Honeywell Project to explain C-1 Auto pilot. The first film also included animation sequence to entertain, to lighten the mood before getting into the heavy subject. Its unclear at this point if most other films in this series includes similar sequences. Small fragments of this series can be found on Walt Disney Treasures: On the Front Lines. The complete film can be found on online: https://www.youtube.com/watch?v=Wx-wl40AOAc&ab_channel=JeffieBraverman
U.S Army	Minneapolis Honeywell Project	Theory of the C-1 Auto Pilot part 2: Control System	unknown	1943	Disney produced 121 min of animation for Minneapolis Honeywell Project to explain C-1 Auto pilot. This film is probably similar to the first theory film in the series.
U.S Army	Minneapolis Honeywell Project	Operation of the C-1 Auto Pilot part 1: Setting up for Fight	unknown	1943	Disney produced 121 min of animation for Minneapolis Honeywell Project to explain C-1 Auto pilot. It is probably similar to the second operation film in the series.
U.S Army	Minneapolis Honeywell Project	Operation of the C-1 Auto Pilot part 2: Setting up for Bombing	unknown	1943	Disney produced 121 min of animation for the Minneapolis Honeywell Project to explain the C-1 Autopilot. The first film also included an animation sequence to entertain and lighten the mood before getting into the heavy subject. It's unclear if most other films in this series include similar sequences. The film can be found online: https://www.youtube.com/watch?v=Ofp49oBt60Q&t=149s&ab_channel=footagefarm
U.S Army	Minneapolis Honeywell Project	Maintenance and servicing of the C-1 Auto Pilot part one: Servo Motor	unknown	1943	Disney produced 121 min of animation for Minneapolis Honeywell Project to explain C-1 Auto pilot from maintenance and service stand point. This film is probably similar to the fifth film in the series.
U.S Army	Minneapolis Honeywell Project	Maintenance and servicing of the C-1 Auto Pilot part two: Flight Gyro	unknown	1943	Disney produced 121 min of animation for Minneapolis Honeywell Project to explain C-1 Auto pilot, from maintenance and service stand point. This film is probably similar to the fifth film in the series.
U.S Army	Minneapolis Honeywell Project	Maintenance and servicing of the C-1 Auto Pilot part three: The Amplifier	unknown	1943	Disney produced 121 min of animation for Minneapolis Honeywell Project to explain C-1 Auto pilot, from maintenance and service stand point. This film is probably similar to the fifth film in the series.
U.S Army	Minneapolis Honeywell Project	Maintenance and servicing of the C-1 Auto Pilot part four: The Directional Stabilizer	unknown	1943	Disney produced 121 min of animation for Minneapolis Honeywell Project to explain C-1 Auto pilot, from maintenance and service stand point. This film is probably similar to the fifth film in the series.
U.S Army	Minneapolis Honeywell Project	Maintenance and servicing of the C-1 Auto Pilot part five: Ground Check and Trouble Shooting	unknown	1943	Disney produced 121 min of animation for Minneapolis Honeywell Project to explain C-1 Auto pilot from maintenance and service stand point. This film includes dry technical information. The complete five film can be found online: https://www.youtube.com/watch?v=ALkQdOhwvdY&t=783s&ab_channel=SanDiegoAirandSpaceMuseumArchives
U.S Army	Minneapolis Honeywell Project	Electronic Control system of the C-1 Auto Pilot part one: Basic Electricity as Applied to Electronic Control system	unknown	1943	Disney produced 121 min of animation for Minneapolis Honeywell Project to explain C-1 Auto pilot. This film is probably similar to the maintenance and service films.
U.S Army	Minneapolis Honeywell Project	Electronic Control system of the C-1 Auto Pilot part two: Basic Electronics as Applied to Electronic Control system	unknown	1943	Disney produced 121 min of animation for Minneapolis Honeywell Project to explain C-1 Auto pilot. This film is probably similar to the maintenance and service films.
U.S Navy	Rules of the Nautical Road	Towing Lights	7 min	1943	Limited animation produced by Disney to explain various incidents at sea and rule changes. Unlear at this moment if any of the Rules of Nautical Road films included any live-action footage.
U.S Navy	Rules of the Nautical Road	Lights: Vessels Being Towed	10 min	1943	Limited animation produced by Disney to explain various incidents at sea and rule changes. Unlear at this moment if any of the Rules of Nautical Road films included any live-action footage.
U.S Navy	Rules of the Nautical Road	Special Lights	28 min	1943	Limited animation produced by Disney to explain various incidents at sea and rule changes. Unlear at this moment if any of the Rules of Nautical Road films included any live-action footage.
U.S Navy	Rules of the Nautical Road	Quiz on Lights and Day Signals	14 min	1943	Limited animation produced by Disney to explain various incidents at sea and rule changes. Unlear at this moment if any of the Rules of Nautical Road films included any live-action footage.
U.S Navy	Rules of the Nautical Road	Visual Day Signals	13 min	1943	Limited animation produced by Disney to explain various incidents at sea and rule changes. Unlear at this moment if any of the Rules of Nautical Road films included any live-action footage.
U.S Navy	Rules of the Nautical Road	Whistle Signals for Approaching	17 min	1943	Limited animation produced by Disney to explain various incidents at sea and rule changes. Unlear at this moment if any of the Rules of Nautical Road films included any live-action footage.
U.S Navy	Rules of the Nautical Road	Meeting Steam Vessels	17 min	1943	Limited animation produced by Disney to explain various incidents at sea and rule changes. Unlear at this moment if any of the Rules of Nautical Road films included any live-action footage.
U.S Navy	Rules of the Nautical Road	The McCormick-Maru Incident (aka The McCormick-Yoshido Maru Incident)	4 min	1943	Limited animation produced by Disney to explain various incidents at sea and rule changes. Unlear at this moment if any of the Rules of Nautical Road films included any live-action footage.
U.S Navy	Rules of the Nautical Road	Meeting at Night	20 min	1943	Limited animation produced by Disney to explain various incidents at sea and rule changes. Unlear at this moment if any of the Rules of Nautical Road films included any live-action footage.
U.S Navy	Rules of the Nautical Road	Overtaking Situation	15 min	1943	Limited animation produced by Disney to explain various incidents at sea and rule changes. Unlear at this moment if any of the Rules of Nautical Road films included any live-action footage.
U.S Navy	Rules of the Nautical Road	The Varanger-Dora Weems Incident	5 min	1943	Limited animation produced by Disney to explain various incidents at sea and rule changes. Unlear at this moment if any of the Rules of Nautical Road films included any live-action footage.
U.S Navy	Rules of the Nautical Road	The Taurus-Gulf Trade Incident	3 min	1943	Limited animation produced by Disney to explain various incidents at sea and rule changes. Unlear at this moment if any of the Rules of Nautical Road films included any live-action footage.
U.S Navy	Rules of the Nautical Road	Overtaking at Night	15 min	1943	Limited animation produced by Disney to explain various incidents at sea and rule changes. Unlear at this moment if any of the Rules of Nautical Road films included any live-action footage.
U.S Navy	Rules of the Nautical Road	Crossing Steam Vessels	15 min	1943	Limited animation produced by Disney to explain various incidents at sea and rule changes. Unlear at this moment if any of the Rules of Nautical Road films included any live-action footage.
U.S Navy	Rules of the Nautical Road	The El Isleo-Eastern Glade Incident	5 min	1943	Limited animation produced by Disney to explain various incidents at sea and rule changes. Unlear at this moment if any of the Rules of Nautical Road films included any live-action footage.
U.S Navy	Rules of the Nautical Road	The Svea-Newport Incident	5 min	1943	Limited animation produced by Disney to explain various incidents at sea and rule changes. Unlear at this moment if any of the Rules of Nautical Road films included any live-action footage.
U.S Navy	Rules of the Nautical Road	Crossing at Night	19 min	1943	Limited animation produced by Disney to explain various incidents at sea and rule changes. Unlear at this moment if any of the Rules of Nautical Road films included any live-action footage.
U.S Navy	Rules of the Nautical Road	Rules in Fog. Parts 1 and 2	16 min	1943	Limited animation produced by Disney to explain various incidents at sea and rule changes. Unlear at this moment if any of the Rules of Nautical Road films included any live-action footage.
U.S Navy	Rules of the Nautical Road	Empress of Ireland-Storstad Incident	5 min	1943	Limited animation produced by Disney to explain various incidents at sea and rule changes. Unlear at this moment if any of the Rules of Nautical Road films included any live-action footage.
U.S Navy	Rules of the Nautical Road	Special Circumstances	14 min	1943	Limited animation produced by Disney to explain various incidents at sea and rule changes. Unlear at this moment if any of the Rules of Nautical Road films included any live-action footage.
U.S Navy	Rules of the Nautical Road	The Beaver-Selja Incident	5 min	1943	Limited animation produced by Disney to explain various incidents at sea and rule changes. Unlear at this moment if any of the Rules of Nautical Road films included any live-action footage.
U.S Navy	Rules of the Nautical Road	Special Steering and Sailing Rules	14 min	1943	Limited animation produced by Disney to explain various incidents at sea and rule changes. Unlear at this moment if any of the Rules of Nautical Road films included any live-action footage.
U.S Army	Glider Training	Structure and Aerodynamics	unknown	1943	Disney produced 17 min of animation and total of 23 min of footage for Gilder Training series. It is unclear at this point what kind of animation was produced for this series and how it divided between individual films. Limited animation explaining Gilder Training is most likely.
U.S Army	Glider Training	Flying Operations	unknown	1943	Disney produced 17 min of animation and total of 23 min of footage for Gilder Training series. It is unclear at this point what kind of animation was produced for this series and how it divided between individual films. Limited animation explaining Gilder Training is most likely.
U.S Army	Glider Training	Instruments	unknown	1943	Disney produced 17 min of animation and total of 23 min of footage for Gilder Training series. It is unclear at this point what kind of animation was produced for this series and how it divided between individual films. Limited animation explaining Gilder Training is most likely.
U.S Army	Glider Training	Air Works	unknown	1943	Disney produced 17 min of animation and total of 23 min of footage for Gilder Training series. It is unclear at this point what kind of animation was produced for this series and how it divided between individual films. Limited animation explaining Gilder Training is most likely.
U.S Navy	The Mark 13-Modification I Aerial Torpedo	Mechanical Operation	unknown	1943	Disney produced 121 min of animation for The Mark 13-Modification I Aerial Torpedo series. It is unclear at this point what kind of animation was produced for this series and how it divided between individual films. Limited animation explaining Aerial Torpedo is most likely.
U.S Navy	The Mark 13-Modification I Aerial Torpedo	Depth Control Mechanism	unknown	1943	Disney produced 121 min of animation for The Mark 13-Modification I Aerial Torpedo series. It is unclear at this point what kind of animation was produced for this series and how it divided between individual films. Limited animation explaining Aerial Torpedo is most likely.
U.S Navy	The Mark 13-Modification I Aerial Torpedo	War Head Attachment	unknown	1943	Disney produced 121 min of animation for The Mark 13-Modification I Aerial Torpedo series. It is unclear at this point what kind of animation was produced for this series and how it divided between individual films. Limited animation explaining Aerial Torpedo is most likely.
U.S Navy	The Mark 13-Modification I Aerial Torpedo	The Gyro Mechanism, Part 1	unknown	1943	Disney produced 121 min of animation for The Mark 13-Modification I Aerial Torpedo series. It is unclear at this point what kind of animation was produced for this series and how it divided between individual films. Limited animation explaining Aerial Torpedo is most likely.
U.S Navy	The Mark 13-Modification I Aerial Torpedo	The Gyro Mechanism, Part 2	unknown	1943	Disney produced 121 min of animation for The Mark 13-Modification I Aerial Torpedo series. It is unclear at this point what kind of animation was produced for this series and how it divided between individual films. Limited animation explaining Aerial Torpedo is most likely.
U.S Navy	The Mark 13-Modification I Aerial Torpedo	Gyroscopic Creep and Precession in Torpedoes	unknown	1943	Disney produced 121 min of animation for The Mark 13-Modification I Aerial Torpedo series. It is unclear at this point what kind of animation was produced for this series and how it divided between individual films. Limited animation explaining Aerial Torpedo is most likely.
U.S Army	High Level Precision Bombing [Colonel Garland Project]	The Bombing Computers	25 min	1943	It is unknown what kind of animation Disney contributed to this series but is most likely animated diagrams explaining technology behind bombing. The names of the individual given in Shale's book are incorrect.
U.S Army	High Level Precision Bombing [Colonel Garland Project]	Combat Bombing Procedures	22 min	1943	It is unknown what kind of animation Disney contributed to this series but is most likely animated diagrams explaining technology behind bombing. The names of the individual given in Shale's book are incorrect.
Aeronca Aircraft Corp, U.S. Army	Basic Maintenance of Primary Training Airplanes [Aeronca Project]	Preflight and Daily Inspections	unknown	1943	Disney produced 112 min of footage for Basic Maintenance of Primary Training Airplanes [Aeronca Project] series, both live-action and animation explaining various Training Airplanes. Some of the animated sequences may have been cartoony in nature to lighten the mood.
Aeronca Aircraft Corp, U.S. Army	Basic Maintenance of Primary Training Airplanes [Aeronca Project]	Landing Gear, Wheels and Brakes	unknown	1943	Disney produced 112 min of footage for Basic Maintenance of Primary Training Airplanes [Aeronca Project] series, both live-action and animation explaining various Training Airplanes. Some of the animated sequences may have been cartoony in nature to lighten the mood.
Aeronca Aircraft Corp, U.S. Army	Basic Maintenance of Primary Training Airplanes [Aeronca Project]	Propeller and Power Plant	unknown	1943	Disney produced 112 min of footage for Basic Maintenance of Primary Training Airplanes [Aeronca Project] series, both live-action and animation explaining various Training Airplanes. Some of the animated sequences may have been cartoony in nature to lighten the mood.
Aeronca Aircraft Corp, U.S. Army	Basic Maintenance of Primary Training Airplanes [Aeronca Project]	Light Controls and Control Surfaces	unknown	1943	Disney produced 112 min of footage for Basic Maintenance of Primary Training Airplanes [Aeronca Project] series, both live-action and animation explaining various Training Airplanes. Some of the animated sequences may have been cartoony in nature to lighten the mood.
Aeronca Aircraft Corp, U.S. Army	Basic Maintenance of Primary Training Airplanes [Aeronca Project]	Engine Change	unknown	1943	Disney produced 112 min of footage for Basic Maintenance of Primary Training Airplanes [Aeronca Project] series, both live-action and animation explaining various Training Airplanes. Some of the animated sequences may have been cartoony in nature to lighten the mood.
U.S Navy	Carrier Rendezvous and Breakup	Aircraft Rendezvous	unknown	1943	Disney produced 44 min of footage for Carrier Rendezvous and Breakup series, most likely various animated diagrams to explain various aircraft formations.
U.S Navy	Carrier Rendezvous and Breakup	Aircraft Formation Breakup	unknown	1943	Disney produced 44 min of footage for Carrier Rendezvous and Breakup series, most likely various animated diagrams to explain various aircraft formations.
U.S. Army	—N/a	The Evasive Action	2 of ? min	1943	This film is not in Shale's book but a short clip of it can be found on Walt Disney Treasures: On the Front Lines. It includes both animated diagrams and live-action.
U.S. Navy	—N/a	Aircraft Carrier Landing Qualifications	10 of ? min.	1943	Its unknown what type of animation Disney produced for this film, but is probably animated diagrams.
U.S. Navy	—N/a	British Torpedo Plane Tactics	11 min.	1943	Its unknown what type of animation Disney produced for this film, but is probably animated diagrams. The film's total runtime is given rather than the Disney material alone. This film was originally supposed to be 17 minutes but was cut down for some reason.

==== 1944 ====
Client	Series title	Film title (total runtime)	Runtime (Disney total runtime)	Date	Notes
U.S Navy	Aircraft Production Processes Series [Mooney Project]	Aircraft Welding	? of ? min	1944	Only animation Disney produced for this series, where animated diagrams help to explain technology. Richard Shale's book states there are nine films about Aircraft Production Processes Series [Mooney Project], but only eight are listed.
U.S Navy	Aerology Series	Weather for the Navigator	39 of ? min	1944	Aerology Series was remade in 1960s as Metrology series, by Audio Productions.
U.S Army	Automotive Electricity for Military Vehicles	Principles of Automotive Electrical Circuits	? of 13 min	1944	The only animation Disney contributed to this series are animated diagrams explaining technology in various military vehicles. How each of them are divided between each film hasn't been traced.
U.S Army	Automotive Electricity for Military Vehicles	Principles of the Operation Generator	? of 13 min	1944	The only animation Disney contributed to this series are animated diagrams explaining technology in various military vehicles. How each of them are divided between each film hasn't been traced. Updated version of The Ignition Circuit can be found at archive.org.
U.S Army	Automotive Electricity for Military Vehicles	Principles of the Starting Motor	? of 14 min	1944	The only animation Disney contributed to this series are animated diagrams explaining technology in various military vehicles. How each of them are divided between each film hasn't been traced. Updated version of Principles of the Starting Motor can be found at archive.org.
U.S Army	Automotive Electricity for Military Vehicles	The Ignition Circuit	? of 11 min	1944	The only animation Disney contributed to this series are animated diagrams explaining technology in various military vehicles. Hiw each of them are divided between each film hasn't been traced.
U.S Army	Automotive Electricity for Military Vehicles	Principles of Operation of the Generator Regulator	? of 12 min	1944	The only animation Disney contributed to this series are animated diagrams explaining technology in various military vehicles. How each of them are divided between each film hasn't been traced. Updated version of Principles of the Starting Motor can be found at archive.org.
U.S Army	Automotive Electricity for Military Vehicles	Principles of Operation of the Automotive Magneto	? of 14 min	1944	The only animation Disney contributed to this series are animated diagrams explaining technology in various military vehicles. How each of them are divided between each film hasn't been traced.
U.S Army	Theory of Simplex and Phantom Circuits	Balanced conditions	13 min	1944	The only animation Disney contributed to this series are animated diagrams explaining electronic technology. The complete series can be found at archive.org.
U.S Army	Theory of Simplex and Phantom Circuits	Unbalanced conditions	18 min	1944	The only animation Disney contributed to this series are animated diagrams explaining electronic technology. The complete series can be found at archive.org.
U.S Army	Tuning Transmitters	Setting Frequency	? of 16 min	1944	Disney produced 20 minutes of animation for both of Tuning Transmitters films, but it is unclear at this point how it divides between the films. The animation is mostly diagrams explaining electronics.
U.S Army	Tuning Transmitters	Amplifier and Antenna Tuning	? of 20 min	1944	Disney produced 20 minutes of animation for both of Tuning Transmitters films, but it is unclear at this point how it divides between the films. The animation is mostly diagrams explaining electronics.
U.S. Army	—N/a	Carburetion, Basic Principles	12 of 27 min	1944	Its unknown what type of animation Disney produced for this film, but is probably animated diagrams.
U.S. Army	—N/a	Howitzer, 105 mm M2A1 and Carriage M2, Principles of Operation	6 of min 19	1944	Only animation produced for this film are of animated diagrams. https://www.youtube.com/watch?v=GKeTPh3e75M&t=756s
U.S. Army	—N/a	Operation and Maintenance of the Electronic Turbo Supercharger	39 min (total runtime both Disney and none-Disney material).	1944	Its unknown what type of animation Disney produced for this film, but is probably animated diagrams. The film shouldn't be confused with Turbosupercharger: Master of the Skies by Raphael G. Wolff Studios which can be found at https://www.youtube.com/watch?v=KFwwgbj9Bi8
U.S. Army	—N/a	Air Brakes, Principles of operation	9 of 25 min.	1944	Disney only produced animated diagrams to explain air brakes technology. This film can be found at The Internet Archive but is a reissue print from 1967, as the runtime of the 1967 version is intact to the original 1944 version.
U.S. Army	—N/a	Electric Brakes Principles of Operation	2 of 13 min	1944	It is unknown what type of animation Disney produced for this film, but is most likely animated diagrams.
U.S. Army	—N/a	Ward Care of Psychotic Patients	29 of 41 min	1944	Its unknown what type of animation Disney produced for this film, but is most likely diagrams explaining mental health
U.S. Army	A Few Quick Facts	Voting for Service Men overseas		?.?.1944	
U.S. Army	A Few Quick Facts	Venereal Disease		?.?.1944	Lost film

==== 1945 ====
Client	Series title	Film title (total runtime)	Runtime (Disney total runtime)	Date	Notes
U.S Army	Basic Map Reading	Conventional Signs	? of 19 min	1945	The only animation Disney produced in this film series are animated diagrams and maps. Disney produced total of 16 min of animation across the five Basic Map Reading films, but is unclear at this point how it was divided between the films. This series was re-released in 1953 and 1967. The second film can be viewed on the internet The short film Elevation, Distance and Grid (1967) is available for free viewing and download at the Internet Archive.
U.S Army	Basic Map Reading	Elevation, Distance and Grid	? of 27 min.	1945	The only animation Disney produced in this film series are animated diagrams and maps. Disney produced total of 16 min of animation across the five Basic Map Reading films, but is unclear at this point how it was divided between the films. This series was re-released in 1953 The short film Elevation, Distance and Grid (1967) is available for free viewing and download at the Internet Archive.
U.S Army	Basic Map Reading	Direction, Orientation, and Location With Compass	? of 34 min	1945	The only animation Disney produced in this film series are animated diagrams and maps. Disney produced total of 16 min of animation across the five Basic Map Reading films, but is unclear at this point how it was divided between the films. This series was re-released in 1953 and 1967.
U.S Army	Basic Map Reading	Direction, Orientation, and Location Without a Compass	? of 22 min	1945	The only animation Disney produced in this film series are animated diagrams and maps. Disney produced total of 16 min of animation across the five Basic Map Reading films, but is unclear at this point how it was divided between the films. This series was re-released in 1953 and 1967.
U.S Army	Basic Map Reading	Photos and Photomaps	? of 22 min	1945	The only animation Disney produced in this film series are animated diagrams and maps. Disney produced total of 16 min of animation across the five Basic Map Reading films, but is unclear at this point how it was divided between the films. This series was re-released in 1953 and 1967.
U.S. Army	—N/a	Dental Health	8 of 22 min	1945	The only type of animation Disney produced for this film, are diagrams of human anatomy. Army number 8-2096. * The short film Dental Health is available for free viewing and download at the Internet Archive..
U.S. Army	A Few Quick Facts	Another Change		?.?.1945	
U.S. Army	A Few Quick Facts	G. I. Bill of Rights		?.?.1946	

== Home media ==
Some of these propaganda and training films can be found uncut and uncensored on Walt Disney Treasures: On the Front Lines.

== See also ==
- Walt Disney's World War II propaganda productions
- List of Disney animated shorts
- List of Disney live-action shorts
