= Hitler's Children (1943 film) =

1943 American black-and-white propaganda film

- Lobby card
- Directed by: Edward Dmytryk
- Written by: Emmet Lavery
- Based on: Education for Death by Gregor Ziemer
- Produced by: Edward A. Golden
- Starring: Tim Holt; Bonita Granville; Kent Smith; Otto Kruger; H. B. Warner; Lloyd Corrigan; Erford Gage; Hans Conried; Gavin Muir; Nancy Gates
- Cinematography: Russell Metty
- Music by: Roy Webb
- Production company: RKO Radio Pictures, Inc.
- Distributed by: RKO Radio Pictures
- Release date: March 19, 1943
- Running time: 83 minutes
- Country: United States
- Language: English
- Budget: $205,000
- Box office: $3,355,000

Hitler's Children is a 1943 American black-and-white war film made by RKO Radio Pictures. The film stars Tim Holt, Bonita Granville and Kent Smith and was directed by Edward Dmytryk from an adaptation by Emmet Lavery of Gregor Ziemer's book Education for Death, which had previously been adapted as a Disney animated short film.

The film was among the most financially successful produced by RKO Studios. It is known for its portrayal of brutality associated with the Hitler Youth, represented particularly by two young participants, Karl Bruner and Anna Muller.

== Plot ==
In 1933 Berlin, Professor Nichols runs the American Colony School. It is next to the Horst Wessel School, where young Germans are indoctrinated into Nazism. During a brawl between the student bodies, Karl Bruner, a German youth born in the United States, objects when Anna Muller, an American citizen born in Germany, smacks him with her baseball bat. (Note: While playing the piano, Anna says hockey stick, but it is clear she was holding a bat.) However, the two are attracted to each other. Nichols, Anna and Karl become good friends, though they do not agree politically. After a while, they lose touch with each other.

Six years later, as war looms in Europe, Karl, now a lieutenant in the Gestapo, removes students of foreign nationalities from the American school. Anna is also removed even though she is working there as an assistant teacher. Because she was born in Germany to German parents, the German government classifies her as German despite her American citizenship.

Nichols tries to find Anna but the American consulate has no power and Anna's German grandparents are too frightened to help. Nichols' friend Franz Erhart, a formerly bold journalist who now fears being reported by his own children, suggests that Nichols seek permission from the Ministry of Education to inspect a labor camp where Muller is likely being held. Nichols meets Gestapo Colonel Henkel and his aide and protégé Bruner. Henkel approves Nichols' request to visit Anna but, in private, Bruner tries to dissuade Nichols, insisting that Anna has now been converted to Nazi ideology. Bruner is disbelieving but when he meets Anna at the camp she acts as if she is a true believer. After Nichols leaves, Bruner tells Anna that he has recommended her for an advanced geopolitik course at a German university. Anna reveals that she hates the system and has gone along with it because she has no choice.

When Anna is interviewed by Henkel and Dr. Graf of the education department, she furiously declines the opportunity, making her true feelings clear. She is sent back to the camp and demoted from the staff to a laborer position. When she persists in anti-Nazi behavior, Henkel orders that she be sterilized. When Karl learns of this, he tries to persuade Anna to pretend to be a good Nazi and bear his child to prove her usefulness to Germany but she refuses.

Anna flees the camp and reaches Berlin, where she hides in a church. A search party finds her and takes her away over the protests of the bishop. Henkel orders her to receive ten lashes and sends Karl to witness her punishment. After she is whipped the second time, Karl stops the action, although he knows that he has doomed himself and Anna.

Karl pretends to have realized his mistake and recants. However, Henkel arranges for a national radio broadcast of the trial of Anna and Karl and promises Karl full honors at his funeral. Nichols is ordered to leave Germany immediately; if he does not, he will be arrested as an accessory to treason. At the airport, Nichols hears Karl's opening statement denouncing Adolf Hitler's Germany before Karl is shot and killed. Anna is shot and killed as she rushes to Karl.

== Cast ==
- Tim Holt as Lieutenant Karl Bruner
- Bonita Granville as Anna Muller
- Kent Smith as Professor Nichols
- Otto Kruger as Colonel Henkel
- H. B. Warner as Bishop
- Lloyd Corrigan as Franz Erhart
- Erford Gage as Dr. Schmidt
- Hans Conried as Dr. Graf
- Gavin Muir as Major
- Nancy Gates as Brenda

== Production ==
Tim Holt was offered the lead role of Karl Bruner but when it seemed that he would be unavailable, Kent Smith was assigned. However, Holt ended up playing Karl and Smith moved to the supporting role of Professor Nichols. Originally Hitler's Children was directed by Irving Reis but he fought with producer Edward A. Golden early into filming and resigned. Edward Dmytryk, who wrote that Reis "was rather headstrong and somewhat touchy," expected to receive an apology and be asked to return to the film but RKO asked Dmytryk to take over. He agreed, provided he was given Reis' blessing, which he was.

== Reception ==
In a contemporary review for The New York Times, critic Bosley Crowther considered the melodrama to be "obvious, conventional" and noted: "Edward Dmytryk, who directed, has set the whole thing in an oratorical style and has given it the quality of a philippic rather than a credible story from life." Despite lukewarm critical reviews, Hitler's Children was a great financial success, grossing $2,655,000 domestically and $700,000 foreign and earning RKO a profit of $1.21 million. It was also RKO's most successful film of the year. Dmytryk and writer Emmet Lavery were awarded $5,000 bonuses for their work. The film's great success led RKO to hire Dmytryk to direct other war films. He directed Back to Bataan, The Young Lions and the smash hit The Caine Mutiny. The last war film that he made was Anzio (1968).

== See also ==
- Education for Death, the Disney cartoon based on Ziemer's book
- Hitler – Dead or Alive
- The Strange Death of Adolf Hitler (film)
- The Hitler Gang
