= The Spirit of '43 =

1943 Donald Duck cartoon

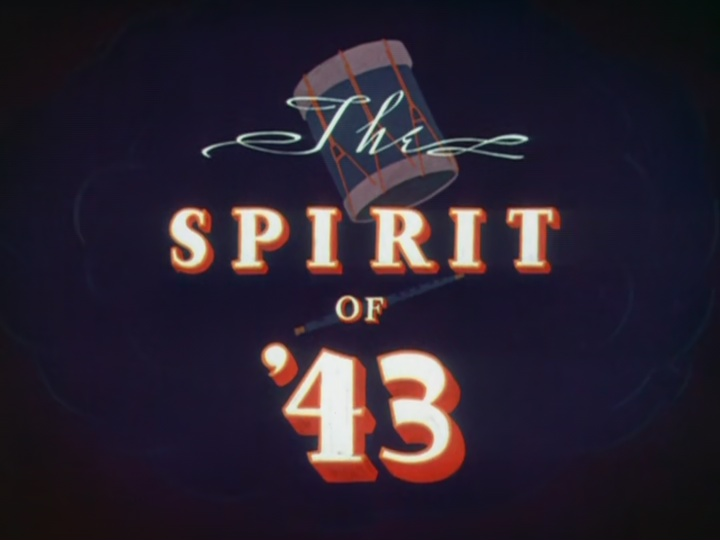
- Theatrical release title card
- Directed by: Jack King
- Story by: Carl Barks
- Produced by: Walt Disney
- Starring: Clarence Nash
- Narrated by: Fred Shields
- Animation by: Ward Kimball
- Color process: Technicolor
- Production company: Walt Disney Productions
- Distributed by: RKO Radio Pictures
- Release date: January 7, 1943
- Running time: 6 minutes
- Country: United States
- Language: English

The Spirit of '43 is an American animated World War II propaganda film created by Walt Disney Studios and released in January 1943. The film stars Donald Duck and features writer/designer Carl Barks' prototype for the character Scrooge McDuck. It is a sequel to The New Spirit. The purpose of the film is to encourage patriotic Americans to file and pay their income taxes faithfully in order to help the war effort. The repeated theme in the film is "taxes to defeat the Axis".

The film is in the public domain and therefore can be seen on many gray market videos as well as official Disney releases.

The title is an allusion to the expression "Spirit of '76" (referring to the sentiment around the American Revolution in 1776).

== Plot ==
In the film, Donald Duck is portrayed as an everyman who has just received his weekly pay. He is met by two physical manifestations of his personality—the classic "good angel on one shoulder, bad devil on the other shoulder" dilemma common to cartoons of the time—identified as the "thrifty saver" and the "spendthrift".

The "good duck" appears as an elderly duck in Scottish garb who urges Donald to be thrifty with his money so he can pay his taxes and help the war effort. The "bad duck" appears as a zoot suit-wearing hipster who urges Donald to spend his money on idle pleasures such as "good dates". The good duck reminds him of other "dates": the dates when his taxes are due. The narrator explains that Americans should "gladly and proudly" pay their income taxes which are higher than ever that year "thanks to Hitler and Hirohito".

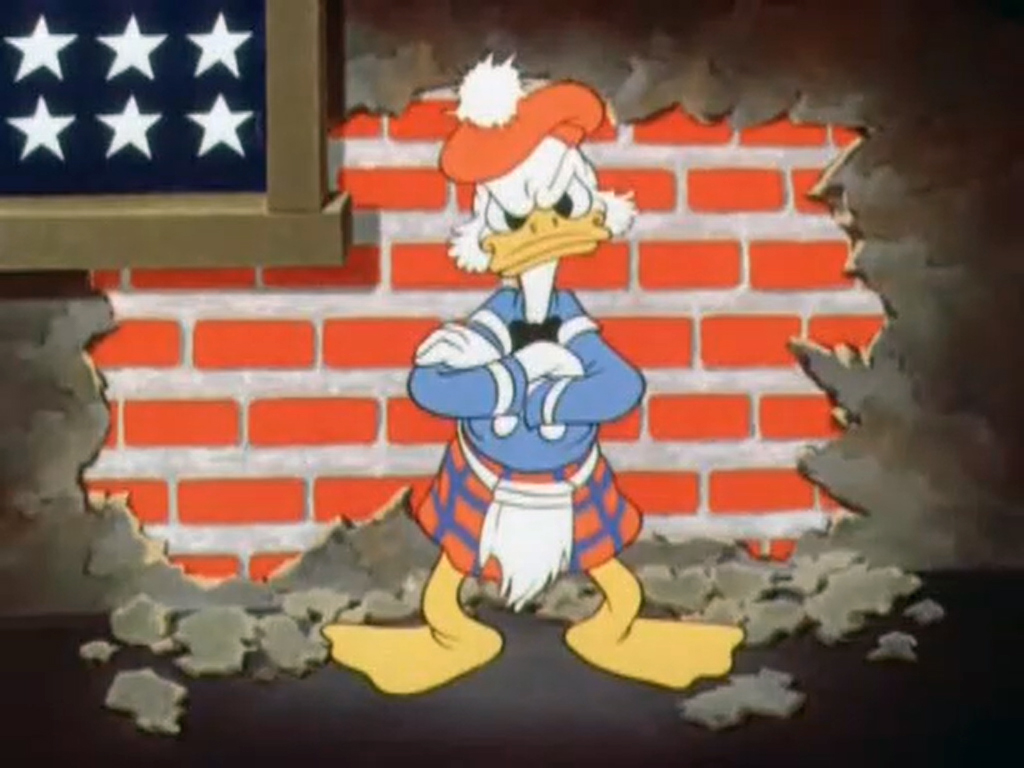
The good duck trying to get Donald to save his pay for taxes.

A tug-of-war ensues between "spend" and "save" with Donald caught in the middle. Eventually the two burst apart and Donald sees them for who they really are: one a friend of Hitler, the other an American patriot. The narrator asks the audience whether they will "spend for the Axis" or "save for taxes". Donald chooses the latter and goes to pay his taxes with the good duck.

The second part of the film is a montage entirely recycled from The New Spirit, showing how the taxes are being used to make planes, bombs, ships, and other war materials. It then shows them being used against Axis forces, along with the repeated slogan "taxes to (bury, sink, etc.) the Axis", accompanied by the opening bars of Beethoven's Fifth Symphony (the "V for Victory" theme).

== Voice cast ==
- Clarence Nash as Donald Duck

== Home media ==
The short was released on May 18, 2004, on Walt Disney Treasures: Walt Disney on the Front Lines.
