= Blank: A Vinylmation Love Story =

- Official Film Poster
- Directed by: Mike Ambs; Paul Foyder; Gino Roy; Whitfield Scheidegger; Greg Shewchuk
- Written by: Mike Ambs; Paul Foyder; Gino Roy; Whitfield Scheidegger; Greg Shewchuk
- Produced by: Sam DelPilar; Zadi Diaz; Margie Gilmore; Kelly Hirano; Whitfield Scheidegger; Greg Shewchuk; Mark L. Walker; Kristen Woolley; Matt Wyatt
- Cinematography: Mike Ambs; Whitfield Scheidegger
- Edited by: Paul Foyder
- Music by: Alfred Montejano
- Animation by: Matthew Manning; Alfonso Estrada
- Production company: Disney Interactive
- Release date: February 14, 2014 (El Capitan Theatre)
- Running time: 38 minutes
- Country: United States
- Language: English

Blank: A Vinylmation Love Story is a stop-motion short-film by Vinylmation and Disney Interactive. The project was first announced at the 2013 D23 Expo. The film is created by Gino Roy, Paul Foyder, Greg Shewchuk, Mike Ambs, and Whitfield Scheidegger, with original music composed by Alfred Montejano. The film premiered on February 14, 2014 on Google Play. It played as a double-feature with Lady and the Tramp at the El Capitan Theater in LA on Valentine's Day. Disney Interactive later released Cranes in Love online.

== Synopsis ==
In search of his lost soulmate, an unpainted Vinylmation finds himself on a quest that alters the destiny of his entire world. Blank is an epic adventure in miniature scale, a completely original, heartwarming love story filmed entirely in practical stop motion.

== Production and Music ==
Blank: A Vinylmation Love Story had an extremely small production team, made up of five writer/directors, Mike Ambs, Paul Foyder, Regino Roy III, Whitfield Scheidegger, and Greg Shewchuk, with just a few extra crew members. The creation of the sets and props used throughout the film, as well as the writing and directing, was a collaborative effort. All of their work fit into a single small studio space in Burbank, CA, where even the score was produced in-house by composer Alfred Montejano. “At various points in the project, we had one or two animators assisting us, and then depending on the need we would occasionally bring in a gaffer, or an animation and character design technical consultant. It is a remarkably small team to achieve something of this size.” Matt Wyatt, Creative Director, commented.

The process that went into creating Blank: A Vinylmation Love Story, all started in 2012 when the creators put together a short presentation exploring a story they had been tossing around with each other. “From there we started showing that to people. It had so much heart and creativity, and people were really into it, that it became a much bigger venture at that point. From there the creators got together and started brainstorming, and breaking the story into the pieces it would ultimately become: a much more epic adventure and love story.” explained Wyatt.

Production ran for about 160 days and the team even kept a flip-clock towards the end of production. “The characters and the locations and the props were all hand-crafted under the direction of the directors and production designer. The attention to detail was incredible and all of the guys are really amazing about taking raw materials and making them into things that really come to life. There's some incredible instances of taking everyday objects and turning them into these mystical worlds.”

The entire land that the story takes place was modeled directly on top of Disneyland. The film itself had very, very little post-graphics work. The team went to pretty extreme lengths during production to do as much of the film in-camera, and they wanted it to feel like older Disney films in that sense or, at least, get the feeling of older Disney films. “Even the fireworks that you see in the film are done with stop-motioned-controlled fiber-optic cables that were painted black (so only the ends showed light). The original pilot or pitch for the film was done with about $400 and 12 hours of work during a week of downtime at the studio (it was 100% a personal project for us)."

“...creating Blank was the fact that none of the creators had done any stop motion animation before. It was a learning experience every step of the way. Every day we were faced with new challenges that we were forced to come up with solutions for. It was a real testament as to what you can learn through research and internet browsing.” - Editor Paul Foyder on his experience on creating BLANK

“I think the most challenging part of writing the music for Blank was clearing my head of any preconceived ideas of what the music should be like for your typical animated love story. The creators were, of course, a helpful part of the process. My job was to find that voice & to help tell the story as honestly as possible. After initially reflecting on the aesthetics (the lush palettes, beautiful lighting & design, etc.) I decided to go into the stages and watch the lighting directors & animators which was truly inspiring & somehow that process spoke to me. This particular type of animation (stop motion) is very special and was, in and of itself, inspiring on so many levels. At the end of it I found it was clear that since there was no dialog, the central themes of identity, strength, friendship & love were what needed to speak musically & hopefully I was able to pull that off.” - Music Composer Alfred Montejano on how he created the music for BLANK

== Awards and Accolades ==
- 2014 Best Shorts Competition – Best of Show
- 18th Annual LA Shorts Fest – Best Animated Short
- 2014 New Media Film Festival – Best Animated Short
- Rhode Island International Film Festival 2014 – Best Animation (First Prize)
- 2014 Telly Awards – Online Video: Animation (silver), For Children (bronze) and Film/Video: Use of Animation (bronze), Children's audience (silver)
