= Gregor Ziemer =

American screenwriter

Gregor Athalwin Ziemer (May 24, 1899 – August 1982) was an American educator, writer, and correspondent. He graduated from the University of Illinois at Urbana-Champaign in 1922 with an English degree. Ziemer lived in Germany from 1928 to 1939, during which time he served as the headmaster of the American School in Berlin. After fleeing Germany, Ziemer returned to his wife Edna's hometown of Lake City, Minnesota. Ziemer wrote a couple of notable books about Nazi society: Education for Death, which inspired the eponymous Disney short, and, more directly, Edward Dmytryk's movie Hitler's Children, as well as, along with his daughter Patricia, Two Thousand and Ten Days of Hitler.

For a time from November 1941, Ziemer was a commentator on European affairs with radio station WLW out of Cincinnati. He later returned to Europe as a correspondent, embedded this time with General George Patton's Third Army.

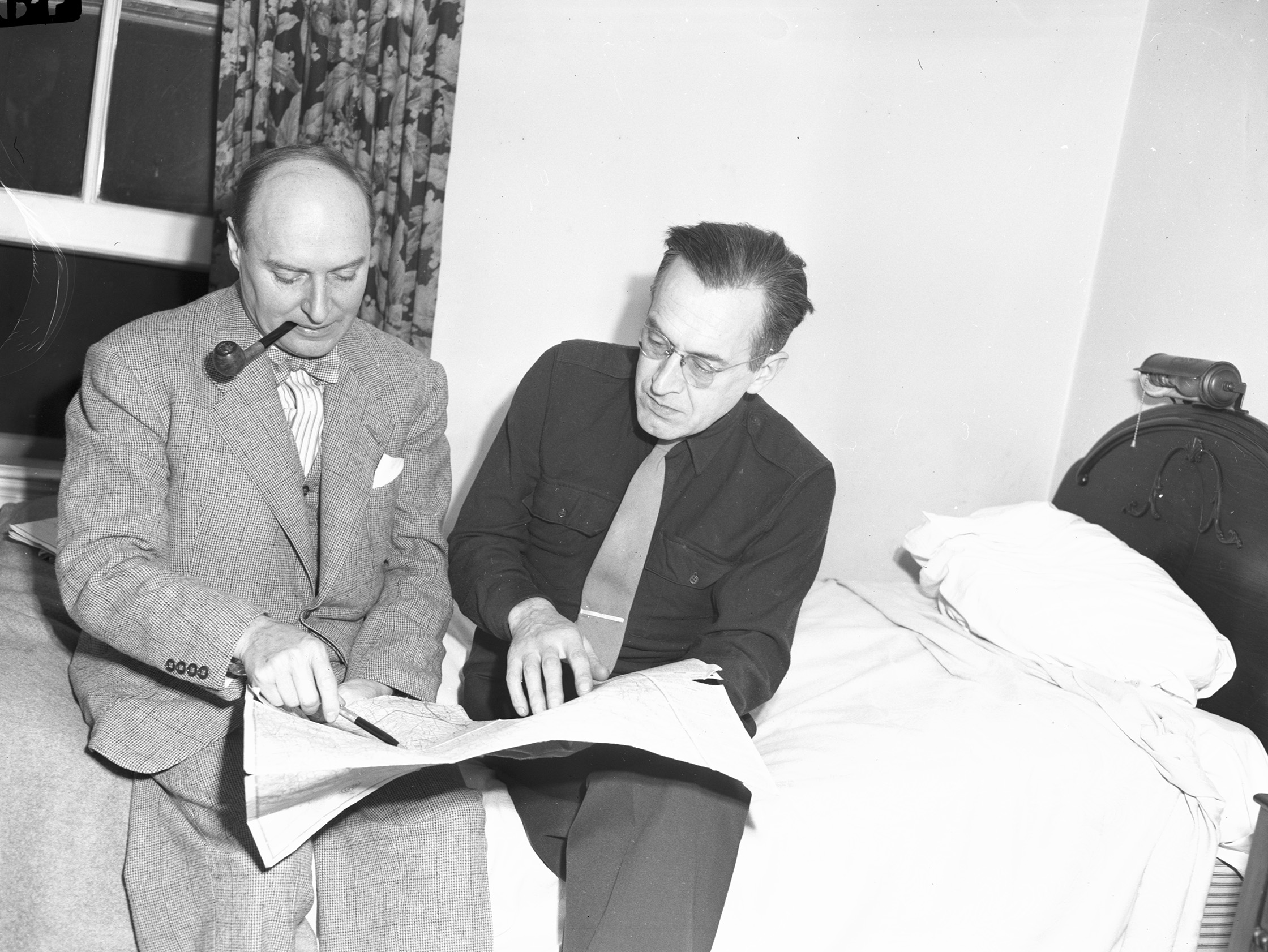
Writers Gregor Ziemer and F. R. Buckley in 1945

At the Nuremberg Trials, an affidavit by Ziemer (an excerpt of one of his books), dealing with Nazi society in general and the education of youth in particular, was presented by the prosecutors. According to Reichsjugendführer Baldur von Schirach, this writing contained untruth and had "more importance as propaganda than it tends to be objective" and was "clearly inflammatory".

Ziemer, who lived in California but summered in Lake City, kept busy as a writer of stories and articles and author of screenplays, contributing to the Saturday Evening Post and other popular magazines of the mid-20th century. He later served as a director of the American Foundation for the Blind as well as director of the Institute of Lifetime Learning. Among his key contacts in his charitable work was Hoagy Carmichael. From 1926 to 1927, he also taught in the Cebu Provincial High School in the Philippines, where one of his students, Antonio Allego, would later become a renowned poet, essayist, and columnist in the Philippines.

A manuscript for a book about the history of water skiing was discovered only recently among Ziemer's papers by one of his publishers.
