= Education for Death =

1943 animated short film by Clyde Geronimi

Education for Death: The Making of the Nazi
- Directed by: Clyde Geronimi
- Written by: Joe Grant
- Based on: Education for Death: The Making of the Nazi by Gregor Ziemer
- Produced by: Walt Disney
- Narrated by: Art Smith
- Music by: Oliver Wallace
- Production company: Walt Disney Productions
- Distributed by: RKO Radio Pictures
- Release date: January 15, 1943
- Running time: 10 minutes
- Country: United States
- Languages: English (narrator); German (characters)

Education for Death: The Making of the Nazi is an American animated anti-Nazi propaganda short film produced by Walt Disney Productions and released on January 15, 1943, by RKO Radio Pictures, shown in theaters with Fighting Frontier. The film is directed by Clyde Geronimi and principally animated by Milt Kahl, Ward Kimball, Frank Thomas, and Bill Tytla. The short is based on the non-fiction book of the same name by American author Gregor Ziemer. The film features the story of Hans, a boy born and raised in Nazi Germany, his indoctrination in the Hitlerjugend, and his eventual march to war.

== Plot ==
The film depicts the upbringing of a German boy, Hans, under the Nazi regime. After his birth, his parents are required to prove their Aryan ancestry to a state official, who approves his name and symbolically enrolls him in service to the state.

As Hans grows, he is exposed to propaganda that reshapes traditional stories and ideals to glorify Adolf Hitler and Nazi ideology. During a childhood illness, his mother fears state intervention if he does not recover, reflecting the regime’s intolerance for weakness. He eventually returns to school, where strict indoctrination emphasizes obedience, strength, and the rejection of compassion. After expressing sympathy during a lesson, Hans is punished and pressured to adopt the approved beliefs.

Hans participates in activities that reinforce Nazi doctrine, including book burnings and the replacement of religious teachings with state ideology. Over time, he progresses through youth organizations into adulthood, fully conforming to the expectations of the regime. The film concludes with Hans marching to war alongside other soldiers, before the image transitions to a field of identical graves, underscoring the consequences of his indoctrination.

== Production ==
Education for Death: The Making of the Nazi was released when Disney was under government contract to produce 32 animated shorts from 1941 to 1945. In 1940, Walt Disney spent four times his budget on the feature film Fantasia (1940), which suffered from low box office turnout. Nearing bankruptcy and with half of his employees on strike, Walt Disney was forced to look for a solution to bring money into the studio. The studio's proximity to the military aircraft manufacturer, Lockheed, helped foster a U.S. government contract for 32 short propaganda films at $4,500 each. This saved the company from bankruptcy and allowed it to keep its employees on payroll.

The dialogue of the characters is in German, neither subtitled nor directly translated by Art Smith's lone English language narration. A voice track of Adolf Hitler in a full demagogic rant is used in a torchlight rally scene.

== Home media ==
The short was released on May 18, 2004, on Walt Disney Treasures: Walt Disney on the Front Lines.

== Relationship to the Ziemer book ==
Gregor Ziemer, an American author and educator who lived in Germany from 1928 to 1939, wrote the book Education for Death after fleeing Germany on the eve of World War II. The book highlights what was going on in the Nazi schooling of the German youth.

The narrative story focuses on a group of youth who, under the guidance of a Nazi storm trooper, Franzen, take a hiking trip into the woods. As night falls, Franzen "lectures the troop on their duty to preserve the purity of the human race, and proposes they symbolize this task with a solemn ritual to 'impress on us all that fire and destruction will be the end of those who do not think as we do'." Franzen then hands out six books: the Talmud, the Koran, the works of Shakespeare, the Treaty of Versailles, a biography of Joseph Stalin, and the Bible. The books are passed around the circle, and each boy spits on the books and hands them back to Franzen, who douses them with kerosene and lights them on fire. The troop then sings the "Deutschlandlied" ("Deutschland, Deutschland über alles") and the Horst Wessel anthem around the fire.

The book inspired two different adaptations; Education for Death and Hitler's Children. The former took Ziemer's conclusions very seriously, as it showed the education of Hans from an innocent, kind youth into a chained and muzzled Nazi drone. The scene of the stormtrooper and the hiking trip is transplanted to a classroom where the teacher instructs the students about nature's laws, about the strong fox having the right to kill the weak rabbit. When Hans does not agree with the teacher, he is punished until he falls in line. The scene involving the book burning is part of the ending compilation of Nazi transformation and destruction. It shows a torch-bearing crowd setting fire to a pile of books of John Milton, Baruch Spinoza, Albert Einstein, Voltaire, and Thomas Mann. It then shows a burning of Felix Mendelssohn's wedding march, an allusion to the Nazi race laws, and the burning of a pile of art.

== See also ==
- Walt Disney's World War II propaganda production
- American propaganda during World War II
- Der Fuehrer's Face
- Don't Be a Sucker
- List of World War II short films
