= Walt Disney Productions short films (1950–1959) =

This is a list of short films created by Walt Disney Animation Studios between the years 1950 and 1959.

== 1950 ==
Series	Title	Director	Release Date	DVD Release	Notes
Pluto	Pluto's Heart Throb	Charles Nichols	January 6	"The Complete Pluto, Volume Two" "Mickey & Minnie's Sweetheart Stories"	
Donald Duck	Lion Around	Jack Hannah	January 20	"The Chronological Donald, Volume Three" "Funny Factory with Hewey, Dewey & Louie"	First appearance of Louie the Mountain Lion.
Pluto	Pluto and the Gopher	Charles Nichols	February 10	"The Complete Pluto, Volume Two" "Best Pals: Mickey and Minnie" "Mickey & Friends: 10 Classic Shorts" (Blu-ray)	Final appearance of Minnie Mouse.
—N/a	The Brave Engineer	Jack Kinney	March 3	"Disney Rarities: Celebrated Shorts: 1920s–1960s" Disney's American Legends	
Donald Duck	Crazy Over Daisy	Jack Hannah	March 25	"The Chronological Donald, Volume Three" "Best Pals: Donald and Daisy"	Only cartoon to co-star Daisy Duck and Chip 'n' Dale
Pluto	Wonder Dog	Charles Nichols	April 7	"The Complete Pluto, Volume Two"	
Donald Duck	Trailer Horn	Jack Hannah	April 28	"The Chronological Donald, Volume Three" "Extreme Adventure Fun"	
Pluto	Primitive Pluto	Charles Nichols	May 19	"The Complete Pluto, Volume Two"	
Pluto	Puss Cafe	Charles Nichols	June 9	"The Complete Pluto, Volume Two"; Oliver & Company (20th Anniversary)	
Goofy	Motor Mania	Jack Kinney	June 30	"The Complete Goofy"	
Pluto	Pests of the West	Charles Nichols	July 21	"The Complete Pluto, Volume Two"	
Pluto	Food for Feudin'	Charles Nichols	August 11	"The Complete Pluto, Volume Two" "Starring Chip 'n' Dale"; Disney's Have a Laugh!, Volume One"	
Donald Duck	Hook, Lion and Sinker	Jack Hannah	September 1	"The Chronological Donald, Volume Three"	
Pluto	Camp Dog	Charles Nichols	September 22	"The Complete Pluto, Volume Two"	
Donald Duck	Bee at the Beach	Jack Hannah	October 13	"The Chronological Donald, Volume Three" "Starring Donald"	
Goofy	Hold That Pose	Jack Kinney	November 3	"The Complete Goofy" "Starring Goofy"	First appearance of Humphrey the Bear.
—N/a	Morris the Midget Moose	Charles Nichols	November 24	"Disney Rarities: Celebrated Shorts: 1920s–1960s" "Timeless Tales, Volume Three"	
Donald Duck	Out on a Limb	Jack Hannah	December 15	"The Chronological Donald, Volume Three" "Starring Chip 'n' Dale"	

== 1951 ==
Series	Title	Director	Release Date	DVD Release	Notes
Goofy	Lion Down	Jack Kinney	January 5	"The Complete Goofy" "Starring Goofy"	
Chip 'n' Dale	Chicken in the Rough	Jack Hannah	January 19	"Starring Chip 'n' Dale"	First cartoon produced in the Chip 'n' Dale series.
Pluto	Cold Storage	Jack Kinney	February 9	"The Complete Pluto, Volume Two"	
Donald Duck	Dude Duck	Jack Hannah	March 2	"The Chronological Donald, Volume Four"	
Goofy	Home Made Home	Jack Kinney	March 23	"The Complete Goofy"	
Donald Duck	Corn Chips	Jack Hannah	March 23	"The Chronological Donald, Volume Four" "Holiday Celebration with Mickey & Pals"	
Goofy	Cold War	Jack Kinney	April 27	"The Complete Goofy"	
Pluto	Plutopia	Charles Nichols	May 18	"Mickey Mouse in Living Color, Volume Two" "The Complete Pluto, Volume Two" "Best Pals: Mickey and Pluto"	
Donald Duck	Test Pilot Donald	Jack Hannah	June 8	"The Chronological Donald, Volume Four"	
Goofy	Tomorrow We Diet!	Jack Kinney	June 29	"The Complete Goofy"	
Donald Duck	Lucky Number	Jack Hannah	July 20	"The Chronological Donald, Volume Four" "Funny Factory with Huey, Dewey & Louie"	
Mickey Mouse	R'coon Dawg	Charles Nichols	August 10	"Mickey Mouse in Living Color, Volume Two" "Funny Factory with Mickey"	
Goofy	Get Rich Quick	Jack Kinney	August 31	"The Complete Goofy"	
Pluto	Cold Turkey	Charles Nichols	September 21	"The Complete Pluto, Volume Two"	The final appearance of Milton the Cat. Final cartoon produced in the Pluto series.
Goofy	Fathers Are People	Jack Kinney	October 21	"The Complete Goofy"	
Donald Duck	Out of Scale	Jack Hannah	November 2	"The Chronological Donald, Volume Four" "Starring Chip 'n' Dale"	Concept inspired by the ridable miniature Carolwood Pacific Railroad located in Walt Disney's backyard
Goofy	No Smoking	Jack Kinney	November 23	"The Complete Goofy"	
Donald Duck	Bee on Guard	Jack Hannah	December 14	"The Chronological Donald, Volume Four"	

== 1952 ==
Series	Title	Director	Release Date	DVD Release	Notes
Goofy	Father's Lion	Jack Kinney	January 4	"The Complete Goofy" "Funny Factory with Goofy"	
Donald Duck	Donald Applecore	Jack Hannah	January 18	"The Chronological Donald, Volume Four"; Melody Time (Gold Classic Collection)	
—N/a	Lambert the Sheepish Lion	Jack Hannah	February 9	"Disney Rarities: Celebrated Shorts: 1920s–1960s" The Fox and the Hound (25th Anniversary); Melody Time (Gold Classic Collection)	
Goofy	Hello Aloha	Jack Kinney	February 19	"The Complete Goofy" "Extreme Adventure Fun" "It's a Small World of Fun, Volume 3"	
Chip 'n' Dale	Two Chips and a Miss	Jack Hannah	March 25	"Starring Chip 'n' Dale"	
Goofy	Teachers Are People	Jack Kinney	April 6	"The Complete Goofy"	
Donald Duck	Let's Stick Together	Jack Hannah	April 26	"The Chronological Donald, Volume Four"	
Goofy	Two-Gun Goofy	Jack Kinney	May 19	The Apple Dumpling Gang "The Complete Goofy"	Pete's first appearance since Trombone Trouble (1944).
—N/a	Susie the Little Blue Coupe	Clyde Geronimi	June 9	"It's a Small World of Fun, Volume 2"; The Adventures of Ichabod and Mr. Toad (Gold Collection); The Love Bug	
Goofy	Man's Best Friend	Jack Kinney	June 21	"Goofy's Fun House" (PlayStation) "The Complete Goofy" "Funny Factory with Goofy"	
Donald Duck	Uncle Donald's Ants	Jack Hannah	July 13	"The Chronological Donald, Volume Four"	
Mickey Mouse	Pluto's Party	Milt Schaffer	August 3	"Mickey Mouse in Living Color, Volume Two" "Best Pals: Mickey and Pluto" "Celebrating Mickey" (Blu-ray) "Mickey & Friends: 10 Classic Shorts" (Blu-ray)	
—N/a	The Little House	Wilfred Jackson	August 6	"Disney Rarities: Celebrated Shorts: 1920s–1960s" "It's a Small World of Fun, Volume 4"	
Donald Duck	Trick or Treat	Jack Hannah	October 6	The Black Cauldron "The Chronological Donald, Volume Four"	
Goofy	Two Weeks Vacation	Jack Kinney	October 21	"The Complete Goofy" "Extreme Adventure Fun"	
Mickey Mouse	Pluto's Christmas Tree	Jack Hannah	November 24	"Mickey Mouse in Living Color, Volume Two" "Classic Holiday Stories"	
Goofy	How to Be a Detective	Jack Kinney	December 21	"The Complete Goofy"	

== 1953 ==
Series	Title	Director	Release Date	DVD Release	Notes
Goofy	Father's Day Off	Jack Kinney	March 23	"The Complete Goofy" "Starring Goofy"	
Mickey Mouse	The Simple Things	Charles Nichols	April 18	"Mickey Mouse in Living Color, Volume Two" "Celebrating Mickey" (Blu-ray)	Final Mickey Mouse short produced by Walt Disney. Final appearance of Pluto.
Goofy	For Whom the Bulls Toil	Jack Kinney	May 10	"The Complete Goofy" "It's a Small World of Fun, Volume 4"	
Adventures in Music	Melody	Ward Kimball; Charles Nichols	May 26	"Disney Rarities: Celebrated Shorts: 1920s–1960s" "Fantasia 2000"	First of two Adventures in Music shorts. Released in 3-D.
Donald Duck	Don's Fountain of Youth	Jack Hannah	June 8	"The Chronological Donald, Volume Four" "Funny Factory with Huey, Dewey & Louie"	
Goofy	Father's Week-end	Jack Kinney	June 21	"The Complete Goofy" "Funny Factory with Goofy"	
Goofy	How to Dance	Jack Kinney	July 11	"The Complete Goofy" "Starring Goofy" "Extreme Music Fun"	Once reissued in parts of Europe in 1991.
Donald Duck	The New Neighbor	Jack Hannah	August 3	"The Chronological Donald, Volume Four"	
—N/a	Football Now and Then	Jack Kinney	September 14	Disney Rarities: Celebrated Shorts: 1920s–1960s	
Donald Duck	Working for Peanuts	Jack Hannah	October 18	"The Chronological Donald, Volume Four" "Starring Chip 'n' Dale"	Released in 3-D
Donald Duck	Rugged Bear	Jack Hannah	November 8	"The Chronological Donald, Volume Four"	
Adventures in Music	Toot, Whistle, Plunk and Boom	Ward Kimball; Charles Nichols	November 10	"Disney Rarities: Celebrated Shorts: 1920s–1960s" "Fantasia 2000"	Second of two Adventures in Music shorts.; First Disney cartoon produced in 2.35:1 CinemaScope.; First Disney cartoon distributed by Buena Vista Film Distribution Company, Inc.
—N/a	Ben and Me	Hamilton Luske	November 10	"Disney Rarities: Celebrated Shorts: 1920s–1960s" "Timeless Tales, Volume Three"	Received an Academy Award Nomination in the Short Subject (Two-reel) category.
Goofy	How to Sleep	Jack Kinney	December 25	"The Complete Goofy"	Final Goofy cartoon until 1961.
Donald Duck	Canvas Back Duck	Jack Hannah	December 25	"The Chronological Donald, Volume Four" "Funny Factory with Donald"	Final Cartoon to co-star Donald and Pete.; Only Cartoon to co-star Huey, Dewey & Louie and Pete.

== 1954 ==
Series	Title	Director	Release Date	DVD Release	Notes
Donald Duck	Spare the Rod	Jack Hannah	January 15	"The Chronological Donald, Volume Four"	
Donald Duck	Donald's Diary	Jack Kinney	March 5	"The Chronological Donald, Volume Four" "Best Pals: Donald and Daisy"	
Chip 'n' Dale	The Lone Chipmunks	Jack Kinney	April 19	Davy Crockett (two-movie set)	Final cartoon produced in Chip 'n' Dale series.; Only cartoon to co-star Chip 'n' Dale and Pete.; Final appearance of Pete.
—N/a	Pigs Is Pigs	Jack Kinney	May 21	"Disney Rarities: Celebrated Shorts: 1920s–1960s"	
—N/a	Casey Bats Again	Jack Kinney	June 18	Melody Time (Gold Classic Collection/Blu-ray)	Sequel short to the "Casey at the Bat" segment from Make Mine Music.
Donald Duck	Dragon Around	Jack Hannah	July 16	"The Chronological Donald, Volume Four" "Starring Chip 'n' Dale"	
Donald Duck	Grin and Bear It	Jack Hannah	August 13	"The Chronological Donald, Volume Four"	First appearance of Ranger J. Audubon Woodlore.
—N/a	Social Lion	Jack Kinney	October 15	"Disney Rarities: Celebrated Shorts: 1920s–1960s"	
Donald Duck	The Flying Squirrel	Jack Hannah	November 12	"The Chronological Donald, Volume Four"	
Donald Duck	Grand Canyonscope	Charles Nichols	November 23	20,000 Leagues Under the Sea "The Chronological Donald, Volume Four"	First short produced in both CinemaScope (2.35:1) and Academy Ratio (1.37:1).; First and only short to co-star Donald Duck, Ranger J. Audubon Woodlore and Louie the mountain lion, in the latter's final appearance.

== 1955 ==
Series	Title	Director	Release Date	DVD Release	Notes
Donald Duck	No Hunting	Jack Hannah	January 14	"The Chronological Donald, Volume Four"	Produced in both CinemaScope (2.35:1) and Academy Ratio (1.37:1).
Donald Duck	Bearly Asleep	Jack Hannah	August 19	"The Chronological Donald, Volume Four"	Produced in both CinemaScope (2.35:1) and Academy Ratio (1.37:1).,
Donald Duck	Up a Tree	Jack Hannah	September 23	"The Chronological Donald, Volume Four"	Only Produced in Academy Ratio (1.37:1).
Donald Duck	Beezy Bear	Jack Hannah	September 2	"The Chronological Donald, Volume Four"	Produced in both CinemaScope (2.35:1) and Academy Ratio (1.37:1). Final pairing of Donald and Humphrey.

== 1956 ==
Series	Title	Director	Release Date	DVD Release	Notes
Donald Duck	Chips Ahoy	Jack Kinney	February 24	"The Chronological Donald, Volume Four"	Produced in both CinemaScope (2.35:1) and Academy Ratio (1.37:1); The Last Donald Duck series short distributed by RKO. Final cartoon to co-star Donald Duck, Chip and Dale. Final appearance of Chip and Dale.
Humphrey the Bear Cartoon	Hooked Bear	Jack Hannah	April 27	"Disney Rarities: Celebrated Shorts: 1920s–1960s"	Produced in both CinemaScope (2.35:1) and Academy Ratio (1.37:1)
Donald Duck Cartoon	How to Have an Accident in the Home	Charles Nichols	July 7	"The Chronological Donald, Volume Four"	Produced in both CinemaScope (2.35:1) and Academy Ratio (1.37:1); Distributed by Buena Vista
—N/a	Jack and Old Mac	Bill Justice	July 18	"Disney Rarities: Celebrated Shorts: 1920s–1960s"	Distributed by Buena Vista
Humphrey the Bear Cartoon	In the Bag	Jack Hannah	July 27	"Disney Rarities: Celebrated Shorts: 1920s–1960s"	Last short produced in both CinemaScope (2.35:1) and Academy Ratio (1.37:1); Last short Distributed by RKO Radio Pictures. Final appearances of Ranger J. Audubon Woodlore and Humphrey the Bear.
—N/a	A Cowboy Needs a Horse	Bill Justice	November 6	"Disney Rarities: Celebrated Shorts: 1920s–1960s" "It's a Small World of Fun, Volume 1"	All shorts from now on distributed by Buena Vista

== 1957 ==
Series	Title	Director	Release Date	DVD Release	Notes
—N/a	The Story of Anyburg U.S.A.	Clyde Geronimi	June 19, 1957	"Disney Rarities: Celebrated Shorts: 1920s–1960s"	
—N/a	The Truth About Mother Goose	Wolfgang Reitherman; Bill Justice	August 28, 1957	"Disney Rarities: Celebrated Shorts: 1920s–1960s"	

== 1958 ==
Series	Title	Director	Release Date	DVD Release	Notes
—N/a	Paul Bunyan	Les Clark	August 1, 1958	"Disney Rarities: Celebrated Shorts: 1920s–1960s" "Disney's American Legends"	

== 1959 ==
Series	Title	Director	Release Date	DVD Release	Notes
Educational (Donald Duck)	Donald in Mathmagic Land	Hamilton Luske	June 26, 1959	"The Chronological Donald, Volume Four"; Donald in Mathmagic Land	In theaters with Darby O'Gill and the Little People; Received an Academy Award Nomination in the Documentary (short subject) category.
Donald Duck Cartoon	How to Have an Accident at Work	Charles Nichols	September 2, 1959	"The Chronological Donald, Volume Four"	Last Donald Duck cartoon to feature the Donald Duck theme.
—N/a	Noah's Ark	Bill Justice	November 10, 1959	"Disney Rarities: Celebrated Shorts: 1920s–1960s"	First stop-motion film created by Walt Disney Studio.

== Non-theatrical shorts ==
=== Industrial shorts ===
Series	Title	Director	Release date	DVD release	Notes
—N/a	How to Catch a Cold		August 1, 1951	—N/a	Produced for Kleenex Tissue; Despite being titled "How to.." Goofy does not appear in the short.
—N/a	Mickey Mouse March of Dimes		January 1, 1954	—N/a	Produced for March of Dimes.

== Bibliography ==
- Amendola, Dana (2015). All Aboard: The Wonderful World of Disney Trains (1st ed.). Disney Editions. ISBN 978-1-4231-1714-8.
