= Donald Duck (film series) =

Short film series

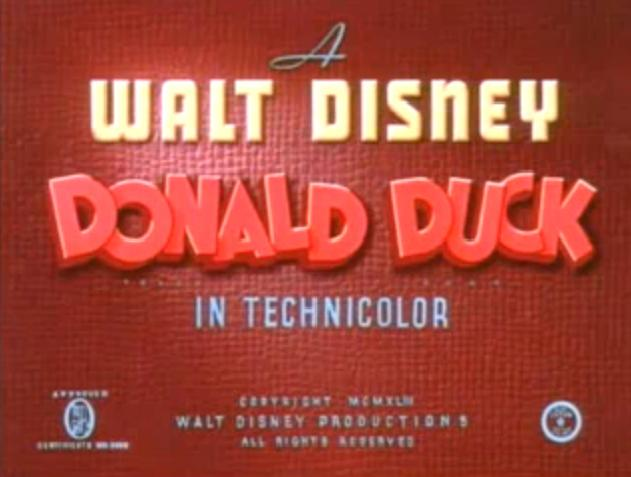
- Introductory title of the Donald Duck short films.
- Production company: Walt Disney Animation Studios
- Distributed by: RKO Radio Pictures (1937–1956); Walt Disney Studios Motion Pictures (1954, 1961, 2024) (Note: Also distributor of reissues of other short films in the series.)
- Country: United States
- Language: English

Donald Duck is a series of American animated comedy short films produced by Walt Disney Productions. It is a spin-off series of the Mickey Mouse short film series. The series started in 1937 with Donald's Ostrich and ended in 1961 with The Litterbug, with an additional short, D.I.Y. Duck, being released in 2024. Donald Duck also has its own spin-off series, Donald & Goofy, starring Donald Duck and Goofy.

The series stars the titular character Donald Duck, in addition to having recurring appearances by previously known characters such as Pluto and Pete. The series also introduced well-known characters such as Donald's nephews Huey, Dewey and Louie (previously introduced in comic books) and Donald's love interest Daisy Duck, as well as Donald's recurring rivals Chip 'n' Dale under their names (previously appearing without names in the shorts Private Pluto and Squatter's Rights).

== Production ==
After his debut in the short film The Wise Little Hen from the series Silly Symphony, Donald Duck became a recurring character in the short films of the series Mickey Mouse. Due to his popularity, Donald began starring in his own series of shorts, beginning with Donald's Ostrich on December 10, 1937. Similar to the Mickey Mouse series, the Donald Duck shorts begin with a close-up of Donald's face with a starburst behind him, followed by the title "A Walt Disney Donald Duck". The World War II-themed Donald shorts released during the 1940s, in which Donald is shown enlisting in the military, feature a variant of Donald's face with his sailor's hat exchanged for his privater's cap. Other Walt Disney Productions short films starring Donald outside of the Donald Duck series, like How to Have an Accident at Work (1959) – released as A Walt Disney Cartoon – and some educational films from 1960s, also include Donald's starburst picture in their introduction. In the shorts filmed in CinemaScope, also the intro changes to one with Donald shining a flashlight on the image with his face and then the text of the intro.

The series had annual releases from 1937 to 1956, later having a hiatus until the release in 1961 of The Litterbug, which, unlike the others, was presented without the starburst with Donald's face and under the title "Walt Disney presents Donald Duck". In 2024, due to the 90th anniversary of Donald Duck, Disney released an additional short, D.I.Y. Duck.

All films were distributed by RKO Radio Pictures, with the exception of Grand Canyonscope (1954) and The Litterbug, distributed under Buena Vista Distribution, which distributed most of the other shorts in re-releases, and D.I.Y. Duck, distributed by its production studio Walt Disney Animation Studios.

The cartoons were directed by 12 different people. Those with the most credits include Jack King (53) and Jack Hannah (48).

== List of films ==
The following is a list of Donald Duck short films.

This list does not include shorts from other series in which Donald Duck appears (such as those from the Mickey Mouse series, the Donald & Goofy series, or short films that aren't introduced as part of a specific series), segments from feature films (such as Blame It on the Samba or Pomp and Circumstance), nor shorts of Donald Duck made as part of the episodes of the television series Mickey Mouse Works. Don Donald and Modern Inventions, respectively from the Mickey Mouse and Silly Symphonies series, were later re-released under this series.

=== 1937 ===
#	Title	Director	Release
1	Donald's Ostrich	Jack King	December 10, 1937
Donald is the baggage handler at a train station, where part of the latest shipment is a gluttonous ostrich. Other appearances: Hortense the Ostrich; cameos by Shirley Temple

=== 1938 ===
#	Title	Director	Release
4	Self Control	Jack King	February 11, 1938
Donald tries to control his temper by following the advice of a radio program. Other appearances: Uncle Smiley (voice), Caterpillar, Hen, Woodpecker
5	Donald's Better Self	Jack King	March 10, 1938
Donald prepares to go to school, but is torn between his angelic side and his evil side whether or not to go. Other appearances: Donald's Angel, Donald's Devil
6	Donald's Nephews	Jack King	April 15, 1938
Donald receives a visit from his three nephews, who are quite unruly. Other appearances: Huey, Dewey and Louie (debut of the characters in animation), Dumbella Duck (mentioned)
7	Good Scouts	Jack King	July 8, 1938
Donald is the scoutmaster for his nephews on a camping trip, but his lack of leadership means the kids have to help him out of one problem after another. Other appearances: Huey, Dewey and Louie Notes: Nominated for Academy Award for Best Animated Short Film.
8	Donald's Golf Game	Jack King	November 4, 1938
Donald goes to play golf, with his nephews accompanying him as caddies. Other appearances: Huey, Dewey and Louie

=== 1939 ===
#	Title	Director	Release
9	Donald's Lucky Day	Jack King	January 13, 1939
On Friday the 13th, Donald runs into several unlucky obstacles while delivering a package, which contains a bomb. Other appearances: Gangster Leader (silhouette), Gangster Sidekick (silhouette)
10	The Hockey Champ	Jack King	April 28, 1939
Donald competes with his nephews playing hockey. Other appearances: Huey, Dewey and Louie
11	Donald's Cousin Gus	Jack King	May 19, 1939
Donald is visited by his cousin Gus, who has a hearty appetite. Other appearances: Gus Goose (debut of the character in animation)
12	Beach Picnic	Clyde Geronimi	June 9, 1939
Donald plays pranks on Pluto at the beach. Later they both have problems with ants at their picnic. Other appearances: Pluto, Ants
13	Sea Scouts	Dick Lundy	June 30, 1939
Donald leads a sea voyage with his nephews, where they encounter a ferocious shark. Other appearances: Huey, Dewey and Louie, Shark
14	Donald's Penguin	Jack King	August 11, 1939
Donald receives a penguin from the South Pole. Other appearances: Tootsie the Penguin
15	The Autograph Hound	Jack King	September 1, 1939
Donald tries to get autographs from celebrities in a Hollywood studio. Other appearances: Security Guard, animated versions of various celebrities
16	Officer Duck	Clyde Geronimi	September 22, 1939
Donald is a police officer who must arrest the criminal Tiny Tom (Pete). Other appearances: Pete (as "Tiny Tom")

=== 1940 ===
#	Title	Director	Release
17	The Riveter	Dick Lundy	March 15, 1940
During the construction of a building, Pete hires Donald as his riveter. Other appearances: Pete, Peter Pig (cameo)
18	Donald's Dog Laundry	Jack King	April 5, 1940
Donald tries to convince Pluto to try his mechanical laundromat for dogs. Other appearances: Pluto
19	Mr. Duck Steps Out	Jack King	June 7, 1940
Donald has a date with Daisy, which is constantly interrupted by his nephews. Other appearances: Daisy Duck (debut), Huey, Dewey and Louie
20	Put-Put Troubles	Riley Thomson	July 19, 1940
Donald and Pluto go sailing, but the day doesn't end as well as they hoped. Other appearances: Pluto
21	Donald's Vacation	Jack King	August 9, 1940
Donald has a hard time doing activities in the woods during his vacation. Other appearances: Chipmunks, Brown bear
22	Window Cleaners	Jack King	September 20, 1940
Donald and Pluto are cleaning windows in a skyscraper, where they end up in trouble with a bee. Other appearances: Pluto, Spike the Bee (debut as prototype)
23	Fire Chief	Jack King	December 13, 1940
Donald and his nephews are the staff at a fire station. Other appearances: Huey, Dewey and Louie

=== 1941 ===
#	Title	Director	Release
24	Timber	Jack King	January 10, 1941
Donald tries to steal food from lumberjack Pete's table. After catching him, Pete forces Donald to work cutting down trees. Other appearances: Pete
25	Golden Eggs	Wilfred Jackson	March 7, 1941
Donald goes into a chicken coop to get the chickens' eggs, but has trouble with the rooster that guards the place. Other appearances: Rooster, Hens
26	A Good Time for a Dime	Dick Lundy	May 9, 1941
At a penny arcade, Donald is entertained by various attractions. Other appearances: Daisy Duck (cameo)
27	Early to Bed	Jack King	July 11, 1941
Donald spends the night unable to sleep due to various problems.
28	Truant Officer Donald	Jack King	August 1, 1941
Donald catches his nephews swimming on a school day. Other appearances: Huey, Dewey and Louie Notes: Nominated for Academy Award for Best Animated Short Film.
29	Old MacDonald Duck	Jack King	September 12, 1941
Donald has a farm where he feeds the animals while singing "Old MacDonald Had a Farm". Other appearances: Farm animals
30	Donald's Camera	Dick Lundy	October 24, 1941
Donald decides to use his camera to photograph some wildlife, but the animals he finds torment him and hinder his efforts to photograph them. Other appearances: Forest animals
31	Chef Donald	Jack King	December 5, 1941
Donald tries to cook by listening to Old Mother Mallard's radio show. Other appearances: Old Mother Mallard (voices)

=== 1942 ===
#	Title	Director	Release
32	The Village Smithy	Dick Lundy	January 16, 1942
Donald is working as a blacksmith fixing an iron rim in a wagon wheel and putting a horseshoe on the donkey Jenny, having trouble with both. Other appearances: Jenny the Burro
33	The New Spirit	Wilfred Jackson; Ben Sharpsteen	January 23, 1942
Animated documentary promoting the timely filing and payment of federal income taxes, showing Donald Duck's difficulties with his tax return. Notes: Nominated for Academy Award for Best Documentary. World War II propaganda film, being the second as such starring Donald after Donald's Decision, and the first in the Donald Duck series.
34	Donald's Snow Fight	Jack King	April 10, 1942
Donald starts a snowball fight with his nephews. Other appearances: Huey, Dewey and Louie
35	Donald Gets Drafted	Jack King	May 1, 1942
Donald expresses his desire to join the Army Air Forces. During basic training, Sergeant Pete marches Donald's unit through the camp. Other appearances: Pete, Recruitment Agent, Team of Doctors Notes: Third World War II-themed short starring Donald, and the first in the "Donald in the Army" series.
36	Donald's Garden	Jack King	June 12, 1942
Donald has a garden full of melons, which is invaded by a hungry gopher. Other appearances: Gopher
37	Donald's Gold Mine	Jack King	July 24, 1942
Donald is digging his gold mine, clumsily doing it, which is great fun for his donkey. Other appearances: Jenny the Burro
38	The Vanishing Private	Jack King	September 25, 1942
Private Donald gets into trouble when he does his duty too well by painting camouflage with experimental paint that makes everything painted invisible. Other appearances: Pete, The General Notes: Fourth World War II-themed short starring Donald, and second in the "Donald in the Army" series.
39	Sky Trooper	Jack King	November 6, 1942
Private Donald finally gets a chance to fly in the Air Force, but ends up afraid to go parachuting. Other appearances: Pete Notes: Fifth World War II-themed short starring Donald, and the third in the "Donald in the Army" series.
40	Bellboy Donald	Jack King	December 18, 1942
Donald works as a bellboy at a hotel, where after Pete and his son arrive at the hotel, the boy doesn't stop causing trouble. Other appearances: Pete, Pete Junior (debut), Hotel manager

=== 1943 ===
#	Title	Director	Release
41	Der Fuehrer's Face	Jack Kinney	January 1, 1943
Donald has a nightmare in which he lives in Germany as a slave under the Nazi regime. Notes: Winner of the Academy Award for Best Animated Short Film, and the only Donald Duck film to receive the honor. Anti-Nazi propaganda film, being the sixth World War II-themed short starring Donald.
42	The Spirit of '43	Jack King	January 7, 1943
Documentary in which Donald deals with income taxes and his benefit to the American war effort. Notes: Propaganda film of the World War II, being the seventh short film starring Donald with this theme. The representation of "good luck" in the story is a duck similar to Scrooge McDuck (being an old duck in Scottish attire), who would debut years later in a comic by Carl Barks, the short film's screenwriter, and may be an anticipated prototype of said character.
43	Donald's Tire Trouble	Dick Lundy	January 29, 1943
While driving his car, Donald has a flat tire and changing it isn't easy.
44	The Flying Jalopy	Dick Lundy	March 12, 1943
As Donald looks at the "used" planes for sale by Ben Buzzard, he takes one of the wrecked planes out for a test drive. Other appearances: Ben Buzzard
45	Fall Out Fall In	Jack King	April 23, 1943
Private Donald goes through difficult times during the training march, and later setting up his tent. Notes: Eighth World War II-themed short starring Donald, and fourth in the "Donald in the Army" series.
46	The Old Army Game	Jack King	November 5, 1943
Private Donald is caught sneaking out of camp without permission and Sergeant Pete chases after him to teach him a lesson. Other appearances: Pete Notes: Ninth World War II-themed short starring Donald, and fifth in the "Donald in the Army" series.
47	Home Defense	Jack King	December 28, 1943
During World War II, Donald is in charge of a listening post. When he mistakes a bee for an enemy plane, he calls on his nephews to fight this threat. Other appearances: Huey, Dewey and Louie, Spike the Bee Notes: Tenth World War II-themed short film starring Donald, unlike others without being propaganda or a story of Donald in the army.

=== 1944 ===
#	Title	Director	Release
48	Trombone Trouble	Jack King	February 18, 1944
During the night, Pete annoys the gods Jupiter and Vulcan (represented as ducks), as well as his neighbor Donald, with his late-night trombone sessions. The gods decide to give Donald powers to teach Pete a lesson. Other appearances: Pete, Jupiter, Vulcan
49	Donald Duck and the Gorilla	Jack King	March 31, 1944
Ajax, the killer gorilla, had escaped from the zoo, and haunts Donald and his nephews after sneaking into their home. Other appearances: Huey, Dewey and Louie, Ajax the Gorilla, Radio Host (voice)
50	Contrary Condor	Jack King	April 21, 1944
Donald, practicing as an ornithologist, is trying to collect a condor egg. When the Mother Condor returns, she mistakes him for her son. Other appearances: Mother Condor, Baby Condor, Narrator (voice)
51	Commando Duck	Jack King	June 2, 1944
Donald is ordered to destroy a Japanese airfield. Notes: Eleventh and final World War II-themed short starring Donald, and the sixth and final in the "Donald in the Army" series.
52	The Plastics Inventor	Jack King	September 1, 1944
Donald melts down plastic to build a functional homemade airplane, following the instructions of Professor Butterfield on the radio. Other appearances: Professor Butterfield (voice) Notes: This was the first Donald Duck short with opening credits.
53	Donald's Off Day	Jack Hannah	December 8, 1944
When Donald's plans to play golf on his day off are ruined by rain, he starts reading a medical book, which makes him think he may have the symptoms he reads about, and his nephews take advantage of his hypochondria to make him pranks. Other appearances: Huey, Dewey and Louie

=== 1945 ===
#	Title	Director	Release
54	The Clock Watcher	Jack King	January 26, 1945
Donald works wrapping gifts in a store, where he is constantly controlled by his boss, who speaks to him through a speaker pipe. Other appearances: Donald's Boss (voice)
55	The Eyes Have It	Jack Hannah	March 30, 1945
Donald is given some hypnotic glasses and decides to test them on Pluto. Using the glasses, he convinces Pluto that he is different animals. Other appearances: Pluto, Rooster, Chickens
56	Donald's Crime	Jack King	June 29, 1945
Donald steals the money from his nephews' piggy bank for his date with Daisy and is soon plagued by remorse. Other appearances: Huey, Dewey and Louie, Daisy Duck, Narrator (voice) Notes: Nominated for Academy Award for Best Animated Short Film.
57	Duck Pimples	Jack Kinney	August 10, 1945
Donald's imagination, influenced by scary stories on the radio and in books, leads him to a criminal world in his imagination, where he becomes involved in a jewel robbery. Other appearances: Bookseller, Dopey Davis, Agent Paddy/H. U. Hennessy, Pauline, Leslie J. Clark, J. Harold King; cameo of Ajax the Gorilla
58	Cured Duck	Jack King	October 26, 1945
Daisy is fed up with Donald's outbursts of anger, so he uses a machine to help him control himself. Other appearances: Daisy Duck Notes: This was the last appearance of Donald's shirt with buttons.
59	Old Sequoia	Jack King	December 21, 1945
Donald is a forest ranger, assigned to protect an old sequoia from a pair of beavers. Other appearances: The Beavers, Donald's Boss (voice)

=== 1946 ===
#	Title	Director	Release
60	Donald's Double Trouble	Jack King	June 28, 1946
When Daisy wants Donald to change his personality, he hires a double to make it look like he's changed for the better, but the double soon invades Donald's territory. Other appearances: Daisy Duck, Dapper Duck Notes: This was the first appearance of Donald's shirt without buttons.
61	Wet Paint	Jack King	August 9, 1946
Donald repaints his car, but has trouble with a bird that constantly makes the car dirty. Other appearances: The bird
62	Dumb Bell of the Yukon	Jack King	August 30, 1946
After reading a letter from Daisy asking him to make fur coats for her, Donald goes bear hunting. He tries to capture a little bear, but has trouble with the mother bear. Other appearances: Mother Bear, Little Bear
63	Lighthouse Keeping	Jack Hannah	September 20, 1946
Donald is a lighthouse keeper, whose light shines on a sleeping pelican, who gets angry and goes into the lighthouse to try to put out the light, which leads to a constant fight between Donald and him. Other appearances: Marblehead the Pelican

=== 1947 ===
#	Title	Director	Release
64	Straight Shooters	Jack Hannah	April 18, 1947
Donald runs a shooting gallery at the carnival. When his nephews try their luck, it turns out that Donald does not stop cheating the game. Having been deceived, they also try to deceive his uncle. Other appearances: Huey, Dewey and Louie
65	Sleepy Time Donald	Jack King	May 9, 1947
Donald sleepwalks to Daisy's house, who tries to prevent him from having an accident walking across town. Other appearances: Daisy Duck
66	Clown of the Jungle	Jack Hannah	June 20, 1947
Donald tries to take some pictures of the birds in the South American jungle, but all his attempts to photograph them are ruined by the "clown of the jungle", the Aracuan Bird. Other appearances: Aracuan Bird
67	Donald's Dilemma	Jack King	July 11, 1947
After being hit by a flower pot, Donald is convinced that he is a great singer and sings beautifully, which leads to fame, but he doesn't recognize Daisy. Other appearances: Daisy Duck, Psychologist Note: This is the first short film to use the "Donald Duck Theme Song" in the intro.
68	Bootle Beetle	Jack Hannah	August 22, 1947
A rare breed of insect, the Bootle Beetle, tells a young beetle the story of how, in his youth, Donald Duck tried to capture him. Other appearances: Bootle Beetle (debut), Young Beetle (debut)
69	Wide Open Spaces	Jack King	September 12, 1947
Unable to stay in a motel overnight, Donald sleeps in the wild, having trouble with his air mattress. Other appearances: Motel Owner
70	Chip an' Dale	Jack Hannah	November 28, 1947
Donald cuts down a tree to get firewood, unaware that the chipmunks Chip and Dale live there, and they try to get their home back by infiltrating Donald's house. Other appearances: Chip 'n' Dale (debut in a short film from the Donald Duck series, and debut under their names) Notes: Nominated for Academy Award for Best Animated Short Film.

=== 1948 ===
#	Title	Director	Release
71	Drip Dippy Donald	Jack King	March 5, 1948
Donald's sleep is interrupted by his constantly dripping kitchen faucet.
72	Daddy Duck	Jack Hannah	April 16, 1948
Donald wants to adopt a baby, and ends up adopting a kangaroo named Joey. Although Donald is happy at first, taking care of Joey is not so easy. Other appearances: Joey the Kangaroo, Adoption Bureau
73	Donald's Dream Voice	Jack King	May 21, 1948
Donald buys some voice pills, which allow him to end up speaking properly without his usual squawking. Other appearances: Daisy Duck, Burly Guy, Cow
74	The Trial of Donald Duck	Jack King	July 30, 1948
Donald is put on trial after having problems with a restaurant waiter. Other appearances: Lawyer, Judge, Monsieur Pierre
75	Inferior Decorator	Jack Hannah	August 27, 1948
As Donald decorates his house, he ends up in a confrontation with Spike the Bee. Other appearances: Spike the Bee (character's debut with his permanent appearance)
76	Soup's On	Jack Hannah	October 15, 1948
Donald cooks dinner for himself and his nephews, but sends them to their room without dinner because they haven't washed up after playing in the mud. Other appearances: Huey, Dewey and Louie
77	Three for Breakfast	Jack Hannah	November 5, 1948
Chip and Dale try to steal the pancakes that Donald has cooked. Other appearances: Chip 'n' Dale
78	Tea for Two Hundred	Jack Hannah	December 24, 1948
Donald prepares to eat at a picnic in the wild, where ants try to steal his food. Other appearances: Ants Notes: Nominated for Academy Award for Best Animated Short Film.

=== 1949 ===
#	Title	Director	Release
79	Donald's Happy Birthday	Jack Hannah	February 11, 1949
Huey, Dewey and Louie want to take the money they've saved to buy their Uncle Donald a present for his birthday, but Donald, unaware of their intentions, tries to stop them so they save the money for the future. Other appearances: Huey, Dewey and Louie
80	Sea Salts	Jack Hannah	April 8, 1949
Bootle Beetle tells audiences how he and Donald had to survive after being shipwrecked on a deserted island. Other appearances: Bootle Beetle (as "Mac")
81	Winter Storage	Jack Hannah	June 3, 1949
Chip and Dale must store acorns in their tree before winter comes. When they see Donald planting acorns in the woods, the chipmunks try to steal them. Other appearances: Chip 'n' Dale
82	Honey Harvester	Jack Hannah	August 5, 1949
Donald tries to follow Spike the Bee to find out where he stores his honey. Other appearances: Spike the Bee
83	All in a Nutshell	Jack Hannah	September 2, 1949
Donald runs a nut butter stand in the woods. Upon discovering it, Chip and Dale try to steal his jars. Other appearances: Chip 'n' Dale
84	The Greener Yard	Jack Hannah	October 14, 1949
Bootle Beetle tells the young beetle how in his youth he infiltrated Donald's garden, which began to persecute him constantly to exterminate him. Other appearances: Bootle Beetle, Young Beetle
85	Slide, Donald, Slide	Jack Hannah	November 25, 1949
Spike the Bee listens to classical music on the radio that Donald has in his backyard, but when Donald arrives, he changes the station to listen to the baseball game. Both start a fight in which they constantly change the radio station to listen to what they want. Other appearances: Spike the Bee
86	Toy Tinkers	Jack Hannah	December 16, 1949
Chip and Dale infiltrate Donald's house, where the three end up using various toys for a battle. Other appearances: Chip 'n' Dale Notes: Nominated for Academy Award for Best Animated Short Film. Also known as "Christmas Capers" in some reissues.

=== 1950 ===
#	Title	Director	Release
87	Lion Around	Jack Hannah	January 20, 1950
Huey, Dewey and Louie dress up as mountain lions to scare Donald. Donald is upset after discovering them, but when a real lion appears, Donald thinks it's another prank by his nephews again. Other appearances: Huey, Dewey and Louie, Louie the Mountain Lion (debut)
88	Crazy Over Daisy	Jack Hannah	March 18, 1950
In the 1890s, Donald is happily riding his bicycle to Daisy's, but on the way, Chip and Dale throw him into a lot of trouble. Other appearances: Chip 'n' Dale, Daisy Duck; cameos of Goofy, Mickey Mouse and Minnie Mouse
89	Hook, Lion and Sinker	Jack Hannah	April 28, 1950
Louie the lion and his son try to steal the fish that Donald has caught. Other appearances: Louie the Mountain Lion, Little Louie
90	Trailer Horn	Jack Hannah	September 1, 1950
Donald is on vacation with his trailer parked by the lake, but his peace of mind is soon interrupted by Chip and Dale. Other appearances: Chip 'n' Dale
91	Bee at the Beach	Jack Hannah	October 13, 1950
Spike the Bee happily goes to the beach, but Donald ends up being quite annoying to him. Other appearances: Spike the Bee, Sharks
92	Out on a Limb	Jack Hannah	December 15, 1950
Donald cuts the branches of the tree where Chip and Dale are. Other appearances: Chip 'n' Dale

=== 1951 ===
#	Title	Director	Release
93	Dude Duck	Jack Hannah	March 2, 1951
Donald is on vacation at a tourist ranch. After all the beautiful women have picked out the best horses, Donald ends up with Rover Boy, a horse that is disliked by Donald. Other appearances: Rover Boy
94	Corn Chips	Jack Hannah	March 21, 1951
Chip and Dale steal the popcorn that Donald has made. Other appearances: Chip 'n' Dale
95	Test Pilot Donald	Jack Hannah	June 8, 1951
Dale gets into Donald's plane and pilots it through a series of twists and turns, with Donald hanging by the tail. Other appearances: Chip 'n' Dale
96	Lucky Number	Jack Hannah	July 20, 1951
Donald, without knowing it, has the winning number from a contest where he won a car, and his nephews are going to claim it as a surprise for their uncle. Other appearances: Huey, Dewey and Louie
97	Out of Scale	Jack Hannah	November 2, 1951
Donald has a model of a train and a city in his garden. He decides to move a tree in his path that doesn't match the scale of the model, not realizing that it is Chip and Dale's home. Other appearances: Chip 'n' Dale
98	Bee on Guard	Jack Hannah	December 14, 1951
Donald sees bees in his garden and follows them to the hive for honey. The bee guarding the hive won't let him through, so Donald dresses up as a bee. Other appearances: Bee Guard

=== 1952 ===
#	Title	Director	Release
99	Donald Applecore	Jack Hannah	January 18, 1952
Donald is a farmer of apples, which have been nibbled by Chip and Dale. Other appearances: Chip 'n' Dale
100	Let's Stick Together	Jack Hannah	April 25, 1952
An old Spiker recounts how he and Donald were partners in the past, holding various jobs thanks to the use of Spike's stinger. Other appearances: Spike the Bee, Spike's Wife
101	Uncle Donald's Ants	Jack Hannah	July 18, 1952
Donald spills some sugar on his sidewalk, and soon the ants have complete control of his house. Other appearances: Ants
102	Trick or Treat	Jack Hannah	October 10, 1952
On Halloween night, Donald isn't willing to give his nephews candy, so Witch Hazel offers her help to teach Donald a lesson. Other appearances: Huey, Dewey and Louie, Witch Hazel, Beelzebub, Ghosts

=== 1953 ===
#	Title	Director	Release
103	Don's Fountain of Youth	Jack Hannah	May 30, 1953
Donald pretends to have become a baby by drinking from a fountain of youth to play a prank on his nephews. Other appearances: Huey, Dewey and Louie, Crocodile, Baby Crocodiles
104	The New Neighbor	Jack Hannah	August 1, 1953
After moving into his new house, Donald begins to have problems with his new neighbor, Pete, who turns out to be quite annoying. Other appearances: Pete, Muncey
105	Rugged Bear	Jack Hannah	October 23, 1953
Humphrey the Bear hides in Donald's cabin, pretending to be the bearskin rug. Other appearances: Humphrey the Bear (character's debut in a short film from the Donald Duck series) Notes: Nominated for Academy Award for Best Animated Short Film.
106	Working for Peanuts	Jack Hannah	November 11, 1953
Chip and Dale try to steal Dolores the Elephant's peanuts at the zoo, and Donald, her keeper, tries to stop them. Other appearances: Chip 'n' Dale, Dolores the Elephant; cameos of Humphrey the Bear and Salty the Seal Notes: First and only Donald Duck cartoon released in 3D.
107	Canvas Back Duck	Jack Hannah	December 25, 1953
Donald confronts boxer Peewee Pete in a carnival ring. Other appearances: Huey, Dewey and Louie, Pete (as "Peewee Pete")

=== 1954 ===
#	Title	Director	Release
108	Spare the Rod	Jack Hannah	January 15, 1954
Donald's nephews play instead of chopping wood. A little teacher named "Child Psychologist" appears as Donald's conscience telling him to use the game as reinforcement for the children to do their homework, something that doesn't favor Donald when he mistakes three cannibals for his nephews. Other appearances: Huey, Dewey and Louie, Child Psychologist, Pygmy Cannibals
109	Donald's Diary	Jack Kinney	February 13, 1954
Donald recounts in his diary his love story with Daisy. Other appearances: Daisy Duck, Daisy's Brothers (played by Huey, Dewey and Louie), Daisy's Mother, Daisy's Father
110	Dragon Around	Jack Hannah	July 16, 1954
Donald drives a steam shovel with which he tries to cut down Chip 'n' Dale's tree, who mistake the steam shovel for a dragon. Other appearances: Chip 'n' Dale
111	Grin and Bear It	Jack Hannah	August 13, 1954
Donald Duck arrives at Brownstone National Park, where Humphrey tries to get Donald's ham. Other appearances: Humphrey the Bear, J. Audubon Woodlore (debut), Brownstone Bears
112	The Flying Squirrel	Jack Hannah	November 12, 1954
Donald Duck has a peanut cart in a park, where a flying squirrel ends up in a battle with him for the peanuts. Other appearances: The Flying Squirrel
113	Grand Canyonscope	C. August Nichols	December 23, 1954
Donald visits the Grand Canyon, where he is constantly berated by J. Audubon Woodlore for breaking the rules of the place. Other appearances: J. Audubon Woodlore, Louie the Mountain Lion Notes: First Donald Duck cartoon filmed in CinemaScope.

=== 1955 ===
#	Title	Director	Release
114	No Hunting	Jack Hannah	January 14, 1955
Donald, possessed by the spirit of his grandfather, a pioneer hunter, decides to participate in the hunting season. Other appearances: Donald's grandfather; cameos of Bambi and his mother Notes: Nominated for Academy Award for Best Animated Short Film.
115	Bearly Asleep	Jack Hannah	August 19, 1955
Humphrey is thrown out of the cave by the other bears due to his snoring. Seeking refuge, he ends up at Donald's house. Other appearances: Humphrey the Bear, Brownstone Bears
116	Beezy Bear	Jack Hannah	September 2, 1955
Donald is a beekeeper, and Humphrey the Bear tries to steal his honey. Other appearances: Humphrey the Bear, J. Audubon Woodlore, Brownstone Bears; cameo of Spike the Bee in the title screen
117	Up a Tree	Jack Hannah	September 23, 1955
Donald is a lumberjack, but the tree he has to chop down turns out to be Chip and Dale's home. Other appearances: Chip 'n' Dale

=== 1956 ===
#	Title	Director	Release
118	Chips Ahoy	Jack Kinney	February 24, 1956
Chip and Dale take Donald's model ship to sail to an island where there is a tree with acorns on it. Other appearances: Chip 'n' Dale

=== 1961 ===
#	Title	Director	Release
119	The Litterbug	Hamilton Luske	June 21, 1961
Donald is used as an example of various types of litterbugs. Other appearances: Narrator (voice); cameo of Huey, Dewey and Louie

=== 2024 ===
#	Title	Director	Release
120	D.I.Y. Duck	Mark Henn	June 9, 2024
Donald tries his hand at some home repairs but finds himself unable to control his temper. Notes: This cartoon uses classic archive audio clips of Donald provided from voice actor Clarence Nash by paying tribute to him.

== Donald Duck Presents ==
Title screen for Donald Duck Presents

Donald Duck Presents is an American animated television series that aired on The Disney Channel beginning in 1983 and which featured Disney animated shorts. Although Donald Duck shorts were the primary programming, additional cartoons featuring Goofy, Mickey Mouse, Chip 'n' Dale, Pluto, as well as Silly Symphonies, Disney featurettes, and other Disney-based shorts were shown. The show was first aired on September 1, 1983, a few months after The Disney Channel was launched. Its timeslot for its early run was at 8 a.m. Eastern/Pacific Time, making it the third program of The Disney Channel's 16 (later 18) hour programming day.

Brief clips and segues featuring Donald Duck typically were placed between each short. The shorts often were edited down, removing the opening and closing credits, and in some cases, edited for length. The opening of the show featured a cavalcade of scenes from Disney shorts, and a theme song. Unlike the opening of Good Morning, Mickey!, which features clips of several characters in the theme, the opening of Donald Duck Presents focuses on clips featuring Donald. The show was replaced by Donald's Quack Attack in 1992.

== Home media ==
The films have been released in various forms of home media, with selected films released on VHS, laserdisc, and DVD. Starting in 2010, some of the cartoons were made available on the iTunes Store as digital downloads.

The only complete re-release of the entire series has been in the "Walt Disney Treasures" DVD sets. The vast majority of the series appears between four two-disc sets: "The Chronological Donald, Volume One" (2004), "The Chronological Donald, Volume Two" (2005), "The Chronological Donald, Volume Three" (2007), and "The Chronological Donald, Volume Four" (2008). The sets also include several short films starring Donald outside of the Donald Duck series, such as The Wise Little Hen (1934) from the Silly Symphony series, Donald and Pluto (1936) from the Mickey Mouse series, all the shorts in the Donald & Goofy series, and several propaganda, educational, and commercial films starring Donald. Two shorts of the Donald Duck series, Der Fuehrer's Face (1943) and The Spirit of '43 (1943), are not present in the sets of "The Chronological Donald", instead being included in the "Walt Disney on the Front Lines" set (2004), which also included other World War II-themed Donald Duck shorts.

== See also ==
- Donald Duck filmography
- List of Walt Disney Animation Studios short films
- Silly Symphony
  - The Wise Little Hen
- Mickey Mouse (film series)
  - Donald and Pluto
- Pluto (film series)
- Goofy (film series)
- Mickey Mouse Works
