= List of animated short films of the 1950s =

Films are sorted by year and then alphabetically. They include theatrical, television, and direct-to-video films with less than 40 minutes runtime. For a list of films with over 40 minutes of runtime, see List of animated feature films of the 1950s.

== 1950 ==
Name	Country	Technique
8 Ball Bunny	United States	Traditional Animation
All a Bir-r-r-d	United States	Traditional Animation
Anti-Cats	United States	Traditional Animation
Baby Wants Spinach	United States	Traditional Animation
Beach Peach	United States	Traditional Animation
Beauty on the Beach	United States	Traditional Animation
The Beauty Shop	United States	Traditional Animation
Bee at the Beach	United States	Traditional Animation
Big House Bunny	United States	Traditional Animation
Blue Hawaii	United States	Traditional Animation
Boobs in the Woods	United States	Traditional Animation
Boos in the Nite	United States	Traditional Animation
The Brave Engineer	United States	Traditional Animation
Bunker Hill Bunny	United States	Traditional Animation
Bushy Hare	United States	Traditional Animation
Bungled Bungalow	United States	Traditional Animation
Camp Dog	United States	Traditional Animation
Casper's Spree Under the Sea	United States	Traditional Animation
Caveman Inki	United States	Traditional Animation
The Chump Champ	United States	Traditional Animation
Crazy Over Daisy	United States	Traditional Animation
The Cuckoo Clock	United States	Traditional Animation
Cue Ball Cat	United States	Traditional Animation
Detouring Thru Maine	United States	Traditional Animation
Dog Collared	United States	Traditional Animation
Dog Gone South	United States	Traditional Animation
A Doll's Dream	Norway	Live-action/stop-motion
Dream Walking	United States	Traditional Animation
The Ducksters	United States	Traditional Animation
An Egg Scramble	United States	Traditional Animation
The Farmer and the Belle	United States	Traditional Animation
Fiesta Time	United States	Traditional Animation
Food for Feudin'	United States	Traditional Animation
A Fractured Leghorn	United States	Traditional Animation
The Framed Cat	United States	Traditional Animation
Fresh Yeggs	United States	Traditional Animation
Garden Gopher	United States	Traditional Animation
Gerald McBoing-Boing	United States	Traditional Animation
Giddyap	United States	Traditional Animation
Gobs of Fun	United States	Traditional Animation
Golden Yeggs	United States	Traditional Animation
Goofy Goofy Gander	United States	Traditional Animation
Gym Jam	United States	Traditional Animation
Helter Swelter	United States	Traditional Animation
Heap Hep Injuns	United States	Traditional Animation
Hillbilly Hare	United States	Traditional Animation
His Bitter Half	United States	Traditional Animation
Hold That Pose	United States	Traditional Animation
Home, Tweet Home	United States	Traditional Animation
Homeless Hare	United States	Traditional Animation
Hook, Lion and Sinker	United States	Traditional Animation
How Green Is My Spinach	United States	Traditional Animation
Hurdy-Gurdy Hare	United States	Traditional Animation
The Hypo-Chondri-Cat	United States	Traditional Animation
It's Hummer Time	United States	Traditional Animation
Jerry and the Lion	United States	Traditional Animation
Jingle Jangle Jungle	United States	Traditional Animation
Jitterbug Jive	United States	Traditional Animation
Land of the Lost Jewels	United States	Traditional Animation
Law and Order	United States	Traditional Animation
The Leghorn Blows at Midnight	United States	Traditional Animation
The Lion's Busy	United States	Traditional Animation
Little Quacker	United States	Traditional Animation
Mice Meeting You	United States	Traditional Animation
The Miner's Daughter	United States	Traditional Animation
Morris the Midget Moose	United States	Traditional Animation
Mother Goose's Birthday Party	United States	Traditional Animation
Motor Mania	United States	Traditional Animation
Mutiny on the Bunny	United States	Traditional Animation
Once Upon a Rhyme	United States	Traditional Animation
Out on a Limb	United States	Traditional Animation
Pests of the West	United States	Traditional Animation
Pleased to Eat You	United States	Traditional Animation
Pluto and the Gopher	United States	Traditional Animation
Pluto's Heart Throb	United States	Traditional Animation
Pop 'im Pop!	United States	Traditional Animation
Popeye Makes a Movie	United States	Traditional Animation
Primitive Pluto	United States	Traditional Animation
Punchy De Leon	United States	Traditional Animation
Puny Express	United States	Traditional Animation
Puss Cafe	United States	Traditional Animation
Quack-a-Doodle-Doo	United States	Traditional Animation
Quick on the Vigor	United States	Traditional Animation
Rabbit of Seville	United States	Traditional Animation
Riot in Rhythm	United States	Traditional Animation
Rodney	United States	Traditional Animation
Safety Second	United States	Traditional Animation
Saturday Evening Puss	United States	Traditional Animation
Saved by the Bell	United States	Traditional Animation
The Scarlet Pumpernickel	United States	Traditional Animation
Short'nin' Bread	United States	Traditional Animation
Sock-a-Bye Kitty	United States	Traditional Animation
Spellbound Hound	United States	Traditional Animation
Stooge for a Mouse	United States	Traditional Animation
Strife with Father	United States	Traditional Animation
Tarts and Flowers	United States	Traditional Animation
Teacher's Pest	United States	Traditional Animation
Texas Tom	United States	Traditional Animation
Tom and Jerry in the Hollywood Bowl	United States	Traditional Animation
Trailer Horn	United States	Traditional Animation
Trouble Indemity	United States	Traditional Animation
Two's a Crowd	United States	Traditional Animation
Ups an' Downs Derby	United States	Traditional Animation
Ventriloquist Cat	United States	Traditional Animation
The Voice of the Turkey	United States	Traditional Animation
What's Up, Doc?	United States	Traditional Animation
Wide Open Spaces	United States	Traditional Animation
Win, Place and Show Boat	United States	Traditional Animation

== 1951 ==
Name	Country	Technique
Alpine for You	United States	Traditional Animation
As the Crow Lies	United States	Traditional Animation
Audrey the Rainmaker	United States	Traditional Animation
Ballot Box Bunny	United States	Traditional Animation
Barefaced Flatfoot	United States	Traditional Animation
Big Top Bunny	United States	Traditional Animation
Boo Hoo Baby	United States	Traditional Animation
Boo Scout	United States	Traditional Animation
Bunny Hugged	United States	Traditional Animation
By Leaps and Hounds	United States	Traditional Animation
Canned Feud	United States	Traditional Animation
Car of Tomorrow	United States	Traditional Animation
Casanova Cat	United States	Traditional Animation
Casper Comes to Clown	United States	Traditional Animation
Casper Takes a Bow-wow	United States	Traditional Animation
Cat-Choo	United States	Traditional Animation
Cat Napping	United States	Traditional Animation
Cat Tamale	United States	Traditional Animation
Cheers for Chubby	United States	Traditional Animation
Chicken in the Rough	United States	Traditional Animation
Chow Hound	United States	Traditional Animation
Cock-a-Doodle Dog	United States	Traditional Animation
Cold Storage	United States	Traditional Animation
Cold Turkey	United States	Traditional Animation
Cold War	United States	Traditional Animation
Daredevil Droopy	United States	Traditional Animation
Destination Meatball	United States	Traditional Animation
Double-Cross-Country Race	United States	Traditional Animation
Drip-Along Daffy	United States	Traditional Animation
Drippy Mississippi	United States	Traditional Animation
Droopy's Good Deed	United States	Traditional Animation
Droopy's Double Trouble	United States	Traditional Animation
The Fair-Haired Hare	United States	Traditional Animation
Fathers Are People	United States	Traditional Animation
French Rarebit	United States	Traditional Animation
Frosty the Snowman	United States	Traditional Animation
Fuddy Duddy Buddy	United States	Traditional Animation
Get Rich Quick	United States	Traditional Animation
Good Wrinkles	United States	Traditional Animation
Grizzly Golfer	United States	Traditional Animation
Hare We Go	United States	Traditional Animation
His Hare-Raising Tale	United States	Traditional Animation
His Mouse Friday	United States	Traditional Animation
Hold the Lion Please	United States	Traditional Animation
Home Made Home	United States	Traditional Animation
Jerry and the Goldfish	United States	Traditional Animation
Jerry's Cousin	United States	Traditional Animation
Lambert the Sheepish Lion	United States	Traditional Animation
Land of Lost Watches	United States	Traditional Animation
Let's Stalk Spinach	United States	Traditional Animation
Lion Down	United States	Traditional Animation
Mice Paradise	United States	Traditional Animation
Nit-Witty Kitty	United States	Traditional Animation
No Smoking	United States	Traditional Animation
One Quack Mind	United States	Traditional Animation
Out of Scale	United States	Traditional Animation
Party Smarty	United States	Traditional Animation
The Peachy Cobbler	United States	Traditional Animation
Peter Cottontail	United States	Traditional Animation
Pilgrim Popeye	United States	Traditional Animation
Plutopia	United States	Traditional Animation
The Prize Pest	United States	Traditional Animation
Punch and Judo	United States	Traditional Animation
Putty Tat Trouble	United States	Traditional Animation
Rabbit Every Monday	United States	Traditional Animation
Rabbit Fire	United States	Traditional Animation
R'coon Dawg	United States	Traditional Animation
The Redwood Sap	United States	Traditional Animation
Room and Bird	United States	Traditional Animation
Rooty Toot Toot	United States	Traditional Animation
Scent-imental Romeo	United States	Traditional Animation
Scout Fellow	United States	Traditional Animation
Sing Again of Michigan	United States	Traditional Animation
Sleep Happy	United States	Traditional Animation
Sleepy-Time Tom	United States	Traditional Animation
Slicked-up Pup	United States	Traditional Animation
Slingshot 6 7/8	United States	Traditional Animation
Slip Us Some Redskin	United States	Traditional Animation
Snooze Reel	United States	Traditional Animation
Songs of Erin	United States	Traditional Animation
Spring Fever	United States	Traditional Animation
Symphony in Slang	United States	Traditional Animation
Thrill of Fair	United States	Traditional Animation
To Boo or Not to Boo	United States	Traditional Animation
Tomorrow We Diet!	United States	Traditional Animation
Tweet Music	United States	Traditional Animation
Tweet Tweet Tweety	United States	Traditional Animation
Tweety's S.O.S.	United States	Traditional Animation
The Two Mouseketeers	United States	Traditional Animation
Vacation with Play	United States	Traditional Animation
Vegetable Vaudeville	United States	Traditional Animation
The Wearing of the Grin	United States	Traditional Animation
Wicket Wacky	United States	Traditional Animation
The Woody Woodpecker Polka	United States	Traditional Animation

== 1952 ==
Name	Country	Technique
14 Carrot Rabbit	United States	Traditional Animation
Ain't She Tweet	United States	Traditional Animation
The Awful Tooth	United States	Traditional Animation
Bee on Guard	United States	Traditional Animation
Beep, Beep	United States	Traditional Animation
Big Bad Sindbad	United States	Traditional Animation
A Bird in a Guilty Cage	United States	Traditional Animation
Born to Peck	United States	Traditional Animation
Busybody Bear	United States	Traditional Animation
Caballero Droopy	United States	Traditional Animation
The Case of the Cockeyed Canary	United States	Traditional Animation
Cage Fright	United States	Traditional Animation
Cat Carson Rides Again	United States	Traditional Animation
City Kitty	United States	Traditional Animation
Clown on the Farm	United States	Traditional Animation
Corn Chips	United States	Traditional Animation
Cracked Quack	United States	Traditional Animation
Cruise Cat	United States	Traditional Animation
The Deep Boo Sea	United States	Traditional Animation
Dizzy Dinosaurs	United States	Traditional Animation
The Dog House	United States	Traditional Animation
Donald Applecore	United States	Traditional Animation
The Duck Doctor	United States	Traditional Animation
Dude Duck	United States	Traditional Animation
The EGGcited Rooster	United States	Traditional Animation
Father's Lion	United States	Traditional Animation
Feast and Furious	United States	Traditional Animation
Feed the Kitty	United States	Traditional Animation
Fit to Be Tied	United States	Traditional Animation
Flat Foot Fledgling	United States	Traditional Animation
The Flying Cat	United States	Traditional Animation
Fool Coverage	United States	Traditional Animation
Foolish Duckling	United States	Traditional Animation
Forest Fantasy	United States	Traditional Animation
Foxy by Proxy	United States	Traditional Animation
Friend or Phony	United States	Traditional Animation
Fun at the Fair	United States	Traditional Animation
Gag and Baggage	United States	Traditional Animation
Ghost of the Town	United States	Traditional Animation
Gift Wrapped	United States	Traditional Animation
Going! Going! Gosh!	United States	Traditional Animation
The Great Who-Dood-It	United States	Traditional Animation
Hare Lift	United States	Traditional Animation
The Hasty Hare	United States	Traditional Animation
Hello Aloha	United States	Traditional Animation
Hoppy Go Lucky	United States	Traditional Animation
How to Be a Detective	United States	Traditional Animation
Kiddin' the Kitten	United States	Traditional Animation
Law and Audrey	United States	Traditional Animation
Let's Stick Together	United States	Traditional Animation
The Little House	United States	Traditional Animation
Little Beau Pepé	United States	Traditional Animation
Little Red Rodent Hood	United States	Traditional Animation
Little Runaway	United States	Traditional Animation
The Little Wise Quacker	United States	Traditional Animation
Lucky Number	United States	Traditional Animation
Lunch with a Punch	United States	Traditional Animation
Madeline	United States	Traditional Animation
Magical Maestro	United States	Traditional Animation
Man's Best Friend	United States	Traditional Animation
Mice-Capades	United States	Traditional Animation
Mouse-Warming	United States	Traditional Animation
Neighbours	Canada	Live-action/stop-motion
Off We Glow	United States	Traditional Animation
Oily Hare	United States	Traditional Animation
One Cab's Family	United States	Traditional Animation
Operation: Rabbit	United States	Traditional Animation
Out of Scale	United States	Traditional Animation
Pig-a-Boo	United States	Traditional Animation
Pink and Blue Blues	United States	Traditional Animation
Pluto's Christmas Tree	United States	Traditional Animation
Pluto's Party	United States	Traditional Animation
Popalong Popeye	United States	Traditional Animation
Popeye's Pappy	United States	Traditional Animation
Push-Button Kitty	United States	Traditional Animation
Rabbit Seasoning	United States	Traditional Animation
Rabbit's Kin	United States	Traditional Animation
Rock-a-Bye Bear	United States	Traditional Animation
The Romance of Transportation in Canada	Canada	Traditional Animation
Scalp Treatment	United States	Traditional Animation
Shuteye Popeye	United States	Traditional Animation
Sink or Swim	United States	Traditional Animation
Smitten Kitten	United States	Traditional Animation
Sock a Doodle Do	United States	Traditional Animation
Spunky Skunky	United States	Traditional Animation
Stage Hoax	United States	Traditional Animation
The Super Snooper	United States	Traditional Animation
Susie the Little Blue Coupe	United States	Traditional Animation
Swimmer Take All	United States	Traditional Animation
Teachers Are People	United States	Traditional Animation
Termites from Mars	United States	Traditional Animation
Terrier Stricken	United States	Traditional Animation
Test Pilot Donald	United States	Traditional Animation
Thumb Fun	United States	Traditional Animation
Tots of Fun	United States	Traditional Animation
Tree for Two	United States	Traditional Animation
Trick or Treat	United States	Traditional Animation
Triplet Trouble	United States	Traditional Animation
True Boo	United States	Traditional Animation
The Turn-Tale Wolf	United States	Traditional Animation
Two Chips and a Miss	United States	Traditional Animation
Two-Gun Goofy	United States	Traditional Animation
Two Weeks Vacation	United States	Traditional Animation
Uncle Donald's Ants	United States	Traditional Animation
Water, Water Every Hare	United States	Traditional Animation
Who's Kitten Who?	United States	Traditional Animation
Woodpecker in the Rough	United States	Traditional Animation

== 1953 ==
Name	Country	Technique
A Is for Atom	United States	Traditional Animation
Aero-Nutics	United States	Traditional Animation
Ancient Fistory	United States	Traditional Animation
Baby Wants a Battle	United States	Traditional Animation
Barney's Hungry Cousin	United States	Traditional Animation
Belle Boys	United States	Traditional Animation
Ben and Me	United States	Traditional Animation
Better Bait Than Never	United States	Traditional Animation
Boos and Saddles	United States	Traditional Animation
Buccaneer Woodpecker	United States	Traditional Animation
Bully for Bugs	United States	Traditional Animation
By the Old Mill Scream	United States	Traditional Animation
Canvas Back Duck	United States	Traditional Animation
Cat-Tails for Two	United States	Traditional Animation
Catty Cornered	United States	Traditional Animation
Child Sockology	United States	Traditional Animation
Christopher Crumpet	United States	Traditional Animation
Cobs and Robbers	United States	Traditional Animation
Do or Diet	United States	Traditional Animation
Don's Fountain of Youth	United States	Traditional Animation
Don't Give Up the Sheep	United States	Traditional Animation
Drinks on the Mouse	United States	Traditional Animation
Duck Amuck	United States	Traditional Animation
Duck Dodgers in the 24½th Century	United States	Traditional Animation
Duck! Rabbit, Duck!	United States	Traditional Animation
Father's Day Off	United States	Traditional Animation
Father's Week-end	United States	Traditional Animation
Featherweight Champ	United States	Traditional Animation
Firemen's Brawl	United States	Traditional Animation
Football Now and Then	United States	Traditional Animation
Frightday the 13th	United States	Traditional Animation
From A to Z-Z-Z-Z	United States	Traditional Animation
For Whom the Bulls Toil	United States	Traditional Animation
Forward March Hare	United States	Traditional Animation
Fowl Weather	United States	Traditional Animation
Gerald McBoing Boing's Symphony	United States	Traditional Animation
Half-Pint Palomino	United States	Traditional Animation
Hare Trimmed	United States	Traditional Animation
Heir Bear	United States	Traditional Animation
Herman the Catoonist	United States	Traditional Animation
Hot Noon (or 12 O'Clock for Sure)	United States	Traditional Animation
How to Dance	United States	Traditional Animation
How to Sleep	United States	Traditional Animation
Huey's Ducky Daddy	United States	Traditional Animation
Hypnotic Hick	United States	Traditional Animation
Hysterical History	United States	Traditional Animation
Invention Convention	United States	Traditional Animation
Jerry and Jumbo	United States	Traditional Animation
Johann Mouse	United States	Traditional Animation
Just Ducky	United States	Traditional Animation
Life with Tom	United States	Traditional Animation
Little Boo Peep	United States	Traditional Animation
Little Johnny Jet	United States	Traditional Animation
Lumber Jack-Rabbit	United States	Traditional Animation
Melody	United States	Traditional Animation
The Missing Mouse	United States	Traditional Animation
A Mouse Divided	United States	Traditional Animation
Muscle Tussle	United States	Traditional Animation
The New Neighbor	United States	Traditional Animation
No Place Like Rome	United States	Traditional Animation
North Pal	United States	Traditional Animation
Northwest Mousie	United States	Traditional Animation
Of Mice and Magic	United States	Traditional Animation
Operation Sawdust	United States	Traditional Animation
The Orphan Egg	United States	Traditional Animation
Philharmaniacs	United States	Traditional Animation
Plop Goes the Weasel	United States	Traditional Animation
Popeye, the Ace of Space	United States	Traditional Animation
Popeye's Mirthday	United States	Traditional Animation
Punch Trunk	United States	Traditional Animation
Robot Rabbit	United States	Traditional Animation
Rugged Bear	United States	Traditional Animation
Shaving Muggs	United States	Traditional Animation
The Simple Things	United States	Traditional Animation
Snow Business	United States	Traditional Animation
Southern Fried Rabbit	United States	Traditional Animation
Spare the Rod	United States	Traditional Animation
Spook No Evil	United States	Sweet Frog
Starting from Hatch	United States	Traditional Animation
A Street Cat Named Sylvester	United States	Traditional Animation
Surf Bored	United States	Traditional Animation
The Tell-Tale Heart	United States	Traditional Animation
That's My Pup!	United States	Traditional Animation
The Three Little Pups	United States	Live-action/traditional
The Timid Scarecrow	United States	Traditional Animation
Tom Tom Tomcat	United States	Traditional Animation
Toot, Whistle, Plunk and Boom	United States	Traditional Animation
Toreadorable	United States	Traditional Animation
T.V. of Tomorrow	United States	Traditional Animation
Two Little Indians	United States	Traditional Animation
The Unicorn in the Garden	United States	Traditional Animation
Upswept Hare	United States	Traditional Animation
Wee-Willie Wildcat	United States	Traditional Animation
What's Sweepin'	United States	Traditional Animation
When Mousehood Was in Flower	United States	Traditional Animation
Wild Over You	United States	Traditional Animation
Winner by a Hare	United States	Traditional Animation
Wise Quacks	United States	Traditional Animation
Working for Peanuts	United States	Traditional Animation
Wrestling Wrecks	United States	Traditional Animation
Zipping Along	United States	Traditional Animation

== 1954 ==
Name	Country	Technique
Alley to Bali	United States	Traditional Animation
Baby Buggy Bunny	United States	Traditional Animation
Baby Butch	United States	Traditional Animation
Bell Hoppy	United States	Traditional Animation
Bewitched Bunny	United States	Traditional Animation
Billy Boy	United States	Traditional Animation
Bird-Brain Bird Dog	United States	Traditional Animation
Boo Moon	United States	Traditional Animation
Boo Ribbon Winner	United States	Traditional Animation
Boos and Arrows	United States	Traditional Animation
Bride and Gloom	United States	Traditional Animation
Bugs and Thugs	United States	Traditional Animation
By Word of Mouse	United States	Traditional Animation
Candy Cabaret	United States	Traditional Animation
Captain Hareblower	United States	Traditional Animation
Casey Bats Again	United States	Traditional Animation
Casper Genie	United States	Traditional Animation
Claws for Alarm	United States	Traditional Animation
Convict Concerto	United States	Traditional Animation
Crazy Mixed Up Pup	United States	Traditional Animation
Crazytown	United States	Traditional Animation
Design for Leaving	United States	Traditional Animation
Devil May Hare	United States	Traditional Animation
Dixieland Droopy	United States	Traditional Animation
Dog Pounded	United States	Traditional Animation
Donald's Diary	United States	Traditional Animation
Downhearted Duckling	United States	Traditional Animation
Dr. Jerkyl's Hide	United States	Traditional Animation
Drag-a-Long Droopy	United States	Traditional Animation
Dragon Around	United States	Traditional Animation
The Farm of Tomorrow	United States	Traditional Animation
Feline Frame-Up	United States	Traditional Animation
Fido Beta Kappa	United States	Traditional Animation
A Fine Feathered Frenzy	United States	Traditional Animation
The Flea Circus	United States	Traditional Animation
Floor Flusher	United States	Traditional Animation
The Flying Squirrel	United States	Traditional Animation
Fowl Weather	United States	Traditional Animation
Fright to the Finish	United States	Traditional Animation
Fudget's Budget	United States	Traditional Animation
Gone Batty	United States	Traditional Animation
Goo Goo Goliath	United States	Traditional Animation
Gopher Spinach	United States	Traditional Animation
Grand Canyonscope	United States	Traditional Animation
Greek Mirthology	United States	Traditional Animation
Grin and Bear It	United States	Traditional Animation
Hair Today Gone Tomorrow	United States	Traditional Animation
Hic-cup Pup	United States	Traditional Animation
Homesteader Droopy	United States	Traditional Animation
Hot Rod Huckster	United States	Traditional Animation
How Now Boing Boing	United States	Traditional Animation
The Impossible Possum	United States	Traditional Animation
Little Boy Boo	United States	Traditional Animation
Little School Mouse	United States	Traditional Animation
The Lone Chipmunks	United States	Traditional Animation
Mice Follies	United States	Traditional Animation
Muzzle Tough	United States	Traditional Animation
My Little Duckaroo	United States	Traditional Animation
Neapolitan Mouse	United States	Traditional Animation
No Ifs, Ands or Butts	United States	Traditional Animation
No Parking Hare	United States	Traditional Animation
Of Mice and Menace	United States	Traditional Animation
The Oily Bird	United States	Traditional Animation
Pet Peeve	United States	Traditional Animation
Pigs Is Pigs	United States	Traditional Animation
Popeye's 20th Anniversary	United States	Traditional Animation
Posse Cat	United States	Traditional Animation
Private Eye Popeye	United States	Traditional Animation
Puppy Tale	United States	Traditional Animation
Puss 'n Boos	United States	Traditional Animation
Quack Shot	United States	Traditional Animation
Rail-Rodents	United States	Traditional Animation
Real Gone Woody	United States	Traditional Animation
Satan's Waitin'	United States	Traditional Animation
The Seapreme Court	United States	Traditional Animation
Sheep Ahoy	United States	Traditional Animation
Sh-h-h-h-h-h	United States	Traditional Animation
Ship A-Hooey	United States	Traditional Animation
Sleepy-Time Squirrel	United States	Traditional Animation
Social Lion	United States	Traditional Animation
Socko in Morocco	United States	Traditional Animation
Spare the Rod	United States	Traditional Animation
Stop! Look! And Hasten!	United States	Traditional Animation
Surf and Sound	United States	Traditional Animation
Taxi-Turvy	United States	Traditional Animation
Touché, Pussy Cat!	United States	Traditional Animation
Two for the Record	United States	Traditional Animation
Under the Counter Spy	United States	Traditional Animation
When Magoo Flew	United States	Traditional Animation
Yankee Doodle Bugs	United States	Traditional Animation
Zero the Hero	United States	Traditional Animation

== 1955 ==
Name	Country	Technique
Barnyard Actor	United States	Traditional Animation
Beanstalk Bunny	United States	Traditional Animation
Bearly Asleep	United States	Traditional Animation
Beaus Will Be Beaus	United States	Traditional Animation
Beezy Bear	United States	Traditional Animation
A Bicep Built for Two	United States	Traditional Animation
Blinkity Blank	Canada	Drawn-on-film Animation
Boo Kind to Animals	United States	Traditional Animation
Bull Fright	United States	Traditional Animation
Car-azy Drivers	United States	Traditional Animation
Cellbound	United States	Traditional Animation
Contrasts in Rhythm	United States	Traditional Animation
Cookin' with Gags	United States	Traditional Animation
Cops Is Tops	United States	Traditional Animation
Deputy Droopy	United States	Traditional Animation
Designs on Jerry	United States	Traditional Animation
Dime to Retire	United States	Traditional Animation
Dixieland Droopy	United States	Traditional Animation
Dizzy Dishes	United States	Traditional Animation
Feather Dusted	United States	Traditional Animation
Field and Scream	United States	Traditional Animation
The First Bad Man	United States	Traditional Animation
Gift of Gag	United States	Traditional Animation
Git Along Li'l Duckie	United States	Traditional Animation
Good Will to Men	United States	Traditional Animation
Guided Muscle	United States	Traditional Animation
Gumbasia	United States	Stop-motion Animation
Hare Brush	United States	Traditional Animation
Helter Shelter	United States	Traditional Animation
Heir-Conditioned	United States	Traditional Animation
Hide and Shriek	United States	Traditional Animation
Hyde and Hare	United States	Traditional Animation
A Job for a Gob	United States	Traditional Animation
Jumpin' Jupiter	United States	Traditional Animation
Keep Your Grin Up	United States	Traditional Animation
Kitty Cornered	United States	Traditional Animation
Knight-mare Hare	United States	Traditional Animation
The Legend of Rockabye Point	United States	Traditional Animation
Lighthouse Mouse	United States	Traditional Animation
Little Audrey Riding Hood	United States	Traditional Animation
Mister and Mistletoe	United States	Traditional Animation
Mouse for Sale	United States	Traditional Animation
Mouse Trapeze	United States	Traditional Animation
Mousieur Herman	United States	Traditional Animation
News Hound	United States	Traditional Animation
No Hunting	United States	Traditional Animation
Nurse to Meet Ya	United States	Traditional Animation
One Froggy Evening	United States	Traditional Animation
Pappy's Puppy	United States	Traditional Animation
Pecos Pest	United States	Traditional Animation
Penny Antics	United States	Traditional Animation
Poop Goes the Weasel	United States	Traditional Animation
Pup on a Picnic	United States	Traditional Animation
Rabbit Punch	United States	Traditional Animation
Rabbit Rampage	United States	Traditional Animation
Ready, Set, Zoom!	United States	Traditional Animation
Red Riding Hoodwinked	United States	Traditional Animation
Red White and Boo	United States	Traditional Animation
Robin Rodenthood	United States	Traditional Animation
Roman Legion-Hare	United States	Traditional Animation
Sandy Claws	United States	Traditional Animation
Sahara Hare	United States	Traditional Animation
Show Biz Bugs	United States	Traditional Animation
Smarty Cat	United States	Traditional Animation
Southbound Duckling	United States	Traditional Animation
Speedy Gonzales	United States	Traditional Animation
Spooking with a Brogue	United States	Traditional Animation
Stork Naked	United States	Traditional Animation
That's My Mommy	United States	Traditional Animation
This Is a Life?	United States	Traditional Animation
Tom and Chérie	United States	Traditional Animation
Tweety's Circus	United States	Traditional Animation
Up a Tree	United States	Traditional Animation

== 1956 ==
Name	Country	Technique
Assault and Flattery	United States	Traditional Animation
Barbary Coast Bunny	United States	Traditional Animation
Barbecue Brawl	United States	Traditional Animation
Blue Cat Blues	United States	Traditional Animation
Broom-Stick Bunny	United States	Traditional Animation
Bugs' Bonnets	United States	Traditional Animation
Busy Buddies	United States	Traditional Animation
The Clockmaker's Dog	United States	Traditional Animation
A Cowboy Needs a Horse	United States	Traditional Animation
Chips Ahoy	United States	Traditional Animation
Deduce, You Say!	United States	Traditional Animation
Destination Earth	United States	Traditional Animation
Down Beat Bear	United States	Traditional Animation
Dutch Treat	United States	Traditional Animation
The Egg and Jerry	United States	Traditional Animation
The Flying Sorceress	United States	Traditional Animation
Fright from Wrong	United States	Traditional Animation
Gee Whiz-z-z-z-z-z-z	United States	Traditional Animation
Gerald McBoing! Boing! on Planet Moo	United States	Traditional Animation
Ground Hog Play	United States	Traditional Animation
Half-Fare Hare	United States	Traditional Animation
A Haul in One	United States	Traditional Animation
Hide and Peak	United States	Traditional Animation
The High and the Flighty	United States	Traditional Animation
Hill-billing and Cooing	United States	Traditional Animation
The Honey-Mousers	United States	Traditional Animation
Hooked Bear	United States	Traditional Animation
How to Have an Accident in the Home	United States	Traditional Animation
I Don't Scare	United States	Traditional Animation
In the Bag	United States	Traditional Animation
Insect to Injury	United States	Traditional Animation
The Jaywalker	United States	Traditional Animation
Jack and Old Mac	United States	Traditional Animation
Killjoy Was Here!	United States	Traditional Animation
Lion in the Roar	United States	Traditional Animation
Line of Screamage	United States	Traditional Animation
Magoo's Puddle Jumper	United States	Traditional Animation
Millionaire Droopy	United States	Traditional Animation
Mousetro Herman	United States	Traditional Animation
Mouseum	United States	Traditional Animation
Muscle Beach Tom	United States	Traditional Animation
Napoleon Bunny-Part	United States	Traditional Animation
Out to Punch	United States	Traditional Animation
Park Avenue Pussycat	United States	Traditional Animation
Parlez Vous Woo	United States	Traditional Animation
Pedro and Lorenzo	United States	Traditional Animation
Penguin for Your Thoughts	United States	Traditional Animation
Popeye for President	United States	Traditional Animation
Rabbitson Crusoe	United States	Traditional Animation
Raw! Raw! Rooster!	United States	Traditional Animation
Rocket-Bye Baby	United States	Traditional Animation
Rocket Squad	United States	Traditional Animation
Rythmetic	Canada	Traditional Animation
Sir Irving and Jeames	United States	Traditional Animation
The Slap-Hoppy Mouse	United States	Traditional Animation
Sleuth But Sure	United States	Traditional Animation
A Star Is Bored	United States	Traditional Animation
Stupor Duck	United States	Traditional Animation
Swab the Duck	United States	Traditional Animation
There They Go-Go-Go!	United States	Traditional Animation
To Hare Is Human	United States	Traditional Animation
Tree Cornered Tweety	United States	Traditional Animation
Tugboat Granny	United States	Traditional Animation
Tweet and Sour	United States	Traditional Animation
Weasel Stop	United States	Traditional Animation
Wideo Wabbit	United States	Traditional Animation
Will Do Mousework	United States	Traditional Animation
Yankee Dood It	United States	Traditional Animation
Your Safety First	United States	Traditional Animation

== 1957 ==
Name	Country	Technique
African Jungle Hunt	United States	Traditional Animation
Ali Baba Bunny	United States	Traditional Animation
Bedevilled Rabbit	United States	Traditional Animation
Birds Anonymous	United States	Traditional Animation
The Bone Ranger	United States	Traditional Animation
Boo Bop	United States	Traditional Animation
Boston Quackie	United States	Traditional Animation
Boyhood Daze	United States	Traditional Animation
Bugsy and Mugsy	United States	Traditional Animation
A Bum Steer	United States	Traditional Animation
Cat in the Act	United States	Traditional Animation
Cat's Meow	United States	Traditional Animation
A Chairy Tale	Canada	Stop-motion Animation
Cheese It, the Cat!	United States	Traditional Animation
Clint Clobber's Cat	United States	Traditional Animation
Cock-a-Doodle Dino	United States	Traditional Animation
The Crystal Brawl	United States	Traditional Animation
Ducking the Devil	United States	Traditional Animation
Feedin' the Kiddie	United States	Traditional Animation
Fishing Tackler	United States	Traditional Animation
Flebus	United States	Traditional Animation
Fox-Terror	United States	Traditional Animation
From Mad to Worse	United States	Traditional Animation
Gag Buster	United States	Traditional Animation
Gaston Is Here	United States	Traditional Animation
Ghost of Honor	United States	Traditional Animation
Go Fly a Kit	United States	Traditional Animation
Gonzales' Tamales	United States	Traditional Animation
Greedy for Tweety	United States	Traditional Animation
A Hare-Breadth Finish	United States	Traditional Animation
Hooky Spooky	United States	Traditional Animation
Ice Scream	United States	Traditional Animation
In a Faraway Kingdom...	Soviet Union	Traditional Animation
It's a Living	United States	Traditional Animation
Jolly the Clown	United States	Traditional Animation
Jumping with Toy	United States	Traditional Animation
L'Amour the Merrier	United States	Traditional Animation
Love Is Blind	United States	Traditional Animation
Mouse-Taken Identity	United States	Traditional Animation
Mr. Money Gags	United States	Traditional Animation
Mucho Mouse	United States	Traditional Animation
Nearlyweds	United States	Traditional Animation
One Droopy Knight	United States	Traditional Animation
One Funny Knight	United States	Traditional Animation
Patriotic Popeye	United States	Traditional Animation
Peekaboo	United States	Traditional Animation
Pest Pupil	United States	Traditional Animation
Piker's Peak	United States	Traditional Animation
Possum Pearl	United States	Traditional Animation
Rabbit Romeo	United States	Traditional Animation
Scrambled Aches	United States	Traditional Animation
Show Biz Bugs	United States	Traditional Animation
Sky Scrappers	United States	Traditional Animation
Spooking About Africa	United States	Traditional Animation
Spooky Swabs	United States	Traditional Animation
Spree Lunch	United States	Traditional Animation
Steal Wool	United States	Traditional Animation
The Story of Anyburg U.S.A.	United States	Traditional Animation
Shove Thy Neighbor	United States	Traditional Animation
Tabasco Road	United States	Traditional Animation
Three Little Bops	United States	Traditional Animation
Timid Tabby	United States	Traditional Animation
Tom's Photo Finish	United States	Traditional Animation
Tops with Pops	United States	Traditional Animation
Topsy TV	United States	Traditional Animation
Touché and Go	United States	Traditional Animation
Trees and Jamaica Daddy	United States	Traditional Animation
The Truth About Mother Goose	United States	Traditional Animation
Tweet Zoo	United States	Traditional Animation
Tweety and the Beanstalk	United States	Traditional Animation
What's Opera, Doc?	United States	Traditional Animation
Zoom and Bored	United States	Traditional Animation

== 1958 ==
Name	Country	Technique
A Bird in a Bonnet	United States	Traditional Animation
Cat Feud	United States	Traditional Animation
Chew Chew Baby	United States	Traditional Animation
Camp Clobber	United States	Traditional Animation
Dante Dreamer	United States	Traditional Animation
Dawg Gawn	United States	Traditional Animation
Dog Tales	United States	Traditional Animation
Dom	Poland	Live-action/various
Don't Axe Me	United States	Traditional Animation
Dustcap Doormat	United States	Traditional Animation
Everglade Raid	United States	Traditional Animation
The Explosive Mr. Magoo	United States	Traditional Animation
Feather Bluster	United States	Traditional Animation
Finnegan's Flea	United States	Traditional Animation
Frighty Cat	United States	Traditional Animation
Gaston Go Home	United States	Traditional Animation
Gaston's Baby	United States	Traditional Animation
Gaston's Easel Life	United States	Traditional Animation
Ghost Writers	United States	Traditional Animation
Good Scream Fun	United States	Traditional Animation
Gopher Broke	United States	Traditional Animation
Grateful Gus	United States	Traditional Animation
Happy Go Ducky	United States	Traditional Animation
Hare-Less Wolf	United States	Traditional Animation
Hare-Way to the Stars	United States	Traditional Animation
Heir Restorer	United States	Traditional Animation
Hip Hip-Hurry!	United States	Traditional Animation
Hook, Line and Stinker	United States	Traditional Animation
The Juggler of Our Lady	United States	Traditional Animation
Knighty Knight Bugs	United States	Traditional Animation
The Little Island	United Kingdom	Limited
Magoo's Three Point Landing	United States	Traditional Animation
Magoo's Young Manhood	United States	Traditional Animation
Mole's Adventure	Japan	Traditional Animation
Now Hare This	United States	Traditional Animation
Okey Dokey Donkey	United States	Traditional Animation
Old Mother Clobber	United States	Traditional Animation
Paul Bunyan	United States	Traditional Animation
A Pizza Tweety-Pie	United States	Traditional Animation
Pre-Hysterical Hare	United States	Traditional Animation
Right Off the Bat	United States	Traditional Animation
Robin Hood Daffy	United States	Traditional Animation
Robin Hoodwinked	United States	Traditional Animation
Royal Cat Nap	United States	Traditional Animation
Scoutmaster Magoo	United States	Traditional Animation
Sick, Sick Sidney	United States	Traditional Animation
Sidney's Family Tree	United States	Traditional Animation
Signed, Sealed and Clobbered	United States	Traditional Animation
Spook and Span	United States	Traditional Animation
Sportickles	United States	Traditional Animation
Springtime for Clobber	United States	Traditional Animation
Stork Raving Mad	United States	Traditional Animation
Tapum! The History of Weapons	Italy	Traditional Animation
To Itch His Own	United States	Traditional Animation
Tortilla Flaps	United States	Traditional Animation
Tot Watchers	United States	Traditional Animation
Travelaffs	United States	Traditional Animation
The Vanishing Duck	United States	Traditional Animation
A Waggily Tale	United States	Traditional Animation
Weasel While You Work	United States	Traditional Animation
Which is Witch	United States	Traditional Animation
Whoa, Be-Gone!	United States	Traditional Animation
You Said a Mouseful	United States	Traditional Animation

== 1959 ==
Name	Country	Technique
The Animal Fair	United States	Traditional Animation
Another Day, Another Doormat	United States	Traditional Animation
Apes of Wrath	United States	Traditional Animation
Backwoods Bunny	United States	Traditional Animation
Baton Bunny	United States	Traditional Animation
Bonanza Bunny	United States	Traditional Animation
A Broken Leghorn	United States	Traditional Animation
Bwana Magoo	United States	Traditional Animation
Casper's Birthday Party	United States	Traditional Animation
Cat's Paw	United States	Traditional Animation
China Jones	United States	Traditional Animation
Clobber's Ballet Ache	United States	Traditional Animation
Cow on the Moon	Yugoslavia	Traditional Animation
Doing What's Fright	United States	Traditional Animation
Donald in Mathmagic Land	United States	Live-action/traditional
Down to Mirth	United States	Traditional Animation
The Fabulous Firework Family	United States	Traditional Animation
Felineous Assault	United States	Traditional Animation
Fit to be Toyed	United States	Traditional Animation
The Flamboyant Arms	United States	Traditional Animation
Foofle's Train Ride	United States	Traditional Animation
Fun on Furlough	United States	Traditional Animation
Gaston's Mama Lisa	United States	Traditional Animation
Hashimoto-San	United States	Traditional Animation
Hare-Abian Nights	United States	Traditional Animation
Here Today, Gone Tamale	United States	Traditional Animation
Hot-Rod and Reel!	United States	Traditional Animation
Hound About	United States	Traditional Animation
Huey's Father's Day	United States	Traditional Animation
How to Have an Accident at Work	United States	Traditional Animation
Katnip's Big Day	United States	Traditional Animation
La Petite Parade	United States	Traditional Animation
The Leaky Faucet	United States	Traditional Animation
Little Bo Bopped	United States	Traditional Animation
Magoo's Homecoming	United States	Traditional Animation
Magoo's Lodge Brother	United States	Traditional Animation
Merry Minstrel Magoo	United States	Traditional Animation
Mexicali Shmoes	United States	Traditional Animation
The Minute and a ½ Man	United States	Traditional Animation
Moonbird	United States	Traditional Animation
The Mouse That Jack Built	United States	Traditional Animation
Mouse-Placed Kitten	United States	Traditional Animation
A Mutt in a Rut	United States	Traditional Animation
Noah's Ark	United States	Traditional Animation
Not Ghoulty	United States	Traditional Animation
Out of This Whirl	United States	Traditional Animation
Outer Space Visitor	United States	Traditional Animation
Owly to Bed	United States	Traditional Animation
People Are Bunny	United States	Traditional Animation
Really Scent	United States	Traditional Animation
Spooking of Ghosts	United States	Traditional Animation
The Tale of a Dog	United States	Traditional Animation
Talking Horse Sense	United States	Traditional Animation
Terror Faces Magoo	United States	Traditional Animation
Trick or Tweet	United States	Traditional Animation
T.V. Fuddlehead	United States	Traditional Animation
Tweet and Lovely	United States	Traditional Animation
Tweet Dreams	United States	Traditional Animation
Unnatural History	United States	Traditional Animation
The Violinist	United States	Traditional Animation
Wild About Hurry	United States	Traditional Animation
Wild and Woolly Hare	United States	Traditional Animation
Wild Life	United States	Traditional Animation
A Witch's Tangled Hare	United States	Traditional Animation
Wolf Hounded	United States	Traditional Animation
