= Yale Gracey =

American writer (1910–1983)

- Born: September 3, 1910; Shanghai, China
- Died: September 5, 1983 (aged 73); Pacific Palisades, Los Angeles, California, United States
- Cause of death: Murder
- Education: Art Institute of Chicago, Art Center School of Design, The Chouinard Art Institute
- Occupations: Animator; Imagineer
- Years active: 1939–1975
- Employer: Walt Disney Productions (1942–1956)
- Spouse: Beverly Gracey (m. 1946)
- Children: Wayne Gracey, Lucky Gracey
- Family: Yale

Yale Wilbur Gracey (September 3, 1910 – September 5, 1983) was a Disney Imagineer, writer, and layout artist for many Disney animated shorts, including classics such as The Three Caballeros and Fantasia. Gracey joined the company in 1939 as a layout artist for Pinocchio. In the 1960s, he designed many of the special effects for the Pirates of the Caribbean and Haunted Mansion attractions at Disneyland. Among these was a fire effect, developed for Pirates of the Caribbean, which appeared so realistic that the Disneyland fire department wanted an emergency switch to turn it off in case of a real fire. The Haunted Mansion character Master Gracey was named in homage to him. Gracey retired from the company on October 4, 1975.

== Family ==
Gracey was the grandson of Charles G. Yale, businessman and club man, Secretary of the San Francisco Yacht Club and 1st President of the Pacific Inter-Club Yacht Association. His great-grandfather was Colonel Gregory Yale (1817–1871), a mining claims and maritime lawyer, who arrived in San Francisco in 1849, and was involved in Senator Broderick's case, as well as with Salvador Vallejo, brother of Gen. Vallejo.

He was in partnership under Yale & McConnell, with Attorney General of California John R. McConnell, and sat on committees with Congressman Thompson Campbell, Senator John S. Hager, Congressman Joseph P. Hoge, and at events with Gov. John B. Weller. He defended the Vice President of the Republic of Lower California, Col. Watkins, with Gov. Henry S. Foote, and Yale was involved himself in a duel against Bailie Peyton.

His fortune amounted to $300,000 in 1857. He was also a real estate investor and an associate of Frank Turk, a pioneer of the city of San Francisco. His great-uncle, Frank Willey Yale (1854), was married to Fannie Amelia Bleecker, granddaughter of Major general Leonard Bleecker, a member of the Bleecker family of Bleecker Street, New York, and cofounder of the New York Stock Exchange through the Buttonwood Agreement.

== Personal life ==
Gracey's parents were Enid Yale (1884–1968) and Wilbur Tirrell Gracey (1877–1946). His father was a US Marshal and diplomat who served in consulates in China, Mexico, Spain, and the United Kingdom. His grandfather, Rev Samuel Levis Gracey (1835–1911) was a Methodist clergyman who had served in the Civil War as the chaplain for 6th Pennsylvania Cavalry Regiment ("Rush's Lancers"), 1st Division Cavalry Corps of the Army of the Potomac, and 2nd Pennsylvania Cavalry Regiment.

In 1946, Gracey married Beverly-Joyce Newman of Beverly Hills, California. They had two sons, Wayne and Lucky Gracey, five grandchildren and five great-grandchildren.

== Death ==
On September 5, 1983, Gracey was shot and killed in Los Angeles by a burglar. His wife was also injured in the attack. Gracey and his wife, Beverly, were staying overnight at their cabana at the Bel Air Bay Club, on Pacific Coast Highway in the Pacific Palisades neighborhood of western Los Angeles. The shooting was reported at approximately 2:30 a.m. by another club member. A police spokesman indicated that Gracey and his wife were both asleep when an unknown intruder entered and shot them both, then fled onto the beach. A motive was not determined, and there were no suspects. As of 2023, the Gracey murder remains a cold case.

Gracey's widow, Beverly Gracey, died on November 1, 2017, at the age of 95.

== Disney filmography ==
Year	Film	Position
1940	Pinocchio	layout artist
1940	Fantasia	segment "The Pastoral Symphony"
1941	The Reluctant Dragon	art direction: cartoon sequences
1942	Saludos Amigos	backgrounds/layout artist - uncredited
1943	Figaro and Cleo	layout artist - uncredited
1944	''Donald's Off Day''	layout artist
1944	The Three Caballeros	layout artist
1945	The Eyes Have It	layout artist
1945	No Sail	layout artist
1946	A Knight for a Day	layout artist
1946	Lighthouse Keeping	layout artist
1946	The Story of Menstruation	layout artist
1946	Frank Duck Brings 'em Back Alive	layout artist - uncredited
1946	Double Dribble	layout artist
1947	Straight Shooters	layout artist
1947	Clown of the Jungle	layout artist
1947	Bootle Beetle	layout artist
1947	Foul Hunting	layout artist
1947	''Chip an' Dale''	layout artist
1948	They're Off	layout artist
1948	Inferior Decorator	layout artist
1948	''Soup's On''	layout artist
1948	Three for Breakfast	layout artist
1948	Tea for Two Hundred	layout artist
1949	''Donald's Happy Birthday''	layout artist
1949	Sea Salts	layout artist
1949	Winter Storage	layout artist
1949	Honey Harvester	layout artist
1949	All in a Nutshell	layout artist
1949	The Greener Yard	layout artist
1949	Slide, Donald, Slide	layout artist
1949	Toy Tinkers	layout artist
1950	Lion Around	layout artist
1950	Crazy Over Daisy	layout artist
1950	Trailer Horn	layout artist
1950	Hook, Lion and Sinker	layout artist
1950	Bee at the Beach	layout artist
1950	Out on a Limb	layout artist
1951	Chicken in the Rough	layout artist
1951	Dude Duck	layout artist
1951	Corn Chips	layout artist
1951	Test Pilot Donald	layout artist
1951	Lucky Number	layout artist
1951	Out of Scale	layout artist
1951	Bee on Guard	layout artist
1952	Donald Applecore	layout artist
1952	Lambert the Sheepish Lion	layout artist
1952	Two Chips and a Miss	layout artist
1952	Let's Stick Together	layout artist
1952	''Uncle Donald's Ants''	layout artist
1952	Trick or Treat	background artist, layout artist
1952	''Pluto's Christmas Tree''	layout artist
1953	''Don's Fountain of Youth''	layout artist
1953	The New Neighbor	layout artist
1953	Rugged Bear	layout artist
1953	Working for Peanuts	layout artist
1953	Canvas Back Duck	layout artist
1954-1968	The Magical World of Disney	layout artist, stylist ("The Plausible Impossible")
1954	Spare the Rod	layout artist
1954	Dragon Around	layout artist
1954	Grin and Bear It	layout artist
1954	The Flying Squirrel	layout artist
1955	No Hunting	layout artist
1955	Bearly Asleep	layout artist
1955	Beezy Bear	layout artist
1955	Up a Tree	layout artist
1956	Hooked Bear	layout artist
1956	In the Bag	layout artist
