= Slide, Donald, Slide =

- Theatrical release poster
- Directed by: Jack Hannah
- Story by: Bill Berg; Nick George
- Produced by: Walt Disney
- Starring: Clarence Nash
- Music by: Oliver Wallace
- Animation by: Bob Carlson; Volus Jones; Bill Justice; Judge Whitaker
- Layouts by: Yale Gracey
- Backgrounds by: Thelma Witmer
- Color process: Technicolor
- Production company: Walt Disney Productions
- Distributed by: RKO Radio Pictures
- Release date: November 25, 1949; (US)
- Running time: 6:40
- Country: United States
- Language: English

Slide, Donald, Slide is an American animated short film directed by Jack Hannah. In the short film, Spike the Bee listens to classical music while Donald Duck listens to the World Series and the two fight each other over the radio. Part of the Donald Duck film series, the film was produced in Technicolor by Walt Disney Productions and released to theaters by RKO Radio Pictures on November 25, 1949.

== Plot ==
Spike the Bee is listening to classical music on the radio, pretending to be a conductor. Donald Duck interrupts him and listens to the baseball World Series to hear his favorite star Casey and pretends to play baseball. Spike and Donald both fight over the radio. Spike threatens to sting Donald as he hides in his house. Donald builds a fake radio with a dynamite stick and the dynamite explodes and the bee is shaken up. Donald laughs at him and runs around the bases. Spike gets revenge by pointing his stinger at Donald's rear end. Donald slides for home base, but his rear end slides into the Bee's stinger, causing him to yell and jump up into the air.

The radio announcer tells people that Casey is out, and Donald angrily goes into his house to take a shower. Spike locks Donald in the shower from the outside lock and plays classical music as a conductor. Donald sees this and tries in vain to open the shower door as he loses his temper, but he remains trapped in his shower. The Bee then finishes conducting the music and rests.

== Voice cast ==
- Clarence Nash as Donald Duck

== Home media ==
The short was released on December 11, 2007, on Walt Disney Treasures: The Chronological Donald, Volume Three: 1947-1950.
