= How to Have an Accident in the Home =

1956 Donald Duck cartoon

- Directed by: Charles A. Nichols
- Story by: Jack Kinney; Bill Berg
- Produced by: Walt Disney
- Starring: Clarence Nash; Bill Thompson
- Music by: Franklyn Marks
- Animation by: Jerry Hathcock; Volus Jones; George Nicholas; Hugh Fraser
- Layouts by: Ernie Nordli; Lance Nolley
- Backgrounds by: Anthony Rizzo
- Production company: Walt Disney Productions
- Distributed by: Buena Vista Film Distribution Company
- Release date: July 7, 1956
- Running time: 7 minutes
- Country: United States
- Language: English

How to Have an Accident in the Home is a 1956 animated short film featuring Donald Duck. It was released by Walt Disney Productions.

== Plot ==
J.J. Fate (a physical personification of destiny) lectures on how accidents are not caused by "fate"; they seem to be caused by people's carelessness. Donald Duck, being extremely accident-prone, is used as an example. He highlights a series of mishaps that are caused, not by "fate", but by Donald's own carelessness.

== Voice cast ==
- Clarence Nash as Donald Duck
- Bill Thompson as J.J. Fate

== Home media ==
The short was released on November 11, 2008 on Walt Disney Treasures: The Chronological Donald, Volume Four: 1951-1961.
