= Lighthouse Keeping =

1946 Donald Duck cartoon

- Theatrical release poster
- Directed by: Jack Hannah
- Story by: Harry Reeves; Jesse Marsh
- Produced by: Walt Disney
- Starring: Clarence Nash
- Music by: Oliver Wallace
- Animation by: Hal King; Bob Carlson; Judge Whitaker; Fred Jones
- Layouts by: Yale Gracey
- Backgrounds by: Howard Dunn
- Color process: Technicolor
- Production company: Walt Disney Productions
- Distributed by: RKO Radio Pictures
- Release date: September 20, 1946
- Running time: 6:39
- Country: United States
- Language: English

Lighthouse Keeping is a 1946 American animated short film directed by Jack Hannah and produced by Walt Disney. In the cartoon, Donald battles with an angry pelican to keep his lighthouse light on.

The pelican's name is not used in the short, but Disney A to Z reveals that his name is Marblehead.

== Plot ==
Donald is a lighthouse keeper at a flame-based lighthouse. While tending the lamp at night, he tries to read a book using the light from the rotating lamp. Donald falls off of his chair trying to catch the light on his book, so he moves a bit closer to the lamp and allows it to rotate his office chair along with it. He ends up sliding towards the window and becomes frustrated that he can't read his book successfully. He then sees a sleeping pelican out the window, and, acting devilishly, he decides to wake him up by shining the light on him. After the pelican wakes up, he moves to another spot - only to have Donald adjust the lamp to shine on him again just as he's falling back asleep. The pelican blocks the light with his nest, but strands of light shine through the twigs and focus on his forehead. The pelican gets fed up and invades the lighthouse, putting out the flame. Donald and the pelican then engage in a fast-paced duel for the rest of the night, lighting and extinguishing the lamp while each try various actions to incapacitate the other. Sunrise comes, but Donald draws all of the window shades closed, continuing their duel as the short fades out.

== Voice cast ==
- Clarence Nash as Donald Duck

== Television ==
- Disneyland, episode #4.7: "Duck for Hire"
- Donald's Quack Attack, episode #37
- The Ink and Paint Club, episode #1.21: "Goin' to the Birds"

== Home media ==
The short was released on December 6, 2005, on Walt Disney Treasures: The Chronological Donald, Volume Two: 1942-1946.

Additional release include:

- Bonus on Pete's Dragon Gold Classic Collection (2000).
