= The Litterbug =

1961 Donald Duck cartoon

- Directed by: Hamilton Luske
- Story by: Bill Berg; Lance Nolley
- Produced by: Walt Disney
- Narrated by: John Dehner
- Music by: Buddy Baker
- Animation by: John Sibley; Ted Berman; Jack Boyd (effects animation)
- Layouts by: Joe Hale
- Backgrounds by: Al Dempster
- Color process: Technicolor
- Production company: Walt Disney Productions
- Distributed by: Buena Vista Distribution
- Release date: June 21, 1961
- Running time: 8 minutes
- Country: United States
- Language: English

The Litterbug is a 1961 American animated short film featuring Donald Duck. It was directed by Hamilton Luske and produced by Walt Disney Productions. The story was by Bill Berg and Lance Nolley.

== Plot ==
Donald Duck is used as an example of various types of litterbugs who either consciously or unconsciously litter wherever they go.

== Voice cast ==
- John Dehner as narrator

== Release ==
It was theatrically released on June 21, 1961, and was the last theatrical Donald Duck short to be produced.

== Home media ==
It was released on DVD on November 11, 2008, on Walt Disney Treasures: The Chronological Donald, Volume Four: 1951-1961.
