= Uncle Donald's Ants =

1952 Donald Duck cartoon

- Theatrical release poster
- Directed by: Jack Hannah
- Story by: Nick George; Al Bertino
- Produced by: Walt Disney
- Starring: Clarence Nash; Pinto Colvig
- Music by: Oliver Wallace
- Animation by: Bob Carlson; Volus Jones; Bill Justice; Hugh Fraser
- Layouts by: Yale Gracey
- Backgrounds by: Claude Coats
- Production company: Walt Disney Productions
- Distributed by: RKO Radio Pictures, Inc.
- Release date: July 18, 1952
- Running time: 7 minutes
- Country: United States
- Language: English

Uncle Donald's Ants is a 1952 animated short film featuring Donald Duck. It was released by Walt Disney Productions.

== Plot ==
Donald Duck accidentally drops some sugar on the sidewalk, attracting ants. Eventually the ants take over his home, stealing a cake, building a pipeline of macaroni to transport the maple syrup to their hill, and multiple other incidents that incite Donald's temper.

== Voice cast ==
- Clarence Nash as Donald Duck
- Pinto Colvig as the ants

== Home media ==
The short was released on November 11, 2008 on Walt Disney Treasures: The Chronological Donald, Volume Four: 1951-1961.
