= Motor Mania =

1950 animated short film starring Goofy

- Poster
- Directed by: Jack Kinney
- Story by: Dick Kinney; Milt Schaffer
- Produced by: Walt Disney
- Starring: Bob Jackman; John McLeish
- Music by: Paul J. Smith
- Animation by: John Sibley; Charles Nichols; Ed Aardal; Jack Boyd
- Layouts by: Al Zinnen
- Backgrounds by: Claude Coats
- Color process: Technicolor
- Production company: Walt Disney Productions
- Distributed by: RKO Radio Pictures
- Release date: June 30, 1950
- Running time: 7 minutes (one reel)
- Country: United States
- Language: English

Motor Mania is a cartoon released by Walt Disney Productions on June 30, 1950. In this short, Goofy is a Mr. Hyde-type split personality, who gets behind the wheel and shows the dangers of not driving safely.

== Plot ==
The cartoon shows how the character, as the pleasant, friendly, and good-natured "Mr. Walker" who "wouldn't hurt a fly nor step on an ant", undergoes a Jekyll-and-Hyde-like change in personality to the violent "Mr. Wheeler, motorist" when he gets behind the wheel of his yellow car. As Mr. Walker, pedestrian, he's polite, safe, and good-natured; while as Mr. Wheeler, he is very mean, reckless, and predatory. Upon reaching his destination in town (he apparently only wanted to buy a newspaper) and leaving his automobile, he reverts to the mild-mannered Mr. Walker, whereupon he is the victim of other motorists' unsafe (and sometimes even predatory) driving habits. However, once he returns to his car, he becomes Mr. Wheeler, motorist, again, seeking to impose his own will upon traffic, to the point of blaming the tow truck which hauls him away for his slow pace after his own collision, and breaks the fourth wall by telling the narrator, "Ah, shut up!"

== Home media ==
The short was released on December 2, 2002, on Walt Disney Treasures: The Complete Goofy.

== Voice cast ==
- Mr. Walker/Mr. Wheeler: Bob Jackman
- Narrator: John McLeish
