= Social Lion =

- Directed by: Jack Kinney
- Story by: Milt Schaffer and Dick Kinney
- Produced by: Walt Disney
- Starring: Stan Freberg, Paul Frees, James MacDonald
- Music by: Oliver Wallace
- Animation by: Norman Ferguson
- Layouts by: Bruce Bushman
- Backgrounds by: Thelma Witmer
- Production company: Walt Disney Productions
- Distributed by: RKO Radio Pictures
- Release date: October 15, 1954
- Running time: 6 min.
- Country: United States
- Language: English

Social Lion is a Walt Disney-produced animated short film directed by Jack Kinney, released by Buena Vista on October 15, 1954. The film was written by Milt Schaffer and Dick Kinney and animated entirely by Disney veteran Norm Ferguson.

== Synopsis ==
A safari captures a lion in Africa, but his cage falls off the boat once he arrives in the US. The lion gets out of his cage, but fails to intimidate anyone, even several people interact with him in places such as a bus or a bar. In the end, the lion is captured by a group of policemen and taken to a zoo.

== Cast ==
- Clarence Nash - Lion (uncredited)
- Paul Frees - Lions Club President / Drunkards / Clothing Salesman (voice) (uncredited)
- James MacDonald - Lion (roaring) (voice) (uncredited)

== Home media ==
The DVD "Disney Rarities: Celebrated Shorts: 1920s–1960s" featured this short.
