= Bee on Guard =

1951 Donald Duck cartoon

- Theatrical release poster
- Directed by: Jack Hannah
- Story by: Bill Berg; Nick George
- Produced by: Walt Disney
- Starring: Clarence Nash; Pinto Colvig
- Music by: Oliver Wallace
- Animation by: Bob Carlson; Volus Jones; Bill Justice; George Kreisel
- Layouts by: Yale Gracey
- Backgrounds by: Thelma Whitmer
- Production company: Walt Disney Productions
- Distributed by: RKO Radio Pictures, Inc.
- Release date: December 14, 1951
- Running time: 7 minutes
- Country: United States
- Language: English

Bee on Guard is a 1951 animated short film featuring Donald Duck. It was released by Walt Disney Productions.

== Plot ==
Donald Duck is enjoying a normal summer day by tending his garden when suddenly bees infiltrate his garden. Following the bees back to their hive, Donald realizes that they are using the flower’s nectar to create honey. Donald tries to enter the hive with the bees but is denied access by the Guard Bee, so Donald decides to raid the hive and steal the honey. Donald disguises himself as a bee and converses with the Guard Bee. The two share a cup of honey as Donald secretly siphons the honey out of the hive without the Guard Bee noticing. Donald returns home with enough honey to fill many jars leaving behind the Guard Bee asleep in front of the hive when the King Bee returns to find all their honey has been stolen. Blaming the Guard Bee for losing the honey, the King Bee banishes the Guard Bee from the hive. Soon, however, the Guard Bee realizes what happened and tracks down Donald to discover that he is not a bee, but the same duck that had tried to enter the hive earlier that day. Donald returns to the hive later that day where the Guard Bee awaits him. The two fight with their stingers and Donald’s fake stinger is stolen by the bee. The short ends with Donald being chased by the Guard Bee carrying the stinger.

== Voice cast ==
- Clarence Nash as Donald Duck
- Pinto Colvig as Guard Bee

== Production ==
=== Development ===
There is a long history of Donald Duck throughout Walt Disney Studios animation. Bee On Guard features the character Donald Duck who appears in many animated shorts throughout the 1950s and 1960s. While Donald Duck has changed in style over the years, his short-tempered mannerisms have stayed the same. A common story-line used throughout Donald Duck's animated shorts, that is incorporated into Hannah’s Bee On Guard, involves Donald going about his day, undergoing a few of life’s torments, and losing his temper, ending the film with a wild, sputtering paroxysm of rage. In an interview, the animated short director Jack Hannah stated that he consistently looked for foils for the Duck to get into, often resulting in Donald Duck battling a lot of bees. The other main character in Bee On Guard is Spike (originally named ‘Buzz Buzz’), a tiny bee tasked with guarding the hive castle. Hannah stated that supporting characters like Spike added variety to the Duck shorts because “the bee is a menace with that stinger as a weapon and is much smaller than the Duck so it would be funny having the little guy battling a big bully.” However, Bee On Guard utilizes Spike in a slightly different way as Donald Duck is the antagonist who trying to steal Spike’s honey, and Spike is instinctively protecting the hive.

=== Animation and Design ===
Bee On Guard was animated by Bob Carlson, Volus Jones, Bill Justice, George Kreisl, and Art Stevens with background artists Alan Maley and Thelma Witmer and layout artist Yale Gracey. The short was created during the “Silver Era” of Walt Disney animation, meaning that the short involved the cel animation process. Cel animation, also known as traditional animation or hand-drawn animation, is a technique where individual frames or cels are drawn by hand and then photographed or digitally scanned to create motion. Each frame typically represents a slight progression of movement, and when played in sequence at a rapid pace, creates the illusion of continuous motion. Every cel used in Bee On Guard was hand-drawn and photographed. This process was both time-consuming and expensive which is why Disney eventually converted to Xerox technology to cut down on production costs.

== Reception ==
Bee On Guard has received mixed reviews from critics, many commenting on the long string of bee films speckled throughout Donald Duck’s filmography. One blogger wrote, “While the visuals are funny, it left me flat” writing that the shifting viewpoints from the bees to Donald and back again were hard to follow and that it was hard to say who they were supposed to sympathize with in the end. Another critic wrote, “It's amusing enough, but lacks the style of the early bee pictures with "Buzz Buzz" as his main enemy. Animation is up to the usual Disney standard.” A third critic remarked, “This one stung a little.” stating that while Donald gets a fair share of mishaps, the short lacks the slapstick comedy that is popular in Disney cartoons.

== Home media ==
The short was released on November 11, 2008 on Walt Disney Treasures: The Chronological Donald, Volume Four: 1951-1961.
