= Dragon Around =

1954 Donald Duck cartoon

- Theatrical release poster
- Directed by: Jack Hannah
- Story by: Nick George; Roy Williams
- Produced by: Walt Disney
- Starring: Clarence Nash; James MacDonald; Dessie Flynn
- Music by: Oliver Wallace
- Animation by: William Justice; Volus Jones
- Layouts by: Yale Gracey
- Backgrounds by: Ray Huffine
- Color process: Technicolor
- Production company: Walt Disney Productions
- Distributed by: RKO Radio Pictures
- Release date: July 16, 1954
- Running time: 6:57
- Country: United States
- Language: English

Dragon Around is a 1954 American animated short film directed by Jack Hannah and produced by Walt Disney, featuring Donald Duck and Chip 'n' Dale.

== Plot ==
Dale is admiring a discarded book of fairy tales at a junkyard. As he recreates a tale of a knight and a dragon, a shadowy, dragon-like figure appears in the distance and frightens Dale back home to a castle-like tree, where Chip is organizing acorns. After Dale hastily attempts to explain his encounter, the duo return to the junkyard, but the figure is no longer there. Chip dismisses Dale's story as nonsense, until the draconic figure returns and frightens them both away. The "dragon" then reveals itself to be a steam shovel, operated by Donald Duck, who is constructing a freeway.

Surveying the area, Donald determines that the chipmunks' tree must be removed and begins digging around it. Chip and Dale intervene, but Donald fends them off effortlessly. Inspired by the fairy tale, the chipmunks dress up as a knight and horse. Donald spots the duo in their disguise and hides a welding torch inside the shovel's bucket. As the chipmunks charge forward, Donald ambushes them with the hidden torch and they flee. Donald then attempts to lure them out of hiding by pretending to fall asleep. The chipmunks take the bait and strike the sleeping "dragon". Donald feigns death throes with the bucket and slams it on the ground. As the chipmunks celebrate their victory over the "dragon", Donald springs his trap, grabbing and devouring the duo with the bucket as he laughs triumphantly. However, the chipmunks manage to escape by knocking out one of the bucket's teeth with a steel pipe.

Donald hastily replaces the broken tooth and begins digging even more furiously at the tree, but the chipmunks stop him by launching a barrel of tar at the bucket, destroying its remaining teeth. Enraged, Donald captures the chipmunks and locks them in his toolbox, then begins ramming the tree with the now-toothless bucket. As he ascends a nearby hill for one final charge, Chip and Dale make their escape and use Donald's tools to dismantle his steam shovel. The machine then falls apart as it surges towards the tree, leaving only the driver's seat with Donald himself in it, who then crashes head-on into the tree.

Running out of patience, Donald places and lights several sticks of dynamite around the tree in a last-ditch attempt to remove it. As he rushes off to await the explosion, the chipmunks extinguish and collect the dynamite, using it to booby trap Donald's ladder and set it up against their tree. Dale lures Donald up the ladder as Chip lights the dynamite. As Donald reaches the top, Dale exposes the charade. Donald panics and flees, inadvertently bringing the dynamite with him, and is repeatedly blasted into the air by the ensuing explosions. As the chipmunks watch, Chip plays a trick on Dale by ripping the dragon's picture out of the fairy tale book and hiding behind it. Though startled at first, Dale is amused by the prank and the duo share a good laugh as the short irises out.

== Voice cast ==
- Donald Duck: Clarence Nash
- Chip: Jimmy MacDonald
- Dale: Dessie Flynn

== Television ==
- The Mouse Factory, episode #8: "Man at Work"
- Good Morning, Mickey, episode #12
- Mickey's Mouse Tracks, episode #48
- Donald's Quack Attack, episode #58
- The Ink and Paint Club, episode #1.5 "Chip 'n' Dale"

== Home media ==
The short was released on November 11, 2008, on Walt Disney Treasures: The Chronological Donald, Volume Four: 1951-1961.

Additional physical releases include:

- Mickey Mouse and Donald Duck Cartoon Collections, Volume One (VHS)
- Walt Disney Cartoon Classics: Starring Chip 'n' Dale (VHS)
- Mickey and Company (VHS)
- Walt Disney Cartoon Classics: Starring Mickey & Minnie / Starring Chip 'n' Dale (LaserDisc)
- Walt Disney's Classic Cartoon Favorites: Starring Chip 'n' Dale (DVD)
- Chip 'n' Dale Volume 2: Trouble in a Tree (DVD)

The short has also been made available to stream on Disney+.
