= Bee at the Beach =

1950 Donald Duck cartoon

- Theatrical release poster
- Directed by: Jack Hannah
- Story by: Bill Berg; Nick George
- Produced by: Walt Disney
- Starring: Clarence Nash
- Music by: Joseph Dubin
- Animation by: Bob Carlson; Volus Jones; Bill Justice; Judge Whitaker
- Layouts by: Yale Gracey
- Backgrounds by: Ralph Hulett
- Production company: Walt Disney Productions
- Distributed by: RKO Radio Pictures, Inc.
- Release date: October 13, 1950
- Running time: 6:20
- Country: United States
- Language: English

Bee at the Beach is a 1950 animated short film featuring Donald Duck. It was released by Walt Disney Productions.

== Plot ==
Donald sets up for a day at the beach right over the same spot that Spike the Bee has settled in for a relaxing day. Spike, angry, then goes after Donald, including, among other things, stinging the inflatable raft that Donald is using in the water and putting him in danger in shark-infested waters.

== Voice cast ==
- Clarence Nash as Donald Duck

== Home media ==
The short was released on December 11, 2007 on Walt Disney Treasures: The Chronological Donald, Volume Three: 1947-1950.
