= Hook, Lion and Sinker =

1950 Donald Duck cartoon

- Theatrical release poster
- Directed by: Jack Hannah
- Written by: Bill Berg; Nick George
- Produced by: Walt Disney
- Starring: Clarence Nash
- Music by: Paul J. Smith
- Animation by: Volus Jones; Bill Justice; Bob Carlson; John Sibley; Jack Boyd (effects)
- Layouts by: Yale Gracey
- Backgrounds by: Thelma Witmer
- Production company: Walt Disney Productions
- Distributed by: RKO Radio Pictures
- Release date: September 1, 1950
- Running time: 7 minutes
- Country: United States
- Language: English

Hook, Lion and Sinker is a Disney short cartoon featuring Donald Duck, who appears as a fisherman, and Louie the Mountain Lion. This is the second episode to feature Louie and the only episode where he is shown to have a son. The film's plot centers on the lions trying to steal Donald's catch of fish. The title is a pun on the phrase "hook, line and sinker".

== Plot ==
Louie the Mountain Lion is fishing while sitting in a tree, but hasn't had any success so far. His son comes out of their nearby den and playfully tricks his father into thinking he has caught a fish by pouncing onto the bait. When Louie reels his son in and realizes that this was a joke, he gives his son a mild pummeling and returns to his fishing spot. His son comes back out and sees Donald Duck returning to his house with a catch of fish. As Donald walks up the dock, he accidentally drops one of his fish, and Louie's son fetches it and brings it back to his dad. Louie, meanwhile, is finally able to catch a fish of his own, but upon seeing the much larger fish his son has brought, he and his son decide to go to Donald's house to get more. Upon arriving, though, they realize that they will have to approach undetected, as three previous intruder lions were shot and their heads made into taxidermy mounts. At first, Louie tries to get his paw inside, but Donald lifts off a stove lid which burns Louie's paw. His son laughs at this, but Louie quiets him down and tries again. Donald, however, was anticipating this and fires his gun at him, putting bullet shells in Louie's rear end. Louie's son removes them, much to his father's pain.

The lions try again to get some fish, this time with Louie's son sneaking inside through the wood box. Again, the plan is unsuccessful, but Donald merely throws Louie's son out the window, rather than fire his gun at him. Louie, who quickly becomes fed up with his son's frustration-based babbling, puts him in a barrel and tries yet again. This time, the plan initially works, with Louie raising the fish up on a hook out of the chimney, until he takes a fish right out of Donald's hands and knocks him against the ceiling. Donald goes for his gun again and shoots Louie, provoking his son to remove the shells from inside the barrel on which his dad is sitting. The lions' final plan to get the fish is successful, but they accidentally take Donald (and all his clothes off in the process) and Donald's gun as well. In the chaos, Donald gets his gun and clothes back and shoots at Louie once again. He outruns the shells until thwarted by the walls of his cave, after which Louie is once more hit in the rear end, and his son once again removes the shells from his bottom.

== Voice cast ==
- Clarence Nash as Donald Duck

== Home media ==
The short was released on December 11, 2007, on Walt Disney Treasures: The Chronological Donald, Volume Three: 1947-1950.
