= The New Neighbor =

1953 Donald Duck cartoon

- Theatrical release poster
- Directed by: Jack Hannah
- Story by: Nick George; Milt Schaffer
- Produced by: Walt Disney
- Starring: Clarence Nash; Billy Bletcher
- Music by: Edward Plumb
- Animation by: Edwin Aardal; Al Coe; George Kreisl; Volus Jones; Dan MacManus (effects)
- Layouts by: Yale Gracey
- Backgrounds by: Thelma Witmer
- Color process: Technicolor
- Production company: Walt Disney Productions
- Distributed by: RKO Radio Pictures
- Release date: August 1, 1953
- Running time: 7 minutes
- Country: United States
- Language: English

The New Neighbor is a 1953 American animated short film directed by Jack Hannah and produced by Walt Disney, featuring Donald Duck. In the short film, Donald moves to a new place and gets along with his new next-door neighbor, Pete.

== Plot ==
Donald has recently moved into a new house and neighborhood. Donald observes his neighbor Pete walking outside to dump garbage into Donald's yard, followed by Pete's dog Muncey breaking through the fence to dig up Donald's garden. Pete introduces himself, and immediately takes advantage of Donald's initial friendliness to take all of Donald's food and serving ware. When Pete appears at the door again, his seemingly gracious offer of a bowl of homemade green porridge turns out to actually be dog food.

With Spring arriving, the neighborhood's focus turns to their yards. Donald comes out with his wheelbarrow and tools, but before he can even start using them, Pete forcibly takes each one as Donald picks it up (fork, trowel, sprayer, pruners, clippers). When a sudden thunderstorm breaks out, both neighbors run for cover, but Pete reminds Donald that all of his tools are sitting out in what has become a mud puddle. This forces Donald to run out in the rain to save the tools from being ruined, while Pete sits inside warm and dry.

On a later spring day, Pete is trimming his tree, and the wind blows all of the leaves and branches onto Donald's lawn. Pete mockingly says to Donald, "Better rake 'em up quick! They'll ruin your lawn!" and laughs. Donald scrambles to rake up all the debris and places them into his incinerator. Upon noticing Pete's laundry on a nearby drying line, Donald sees an opportunity for revenge. Burning the leaves, Donald directs the smoke towards Pete's laundry, and taunts Pete by pointing this out. The two trade further attempts to one-up the other's nastiness, causing escalation into a full-scale war.

The escalating conflict attracts crowds and local TV coverage. Pete kicks things off by cutting a large protruding limb from Donald's tree, to which Donald responds by cutting Pete's long johns that were extending over the property line. The battle continues to intensify with increasingly violent and destructive acts. Donald and Pete ultimately end up on a ladder suspended on the fence, making them appear to be playing on a "see-saw", while the crowd laughs at them. Pete lifts the ladder, but Donald uses gravity to run his lawn mower at Pete, injuring Pete's back.

With a break in between "rounds", both neighbors retreat to their "corners" for a break and pep talk from their supporters. One person from the neighborhood throws further fuel on the fire by suggesting to each that a spite fence would be a prudent move. As the bell rings to indicate the start of the next "round", the neighbors start building fences on their respective sides of the property line. The fence grows in height as the neighbors chant out "Higher! Higher! Higher!" Muncey begins digging under the foundation of the combined fences, and then begins forcibly punching holes through the bottoms of them while the neighbourhood dogs cheer him on. The foundational damage causes the perilously high fences to crumble and collapse, causing the gathered crowds to scatter.

In the final scene, Pete is shown injured and bandaged up, reluctantly moving away with his house in tow. Donald is declared the winner, but as the camera zooms out, we see Donald is moving away as well, hence making the war between neighbors a draw.

== Voice cast ==
- Clarence Nash as Donald Duck
- Billy Bletcher as Pete

== Television ==
- The Mouse Factory, episode #1.11: "Homeowners"
- The New Mickey Mouse Club (February 8, 1977)
- Good Morning, Mickey, episode #16
- Mickey's Mouse Tracks, episode #47
- Donald's Quack Attack, episode #50
- The Ink and Paint Club, episode #1.32: "Goin' to the Dogs"

== Home media ==
The short was released on November 11, 2008, on Walt Disney Treasures: The Chronological Donald, Volume Four: 1951-1961.

Additional releases include:

- Walt Disney Cartoon Classics: Limited Gold Editions - Donald (VHS)

== Notes ==
- At one point, Pete can be heard humming "Lambert the Sheepish Lion".
- The same bird that was seen in "Little April Shower" from Bambi, can be briefly spotted where he is doing the same movement from the original film and the bird's color is recolored.
