= Spare the Rod (1954 film) =

1954 Donald Duck cartoon

- Theatrical release poster
- Directed by: Jack Hannah
- Story by: Roy Williams; Nick George
- Produced by: Walt Disney
- Starring: Clarence Nash; Bill Thompson; Pinto Colvig
- Music by: Oliver Wallace
- Animation by: Volus Jones; William Justice; George Kreisl; Bob Carlson; Dan MacManus (effects)
- Layouts by: Yale Gracey
- Backgrounds by: Howard Dunn
- Color process: Technicolor
- Production company: Walt Disney Productions
- Distributed by: RKO Radio Pictures
- Release date: January 15, 1954
- Running time: 6:30
- Country: United States
- Language: English

Spare the Rod is a 1954 American animated short film directed by Jack Hannah and produced by Walt Disney, featuring Donald Duck. In the short film, while Donald is doing yard work, his three nephews are playing games instead of doing their chores. He is going to punish them, but the "voice of child psychology" convinces him to play along instead. This works well when they chop the wood to burn him at the stake. Meanwhile, a trio of Pygmy cannibals that escaped from the circus are out to do the very same thing to Donald with a cauldron of water.

== Plot ==
Donald is doing his yard work and expecting his three nephews - they keep sneaking off to play their pretend game, "Indians on the warpath". Then, he uses his typical strong arm tactics to send his nephews to do their chores. Later, a little shoulder professor called "The Voice of Child Psychology" convinces Donald to join in the games, using the game for the nephews' chores. Complicating matters are the cannibals, who have escaped from a circus train. They spot Donald and think he would make great duck stew. Donald mistakes the cannibals for his nephews playing games and plays along until his real nephews play with him, realizing the other three are real cannibals. His nephews take off in fear while the cannibals try to cook Donald, who is praying for his life to be spared until one of the cannibals bites Donald to "taste" him. Donald loses his temper and takes the cannibal out to the woodshed spanking them. Then, the cannibals escape out of Donald's place. While Donald staring at his nephews, he taunted them back to chop their wood for the second time. Ashamed of Donald listening to the "child psychologist" and his poor skills of psychology, he takes him to the woodshed and punishing him as well.

== Voice cast ==
- Clarence Nash as Donald Duck, Huey, Dewey, and Louie
- Bill Thompson as The Voice of Child Psychology
- Pinto Colvig as Pygmy Cannibals

== Censorship ==
Because Spare the Rod depicted racial stereotypes of native Africans via the appearances of the pygmy cannibals, though being also red-nosed anthropomorphic animals, all scenes depicting the cannibals are deleted when shown on television. The censored version of the short is rendered very short, since its runtime has been greatly reduced from 6 minutes (not counting credits) to 2 1/2 minutes.

The fully restored version is available on Walt Disney Treasures: The Chronological Donald, Volume Four.

== Home media ==
The short was released on November 11, 2008, on Walt Disney Treasures: The Chronological Donald, Volume Four: 1951-1961.
