= Canvas Back Duck =

1953 Donald Duck cartoon

- Theatrical release poster
- Directed by: Jack Hannah
- Story by: Jack Kinney; Bill Berg
- Produced by: Walt Disney
- Starring: Clarence Nash; Billy Bletcher; Bob Jackman; Dallas McKennon
- Music by: Oliver Wallace
- Animation by: George Kreisl; Bob Carlson; Volus Jones; Al Coe; Dan MacManus (effects)
- Layouts by: Yale Gracey
- Backgrounds by: Ray Huffine
- Color process: Technicolor
- Production company: Walt Disney Productions
- Distributed by: RKO Radio Pictures
- Release date: December 25, 1953
- Running time: 7 minutes
- Country: United States
- Language: English

Canvas Back Duck is a 1953 Walt Disney animated short film starring Donald Duck, his three nephews, and Pete.

== Plot ==
Donald Duck and his three nephews visit a carnival. While they play games, Donald is tricked by a shifty barker into fighting "Pee Wee Pete" (Pegleg Pete), a truculent bruiser who significantly outweighs Donald. In spite of help from his nephews, the situation looks desperate for Donald, until his fist accidentally connects with Pete's jaw, which breaks as a visual gag for him having a glass jaw and he collapses to the canvas out cold. Donald wins the prize money and exits the carnival triumphantly with his nephews.

== Voice cast ==
- Donald Duck: Clarence Nash
- Pegleg Pete: Billy Bletcher
- Huey, Dewey, and Louie: Clarence Nash
- Trainer: Dallas McKennon and Bob Jackman

== Home media ==
The short was released on November 11, 2008, on Walt Disney Treasures: The Chronological Donald, Volume Four: 1951-1961.
