= Trailer Horn =

1950 Donald Duck cartoon

- Theatrical release poster
- Directed by: Jack Hannah
- Story by: Roy Williams
- Produced by: Walt Disney
- Starring: Clarence Nash /Jimmy MacDonald; Dessie Flynn
- Music by: Paul Smith
- Animation by: Bob Carlson; Volus Jones; Bill Justice
- Layouts by: Yale Gracey
- Backgrounds by: Thelma Witmer
- Production company: Walt Disney Productions
- Distributed by: RKO Radio Pictures, Inc.
- Release date: April 28, 1950
- Running time: 6:30
- Country: United States
- Language: English

Trailer Horn is a 1950 animated short film featuring Donald Duck and Chip 'n' Dale. It was produced by Walt Disney Productions and released by RKO Radio Pictures, Inc.

== Plot ==
Chip 'n' Dale wake up one morning and go out to collect nuts but then come upon Donald Duck (who is out having a nice relaxing vacation)'s footprints. They follow the footprints to his trailer, where they find Donald sleeping (Chip opens Donald's eye to see sheep jumping over a fence and comments "Well what do you know?" then closes it) and begin to jump on the car horn, waking Donald. Angered, he captures Dale, but Chip bites his foot and he screams in pain as they run away. They imitate the scene and laugh hysterically.

Donald comes out of his trailer wearing a swim suit and notices a diving board near the lake. Chip and Dale then mess with the diving board's positioning while he is still on it, causing Donald to land onto the board and later land in his trailer, inevitably making a mess. He figures out the trick, captures the chipmunks, and puts them in the horn and rapidly honks it, then puts them in a pie and tosses it into a tree. Donald laughs at them before he marches back into his trailer to eat breakfast.

Chip then looks up and notices pine cones on a branch. They run up the tree and see Donald eating his breakfast through the hole in the trailer. To the tune of Shave and a Haircut, the chipmunks drop pine cones on his breakfast and his head. Enraged, Donald hops into his car and starts ramming the tree with it until he makes it lean like a catapult. Before Donald can grab them, the chipmunks hop off the tree and, realizing he's doomed, Donald funereally bids farewell before his car is thrown into a cliff and destroyed. Chip and Dale watch from the sidelines as a dazed Donald comes out of the hood with the horn in his mouth and steering wheel in his hands, behaving like a car. He honks his horn repeatedly and "drives" away toward the horizon as the cartoon ends.

== Voice cast ==
- Clarence Nash as Donald Duck
- Jimmy MacDonald as Chip
- Dessie Flynn as Dale

== Home media ==
The short was released on December 11, 2007 on Walt Disney Treasures: The Chronological Donald, Volume Three: 1947-1950.
