= Let's Stick Together (film) =

1952 Donald Duck cartoon

- Theatrical release poster
- Directed by: Jack Hannah
- Story by: Nick George; Al Bertino
- Produced by: Walt Disney
- Starring: Clarence Nash; June Foray; Bill Thompson
- Music by: Oliver Wallace
- Animation by: Bob Carlson; Volus Jones; Bill Justice; George Kreisel; Marvin Woodward
- Layouts by: Yale Gracey
- Backgrounds by: Thelma Whitmer
- Production company: Walt Disney Productions
- Distributed by: RKO Radio Pictures, Inc.
- Release date: April 25, 1952
- Running time: 7 minutes
- Country: United States
- Language: English

Let's Stick Together is a 1952 animated short film featuring Donald Duck and Spike the Bee. It was released by Walt Disney Productions.

== Plot ==
An aged Donald Duck is working as a park custodian. An elderly Spike the Bee lives in a tree, where he is sitting on his rocking chair smoking a pipe. Spike recalls that years ago, he actually worked with Donald, then flashes back to a time when both were young and struggling. Spike had been perusing help wanted ads of a discarded newspaper when Donald claims it for litter. The spiked stick Donald uses to collect garbage inspires Spike to try something, remarking "I had a talent I never knew" and realized that he could use his own stinger to do the same. Spike does Donald's work, which inspires Donald to try new ideas. Donald then sells balloons to children at a carnival while telling Spike to then pop them for unnecessary repeat business, but this comes to an end when Spike also ruins a balloon-dance sideshow. Donald then takes his business to Navy boys when the ship pulls in, where Spike uses his stinger to tattoo them. Realizing that Spike can rapidly switch colors with his stinger, Donald is inspired to try his grand idea of textile production, where Spike is hooked up to a multi-spooler and makes various cloth items. The huge demand wears out Spike, who requests a vacation "somewhere in the country". Donald grants this by providing a greenhouse, to which Spike recalls "that man was a genius, he brought the country to me!".

When a female bee is frolicking in the greenhouse, then Spike falls in love with her, prompting him to deface all the clothes with hearts and messages of love. Angered that his business is ruined, Donald deduces the cause of the problem and attempts to swat the girl bee. Spike then recalls "the thing that brought us together was about to rift us apart", aims his stinger at Donald, and stings him, and recues the female bee.

The scene returns to the present, where Donald approaches Spike about a job. Spike has no interest in that, saying how he has enjoyed wedded bliss for years. Spike's wife then throws pots and pans in a rage, shrewishly ranting how Spike does nothing at home except sit in that rocking chair while she cooks and cleans. Spike then answers Donald "Well, what are you waiting for?" as both run off to resume their business partnership.

== Voice cast ==
- Clarence Nash as Donald Duck
- Bill Thompson as Spike
- June Foray as Spike's wife

== Home media ==
The short was released on November 11, 2008, on Walt Disney Treasures: The Chronological Donald, Volume Four: 1951-1961. It was also later made available to stream on Disney+.
