= Test Pilot Donald =

1951 Donald Duck cartoon

- Theatrical release poster
- Directed by: Jack Hannah
- Story by: Bill Berg; Nick George
- Produced by: Walt Disney
- Starring: Clarence Nash; James MacDonald; Dessie Flynn
- Music by: Paul Smith
- Animation by: Bob Carlson; Volus Jones; Bill Justice; Hal King; Jack Boyd (effects)
- Layouts by: Yale Gracey
- Backgrounds by: Ralph Hulett
- Color process: Technicolor
- Production company: Walt Disney Productions
- Distributed by: RKO Radio Pictures (original); Buena Vista Distribution (reissue)
- Release date: June 8, 1951
- Running time: 7 minutes
- Country: United States
- Language: English

Test Pilot Donald is a 1951 American animated short film featuring Donald Duck and Chip 'n' Dale. The cartoon was directed by Jack Hannah and produced by Walt Disney. In the film, Donald flies his model airplane into Chip 'n Dale's tree. Dale climbs in and proceeds to cause trouble.

== Plot ==
Donald Duck is at the park flying a tether airplane, unaware he is being watched by Chip 'n' Dale. Chip is uninterested, but Dale is mesmerized and dreams of flying the plane. When it gets stuck in their tree, Dale hops aboard and zooms around the tree, but the airplane breaks down and lands. Dale fixes the plane, but Donald puts him under a jug, while Chip disciplines Dale for his foolishness. Dale steals the now-untethered plane and begins chasing and attacking Donald. Donald hooks the plane with a fishing rod, but is pulled along on a wild ride, until he manages to reel himself in and get aboard the plane. Seeing this, Dale parachutes out. The fishing rod gets caught on the roof of a building, making the plane fly around it. Later that night, Chip and Dale go to bed, while watching Donald still circling the building.

== Voice cast ==
- Clarence Nash as Donald Duck
- James MacDonald and Dessie Flynn as Chip and Dale

== Television ==
- Disneyland, episode #3.13: "Your Host, Donald Duck"
- The Mouse Factory, episode #1.14: "Aviation"
- The New Mickey Mouse Club, episodes C-057 (May 6, 1977) and D-072 (April 25, 1978)
- Good Morning, Mickey, episode #66
- Come Fly With Disney
- Mickey's Mouse Tracks, episode #20
- Donald's Quack Attack, episode #63
- The Ink and Paint Club, episode #1.48: "The Return of Chip 'n Dale"

== Home media ==
The short was released on November 11, 2008, on Walt Disney Treasures: The Chronological Donald, Volume Four: 1951-1961.

Additional releases include:

- Walt Disney Cartoon Classics: The Continuing Adventures of Chip 'n' Dale with Donald Duck (VHS), which uses the original opening and closing titles.
