= Chips Ahoy (film) =

1956 Donald Duck cartoon

- Theatrical release poster
- Directed by: Jack Kinney
- Story by: Dick Kinney; Milt Schaeffer
- Produced by: Walt Disney
- Starring: Clarence Nash; Jimmy MacDonald; Dessie Flynn
- Music by: Oliver Wallace
- Color process: Technicolor
- Production company: Walt Disney Productions
- Distributed by: RKO Radio Pictures
- Release date: February 24, 1956; (US)
- Running time: 6:40
- Country: United States
- Language: English

Chips Ahoy is a Walt Disney-produced animated CinemaScope theatrical short. It was released to theaters on February 24, 1956, and was the second to last Disney cartoon to be distributed by RKO Radio Pictures. It is also the second to last regular Disney theatrical cartoon to feature Donald Duck in a starring role and the final appearance of Chip 'n' Dale in The Golden Age of Animation and their final appearance overall, until the 1959 Walt Disney Presents television special "The Adventures of Chip 'n' Dale". It was also re-released to theaters on July 24, 1985 to accompany The Black Cauldron.

== Plot ==
Chip and Dale are both hungry sitting in their tree, surrounded by a huge lake, which has few acorns. After a squabble over their last one, which falls into the lake below, Chip sees a larger tree overflowing with acorns across the way from them, but the lake stands between them and their potential gain.

They spot a ship in a bottle in Donald Duck's fishing shack and decide to use it to attempt to cross the lake. Later, as Donald is taking a stroll along the pier, he spots them carrying the ship and salutes them. He doesn't realize that they have pilfered his ship until he returns to the shack, and sets out to get it back from them.

Donald catches the ship with a fishing pole and reels it in. To get back at Chip and Dale, who have put on miniature costumes and taken on the personas of the ship's captain and a seaman respectively, he torments them with the ship's rudder, filling the cabin with water (forcing them to pump it out), then puts on an imaginary series of stormy weather. The ruse seems to work, as Dale gets seasick. When he leans over the gunwale to vomit, he spots Donald's feet on the ground and alerts Chip to the trick, the pair escaping into the quarters before Donald can get them while slamming his finger in the door. Undeterred, he tricks Dale into getting captured by using a boatswain's call. Chip counters by releasing the ship's anchor right on Donald's foot so that he drops both Dale and the ship.

Dale then ties Donald up and jumps back onto the ship, moments before Donald can free himself. As Chip sees this, he panics terribly and tries to steer the ship away, while Donald begins chasing them. However, Dale is one step ahead of both Chip and Donald and had already cut a hole in Donald's boat sail, drilled holes in his canoe, unscrewed the bolts to dismantle his rowboat, and tied his motorboat to the dock. When his motorboat is halted by the rope, Donald flies out of it and crashes into the tree just as Chip and Dale reach it, filling their hold with acorns. A furious Donald tries one more time to catch them, but falls and causes a wave to carry the ship back to the tree, where they eat their haul of acorns. Undaunted, Donald, now stranded on the island, chops down the tree and tries to build a dugout canoe.

== Voice cast ==
- Donald Duck: Clarence Nash
- Chip: Jimmy MacDonald
- Dale: Dessie Flynn

== Home media ==
The short was released on November 11, 2008 on Walt Disney Treasures: The Chronological Donald, Volume Four: 1951-1961. It was released to Disney+ in 4K High Definition on October 6, 2023.

Additional releases include:

- VHS - A Tale of Two Chipmunks

== Trivia ==
- This short was one of the few times in which Dale, not Chip, outwitted Donald.
