= The Flying Squirrel =

1954 Donald Duck cartoon

- Directed by: Jack Hannah
- Story by: Nick George; Roy Williams
- Produced by: Walt Disney
- Starring: Clarence Nash; Pinto Colvig
- Music by: Oliver Wallace
- Animation by: Bob Carlson; Volus Jones; Bill Justice; Al Coe
- Layouts by: Yale Gracey
- Backgrounds by: Ray Huffine
- Production company: Walt Disney Productions
- Distributed by: RKO Radio Pictures, Inc.
- Release date: November 12, 1954
- Running time: 6:30
- Country: United States
- Language: English

The Flying Squirrel is a 1954 animated short film featuring Donald Duck. It was released by Walt Disney Productions.

== Plot ==
Donald Duck owns a peanut cart and has set up in a park. A flying squirrel comes along and Donald recruits him to help tie his sign to a tree with the promise of a peanut. However, the peanut that Donald gives him turns out to be bad and won't give him another one. This causes the squirrel to start a battle with Donald.

== Voice cast ==
- Clarence Nash as Donald Duck
- Pinto Colvig - The Flying Squirrel (giant peanut barking sounds)

== Home media ==
The short was released on November 11, 2008 on Walt Disney Treasures: The Chronological Donald, Volume Four: 1951-1961.
