= Walt Disney Treasures: Wave Eight =

Digital video disc collection

The eighth wave of Walt Disney Treasures was released on November 11, 2008.

The wave itself was originally going to include a release dedicated to Destino, a short film part of Fantasia 2000 that was once scheduled to be released as a set for the Walt Disney's Legacy Collection series, however, the release was cancelled in both occasions and was replaced by the Mickey Mouse Club Presents: Annette set.

39,500 sets were produced.

== The Chronological Donald, Volume Four ==

This set is the final volume on Donald Duck and contains the remaining Donald shorts and featurettes from 1951-1961. However, this set omits three Chip 'n' Dale solo shorts. It also omits the educational shorts Steel and America (1965) and Donald's Fire Survival Plan (1966), as well as the educational featurette Scrooge McDuck and Money (1967), which featured Uncle Scrooge for the first time in a starring role in animation; he had previously only appeared in the opening title sequence of The Mickey Mouse Club.

The cartoon Bee on Guard is missing the last five seconds of footage for reasons unknown. A few months after its release Disney issued replacement discs correcting this error.

=== Disc one ===
==== 1951 ====
- Dude Duck
- Corn Chips
- Test Pilot Donald
- Lucky Number
- Out of Scale
- Bee on Guard

==== 1952 ====
- Donald Applecore
- Let's Stick Together
- Trick or Treat

==== 1953 ====
- Don's Fountain of Youth
- The New Neighbor
- Working for Peanuts
- Canvas Back Duck

==== From the vault ====
- Uncle Donald's Ants (1952)
- Rugged Bear (1953)

==== Bonus features ====
- Donald Goes to Press
- The Unseen Donald Duck: "Trouble Shooters" (1946)
- Working for Peanuts Audio Commentary by Leonard Maltin and Jerry Beck

=== Disc two ===
==== 1954 ====
- Donald's Diary
- Dragon Around
- Grin and Bear It
- The Flying Squirrel
- Grand Canyonscope (#)

==== 1955 ====
- Bearly Asleep (#)
- Beezy Bear (#)
- Up a Tree

==== 1956 ====
- Chips Ahoy (#)
- How to Have an Accident In the Home (#)

==== 1959 ====
- Donald in Mathmagic Land

==== 1961 ====
- Donald and the Wheel
- The Litterbug

==== From the vault ====
- Spare the Rod (1954)
- No Hunting (1955) (#)
- How to Have An Accident at Work (1959)

(#) = In Cinemascope

==== Bonus features ====
- Grand Canyonscope Audio Commentary by Leonard Maltin and Jerry Beck
- 10 Mickey Mouse Works Cartoons (1999-2000)
  - Bird Brained Donald
  - Donald and the Big Nut
  - Donald's Charmed Date
  - Donald's Dinner Date
  - Donald's Failed Fourth
  - Donald's Rocket Ruckus
  - Donald's Shell Shots
  - Donald's Valentine Dollar
  - Music Store Donald
  - Survival of the Woodchucks

== Dr. Syn: The Scarecrow of Romney Marsh ==

Disc one features the 3 part serial that first aired as part of Walt Disney's Wonderful World of Color, as well as rare TV introductions filmed in a wide-screen format and a documentary about the series. Disc two contains the re-edited theatrical cut for UK audiences, as well as a feature about the series being filmed on location in London, England. This set does not include the re-cut made for the American theatrical release in the 1970s.

=== Disc one ===
==== Television episodes ====
- The Scarecrow of Romney Marsh: Part 1 (First broadcast: February 9, 1964)
- The Scarecrow of Romney Marsh: Part 2 (First broadcast: February 16, 1964)
- The Scarecrow of Romney Marsh: Part 3 (First broadcast: February 23, 1964)

==== Bonus features ====
- Walt Disney TV Introductions in Widescreen
- Dr Syn: The History of a Legend

=== Disc two ===
==== Film ====
- Dr. Syn, Alias The Scarecrow (re-edited theatrical feature-length film version released in the United Kingdom on December 12, 1963)

==== Bonus features ====
- Walt Disney: From Burbank to London

== The Mickey Mouse Club Presents: Annette ==

This set contains every installment of the serial the set is named after. The set also includes two episodes that prominently feature Annette Funicello, and two documentaries about her life, career, and impact on the Walt Disney Company.

=== Disc one ===
==== Episodes ====
- An Introduction (Feb 10, 1958)
- The Newcomer (Feb 11, 1958)
- Annette Meets Jet (Feb 12, 1958)
- An Invitation (Feb 13, 1958)
- The Escort (Feb 14, 1958)
- The Party (Feb 17, 1958)
- Paying The Piper (Feb 18, 1958)
- The Missing Necklace (Feb 19, 1958)
- What Happened At School (Feb 20, 1958)
- Almost A Fight (Feb 21, 1958)

==== Bonus features ====
- The Mickey Mouse Club Episode 296: "Annette - An Introduction" (Original Airdate: Feb 10, 1958)
- Musically Yours, Annette

=== Disc two ===
==== Episodes ====
- Steady Gets An Idea (Feb 24, 1958)
- The Explosion (Feb 25, 1958)
- The Turned Down Invitation (Feb 26, 1958)
- Annette Makes A Decision (Feb 27, 1958)
- The Hayride (Feb 28, 1958)
- The Barbecue (Mar 3, 1958)
- The Fight (Mar 4, 1958)
- The Farewell Letter (Mar 5, 1958)
- Mike To The Rescue (Mar 6, 1958)
- The Mystery Is Solved (Mar 7, 1958)

==== Bonus features ====
- The Mickey Mouse Club Episode 315: "Annette - The Mystery is Solved" (Original Airdate: Mar 7, 1958)
- To Annette With Love
