= Corn Chips =

1951 Donald Duck cartoon

- Theatrical release poster
- Directed by: Jack Hannah
- Story by: Bill Berg; Nick George
- Produced by: Walt Disney
- Starring: Clarence Nash; James MacDonald; Dessie Flynn
- Music by: Oliver Wallace
- Color process: Technicolor
- Production company: Walt Disney Productions
- Distributed by: RKO Radio Pictures
- Release date: March 23, 1951; (USA)
- Running time: 7 minutes
- Country: United States
- Language: English

Corn Chips is a Donald Duck cartoon made by the Walt Disney Animation Studios starring Donald Duck and the chipmunks Chip 'n' Dale. The film was released on March 23, 1951.

== Plot ==
As Donald Duck is clearing snow from his house's walkway, he notices that chipmunks Chip 'n' Dale are busy clearing the snow off their branch. He yanks the branch down to the ground, fooling the chipmunks into clearing his path as well into a hydrant, and then walks into his house, laughing as the chipmunks realize the trick. Annoyed and angered, the chipmunks plan to teach him a lesson, and approach the house where they discover that Donald's trying to pop some popcorn which they plan to steal and eat. While he goes out to collect some firewood, the chipmunks enter the house and try to eat the uncooked popcorn. They aren't able to chew it, and a frustrated Chip kicks some bits of corn into the fireplace, which pops. Donald returns and pops a bowl of popcorn with Chip & Dale inside, but they find a way to steal his bowl. The duck enters a fierce battle with the chipmunks for possession of the popcorn, including swapping its location, and a game of catch, which ends with Donald trying to burn down Chip and Dale's tree. The duo pretend to surrender before seizing the box of popcorn, and pouring the entire box on the fire, causing a massive shower of popcorn to cover Donald's house. Concluding the short, a disgruntled Donald ends up having to clear popcorn out of his walkway.

== Voice cast ==
- Donald Duck: Clarence Nash
- Chip: Jimmy MacDonald
- Dale: Dessie Flynn

== Home media ==
The short was released on November 11, 2008, on Walt Disney Treasures: The Chronological Donald, Volume Four: 1951-1961.
