= Walt Disney Productions short films (1940–1949) =

This is a list of short films created by Walt Disney Animation Studios between the years 1940 and 1949.

== 1940 ==
| Series | Title | Director | Release Date | DVD Release | Notes |
|---|---|---|---|---|---|
| Donald Duck | The Riveter | Dick Lundy | March 15 | "The Chronological Donald" | |
| Donald Duck | Donald's Dog Laundry | Jack King | April 5 | "The Chronological Donald" "Starring Donald" | |
| Mickey Mouse | Tugboat Mickey | Clyde Geronimi | April 26 | "Mickey Mouse in Living Color, Volume Two" "Funny Factory with Mickey "Celebrating Mickey" (Blu-ray) "Mickey & Friends: 10 Classic Shorts" (Blu-ray) | |
| Donald & Goofy | Billposters | Clyde Geronimi | May 17 | "The Chronological Donald" | |
| Donald Duck | Mr. Duck Steps Out | Jack King | June 7 | "The Chronological Donald" "Mickey & Minnie's Sweetheart Stories" "Best Pals: Donald and Daisy" "Mickey & Friends: 10 Classic Shorts" (Blu-ray) | First appearance of Daisy Duck (a precursor called Donna Duck appears in Don Donald). In this cartoon she has the same voice as Donald. |
| Pluto | Bone Trouble | Jack Kinney | June 28 | Old Yeller "The Complete Pluto" | |
| Donald Duck | Put-Put Troubles | Riley Thomson | July 19 | "The Chronological Donald" | |
| Donald Duck | Donald's Vacation | Jack King | August 9 | "The Chronological Donald" "Starring Donald" | |
| Mickey Mouse | Pluto's Dream House | Clyde Geronimi | August 30 | Escape to Witch Mountain "Mickey Mouse in Living Color, Volume Two" | |
| Donald Duck* | The Volunteer Worker | Riley Thomson | September 1 | "The Chronological Donald" "The Chronological Donald, Volume Two" | *Commercial short produced for Community Chest. |
| Donald Duck | Window Cleaners | Jack King | September 20 | "The Chronological Donald" "Funny Factory with Donald" | |
| Mickey Mouse | Mr. Mouse Takes a Trip | Clyde Geronimi | November 1 | "Mickey Mouse in Living Color, Volume Two" ""Funny Factory with Mickey" "Mickey & Minnie: 10 Classic Shorts" (Blu-ray) | |
| Goofy | Goofy's Glider | Jack Kinney | November 22 | "The Complete Goofy" "Funny Factory with Goofy" | First "How to" Goofy cartoon |
| Donald Duck | Fire Chief | Jack King | December 13 | "The Chronological Donald" | |
| Pluto | Pantry Pirate | Clyde Geronimi | December 27 | "The Complete Pluto" | |

== 1941 ==
| Series | Title | Director | Release Date | DVD Release | Notes |
|---|---|---|---|---|---|
| Donald Duck | Timber | Jack King | January 10 | "The Chronological Donald" | |
| Pluto | Pluto's Playmate | Norman Ferguson | January 24 | "The Complete Pluto" | |
| Mickey Mouse | The Little Whirlwind | Riley Thomson | February 14 | "Mickey Mouse in Living Color, Volume Two" "Starring Mickey" "Celebrating Mickey" (Blu-ray) "Mickey & Minnie: 10 Classic Shorts" (Blu-ray) | |
| Donald Duck | Golden Eggs | Wilfred Jackson | March 7 | "The Chronological Donald" "Starring Donald" | |
| Mickey Mouse | A Gentleman's Gentleman | Clyde Geronimi | March 28 | "The Complete Pluto" | |
| Goofy | Baggage Buster | Jack Kinney | April 18 | "The Complete Goofy" "Starring Goofy" | |
| Donald Duck | A Good Time for a Dime | Dick Lundy | May 9 | "The Chronological Donald" | |
| Mickey Mouse | Canine Caddy | Clyde Geronimi | May 30 | "The Complete Pluto" "Extreme Sports Fun" | |
| Mickey Mouse | The Nifty Nineties | Riley Thomson | June 20 | "Mickey Mouse in Living Color, Volume Two"; Pollyanna "Mickey & Minnie's Sweetheart Stories" "Best Pals: Mickey and Minnie" | |
| Donald Duck | Early to Bed | Jack King | July 11 | "The Chronological Donald" | |
| Donald Duck | Truant Officer Donald | Jack King | August 1 | "The Chronological Donald" | |
| Mickey Mouse | Orphans' Benefit | Riley Thomson | August 22 | "Mickey Mouse in Living Color, Volume Two" "Extreme Music Fun" | Remake of the "Orphan's Benefit" black and white cartoon in 1934. Mickey's normal mouse ears. |
| Donald Duck | Old MacDonald Duck | Jack King | September 12 | "The Chronological Donald" "Starring Donald" | |
| Mickey Mouse | Lend a Paw | Clyde Geronimi | October 3 | "The Complete Pluto"; The Fox and the Hound (25th Anniversary); Oliver & Company (20th Anniversary) "Holiday Celebration with Mickey & Pals" | A remake of Disney's 1933 film Mickey's Pal Pluto. |
| Donald Duck | Donald's Camera | Dick Lundy | October 24 | "The Chronological Donald" | |
| Goofy | The Art of Skiing | Jack Kinney | November 14 | "Goofy's Fun House" (PlayStation) "The Complete Goofy" "Starring Goofy" | First use of the Goofy holler. |
| NFBC* | The Thrifty Pig | Ford Beebe | November 19 | "On the Front Lines" | *Produced for National Film Board of Canada, propaganda short encouraging Canadians to buy War Bonds |
| Donald Duck | Chef Donald | Jack King | December 5 | "The Chronological Donald" "Starring Donald" | |
| NFBC* | 7 Wise Dwarfs | Ford Beebe | December 12 | "On the Front Lines" | *Produced for National Film Board of Canada, propaganda short encouraging Canadians to buy War Bonds |
| Goofy | The Art of Self Defense | Jack Kinney | December 26 | "Goofy's Fun House" (PlayStation) "The Complete Goofy" | |

== 1942 ==
| Series | Title | Director | Release Date | DVD Release | Notes |
|---|---|---|---|---|---|
| NFBC – Donald Duck* | Donald's Decision | Ford Beebe | January 11 | "On the Front Lines" | Produced for National Film Board of Canada, propaganda short encouraging Canadians to buy War Bonds |
| NFBC – Mickey Mouse* | All Together | Jack King | January 13 | "On the Front Lines" | Produced for National Film Board of Canada, propaganda short encouraging Canadians to buy War Bonds |
| Donald Duck | The Village Smithy | Dick Lundy | January 16 | "The Chronological Donald, Volume Two" | |
| WAC – Donald Duck* | The New Spirit | Wilfred Jackson | January 23 | "On the Front Lines" | Produced for US Treasury Department. Distributed by War Activities Committee Received an Academy Award Nomination in the Documentary category. |
| Mickey Mouse | Mickey's Birthday Party | Riley Thomson | February 7 | "Mickey Mouse in Living Color, Volume Two" "Celebrating Mickey" (Blu-ray) | Remake of the 1931 black and white short The Birthday Party. |
| Pluto | Pluto Junior | Clyde Geronimi | February 28 | "The Complete Pluto" "Best Pals: Mickey and Pluto" | |
| Mickey Mouse | Symphony Hour | Riley Thomson | March 20 | "Mickey Mouse in Living Color, Volume Two" | |
| Donald Duck | Donald's Snow Fight | Jack King | April 10 | "The Chronological Donald, Volume Two" | |
| Donald Duck | Donald Gets Drafted | Jack King | May 1 | "On the Front Lines" "The Chronological Donald, Volume Two" | |
| Pluto | The Army Mascot | Clyde Geronimi | May 22 | "On the Front Lines" "The Complete Pluto" | |
| Donald Duck | Donald's Garden | Dick Lundy | June 12 | "The Chronological Donald, Volume Two" | |
| Pluto | The Sleepwalker | Clyde Geronimi | July 3 | "The Complete Pluto" | |
| Donald Duck | Donald's Gold Mine | Dick Lundy | July 24 | "The Chronological Donald, Volume Two" | |
| WAC – Pluto* | Out of the Frying Pan and into the Firing Line | Ben Sharpsteen | July 30 | "On the Front Lines" | *Wartime propaganda short starring Pluto and Minnie Mouse. Produced for War Activities Committee |
| Pluto | T-Bone for Two | Clyde Geronimi | August 14 | "The Complete Pluto" | |
| Goofy | How to Play Baseball | Jack Kinney | September 4 | "The Complete Goofy" "Extreme Sports Fun" | |
| Donald Duck | The Vanishing Private | Jack King | September 25 | Bedknobs and Broomsticks (30th Anniversary) "On the Front Lines" "The Chronological Donald, Volume Two" | |
| Goofy | The Olympic Champ | Jack Kinney | October 9 | "The Complete Goofy" "It's a Small World of Fun, Volume 2" | |
| Goofy | How to Swim | Jack Kinney | October 23 | "The Complete Goofy" "Starring Goofy" | |
| Donald Duck | Sky Trooper | Jack King | November 6 | "On the Front Lines" "The Chronological Donald, Volume Two" | |
| Pluto | Pluto at the Zoo | Clyde Geronimi | November 20 | "The Complete Pluto" | |
| Goofy | How to Fish | Jack Kinney | December 4 | "Goofy's Fun House" (PlayStation) "The Complete Goofy" "Starring Goofy" | |
| Donald Duck | Bellboy Donald | Jack King | December 18 | "The Chronological Donald, Volume Two" | |

== 1943 ==
| Series | Title | Director | Release Date | DVD Release | Notes |
|---|---|---|---|---|---|
| Donald Duck | Der Fuehrer's Face | Jack Kinney | January 1 | "On the Front Lines" "The Chronological Donald, Volume Two" | |
| Donald Duck | The Spirit of '43 | Jack King | January 7 | "On the Front Lines" | produced for US Treasury Department |
| —N/a | Education for Death | Clyde Geronimi | January 15 | "On the Front Lines" | |
| Donald Duck | Donald's Tire Trouble | Dick Lundy | January 29 | "The Chronological Donald, Volume Two" | |
| Mickey Mouse and Pluto | Pluto and the Armadillo | Clyde Geronimi | February 19 | "The Complete Pluto" "Best Pals: Mickey and Pluto" | |
| Donald Duck | The Flying Jalopy | Dick Lundy | March 12 | "The Chronological Donald, Volume Two" | |
| Pluto | Private Pluto | Clyde Geronimi | April 2 | "On the Front Lines" "The Complete Pluto" | First appearance of Chip and Dale |
| Donald Duck | Fall Out Fall In | Jack King | April 23 | "On the Front Lines" "The Chronological Donald, Volume Two" | |
| Goofy | Victory Vehicles | Jack Kinney | July 30 | "The Complete Goofy" "On the Front Lines" | |
| —N/a | Reason and Emotion | Bill Roberts | August 27 | "On the Front Lines" | |
| Figaro | Figaro and Cleo | Jack Kinney | October 15 | "The Complete Pluto, Volume Two" "Best Pals: Minnie and Figaro" | |
| Donald Duck | The Old Army Game | Jack King | November 5 | "On the Front Lines" "The Chronological Donald, Volume Two" | |
| Donald Duck | Home Defense | Jack King | November 26 | "On the Front Lines" "The Chronological Donald, Volume Two" | |
| —N/a | Chicken Little | Clyde Geronimi | December 17 | "On the Front Lines" "Disney Rarities: Celebrated Shorts: 1920s–1960s" | |

== 1944 ==
| Series | Title | Director | Release Date | DVD Release | Notes |
|---|---|---|---|---|---|
| —N/a | The Pelican and the Snipe | Hamilton Luske | January 7 | "Disney Rarities: Celebrated Shorts: 1920s–1960s" | This short was reissued by RKO a few years later. |
| Goofy | How to Be a Sailor | Jack Kinney | January 28 | "The Complete Goofy" "On the Front Lines" | |
| Donald Duck | Trombone Trouble | Jack King | February 18 | "The Chronological Donald, Volume Two" | Pete's final appearance until 1952. |
| Goofy | How to Play Golf | Jack Kinney | March 10 | "Goofy's Fun House" (PlayStation) "The Complete Goofy" | |
| Donald Duck | Donald Duck and the Gorilla | Charles Nichols | March 31 | "The Chronological Donald, Volume Two" | First monster film. |
| Donald Duck | Contrary Condor | Jack King | April 21 | "The Chronological Donald, Volume Two" "Funny Factory with Donald" | |
| Donald Duck | Commando Duck | Jack King | May 5 | "On the Front Lines" "The Chronological Donald, Volume Two" | |
| Pluto | Springtime for Pluto | Charles Nichols | June 23 | "The Complete Pluto" | The first Disney short with opening credits. |
| Donald Duck | The Plastics Inventor | Jack King | September 1 | "The Chronological Donald, Volume Two" | |
| Goofy | How to Play Football | Jack Kinney | September 15 | "The Complete Goofy" "Extreme Sports Fun" | |
| Pluto | First Aiders | Charles Nichols | September 22 | "The Complete Pluto" "Best Pals: Mickey and Minnie" | |
| Donald Duck | Donald's Off Day | Jack Hannah | December 8 | "The Chronological Donald, Volume Two" "Funny Factory with Hewey, Dewey & Louie" | |

== 1945 ==
| Series | Title | Director | Release Date | DVD Release | Notes |
|---|---|---|---|---|---|
| Goofy | Tiger Trouble | Jack Kinney | January 5 | "The Complete Goofy" "It's a Small World of Fun, Volume 3" | |
| Donald Duck | The Clock Watcher | Jack King | January 26 | "The Chronological Donald, Volume Two" "Holiday Celebration with Mickey & Pals" | |
| Pluto | Dog Watch | Charles Nichols | March 16 | "The Complete Pluto" | |
| Donald Duck | The Eyes Have It | Jack Hannah | March 30 | "Return from Witch Mountain" "The Chronological Donald, Volume Two" | |
| Goofy | African Diary | Jack Kinney | April 20 | "The Complete Goofy" "It's a Small World of Fun, Volume 1" | |
| Donald Duck | Donald's Crime | Jack King | June 29 | "The Great Mouse Detective" "The Chronological Donald, Volume Two" "Best Pals: Donald and Daisy" | |
| Educational | Californy'er Bust | Jack Kinney | July 13 | "The Complete Goofy" | Starring Goofy. |
| Pluto | Canine Casanova | Charles Nichols | July 27 | "The Complete Pluto" | |
| Donald Duck | Duck Pimples | Jack Kinney | August 10 | "The Chronological Donald, Volume Two" | |
| Pluto | The Legend of Coyote Rock | Charles Nichols | August 24 | "The Complete Pluto" | |
| Donald & Goofy | No Sail | Jack Hannah | September 7 | "The Chronological Donald, Volume Two" "Extreme Adventure Fun" | |
| Goofy | Hockey Homicide | Jack Kinney | September 21 | "The Complete Goofy" | |
| Donald Duck | Cured Duck | Jack King | October 26 | "The Chronological Donald, Volume Two" "Best Pals: Donald and Daisy" | |
| Pluto | Canine Patrol | Charles Nichols | December 7 | "The Complete Pluto" | |
| Donald Duck | Old Sequoia | Jack King | December 21 | "The Chronological Donald, Volume Two" "Extreme Adventure Fun" | |

== 1946 ==
| Series | Title | Director | Release Date | DVD Release | Notes |
|---|---|---|---|---|---|
| Goofy | A Knight for a Day | Jack Hannah | March 8 | The Sword in the Stone "The Complete Goofy" | |
| Pluto | Pluto's Kid Brother | Charles Nichols | April 12 | "The Complete Pluto" | |
| Pluto | In Dutch | Charles Nichols | May 10 | "The Complete Pluto" "Mickey & Minnie's Sweetheart Stories" "It's a Small World of Fun, Volume 1" | |
| Mickey Mouse | Squatter's Rights | Jack Hannah | June 7 | "The Complete Pluto" | |
| Donald Duck | Donald's Double Trouble | Jack King | June 28 | The Parent Trap "The Chronological Donald, Volume Two" "Mickey & Minnie's Sweetheart Stories" "Best Pals: Donald and Daisy" | |
| Pluto | The Purloined Pup | Charles Nichols | July 19 | "The Complete Pluto" | |
| Pluto* | A Feather in his Collar | Charles Nichols | August 7 | "Disney Rarities: Celebrated Shorts: 1920s–1960s" | *Commercial short starring Pluto, not part of Pluto film series. Produced for Community Chest |
| Donald Duck | Wet Paint | Jack King | August 9 | "The Chronological Donald, Volume Two" | |
| Donald Duck | Dumb Bell of the Yukon | Jack King | August 30 | "The Chronological Donald, Volume Two" | |
| Donald Duck | Lighthouse Keeping | Jack Hannah | September 20 | Pete's Dragon "The Chronological Donald, Volume Two" | |
| Figaro | Bath Day | Charles Nichols | October 11 | "The Complete Pluto, Volume Two"; The Aristocats "Best Pals: Mickey and Minnie" "Mickey & Minnie: 10 Classic Shorts" (Blu-ray) | |
| Donald & Goofy | Frank Duck Brings 'Em Back Alive | Jack Hannah | November 1 | "The Chronological Donald, Volume Two" | |
| Goofy | Double Dribble | Jack Hannah | December 20 | "The Complete Goofy" "Extreme Sports Fun" | |

== 1947 ==
| Series | Title | Director | Release Date | DVD Release | Notes |
|---|---|---|---|---|---|
| Pluto | Pluto's Housewarming | Charles Nichols | February 21 | "The Complete Pluto" "Best Pals: Mickey and Pluto" | |
| Pluto | Rescue Dog | Charles Nichols | March 21 | "The Complete Pluto, Volume Two" "Holiday Celebration with Mickey & Pals" | |
| Donald Duck | Straight Shooters | Jack Hannah | April 18 | "The Chronological Donald, Volume Three" "Funny Factory with Hewey, Dewey & Louie" | |
| Donald Duck | Sleepy Time Donald | Jack Kinney | May 9 | "The Chronological Donald, Volume Three" "Best Pals: Donald and Daisy" | |
| Figaro | Figaro and Frankie | Charles Nichols | May 30 | "The Complete Pluto, Volume Two" "Best Pals: Mickey and Minnie" "Mickey & Minnie: 10 Classic Shorts" (Blu-ray) | Final cartoon Produced in the Figaro series. |
| Donald Duck | Clown of the Jungle | Jack Hannah | June 20 | "The Chronological Donald, Volume Three" | |
| Donald Duck | Donald's Dilemma | Jack King | July 11 | "The Chronological Donald, Volume Three" "Extreme Music Fun" | |
| Donald & Goofy | Crazy with the Heat | Bob Carlson | August 1 | "The Chronological Donald, Volume Three" "It's a Small World of Fun, Volume 2" | Final pairing of Donald and Goofy. |
| Donald Duck | Bootle Beetle | Jack Hannah | August 22 | "The Chronological Donald, Volume Three" | |
| Donald Duck | Wide Open Spaces | Jack King | September 12 | "The Chronological Donald, Volume Three" | |
| Mickey Mouse | Mickey's Delayed Date | Charles Nichols | October 3 | "Mickey Mouse in Living Color, Volume Two" "Mickey & Minnie's Sweetheart Stories" "Best Pals: Mickey and Minnie" "Mickey & Minnie: 10 Classic Shorts" (Blu-ray) | |
| Goofy | Foul Hunting | Jack Hannah | October 31 | "The Complete Goofy" | |
| Pluto | Mail Dog | Jack Hannah | November 14 | "The Complete Pluto, Volume Two" | |
| Donald Duck | Chip an' Dale | Jack Hannah | November 28 | "The Chronological Donald, Volume Three" "Starring Chip 'n' Dale" | First cartoon to co-star Donald Duck and Chip n Dale. |
| Pluto | Pluto's Blue Note | Charles Nichols | December 26 | "The Complete Pluto, Volume Two" "Extreme Music Fun" | |

== 1948 ==
| Series | Title | Director | Release Date | DVD Release | Notes |
|---|---|---|---|---|---|
| Goofy | They're Off | Jack Hannah | January 23 | "The Complete Goofy" | |
| Goofy | The Big Wash | Clyde Geronimi | February 6 | "Goofy's Fun House" (PlayStation) "The Complete Goofy" "Starring Goofy" | |
| Donald Duck | Drip Dippy Donald | Jack King | March 5 | "The Chronological Donald, Volume Three" | |
| Mickey Mouse | Mickey Down Under | Charles Nichols | March 19 | "Mickey Mouse in Living Color, Volume Two" "It's a Small World of Fun, Volume 1" | |
| Donald Duck | Daddy Duck | Jack Hannah | April 16 | "The Chronological Donald, Volume Three" "Funny Factory with Donald" | |
| Pluto | Bone Bandit | Charles Nichols | April 30 | "The Complete Pluto, Volume Two" | |
| Donald Duck | Donald's Dream Voice | Jack King | May 21 | "The Chronological Donald, Volume Three" "Best Pals: Donald and Daisy" | |
| Pluto | Pluto's Purchase | Charles Nichols | July 9 | "The Complete Pluto, Volume Two" | |
| Donald Duck | The Trial of Donald Duck | Jack King | July 30 | "The Chronological Donald, Volume Three" | |
| Pluto | Cat Nap Pluto | Charles Nichols | August 13 | "The Complete Pluto, Volume Two" "Best Pals: Mickey and Pluto" | |
| Donald Duck | Inferior Decorator | Jack Hannah | August 27 | "The Chronological Donald, Volume Three" "Starring Donald" | |
| Pluto | Pluto's Fledgling | Charles Nichols | September 10 | "The Complete Pluto, Volume Two" "Best Pals: Mickey and Pluto" | Re-released in theaters with Return to Never Land (2002). |
| Donald Duck | Soup's On | Jack Hannah | October 15 | "The Chronological Donald, Volume Three" "Funny Factory with Hewey, Dewey & Louie" | |
| Donald Duck | Three for Breakfast | Jack Hannah | November 2 | "The Chronological Donald, Volume Three" "Starring Chip 'n' Dale" | |
| Mickey Mouse | Mickey and the Seal | Charles Nichols | December 3 | "Mickey Mouse in Living Color, Volume Two" "Funny Factory with Mickey" | Re-released in theaters with Cheetah (1989). |
| Donald Duck | Tea for Two Hundred | Jack Hannah | December 24 | "The Chronological Donald, Volume Three" | |

== 1949 ==
| Series | Title | Director | Release Date | DVD Release | Notes |
|---|---|---|---|---|---|
| Pluto | Pueblo Pluto | Charles Nichols | January 14 | "The Complete Pluto, Volume Two" "Best Pals: Mickey and Pluto" "It's a Small World of Fun, Volume 3" | |
| Donald Duck | Donald's Happy Birthday | Jack Hannah | February 11 | "The Chronological Donald, Volume Three" | |
| Pluto | Pluto's Surprise Package | Charles Nichols | March 4 | "The Complete Pluto, Volume Two" | Final appearance of Shelby Turtle. |
| Donald Duck | Sea Salts | Jack Hannah | April 8 | "The Chronological Donald, Volume Three" | |
| Pluto | Pluto's Sweater | Charles Nichols | April 29 | "The Complete Pluto, Volume Two" "Best Pals: Mickey and Minnie" "Mickey & Friends: 10 Classic Shorts" (Blu-ray) | Final appearance of Figaro, the cat |
| Donald Duck | Winter Storage | Jack Hannah | June 3 | "The Chronological Donald, Volume Three" "Mickey's Christmas Carol" "Mickey & Friends: 10 Classic Shorts" (Blu-ray) | |
| Pluto | Bubble Bee | Charles Nichols | June 24 | "The Complete Pluto, Volume Two" | |
| Donald Duck | Honey Harvester | Jack Hannah | August 5 | "The Chronological Donald, Volume Three" | |
| Goofy | Tennis Racquet | Jack Kinney | August 26 | "The Complete Goofy" "Extreme Sports Fun" | First appearance of new designer look Goofy character |
| Donald Duck | All in a Nutshell | Jack Hannah | September 2 | "The Chronological Donald, Volume Three" | |
| Goofy | Goofy Gymnastics | Jack Kinney | September 23 | "The Complete Goofy" "Extreme Sports Fun" | |
| Donald Duck | The Greener Yard | Jack Hannah | October 14 | "The Chronological Donald, Volume Three" | |
| Pluto | Sheep Dog | Charles Nichols | November 4 | "The Complete Pluto, Volume Two" | |
| Donald Duck | Slide, Donald, Slide | Jack Hannah | November 25 | "The Chronological Donald, Volume Three" | |
| Donald Duck | Toy Tinkers | Jack Hannah | December 16 | "The Chronological Donald, Volume Three" "Holiday Celebration with Mickey & Pals" | |

== Wartime and industrial shorts ==
| Series | Title | Director | Release Date | DVD Release | Notes |
|---|---|---|---|---|---|
| —N/a | Four Methods of Flush Riveting | | ?.?. 1942 | "On the Front Lines" | Produced for the National Film Board of Canada. |
| —N/a | Food Will Win the War | | July 21, 1942 | "On the Front Lines" | Produced for U.S. Department of Agriculture |
| —N/a | Stop That Tank! (aka: Boys Anti-Tank Rifle) | Ub Iwerks | ?.?.1942 | "On the Front Lines" | Produced for the National Film Board of Canada |
| —N/a | The Grain That Built a Hemisphere | Bill Roberts | January 4, 1943 | "On the Front Lines" | Produced for Coordinator of Inter-American Affairs; Received an Academy Award Nomination in the Documentary category. |
| —N/a | Water, Friend or Enemy | Clyde Geronimi | April 6, 1943 | —N/a | Produced for Coordinator of Inter-American Affairs. |
| —N/a | Defense Against Invasion | | August 11, 1943 | "On the Front Lines" | Produced for Coordinator of Inter-American Affairs; Produced on higher budget than most other shorts produced for Coordinator of Inter-American Affairs. |
| —N/a | The Winged Scourge | Bill Roberts | November 5, 1943 | "On the Front Lines" | Produced for Coordinator of Inter-American Affairs; Featuring the Seven Dwarfs |
| —N/a | The Right Spark Plug in the Right Place | | February 12, 1945 | —N/a | Produced for Electric Auto-Lite Company. |
| —N/a | Prevention and Control of Distortion in Arc Welding | | April 12, 1945 | —N/a | Produced for Lincoln Electric Company |
| —N/a | The Dawn of Better Living | | May 28, 1945 | —N/a | Produced for Westinghouse Electric |
| —N/a | Something You Didn't Eat | | June 11, 1945 | —N/a | Produced for Cereal Institute |
| Health for the Americas | Hookworm | | June 30, 1945 | —N/a | Produced for Coordinator of Inter-American Affairs |
| Health for the Americas | Insects as Carriers of Disease | | June 30, 1945 | —N/a | Produced for Coordinator of Inter-American Affairs |
| Health for the Americas | Cleanliness Brings Health | | June 30, 1945 | "On the Front Lines" | Produced for Coordinator of Inter-American Affairs |
| Health for the Americas | Infant Care and Feeding | | July 31, 1945 | —N/a | Produced for Coordinator of Inter-American Affairs |
| —N/a | Hold Your Horsepower | | August 8, 1945 | —N/a | Produced for The Texans Company |
| Health for the Americas | Tuberculosis | | August 13, 1945 | —N/a | Produced for Coordinator of Inter-American Affairs; First film made for the Health for the Americas series alternative version is known to exist. |
| Health for the Americas | The Human Body | | August 13, 1945 | —N/a | Produced for Coordinator of Inter-American Affairs |
| Health for the Americas | What Is Disease? [a.k.a. The Unseen Enemy] | | August 13, 1945 | "On the Front Lines" | Produced for Coordinator of Inter-American Affairs |
| Health for the Americas | How Disease Travels | | August 22, 1945 | —N/a | Produced for Coordinator of Inter-American Affairs |
| —N/a | Light Is What You Make It | | December 3, 1945 | —N/a | Produced for National Better Light Better Sight Bureau |
| —N/a | The ABC of Hand Tools | | February 5, 1946 | —N/a | Produced for General Motors |
| —N/a | The Building of a Tire | | February 14, 1946 | —N/a | Produced for Firestone Tire and Rubber Company |
| —N/a | Bathing Time For Baby | | March 12, 1946 | —N/a | Produced for Johnson & Johnson |
| Health for the Americas | Planning For Good Eating | | April 3, 1946 | "On the Front Lines" | Produced for Coordinator of Inter-American Affairs |
| Health for the Americas | Environmental Sanitation | | April 3, 1946 | —N/a | Produced for Coordinator of Inter-American Affairs |
| —N/a | Treasure from the Sea | | September 30, 1946 | —N/a | Produced for Dow Chemical Company |
| —N/a | The Story of Menstruation | | October 18, 1946 | —N/a | produced for Kimberly-Clark and International Cellu-Cotton Company |
