= Donald Duck's 50th Birthday =

- Logo used by Disney in the birthday tour and the CBS television special.
- Written by: Peter Elbling; Andrew Solt
- Directed by: Andrew Solt; Phil Savenick
- Starring: Dick Van Dyke; Clarence Nash; John Harlan
- Music by: Paul J. Smith; John Debney
- Country of origin: United States
- Original language: English

Production
- Producer: Andrew Solt
- Running time: 60 min
- Production companies: Andrew Solt Productions; Walt Disney Pictures Television

Original release
- Network: CBS
- Release: November 13, 1984

Related
- Mickey's 60th Birthday

Donald Duck's 50th Birthday is a television special broadcast on November 13, 1984, on CBS. As the title suggests, it was produced to celebrate the 50th anniversary of the Donald Duck character, who first appeared in the Walt Disney short The Wise Little Hen in 1934.

Donald is shown in both animated and live costumed form, interacting with emcee Dick Van Dyke and other cast members. The film not only shows Donald's life, but also depicts an extensive international tour that Donald went on in 1984. Various celebrities of the day send Donald birthday greetings, including Ed Asner, Andy Warhol, Donna Summer and the Star Wars droids. The tour culminates in a parade in Donald's honor at Disneyland.

This was the last time Clarence Nash voiced Donald Duck before his death in 1985. It was rebroadcast on Disney Channel Europe on November 13, 2004, to celebrate the 20th anniversary of the special plus at the end of the special, it has the sign: "Walt Disney 1901–1966 Clarence Nash 1904–1985".

== Features ==
- Star Wars characters R2-D2 and C-3PO explain that clarity of speech are qualities that are vital to future languages and that those who do not possess such qualities are doomed. They then add that there are exceptions to that rule, case in point, Donald's famed speech impediment, created by Clarence Nash, which they claim they know very well. C-3PO closes out this scene by saying, "Happy birthday, Mr. Duck. And Mr. Nash".
- Acclaimed artist Andy Warhol is shown finishing and hanging, The New Spirit a painting that was created for Donald's golden jubilee.
- There several scenes with Walt Disney, one with Donald Duck hiding under Disney's desk blotter despite the pleas of Disney to meet the people that had come to see him (from a Disneyland episode entitled "The Plausible Impossible"), another with Donald demonstrating the techniques of animation and sound effects and a third with Donald as a puppet with Disney was receiving a Master of Arts (the joke being that it was in fact Donald who received the degree).
- The Mickey Mouse Club theme is shown with Disney characters to illustrate Donald's innate jealousy to Mickey Mouse having his own television show. Dick Van Dyke states that Donald "never let anyone forget it".
- There is a film clip with Daisy Duck baking a cake for Donald featuring the 1980 Donald Duck song "Going Quackers" with various Donald Duck and other Disney character toys doing a dance number using stop motion animation as well as reverse acting.

== 1984 birthday tour ==
In 1984, Donald Duck (in live form) went on an international tour through Europe, Japan and parts of the United States. Some of these stops on his tour actual stage performances attended by other (live) Disney characters. Donald's arrival at airports (on his own plane depicting Donald in flight on the tailfin) was met with colossal crowds that kept getting bigger. There were also several parades for Donald, and not just at the Disney theme parks. In one, Donald sat in a staff car in his military uniform and was promoted to the rank of sergeant. This scene was also when he was discharged from the US Army. Donald is also shown having his footprints cast in cement at Grauman's Chinese Theatre in May 1984.

In the film, Donald's tour is shown with music as well as dialogue, assumedly added later by Clarence Nash.

== Cast ==
- Dick Van Dyke ... Host
- Edward Asner ... Himself
- Bruce Jenner (Note: Jenner changed her name to Caitlyn Jenner due to gender transition in 2015.) ... Himself
- Cloris Leachman ... Herself
- Kenny Rogers ... Himself
- Donna Summer ... Herself
- Andy Warhol ... Himself
- Henry Winkler ... Himself
- John Ritter ... Himself
- Anthony Daniels ... C-3PO
- Kenny Baker ... R2-D2
- Clarence Nash ... Donald Duck / Himself
- John Harlan ... Announcer

Also featured is Walt Disney in several clips (Disney himself having died in 1966).

== Featured clips ==
- The Wise Little Hen (1934)
- The Band Concert (1935)
- Don Donald (1937)
- Lonesome Ghosts (1937)
- Donald's Nephews (1938)
- Donald's Golf Game (1938, shown in French)
- Donald's Better Self (1938, shown in Japanese)
- The Autograph Hound (1939)
- The Riveter (1940)
- Mr. Duck Steps Out (1940)
- Window Cleaners (1940)
- The Reluctant Dragon (1941)
- Old Mac Donald Duck (1941)
- Der Fuehrer's Face (1942)
- Donald Gets Drafted (1942)
- Bellboy Donald (1942)
- Saludos Amigos (1942)
- The Three Caballeros (1944)
- Commando Duck (1944)
- Donald's Crime (1945, shown in Spanish)
- Fun and Fancy Free (1947)
- Donald's Dream Voice (1948)
- Bee at the Beach (1950)
- Canvas Back Duck (1953)
- Donald's Diary (1954)
- "The Mickey Mouse Club" (1955)
- "Disneyland: A Day in the Life of Donald Duck (#2.18)" (1956)
- "Disneyland: The Plausible Impossible (#3.8)" (1956)
- Donald in Mathmagic Land (1959)
- "Disneyland: Inside Donald Duck (#8.6)" (1961)
- Mickey's Christmas Carol (1983, shown in Swedish)

== Soundtrack ==
The Donald Duck's 50th Birthday

EP by various artists
- Released: November 1, 1984
- Recorded: 1984
- Genre: Various
- Length: Unknown
- Label: Disneyland
- Producer: Uncredited

Singles from The Donald Duck's 50th Birthday Album
- 1. "Happy, Happy Birthday to You (Donald Duck Version)" Released: 1984; 2. "Going Quackers" Released: 1985; 3. "Can You Quack Like Donald Duck?" Released: 1986; 4. "Tutti Frutti" Released: 1987; 5. "The Army's Not the Army Anymore" Released: 1988; 6. "Donald Duck Theme" Released: 1989

- "Happy, Happy Birthday to You (Donald Duck Version)" by Michael Silversher & Patty Silversher (1984)
- "Going Quackers" (1980)
- "Can You Quack Like Donald Duck?" by Michael Silversher & Patty Silversher (1984)
- "Tutti Frutti" by Little Richard (1955)
- "The Army's Not the Army Anymore" (first shown in the 1942 short Donald Gets Drafted)
- "Donald Duck Theme" by the Disney chorus

Happy, Happy Birthday to You (Donald Duck Version) was released on the Splashdance LP and cassette. Splashdance has since been re-released on compact disc.
