= Commando Duck =

1944 Donald Duck cartoon

- Theatrical release title card
- Directed by: Jack King
- Story by: Jack Hannah
- Produced by: Walt Disney
- Starring: Clarence Nash
- Music by: Oliver Wallace
- Animation by: Ward Kimball; Milt Kahl; Norman Tate; Dick Lundy
- Layouts by: Tom Codrick
- Color process: Technicolor
- Production company: Walt Disney Productions
- Distributed by: RKO Radio Pictures
- Release date: June 2, 1944
- Running time: 7 minutes
- Country: United States
- Language: English

Commando Duck is a Walt Disney anti-Japanese propaganda cartoon starring Donald Duck. It was released on June 2, 1944.

== Plot ==
Donald Duck parachutes into the jungle of a remote Pacific island to wipe out a Japanese airfield undetected. He loses most of his equipment in the process of landing and is nearly eaten by a pair of crocodiles. He uses a rubber raft to travel down the river. He is located by Japanese snipers, including one disguised as a rock and one disguised as a slant-eyed and buck-toothed tree. He initially mistakes their bullets for mosquitoes and presses onwards.

His raft is caught beneath a waterfall and starts inflating. He makes sure the raft hits nothing that would pop it. When he gets to the edge of a cliff, he sees the airfield. The raft has already exploded, causing water to turn into a waterfall. The water ends up flooding the entire airfield, destroying everything in its path including all of the aircraft. A montage of all the broken aircraft after the flood. Upon seeing the ruins of the airfield, a proud Donald declares his mission accomplished by sign a message quote: "Contacted enemy, washed out same".

== Voice cast ==
- Clarence Nash as Donald Duck
- Eddie Holden as Japanese Snipers

== Analysis ==
Due to the short being made in World War II, when the United States was at war with the Empire of Japan, the cartoon expresses blatant anti-Japanese sentiment which is now seen as racist.

However, the focus of the short is mostly on Donald and his efforts in combat and less on the racial aspects of the enemy. This has allowed the short to be broadcast to modern audiences with most of the Japanese references removed.

There are Japanese caricatures and depictions of the Imperial Japanese Military. There is also a reference to Japanese emperor Hirohito. The Japanese soldiers speak in stereotypical dialect and advocate firing the first shot at a man's back.

The gag with the enemy soldier disguised as a tree can be traced back to Shoulder Arms (1918). It was also used in A Lecture on Camouflage (1944). It was later utilized by the Indians during their battle with the Lost Boys in the 1953 Disney animated feature Peter Pan as well.

Though earlier war-era shorts (e.g. Donald Gets Drafted, The Vanishing Private, etc.) depict Donald's experiences and training as a regular U.S. Army draftee and infantry private, the commando mission and Pacific Theater of Operations setting in this short are seemingly 6th Ranger Battalion or Paramarine/Marine Raider-inspired.

This is the only film which depicts a regular Disney character engaging with the enemy at war.

== Home media ==
The short was released on May 18, 2004 on Walt Disney Treasures: Walt Disney on the Front Lines and on December 6, 2005 on Walt Disney Treasures: The Chronological Donald, Volume Two: 1942-1946.

== Sources ==
- Akita, Kimiko; Kenney, Rick (2013), "A "Vexing Implication": Siamese Cats and Orientalist Mischief-Making", in Cheu, Johnson (ed.), Diversity in Disney Films: Critical Essays on Race, Ethnicity, Gender, Sexuality and Disability, McFarland & Company, ISBN 978-0786446018
- Leskosky, Richard J. (2011), "Cartoons Will Win the War: World War II Propaganda Shorts", in Van Riper, Bowdoin (ed.), Learning from Mickey, Donald and Walt: Essays on Disney's Edutainment Films, McFarland & Company, ISBN 978-0786484751
- Shull, Michael S.; Wilt, David E. (2004), "Filmography 1944", Doing Their Bit: Wartime American Animated Short Films, 1939-1945, McFarland & Company, ISBN 978-0786481699
- Shull, Michael S.; Wilt, David E. (2004), "Private Snafu Cartoons", Doing Their Bit: Wartime American Animated Short Films, 1939-1945, McFarland & Company, ISBN 978-0786481699
