= Walt Disney Treasures: Wave Five =

DVD collections

The fifth wave of Walt Disney Treasures was released on December 6, 2005. Starting with this wave the DVD cases are now single opening, but the same size as the previous. 125,000 sets were produced.

== The Chronological Donald, Volume Two ==

This set covers the second leg of Donald Duck's long career, from 1942 to 1946, including World War II. Most international releases of this set do not include the bonus feature "From the Vault". Six of the eight cartoons are instead included in the main list of shorts, while the shorts Commando Duck and Der Fuehrer's Face are absent. The omission of these shorts has not been explained. Also omitted from the international release is the short Donald's Crime, but this omission was probably a mistake, as all versions of The Great Mouse Detective DVD include it. The Chronological Donald, Volume Two did not receive the beautiful restoration of Volume One. Prints are worn and the image quality is visibly worse than all earlier Disney Treasures Volumes.

=== Disc one ===
==== 1942 ====
- Bellboy Donald
- The Village Smithy
- Donald's Snow Fight
- Donald's Garden
- Donald's Gold Mine

==== 1943 ====
- Donald's Tire Trouble
- The Flying Jalopy

==== From the vault ====
This section was not entirely included on international releases.

===== 1942 =====
- Donald Gets Drafted
- The Vanishing Private
- Sky Trooper

Sky Trooper is included on the disc twice; the second is resolution-compromised.

===== 1943 =====
- Der Fuehrer's Face
- Fall Out - Fall In
- The Old Army Game
- Home Defense

===== 1944 =====
- Commando Duck

==== Bonus feature ====
- A Day in the Life of Donald Duck: This is a 1956 episode of the Disney anthology series showing Donald as he struggles through a typical day at the Walt Disney Studios. In the process, he meets up with Jimmie Dodd, Roy Williams, the Mouseketeers and even his own voice and alter ego, Clarence Nash himself.

=== Disc two ===
==== 1944 ====
- Trombone Trouble
- The Plastics Inventor
- Donald's Off Day
- Donald Duck and the Gorilla
- Contrary Condor

==== 1945 ====
- The Eyes Have It
- Donald's Crime
- Duck Pimples
- No Sail
- Cured Duck
- The Clock Watcher
- Old Sequoia

==== 1946 ====
- Donald's Double Trouble
- Wet Paint
- Dumb Bell of the Yukon
- Lighthouse Keeping
- Frank Duck Brings 'Em Back Alive

==== Bonus features ====
- Drawing and Talking 'Duck' with Tony Anselmo: Maltin meets with Tony Anselmo, the voice of Donald since the mid-1980s.
- The Art and Animation of Carl Barks: Carl Barks is best known for the Donald Duck comics. Various relevant people give their thoughts on the man and his work, emphasizing his influence on DuckTales and films such as Raiders of the Lost Ark.
- The Volunteer Worker: A short from 1940. Donald tries to collect money for charity. This was on the first Donald set as a hidden Easter egg.
- Timeline: The War Years, 1941–1945: Shows a variety of things that had come out of Disney during these years, using clips and captions in the style of a newsreel.
- Galleries: An assortment of concept art, storyboard sketches and background paintings from the various Donald shorts on this set.

== Disney Rarities: Celebrated Shorts: 1920s–1960s ==

This set covers many miscellaneous cartoons to come out of the studio that do not feature the usual stable of Disney stars, do not fit into a particular series like Silly Symphonies, or did not feature the Silly Symphonies title card. This set also includes a few select episodes from the Alice Comedies, which were made in the 1920s in the years leading up to Mickey Mouse's debut.

=== Disc one ===
==== Alice Comedies ====
- Alice's Wonderland (1923)
- Alice's Wild West Show (1924)
- Alice Gets in Dutch (1924)
- Alice's Egg Plant (1925)
- Alice in the Jungle (1925)
- Alice's Mysterious Mystery (1926)
- Alice the Whaler (1927)

==== One-shots ====
- Ferdinand the Bull (1938)
- Chicken Little (1943)
- The Pelican and the Snipe (1944)
- The Brave Engineer (1950)
- Morris the Midget Moose (1950)
- Lambert the Sheepish Lion (1952)
- The Little House (1952)
- Adventures in Music: Melody (1953)
- Football Now and Then (1953)
- Adventures in Music: Toot, Whistle, Plunk and Boom (1953)
- Ben and Me (1953)

==== Bonus features ====
- Alice's Cartoon World: An Interview with Virginia Davis: Leonard Maltin interviews Virginia Davis, who portrayed the little girl, Alice, in Walt's silent comedies of the 1920s
- From Kansas City to Hollywood: A Timeline of Disney's Silent Era: A featurette about Walt Disney's journey into the entertainment industry, from an ad company in Kansas City up to the discovery of synchronized sound.

=== Disc two ===
==== Shorts ====
- Pigs Is Pigs (1954)
- Social Lion (1954)
- Hooked Bear (1956)
- Jack and Old Mac (1956)
- In the Bag (1956)
- A Cowboy Needs a Horse (1956)
- The Story of Anyburg U.S.A. (1957)
- The Truth About Mother Goose (1957)
- Paul Bunyan (1958)
- Noah's Ark* (1959)
- Goliath II (1960)
- The Saga of Windwagon Smith (1961)
- A Symposium on Popular Songs** (1962)

(*): Stopmotion
(**): Combination of Stop-motion and traditional animation

==== Bonus features ====
- Audio Commentary: Heard over A Symposium On Popular Songs, Leonard Maltin interviews Richard M. Sherman who with his brother Robert wrote the songs for the short as well as several Disney films and theme park attractions from the 1960s–2000s.
- A Feather in His Collar (1946): Pluto demonstrates donating to his local community chest.
- Galleries: An assortment of concept art, storyboard sketches and background paintings from some of the cartoons on this DVD set.

== The Adventures of Spin & Marty (The Mickey Mouse Club) ==

This set contains the entire Adventures of Spin and Marty serial, which was first broadcast on the Mickey Mouse Club in 1955. 125,000 sets were produced.

=== Disc One ===
==== Episodes ====
- The Triple-R (November 7, 1955)
- The Misfit (November 8, 1955)
- The White Stallion (November 9, 1955)
- Froggy Day (November 10, 1955)
- The Battle (November 11, 1955)
- A Surprise Decision (November 14, 1955)
- Homesick (November 15, 1955)
- Logan's Lesson (November 16, 1955)
- The Chase (November 17, 1955)
- Ride-'Em-Cowboy (November 18, 1955)

==== Bonus features ====
- The Mickey Mouse Club episode 25: The Adventures of Spin & Marty - An Introduction (November 4, 1955)
- Tim Considine's Screen Test
- Galleries

=== Disc Two ===
==== Episodes ====
- The Snipe Hunt (November 21, 1955)
- The Secret Ride (November 22, 1955)
- Tragedy (November 23, 1955)
- Perkin's Decision (November 24, 1955)
- Tossing the Calf (November 25, 1955)
- Rope Artist (November 28, 1955)
- Nothing Happens on a Sunday (November 29, 1955)
- Perkins and the Bear (November 30, 1955)
- The Runaway (December 1, 1955)
- Haunted Valley (December 2, 1955)
- The Live Ghost (December 5, 1955)
- The Big Rodeo (December 6, 1955)
- Off on the Wrong Foot (December 7, 1955)
- Sky Rocket's Trick (December 8, 1955)
- The Last Campfire (December 9, 1955)

==== Bonus features ====
- Return to the Triple-R
- Back in the Saddle with Harry Carey, Jr.

== Elfego Baca and the Swamp Fox: Legendary Heroes ==

This set contains a selection of episodes from the two adventure series from Walt Disney anthology series.

=== Disc one ===
Disc one contains three of the 10 episodes of the television serial The Nine Lives of Elfego Baca.

==== Episodes ====
- The Nine Lives of Elfego Baca (Episode 1) October 3, 1958
- Four Down and Five Lives to Go (Episode 2) October 17, 1958
- Attorney at Law (Episode 5) February 6, 1959

==== Bonus features ====
- The Many Lives of Robert Loggia
- Galleries

=== Disc two ===
Disc two contains the first three of eight episodes of the television serial The Swamp Fox.

==== Episodes ====
- The Birth of the Swamp Fox (Episode 1) October 23, 1959
- Brother Against Brother (Episode 2) October 30, 1959
- Tory Vengeance (Episode 3) January 1, 1960

==== Bonus feature ====
- Walt Disney Presents Heroes of the American Frontier
