= Buddy the Detective =

1934 film by Jack King

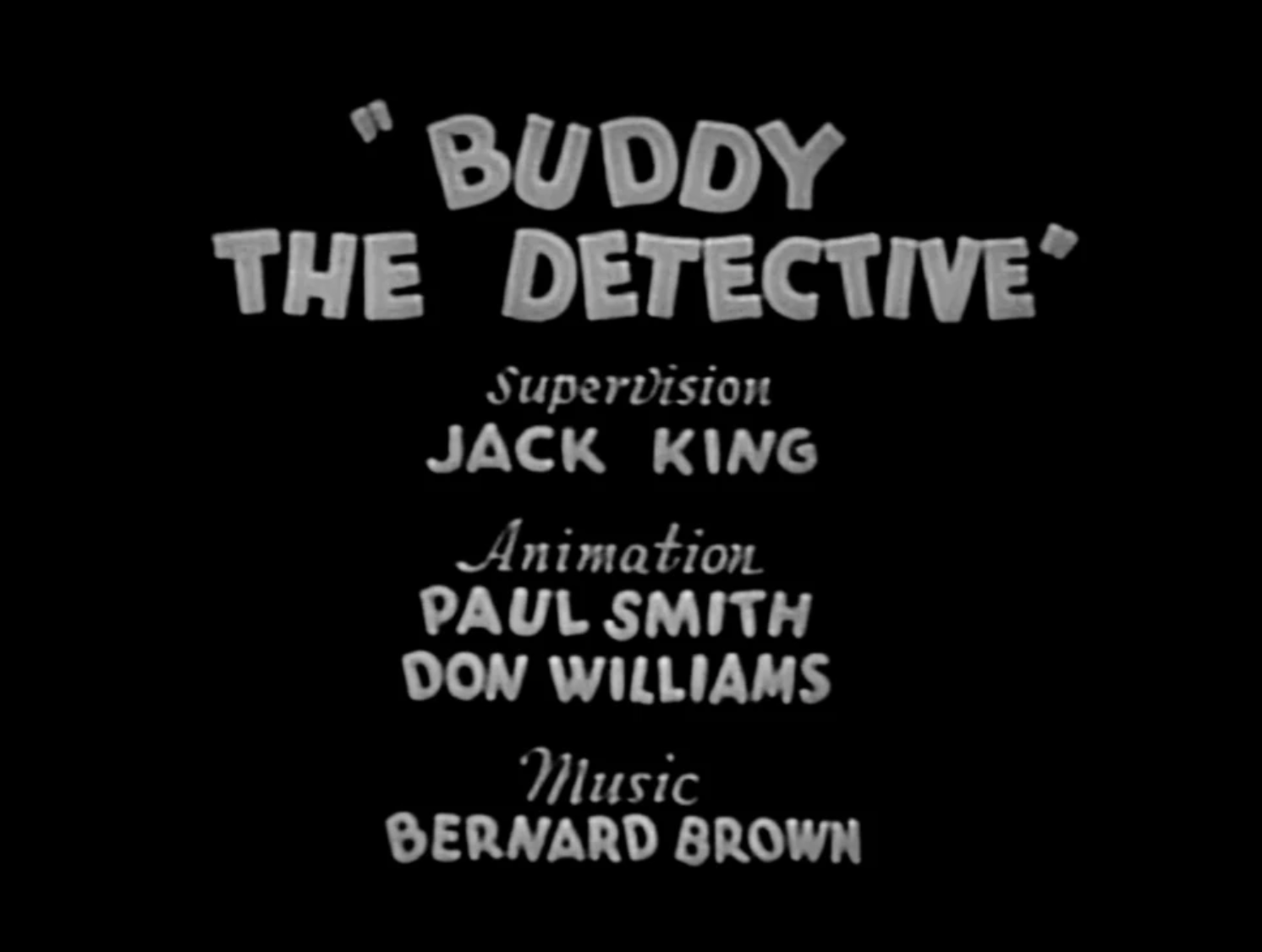
- Title card
- Directed by: Jack King
- Produced by: Leon Schlesinger
- Starring: Jack Carr; Bernice Hansen; Billy Bletcher (all uncredited)
- Music by: Bernard Brown
- Animation by: Paul Smith; Don Williams
- Color process: Black-and-white
- Production company: Leon Schlesinger Productions
- Distributed by: Warner Bros. Productions; The Vitaphone Corporation
- Release date: October 17, 1934
- Running time: 8 minutes
- Country: United States
- Language: English

Buddy the Detective is a 1934 American animated comedy short film directed by Jack King. The short was released on October 17, 1934. It is the 48th film in the Looney Tunes series and the tenth cartoon to feature Buddy.

== Plot ==
The Mad Musician plays Rachmaninoff's Prelude in C-sharp minor, Op. 3, No. 2. on the piano. He uses magic to make a tree and a frog in his wine glass to play the piano, but frustrate him by playing popular music instead which he despises. The Musician bewitches a portrait of Napoleon to play the violin, only for the violin to break to the Mad Musician's chagrin.

It is then revealed that the Mad Musician had escaped prison as seen in a newspaper Cookie reads. He retrieves a phone book, selects a random person, which happens to be Cookie, and dials her phone number. He uses magic to manipulate Cookie, only for her to resist, but not enough to stop her from succumbing to the magic and sleepwalking out of the house. Towser is also hit by the magic, but he immediately leaves for Buddy and slams him to the ground to get his attention. Buddy realizes that Cookie is in trouble and bolts out of his room, donning an outfit resembling Sherlock Holmes's and leaves.

The Mad Musician manipulates Cookie to play the piano for him, but is still dissatisfied as she plays popular music yet again. Meanwhile, Buddy finds a haunted house and cuts a hole so he can go inside. A spider makes noise on Buddy's flashlight that he confuses with Towser. At the next room, a gremlin appears every time Buddy uses his flashlight. Towser is horrified and Buddy chases him to find a walking skeleton, who drinks water from a dispenser and leaves the house. He is spooked by the noise of Towser assaulting a skeleton and stealing his foot, while the skeleton gives chase on crutches. The stairs expand and contract upon the skeleton's steps, while Towser breaks the stairs on his side. The skeleton is launched forward and shatters. Towser runs back with a curtain, dragging Buddy with him to another room.

Buddy sees Cookie, confirming that it is indeed the Mad Musician's refuge, who is then taken by the Mad Musician again to Buddy's fury. The Mad Musician locks his door, so Buddy simply places another door next to it and enters, kicking the Mad Musician's buttocks only for it to knock himself down. Buddy then kicks the Mad Musician to the original door, where they are both flung back into the room. Buddy attempts a sneak attack but is caught by the Mad Musician while he contorts his body in an impossible manner, so Buddy uses this to his advantage and throws the Mad Musician to the wall, incapacitating him and keeping him still with his piano chair. The Mad Musician wakes up to hear Bosko rescuing Cookie and play popular music with her, much to his terror.
