= The Fire Alarm =

1936 film by Jack King

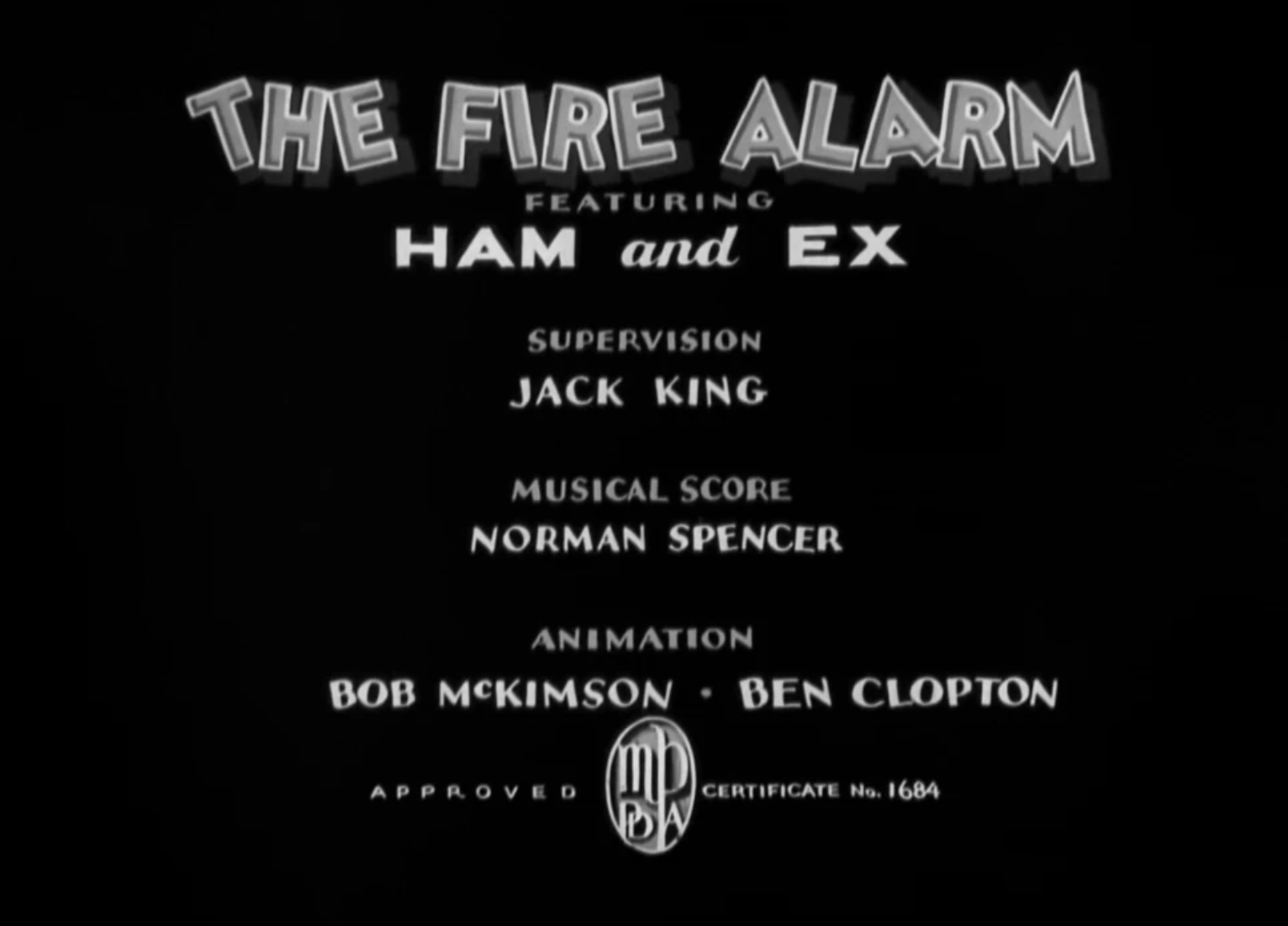
- Title card
- Directed by: Jack King
- Produced by: Leon Schlesinger
- Starring: Billy Bletcher; Bernice Hansen
- Music by: Norman Spencer
- Animation by: Paul Smith; Ben Clopton
- Color process: Black-and-white
- Production company: Leon Schlesinger Productions
- Distributed by: Warner Bros. Productions; The Vitaphone Corporation
- Release date: March 9, 1936
- Running time: 6 min
- Country: United States
- Language: English

The Fire Alarm is a 1936 American animated comedy short film directed by Jack King. It is the 67th film in the Looney Tunes series and the seventh cartoon to star Beans, as well as the third to feature Ham and Ex.

== Plot ==
While firefighter Beans fixes his fire engine, his sister-in-law Lizzie sends her children Ham and Ex to the fire station to be cared of while she goes shopping. As soon as Beans begrudgingly lets them enter, they begin to fight over a fireman helmet, one of which is then launched and jams his head in a boot. The other twin hits him with the shoestrap before saving him, only to have his head jammed in the same boot. One tries to pull a hatchet from a fire engine while the other plays with the hose and runs it across the fire engine, only to be flung across the room and into a stove Bean is using when the other twin pulls a lever. The other twin also slips on a wet sponge and sprays water on his brother and Beans.

Annoyed by their shenanigans, Beans has them seated on a bench. They find the fire alarm next to the bench, so they press the button in hopes that Beans will leave them alone. Inevitably, the false alarm wakes up Beans' co-workers, who have been resting, and alerts them to a futile task. The firefighters return angrily, with Beans grounding them in the sleeping quarters. The twins waste no time in jumping across the beds and getting their heads jammed in the light before dropping onto the fire engine for a joyride, much to Beans' horror. They destroy electrical poles, mow a small area of greenery, knock down a Napoleon statue, destroy a house and flip a tram upside down. They return to the fire station and pretending to be asleep, not realizing that Beans is aware of the situation and fed up of their vandalism. They throw a boot at Beans and dance, only for Beans to exploit their vulnerability and spank them as punishment.
