= The Phantom Ship (film) =

1936 film by Jack King

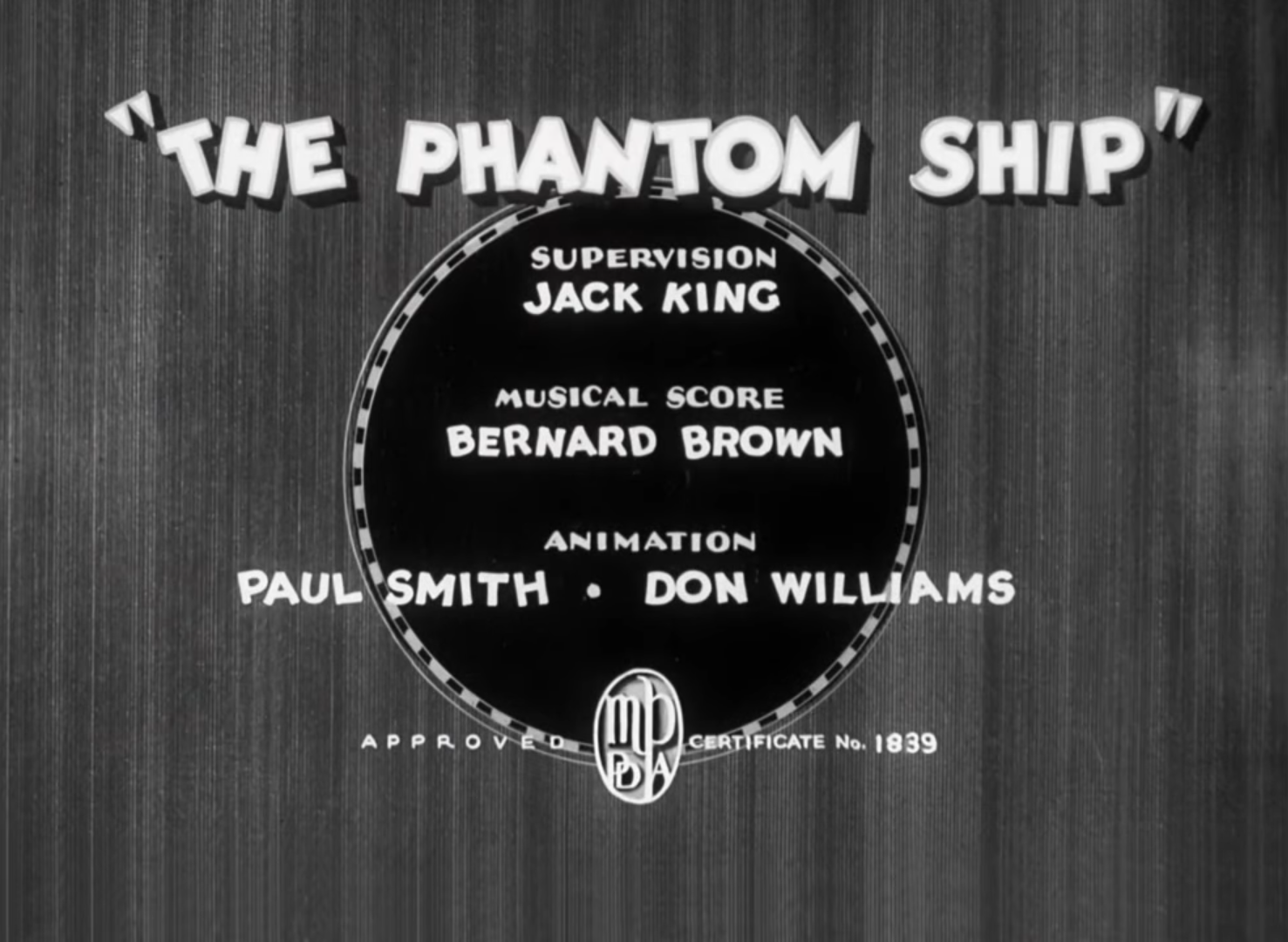
- Title card
- Directed by: Jack King
- Produced by: Leon Schlesinger
- Starring: Tommy Bond; Bernice Hansen
- Music by: Bernard Brown
- Animation by: Paul Smith; Don Williams
- Color process: Black-and-white
- Production company: Leon Schlesinger Productions
- Distributed by: Warner Bros. Productions; The Vitaphone Corporation
- Release date: February 1, 1936
- Running time: 7 minutes
- Country: United States
- Language: English

The Phantom Ship is a 1936 animated comedy short film directed by Jack King. It is the 64th film in the Looney Tunes series and the fourth cartoon to star Beans, as well as the second to feature Ham and Ex.

== Plot ==
Beans is preparing his airplane for his trip to explore an old galleon the Arctic. Reading about it in a press release and wanting to join him, his nephews Ham and Ex hide in the backseats. Beans himself finally hops in and flies the aircraft from New York to Russia, and eventually Iceland, where the temperature rapidly drops as he approaches. Beans arrives at the Arctic, parking his plane just near the frozen ship. He is flabbergasted when he finds Ham and Ex emerging, though he begrudgingly takes them along.

What seems to be stairs turns out to be a reversing elevator while a ghost knocks them into the ship. Ghostly sails toss Beans around while a stick figure sends Beans into a hole, where a lamp launches him further in. Ham and Ex find a skeleton, which they are horrified of; they hide in a piece of cloth and are tangled in it, one stands on another to navigate and scares the skeleton who believes them to be a ghost. The duo are launched through another skeleton into a living hull, which swallows them and sends them tumbling into Beans. Sniffing the cloth, they decide a threat is under the cloth and beats it with planks, until they find Beans underneath.

Beans enters a room where he finds a great amount of treasure. He throws bags of treasure into his plane, while heating chairs sit by what seems to be two frozen corpses. Unbeknownst to him, the two people, a captain and his subordinate, wake up after being thawed. Ham and Ex hide in a barrel while the captain chases Beans, only to get his peg leg stuck in a hole. The subordinate chases Ham and Ex, only to run into a pillar. The captain recovers his leg and attempts to remove the floor plank, only to be launched upward into Beans' location. He punches Beans into a pipe, only for him to emerge behind him and knock him out. Ham and Ex are chased onto a rope, which the subordinate cuts, and they swing just in time to reach the plane and fly it. Meanwhile, Beans is launched upward by a powder keg, but Ham and Ex manage to reverse the plane to catch him. He thanks and embraces Ham and Ex as they fly off to safety.
