= Modern Inventions =

1937 Donald Duck cartoon

- "Your hat, sir."
- Directed by: Jack King
- Story by: Carl Barks
- Produced by: Walt Disney
- Starring: Clarence Nash; Billy Bletcher; Adriana Caselotti; Don Brodie
- Music by: Oliver Wallace
- Animation by: Jack Hannah; Paul Allen; Johnny Cannon
- Color process: Technicolor
- Production company: Walt Disney Productions
- Distributed by: United Artists
- Release date: May 29, 1937
- Running time: 8:30
- Country: United States
- Language: English

Modern Inventions is a 1937 American animated short film produced by Walt Disney Productions and released by United Artists. It was released as part of the Silly Symphonies series. It is also the final Disney short to be released by United Artists. In the cartoon, Donald Duck tours the fictional Museum of Modern Marvels. Jack King directed it in his first directing role at Disney, and Oliver Wallace composed the original music. The voice cast includes Clarence Nash as Donald, Billy Bletcher as the Robot Butler, Adriana Caselotti as the Robot Baby Carriage, and Don Brodie as the Robot Barber.

== Plot ==
Donald visits the Museum of Modern Marvels, which showcases futuristic electronic appliances and inventions. He drops a coin on a string in the admission box and yanks it out. Once inside, he meets the Robot Butler, a brass cyclops. The butler is programmed to greet guests and take their hats, but it has a flaw where it takes their hats whether they want to or not. It takes Donald's hat over his protest, but Donald does a magic trick to produce a top hat. He encounters a robot hitchhiker exhibit that thumbs a ride when he imitates a passing car, then pokes him in the eyes for tricking it. The butler appears and takes his top hat, but he does another magic trick to produce a bicorne.

Donald finds a bundle wrapping machine. He ignores a sign that says not to touch it and pulls a lever, causing the machine to wrap him with cellophane and a red ribbon. After he frees himself, the butler appears and takes his bicorne. He does a magic trick to produce a kepi and taunts the butler, who chases him. He hides in a robotic baby carriage and swaps his kepi with a bonnet. The carriage coddles him, tickles him, and offers a milk bottle, which squirts milk at his face. As he tries to escape, the carriage thrashes him with a puppet toy, squirts more milk, and puts a diaper on him. When he finally gets free, the butler appears and takes his bonnet.

After he does another magic trick to produce a bowler hat, he finds a robotic barber chair that he activates by using his coin. It tosses him upside-down and trims his tail while giving his head a shoe-polish. After he is released, he puts his bowler hat on his well-polished head. However, the butler appears and takes his bowler hat. Fed up with the butler taking his hats, he throws an explosive tantrum.

== Production ==
The story was originally conceived as Mickey's Inventions, a vehicle for Donald's co-star Mickey Mouse. As Donald's star began to rise in 1936, the short was reworked as a duck cartoon.

== Voice cast ==
=== Uncredited ===
- Clarence Nash as Donald Duck
- Billy Bletcher as Robot Butler
- Adriana Caselotti as Robot Baby Carriage
- Don Brodie as Robot Barber Chair

== Releases ==
- May 29, 1937 - original release (theatrical)
- c. 1992 - Mickey's Mouse Tracks, episode 7 (TV)
- c. 1992 - Donald's Quack Attack, episode 30 (TV)
- December 24, 1997 - Ink & Paint Club, episode 26: "Classic Donald" (TV)

== Home media ==
The short was released on May 18, 2004, on Walt Disney Treasures: The Chronological Donald, Volume One: 1934-1941.

It was also released on VHS in 1985 on Cartoon Classics: The Continuing Adventures of Chip 'n' Dale Featuring Donald Duck.

== Legacy ==
The cartoon would later serve as inspiration for suicide booths, fictional contraptions appearing in the American adult animated sitcom Futurama.

In an episode of the series House of Mouse, Minnie Mouse asks Goofy for the name of the cartoon. Goofy knows which Donald Duck cartoon she is talking about, but does not remember the name. Donald mistakenly tells them that the cartoon is called Donald's Haircut and made in 1945, only for Mickey Mouse to correct him.

== See also ==
- Mickey Mouse (film series)
- Donald Duck (film series)
