= Buddy Steps Out =

1935 film by Jack King

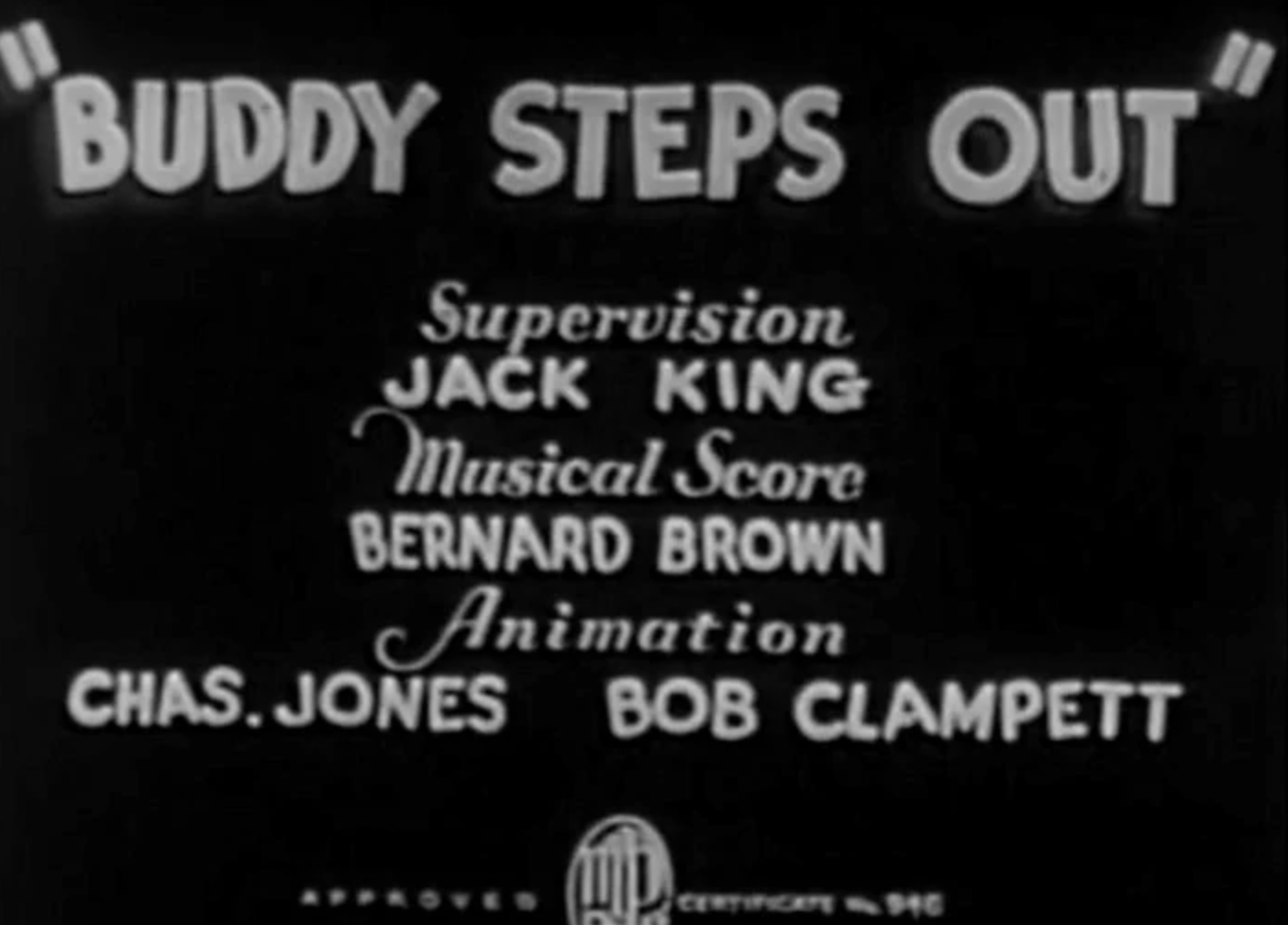
- Title card
- Directed by: Jack King
- Produced by: Leon Schlesinger
- Starring: Bernice Hansen
- Music by: Bernard Brown
- Animation by: Chas. Jones; Bob Clampett
- Color process: Black-and-white
- Production company: Leon Schlesinger Productions
- Distributed by: Warner Bros. Productions; The Vitaphone Corporation
- Release date: July 20, 1935
- Running time: 6 minutes
- Country: United States
- Language: English

Buddy Steps Out is an American animated comedy short film directed by Jack King. It was released on July 20, 1935. It is the 59th film in the Looney Tunes series and the 22nd cartoon to feature Buddy. It is the final appearance of Cookie.

== Plot ==
Cookie prepares for a date with Buddy on a snowy day and sings "About a Quarter to Nine" with her canary. As Buddy arrives to greet her and leaves together, the canary wastes no time to escape, but is blown back by a snowy breeze. Meanwhile, the wind blows into Cookie's house and almost topples a photograph of Buddy, who comes to life to close the window, but is almost blown out until the assistance of a statue of Atlas saves him.

The canary regrets its decision and returns to the house, where it pecks the window to notify Buddy, who alerts Atlas to lift the window and brings the canary in. The canary's feet is frozen shut, so Buddy carries it to the other side of the room using windowsills and places it on a metal statue with a plate, which Buddy heats to melt the ice and resuscitate the canary, who sneezes and accidentally makes music through the handkerchief. The canary kisses Buddy as thanks and starts up the radio, with Buddy and some other mascots tap dancing to the beat. An alarm clock notifies them of Buddy and Cookie's return, as the copy of Buddy, all toys and mascots return to their original place. As Cookie enters the house and Buddy bids her good night, she kisses Buddy's photograph to his pleasure.
