= Donald's Cousin Gus =

1939 Donald Duck cartoon

- Theatrical release poster
- Directed by: Jack King
- Story by: Jack Hannah; Carl Barks
- Produced by: Walt Disney
- Starring: Clarence Nash; Lee Millar
- Music by: Oliver Wallace
- Animation by: Dick Lundy
- Color process: Technicolor
- Production company: Walt Disney Productions
- Distributed by: RKO Radio Pictures
- Release date: May 19, 1939 (U.S.)
- Running time: 7 minutes
- Language: English

Donald's Cousin Gus is a Walt Disney cartoon released on May 19, 1939. Gus Goose debuted as a recurring character in Al Taliaferro's Donald Duck newspaper comic since May 9, 1938.

This cartoon was also the first-ever pre-recorded program (in this case, film) to be televised in the United States, airing as part of NBC's "first night" of sponsored programming on May 3, 1939, sixteen days before the film was released in theaters.

The short was directed by Jack King, and animated by Lee Morehouse, Wolfgang Reitherman, and Don Towsley. The story was created by Jack Hannah and Carl Barks.

== Plot ==
Gus Goose comes to visit his cousin Donald Duck, interrupting him in the middle of lunch. Gus brings a note from Aunt Fanny, which reads, "Dear Nephew, this is your cousin Gus Goose. I'm sending him to visit you ― Love, Aunt Fanny. P.S., He don't eat much". Donald welcomes his cousin, who shakes hands with him frantically.

Gus shows Donald Duck his pocket alarm clock, which is divided into, "Dinner, tea, supper, lunch." Donald remarks to the audience, "Well, I'll be doggone!" Gus Goose proceeds to eat Donald out of house and home. He slurps up Donald's soup with two spoons, eats a corn on the cob like a typewriter, shuffles a whole stack of bread and luncheon meat like cards and swallows them all, knits a bowl of spaghetti into a sock, and slurps it all up. Donald Duck is amused at first, but when Gus steals a loaf of bread from him and dips it into his coffee, eats an entire chocolate cake, steals all of his donuts with his umbrella, and sucks up all of the peas with a straw, Donald gets fed up. Enraged, Donald tries to evict Gus by handcart, but ends up out on the lawn himself.

Hoping to get the jump on Gus, Donald finds a "barking hotdog" in his icebox, with the label, "A sure way to get rid of hungry relatives." Smirking, Donald offers the hotdog to Gus, who gulps it down. Donald starts acting like a cat, stirring up the "dog" in Gus' stomach. Donald then makes Gus lie down and roll over like a dog. Having driven Gus away by throwing a bone out onto the lawn, he bolts and locks the door with a drawbar, laughing. However, his joy turns to shock when he hears Gus come back in through the back door, and discovers a Gus-shaped hole, and discovers him eating cold lunch in his refrigerator, with the time, "Cold Lunch" on his pocket alarm clock. Donald Duck, shocked, exclaims, "Boy! Oh, boy!" and faints on the floor.

== Voice cast ==
- Donald Duck: Clarence Nash
- Barking Hot Dog: Lee Millar
- Gus Goose: Jimmy MacDonald (sound effects)

== Legacy ==
=== Film ===
- Gus Goose also made non-speaking cameo appearances in both Mickey's Christmas Carol and Who Framed Roger Rabbit.

=== Television ===
- Gus Goose made no appearances in DuckTales, but there is a background character in the series, Vacation Van Honk, who looks similar to him.
- Gus Goose appeared in the 2000s animated series Disney's House of Mouse, as the club's gluttonous chef, speaking only in honks rather than words.
- The friend and neighbor Gustav Goose from Quack Pack is probably not the same as Cousin Gus since there are very few similarities, aside from the name and general size of the character.
- Gus Goose also appears in the 2016 Mickey Mouse Christmas special Duck the Halls.

=== Comics ===
- Gus Goose appears in Disney comics, usually shown living as a farmhand on Grandma Duck's farm outside of Duckburg. Along with his gluttony, Gus is quite lazy, often doing little if any work on Grandma's farm. He also has a tendency of falling asleep at random occasions, sometimes even standing up. On occasion, Gus has even shown signs of ingenuity as to finding methods or solutions to make his chores much easier for him and at times even automating them so he does not have to work at all.
- Some confusion is also caused by the German comic book version of Gladstone Gander being referred to as "Gustav Gans" ("Gustav Goose").
- In Danish comic book stories, Gus Goose has appeared as the boyfriend of a classy and rich anthropomorphic swan named Cissy Swann. In Italy, a nephew of his named Pepper appeared in two stories.

== Home media ==
=== VHS ===
- Cartoon Classics: Limited Gold Editions: Donald (United States)
- Donald Duck Geht in die Luft, Drei Caballeros im Sambafieber, Goofy und Pluto Total Verrückt, and Mit Mir Nicht (Germany)
- Disney Parade 3 (France)
- Paperino, Sono Io ... Paperino, Cartoons Disney 6 (Italy)

=== Laserdisc ===
Hello Donald, Donald: Limited Gold Edition, and Disney Cartoon Festival 3 (Japan)

=== DVD ===
The short was released on May 18, 2004, on Walt Disney Treasures: The Chronological Donald, Volume One: 1934-1941.

=== Streaming ===
The short was released to Disney+ on August 11, 2023.

== Television ==
- The Ink and Paint Club, episode 21: "Goin' to the Birds"
- Mickey's Mouse Tracks, episode 77
- Disneyland, episode: The Plausible Impossible
