= Wet Paint (1946 film) =

1946 Donald Duck cartoon

- Theatrical release poster
- Directed by: Jack King
- Story by: Roy Williams
- Produced by: Walt Disney
- Starring: Clarence Nash
- Music by: Oliver Wallace
- Animation by: Bill Justice; Hal King; Sandy Strother; Don Towsley
- Layouts by: Ernie Nordli
- Backgrounds by: Howard Dunn
- Color process: Technicolor
- Production company: Walt Disney Productions
- Distributed by: RKO Radio Pictures
- Release date: August 9, 1946
- Running time: 6:38
- Country: United States
- Language: English

Wet Paint is a 1946 American animated short film directed by Jack King and produced by Walt Disney, featuring Donald Duck. In the short film, Donald re-paints his car, and a bird lands on it. In the mayhem that ensues, the car ends up covered with handprints, spotted a dozen different colors, stripped of paint, and covered with the stuffing from the seats so that it resembles a sheepdog.

== Plot ==
Donald's brand new paint job on his car is threatened by a bird that only wants a thread for its nest.

== Voice cast ==
- Clarence Nash as Donald Duck

== Home media ==
The short was released on December 6, 2005, on Walt Disney Treasures: The Chronological Donald, Volume Two: 1942-1946.
