= Walt Disney Treasures: Wave Three =

The third wave of Walt Disney Treasures dvd collections

The third wave of Walt Disney Treasures was released on May 18, 2004. It was originally planned to be released in December 2003, but was delayed for almost half a year in order to meet an increased demand with a higher number of tins produced. This wave was the first to have a certificate of authenticity with the individual number of the tin on it, replacing the number embossed on the tin. This was the final wave released with side straps.

== Mickey Mouse in Living Color, Volume Two ==

This set picks up from where Mickey Mouse in Living Color, Volume One leaves off. This was one of the few "Treasures" sets to have an international release (on April 4, 2005). Like the first volume, it was retitled Mickey Mouse in Living Colour in the UK due to American and British English spelling differences.

175,000 sets were produced.

=== Disc one ===
==== 1939 ====
- Society Dog Show
- The Pointer

==== 1940 ====
- Tugboat Mickey
- Pluto's Dream House
- Mr. Mouse Takes a Trip

==== 1941 ====
- The Little Whirlwind
- The Nifty Nineties
- Orphan's Benefit

==== 1942 ====
- Mickey's Birthday Party
- Symphony Hour

==== 1947 ====
- Mickey's Delayed Date

==== 1948 ====
- Mickey Down Under
- Mickey and the Seal

==== 1951 ====
- Plutopia
- R'coon Dawg

==== 1952 ====
- Pluto's Party
- Pluto's Christmas Tree

==== 1953 ====
- The Simple Things

==== Bonus features ====
- The Sorcerer's Apprentice: The full cartoon from Fantasia (without the closing segment of Mickey shaking hands with conductor Leopold Stokowski), plus an alternative version, in pencil tests, of Mickey attacking the broom with an axe (in the finished product, viewers see only their shadows).
- Mickey and the Beanstalk: The entire sequence from Fun and Fancy Free, complete with the intertwined live action footage of Edgar Bergen, Luana Patten and Bergen's two ventriloquist dummies, Charlie McCarthy and Mortimer Snerd.
- Walt Disney's Standard Parade For 1939: An Easter egg bonus about a promotion made especially for Standard Oil dealers.
- Walt Disney Performing the Voice of Mickey: An Easter egg bonus showing Walt Disney reading as Mickey Mouse with Billy Bletcher, the voice of Black Pete. The dialogue is for the short "Mr. Mouse Takes a Trip."

=== Disc two ===
==== 1983 ====
- Mickey's Christmas Carol

==== 1990 ====
- The Prince and the Pauper

==== 1995 ====
- Runaway Brain

==== Bonus features ====
- Mickey's Cartoon Comeback: Maltin interviews animators Mark Henn and Andreas Deja, who discuss their first exposure to animation and Mickey.
- The Voice Behind the Mouse: Maltin meets the current voices of Mickey and Minnie, Wayne Allwine and Russi Taylor. They compare how Mickey's voice changed over the years, including Walt Disney's tenure.
- Mouse Mania: A stop-motion segment from a 1978 prime time TV special celebrating Mickey's 50th anniversary, created by animator Mike Jittlov.
- Mickey's Cartoon Physics: An excerpt from The Plausible Impossible, a 1956 episode of the Walt Disney anthology series. Walt discusses how impossible action can seem real in animation if there is some factual basis. We see why it makes sense for a cow's bell to ring when you pull its tail, how Mickey stretches and squishes when going up in an elevator. (The full episode is included on Wave 2's "Behind the Scenes" set.)
- Tricks of Our Trade: An excerpt from Tricks of Our Trade, a 1957 episode of the anthology series. Walt discusses three-dimensionality in cel animation, using the multi-plane camera. (The full episode is included on Wave 2's "Behind the Scenes" set.)
- Mickey Meets the Maestro: A behind-the-scenes featurette on the meeting of Mickey and conductor James Levine in Fantasia 2000.
- Color Titles from Mickey Mouse Club: The original opening sequence of The Mickey Mouse Club is shown in color. There are five different 25-second openings, one for each day of the week, each with a different theme.
- The Making of Mickey's Christmas Carol: A behind-the-scenes featurette from the 1980s that examines the filmmakers' approach to the material as they cast Disney characters as Dickens characters, and match animators to characters. Producer/director Burny Mattinson, animators Glen Keane and David Block, and some of the voice actors are interviewed.
- Publicity and Memorabilia Gallery: This gallery shows posters and advertisements for the Mickey shorts on this set.
- Story and Background Gallery: Sketches from some of Mickey's shorts, with notes on costumes, supporting characters, and Mickey's evolution through the years.

== The Chronological Donald, Volume One ==

This set covers the first leg of Donald Duck's long career, from 1934 to 1941. This was one of the few "Treasures" sets to have an international release (on April 4, 2005). 165,000 sets were produced.

=== Disc one ===
==== 1934 ====
- The Wise Little Hen

==== 1936 ====
- Donald and Pluto

==== 1937 ====
- Don Donald
- Modern Inventions
- Donald's Ostrich

==== 1938 ====
- Self Control
- Donald's Better Self
- Donald's Nephews
- Polar Trappers (with Goofy)
- Good Scouts
- The Fox Hunt (with Goofy; Mickey Mouse, Minnie Mouse, Horace Hoarsecollar and Clara Cluck make brief cameos)
- Donald's Golf Game

==== 1939 ====
- Donald's Lucky Day
- The Hockey Champ
- Donald's Cousin Gus
- Beach Picnic
- Sea Scouts
- Donald's Penguin
- The Autograph Hound
- Officer Duck

==== Bonus features ====
- Publicity and Memorabilia Gallery: This gallery features several images of Donald Duck on print, including posters, advertisements, comics and magazine covers.
- The Story and Background Gallery: This background displays animation sketches (mostly storyboards) and background paintings from several Donald cartoons found on this set.
- Clip from The Reluctant Dragon: Easter egg bonus of a clip from The Reluctant Dragon. Robert Benchley finds Clarence Nash and Florence Gill performing the voices of Donald and Clara Cluck.

=== Disc two ===
==== 1940 ====
- The Riveter
- Donald's Dog Laundry
- Billposters (with Goofy)
- Mr. Duck Steps Out
- Put-Put Troubles
- Donald's Vacation
- Window Cleaners
- Fire Chief

==== 1941 ====
- Timber
- Golden Eggs
- A Good Time For a Dime
- Early To Bed
- Truant Officer Donald
- Old MacDonald Duck
- Donald's Camera
- Chef Donald

==== Bonus features ====
- The Man Behind the Duck: A mini-biography about the original voice of Donald, Clarence "Ducky" Nash, who had voiced Donald for 50 years.
- The Volunteer Worker: Easter egg bonus of an additional short dating from 1940. Donald goes from door to door trying to collect money for charity.
- Clip from The Reluctant Dragon: Easter egg bonus of another, color, clip from The Reluctant Dragon. Robert Benchley visits the camera department and gets a lesson on how cartoons come to life, courtesy of Donald himself.

== Walt Disney on the Front Lines ==

This set covers all the World War II cartoons. 250,000 sets were produced.

=== Disc one ===
==== Propaganda and entertainment ====
- Donald Gets Drafted (1942)
- The Army Mascot (1942)
- The Vanishing Private (1942)
- Sky Trooper (1942)
- Private Pluto (1943)
- Fall Out - Fall In (1943)
- Victory Vehicles (1943)
- The Old Army Game (1943)
- Home Defense (1943)
- How to Be a Sailor (1944)
- Commando Duck (1944)

==== Educational shorts ====
- The Thrifty Pig (1941)
- 7 Wise Dwarfs (1941)
- Food Will Win the War (1942)
- Out of the Frying Pan Into the Firing Line (1942)
- Donald's Decision (1942)
- All Together (1942)
- The New Spirit (1942)
- The Spirit of '43 (1943)
- The Winged Scourge (1943)*
- Defense Against Invasion (1943)*
- The Grain That Built a Hemisphere (1943)*
- Cleanliness Brings Health (1945)*
- What Is Disease? (AKA The Unseen Enemy) (1945)*
- Planning For Good Eating (1946)*

(*) = non-theatrical

==== From the vault ====
- Der Fuehrer's Face (1943)
- Education for Death: The Making of the Nazi (1943)
- Reason and Emotion (1943)
- Chicken Little (1943)

=== Disc two ===
==== Feature film ====
- Victory Through Air Power (1943): This World War II film, meant to send a message rather than entertain, is adapted from a book by Russian-born Major Alexander P. de Seversky. It starts out with a brief but interesting history of airplanes, starting with the Wright Brothers' first flight in Kitty Hawk. We see aviation being explored by various nations for various purposes and then airplanes put to limited use in World War I, followed by a series of successes in flight, before finally moving on to World War II. The film talks about the history of Major de Seversky, who later explains about how the advent of aircraft spells change in the face of traditional warfare. It then goes on to explain how the Allies chose not to embrace the use of air power and instead, used old-fashioned methods of warfare to battle the Axis powers, who used aircraft to do their dirty work. The point the film makes is that the only way for the Allies to secure victory over the robust Axis is to make heavy use of military aviation, because, as we're told, fighting on the surface puts the advantage in the hands of Adolf Hitler.

==== Training shorts ====
- Four Methods of Flush Riveting: This film, produced under the direction of the Lockheed Aircraft Corporation, a neighbor of the Disney studios, uses cheap, quick animation diagrams to provide the lowdown on flush riveting.
- Stop That Tank!: This film, made for Canada, begins with an interesting cartoon showing Hitler (depicted as a ranting madman speaking in phoney German) and an armada of tanks trying to invade a peaceful-looking village, only to be fought off by a barrage of gunfire from anti-tank guns, so much so that it sends Hitler to Hell. The rest of this short is a dry and technical explanation and description of the Boys Anti-Tank Rifle. Just like the previous short, animation is limited.
- Training Film Montage: Narrated by Maltin, this segment contains various clips from the many training films Disney made for the military, including one film that was restricted, because it contained formulas to mix a glue that could be used to create weather-sealed patches on wooden airplanes. This film contains a wide spectrum of instructional films and Maltin also describes the different animation methods used for these works.

==== Bonus features ====
- On the Set of Victory Through Air Power: This film contains rare behind-the-scene footage of the 1943 film.
- Victory Through Air Power Trailer: A look at how this film was promoted to audiences.
- Galleries
  - Production Art Gallery: This gallery depicts art from many of the cartoons on the first disc. They are all a blend of black and white sketches, color sketches and background paintings.
  - Victory Through Air Power Gallery: A lot of images, divided into four sections (Visual Development, Story, Backgrounds and Publicity), are depicted.
  - The Gremlins Gallery: A few images on an interesting collaboration between Walt Disney and children's author Roald Dahl. Dahl's first book was to be the first adapted into a feature film, too. But the project was scrapped after Dahl was disappointed by the conceptual artwork and Walt Disney couldn't secure copyrights to the term "Gremlins".
  - Poster Gallery: Various attention-grabbing messages depicted on posters in this gallery.
  - Dispatches From Disney's: A disregarded publication.
  - Joe Grant's Sketchbook: Artwork from the Disney character designer and animator.
  - Insignia Gallery: Various Disney insignias and logos used for the war effort.
- A Conversation With John Hench: Maltin meets with the longest-term Disney employee, who discusses how after the attack on Pearl Harbor, the Burbank studio was instantly turned into a base for the military.
- A Conversation With Joe Grant: Maltin meets with the longtime Disney animator and storyman, who compares the modern American terror situation to World War II. Grant discusses the changes he saw at the Disney studio once uniformed men showed up. He also lends some insight to the shorts Der Fuehrer's Face, The New Spirit, Education For Death, Reason and Emotion and Victory Through Air Power. He also touches upon the subject of working with Dick Huemer.
- A Conversation With Roy Disney: Walt's nephew recalls his boyhood memories of the Disney studio during the war and also touches on the Disney insignia's popularity and his own method of promoting Victory Through Air Power.

== Tomorrow Land ==

This set collects the various episodes of the Walt Disney anthology series that were set in Tomorrowland, many of them directed by legendary Disney animator Ward Kimball. 105,000 sets were produced.

=== Disc one ===
- Man In Space (1955): This Disneyland episode, narrated partly by Kimball, talks briefly about the lighthearted history of rockets and is followed by discussions of satellites, a practical look (through humorous animation) at what spacemen will have to face in a rocket (both physically and psychologically, such as momentum, weightlessness, radiation, even space sickness) and a rocket takeoff into space.
- Man and the Moon (1955): This Disneyland episode portrays everything about the Moon. It begins with a humorous look with Man's fascination with the Moon through animation. This segment features the Moon's usage in everything from William Shakespeare and children's nursery rhymes to lunar superstitions and scientific research. Then Kimball comes on with some information on the moon, supplemented by graphics. Kimball then introduces Dr. Wernher Von Braun, who discusses plans for a trip around the moon. Finally, a live action simulation from inside and outside a rocket dramatizes what such an expedition might be like.
- Mars and Beyond (1957): This Disneyland episode talks all about the possibility of life on other planets, especially Mars. It also tells of how a trip to Mars will be accomplished and how a trip of that type would entail to spacemen. Narration is courtesy of the great Paul Frees, who does most of the voices in this episode as well.

=== Disc two ===
- Eyes In Outer Space (1959): short film, the narrator is Paul Frees. The focus here is the weather. It discusses weather superstitions, water, how it changes form, satellites and weather predictions.
- Our Friend the Atom (1957): This Disneyland episode talks about the history of the atom, hosted by Dr. Heinz Haber, who compares the discovery of the atom to an Arabian Nights fable of The Fisherman and the Genie. He uses well-known theories, formulas and experiments to discuss the atom, such as E = mc² and a light beam passing through a gold sheet. He illustrates chain reactions in nuclear fission using a table filled with mousetraps represents the atoms and pingpong balls stand in for the new neutrons created from the split.
- EPCOT: This is a promotional film from 1967, directed not at the public but at the state and local legislature in Florida, as a means of clarifying the scope of their intent and ambition for their recently initiated "Florida Project". The centerpiece of the film is Walt's enthusiastic presentation of the plans for EPCOT, not the Tomorrowland-type theme park of today, but rather "an experimental prototype community that will always be in a state of becoming," in the words of Walt. The film details the elaborate radial plan for the city, as well as transportation plans for EPCOT, which called for three levels of transportation, with a high-speed monorail and a WEDWAY People Mover at the highest level. Walt's presentation was filmed just two months prior to his death in December 1966, and the film was completed after his death.
- Bonus Features
  - The Optimistic Futurist: Maltin meets with author Ray Bradbury on Walt and his creations. Bradbury discusses Disney's optimism, his vision, and his achievements in television and parks.
  - Marty Sklar, Walt and EPCOT: Maltin interviews Marty Sklar, a longtime Disney employee and Vice President of Walt Disney Imagineering. Sklar discusses Walt as a visionary, plus "Tomorrowland" the program and the section at Disneyland, especially the latter, since Sklar seems to practically be an authority on Disney parks.
  - Publicity and Publication Gallery: This gallery contains ad materials for "Man In Space"'s theatrical release as a featurette (it accompanied Davy Crockett and the River Pirates), plus Disney's high-class companion books to the series.
  - Behind the Scenes Gallery: This gallery shows off pictures of the creative talent behind the Tomorrowland programs.
  - Story and Background Art Gallery: This gallery contains stills, TV storyboards and conceptual art from Man In Space, Man and the Moon and Mars and Beyond.
  - The Sherman Brothers Performing "There's a Great Big Beautiful Tomorrow": Easter egg bonus begins by showing Richard and Robert Sherman performing the song with Walt himself. Walt then addresses the recipients of the song, the General Electric Pavilion at the 1964 New York World's Fair. To access, go to the Bonus Features menu and select the red horseshoe-shaped object near the bottom of the screen.
