= The Vanishing Private =

1942 Donald Duck cartoon

- Theatrical release poster
- Directed by: Jack King
- Story by: Carl Barks
- Produced by: Walt Disney
- Starring: Clarence Nash; Billy Bletcher; Don Brodie
- Music by: Oliver Wallace
- Animation by: Paul Allen; Ed Love
- Production company: Walt Disney Productions
- Distributed by: RKO Radio Pictures
- Release date: September 25, 1942
- Running time: 7 minutes
- Country: United States
- Language: English

The Vanishing Private is a 1942 animated cartoon directed by Jack King and produced by Walt Disney. In the cartoon, Donald Duck is ordered to paint a cannon with experimental invisible paint while serving as a private in the United States Army during World War II.

== Plot ==
Donald Duck is doing some camouflage painting on a cannon with yellow, green, and red stripes and black dots. Sergeant Pete sees it and scolds Donald, explaining that it needs to be painted so it can't be seen. Pete then demands that Donald re-paints the cannon to "make that gun hard to see". Obliging to the sergeant's orders, Donald walks to the "Experimental Laboratory: Camouflage Corps", disregarding the "keep out" sign, and walks in. He finds some "invisible paint", which he tests with his finger, and uses it to paint the cannon.

When Pete returns, he is shocked to find the cannon seemingly gone, believing it to be stolen. But of course, it isn't stolen, as the sergeant finds out the hard way by bonking his head on the underside of the cannon and discovering Donald inside. Angered that Donald painted the cannon too invisible to see and reacting to something Donald did inside, Pete blows hard into one end of the barrel, sending Donald out the other end and into the bucket of invisible paint. When Donald runs away, Pete finds out Donald has become invisible after seeing Donald's footprints on the ground. Donald then swims across a lake, but the invisible paint doesn't come off.

Pete continues to chase Donald through a field of flowers, until he accidentally throws some of the flowers on Donald, revealing his outline. Pete spots Donald and tries to catch him, but he gets away again. This gives Pete an idea to find Donald. When the General drives up, Pete's antics, including jumping around a tree while singing "Here We Go Round The Mulberry Bush" and throwing flowers, convinces the General that he is acting odd, especially after he asks the General, "Uh, did you see a little guy that you can't see?". The invisible Donald then deliberately puts a cactus down Pete's pants, making him scream in pain and jump around like a madman, making the General wonder what is going on with Pete.

Donald then walks around a nearby kitchen and sees some pies in the window, so he takes one of the pies and eats it. Pete then notices this and Donald deliberately throws the pie in Pete's face. Donald is then shown skipping a rope, which angers Pete, so he chases him around a tank. Donald then deliberately trips Pete, sending him literally under the grass, under some soldiers, and out again into the arsenal building, where he gets hold of several grenades, shouting "I'll blow ya apart!", and begins blowing things up to stop Donald, on the warpath against him, starting with a tree that literally flies into the air and floats down. The General sees this, growing worried for Pete's sanity, and when Pete runs towards him, he gets scared out of his wits, and hides behind a nearby power pole. The General tries to reassure Pete and stop his rampage, but Donald stands behind the General, who panickedly tries to tell Pete to calm himself, and when Donald deliberately pokes Pete in the rear with the General's sword, the startled sergeant jumps into the air and onto the General, releasing all of the grenades, which land on Pete and the General, injuring them in the explosion.

Later, Pete is locked up in a padded cell, wearing a straitjacket and chains, as he has been declared insane by the army for his bad actions. He pleads to Donald (who is on guard duty and no longer invisible anymore) to go tell the General of his sanity ("I ain't crazy! You know I ain't crazy! Go tell the general that I ain't crazy!"), but Donald refuses, asking Pete "Do you think I'M crazy?" and whistles "The Army's Not the Army Anymore" as the cartoon irises-out.

== Voice cast ==
- Donald Duck: Clarence Nash
- Pete: Billy Bletcher
- The General: Don Brodie

== Home media ==
The short was released on May 18, 2004, on Walt Disney Treasures: Walt Disney on the Front Lines and on December 6, 2005, on Walt Disney Treasures: The Chronological Donald, Volume Two: 1942-1946.

== See also ==
- List of World War II short films
