= Donald's Dog Laundry =

1940 Donald Duck cartoon

- Directed by: Jack King
- Produced by: Walt Disney
- Starring: Clarence Nash; Lee Millar
- Music by: Leigh Harline; Larry Sharpsteen
- Color process: Technicolor
- Production company: Walt Disney Productions
- Distributed by: RKO Radio Pictures
- Release date: April 5, 1940
- Country: United States
- Language: English

Donald's Dog Laundry is a 1940 American Donald Duck short film directed by Jack King and produced by Walt Disney.

== Plot ==
Donald Duck constructs an automated dog washer. He attempts to use Pluto as his test subject, but Pluto refuses and hides in his dog house. Donald uses a rubber bone as bait, but it comes off the rope after a tug of war. When Donald uses a cat hand puppet as a dog bait, some soap is splashed on Pluto, making him look like a poodle. At this, Donald takes the opportunity and proceeds to get Pluto into the dog washer, but by then, the soap went into Pluto's nose, making him sneeze. It resulted in Donald flying into the dog washer and Pluto hitting the electric pole with the controls for the dog washer, thus activating it. As machine turns on, two robotic arms wearing boxing gloves grab Donald by the collar from the back and two arms scrub his head and mouth. Then it dumps his head and upper body in the water allowing it to scrub his rear end. Then a shower sprays Donald with water, rinsing the soap out. Then the arms grab Donald and place him on the drying table which dries his belly. Then the arms flip him over and grab his legs. Then an arm carrying a bottle of "Flea Powder" sprinkles it on his rear and hangs his rear with a pin on the washing line. Amused, Donald comments "Well, I'll be doggone! Absolutely perfect!" and laughs as the cartoon irises out.

== Voice cast ==
- Clarence Nash as Donald Duck
- Lee Millar as Pluto

== Home media ==
The short was released on May 18, 2004, on Walt Disney Treasures: The Chronological Donald, Volume One: 1934-1941.

It can also be found on VHS on Everybody Loves Donald and on DVD on Walt Disney's Classic Cartoon Favorites: Starring Donald.
