= Old Sequoia =

1945 Donald Duck cartoon

- Theatrical release poster
- Directed by: Jack King
- Story by: Homer Brightman
- Produced by: Walt Disney
- Starring: Clarence Nash; Billy Bletcher
- Music by: Oliver Wallace
- Animation by: Paul Allen; Bill Justice; Joshua Meador; Don Towsley
- Layouts by: Ernie Nordli
- Backgrounds by: Merle Cox
- Color process: Technicolor
- Production company: Walt Disney Productions
- Distributed by: RKO Radio Pictures
- Release date: December 21, 1945; (USA)
- Running time: 6:30
- Country: United States
- Language: English

Old Sequoia is an American animated short film directed by Jack King featuring Donald Duck. The cartoon was produced in Technicolor by Walt Disney Productions and released to theaters on December 21, 1945, by RKO Radio Pictures.

== Plot ==
An ancient sequoia tree labeled "Old Sequoia" sits surrounded by a small fence in a National Park. Donald Duck, a struggling ranger at the park, is tasked with protecting the massive tree by the park's chief ranger (possibly Pete), who further warns Donald that he will lose his job if Old Sequoia falls.

Donald spots a pair of beavers dangerously close to Old Sequoia and unsuccessfully attempts to fend them off with a shotgun. The beavers eventually reach Old Sequoia and, after Donald is briefly distracted by another phone call from the chief ranger, infiltrate the tree through its roots and begin gnawing on it from the inside, causing sawdust to pour out.

Donald frantically tries to undo the beavers' damage by stuffing the sawdust back inside of Old Sequoia, but when he attempts to speed his efforts up with a vacuum pipe, he inadvertently overstuffs it and causes the hollowed-out trunk to explode, exposing the beavers and leaving the tree supported by a narrow spindle. As Donald scrambles to support the unstable tree, the beavers sabotage his efforts by creating a shockwave that rattles the tree to the point that he can no longer save it.

With Old Sequoia on the verge of falling, Donald desperately attempts to prop the tree up with several wooden poles and bark from the tree's base, but the phone in the outpost rings once more, forcing him to abandon his repairs. On the other end, the chief ranger asks for an update on Old Sequoia. As Donald nervously lies to the chief about the tree being fine, the massive tree finally falls, dragging the lookout post and Donald off a nearby cliff into the lake below. In the submerged ruins of the post, the chief ranger, now aware of Old Sequoia's demise, furiously dismisses Donald over the phone for failing to protect it, much to Donald's irritation.

== Voice cast ==
- Clarence Nash as Donald Duck
- Billy Bletcher as Donald's boss

== Home media ==
The short was released on December 6, 2005, on Walt Disney Treasures: The Chronological Donald, Volume Two: 1942-1946.

Additional releases include:

- Walt Disney's Classic Cartoon Favorites Extreme Adventure Fun Volume 7

== Other titles ==
- Denmark: Skovens beskytter
- Sweden: Kalle Anka som skogvaktare
