= Trombone Trouble =

1944 Donald Duck cartoon

- Theatrical release poster
- Directed by: Jack King
- Story by: Jack Hannah; Carl Barks
- Produced by: Walt Disney
- Starring: Clarence Nash; Billy Bletcher; John McLeish
- Music by: Paul J. Smith
- Animation by: Paul Allen; Judge Whitaker; Charles Nichols; Hal King; Les Clark; Marvin Woodward; Andy Engman; Jerry Hatchcock
- Color process: Technicolor
- Production company: Walt Disney Productions
- Distributed by: RKO Radio Pictures
- Release date: February 18, 1944; (USA)
- Running time: 7 minutes
- Country: United States
- Language: English

Trombone Trouble is a Walt Disney cartoon that was released on February 18, 1944. It is the only Donald Duck cartoon where Roman/Greek gods play a role.

This short marks Pete's last appearance until 1952's Two Gun Goofy.

== Plot ==
Pete is cacophonically playing his trombone through the night. The gods Jupiter and Vulcan (who look like ducks similar to Donald) are woken by Pete's noise and decide to think of some way to stop this. Donald has a similar issue. He can't sleep with Pete's noise. He goes to Pete's house, and Pete responds by blowing through the trombone as hard as he can right in Donald's face, sending Donald back into his house into a wall. Jupiter and Vulcan notice Donald wanting to stop the noise, so Jupiter decides to give him some of his power so he can get rid of Pete. Donald fires lightning bolts from his hands, makes his hands electric, and develops godlike strength and succeeds in getting rid of Pete. Jupiter and Vulcan think that their troubles are now over, and go back to sleep on their cloud. Donald notices Pete's trombone and has the desire to play it. Jupiter and Vulcan awake to see that the one whom they helped get rid of Pete is now playing the trombone himself and they collapse from the cloud with exasperation.

== Voice cast ==
- Donald: Clarence Nash
- Pete: Billy Bletcher
- Jupiter and Vulcan: John McLeish

== Home media ==
The short was released on December 6, 2005, on Walt Disney Treasures: The Chronological Donald, Volume Two: 1942-1946.
