= Jack King (animator) =

American animator (1895–1958)

- Born: James Patton King; November 4, 1895; Birmingham, Alabama, U.S.
- Died: October 4, 1958 (aged 62); Los Angeles, California, U.S.
- Resting place: Forest Lawn Memorial Park, Glendale, California, U.S.
- Occupations: Animator; Short film director; artist
- Years active: 1920–1948
- Employer(s): Bray Productions (1920); International Film Service (1920-1921); Winkler Productions (1921-1926); Walt Disney Productions (1929-1933; 1936-48); Leon Schlesinger Productions (1933-1936)

James Patton "Jack" King (November 4, 1895 – October 4, 1958) was an American animator and short film director best known for his work at Walt Disney Productions.

== Career ==
According to Jeff Lenburg's assessment of him, King was an early pioneer of animation. His films were nominated three times for the Academy Award for Best Animated Short Film. He started his career in the silent film era. He spent most of his career working at Walt Disney Productions (later known as the Walt Disney Animation Studios). He directed many well-regarded films.

King was born in 1895 in Birmingham, Alabama. He started his animation career in 1920, working at Bray Productions animation studio. He directed the Judge Rummy series (1920-1921) for the International Film Service. The silent animated series was based on the comic strip Judge Rummy by Tad Dorgan. His early films also included Kiss Me (1920), Why Change Your Husband (1920), and The Chicken Thief (1921). The series reportedly ended in 1921.

King moved to Winkler Pictures, where he worked on Bill Nolan's Krazy Kat series, leaving with Nolan after Nolan was fired in favor of Ben Harrison and Manny Gould. He relocated to the West Coast of the United States, where he joined the Disney studio on June 17, 1929, as an animator. He helped direct the Mickey Mouse short The Haunted House on an uncredited basis. His animation film credits include several Silly Symphony animated shorts, which Lenburg describes as "cartoon fables". Among King's Disney film credits was the short film The Three Little Pigs (1933), which won the Academy Award for Best Animated Short Film. King remained with Disney until May 17, 1933.

In 1933, animation producer Leon Schlesinger was setting up a new animation studio, Leon Schlesinger Productions, which would continue producing the Looney Tunes and Merrie Melodies series for Warner Bros. Pictures. The studio was set on the Warner lot on Sunset Boulevard in Los Angeles, California. Schlesinger was in need of a new staff for his studio and started hiring people who used to work for other animation studios. Among them was King, who "was probably the first Disney animator Schlesinger hired".

By June 1933, Schlesinger had rounded out his staff and started work on producing animated short films. Tom Palmer had been appointed production manager and director, with King as the head animator. Among the staff were two of King's former associates from Disney, animators Paul Fennell and Bill Mason. According to animation historian Michael Barrier, Schlesinger placed former Disney animators in charge of the studio in hopes of effectively competing with the Disney studio.

Palmer was fired after working on two unsatisfactory short films. He was replaced as director by Earl Duvall, a former story man for both Disney and Harman and Ising. Duvall himself was also fired after completing five short films. Schlesinger was in need of new directors, and even composer Bernard B. Brown received credits for directing two Merrie Melodies shorts. By early 1934, Schlesinger appointed Friz Freleng as the main director of the Merrie Melodies series and King as the main director of the Looney Tunes series. King handled many of the studio's animated short films starring Buddy, and was responsible for the final year of Buddy films.

By 1935, Buddy was being phased out in favor of new characters; among them was Beans, an anthropomorphic cat. King directed A Cartoonist's Nightmare, Beans' first starring role. King directed a total of eight animated shorts featuring Beans. Michael Barrier describes Beans under King's direction as resembling Mickey Mouse's incarnation of the early 1930s. Their designs were certainly similar, with both characters having a white face and black body, but in characterization Beans was a pint-sized hero resembling the plucky, boyish, and heroic Mickey featured in The Klondike Kid (1932) and The Mail Pilot (1933).

Also in 1935, the studio gained a third full-time director working in addition to Freleng and King: Tex Avery, a former animator for Universal Pictures. Avery directed a single film starring Beans, Gold Diggers of '49 (1935); he would use Porky Pig as the main star of his following films. Meanwhile, King continued using Beans as the main star of his own films. In 1936, Beans and most of the characters introduced the previous year, with the exception of Porky Pig, ceased being used by the studio. Barrier suggests that Leon Schlesinger may have been giving Avery a vote of confidence, when deciding to keep only Porky as a continuing character and to drop Beans. This decision came at the expense of King and his work.

King directed two films featuring characters Ham and Ex: The Phantom Ship (1936) and The Fire Alarm (1936). The characters were a pair of troublesome puppies and were intended to serve as series stars. In 1936, King started directing new cartoons starring Porky. Other films in the series were directed by Tex Avery and Frank Tashlin. King directed only three animated shorts starring Porky Pig.

By April 1936, King left for Disney to be hired as a director, in order to work on color cartoons that Schlesinger had refused to allow him. Part of the reason he returned to Disney was the promise that he would be able to direct cartoons in color, which he had been unable to do previously. Friz Freleng and Tex Avery were the only directors that Schlesinger allowed to direct color films for much of the 1930s.

At Disney, King emerged as the director of a new series of short films, featuring Donald Duck as the protagonist. Lenburg notes that King was one of the principal directors of the Donald Duck series, but not the only one (other directors of this series included Ben Sharpsteen, Dick Lundy, Jack Hannah, and Jack Kinney). King made his directorial debut at Disney with the film Modern Inventions (1937). It was also his first time directing a Donald Duck animated film.

King directed more than forty films featuring Donald Duck, among them were the Academy Award-nominated Good Scouts (1938), Truant Officer Donald (1941), and Donald's Crime (1945). One of his films was a propaganda film, The Spirit of '43 (1943), created in association with the United States Department of the Treasury. King's last film was The Trial of Donald Duck (1948). King retired from Disney in 1948 and spent ten years in retirement. He died on October 4, 1958, in Los Angeles.

== Filmography ==
- Why Change Your Husband (director) (1920)
- Kiss Me (director) (1920)
- Too Much Pep (director) (1921)
- The New Champ (animator) (1925)
- Scents and Nonsense (animator) (1926)

=== First Disney period (1929–1933) ===
- The Plowboy (animator - uncredited) (1929)
- The Haunted House (director - uncredited) (1929)
- Cannibal Capers (Short) (animator - uncredited) (1930)
- Frolicking Fish (animator - uncredited) (1930)
- The Fire Fighters (animator) (1930)
- Monkey Melodies (animator - uncredited) (1930)
- The Chain Gang (animator - uncredited) (1930)
- Night (animator - uncredited) (1930)
- Midnight in a Toy Shop (animator - uncredited) (1930)
- The Gorilla Mystery (animator) (1930)
- Winter (animator - uncredited) (1930)
- The Picnic (animator - uncredited) (1930)
- Pioneer Days (animator) (1930)
- Playful Pan (animator - uncredited) (1930)
- The Birthday Party (animator) (1931)
- Birds of a Feather (animator) (1931)
- Traffic Troubles (animator - uncredited) (1931)
- Mother Goose Melodies (animator) (1931)
- The China Plate (animator) (1931)
- Blue Rhythm (animator - uncredited) (1931)
- The Beach Party (animator) (1931)
- Mickey Cuts Up (animator) (1931)
- Mickey's Orphans (animator) (1931)
- The Duck Hunt (animator) (1932)
- Mickey in Arabia (animator) (animator - uncredited)
- Just Dogs (animator) (1932)
- Flowers and Trees (animator) (1932)
- Mickey's Nightmare (animator - uncredited) (1932)
- Trader Mickey (animator) (1932)
- The Whoopee Party (animator) (1932)
- Bugs in Love (animator - uncredited) (1932)
- Babes in the Woods (animator) (1932)
- Santa's Workshop (animator) (1932)
- Birds in the Spring (animator - uncredited) (1933)
- The Mad Doctor (animator - uncredited) (1933)
- Three Little Pigs (animator) (1933)
- Mickey's Gala Premier (animator - uncredited) (1933)

=== Looney Tunes and Merrie Melodies period (1933–1936) ===
- Sittin' on a Backyard Fence (animator) (1933)
- Buddy's Show Boat (animator) (1933)
- Buddy's Beer Garden (animator) (1933)
- I've Got to Sing a Torch Song (animator) (1933)
- Buddy's Day Out (animator - uncredited) (1933)
- Beauty and the Beast (animator) (1934)
- Pettin' in the Park (animator) (1934)
- Buddy the Gob (animator) (1934)
- Honeymoon Hotel (animator) (1934)
- Viva Buddy (director) (1934)
- Buddy's Circus (director) (1934)
- Buddy the Woodsman (director) (1934)
- Buddy the Detective (director) (1934)
- Buddy and Towser (animator) (1934)
- Buddy's Garage (animator) (1934)
- Buddy's Bearcats (director) (1934)
- Buddy the Dentist (animator) (1934)
- I Haven't Got a Hat (animator) (1935)
- Hollywood Capers (director) (1935)
- A Cartoonist's Nightmare (director) (1935)
- Buddy the Gee Man (director) (1935)
- Buddy Steps Out (director) (1935)
- Buddy's Bug Hunt (director) (1935)
- Buddy's Lost World (director) (1935)
- The Phantom Ship (director) (1936)
- Boom Boom (director) (1936)
- The Fire Alarm (director) (1936)
- Alpine Antics (director) (1936)
- Westward Whoa (director) (1936)
- Fish Tales (director) (1936)
- Shanghaied Shipmates (director) (1936)
- Porky's Pet (director) (1936)
- Porky's Moving Day (director) (1936)

=== Second Disney period (1937–1949) ===
In this period, almost all the films in which King worked belong to the Donald Duck's series

- Modern Inventions (director) (1937)
- Donald's Ostrich (uncredited) (director) (1937)
- Self Control (uncredited) (director) (1938)
- Donald's Better Self (uncredited) (director) (1938)
- Donald's Golf Game (uncredited) (director) (1938)
- Good Scouts (director) (1938)
- Donald's Nephews (uncredited) (director and animator) (1938)
- The Autograph Hound (uncredited) (director) (1939)
- Donald's Penguin (uncredited) (director) (1939)
- Donald's Cousin Gus (uncredited) (director) (1939)
- The Hockey Champ (uncredited) (director) (1939)
- Donald's Lucky Day (uncredited) (director) (1939)
- Fire Chief (director) (1940)
- Window Cleaners (uncredited) (director) (1940)
- Tugboat Mickey (animator) (1940)
- Donald's Vacation (director) (1940)
- Mr. Duck Steps Out (uncredited) (director) (1940)
- Donald's Dog Laundry (uncredited) (director) (1940)
- Chef Donald (uncredited) (director) (1941)
- Old MacDonald Duck (director) (1941)
- Truant Officer Donald (director) (1941)
- Early to Bed (director) (1941)
- Timber (uncredited) (director) (1941)
- Bellboy Donald (director) (1942)
- Sky Trooper (director and animator) (1942)
- The Vanishing Private (director) (1942)
- Out of the Frying Pan Into the Firing Line (short) (uncredited) (director) (1942)
- Donald Gets Drafted (uncredited) (director) (1942)
- Donald's Snow Fight (uncredited) (director) (1942)
- Home Defense (director) (1943)
- The Old Army Game (director) (1943)
- Fall Out Fall In (director) (1943)
- The Spirit of '43 (short documentary) (uncredited) (director) (1943)
- The Plastics Inventor (director) (1944)
- Commando Duck (uncredited) (director) (1944)
- Contrary Condor (director) (1944)
- Donald Duck and the Gorilla (uncredited) (director and animator) (1944)
- Trombone Trouble (uncredited) (director) (1944)
- Old Sequoia (director) (1945)
- Cured Duck (director) (1945)
- Donald's Crime (director) (1945)
- The Clock Watcher (director) (1945)
- Defense Against Invasion (uncredited) (director) (1946)
- Dumb Bell of the Yukon (director) (1946)
- Wet Paint (director) (1946)
- Donald's Double Trouble (director) (1946)
- Wide Open Spaces (director) (1947)
- Donald's Dilemma (director) (1947)
- Sleepy Time Donald (director) (1947)
- The Trial of Donald Duck (direction) (1948)
- Donald's Dream Voice (director) (1948)
- Drip Dippy Donald (director) (director) (1948)
- The Adventures of Ichabod and Mr. Toad (Animator: Segment The Wind in the Willows) (1949)
- Disneyland
  - Donald's Award (director) (1957)
  - Donald's Weekend (1958) (sequence director)
  - Donald Duck and his Companions (segment "Donald's Vacation") (director) (1960)
  - Inside Donald Duck (1961) (segment director)

=== After his death ===
- Mickey Mouse Disco (Short) (1980)
- DTV: Golden Oldies (Video) (original material) (1984)
- DTV: Pop & Rock (Video) (original material) (1984)
- DTV: Rock, Rhythm & Blues (Video) (original material) (1984)
- An Officer and a Duck (Video) (segment "Donald Gets Drafted") (1985)
- DTV Valentine (TV Movie) (original material) (1986)
- Lifestyles of the Rich and Animated (TV Movie) (segment "Drip Dippy Donald", uncredited) (1991)
- Mickey's House of Villains (Video) (segment "Donald Duck and the Gorilla") (2001)
- ToonHeads (TV Series documentary) (2 episodes) (2003)
  - The Early Career of Porky Pig (original material)
  - The Worst Cartoons Ever Made (original material)
- Behind the Tunes: Crash! Bang! Boom! - The Wild Sounds of Treg Brown (Video documentary short) (original material) (2004)
- Behind the Tunes: Bosko, Buddy and the Best of Black and White (Video documentary short) (original material) (2005)
- Cartoon Alley (TV Series documentary) (1 episode) (2005)
  - The Early Days of Warner Brothers Cartoons (original material) (2005)

== Sources ==
- Barrier, Michael (2003), "Warner Bros., 1933-1940", Hollywood Cartoons: American Animation in Its Golden Age, Oxford University Press, ISBN 978-0199839223
- Lenburg, Jeff (2006), "King, Jack", Who's who in Animated Cartoons: An International Guide to Film and Television's Award-Winning and Legendary Animators, Hal Leonard Corporation, ISBN 978-1557836717
