= Home Defense =

1943 Donald Duck cartoon

- Title card
- Directed by: Jack King
- Story by: Carl Barks; Jack Hannah
- Produced by: Walt Disney
- Starring: Clarence Nash
- Music by: Paul Smith
- Animation by: Paul Allen; Bill Justice; Hal King; Dick Lundy; Charles Nichols; Harvey Toombs
- Color process: Technicolor
- Production company: Walt Disney Productions
- Distributed by: RKO Radio Pictures
- Release date: December 28, 1943
- Running time: 8 minutes
- Country: United States
- Language: English

Home Defense is a 1943 animated short film produced by Walt Disney Productions and distributed by RKO Radio Pictures. The film shows Donald Duck and his three nephews Huey, Dewey, and Louie serving as civilian aircraft spotters during World War II. The film was directed by Jack King, Clarence Nash voices the characters.

== Plot ==
The story takes place during World War II in which Donald Duck and his three nephews, Huey, Dewey, and Louie, are serving as civilian aircraft spotters on the West Coast of the United States. In order to detect the sound of approaching enemy aircraft, Donald uses a listening apparatus consisting of headphones and a large horn amplifier pointed skyward.

One morning at the listening post, Donald accidentally wakes up Huey, Dewey, and Louie who were sleeping nearby. The boys, serving as Donald's gun crew, retaliate by faking an airborne invasion as a prank. They fill a motorized toy plane with gingerbread paratroopers and fly it around the amplifier. Donald awakes, sees the plane, and shoots it down with his home-made anti-aircraft battery. As the plane is falling to earth, the gingerbread men deploy. When Donald sees the parachutes, he panics and hides in the grass while Huey, Dewey, and Louie create artificial combat noises. When Donald finally discovers the ruse, he angrily calls his nephews to attention and relieves them of duty. The nephews tearfully leave as Donald continues to listen for aircraft alone.

Later, Donald hears the sound of a bee buzzing near the amplifier and believes that his nephews are playing a trick on him again. However, when he sees the boys are not up to anything, Donald returns to the listening post and continues to hear the bee, imagining the sound is approaching Japanese forces. Donald quickly reinstates the boys and has them man a large cannon. Donald carefully calculates the position of the sound and relays orders to Huey, Dewey, and Louie in aiming the cannon. After following Donald's instructions, the nephews aim the cannon directly at the acoustic horn where the bee is. Despite their objections, Donald orders them to fire the weapon, which sends the amplified blast into Donald's ears. The nephews laugh while Donald goes into his characteristic temper tantrum while suspended off the ground by his earphones.

== Voice cast ==
- Donald Duck: Clarence Nash
- Huey, Dewey, and Louie: Clarence Nash

== Releases ==
- 1943 - theatrical release
- 1957 - The Mickey Mouse Club (TV)
- 1997 - Ink & Paint Club: "The Unseen Disney" (TV)
- 1998 - Ink & Paint Club: "Triple Trouple" (TV)

== Home media ==
The short was released on May 18, 2004 on Walt Disney Treasures: Walt Disney on the Front Lines and on December 6, 2005 on Walt Disney Treasures: The Chronological Donald, Volume Two: 1942-1946.

Additional releases include:

- 1985 - An Officer and a Duck (VHS and Laserdisc)
