= The Old Army Game =

1943 Donald Duck cartoon

- Theatrical release poster
- Directed by: Jack King
- Story by: Carl Barks; Jack Hannah
- Produced by: Walt Disney
- Starring: Clarence Nash
- Music by: Paul Smith
- Color process: Technicolor
- Production company: Walt Disney Productions
- Distributed by: RKO Radio Pictures
- Release date: November 5, 1943
- Running time: 7 minutes
- Country: United States
- Language: English

The Old Army Game is a 1943 World War II cartoon starring Donald Duck that was produced by Walt Disney and distributed by RKO Radio Pictures.

== Plot ==
Sergeant Pete inspects a camp at night, taking note of the varied snores coming from the sleeping soldiers' barracks. When he hears a snatch of snoring repeat itself, he enters one building and finds a phonograph playing the sound effects from a record that has begun to skip. Donald's bunk and several others are occupied by dummies, making Pete realize that the men and duck have gone AWOL.

Donald hitches a ride back to camp and sneaks past the guards and into his barracks, settling down in his bunk without seeing that Pete is already there. Once Donald takes notice, he runs out and hides under one of three boxes, mixing them up to fool Pete. Pete checks the boxes repeatedly but fails to find Donald, then kicks the box in which he is hiding across the compound. It slides across the top of a bladed fence and splits in half; Donald, landing in a waist-deep hole, thinks that he too has been cut apart and begins to cry. Pete catches up to him and also starts to cry when he takes in the situation, and Donald takes his pistol and attempts to shoot himself. When Pete urges him to do it behind some nearby bushes, Donald crawls out of the hole and sees that his lower half is still intact. He is relieved, but Pete becomes furious at the deception and begins chasing him down the road. They slow their pace upon finding a sign marked with a speed limit of 35 miles per hour, the music slowing as well, and the chase continues as the cartoon ends.

== Voice cast ==
- Donald Duck: Clarence Nash
- Pete: Billy Bletcher

== Home media ==
The short was released on May 18, 2004, on Walt Disney Treasures: Walt Disney on the Front Lines and on December 6, 2005, on Walt Disney Treasures: The Chronological Donald, Volume Two: 1942-1946.
