= The Village Smithy =

1942 Donald Duck cartoon

- Theatrical release poster
- Directed by: Dick Lundy
- Story by: Carl Barks
- Produced by: Walt Disney
- Starring: Clarence Nash
- Music by: Charles Wolcott
- Color process: Technicolor
- Production company: Walt Disney Productions
- Distributed by: RKO Radio Pictures
- Release date: January 16, 1942; (USA)
- Running time: 7 minutes
- Country: United States
- Language: English

The Village Smithy is a 1942 Donald Duck animated short film, produced in Technicolor by Walt Disney Productions, distributed by RKO Radio Pictures.

== Plot ==
Donald Duck is working to add a new iron rim on a wagon wheel and to put a shoe on Jenny, a donkey. He runs in difficulty with both.

== Voice cast ==
- Clarence Nash as Donald Duck

== Home media ==
The short was released on December 6, 2005 on Walt Disney Treasures: The Chronological Donald, Volume Two: 1942-1946.
