= Bellboy Donald =

1942 Donald Duck cartoon

- Theatrical release poster
- Directed by: Jack King
- Story by: Carl Barks; Jack Hannah; Harry Reeves
- Produced by: Walt Disney
- Starring: Clarence Nash; John McLeish; Glen Couch; John Dehner
- Music by: Oliver Wallace
- Animation by: Bill Tytla; Paul Allen; Ed Love; Jim Armstrong; Lee Morehouse; Hal King; Jack King; Kenneth Muse; Judge Whitaker; Ray Patin; Art Scott
- Layouts by: Bill Herwig
- Color process: Technicolor
- Production company: Walt Disney Productions
- Distributed by: RKO Radio Pictures
- Release date: December 18, 1942; (USA)
- Running time: 7 minutes
- Country: United States
- Language: English

Bellboy Donald is a 1942 animated short film, produced in Technicolor by Walt Disney Productions and distributed by RKO Radio Pictures. This cartoon made the debut of Pete's son Pete Junior. In the cartoon, Donald Duck works as a bellboy at the fictional Lofty Manors Hotel. He is on the verge of being fired because he loses his temper at the guests. His patience is tested when Pete Junior abuses him for the fun of it.

== Plot ==
Donald Duck works as a bellboy at Lofty Manors Hotel. He constantly gets in trouble with his boss because he loses his temper at the guests. One day, his boss warns him that unless he is on his best behavior, he will be fired. In order to have him be on his best behavior, his boss gives him a badge that has the hotel’s motto: "the guest is always right".

Pete and his son Pete Jr. arrive at the hotel. Donald goes out to greet them but they slap and kick him and rip his uniform, causing Donald to almost lose his temper. He takes them to the eightieth floor on an elevator but when Pete walks to their room, Pete Jr. kicks and sabotages Donald and causes him to lose his clothes.

Pete Jr. tries to send the elevator back down to the lobby but Donald brings it back up to the eightieth floor. Donald tells him open the doors but he refuses. Donald keeps telling him to open the doors until he uses the hotel’s motto against Donald. While he returns Donald’s clothes, he offers to buy Donald a strawberry soda at the lobby but he sends the elevator down to the lobby at top speed.

Donald tells him to stop the elevator but he refuses. He stops when Donald begs him to, causing Donald to crash onto the elevator’s floor. Fed up with Pete Jr.’s antics, Donald spanks Pete Jr. and drags Pete Jr. to his boss before asking if he is fired. After his boss confirms, he pulls Pete Jr. behind a vase and continues spanking Pete Jr.. He breaks the Fourth Wall by cackling to the camera before going back to spanking Pete Jr.

== Voice cast ==
- Clarence Nash as Donald Duck
- John McLeish as Pete
- Glen Couch as Pete Jr.
- John Dehner as hotel manager

== Home media ==
The short was released on December 6, 2005 on Walt Disney Treasures: The Chronological Donald, Volume Two: 1942-1946.

== Television ==
This short was part of Donald Duck's 50th Birthday.
