= The Clock Watcher =

1945 Donald Duck cartoon

- Theatrical release poster
- Directed by: Jack King
- Story by: Harry Reeves; Rex Cox
- Produced by: Walt Disney
- Starring: Clarence Nash; John Dehner
- Music by: Oliver Wallace
- Animation by: Jack Hannah; Bill Justice; Judge Whitaker; Don Towsley
- Layouts by: Ernie Nordli
- Backgrounds by: Howard Dunn
- Color process: Technicolor
- Production company: Walt Disney Productions
- Distributed by: RKO Radio Pictures
- Release date: January 26, 1945 (U.S.)
- Running time: 7:34
- Country: United States
- Languages: English; French

The Clock Watcher is a 1945 American animated short film produced by Walt Disney Productions and released by RKO Radio Pictures. The cartoon follows Donald Duck as he works as a gift wrapper in a department store.

== Plot ==
Donald Duck works as a gift-wrapper at the Royal Brothers department store, where his unseen boss talks to him through a speaking tube. He struggles to package various items, resorting to unconventional methods like squashing a trombone and deflating a football, before abandoning his duties to read and eat lunch. At one point, Donald's boss announces that production has increased everywhere except the gift-wrapping department, which angers Donald.

Soon, a jack-in-the-box toy arrives, leads to escalating chaos as Donald tries to keep the toy from popping out of its box. After dealing with various mishaps and getting trapped in the box himself, Donald hears his boss tell him to work overtime at the end of the shift, prompting him to run up to his boss and attack him, destroying the speaking tube.

== Voice cast ==
- Clarence Nash as Donald Duck (uncredited)

== Home media ==
The short was released on December 6, 2005 on Walt Disney Treasures: The Chronological Donald, Volume Two: 1942-1946.
