= The Plausible Impossible =

- Disneyland episode
- Episode no.: Season 3 Episode 8
- Directed by: William Beaudine, Wilfred Jackson
- Teleplay by: Dick Huemer
- Cinematography by: Walter Castle
- Editing by: Sam Horta
- Original air date: October 31, 1956
- Running time: 52 minutes

Episode chronology
← Previous "Behind the Cameras at Lapland / Alaskan Eskimo"	Next → "Cameras in Samoa / The Holland Story"

"The Plausible Impossible" is an episode of the Disneyland television program, originally broadcast on October 31, 1956.

Walt Disney explains how drawings and animation make things that are impossible seem plausible, as evidenced in ancient history (i.e., Egyptian gods, dragons, and various creatures from Greek mythology) and various cartoons with Mickey Mouse and Donald Duck. This episode also includes an unfinished form of one scene from Snow White and the Seven Dwarfs (1937) that ultimately ended up on the cutting room floor and was not used in the final film. This episode culminates with the "Night on Bald Mountain" segment of Fantasia (1940).

The episode features the cartoons Donald's Cousin Gus and Thru the Mirror.

== Home media ==
The short was released on December 3, 2002, on Walt Disney Treasures: Behind the Scenes at the Walt Disney Studio.
