= Sighted sub, sank same =

"Sighted sub, sank same" was a signal sent by an American airman during World War II.

== History ==
Following Nazi Germany's declaration of war on the United States in December 1941, the German Navy's U-boat arm opened an offensive against US commerce on the east coast. Code-named Operation Drumbeat, German U-boats in January 1942 sank some 42 ships in US coastal waters, totalling some 230,000 tons. The US Navy's response was to instigate air and sea patrols, but with no success, while the U-boats continued to sink merchant ships with impunity.

It was against this backdrop that a Hudson of 82 Naval Patrol squadron, operating from Argentia in Newfoundland, sighted and attacked a surfaced U-boat on 28 January 1942. The U-boat disappeared and the pilot, Donald Francis Mason, sent the triumphant signal "Sighted sub, sank same".

This was passed on by Argentia commander, Admiral Bristol, to his superiors, Admirals Ingersoll and King. In the face of the other disastrous news from the Eastern Sea Frontier, Mason's report, and his laconic signal, was widely publicized as a success. However, post-war analysis revealed no U-boats destroyed that day, and it was held that Mason was in error in believing he had been successful.

Following the war it was even suggested that the story had been fabricated by a Navy publicist, but naval communications records confirm the message.

== Sources ==
- Blair, Clay (1996). Hitler's U-Boat War Vol I. Cassell. ISBN 0-304-35260-8.
- Famous Navy Quotations at Naval History and Heritage Command
