= Donald Gets Drafted =

1942 Donald Duck cartoon

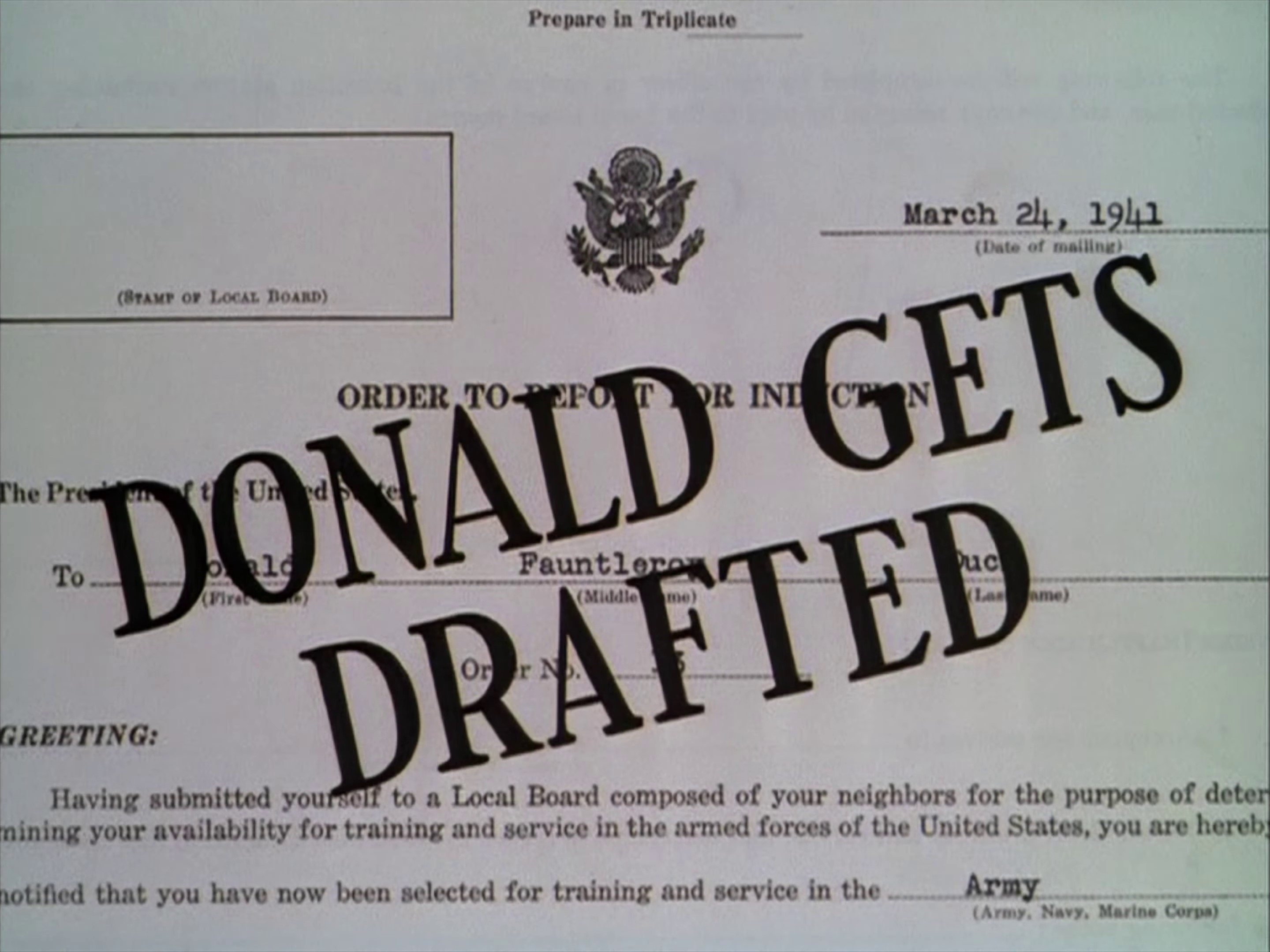
- Title card
- Directed by: Jack King
- Story by: Carl Barks; Jack Hannah; Harry Reeves
- Produced by: Walt Disney
- Starring: Billy Bletcher; John McLeish; Clarence Nash
- Music by: Leigh Harline
- Animation by: Paul Allen; Jim Armstrong; Hal King; Ed Love; Ray Patin; Retta Scott; Judge Whitaker
- Layouts by: Bill Herwig
- Color process: Technicolor
- Production company: Walt Disney Productions
- Distributed by: RKO Radio Pictures
- Release date: May 1, 1942; (USA)
- Running time: 8:55
- Country: United States
- Language: English

Donald Gets Drafted is a 1942 American animated short film produced by Walt Disney Productions and released by RKO Radio Pictures. The cartoon has Donald Duck being drafted into the U. S. Army during World War II and follows his introduction to military life. The film was directed by Jack King and introduced the song "The Army's Not the Army Anymore" by Carl Barks and Leigh Harline. It was also one out of two shorts in the series that featured Donald's drill sergeant hat in the opening headshot (with the other being his following short Sky Trooper). The voice cast includes Clarence Nash as Donald, John McLeish as an officer, and Billy Bletcher as Pete who is Donald's drill sergeant.

Donald Gets Drafted was the first of a six-part series, within the larger Donald Duck series, which shared a continuity of Donald serving in the army during World War II. The cartoon also revealed for the first time Donald's middle name - Fauntleroy - seen on his "Order to Report for Induction" form from the film's title screen.

== Plot ==
Filled with enthusiasm, Donald reports to his local draft board after receiving a draft notice. Along the way, he passes several recruiting posters that romanticize military life. Especially intrigued by one for the Air Force, featuring attractive women and the promise of escorting them around, Donald decides that he "wants to fly". After arriving at the draft board, Donald expresses his desire to join the Army Air Forces, adding excitedly, "I came from a family of aviators!" The desk officer directs Donald to a room where he is to undergo a physical examination.

Pete scolding Donald.

Inside the exam room, a team of white-coated doctors hurriedly pass Donald around, measuring him and testing his vital signs, vision, and hearing. Several gags during the scene emphasize the army's willingness to accept as many recruits as possible, such as a color vision test that Donald passes even after mistakenly identifying a green card as being blue. At the end of the exam Donald is issued a uniform - vastly oversized, but shrunk to fit thanks to a bucket of water dumped over his head - and has his rear end stamped with a large "OK".

During basic training, Donald's unit is marched around the field by the drill sergeant (Pete). Donald is distracted by some planes flying overhead, reminding him that he would rather be flying. His lack of concentration causes him to march out of step with the other soldiers and accidentally chop Pete's necktie in half with his rifle bayonet when he is ordered to turn "about face". Pete dismisses the other soldiers to drill Donald personally, but Donald's inability to understand Army jargon causes him to make a series of comical mistakes. Pete finally orders Donald to stand at attention, but Donald mistakenly stands over an anthill, and struggles to maintain his composure as the ants crawl all over him. Finally he snaps and scrabbles madly to get the ants off, accidentally firing his rifle several times and striking Pete as he climbs a tree to get away. Donald is later punished by being assigned to peel a roomful of potatoes, shaving off one peel to form his catchphrase "phooey" in response to the chorus' lyrics that describe the good conditions in the Army.

== Voice cast ==
- Donald Duck: Clarence Nash
- Sgt. Pete: Billy Bletcher
- Officer: John McLeish

== Background ==
The satirical humor in Donald Gets Drafted reflects an anti-military sentiment felt in particular by Carl Barks, one of the writers of the film. He had written the lyrics to the theme song, scripted the film, and also drew the recruitment posters which Donald passes on his way to the draft board. Barks himself was a pacifist who was against America's involvement in the war. He once said: "When I saw how little we accomplished with World War I, I thought, why in the devil kill off another whole generation of young men to accomplish the same result?" In Donald Gets Drafted Barks ridicules military recruitment, in particular its deceptive propaganda. The film is meant to draw a sharp distinction between the glamorous life presented in the posters outside the draft board compared to the reality Donald faces inside. Later, when Donald is at basic training, Barks pokes fun at military discipline, and even gives the sergeant a punishment of sorts by getting shot. This played well with audiences who were resentful of military strictness as America was mobilizing itself for war.

== Releases ==
- 1942 - original theatrical release
- 1984 - Donald Duck's 50th Birthday (TV special)
- 1997 - Ink & Paint Club, episode #1.31 "The Unseen Disney" (TV)

== Home media ==
The short was released on May 18, 2004 on Walt Disney Treasures: Walt Disney on the Front Lines. and on December 6, 2005 on Walt Disney Treasures: The Chronological Donald, Volume Two: 1942-1946.

Additional releases include:

- 1985 - "An Officer and a Duck" (VHS)

== See also ==
- List of World War II short films
