= Sky Trooper =

1942 Donald Duck cartoon

- Theatrical release poster
- Directed by: Jack King
- Story by: Carl Barks; Jack Hannah
- Produced by: Walt Disney
- Starring: Clarence Nash
- Music by: Frank Churchill
- Color process: Technicolor
- Production company: Walt Disney Productions
- Distributed by: RKO Radio Pictures
- Release date: November 6, 1942
- Running time: 7 minutes
- Country: United States
- Language: English

Sky Trooper is a 1942 animated cartoon by Walt Disney Studios starring Donald Duck during the World War II years. It was directed by Jack King based on a script by Carl Barks.

== Plot ==
Donald Duck is in trouble and is peeling potatoes. He wants desperately to fly, so he cuts a potato to look like an airplane. He throws it, and it catches Sergeant Black Pete's cap and brings it back to Donald, like a boomerang. Donald cuts it, thinking that it is a potato. When the sergeant comes in, he finds his cap cut in airplane shapes and finds out about Donald's ambition to fly. Donald is forced to peel tons more potatoes, but is promised the opportunity to fly after he cuts them all. After cutting all the potatoes, Donald reports to the Flight Sergeant's office and manages to fail all the equilibrium-finding exercises that the Sergeant comes up with, and when the Sergeant tells him to "pin the tail on that airplane", Donald obliges after walking on the outside ledge of the building (on the third floor), knocking over a huge vase. Donald makes his way back in, sticking the pin on the startled Sergeant, who falls all three stories.

The Sergeant gives Donald the chance to fly, albeit as a parachute troop. Donald, duped, goes along for the ride, and is surprised to find himself several thousand feet above the ground. Donald and the Sergeant fight, until both tumble out of the plane, but not before the Sergeant grabs a bomb to try to stay on, and it breaks away with them. On the way down, the two try to give the bomb to each other, until their fight is ended by their crashing into the General's Headquarters. The clip ends with the Sergeant and Donald, both with a cast on their leg and arm, respectively, and peeling potatoes. When Donald tells Pete "Boy, was that, sir, some surprise", Pete tells Donald "Ah, shut up!" and puts a potato on Donald's bill.

== Voice cast ==
- Donald Duck: Clarence Nash
- Pete: Billy Bletcher

== Home media ==
The short was released on May 18, 2004, on Walt Disney Treasures: Walt Disney on the Front Lines and on December 6, 2005, on Walt Disney Treasures: The Chronological Donald, Volume Two: 1942-1946.
