= Donald Duck filmography =

This is a list of appearances made by Donald Duck in Disney features and cartoons.

== Theatrical animated shorts and features ==
=== 1930s ===
==== 1934 ====
- The Wise Little Hen – in a Silly Symphony cartoon.
- Orphan's Benefit – in a Mickey Mouse cartoon.
- The Dognapper – in a Mickey Mouse cartoon.

==== 1935 ====
- The Band Concert – in a Mickey Mouse cartoon.
- Mickey's Service Station – in a Mickey Mouse cartoon.
- Mickey's Fire Brigade – in a Mickey Mouse cartoon.
- On Ice – in a Mickey Mouse cartoon.

==== 1936 ====
- Mickey's Polo Team – in a Mickey Mouse cartoon.
- Orphans' Picnic – in a Mickey Mouse cartoon.
- Mickey's Grand Opera – in a Mickey Mouse cartoon. Also, this is the last appearance of Donald in his original design.
- Moving Day – in a Mickey Mouse cartoon. Also, this is the first appearance of Donald in his modern form.
- Alpine Climbers – in a Mickey Mouse cartoon.
- Mickey's Circus – in a Mickey Mouse cartoon.
- Donald and Pluto – in a Mickey Mouse cartoon.

==== 1937 ====
- Don Donald - the first Donald Duck series cartoon.
- Magician Mickey – in a Mickey Mouse cartoon.
- Moose Hunters – in a Mickey Mouse cartoon.
- Mickey's Amateurs – in a Mickey Mouse cartoon.
- Modern Inventions – the last Disney cartoon released through United Artists.
- Hawaiian Holiday – in a Mickey Mouse cartoon.
- Clock Cleaners – in a Mickey Mouse cartoon.
- Donald's Ostrich - the first official Donald Duck cartoon.
- Lonesome Ghosts – in a Mickey Mouse cartoon.

==== 1938 ====
- Self Control
- Boat Builders – in a Mickey Mouse cartoon.
- Donald's Better Self
- Donald's Nephews - This cartoon shows the first appearance of Donald's three nephews, Huey, Dewey, and Louie.
- Mickey's Trailer – in a Mickey Mouse cartoon.
- Polar Trappers – in a Donald & Goofy cartoon.
- Good Scouts
- The Fox Hunt – in a Donald & Goofy cartoon.
- The Whalers – in a Mickey Mouse cartoon.
- Donald's Golf Game
- Mother Goose Goes Hollywood – This cartoon has a cameo appearance of Donald, in a Silly Symphony cartoon.

==== 1939 ====
- Donald's Lucky Day
- The Hockey Champ
- Donald's Cousin Gus - This cartoon shows Gus' first appearance.
- Beach Picnic – in a Donald and Pluto cartoon.
- Sea Scouts
- Donald's Penguin
- The Autograph Hound
- The Standard Parade – in a Mickey Mouse cartoon. Also, this second cartoon shows a cameo appearance of Donald.
- Officer Duck

=== 1940s ===
==== 1940 ====
- The Riveter
- Donald's Dog Laundry – in a Donald and Pluto cartoon.
- Tugboat Mickey – in a Mickey Mouse cartoon.
- Billposters – in a Donald & Goofy cartoon.
- Mr. Duck Steps Out - This cartoon marks the first appearance of Daisy Duck.
- Put-Put Troubles – in a Donald and Pluto cartoon.
- Donald's Vacation
- The Volunteer Worker - This film is a propaganda film, not an official Donald cartoon.
- Window Cleaners – in a Donald and Pluto cartoon.
- Fire Chief

==== 1941 ====
- Timber
- Golden Eggs
- A Good Time for a Dime
- The Nifty Nineties – in a Mickey Mouse cartoon. Also, this third cartoon shows a cameo appearance of Donald.
- Early to Bed
- Truant Officer Donald
- Orphan's Benefit – in a Mickey Mouse Cartoon, who is the remade version of the cartoon who's released on August 11, 1934.
- Old MacDonald Duck
- Donald's Camera
- Chef Donald

==== 1942 ====
- Donald's Decision - a World War II propaganda film.
- All Together – a World War II propaganda film.
- The Village Smithy
- The New Spirit - a World War II propaganda film.
- Mickey's Birthday Party – in a Mickey Mouse cartoon.
- Symphony Hour – in a Mickey Mouse cartoon.
- Donald's Snow Fight
- Donald Gets Drafted
- Donald's Garden
- Donald's Gold Mine
- The Vanishing Private
- Sky Trooper
- Bellboy Donald

==== 1943 ====
- Der Fuehrer's Face - a World War II anti-Nazi propaganda film and an Oscar winner.
- The Spirit of '43 - a World War II propaganda film.
- Donald's Tire Trouble
- Lake Titicaca - the segment of Saludos Amigos.
- Aquarela do Brasil - another segment of Saludos Amigos.
- The Flying Jalopy
- Fall Out Fall In
- The Old Army Game
- Home Defense

==== 1944 ====
- Trombone Trouble
- Donald Duck and the Gorilla
- Contrary Condor
- Commando Duck
- The Plastics Inventor
- Donald's Off Day

==== 1945 ====
- The Clock Watcher
- The Three Caballeros – in a Donald Duck, Jose Carioca & Panchito Pistoles film.
- The Eyes Have It
- Donald's Crime
- Duck Pimples
- No Sail – in a Donald & Goofy cartoon
- Cured Duck
- Old Sequoia

==== 1946 ====
- Donald's Double Trouble
- Wet Paint
- Dumb Bell of the Yukon
- Lighthouse Keeping
- Frank Duck Brings 'Em Back Alive – in a Donald & Goofy cartoon.

==== 1947 ====
- Straight Shooters
- Sleepy Time Donald
- Clown of the Jungle
- Donald's Dilemma
- Crazy with the Heat – in a Donald & Goofy cartoon.
- Bootle Beetle
- Wide Open Spaces
- Mickey and the Beanstalk – the segment of Fun and Fancy Free.
- Chip an' Dale

==== 1948 ====
- Drip Dippy Donald
- Daddy Duck
- Donald's Dream Voice
- Blame It On The Samba — the segment of Melody Time.
- The Trial of Donald Duck
- Inferior Decorator
- Soup's On
- Three for Breakfast
- Tea for Two Hundred

==== 1949 ====
- Donald's Happy Birthday
- Sea Salts
- Winter Storage
- Honey Harvester
- All in a Nutshell
- The Greener Yard
- Slide, Donald, Slide
- Toy Tinkers

=== 1950s ===
==== 1950 ====
- Lion Around
- Crazy Over Daisy
- Trailer Horn
- Hook, Lion and Sinker
- Bee at the Beach
- Out on a Limb

==== 1951 ====
- Dude Duck
- Corn Chips
- Test Pilot Donald
- Lucky Number
- Out of Scale
- Bee on Guard

==== 1952 ====
- Donald Applecore
- Let's Stick Together
- Uncle Donald's Ants
- Trick or Treat
- Pluto's Christmas Tree - in a Mickey Mouse cartoon. Also, this fourth cartoon shows a cameo appearance of Donald.

==== 1953 ====
- Don's Fountain of Youth
- The New Neighbor
- Rugged Bear
- Working for Peanuts
- Canvas Back Duck

==== 1954 ====
- Spare the Rod
- Donald's Diary
- Dragon Around
- Grin and Bear It
- The Flying Squirrel
- Grand Canyonscope - the first Disney film who is to be distributed by Buena Vista Distribution.

==== 1955 ====
- No Hunting
- Bearly Asleep
- Beezy Bear
- Up a Tree

==== 1956 ====
- Chips Ahoy - the final Donald Duck cartoon who is to be distributed by RKO Radio Pictures.
- How to Have an Accident in the Home

==== 1959 ====
- Donald in Mathmagic Land - an educational cartoon.
- How to Have an Accident at Work

=== 1960s ===
- Donald and the Wheel - another educational cartoon.
- The Litterbug - yet another educational cartoon.
- Steel & America - a commercial.
- Donald's Fire Survival Plan - 4th educational cartoon.
- Family Planning - 5th educational cartoon, "Planificacion Familiar", who is produced for the U.S. Population Council and distributed by Asociación Chilena de Protección de la Familia, an affiliate of Planned Parenthood.

=== 1980s ===
- Mickey's Christmas Carol - Mickey Mouse Featurette - This cartoon shows the last theatrical voice role of Clarence Nash.
- Destination: Career (1984) - educational release for EPCOT Media.
- Destination: Communications (1984) - educational release for EPCOT Media.
- Destination: Excellence (1984) - educational release for EPCOT Media.
- Destination: Science (1984) - educational release for EPCOT Media.
- Who Framed Roger Rabbit - This movie shows a cameo appearance of Donald, who's voiced on the role of Tony Anselmo.

=== 1990s ===
- The Prince and the Pauper - a Mickey Mouse Featurette.
- A Goofy Movie - This film shows a cameo appearance of Donald.
- Noah's Ark - the segment of Fantasia 2000.

=== 2000s ===
- Mickey's PhilharMagic, 3D theme park attraction, who is first opened in 2003.

=== 2020s ===
- Once Upon a Studio

== Disney home entertainment ==
Note: These are films that were originally released straight to VHS or DVD.

- Stuck on Christmas, a segment of Mickey's Once Upon a Christmas (1999).
- Mickey's Magical Christmas: Snowed in at the House of Mouse (2001) - compilation film.
- Mickey's House of Villains (2002) - compilation film.
- Belles on Ice, Christmas: Impossible, Donald's Gift, and Mickey's Dog-Gone Christmas, segments of Mickey's Twice Upon a Christmas (2004) - Animated film; Donald's Gift is a final cartoon starring Donald.
- Mickey, Donald, Goofy: The Three Musketeers (2004)

== Television ==
=== 1950s–1960s ===
Disneyland

- The Donald Duck Story (1954)
- A Day in the Life of Donald Duck (1956)
- On Vacation (1956)
- Where Do Stories Comes From (1956)
- The Plausible Impossible (1956)
- At Home with Donald Duck (1956)
- Your Host, Donald Duck (1956)
- Donald's Award (1957)
- Duck for Hire (1957)
- Mars and Beyond (1957) (cameo)
- Donald's Weekend (1958)
- Four Tales On A Mouse (1958) (cameo)

Walt Disney Presents

- Duck Files Coop (1959)
- The Adventures of Chip 'n' Dale (1959)
- Highway to Trouble (1959)
- Two Happy Amigos (1960)
- This is Your Life, Donald Duck (1960)
- The Mad Hermit Of Chimney Butte (1960)
- Donald's Silver Anniversary (1960)

The Wonderful World of Color

- An Adventure In Color (1961)
- The Hunting Instinct (1961)
- Inside Donald Duck (1961)
- Carnival Time (1962)
- Square Peg In A Round Hole (1963)
- Music For Everybody (1966)
- The Ranger of Brownstone (1968)

Note: Included are only episodes where Donald was featured in new animation

=== 1980s ===
- Donald Duck's 50th Birthday (1984)
- DuckTales (1987–1990, as recurring guest)
- Mickey's 60th Birthday (1988)

=== 1990s ===
- Bonkers (1993–1994, cameo)
- Quack Pack (1996)
- Mickey Mouse Works (1999–2000)
  - Donald's Failed Fourth (May 1, 1999, with Daisy Duck)
  - Donald's Shell Shots (May 8, 1999)
  - Donald's Rocket Ruckus (May 22, 1999)
  - Donald's Valentine Dollar (May 29, 1999)
  - Donald on Ice (September 11, 1999)
  - Donald's Dinner Date (September 18, 1999)
  - Donald and The Big Nut (October 3, 1999)
  - Donald's Dynamite : Snowman (November 7, 1999)
  - Donald's Grizzly Guest (November 7, 1999)
  - Computer.Don (January 1, 2000)
  - Survival of the Woodchucks (February 5, 2000)
  - Donald's Halloween Scare (March 4, 2000)
  - Donald's Lighthouse (March 4, 2000)
  - Domesticated Donald (March 16, 2000)
  - Donald's Fish Fry (September 23, 2000)
  - Bird Brained Donald (October 7, 2000)

=== 2000s ===
- House of Mouse (2001–2003)
  - Donald's Charmed Date (January 27, 2001)
  - Golf Nut Donald (February 17, 2001)
  - Music Store Donald (February 17, 2001)
  - Donald's Goofy World (March 10, 2001)
  - Mickey and the Color Caper (January 26, 2002, as "A Mickey, Donald and Goofy Cartoon")
  - Housesitters (September 2, 2002, as "A Mickey, Donald and Goofy Cartoon")
- Mickey Mouse Clubhouse (2006–2016) - Animated series.

=== 2010s ===
- Mickey Mouse (2013–2019)
- Mickey and the Roadster Racers/Mickey Mouse Mixed-Up Adventures (2017–2021)
- DuckTales (2017–2021)
- Legend of the Three Caballeros (2018)
- Mickey Go Local (2019)

=== 2020s ===
- The Wonderful World of Mickey Mouse (2020–2023)
- Mickey Mouse Funhouse (2021–2025)
- Chip 'n' Dale: Park Life (2021–2024)
- Mickey's Tale of Two Witches (2021)
- Mickey and Minnie Wish Upon a Christmas (2021)
- Mickey Saves Christmas (2022)
- Mickey and Friends Trick or Treats (2023)
- Mickey's Christmas Tales (2023)
- D.I.Y. Duck (2024)
- Donald Duck Tries to Keep His Cool While Eating Spicy Wings (2024)
- Mickey and the Very Many Christmases (2024)
- Mickey Mouse Clubhouse+ (2025–present)

== See also ==
- Donald Duck (film series)
