= Walt Disney's Funny Factory =

Disney home video series

Walt Disney's Funny Factory is a series of DVDs by Walt Disney Home Entertainment. Very similar to the line, each release would feature around one-hour of Disney animated short films, grouped by a starring character, or set of characters. As opposed to the chronological nature of the Walt Disney Treasures line, each release would feature various cartoons in no particular order. The series featured two waves of releases, on January 17, 2006, and November 21, 2006. Another similar line was Walt Disney’s Classic Cartoon Favorites.

== Releases ==
=== Wave 1 (2006) ===
The first wave of two releases was released on January 17, 2006.

==== Volume 1: Funny Factory with Mickey ====
All of the shorts on here feature Mickey Mouse.

1. Mickey and the Seal (1948)
2. Mr. Mouse Takes a Trip (1940)
3. Moose Hunters (1937)
4. Mickey's Parrot (1938)
5. The Pointer (1939)
6. Magician Mickey (1937)
7. Tugboat Mickey (1940)
8. R'coon Dawg (1951)

==== Volume 2: Funny Factory with Donald ====
All of the shorts on here feature Donald Duck.

1. Canvas Back Duck (1953)
2. Donald's Cousin Gus (1939)
3. Daddy Duck (1948)
4. Window Cleaners (1940)
5. Self Control (1938)
6. Contrary Condor (1944)
7. Donald's Golf Game (1938)

=== Wave 2 (2006) ===
The second wave of five releases came on November 21, 2006.

==== Volume 3: Funny Factory with Goofy ====
All of the shorts on here feature Goofy.

1. Goofy and Wilbur (1939)
2. Clock Cleaners (1937)
3. Goofy's Glider (1940)
4. Man's Best Friend (1952)
5. Father's Week End (1953)
6. Father's Lion (1952)
7. Aquamania (1961)

==== Volume 4: Funny Factory with Huey, Dewey & Louie ====
All of the shorts on here feature Donald Duck and Huey, Dewey, and Louie.

1. Donald's Nephews (1938)
2. Straight Shooters (1947)
3. Sea Scouts (1939)
4. Donald's Off Day (1944)
5. Lion Around (1950)
6. Soup's On (1948)
7. Don's Fountain of Youth (1953)
8. Lucky Number (1951)

== Reception ==
The "seemingly randomised order of the cartoons" makes these compilations more similar to the Cartoon Favorites line rather than to the Disney Treasures.

A review at Animation Magazine wrote that "Unlike Disney's popular tin editions, these single discs don't appear to offer any bonus features, but the low price should make them popular with collectors and casual fans nonetheless"

A review of the Mickey volume at DVD Talk found that "Who this is really for is little kids. The old Disney cartoons, while not especially funny, are cute and lively, and not rerun constantly like the Warner Bros. ones are. So the tots of today may not be as familiar with these, and they will surely find them delightful up to about the age of 8. Everyone else can skip them. Real fans will get the same material on better collections, and casual fans won't find any of these particular cartoons noteworthy." while the Donald volume was assessed as follows: "Donald is no Daffy, that's for sure, and adults aren't going to find more than a few chuckles in any of these. Kids will no doubt find them hilarious indeed -- but if you're going to shell out bucks on cartoons for the kids, why not spend a few more and get a quality set? "

Another review of the Mickey volume stated "For anyone who has decided not to collect all the shorts of Disney's landmark mouse (and now, with three of his four Treasures difficult and fairly pricey to obtain, that's an understandable move for someone very late to the Disney DVD game), Funny Factory with Mickey makes for a pretty nice sampling of his years in color."
