= Dewford =

Dewford may refer to:

- Dewford town, in the Pokémon franchise
- Dewey Duck, full name Dewford Dingus Duck in DuckTales (2017)
