= Jack Hannah =

American animator (1913–1994)

- Born: John Fredrick Hannah; January 5, 1913; Nogales, Arizona, U.S.
- Died: June 11, 1994 (aged 81); Burbank, California, U.S.
- Education: California Institute of the Arts
- Occupations: Animator, writer, director of Disney
- Years active: 1933–1984
- Children: 2

John Fredrick Hannah (January 5, 1913 – June 11, 1994) was an American animator, writer and director of animated shorts. He worked for Disney and Walter Lantz.

== Biography ==
Hannah was born on January 5, 1913, in Nogales, Arizona. After attending grammar school in Nogales, Arizona and high school in National City, California, he moved to Los Angeles in 1931 to study at the Art Guild Academy. One of his first jobs was designing movie posters for Hollywood theaters for the advertising firm Foster & Kleiser. In 1933, during the Great Depression, Hannah dropped off his portfolio at Walt Disney Studios, and soon afterward was hired as an in-between and clean-up artist, working on Mickey Mouse, Donald Duck, and Silly Symphony cartoons.

Hannah's career as an animator commenced with the short Modern Inventions (released on May 29, 1937). After thirteen films in that capacity, he was assigned to the story department writing cartoon short continuities, beginning with Donald's Nephews (released on April 15, 1938). He received writing credit on 21 Disney cartoon shorts.

In 1942, he collaborated with Carl Barks on the first two comic books Barks worked on, Pluto Saves the Ship and Donald Duck Finds Pirate Gold. Hannah in subsequent years did a handful of other Donald Duck comic book stories but, unlike Barks, he stayed at the studio and eventually was given a chance to be a director. The short Donald's Off Day (released on December 8, 1944) was the first of 94 films he would direct. These include most of the shorts featuring Donald Duck in the post-war era along with all starring Chip 'n' Dale and Humphrey the Bear; he also directed some shorts starring Goofy, Mickey Mouse, Pluto and some minor Disney characters such as Lambert the Sheepish Lion.

After Disney stopped producing animated shorts, Hannah did 14 episodes of the Walt Disney anthology television series (composed of footage from the classic cartoons along with new linking material) and fulfilled his ambition to direct live-action by handling Walt Disney's introductions for the episodes. Hannah hoped to segue into a career in live-action but "Walt had me pegged as an animation director so he balked at the suggestion. We had a few heated discussions and I became aware that I had come to an impasse." Hannah eventually left for Walter Lantz Productions in 1960 and directed a number of films featuring Woody Woodpecker; most of the Woody Woodpecker, Chilly Willy, and Dynamo Doc shorts directed by Hannah had music by former Warner Bros. Cartoons composer and songwriter Eugene Poddany, who composed the shorts from 1960 to 1962, replaced by Darrell Calker, who composed from 1961 to 1964, and Clarence Wheeler who composed for Lantz from 1950 to 1967, and one short directed by Jack Hannah had Walter Greene as composer and Charles Mintz veteran Sid Marcus as director entitled Greedy Gabby Gator (released on January 1, 1963) and some minor characters. Besides directing shorts, Hannah also was assistant director for the television series The Woody Woodpecker Show, which began airing on October 3, 1957. "I did more or less the same thing that I did with Walt Disney in directing live-action except Lantz was better at taking direction." For his final days at Lantz, his shorts needed animation by Art Davis until he left in April 1963. His last directing effort was the short Charlie's Mother in Law (released on April 16, 1963). He retired shortly thereafter and replaced by Sid Marcus, who co-directed the Woody Woodpecker short Greedy Gabby Gator, released in 1963 with Jack Hannah as co-director with Sid Marcus, who directed at Lantz until 1967.

In 1975, Hannah was one of the co-founders, along with T. Hee, of the Character Animation program at the California Institute of the Arts.

Hannah was honored as a "Disney Legend" in 1992. Jack Hannah is often credited with developing, if not creating, the personality of the animated version of Donald Duck. It is for this reason Disney historian Jim Korkis has dubbed him "Donald Duck's Other Daddy." Despite that, Hannah has often been noted for being responsible for Donald's most formulaic period, where constantly paired Donald with pint-sized antagonists. The most famous of these antagonists are Chip 'n Dale, but other characters included Spike the Bee, Bootle Beetle and a colony of ants. These vermin became the focus of their shorts, relegating Donald to a supporting foil role with a consequent personality diminution.

Hannah died from cancer in Burbank, California on June 11, 1994, at age 81. He is survived by his wife and two children.

== Filmography ==
=== Films ===
Year	Title	Credits	Notes
1934	Servants' Entrance	animator	
1934	Gulliver Mickey	animator	
1936	Toby Tortoise Returns	animator	
1936	Donald and Pluto	animator	
1936	The Country Cousin	animator	
1937	Don Donald	animator	
1937	Woodland Café	animator	
1937	Modern Inventions	animator	
1937	The Old Mill	animator	
1937	Donald's Ostrich	animator	
1938	Self Control	animator	
1938	Donald's Better Self	story and animation	
1938	Donald's Nephews	story and animation	
1938	Donald's Golf Game	animator	
1938	Good Scouts	animator	
1939	Sea Scouts	animator	
1939	Donald's Penguin	animator	
1939	Donald's Lucky Day	story and animation	
1939	The Hockey Champ	story and animation	
1939	Donald's Cousin Gus	story	
1939	Beach Picnic	story	
1940	Mr. Duck Steps Out	story	
1940	Donald's Vacation	story and animation	
1940	Window Cleaners	story	
1940	Fire Chief	story	
1941	Timber	story	
1941	Golden Eggs	story	
1941	Early to Bed	story	
1941	Truant Officer Donald	story	
1941	Old MacDonald Duck	story	
1941	Chef Donald	story	
1942	Sky Trooper	story	
1942	The Army Mascot	story	
1942	Donald Gets Drafted	story	
1942	Donald's Snow Fight	animator	
1942	Bellboy Donald	story	
1942	Donald's Garden	animator	
1942	Out of the Frying Pan and into the Firing Line	animator	
1943	Home Defense	story	
1943	The Old Army Game	story	
1944	Trombone Trouble	story	
1944	Donald Duck and the Gorilla	story	
1944	Commando Duck	story	Last WWII Donald Duck cartoon.
1944	The Plastics Inventor	story	
1944	Donald's Off Day	director	The first theatrical cartoon to be directed by Jack Hannah.
1945	The Eyes Have It	director	
1945	No Sail	director	
1946	Double Dribble	director	
1946	Squatter's Rights	director	
1946	A Knight for a Day	director	
1946	Lighthouse Keeping	director	
1946	Frank Duck Brings 'em Back Alive	director	
1947	Clown of the Jungle	director	
1947	Bootle Beetle	director	
1947	Straight Shooters	director	
1947	Chip an' Dale	director	
1947	Foul Hunting	director	
1948	They're Off	director	Last Goofy cartoon to be directed by Jack Hannah.
1948	Daddy Duck	director	
1948	Inferior Decorator	director	
1948	Soup's On	director	
1948	Three for Breakfast	director	
1948	Tea for Two Hundred	director	
1949	All in a Nutshell	director	
1949	Slide, Donald, Slide	director	
1949	Honey Harvester	director	
1949	Donald's Happy Birthday	director	
1949	Winter Storage	director	
1949	The Greener Yard	director	
1949	Sea Salts	director	
1949	Toy Tinkers	director	
1950	Lion Around	director	Debut of Louie the Mountain Lion.
1950	Crazy Over Daisy	director	Jack Hannah's only such cartoon to feature Daisy Duck.
1950	Trailer Horn	director	
1950	Hook, Lion and Sinker	director	
1950	Bee at the Beach	director	
1950	Out on a Limb	director	
1951	Chicken in the Rough	director	
1951	Dude Duck	director	
1951	Test Pilot Donald	director	
1951	Corn Chips	director	
1951	Lucky Number	director	
1951	Out of Scale	director	
1951	Bee on Guard	director	
1952	Two Chips and a Miss	director	
1952	Lambert the Sheepish Lion	director	
1952	Donald Applecore	director	
1952	Let's Stick Together	director	
1952	Uncle Donald's Ants	director	
1952	Trick or Treat	director	
1952	Pluto's Christmas Tree	director	
1953	Don's Fountain of Youth	director	
1953	The New Neighbor	director	
1953	Rugged Bear	director	Jack Hannah's first cartoon starring Humphrey the Bear.
1953	Working for Peanuts	director	
1953	Canvas Back Duck	director	
1954	Spare the Rod	director	
1954	Dragon Around	director	
1954	Grin and Bear It	director	Debut of Ranger J. Audubon Woodlore.
1954	The Flying Squirrel	director	
1955	No Hunting	director and voice (of Moose)	Jack Hannah's first cartoon in CinemaScope, as well as his only CinemaScope cartoon without Humphrey involved.
1955	Bearly Asleep	director	
1955	Beezy Bear	director	Final pairing with Donald and Humphrey in the Golden age of American animation.
1955	Up a Tree	director	Last Donald Duck cartoon to be directed by Jack Hannah, as well as Jack Hannah's last Disney cartoon not filmed in CinemaScope. Jack Hannah's last cartoon starring Chip 'n' Dale.
1956	Hooked Bear	director	First solo Humphrey cartoon.
1956	3D Jamboree	director	the "Working for Peanuts" short
1956	In the Bag	director	Jack Hannah's last Disney cartoon, as well as his last one to be filmed in CinemaScope. Second and last solo Humphrey cartoon.
1959	Bric's Stew	story	Only UPA cartoon ever written by Jack Hannah.
1960	Donald Duck and his Companions	story and animation	
1960	Freeloading Feline	director and story	Jack Hannah's first cartoon made at Walter Lantz Productions. First solo Doc cartoon ever produced.
1960	Hunger Strife	director	Debut of Fatso the Bear. Jack Hannah's first cartoon to feature Inspector Willoughby, though he was characterized as a park ranger.
1960	Southern Fried Hospitality	director	First Woody Woodpecker cartoon to be directed by Jack Hannah. Debut of Gabby Gator.
1960	Jungle Medics	director and story	
1961	Poop Deck Pirate	director	
1961	Eggnapper	director	Last time that Inspector Willoughby was defined as a park ranger. Jack Hannah's last cartoon starring Inspector Willoughby.
1961	Gabby's Diner	director	
1961	Clash and Carry	director	First Chilly Willy cartoon to be directed by Jack Hannah. Jack Hannah's first cartoon starring Wally Walrus.
1961	Bear and the Bees	director	Last appearance of Fatso the Bear. The only time that Fatso appeared without Inspector Willoughby.
1961	Franken-Stymied	director	Jack Hannah's second and last Woody Woodpecker cartoon without Gabby Gator in it.
1961	Tricky Trout	director	Jack Hannah's last cartoon starring Wally Walrus.
1961	Tin Can Concert	director and story	Only Doc cartoon without Champ in it.
1961	Doc's Last Stand	director	
1961	Woody's Kook-Out	director	
1962	Rock-a-Bye Gator	director	
1962	Pest of Show	director	
1962	Mackerel Moocher	director	Jack Hannah's first Chilly Willy cartoon without Wally Walrus in it.
1962	Fowled-Up Birthday	director	
1962	Rocket Racket	director	
1962	Mother's Little Helper	director	
1962	Voo-Doo Boo-Boo	director	Last Woody Woodpecker cartoon to be directed by Jack Hannah.
1962	Punchy Pooch	director	
1962	Corny Concerto	director	Last time where Doc appeared in.
1963	Fish and Chips	director	Jack Hannah's last theatrical cartoon, as well as his only one to feature Smedley Dog.

=== TV series ===
- Disneyland (1954–79)
  - The Donald Duck Story (director and story; 1954)
  - Adventures of Mickey Mouse (director; 1955)
  - At Home with Donald Duck (director; 1956)
  - The Great Cat Family (segment director; 1956)
  - Where Do the Stories Come From? (director; 1956)
  - On Vacation (director; 1956)
  - A Day in the Life of Donald Duck (director;1956)
  - Duck for Hire (director; 1957)
  - Donald's Award (director; 1957)
  - All About Magic (sequence director; 1957)
  - Your Host, Donald Duck (director;1957)
  - From All of Us to All of You (director; 1958)
  - Four Tales on a Mouse (director: Christmas sequence; 1958)
  - Donald's Weekend (director; 1958)
  - Highway to Trouble (director;1959)
  - Duck Flies Coop (director; 1959)
  - Two Happy Amigos (director;1960)
  - This Is Your Life Donald Duck (director;1960)
  - Kids Is Kids (segment director; 1961)
  - A Square Peg in a Round Hole (segment director; 1963)
  - The Ranger of Brownstone (sequence director; 1968)
  - Baseball Fever (director; 1979) (archive footage only)
- The Woody Woodpecker Show (1957–58)
- Matty's Funday Funnies (TV series) (1962; story)
