= Rival Romeos =

1928 film

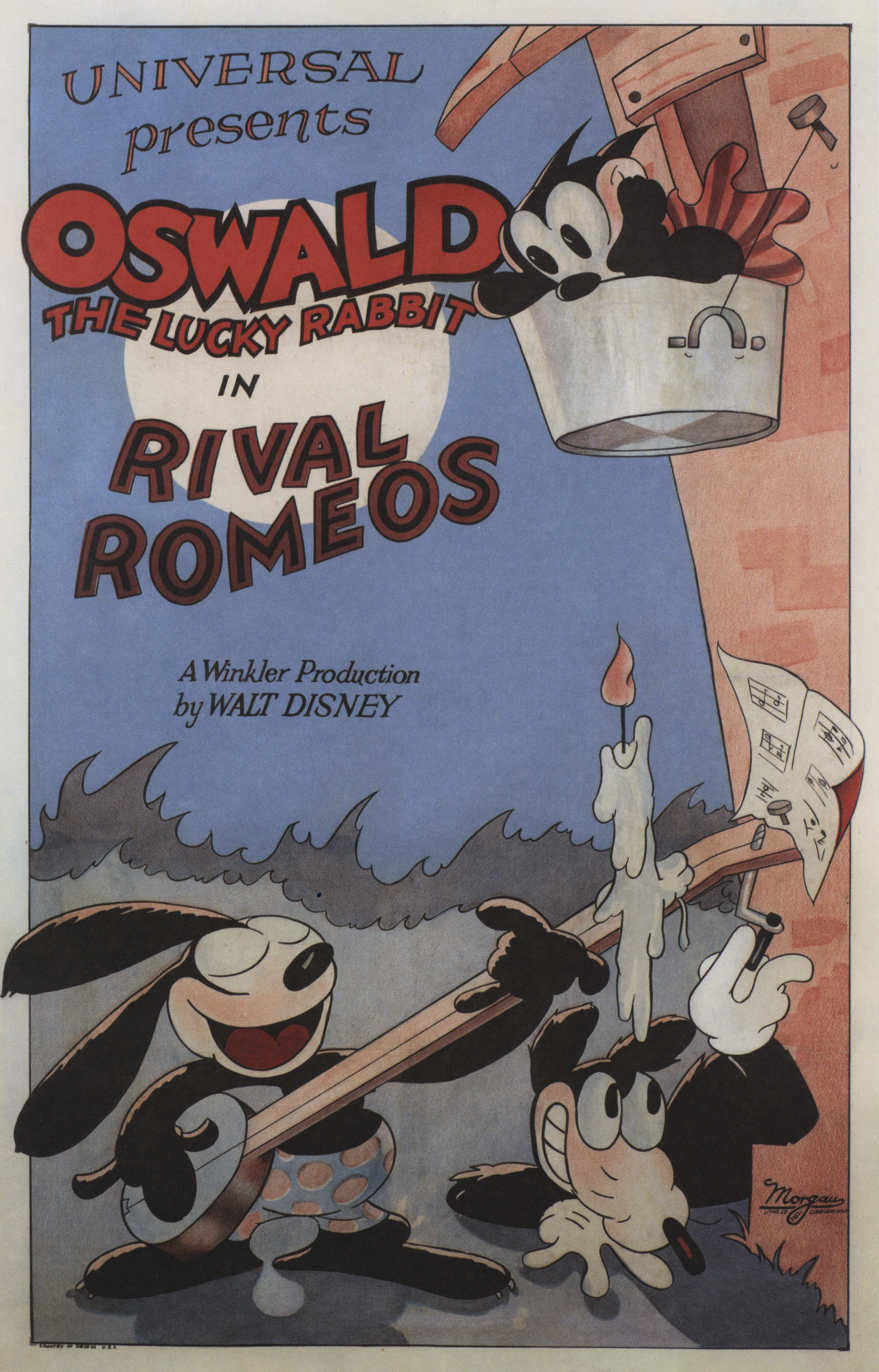
- Theatrical poster
- Directed by: Walt Disney
- Produced by: Charles Mintz; George Winkler
- Animation by: Ub Iwerks
- Color process: Black and white
- Production company: Winkler Pictures
- Distributed by: Universal Pictures
- Release date: March 5, 1928
- Running time: 6:18
- Country: United States
- Language: English (slient)

Rival Romeos is a 1928 American animated short film directed by Walt Disney and distributed by Universal Pictures. It was released on March 5, 1928 and entered the public domain on January 1, 2024.

== Plot ==
The short starts with Oswald driving along in his car, holding a bundle of flowers and fantasising about Ortensia. We cut to Pete driving along the road in a fancier and bigger car, smoking a big cigar whilst also fantasising about Ortensia.

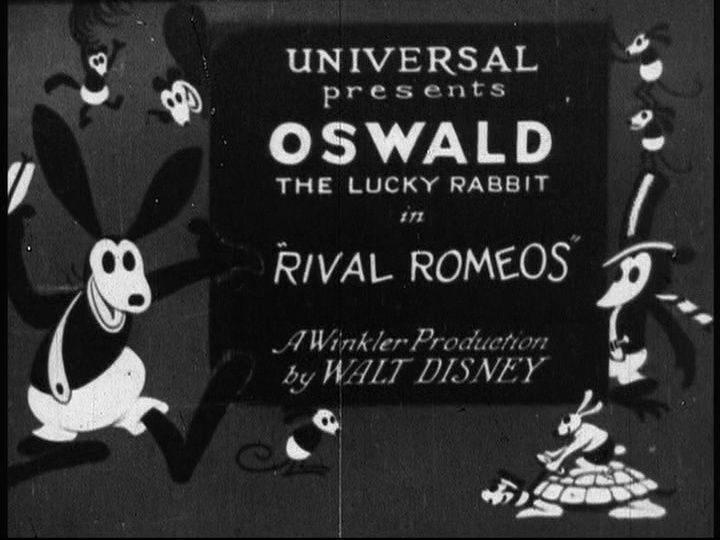
Title card

He spots Oswald driving in front of him and honks his horn. Oswald notices and blocks Pete from passing. One of the 'honks' taps on Oswald's head and gestures for him to move aside. We cut back to Pete as he pulls a lever on the side of his car that makes it taller. He then drives over Oswald's car before racing off ahead.

Pete's car comes to a puddle of mud and refuses to drive through it, while Oswald's car has no problem. Pete's car is forced to go through the mud, but it slips and falls in.

Full short

We cut back to Oswald, who is driving up to Ortensia's house. He throws the bundle of flowers up to the balcony, and lays down his sheet music on a nearby rock. He then begins to play his guitar and sing. We cut to Ortensia in the balcony, who hears the music. Unfortunately, as Oswald is playing, a fly lands on his sheet music.

We cut to a goat passing by. He sees the pile of Oswald's sheet music, and begins to eat it. We cut back to Oswald playing, just as his sheet music blows off of the rock. He struggles to keep it from blowing off, eventually pinning to the rock, which turns out to be a pig. Oswald spots the goat, who has eaten all of the sheet music and is eating the guitar. Oswald tries to pull the guitar out of its mouth, which is unsuccessful. He then tries to use the goat as a music player.

We cut to a man, probably Ortensia's father, in his bedroom as he is woken up by the sound of the music. He proceeds to throw everything in the room at Oswald and the goat, who both flee. We cut Oswald hiding behind his car, laughing at Ortensia's father, just as Pete arrives in his car. Both Oswald and Pete want to take Ortensia in their cars, which results in a tug-of-war with Ortensia. Angrily, she storms off. Then a dog riding a bicycle comes along and offers Ortensia a ride. Oswald and Pete are too busy fighting to notice, and they both stop when Ortensia goes past in the bicycle. They proceed to kick each other in the behind in shame to punish themselves.

== Release ==
A restored version of Rival Romeos with sound was released on December 11, 2007, as part of Walt Disney Treasures: The Adventures of Oswald the Lucky Rabbit.
