= Donald's Happy Birthday =

1949 Donald Duck cartoon

- Theatrical release poster
- Directed by: Jack Hannah
- Written by: Nick George; Bill Berg
- Produced by: Walt Disney
- Starring: Clarence Nash
- Music by: Oliver Wallace
- Animation by: Bob Carlson; Volus Jones; Bill Justice; Jack Boyd
- Layouts by: Yale Gracey
- Backgrounds by: Ralph Hulett
- Color process: Technicolor
- Production company: Walt Disney Productions
- Distributed by: RKO Radio Pictures
- Release date: February 11, 1949
- Running time: 6:40
- Country: United States
- Language: English

Donald's Happy Birthday is a 1949 Donald Duck cartoon featuring Donald Duck and his nephews Huey, Dewey, and Louie. In the short film, Huey, Dewey, and Louie would like to buy a box of cigars for Donald's birthday but Donald decides to keep the money.

== Plot ==
On March 13, Huey, Dewey, and Louie are in their tree house debating what to get their uncle Donald for his birthday, ultimately settling on a box of cigars. Their plans are halted when they realize they do not have the required $2.98. To raise funds, the boys do a frenzied set of chores for Donald's lawn and gardens, after which they hand Donald an invoice for $2.98. Finding the charges reasonable, Donald happily pays the boys, but then immediately forces them to deposit the funds in a locking musical coin bank (the song lyrics of which advise the boys to "Take my advice/Do as I say/Save a little money for a rainy day"). Later, believing Donald to be napping, the boys take the bank and sneak it to their tree house to open it, but Donald, not actually asleep, gets up and follows the boys. After admonishing them, he takes the coin bank and returns it to the house.

A subsequent attempt to take the coin bank fares better, and the boys run off with the money. Donald uses his telescope to spot the trio exiting the cigar store, and mistakenly concludes they bought the cigars to smoke themselves. A furious Donald then makes his nephews forcibly smoke all of the cigars themselves to teach them a lesson, and the triplets end up passing out due to extreme smoke inhalation. Just as the cigar box is emptied, Donald discovers a birthday card written by the trio inside the box, making him realize that the triplets were actually going to give the cigars to him as a birthday present. Horrified of what he has done, Donald shrinks out of shame and jumps out a hole in the tree house floor.

== Voice cast ==
- Clarence Nash as Donald Duck, Huey, Dewey, and Louie

== Continuity of Donald's birth date ==
Although this short lists Donald's birthday as March 13, Disney later decided that Donald's official birthday would be celebrated on June 9, the date of his film debut.

== Home media ==
The short was released on December 11, 2007, on Walt Disney Treasures: The Chronological Donald, Volume Three: 1947-1950.
