= An Eye for Detail =

Donald Duck story by Don Rosa

- Story code: D 94121
- Story: Don Rosa
- Ink: Don Rosa
- Hero: Donald Duck
- Pages: 10
- Layout: 4 rows per page
- Appearances: Donald Duck; Huey, Dewey, and Louie; Scrooge McDuck; Beagle Boys

"An Eye for Detail" is a 1997 Donald Duck comics story by Don Rosa.

The story was first published in the Danish Anders And & Co. #1997-19; the first American publication was in Walt Disney's Comics and Stories #622, in March 1998.

== Plot ==
Donald Duck is working for Scrooge McDuck by cleaning his office, and Huey, Dewey and Louie are helping him. When they are working, Scrooge notices that Donald can tell Huey, Dewey and Louie apart from each other despite them looking almost completely identical. This gives Scrooge an idea, and he takes Donald to an ophthalmologist, who discovers Donald has developed extraordinarily sharp eyesight through years of trying to tell his nephews apart. Scrooge seeks to exploit this ability by hiring Donald as a quality inspector in his factories. There it is revealed Donald's skill only works on a subconscious level, and he causes multiple accidents on the job. His third assignment ends in a disaster when a large steel oven that Donald had been inspecting falls down. Any large catastrophic results are avoided, but Donald decides he has had enough and feigns that he has lost his sharp eyesight, in order to return to his normal, safe job.
