= Donald's Fire Survival Plan =

- Theatrical release poster
- Directed by: Les Clark
- Written by: William Bosche
- Produced by: Walt Disney
- Starring: Clarence Nash
- Narrated by: Walt Disney
- Music by: George Bruns
- Production company: Walt Disney Productions
- Distributed by: Buena Vista Distribution; Walt Disney Educational Media Company (1984 version)
- Release dates: May 5, 1966; August 1, 1984 (revision)
- Running time: 11 minutes
- Country: United States
- Language: English

Donald's Fire Survival Plan is an 11-minute Donald Duck educational cartoon released on May 5, 1966. The film was directed by Les Clark. This animated short focuses on fire safety in the home. The original release of this short included a live-action introduction from Walt Disney. It was re-released in August 1984 without the Walt Disney introduction.

== Plot ==
=== Introduction ===
The feature opens with the image of a burning house which pans out to reveal Walt Disney watching the scene on a television screen. Walt goes on to explain how many homes are lost to house fires every day in the United States and how many lives are lost, over a third of those being small children.

With the cooperation of local and national fire service authorities, the Disney company produced this short to instruct families on proper home fire safety precautions.

=== Setup ===
The feature transitions from Walt Disney to a now animated house on fire, which is "rewound" to show the house undamaged before zooming in through the window to find Donald Duck sitting in an armchair, reading. A few feet from him are his three nephews, Huey, Dewey and Louie drawing up a fire escape plan in crayon. The boys explain to their Uncle that their school teacher had instructed them to design a plan in the event of a fire. They continue to suggest they find two separate exits from every room as well as choose a rendezvous point outside of the house in order to make sure everyone has escaped the building. Donald reacts nonplussed and attempts to brush his nephews away. The boys continue to explain they need collapsible ladders from the second floor. When they rehearse the use of a whistle as an alarm in the event of a fire at night, Donald loses his patience and angrily sends his nephews away. Immediately afterward Donald falls asleep in his armchair.

=== Common Sense ===
In Donald's dream appears his sense of precaution, or his Common Sense, depicted as a smaller Donald Duck wearing a fireman's coat and hat. Common Sense argues with Donald about not paying attention to his nephews, who were only trying to prepare him in the event of an emergency. Donald claims he doesn't need to prepare so Common Sense whisks him off to show him how unsafe his home is.

Common Sense shows Donald a what-if scenario where a fire starts in his living room and what happens when the entire house is asleep. If Donald left his door open as he slept, the smoke mixed with noxious fumes would potentially kill him before the fire even made it up the stairs. If he had closed his door, the barrier would offer him a short window of fifteen to twenty minutes before the smoke and heat would overtake him. Common Sense tells Donald that in most cases, one would generally use natural exits to leave dangerous situations such as a door but during a fire that could be catastrophic. The best solution to exiting his room would be the window, but as his bedroom is on the second floor he would be stuck without a way down.

Donald abruptly wakes from his sporadic nap and takes immediate action to prevent a fire emergency. He takes Huey, Dewey and Louie's crayon plan and sticks it up on the wall. He puts in a collapsible ladder in his room, makes sure the windows throughout the house open easily from the inside and the screens are easily removed, and adds a ladder to his garage for others to use from the outside. He gathers his nephews to tell them what the plan is in the event of an emergency, stressing that they should remain calm and never hide under the bed or in the closet as that can be a fatal mistake. Donald then initiates a fire drill where we see how the nephews escape their room through their window and down the ladder he placed outside. The instructions end with Donald and the boys going to a public fire department call box.

The video ends with another live-action sequence featuring Walt Disney. He and Common Sense tell the audience that if "we can't make a plan, or don't know how", to contact local fire departments and they should be able to devise a plan for us.

=== 1984 revision ===
This educational short was revised in 1984, excluding the original Walt Disney introduction. Instead, the same information is relayed via a voice over. There are new short live-action sequences enacted by human versions of Donald Duck as well as his nephews. The scenes involving Common Sense remain the original 1966 animated versions.

Additions included in the 1984 revision consist of implementing smoke alarms in the home as well as the use of the EDITH system (Exit Drills In The Home).

== Voice cast ==
- Clarence Nash as Donald Duck
- Walt Disney as Himself
- Dick Beals as Huey, Dewey and Louie
- Richard Bakalyan as Common Sense
- Dave Bodin as Uncle Don (1984 version)
- Randy Josselyn as Huey (1984 version)
- Mark-Paul Gosselaar as Dewey (1984 version)
- Josh Miller as Louie (1984 version)
- Hal Smith as Common Sense (1984 version)
