= Good Scouts =

1938 Donald Duck cartoon

- Donald and his nephews arrive at their camp site.
- Directed by: Jack King
- Story by: Carl Barks; Harry Reeves
- Produced by: Walt Disney
- Starring: Clarence Nash
- Music by: Oliver Wallace
- Animation by: Paul Allen; Al Eugster; Frank Follmer; Jack Hannah; Ed Love
- Color process: Technicolor
- Production company: Walt Disney Productions
- Distributed by: RKO Radio Pictures
- Release date: July 8, 1938; (USA)
- Running time: 8 minutes
- Country: United States
- Language: English

Good Scouts is a 1938 American animated short film produced by Walt Disney Productions and released by RKO Radio Pictures. The cartoon follows Donald Duck leading his three nephews Huey, Dewey, and Louie on a scouting trip through Yellowstone National Park. It was directed by Jack King and features Clarence Nash as Donald and the three nephews.

Good Scouts was nominated for an Academy Award for Best Animated Short Film at the 11th Academy Awards in 1939, but lost to Disney's own Ferdinand the Bull. Also nominated that year from Disney were Brave Little Tailor and Mother Goose Goes Hollywood, setting the record for most nominations in the category for one studio. Good Scouts was the first Academy Award nomination for the Donald Duck series.

== Plot ==
Donald Duck and his three nephews Huey, Dewey, and Louie are on a scouting expedition at Yellowstone National Park, with Donald acting as the scoutmaster and the nephews as scouts. The ducks march along in military style singing "Polly Wolly Doodle". Arriving at their camp site, Donald unsuccessfully tries to teach the nephews wilderness skills. He tries to chop down a petrified tree and pitch a tent with a bad knot, causing the nephews to laugh.

Frustrated at the nephews' lack of gratitude for his efforts, Donald decides to make them sorry by pretending to have been injured, pouring ketchup over himself. The nephews mistake it for blood and bandage Donald from head to toe. His eyes become bandaged, causing Donald to be unable to see. He wanders aimlessly, eventually falling into a honey jar, which covers him in honey.

A grizzly bear arrives and scares away the nephews before licking the honey off of Donald, who accidentally angers the bear when he smacks the bear in the face, thinking that the nephews are licking him. When he removes the bandage that is covering his eyes, he realizes who was licking him. Trying to escape the bear, Donald runs off of a cliff and gets his butt wedged in a hole. After he feels the ground shake, he reads a sign that reveals that the hole is the opening of "Old Reliable Geyser" which erupts at 12:00. When he looks at his watch, he discovers that it is 12:00. Water shoots Donald into the air, bringing him closer to the bear who is still above at the cliff's edge.

The nephews try to save Donald by plugging the geyser with a long log and then with three stones, all of which prove unsuccessful. They finally roll a large boulder over it, but the geyser is only stopped momentarily before bursting again, with the water shooting Donald and the boulder up to the same level of the cliff, allowing the bear to jump on top of the boulder to chase Donald, with the boulder rotating under their feet, perfectly balanced on top of the continuous stream of water from the geyser. By night, the chase is still going on, and the nephews, having exhausted their means of rescuing their uncle, bed down in their tent.

== Character development ==
Carl Barks (standing with pointer) and Harry Reeves (clowning) present the storyboard for Good Scouts in 1937.

Good Scouts was the second animated appearance of Huey, Dewey, and Louie, who had first appeared in the Donald Duck comics, and marked a significant change in their behavior. In their earlier appearances, the triplets were mischievous and caused a lot of trouble for Donald, but in Good Scouts the boys seem to have matured a great deal. They are shown as being resourceful, using teamwork, and generally trying to help Donald out of trouble. Although the boys are seen as mischievous in several later appearances, it was this more helpful characterization which would become more characteristic of them, in particular the classical comics written and drawn by Carl Barks. Barks would also often portray the triplets as members of the Junior Woodchucks, a fictional scout movement (albeit not with Donald as a scoutmaster).

The film was also the first to show Donald in a leadership role. In earlier appearances he was "someone just trying to go about his business and getting interrupted and irritated by others". As such, the film was an influence on later films such as Sea Scouts (1939) and Home Defense (1943).

== Promotion ==
On July 8, 1938, The Film Daily printed an item about the Disney Studio's promotion of the cartoon: "With the release of "Good Scouts", a Disney with Donald Duck and his three nephews on high adventure in Yellowstone National Park... lookit!... a drawing of Donald and his nephews in Boy Scout uniform was presented to Dr. West, Chief Scout Executive, and an 8x10 print for each of a thousand Scout executives throughout the nation... publicity releases to 5,400 newspapers... reproduction of drawing in current Boys' Life and Scouting mags... stories in scout magazines... Scout tie-ups with theaters... notification of coming Disney one-reeler to 38,000 Scoutmasters... all this might well be called major league promotion... and on a short!"

== Voice cast ==
- Clarence Nash: Donald Duck, Huey, Dewey and Louie

== Releases ==
- 1938 - theatrical release
- 2012 - Have a Laugh! episode 59 (TV)
- 1956 - Disneyland, #2.18: "A Day in the Life of Donald Duck" (TV)
- 1961 - Walt Disney's Wonderful World of Color, #8.11: "Kids is Kids" (TV)
- 1965 - Donald Duck Goes West (theatrical)
- c. 1983 - Good Morning, Mickey!, episode #69 (TV)
- c. 1992 - Donald's Quack Attack, episode #61 (TV)
- 1997 - The Ink and Paint Club, episode #1.20: "Huey, Dewey and Louie" (TV)

== Home media ==
The short was released on May 18, 2004 on Walt Disney Treasures: The Chronological Donald, Volume One: 1934-1941.

Additional releases include:

- 1981 - "Kids is Kids Starring Donald Duck" (VHS)
- 2005 - "Classic Cartoon Favorites: Extreme Adventure Fun" (DVD)
- 2011 - iTunes (digital download)

== See also ==
- Good Scout Award
- Junior Woodchucks
