= Quack Pack =

1996 American animated sitcom television series

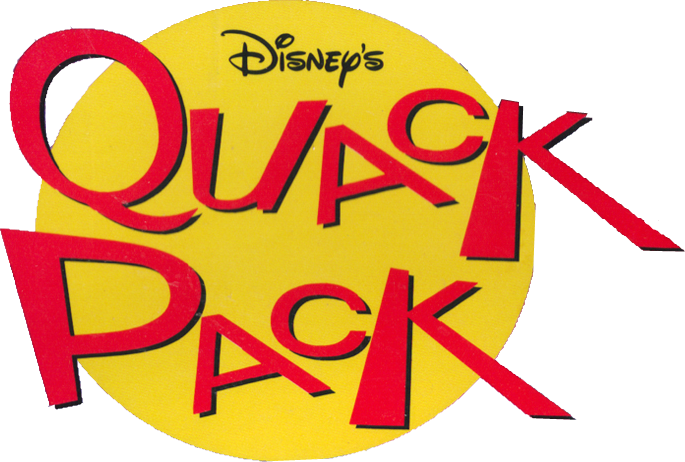
- Genre: Animated sitcom
- Created by: Toby Shelton; Kevin Hopps
- Based on: Donald Duck by Walt Disney; Dick Lundy
- Directed by: Kurt Anderson; Toby Shelton
- Voices of: Jeannie Elias; Pamela Adlon; E. G. Daily; Tony Anselmo; Kath Soucie; Roger Rose; Tim Curry; Corey Burton; Pat Fraley; Cam Clarke
- Theme music composer: Jeff Martin (arranged by Randy Petersen)
- Opening theme: "Quack Pack", performed by Eddie Money
- Ending theme: "Quack Pack" (Instrumental)
- Composer: Eric Schmidt
- Country of origin: United States
- Original language: English
- No. of seasons: 1
- No. of episodes: 39

Production
- Producers: Toby Shelton; Kevin Crosby Hopps
- Running time: 22 minutes
- Production company: Walt Disney Television Animation (Note: Animation outsourced to Moving Images International, Sunwoo Animation, Toon City, Toonz Animation, Walt Disney Animation Australia and Wang Film Productions.)

Original release
- Network: Syndication
- Release: September 3 – November 28, 1996

Quack Pack is an American animated sitcom produced by Walt Disney Television Animation, featuring Donald Duck and his nephews three Huey, Dewey, and Louie. The show debuted on September 3, 1996, as a part of the "Disney Afternoon" programming block, following the success of Goof Troop, and ran for one season with 39 episodes.

== Plot ==
The show centers around Donald Duck, who works as a cameraman alongside his girlfriend Daisy, a reporter for the TV news show What In the World. The pair travels around the world with his now-adolescent nephews Huey, Dewey, and Louie, looking for noteworthy news stories.

Huey, Dewey, and Louie have more distinct personalities than their younger selves had. They usually resort to extreme measures to achieve their ambitions without being punished by their uncle, often by tricking him only to feel guilty about it afterwards. The brothers share similar passions such as listening to rock music, getting revenge on those who anger them, impressing girls, getting money, pulling pranks, playing games and reading comics, as well as a profound knowledge of cars and mechanics.

== Characters ==
- Huey (voiced by Jeannie Elias), wearing red clothes, the oldest of Donald's nephews, usually acts as the leader of the three brothers and strongly believes that the concepts of fate and coincidence are somehow mysteriously linked together. This makes Huey possess a more persevering character than his brothers as he is usually the last to give up trying to get something when the trio want anything. Huey is also the lothario among the boys.
- Dewey (voiced by Pamela Adlon), wearing blue clothes, the middle child of the trio, is usually the most level-headed out of the three boys. Even though the trio love practical jokes, Dewey is the main practical joker and considers himself a master prankster due to his good knowledge of technology, such as using projectors to create ghosts and fog machines for a more spooky atmosphere.
- Louie (voiced by E. G. Daily), wearing green clothes, the youngest of the siblings, is a huge fan of comic books and sports – more so than his brothers, with his favorite comic book hero being Mantis Boy. Unlike his brothers, Louie is a nature and animal lover, in addition to being the kindest of his siblings.
- Donald Duck (voiced by Tony Anselmo) is the uncle/guardian of the trio, who refer to him as "Uncle D" if not "Uncle Donald". All of them live together in Donald's house. He is also Daisy's boyfriend and cameraman for her TV show. As with previous depictions of the character, despite being quick-tempered, easily annoyed, impatient, and an especially notorious prankster, he has a good heart and tries to be a decent and protective paternal figure to his "boys" Huey, Dewey and Louie, whom he deeply cares about, even if he is sometimes less than willing to trust them due to their mischievous nature.
- Daisy Duck (voiced by Kath Soucie) is Donald's girlfriend and the reporter of a TV show called What In the World, working for Kent Powers. She does everything she can to try to get a story, sometimes even to the extent of intentionally endangering others. She has a blue pet iguana named Knuckles who eats almost anything. Daisy is a mother figure to Huey, Dewey and Louie and is willing to trust them more than Donald does, as he usually believes they are up to no good, although he is often proven correct. She also puts up with Donald's equally dodgy and impulsive antics.
- Knuckles (voiced by Frank Welker) is Daisy's pet iguana. He was monster in Episode 2.
- Ludwig Von Drake (voiced by Corey Burton) is Donald's uncle and Duckburg's resident genius and inventor, whom Donald and his nephews visit when they need his advice or gadgets, though they tend to make matters worse for those involved.
- Gwumpki (voiced by Pat Fraley), an immigrant from a country called Gladismorkia, is a good friend of the quintet and owner of the local restaurant where the boys loiter in. He is generally kind-hearted, though he often gets angry when the topic of the boys' unpaid tab is brought up.

=== Villains ===
- Kent Powers (voiced by Roger Rose) is a narcissistic TV personality, and both Donald and Daisy's boss (as well as the latter's co-star). Although Donald is specifically employed as his cameraman, Kent makes Donald his personal assistant without paying him any extra and frequently bullies him for little more than a cheap laugh. Despite his popular image, he is egocentric, selfish, untrustworthy, aloof, domineering, mean-spirited, and prioritizes his career, personal endeavors and safety over everyone else, but unlike Donald has no redeeming qualities. Kent hates Donald, and eagerly seizes every opportunity to fire him or make his job more difficult.
- The Claw (voiced by Frank Welker) is an intimidating criminal named for the metal claw replacing his hand. The Claw first appears in "Ready, Aim... Duck!" when Donald claims that he was responsible for breaking the triplets' virtual reality helmet (in reality, Donald himself was the one who broke it). This causes The Claw to seek out Donald in anger. In his second appearance, "Long Arm of the Claw", the Claw reappears as a fully rehabilitated "good citizen". However, he relapses back into his violent nature whenever he sees gold and calms down only when he hears the sound of a ringing bell.
- Moltoc (voiced by Tim Curry) is a sneaky European villain who intends to take over the world by stealing a golden orb in "Recipe for Adventure" and finding a buried treasure in "Hit the Road, Backwater Jack".
- The Zalcrovian Overlord (ZO) is an alien overlord whose plans to take over Earth were accidentally foiled by Donald in "The Late Donald Duck"; thus, he returns in "The Return of the T-Squad" for revenge. Despite this, he greatly respects Donald as a worthy adversary, mistaking him as "Earth's Greatest Champion", unaware Donald stopped the invasion by accident.
- Dr. Horton Letrek (Jeff Bennett) is a mad scientist who in "Island of the Not So Nice" invented a ray that turns lifeforms into prehistoric versions of themselves and in "Heavy Dental" invented a mind-control device.

== Episodes ==
No.	Title	Directed by	Written by	Storyboarded by	Original release date
1	"The Really Mighty Ducks"	Toby Shelton; Terence Harrison and Kirk Tingblad (animation timing)	John Behnke, Rob Humphrey, & Jim Peterson	Carin-Anne Anderson and Kuni Bowen	September 3, 1996
Tired of being nagged at by Donald to clean their room, the boys seek the help of Ludwig Von Drake and find a machine that turns them into superheroes known as the Tremendously Talented Trio of Truly Trusted Trouble-Shooters or "The T-Squad": Brain Boy (Dewey), Captain Muscle (Louie), and Really Incredible Fast Guy (Huey) for short, thus deterring Donald from hassling them. But when Donald uses the machine himself and transforms into the supervillain "The Duck of Doom", things start to get out of hand.
2	"Island of the Not So Nice"	Kurt Anderson; Carole Beers, Bob Zamboni, and Kevin Petrilak (animation timing)	Dean Stefan	David Prince and Wendell Washer	September 4, 1996
The boys decide to take Daisy's pet iguana Knuckles for a walk, promising that nothing bad will happen. But when they get kidnapped by a mad scientist with a machine that can turn lifeforms back into their prehistoric ancestors, they find they might not be able to come through on that promise, but Knuckles comes with them and is accidentally turned into a Godzilla-like dinosaur monster that rampages though Duckburg.
3	"Leader of the Quack"	Kurt Anderson; Carole Beers & Bob Zamboni (animation timing)	Steve Cuden	Shawna Cha, Holly Forsyth, Jan Green, and Enrique May	September 5, 1996
The group go to a village still stuck in the Medieval period, where the people there hail Donald as their savior for defeating a dragon and make him their king. It seems glamorous at first, but Donald soon realize how heavy the crown really is.
4	"All Hands on Duck!"	Toby Shelton; Carole Beers & Bob Zamboni (animation timing)	John Behnke, Rob Humphrey, & Jim Peterson and Dean Stefan	Kurt Anderson, Hank Tucker, and Eddy Houchins	September 10, 1996
When Donald and Daisy go to do a report on a Naval vessel, it is revealed that Donald still owes them 24 hours of worktime, and his C.O. is content on giving him a hard time as comeuppance for all the times Donald has thrown him overboard.
5	"Pride Goeth Before the Fall Guy"	Toby Shelton; John Kimball & Rick Leon (animation timing)	Richard Stanley	Jill Colbert and Victor Cook	September 11, 1996
Donald hires a new, shady assistant. Meanwhile, the boys get a new pack of cards of infamous criminals and Donald's new assistant is among them.
6	"Need 4 Speed"	Toby Shelton; Mircea Mantta, Terence Harrison, and Marsh Lamore (animation timing)	Barry Vigon & Tom Walla	Wendell Washer and Ryan Anthony	September 12, 1996
When Donald has nightmarish visions of what will happen to his nephews if he lets them drive, he refuses to let them have a car. But when a champion racer insults Donald (and in front of Daisy no less) he promises the boys a car if they help him win the race. Only Donald isn't likely to give the boys exactly what they want.
7	"The Germinator"	Toby Shelton; Bob Zamboni, Woody Yocum, and Terence Harrison (animation timing)	Dean Stefan	Lonnie Lloyd and Wendell Washer	September 17, 1996
The group encounters a mad scientist who has devised a machine that can shrink things down to microscopic size and uses it to make Donald sick.
8	"The Late Donald Duck"	Kurt Anderson; Terence Harrison and Kirk Tingblad (animation timing)	Richard Stanley	Mark Kennedy and Victor Cook	September 18, 1996
Donald draws the ire of his boss Kent Powers when he shows up to work late. To try and keep his job, he writes a story, hoping he'll buy it.
9	"Tasty Paste"	Kurt Anderson; Marsh Lamore, Rick Leon, John Kimball, & Kevin Petrilak (animation timing)	Steve Roberts	Ryan Anthony, Craig Kemplin, Debra Pugh, Lenard Robinson, and Kirk Tingblad	September 19, 1996
The boys become the new CEOs of a company that sells an addictive new snack and become filthy rich. But they're so into their wealth that they forget that there are some things money can't buy.
10	"Phoniest Home Videos"	Kurt Anderson; Carole Beers, Bob Zamboni, and Kevin Petrilak (animation timing)	John Behnke, Rob Humphrey, & Jim Peterson and Richard Stanley	Warwick Gilbert	September 24, 1996
When Donald's videotaped foul-ups make him a big star on 'Wackiest Home Videos', he gets a swelled head and ignores Louie, Huey and Dewey. But when the show's producer pushes Donald into life-threatening stunts, it's up to the boys to save him.
11	"Return of the T-Squad"	Kurt Anderson; John Kimball, Woody Yocum, Marsh Lamore, & Bob Zamboni (animation timing)	Bill Motz & Bob Roth	Marty Warner, Craig Kemplin, and Victor Cook	September 25, 1996
When Donald is kidnapped by aliens who tried to dominate Earth but were foiled by Donald, Louie, Huey, and Dewey must once again don their capes and tights as the T-Squad to rescue him. But they soon learn that even the most daunting tasks can be solved without superpowers.
12	"Koi Story"	Kurt Anderson; Terence Harrison and Kirk Tingblad (animation timing)	Alicia Schudt	David Prince and Wendell Washer	September 26, 1996
The group encounters a stranger who keeps a rare, giant fish couped up in a huge bowl, content on keeping him happy. But he doesn't know that his pet isn't happy, nor does he realize what he wants.
13	"Ready, Aim... Duck!"	Kurt Anderson; Terence Harrison, Kirk Tingblad, and Kevin Petrilak (animation timing)	Cathryn Perdue	David Prince, Wendell Washer, and Craig Kemplin	October 1, 1996
After Donald trashes the house while playing the boys' Captain Jack virtual reality helmet, he makes up lies on the spot to hide the truth. Donald then has visions of Captain Jack ordering him to confess. But Donald ignores this and eventually draws the ire of a dangerous criminal known as "The Claw".
14	"Pardon My Molecules"	Toby Shelton; Terence Harrison, Mircea Mantta, and Woody Yocum (animation timing)	Dean Stefan	Jill Colbert and Sharon Forward	October 2, 1996
While on a trip to the desert, Huey and Dewey's game of race cars leads to a bitter argument. Meanwhile, Donald and Daisy head to a secret lab where they're kidnapped by a scientist who wants revenge on Daisy for ridiculing his painting years ago. But when Huey and Dewey are merged by one of the scientist's inventions, they must learn to work together to save their uncle and Daisy.
15	"Unusual Suspects"	Toby Shelton; Bob Zamboni, John Kimball, and Woody Yocum (animation timing)	Bill Motz & Bob Roth	Marty Warner, Holly Forsyth, Lonnie Lloyd, and Laurence Knighton	October 3, 1996
New neighbors move in next to Donald and his nephews and Donald decides to scope them out. But while they pretend to be normal, they hide a dark secret.
16	"Ducklaration of Independence"	Toby Shelton; Terence Harrison and Kirk Tingblad (animation timing)	Robert Schechter	Holly Forsyth, Enrique May, and Judie Martin	October 8, 1996
Dewey has become fed up with his brothers intruding on his space and decided to search for a hidden place they're currently looking for. But when he finds a hermit in it content on keeping to himself, he realizes he might not be able to cope with a life of solitude after all.
17	"Can't Take a Yolk"	Toby Shelton; Terence Harrison and Kirk Tingblad (animation timing)	Thomas Hart	Victor Cook, David Prince, Chris Rutkowski, and Wendell Washer	October 9, 1996
When Louie, Huey and Dewey get punished after playing a practical joke on their uncle, they order some retro-growth formula to shrink a tree to get out of the yard work Donald set them. However, Donald accidentally uses the formula on himself and it is slowly turning him younger and younger.
18	"Heavy Dental"	Kurt Anderson; Bob Zamboni, Carole Beers, Marsh Lamore, and Rick Leon (animation timing)	Douglas Langdale	Jill Colbert and Holly Forsyth	October 10, 1996
Huey wants to enter a cool teen contest, so wants to look his very best. But when he goes to the dentist to get his teeth whitened, he's outfitted with what he believes to be braces, but it is in reality a special mind-control device intended for someone else and the mastermind will stop at nothing to get it back.
19	"Duck Quake"	Toby Shelton; Bob Zamboni and Woody Yocum (animation timing)	Kevin Campbell	Jill Colbert, Lonnie Lloyd, and Marty Warner	October 15, 1996
The boys remember the horror of their terrible camping situation from last year. So they employ the help of Ludwig Von Drake and trick Donald into thinking there will be a huge earthquake in Duckburg, thus pressuring him to buy provisions that the boys intend to use on the next school camping trip. But when Donald catches wind of their true intentions, he uses the boys own earthquake device to get revenge on them.
20	"Long Arm of the Claw"	Kurt Anderson; Bob Zamboni, Woody Yocum, Terence Harrison, and Mircea Mantta (animation timing)	Bill Motz & Bob Roth	David Prince, Wendell Washer, and Michael Bennett	October 16, 1996
Donald cowers in fear when he hears that The Claw has been released from jail and is seeking revenge. To make things really intense, he and his mother move next door to him. The Claw, who has undergone rehabilitation, seems to have changed his ways. But his mother tells him that the process wasn't perfect and that he can still go back to his old criminal self.
21	"Shrunken Heroes"	Kurt Anderson; Terence Harrison and Kirk Tingblad (animation timing)	Marion Wells	Shawna Cha and Holly Forsyth	October 17, 1996
Louie is arrested after attempting to foil poachers' plot to sell endangered animals to tourists and Daisy tries to coax him out of taking the law into his own hands. Louie then meets his hero who tried the same stunt and after a microscopic adventure learns that law enforcement should be left to the pros.
22	"Snow Place to Hide"	Kurt Anderson; Carole Beers, Kirk Tingblad, Bob Zamboni, Terry Harrison, & Kevin Petrilak (animation timing)	Dean Stefan	Holly Forsyth, Llyn Hunter, and Enrique May	October 22, 1996
When Daisy goes on a ski trip with their boss Kent Powers, Donald becomes jealous of the whole thing and tails her to ensure her commitment to him, and is letting his greened-eyed monster of jealousy call all the shots.
23	"Huey Duck, P.I."	Kurt Anderson; Terence Harrison, Kirk Tingblad, and Kevin Petrilak (animation timing)	Jymn Magon and Steve Roberts	Wendell Washer, David Prince, and Kirk Tingblad	October 23, 1996
Huey becomes enticed by a TV show and passes himself off as a professional agent. But when he gets in the thick of things, he realizes that it's never as easy as television makes it.
24	"Take My Duck, Please"	Kurt Anderson; Bob Zamboni, Carole Beers, Woody Yocum (animation timing)	Marion Wells and Dean Stefan	Marty Warner, Craig Kemplin, and Michael Bennett	October 24, 1996
The boys are getting tired of having to work all the time and want to have fun. When they and Donald see a commercial for an exchange program to Switzerland they immediately agree it would be a great idea. Donald gets a prim and proper girl in exchange and the boys get to have fun. But when Donald finds out that she's not the sweet angel the ads make her and the boys encounter a slave driving alien disguised as their guardian, they start to doubt the switch.
25	"Ducks by Nature"	Kurt Anderson; Carole Beers, Mircea Mantta, Bob Zamboni, & Kevin Petrilak (animation timing)	John Behnke, Rob Humphrey, & Jim Peterson	Holly Forsyth, Denise Koyama, and Joe Horne	October 29, 1996
Fed up with the boys just sitting on the couch watching television, Donald takes them to a camp where they're reluctant at first, but soon find themselves competing for the affection of another fellow camper. Meanwhile, the counsellor, Beef Jerky, takes Donald for a weakling and Donald decides to join the trip to prove him wrong.
26	"Recipe for Adventure"	Toby Shelton; Dale Case and Marsh Lamore (animation timing)	Neil Kramer & Ned Teitelbaum	Phil Weinstein and Sharon Forward	October 30, 1996
The group goes with Gwumpki to his home country where he's to cook his special burgers for his queen. But when they arrive, a stranger tries to blackmail Gwumpki to cook his burgers so that he can get his hands on a powerful relic to control the world.
27	"The Boy Who Cried Ghost"	Kurt Anderson	Steve Cuden	David Prince and Wendell Washer	October 31, 1996
On their way to a Halloween party, Dewey's pranks go too far, leaving them stranded and forced to spend the night in a creepy mansion. But when it turns out to be really haunted, Dewey has a hard time convincing the others that it's not one of his practical jokes.
28	"I.O.U. a U.F.O."	Toby Shelton; Carole Beers, Bob Zamboni, and Terence Harrison (animation timing)	Cathryn Perdue	David Prince and Wendell Washer	November 5, 1996
The family travels out into the desert and Dewey claims to see a U.F.O., much to the disbelief of the others. But when he gets the help from one of the locals, Dewey's curiosity soon lands him in a heap of trouble.
29	"Gator Aid"	Kurt Anderson; Terence Harrison, Kirk Tingblad, & Bob Zamboni (animation timing)	Steve Roberts	Carin-Anne Anderson, Kuni Bowen, Craig Kemplin, and Enrique May	November 6, 1996
The group visit an alligator farm where they find that all the alligators have been wrangled with the exception of one female who develops a crush on Donald. Their hunt for the gators leads them to an operation to rob a gold depository.
30	"None Like It Hot"	Toby Shelton; Dale Case, Daniel de la Vega, and Marsh Lamore (animation timing)	Dean Stefan	Jill Colbert and Victor Cook	November 7, 1996
Louie's quest for the latest Mantis Boy comic leads him and his brothers to discover a madman's plot to submerge the earth in an intense heatwave.
31	"Ducky Dearest"	Kurt Anderson; Carole Beers, Bob Zamboni, and Kirk Tingblad (animation timing)	Laraine Arkow	David Prince, Wendell Washer, and Victor Cook	November 12, 1996
When a commercial on television leads Donald to doubt the integrity of his nephews, he gives in and buys a kit to try to become the perfect parent. Little does he know about the scam behind the commercial.
32	"Transmission: Impossible"	Toby Shelton	Jymn Magon	Warwick Gilbert and Don MacKinnon	November 13, 1996
When the boys destroy Donald's new ninja lumberjack tape, he loses trust in them and he and Daisy refuse to believe anything they say. But when a thief uses security cameras as portals to steal valuable artifacts, the pressure is on to convince them of the truth.
33	"Nosy Neighbors"	Kurt Anderson; Terence Harrison, Kirk Tingblad, and John Kimball (animation timing)	Robert Schechter	Holly Forsyth and Marty Warner	November 14, 1996
After a series of thefts in Donald's neighborhood, he joins the Nosy Neighbors neighborhood watch group and gets carried away with defending his home turf.
34	"Hit the Road, Backwater Jack"	Kurt Anderson; Terence Harrison, Kirk Tingblad, and Woody Yocum (animation timing)	Robert Schechter	Mark Kennedy and Warwick Gilbert	November 19, 1996
After the boys find a treasure map, they decide to follow it and bring Backwater Jack along so they can shoot his next adventure, only Jack's not the adventurer he makes himself out to be in his books.
35	"Cat & Louse"	Toby Shelton; John Kimball, Rick Leon, and Mitch Rochon (animation timing)	Marion Wells	Ryan Anthony and Debra Pugh	November 20, 1996
When the group interviews a cat and lion trainer, Huey's fear of house cats resurfaces. Louie and Dewey plan to discover how his fear first came about and learn it may be connected to the trainer. When the trainer discovers the group has found out he is not only training his cats to do harmless tricks, he sets out for revenge.
36	"Hero Today, Don Tomorrow"	Toby Shelton; Terence Harrison and Kirk Tingblad (animation timing)	Marion Wells and John Behnke, Rob Humphrey, & Jim Peterson	Jill Colbert and Holly Forsyth	November 21, 1996
The boys become enticed by an American Gladiator like star Flint Steel and Donald becomes jealous. To try and get the boys attention again, Donald tries to convince them that he knew Flint Steel from his youth.
37	"Captain Donald"	Kurt Anderson; John Kimball and Mircea Mantta (animation timing)	Cathryn Perdue	Jill Colbert, Holly Forsyth, and Michael Bennett	November 26, 1996
Kent Powers lets Donald become captain of his yacht on a cruise when they run into a hurricane and are stranded on an island where a sinister pirate befriends them so they can use them to find a legendary treasure.
38	"Stunt Double or Nothing"	Kurt Anderson; Carole Beers, Bob Zamboni, Marsh Lamore, Karen Peterson, & Kevin Petrilak (animation timing)	Marion Wells	Carin-Anne Anderson, Kuni Bowen, and Bradley Raymond	November 27, 1996
When a newspaper reveals that the viewers prefer Daisy over Kent Powers, he becomes enraged at the news and has trained a gorilla do all his stunts for him to increase his popularity. At the same time, he threatens to fire Donald and Daisy if any of his property gets damaged from their antics.
39	"Feats of Clay"	Kurt Anderson; Terence Harrison, Kirk Tingblad, and Woody Yocum (animation timing)	Don Gillies	Craig Kemplin and Marty Warner	November 28, 1996
While visiting China, Huey is seduced by a local girl who turns out to be an empress witch of world domination.

== Production ==
Co-producers Kevin Crosby Hopps and Toby Shelton turned to Donald Duck shorts for inspiration for Quack Pack. Shelton noted that in the shorts, Donald mostly interacted with humans, and decided to incorporate humans into the world of Quack Pack. This contrasted with DuckTales, a previous Disney Afternoon series, where the world is inhabited by other anthropomorphic animals. Shelton considers Quack Pack as more of an extension of the original Donald Duck shorts than of DuckTales. Because of this, many characters from the DuckTales cartoons and comics, including Disney characters, such as Scrooge McDuck, Launchpad McQuack, and Mickey Mouse don't appear in the series, although Ludwig Von Drake does make a couple of appearances.

In the show, the previously interchangeable nephews were given their own voices and personalities. Huey was the smooth-talker and schemer, Louie was the athlete and oddball, and Dewey was the intellectual and prankster.

The original title of the show was Duck Daze, but was changed to Quack Pack before release. There are still references to Duck Daze in the theme song.

== Release ==
After Quack Pack left the Disney Afternoon block and following the launch of Disney's One Saturday Morning on ABC, it eventually resurfaced in reruns on Disney Channel, and later on Toon Disney. The show was removed from the channel's line up along with several other Disney shows in November 2004.

This show was aired on Disney Junior in Turkey, Netherlands, Flanders, Japan, and Southern Africa, on Disney Channel in Germany, India, Mexico, Poland and Turkey, and Disney XD in Scandinavia and Latin America.

All episodes of the series are currently available on the Disney+ streaming service.

== Home media ==
=== VHS releases ===
In the summer of 1997, three 45-minute VHS cassettes containing six episodes were released in the United States.

VHS name	Episode titles	Release date
Alien Attack!	"I.O.U a U.F.O." "Ducklaration of Independence"	July 15, 1997
Ducks Amuck!	"Ducky Dearest" "All Hands on Duck"	July 15, 1997
House of Haunts	"The Boy Who Cried Ghost" "Cat and Louse"	August 26, 1997

=== DVD releases ===
==== United States ====
The episodes "Transmission: Impossible", "Heavy Dental" and "Feats of Clay" were released as the first Region 1 volume Quack Pack: Volume 1 in the United States on February 14, 2006.

==== International ====
A one-off Christmas special compilation DVD titled Disney's Christmas Favourites was released in Region 2 on October 31, 2005, and contains the Quack Pack episode "Snow Place to Hide", along with the Mickey Mouse Works short segment "Mickey's Mixed Nuts", the 101 Dalmatians: The Series episode "A Christmas Cruella", and the short Toy Tinkers.

== Reception ==
=== Critical reception ===
Zach Gass of Screen Rant called Quack Pack one of the "classic Disney cartoons," writing, "It's not the most original idea, but it's definitely an animated '90s time capsule. With its choice of design, dialogue, and certain plot devices, it's unarguably a product of its time, for better and for worse." Catherine Hug of CBR.com said, "While Quack Pack only had one season in 1996, it featured the hilarious antics of Donald Duck and his three nephews, Huey, Dewey, and Louie. While Donald tried working as a TV Cameraman, he also had to watch over his three rebellious nephews." Susana Polo of Polygon stated, "Quack Pack wasn’t all bad ideas. Like our modern DuckTales reboot, it seized upon the idea of giving Huey, Dewey and Louie differentiated personalities."

== Legacy ==
Quack Pack served as inspiration for the 2017 DuckTales episode of the same name, wherein the main characters find themselves trapped in a 1990s sitcom and are forced to contend with the human studio audience, which they view as monsters since humans are not part of the series. Additionally, in the series finale 'The Last Adventure!', it was revealed that Donald kept a Hawaiian shirt similar to the one he wears in Quack Pack, and Della, sarcastically, asked if the year was 1996, which was the year the series released.
