= Silversher & Silversher =

American songwriting team

Michael and Patty Silversher
- Occupations: Composers, songwriters
- Years active: 1970's-present

Michael Silversher and Patricia (Patty) Silversher, sometimes billed as Silversher & Silversher, are an American songwriting team known for writing themes and songs for Disney and Jim Henson television series, shows and specials, as well as direct-to-video animated films for Disney, Henson, Sony Wonder, MGM and Warner Bros. They participated on the Grammy Award-winning soundtrack album for the Sony-CTW film The Adventures of Elmo in Grouchland. They have also been nominated for three prime-time Emmy Awards for outstanding music and lyrics.

Together, they co-founded the South Bay Songwriters Association (SBSA) in 1979. It became the Northern California Songwriters Association (NCSA)in the mid-eighties and most recently West Coast Songwriters (WCS) and hold an annual songwriters conference, inviting songwriters, composers, lawyers, music publishers and other industry professionals to come together and share information, news on legislation and, above all, songs written by members during the previous year. 2024 is their 46th conference, and the first one in Southern California (in Pasadena).

Formerly married, Michael Silversher and Patty Silversher continue their collaboration in children's music. They scored the Jim Henson/PBS show Dinosaur Train, that began to air in September 2009. They created the scores for 95 of the 100 episodes now showing all over the world.

They have also created songs and all the scores for the Henson/Netflix co-production of "Word Party" since its inception in 2012. They wrote songs for "Sid The Science Kid" and they were the music supervisors, composers and lyricists for the Henson/Sprout production Pajanimals.

== Songs ==
Some of their work includes:

- Disney's Adventures of the Gummi Bears — "Gummi Bears Theme", "Gummiberry Juice", "Rough, Tough, Burly Sailor Song"
- TaleSpin — "Tale Spin Theme (Spin It!)", "I'm Gone", "Home Is Where the Heart Is", "Sky Pirates (I'm a Pirate)", "Monkey In Your Tank"
- Chip 'n Dale Rescue Rangers — "Fat Cat Stomp", "The Best of Everything", "You're the Best Bee for Me"
- DuckTales — "The Boogie Beagle Blues", "Bubba Duck Theme"
- Donald Duck's 50th Birthday (1984) — "Happy, Happy Birthday to You (Donald Duck version)" and "Can You Quack Like Donald Duck?"
- The Return of Jafar (1994) — "Forget About Love", "Nothing In the World"
- The Little Mermaid (TV series) — "In Harmony", "Dis is De Life", "The Edge of the Edge of the Sea", "Daring to Dance"
- The Little Mermaid II: Return to the Sea (2000) — "Down to the Sea", "For a Moment", "Tip and Dash", "Here on the Land and Sea"
- Boo to You Too! Winnie the Pooh (1996) — "I Am Not Afraid", "I Wanna Scare Myself" (Emmy nominated song)
- Winnie the Pooh: A Valentine for You (1999) — "Girls Are Like Boys", "When the Love Bug Bites", "Places in the Heart"
- "Together Forever" from The Adventures of Elmo in Grouchland (1999), Grammy-Award winner for Best Musical Album for Children
- Songs for Muppet Classic Theater (1994)
- Songs for Mr. Willowby's Christmas Tree (1995), Emmy nominee for the song "The Perfect Tree"
- Songs for Jim Henson's Animal Jam (2003)
- Songs and score for Pajanimals (2008–2013)
- Songs and score for Dinosaur Train (2009–2019)

Michael Silversher also has a songwriting credit on Raffi's 1994 album Bananaphone, for the song "The Changing Garden of Mr. Bell" which he wrote with singer/songwriter, Janice Hubbard and The Little Mermaid (TV series) for the song "The Lobster Mobster's Mob" which he composed the music for. He was founding musical director and resident songwriter for Robert Redford's Sundance Institute's Children's Theater and Sundance Institute's Playwrights' Lab from 1991 until 1996. He wrote and arranged most of the Mickey Mouse Splashdance album from Disneyland Records' WDL series. He has written operas for Los Angeles Opera and Kennedy Center in Washington, D.C., and a musical, The Lively Lad, shown at the Humana Festival of New American Plays. Michael was commissioned by The Kennedy Center to write the music for Knuffle Bunny: A Cautionary Musical, in collaboration with author Mo Willems, which premiered in 2010. Michael remarried in 2022 and resides in Ashland, Oregon. Michael and his new wife, Victoria Graham, sing with Ashland's own Rogue Valley Pease Choir, and the choir has two of Michael's songs in its repertoire, "Tikkun Olam (written with Pamela Freeman) and "A Simple Prayer," written a month after the attack of 9/11.<source: Michael Silversher> Michael and Patty have retained their partnership though the years, most recently writing the theme song for the live action YouTube series, "Bunny BE." Michael has been composing a new opera based on the book, "The Man Who Planted Trees" by Jean Giono, and created a song from three of the leitmotifs of that opera, "The Tree Song," which was commissioned by Ashland's concert production company, Anima Mundi, for their concert, "The Meaning of Love," celebrating love in all its aspects, from romantic love, spiritual love, love for humanity and love of nature. "The Tree Song" is a love song between the man who planted the tree and the tree itself. It premiered on February 18, 2024 at the SOU Recital Hall on the campus of Southern Oregon University.
