= Honey Harvester =

1949 Donald Duck cartoon

- Theatrical release poster
- Directed by: Jack Hannah
- Story by: Bill Berg; Nick George
- Produced by: Walt Disney
- Starring: Clarence Nash
- Music by: Oliver Wallace
- Animation by: Bob Carlson; Volus Jones; Dan MacManus; Judge Whitaker; Bill Justice
- Layouts by: Yale Gracey
- Backgrounds by: Thelma Witmer
- Production company: Walt Disney Productions
- Distributed by: RKO Radio Pictures, Inc.
- Release date: August 5, 1949
- Running time: 7 minutes
- Country: United States
- Language: English

Honey Harvester is a 1949 animated short film featuring Donald Duck. It was released by Walt Disney Productions.

== Plot ==
Donald Duck works in a greenhouse and notices a bee harvesting nectar. He undertakes a search to find the hive, which he finds in the radiator of his old car, he empties the hive of the honey and starts to leave. The bees however begin to attack Donald, a struggle ensues, and Donald returns the honey, except for one jar. This provokes the bees to mount another attack.

== Voice cast ==
- Clarence Nash as Donald Duck

== Home media ==
The short was released on December 11, 2007 on Walt Disney Treasures: The Chronological Donald, Volume Three: 1947-1950.
