= Soup's On =

1948 Donald Duck cartoon

- Poster
- Directed by: Jack Hannah
- Story by: Bill Berg; Milt Banta
- Produced by: Walt Disney
- Starring: Clarence Nash
- Music by: Oliver Wallace
- Animation by: Volus Jones; Bill Justice; Bob Carlson; Josh Meador
- Color process: Technicolor
- Production company: Walt Disney Productions
- Distributed by: RKO Radio Pictures
- Release date: October 15, 1948
- Running time: 6:53
- Country: United States
- Language: English

Soup's On is a 1948 Donald Duck animated short film directed by Jack Hannah, produced in Technicolor by Walt Disney Productions and released to theaters by RKO Radio Pictures.

In the short, Donald cooks a turkey dinner for his three nephews Huey, Dewey and Louie, but when they come to the table with dirty hands, he punishes them by sending them to bed. The nephews escalate the battle, and when Donald is knocked unconscious, they trick him into thinking that he has died and become an angel. While Donald's relationship with his nephews Huey, Dewey and Louie had deepened significantly by 1948 in Carl Barks' Duck comics, the nephews of the cartoons are still the identical mischievous troublemakers that they were when first introduced ten years earlier. The Encyclopedia of Walt Disney's Animated Characters spotlights this short as a particularly potent example of the nephews' malicious behavior:

Sometimes... Donald is the totally innocent victim of the Nephews' practical jokes. In Soup's On, one of the truly classic contests between the Duck and the kids, his only sin is to insist that they wash their filthy hands before sitting down to eat the great turkey feast that he has cooked for them all. Their response is as cooperative as you might expect... Huey, Dewey and Louie are indistinguishable: the three of them act with a single evil mind.

== Plot ==
Donald Duck is preparing a turkey dinner, while his three nephews play Apaches. When he calls his nephews in for dinner, they start fighting over the turkey. Donald orders the dirty ducks to take a bath, and they try to trick him by running the water, but Donald spots that Louie's hand is still dirty, and he sends them to their room. The ducks pretend to cry themselves to sleep, making Donald feel guilty. When he comes upstairs to tell them they're forgiven, they trick him into snapping his fingers on a mousetrap, and they grab the food and run.

Donald chases his nephews out the door, but as he rounds a curve, he falls off a cliff and narrowly misses being hit by a boulder, only to be knocked out by a small rock. When he regains consciousness, the nephews have dressed Donald up as an angel, and are pretending to be crying over his "squashed" body. He gives them a tearful goodbye, and they rush home to eat. When Donald tries to fly, he hits the ground and realizes that it was a joke.

When he gets home and finds his nephews feasting on the turkey, the "angel" Donald turns into a devil in a fit of rage, and chases them out of the house and across the countryside.

== Voice cast ==
- Clarence Nash as Donald Duck, Huey, Dewey, and Louie

== Music ==
As the cartoon begins, Donald sings a chorus of "Zip-a-Dee-Doo-Dah", a song from Disney's 1946 film Song of the South.

== Television ==
- Walt Disney's Wonderful World of Color, episode #8.11: "Kids is Kids"
- Good Morning, Mickey!, episode #32
- Mickey's Mouse Tracks, episode #64
- Donald's Quack Attack, episode #69
- The Ink and Paint Club, episode #1.51: "Triple Trouble"

== Home media ==
The short was released on December 11, 2007 on Walt Disney Treasures: The Chronological Donald, Volume Three: 1947-1950.

Additional release include:

- Kids is Kids Starring Donald Duck (VHS)
- Huey, Dewey and Louie's Greatest Hits (VHS)
- Walt Disney's Funny Factory, Vol. 4: Huey, Dewey, and Louie (DVD)
