= The Volunteer Worker =

1940 Donald Duck cartoon

- Directed by: Riley Thomson
- Story by: Larry Sharpsteen
- Produced by: Walt Disney
- Starring: Clarence Nash
- Music by: Larry Sharpsteen
- Color process: Technicolor
- Production company: Walt Disney Productions
- Distributed by: Community Chests of America
- Release date: September 1, 1940
- Running time: 3 minutes
- Country: United States
- Language: English

The Volunteer Worker is a 1940 American commercial Donald Duck short film directed by Riley Thomson and produced by Walt Disney for the Community Chests of America.

== Plot ==
Donald Duck is collecting for charity, but everyone refuses to donate. Saddened by his failure he sits on a sidewalk next to a worker and tells him his troubles. The worker tells Donald that he was helped by charity once, and although he can't give too much, he still wants to donate. Donald is excited by the donation and gives the worker a "I Gave" button, which the worker proudly displays.

== Voice cast ==
- Clarence Nash as Donald Duck / Butch the Bulldog
- Charles Judels as the Sidewalk Worker

== Home media ==
The short was released on May 18, 2004, on Walt Disney Treasures: The Chronological Donald, Volume One: 1934-1941.
