= Donald's Nephews =

1938 Donald Duck cartoon

- Theatrical poster
- Directed by: Jack King
- Story by: Carl Barks; Jack Hannah
- Produced by: Walt Disney
- Starring: Clarence Nash
- Music by: Oliver Wallace
- Color process: Technicolor
- Production company: Walt Disney Productions
- Distributed by: RKO Radio Pictures
- Release date: April 15, 1938; (USA)
- Running time: 8 minutes
- Country: United States
- Language: English

Donald's Nephews is a 1938 Donald Duck animated cartoon which features Donald being visited by his three nephews, Huey, Dewey, and Louie. This cartoon is Huey, Dewey, and Louie's first appearance in animation. Al Taliaferro, the artist for the Silly Symphony comic strip, proposed the idea for the film, so that the studio would have duck counterparts to Morty and Ferdie Fieldmouse, the nephews of Mickey Mouse. The Walt Disney Productions Story Dept. on February 5, 1937, sent Taliaferro a memo recognizing him as the source of the idea for the planned short.

The memo indicated, "we have decided to actually put a story crew to work on Donald's Nephews". With the short already in production more than eight months before the boys' Donald Duck comic strip debut (on October 17, 1937), the animation studio's model sheet and storyline would have been Taliaferro and writer Ted Osborne's frame of reference for the comic strip. Because the strip was an adaptation of the animated shorts, it could utilize ideas from films still in production (DuckTales reversed this, being a TV adaptation of the comics). Similarly, Barks' Junior Woodchuck prototype, Good Scouts, was released three months after identical scouting uniforms were introduced by Taliaferro and Bob Karp in the comic strip.

The nephews being triplets who finished each other's sentences was developed by Carl Barks, the screenwriter/storyboard artist of the film, for whom Happy Hooligan, a comic strip that featured such triplets, was a childhood influence. This characteristic appeared for the first time at the end of the film. The nephews' names were devised by Disney gag man Dana Coty, who took them from Huey Long, Thomas Dewey, and Louis Schmitt, a Disney Studio animator.

== Plot ==
Donald receives a postcard from his sister, Dumbella, which says that her three boys, Huey, Dewey, and Louie, are coming to visit him. At first, Donald is excited to see his nephews, but soon the boys start causing trouble.

Consulting a book called Modern Child Training, Donald tries to use the suggestions to gain control over his nephews, but things only get worse. In the end, after the boys leave and with his house left almost destroyed, Donald finds out that the sentence "After all, little children are only angels without wings" is "Aw Phooey!!" and tears up the book in an explosive rage.

== Voice cast ==
- Clarence Nash: Donald Duck, Huey, Dewey and Louie

== Home media ==
The short was released on May 18, 2004, on Walt Disney Treasures: The Chronological Donald, Volume One: 1934-1941. It was also released on Walt Disney's Funny Factory With Huey Dewey & Louie Vol. 4. It was released to Disney+ on August 11, 2023.
