= Lucky Number (film) =

1951 Donald Duck cartoon

- Theatrical release poster
- Directed by: Jack Hannah
- Written by: Nick George; Bill Berg
- Produced by: Walt Disney
- Starring: Clarence Nash
- Music by: Paul Smith
- Animation by: Bill Justice; Bob Carlson; Volus Jones; George Kriesl; Blaine Gibson (effects)
- Layouts by: Yale Gracey
- Backgrounds by: Thelma Witmer
- Color process: Technicolor
- Production company: Walt Disney Productions
- Distributed by: RKO Radio Pictures
- Release date: July 20, 1951
- Running time: 6:30
- Country: United States
- Language: English

Lucky Number is a 1951 Donald Duck cartoon featuring Donald Duck and his three nephews Huey, Dewey, and Louie.

== Plot ==
Donald Duck owns and runs a Filling station. His three nephews Huey, Dewey, and Louie (aged to teenagers in this short) are busy working on their car when a radio station announces the winning numbers of a lottery for a new Zoom V-8 car. Frustrated that his ticket is not a winner, Donald leaves the garage. Immediately thereafter, however, the radio announcer corrects an error, resulting in Donald's ticket indeed having the winning numbers. Instead of telling the news to their uncle, the trio decide to pick up the car to surprise him.

The nephews do not make it far as their car is out of gas, and they push it back to Donald's station. Upon seeing they have no money, Donald pushes their car away. The boys use a cutout of a Zoom V-8 from a nearby billboard to disguise their car, and one of the boys dresses up as a comely woman, tricking Donald into fueling up their car. When he realized what happened, Donald is enraged. The trio rush to the radio station to pick up the car, and the station calls Donald about his nephews having a surprise for him. Upon returning to the gas station, a still angry Donald believes the car the boys are in is another trick, and proceeds to destroy it. The radio announcer then congratulates Donald by name, making him realize in horror what he has foolishly done.

== Voice cast ==
- Clarence Nash as Donald Duck, Huey, Dewey and Louie

== Home media ==
The short was released on November 11, 2008, on Walt Disney Treasures: The Chronological Donald, Volume Four: 1951-1961.
