= Truant Officer Donald =

1941 Donald Duck cartoon

- Theatrical release poster
- Directed by: Jack King
- Story by: Carl Barks; Jack Hannah
- Produced by: Walt Disney
- Starring: Clarence Nash
- Animation by: Paul Allen; Jim Armstrong; Ed Love; Ray Patterson; Andy Engman; Art Fitzpatrick
- Color process: Technicolor
- Production company: Walt Disney Productions
- Distributed by: RKO Radio Pictures
- Release date: August 1, 1941; (USA)
- Running time: 7:31
- Country: United States
- Language: English

Truant Officer Donald is an animated short film produced in Technicolor by Walt Disney Productions and released to theaters on August 1, 1941 by RKO Radio Pictures. The film was nominated for an Academy Award for Best Animated Short Film in 1942 but lost to another Disney cartoon, Lend a Paw. The story features Donald Duck working as a truant officer and making sure that his three nephews Huey, Dewey, and Louie go to school. The film was directed by Jack King while Clarence Nash provided the voices of Donald and the nephews.

== Plot ==
Huey, Dewey, and Louie are enjoying a swim in the lake, but they are being watched by Truant Officer Donald Duck, as he believes that they are skipping school to have fun in the lake.

He captures the nephews and drives them to the schoolhouse in his truant officer van. While he endlessly goes on about the importance of a good education, the boys pull out their pocket knives, managing to cut themselves out of the van and make a run for it. Donald notices the back of his van is gone, and he chases the boys to their clubhouse.

Donald tries numerous ways to get in, but each attempt fails miserably. In one attempt, he jacks up the clubhouse to load onto his van, but the boys manage to reverse the jack, so it comes back down on top of Donald. He tunnels out and decides as a last resort to smoke the boys out. Meanwhile, inside the clubhouse, the boys are cooking three chickens over the fire when suddenly they notice smoke pouring in. They decide to beat Donald at his own game by putting the chickens in the bed and escape through the roof. Donald peeks inside to see if his ploy had worked, and is horrified to see the chickens in the bed. Donald is very beside himself as he thinks he cooked the nephews alive. Then, Huey disguises himself as an angel and is lowered into the clubhouse. He manages to kick Donald in the rear. The second one causes him to fall, and his disguise falls off. Realizing that he has been tricked, Donald angrily beats up the trio and takes them to school.

In a twist ending, as soon as they reach school, Donald is shocked when he sees a sign that says "NOTICE SCHOOL CLOSED FOR SUMMER HOLIDAYS"; he realizes his nephews weren't playing hooky like he thought, and his intention of bringing his nephews back to school was all for nothing. As such, the nephews give Donald an infuriated glare for what he has done to them, causing Donald to literally deflate himself to a shrunken, extremely small size from his embarrassment over his mistake.

== Reception ==
The cartoon was nominated for an Academy Award in 1942, but lost to another Disney cartoon, Lend a Paw starring Mickey Mouse and featuring Pluto.

== Home media ==
The short was released on May 18, 2004 on Walt Disney Treasures: The Chronological Donald, Volume One: 1934-1941.
