= Put-Put Troubles =

1940 Donald Duck cartoon

- Theatrical release poster
- Directed by: Riley Thomson
- Story by: Carl Barks
- Produced by: Walt Disney
- Starring: Clarence Nash; Lee Millar
- Color process: Technicolor
- Production company: Walt Disney Productions
- Distributed by: RKO Radio Pictures
- Release date: July 19, 1940
- Country: United States
- Language: English

Put-Put Troubles is a 1940 American Donald Duck short film directed by Riley Thomson and produced by Walt Disney.

== Plot ==
Donald is in his motorboat with Pluto towing it. Pluto gets distracted by a frog, and loses control of the boat. During the cartoon then, Donald struggles with the outboard motor causing chaos to rein, while Pluto fights with a discarded spring in which he is trapped.

== Voice cast ==
- Clarence Nash as Donald Duck
- Lee Millar as Pluto

== Home media ==
The short was released on May 18, 2004, on Walt Disney Treasures: The Chronological Donald, Volume One: 1934-1941.
