= Donald Duck and the Gorilla =

1944 Donald Duck cartoon

- Theatrical release poster
- Directed by: Jack King
- Story by: Carl Barks; Bill Berg; Nick George; Jack Hannah; Jesse Marsh; Frank Tashlin; Roy Williams; Bill de la Torre
- Produced by: Walt Disney
- Starring: Clarence Nash; James MacDonald
- Music by: Oliver Wallace
- Animation by: Paul Allen; Jack King; Joshua Meador; George Nicholas; Charles A. Nichols; Judge Whitaker; Marvin Woodward
- Layouts by: Bill Herwig
- Backgrounds by: Maurice Greenberg
- Color process: Technicolor
- Production company: Walt Disney Productions
- Distributed by: RKO Radio Pictures
- Release date: March 31, 1944
- Running time: 7 minutes
- Country: United States
- Language: English

Donald Duck and the Gorilla is a Donald Duck short comedy monster film which was originally released in 1944. It stars Donald Duck along with his three nephews; Huey, Dewey and Louie and Ajax, the killer gorilla. The 1930 Mickey Mouse cartoon The Gorilla Mystery has a similar plot involving a gorilla named Beppo who captures Minnie Mouse.

== Plot ==
On a stormy night, Donald and his three nephews hear a radio reporter at Breckenridge announce that a fierce gorilla named Ajax has escaped from the city zoo. Donald frightens his nephews with gorilla hands. The nephews peer through a keyhole to see their uncle laughing and wearing the gloves. Vowing revenge, the triplets dress up in a gorilla suit and sneak up on Donald as he reads, taking a bite of his lollipop. After hearing the crunch noise, Donald discovers the gorilla's teeth markings on his lollipop and runs away in fright when he looks up into the gorilla suit's eyes.

At the same time, the real Ajax appears in a front window, breaks into the house and roars at the nephews who flee. Donald, now aware that the nephews tricked him, chases them in anger, running right into Ajax. Assuming that the gorilla is the nephews in disguise, Donald yanks on Ajax's face but then noticed that there are two of them, much to his shock. Donald opens Ajax's mouth and calls for the nephews, only to hear his echo before Ajax roars at him. The radio announcer advises listeners to look at animals straight in the eye. Taking the advice, Donald stares into the gorilla's eye where he sees a tombstone destined for him. Realizing that this is the real gorilla, Donald shoves an umbrella into Ajax's mouth and opens it as he was about to bite Donald before running away.

Donald and his nephews tiptoe through the house, but the nephews first spill melted candle wax on his tail before accidentally burning his butt. Boiling with rage, Donald sends the triplets away but burns his hand on the superheated doorknob after placing the candle right under it. Donald crosses paths with Ajax, who is swinging from rafts. After a stare-down and at the urging of his tail, Donald runs away and hides behind a door. Ajax tries to open the door with Donald pulling it back, causing part of it to rip with Donald still holding onto the knob. Ajax looks through the big hole with Donald's outline and as he puts the broken off part back, it falls, causing Donald to be seen and beginning a chase. Donald briefly tricks Ajax up a ladder, making him crash through several ceilings and end up in the attic. Ajax resumes the chase with Donald using the ladder as stilts.

Ajax swipes the stilts from Donald, causing Donald to slide down the dining room table and the two meet at the edge. Donald tries to run away but causes damage to the table and the wooden boards to fly into Ajax's hands and falls between two halves. Ajax slides the smaller half to flatten Donald and tries to bite his tail off, only for it to poke Ajax in the eyes. Upon the radio's advice, the nephews use tear gas to subdue Ajax, who begins to cry. Donald laughs triumphantly but then breathes in the tear gas too. The two close the cartoon consoling each other.

== Voice cast ==
- Clarence Nash as Donald Duck, Huey, Dewey and Louie
- James MacDonald as Ajax the Gorilla

== Home media ==
The short was released on December 6, 2005 on Walt Disney Treasures: The Chronological Donald, Volume Two: 1942-1946.

Additional releases include:

VHS

- Cartoon Classics: First Series: Volume 3: Scary Tales
- Disney's Halloween Treat
- Cartoon Classics: Second Series: Volume 13: Donald's Scary Tales

Laserdisc

- Cartoon Classics: Scary Tales
- Donald's Scary Tales
- Halloween Haunts

VCD

- Cartoon Classics: Birdbrain Donald (Malaysian release)

Television

- The Ink and Paint Club, episode 34: "Donald's Nephews"

== In other media ==
The short is part of the stories that the characters see during the plot of the 2001 direct-to-video film Mickey's House of Villains.

== See also ==
- List of World War II short films
