= Old MacDonald Duck =

1941 Donald Duck cartoon

- Theatrical release poster
- Directed by: Jack King
- Story by: Jack Hannah; Carl Barks
- Produced by: Walt Disney
- Starring: Clarence Nash
- Music by: Leigh Harline
- Color process: Technicolor
- Production company: Walt Disney Productions
- Distributed by: RKO Radio Pictures
- Release date: September 12, 1941
- Running time: 8 minutes
- Country: United States
- Language: English

Old MacDonald Duck is an animated cartoon by Walt Disney Productions from 1941, featuring Donald Duck.

== Plot ==
Donald Duck works as a farmer on a farm. He is first seen feeding the animals whilst singing "Old MacDonald Had a Farm". After finishing his song, Donald then goes to look for Clementine the cow to milk. He soon finds her up in the tree eating leaves from a branch and Donald calls Clementine to come down and says good morning to her. Donald puts the bucket under Clementine's udder and prepares to milk her. As Donald was milking Clementine, a fly arrives where it lands on Clementine's nose whom she snorts it off and spooking her which she smacks Donald with her tail. The fly then lands on Donald's nose and buzzes around his head. Donald tries to hit the fly but hits himself instead. The fly buzzes faster and faster around Donald's face making him dizzy but he hides under his hat. As he looks around to see if the fly has gone, Donald continues to milk Clementine but the fly lands on his hat and notices the two holes which he crawls in which causes Donald to go crazy and chases the fly around trying to hit it again but the fly lands on the fence. Donald returns to milk Clementine again but he doesn't notice he had accidentally milked his hat instead of the bucket. He realises he had got mixed up and swaps the hat for the bucket. As Donald puts his hat back on, he gets covered in milk, much to the fly's amusement. Annoyed, Donald squirts the fly away using milk from Clementine's udder, but the fly escapes into a jug. Donald uses a super squirt and the milk hits the jug the fly is in and laughs. Soaked, the fly takes his revenge on Clementine and Donald causing trouble and making Clementine lifting Donald up with her tail and swipes him around trying to get the fly, but the fly leads her into swinging Donald in his milking bucket. With Donald Squawking angrily inside the bucket, the fly bites Clementine on her back leg, causing her to kick Donald into the air and ends up crashing into the stable getting covered in equipments (with Donald getting a horse feed sack around his face in the process) much to his anger and snorts like a pig. The fly laughs yet again as the cartoon comes to a close.

== Voice cast ==
- Donald Duck: Clarence Nash

== Music ==
The cartoon takes its title from the children's song "Old MacDonald Had a Farm" that Donald sings while feeding his animals. Later on, while milking Clementine, Donald sings also the American folk ballad "Oh My Darling, Clementine".

In addition, "Turkey in the Straw" is used as background music, as in Steamboat Willie and The Band Concert.

== Legacy ==
Frames from this short have been shown and reused to describe how animation works. This clip is first seen in The Reluctant Dragon with Robert Benchley, later in Donald Duck's 50th Birthday to Dick Van Dyke, and a later special with Tony Anselmo and Neil Patrick Harris.

== Home media ==
The short was released on May 18, 2004, on Walt Disney Treasures: The Chronological Donald, Volume One: 1934-1941. It was released to Disney+ on October 6, 2023.
