= Lion Around =

1950 Donald Duck cartoon

- Theatrical release poster
- Directed by: Jack Hannah
- Written by: Bill Berg; Nick George
- Produced by: Walt Disney
- Starring: Clarence Nash; James MacDonald
- Music by: Oliver Wallace
- Animation by: Bob Carlson; Volus Jones; Bill Justice; Judge Whitaker; George Rowley (effects)
- Layouts by: Yale Gracey
- Backgrounds by: Thelma Witmer
- Color process: Technicolor
- Production company: Walt Disney Productions
- Distributed by: RKO Pictures
- Release date: January 20, 1950
- Running time: 6:40
- Country: United States
- Language: English

Lion Around is a 1950 Donald Duck cartoon featuring Donald Duck, his nephews Huey, Dewey, and Louie and Louie the Mountain Lion. The film is the first appearance of Louie the Mountain Lion. In this short, Donald is tricked into thinking he is getting attacked by a cougar.

== Plot ==
The cartoon opens with what appears to be one of Donald's three nephews hunting a mountain lion in the forest, which turns out to be the three of them playing and practicing: one is hunting the other two, who are acting in a lion suit. Upon finding Donald's house, they notice that he is baking a pie and decide to use their lion suit to distract him so they can get the pie for themselves. One of the nephews then comes to Donald's house screaming, telling him there is a mountain lion outside. Donald rushes out with his gun but is chased away from the cottage by the two in the lion suit while the other obtains the pie. The disguised nephews follow Donald up a tree, but their disguise gets blown. One of them tries to convince Donald that this was merely a joke, but Donald scolds the nephews and gets his pie back. After telling them to stay out, he goes back to his home to continue baking.

While the nephews are lamenting over their failure to accomplish their goal, Louie the Mountain Lion comes along and scares them away. He then turns his attention to Donald, who he views as an easy, tasty meal. He pounces on him, but Donald, thinking it is another trick by the nephews, repeatedly slaps Louie across the face, spanks him on the bottom with his tail, threatens to tear him apart if he saw (them) again and storms back into the house with his pie. Angry and humiliated, Louie tries to attack him from behind but Donald slams the door in front of him. Louie looks all around for him through the windows of the cottage until he then becomes interested in the pie and eats slice of it before Donald intervenes. Louie then bursts into the house and smashes the door on Donald in retaliation, destroying his pie in the process. Still thinking that Louie is the nephews in disguise, he pulls at the mountain lion's head to try and pull it off. When the nephews show up and show him their lion suit to show it's not them, Donald tells them to shut up and continues pulling at Louie's head and yelling to give. But he soon realizes his mistake when he does a double take and notices the nephews and lion suit are outside and that Louie is a real lion.

Donald tries to apologize to the mountain lion, but Louie is beyond forgiving and gives a loud roar, whose sound waves knock Donald through a door into his hunting trophy room. Donald tries to fool him by posing as a decoy duck, but Louie sees past this. After a wild chase around the house, Louie chases him through the chimney, up to the roof, and into a tree and claws away all the leaves trying to reach Donald. The nephews then give Donald a number of baked pies, which he gives to Louie, who decides not to eat Donald.

== Voice cast ==
- Clarence Nash as Donald Duck, Huey, Dewie, Louie
- James MacDonald as Louie the Mountain Lion

== Home media ==
The short was released on December 11, 2007, on Walt Disney Treasures: The Chronological Donald, Volume Three: 1947-1950.
