= Fire Chief (film) =

1940 Donald Duck cartoon

- Theatrical release poster
- Directed by: Jack King
- Story by: Carl Barks; Jack Hannah
- Produced by: Walt Disney
- Starring: Clarence Nash
- Music by: Paul J. Smith
- Animation by: Ed Love; Bob Carlson; Jack Bradbury
- Color process: Technicolor
- Production company: Walt Disney Productions
- Distributed by: RKO Radio Pictures
- Release date: December 13, 1940
- Running time: 7 minutes
- Country: United States
- Language: English

Fire Chief is a 1940 Disney cartoon starring Donald Duck and his three nephews Huey, Dewey, and Louie.

== Plot ==
The cartoon shows Donald living as a firefighter along with his three nephews. When the nephews get tired of Donald's snoring, they sound the fire alarm to wake him up, but Donald instead thinks that there is a fire so he rushes to get on the fire truck. He then comes back up to blow the horn to wake them up. Donald and his nephews march like soldiers, but Donald falls backwards, causing Huey to hit the other nephews, and they fall on Donald, which sounds like the NBC Chimes.

Later, Huey puts coal in the fire truck but Donald puts the entire bucket of coal in the firetruck, causing the house to catch fire. They then try to put out the fire but Donald instead unknowingly puts the hose on the truck's gasoline tank. One of the nephews notices and tries to warn him, but Donald pays no heed. As a result, he causes the fire house and the fire truck to burn down completely and, to add insult to injury, Donald's hat burns down as well, resulting in its burnt frames and becoming Donald's 'hair'. Defeated, Donald looks at the camera and says to the audience "You can't win. You just can't win."

== Voice cast ==
- Clarence Nash as Donald Duck and Huey, Dewey, and Louie

== Reception ==
The Film Daily called the short "fairly funny".

== Home media ==
The short was released on May 18, 2004, on Walt Disney Treasures: The Chronological Donald, Volume One: 1934-1941.
