= Don's Fountain of Youth =

1953 Donald Duck cartoon

- Theatrical release poster
- Directed by: Jack Hannah
- Story by: Ralph Wright
- Produced by: Walt Disney
- Starring: Clarence Nash
- Music by: Joseph Dubin
- Animation by: Volus Jones; Bill Justice; George Kreisl; George Rowley (effects)
- Layouts by: Yale Gracey
- Backgrounds by: Art Riley
- Color process: Technicolor
- Production company: Walt Disney Productions
- Distributed by: RKO Radio Pictures
- Release date: May 30, 1953
- Running time: 6:20
- Country: United States
- Language: English

Don's Fountain of Youth is a 1953 American animated short film by Walt Disney Productions featuring Donald Duck.

== Plot ==
Huey, Dewey and Louie think their uncle really has turned younger from the Fountain of Youth.

Donald and his three nephews are in Donald's car on US Highway 1 on vacation in Florida, and pass by an "old Spanish fort". The nephews, however, are more interested in their comic book, refusing to look up from it. When he tries taking away the comic book, the boys throw a huge temper tantrum which forces Donald to return it to them.

Donald's car begins to overheat, which sends him scrambling to find a source of water for his radiator. He comes across a small pond with a sign reading "This spring was mistaken for the Fountain Of Youth by Ponce de León". Donald decides to use this to trick the boys, with the intent of making them believe Donald is experiencing dramatic reverse aging.

Donald breaks off the top half of the sign, leaving only the bottom portion reading "The Fountain of Youth", and yells for help to get the boys' attention. The boys find Donald wearing a baby bonnet and exhibiting baby-like behavior, including tearing pages from their comic book. "Baby" Donald's outlandish behavior causes the boys to decide that some discipline is called for, and the boys go off to find a tree branch to use as a switch. However, Donald uses this time to steal an egg from a nearby sleeping American crocodile, place it where he had just been standing, and put his baby bonnet on it to fool the boys into thinking he has further regressed to an egg.

Donald watches from a nearby hiding spot alongside the very crocodile he stole the egg from (who had just woken up from Donald sitting on her). As the boys lament losing their Uncle to the reverse aging process, Donald attempts to share a laugh with the crocodile, who soon discovers that her egg is missing and Donald is the culprit. Enraged, the crocodile whacks Donald on the head with her tail and a dazed Donald sits on her egg. She then chases the triplets for the egg and they throw it to coincidentally where Donald is.

As Donald gets out of his daze from having the egg bounce off him, the two crocodile eggs hatch, imprinting the baby crocodiles into thinking Donald is in fact their father. After further time spent evading the crocodile, Donald suffers a concussion that puts him into a stupor, after which the boys see him stumbling.

Reuniting with the triplets, the baby crocodiles come up to Donald excitedly, so Donald and the kids run to the car and make a hasty exit. The babies begin to cry from Donald getting away. The crocodile is reunited with her babies, but due to their earlier imprinting onto Donald, they are terrified at the sight of their biological mother. The crocodile quacks, which causes her babies to accept her after all.

== Voice cast ==
- Clarence Nash as Donald Duck, Huey, Dewey and Louie

== Releases ==
- 1953 - theatrical release
- 1954 - Disneyland, episode #1.4: "The Donald Duck Story" (TV)
- 1961 - Walt Disney's Wonderful World of Color, episode #8.11: "Kids Is Kids" (TV)
- 1972 - The Mouse Factory, episode #2.1: "Alligators" (TV)
- 1978 - Donald Duck's Cartoon Mania (theatrical)
- c. 1983 - Good Morning, Mickey!, episode #68 (TV)
- 1990 - The Magical World of Disney: "Donald, the Star-Studded Duck" (TV)
- c. 1992 - Mickey's Mouse Tracks, episode #63 (TV)
- c. 1992 - Donald's Quack Attack, episode #51 (TV)
- 1998 - The Ink and Paint Club, episode #1.34: Donald's Nephews (TV)

== Home media ==
The short was released on November 11, 2008 on Walt Disney Treasures: The Chronological Donald, Volume Four: 1951-1961.

Additional releases include:

- 2000 - bonus on Gold Collection DVD release of The Three Caballeros (DVD).
- 2006 - Walt Disney's Funny Factory, Vol. 4: Huey Dewey & Louie Vol. 4
