= A Day in the Life of Donald Duck =

- Disneyland episode
- Episode no.: Season 2 Episode 18
- Original air date: February 1, 1956

Episode chronology
← Previous "A Tribute to Joel Chandler Harris"	Next → "Survival in Nature"

"A Day in the Life of Donald Duck" is a 1956 episode of the Disneyland TV show. As the name of the episode implies, viewers experience Donald Duck himself as he struggles through a typical day at the Walt Disney Studios. In the process, he meets up with Jimmie Dodd, Roy Williams, the Mouseketeers and even his own voice, Clarence Nash. This episode introduces a song about Donald, "Quack, Quack, Quack, Donald Duck."

== Home media ==
The film was released on December 6, 2005, on Walt Disney Treasures: The Chronological Donald, Volume Two: 1942-1946.
