= Straight Shooters =

1947 Donald Duck cartoon

- Theatrical release poster
- Directed by: Jack Hannah
- Story by: MacDonald MacPherson; Jack Huber
- Produced by: Walt Disney
- Starring: Clarence Nash
- Music by: Oliver Wallace
- Animation by: William Justice; Judge Whitaker; Volus Jones; Fred Jones
- Layouts by: Yale Gracey
- Backgrounds by: Thelma Witmer
- Color process: Technicolor
- Production company: Walt Disney Productions
- Distributed by: RKO Radio Pictures
- Release date: April 18, 1947
- Running time: 6:21
- Country: United States
- Language: English

Straight Shooters is a 1947 American animated short film directed by Jack Hannah and produced by Walt Disney, featuring Donald Duck.

== Plot ==
Donald Duck runs a shooting gallery at the local carnival. His three nephews come by wearing military cadet uniforms, and Donald insists they play. Huey shows remarkable skill in hitting every target, but when it comes time for his prize, Donald reaches past the large displayed candy boxes to hand Huey a tiny hidden box. Donald insists Huey repeat the performance, but reaches under the counter to hand him a gimmicked gun. With the gimmicked gun, all of Huey's shots miss.

Donald insists Huey try yet again, but this time hands him an empty gun. Donald prepares to make Huey think he is actually hitting targets with the empty gun by creating a glass breaking sound with extra light bulbs, but is shocked when the target actually breaks. Donald moves to the back of the game to find Louie positioned with a hammer to break the glass targets. Louie makes his way down the row of targets with his hammer, ultimately giving a blow to Donald's hand. The boys attempt to abscond with Donald's prizes, but he uses his cane to catch them, take the candy back, then club them away from his booth.

The boys spot the nearby "Mystic Medium" booth, and hastily disguise themselves as a comely female medium to attract Donald. Donald runs over with a gift of candy and attempts to engage a physically romantic relationship with the female medium. Just as Donald makes his move, the nephews engage the mechanism to start the effects of the coming of a mummified Ramesses VI. Donald is initially fooled, handing monetary donations to the mummy, but then notices that the "king" is merely the three nephews. A chase ensues that ends up back at Donald's shooting gallery. After tripping and hitting his head on one of the motorized shooting target racks, Donald ends up stuck on it, becoming a shooting gallery target himself. The boys walk off with Donald's boxes of candy, singing their cadet song.

== Voice cast ==
- Clarence Nash as Donald Duck, Huey, Dewey, and Louie

== Television ==
- Mickey's Mouse Tracks, episode #8
- Donald's Quack Attack, episode #70

== Home media ==
The short was released on December 11, 2007, on Walt Disney Treasures: The Chronological Donald, Volume Three: 1947-1950.

Additional releases include:

- Walt Disney's Funny Factory: Volume 4, With Huey, Dewey, & Louie
