= Donald's Off Day =

1944 Donald Duck cartoon

- Theatrical release poster
- Directed by: Jack Hannah
- Story by: Bill Berg; Dick Shaw
- Produced by: Walt Disney
- Starring: Clarence Nash
- Music by: Paul J. Smith opening song sung by Adriana Caselotti
- Animation by: John Reed; Art Scott; Harvey Toombs; Judge Whitaker
- Layouts by: Yale Gracey
- Backgrounds by: Thelma Witmer
- Color process: Technicolor
- Production company: Walt Disney Productions
- Distributed by: RKO Radio Pictures
- Release date: December 8, 1944
- Running time: 7:30
- Country: United States
- Language: English

Donald's Off Day is a 1944 Walt Disney animated short by Jack Hannah starring Donald Duck and Huey, Louie and Dewey. It stars the nephews tricking Donald into thinking that he is seriously ill.

This cartoon was Hannah's debut as an animation director. Veteran animator Jack King was slated to direct the short, but Hannah argued that King wasn't up to it:

I got it filled with a lot of personality bits which I always believed were more important in a story than just a series of gags. I went to [head of Story Hal Adelquist] and said, "I'd just love to direct this." As much as I like Jack King, I can't see him directing these personality sequences. Carl [Barks] and I always were disturbed that King put one of our stories onto the screen without looking for further development in the personalities of the characters... The next thing I knew, Adelquist came up to me and told me Walt had said it was okay to pick up another story to direct. So I picked up another one, and ended up directing cartoons for Disney for the next seventeen years.

== Plot ==
Donald wakes up one morning noticing that it is a sunny day outside he feels excited and prepares himself to go out to play golf as quickly as possible. However, as soon as he leaves his house, out of nowhere, a rainy thunderstorm comes crashing down the sky. Now in a bad mood, he acts rudely towards his three nephews Huey, Dewey and Louie, who decide to play a trick on him. As Donald reads through a medical book to pass the time while it rains outside, the nephews manage to fool him into believing he actually is sick. As Donald is laid to rest on his couch, they sneak a little toy rabbit with an air pump underneath his blanket and start pumping air into it. Donald assumes it is his heart beating overtime and fears that he is about to die. Eventually he discovers he has been fooled all along and wants to punish Huey, Louie and Dewey, but then it stops raining and Donald is immediately overjoyed. He runs outside with his golf gear, only for the thunderstorm to return immediately, and Donald is struck by lightning.

== Voice cast ==
- Clarence Nash as Donald Duck, Huey, Dewey and Louie
- Adriana Caselotti as Singer of opening song
- John Dehner as Doctor Quack

== Home media ==
The short was released on December 6, 2005, on Walt Disney Treasures: The Chronological Donald, Volume Two: 1942-1946.
