= Sea Scouts (film) =

1939 Donald Duck cartoon

- Theatrical release poster
- Directed by: Dick Lundy
- Story by: Carl Barks
- Produced by: Walt Disney
- Starring: Clarence Nash
- Music by: Oliver Wallace
- Animation by: Art Moore; Preston Blair; Johnny Cannon; Larry Clemmons; Walt Clinton; Jack Hannah; Ed Love
- Backgrounds by: Jim Carmichael
- Color process: Technicolor
- Production company: Walt Disney Productions
- Distributed by: RKO Radio Pictures
- Release date: June 30, 1939
- Running time: 8 minutes
- Country: United States
- Language: English

Sea Scouts is an animated cartoon short film in the Donald Duck series. It was produced in Technicolor by Walt Disney Productions and released to theaters on June 30, 1939, by RKO Radio Pictures.

== Plot ==
The film opens with sea scouts Donald Duck & his three nephews, Huey, Dewey, and Louie at sea. They are first seen rowing out to Donald's large ship in a small rowboat, with Donald conducting the rowing who says to the audience "Some class, huh?"

Aboard Donald's ship, he acts as a proud and able sea captain. He is forced to move aside when a seagull almost defecates on his sea captain hat, and then discovers that his nephews have fallen asleep. He yells at them to wake up and they bump into each other in their haste to follow his orders (this continues throughout the film due to their clumsiness). They are asked to raise the anchor, but as they are raising it, it gets caught on a rock under the water. Not realizing what's wrong, Donald attempts to raise the anchor himself but runs into the same problem. Angrily, he tries again but pushes so hard the boat sinks instead of the anchor rising and goes underwater. At first, Donald does not know what has happened – even thinking he sees "flying fish" and "flying turtles" – but finally finds out what has happened, and lowers the anchor to make the boat rise. In the process, he is thrown into the mast, getting tangled up in flags. His nephews find this funny and laugh, but Donald responds by angrily telling them to raise the sail. However, they do not raise it properly, pulling the sail, while still between its masts, upward instead of outward. When he tells them to do it the right way, they say "Aye aye, sir!" and unintentionally let it fall on Donald. Donald loses his temper and raises the sail himself, and the ship finally leaves the dock.

Donald forgets to untie the rope holding the ship to the dock, and the ship stays in place. Then a gust of wind tears the mast loose, taking Donald up with it and knocking his hat off. He tells his nephews to lower him down so he can retrieve it, but suddenly, a big, hungry shark appears, wanting to devour Donald. His nephews mess up again by lowering the rope downwards instead of upwards and saying "Aye aye, sir!", letting go of the rope and letting him fall on the rope toward the shark's mouth. He manages to get off just in time and escapes by hanging on a cable attached to the boat.

His nephews set out to rescue him by getting into the rowboat and paddling to below the spot where he is hanging, carrying a lifebuoy, but the shark scares them off after Donald has already let go, causing him to fall down into the water right in front of the shark. A fast chase around the bay then ensues, as Donald attempts to avoid getting eaten by the shark. Several close calls happen, including one where Donald is in the shark's mouth and is saved only by his lifebuoy preventing the shark's jaws from closing. Finally, Donald is rammed into his ship, with his hat being messed up in the process. Enraged, he charges full speed at the shark and punches it in the nose, knocking it backwards onto a buoy. The film ends with Donald and his nephews rowing back to shore with the lifebuoy stuck on Donald's rear end in big letters, describing Donald position as the "S.S. Rear Admiral".

== Voice cast ==
- Clarence Nash as Donald Duck, Huey, Dewey and Louie
- Jimmy MacDonald as Shark (growls)

== Home media ==
The short was released on May 18, 2004, on Walt Disney Treasures: The Chronological Donald, Volume One: 1934-1941.
