= Huey, Dewey, and Louie =

Disney cartoon characters

- Donald Duck / Mickey Mouse characters
- Louie (left) Huey (center) and Dewey (right)
- First appearance: In print: Silly Symphonies featuring Donald Duck Sunday newspaper strip (October 17, 1937); In animation: Donald's Nephews (1938)
- Created by: Al Taliaferro; Carl Barks
- Designed by: Carl Barks
- Voiced by: Clarence Nash (1938–1965); Dick Beals (1967); Tony Anselmo (1986–87, 1999–2003, 2012); Russi Taylor (1987–2019); Melissa Hutchison (2025–present); In Quack Pack: Huey: Jeannie Elias; Dewey: Pamela Adlon; Louie: Elizabeth Daily; In DuckTales (2017): Huey: Danny Pudi; Dewey: Ben Schwartz; Louie: Bobby Moynihan

In-universe information
- Full name: Huey: Hubert Duck (Quack Pack and DuckTales 2017); Dewey: Deuteronomy D. Duck (Quack Pack), Dewford Dingus Duck (DuckTales 2017); Louie: Louis Duck (Quack Pack), Llewellyn Duck (DuckTales 2017)
- Species: Pekin ducks
- Gender: Male
- Occupation: Students (trained scouts)
- Family: Duck family
- Relatives: Mr. Duck (father); Della Duck (mother); Donald Duck (maternal uncle, legal guardian); Scrooge McDuck (maternal granduncle); Ludwig Von Drake (maternal granduncle); Gladstone Gander (first cousin once removed); Quackmore Duck (maternal grandfather); Hortense McDuck (maternal grandmother); Daphne Duck (maternal grandaunt); Matilda McDuck (maternal grandaunt); Eider Duck (maternal great-uncle); Humperdink Duck (maternal great-grandfather); Elvira "Grandma" Duck (maternal great-grandmother)
- Nationality: American

Huey, Dewey, and Louie Duck are triplet cartoon characters created by storyboard artist and screenwriter Carl Barks for The Walt Disney Company from an idea proposed by cartoonist Al Taliaferro. They are the nephews of Donald Duck and the grand-nephews of Scrooge McDuck. Like their maternal uncles, the brothers are domestic anthropomorphic white ducks with yellow-orange bills and feet. The boys are sometimes distinguished by the color of their shirts and baseball caps (with Huey wearing red clothing, Dewey wearing blue clothing, and Louie wearing green clothing). They appeared in many Donald Duck animated shorts, as well as in the television show DuckTales and its reboot, but the comics remain their primary medium.

While the boys were originally created as troublemakers to provoke Donald's famous easily triggered temper, in later appearances, beginning especially in the comic books stories by Carl Barks, they are shown growing to be heroes in their own right and valuable assets to him and Uncle Scrooge on their adventures. All three of the triplets are members of a fictional scouting organization called the Junior Woodchucks.

== Origins ==
Final panel of 1937 Sunday newspaper strip Silly Symphonies featuring Donald Duck that introduced Donald's nephews; drawn by Al Taliaferro

Al Taliaferro, the artist for the Silly Symphony comic strip, proposed the idea for the film Donald's Nephews, so that the studio would have duck counterparts to Morty and Ferdie Fieldmouse, the nephews of Mickey Mouse. The Walt Disney Productions Story Dept. on February 5, 1937, sent Taliaferro a memo recognizing him as the source of the idea for the planned short.

The memo indicated, “we have decided to actually put a story crew to work on Donald’s Nephews.” With the short already in production more than eight months before the boys' Silly Symphonies comic strip debut (on October 17, 1937), the animation studio's model sheet and storyline would have been Taliaferro and writer Ted Osborne's frame of reference for the comic strip. Because the strip was an adaptation of the animated shorts, it could utilize ideas from films still in production (DuckTales reversed this, being a TV adaptation of the comics). Similarly, Barks' Junior Woodchuck prototype, Good Scouts, was released three months after identical scouting uniforms were introduced by Taliaferro and Bob Karp in the comic strip.

The nephews being triplets who finished each other's sentences was developed by Carl Barks, the screenwriter of Donald's Nephews, for whom Happy Hooligan, a comic strip that featured such triplets, was a childhood influence. This characteristic appeared for the first time at the end of the film, as the boys parted with Donald. In the comic strip, it was first implemented a week after the film's release.

The nephews' names were devised by Disney gag man Dana Coty, who took them from Huey Long, Thomas Dewey, and Louis Schmitt, a Disney Studio animator. In translation, the nephews' names often follow the repetition (parachesis) of their names in English, for example: Tupu, Hupu and Lupu (Finnish) and Hyzio, Dyzio and Zyzio (Polish).

=== Character background ===
Huey, Dewey, and Louie are the sons of Donald's sister Della Duck; in Donald's Nephews, their mother is instead named Dumbella. In the original theatrical shorts, they were originally sent to visit Donald for only one day; in the comics, the three were sent to stay with Donald on a temporary basis, until their father came back from the hospital (the boys ended up sending him there after an attempted practical joke of putting firecrackers under his chair). In both the comics and animated shorts, the boys' parents were never heard from or mentioned again after these instances, with the boys ending up permanently living with Donald. All four of them live in the fictional city of Duckburg, in the fictional state of Calisota.

In the theatrical shorts, Huey, Dewey, and Louie often behave in a rambunctious and mischievous manner, and they sometimes commit retaliation or revenge on Donald. In the early Barks comics, the ducklings were still wild and unruly, but their character improved considerably due to their membership in the Junior Woodchucks and the good influence of Grandma Duck. As the boys mature, they prefer to assist Donald and Scrooge in the adventure at hand. They occasionally interact with Daisy Duck’s nieces, April, May, and June.

== Features ==
=== Colors of Huey, Dewey, and Louie's outfits ===
Self-referential humor: Scrooge with Huey, Dewey, and Louie in "Return to Plain Awful" (1989) by Don Rosa

In early comic books and shorts, the caps of Huey, Dewey, and Louie were colored randomly, depending on the whim of the colorist. On a few occasions until 1945 and most cartoons shortly afterward, all three nephews wore identical outfits (most commonly red).

It was not until the 1980s when it became established that Huey is dressed in pink then in 1982 changed to red, Dewey in black then in 1982 changed to blue, and Louie in brown then in 1982 changed to green. Disney's archivist Dave Smith, in "Disney A to Z", said, "Note that the brightest hue of the three is red (Huey), the color of water, dew, is blue (Dewey), and that leaves Louie, and leaves are green (Louie)."

A few random combinations appear in early Disney merchandise and books, such as orange and yellow. Another combination that shows up from time to time is Huey in blue, Dewey in green, and Louie in red. In-story, this inconsistency is explained away as a result of the ducklings borrowing each other's clothes. The trio have often been depicted wearing indistinguishable black shirts (or the same dark color).

The Don Rosa story An Eye for Detail (1997) was based around Donald spending so much time trying to tell his three nephews apart that he developed a heightened sense of sight.

=== Voices ===
Clarence Nash, Donald's voice actor, voiced the nephews in the cartoon shorts, making their voices just as duck-like (and thereby difficult to understand) as Donald's. Huey, Dewey, and Louie were all voiced by Russi Taylor in DuckTales. In Quack Pack, they were voiced by Jeannie Elias, Pamela Segall, and Elizabeth Daily, respectively. Tony Anselmo voiced the characters in Donald Duck, The Star-Struck (1986), Down and Out with Donald Duck (1987), Mickey Mouse Works, House of Mouse, and the Have a Laugh! shorts, while Taylor continued voicing the trio in other projects, such as the video games, Donald Duck: Goin' Quackers and Mickey's Speedway USA, and the direct-to-video films Mickey's Once and Twice Upon a Christmas. Taylor also reprised her role as the nephews in the DuckTales: Remastered video game and the post-2013 Mickey Mouse shorts until her death in 2019. Danny Pudi, Ben Schwartz, and Bobby Moynihan voiced the trio in the 2017 DuckTales reboot. In the Mickey Mouse Funhouse episode segment Sitting Ducks, Melissa Hutchison voiced Huey, Dewey & Louie.

== Phooey Duck ==
Panel with Huey, Dewey, and Louie along with a fourth nephew, Phooey Duck

On a few occasions, an artist by error drew four nephews and the error was published. This fourth nephew has been named Phooey Duck by Disney comic editor Bob Foster.

The six-page Danish Egmont-licensed Disney comic Much Ado About Phooey (1999), plotted by Lars Jensen, scripted by Jack Sutter and drawn by Tino Santanach Hernandez, used Phooey as a character and explained Phooey's sporadic appearances as a freak incident of nature. (The text in the two speech balloons says "It is a fourth nephew! An exact copy of the others! / Yes, it's probably best that I explain".) Phooey also made a cameo appearance in the 2017 DuckTales animated series episode, "A Nightmare on Killmotor Hill!", during a dream sequence.

== Comics ==
In the comics, Huey, Dewey, and Louie often play a major role in most stories involving either their "Unca Donald" or great-uncle Scrooge McDuck, accompanying them on most of their adventures. Originating in the comics is the boys' membership in the Boy Scouts of America-like organization, the Junior Woodchucks, including their use of the Junior Woodchucks Guidebook, a fantastically exhaustive field guide containing information on science, history and survival skills. This youth organization, which has twin goals of preserving knowledge and protecting the environment, was instrumental in transforming the three brothers from "little hellions" to upstanding young ducks.

In Disney comic writer Don Rosa's continuity, Huey, Dewey, and Louie Duck were born around 1940 in Duckburg. In his award-winning epic series, Life and Times of Scrooge McDuck, Rosa reveals the domestic pain felt by the boys' loss of their parents. When Scrooge first meets Donald and his nephews, he says: "I'm not used to relatives, either! The few I had seem to have... disappeared!" Huey, Dewey, and Louie respond: "We know how that feels, Unca Scrooge!"

In Some Heir Over the Rainbow by Carl Barks, Huey, Dewey, and Louie, along with Donald Duck and Gladstone Gander, are tested by Scrooge McDuck, who wants to pick an heir to his fortune. Using the legend of a pot of gold at the end of a rainbow, Scrooge secretly gives the nephews, Donald and their cousin each $1,000 to invest. Donald uses his money for a down payment of a new car, now being $1,000 in debt. Gladstone, considering himself too lucky to need the money this soon, hides the money for when and if he needs it, causing Scrooge to consider him a better option than Donald. Huey, Dewey, and Louie lend their money to a man who claims to need the money to search for a treasure. Initially thinking they were tricked out of the money, Scrooge actually considers leaving his fortune to Gladstone, even though he sees that as "an awful injustice to the world", but the man actually finds the treasure and pays the kids back. Scrooge makes Huey, Dewey, and Louie his heirs. It seems to be the most solidly canonical indication of Scrooge's plans.

In a 1994 interview, Erik Svane asked Barks who would inherit Scrooge's money. Barks' response was "Probably Donald's nephews." Svane further queried, "Why would Huey, Dewey and Louie receive it?" Barks: "Oh, well, because they are so much more practical than Donald. In the later stories, as I developed those duck people and the whole community of Duckburg and all of its problems, I began giving those kids much more intelligence than anybody else in Duckburg. And so, I guess that when Uncle Scrooge passes on, he will leave all of his money to his three nephews. And I'm sure they will do a lot of good in the world, their Junior Woodchucks organization. They will save all the birds and all the whales."

== Television ==
Huey, Dewey, and Louie, as they are seen in the original DuckTales animated series

Huey, Dewey, and Louie starred in the 1987 animated television series DuckTales, in which they went on adventures with their great-uncle, Scrooge McDuck, after their "Unca Donald" left them with him to enlist in the U.S. Navy. The boys' personalities in this series were mainly based on their comic book appearances versus the theatrical shorts. In the 1996 series Quack Pack, the three were portrayed as teenagers and given further distinct personalities, with Huey serving as the group's leader, Dewey as a computer whiz, and Louie as a sports enthusiast. Quack Pack also established their real full names to be Hubert Duck (Huey), Deuteronomy D. Duck (Dewey), and Louis Duck (Louie). After Quack Pack, the boys were reverted to their original ages for most appearances, including the 1999 series Mickey Mouse Works. An exception was the 2001 series House of Mouse, in which they served as the house band in a variety of different styles (most commonly as "The Quackstreet Boys").

In the 2017 DuckTales series, the brothers are once again given distinct designs, voices, and personalities: Huey is intelligent and logical, Dewey is adventurous and excitable, and Louie is laid-back and cunning. The boys move to Scrooge's mansion with Donald after Dewey accidentally destroys their houseboat and travel the world on adventures with their uncles. They also have different roles: Huey is a Junior Woodchuck, Dewey likes to go on adventures, and Louie wants to be wealthy like Scrooge, except that he likes to do everything the easy way. This iteration also changed Dewey's real given name to Dewford (while making Dingus his middle name) and Louie's real given name to Llewellyn, while Huey maintained his real given name Hubert from Quack Pack. In the second season, the boys are reunited with their long-lost mother Della, who reveals she intended to name them "Jet (Huey), Turbo (Dewey), and Rebel (Louie)" before she disappeared, after which Donald named them instead.

== Video games ==
Huey, Dewey and Louie have been given many appearances in video games over the years, starting with DuckTales (1989), a popular NES game based on the show, wherein they aid their Uncle Scrooge in finding treasure. The game also got a remaster in 2013.

In The Lucky Dime Caper (1991) for Sega's Game Gear and Master System, the nephews are kidnapped by Magica De Spell. Donald must find Scrooge's lucky dime and barter for their safety. The trio also appear in the Sega Genesis and Sega Saturn game, Quackshot (1991), piloting Donald's plane as he travels the world in search of a lost treasure. The object of Disney's Magical Quest 3 Starring Mickey & Donald (1995), for Super Famicom (Japan) and Game Boy Advance, is to rescue the nephews from the clutches of the villainous King Pete.

Donald Duck: Goin' Quackers (2000) was released for many gaming systems. The boys aid Donald to bat Gladstone in rescuing Daisy Duck, while he also rescues their hexed play toys. The nephews appear as unlockable playable characters in Mickey's Speedway USA (2000) for Nintendo 64. In Dance Dance Revolution: Disney Mix (2000), that premiered as an arcade game in Japan and afterward on PlayStation and as a Plug-and-Play handheld TV game, they appear as DJ's for certain music tracks. They are playable characters in Disney Magic Kingdoms (2016), a Disney Parks themed game for iOS, Android and Windows.

=== Kingdom Hearts ===
Huey, Dewey, and Louie have recurring roles as shopkeepers in the Kingdom Hearts video game series. In the first entry (2002), the trio work in the item shop in the First District of Traverse Town. In Kingdom Hearts II (2005), they individually run an item shop (Huey), an accessory shop (Dewey), and a weapon shop (Louie) in Hollow Bastion/Radiant Garden. In both games' endings, they are seen returning to Disney Castle.

Kingdom Hearts Birth by Sleep (2010) features the nephews in Disney Town, recreating Ice Cream flavors, this time with a speaking role. Kingdom Hearts Coded (2008) also has Huey, Dewey, and Louie in Traverse Town, much like the first game. The three nephews were investigating the strange block phenomena occurring in their world which also resided inside Jiminy's journal. In Kingdom Hearts χ (2013), they are displayed on special Support medals that grant the player's other medals a set number of experience points based on the medal's star value. They appear in the Tram Common area of Twilight Town in Kingdom Hearts III (2019), where they each take turns running the gummi shop. In all of their Kingdom Hearts appearances, the nephews look similar to their appearance in the original DuckTales.

== Parks and attractions ==
Huey, Dewey and Louie have made numerous appearances at Disney theme parks.

=== Tokyo Disney ===
The nephews appeared in seasonal parades during Easter, Halloween and Christmas 2011 after a long absence. They also appeared in the Countdown Party Parade 2011.

=== Disneyland Paris ===
Huey, Dewey and Louie appear regularly in Paris. They appeared during the Christmas season 2010 in their daytime and nighttime Parades at "Disneyland Paris's Magic Kingdom", Disney's Once Upon a Dream Parade and in the Disney's Fantillusion Parade in glittery outfits. They made another appearance at Disneyland Paris for meet-and-greet at the Disneyland Hotel on April 2, 2011, the day of the Press Event for the launch of the Magical Moments Festival. They also appeared at Disney's Once Upon a Dream Parade at the Disneyland Park in special outfits for the parade and at the Disney's Stars 'n' Cars Parade at the Walt Disney Studios Park in directors outfits.

The nephews appeared at Disneyland Paris's Halloween season 2011. They have their own show during Mickey's Not-So-Scary Halloween Parties at the Disneyland Park in Disneyland Paris, titled Huey, Dewey and Louie's Trick or Treat Party. They also made an appearance for meet-and-greet at Disneyland Paris's "Disney's Halloween Party" on October 31, 2011. They were also part of the Christmas Eve and New Year's Eve 2011–2012 celebrations at the Disneyland Hotel.

== List of character appearances ==
=== Theatrical shorts ===
#	Short film	Date	Shirt Colours	Notes
1	Donald's Nephews	April 15, 1938	Red, Green, Orange	
2	Good Scouts	July 8, 1938	All scout uniforms	
3	Donald's Golf Game	November 4, 1938	Red, Yellow, Orange	
4	The Hockey Champ	April 28, 1939	Red, Green, Orange	
5	Sea Scouts	June 30, 1939	All Red	
6	Mr. Duck Steps Out	June 7, 1940	Yellow, Green, Red	Also starring Daisy Duck
7	Fire Chief	December 13, 1940	Red, Yellow, Blue/All Red	
8	All Together	January 13, 1942	All Red	A WWII Cartoon
9	The Nifty Nineties	June 20, 1941	All Blue	A Mickey Mouse Cartoon
10	Truant Officer Donald	August 1, 1941	Red, Green, Orange	
11	Donald's Snow Fight	April 10, 1942	Red, Green, Orange	
12	Home Defense	November 26, 1943	All Red	
13	Donald Duck and the Gorilla	March 31, 1944	Red, Yellow, Green	
14	Donald's Off Day	December 8, 1944	All Red	
15	Donald's Crime	June 29, 1945	Red, Green, Orange	Also starring Daisy Duck
16	Straight Shooters	April 18, 1947	All Red	
17	Soup's On	October 15, 1948	All Red	
18	Donald's Happy Birthday	February 11, 1949	All Red	
19	Lion Around	January 20, 1950	All Red	
20	Lucky Number	July 20, 1951	All Red	
21	Trick or Treat	October 10, 1952	Various Halloween costumes	Also starring Witch Hazel
22	Don's Fountain of Youth	May 30, 1953	All Red	
23	Canvas Back Duck	December 25, 1953	All Red	Also starring Peg Leg Pete
24	Spare the Rod	January 15, 1954	All Green/Red	
25	Donald's Diary	March 5, 1954	All Light Blue	Also starring Daisy Duck; Huey, Dewey and Louie (who are not named) are Daisy's little brothers and not Donald's Nephews
26	The Litterbug	June 21, 1961	Red, Yellow, Green	
27	Donald's Fire Survival Plan	May 5, 1966	All Red	
28	Scrooge McDuck and Money	March 23, 1967	All blue	

=== Feature films ===
- Mickey's Christmas Carol (1983) (cameo)
- Who Framed Roger Rabbit (1988) (cameo)
- DuckTales the Movie: Treasure of the Lost Lamp (1990)
- Mickey's Once Upon a Christmas (1999)
- Mickey's Magical Christmas: Snowed in at the House of Mouse (2001)
- Mickey's House of Villains (2002)
- Mickey's Twice Upon a Christmas (2004)
- Chip 'n Dale: Rescue Rangers (2022) (cameo)

=== Television shows and specials ===
- Donald Duck Presents (1983)
- DuckTales (1987)
- Sport Goofy in Soccermania (1987)
- Cartoon All-Stars to the Rescue (1990)
- Quack Pack (1996)
- Mickey Mouse Works (1999)
- House of Mouse (2001)
- Mickey Mouse (2013)
- DuckTales (2017)
- The Wonderful World of Mickey Mouse (2020)
- Once Upon a Studio (2023)
- Mickey Mouse Funhouse (2025)

=== Video games ===
- DuckTales (1989)
- The Lucky Dime Caper (1991)
- Quackshot (1991)
- Disney's Magical Quest 3 Starring Mickey & Donald (1995)
- Donald Duck: Goin' Quackers (2000)
- Mickey's Speedway USA (2000)
- Dance Dance Revolution: Disney Mix (2000)
- Kingdom Hearts (2002)
- Kingdom Hearts II (2005)
- Kingdom Hearts: Birth By Sleep (2010)
- DuckTales: Remastered (2013)
- Kingdom Hearts Unchained (2013)
- Disney Magic Kingdoms (2016)
- Kingdom Hearts III (2019)

== See also ==
- Disney comics
- Junior Woodchucks
- Duck family (Disney)
- Donald Duck universe
- Donald Duck in comics
- Donald Duck and Scrooge McDuck
