= Alpine Antics (1936 film) =

1936 film by Jack King

- Title card
- Directed by: Jack King
- Story by: Melvin Millar
- Produced by: Leon Schlesinger
- Starring: Tommy Bond; Billy Bletcher; Bernice Hansen
- Music by: Norman Spencer
- Animation by: Riley Thomson; Jack Carr
- Color process: Black-and-white
- Production company: Leon Schlesinger Productions
- Distributed by: Warner Bros. Productions; The Vitaphone Corporation
- Release date: March 9, 1936
- Running time: 7 min
- Country: United States
- Language: English

Alpine Antics is a 1936 American animated comedy short film directed by Jack King. It was released on March 9, 1936. It is the 66th film in the Looney Tunes series and the sixth cartoon to star Beans, as well as the fourth to feature Porky Pig.

== Plot ==
Various animals ice skate on a frozen lake. Three snowmen sing and dance, not realizing they are walking in front of a campfire which melts them. A character tries to dive after pouring boiling water into a hole, only to end up trapped in an ice cube.

Beans and Little Kitty are sledding, only to spot a poster advertising a skiing contest that awards $200 million. A bully overhearing this sabotages his skis, so he improvises by using sled rails as substitutes. The bully is shocked by Beans' skis, so he straps a rocket that sends Beans flying backwards as the contest starts. The bully is the only competitor with conventional gear, as the other competitors sans Beans are equipped with elaborate yet impractical skis. The bully sabotages competitors using a ski with wheels, horse and sled with a rope, only for Beans to run over it and tie the bully to a tree.

Beans tries to jump over a gap, but is stuck on the cliff while being overtaken by the bully until a dachshund throws him up. The bully is then knocked out by a duck riding a dachshund while trying to sabotage them, who then hit a tree. The bully tricks Beans into doing a backflip then chases him, eventually landing on top of him and traveling on a rooftop while Beans passes a house, which proves to be his undoing as he hits a tree and is flung forward. Even though he overtakes Beans, he lands on a circular sheet of broken ice and sinks while Beans arrives at the finish line. Beans is hailed as the winner, only for the bully to emerge from the water under him.

== Home media ==
DVD:

- Looney Tunes Golden Collection: Volume 5
- Porky Pig 101

== See also ==
- Porky Pig filmography
- Looney Tunes and Merrie Melodies filmography (1930–1939)
