= Westward Whoa =

1936 film by Jack King

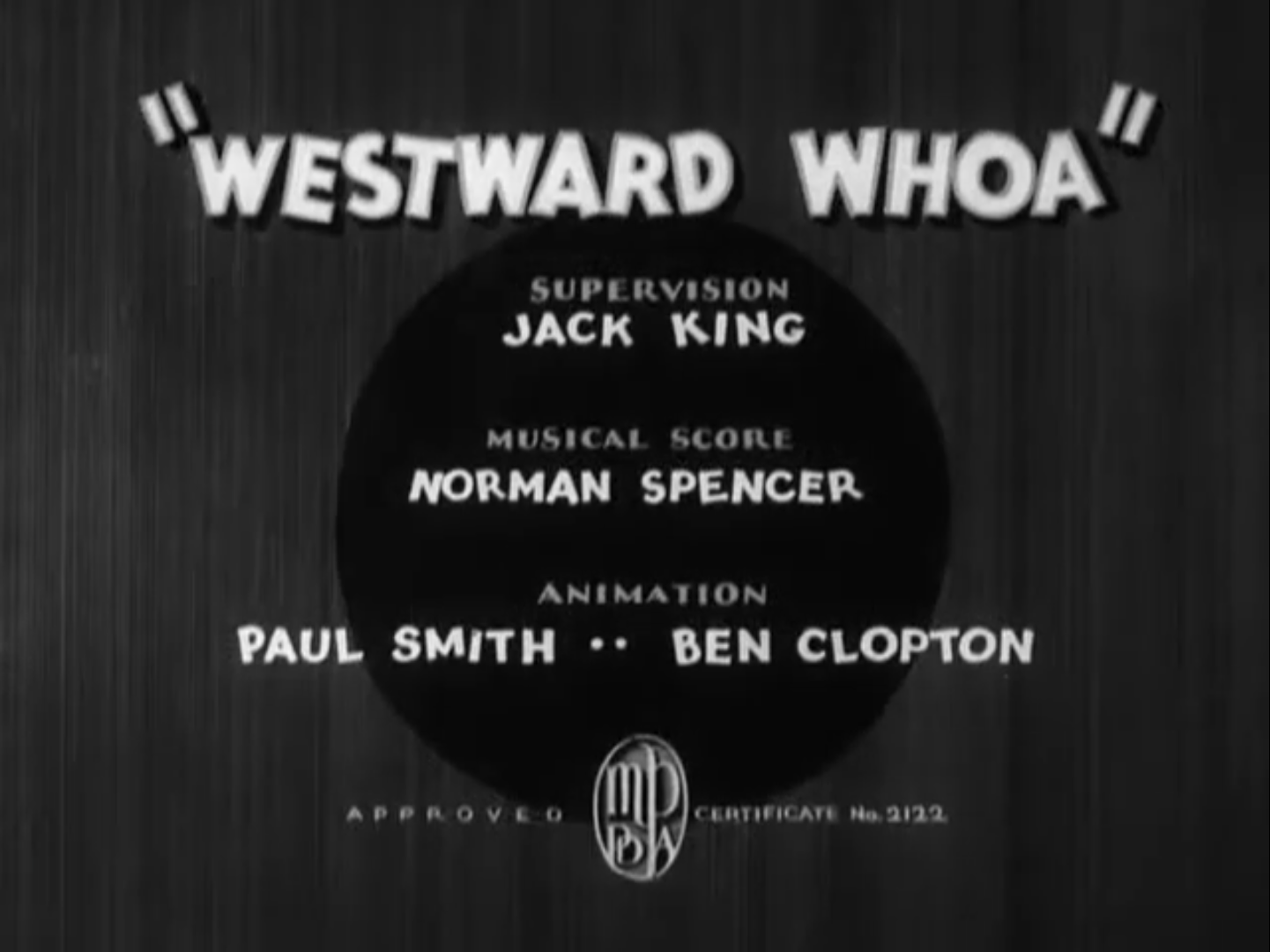
- Title card
- Directed by: Jack King
- Produced by: Leon Schlesinger
- Starring: Tommy Bond; Bernice Hansen; Joe Dougherty
- Music by: Norman Spencer
- Animation by: Paul Smith; Ben Clopton
- Color process: Black-and-white
- Production company: Leon Schlesinger Productions
- Distributed by: Warner Bros. Productions; The Vitaphone Corporation
- Release date: April 25, 1936
- Running time: 7 minutes
- Country: United States
- Language: English

Westward Whoa is a 1936 animated comedy short film directed by Jack King. It is the 69th film in the Looney Tunes series and the seventh cartoon to star Beans, the sixth cartoon to star Porky Pig as well as the fourth and final cartoon to feature Ham and Ex. The film is a Western adaptation of the ancient fable "The Boy Who Cried Wolf." The film is in the public domain after Warner Bros. Pictures failed to renew the copyright in 1964.

== Plot ==
Beans and his companions are traveling and exploring in a wagon train. Beans and Little Kitty play the accordion and guitar and sing with other passengers, while Porky Pig follows on a donkey. At night, they stop for the night, with Porky Pig and a dog entertaining the passengers by dancing.

Ham and Ex find a turkey behind a rock, deciding to entertain themselves by alerting Beans of possible Native Americans due to the similarity in appearance. Beans and his peers open fire and discover the truth. An angered Beans warns the two not to make any more false alarms, which they react by doing so again. Just as Beans wastes more firepower to the false alarm, an actual Native American abducts one of the twins, while the other leads them to a log where they beat up the Native American, after which they hide in a chest.

While Ham and Ex technically did not lie, Beans and Little Kitty disregards their cries for help as they wash clothes, while Porky comments on their foolishness, not realizing the truth until the entire tribe is summoned and unleashes an assault on the wagon train. Little Kitty saves Beans by hitting a Native with a lever with clothes, while Beans uses a stove to return arrow shots. The dog subdues numerous Indians. Beans sneak attacks a Native by clubbing him, ultimately also incapacitating a Native who attempts to backstab him. Porky Pig tries to shoot in his extremely baggy pants, which is fixed by an incoming arrow. Ham and Ex enter a shelf and club a Native from above, but are subdued when the Native cuts it in half. Beans swings a bear trap to maim the Native and save Ham and Ex. Beans then does another Native American alarm to scare Ham and Ex into hiding in the chest as punishment.

== Home media ==
Westward Whoa is available on disc 1 of the Porky Pig 101 DVD set.

== See also ==
- Porky Pig filmography
- Looney Tunes and Merrie Melodies filmography (1930–1939)
- List of animated films in the public domain in the United States
