= Gold Diggers of '49 =

1935 film by Fred Avery

- Title card
- Directed by: Fred Avery
- Produced by: Leon Schlesinger
- Starring: Joe Dougherty; Tommy Bond; Billy Bletcher; Bernice Hansen
- Music by: Bernard Brown
- Animation by: Bob Clampett; Charles Jones
- Color process: Black-and-white
- Production company: Leon Schlesinger Productions
- Distributed by: Warner Bros. Productions; The Vitaphone Corporation
- Release date: November 2, 1935
- Running time: 8 min
- Country: United States
- Language: English

Gold Diggers of '49 is a 1935 American animated comedy short film directed by Fred Avery. It was released on November 2, 1935. It is the 63rd film in the Looney Tunes series, the third cartoon to star Beans and the second to star Porky Pig. It is the first non-Oswald the Lucky Rabbit cartoon to be directed by Avery, who would become one of the studio's most prolific directors until 1942.

== Plot ==
In July 1849, in the middle of the dilapidated town of Goldville, Little Kitty observes near a gathering, a poster announcing a young prospector Beans about to hunt for gold in Red Gulch. Little Kitty takes the poster and shows it to her adoptive father Porky Pig, who devours a large amount of food. Meanwhile, Beans comically digs straight down from the top of the mountain and finds a slot machine, winning gold by inserting one of his buttons. Beans notifies everyone in town and Little Kitty, whom he kisses before leaving with Porky.

At the site, Porky finds a nugget of gold underground, but the hole loops behind him, causing him to repeatedly reacquire the nugget. He helps Beans retrieve a chest which contains an old book titled "How to Acquire Gold", which contains the words, "Dig for it!" to their chagrin. A bandit finds Porky's bag and believes it to be gold, reeling it in with a lasso in a shotgun. Porky requests that Beans help him retrieve the bag and that he can take the contents if he does so.

Beans chases the bandit with his guns, shooting his hat and his pants, revealing him to have worn a metal pan on his buttocks as preparation. As Beans ducks to dodge bullets, he prepares a shotgun that fires him backward due to the recoil. Noticing his car's gasoline has run out, Beans uses a bottle of moonshine as a last resort fuel, causing the car to be driven at supersonic speeds and running over the bandit. He pulls Porky inside and crashes in town, where Little Kitty greets them, only to find out that the bag merely contained Porky's lunch.

== Production ==
Gold Diggers of '49 is the first Warner Bros. animated cartoon directed by Tex Avery, and the second to feature Porky Pig. The star is Beans the Cat, with Porky Pig as the father of Beans' fiancée, Little Kitty. Looking for suitable characters from the Warners stable to embellish, Avery took two child characters from the previous short I Haven't Got a Hat, turned them into adults, and, as Steve Schneider writes, "set the studio on track to making adult cartoons."

The short's title alludes to the California Gold Rush as well as to the popular Busby Berkeley musicals Gold Diggers of 1933 and Gold Diggers of 1935 (also released by Warner Bros).

== Home media ==
DVD:

- Looney Tunes Golden Collection: Volume 5
- Porky Pig 101

== See also ==
- Porky Pig filmography
- Looney Tunes and Merrie Melodies filmography (1930–1939)
