= Porky's Duck Hunt =

1937 film by Fred Avery

- Title card
- Directed by: Fred Avery
- Produced by: Leon Schlesinger
- Starring: Mel Blanc; Billy Bletcher; Paul Taylor Group; Ruth Cavert; Jackie Morrow
- Music by: Carl W. Stalling
- Animation by: Virgil Ross; Robert Cannon
- Color process: Black-and-white
- Production company: Leon Schlesinger Productions
- Distributed by: Warner Bros. Productions; The Vitaphone Corporation
- Release date: April 17, 1937
- Running time: 8 min
- Country: United States
- Language: English

Porky's Duck Hunt is a 1937 American animated comedy short film directed by Tex Avery. The cartoon was released on April 17, 1937. It is the 84th film in the Looney Tunes series, the 22nd cartoon to feature Porky Pig, the first to feature Daffy Duck and the first to have Mel Blanc voice Porky, as Joe Dougherty was fired due to his uncontrollable stuttering. Daffy Duck would become the series' most prominent character, appearing across films spanning 31 years until his retirement in 1968. It is also the first film in the series to credit Robert Cannon, who would become one of Avery's animators at Metro-Goldwyn-Mayer.

== Plot ==
Daffy Duck says his first line and bounces away for the first time.

Porky prepares for duck hunting, unknowingly pointing his shotgun at his dog, who is terrified and backs away. He accidentally shoots the ceiling, hurting his neighbor who is displeased by the attack. Porky leaves for the duck pond, where multiple hunters fail to shoot a single black duck. An idiotic hunter with a bent shotgun shoots down two fighter jets.

Porky launches numerous duck decoys, which attracts the black duck. The black duck attracts his attention, so he ducks below the water with a decoy on top to shoot him, only to be easily recognized. The duck stands on a barrel of alcohol, which Porky shoots, intoxicating five fish who go on a joyride on a boat while singing.

Porky is suspicious of the black duck, only for it to bite him. Porky shoots the duck, ordering his dog to retrieve him, only for the duck to knock him out and swim to shore. Porky questions the duck for not following the film's script, only for the duck to respond nonchalantly as it bounces away. The duck eats an electric eel and is electrocuted. Porky tries to eat his lunch, only to be triggered by numerous birds, including the duck, into shooting his boat and causing it to sink. Joe Penner emerges from the water and tries to sell Porky a duck. Porky tries to shoot the duck again but his shotgun jams; the duck mockingly fixes it and bounces away. Porky finds that the duck is flying with its peers and tries to use a whistle imitating a duck to attract them, only to be fired at by other hunter. He accidentally drops the whistle in his dog's mouth, causing them to be shot at as they run home. Humiliated, Porky tries one last shot at the ducks, who party outside his house, only to shoot his ceiling again to the chagrin of his neighbor. The duck bounces away at the end card.

== Voice cast ==
- Mel Blanc as Porky Pig / Daffy Duck
- Billy Bletcher as Upstairs Neighbor/ Drunk Bass Fish
- Paul Taylor Group as The Drunken Fish singing "On Moonlight Bay"
- Ruth Cavert as The Drunken Fish giggling (unconfirmed)
- Jackie Morrow as Joe Penner caricature

== Production notes ==
In this short, Porky Pig stars alongside Daffy Duck, marking Daffy's debut. Mel Blanc voices both characters, originally slated to voice only Daffy but taking over as Porky due to Joe Dougherty's firing after Porky's Romance due to his stutter.

== Home media ==
- VHS & Betamax 1985 - Daffy Duck: The Nuttiness Continues - Warner Home Video
- DVD 2011 - The Essential Daffy Duck (restored) - Warner Home Video
- DVD 2017 - Porky Pig 101 (restored) - Warner Archive Collection
- Blu-Ray 2025 - Looney Tunes Collector's Vault: Volume 1 (restored) - Warner Archive Collection

== See also ==
- Daffy Duck filmography
- Porky Pig filmography
- Looney Tunes and Merrie Melodies filmography (1930–1939)

Preceded by None – first short	Daffy Duck Cartoons; 1937	Succeeded by Daffy Duck & Egghead
