= Porky's Pet =

1936 film by Jack King

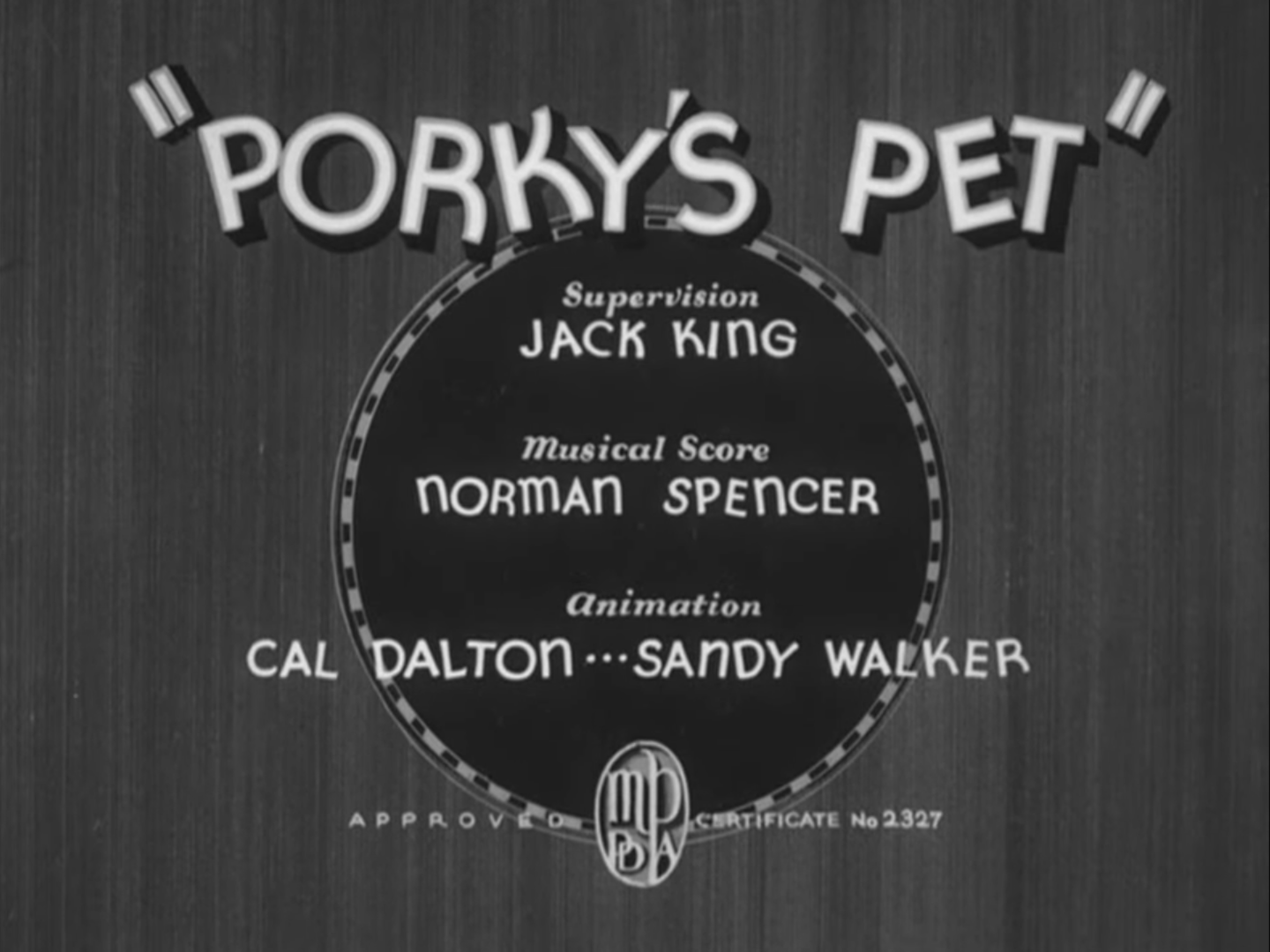
- Title card
- Directed by: Jack King
- Produced by: Leon Schlesinger
- Starring: Joe Dougherty; Billy Bletcher; Count Cutelli
- Music by: Norman Spencer
- Animation by: Cal Dalton; Sandy Walker
- Color process: Black-and-white
- Production company: Leon Schlesinger Productions
- Distributed by: Warner Bros. Productions; The Vitaphone Corporation
- Release date: July 11, 1936
- Running time: 6 mins
- Country: United States
- Language: English

Porky's Pet is a 1936 American animated comedy short film directed by Jack King. The short was released on July 11, 1936. It is the 72nd film in the Looney Tunes series and the tenth cartoon to feature Porky Pig.

== Plot ==
A mailman heads to Porky Pig's house and delivers a telegram to Porky. When Porky reads the telegram, he sees it is an offer from a big shot producer in Broadway, New York City, who wants Porky and his pet ostrich, Lulu, in his show, offering $75 a day (equal to $1,740 today). Porky wants the job, so he tells Lulu the good news and takes her on a leash to the train station.

Once there a passenger train speeds right past the station and Porky has to change the signal to stop the second train. Porky and Lulu get on board, but the conductor kicks them off, on account of a "no pets" policy. Porky tells Lulu to go down the tracks so he can pick her up when the train passes by. Porky gets on board and the train departs. When it passes by Lulu, Porky grabs her and pulls her in. Realizing what will happen if the conductor finds out, Porky shoves Lulu under his seat, but Lulu insists on poking her head out. She then squeezes out and swallows passengers' personal belongings, including a bald man's wig, a toy plane flown by either Ham or Ex, as well as an accordion.

Just then, the conductor comes asking the passengers for tickets. Porky sees him, shoves the noisy accordion down Lulu's throat to her stomach, stuffs her inside a guitar case and trims her sticking out tail feathers. When the conductor comes up to Porky, Lulu blows her cover by squawking, pushing her legs out, and taking the conductor on a wild ride to the other side of the coach. Angered, the conductor throws Lulu and Porky out of the train from the observation car. Porky spots a handcar in a siding and a cow grazing. He and Lulu hop on the handcar, and Porky grabs the cow's tail. The cow happily takes them down the track, the bizarre sight causing the conductor to faint.

== Home media ==
The short was released on DVD on Porky Pig 101, Disc 1.

== See also ==
- Porky Pig filmography
- Looney Tunes and Merrie Melodies filmography (1930–1939)
