= A Cartoonist's Nightmare =

1935 film by Jack King

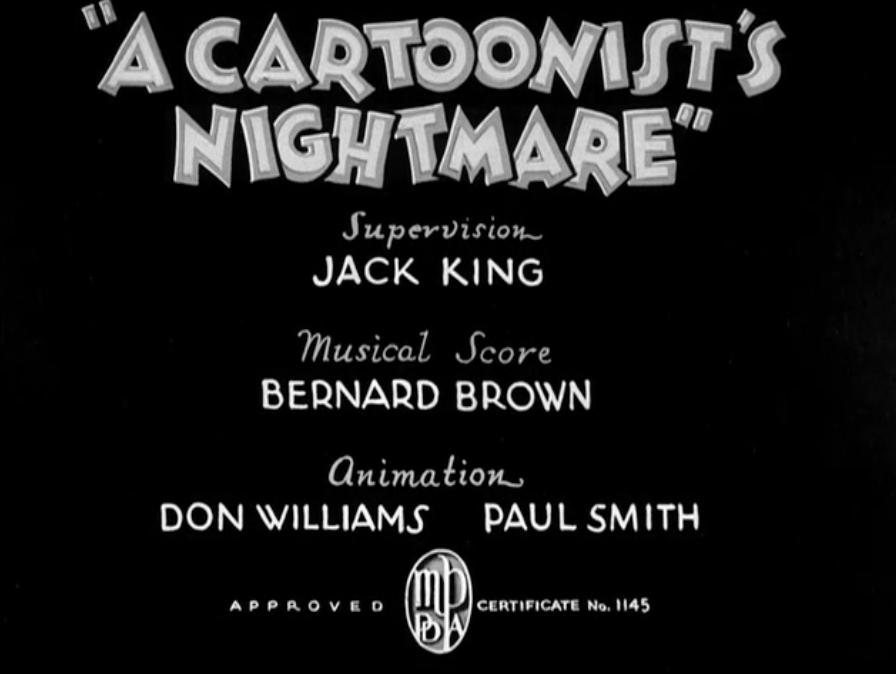
- Title card
- Directed by: Jack King
- Produced by: Leon Schlesinger
- Starring: Billy Bletcher; Tommy Bond
- Music by: Bernard Brown
- Animation by: Don Williams; Paul Smith
- Color process: Black and white
- Production company: Leon Schlesinger Productions
- Distributed by: Warner Bros. Productions; The Vitaphone Corporation
- Release date: September 14, 1935
- Running time: 7 min
- Country: United States
- Language: English

A Cartoonist's Nightmare is a 1935 American animated comedy short film directed by Jack King. It was released on September 14, 1935. It is the 61st film in the Looney Tunes series and the first cartoon to star Beans, making it the first Looney Tunes short to not star a human protagonist, either Bosko or Buddy.

== Plot ==
It is closing time at a run-down animation studio implied to be Leon Schlesinger Productions, and nearly all the staff members are leaving for the day, except for one animator, a caricature of animator Paul Smith, who needs to finish up with his work on a fictitious Beans cartoon while an elderly custodian keeps on watch. In the animator's drawing, he sketches a dungeon scene where Beans encounters a goblin. Weary for working several hours continuously, the animator decides to take a sleep after he draws a steel barricade between the two characters to prevent the goblin from reaching Beans.

After 30 minutes, the goblin comes to life and pulls the animator into the drawing, carrying him away beyond the scene. Shocked and terrified, the animator tries to break out of the goblin's grasp, but ends up getting punched many times. He is then brought into a mystic chamber where painted portraits of various villains are displayed on the walls, as they happened to be the animator's creations as well as those of his colleagues. Coming to life with the intent for revenge for how the animator and other cartoonists made them get subdued in the end of each film, the villains give him a pencil and force him to draw a deep and extremely detailed pit in the floor, where they toss him inside. Upon falling in, the animator holds onto a branch, trying to avoid being devoured by the crocodile at the bottom.

Back at the scene still being worked on, Beans still stands behind the barricade, unable to escape. Just then, an unknown female character comes to him, offering a lunchbox. Beans is expecting food but is a little surprised to find a saw in the bread. He uses it to cut his way out of the metal fence. Finally freeing himself, he goes around to find his animator.

Beans manages to find the chamber where his animator is being tormented by the villains laughing at him. To intervene, he hurls boots at the goblin, luring the villains away as they try to capture him. Beans manages to lose them somehow when he returns to the rescue. The animator receives the same pencil from Beans and draws a ladder to climb out the pit. When the villains return, the animator pulls the ladder out from the hole while Beans squirts grease from a grease gun between the room's entrance and the pit. The villains slide on the grease mess and fall into the hole, except for the goblin, who attempts to escape from the hole, but is punched by the angry animator into it. To vanquish the villains for good, the animator removes the hole with an eraser. Beans and the animator shake hands for a work well done.

It turns out that what the animator went through was merely a dream, as he is awaken by the custodian. To his relief, he finds the drawing on his desk unchanged. Not wanting to recall his experience, the animator happily erases both the goblin and the steel barricade and draws a platter with gelatin for Beans to eat, much to the latter's delight.

== Analysis ==
According to animation historian Michael Samerdyke, some classic Hollywood cartoons from the 1930s are "too scary for children" and A Cartoonist's Nightmare is one of them. He finds it to be a "very inventive" and interesting cartoon. Samerdyke notes that Beans the Cat had previously appeared in I Haven't Got a Hat (1935) as a tough little kitten. A Cartoonist's Nightmare casts Beans into the role of a hero. This gives "a nice heroic moment" for a character with a rather brief film career. Beans would not stay for long within the cast of characters of Warner Bros. Cartoons.

To Samerdyke, the main villain of the short (described as the goblin above) more closely resembles a gorilla. The rest of the villains seem to reside in the Villain Department of the studio. They sing their own villainous song: "The tables are turned and now you are in our clutches". It is sung to the tune of "The Teddy Bears' Picnic" (1907). The villains plan to dispose of the anonymous cartoonist, while Beans comes to the rescue. Beans is in effect rescuing his own creator. The cartoonist rewards him by drawing some ice cream and allowing the cat to enjoy it.

The film's setting is an animated cartoon studio. Samerdyke notes that the building is depicted in a state of severe disrepair. It somewhat resembles a prison. Samerdyke speculates that these elements of the film could reflect the actual working conditions of the animators employed by Leon Schlesinger. The film features interactions between a cartoonist and a living, sentient cartoon character (Beans). In this way it resembles (and foreshadows) Duck Amuck (1953) and Who Framed Roger Rabbit (1988).

Terry Lindvall and Matthew Melton have included this film in an analysis of reflexive cartoons, those whose narrative reveals something about the art of animation and filmmaking. The writers find that Jack King's A Cartoonist's Nightmare clearly draws a portrait of what animators feel about their craft. The opening scenes are telling. The scenes of the staff leaving the animation resemble crazy people leaving an asylum. The wife of the cartoonist attempts to pull him away from his work and fails. He is obsessively devoted to his work and claims that he has to "finish tonight". He eventually falls asleep at his own drawing board.

The cartoonist is pulled into the cartoon by a wicked character of his own creation. Lindvall and Melton find this scene to resemble a segment of Twilight Zone: The Movie (1983), "It's a Good Life" directed by Joe Dante. In this segment a live-action character is incarcerated in a cartoon television program. As the villain (described as a "hairy monster" by the writers), drags the captive cartoonist through the corridors of the studio, various sections are seen. Among them a gag department, a story department, a music department. The cartoon villains occupy a dungeon-like section of their own.

Regarding the depiction of the other villains, each has been assigned a number of their own. For example, "Battling Barney" is #20 and "Dirty Dan" is #130. These characters have apparently been created by the cartoonist, products of his imagination. And they have reasons to resent him. They sing to him: "It's our turn. Now you are in our clutches! We are creations from your pen, it's in your hands we lie; you always manage to have us sin, now by your own hand you die." The characters blame their creator for causing them to commit sins. They seem to argue that they are not inherently bad people, they have been drawn that way. A sentiment echoed in another film by Jessica Rabbit.

== Home media ==
The short was released on Disc 3 of the Looney Tunes Golden Collection: Volume 6 DVD set.

== Sources ==
- Lindvall, Terry; Melton, Matthew (2012), "Toward a Postmodern Animated Discourse: Bakhtin, Intertextuality and the Cartoon Carnival", in Furniss, Maureen (ed.), Animation: Art and Industry, John Libbey Publishing, ISBN 978-0861969043
- Samerdyke, Michael (2013), "1935", Cartoon Carnival: A Critical Guide to the Best Cartoons from Warner Brothers, MGM, Walter Lantz and DePatie-Freleng, Lulu Press, Inc, ISBN 978-1312470071
