= Plane Dippy =

1936 film by Fred Avery

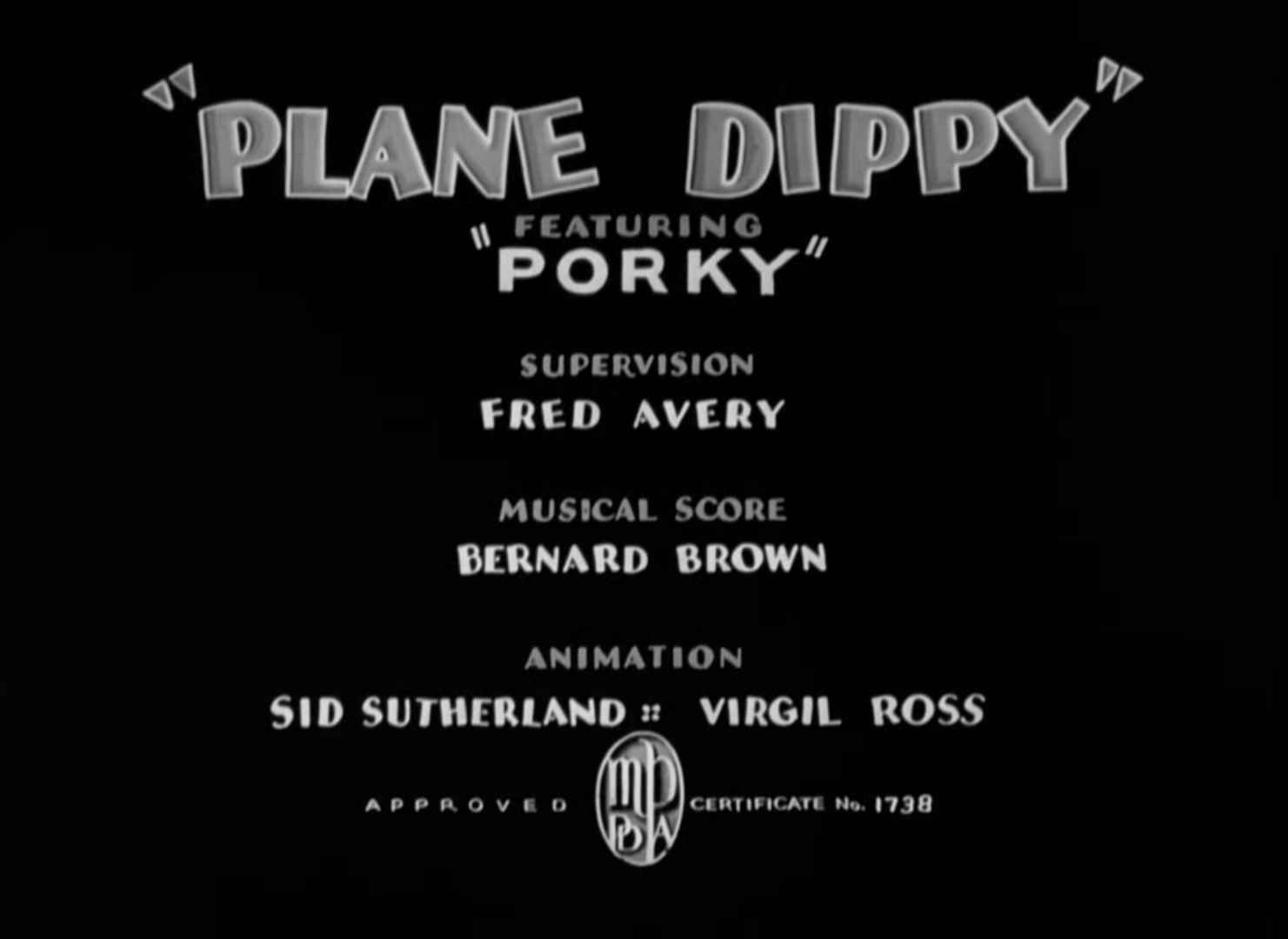
- Title card
- Directed by: Fred Avery
- Produced by: Leon Schlesinger
- Starring: Billy Bletcher; Joe Dougherty; Jack King; Bernice Hansen
- Music by: Bernard Brown
- Animation by: Sid Sutherland; Virgil Ross
- Color process: Black-and-white
- Production company: Leon Schlesinger Productions
- Distributed by: Warner Bros. Productions; The Vitaphone Corporation
- Release date: April 30, 1936
- Running time: 8 minutes
- Country: United States
- Language: English

Plane Dippy is a 1936 American animated comedy short film directed by Fred Avery. The short was released on April 30, 1936. It is the 70th film in the Looney Tunes series, the seventh cartoon to feature Porky Pig, and the eighth and final cartoon to feature Beans. It is the first film in the series to credit Virgil Ross, who would become one of the most prominent animators in the series.

== Plot ==
Porky is looking to join the military. He briefly considers the Army's infantry division and the Navy, refusing because of his obesity and limited physical ability, before deciding to join the Air Corps. When the recruiter asks Porky for his name, he is unable to say it in time due to his stuttering, so he writes "P-P-P-P-P-P-P-P-P-P-P-P-P" on the chalkboard that was given to him by the recruiter, which he then drops it on the floor and says his actual name, "Porky Cornelius Washington Otis Lincoln Abner Aloysius Casper Jefferson Philbert Horatius Narcissus Pig". He is approved and is sent to the dressing room, where the outfit only fits him after he is soaked in water.

Porky first partakes in a dizziness test, which he is spun like a top and is instructed to be guided along a line drawn by Beans, which he fails to do so. He then partakes in a target practice, where he is instructed to shoot a flying miniature plane. He shoots everything in the room but the plane at first, but manages to succeed at the last second, and is declared ready for duty.

Porky is assigned a feather dust to help test a robot plane invented by Professor Blotz, which is operated through voice commands. After testing it out and verifying that it works with his stuttering, he is ordered to clean the plane. Unfortunately, Little Kitty plays with a friend and his puppy near the speaker, despite it being a restricted military base. Her commands to the puppy ultimately convince the plane to follow suit, including popping a military balloon, destroying a building and catching two trapeze artists in a circus. The trapeze artists then water ski across the ocean while the plane chases a fish in the ocean. More children watch as the puppy's tricks leads to the plane crashing multiple other planes and blimps. The plane chases a cloud man which escapes into his cloud house, whose door is solid enough to cause the plane to return to the ground and graze hay into straw hats. The plane does multiple tricks until the dog passes out from exhaustion. Having had enough, Porky wastes no time to switch to the infantry division, where he realizes that he is in fact fit enough to march in formation.

== Home media ==
Plane Dippy is available on disc 1 of the Porky Pig 101 DVD set.

== See also ==
- Porky Pig filmography
- Looney Tunes and Merrie Melodies filmography (1930–1939)
