= Boom Boom (film) =

1936 film by Jack King

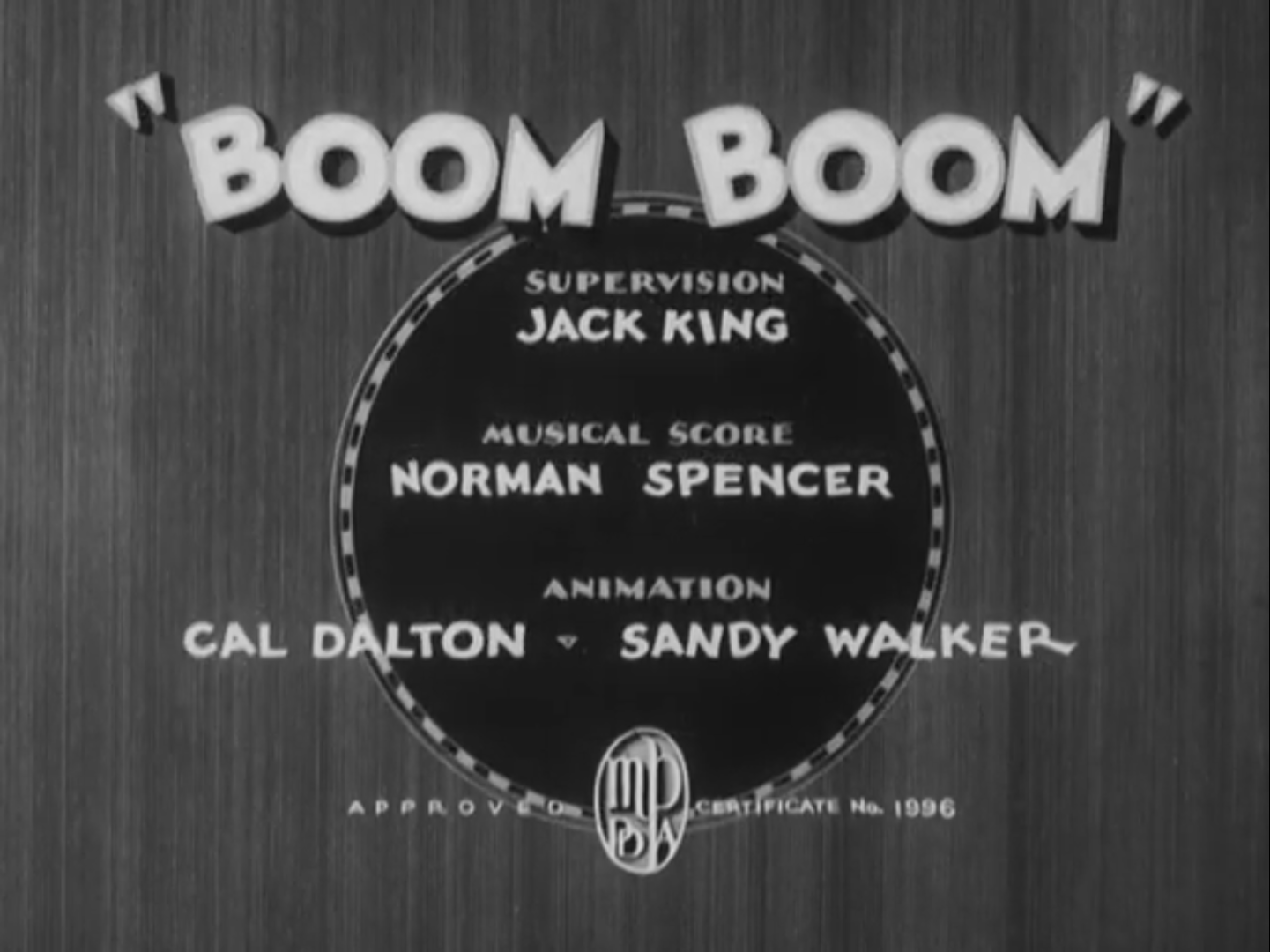
- Title card
- Directed by: Jack King
- Produced by: Leon Schlesinger
- Starring: Tommy Bond (uncredited); Joe Dougherty (uncredited); Billy Bletcher (uncredited); Tedd Pierce (uncredited)
- Music by: Norman Spencer
- Animation by: Cal Dalton; Sandy Walker
- Color process: Black-and-white
- Production company: Leon Schlesinger Productions
- Distributed by: Warner Bros. Productions; The Vitaphone Corporation
- Release date: February 29, 1936
- Running time: 8 minutes
- Country: United States
- Language: English

Boom Boom is a 1936 American animated comedy short film directed by Jack King. It is the 65th film in the Looney Tunes series and the fifth cartoon to star Beans, as well as the third to feature Porky Pig. The film is in the public domain after Warner Bros. Pictures failed to renew the copyright in 1964.

== Plot ==
At a battlefield, a trumpeter is killed while sounding an alarm while a mini gunner is hit on the head. A horse soldier is hit repeatedly by a bombshell, which shreds his backpack, his helmet which then traps his hand, as well as a house he hides in. He plays an instrument in the house, only to be killed in the explosion too. A soldier repeatedly shoots a keg into his eye while another neglects to throw a grenade and is thrown into an enemy van.

Elsewhere, Porky Pig leads his unit, not noticing his peers immediately leaving after setting off a land mine without issue. He sneaks a short distance before realizing and returning without his rifle. He rushes under Beans' bed, who reassures him, while the other soldiers mock him for his cowardice. Beans goads him to come out by eating some baked beans.

They eat together, only for a dying pigeon soldier to deliver a note from General Hardtack, who is imprisoned in an old farmhouse by the enemy. Beans finds a vehicle and seemingly abandons Porky, only to rush him from behind and take him into the vehicle, as they are chased by a bombshell. The vehicle splits into a bike and sidecar as they pass through a house, and they are thrown out near some holes. They hide in a hole while the bombshell, predicting their location, explodes at their landing spot instead. Realizing their advantage, they physically move the hole like a cloth and hide in it to avoid bombings.

The duo arrive at the farmhouse where the general is being tortured by having his soles burnt by a lighter. Beans saves him by using a rocket and tripwire to trap his captors. They escape on a plane, which is grazed by gunfire and crash lands. They are saved by allies in a hospital, where they share a bed. As thanks, Hardtack gives Beans a badge which he splits with Porky as they celebrate their victory.

== Home media ==
Boom Boom is available on disc 1 of the Porky Pig 101 DVD set.

== See also ==
- Porky Pig filmography
- Looney Tunes and Merrie Melodies filmography (1930–1939)
- List of animated films in the public domain in the United States
