= Hollywood Capers =

1935 film by Jack King

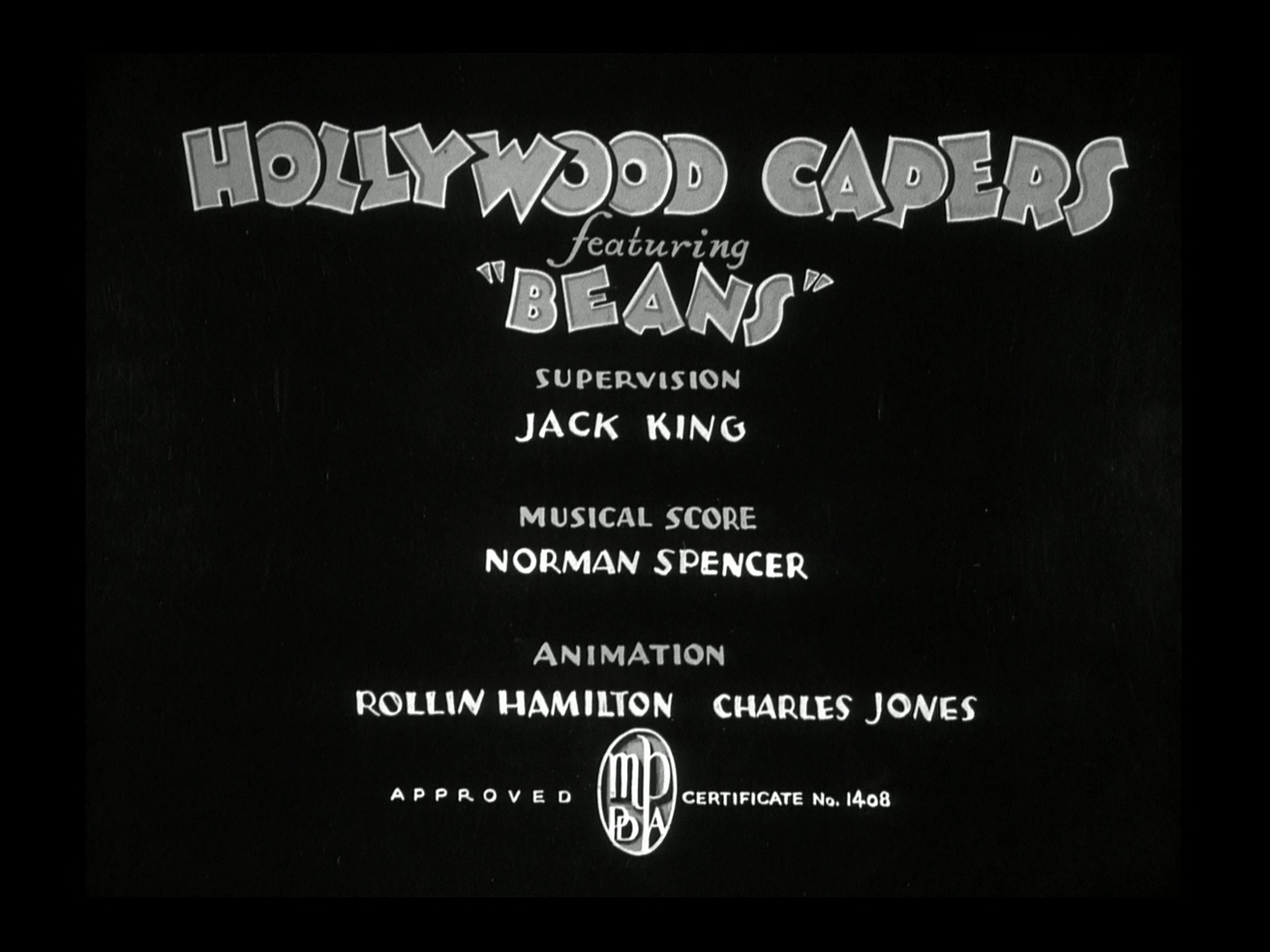
- Title card
- Directed by: Jack King
- Produced by: Leon Schlesinger
- Starring: Tommy Bond; Bernice Hansen; Billy Bletcher
- Music by: Norman Spencer
- Animation by: Rollin Hamilton; Charles Jones
- Color process: Black-and-white
- Production company: Leon Schlesinger Productions
- Distributed by: Warner Bros. Productions; The Vitaphone Corporation
- Release date: October 19, 1935
- Running time: 7 minutes
- Country: United States
- Language: English

Hollywood Capers is a 1935 American animated comedy short film directed by Jack King. It was released on October 19, 1935. It is the 62nd film in the Looney Tunes series and the second cartoon to star Beans. The film is in the public domain after Warner Bros. Pictures failed to renew the copyright in 1963.

== Plot ==
It is a normal day at Warmer Brothers Studios in Hollywood. A caricature of W. C. Fields gives a cigar to a guard, and after failing to light it, takes it back. Beans attempts to enter the studio, but his car is sent flying into a tree, causing it to explode. While a caricature of Charlie Chaplin enters, Beans disguises himself as Oliver Hardy, and passes through the gate without causing suspicion.

Taking off his cover, Beans enters a sound stage where Oliver Owl is directing a film. Looking from a catwalk, Beans watches Little Kitty perform a musical number with numerous individuals, including a talented turtle piano player. During a scene where she rebuffs an actor's pursuits, Beans falls on top of the actor, much to the annoyance of Oliver, who tosses Beans away. Beans enters a scene room where a Frankenstein-like robot is on the table. While he fearfully moves back, the cat lands on a switch. As a result, the robot activates and rises.

The robot goes on a rampage and everyone flees the studio. Beans tries to whack it with an iron bar, but the robot is very sturdy and throws him across the sound stage. When Beans lands next to a giant fan, he turns it on, generating a strong wind towards the robot. The robot resists the draft, but walks straight into the fan and gets smashed to pieces.

== Home media ==
The short was released on disc 2 of the Looney Tunes Golden Collection: Volume 3 DVD set.

== See also ==
- Porky Pig filmography
- Looney Tunes and Merrie Melodies filmography (1930–1939)
- List of animated films in the public domain in the United States
