= Beans (Looney Tunes) =

Warner Bros. theatrical cartoon character

- Looney Tunes/Merrie Melodies character
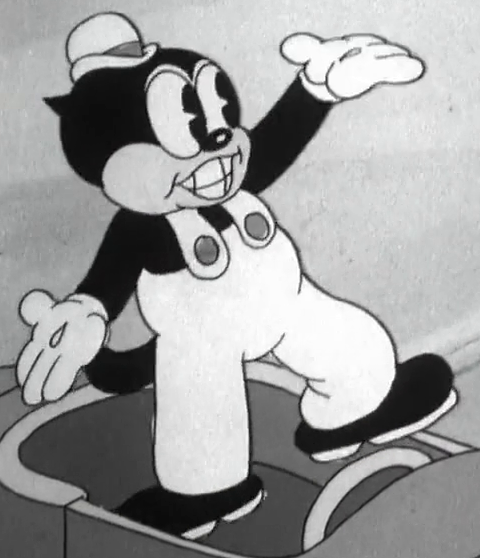
- Beans in Hollywood Capers
- First appearance: I Haven't Got a Hat (1935)
- Last appearance: Westward Whoa (1936)
- Created by: Friz Freleng
- Voiced by: Billy Bletcher (1935); Tommy Bond (1935–1936)

In-universe information
- Species: Cat
- Gender: Male
- Significant other: Little Kitty

Beans is an animated cartoon character in the Looney Tunes and Merrie Melodies series of cartoons from 1935–1936. Beans was the third cartoon character star of the series after Bosko and Buddy. He was created by director Friz Freleng alongside a plethora of characters intended to be his supporting cast, including Porky Pig. He was voiced by Billy Bletcher (and occasionally by Tommy Bond). The character was featured in nine cartoons made in 1935 and 1936, but was retired quickly in favor of Porky Pig.

== History ==
In 1933, directors Hugh Harman and Rudolf Ising left producer Leon Schlesinger for Metro-Goldwyn-Mayer, taking their main creation, Bosko, with them. Desperate to maintain his contract with Warner Bros. Pictures, Schlesinger founded an animation studio of his own, Leon Schlesinger Productions, to produce new Looney Tunes and Merrie Melodies cartoons in-house and collected employees from Walt Disney Productions, Romer Grey's animation studio and their competitors. Schlesinger set up his new studio on the Warner Bros. lot, on Sunset Boulevard. Among the staff Schlesinger had accrued was Tom Palmer, a former Disney animator who was appointed director of Looney Tunes and Merrie Melodies. Palmet was instructed to create a star character similar to Bosko, ignorer to compete with him, Mickey Mouse and Betty Boop. Palmer's creation, Buddy, was basically indistinguishable from Bosko outside of appearance. Buddy's cartoons were not popular and he was canned after two years.

By 1934, Schlesinger had assigned directorial duties on the Merrie Melodies series to former Harman-Ising animator Friz Freleng, and the Looney Tunes series to Jack King. Schlesinger tasked the two with creating new characters to replace the sterile Buddy, and the two created a group of anthropomorphic animals to show to Schlesinger, which included Beans, a mischievous cat, Little Kitty, a female cat and Beans' love interest, twin puppies named Ham and Ex, Oliver Owl, a stubborn, spectacled owl, and Porky Pig, a stuttering pig. Beans and his friends made their first appearances in I Haven't Got a Hat, a Merrie Melodies animated short directed by Freleng. They were popular enough to be introduced in the Looney Tunes series through Hollywood Capers, after which Oliver Owl was retired out of unpopularity. Beans received solo credit for the first time in A Cartoonist's Nightmare. The fourth cartoon starring Beans, Gold Diggers of '49 (1935), helped launch Tex Avery's career after he left Universal Pictures. Avery preferred Porky as a character and refined him in future films, while Beans remained a staple of Jack King's cartoons; he never caught on due to his personality being near-verbatim to Buddy's. He last appeared in Westward Whoa (1936) and was retired after King left for Disney.

== Filmography ==
Title	Release date
I Haven't Got a Hat	March 2, 1935
The Country Mouse (cameo)	July 13, 1935
A Cartoonist's Nightmare	September 21, 1935
Hollywood Capers	October 19, 1935
Gold Diggers of '49	November 2, 1935
Alpine Antics	January 18, 1936
The Phantom Ship	February 1, 1936
Boom Boom	February 29, 1936
The Fire Alarm	March 9, 1936
Westward Whoa	April 25, 1936
Plane Dippy (cameo)	April 30, 1936
Space Jam (picture cameo)	November 15, 1996
The Day the Earth Blew Up: A Looney Tunes Movie (picture cameo)	March 14, 2025
