= Little Beau Porky =

1936 film by Frank Tash

- Title card
- Directed by: Frank Tash
- Produced by: Leon Schlesinger
- Starring: Billy Bletcher; Joe Dougherty
- Music by: Carl W. Stalling
- Animation by: Robert Bentley; Nelson Demorest
- Color process: Black-and-white
- Production company: Leon Schlesinger Productions
- Distributed by: Warner Bros. Productions; The Vitaphone Corporation
- Release date: November 14, 1936
- Running time: 8 min
- Country: United States
- Language: English

Little Beau Porky is a 1936 American animated comedy short film directed by Frank Tash. The short was released on November 14, 1936. It is the 77th film in the Looney Tunes series and the fifteenth cartoon to feature Porky Pig.

== Plot ==
In an Arabian Desert fortress belonging to the French Foreign Legion, Porky is confronted by his Commandant, who orders him to march behind him. He unknowingly hits Porky with his sword hilt, and during an attempt by Porky to mock him, Porky walks on the hilt while the Commandant stops. He is ordered to wash the Camel, who quickly moves to avoid Porky much to his chagrin. When the Commandant receives news of an attack by Ali Mode's Riff Raffs on a nearby village, he orders everyone to attack except for Porky.

Feeling disheartened, Porky encounters a Wanted poster of Ali Mode and is frightened into defending the fortress. Elsewhere, Ali Mode notices the nearly empty fortress and conveniently decides to sneak inside. After a heated exchange of words, Ali Mode orders his soldiers to dig their way in, which Porky subdues by felling a long Date palm A gunman shoots stairs as Porky runs up to a guard tower, using a minigun to shoot the gunman, who falls into a well and incapacitates another with the bucket. Multiple attempts of sneak attacks by Ali Oop end with Porky falling out while trying to cover the stairs, causing Ali Oop to fall into the camel, who throws him into a barrel of "Cairo syrup", trapping him as he is licked. Porky is promoted to Commandant while the camel is promoted to a lesser role as thanks for their bravery.

== Home media ==
- DVD – Looney Tunes Golden Collection: Volume 4, Disc 2
- DVD – Porky Pig 101, Disc 1

== See also ==
- Porky Pig filmography
- Looney Tunes and Merrie Melodies filmography (1930–1939)
