= Bugs Bunny's Overtures to Disaster =

1991 TV special

- VHS Cover
- Story by: Greg Ford; Terry Lennon
- Directed by: Greg Ford; Terry Lennon
- Starring: Mel Blanc; Arthur Q. Bryan; Jeff Bergman; June Foray; Stan Freberg
- Music by: Carl W. Stalling; Milt Franklyn
- Country of origin: United States
- Original language: English

Production
- Production company: Warner Bros. Cartoons

Original release
- Network: CBS
- Release: April 17, 1991

Bugs Bunny's Overtures to Disaster is a Looney Tunes television special directed by Greg Ford and Terry Lennon. In new animation, Jeff Bergman voiced Bugs Bunny, Daffy Duck, Porky Pig, Elmer Fudd and Sylvester. The special first aired on April 17, 1991 on CBS.

== Shorts used ==
- "Baton Bunny"
- "Tree for Two" (audio clip used when Sylvester the Cat sings "Charleston" as interruption)
- "Daffy Duck and Porky Pig in The William Tell Overture" (originally produced for this special and also later released as a standalone short)
- "Back Alley Oproar" (audio clip used when Sylvester tries to ruin Elmer's Hungarian Rhapsody)
- "Rabbit of Seville"
- "What's Opera, Doc?"
- "Long-Haired Hare" (audio clip of "Leopold's" conducting used in the credits)

== Plot ==
While reading the newspaper, The Three Bears decide to go to the opera. Also seen in the paper is the headline Experimental Fly escapes, cannot be killed.

After a clip from Baton Bunny of the audience walking in, Bugs Bunny emerges from his dressing room and begins to conduct. In the audience, the fly lands on Papa Bear's head; Baby Bear tries to squash it with his toy wagon, but only succeeds in knocking Papa unconscious. The fly flies up to Bugs, whose conducting is ruined.

Elmer Fudd starts practicing for the Hungarian Rhapsody No. 2 and gets interrupted by Sylvester the Cat singing "Charleston" before scaring him away with his anger. In the audience, Granny tries to kill the fly with bug spray, but the fly wears a gas mask. Porky Pig starts playing the William Tell Overture before Daffy Duck. Daffy is angered, and a fight ensues. The Lone Ranger and his horse Silver come in when the music is over.

Elmer Fudd is up, and Sylvester continues singing. In effect, Elmer decides to throw Sylvester out. Elmer starts to conduct "Hungarian Rhapsody No. 2" when Sylvester runs up and down the stairs singing the same tune. Elmer beats up Sylvester and walks back in, but sees that the audience loved Sylvester's act. Elmer quits, declaring that he has been "humiwiated fow the wast time and is leaving show business for good." In the audience, Mr. Meek tries to kill the fly with a flyswatter, but the fly swats him back on the nose.

Bugs introduces The Barber of Seville when Porky informs him that Elmer quit. Bugs tricks him back onto the set, performing Rabbit of Seville. Bugs then tells him how they loved it and changes him into his Wagnerian warrior costume. Bugs tells him he'll like the next one because he gets to kill Bugs. They perform What's Opera, Doc? In the audience, Petunia Pig shoos the fly off her binoculars; Yosemite Sam tries to kill the fly with his gun, but fails.

Bugs then takes another shot at conducting, unaware that the fly has driven the audience away. Bugs eventually succeeds in knocking the fly out cold, but when he sees the audience empty, he notices that the fly claps as Bugs shrugs and finally bows.

== Voice Characterizations ==
- Mel Blanc - Bugs Bunny (archive footage)
- Arthur Q. Bryan - Elmer Fudd (archive footage)
- Jeff Bergman - Bugs Bunny, Daffy Duck, Porky Pig, Elmer Fudd, Yosemite Sam, Sylvester and Papa Bear
- June Foray - Mama Bear
- Stan Freberg - Junior Bear

== Trivia ==
- Sylvester's Hungarian Rhapsody from Back Alley Oproar is reused here, with new animation because while Warner/Chappell Music held the rights to the music in the cartoon, Turner Entertainment Co. (through the 1956 a.a.p. sale and various mergers) owned the rights to the footage at the time (Warner would not regain the rights until 1996, despite the studio having the cartoon's original negatives stored in the WB vault).
- Mr. Meek from The Wise Quacking Duck, the two stranded men from Wackiki Wabbit, and Granny and Sam from Hare Trimmed make cameos in the audience.
