= Porky's Romance =

1937 film by Frank Tash

- Title card
- Directed by: Frank Tash
- Produced by: Leon Schlesinger
- Starring: Joe Dougherty; Shirley Reed; Mel Blanc
- Narrated by: Alan Reed
- Music by: Carl W. Stalling
- Animation by: Robert Bentley; Joe D'Igalo
- Color process: Black-and-white
- Production company: Leon Schlesinger Productions
- Distributed by: Warner Bros. Productions; The Vitaphone Corporation
- Release date: April 3, 1937
- Running time: 7 min
- Country: United States
- Language: English

Porky's Romance is a 1937 American animated comedy short film directed by Frank Tashlin, credited here as Frank Tash. The short was released on April 3, 1937. It is the 83rd film in the Looney Tunes series, the 21st cartoon to feature Porky Pig, the first to feature Petunia Pig and the final cartoon to have Joe Dougherty voice Porky, before he was fired due to his uncontrollable stuttering and replaced with Mel Blanc.

== Plot ==
Petunia Pig is introduced in an audition at Leon Schlesinger Productions. Petunia nervously trips on her lines, leading an off-screen announcer (voiced by Alan Reed) to quietly tell her not to get excited. This causes her to go into an explosive rant as the curtain closes.

Porky is shown buying a diamond ring, some candy and flowers to please Petunia. Petunia rejects his advances, only for her dog, Fluffnums, to alert her of Porky's candy. She notices the candy and pulls a confused Porky back in; she only pays attention to the candy while Porky earns the ire of Fluffnums by trying to take one, which Fluffnums then eats. Even when Porky proposes to her, she pays no attention until Fluffnums sabotages Porky by tripping him with the carpet.

Porky leaves sadly and attempts suicide by hanging, only for his weight to collapse the tree branch holding the noose, which nevertheless knocks him out. In his dream, he marries Petunia and has a successful honeymoon at a hotel. Despite this, he is delegated all the housework while Petunia becomes a couch potato, eating candy with Fluffnums all day to the point they become morbidly obese. As Porky struggles with the housework, he is made to handle his children (all named Porky Pig Jr.), only to be beat by Petunia to the cheers of his children.

Porky wakes up to find Petunia, who had come upon him while unconscious and apologizes for her behavior. However, Porky recognizes Petunia to be a poor choice of a partner and runs away, but not before he returns to collect his belongings and kick Fluffnums in the back.

== Home media ==
The short was released on disc 3 of the Looney Tunes Golden Collection: Volume 3 DVD set, and on disc 2 of the Porky Pig 101 DVD set.

== See also ==
- Porky Pig filmography
- Looney Tunes and Merrie Melodies filmography (1930–1939)
