= Petunia Pig =

Warner Bros. theatrical cartoon character

- Looney Tunes/Merrie Melodies character
- Bob Clampett's redesign of Petunia Pig
- First appearance: Porky's Romance (1937)
- Created by: Frank Tashlin
- Voiced by: Shirley Reed (1937–1939); Mel Blanc (1937, 1973–1974); Bonnie Baker (1948); Gilbert Mack (1955); Jay Scheimer (1972); June Foray (1976–1982); Sonia Manzano (1978); Vera Baudey (1984); Desirée Goyette (various Six Flags stage shows; 1980s); Kathleen Helppie-Shipley (1986-1993); Grey DeLisle (2001–2004); Chiara Zanni (Baby Looney Tunes; 2002–2005); Jodi Benson (2004); Katy Mixon (2013); Jessica DiCicco (2019); Eric Bauza (2018); Lara Jill Miller (2021–2023); Alex Cazares (2022–present); Candi Milo (2024)
- Developed by: Bob Clampett; David Gemmill; Caroline Director

In-universe information
- Species: Domestic pig
- Gender: Female
- Significant other: Porky Pig

Petunia Pig is a cartoon character in the Looney Tunes and Merrie Melodies series of cartoons from Warner Bros. She looks much like her significant other, Porky Pig, except that she wears a dress and (since 1939) has pigtailed black hair.

== Biography ==
Petunia was introduced by Frank Tashlin in the 1937 short Porky's Romance. Petunia is depicted as an unsubtle parody of Minnie Mouse who treats Porky like a pushover; Tashlin went as far as pairing her with Fluffnums, her malicious pet Pekingese who is a caricature of Minnie's pet Fifi the Peke. The film is a parody of Mickey's Nightmare, where Mickey Mouse dreams of a marriage with Minnie Mouse made difficult by dozens of annoying kids, an ordeal Porky also suffers through in his nightmare. Tashlin featured her in two more cartoons: The Case of the Stuttering Pig (where she is depicted as Porky's sister) and Porky's Double Trouble, both in 1937.

After Tashlin left the studio in 1938, Bob Clampett, under management by Ray Katz, redesigned Petunia to complement Porky's new look, giving her pigtailed hair while toning down her undesirable personality for the redesign. Clampett first featured her in Porky's Picnic, a 1939 film that sees Porky tormented by his nephew Pinky. Petunia's largest role came in Clampett's 1939 short Naughty Neighbors, where she is depicted as Porky's love interest. Petunia was retired soon after due to her relative unpopularity.

Although Petunia made only a handful of appearances in Warner Bros. cartoons, she continued to appear frequently in Warner's merchandising, with a major presence in comic books for the entire 1941–1984 run of Western Publishing (Dell, Gold Key and Whitman Comics) Looney Tunes and Merrie Melodies comics, Porky Pig, Bugs Bunny and various other titles. Often featured in Porky's stories, she sometimes co-starred with Bugs Bunny and occasionally had a story of her own. Pinky, renamed "Cicero" for the comic books, was depicted as being Petunia's young cousin as well as Porky's nephew. Petunia was portrayed in the comics as a determined, bossy, and occasionally pretentious character, similar to the early Tashlin depiction, though with a genuine affection towards Porky. In early years, she was often rivals with Bugs, who enjoyed pranking and humbling her.

== Later appearances ==
Despite her unpopularity in the classic era, in modern years Petunia has appeared in multiple new roles:

- Petunia has a co-starring role in Filmation's lone Looney Tunes-related production, Daffy Duck and Porky Pig Meet the Groovie Goolies, in 1972. She is voiced by Jay Scheimer, the wife of Filmation co-founder and Warner alumnus Lou Scheimer.
- Petunia made a cameo appearance in the 1979 short Bugs Bunny's Christmas Carol as Mrs. Cratchit, wife of Bob Cratchit (played by Porky Pig), though she had no speaking lines.
- Petunia was intended to make a cameo appearance with Porky in the 1988 film Who Framed Roger Rabbit in the deleted scene "Acme's Funeral". In that deleted scene, she appears with other animated characters scared when Casper appears at the funeral.
- Petunia made a cameo appearance as an audience member in Bugs Bunny's Overtures to Disaster, where she shoos a fly off with her binoculars.
- Petunia made a cameo appearance in Tiny Toon Adventures in the episode "It's a Wonderful Tiny Toon Christmas Special".
- An infant version of Petunia was a recurring character in the Baby Looney Tunes television series, where she was voiced by Chiara Zanni.
- The regular adult Petunia is an occasional guest star in DC's Looney Tunes comic book and appeared frequently in 2001-2005 webtoons on the official Looney Tunes website.
- She also turned up in Duck Dodgers, playing the role of Princess Incense (voiced by Jodi Benson).
- Petunia appeared on The Looney Tunes Show in the episodes "Here Comes the Pig" and "Mr. Wiener", voiced by Katy Mixon in the latter episode.
- Petunia is a playable character in the mobile game "Looney Tunes: World of Mayhem", along with Farmer, Lunar, and Athena variants of herself.
- Petunia appears in several New Looney Tunes segments, voiced by Jessica DiCicco.
- Petunia also appears in Looney Tunes Cartoons, voiced by Lara Jill Miller, which for the first time she has a solo appearance. In this portrayal, she has a Brooklyn accent similar to Bugs Bunny.
- Petunia appears in Bugs Bunny Builders, voiced by Alex Cazares.
- A new redesign of Petunia appears in the 2024 film The Day the Earth Blew Up, voiced by Candi Milo, as a flavor scientist working for a gum factory who helps Porky Pig and Daffy Duck against an alien invasion.
