= Count Cutelli =

Italian-American nobleman, sound effects specialist, and voice actor

- Born: Gaetano Mazzaglia dei Conti Cutelli; January 1, 1889; Catania, Sicily, Italy
- Died: July 16, 1944 (aged 55); Seattle, Washington, U.S.
- Occupation: Sound effects producer
- Children: 2; including Rosanna

Gaetano Mazzaglia dei Conti Cutelli (January 1, 1889 – July 16, 1944), better known as Count Tano Cutelli, was an Italian-American nobleman and sound effects specialist for television and Hollywood films during the 1920s and '30s, and worked for companies including Disney and Looney Tunes. In his career, he received the nickname "The Big Noise" for the 2000 or so sound effects that he could create with his voice.

== Early life ==
Gaetano Mazzaglia dei Conti Cutelli was born in Sicily, and grew up on his father's estate near Mount Etna. He was raised as a nobleman within the Italian aristocracy. One of his first jobs was as a sea-captain, and during the First World War, he fought for the Italian Army on the African front.

== Stage and screen career ==
Cutelli started his career as a stage actor, performing in European vaudeville venues—specifically in Palermo. He moved to Hollywood in the early 1920s in order to begin performing in early "talkie" motion pictures. His first contact in the film world was with the manager of Gloria Swanson, who had heard Cutelli's impressions during his early radio work. He was asked to do a screen test for his imitation of a crying baby, and soon after began doing film work. From there, he became a pioneer in the creation of sound effects in both film and radio. By 1929, his career in the movies was the subject of an article by The New York Times. He immigrated to the United States in 1930, settling in Los Angeles, and became a naturalized citizen a decade later.

Cutelli was able to produce more than 2,000 sound effects from his throat, including a large variety of different animals, mechanical noises (like air plane squadrons), and weather effects (like howling winds or sea waves crashing on the shore). From these skills, he earned the nickname "The Big Noise", and began to invent various mechanical devices for the replication of similar sounds for radio and film. In many cases he would personally install the devices, which were used in both the US and many European countries. He also worked closely with Leon Schlesinger to hold seminars on the subject matter. For example, in 1935 he developed and installed the noise machines for WGN in Chicago. These devices were generally much smaller and cheaper than those used previously. He also developed techniques for the creation of other noises, such as rain, used in the media industry. During his work, Cutelli acted as the supervisor of sound effects for several early Hollywood studios.

=== Roles ===
Films that his voice work was featured in included The Trespasser, The Love Parade, and Condemned, and he voiced the crying baby Abraham Lincoln in the 1930 film Abraham Lincoln. Another role that Cutelli did was providing the additional lines for Porky Pig after his original voice actor Joe Dougherty could not control his stuttering issues, including hiccups and whistling. In 1937, Dougherty was replaced by Mel Blanc as the voice of Porky, in which Blanc would continue voicing Porky until his death in 1989.

== Death ==
Cutelli died of a heart attack on July 16, 1944, while waiting for a train in Seattle. Upon his death, the Chicago Tribune called him the "Genius of Sound Effects". After his death, The Berlin Anthropological Institute offered $2,000 to purchase Cutelli's head so that it could be studied for his sound effects ability. The request was declined by the family.

== Anniversary ==
Celebrating Mickey Mouse's 90th birthday year in 2018, the newspaper il Mattino published a story of remembrance.
