= Joe Dougherty =

American actor (1898–1978)

- Born: Joseph Tapley Dougherty; November 4, 1898; Missouri, U.S.
- Died: April 19, 1978 (aged 79); Los Angeles, California, U.S.
- Occupation: Actor
- Years active: 1927–1967

Joseph Tapley Dougherty (November 4, 1898 – April 19, 1978) was an American actor, who provided the original voice of the Warner Bros. animation character, Porky Pig, starting with the character's debut in I Haven't Got a Hat in 1935 through Porky's Romance in 1937. Treg Brown changed his voice for Porky. Due to Dougherty's stutter, Count Cutelli was brought for additional lines due to the length of the audio and budgetary issues.

After that, Mel Blanc took over the role and voiced Porky for 52 years. Dougherty spoke with a natural stutter that became one of the character's trademarks; Dougherty's inability to control his stutter was a factor in the part being recast. According to Friz Freleng, the director of I Haven't Got a Hat, Dougherty would get nervous every time they said cut. Freleng also called the casting for someone who stuttered and they landed on Dougherty.

== Early life and career ==
Dougherty was born in Missouri. Before becoming an actor, Dougherty attended medical school at the University of Nebraska, where he was a member of the Phi Gamma Delta fraternity. When Friz Freleng needed someone who had stuttering issues do the role of Porky Pig, the casting director hired Dougherty. Dougherty would continue voicing the character from 1935 until 1937 when Mel Blanc took over the role of the character presumably because Dougherty could not control his stuttering issues.

Before he was fired, Count Cutelli was brought in to provide the additional lines for Porky. His last ever role was in the TV program Pistols 'n' Petticoats, where he played the role of Floyd Sullivan in one episode before officially retiring.

== Death ==
Dougherty died on April 19, 1978, in Los Angeles, California from a heart attack. He was 79 years old.

== Partial filmography ==
Year	Title	Role	Notes
1935	I Haven't Got a Hat	Porky Pig	
1935	Gold Diggers of '49	Porky Pig	
1936	Boom Boom	Porky Pig	
1936	Westward Whoa	Porky Pig	
1936	Plane Dippy	Porky Pig	
1936	Fish Tales	Porky Pig	
1936	Porky's Pet	Porky Pig	
1936	Porky's Poultry Plant	Porky Pig	
1936	Milk and Money	Porky Pig	
1936	Little Beau Porky	Porky Pig	
1936	Porky in the North Woods	Porky Pig	
1937	Porky's Romance	Porky Pig	
1938	Berth Quakes	Voices	
1949	Knock on Any Door	Man (uncredited)	on-screen role
1950	Shakedown	Man	on-screen role
1950	Storm Warning	Townsman	on-screen role
1954	A Star Is Born	Makeup Man #3 (uncredited)	on-screen role
1955	East of Eden	Townsman at Carnival	on-screen role
1956	Around the World in 80 Days	Extra (uncredited)	on-screen role
1966	The Loner	Townsman (uncredited)	episode: "A Little Scroll to the End of the Line", also on-screen role
1967	Pistols 'n' Petticoats	Floyd Sullivan	on-screen role; episode: "Harold's Double"
