= The Day the Earth Blew Up =

2024 film by Pete Browngardt

- Theatrical release poster
- Directed by: Pete Browngardt
- Written by: Darrick Bachman; Pete Browngardt; Kevin Costello; Andrew Dickman; David Gemmill; Alex Kirwan; Ryan Kramer; Jason Reicher; Michael Ruocco; Johnny Ryan; Eddie Trigueros
- Starring: Eric Bauza; Candi Milo; Peter MacNicol; Wayne Knight
- Edited by: Nick Simotas
- Music by: Joshua Moshier
- Production company: Warner Bros. Animation
- Distributed by: Ketchup Entertainment
- Release dates: June 11, 2024 (Annecy); March 14, 2025 (United States)
- Running time: 91 minutes
- Country: United States
- Language: English
- Budget: $15 million
- Box office: $15.5 million

The Day the Earth Blew Up (Note: Titled onscreen as Porky Pig & Daffy Duck: The Day the Earth Blew Up, and known in promotional material as The Day the Earth Blew Up: A Looney Tunes Movie.) is a 2024 American animated science fiction comedy film co-written and directed by Pete Browngardt in his feature directorial debut. Produced by Warner Bros. Animation, the film is a spin-off from the Looney Tunes Cartoons series developed by Browngardt, and is the first fully animated and theatrically released film in the Looney Tunes franchise consisting of entirely original material. Featuring the starring voices of Eric Bauza, Candi Milo, and Peter MacNicol, the film follows best friends Daffy Duck and Porky Pig as they try to save Earth from a chewing gum-induced alien mind control plot.

In 2019, while working on Looney Tunes Cartoons, Browngardt was asked if he had any ideas for a new Looney Tunes feature film. Browngardt eventually settled on the premise of a "sci-fi B-movie from the '50s" starring Daffy and Porky. He took inspiration from features of the era and shorts starring the cartoon duo. Warner Bros. Animation, alongside several vendors, provided the animation for the film, of which its character designs were modeled after the style of animator Bob Clampett. Joshua Moshier, who previously worked on Looney Tunes Cartoons, composed the film's score.

Upon its announcement in 2021, The Day the Earth Blew Up was originally set to be released on HBO Max and the "ACME Night" block on Cartoon Network. Instead the film premiered at the Annecy International Animation Film Festival on June 11, 2024, and had a limited release in the United States on December 13, 2024, by Ketchup Entertainment, before expanding wide on March 14, 2025. The film received generally positive reviews from critics and grossed $15.5 million worldwide on a $15 million budget.

== Plot ==
A scientist discovers an asteroid heading towards Earth, but then discovers a UFO hurtling alongside it, only to vanish when he goes outside to investigate.

Years ago, Daffy Duck and Porky Pig were raised by a farmer named Jim, who one day left everything to the duo under the promise that they always stick together. In the present, Daffy and Porky fail a house inspection and are forced to come up with money to repair their home. After being unable to hold a job due to Daffy's antics, the duo come across Petunia Pig, a scientist working at the Goodie Gum factory trying to find the perfect flavor. She offers the two a job at the factory and they accept.

After completing their first shift with no issues, Daffy discovers the scientist pouring green goo into the gum supply. Daffy tries to alert Porky, but he dismisses it as paranoia. Soon enough, the new gum flavor is launched worldwide, and Daffy realizes everyone chewing the gum gets turned into a zombie. He tries to warn the public at the launch party, but nobody believes him and gets himself and Porky fired.

Petunia is asked to investigate a gum sample and discovers an alien invader is responsible for contaminating the gum. The Invader turns the gum into a sentient monster to eliminate the three from thwarting his plans, but they are able to defeat it. Getting an idea, the three conceive a plan to spray people with Petunia's rotten egg extract in order to make them spit out the gum and burn it while in mid-air. Concerned that Daffy will only get in the way, Porky tells him to stay behind and lay eggs in order to produce more extract.

Porky and Petunia are successful, until Daffy decides to step in and try to fight back as well, causing him to accidentally destroy their weapons. Petunia is captured, while Porky and Daffy are abducted by the Invader. With all of Earth's population under his control, the Invader initiates the second step in his plan, which has everyone blow a bubble big enough to encase the entire planet. Daffy and Porky reconcile and escape confinement, managing to free Petunia and the scientist as well and popping the bubble.

However, it turns out the Invader was trying to protect Earth, as the asteroid from earlier is still hurtling towards the planet, and he wanted to use the gum to bounce it away. Remembering Petunia's exploding gum, the three, with the help of the Invader and the scientist, enter a weak spot in the asteroid and place a surplus of the gum by a large crystal, where a surplus of wind-up novelty teeth will chew up the gum. When the teeth are accidentally tipped over, Porky instructs Daffy to go crazy, where his antics cause stalactite crystals to fall and "chew" the gum. However, when the three attempt to escape, Daffy gets stuck, and Porky refuses to leave his side. The asteroid explodes before hitting Earth, and Daffy and Porky are presumed dead.

Whilst everyone on Earth celebrates, the scientist and Petunia discover that Daffy and Porky survived. As Daffy and Porky examine their destroyed house, Porky discovers that, behind a family portrait he saved earlier, Jim left them a $5 million home insurance contract, thus allowing them to rebuild the house. The house inspector returns for a follow-up, only for Porky, Daffy and Petunia to flex their new mansion to her, much to her anger.

== Voice cast ==
- Eric Bauza as Daffy Duck and Porky Pig
- Candi Milo as Petunia Pig and Old Lady
- Peter MacNicol as The Invader
- Fred Tatasciore as Farmer Jim and The Scientist
- Laraine Newman as Mrs. Grecht
- Wayne Knight as the Mayor of Grandview
- Ruth Clampett as Waitress Maude
- Andrew Kishino as Floor Manager
- Kimberly Brooks as The Spaceship Computer / Coffee Shop Customer
- Keith Ferguson as Chewy
- Carlos Alazraqui as A News Anchor / Gary
- Rachel Butera as Town Kid
- Peter Browngardt as Roofer Joe / Bully
- Nick Simotas as Theater Audience Guy / A Flavor Scientist

== Production ==
=== Development ===
In 2019, while working on the series Looney Tunes Cartoons for the streaming service HBO Max, series developer Peter Browngardt was asked if he had any ideas for a new Looney Tunes feature film. After considering several genre settings, Browngardt eventually settled on the premise of a "sci-fi B-movie from the '50s," in the vein of films such as Invasion of the Body Snatchers (1956) and The Day the Earth Stood Still (1951). He also knew he wanted the film to center on Daffy Duck and Porky Pig, acknowledging the characters' previous appearances together in the science fiction-themed Merrie Melodies short films Duck Dodgers (1953) and Rocket Squad (1956).

In September 2021, it was reported that a film based on the Looney Tunes Cartoons series was in development at Warner Bros. Animation, focusing on Daffy Duck and Porky Pig. Kevin Costello, who previously wrote Warner Animation Group's Tom & Jerry released earlier that year, was announced as the writer, with Browngardt serving as an executive producer and director. In addition to Costello and Browngardt, nine storyboard artists worked on the screenplay and ultimately received writing credit.

Eric Bauza voices Daffy and Porky, replacing Bob Bergen for the latter character. Candi Milo replaced Lara Jill Miller as Petunia Pig. Additional starring cast members include Peter MacNicol, Fred Tatasciore, Laraine Newman, and Wayne Knight (Knight had previously starred in Space Jam.)

=== Animation and music ===
Warner Bros. Animation, Tonic DNA, Powerhouse Animation and Snipple Animation worked on the film, with Titmouse, Inc. providing animation for one sequence. The characters' designs were modelled after the style of Looney Tunes animator Bob Clampett, while the design for The Invader, the film's antagonist, was inspired by Invasion of the Saucer Men (1957).

Joshua Moshier, who previously worked on Looney Tunes Cartoons, composed and conducted the film's score. Moshier enjoyed working with Bronwngardt on the project as the director was supportive of his creative choices. Moshier was tasked with translating the sound of the classic Looney Tunes shorts to a "modern cinematic presentation" and exploring the relationship of Daffy and Porky in the themes. The 80-minute score was recorded in Los Angeles with a full orchestra. The soundtrack album was released digitally by WaterTower Music on March 14, 2025, and on vinyl by Enjoy The Ride Records. Plus, popular songs including "Chewy Chewy" by Ohio Express, "(Everything I Do) I Do It For You" by Bryan Adams, and more are used in the film.

== Release ==
The Day the Earth Blew Up was originally set to be released on HBO Max and the "ACME Night" block on Cartoon Network. In August 2022 it was reported that due to a restructuring at Warner Bros. Discovery the film would no longer be released on those channels and that instead would be shopped around to other streaming services. In June 2023, the film was retitled Looney Tunes: Bubble Brains. In October 2023, it was announced that the film would instead be released in theaters in 2024, with the title reverting to the original; GFM Animation launched sales and presented first-look footage at the American Film Market, which ran from October 31 to November 5, 2023.

The film's world premiere took place at the Annecy International Animation Film Festival celebration on June 11, 2024. It was first released theatrically in Germany and Switzerland on August 1, 2024, by Warner Bros. Pictures and Praesens-Film. That same month, it was announced that Ketchup Entertainment acquired North American theatrical distribution rights. The film was screened at the Animation Is Film Festival in Los Angeles on October 19, 2024. Two days prior to the Los Angeles screening, Ketchup scheduled the film's wide theatrical release date in the United States for February 28, 2025. On February 5, 2025, it was revealed that the film's wide release date was pushed back to March 14, 2025. In order for it to be eligible for an Academy Award for Best Animated Feature for the 2024 awards, the film was released in limited theaters in Los Angeles for 7 days starting on December 13 of that year. In Australia, the film was released by Pinnacle Films on March 27, 2025. A 4D version of the film was released on December 23, 2025, at Warner Bros. Movie World's Roxy Theatre. Vertigo Releasing released the film in the UK on February 13, 2026.

=== Marketing ===
The film was promoted during the Warner Bros. Discovery panel at the 2022 San Diego Comic-Con, where the film's original title was unveiled. An early animation clip for the film was released on September 22, 2022. It was shown during the Warner Bros. Animation panel at the Ottawa International Animation Festival.

=== Home media ===
Ketchup Entertainment released the film on DVD and Blu-ray on May 27, 2025, in the United States. In Germany and Switzerland, the film became available on digital retailers on October 28, 2024. The film was later made available on digital retailers in the United States on April 15, 2025. The film was released on HBO Max (where it was initially intended to debut) on June 27, 2025.

== Reception ==
=== Box office ===
The Day the Earth Blew Up: A Looney Tunes Movie grossed $8.9 million in the United States and Canada, and $6.6 million in other territories, for a worldwide total of $15.5 million.

In the United States and Canada, the film expanded wide alongside Black Bag, Opus, The Last Supper, and Novocaine, and was projected to gross around $3 million from 2,827 theaters during the weekend. It met those projections, grossing $3.2 million.

=== Critical response ===
On the review aggregator website Rotten Tomatoes, 86% of 111 critics' reviews are positive. The website's consensus reads: "Restoring much of Looney Tunes' quintessential charm with a daffy dose of high energy and inventive gags, The Day the Earth Blew Up goes to show that these iconic characters remain evergreen fun." Metacritic, which uses a weighted average, assigned the film a score of 68 out of 100, based on 19 critics, indicating "generally favorable" reviews. Audiences polled by CinemaScore gave the film an average grade of "B+" on an A+ to F scale, while those surveyed by PostTrak gave it an 89% overall positive score, with 72% saying they would "definitely recommend" it.

Peter Debruge of Variety praised the film for its comedy and emotional core, and felt that the entire project was "crafted with love and a genuine respect for the franchise". Rafael Motomayor of IGN awarded the film a 9 out of 10-star rating. He praised its comedy, emotional core, animation and Bauza's voice performances, and referred to it as "one of the funniest movies of the year".

Filmmaker Joe Dante, who previously directed the Looney Tunes film Looney Tunes: Back in Action (2003), considered the film a "return to form" to the characters.
