= I Haven't Got a Hat =

1935 film by Isadore Freleng

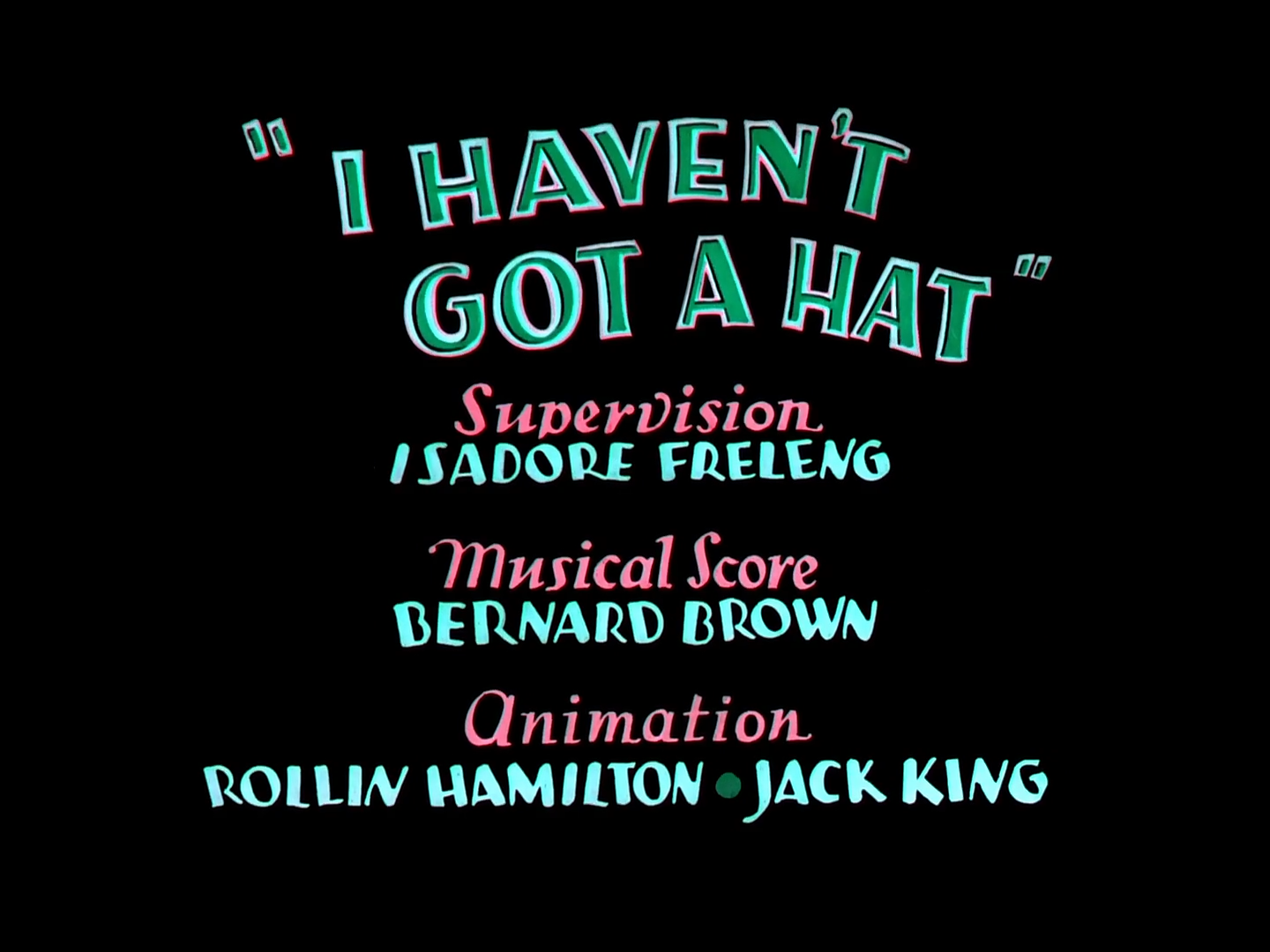
- Title card
- Directed by: Isadore Freleng
- Produced by: Leon Schlesinger
- Music by: Bernard Brown
- Animation by: Rollin Hamilton; Jack King
- Color process: Technicolor
- Production company: Leon Schlesinger Productions
- Distributed by: Warner Bros. Productions; The Vitaphone Corporation
- Release date: March 2, 1935
- Running time: 7 min
- Country: United States
- Language: English

I Haven't Got a Hat is a 1935 animated comedy short film directed by Friz Freleng. It was released on March 2, 1935. It is the 45th film in the Merrie Melodies series. It is notable for featuring the first appearance of future Looney Tunes stars Porky Pig and Beans the Cat, leading to the series to focus on funny animal protagonists instead of human protagonists like Bosko and Buddy.

== Plot ==
The local schoolteacher Miss Cud introduces a school musical and recital. The show begins with a frantically stuttering Porky Pig's dramatic rendition of "Paul Revere's Ride", which ends up with Porky being chased away from friendly stray dogs summoned by his classmates. The show continues on with Little Kitty trying to recite "Mary Had a Little Lamb", but she forgets her lines, despite Miss Cud's attempts to help her out; she speaks increasingly faster and at a higher pitch until the end, after which she rushes to the outhouse. Two puppy twins, Ham and Ex, then sing the titular song without issue, earning them a standing ovation from the audience.

Meanwhile, during the show, Beans the Cat is getting increasingly frustrated by Oliver Owl, who refuses to share a bag of candy with him. Oliver is called to the stage for a piano piece, and he plays a simple beginner's piece. Out for revenge, Beans sneaks outside and places a cat and a passing stray dog inside the piano. Their actions inside the piano causes the piano to play a difficult piece, stunning Oliver, while the audience is oblivious due to the piano obscuring Oliver. Oliver decides to take credit for the accident and expects applause, only for the cat and dog to emerge, causing him to be booed by his classmates. Oliver throws green paint at Beans at the window, who then falls into a plank and launches red paint onto Oliver. The duo make amends.

== Production notes ==
Inspired by the Hal Roach Our Gang live-action shorts, the short introduces several new characters as grade school students in the hope that some would catch on. The stuttering Porky Pig, voiced by Joe Dougherty, who debuts in this cartoon, was the breakout star.

== Home media ==
The short was released on disc 3 of the Looney Tunes Golden Collection: Volume 3 DVD set, and on disc 1 of the Porky Pig 101 DVD set.

== See also ==
- Porky Pig filmography
- Looney Tunes and Merrie Melodies filmography (1930–1939)
