= Bernice Hansen =

American actress

- Born: Berneice Edna Hansell; July 11, 1897; Los Angeles, California, U.S.
- Died: April 16, 1981 (aged 83); Los Angeles, California, U.S.
- Occupation: Voice actress
- Years active: 1934–1942

Berneice Edna Hansell (July 11, 1897 – April 16, 1981), known as Bernice Hansen, was an American voice actress. She was best known for providing the voices for both female and young male characters in the mid to late 1930s for various cartoon studios, most notably Warner Bros. Cartoons, where she played Little Kitty in I Haven't Got a Hat (1935).

== Early life and career ==
Hansell was born in Los Angeles, California on July 11, 1897 to Edward and T. Belle (Carey) Hansell. Her father was an Englishman who arrived in the United States in 1877. Her mother was from Iowa. Edward Hansell worked as a jeweller and then an optician during the 1920s, and as an elevator operator during the Great Depression of the 1930s. Hansell found work as a stenographer and then as a dressmaker on the Warner Bros. lot. She managed to find work in cartoons at the Walt Disney Studios and provided squeaks for Mickey Mouse. That same year, she found work in the Leon Schlesinger Productions and Walter Lantz Productions.

Her animation career ended in the early 1940s. By this point, the small, "cutesy" style characters that had been popular in the 1930s (in which Hansen had specialized) were falling out of fashion; Sara Berner and Bea Benaderet, who had a reputation as more versatile actresses and skilled impersonators, succeeded Hansen as Warner Bros.' primary female voice actresses for much of the 1940s and early 1950s.

Because of a lack of on-screen voice credits on cartoons throughout the 1930s, identifying many actors has been a challenge to historians, resulting in incorrect guesses, especially with many female voices portraying young animals that sound very similar. She has, for example, been incorrectly identified as providing the voice of Sniffles.

== Death ==
Hansell died in Los Angeles on April 16, 1981. She was 83 years old.

== See also ==
- Looney Tunes and Merrie Melodies filmography
  - Looney Tunes and Merrie Melodies filmography (1929–1939)
  - Looney Tunes and Merrie Melodies filmography (1940–1949)
  - Looney Tunes and Merrie Melodies filmography (1950–1959)
  - Looney Tunes and Merrie Melodies filmography (1960–1969)
  - Looney Tunes and Merrie Melodies filmography (1970–present)
