= Porky Pig =

Warner Bros. theatrical cartoon character

- Looney Tunes/Merrie Melodies character
- First appearance: I Haven't Got a Hat (March 2, 1935; 91 years ago)
- Created by: Friz Freleng
- Voiced by: Joe Dougherty (1935–1937); Count Cutelli (1935–1937, additional lines); Mel Blanc (1937–1989); Jeff Bergman (1990–1993, 2002–2004, 2006, 2026); Noel Blanc (1990–1992, 2010); Rob Paulsen (1990, 1993); Bob Bergen (1990–present); Joe Alaskey (1990, 1992, 2000); Greg Burson (1992–1995, 1998); Eric Goldberg (1996); Billy West (1999, 2003–2004); Eric Bauza (2021–2026) (see below)
- Developed by: Tex Avery; Bob Clampett; Chuck Jones; Frank Tashlin

In-universe information
- Species: Pig
- Gender: Male
- Significant other: Petunia Pig
- Relatives: Pinky (nephew); Cicero (nephew); Peta (elder daughter); Priscilla (younger daughter); Pinkster (unspecified descendant)

Porky Pig is a cartoon character in the Warner Bros. Looney Tunes and Merrie Melodies series of cartoons. He was the first character created by the studio to draw audiences based on his star power, and the animators created many critically acclaimed shorts featuring the character. Even after he was supplanted by later characters, Porky continued to be popular with moviegoers, and was recast in numerous everyman and sidekick roles. The character appeared in 153 cartoons in the golden age of American animation.

His signature line, spoken at the end of many shorts, is "(stutter) that's all, folks!" This slogan (without stuttering) was also used by Bosko, Buddy and Beans at the end of Looney Tunes cartoons. Porky is the oldest continuing Looney Tunes character.

Porky has a severe stutter, for which he sometimes compensates by replacing his words; for example, "What's going on?" might become "What's guh-guh-guh-guh— ... what's happening?" Porky's age varied widely in the series; originally conceived as an innocent seven-year-old piglet (explicitly mentioned as such in Porky's Preview), Porky was more frequently cast as an adult, often being cast as the competent straight man in the series in later years.

== Early films ==
The character was introduced in the 100th short, I Haven't Got a Hat (released on March 2, 1935), directed by Friz Freleng. Studio head Leon Schlesinger suggested that Freleng do a cartoon version of the popular Our Gang films. Porky only has a minor role in the film, but the fat little stuttering pig quickly became popular. Porky's name came from two brothers who were childhood classmates of Freleng, nicknamed "Porky" and "Piggy".

Since Hugh Harman and Rudolf Ising had left the studio in 1933, taking the studio's star character Bosko with them, Looney Tunes had been kept afloat by cartoons featuring the bland Buddy. Porky's introduction ushered Buddy out the door and pointed to things to come. Tex Avery was hired by the studio in 1935, and his film Gold Diggers of '49 reused much of the cast from I Haven't Got a Hat, albeit in wildly different roles. Porky transitioned from a shy little boy to an immensely fat adult. Though he was still in a supporting role, Porky got most of the laughs. The directors realized they had a star on their hands.

Porky shared his stutter with his first voice actor, Joe Dougherty. Because Dougherty could not control his stutter, however, production costs became too high as his recording sessions took hours, and Porky's additional lines were done by Count Cutelli. Mel Blanc replaced Dougherty in 1937. Blanc continued the stutter; however, it was harnessed for a more precise comedic effect (such as stumbling over a simple word only to substitute a longer word without difficulty, or vice versa). This is parodied in A Connecticut Rabbit in King Arthur's Court, where Bugs Bunny struggles to pronounce the word "porcupine", which Porky pronounces with no trouble.

Porky's Duck Hunt was released in 1937, and Blanc officially became the permanent voice of Porky until his death in 1989. In later interviews, Blanc often said that he intended Porky's stutter to be suggestive of the grunting of actual pigs. Porky's Duck Hunt was also the first film of another Looney Tunes star, Daffy Duck.

== Clampett's Porky ==
Bob Clampett's Porky Pig intro in 1938–1939

Porky starred in dozens of films in the late 1930s. The directors still did not have a grasp on the character, however; his appearance, age, and personality all varied from picture to picture. Several such cartoons show Porky as a child with parents: father Phineas (Porky the Rain-Maker, Milk and Money, Porky's Poppa, and Porky and Teabiscuit) and an unnamed mother (Wholly Smoke and Porky's Hero Agency). Bob Clampett finally pinned Porky down in 1939, making him a permanent young adult: cuter, slimmer, smarter, and eventually less of a stutterer. Also, some cartoons show Porky as an antagonist (Porky's Duck Hunt, Porky's Hare Hunt, My Favorite Duck, A Corny Concerto, Duck Soup to Nuts, Daffy Doodles, Daffy Duck Hunt, Boobs in the Woods, Thumb Fun and Cracked Quack). Eventually, he settled into a kind persona. Clampett's Porky was an innocent traveler, taking in the world's wonders—and in Clampett's universe, the world is a very weird place. This principle is perhaps best demonstrated in Porky in Wackyland, a film that sends Porky on a quest to find the last of the surreal Dodos, Yoyo Dodo. Porky in Wackyland was selected for preservation by the National Film Registry in 2000.

In his commentary as part of the 1970s documentary film Bugs Bunny: Superstar, Clampett said that his early version of Tweety had to be redesigned after his first picture because the producers thought he "looked naked". Meanwhile, as Clampett noted, nothing was ever made of the fact that "all those years, Porky never wore any pants!" However, Porky was seen with pants in Porky's Badtime Story, Tick Tock Tuckered and Brother Brat.

== As a sidekick ==
Porky's post at the pinnacle of the Warners' pantheon was short-lived. In 1937, the studio tried pairing Porky with various sidekicks, such as love interest Petunia Pig, cantankerous foil Gabby Goat, a manic white hare that would eventually evolve into Bugs Bunny, and a screwy black duck, Daffy. Daffy Duck, the creation of Tex Avery, was by far the most popular in this role, eventually outshining even Porky. In fact, Friz Freleng satirized this phenomenon when he directed You Ought to Be in Pictures (1940), where Daffy convinces Porky to quit his job at Warner Bros. to find better-paying work elsewhere. Porky then convinces studio head Leon Schlesinger to release him from his contract. After a highly unsuccessful foray into the real world, Porky returns happily to the studio that created him. To this day, Porky remains as a loyal sidekick while Daffy refuses to be a second banana to Bugs, who eventually became Warners' signature character.

Porky always remained a sentimental favorite of the Warner directors. His mild-mannered nature and shy demeanor made him the perfect straight man for zanier characters such as Daffy. He still starred in a few solo cartoons as well, such as Frank Tashlin's Brother Brat. Other cartoons dumbed Porky down and cast him as a duck hunter after Daffy, largely paralleling the Elmer Fudd/Bugs Bunny pairings. Chuck Jones perfected the Porky-as-straight man scenarios, pairing the pig with Daffy Duck in a series of film and television parodies such as Drip-Along Daffy, Duck Dodgers in the 24½th Century, Rocket Squad, Deduce, You Say!, The Scarlet Pumpernickel and Robin Hood Daffy. Jones also paired Porky with Sylvester in a series of cartoons in the late 1940s and early 1950s, in which Porky plays the curmudgeonly and naive owner of the cat and remains clueless that Sylvester is constantly saving him from homicidal mice, space aliens and other threats.

== Later years ==
Porky was used in regular rotation in television syndication beginning in the 1960s, as were the rest of his Looney Tunes co-stars. A Saturday morning cartoon, The Porky Pig Show, ran from 1964 to 1967. In 1971, he starred in another show, Porky Pig and Friends. Both of these programs were collections of old theatrical shorts. Porky also appeared in all the classic film-feature compilations in the 1970s and 1980s. Another such collection was the 1986 film, Porky Pig in Hollywood, which ran in art and college theaters.

Porky Pig appeared in a self-titled comic book series published by Dell Comics from 1942 to 1962. The character then appeared in a series published by Gold Key Comics which ran for 109 issues from January 1965 to June 1984.

Porky made an appearance in the Touchstone/Amblin film Who Framed Roger Rabbit (1988) at the end of the film where he, being paired with Disney's Tinkerbell, closes the movie with his famous line "Th-Th-Th-That's All Folks!". It was the last time that Mel Blanc voiced Porky before his death in 1989.

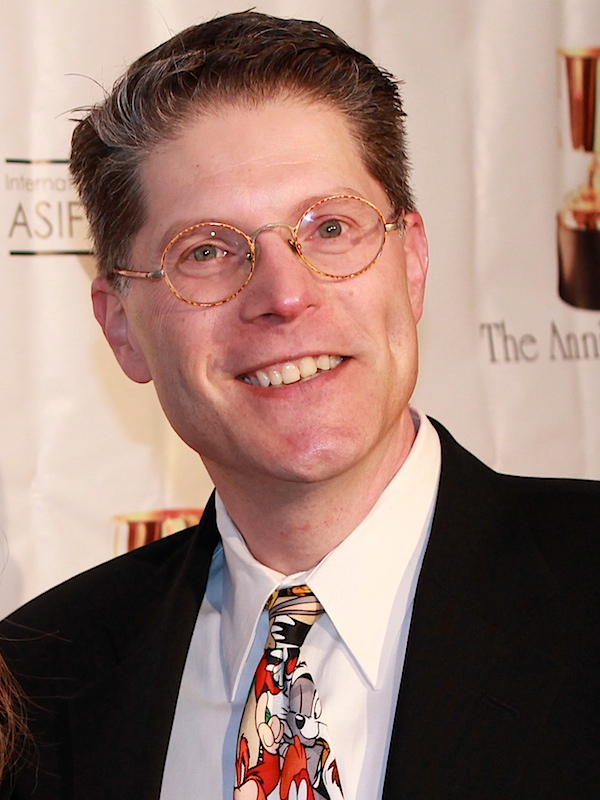
Bob Bergen has been the primary voice for Porky Pig since 1990.

In the 1990s animated series Tiny Toon Adventures, Porky appears as the mentor of Hamton J. Pig. He was voiced by Bob Bergen in "Animaniacs" and "Hero Hamton", Rob Paulsen in "The Wacko World of Sports", Noel Blanc in "Fields of Honey", "The Acme Bowl" and "Hero Hamton", Joe Alaskey in "Music Day", and Greg Burson in "It's a Wonderful Tiny Toons Christmas Special". Porky also made cameo appearances in Animaniacs (where he was voiced by Rob Paulsen in "De-Zanitized", Greg Burson in "The Warners' 65th Anniversary Special", and Bob Bergen in "Suffragette City") and Histeria! (where he was voiced by Billy West).

Porky appears in the movie Space Jam (1996) and collaborates with Bugs Bunny, Daffy Duck, Elmer Fudd, and Sylvester in challenging the Nerdlucks to a basketball game. He tries to get Michael Jordan's autograph when the basketball star is first recruited to join the team and later plays for the Tune Squad in the game itself, scoring one basket. Porky tries to end the movie with his famous line but is prevented by the combined efforts of Bugs, Daffy, and the Nerdlucks. He was voiced by Bob Bergen.

Porky is the star of the Super NES video game Porky Pig's Haunted Holiday (1995). He also made appearances in the games Looney Tunes: Acme Arsenal, Looney Tunes: Marvin Strikes Back!, Looney Tunes: Space Race, Sheep, Dog 'n' Wolf, Looney Tunes: Back in Action, Bugs Bunny Rabbit Rampage and The Bugs Bunny Birthday Blowout. Bob Bergen reprises his role in these games.

In the movie Looney Tunes: Back in Action (2003), Porky (Bob Bergen again) makes a cameo appearance alongside Speedy Gonzales, where they both lament their politically incorrect status. At the end of the movie, Porky tries to say his classic line, but stutters so much, the lights are turned off around him as the studio closes for the night; so an irritated Porky simply says, "G-g-go home, folks."

Porky appears as a toddler version of himself in Baby Looney Tunes (2002), albeit only in the show's musical numbers. Petunia functioned as the show's more major pig character.

Porky appears as the "Eager Young Space Cadet" in the animated series Duck Dodgers (2003–2005), again voiced by Bob Bergen.

Porky has a descendant in Loonatics Unleashed (2005–2007) named Pinkster Pig (who was also voiced by Bob Bergen). Pinkster had been an old friend of Danger Duck (Daffy Duck's descendant), but became a villain when he was adopted by Stoney and Bugsy (descendants of Rocky and Mugsy).

Porky also appears in most episodes of Cartoon Network's animated series The Looney Tunes Show (2011–2014), voiced again by Bob Bergen. He is still friends with Daffy Duck and often sucked into Daffy's schemes. Porky is also Daffy's nervous, fall guy buddy, similar to their relationship in classic comic books. It is also revealed in the show that in his high school years, he was a jock who bullied Daffy, while during their childhood years, it was Daffy who bullied Porky.

In the documentary I Know That Voice (2013), Bob Bergen explains how to recreate the pig's famous stutter, demonstrating how difficult it is to do it without practice. He finishes the segment by joking "Nobody [else] can do that, and that's why I have job security!"

Porky appears in the direct-to-video movie Looney Tunes: Rabbits Run (2015), reprised by Bob Bergen.

Porky Pig appears as a recurring character in New Looney Tunes (2015–2020), voiced again by Bob Bergen. Here, he is shown to be fatter, like some of his earlier appearances in the mid-1930s. Porky was first mentioned in "Dust Bugster", where he told Bugs about a television series whose name was not mentioned that led to Bugs binge-watching it.

A humanoid version of Porky also appeared in Tom King's Batman/Elmer Fudd Special, where he ran a bar called Porky's which often featured attendants that were humanoid versions of other Looney Tunes characters. The bar and Porky also made a cameo in Tom King's Batman series.

In the 2018 DC Comics and Looney Tunes comic crossovers, Porky appeared in a story that paired him with Lex Luthor. This version of Porky was the successful owner of a company named Porkybux before it was hacked and ran him out of business. He is later approached by Lex to be in charge of LexCorp's social media division and lets Lex get away with harassing his employees and stealing their sandwiches as repayment for the second chance. It is later revealed that Lex gave him the position to frame Porky when he used his social media website to steal important passwords from their users. Porky begins an autobiography in prison to expose Lex for his actions. In the backup story stylized more like Looney Tunes, Porky tries selling Acme office supplies to Lex but ends up stopping Lex from defeating Superman.

Porky appears in Looney Tunes Cartoons (2020–2024), where he is again voiced by Bob Bergen. His personality is based on the earlier shorts, however, his appearance is based on later shorts like The Looney Tunes Show for example. He is mostly paired with Daffy Duck who always drives him crazy.

Porky appears in the movie Space Jam: A New Legacy (2021), voiced by Eric Bauza. Here, he collaborates with other Looney Tunes and LeBron James in challenging the "Goon Squad" to a basketball game in the "Warner Bros. Serververse".

Porky appears in the preschool series Bugs Bunny Builders (2022–present) which aired on Cartoon Network's Cartoonito block and HBO Max, where he is voiced by Bob Bergen, reprising his role from Looney Tunes Cartoons.

Porky appears in the Teen Titans Go! episode, "Warner Bros. 100th Anniversary". He is among the Looney Tunes characters guests for the Warner Bros. centennial celebration, voiced once again by Bob Bergen.

Porky stars alongside Daffy Duck in the animated feature film The Day the Earth Blew Up (2024), voiced by Eric Bauza, reprising the role from Space Jam: A New Legacy. Here, he teams up with Daffy and Petunia against an alien mind-control plot the former uncovers.

Porky made a cameo appearance in the Stuart Fails to Save the Universe episode "Spoiler: Stuart Makes a Wallet", as one of the hallucinations that Stuart Bloom encounters while in the psychiatric facility. He appears in his original black-and-white design and is voiced by Mel Blanc via archive footage.

Porky Pig appears in the movie Coyote vs. Acme (2026), voiced once again by Eric Bauza. Here, he is one of Kevin Avery's routine clients, while also being Daffy Duck's pants-less model for his paintings at St. Looney's.

== "Blooper" ==
A short black-and-white cartoon was made in 1938 as part of a Warner Bros. blooper reel. It was shown on the Warner Bros. 50th Anniversary TV show. Porky is shown doing some carpentry work, pounding nails, when he smacks his thumb with the hammer. Grimacing in pain, he cries, "Oh, son of a bi-bi-, son of a bi-bi-, son of a bi-bi-bi-... gun!" He then turns to the viewers and says "Ha-ha-ha! You thought I was gonna say 's-s-son of a bitch', didn't ya?"

This short, so-called "blooper" can also be found on the Looney Tunes Golden Collection: Volume 4 of 2006, under the title Porky Pig Breakdowns of 1939 (with several versions of the clip, making it look like a true "blooper"), and on an Each Dawn I Die DVD box set, also released in 2006. Though the "blooper" was made a year before Gone with the Wind famously used the word in the line "Frankly, my dear, I don't give a damn", due to the Motion Picture Production Code the "blooper" was not shown publicly until the aforementioned special, which by that point FCC regulations softened enough for the word "bitch" to be used on television. The blooper was also shown as part of a package of other vintage bloopers on Warner Cable pay-per-view in the 80s. The blooper was animated by Rod Scribner.

== Filmography ==
=== Notable films ===
- I Haven't Got a Hat (1935) (debut)
- Plane Dippy (1936) (first cartoon in his series)
- Porky's Duck Hunt (1937) (first appearance with Daffy Duck)
- Porky in Wackyland (1938) (inducted in the National Film Registry for being culturally, historically and aesthetically significant)
- Porky's Hare Hunt (1938) (first appearance with Bugs Bunny)
- Porky Pig's Feat (1943) (one of the few short films in which Porky interacts with both Daffy Duck and Bugs Bunny)
- Kitty Kornered (1946) (first appearance with Sylvester)
- The Wearing of the Grin (1951) (final solo appearance)
- Corn on the Cop (1965) (final short theatrical appearance with original footage)
- Mucho Locos (1966) (with archive footage makes it his final short theatrical appearance)
- Who Framed Roger Rabbit (1988) (cameo)
- Space Jam (1996)
- Looney Tunes: Back in Action (2003) (cameo)
- Space Jam: A New Legacy (2021)
- The Day the Earth Blew Up (2024)
- Coyote vs. Acme (2026)

== Voice actors ==
- Joe Dougherty (1935–1937)
- Count Cutelli (1935–1937, additional lines)
- Mel Blanc (1937–1989)
- Gilbert Mack (Golden Records records, Bugs Bunny Songfest)
- Malcolm McNeill (Spin a Magic Tune)
- Unknown (Bugs Bunny Exercise and Adventure Album)
- Scott P. Allen (1984 "That's All Folks" cover)
- Gilbert Grilli (1984 "That's All Folks" cover)
- Noel Blanc (Looney Tunes: Love Songs for My Valentine, You Rang? answering machine messages, Happy Birthday, Bugs!: 50 Looney Years, Tiny Toon Adventures, Bugs Bunny on Broadway, Bugs Bunny and the Pink Flamingos read-along, Bugs Bunny at the Symphony)
- Jeff Bergman (The Earth Day Special, Gremlins 2: The New Batch, Bugs Bunny's 50th Birthday Spectacular, Bugs Bunny's Overtures to Disaster, Invasion of the Bunny Snatchers, Special Delivery Symphony, The 1st 13th Annual Fancy Anvil Award Show Program Special...Live!...in Stereo, Cartoon Network's Funniest Bloopers and Other Embarrassing Moments, Boomerang bumpers, Porky and Daffy in the William Tell Overture, Daffy Season)
- Rob Paulsen (Tiny Toon Adventures, Animaniacs)
- Bob Bergen (1990–present)
- Joe Alaskey (Tiny Toon Adventures, Crash! Bang! Boom! The Best of WB Sound FX)
- Keith Scott (The Christmas Looney Tunes Classic Collection, Tazos Looney Tunes commercial, Looney Tunes: What's Up Rock?!, Looney Tunes LIVE! Classroom Capers, The Looney Tunes Radio Show, Looney Rock, 2023 Australian Open)
- Greg Burson (Tiny Toon Adventures, McDonald's commercials, Animaniacs, Bugs Bunny: Rabbit Rampage, Acme Animation Factory, Porky Pig's Haunted Holiday, Quest for Camelot promotion)
- Eric Goldberg (Superior Duck)
- Billy West (Histeria!, Sprint commercial, My Generation G...G...Gap)
- Scott Innes (AT&T commercial)
- Gary Martin (Looney Tunes Take-Over Weekend promotions)
- Eric Bauza (Space Jam: A New Legacy, Bugs and Daffy's Thanksgiving Road Trip, Acme Fools, Looney Tunes pinball machine, The Day the Earth Blew Up, Looney Tunes: Wacky World of Sports, ACME Fools LIVE!, Coyote vs. Acme)

== Reception ==
Porky was ranked number 47 on TV Guide's list of top 50 cartoon characters. He was shown on one of that issue's two covers in a crossover scene with Duck Dodgers and The Powerpuff Girls.

== See also ==
- The Golden Age of American animation
- Piggy (Merrie Melodies)

== Bibliography ==
- Schneider, Steve (1990). That's All Folks!: The Art of Warner Bros. Animation. Henry Holt & Co.
- Solomon, Charles (1994). The History of Animation: Enchanted Drawings. Random House Value Publishing.
