= The Thrifty Pig =

1941 film by Ford Beebe

- Title frame
- Directed by: Ford Beebe
- Produced by: Walt Disney
- Starring: Pinto Colvig; Billy Bletcher; Mary Moder; Dorothy Compton
- Music by: Frank Churchill; Paul J. Smith (reused music from The Practical Pig)
- Animation by: Fred Moore; Art Babbitt; Norman King; Dick Lundy; Norm Ferguson
- Color process: Technicolor
- Production companies: Walt Disney Productions; The National Film Board of Canada
- Distributed by: The National Film Board of Canada; Government of Canada
- Release date: November 19, 1941
- Running time: 3:41
- Countries: Canada; United States
- Language: English

The Thrifty Pig (aka Thrifty Pig and Walt Disney's The Thrifty Pig) is a four-minute educational short animated film made by Walt Disney Studios for the National Film Board of Canada. Directed by Ford Beebe, the film is a condensed and modified version of Disney's 1933 short Three Little Pigs.

The Thrifty Pig is a World War II propaganda film. It was released theatrically on November 19, 1941, as part of a series of four films promoting Canadian war bonds.

== Plot ==
Practical Pig, Fiddler Pig, and Fifer Pig are three brothers who build their own houses with bricks, sticks, and straw respectively. Practical Pig warns his brothers to build their house with "War Savings Certificate" bricks so that the house will be a solid defence against the marauding Wolf. Fifer and Fiddler ignore him and continue to play, singing "Who's Afraid of the Big Bad Wolf?".

As they are singing, the Big Bad Wolf in Nazi swastika regalia attacks the two spendthrifts and blows Fifer's straw house down. Fifer manages to escape and hides at Fiddler's stick house, but the Wolf also blows it down, forcing the pair to hide at Practical's brick house. The Wolf tries to blow down the strong brick house (losing his clothing in the process) but is unable to make much progress, as the bricks have made a strong foundation.

Finally, Practical Pig chases the wolf away in a flurry of bricks that unerringly hit the Nazi marauder in his rear. The three pigs then sing "Who's Afraid of the Big Bad Wolf?" but with the caution that their house has to be in order to keep the wolf away.

A pastiche of war scenes follows, each of which ends with a message (such as an aircraft shooting out the message "Invest in Victory"). Other messages show the importance of spending less as well as lending savings to create the weapons of war. They recommend purchasing war savings certificates, which are sold in a "Five for Four" arrangement. (Note: The phrase "Five for Four" was coined to reflect a long-term return of five dollars for every four invested; it is also the name of another short educational film advocating the same cause in Canada during the war.)

== Characters ==
- Three Little Pigs (voiced by Pinto Colvig, Mary Moder and Dorothy Compton)
- Big Bad Wolf (as a Nazi German) (voiced by Billy Bletcher)

== Production ==
With the outbreak of a global war, Walt Disney Studios felt a great pinch in their finances due to the loss of much of their European markets. This was further limited with the invasion of France by Nazi forces in 1940, which meant that the next Disney release Pinocchio (1940) was only dubbed in Spanish and Portuguese, a great deal fewer languages than previous Disney works.

Due to this loss of profit, and losses on recent films, Disney studios faced a bleak outlook of a deficit of over half a million dollars, layoffs and pay cuts for the first time in the studio, and a $2.23 million ceiling on their credit allowance. With bleak prospects, the studio was made into a corporation in April 1940, which raised $3.6 million to help pay off debts owed by the studio. To enable his studios to keep afloat and producing films, Walt Disney sought out external funding to cover production costs, which would allow him to keep employees on the payroll and keep the studio working.

On March 3, 1941, Disney invited over three dozen different representatives of various national defence industries to a lunch meeting, in an attempt to solicit work from them. He followed this luncheon with formal letters offering work "for national defence industries at cost, and without profit. In making this offer, I am motivated solely by a desire to help as best I can in the present emergency". Four Methods of Flush Riveting (1941) was first training film that was commissioned by Lockheed Aircraft. (Note: Disney Studios would eventually make 200 wartime training films, predominantly for the United States military.)

In response to Disney's efforts, John Grierson, the head of the National Film Board of Canada entered into a co-production agreement for four animated films to promote the Canadian War Savings Plan. In addition, a training film for the Canadian Army, that eventually became Stop That Tank! (1942) was commissioned.

== Reception ==
While intended for a theatrical audience, The Thrifty Pig, along with the other three films in the series, was effective in delivering its message to Canadians through their local War Savings Committee. When America entered the war, these shorts were later released as part of the eight bond drives in the United States.

== Home media ==
The short was released on May 18, 2004, on Walt Disney Treasures: Walt Disney on the Front Lines.

== See also ==
- Blitz Wolf
- List of World War II short films
- Walt Disney's World War II propaganda production
