= Disney Magic (album) =

Compilation album by Various Artists
- Released: September 20, 2004
- Genres: Pop, soundtrack
- Label: Walt Disney

Disney Magic was released by Walt Disney Records on September 20, 2004. The album includes various pop stars like Christina Aguilera, Sting, Phil Collins, Celine Dion and Robbie Williams performing popular Disney songs. These tracks also appeared in Disney movie soundtracks. It is a two-disc album with 22 songs on each CD.

== Reception ==
Faridul Anwar Farinordin wrote that the songs "continue to stand the test of time with ... beautiful melodies and insightful lyrics." Gerald Martinez, in a positive review, said, "This is a set of commercial hits for all ages."

== Track listing ==
=== Disc 1 ===
1. You'll Be in My Heart - Phil Collins - Tarzan
2. Beyond the Sea - Robbie Williams - Finding Nemo
3. No Way Out - Phil Collins - Brother Bear
4. Beauty and the Beast - Peabo Bryson, Celine Dion - Beauty and the Beast
5. Reflection - Christina Aguilera - Mulan
6. My Funny Friend and Me - Sting - The Emperor's New Groove
7. Colors of the Wind - Vanessa L. Williams - Pocahontas
8. A Whole New World - Regina Belle, Peabo Bryson - Aladdin
9. Strangers Like Me - Phil Collins - Tarzan
10. Can You Feel the Love Tonight - Sally Dworsky, Kristle M. Edwards, Nathan Lane, Ernie Sabella, Joseph Williams - The Lion King
11. Kiss the Girl - Peter Andre - The Little Mermaid
12. The Bare Necessities - Phil Harris, Bruce Reitherman - The Jungle Book
13. Everybody Wants to Be a Cat - Phil Harris - The Aristocats
14. Look Through My Eyes - Phil Collins - Brother Bear
15. Bibbidi-Bobbidi-Boo - Louis Armstrong - Cinderella
16. He's a Tramp - Peggy Lee - Lady and the Tramp
17. Little April Shower - Bambi
18. When I See an Elephant Fly - Jim Carmichael, The Hall Johnson Choir - Dumbo
19. The Time of Your Life - Randy Newman - A Bug's Life
20. Someday - Donna Summer - The Hunchback of Notre Dame
21. He Lives in You - Lebo M - The Lion King 2: Simba's Pride
22. Can't Help Falling in Love - F4 - Lilo & Stitch

=== Disc 2 ===
1. On My Way - Phil Collins - Brother Bear
2. Go the Distance - Michael Bolton - Hercules
3. I Wan'na Be Like You (The Monkey Song) - Phil Harris, Louis Prima, Bruce Reitherman - The Jungle Book
4. Circle of Life - Lebo M, Carmen Twillie - The Lion King
5. True to Your Heart - 98°, Stevie Wonder - Mulan
6. Under the Sea - Samuel E. Wright - The Little Mermaid
7. Hakuna Matata - Nathan Lane, Ernie Sabella, Jason Weaver, Joseph Williams - The Lion King
8. When You Wish Upon a Star - Louis Armstrong - Pinocchio
9. You've Got a Friend in Me - Lyle Lovett, Randy Newman - Toy Story
10. Your Heart Will Lead You Home - Kenny Loggins - The Tigger Movie
11. The Ballad of Davy Crockett - Fess Parker - Davy Crockett: King of the Wild Frontier
12. Heigh-Ho - Snow White and the Seven Dwarfs
13. I'll Try - Jonatha Brooke - Return to Never Land
14. Shooting Star - Boyzone - Hercules
15. Zip-a-Dee-Doo-Dah - James Baskett - Song of the South
16. Who's Afraid of the Big Bad Wolf? - Billy Bletcher, Pinto Colvig, Dorothy Compton, Mary Moder - The Three Little Pigs
17. Mickey Mouse March - Mickey Mouse Club
18. The Siamese Cat Song - Peggy Lee - Lady and the Tramp
19. A Spoonful of Sugar - Julie Andrews - Mary Poppins
20. The Wonderful Thing About Tiggers - Jim Cummings - The Tigger Movie
21. Love Will Find a Way - Heather Headley, Kenny Lattimore - The Lion King 2: Simba's Pride
22. When She Loved Me - Sarah McLachlan - Toy Story 2

== Charts ==
Chart (2004)	Peak position
Singaporean Albums (RIAS)	1
