= All Together (1942 film) =

1942 Donald Duck cartoon

- Title frame
- Directed by: Jack King
- Produced by: Walt Disney
- Starring: Clarence "Ducky" Nash as "Donald Duck"; Pinto Colvig as "Doc" (other characters); Walt Disney as "Mickey Mouse"
- Music by: Frank Churchill; Paul J. Smith (reused music from The Practical Pig)
- Animation by: Ed Love; Art Babbitt; Marwin Woodward
- Color process: Technicolor
- Production companies: Walt Disney Studios; RKO Radio Pictures
- Distributed by: The National Film Board of Canada; Government of Canada
- Release date: January 13, 1942
- Running time: 3 minutes
- Countries: Canada; United States
- Language: English

All Together (also known as Walt Disney's All Together) is a three-minute educational short animated film made by the Walt Disney Studios, for the National Film Board of Canada. The film was released theatrically on January 13, 1942 as part of a series of four films directed at the Canadian public to buy war bonds during the Second World War.

All Together was directed by Jack King, and among other voice artists, featured the voice talent of Pinto Colvig as "Doc", Clarence "Ducky" Nash as "Donald Duck", and Walt Disney as "Mickey Mouse". This film marks the only appearance of Mickey Mouse in a World War II propaganda film. Additionally, Mickey appears in his older "oval eyes" design in this short due to animation being reused from older shorts. (Note: Among his many characters he voiced, Pinto Colvig had been cast as "Sleepy" and "Grumpy" in the original Snow White film.)

All Together features the characters from many of Disney's landmark animated features, including Mickey Mouse short films, Snow White and the Seven Dwarfs (1937), and Pinocchio. Much of the short consists of reused work from The Band Concert (1935) and Mickey's Amateurs (1937).

== Plot ==
In 1942, Mickey Mouse, conducting his band on a moving bandwagon, leads a parade marching through the streets of Ottawa, past the Canadian Parliament Buildings. In order, Pinocchio, Geppetto, Figaro, Donald Duck, Huey, Dewey, and Louie Duck, and Pluto carry banners with messages such as "All together for war savings" and "5 for 4".

Mickey Mouse motors by in a motorized float, conducting a band which includes Horace Horsecollar, Clarabelle Cow and Goofy, who plays the tuba and clarinet and a concertina, between his knees. The Seven Dwarfs follow with signs indicating, "All-Together-For-War-Savings" but with Dopey typically doing things in a clumsy, confused way, for slapstick effect. Overhead and in other scenes, war machines punctuate the message to "Keep your money fighting till victory is won."

== Cast ==
Disney characters:

- Mickey Mouse
- Donald Duck
- Goofy
- Pluto
- Huey, Dewey and Louie
- Horace Horsecollar
- Clarabelle Cow
- Pinocchio
- Geppetto
- Figaro
- Doc
- Grumpy
- Happy
- Bashful
- Sleepy
- Sneezy
- Dopey

== Production ==
In 1939, with the outbreak of a global war, Walt Disney Studios felt a great pinch in their finances due to the loss of much of their European markets. This was further limited with the invasion of France by Nazi forces in 1940, which meant that the next Disney release Pinocchio (1940) was only dubbed in Spanish and Portuguese, a great deal less languages than previous Disney works.

Due to this loss of profit, and losses on recent films, Disney studios faced a bleak outlook of a deficit of over half a million dollars, layoffs and pay cuts for the first time in the studio, and a $2.23 million ceiling on their credit allowance. With bleak prospects, the studio was made into a corporation in April 1940, which raised $3.6 million to help pay off debts owed by the studio. To enable his studios to keep afloat and producing films, Walt Disney sought out external funding to cover production costs, which would allow him to keep employees on the payroll and keep the studio working.

On March 3, 1941, Disney invited over three dozen different representatives of various national defence industries to a lunch meeting, in an attempt to solicit work from them. He followed this luncheon with formal letters offering work "for national defence industries at cost, and without profit. In making this offer, I am motivated solely by a desire to help as best I can in the present emergency." Four Methods of Flush Riveting (1941) was first training film that was commissioned by Lockheed Aircraft. (Note: Disney Studios would eventually make 200 wartime training films, predominantly for the United States military.)

In response to Disney's efforts, John Grierson, the head of the National Film Board of Canada entered into a co-production agreement for four animated films to promote the Canadian War Savings Plan. The films, in order of production, were: The Thrifty Pig (1941), 7 Wise Dwarfs (1941), Donald's Decision (1942) and All Together (1942), In addition, a training film for the Canadian Army, that eventually became Stop That Tank! (1942) was commissioned.

== Reception ==
While intended for a theatrical audience, All Together along with the other three films in the series, was effective in delivering its message to Canadians through their local War Savings Committee. When the United States entered the war, these shorts were later released as part of the eight bond drives in the United States.

== Television ==
All Together was shown on "Episode 56: Wartime Disney", part of The Ink and Paint Club (1997).

== Home media ==
The short was released on May 18, 2004 on Walt Disney Treasures: Walt Disney on the Front Lines.

== See also ==
- List of World War II short films
- Walt Disney's World War II propaganda production
