= The Flying Mouse =

- Directed by: David Hand
- Produced by: Walt Disney
- Starring: Marcellite Garner; Marion Darlington; Billy Sheets; The Three Rhythm Kings
- Music by: Frank Churchill; Bert Lewis
- Animation by: Hamilton Luske; Bob Kuwahara; Harry Bailey; Bob Wickersham
- Backgrounds by: Carlos Manríquez
- Color process: Technicolor
- Production company: Walt Disney Productions
- Distributed by: United Artists Pictures
- Release date: July 14, 1934
- Running time: 9:16
- Country: United States
- Language: English
- Budget: $31,386.82

The Flying Mouse is a Silly Symphonies animated short film produced by Walt Disney, directed by David Hand, and released to theatres by United Artists on July 14, 1934. The use of color here was rather innovative as it is set during the course of a single day.

== Plot ==
To the song "I Would Like to Be a Bird", a young mouse fashions wings from a pair of leaves, to the great amusement of his brothers. When his attempts to use them fail, the mouse got blown backwards from the wind and his rear end crashes into a thorn on the tree. The boy mouse falls down into the tub just as his mother finishes putting on a dress for his sister and gets them both drenched. While feeling embarrassed, he shrinks his sister's dress and attempts to run away but gets spanked and angrily released by his mother. The boy mouse cries and walks away, but when a butterfly calls for help, he rescues it from a hungry spider. When the butterfly proves to be a beautiful blue fairy, the mouse wishes for wings and begins flying around. But his bat-like appearance doesn't fit in with either the birds or the other mice, and he finds himself friendless; even the bats make fun of him, making a point that "You're Nothing But a Nothing". Then the beautiful blue fairy reappears and removes the mouse's wings, telling him: "Be yourself and life will smile upon you". The boy mouse runs all the way home where he is happily reunited with his mother and three mouse brothers who dance around him.

== Production ==
=== Story Development ===
The Flying Mouse started production/story development around July 1933, with the production # of US19, later becoming 20 after switching it with “The Wise Little Hen” (which was Donald Duck's debut). Inspired by their past cartoons about fables, it is unknown if The Flying Mouse followed the Aesop Fable of "The Bat, The Bird, and the Beast", but it's most likely it wasn't, because both stories are different. But the studio did follow a fable from 1668 called “The Jay Dressed up in the Peacock’s Feather” as inspiration and story development help.

The Disney studio wanted to try something differently with this cartoon and tried to make their first short with feeling and emotion. During development, the song "Who's Afraid of the Big Bad Wolf?" from the Three Little Pigs became extremely popular and a hit in the 1930s. So to continue that success, Walt tried to make other songs that hopefully could be memorable like Who’s Afraid of the Big Bad Wolf. Frank Churchill made the score for the short, and most memorably, the song “You’re Nothing but a Nothing”, which became the short's musical staple.The song didn't become memorable with audiences. Walt wanted to get more personally involved with the film, and personally directed, something he hasn't done since 1929, a part where after the mouse got picked up by the wind, got his rear end struck by a spike vine. David Hand resonated with Walt to not do this but Walt insisted it would get laughs. It did not. Walt would later direct himself an entire cartoon, which became The Golden Touch, and according to him it was the worst cartoon he ever did in his career. Anyway, story development ended in March 1934.

=== Animation ===
The animators in this short experimented with adding feeling and emotion into the cartoon and the characters, so the top animators in the studio worked in this short, like Fred Moore and Ham Luske. Backgrounds were drawn by Carlos Manriquez.

This was the studio's third attempt at making personality animation, or in better words, make a character look like it is thinking. This was first tried with the Three Little Pigs, but instead of thinking, each pig moved differently according to its personality. The second try was the 1934 film Playful Pluto, where animator Norm Ferguson tried to animate Pluto like he's actually thinking, trying to get a piece of flypaper out of his body.

This time, the studio now tried again with The Flying Mouse combining personality and emotion, which was achieved well. So good in fact that when a young artist Frank Thomas saw this in theatres, he then decided to join the Disney studio because according to him, it was an entirely different type of picture, where a cartoon character did not just move but thought. Frank Thomas would later convince Ollie Johnston to join the studio too, which both ended up decided to do because it was either working at Disney, or the WPA (which was a government created job during the Great Depression). The two later became one of the most legendary Disney animators.

The cartoon was finished around June 1934 and was shipped to Technicolor for developing, the film used 3-strip Technicolor, and had a negative cost/budget of US$31,386.82 (or 736,000 dollars as of March 2026).

== Voice cast ==
- Bat: Billy Sheets
- Male voices: The Three Rhythm Kings
- Bird whistles: Marion Darlington
- Laughing mice: Marcellite Garner

== Releases ==
Before its announced release, it had a premiere 2 days before at Radio City Music Hall accompanied with Walter Lang's “Whom the Gods Destroy”. And a week before that, the short's music was put on radio on KHJ. The Flying Mouse was released on July 14, of 1934, and became an extreme success, finally financing Disney for other big productions which later down the line helped with the making of Snow White and the Seven Dwarfs. The mouse and the mother even appeared in Mickey's Polo Team as a cameo.The film's songs didn't become a hit like Who's Afraid of the Big Bad Wolf as expected, but it became a major milestone in personality animation, which also led to other personality cartoons.

== Home media ==
The short was released on December 4, 2001, on Walt Disney Treasures: Silly Symphonies - The Historic Musical Animated Classics. Prior to that, the featurette also appeared on the Walt Disney Cartoon Classics Limited Gold Edition: Silly Symphonies VHS in the 1980s.

It was also released as a bonus feature, alongside fellow Silly Symphony short Elmer Elephant, on DVD and Blu-ray releases of Dumbo.
