= Funny Little Bunnies =

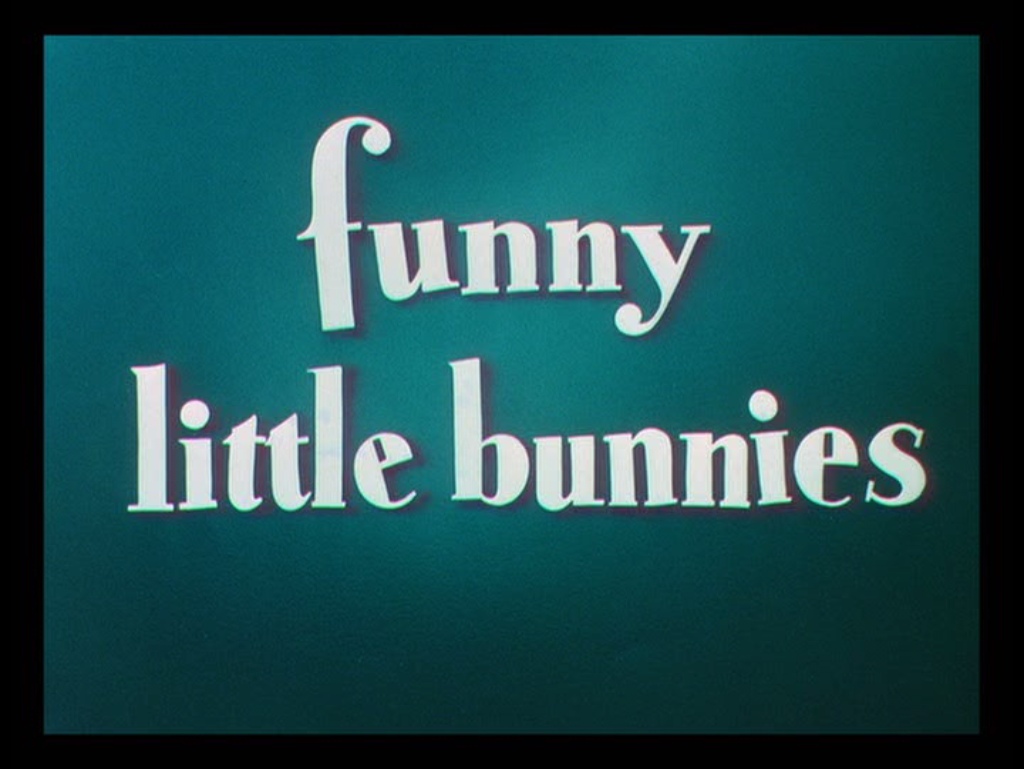
- Title card from Disney short Funny Little Bunnies (1934).
- Directed by: Wilfred Jackson
- Produced by: Walt Disney
- Starring: Florence Gill
- Music by: Frank Churchill; Leigh Harline
- Animation by: Art Babbitt; Joe D'Igalo; Dick Huemer; Dick Lundy; Hamilton Luske; Wolfgang Reitherman; Archie Robin; Leonard Sebring; Ben Sharpsteen; Cy Young
- Layouts by: Hugh Hennesy
- Color process: Technicolor
- Production company: Walt Disney Productions
- Distributed by: United Artists
- Release date: March 24, 1934
- Running time: 7:09
- Country: United States
- Language: English

Funny Little Bunnies is a Silly Symphonies animated Disney short film. It was released in 1934.

== Plot ==
The short is set in the enchanted dell of the titular Easter bunnies, which according to the storybooks, can be visited by those who believe the stories of the Easter bunnies are true. They show how they make the various treats associated with them in preparation for Easter.

== Production ==
The story outline on the short started in October of 1933 and has a temporarily working title of "The Funny Bunnies". During this era of Disney animation, the studio still hadn't figured out how to take control and correctly use the entire spectrum of color in Technicolor's 3-strip film system. As such, this short was used for experimentation to finally embrace a full, well colored picture, most notably the rainbow sequence in this short. The finished and exposed reel was delivered and finished on January 12 of 1934.

== Voice cast ==
- Main bunnies: The Rhythmettes (including Mary Moder, Beatrice Hagen, and Dorothy Compton)
- Singing chickens: Dot Farley, Louise Myers, and Florence Gill

== Home media ==
The short was released on December 4, 2001, on Walt Disney Treasures: Silly Symphonies - The Historic Musical Animated Classics.

== Book adaptation ==
The 1951 Little Golden Book Grandpa Bunny was loosely based on Funny Little Bunnies. It was written by Jane Werner, based on an adaptation by Dick Kelsey and Bill Justice.

== See also ==
- List of Easter films
