= Stop That Tank! =

- Title frame
- Directed by: Ub Iwerks (uncredited)
- Produced by: Walt Disney
- Starring: Billy Bletcher as The Devil (voice) (uncredited); Walt Disney as The Cow (voice) (uncredited); Pinto Colvig as Vocal Effects (voice) (uncredited)
- Narrated by: Peter Carter Page (uncredited)
- Music by: Frank Churchill (reused music from Three Little Wolves and The Practical Pig); Paul J. Smith (reused music from The Practical Pig)
- Animation by: Peter Carter Page; Ward Kimball; Fred Moore
- Color process: Technicolor
- Production company: Walt Disney Studios
- Distributed by: Department of National Defence (Canada); National Film Board of Canada
- Release date: March 1942
- Running time: 22 minutes
- Countries: Canada; United States
- Language: English

Stop That Tank! (aka Boys Anti-Tank Rifle) is a 22-minute 1942 instructional film created during World War II by Walt Disney Productions for the Directorate of Military Training, The Department of National Defence and the National Film Board of Canada (NFB). Its purpose, akin to "edutainment", was to instruct Canadian soldiers in the handling and care of the Boys Mk.1 Anti-tank rifle for use in combat against Nazi tanks. The film presented information in an entertaining manner as well as providing an anti-Nazi propaganda message.

Stop That Tank! is organized into two separate sections: the first animated section lasting three minutes, 15 seconds is a comedic demonstration of the anti-tank gun in an anti-Nazi propaganda "sketch", while the second longer section uses both cartoon animation and live action sequences to demonstrate proper use and handling of the Mk.1 Boys Anti-Tank Rifle.

== Plot ==
An armada of Nazi German tanks, led by Adolf Hitler der Fuehrer, approaches a town, with Hitler announcing, "the enemy is asleep" and ordering his troops to "give 'em the works". The tanks rush forward, firing into the sleepy town.

Camouflaged Canadian soldiers, equipped with the Boys Mk.1 rifle, start to emerge from various secret positions to stop the advancing tanks, hitting them repeatedly with accurate rounds. Hitler's tank receives a direct hit from the Canadian troops' fire and tumbles straight down into hell. In front of a huge, red, round-faced Devil, Hitler begins throwing an hysterical tantrum on the floor over his defeat. The Devil, shouting over the increasingly loud and irrational tantrum, indicates Hitler believes that against the anti-tank rifle, he cannot win.

The Boys anti-tank rifle is then described in detail through both animated and live action sequences. Using highly detailed schematic views, the design of the .55 calibre anti-tank rifle is analyzed. A demonstration of how to use the weapon stresses the need to accurately aim and "lead" a moving target, locate weak areas on armoured vehicles, and fire effectively at close range. Live action sequences demonstrate loading, firing, reloading, taking the weapon apart, cleaning and maintenance. This footage adds an air of authenticity "by virtues of its photographic realism".

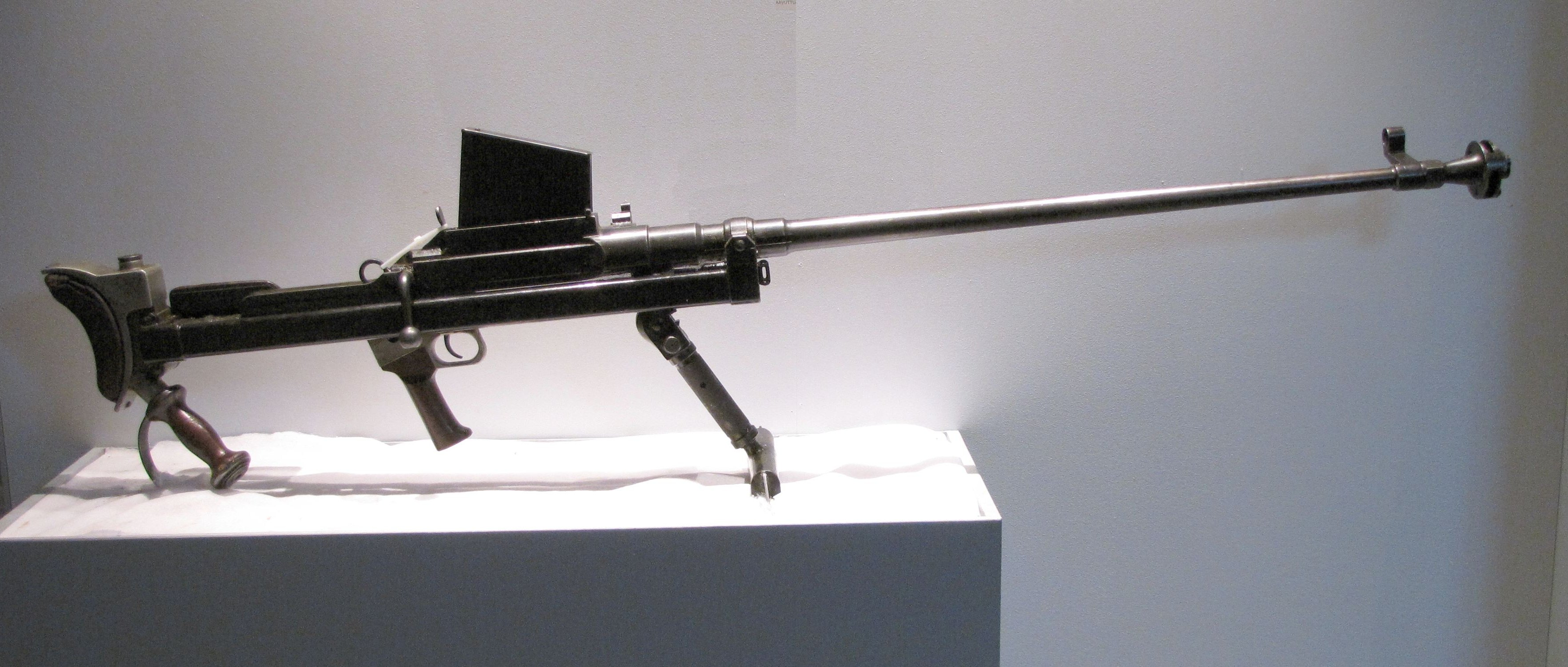
Boys Anti-Tank Rifle

The methodical and precise training section is intersected with moments of comic relief, although these are sparse and further display the educational nature of the film. First, a short, stout soldier attempts to lift the Mk.1 rifle but is not strong enough, and the rifle falls on top of his head and pins him down from the back of his neck. Next, a misjudged shot from the MK.1 Mk.1 rifle hits the backside of a bull in a nearby field, the bull angrily jumps rear end first into a pond and screeching "why don't you shoot where you're looking?" A soldier who underestimates the strength of the internal spring when taking apart his weapon, has the spring comically bouncing out of the magazine into the face of the short soldier from earlier in the film.

Finally, in invoking the old saw, "a rifle is like a woman, treat her right and she will never let you down"; the short soldier cuddles in bed with his Mk.1 rifle, giving it a kiss.

== Treatment ==
Although mainly focused on the educational and training side of the film, Stop That Tank! contains strong anti-Nazi and anti-Hitler propaganda. Disney cartoonists reduce Hitler to a ridiculous and non-threatening laughing stock drawn as a bulbous, red nosed buffoon, whose tongue flaps and waves from his mouth with flushes of hot breath and saliva. He delivers a Nazi salute and cries "Heil!" to which five faceless and identical soldiers respond with a unanimous "Heil Hitler!" Hitler then begins a speech made up of a string of gibberish and nonsensical noises, punctuated by stereotypical German words such as "sauerkraut" and "schnitzel" which has to be subtitled for the audience to understand.

In Hell, the Devil becomes the audience's translator for Hitler's screamed gibberish and tells the audience that Hitler is screaming, "It isn't fair, I'm being oppressed, and it's an outrage!" This representation of Hitler in hell takes a different approach than other cartoon shorts of the same nature from the war period. For example, in Frank Capra's Private Snafu's "Spies", Hitler is presented as the Devil himself, a looming, evil figure leering over Private Snafu. In Disney's portrayal, the Devil is seen as not as a purely evil entity, but rather the calmer, sensible counterpart to Hitler's hysterical and nonsensical behaviour. From this, Disney has created a version of Hitler who is laughable and is perceived to be easily defeated in order to reassure and boost the confidence of the Canadian soldiers for whom the film is intended.

The style and techniques of creating this tantrum-throwing, childish and incompetent Hitler character were being tested and experimented in early films such as Stop That Tank! and would be later developed in more prominent works such as Der Fuehrer’s Face (1943) and Education for Death (1943). Hitler's ridiculous nature is highlighted in his outlandish and exaggerated movement, which sees him bulging and sweeping across the top of his tank, and later writhing on the ground in Hell, unlike the later Disney anti-Nazi film, Der Fuhrer's Face.

The vaunted Nazi weaponry are also ridiculed, with Nazi tanks depicted as rickety, with their different parts bouncing up and down and coming apart from one another. The tanks develop their own faces to enable them to show their personified terror at the great damage being inflicted on their armoured bodies when, in a frenzied, cowardly retreat, the tanks are almost falling apart in their efforts to run from the bullets of the Canadian Mk.1 rifles.

== Boys Anti-Tank Rifle ==
Stop That Tank! is basically a training film intended to be used in the Canadian Army. The Boys Mk.1 rifles were produced in Canada by John Inglis and Company, and were distinguished primarily from other variants by the flat muzzle brake and V-shaped bipod.

After the Dunkirk evacuation in 1940, the Boys anti-tank rifle had gained the reputation from British and Canadian soldiers as a "jinx" gun, due to its ineffectiveness on German tanks. With the introduction of more heavily armoured German vehicles, the Boys Mk.1 quickly lost its effectiveness as an anti-tank weapon. The recommended firing range was subsequently reduced from 500 yards to 300 yards with its true effectiveness limited to within 100 yards of the target.

Stop That Tank! was not only intended to educate Canadian troops on the operation of the Mk.1 rifle but also put new recruits and existing soldiers at ease regarding doubts about their weaponry. The extended "textbook" style treatment, interspersed with humour as well as a propaganda message, was considered a very effective instructional tool. In a screening for members of the public, civilians felt that they had gained enough information "... to pick up a Mk.1 and blast a German tank out of existence".

== Production ==
With the outbreak of a global war, Walt Disney Studios felt a great pinch in their finances due to the loss of much of their European market - further limited by the Nazi invasion of France in 1940. This meant that the next Disney release Pinocchio (1940) was only dubbed in Spanish and Portuguese, many fewer languages than previous Disney works.

This loss of profit, combined with losses on recent films, meant that Disney studios faced a bleak outlook, with a deficit of over half a million dollars, layoffs and pay cuts for the first time in the studio's history, and a $2.23 million ceiling on their credit allowance. With bleak prospects, the studio was made into a corporation in April 1940, which raised $3.6 million to help pay off debts owed by the studio. To enable his studios to keep afloat and producing films, Walt Disney sought out external funding to cover production costs, which would allow him to keep employees on the payroll and keep the studio working.

In March 1941, Disney invited over three dozen representatives of various national defence industries to a lunch meeting, in an attempt to solicit work from them. He followed this luncheon with formal letters offering work "for national defence industries at cost, and without profit. In making this offer, I am motivated solely by a desire to help as best I can in the present emergency." Four Methods of Flush Riveting (1941) was the first training film made by the studio, commissioned by Lockheed Aircraft.

In response to Disney's efforts, John Grierson, the head of the National Film Board of Canada, entered into a co-production agreement for four animated films to promote the Canadian War Savings Plan. In addition, a training film for the Canadian Army was commissioned, eventually becoming Stop That Tank!.

The day after the attack on Pearl Harbor, the United States Navy issued Disney a contract for 20 training films. Later, Disney had contracts totalling 50 training films for the navy, and went on to become the most important producer of training films for the United States military. (Note: Disney Studios would eventually make 200 wartime training films.)

The style of realistic animation in Stop That Tank! was similar to that of the earlier Disney instructional film, Four Methods of Flush Riveting. The need for accuracy in depicting the Boys Mk.1 and its inner workings necessitated a Mk.1 rifle being shipped from Canada to California for Disney animators to study. After the release of four animated short films that were screened in Canada from November 1941 until early 1942, Stop That Tank! was the first internationally commissioned "technical" film by the Disney Studios and represented a "milestone" in the studio's history.

== Reception ==
Although not intended for a theatrical audience, Stop That Tank! was effective in delivering its message to Canadian troops through the Directorate of Military Training, Department of National Defence (Canada).

In a modern assessment of the film, a reviewer noted: "... comic reliefs were very welcome during the otherwise extremely dry and boring instruction film. However, for contemporary audiences only the opening sequence remains of interest. Its strong and rather vicious propaganda was going to be echoed in a lot of cartoons during the war era."

In a 2015 Popular Mechanics review, Eric Limer described Stop That Tank! as "... an especially good illustration of Disney's instructional work, but Stop that Tank was far from the only example of Disney's more explanatory work during the war. Between 1942 and 1945, Disney contributed footage to dozens upon dozens of films, often in the form of animated maps or diagrams that were plugged in-between lengthier live-action footage. Everything from methods for riveting to a crash-course in meteorology for pilots. While revisiting the more pungent animated propaganda of the time can be a little cringe-inducing, these instructional videos still hold up pretty well. They're educational artifacts about the weapons of a bygone area, as well as remnants of a fascinating partnership."

== Home media ==
The short was released on May 18, 2004, on Walt Disney Treasures: Walt Disney on the Front Lines.

== See also ==
- List of World War II short films
- Walt Disney's World War II propaganda production
