= Lullaby Land (film) =

1933 film by Wilfred Jackson

- Title card
- Directed by: Wilfred Jackson
- Produced by: Walt Disney
- Music by: Frank Churchill; Leigh Harline
- Color process: Technicolor
- Production company: Walt Disney Productions
- Distributed by: United Artists
- Release date: August 19, 1933
- Running time: 7 min
- Country: United States
- Language: English

Lullaby Land is a 1933 American animated short film directed by Wilfred Jackson. It is the 38th film of the Silly Symphonies series. The quilt from Lullaby Land inspired the garden section of the Storybook Land Canal Boats ride at Disneyland.

== Plot ==
A sleepy infant finds himself transported from his cradle to the "Lullaby Land of Nowhere", a dreamland where pacifiers grow on trees; diapers, bottles, and potty chairs march on parade; and the baby's stuffed gingham dog comes to life. He wanders into the "Forbidden Garden", which contains dangerous objects such as scissors, tacks, screws, nails, shears, connecting wires with alligator clips, carving forks, carving knives, jackknives, corkscrews, bottle openers, and fountain pens that the baby "mustn't touch". He callously smashes watches with hammers and plays with giant matches. The burning matches chase after him. The baby and his dog escape across a pond, using a huge bar of soap as a raft, but the smoke from the matches turns into three boogeymen, who chase him before vanishing. The benevolent Sandman, dressed as a wizard, spots the baby hiding and works his magic, sending him to sleep in his own cradle at home.

== Voice cast ==
- Girl trio: The Rhythmettes (including Mary Moder, Beatrice Hagen and Dorothy Compton)
- Bogey Men: The Three Rhythm Kings
- Sandman: George Gramlich

== Home media ==
The short was released on December 4, 2001, on Walt Disney Treasures: Silly Symphonies - The Historic Musical Animated Classics.
