= Old King Cole (film) =

1933 film by David Hand

- Title card
- Directed by: David Hand
- Produced by: Walt Disney
- Color process: Technicolor
- Production company: Walt Disney Productions
- Distributed by: United Artists
- Release date: July 29, 1933
- Running time: 7 min
- Country: United States
- Language: English

Old King Cole is a 1933 American animated short film directed by David Hand. It is the 37th film of the Silly Symphonies series. The film is based on several nursery rhymes and fairy tales, including "Old King Cole".

== Plot ==
One evening in Storyland, the story book "Old King Cole" opens itself, and the king's castle folds open. Other nursery rhyme books do the same thing, and several famous characters leave their homes and go to Old King Cole's party. There, all the characters have a small sing-and-dance act. When the Ten Little Indians get on stage, their dance is so catchy that Old King Cole and all the other characters join in as well. After Old Mother Hubbard accidentally pushes Old King Cole into a fountain, the mice from "Hickory Dickory Dock" tell everybody that it is midnight and that everybody should go home. All the characters return to their books, and Old King Cole sings a farewell song to everybody. Then he puts out a bottle of milk for the milkman before he runs back inside, and the cartoon ends.

== Voice cast ==
- King Cole: Allan Watson
- Girl trio: The Rhythmettes (including Mary Moder, Beatrice Hagen, and Dorothy Compton)
- Additional voices: Marcellite Garner and Mildred Dixon

== Home media ==
The short was released on December 19, 2006, on Walt Disney Treasures: More Silly Symphonies, Volume Two.
