= The Three Little Pigs =

Fairy tale

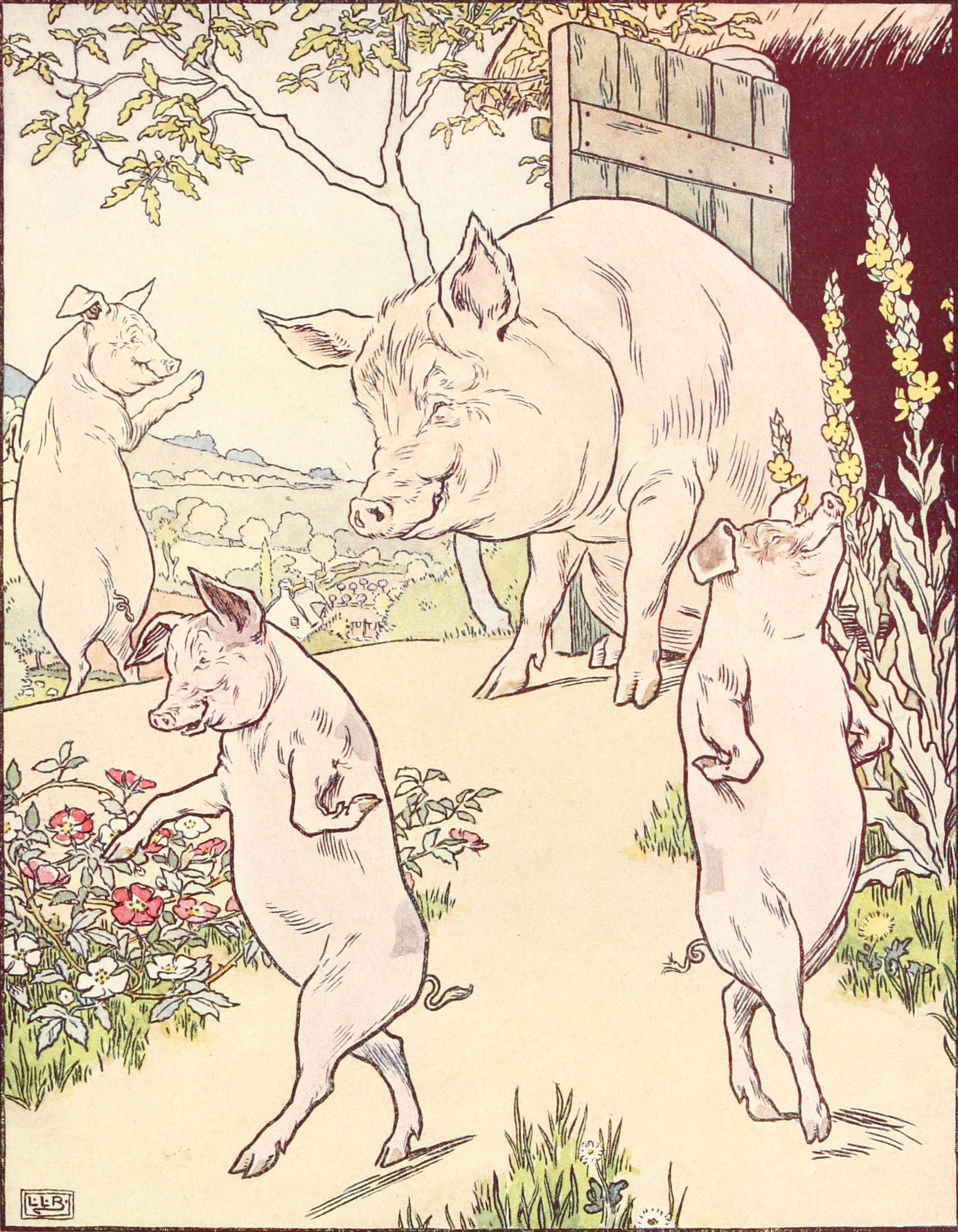
- The three little pigs leaving their mother in a 1904 adaptation of the story. Illustration by Leonard Leslie Brooke.

Folk tale
- Name: The Three Little Pigs
- Aarne–Thompson grouping: 124
- Country: England
- Published in: 1853

"The Three Little Pigs" is a fable about three pigs who build their houses of different materials. A Big Bad Wolf blows down the first two pigs' houses which are made of straw and sticks respectively, but is unable to destroy the third pig's house that is made of bricks. The printed versions of this fable date back to the 1840s, but the story is thought to be much older. The earliest version takes place in Dartmoor with three pixies and a fox before its best known version appears in English Fairy Tales by Joseph Jacobs in 1890, with Jacobs crediting James Halliwell-Phillipps as the source. In 1886, Halliwell-Phillipps had published his version of the story, in the fifth edition of his Nursery Rhymes of England, and it included, for the first time in print, the now-standard phrases "not by the hair of my chiny chin chin" and "I'll huff, and I'll puff, and I'll blow your house in".

The phrases used in the story, and the various morals drawn from it, have become embedded in Western culture. Many versions of The Three Little Pigs have been recreated and modified over the years, sometimes making the wolf a kind character. It is a type B124 folktale in the Thompson Motif Index.

== Traditional versions ==
"The Three Little Pigs" was included in The Nursery Rhymes of England (London and New York, c.1886), by James Halliwell-Phillipps. The story in its arguably best-known form appeared in English Fairy Tales by Joseph Jacobs, first published on June 19, 1890, and crediting Halliwell as his source. The earliest published version of the story is from Dartmoor, Devon, England in 1853, and has three little pixies and a fox in place of the three pigs and a wolf. The first pixy had a wooden house:

"Let me in, let me in", said the fox.
"I won't", was the pixy's answer; "and the door is fastened."

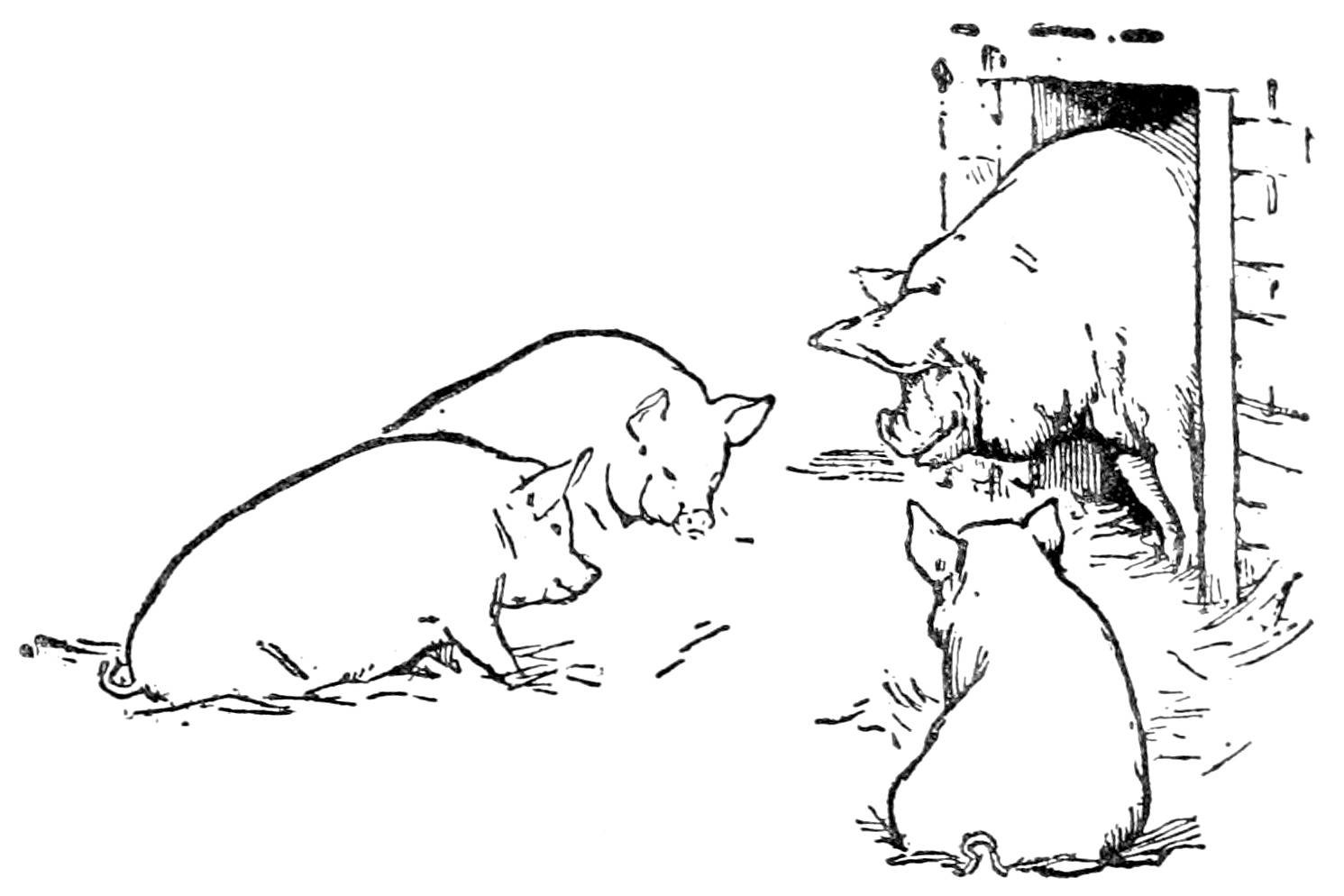
Illustration from J. Jacobs, English Fairy Tales (New York, 1895)

The story begins with the title characters being sent out into the world by their mother to "seek out their fortune". The first little pig builds a house out of straw, but the wolf blows it down and eats him. The second little pig builds a house out of sticks (furze in the original version), which too is blown down and the pig is also eaten. Each exchange between wolf and pig features ringing proverbial phrases, namely:

"Little pig, little pig, let me come in."
"No, not by the hair on my chinny chin chin."
"Then I'll huff, and I'll puff, and I'll blow your house in."

The third little pig builds a house out of bricks, which the wolf fails to blow down. The wolf then attempts to meet the pig at a turnip field, an apple orchard and a fair, but the pig always arrives early and avoids the wolf. Finally, the infuriated wolf resolves to come down the chimney, whereupon the pig lights a fire under a pot of water on the fireplace; the wolf falls in and is boiled to death. After cooking the wolf, the pig proceeds to eat him for dinner.

== Other versions ==
In many versions, the first two pigs escape to their brother's (or sister's in some versions) brick house. Most such versions omit any attempts by the wolf to meet the third pig after his failed attempt to blow the house in. Sometimes, the wolf simply burns his tail and runs away.

The story uses the literary rule of three, expressed in this case as a "contrasting three", as the third pig's brick house turns out to be the only one which is adequate to withstand the wolf. Variations of the tale appeared in Uncle Remus: His Songs and His Sayings in 1881, in which the pigs were replaced by Br'er Rabbit. The story also made an appearance in Nights with Uncle Remus in 1883, both by Joel Chandler Harris. Andrew Lang included it in The Green Fairy Book, published in 1892, but did not cite his source. In contrast to Jacobs's version, which left the pigs nameless, Lang's retelling cast the pigs as Browny, Whitey, and Blacky. It also set itself apart by exploring each pig's character and detailing the interaction between them. The antagonist of this version is a fox, not a wolf. The pigs' houses are made either of mud, cabbage, or brick. Blacky, the third pig, rescues his brother and sister from the fox's den after the fox has been defeated.

== Analysis ==
Writer Bruno Bettelheim, in his book The Uses of Enchantment, interprets the tale as a showcase of the capacity for anticipation and courage in the face of adversity, symbolized by the wolf. According to him, the individual who is content to prepare themself as the first two pigs will be destroyed by the vicissitudes of life, and only a person who builds a solid base can face such hazards. He viewed the tale as a means of telling children that one cannot always act according to the pleasure principle, and must submit to the reality principle when life demands it. He exemplified this point by observing that the first two pigs valued gratification rather than planning and foresight as the third pig had.

== Later adaptations ==
=== Animated shorts ===
- Three Little Pigs, a 1933 Silly Symphony cartoon, was produced by Walt Disney. The production cast the title characters as Fifer Pig, Fiddler Pig, and Practical Pig. The first two are depicted as both frivolous and arrogant. The story has been somewhat softened. The first two pigs still get their houses blown down, but escape from the wolf. Also, the wolf is not boiled to death but simply burns his own behind and runs away. Three sequels soon followed respectively as a result of the short film's popularity:
  - The first of them was The Big Bad Wolf, also directed by Burt Gillett and first released on April 14, 1934.
  - In 1936, a second cartoon starring the Three Little Pigs and the Big Bad Wolf followed, with a story based on The Boy Who Cried Wolf. This short was entitled Three Little Wolves and introduced the Big Bad Wolf's three pup sons, all of whom just as eager for a taste of the pigs as their father.
  - A third cartoon The Practical Pig, was released in 1939, right at the end of the Silly Symphonies' run. With its own series banner In this, Fifer and Piper, again despite Practical's warning, go swimming but are captured by the Wolf, who then goes after Practical only to be caught in Practical's newly built Lie Detector machine.
  - In 1941, a fourth cartoon much of the film was edited into The Thrifty Pig, which was distributed by the National Film Board of Canada. Here, Practical Pig builds his house out of Canadian war bonds, and the Big Bad Wolf representing Nazi Germany is unable to blow his house down.
  - Fiddler Pig, Fifer Pig, and Big Bad Wolf appeared in the film Who Framed Roger Rabbit.
- In 1942, there was a Walter Lantz musical version, The Hams That Couldn't Be Cured. The wolf (claiming he is a musical instructor) explains to the court how the three little pigs harassed him through their instrument playing which ends up destroying the wolf's house.
- In 1942, there was also a wartime version called Blitz Wolf with the Wolf as Adolf Hitler. It was produced by Metro-Goldwyn-Mayer cartoon studio and directed by Tex Avery.
- Four cartoons inspired by the Disney version were produced by Warner Bros.
  - The first was Pigs in a Polka (1943) which tells the story to the accompaniment of Johannes Brahms' Hungarian Dances, which was a serious musical treatment, directed by Friz Freleng.
  - The second was The Windblown Hare (1949), featuring Bugs Bunny, and directed by Robert McKimson. In Windblown, Bugs is conned into first buying the straw house, which the wolf blows down, and then the sticks house, which the wolf also blows down. After these incidents, Bugs decides to help the wolf and get revenge on all three pigs, who are now at the brick house.
  - The third was The Turn-Tale Wolf (1952), directed by Robert McKimson. This cartoon tells the story from the wolf's point of view and makes the pigs out to be the villains.
  - The fourth was The Three Little Bops (1957), featuring the pigs as a jazz band, who refused to let the inept trumpet-playing wolf join until after he died and went to Hell, whereupon his playing markedly improved, directed by Friz Freleng.
- In 1953, Tex Avery directed a Droopy cartoon, "The Three Little Pups". In it, the pigs are replaced with dogs and the wolf is a Southern-accented dog catcher trying to catch Droopy and his brothers, Snoopy and Loopy, to put in the dog pound. It was produced by Metro-Goldwyn-Mayer cartoon studio.
- In 1964 Walter Lantz reimagined the tale as the Three Little Woodpeckers with the Three Little Pigs having been replaced with Knothead (whose tree was made of straw), Splinter (whose tree was made of sticks) and Woody (whose tree was petrified), pursued by a somewhat dopey wolf who kept saying "That was a stupid thing to do."
- In 1980, the book with Erik Blegvad illustrations was made. In 1988, Weston Woods Studios created a short film based on the book.
- In 2023, the winner of the Doric Film Festival, Spirit of the Festival Award was Aaron Gayle (note: misspelled in citation) for his animated version of the Three Wee Grumphie (Doric for three little pigs) with all characters speaking the North-east Scotland dialect, and amusing twist in the tale, which features the wolf's mother.
- Home on the Range features a short called A Dairy Tale, where the character Mrs. Caloway tries to tell the story itself, but is constantly interrupted by other characters, who tell the story in their own ways.

=== Animated features ===
- 3 Pigs and a Baby is the first animated film in the Unstable Fables film series. The direct-to-DVD film was released on March 4, 2008, and stars Jon Cryer, Brad Garrett, Steve Zahn and Jesse McCartney.
- The three pigs and the wolf appear in the four Shrek films.

=== Television ===
- In 1985, the story was re-told as the first episode of Season Four of Shelley Duvall's Faerie Tale Theatre, with Billy Crystal as artistic "Larry Pig" (the smart third pig), Jeff Goldblum as henpecked "Buck Wolf", Stephen Furst as capitalistic "Peter Pig" (the first pig), Fred Willard as narcissistic "Paul Pig" (the second pig), Doris Roberts as "Mother Pig" and Valerie Perrine as love interest "Tina Pig". In this version, all three pigs buy their building materials from the same junk salesman (Larry Hankin).
- In Rabbit Ears Productions's Storybook Classics adaptation, the pigs appear to be female.
- The 1992 Green Jellö song, Three Little Pigs was adapted to a claymation music video.
- A few episodes of Barney and Friends feature a retelling where the Big Bad Wolf, instead of being boiled alive, is defeated when he faints from running out of breath trying to blow down the brick house.
- In the Shining Time Station episode, Schemer's Alone, Midge Smoot reads a version of this story to Schemer who paid her an IOU instead of real money, despite the fact that he's tricking his friends.
- The characters from the 1933 film adaptation of The Three Little Pigs appeared in the 2001 television series House of Mouse in many episodes, and again in the direct-to-video film Mickey's Magical Christmas: Snowed in at the House of Mouse.
- In 1996, from What a Cartoon! shorts program, in William Hanna's final cartoon short "Wind-Up Wolf", The Big Bad Wolf creates a robot minion wolf to attempt to finally get the Three Little Pigs.
- In 1996, the Tales from the Crypt season 7 episode "The Third Pig" presented an animated horror retelling of "The Three Little Pigs," in which the third pig is convicted of murdering his brothers and creates a zombie pig to take revenge on the actual murderer.
- The three pigs and the wolf from the Shrek films appear in the TV specials Shrek the Halls and Scared Shrekless.
- In the PBS Kids series Super Why!, Pig (Littlest Pig) is one of the main characters of the show. In the episode "The Three Little Pigs: Return of The Wolf," it is revealed that he is the youngest of the three little pigs. He transforms into Alpha Pig with Alphabet Power.
- In 2018, the story was told in the first season of Tell Me a Story, a serialized drama that interweaves The Three Little Pigs, Little Red Riding Hood and Hansel and Gretel "into an epic and subversive tale of love, loss, greed, revenge, and murder.
- Episode 1 of Dino Babies, "These Doors Are Made for Knocking", is based on this story.
- In the series Between the Lions, the story itself is featured in the episode "Huff and Puff"; however, two different sequels were written by two of the main characters: Leona's sequel shows the Big Bad Wolf becoming friends with the pigs after getting his tail burned while Lionel's depicts him being brought back to life by a mad scientist and renamed "the Wolf-inator", who is able to blow the brick house down, but gets chased away by the pigs as robots.
- In The New Adventures of Winnie the Pooh episode "Three Little Piglets", an alternate version of the story is told with the pigs replaced with three Piglets, the wolf replaced by a big bad bunny (played by Rabbit), the house of sticks replaced by Eeyore's house and then a house of playing cards, and the brick house replaced with Piglet's house.
- The Little Einsteins episode "Build It, Rocket!” is based on the story itself, but the plot also involves the main characters finding materials needed to build the brick house and the wolf being blown away by the pigs after failing to blow down the brick house.
- The Very Important People episode "Pig #2" features Ally Beardsley portraying one of the Three Little Pigs, who is coping with trauma caused by the death of their mother to the Big Bad Wolf, later revealed to actually be a miniature dachshund.

=== Literature ===
- One of Uncle Remus' stories, "The Story of the Pigs" (alt. title: "Brer Wolf and the Pigs"), found in Nights with Uncle Remus (1883), is a re-telling of the story, with the following differences:
  - There are five pigs in this version: Big Pig, Little Pig, Speckle Pig, Blunt and Runt.
  - Blunt is the only male; all the rest are females.
  - Big Pig builds a brush house, Little Pig builds a stick house, Speckle Pig builds a mud house, Blunt builds a plank house and Runt builds a stone house.
  - The Wolf's verse goes: "If you'll open the door and let me in, I'll warm my hands and go home again."
- The 1989 parody The True Story of the 3 Little Pigs! is presented as a first-person narrative by the wolf (here called Alexander T. Wolf), who portrays the entire incident as a misunderstanding; he had gone to the pigs to borrow some sugar to bake a cake, had destroyed their houses in a sneezing fit, ate the first two pigs not to waste food (since they had died in the house collapse anyway), and was caught attacking the third pig's house after the pig had continually insulted him.
- The 1993 children's book The Three Little Wolves and the Big Bad Pig inverts the cast and makes a few changes to the plot: the wolves build a brick house, then a concrete house, then a steel house, and finally a house of flowers. The pig is unable to blow the houses down, destroying them by other means, but eventually gives up his wicked ways when he smells the scent of the flower house, and becomes friends with the wolves.
- The 2008 children's book The Three Horrid Pigs and the Big Friendly Wolf changes the story: the pigs and the wolf are depicted as friends.
- The Three Little Pigs are often parodied or referenced in Monica and Friends comics, usually in Smudge-related stories due to his strong interest in pigs.

=== Music ===
- In 1953, Al "Jazzbo" Collins narrated a jazz version of The Three Little Pigs on a Brunswick Records 78 r.p.m. record album titled "steve allen's grimm fairy tales for hip kids" with piano blues accompaniment by Lou Stein.
- The 1976 Shu-Bi-Dua song "De tre små grise" on the album Shu-bi-dua 3 is about the three little pigs and their fight with big bad wolf.
- The 1989 Mucky Pup song "Little Pigs" from the album A Boy in a Man's World is a rap/metal version of the story featuring the dialogue between the wolf and pigs.
- The 1992 Green Jellö song, "Three Little Pigs" sets the story in Los Angeles. The wolf drives a Harley Davidson motorcycle, the first little pig is an aspiring guitarist, the second is a cannabis smoking, dumpster diving evangelist and the third holds a Master of Architecture degree from Harvard University. In the end, with all three pigs barricaded in the brick house, the third pig calls 9-1-1. John Rambo is dispatched to the scene, and kills the wolf with a machine gun.
- In 2003, the Flemish company Studio 100 created a musical called Three Little Pigs (Dutch: De 3 Biggetjes), which follows the three daughters of the pig with the house of stone with new original songs, introducing a completely new story loosely based on the original story. The musical was specially written for the band K3, who play the three little pigs, Pirky, Parky and Porky (Dutch: Knirri, Knarri and Knorri).
- Elton John's song "And the House Fell Down" (from The Captain & the Kid) is based (metaphorically) on the story.
- Barbadian singer Rihanna referenced a line from the story in her 2007 song "Breakin' Dishes" (from Good Girl Gone Bad).
- In 2014, Peter Lund let the three little pigs live together in a village in the musical Grimm with Little Red Riding Hood and other fairy tale characters.
- The second single from metal band In This Moment's 2014 album Black Widow, "Big Bad Wolf," references a little pig as well as the big bad wolf.

=== Other ===
- The Disney version of the three pigs can be seen in Walt Disney Parks and Resorts as meet-and-greet characters.
- The direct-to-video film Muppet Classic Theater includes The Three Little Pigs as one of the stories, featuring Miss Piggy, Andy and Randy Pig as the titular characters.
- In The Shining, Jack Nicholson's rampaging character, Jack Torrance, recites part of the tale ("Little pigs, little pigs let me come in...") before attempting to break-in to the bathroom in which his wife, Wendy (Shelley Duvall), is hiding.
- In the Japanese live action series, Kamen Rider Saber, this story is adapted into a "Wonder Ride Book", named "Kobuta 3Kyoudai (The 3 Little Sibling Pigs)", which was used by Kamen Rider Saber, the main character, for a while, but later becomes commonly used by Kamen Rider Kenzan.
