= Birds of a Feather (1931 film) =

1931 film by Burt Gillett

- Title card
- Directed by: Burt Gillett
- Produced by: Walt Disney
- Animation by: David Hand
- Color process: Black and white
- Production company: Walt Disney Productions
- Distributed by: Columbia Pictures
- Release date: February 10, 1931
- Running time: 8 minutes
- Country: United States
- Language: English

Birds of a Feather is a 1931 American animated short film directed by Burt Gillett. It is the sixteenth film in the Silly Symphonies series. It was released on February 10, 1931.

== Plot ==
As the film opens, 3 mute swans of various sizes swim across a lake, honking in tune. As they swim away, a black swan swims by, ripping out some of her tail feathers and throwing them aside, before letting her cygnets swim and play with the feathers while she forages for food, she then gets her head stuck in a shoe, honking wildly and swimming off, as her cygnets follow.

Meanwhile, on the shoreline, a peafowl struts across, before fanning his feathers in arrogance, but gets humbled by a mallard. In the trees, 2 lyrebirds play their tails like lyres, hence the name.

In the canopy, many songbirds twitter, as an odd looking bird's eggs hatch and beg, hummingbirds pollinate flowers higher up, as oropendolas are startled by cuckoos, and those same cuckoos scare some cardinals. A plump toucan mother tries to caw to her fledgling, but the fledgling makes a loud, erratic sound, scaring the mother. Above them, an aracari dances along a branch, using its tail as a pair of legs. A woodpecker hunts for prey, yet a caterpillar, annoyed, taps the woodpeckers head, causing the woodpecker to chase and consume the caterpillar.

Meanwhile, a trio of horned owls croon together, while a crow sneaks towards a blackbird nest, goes into the nest and steals a worm from the mother for its own chicks, but as the chicks scramble, the worm escapes, only to be chased by a hen and her chicks.

The chicken, as she chases the worm, throws a shoe, pipe, can, and another show onto some of her chicks, causing them to crash. The hen tries to get the worm, yet fails, and in a fit of rage, attempts to catch it again. A black chick ends up catching it, but ends up failing as well. As the hen forages, a hawk circles overhead, causing the hen to lead the chicks under her brood feathers and flee, the hawk almost catches a chick, but the chick is saved last second.

The black chick, who had run the other way, trips over a rock, and ends up being caught. A swallow hops behind, and using a funnel, calls to its flock. The whole swallow army chases the hawk, who is planning to kill and eat the chick, one of the swallows fail to catch up, yet uses its tail as a propeller. The hawk gets mobbed by the flock viciously, failing to retort. One of them flies up high, dives down and starts to distract the hawk long enough for the flock to go down and pluck all its feathers off, leading the hawk to fall to its death, ending the aerial dogfight.

The chick falls down too, yet the swallows save it in time, landing it safely, the chick watches the swallows fly off, but then sees the hen and the rest of the chicks crying and mourning over its supposed death, but the chick lets out an Al Jolson-esque "Mammy!", the hen realises the chick is in fact alive, and runs up to it, embracing the chick and clucking happily, as the other chicks jump for joy, ending the short.

== Voice cast ==
- Florence Gill: Hen, assorted squawks and bird whistles
- Purv Pullen and Marion Darlington: Bird Whistles
- Toby Wing: Baby chicks
- The Rhythmettes (including Dorothy Compton, Beatrice Hagen, and Mary Moder): Hummingbirds and Brox Sister owls

== Comic adaptation ==
The Silly Symphony Sunday comic strip ran a three-month-long adaptation of Birds of a Feather from March 11 to June 17, 1934.

== Reception ==
Variety (April 15, 1931): "This subject suffers from too much similarity with previous cartoons of this and other series... This weakness makes it filler stuff for the intermediate programs and lesser spots only. It's a concoction of rhythmic gyration by various fowl".

== Home media ==
The short was released on December 4, 2001, on Walt Disney Treasures: Silly Symphonies - The Historic Musical Animated Classics.
