= The Big Bad Wolf (1934 film) =

1934 animated short film

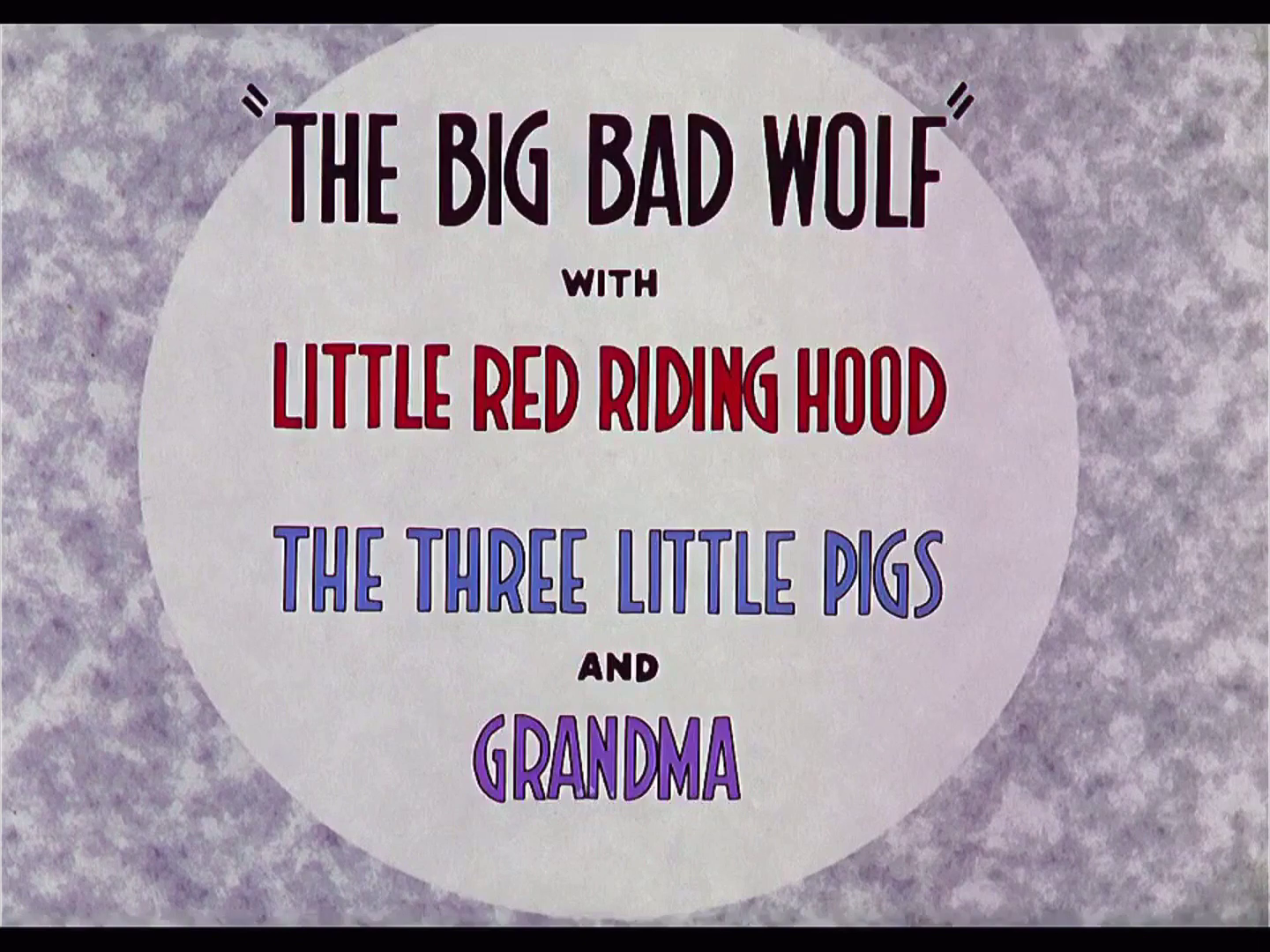
- Directed by: Burt Gillett
- Produced by: Walt Disney
- Starring: Shirley Reed; Pinto Colvig; Billy Bletcher; Mary Moder; Dorothy Compton
- Music by: Frank Churchill
- Animation by: Art Babbitt
- Color process: Technicolor
- Production company: Walt Disney Productions
- Distributed by: United Artists; RKO Radio Pictures (1948 Reissue)
- Release date: April 13, 1934
- Running time: 9:23
- Language: English

The Big Bad Wolf is an animated short film released on April 13, 1934, by United Artists & RKO Radio Pictures produced by Walt Disney and directed by Burt Gillett as part of the Silly Symphonies series. Acting partly as a sequel to the wildly successful adaptation of The Three Little Pigs of the previous year (maintaining the previous film's title characters as well as its villain), this film also acts as an adaptation of the fairy-tale Little Red Riding Hood, with the Big Bad Wolf from 1933's Three Little Pigs acting as the adversary to Little Red Riding Hood and her grandmother.

== Plot ==
Ignoring the advice of Practical Pig, Little Red Riding Hood, escorted by Fiddler and Fifer, takes a shortcut through the woods to Grandma's house. They end up encountering Goldilocks the Fairy Queen, who is soon revealed, thanks to a branch breaking, to be the Big Bad Wolf in disguise. Realizing they'd been tricked, Fiddler and Fifer run home, whilst Little Red Riding Hood escapes from the Wolf. The Big Bad Wolf, however, isn't giving up on getting dinner, and goes to Grandma's house, where he chases Grandma into the closet and gets in bed disguised as her. Little Red Riding Hood arrives and after the expected "what big eyes/nose/mouth you've got" spiel is terrified to see the Big Bad Wolf posing as her grandmother. Fiddler and Fifer alert Practical Pig, who manages to beat the Wolf by putting popcorn seeds and hot coals down his pants. With the wolf defeated once again, Little Red Riding Hood and the pigs sing and play "Who's Afraid of the Big Bad Wolf".

== Voice cast ==
- Shirley Reed as Little Red Riding Hood
- Pinto Colvig as Practical Pig
- Billy Bletcher as Big Bad Wolf
- Mary Moder as Fiddler Pig
- Dorothy Compton as Fifer Pig

== Reaction ==
Made as a somewhat reluctant response to the success of the earlier short, The Big Bad Wolf did not quite achieve the levels of popularity of Three Little Pigs (which was huge), though two more shorts predominantly featuring the Big Bad Wolf and the pigs came about (The Three Little Wolves and The Practical Pig), in addition to countless appearances in a variety of shorts, comic strips, war-time propaganda pieces and TV series.

== Home media ==
The short was released on December 4, 2001, on Walt Disney Treasures: Silly Symphonies - The Historic Musical Animated Classics.
