= Pluto's Judgement Day =

1935 Mickey Mouse cartoon

- Directed by: David Hand
- Produced by: Walt Disney
- Starring: Don Brodie; Pinto Colvig; Walt Disney; Lee Millar; Clarence Nash; Billy Bletcher; The Rhythmettes; Billy Sheets; Homer Hall male quartet
- Music by: Frank Churchill; Leigh Harline
- Animation by: Dick Lundy; Hamilton Luske; Fred Moore; Bill Roberts; Bob Wickersham; Clyde Geronimi; Ward Kimball; Hardie Gramatky
- Color process: Technicolor
- Production company: Walt Disney Productions
- Distributed by: United Artists
- Release date: August 31, 1935
- Running time: 8 minutes
- Country: United States
- Language: English

Pluto's Judgement Day is a Mickey Mouse dark comedy horror cartoon released theatrically in 1935. Although labeled a Mickey cartoon, the main star is Pluto. It was the 78th short film in the Mickey Mouse series to be released, the seventh of that year.

== Plot ==
Pluto chases a kitten through the forest, a mud puddle, and right into a window, causing a mess in Mickey's house. Mickey angrily scolds Pluto for his mean and nasty behavior towards cats, warning him that he will have "plenty to answer for on [his] judgement day" if he keeps this up. Mickey then goes off to wash the kitten while Pluto falls asleep in front of the fireplace.

While asleep, a phantom cat goads Pluto into chasing him, over a hallucinatory Mickey's objections, and Pluto is lured into a forest of evil cat-like trees, and a cat head-shaped mountain trap, where he slides down into a pit, where shackles magically chain him and he is put on trial as the cats declare him "Public Enemy No. 1" for all his crimes against cats. All the cats whom Pluto has ever tormented testify against him: a tubby cat speaks of being picked on and chased by Pluto because he (the cat) was fat and was flattened by a steamroller while running away from Pluto; a psychiatric patient is wheeled out to demonstrate the post-traumatic stress disorder which he developed from Pluto's barking; and three young kittens (resembling blackface) sing of how Pluto stole their meals and drowned their Uncle Tom (as Tom's nine ghosts briefly appear) in a river. Pluto is inevitably found guilty and is about to be burned alive by being tied in a seat and lowered into flames by the angry cats, when he wakes up after a hot cinder from the fireplace strikes his rear. Pluto rushes off into the tub to ease the burn, and Mickey, washing the kitten, urges the two to make up, which each one readily does much to Mickey's delight.

== Voice cast ==
- Walt Disney as Mickey Mouse
- Lee Millar as Pluto
- Pinto Colvig as Cat Doctor
- Billy Bletcher as Cat Prosecutor
- Clarence Nash as the kitten and Cat Victim #2 and Cat Judge and Cat Jury
- Billy Sheets as Cat Jury
- Don Brodie as Dream Cat and Cat Victim #1
- Homer Hall male quartet as Cat Jury and Uncle Tom's ghosts
- The Rhythmettes as singing kittens

== Television ==
- c. 1977 – The Wonderful World of Disney, episode #5: "Halloween Hall o' Fame" (TV)

== Home media ==
The short was released on December 4, 2001, on Walt Disney Treasures: Mickey Mouse in Living Color.

== See also ==
- Mickey Mouse (film series)
- Heavenly Puss
