= Walt Disney Treasures: Wave One =

Walt Disney DVD collection

The first wave of Walt Disney Treasures was released on December 4, 2001. It includes four different DVD sets. 150,000 sets were produced.

== Mickey Mouse in Living Color ==

This set covers the first leg of Mickey Mouse's color career, from 1935 to 1938.

=== Disc one ===
==== 1935 ====
- The Band Concert
- Mickey's Garden
- On Ice
- Pluto's Judgement Day
- Mickey's Fire Brigade

==== 1936 ====
- Thru the Mirror
- Mickey's Circus
- Mickey's Elephant
- Mickey's Grand Opera
- Mickey's Polo Team
- Alpine Climbers
- Moving Day
- Mickey's Rival
- Orphans' Picnic

==== Bonus features ====
- Parade of the Award Nominees (1932), a short made especially for the Academy Awards show
- Pencil-test versions of Mickey's Fire Brigade, Pluto's Judgment Day and On Ice
- Easter Egg: A clip from the Disneyland story appears as an Easter egg on this disc, it shows Disney talking about Mickey's creation and saying, "I only hope that we never lose sight of one thing, that it was all started by a mouse."

=== Disc two ===
==== 1937 ====
- Hawaiian Holiday
- Moose Hunters
- The Worm Turns
- Magician Mickey
- Mickey's Amateurs
- Clock Cleaners
- Lonesome Ghosts

==== 1938 ====
- Mickey's Parrot
- Boat Builders
- The Whalers
- Mickey's Trailer
- Brave Little Tailor

==== Bonus features ====
- Mickey in Living Color with Leonard Maltin, a short biography of sorts on the early portion of Mickey's cartoon career
- Mickey's Surprise Party (1939), Easter egg bonus, this cartoon was created for the 1939 New York World's Fair and was sponsored by Nabisco

==== Notes ====
The Clock Cleaners short on this release is the edited version. During the 1990s, Donald Wildmon and the American Family Association persuaded Wal-Mart to discontinue the sale of the VHS tape "Cartoon Classics: Fun on the Job!", which contained the film. The reason for this was that during his argument with the main spring in the adjacent image, Donald Duck allegedly shouts the F-word and "son of a bitch", yet in Clarence Nash's semi-intelligible voice, he actually says "Says who?" and "snake in the grass", the former of which is made clear by the spring's reply – "Says I!" Additionally, the Motion Picture Production Code, popularly known as the "Hays Code", adopted in 1934, would never have allowed the language in the first place.

Due to this controversy, when the cartoon was included on the Walt Disney Treasures DVD set "Mickey Mouse in Living Color", Donald's line "Says who?" was redubbed as "Awww, nuts!", which was originally said in On Ice (1935), and "snake in the grass" was replaced with angry gibberish. These edits were carried over to other DVD releases, including The Great Mouse Detective (2002), Funny Factory with Goofy (2006), and the bonus Epic Mickey DVD (2010).

However, other DVD releases have kept the cartoon's original line reinstated (as well as its original RKO titles and illustrated title card), such as Alice in Wonderland: Masterpiece Edition (2004) and Have a Laugh!: Volume 2 (2010). More recent broadcasts of the cartoon on Disney Channel have also included the original line. On Disney+, "Says who?" remains unchanged, while "snake in the grass" is still replaced with gibberish.

== Silly Symphonies ==

This set is more or less descriptive of "The Best of the Silly Symphonies", with the cartoons presented here in arranged by theme.

=== Disc one ===
==== Fables and Fairy Tales ====
- Mother Goose Melodies (1931)
- Babes in the Woods (1932)
- Lullaby Land (1933)
- The Flying Mouse (1934)
- The Golden Touch (1935)
- The Robber Kitten (1935)
- The Tortoise and the Hare (1935)
- The Country Cousin (1936)
- Elmer Elephant (1936)

==== Favorite Characters ====
- Three Little Pigs (1933)
- The Big Bad Wolf (1934)
- The Wise Little Hen (1934)
- Three Little Wolves (1936)
- Toby Tortoise Returns (1936)

==== Leonard's Picks ====
- Three Little Pigs (1933)
- The Flying Mouse (1934)
- The Grasshopper and the Ants (1934)
- The Tortoise and the Hare (1935)
- Wynken, Blynken and Nod (1938)

==== Additional cartoons (via Easter eggs) ====
- Water Babies (1935)
- Who Killed Cock Robin? (1935)
- The Practical Pig (1939)

=== Disc two ===
==== Nature on Screen ====
- The Ugly Duckling (1931)
- Birds of a Feather (1931)
- The Busy Beavers (1931)
- Just Dogs (1932)
- Father Noah's Ark (1933)
- Peculiar Penguins (1934)
- Funny Little Bunnies (1934)
- Mother Pluto (1936)
- The Old Mill (1937)
- The Ugly Duckling (1939)

==== Accent on Music ====
- The Skeleton Dance (1929)
- The China Plate (1931)
- Egyptian Melodies (1931)
- Flowers and Trees (1932)
- The Cookie Carnival (1935)
- Music Land (1935)
- Woodland Café (1937)

==== Leonard's Picks ====
- The Skeleton Dance (1929)
- The Ugly Duckling (1931)
- Flowers and Trees (1932)
- Music Land (1935)
- The Ugly Duckling (1939)

==== Additional cartoon (via Easter eggs) ====
- Farmyard Symphony (1938)

==== Bonus features ====
- Songs of the Silly Symphonies: Leonard Maltin meets with Richard M. Sherman to discuss songs that appear in the Silly Symphonies, including "The World Owes Me a Livin'" and "Who's Afraid of the Big Bad Wolf?"
- Silly Symphony Souvenirs: Leonard Maltin meets with Dave Smith at the Walt Disney Archives to discuss merchandise inspired by the series
- Still galleries: Behind-the-scenes and promotional pictures of the Silly Symphony series

==== Notes ====
One sequence in the Three Little Pigs showed the Big Bad Wolf dressed as a stereotypical Jewish peddler for Fuller brushes in an attempt to trick Practical Pig into allowing him to enter his brick house, complete with a hat, a coat, a fake Jewish nose, glasses, and a fake beard; also, Yiddish music plays as the wolf disguises his voice with a strong Yiddish accent while saying "I'm the Fuller Brush man. I'm giving a free sample."

Shortly after the film's release, Rabbi J.X. Cohen (the director of the American Jewish Congress) wrote angrily to Walt Disney, calling the scene "vile, revolting and unnecessary as to constitute as direct affront on Jews" and demanded the scene to be removed. Roy O. Disney, speaking on Walt's behalf, responded to Cohen by saying: "We have a great many Jewish business associates and friends, and certainly would avoid purposely demeaning the Jews or any other race or nationality. … It seems to us that this character is no more [offensive] than [how] many well-known Jewish comedians portray themselves in vaudeville, stage, and screen characterizations."

When the short was reissued in the 1940s, the scene was re-animated with the Wolf's disguise now only including a different pair of glasses, along with the same aforementioned hat and coat. His disguised voice no longer has a thick Yiddish accent and the line is changed to "I'm the Fuller Brush man. I'm working my way through college." Jack Hannah and his unit handled these changes; he told historian Jim Korkis that Walt Disney requested him to make these changes (despite there being no outside pressure for him to do so) simply because he felt the scene was not funny anymore and potentially hurtful after World War II.

The US release of this set features the edited version, whereas the UK and Australian releases shows the original Jewish peddler. Both versions use the modified audio from the 1940s version. According to Leonard Maltin, it was his call to use the re-animated footage, a decision he later regretted: "I don't know that I would make the same decision I made then... I decided [since] this was our very first release – one of four DVD sets that kicked off the series – and I feared showing the Jewish peddler [scene]... would be a turn off and would upset enough people to push them away from watching these vintage cartoons. So I took what I will call ... the coward's way out at that time. I don't know [if] that was the right decision or not."

== Disneyland, USA ==

This set depicts various episodes of the Walt Disney anthology series that take place within and/or are about Disneyland. It includes also the very first episode from the series.

=== Disc one ===
- The Disneyland Story: First broadcast on October 27, 1954.
- Dateline Disneyland: First broadcast on July 17, 1955.

=== Disc two ===
- Disneyland After Dark: First broadcast on April 15, 1962.
- Disneyland 10th Anniversary: First broadcast on January 3, 1965.

==== Bonus features ====
- Still gallery: This gallery shows off images of various Disneyland attractions' posters, past and present.
- The Magic Kingdom and the Magic of Television: Although most of the content of this mini-history of Disneyland is repeated from other intros on these set with a montage of clips from all the episodes presented, it does feature some nuggets of information about Walt's view of the park as a tribute to Americana, his aspiration for the park to have the latest products technology and even a few world leaders that had visited the park.

== Davy Crockett ==

This set contains the original five episodes of Davy Crockett which were first shown on the Walt Disney anthology series from 1954-1955. This miniseries was re-released as a DVD Two-Movie Set on September 7, 2004.

=== Disc one ===
- Davy Crockett Indian Fighter: First broadcast on 15 December 1954.
- Davy Crockett Goes to Congress: First broadcast on 16 January 1955.
- Davy Crockett at the Alamo: First broadcast on 23 February 1955.

=== Disc two ===
- Davy Crockett's Keelboat Race: First broadcast on 16 November 1955.
- Davy Crockett and the River Pirates: First broadcast on 14 December 1955.

==== Bonus features ====
- "A Conversation with Fess Parker": Leonard Maltin interviews Fess Parker, who played Davy in the episodes.
- "The Davy Crockett Craze": Leonard Maltin interviews Paul F. Anderson, author of the book The Davy Crockett Craze.
- Easter egg: "The Ballad of Davy Crockett": The famous ballad, sung by Fess Parker.
- Still gallery: Stills from various aspects of the production.
