= Wynken, Blynken and Nod (film) =

Wynken, Blynken & Nod
- Directed by: Graham Heid
- Produced by: Walt Disney
- Music by: Leigh Harline
- Layouts by: Zack Schwartz
- Backgrounds by: Mique Nelson
- Color process: Technicolor
- Production company: Walt Disney Productions
- Distributed by: RKO Radio Pictures
- Release date: May 27, 1938
- Country: United States
- Language: English

Wynken, Blynken & Nod is a 1938 Silly Symphonies animated short film, adapted from Eugene Field's poem of the same name. Like other Symphonies at the time, it utilized the multiplane camera. It was directed by Graham Heid, produced by Walt Disney, and distributed by RKO Radio Pictures. The three children bear similarities to Michael Darling in the 1953 Disney feature film, Peter Pan.

== Plot ==
The three sleepy children sail their shoe-boat; they get briefly trapped in a cloud and then have several problems with their fishing rods. Nod catches a fish-shaped starfish that ends up wriggling in his pants. A starfish snags Wynken and Nod's fishing rods, baited with candy canes, and with each tug, Nod ends up falling overboard.

Nod is quickly rescued thanks to Wynken managing to reel him in. At that moment, the fish-shaped starfish mock Nod, licking him, but Nod defends himself by kicking one. Then another licks him again, and then four of them pull at his pajamas, almost whipping him.

While the fish-shaped stars tease Nod, mistaking him for a candy cane, Blynken's pajamas come undone, exposing his bottom, but he quickly buttons them again, even managing to grab Wynken, who was about to fall.

A comet passes nearby; they manage to catch it in a net and are violently towed until they land in another cloud, where they are tossed about by storms. Nod and Blynken try to hold onto the sail of their boot-shoe, and at that moment Nod's pajamas come undone, but he quickly buttons them up. After so much shaking, the storm finally snaps their mast and sends them flying back to Earth (and to their bed, where it becomes clear that they are really just a kid whose pajamas keep coming undone, exposing his bottom while he sleeps)

== Reception ==
In The Disney Films, Leonard Maltin says: "Wynken, Blynken & Nod is as extravagant as any Disney feature; it set a standard that was probably too extravagant to maintain, with most effort being turned toward feature-film production in the late 1930s. After 1940 these unique cartoons petered out of the Disney production schedule."

== Voice cast ==
- Title song: Mary Moder

== Home media ==
The short was released on December 4, 2001, on Walt Disney Treasures: Silly Symphonies - The Historic Musical Animated Classics. It was released to Disney+ on October 6, 2023.
