= Lullaby Land =

Lullaby Land may refer to:

- Lullaby Land (album), 1993 album by industrial/experimental-rock band Vampire Rodents
- Lullaby Land (film), 1933 Disney animated short film
