= Walt Disney's Timeless Tales =

Series of DVDs by Walt Disney Home Entertainment

Walt Disney's Timeless Tales is a series of DVDs by Walt Disney Home Entertainment. Each release features around one-hour of Disney animated short films featuring classic fairy tale adaptations. In contrast to the chronological nature of the Walt Disney Treasures line, each release includes cartoons in no particular order.

The series appeared in two waves of releases: on August 16, 2005, and January 3, 2006. Another similar life was Walt Disney's It's a Small World of Fun!.

== Releases ==
=== Wave One ===
The first wave of two releases was on August 16, 2005.

==== Volume One ====
1. Three Little Pigs (1933)
2. The Tortoise and the Hare (1935)
3. The Grasshopper and the Ants (1934)
4. The Pied Piper (1933)
5. The Prince and the Pauper (1990)

==== Volume Two ====
1. The Wind in the Willows (1949)
2. The Ugly Duckling (1939)
3. Ferdinand the Bull (1938)
4. The Country Cousin (1936)

=== Wave Two ===
The second wave of three releases was on January 3, 2006.

==== Volume Three ====
1. Casey at the Bat (1946)
2. Little Hiawatha (1937)
3. The Wise Little Hen (1934)
4. The Golden Touch (1935)
5. Morris the Midget Moose (1950)
6. Ben and Me (1953)

== Reception ==
A review of Volume 1 at DVD talk found, "This volume one is an economical way to get the classic The Three Little Pigs and watch some others in a no-fuss, no extras environment." Concerning Volume 2 the same website wrote, "This collection has only four pieces and no real surprises." but that it was "a fine package if one takes into account that there is an ocean of drek out there calling itself wholesome kid entertainment".

Another review of volume 1 praised the "child-oriented presentation of the DVD" and wrote, "Timeless Tales: Volume One delivers a solid hour of animated entertainment via four Silly Symphonies from the early 1930s and the 1990 Mickey Mouse featurette The Prince and the Pauper. All five cartoons boast clever storylines which have kept their sources in circulation for well over a hundred years (Pauper, published in 1881, is also the youngest of the lot in this regard) and fine Disney-style adaptation from two different periods. Whether or not these shorts merit the phrase "timeless" depends on how you feel about this once-thriving and now mostly-dead short film format. The Silly Symphonies, while clearly dated, have endured seven decades and though Pauper has yet to stand such a test of time, it hasn't lost any of its cinematic luster."

A review of volume 3 concluded, "as has been said plenty of times before, the only collectors of the Walt Disney Treasures line who might want to buy this are extreme completists and those who like the idea of playing this cartoon lineup without the need for switching discs and swapping tins."
