= The Golden Touch (film) =

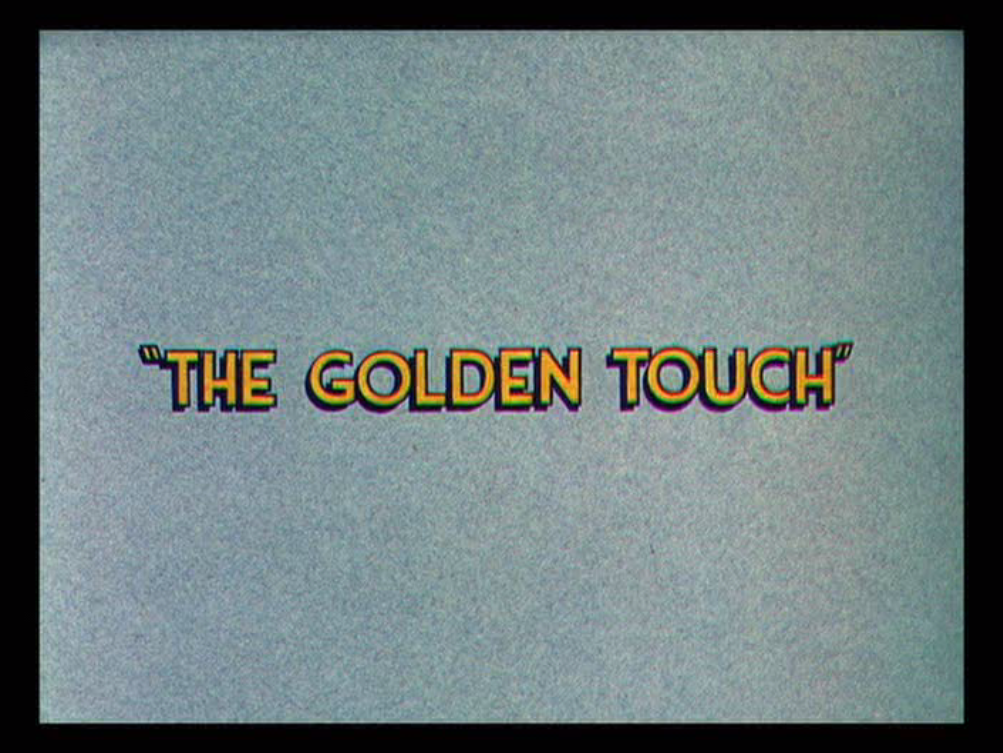
- Title card
- Directed by: Walt Disney
- Story by: Albert Hurter
- Produced by: Walt Disney
- Starring: Billy Bletcher
- Music by: Frank Churchill
- Animation by: Norm Ferguson; Fred Moore
- Production company: Walt Disney Productions
- Distributed by: United Artists
- Release date: March 22, 1935
- Running time: 10 minutes
- Country: United States

The Golden Touch is a Walt Disney produced Silly Symphonies animated short film released in 1935. The story is based on the Greek myth of King Midas, albeit updated into a medieval setting. It was the last film directed by Disney.

== Plot ==
The extremely rich King Midas, overcome with greed and vanity, wishes aloud that everything he touched should turn to gold. An elf named Goldie appears beside him and offers him the "Golden Touch", demonstrating its magical powers by turning Midas's pet cat to gold, and then clapping his hands and snapping his fingers to change it back. Refusing the king's offer to trade everything he possesses for such a gift, Goldie instead warns him that such a power will prove a wicked curse in the end. Midas derides this by exclaiming, "Fiddlesticks! Give me gold! Not advice!", so Goldie gives him the Golden Touch.

At first, Midas is happy with his newfound power and turns his cat, garden, and palace into solid gold. Then he talks to himself in his mirror about turning the Earth, and then the universe, to gold, but then finds out he can no longer eat or drink as his dinner turns to gold when he touches it. Fearing starvation, he asks himself in his mirror, "Is the richest king in all the world to starve to death?" His reflection in his mirror is twisted into a golden skeleton that nods in reply to his question.

Horrified, Midas tries to flee the castle, but as he approaches the castle gate, he sees his shadow morph into a golden grim reaper. Fleeing back to his counting room, Midas summons Goldie, crying, "Take away this golden curse! Don't let me starve! Take everything, my gold, my kingdom for a hamburger sandwich!" Goldie agrees to take back the Golden Touch in exchange for everything Midas possesses, including his castle, his crown (replacing it with a tin can), and even his clothes (only sparing his undergarments). In return, Midas is given the hamburger that he begged for (first touching it to see if Goldie kept his promise). Instead of bemoaning his poverty, Midas devours the hamburger (which came with onions) joyfully, simply because he can eat now.

== Voice cast ==
- Midas: Billy Bletcher
- Goldie: Mary Moder

== Home media ==
The short was released on December 4, 2001, on Walt Disney Treasures: Silly Symphonies - The Historic Musical Animated Classics and on Walt Disney's Timeless Tales/Wave Two/Volume Three in 2006. It was later released on Disney+ in 2021.
