= Father Noah's Ark =

1933 film by Wilfred Jackson

- Title card
- Directed by: Wilfred Jackson
- Based on: Book of Genesis
- Produced by: Walt Disney
- Starring: Allan Watson; J. Delos Jewkes; Lucille La Verne; Walt Disney; The Rhythmettes
- Music by: Leigh Harline
- Color process: Technicolor
- Production company: Walt Disney Productions
- Distributed by: United Artists
- Release date: April 8, 1933
- Running time: 8 minutes
- Country: United States
- Language: English

Father Noah's Ark is a 1933 American animated short film directed by Wilfred Jackson. It is based on the biblical narrative of Noah's Ark as found in the Book of Genesis. It is the 35th film of the Silly Symphonies series. The cartoon was released on April 8, 1933.

== Plot ==
The short begins with the building of the Ark. Father Noah makes the plans for the ark and gives commands for its construction. His sons, Ham, Shem and Japheth "build the ark from dawn to dark and make a lot of noise" with some help from the animals, while their wives load up food supplies to see them through the flood and Noah's wife is washing clothes.

Eventually, the storm rolls in and the animals are summoned, two-by-two, to the ark, purposely leaving two skunks behind. The ark is soon buffeted around by the storm and the ark's occupants praise the Lord. At one point, Noah gets rainwater leaking through the ceiling in his mouth and has to open a porthole to spit it out, whereupon he is chased by a stray lightning bolt, which he redirects through another porthole.

40 days later, the storm recedes and a dove, carrying an olive branch, flies back to Noah and his family to signify that land has been found. They lower the gangway and the animals and their offspring all come back out onto dry land (the ark, in this case, resting atop a tree).

== Reception ==
The Pomp and Circumstance segment of Fantasia 2000, also based on Noah's Ark, makes minor references to this short.

=== 2011 Malaysian broadcast controversy ===
On 24 October 2011, the film was aired on Radio Televisyen Malaysia's TV2 as part of the Disney programme Mickey Mouse and Friends; Muslim viewers in Malaysia strongly objected to the visual portrayal of Noah (also venerated as a prophet in Islam, all prophets in general are discouraged from any depiction for fear of idolatry). RTM released an official apology over the matter not long after, said that it "would be careful in the future" while also stated that it also "hopes that viewers will continue to provide feedback to improve TV2's broadcast content".

== Home media ==
The short was released on December 4, 2001, on Walt Disney Treasures: Silly Symphonies - The Historic Musical Animated Classics and on the UK VHS of Dumbo as a bonus feature.

== Voice cast ==
- Noah: Allan Watson
- Noah's Sons' Wives: The Rhythmettes
- Noah's Wife: Lucille La Verne
- "Who built the ark?": Jesse Delos Jewkes
