= Fred Moore (animator) =

American artist and character animator

- Born: Robert Fred Moore; September 7, 1911; Los Angeles, California, U.S.
- Died: November 23, 1952 (aged 41); Burbank, California, U.S.
- Occupations: Artist and animator
- Employer(s): Walt Disney Productions (1930–1946, 1948–1952); Walter Lantz Productions (1946–1948)

Robert Fred Moore (September 7, 1911 – November 23, 1952), was an American artist and animator for Walt Disney Animation Studios. Often called "Freddie," he was born and raised in Los Angeles, California. Despite limited formal art training, he rose to prominence at Disney very quickly in the early 1930s, due to his great natural talent and the tremendous appeal of his drawings. His drawings are still greatly admired by animators and animation fans.

== Life and career ==
=== Early life and career beginnings ===
Moore was born in Los Angeles and is best known for being the resident specialist in the animation of Mickey Mouse. He is most notable for redesigning the character in 1938 for his landmark role in "The Sorcerer's Apprentice" in Fantasia, a look which remains Mickey's official look to this day. His animation of the earlier Mickey Mouse design was especially memorable in the 1938 short Brave Little Tailor, the last significant appearance of the "pie-eyed" Mickey.

Moore's other significant work at the studio included The Three Little Pigs, on which he was the principal animator; animation supervision of the dwarfs in Snow White and the Seven Dwarfs; most of Lampwick in Pinocchio (all of the poolroom scene and until halfway through his transformation to a donkey); and Timothy the mouse in Dumbo. Lampwick, who had red hair and buck teeth, has been largely believed to be a self-caricaturization of Fred Moore, as he was responsible for much of the character's designs and scenes. Moore animated some scenes of the mice from Cinderella, some scenes of the oysters as well as some of the later scenes of the White Rabbit in Alice In Wonderland, and did the mermaids in the Mermaid Lagoon for Peter Pan.

Moore was well known around the studio for his drawings of innocently sexy, often nude, women, referred to as "Freddie Moore Girls." Some of his girl designs found their way into Disney films: for example, the centaurettes in Fantasia and the teenage girls in the "All the Cats Join In" segment of Make Mine Music. (In "All The Cats Join In", Moore personally animated the sequence at the beginning, when the girl answers the telephone and then quickly showers and dresses, through to her scene putting on lipstick in front of her mirror). Moore's enduring influence can also be seen in the design of Casey's daughters in the 1954 short "Casey Bats Again". His good girl art remains iconic and influential. A model sheet for Ariel in the 1989 Disney film The Little Mermaid made specific distinctions between the design of that character and a "Freddie Moore Girl."

Moore's drawings and design style have come to epitomize the formative years of the studio in between Ub Iwerks' departure in 1930 and the ascension of the "Nine Old Men", after which studio design was dominated by animator Milt Kahl, along with storyboard artist Bill Peet, and later production designer Ken Anderson. During the 1930s, Moore, Art Babbitt, Norm Ferguson, Bill Tytla, and Ham Luske were the dominant Disney animators whose pioneering work culminated in 1937 with the breakthrough of Snow White and the Seven Dwarfs.

Moore was a close friend of fellow animators Ward Kimball and Walt Kelly, though he apparently had a quieter and more reserved nature than either of them. Many surviving gag drawings by Kelly from the period of Pinocchio show Kimball as the corrupt Lampwick, with boyish Moore as Pinocchio. Moore and Kimball were also caricatured as song and dance men in the 1941 Mickey Mouse short The Nifty Nineties. Moore makes a brief (and quiet) live-action appearance in the 1941 feature The Reluctant Dragon, along with Kimball and animator Norm Ferguson during one of the studio tour sequences. Kimball has discussed surreptitiously performing some of Moore's Disney work when Moore was too inebriated to finish it.

He talked little about his family. His daughters were Sue Moore and Melinda Moore. Later on, his daughter Sue had married and had another daughter named Kelly Hall, who now resides in Tacoma, Washington, with her two children. Melinda married and had two children; her son Christian resides in the Bay Area and her daughter Timothia resides in Los Angeles.

=== Brief departure and return to Disney ===
Fred Moore was briefly fired from Disney Studios in 1946 due to his alcoholism. Through former Disney Animator Dick Lundy, he was hired at Walter Lantz Productions, where he redesigned the characters of Woody Woodpecker and Andy Panda during a two-year stint that ended with his return to Disney in 1948 due to Lantz temporarily closing his studio because of financial Issues.

=== Accident and death ===
Moore was already at work animating the mermaids and the lost boys for Peter Pan when both he and his second wife, Virginia, were injured in a traffic accident early on the evening of Saturday, November 22, 1952, when their car was struck head-on while she made a U-turn on a rural highway through Big Tujunga Canyon near the Angeles National Forest. The Moores were reportedly returning from a day spent watching an American football game with fellow Disney artist Jack Kinney. Moore died the following day at St. Joseph's Hospital in Burbank, California, located across the street from the Disney Studios, from a cerebral hemorrhage resulting from a concussion. Moore is interred at Forest Lawn Memorial Park (Hollywood Hills) in a plot overlooking the Disney Studios.

Fred Moore was posthumously inducted as a Disney Legend by the studio in 1995, and posthumously received the animation industry's Winsor McCay Award in 1983.

== Filmography ==
| Year | Title | Credits | Characters |
|---|---|---|---|
| 1933 | Three Little Pigs (Short) | Animator (uncredited) | Pigs |
| 1934 | The Big Bad Wolf (Short) | Animator (uncredited) | |
| 1934 | The Flying Mouse (Short) | Animator (uncredited) | |
| 1935 | The Golden Touch (Short) | Animator (uncredited) | |
| 1935 | Pluto's Judgement Day (Short) | Animator (uncredited) | |
| 1935 | Three Orphan Kittens (Short) | Animator (uncredited) | Kittens (entire kitchen sequence) |
| 1936 | Three Little Wolves (Short) | Animator (uncredited) | |
| 1937 | Snow White and the Seven Dwarfs | Supervising Animator | |
| 1940 | Pinocchio | Animation Director | |
| 1940 | Fantasia | Animation Supervisor - Segments "The Sorcerer's Apprentice" and "The Pastoral Symphony" | |
| 1941 | The Reluctant Dragon | Animator | |
| 1941 | Dumbo | Animation Director | |
| 1943 | Saludos Amigos (Short) | Animator | |
| 1945 | The Three Caballeros | Animator | |
| 1946 | Make Mine Music | Animator | |
| 1947 | Fun and Fancy Free | Directing Animator | |
| 1948 | The Mad Hatter (Short) | Animator | Woody Woodpecker |
| 1948 | Wacky-Bye Baby (Short) | Animator | Woody Woodpecker |
| 1948 | Playful Pelican (Short) | Animator | Andy Panda |
| 1948 | Pixie Picnic (Short) | Animator | |
| 1948 | Wet Blanket Policy (Short) | Animator | Woody Woodpecker |
| 1948 | Wild and Woody! (Short) | Animator | Woody Woodpecker |
| 1949 | The Adventures of Ichabod and Mr. Toad | Character Animator | |
| 1950 | Cinderella | Character Animator | |
| 1950 | The Brave Engineer (Short) | Animator | |
| 1951 | Plutopia (Short) | Animator | |
| 1951 | Alice in Wonderland | Character Animator | |
| 1951 | R'coon Dawg (Short) | Animator | |
| 1951 | Fathers Are People (Short) | Animator | |
| 1952 | Pluto's Party (Short) | Animator | |
| 1952 | Pluto's Christmas Tree (Short) | Animator | |
| 1953 | Peter Pan | Character Animator | |
| 1953 | The Simple Things (Short) | Animator | |
| 1953 | Football Now and Then (Short) | Animator | |
| 1954 | Casey Bats Again (Short) | Animator | |
| 1957 - 1979 | Walt Disney's Wonderful World of Color (TV Series) | Animator - 6 Episodes | |
| 1980 | Mickey Mouse Disco (Short) | Animator | |
| 1987 | The Puppetoon Movie | Puppetoon Creative Artist: United States | |
| 1995 | Frank and Ollie (Documentary) | Caricaturist | |
| 2000 | Fantasia 2000 | Animation Supervisor - Segment "The Sorcerer's Apprentice" | |

== See also ==
- A Trip Through the Walt Disney Studios, a documentary from 1937
