= Grasshopper and the Ants =

- Directed by: Wilfred Jackson
- Story by: Bill Cottrell
- Produced by: Walt Disney
- Starring: Pinto Colvig; Dorothy Compton
- Music by: Leigh Harline
- Animation by: Art Babbitt; Dick Huemer; Albert Hurter
- Color process: Technicolor
- Production company: Walt Disney Productions
- Distributed by: United Artists
- Release date: February 10, 1934; (USA)
- Running time: 8 minutes
- Country: United States
- Language: English

Grasshopper and the Ants is a 1934 American animated short film produced by Walt Disney Productions and released by United Artists. Part of the Silly Symphonies series, the film is an adaptation of The Ant and the Grasshopper, one of Aesop's Fables. It was directed by Wilfred Jackson and stars Pinto Colvig as the voice of the grasshopper Hop. It was later reissued by RKO Radio Pictures as The Grasshopper and the Ants.

The film introduced the song "The World Owes Me a Living" (later "I Owe the World a Living") by Leigh Harline and Larry Morey, which later became associated with the character Goofy who was also voiced by Colvig. According to Leonard Maltin on the Walt Disney Treasures: Silly Symphonies DVD, this was an early example of the idea of having a character turn blue with cold, when full-spectrum Technicolor was still new at the time.

The cartoon is believed to be a commentary on the Great Depression and the New Deal, which at that time had just been introduced by the Roosevelt administration.

== Plot ==
The grasshopper entertains the ant colony after they take him in during the winter.

The grasshopper is playing his fiddle, dancing and eating leaves. He notices some ants working hard collecting food. He laughs and calls an ant to him. He tells the ant that there is food on every tree and he sees no reason to work. He dances and sings that The world owes us a living. The ant begins to dance too. The queen ant arrives, carried in a sedan chair, and sees the ant playing instead of working. The ant notices the queen and immediately goes back to work. The angry queen warns the grasshopper that he will change his tune when winter comes. The grasshopper blithely dismisses the queen's warning, saying that winter is a long way off.

Autumn passes and winter arrives. The grasshopper trudges through the snow, cold and hungry. He finds one withered leaf, but it blows away before he can eat it. Meanwhile, the ants are feasting on their stored food. The grasshopper knocks on their door and collapses. The ants carry him inside and warm and feed him. The queen ant approaches him, and the grasshopper begs to be allowed to stay. She tells him that only those who work may stay, and tells him to take his fiddle. Thinking that he is being dismissed, the grasshopper starts to leave, but when the queen tells him to play the fiddle, he happily does and sings that I owe the world a living!, having acknowledged the ants were right.

== Home media ==
The short was released on December 4, 2001, on Walt Disney Treasures: Silly Symphonies - The Historic Musical Animated Classics, in 2005 on Walt Disney's Timeless Tales Volume 1 and again on Walt Disney Animation Collection: Classic Short Films Volume 5: Wind in the Willows in 2009.

It was released on Blu-Ray in 2009 as a bonus feature on A Bug's Life.

== Voices ==
- Pinto Colvig – Hop the Grasshopper
- Dorothy Compton – Ant Queen
