= Magician Mickey =

1937 Mickey Mouse cartoon

- Theatrical release poster
- Directed by: David Hand
- Produced by: Walt Disney
- Starring: Walt Disney; Clarence Nash; Pinto Colvig; Lee Millar; Ralph Scott
- Music by: Albert Hay Malotte
- Animation by: Johnny Cannon; Ed Love; Les Clark; Bill Roberts; Isadore Klein; Riley Thomson
- Color process: Technicolor
- Production company: Walt Disney Productions
- Distributed by: United Artists
- Release date: February 6, 1937
- Running time: 8 min (one reel)
- Language: English

Magician Mickey is a 1937 Walt Disney Mickey Mouse cartoon, originally released to theaters on February 6, 1937. This was the 92nd Mickey Mouse short to be released, and the third for that year.

Mickey puts on a magic show, but is interrupted by Donald Duck. Mickey gets his revenge on Donald through his tricks.

== Plot ==
At a local theater populated by several dogface audience members, Mickey Mouse performs as a magician, with Goofy as a stagehand.

Mickey does various magic acts to entertain the audience. A jealous Donald Duck starts heckling Mickey's act. Mickey creates red soap bubbles out of his hands, but Donald pops one of them with a slingshot. When he pops the other, it turns into a lobster which attacks him. Donald throws the lobster at Mickey, but he catches it and turns it into a bubble which he then pops.

As Mickey does tricks with playing cards, Donald blows them away with a pair of bellows. However, Mickey turns them into birds and puts them into a birdcage. Mickey fans out cards in his hand, then makes them disappear and points his wand at Donald. This causes Donald to ramble furiously, with cards flying out of his beak (this becomes a recurring gag in the cartoon).

After further misadventures, Donald rushes to Mickey on the stage. He takes Mickey's wand and points it at Mickey, but nothing happens. He furiously shakes the wand and hits it against the floor and then his hand, where it creates an ice cream cone, which spurts ice cream in his face.

Donald then jumps after Mickey, but Mickey catches Donald in his hands and folds him out like a fan and joined paper dolls. He then puts Donald into a pistol and fires him at the table, where he is put into an egg. Mickey throws the egg in his hat, then pours the yolk out which turns into Donald.

Donald then takes Mickey's wand, breaks it in two, and throws it on the floor, but it turns into a cactus-like plant with multiple boxing gloves. It punches Donald off the stage and turns into a hand pointing to a black X mark where Donald stood previously. Donald hits a case containing an axe. He dodges it and several falling objects, and is then hit by a string of light bulbs when he picks up the axe.

After another angry ramble, Donald runs toward Mickey on the stage, but Mickey uses a hoop to turn Donald into a kangaroo and then a walrus. Donald dives into the hoop and emerges from it wearing a swimsuit. He makes a fighting gesture, but the hoop turns him into a chimpanzee. The now-fed up Donald runs up to Mickey and shoots fireworks from Mickey's gun, which lifts Mickey up into the top of the stage and causes Goofy to get tangled up. A final firework rocket causes the stage to collapse in on the three. Mickey and Goofy pop up, unharmed, but Donald is burned from the fireworks and does one more angry ramble, with cards flooding the screen.

== Voice cast ==
- Mickey Mouse: Walt Disney
- Donald Duck: Clarence Nash
- Goofy: Pinto Colvig

== Releases ==
- 1937 - theatrical release
- 1957 - Disneyland, episode #3.15: "All About Magic" (TV)
- c. 1983 - Good Morning, Mickey!, episode #38 (TV)
- c. 1992 - Mickey's Mouse Tracks, episode #18 (TV)
- c. 1992 - Donald's Quack Attack, episode #28 (TV)
- 2011 - Have a Laugh!, episode #24 (TV)

== Home media ==
The short was released on December 4, 2001, on Walt Disney Treasures: Mickey Mouse in Living Color.

Additional releases include:

- 1984 - "Cartoon Classics: Mickey's Crazy Careers" (VHS)
- 2006 - "Funny Factory with Mickey" (DVD)

== See also ==
- Mickey Mouse (film series)
