= The Rhythmettes =

1930s–1940s Hollywood singing trio

The Rhythmettes were a singing trio who provided the vocals on several 1930s and 1940s Hollywood films, including Disney Silly Symphony shorts and The Wizard of Oz (1939).

The original members were Dorothy Compton, Mary Moder and Anna Lou Barnes, the latter of whom left in early on and was replaced with Betty Bruce performing as the third member in the early- to mid-1930s. Beatrice Hagen was also a member at some point. Bruce wrote the musical arrangements for the group.

By 1933, the trio was with Al Pearce's radio show, The Happy Go Lucky Hour, on radio station KHJ in Los Angeles. They performed on stage with the rest of Pearce's group in the United States and Canada.

Compton, Moder, and one other member were heard in Disney's Silly Symphony shorts, including Old King Cole (1933), Lullaby Land (1933), and Funny Little Bunnies (1934). Various members of the Rhythmettes would appear in other shorts, including Birds of a Feather (1931), Three Little Pigs (1933), and The Practical Pig (1939). In addition to singing, individual members performed voicework for characters in several Silly Symphony shorts. Dorothy Compton voiced of Fiddler Pig and Mary Moder voiced Fifer Pig in Three Little Pigs (1933). A 1934 article in Hearst's International-Cosmopolitan reported that the trio "do not broadcast that they are the Three Little Pigs because they want more work at the Disney art shop".

Compton left the trio in 1934. In The Practical Pig (1939), Moder reprised her role as Fifer Pig and Bruce took over Compton's role of Fiddler Pig.

The trio were heard on several songs in The Wizard of Oz, including "Munchkinland" (the vocals after Dorothy arrives in the Munchkin village), a reprise of Dorothy's "Over the Rainbow", and "Optimistic Voices", which plays as Dorothy and her friends escape the field of poppies and approach the Emerald City.

== Selected filmography ==
- Three Little Pigs (1933)
- Birds of a Feather (1931) as hummingbirds and Brox Sister owls
- Old King Cole (1933)
- Lullaby Land (1933)
- Funny Little Bunnies (1934)
- The Practical Pig (1939)
- The Wizard of Oz (1939)
