= Simply Mad About the Mouse: A Musical Celebration of Imagination =

1991 Disney album

Simply Mad About the Mouse: A Musical Celebration of Imagination is a 1991 direct-to-video release showcasing top contemporary singers performing classic Disney songs. Released on September 27, 1991, this 35-minute feature consists of a series of music videos available on VHS and LaserDisc. The music videos were exclusive to the video and were also shown on the Disney Channel.

== Performances ==
The disc features the following performances:

Billy Joel, "When You Wish Upon a Star"
A Disney animator working on drawing a semi-realistic illustration of Joel is confused when the drawing comes alive. The sketchy, comic-book-like Joel proceeds to saunters in-and-out of various scenes of Disney features like Peter Pan, Fantasia, Sleeping Beauty, Pinocchio, and Snow White and the Seven Dwarfs. The character does not directly interact with the existing animation. In one scene, Joel flies off the animator's drawing board, causing papers to scatter in the animator's studio. Additionally, a rotoscoped trumpet player descends the animator’s staircase. When the animator finishes for the day and exits the room, he is depicted as a rotoscoped character in a Disney background painting. Throughout the video, Joel appears in live-action in two separate instances. At the beginning of the video, there is a black-and-white sequence featuring filmmakers in a studio, which bears minimal relevance to the rest of the content. One of the songs featured in the video was nominated for a Grammy in both the Song and Music Video categories.

Ric Ocasek, "Zip-a-Dee-Doo-Dah"
There is little true plot to Ocasek's video, beyond the fact he appears in scenes from Fantasia, The Three Caballeros, Alice in Wonderland, Hawaiian Holiday, Merbabies, Song of the South, and even Dumbo's drunken hallucination from Dumbo. At least one short film is edited. In the video are a non-speaking, non-interacting woman and a guitar player. He is transported in a computer-generated boat.

LL Cool J, "Who's Afraid of the Big Bad Wolf?"
The black-and-white sequence features LL Cool J rapping about the Three Little Pigs, taking on the persona of both the wolf and third pig in first person, at various points in the rap. He is backed up by three African-American singers dancing, each with blonde wigs on, as well as one male backup dancer appearing in shots by himself. The opening of the video features a snippet from Oliver & Company.

Gipsy Kings, "I've Got No Strings"
Features a series of boldly colored animated sequences, with simplified figures dancing to the Latin music. Most of the song is performed in Spanish.

Harry Connick Jr., "The Bare Necessities"
Connick appears as a nouveau-riche happy-go-lucky millionaire in a house full of women and fancy parties. When repossessed, he remains care-free, claiming he can survive with the "bare necessities of life". In the video, the crew repossessing his house sings along with Connick, and dolly carts away some of the female guests. This video is, by far, the most elaborate in terms of set, extras, and choreography. The whole music video was shot at Greystone Mansion in Beverly Hills, California.

Bobby McFerrin, "The Siamese Cat Song"
An array of special effects create otherworldly environments to complement McFerrin's exceptional adaptation and performance. Nominated as one of several songs from this album for a Grammy, it blends music and state-of-the-art animation effects. Includes scenes from Mars and Beyond, Lady and the Tramp, and Fantasia with McFerrin singing.

Soul II Soul featuring Kofi, "Kiss the Girl"
A man and a woman sing on a desert island with a parrot, a group of people dancing in the ocean water, and a beautiful girl dancing with fishes in the background, as clips from The Little Mermaid, Bedknobs and Broomsticks and Fantasia with are shown.

Michael Bolton, "A Dream Is a Wish Your Heart Makes"
This music video uses animation and special effects as projected landscapes that Michael Bolton performs in. A full orchestra supports his rich rendition while cascading classic images of the best of the Disney Vault wash the stage transforming the viewer inside the classic movies Cinderella, Snow White and the Seven Dwarfs, Fantasia, and Sleeping Beauty footage intermixed with performance and live-action.

== Production notes ==
As evidenced in the descriptions of the music videos, while Simply Mad included new animation, it made great use of existing animated footage. Most new animation in Simply Mad is rotoscoped, a technique highly disregarded by Disney's animators, who, while sometimes referring to video footage for reference, prefer to create their character's motion from scratch.

The video begins in a set created of "the Disney Vault", where the camera pans around various objects and pictures, including "props" from the animated movies, such as Cinderella's glass slipper, or the submerged skull from The Rescuers. An animator's pencil drawing of Sorcerer Mickey slowly comes alive, and enchants five musical notes out of a baton; the notes proceed to whip around the room at varying speeds. The vault is entered through a dark and slightly industrial side; at the end, it exits onto an English garden.

Created by Garen Entertainment and Stellar X Productions, it was distributed by Buena Vista Home Video, the Walt Disney Company's distribution company.

An album of the music was created by Columbia Records, and released on LP, cassette and Compact Disc. Also on the record was En Vogue with "Someday My Prince Will Come" and Kirk Whalum with "Mad About the Wolf".

The title is not currently in stores, but is available through digital download distribution.

== Credits ==
- Based on a material idea by B. A. Robertson
- Executive producer: Scott Garen
- Producer: Rhaz Zeisler, B. A. Robertson
- Executive music producer: B. A. Robertson
- Co-executive music producer: Rick Chertoff
- Animation effects: Rhaz Zeisler
- Choreography: Rhaz Zeisler
- Writer: Scott Garen, Rhaz Zeisler
- Director: Scott Garen
- Supervising Producer / 1st AD: Morgan D. Smith
