= Walt Disney's It's a Small World of Fun! =

Walt Disney's It's a Small World of Fun! is a series of DVDs by Walt Disney Home Entertainment. Each release would feature around one hour of Disney animated short films with international settings. As opposed to the chronological nature of the Walt Disney Treasures line, each release would feature various cartoons in no particular order. The series featured two waves of releases, on May 16, 2006, and February 13, 2007. Another similar line was Walt Disney's Timeless Tales.

== Releases ==
=== Wave One ===
The first wave of two releases came on May 16, 2006.

==== Volume 1 ====
1. The Flying Gauchito (1945)
2. In Dutch (1946)
3. Goliath II (1960)
4. Mickey Down Under (1948)
5. African Diary (1945)
6. A Cowboy Needs a Horse (1956)
7. Grievance of a Starmaker (2002)

==== Volume 2 ====
1. Pedro (1943)
2. The Olympic Champ (1942)
3. Peter and the Wolf (1946)
4. Brave Little Tailor (1938)
5. Crazy with the Heat (1947)
6. Susie the Little Blue Coupe (1952)

=== Wave Two ===
The second wave of four releases came on February 13, 2007.

==== Volume 3 ====
1. The Legend of Johnny Appleseed (1948)
2. Pueblo Pluto (1949)
3. Tiger Trouble (1945)
4. The Fox Hunt (1938)
5. Alpine Climbers (1936)
6. Hello Aloha (1952)

==== Volume 4 ====
1. The Reluctant Dragon (1941)
2. Polar Trappers (1938)
3. The Goddess of Spring (1934)
4. For Whom the Bulls Toil (1953)
5. The Little House (1952)

== Reception ==
Volume 2 is described as follows by Jamie S. Rich "Like the first volume, all but one of the cartoons ("Crazy with the Heat" with Donald Duck and Goofy) are available on other discs. Given that they are all really strong selections, however, makes the disc a little more desirable."

A review of vol. 4 at DVD Talk, wrote, " if you're looking for a great way to introduce a small child to vintage Disney animation, and you don't particularly care about being a completist, by all means, I recommend buying (it) " Another review of the volume lamented the "unnecessary frugality (of) the package."

Conceding, as did all reviewers, that "The Disney folks display true entrepreneurial genius when it comes to repurposing their precious library of classic animation.", the Video Librarian gave "Volume 1" 3 stars out of 4, and recommended the compilation, particularly for the presence of "Grievance of a Starmarker", "a charming, anti-pollution short (...), based on an award-winning Japanese story, and never seen outside Japan".
