= Who's Afraid of the Big Bad Wolf? =

Song from The Three Little Pigs in Silly Symphonies

"Who's Afraid of the Big Bad Wolf?" is a popular song written by Frank Churchill with additional lyrics by Ann Ronell, which originally featured in the 1933 Disney cartoon Three Little Pigs, where it was sung by Fiddler Pig and Fifer Pig (voiced by Mary Moder and Dorothy Compton, respectively) as they arrogantly believe the Big Bad Wolf (voiced by Billy Bletcher) is not a serious threat. The song created a market for future Disney tunes and led to a contract with Irving Berlin Publishing Co. that same year, securing the sheet music rights over Mickey Mouse and the Silly Symphonies. The song's theme made it a huge hit during the second half of 1933. As Neal Gabler wrote in his 2007 biography of Walt Disney, the song "indisputably became the nation's new anthem, its cheerful whoop hurled in the face of hard times." It remains one of the most well-known Disney songs, being covered by numerous artists and musical groups.

== Re-use by Disney ==
The song was reused in the sequels to Three Little Pigs, and its writing was re-enacted in the "Cavalcade of Songs" episode on the Disneyland television series in 1955. It featured in the Sing Along Songs video I Love to Laugh and has been included in numerous Disney recordings.

Disneyland Records produced a re-recording of the song in 1958, released concurrently as a single in Disney's "Wonderful Records" series of 45s and on the Mickey Mouse Club LP "Four Disney Stories", conducted by Tutti Camarata. It was a re-enactment of the original cartoon in audio, with noticeable differences being all three pigs voiced by Gloria Wood (unlike the originals, where Practical Pig was voiced by Pinto Colvig), the Big Bad Wolf having a more menacing voice (this time by Jimmy MacDonald), and a few additional verses and dialogue that was not present in the original cartoon. This version was also released on an album in the early 1960s entitled "The Story and Songs of Walt Disney's Three Little Pigs" and a few other compilation albums, and also included on Disney's read-along book-and-audio adaptations of the cartoon.

== Contextual similarities ==
Significant similarities can be found in the British early 20th century chasing game Who's Afraid of Black Peter? which is based on the ancient children's game of Black Man (Who Is Afraid of the Black Man?) that had been described in 1796 by German educator Johann Christoph Friedrich GutsMuths. In the game the catcher asks the runners "Who's Afraid of Black Peter?", whereupon the runners answer "Not I!" After the dialogue Black Man or Black Peter seek to catch their victims.

German historian and non-fiction author Susanna Partsch confirms a possible connection between the game of Black Man and Ronell's and Churchill's lyrical concept while Isabel Vollmuth, Portuguese-German professor at the Faculty of Interdisciplinary Studies (University of Applied Sciences in Landshut), describes Who's Afraid of the Big Bad Wolf? as an offshoot of the game-based children's rhyme. Additionally, the song was the inspiration for the title of Edward Albee's 1962 stage play Who's Afraid of Virginia Woolf?

== Cover versions ==
=== LL Cool J version ===
"Who's Afraid of the Big Bad Wolf?"

Single by LL Cool J

from the album Simply Mad About the Mouse
- B-side: "I Need a Beat"; "I Can't Live Without My Radio"
- Released: July 7, 1991
- Recorded: 1991
- Genre: Golden age hip hop; new jack swing; children's music
- Length: 3:50
- Label: Columbia
- Songwriters: Ann Ronell; Frank Churchill
- Producers: B. A. Robertson; DJ Eddie F; LL Cool J

LL Cool J singles chronology
"6 Minutes of Pleasure" (1991)	"Who's Afraid of the Big Bad Wolf?" (1991)	"Strictly Business" (1991)

"Who's Afraid of the Big Bad Wolf?" was covered by American rapper LL Cool J on the Disney album Simply Mad About the Mouse: A Musical Celebration of Imagination. It was released as a single in 1991 for Columbia Records and was produced by DJ Eddie F and LL Cool J. It sampled Michael Jackson's "Billie Jean". LL Cool J's version did not make it to the Billboard charts.

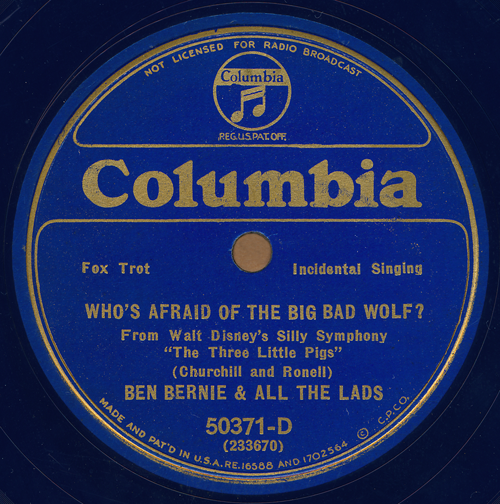
Ben Bernie's 1933 version

==== Track listing ====
A-side

1. "Who's Afraid of the Big Bad Wolf?" – 3:50

B-side

1. "I Need a Beat" – 4:31
2. "I Can't Live Without My Radio" – 5:27

==== Charts ====
Chart performance for "Who's Afraid of the Big Bad Wolf?" by LL Cool J
Chart (1992)	Peak position
Australia (ARIA)	100

=== Other cover versions ===
The song has been covered by many artists, including:

- In 1933 by Harry Reser and his Eskimos with vocal by Loretta Clemens.
- In 1933 by American jazz violinist Ben Bernie.
- In 1933 by American bandleader Don Bestor.
- In 1933 by American composer Victor Young.
- In 1934, it was sung by Warren William and Ginger Rogers in the Warner Brothers film Upperworld.
- In 1934 by French singer Jean Sablon entitled "Prenez Garde Au Méchant Loup!".
- In 1934 by Three X Sisters on the film soundtrack Six of a Kind with W.C. Fields.
- Duke Ellington, an American pianist and composer.
- Rita Pavone, an Italian rock/ballad singer.
- In 1936 by Fredo Gardoni, Manuel Puig and their orchestra as a foxtrot.
- Charlie and his Orchestra recorded a German version in English during World War II with propaganda lyrics.
- In 1955 by Jack Pleis (and his orchestra) on his album Music from Disneyland.
- In 1961 by Pinky and Perky, an animated children's TV series on the 7-inch record Children's Favourites.
- In 1963 by American singer Barbra Streisand on her album The Barbra Streisand Album.
- In 1985 as a musical sample refrain throughout Schoolly D's rap song "Do It Do It".
- Chucho Avellanet, a Puerto Rican singer and comedian.
- In 2006 by American R&B boy band B5 on the album DisneyMania 4.
- In 2007 by German musician Max Raabe and his Palast Orchester on the album Heute Nacht oder nie, and as a regular song on their setlist.
