= The Practical Pig =

- Directed by: Dick Rickard
- Story by: Larry Clemmons
- Produced by: Walt Disney
- Starring: Billy Bletcher; Tommy Wiggins; Betty Bruce; Mary Moder; Tom Buchanan; Ralph Hansell; Richard Holland; Donald Kearin; Leone Le Doux
- Music by: Frank Churchill; Paul J. Smith
- Animation by: Preston Blair; Ollie Johnston; John Lounsbery; Frank Thomas
- Layouts by: Thor Putnam
- Color process: Technicolor
- Production company: Walt Disney Productions
- Distributed by: RKO Radio Pictures
- Release date: February 24, 1939 (United States)
- Running time: 8 minutes
- Country: United States
- Language: English

The Practical Pig is an animated short film produced by Walt Disney. It was released on February 24, 1939, and was directed by Dick Rickard. It was the fourth and final cartoon starring The Three Pigs; while promoted as a Silly Symphonies cartoon, it is otherwise not part of that series. Like its predecessors, The Practical Pig incorporates the song "Who's Afraid of the Big Bad Wolf?". Unlike its predecessors however, its title cards labeled it as a standalone Three Little Pigs cartoon, suggesting that they were to get their own series of cartoons. It is also the second-to-last Silly Symphony released.

== Plot ==
Practical Pig is hard at work building a new anti-wolf contraption, this time a lie detector. His two brothers, Fiddler and Fifer Pig decide to go swimming, despite Practical's warning about the Big Bad Wolf lurking by the pond. The Big Bad Wolf disguises as a mermaid to lure Fiddler and Fifer and captures them and brings them to an old windmill where his sons the Three Little Wolves are waiting for their dinner, but tells them they must not eat until he captures Practical. The Wolf plans to entrap Practical as well using a fake letter requesting help by his brothers. While the wolf is off to capture Practical, the Three Little Wolves start early to put the two pigs into a pan and prepare to bake them into a pie. The Wolf, disguised as a messenger boy, blows his cover when he blows the fake letter under Practical's door. Realizing the wolf is up to his tricks and his brothers have been captured, Practical tries out his new invention. As the wolf attempts to lure Practical, the welcome mat opens under the wolf's feet, and the wolf falls into the pit below. He is next seen strapped in a chair in the basement, captured, as Practical demands to know his brothers' whereabouts. The wolf first he claims he has never heard of Practical's brothers and secondly he claims he hasn't seen them, but the lie detector detects his lies and punishes the wolf with brushes to wash his mouth out with soap and spank him in each case. The wolf then lastly tries to fool the machine by claiming that he and Practical are pals, but the lie detector sees through this and gives him the works (a spanking and a mouth washing, along with his knuckles being whacked with rulers, all at once).

Back at the wolves' hideout, the Three Little Wolves are about to bake Fifer and Fiddler into the oven as the two pigs tell them they'll be sorry when their father comes home. One of the wolf cubs uses pepper but the lid accidentally comes off and this causes the two pigs to sneeze so strong, the pie crust is duffed off and into the wolves splatting and trapping them against a wall. With the wolf cubs trapped, Fiddler and Fifer escape and rush back to Practical's house.

The lie detector punishes the Wolf harder and harder until he finally tells the truth, saying "They're in the old... the old mill". He is then shot out of the house with a firecracker and seemingly explodes in the sky. Practical prepares to go save his brothers when Fiddler and Fifer burst in. When Practical scolds them for defying his warnings, they tell him that they didn't go swimming, at which point the lie detector springs into action, flipping them over, dropping their shorts, and gives them a spanking. When Practical tells his brothers "Remember, this hurts me worse than it does you!", the lie detector ends up interpreting what he just said as a lie and gives him a spanking as well, much to his chagrin at iris out.

== Voice cast ==
Principal voices

- Billy Bletcher as Big Bad Wolf
- Tommy Wiggins as Practical Pig
  - Was later redubbed by Pinto Colvig
- Dorothy Compton as Fifer Pig
- Mary Moder as Fiddler Pig

Additional voices

- Tom Buchanan
- Ralph Hansell
- Richard Holland
- Donald Kearin
- Leone Le Doux as Three Little Wolves

== Comic adaptation ==
The Silly Symphony Sunday comic strip ran a three-month-long adaptation of The Practical Pig from May 1 to August 7, 1938.

== Reception ==
The Film Daily wrote: "The musical effects here heighten the comedy to howling proportions... While lacking a hit tune, this edition of the Three Pigs is a delightful bit of nonsense."

== Home media ==
The short was released on December 4, 2001, on Walt Disney Treasures: Silly Symphonies - The Historic Musical Animated Classics, as an easter egg in the options menu of Disc 1. It has also been released as a bonus feature on the British VHS edition of Dumbo.
