= Three Little Pigs (film) =

1933 film by Burt Gillett

- Title card
- Directed by: Burt Gillett
- Based on: The Three Little Pigs
- Produced by: Walt Disney
- Starring: Pinto Colvig; Billy Bletcher; Mary Moder; Dorothy Compton
- Music by: Frank Churchill
- Color process: Technicolor
- Production company: Walt Disney Productions
- Distributed by: United Artists
- Release date: May 25, 1933
- Running time: 8 minutes
- Country: United States
- Language: English
- Budget: $22,000
- Box office: $250,000

Three Little Pigs is a 1933 American animated short film directed by Burt Gillett. Based on the fable of the same name, it is the 36th film of the Silly Symphony series. It premiered at the Radio City Music Hall as a short subject to Radio City's release of the First National Pictures film Elmer, the Great on May 25, 1933. The short cost $22,000 and grossed $250,000.

Three Little Pigs won the 1934 Academy Award for Best Animated Short Film. In 1994, it was voted #11 of the 50 Greatest Cartoons of all time by members of the animation field. In 2007, Three Little Pigs was selected for preservation in the United States National Film Registry by the Library of Congress as being "culturally, historically, or aesthetically significant".

== Plot ==
Fifer, Fiddler, and Practical Pig are three brothers who each build their own houses with different materials. Fifer and Fiddler quickly build their houses out of hay and sticks so they can have fun and play music, disregarding their houses' lack of security. Practical builds his house out of bricks and warns his brothers about the Big Bad Wolf, but they mock him for spending time on construction and sing "Who's Afraid of the Big Bad Wolf?" As they are singing, the Wolf ambushes them, and both pigs retreat to their respective houses. The Wolf effortlessly blows down the first two houses, forcing Fifer and Fiddler to take refuge in Practical's house. When the Wolf fails to blow down Practical's house, he attempts to enter via the chimney, only to fall into a vat of boiling water to which Practical has added turpentine. Shrieking in pain, the Wolf runs away, and the pigs celebrate their victory.

== Voice cast ==
- Billy Bletcher as the Big Bad Wolf
- Pinto Colvig as Practical Pig and the Big Bad Wolf's Jewish peddler impression (the latter was removed in later re-releases)
- Dorothy Compton as Fifer Pig
- Mary Moder as Fiddler Pig

== Reaction and legacy ==
The cartoon premiered on May 25, 1933 at Radio City Music Hall in New York City.

The cartoon was remarkably successful with audiences of the day, so much that theaters ran the cartoon for months after its debut, to great financial response. The cartoon is still considered to be the most successful animated short ever made, and remained on top of animation until Walt Disney was able to boost Mickey's popularity further by making him a top merchandise icon by the end of 1934.

Animator Chuck Jones observed: "That was the first time that anybody ever brought characters to life [in an animated cartoon]. They were three characters who looked alike and acted differently." Other animation historians, particularly admirers of Winsor McCay, would dispute the word "first", but Jones was not referring to personality as such but to characterization through posture and movement. Fifer and Fiddler Pig are frivolous and care-free; Practical Pig is cautious and earnest. The reason for why the film's story and characters were so well developed was that Disney had already realized the success of animated films depended upon telling emotionally gripping stories that would grab the audience and not let go. This realization led to an important innovation around the time Pigs was in development: a "story department", separate from the animators, with storyboard artists who would be dedicated to working on a "story development" phase of the production pipeline. Reputedly, Walt Disney is said to have used Broadway producer Jed Harris as his basis for the Big Bad Wolf characterization.

The moderate (but not blockbuster) success of the further "Three Pigs" cartoons was seen as a factor in Walt Disney's decision not to rest on his laurels, but instead to continue to move forward with risk-taking projects, such as the multiplane camera and the first feature-length animated film. Disney's slogan, often repeated over the years, was "You can't top pigs with pigs."

=== Controversy ===
At one point in the film, the Big Bad Wolf attempts to trick the pigs by masquerading as a Fuller Brush salesman. In the original 1933 release, the Wolf's disguise is evocative of a stereotypical Jewish man; he wears a mask with an exaggerated nose and speaks with a thick Yiddish accent, saying, "I'm the Fuller Brush man... I'm giving a free sample!" According to animation historian Jim Korkis, the filmmakers chose this stereotype because Jewish salesmen were commonplace in the early twentieth century, and they felt that the pigs would feel safe around someone whose religious dietary laws forbade the consumption of pork.

The "Fuller Brush man" scene from the original 1933 release of the film (left) and from the 1948 reissue (right)

Shortly after the film's release, Rabbi J.X. Cohen (the director of the American Jewish Congress) wrote angrily to Walt Disney, demanding that the scene be removed. Roy O. Disney, speaking on Walt's behalf, told Cohen that the studio had no intention of disparaging any group, and that the caricature was simply a reflection of how "many well-known Jewish comedians portray themselves in vaudeville, stage, and screen characterizations".

When the film was reissued in 1948, Jack Hannah and his unit reanimated the scene to remove the Wolf's mask. Hannah stated that Walt Disney ordered these changes because he felt that the joke was no longer funny and potentially harmful. In a later edit, the Wolf's dialogue was redubbed to remove his Yiddish accent, with the line "I'm giving a free sample" changed to "I'm working my way through college".

== Song ==
The original song composed by Frank Churchill for the cartoon, "Who's Afraid of the Big Bad Wolf?", was a best-selling single, mirroring the people's resolve against the "big bad wolf" of the Great Depression; the song actually became something of an anthem of the Great Depression. When the Nazis began expanding the boundaries of Germany in the years preceding World War II, the song was used to represent the complacency of the Western world in allowing Führer Adolf Hitler to make considerable acquisitions of territory without going to war; it was also notably used in Disney animations for the Canadian war effort.

The song was further used as the inspiration for the title of the 1963 play Who's Afraid of Virginia Woolf? and its 1966 film adaptation, though neither the play nor the film have any further relation to the song or the cartoon.

== Home media ==
In the United States, the short was first released on VHS, Betamax, and LaserDisc in 1984 as part of its Cartoon Classics home video series. It came out on VHS again in the US as part of the Favorite Stories collection in 1995 and in the UK in the spring of 1996 as part of the Disney Storybook Favourites series, the latter with (possibly in error) the Jewish peddler animation restored, albeit with the reworked dialogue.

It was released on December 4, 2001 (along with its sequels) as part of the Walt Disney Treasures: Silly Symphonies DVD,. The Region 1 releases contained the 1948 re-animated version, while the Region 2 and Region 4 releases again retained the Jewish peddler scene but with the reworked dialogue. According to Disney Treasures host and curator, Leonard Maltin, it was his call to use the re-animated footage, a decision he later regretted: "I don't know that I would make the same decision I made then... I decided [since] this was our very first release - one of four DVD sets that kicked off the series - and I feared showing the Jewish peddler [scene]... would be a turn off and would upset enough people to push them away from watching these vintage cartoons. So I took what I will call ... the coward's way out at that time. I don't know [if] that was the right decision or not."

The Disney+ release of the short, however, uses the altered animation in all regions.

It was later included in Walt Disney's Timeless Tales, Vol. 1, released on August 16, 2005 (featuring the edited version in the US Silly Symphonies set), which also featured The Pied Piper (1933), The Grasshopper and the Ants (1934), The Tortoise and the Hare (1935) and The Prince and the Pauper (1990).

== Sequels and later appearances ==
- Disney produced several sequels to Three Little Pigs, though none were nearly as successful as the original:
  - The first of them was The Big Bad Wolf, also directed by Burt Gillett and first released on April 14, 1934.
  - In 1936, a second cartoon starring the Three Little Pigs and the Big Bad Wolf followed, with a story based on The Boy Who Cried Wolf. This short was entitled Three Little Wolves and introduced the Big Bad Wolf's three pup sons, all of whom just as eager for a taste of the pigs as their father.
  - A third cartoon, The Practical Pig, was released in 1939 as the first installment of a planned Three Little Pigs series (two months before the final short in the series, The Ugly Duckling). In this short, Fifer and Piper (again despite Practical's warning), go swimming but are captured by the Big Bad Wolf, who then goes after Practical only to be caught in Practical's newly built Lie Detector machine.
  - In 1941, a fourth cartoon, The Thrifty Pig, was distributed by the National Film Board of Canada. In this cartoon, which consists largely of reused footage from the original cartoon, Practical Pig builds his house out of Canadian war bonds, and the Big Bad Wolf representing Nazi Germany is unable to blow his house down.
- Fiddler Pig, Fifer Pig and the Big Bad Wolf make cameo appearances in the 1988 film Who Framed Roger Rabbit.
- 1963 South American feature, Cri-Cri el Grillito Cantor (Chi-Chi, the Singing Cricket). In it, the Three Little Pigs sort-of become The Three Caballeros
- Characters from the short also appeared in the television series House of Mouse and its direct-to-video films Mickey's Magical Christmas: Snowed in at the House of Mouse (2001) and Mickey's House of Villains (2002). In the second episode of the series ("Big Bad Wolf Daddy"), the Wolf is portrayed as a popular jazz trumpeter with the stage name "Big Bad Wolf Daddy" and the pigs play as his backup band. This possibly may have been an attempt to parody the Warner Bros. cartoon Three Little Bops. The episode "Pete's House of Villains" also includes a short starring the Big Bad Wolf teaching his son how to hunt the pigs.
- The four characters of the short appear along with other Walt Disney Animation Studios characters in the short film Once Upon a Studio.
- The pigs and the Big Bad Wolf appear as playable characters in the video game Disney Magic Kingdoms, as well as an attraction based on the pigs' houses.

== Comic adaptations ==
The Silly Symphony Sunday comic strip ran a seven-month-long continuation of Three Little Pigs called "The Further Adventures of the Three Little Pigs" from January 18 to August 23, 1936. This was followed by another storyline called "The Practical Pig" from May 1 to August 7, 1938.

The anthology comic book Walt Disney's Comics and Stories introduced a new character, Lil Bad Wolf (the son of the Big Bad Wolf), in issue #52 (January 1945). He was a constant vexation to his father (the Big Bad Wolf) because the little son was not actually bad. His favorite playmates, in fact, were the Three Pigs. New stories about Lil Bad Wolf appeared regularly in WDC&S for seven years, with the last one appearing in issue #259 (April 1962).

== See also ==
- List of Disney animated films based on fairy tales
- Blitz Wolf
- The Windblown Hare
