= Three Little Wolves (film) =

1936 animated short film by David Hand

- Directed by: David Hand
- Produced by: Walt Disney
- Starring: Alice Ardell; Billy Bletcher; Pinto Colvig; Leone Ledoux
- Music by: Frank Churchill
- Animation by: Norm Ferguson; Fred Moore; Eric Larson; Bill Roberts
- Layouts by: Ferdinand Horvath
- Backgrounds by: Mique Nelson
- Color process: Technicolor
- Production company: Walt Disney Productions
- Distributed by: United Artists
- Release date: April 18, 1936
- Running time: 9 minutes
- Country: United States
- Language: English

Three Little Wolves is a Silly Symphonies animated short film. Produced by Walt Disney and directed by Dave Hand, the short was released on April 18, 1936. It was the third Silly Symphonies short starring the Three Little Pigs. It is loosely based on The Boy Who Cried Wolf. It introduces the Big Bad Wolf's sons, the Three Little Wolves, all of them just as eager for a taste of the pigs as their father.

== Plot ==
The Big Bad Wolf as Bo Peep

While the Big Bad Wolf is describing to his three sons the edible parts of a pig, Fifer Pig and Fiddler Pig discover a wolf alarm, which is in the form of a horn. Then they discover their brother Practical Pig building a contraption called a Wolf Pacifier. Fifer Pig and Fiddler Pig play around with the wolf alarm to get Practical's attention, and when he discovers that it was just a trick, he warns his brothers that if they get caught by the Wolf and blow the wolf alarm, he will think it is a trick.

However, the Big Bad Wolf and his three sons are stalking Fifer Pig and Fiddler Pig. The Wolf disguises himself as Little Bo Peep and sadly tells the pigs that he/she lost his/her sheep and doesn't know where to find them. Then the pigs discover the Wolf's three sons disguised as sheep, and they all run home to their cave. Then the Wolf locks the door and swallows the key. Initially, the pigs are embarrassed, thinking that "Bo Peep" has romantic intentions, but the wolves spring their trap and overwhelm the pigs. They try to blow the wolf alarm, but Practical Pig dismisses it as a trick (as he forewarned his brothers earlier). Soon Fifer Pig and Fiddler Pig are put in a roasting pan by the wolves, who repeatedly blow the wolf alarm. Still hoping for Practical Pig to come to the rescue, the pigs challenge the wolf cub blowing the wolf alarm to blow it really loudly. He tries to, but he can't, and the pigs tell him that it was just a "sissy blow". To prove what the wolf family is made of, the Big Bad blows the horn himself. This time, Practical Pig realizes his brothers are in danger for real and hurries to the rescue, pulling the newly completed Wolf Pacifier along behind him.

While the Wolf is about to put the pigs in the oven, he hears a knock at the door. It is Practical Pig disguised as an Italian vegetable peddler giving a free sample on tomatoes, and the Wolf accepts the offer and comes out. He tells him: "Let me have it", but Practical Pig throws a tomato in the Wolf's face instead. The Wolf angrily chases Practical Pig into the Wolf Pacifier, resulting in the Wolf getting assaulted by the contraption's many mechanisms: buzz-sawed, smashed on the head by rolling pins, kicked by boots, punched by boxing gloves, tarred, feathered, and shot out of a cannon, with his sons following him. The pigs emerge from the wolves' den, playing Who's Afraid of the Big Bad Wolf? patriotically, with Fifer Pig playing a flute, Fiddler Pig playing a drum, and Practical Pig holding a white flag, which is the Wolf's pair of Bo Peep bloomers.

== Voice cast ==
- Billy Bletcher as Big Bad Wolf
- Pinto Colvig as Practical Pig
- Dorothy Compton as Fifer Pig
- Mary Moder as Fiddler Pig
- Allyce Ardell and Leone Ledoux as Little Wolves

== Symbolism ==
While Disney produced the sequels in order to capitalize on the success of the Three Little Pigs as characters, this film in particular was also a symbolic message about the threatening danger of European fascism, and can be seen as an indication of the levels of fear and patriotism it aroused in the American populace. In the opening scene, the Big Bad Wolf is instructing his three rowdy wolf pups in "German", pointing to a chart of pork cuts and saying "Ist das nicht ein Sausage Meat", etc., reinforcing the interpretation that he is a stand-in for Adolf Hitler.

While the hapless Fifer and Fiddler have their naval garb, musical instruments, and professed bravado—a possible critique of European military allies who were unable to stop Hitler's advances—their confidence cannot save them from being trussed and on the verge of being deposited in the oven by the time that Practical Pig comes to their rescue. Practical Pig, the industrious "American" brother, in workman's overalls, relies on the "Italian" character for distraction, and while the Wolf is focused on his free sample of tomatoes, he is pulled into an elaborate mechanical contraption, which points to the idea that technological superiority is the secret to winning the impending war. At one point, while receiving the mechanized pummeling from the machine, the Wolf's hair is parted and slicked down the center, producing a brief resemblance to Hitler.

== Comic adaptation ==
The Silly Symphony Sunday comic strip ran a seven-month-long adaptation of Three Little Wolves called "The Further Adventures of the Three Little Pigs" from January 19 to August 23, 1936.

== Home media ==
The short was released on December 4, 2001, on Walt Disney Treasures: Silly Symphonies - The Historic Musical Animated Classics.
