= Dorothy Compton =

American actress

Dorothy Compton (December 15, 1904 – October 17, 1997) was an American voice actress. An early friend of Walt Disney, she made her first acting debut in The Three Little Pigs (1933) as the voice of Fifer Pig. From 1933 onward she made more appearances in the next 3 installments of the Three Little Pigs: The Big Bad Wolf (1934), The Three Little Wolves (1936) and The Practical Pig (1939) along with minor appearances in It's Great to Be Alive (1933) and I Married an Angel (1942).

She was a member of the vocal trio The Rhythmettes, which also included Beatrice Hagen and Mary Moder.

After her time with the Rhythmettes, she became a member of Ted Fiorito's Debutantes.

Compton was married to Robert Ball Morton. Compton died on October 17, 1997 at the age of 92 in Wichita, Kansas.
