= Frank Churchill =

American composer (1901–1942)

- Born: Frank Edwin Churchill; October 20, 1901; Rumford, Maine, U.S.
- Died: May 14, 1942 (aged 40) Castaic, California, U.S.
- Occupations: Composer, songwriter
- Instrument: Piano
- Years active: 1916–1942

Frank Edwin Churchill (October 20, 1901 – May 14, 1942) was an American film composer and songwriter. He wrote music for many classic films produced by Walt Disney Productions, including Snow White and the Seven Dwarfs, Dumbo and Bambi.

== Early life and education ==
Churchill was born on October 20, 1901, in Rumford, Maine, the son of Clara E. (Curtis) and Andrew J. Churchill.

Churchill began his career playing piano in cinemas at the age of 15 in Ventura, California. After dropping out of medical studies at UCLA to pursue a career in music, he became an accompanist at the Los Angeles radio station KNX (AM) in 1924.

== Career ==
He joined Disney in 1930 to replace Carl W. Stalling, who left for Ub Iwerks' studio, as one of the studio's composers alongside musical director Bert Lewis and later Leigh Harline. His song for Three Little Pigs, "Who's Afraid of the Big Bad Wolf", was a huge commercial success.

In 1937, he was chosen to score Disney's first full-length animated feature, Snow White and the Seven Dwarfs with Paul Smith and Leigh Harline. His catchy, artfully written songs played a large part in the film's initial success and continuing popularity.

Because of the success of Peter Pan when those two were in production, he shared credit with Jack Lawrence for the deleted song "Never Smile at a Crocodile" from Peter Pan. In 1942, Churchill and fellow composer Oliver Wallace won an Oscar in the category "Scoring of a Musical Picture" for cowriting the score for Dumbo. He also shared an Oscar nomination with Ned Washington for the song "Baby Mine" from Dumbo for Best Song. A year later, Churchill received two posthumous Oscar nominations; the first for cowriting the score to Bambi with Edward Plumb, and the second for cowriting the song "Love is a Song" from Bambi with lyricist Larry Morey.

== Death ==
Churchill died by suicide on May 14, 1942, at his ranch north of Los Angeles in Castaic. He is purported to have died "at the piano" of a self-inflicted gunshot wound to the chest. Although there is some speculation that his suicide was a result of negative discourse with Walt Disney regarding his latest scores for Bambi, it was more likely due to his deep depression and bout with heavy drinking after the deaths of two of his closest friends and fellow Disney orchestra members who had died earlier that year within a month of each other. He was survived by his wife Carolyn and his daughter Corrine. He was buried in Glendale's Forest Lawn Memorial Park Cemetery.

== Sources ==
- Disney Legends: Frank Churchill
