= Mary Moder =

American actress

Mary Moder (November 28, 1905 – July 11, 1993) was an American voice actress for The Walt Disney Company known for the voice of the Fiddler Pig in the Three Little Pigs short subjects. She was a member of the vocal trio the Rhythmettes, which also included Beatrice Hagen and Dorothy Compton. She was born on November 28, 1905, in Nebraska, and died of a heart attack on July 11, 1993, in Calabasas, California, at the age of 87.
