= Walt Disney Productions short films (1928–1939) =

This is a list of short films created by Walt Disney Animation Studios between the years 1928 and 1939.

== 1920s ==
=== 1928 ===
Series	Title	Director	Release Date	DVD Release	Notes
Mickey Mouse	Steamboat Willie	Ub Iwerks; Walt Disney	November 18	"Mickey Mouse in Black and White" "The Adventures of Oswald the Lucky Rabbit" "Walt Disney's Vintage Mickey" "Celebrating Mickey" (Blu-ray) "Mickey & Minnie: 10 Classic Shorts" (Blu-ray)	First Mickey Mouse cartoon released, but the third to be produced. First Disney cartoon produced with synchronized sound. Distributed by Celebrity Productions. Public Domain.
Mickey Mouse	The Gallopin' Gaucho	Ub Iwerks	December 30	"Walt Disney Treasures: Mickey Mouse in Black and White"	Silent version previewed August 2, 1928. Parody of the Douglas Fairbanks film, The Gaucho, which was released November 21, 1927. Mickey wears shoes for the first time and halfway through the film, Mickey and Minnie’s eyes change from the Plane Crazy look to the look in Steamboat Willie.

=== 1929 ===
Series	Title	Director	Release Date	DVD Release	Notes
Mickey Mouse	The Barn Dance	Walt Disney; Ub Iwerks	March 14	"Mickey Mouse in Black and White, Volume Two"	First Disney short distributed by Columbia Pictures, excluding Plane Crazy.
Mickey Mouse	Plane Crazy	Walt Disney; Ub Iwerks	March 17	"Walt Disney Treasures: Mickey Mouse in Black and White" and "Walt Disney Treasures: The Adventures of Oswald the Lucky Rabbit"	First Mickey Mouse cartoon to be produced.
Mickey Mouse	The Opry House	Walt Disney; Ub Iwerks	March 28	"Mickey Mouse in Black and White, Volume Two"	First Mickey Mouse Episode to Feature Mickey's White Gloves
Mickey Mouse	When the Cat's Away	Walt Disney; Ub Iwerks	May 3*	"Mickey Mouse in Black and White, Volume Two"	* Date production was completed; release date unknown
Mickey Mouse	The Barnyard Battle	Walt Disney; Ub Iwerks	June 2*	"Mickey Mouse in Black and White, Volume Two"	* Date production was completed; release date unknown
Mickey Mouse	The Plowboy	Walt Disney; Ub Iwerks	June 28*	"Mickey Mouse in Black and White, Volume Two"	* Date production was completed; release date unknown First appearance of Horace Horsecollar
Mickey Mouse	The Karnival Kid	Walt Disney; Ub Iwerks	July 31*	"Mickey Mouse in Black and White" "Walt Disney's Vintage Mickey"	* Date production was completed; release date unknown * Mickey's first speaking appearance
Silly Symphony	The Skeleton Dance	Walt Disney; Ub Iwerks	August 22	"Silly Symphonies" "The Adventures of Oswald the Lucky Rabbit"	First Silly Symphonies short produced First Silly Symphonies short distributed by Columbia Pictures
Mickey Mouse	Mickey's Follies	Wilfred Jackson	August 28*	"Mickey Mouse in Black and White"	* Date production was completed; release date unknown / Mickey's first singing First film directed by Wilfred Jackson
Silly Symphony	El Terrible Toreador	Walt Disney	September 7*	"More Silly Symphonies"	* Date production was completed; release date unknown
Mickey Mouse	Mickey's Choo-Choo	Walt Disney	October 1*	"Mickey Mouse in Black and White, Volume Two"	* Date production was completed; release date unknown
Mickey Mouse	The Jazz Fool	Walt Disney	October 15*	"Mickey Mouse in Black and White, Volume Two"	* Date production was completed; release date unknown
Silly Symphony	Springtime	Ub Iwerks	October 24	"More Silly Symphonies"	
Silly Symphony	Hell's Bells	Ub Iwerks	October 30	"More Silly Symphonies"	
Mickey Mouse	Jungle Rhythm	Walt Disney	November 15*	"Mickey Mouse in Black and White, Volume Two"	* Date production was completed; release date unknown
Mickey Mouse	The Haunted House	Walt Disney	December 2*	"Mickey Mouse in Black and White, Volume Two"	* Date production was completed; release date unknown
Silly Symphony	The Merry Dwarfs	Walt Disney	December 16	"More Silly Symphonies"	
Mickey Mouse	Wild Waves	Burt Gillett	December 21*	"Mickey Mouse in Black and White, Volume Two"	

== 1930s ==
=== 1930 ===
Series	Title	Director	Release Date	DVD Release	Notes
Silly Symphony	Summer	Ub Iwerks	January 16	"More Silly Symphonies"	
Silly Symphony	Autumn	Ub Iwerks	February 15*	"More Silly Symphonies"	* Date production was completed; release date unknown
Silly Symphony	Cannibal Capers	Burt Gillett	March 13	"More Silly Symphonies"	
Mickey Mouse	Fiddling Around	Walt Disney	March 21	"Mickey Mouse in Black and White, Volume Two"	
Mickey Mouse	The Barnyard Concert	Walt Disney	April 5	"Mickey Mouse in Black and White, Volume Two"	
Silly Symphony	Night	Walt Disney	April 28	"More Silly Symphonies"	
Silly Symphony	Frolicking Fish	Burt Gillett	May 8	"More Silly Symphonies"	
Mickey Mouse	The Cactus Kid	Walt Disney	May 15	"Mickey Mouse in Black and White, Volume Two"	*First short where Marcellite Garner voices Minnie Mouse. * Final cartoon directed by Walt Disney until 1935.
Silly Symphony	Arctic Antics	Ub Iwerks; Burt Gillett	June 5	"More Silly Symphonies"	
Mickey Mouse	The Fire Fighters	Burt Gillett	June 25	"Mickey Mouse in Black and White"	
Mickey Mouse	The Shindig	Burt Gillett	July 29	"Mickey Mouse in Black and White"	
Silly Symphony	Midnight in a Toy Shop	Wilfred Jackson	August 16	"More Silly Symphonies"	
Mickey Mouse	The Chain Gang	Burt Gillett	September 5	"Mickey Mouse in Black and White" "The Complete Pluto"	
Silly Symphony	Monkey Melodies	Burt Gillett	September 26	"More Silly Symphonies"	
Mickey Mouse	The Gorilla Mystery	Burt Gillett	October 10	"Mickey Mouse in Black and White"	
Mickey Mouse	The Picnic	Burt Gillett	October 23	"Mickey Mouse in Black and White, Volume Two"	First appearance of Pluto (although prototype versions appeared in The Chain Gang)
Silly Symphony	Winter	Burt Gillett	October 30	"More Silly Symphonies" "Olaf's Frozen Adventure"	
Mickey Mouse	Pioneer Days	Burt Gillett	December 5	"Mickey Mouse in Black and White"	
Silly Symphony	Playful Pan	Burt Gillett	December 27	"More Silly Symphonies"	

=== 1931 ===
Series	Title	Director	Release Date	DVD Release	Notes
Mickey Mouse	The Birthday Party	Burt Gillett	January 2	"Mickey Mouse in Black and White" "Walt Disney's Vintage Mickey"	
Silly Symphonies	Birds of a Feather	Burt Gillett	February 10	"Silly Symphonies"	
Mickey Mouse	Traffic Troubles	Burt Gillett	March 7	"Mickey Mouse in Black and White, Volume Two"	
Mickey Mouse	The Castaway	Wilfred Jackson	April 6	"Mickey Mouse in Black and White, Volume Two" "Walt Disney's Vintage Mickey"	
Silly Symphonies	Mother Goose Melodies	Burt Gillett	April 16	"Silly Symphonies"	
Mickey Mouse	The Moose Hunt	Burt Gillett	April 30	"Mickey Mouse in Black and White, Volume Two"	
Silly Symphonies	The China Plate	Wilfred Jackson	May 25	"Silly Symphonies"	
Mickey Mouse	The Delivery Boy	Burt Gillett	June 13	"Mickey Mouse in Black and White, Volume Two"	
Silly Symphonies	The Busy Beavers	Burt Gillett	June 30	"Silly Symphonies"	
Mickey Mouse	Mickey Steps Out	Burt Gillett	July 7	"Mickey Mouse in Black and White"	
Silly Symphonies	The Cat's Out	Wilfred Jackson	July 28	"Walt Disney Treasures: More Silly Symphonies"	
Mickey Mouse	Blue Rhythm	Burt Gillett	August 18	"Mickey Mouse in Black and White"	
Silly Symphonies	Egyptian Melodies	Wilfred Jackson	August 27	"Silly Symphonies"	
Mickey Mouse	Fishin' Around	Burt Gillett	September 25	"Mickey Mouse in Black and White, Volume Two"	
Silly Symphonies	The Clock Store	Wilfred Jackson	September 30	"More Silly Symphonies"	
Mickey Mouse	The Barnyard Broadcast	Burt Gillett	October 10	"Mickey Mouse in Black and White, Volume Two"	
Silly Symphonies	The Spider and the Fly	Wilfred Jackson	October 23	"More Silly Symphonies"	
Mickey Mouse	The Beach Party	Burt Gillett	November 5	"Mickey Mouse in Black and White, Volume Two"	
Silly Symphonies	The Fox Hunt	Wilfred Jackson	November 18	"More Silly Symphonies"	
Mickey Mouse	Mickey Cuts Up	Burt Gillett	November 30	"Mickey Mouse in Black and White"	
Mickey Mouse	Mickey's Orphans	Burt Gillett	December 9	"Mickey Mouse in Black and White" "Walt Disney's Vintage Mickey"	
Silly Symphonies	The Ugly Duckling	Wilfred Jackson	December 17	"Silly Symphonies"	

=== 1932 ===
Series	Title	Director	Release Date	DVD Release	Notes
Silly Symphonies	The Bird Store	Wilfred Jackson	January 16	"More Silly Symphonies"	Last Silly Symphonies short distributed by Columbia Pictures.
Mickey Mouse	The Duck Hunt	Burt Gillett	January 28	"Mickey Mouse in Black and White"	
Mickey Mouse	The Grocery Boy	Wilfred Jackson	February 11	"Mickey Mouse in Black and White, Volume Two"	
Mickey Mouse	The Mad Dog	Burt Gillett	March 5	"Mickey Mouse in Black and White, Volume Two"	
Mickey Mouse	Barnyard Olympics	Wilfred Jackson	April 13	"Mickey Mouse in Black and White, Volume Two"	
Mickey Mouse	Mickey's Revue	Wilfred Jackson	May 12	"Mickey Mouse in Black and White" "Walt Disney's Vintage Mickey"	First appearance of Goofy, originally called Dippy Dawg
Mickey Mouse	Musical Farmer	Wilfred Jackson	June 9	"Mickey Mouse in Black and White, Volume Two"	
Silly Symphonies	The Bears and the Bees	Wilfred Jackson	July 9	"More Silly Symphonies"	First Disney short distributed by United Artists.
Mickey Mouse	Mickey in Arabia	Wilfred Jackson	July 18	"Mickey Mouse in Black and White, Volume Two"	Last Disney short distributed by Columbia Pictures.
Silly Symphonies	Just Dogs	Burt Gillett	July 30	"Silly Symphonies"	
Silly Symphonies	Flowers and Trees	Burt Gillett	July 30	"Silly Symphonies"	First Disney short produced in 3-Strip Technicolor
Mickey Mouse	Mickey's Nightmare	Burt Gillett	August 13	"Mickey Mouse in Black and White"	
Mickey Mouse	Trader Mickey	David Hand	August 20	"Mickey Mouse in Black and White, Volume Two"	
Silly Symphonies	King Neptune	Burt Gillett	September 10	"More Silly Symphonies"	In Technicolor
Mickey Mouse	The Whoopee Party	Wilfred Jackson	September 17	"Mickey Mouse in Black and White"	
Silly Symphonies	Bugs in Love	Burt Gillett	October 1	"More Silly Symphonies"	Last Silly Symphonies short produced in Black and White.
Mickey Mouse	Touchdown Mickey	Wilfred Jackson	October 15	"Mickey Mouse in Black and White"	
Mickey Mouse	The Klondike Kid	Wilfred Jackson	November 12	"Mickey Mouse in Black and White"	
Mickey Mouse	The Wayward Canary	Burt Gillett	November 12	"Mickey Mouse in Black and White, Volume Two"	
Silly Symphonies	Babes in the Woods	Burt Gillett & Ben Sharpsteen	November 19	"Silly Symphonies"	
Silly Symphonies	Santa's Workshop	Wilfred Jackson	December 10	"More Silly Symphonies"	
Mickey Mouse	Mickey's Good Deed	Burt Gillett	December 17	Jiminy Cricket's Christmas (VHS, LaserDisc) "Mickey Mouse in Black and White, Volume Two"; Holiday Celebration with Mickey & Pals	

=== 1933 ===
Series	Title	Director	Release Date	DVD Release	Notes
Mickey Mouse	Building a Building	David Hand	January 7	"Mickey Mouse in Black and White" "Walt Disney's Vintage Mickey"	
Mickey Mouse	The Mad Doctor	David Hand	January 20	"Mickey Mouse in Black and White"	
Mickey Mouse	Mickey's Pal Pluto	Burt Gillett	February 18	"Mickey Mouse in Black and White, Volume Two"	
Silly Symphonies	Birds in the Spring	David Hand	March 11	"More Silly Symphonies"	
Mickey Mouse	Mickey's Mellerdrammer	Wilfred Jackson	March 18	"Mickey Mouse in Black and White, Volume Two"	
Mickey Mouse	Ye Olden Days	Burt Gillett	April 8	Robin Hood "Mickey Mouse in Black and White"	
Silly Symphonies	Father Noah's Ark	Wilfred Jackson	April 8	"Silly Symphonies"	
Silly Symphonies	Three Little Pigs	Burt Gillett	May 27	"Silly Symphonies" "Timeless Tales, Volume One"	
Mickey Mouse	The Mail Pilot	David Hand	June 13	"Mickey Mouse in Black and White"	
Mickey Mouse	Mickey's Mechanical Man	Wilfred Jackson	June 17	"Mickey Mouse in Black and White, Volume Two"	
Mickey Mouse	Mickey's Gala Premier	Burt Gillett	July 1	"Mickey Mouse in Black and White"	
Silly Symphonies	Old King Cole	David Hand	July 29	"More Silly Symphonies"	
Silly Symphonies	Lullaby Land	Wilfred Jackson	August 19	"Silly Symphonies"	
Mickey Mouse	Puppy Love	Wilfred Jackson	September 2	"Mickey Mouse in Black and White"	
Silly Symphonies	The Pied Piper	Wilfred Jackson	September 16	"More Silly Symphonies" "Timeless Tales Volume One"	
Mickey Mouse	The Steeplechase	Burt Gillett	September 30	"Mickey Mouse in Black and White, Volume Two"	
Mickey Mouse	The Pet Store	Wilfred Jackson	October 28	"Mickey Mouse in Black and White"	Also released to home media on 16mm film as "Hired And Fired".
Mickey Mouse	Giantland	Burt Gillett	November 25	"Mickey Mouse in Black and White"	
Silly Symphonies	The Night Before Christmas	Wilfred Jackson	December 9	"More Silly Symphonies"	

=== 1934 ===
Series	Title	Director	Release Date	DVD Release	Notes
Silly Symphonies	The China Shop	Wilfred Jackson	January 13	"More Silly Symphonies"	
Mickey Mouse	Shanghaied	Burt Gillett	January 13	"Mickey Mouse in Black and White, Volume Two"	
Silly Symphonies	The Grasshopper and the Ants	Wilfred Jackson	February 10	"Silly Symphonies" "Timeless Tales, Volume One"	
Mickey Mouse	Camping Out	David Hand	February 17	"Mickey Mouse in Black and White"	
Mickey Mouse	Playful Pluto	Burt Gillett	March 3	"Mickey Mouse in Black and White, Volume Two"	
Silly Symphonies	Funny Little Bunnies	Wilfred Jackson	March 24	"Silly Symphonies"	
Silly Symphonies	The Big Bad Wolf	Burt Gillett	April 14	"Silly Symphonies"	
Mickey Mouse	Gulliver Mickey	Burt Gillett	May 19	"Mickey Mouse in Black and White"	
Silly Symphonies	The Wise Little Hen	Wilfred Jackson	June 9	"Silly Symphonies" "The Chronological Donald" "Timeless Tales, Volume Three"	First appearance of Donald Duck. Donald's first design form.
Mickey Mouse	Mickey's Steam Roller	David Hand	June 16	"Mickey Mouse in Black and White, Volume Two" "Walt Disney's Vintage Mickey"	
Silly Symphonies	The Flying Mouse	David Hand	July 14	"Silly Symphonies"; Dumbo	
Mickey Mouse	Orphan's Benefit	Burt Gillett	August 11	"Mickey Mouse in Black and White"	First appearance of Clara Cluck. First B&W appearance of Donald Duck. Final B&W appearances of Clarabelle Cow and Horace Horsecollar.
Silly Symphonies	Peculiar Penguins	Wilfred Jackson	September 1	"Silly Symphonies" "Holiday Celebration with Mickey & Pals"	
Mickey Mouse	Mickey Plays Papa	Burt Gillett	September 29	"Mickey Mouse in Black and White, Volume Two"	
Silly Symphonies	The Goddess of Spring	Wilfred Jackson	November 3	Snow White and the Seven Dwarfs "More Silly Symphonies" "It's a Small World of Fun, Volume 4"	
Mickey Mouse	The Dognapper	David Hand	November 17	"Mickey Mouse in Black and White"	
Mickey Mouse	Two-Gun Mickey	Ben Sharpsteen	December 15	"Mickey Mouse in Black and White"	Final B&W appearance of Minnie Mouse

=== 1935 ===
Series	Title	Director	Release Date	DVD Release	Notes
Silly Symphonies	The Tortoise and the Hare	Wilfred Jackson	January 5	"Silly Symphonies" "Timeless Tales, Volume One"	
Mickey Mouse	Mickey's Man Friday	David Hand	January 19	"Mickey Mouse in Black and White, Volume Two"	
Mickey Mouse	The Band Concert	Wilfred Jackson	February 23	"Mickey Mouse in Living Color"; Make Mine Music (Gold Classic Collection) "Celebrating Mickey" (Blu-ray) "Mickey & Friends: 10 Classic Shorts" (Blu-ray)	First Mickey cartoon in color. First color appearances of Goofy and Horace Horsecollar.
Mickey Mouse	Mickey's Service Station	Ben Sharpsteen	March 16	"Mickey Mouse in Black and White"	Final B&W appearances of Donald Duck, Goofy and Pete.
Silly Symphonies	The Golden Touch	Walt Disney	March 22	"Silly Symphonies" "Timeless Tales, Volume Three"	
Mickey Mouse	Mickey's Kangaroo	David Hand	April 13	"Mickey Mouse in Black and White, Volume Two"	Final Disney short in Black and White. Final B&W appearances of Mickey Mouse and Pluto.
Silly Symphonies	The Robber Kitten	David Hand	April 20	"Silly Symphonies"	
Silly Symphonies	Water Babies	Wilfred Jackson	May 11	"Silly Symphonies"	
Silly Symphonies	The Cookie Carnival	Ben Sharpsteen	May 25	"Silly Symphonies"	
Silly Symphonies	Who Killed Cock Robin?	David Hand	June 29	"Silly Symphonies"	
Mickey Mouse	Mickey's Garden	Wilfred Jackson	July 13	"Mickey Mouse in Living Color" "Classic Cartoon Favorites: Starring Mickey"	First color appearance of Pluto
Mickey Mouse	Mickey's Fire Brigade	Ben Sharpsteen	August 3	"Mickey Mouse in Living Color"	
Mickey Mouse	Pluto's Judgement Day	David Hand	August 31	"Mickey Mouse in Living Color"	
Mickey Mouse	On Ice	Ben Sharpsteen	September 28	"Mickey Mouse in Living Color" "The Complete Pluto" "Classic Cartoon Favorites: Starring Mickey" "Mickey & Minnie: 10 Classic Shorts" (Blu-ray)	
Silly Symphonies	Music Land	Wilfred Jackson	October 5	"Silly Symphonies" "Classic Cartoon Favorites: Extreme Music Fun"	
Silly Symphonies	Three Orphan Kittens	David Hand	October 26	"More Silly Symphonies"	
Silly Symphonies	Cock o' the Walk	Ben Sharpsteen	November 30	"More Silly Symphonies"	
Silly Symphonies	Broken Toys	Ben Sharpsteen	December 14	"More Silly Symphonies"	

=== 1936 ===
Series	Title	Director	Release Date	DVD Release	Notes
Mickey Mouse	Mickey's Polo Team	David Hand	January 4	"Mickey Mouse in Living Color" "Extreme Sports Fun"	
Mickey Mouse	Orphans' Picnic	Ben Sharpsteen	February 15	"Mickey Mouse in Living Color" "Starring Mickey"	
Mickey Mouse	Mickey's Grand Opera	Wilfred Jackson	March 7	"Mickey Mouse in Living Color" "Extreme Music Fun"	First color appearance of Clara Cluck.
Silly Symphonies	Elmer Elephant	Wilfred Jackson	March 28	"Silly Symphonies"; Dumbo	
Silly Symphonies	Three Little Wolves	David Hand	April 18	"Silly Symphonies"	
Mickey Mouse	Thru the Mirror	David Hand	May 30	"Mickey Mouse in Living Color"; Alice in Wonderland (Blu-Ray) "Celebrating Mickey" (Blu-ray) "Mickey & Minnie: 10 Classic Shorts" (Blu-ray)	
Mickey Mouse	Mickey's Rival	Wilfred Jackson	June 20	"Mickey Mouse in Living Color" "Mickey & Minnie's Sweetheart Stories" "Best Pals: Mickey and Minnie" "Celebrating Mickey" (Blu-ray)	
Mickey Mouse	Moving Day	Ben Sharpsteen	June 20	"Mickey Mouse in Living Color: "Starring Mickey"	First color appearance of Pete. First time Donald in modern design.
Mickey Mouse	Alpine Climbers	David Hand	July 25	"Mickey Mouse in Living Color" "It's a Small World of Fun, Volume 3"	
Mickey Mouse	Mickey's Circus	Ben Sharpsteen	August 1	"Mickey Mouse in Living Color" "Starring Mickey"	Mickey make a cameo appearance. First appearance of Salty the Seal.
Silly Symphonies	Toby Tortoise Returns	Wilfred Jackson	August 22	"Silly Symphonies"	
Mickey Mouse*	Donald and Pluto	Ben Sharpsteen	September 12	"The Chronological Donald"	* Mickey Mouse does not appear in this cartoon, despite it being released as part of the Mickey Mouse series.
Silly Symphonies	Three Blind Mouseketeers	David Hand & Jack Cutting	September 26	"More Silly Symphonies"; The Rescuers	
Mickey Mouse	Mickey's Elephant	David Hand	October 10	"Mickey Mouse in Living Color"	
Silly Symphonies	The Country Cousin	Wilfred Jackson	October 31	"Silly Symphonies" "Timeless Tales, Volume Two"	
Silly Symphonies	Mother Pluto	Wilfred Jackson	November 14	"Silly Symphonies"	
Silly Symphonies	More Kittens	David Hand & Wilfred Jackson	December 19	"More Silly Symphonies"	

=== 1937 ===
Series	Title	Director	Music	Release Date	DVD Release	Notes
Mickey Mouse	The Worm Turns	Ben Sharpsteen	Paul Smith	January 2	"Mickey Mouse in Living Color" "Bedknobs and Broomsticks" (30th Anniversary)	
Mickey Mouse*	Don Donald	Ben Sharpsteen	Paul Smith	January 9	"The Chronological Donald" "Starring Donald"	Reissued as Donald Duck series cartoon. Mickey does not appear in this short.
Mickey Mouse	Magician Mickey	David Hand	Albert Hay Malotte	February 6	"Mickey Mouse in Living Color" "'Walt Disney's Funny Factory with Mickey"	
Mickey Mouse	Moose Hunters	Ben Sharpsteen	Paul Smith	February 20	"Mickey Mouse in Living Color" "Walt Disney's Funny Factory with Mickey"	
Silly Symphonies	Woodland Café	Wilfred Jackson	Leigh Harline	March 13	"Silly Symphonies" "Extreme Music Fun"	
Mickey Mouse	Mickey's Amateurs	Pinto Colvig; Erdman Penner; Walt Pfeiffer	Oliver Wallace	April 17	"Mickey Mouse in Living Color"	
Silly Symphonies	Little Hiawatha	David Hand	Albert Hay Malotte	May 15	"More Silly Symphonies" "Timeless Tales, Volume Three"; Pocahontas	
Silly Symphonies	Modern Inventions	Jack King	Oliver Wallace	May 29	"The Chronological Donald"	Reissued as Donald Duck series cartoon. Mickey does not appear in this short. Last Disney short distributed by United Artists.
Mickey Mouse	Hawaiian Holiday	Ben Sharpsteen	Paul Smith	September 18	"Mickey Mouse in Living Color" "Starring Mickey" "Mickey & Minnie: 10 Classic Shorts" (Blu-ray)	First Disney short distributed by RKO Radio Pictures.
Mickey Mouse	Clock Cleaners	Ben Sharpsteen	Oliver Wallace; Paul Smith	October 15	"Mickey Mouse in Living Color" "The Great Mouse Detective" "Walt Disney's Funny Factory with Goofy"	
Silly Symphonies	The Old Mill	Wilfred Jackson	Leigh Harline	November 19	"Silly Symphonies"; Bambi	First cartoon to use the multiplane camera
Pluto	Pluto's Quin-puplets	Ben Sharpsteen	Oliver Wallace & Frank Churchill	November 26	"The Complete Pluto"	First cartoon produced in the Pluto series.
Donald Duck	Donald's Ostrich	Jack King	Oliver Wallace	December 10	"The Chronological Donald"	First cartoon produced in the Donald Duck cartoon series
Mickey Mouse	Lonesome Ghosts	Burt Gillett	Albert Hay Malotte	December 24	"The Adventures of Ichabod and Mr. Toad" "Mickey Mouse in Living Color" "Mickey & Friends: 10 Classic Shorts" (Blu-ray)	

=== 1938 ===
Series	Title	Director	Music	Release Date	DVD Release	Notes
Donald Duck	Self Control	Jack King	Oliver Wallace	January 21	"The Chronological Donald" "Walt Disney's Funny Factory with Donald"	
Mickey Mouse	Boat Builders	Ben Sharpsteen	Leigh Harline & Oliver Wallace	February 18	"Mickey Mouse in Living Color" "Celebrating Mickey" (Blu-ray) "Mickey & Friends: 10 Classic Shorts" (Blu-ray)	
Donald Duck	Donald's Better Self	Jack King	Oliver Wallace	March 18	"The Chronological Donald"	
Silly Symphonies	Moth and the Flame	Burt Gillett		April 1	"More Silly Symphonies"	
Donald Duck	Donald's Nephews	Jack King	Oliver Wallace	April 25	"The Chronological Donald" "Funny Factory with Hewey, Dewey & Louie"	First appearance of Huey, Dewey & Louie
Mickey Mouse	Mickey's Trailer	Ben Sharpsteen		May 6	"Mickey Mouse in Living Color" "Extreme Adventure Fun" "Celebrating Mickey" (Blu-ray) "Mickey & Friends: 10 Classic Shorts" (Blu-ray)	
Silly Symphonies	Wynken, Blynken, and Nod	Graham Heid		May 29	"Silly Symphonies"	
Donald & Goofy	Polar Trappers	Ben Sharpsteen		June 17	"The Chronological Donald" "It's a Small World of Fun, Volume 4"	First Donald and Goofy series.
Donald Duck	Good Scouts	Jack King		July 15	"The Chronological Donald" "Extreme Adventure Fun"	
Donald & Goofy	The Fox Hunt	Ben Sharpsteen		July 29	"The Chronological Donald"	A remake of the 1931 Silly Symphonies cartoon of the same name.
Mickey Mouse	The Whalers	Dick Huemer		August 19	"Mickey Mouse in Living Color"	
Mickey Mouse	Mickey's Parrot	Bill Roberts		September 9	"Mickey Mouse in Living Color" "Walt Disney's Funny Factory with Mickey"	
Mickey Mouse	Brave Little Tailor	Bill Roberts		September 23	The Sword in the Stone "Mickey Mouse in Living Color" "It's a Small World of Fun, Volume 2" "Celebrating Mickey" (Blu-ray) "Mickey & Minnie: 10 Classic Shorts" (Blu-ray)	
Silly Symphonies	Farmyard Symphony	Wilfred Jackson		October 21	"Silly Symphonies" "Extreme Music Fun"	
Donald Duck	Donald's Golf Game	Jack King		November 4	"The Chronological Donald" "Walt Disney's Funny Factory with Donald"	
—N/a	Ferdinand the Bull	Dick Rickard		November 18	"Disney Rarities: Celebrated Shorts: 1920s–1960s" "Timeless Tales, Volume Two"	
Silly Symphonies	Merbabies	Rudolf Ising		December 9	"More Silly Symphonies"	
Silly Symphonies	Mother Goose Goes Hollywood	Wilfred Jackson		December 30	"More Silly Symphonies"	Donald Duck makes a cameo appearance.

=== 1939 ===
Series	Title	Director	Release Date	DVD Release	Notes
Mickey Mouse*	The Standard Parade	Riley Thomson	January 4	"Mickey Mouse in Living Color, Volume Two"	*Commercial short produced for Standard Oil. Mickey and Minnie are seen in their new designs in the 1939 parade but they didn't appear in those designs in a cartoon short until the short called Mickey's Surprise Party. It was also a remake of Parade of Award Nominees (1932)
Donald Duck	Donald's Lucky Day	Jack King	January 13	"The Chronological Donald"	
Mickey Mouse	Society Dog Show	Bill Roberts	January 27	"Mickey Mouse in Living Color, Volume Two" "Mickey & Minnie's Sweetheart Stories"	Last cartoon with Mickey's older character design.
Mickey Mouse*	Mickey's Surprise Party	Hamilton Luske	February 18	"Mickey Mouse in Living Color"	*Commercial short produced for National Biscuit Company. Mickey Mouse's new eyes
Three Little Pigs*	The Practical Pig	Dick Rickard	February 24	"Silly Symphonies"	*Billed under this name instead of Silly Symphonies. Since this series never materialized, it is grouped with Silly Symphonies.
Goofy	Goofy and Wilbur	Dick Huemer	March 17	"The Complete Goofy" "Funny Factory with Goofy"	First cartoon produced in the Goofy series
Silly Symphonies	The Ugly Duckling	Jack Cutting	April 7	"Silly Symphonies" "Timeless Tales, Volume Two"	Final cartoon produced in the Silly Symphonies series. Educational version: Hans Christian Andersen's The Ugly Duckling (1980s)
Donald Duck	The Hockey Champ	Jack King	April 28	"The Chronological Donald" "Extreme Sports Fun"	
Donald Duck	Donald's Cousin Gus	Jack King	May 19	"The Chronological Donald" "Funny Factory with Donald"	
Donald Duck	Beach Picnic	Clyde Geronimi	June 14	"The Chronological Donald" "The Complete Pluto"	First Donald Duck series to feature Pluto
Donald Duck	Sea Scouts	Dick Lundy	June 30	"The Chronological Donald" "Funny Factory with Hewey, Dewey & Louie"	
Mickey Mouse	The Pointer	Clyde Geronimi	July 14	"Mickey Mouse in Living Color, Volume Two" "Funny Factory with Mickey"	
Donald Duck	Donald's Penguin	Jack King	August 11	"The Chronological Donald"	
Donald Duck	The Autograph Hound	Jack King	September 1	"The Chronological Donald"	
Donald Duck	Officer Duck	Clyde Geronimi	November 3	"The Chronological Donald"	First Donald Duck series to feature Pete. It was the first Pete cartoon not pairing with Mickey or Goofy.

=== Non-theatrical shorts ===
Series	Title	Director	Release Date	DVD Release	Notes
Mickey Mouse*	Minnie's Yoo Hoo	Walt Disney	1930		Promotional short, reuses animation from Mickey's Follies.
Mickey Mouse*	Parade of the Award Nominees	Walt Disney	November 18, 1932	"Mickey Mouse in Living Color"	Special production, Produced for the 5th Academy Awards; not released theatrically. First appearances of Mickey Mouse, Minnie Mouse, Clarabelle Cow and Pluto in color
