= David Hand (animator) =

American animator and film director (1900–1986)

- Born: David Dodd Hand; January 23, 1900; Plainfield, New Jersey, U.S.
- Died: October 11, 1986 (aged 86); San Luis Obispo, California, U.S.
- Occupation: Animator
- Years active: 1919-1950
- Employer(s): Walt Disney Productions (1930–1944); Gaumont-British Animation Ltd. (1946-1950)
- Children: 1

David Dodd Hand (January 23, 1900 – October 11, 1986) was an American animator and film director known for his work at Walt Disney Productions. He worked on numerous Disney shorts during the 1930s and eventually became supervising director on the animated features Snow White and the Seven Dwarfs and Bambi.

== Biography ==
Born in Plainfield, New Jersey, Hand began his animation career working on Max Fleischer's Out of the Inkwell cartoons throughout the 1920s. He joined the Disney studio in 1930 during a major drive by Disney to recruit from the best of animating talent.

Hand immediately made his mark as an animator. By 1932 he was regarded as one of the studio's top animators (despite some complaints that his work was "too mechanical") and had become a close friend of Walt Disney himself. Hand's organizational skills made Disney select him to be the studio's third director after Burt Gillett and Wilfred Jackson. He made his directorial debut for the company with the Mickey Mouse short Building a Building and went on to direct both Silly Symphony and Mickey Mouse shorts, including The Flying Mouse, Who Killed Cock Robin?, Three Orphan Kittens, and Thru the Mirror. By the late 1930s Hand's management skills had allowed him to ascend the hierarchy of the Studio to functioning as Disney's right-hand man. But as historian Michael Barrier notes "Hand's position was fundamentally untenable—he was second in command in an organization whose leader, younger than Hand himself, had no intention of ever stepping aside or sharing real power."

== Gaumont British Animation ==
After leaving Disney in 1944, Hand went to England, and, with the backing of J. Arthur Rank, who owned the Gaumont-British Corperation under The Rank Organisation, established Gaumont British Animation Ltd. at Moor Hall in July 1946 to produce animated theatrical adverts as well as two series, one called Animaland that used full animation, and the other called Musical Paintbox which used limited animation. After establishing the Moor Hall studio, Hand began directing and producing several theatrical animated advertisements. One of his first works as an advertising director at Gaumont-British is an animated advertisement for Rowntree's in 1946.

Due to Hand's experience from Disney, Gaumont-British Animation Ltd. had the most advanced animation ever seen in England up to that point, especially when compared to England's other animation studios at the time such as Halas and Batchelor and George Moreno's British Animated Productions Ltd. Hand had to bring in other American animators to help train the artists at the studio; one of those who came to assist was Ray Patterson from the Metro-Goldwyn-Mayer cartoon studio.

In Hand's later years in English advertising, Hand is well-known for his animated Ye Olde English Car-Tunes on Esso in 1948. With his Animaland and Musical Paintbox series gaining steam all across England, both of his series were unable to get distribution in the United States (although they did get distribution in Canada), and the studio closed in 1950, dooming plans to produce two animated features adapted from H. G. Wells' The First Men in the Moon and Lewis Carroll's The Hunting of the Snark. Hand moved to Colorado where he worked for the next 18 years at the Alexander Film Company, a maker of commercials and industrial films.

=== Animaland & Musical Paintbox ===
Beginning in late-September 1948, Hand's Animaland and Musical Paintbox series were released to theaters in the United Kingdom, with The Lion, the first Animaland short, being the first of the batch to be released on September 30 of that year. Later in June 1949, both of his series were released to theaters in Canada. Few in number, Hand's shorts were shown in theaters for only a year-and-a-half, ending their run in the United Kingdom in July 1950 and in Canada in October 1950.

Hand's first five Animaland shorts featured the animated lives of animal species, while the remaining four of his shorts featured the leading character Ginger Nutt, a little red squirrel who lives his life with his girl Hazel Nutt and faces trouble with characters Loopy Hare, Corny Crow, and Dusty Mole. Ginger Nutt's first short, It's A Lovely Day, was released to theaters in England on August 11, 1949 (and in Canada a short time later). Hand told The Manchester Guardian that his animation team in Cookham managed experimental work with the object of a British cartoon character capable of challenging American animation audiences. With his contributions to British animation, Hand was honored at Buckingham Palace in 1950.

In the early-1960s, Hand's cartoons began airing on British television for the first time in the United Kingdom. This lasted for decades on British television, continuing into the 2000s. In the Spring of 1998, most Animaland shorts made VHS distribution in the United States.

== Personal life ==
=== Death ===
Hand died from complications of a stroke in San Luis Obispo, California at age 86. Hand's son, David Hale Hand, has formed David Hand Productions which owns the rights to the 19 Gaumont animated shorts—nine Animaland cartoons and ten Musical Paintbox cartoons—and hopes to produce new films starring some of the characters in the shorts, e.g. Ginger Nutt. In 1994, Hand was posthumously inducted into the Disney Legends program.

== Filmography ==
=== Shorts ===
Title	Year	Credit	Series
Out of the Inkwell	1919	Animator	Out of the Inkwell
The Magic Lamp	1924	Animator	Dinky Doodle
Just Spooks	1925	Key animator	Dinky Doodle
Dinky Doodle in the Army	1926	Animator	Dinky Doodle
The Cat's Nine Lives	1926	Director	Unnatural History
The Tail of the Monkey	1926	Director	Unnatural History
Cannibal Capers	1930	Animator, designer	Silly Symphony
Frolicking Fish	1930	Animator	Silly Symphony
The Cactus Kid	1930	Animator	Mickey Mouse
The Fire Fighters	1930	Animator	Mickey Mouse
Arctic Antics	1930	Animator	Silly Symphony
Midnight in a Toy Shop	1930	Animator	Silly Symphony
Night	1930	Animator	Silly Symphony
Monkey Melodies	1930	Animator	Silly Symphony
The Chain Gang	1930	Animator	Mickey Mouse
The Gorilla Mystery	1930	Animator	Mickey Mouse
The Picnic	1930	Animator	Mickey Mouse
Winter	1930	Animator	Silly Symphony
Pioneer Days	1930	Animator	Mickey Mouse
Playful Pan	1930	Animator	Silly Symphony
The Birthday Party	1931	Animator	Mickey Mouse
Birds of a Feather	1931	Animator	Silly Symphony
Traffic Troubles	1931	Animator	Mickey Mouse
The Castaway	1931	Animator	Mickey Mouse
Mother Goose Melodies	1931	Animator	Silly Symphony
The Moose Hunt	1931	Animator	Mickey Mouse
The China Plate	1931	Animator	Silly Symphony
The Delivery Boy	1931	Animator	Mickey Mouse
The Cat's Out	1931	Animator	Silly Symphony
Egyptian Melodies	1931	Animator	Silly Symphony
The Barnyard Broadcast	1931	Animator	Mickey Mouse
Fishin' Around	1931	Animator	Mickey Mouse
Mickey Steps Out	1931	Animator	Mickey Mouse
The Fox Hunt	1931	Animator	Silly Symphony
The Beach Party	1931	Animator	Mickey Mouse
Mickey Cuts Up	1931	Animator	Mickey Mouse
Mickey's Orphans	1931	Animator	Mickey Mouse
The Ugly Duckling	1931	Animator	Silly Symphony
The Bird Store	1932	Animator	Silly Symphony
The Duck Hunt	1932	Animator	Mickey Mouse
The Grocery Boy	1932	Animator	Mickey Mouse
The Mad Dog	1932	Animator	Mickey Mouse
The Bears and Bees	1932	Animator	Silly Symphony
Mickey in Arabia	1932	Animator	Mickey Mouse
Flowers and Trees	1932	Animator	Silly Symphony
Just Dogs	1932	Animator	Silly Symphony
Mickey's Nightmare	1932	Animator	Mickey Mouse
Trader Mickey	1932	Director, animator	Mickey Mouse
King Neptune	1932	Animator	Silly Symphony
The Whoopee Party	1932	Animator	Mickey Mouse
Bugs in Love	1932	Animator	Silly Symphony
The Wayward Canary	1932	Animator	Mickey Mouse
Building a Building	1933	Director	Mickey Mouse
The Mad Doctor	1933	Director	Mickey Mouse
Birds in the Spring	1933	Director	Silly Symphony
The Mail Pilot	1933	Director	Mickey Mouse
Old King Cole	1933	Director	Silly Symphony
Camping Out	1934	Director	Mickey Mouse
Mickey's Steam Roller	1934	Director	Mickey Mouse
The Flying Mouse	1934	Director	Silly Symphony
The Dognapper	1934	Director	Mickey Mouse
Mickey's Man Friday	1935	Director	Mickey Mouse
Mickey's Kangaroo	1935	Director, writer	Mickey Mouse
The Robber Kitten	1935	Director	Silly Symphony
Who Killed Cock Robin?	1935	Director	Silly Symphony
Pluto's Judgement Day	1935	Director	Mickey Mouse
Three Orphan Kittens	1935	Director	Silly Symphony
Mickey's Polo Team	1936	Director	Mickey Mouse
Three Little Wolves	1936	Director	Silly Symphony
Thru the Mirror	1936	Director	Mickey Mouse
Alpine Climbers	1936	Director	Mickey Mouse
Three Blind Mouseketeers	1936	Director	Silly Symphony
Mickey's Elephant	1936	Director	Mickey Mouse
The Country Cousin	1936	Production supervisor	Silly Symphony
Mother Pluto	1936	Animator	Silly Symphony
More Kittens	1936	Director	Silly Symphony
Magician Mickey	1937	Director	Mickey Mouse
Little Hiawatha	1937	Director	Silly Symphony
Moth and the Flame	1938	Executive producer	Silly Symphony
Wynken, Blynken and Nod	1938	Executive producer	Silly Symphony
The Whalers	1938	Production supervisor	Mickey Mouse
Mickey's Parrot	1938	Executive producer	Mickey Mouse
Farmyard Symphony	1938	Executive producer	Silly Symphony
Ferdinand the Bull	1938	Executive producer	
Merbabies	1938	Production supervisor	Silly Symphony
How Walt Disney Cartoons Are Made	1939	Self	
The Practical Pig	1939	Executive producer	Silly Symphony
The Ugly Duckling	1939	Executive producer	Silly Symphony
The Hockey Champ	1939	Executive producer	Donald Duck
The Pointer	1939	Executive producer	Mickey Mouse
The Autograph Hound	1939	Executive producer	Donald Duck
Donald's Camera	1941	Production supervisor, organizational leader	Donald Duck
7 Wise Dwarfs	1941	Production supervisor	
All Together	1942	Supervisor	
The Grain That Built a Hemisphere	1943	Production supervisor	
The Thames	1948	Producer	Musical Paintbox
The Cuckoo	1948	Producer, executive producer	Animaland
The Lion (Felis Leo)	1948	Producer	Animaland
Wales	1948	Producer	Musical Paintbox
The House-Cat (Felis Vulgaris)	1948	Producer	Animaland
Somerset	1949	Producer	Musical Paintbox
A Fantasy on Ireland	1949	Producer	Musical Paintbox
The Ostrich	1949	Producer	Animaland
Yorkshire Ditty	1949	Producer	Musical Paintbox
The Australian Platypus	1949	Producer	Animaland
It's a Lovely Day	1949	Producer	Animaland
Ginger Nutt's Bee-Bother	1949	Producer	Animaland
Sketches of Scotland	1949	Producer	Musical Paintbox
Cornwall	1949	Producer	Musical Paintbox
Canterbury Road	1949	Producer	Musical Paintbox
Ginger Nutt's Christmas Circus	1949	Producer	Animaland
Devon Whey	1950	Producer	Musical Paintbox
A Fantasy on London Life	1950	Producer	Musical Paintbox
Ginger Nutt's Forest Dragon	1950	Producer	Animaland

=== Features ===
Title	Year	Credit
Servants’ Entrance	1934	Animator
Snow White and the Seven Dwarfs	1937	Director
Fantasia	1940	Director, associate producer
Bambi	1942	Director (credited as "David D. Hand")
Victory Through Air Power	1943	Animation supervisor
