= 1930 in animation =

Events in 1930 in animation.

== Events ==
=== February ===
- Ub Iwerks leaves the Walt Disney Company to establish his own animated studio, Iwerks Studio, which will last six years.

=== April ===
- April 19: Harman and Ising's Sinkin' in the Bathtub, the first Looney Tune cartoon and first Warner Bros. cartoon overall, is released. Bosko's girlfriend Honey also makes her debut.

=== August ===
- August 9: Betty Boop makes her debut in the cartoon Dizzy Dishes, produced by the Fleischer Studios.
- August 16: Ub Iwerks releases Fiddlesticks, which marks the debut of Flip the Frog.

=== September ===
- September 5: Burt Gillett's Mickey Mouse cartoon The Chain Gang is released, It marks the first appearance of Pluto.
- September 24: The Fleischer Studios release Swing You Sinners!.

=== October ===
- October 9: Burt Gillett's Mickey Mouse cartoon The Picnic is released, co-starring Minnie Mouse and her dog named Rover who will soon be named Pluto.

== Films released ==
- 2 January – The Cat's Meow (United States)
- 4 January – The Iron Man (United States)
- 12 January – Marriage Wows (United States)
- 16 January – Summer (United States)
- 30 January – Spook Easy (United States)
- 10 February – Radio Riot (United States)
- 15 February – Autumn (United States)
- 23 February – Caviar (United States)
- 27 February – Slow Beau (United States)
- 6 March – Just Mickey (United States)
- 9 March – Pretzels (United States)
- 13 March – Cannibal Capers (United States)
- 22 March – Hot Dog (United States)
- 23 March – Spanish Onions (United States)
- 27 March – Desert Sunk (United States)
- 5 April – The Barnyard Concert (United States)
- 6 April – Indian Pudding (United States)
- 19 April – Sinkin' in the Bathtub (United States)
- 20 April – Roman Punch (United States)
- 24 April – An Old Flame (United States)
- 4 May:
  - Hawaiian Pineapples (United States)
  - Hot Turkey (United States)
  - Fire Bugs (United States)
- 8 May – Frolicking Fish (United States)
- 10 May – The Cactus Kid (United States)
- 18 May – Swiss Cheese (United States)
- 23 May – Alaskan Knights (United States)
- 1 June – Codfish Balls (United States)
- 5 June – Arctic Antics (United States)
- 15 June – Hungarian Goulash (United States)
- 19 June – Jazz Rhythm (United States)
- 20 June – The Fire Fighters (United States)
- 3 July – Midnight in a Toy Shop (United States)
- 11 July – The Shindig (United States)
- 13 July – Bully Beef (United States)
- 14 July – Wise Flies (United States)
- 17 July – Honolulu Wiles (United States)
- 27 July – Kangaroo Steak (United States)
- 31 July – Night (United States)
- 9 August – Dizzy Dishes (United States)
- 10 August:
  - Monkey Meat (United States)
  - Monkey Melodies (United States)
- 14 August – Cinderella (United States)
- 16 August – Fiddlesticks (United States)
- 18 August – The Chain Gang (United States)
- 19 August – The Museum (United States)
- 24 August – Chop Suey (United States)
- 30 August – Barnacle Bill (United States)
- 1 September – The Fiddler (United States)
- 6 September – Flying Fists (United States)
- 7 September – French Fried (United States)
- 8 September – The Bandmaster (United States)
- 13 September – Congo Jazz (United States)
- 21 September – Dutch Treat (United States)
- 22 September – The Gorilla Mystery (United States)
- 24 September – Swing You Sinners! (United States)
- 27 September – The Village Barber (United States)
- October – Hold Anything (United States)
- 1 October – The Miner (United States)
- 5 October – Irish Stew (United States)
- 9 October:
  - The Apache Kid (United States)
  - The Picnic (United States)
- 12 October – Grand Uproar (United States)
- 18 October:
  - Little Orphan Willie (United States)
  - The Cuckoo Murder Case (United States)
- 19 October – Fried Chicken (United States)
- 30 October – Winter (United States)
- November – The Booze Hangs High (United States)
- 1 November –
  - Lambs Will Gamble (United States)
  - Sky Scraping (United States)
- 2 November – Jumping Beans (United States)
- 16 November – Scotch Highball (United States)
- 20 November – Pioneer Days (United States)
- 22 November – The Showman (United States)
- 23 November – Up to Mars (United States)
- 30 November – Salt Water Taffy (United States)
- 3 December – The Little Trail (United States)
- 6 December – Puddle Pranks (United States)
- 7 December – The Bug House (United States)
- 12 December – Accordion Joe (United States)
- 14 December – Golf Nuts (United States)
- 15 December – Box Car Blues (United States)
- 27 December:
  - Mysterious Mose (United States)
  - Playful Pan (United States)
- 28 December – Pigskin Capers (United States)

== Births ==
=== January ===
- January 3: Robert Loggia, American actor (voice of Bill Sykes in Oliver & Company, Grandpa Jehan in The Dog of Flanders, Lew Peterson in the Tom Goes to the Mayor episode "Saxman", himself in the Family Guy episodes "Brothers & Sisters" and "Call Girl"), (d. 2015).
- January 4: Sorrell Booke, American actor (voice of Boss Hogg in The Dukes, Mayor Fist in The Pound Puppies, Sheriff Rufus and TJ Buzby in Scooby-Doo Meets the Boo Brothers, Big Daddy Boo in Tiny Toon Adventures: How I Spent My Vacation, Pinky in Rock-a-Doodle, Boss Hoss in the Bonkers episode "Love Stuck", Sheriff Hebbs in The New Adventures of Captain Planet episode "Jail House Flock"), (d. 1994).
- January 6: Vic Tayback, American actor (voice of Carface in All Dogs Go to Heaven), (d. 1990).
- January 10: Roy E. Disney, American businessman (The Walt Disney Company, voiced himself in the Mickey Mouse Works episode "Mickey's Mix Up"), (d. 2009).
- January 11: Rod Taylor, American actor (voice of Pongo in 101 Dalmatians), (d. 2015).
- January 13: Frances Sternhagen, American actress (voice of Mrs. Bellamy in The Simpsons episode "The Frying Game"), (d. 2023).
- January 19: Tippi Hedren, American actress (voice of Mrs. McAllister in Invasion America, Madame Sofroni and Molly Mouse in the Adventures from the Book of Virtues episode "Generosity", Donna Day in The New Batman Adventures episode "Mean Seasons", Hippolyta in the Batman: The Brave and the Bold episode "Triumvirate of Terror!").
- January 20: Buzz Aldrin, American former astronaut, engineer and fighter pilot (portrayed himself in Fly Me to the Moon, voice of Commander Copernicus in the Miles from Tomorrowland episode "Connect & Protect", himself in The Simpsons episode "Deep Space Homer", the Recess episode "Space Cadet", and the Futurama episode "Cold Warriors").
- January 24: John Romita Sr., American comic book artist (story and art consultant on Spider-Man), (d. 2023).
- January 30: Gene Hackman, American actor (voice of General Mandible in Antz), (d. 2025).

=== February ===
- February 10: Robert Wagner, American actor (voice of Mr. Robinson in Everyone's Hero, himself in The Simpsons episode "Goo Goo Gai Pan" and the Futurama episode "Calculon 2.0").
- February 11: Flaminia Jandolo, Italian actress (dub voice of Lady in Lady and the Tramp, Merryweather in Sleeping Beauty and Perdita in One Hundred and One Dalmatians), (d. 2019).
- February 13: Frank Buxton, American actor (voice of the title character in Batfink), (d. 2018).
- February 22: Marni Nixon, American actress (sang the title song in Cinderella, the singing flowers in Alice in Wonderland and singing geese in Mary Poppins, singing voice of Grandmother Fa in Mulan), (d. 2016).
- February 27:
  - Lee Hartman, American novelist and animator (Walt Disney Company, Warner Bros. Cartoons), (d. 2012).
  - Rolly Crump, American animator and designer (Walt Disney Company), (d. 2023).

=== March ===
- March 2:
  - Don Kennedy, American radio and television personality and voice talent (voice of Tansit in Space Ghost Coast to Coast), (d. 2023).
  - Tom Wolfe, American author and journalist (voiced himself in The Simpsons episode "Moe'N'a Lisa"), (d. 2018).
- March 4: Ron Rodecker, American educator and artist (creator of Dragon Tales), (d. 2021).
- March 22: Stephen Sondheim, American composer and lyricist (voiced himself and composed the song "The Ballad of Buzz Cola" in The Simpsons episode "Yokel Chords"), (d. 2021).
- March 28: Albert S. Ruddy, American producer (Coonskin), (d. 2024).
- March 30:
  - John Astin, American actor (voice of Gomez Addams in The Addams Family and The New Scooby-Doo Movies episode "Wednesday is Missing", Bull Gator in Taz-Mania, Terry Duke Tetzloff in Duckman, Sydney in Aladdin, Dr. Putrid T. Gangreen in Attack of the Killer Tomatoes, Dave Bishop in As Told By Ginger, Santa Claus in Higglytown Heroes, Mr. Roborson in the Quack Pack episode "The Unusual Suspects", Uncle Dudley in the Justice League Action episode "Captain Bamboozle", The Mole in the Bonkers episode "Stressed to Kill").
  - Rolf Harris, Australian musician, actor and TV host (voice of Ralph Morris in Fetch the Vet, narrator in Olive the Ostrich), (d. 2023).

=== April ===
- April 2: Roddy Maude-Roxby, English retired actor and artist (voice of Edgar Balthazar in The Aristocats).
- April 5: Mary Costa, American retired opera singer and actress (voice of Princess Aurora in Sleeping Beauty).
- April 10:
  - Claude Bolling, French composer (Daisy Town, The Ballad of the Daltons), (d. 2020).
  - Lee Weaver, American actor (voice of Alpine in G.I. Joe: A Real American Hero, G.I. Joe: The Movie), (d. 2025).
- April 18: Clive Revill, New Zealand actor (voice of Kickback in The Transformers, King Nod in The Thief and the Cobbler, the Mighty Om in The Legend of Prince Valiant, Lyle Spanger, Baffeardin and Hermil Sioro in Freakazoid!, Galeo in Snorks, Potsworth in Midnight Patrol: Adventures in the Dream Zone, narrator in Mickey's Twice Upon a Christmas, King Claudius in the Pinky and the Brain episode "Melancholy Brain", Shedlock Jones in the DuckTales episode "Dr. Jekyll and Mr. Duck", Professor Grimace in the MoonDreamers segments of My Little Pony, first voice of Alfred Pennyworth in Batman: The Animated Series), (d. 2025).
- April 23:
  - Alan Oppenheimer, American retired actor (voice of Skeletor, Man-at-Arms, Cringer/Battle Cat and Mer-Man in He-Man and the Masters of the Universe, Rhinokey and Crocosaurus in The Wuzzles, Vanity Smurf in The Smurfs, Stampede in BraveStarr, Norman Burg in season 2 of The Big O, Alfred Pennyworth in Superman/Batman: Public Enemies, Mighty Mouse Oil Can Harry, Swifty and the Narrator in The New Adventures of Mighty Mouse and Heckle & Jeckle, Moss Man in Masters of the Universe: Revelation, Plato and Aldrin Klordane in the Chip 'n Dale: Rescue Rangers episode "Rescue Rangers to the Rescue").
  - Pino Zac, Italian illustrator, comics artist and animator, (d. 1985).

=== May ===
- May 6: Roy Naisbitt, British animator and layout artist (A Christmas Carol, Who Framed Roger Rabbit, Balto, Space Jam, The Last Belle), (d. 2021).
- May 9: Joan Sims, British actress (voice of Mrs. Cratchit in A Christmas Carol, the Witch in The Thief and the Cobbler), (d. 2001).
- May 10: Pat Summerall, American football player and sportscaster (voiced himself in The Simpsons episode "Sunday, Cruddy Sunday"), (d. 2013).
- May 17: Frank Price, American studio executive (Columbia Pictures, Universal Pictures), (d. 2025).

=== June ===
- June 4: Edward Kelsey, British actor (voice of Colonel K. and Baron Silas Greenback in Danger Mouse, Mr. Growbag in Wallace and Gromit: The Curse of the Were-Rabbit), (d. 2019).
- June 5: Vladimir Popov, Russian animator, film director and art director (Three from Prostokvashino), (d. 1987).
- June 19:
  - Gena Rowlands, American actress (voice of Grandmother in Persepolis), (d. 2024).
  - Gin, Spanish comics artist, animator and illustrator (Macian Studios), (d. 1996).
- June 23: Rupert van der Linden, Dutch comic artist, illustrator, painter and animated film director (De Goochelaar Ontgoocheld), (d. 2023).
- June 25: George Murdock, American actor (voice of Boss Biggis in the Batman: The Animated Series episode "The Forgotten"), (d. 2012).
- June 29: Robert Evans, American film producer, studio executive and actor (co-creator, producer and voice of the title character in Kid Notorious, himself in The Simpsons episode "Kill the Alligator and Run"), (d. 2019).

=== July ===
- July 5: Tommy Cook, American actor (voice of Kid Flash in The Superman/Aquaman Hour of Adventure, Mike Carter in Micro Ventures, Augie Anderson in The Funky Phantom, S. Melvin Farthinghill in Jeannie, Biff in Jabberjaw).
- July 12: Gordon Pinsent, Canadian actor, writer, director and singer (voice of the title character in Babar, Babar: The Movie, Babar: King of the Elephants and Babar and the Adventures of Badou, Captain Efraim Longstocking in Pippi Longstocking), (d. 2023).
- July 19: Rhoda Williams, American actress (voice of Drizella in Cinderella), (d. 2006).

=== August ===
- August 8: Len Maxwell, American actor (voice of Karate in Batfink, the judge in Hugo the Hippo, Nick Diamond in Celebrity Deathmatch), (d. 2008).
- August 11: Paul Soles, Canadian actor (voice of Hermey in Rudolph the Red-Nosed Reindeer, Spider-Man in Spider-Man), (d. 2021).
- August 25: Sean Connery, Scottish actor (voice of Draco in Dragonheart, Sir Billi in Sir Billi), (d. 2020).
- August 26:
  - French Tickner, American actor (English dub voice of Kagome Higurashi's grandfather in Inuyasha, Watari in Death Note), (d. 2021).
  - Willy Lateste, Belgian animator and comics artist (Belvision), (d. 1967).
- August 30: Warren Buffett, American business magnate and philanthropist (voiced himself in Secret Millionaires Club).
- August 31: Charles Kay, British actor (voice of Capulet in the Shakespeare: The Animated Tales episode "Romeo and Juliet"), (d. 2025).

=== September ===
- September 9: Mitzi McCall, American actress and comedian (voice of Mother Goose in Mother Goose and Grimm, Penny Pillar in The Pebbles and Bamm-Bamm Show, Ammonia Pine in Darkwing Duck, Auntie Marina in Snorks, Talula La Trane in Yo Yogi!, Glyptodont in Ice Age, Sylvia Jenkins in Free for All, Nanny in The Grim Adventures of Billy & Mandy episode "Scary Poppins", Miss Burns in the Gravedale High episode "Goodbye Gravedale", Una in the Talespin episode "Destiny Ride Again", Mistress Nina in then Duckman episode "Psyche", Mame Slaughter in the Captain Planet and the Planeteers episode "Five Ring Panda-Monium", Pearl in the Hey Arnold! episode "Arnold's Thanksgiving", Golda Meir in the Histeria! episode "Histeria Around the World: Part 2", Vulture in The Wild Thornberrys episode "Gift of Gab", Old Woman #1 in the American Dad! episode "1600 Candles", Librarian in the Regular Show episode "Go Viral"), (d. 2024).
- September 23:
  - Ray Charles, American singer, songwriter and pianist (voice of G-Clef in Blue's Big Musical Movie), (d. 2004).
  - Ivan Krasko, Russian actor (voice of the King in Little Longnose, Svyatogor in Alyosha Popovich and Tugarin Zmey, Russian dub voice of the Narrator in Hercules), (d. 2025).

=== October ===
- October 1:
  - Richard Harris, Irish actor and singer (portrayed Gulliver in Gulliver's Travels, voice of Opaz in Kaena: The Prophecy), (d. 2002).
  - R. O. Blechman, American animator (television commercials for Alka-Seltzer, Great Performances, The Soldier's Tale, Christmas Commercials for CBS).
- October 7: Austin Stoker, Trinidadian-American actor (voice of Jeff Allen in Return to the Planet of the Apes, Poacher #2 in The Wild Thornberrys episode "The Trouble with Darwin"), (d. 2022).
- October 17: Dai Tielang, Singaporean-Chinese animator and film director (Black Cat Detective, A Deer of Nine Colors, Little Tadpoles Looking for Mama), (d. 2019).
- October 24: Jack Angel, American voice actor (voice of Hawkman, Flash, and Samurai in Super Friends, King Zarkon in Voltron, Ramjet, Astrotrain, and various other characters in The Transformers, Liquidator in Darkwing Duck, Chunk in Toy Story 3, Comrade Chaos in El Tigre: The Adventures of Manny Rivera, Nick Fury in Spider-Man, Thor in Spider-Man, Technorg in the Ben 10 episode "Grudge Match", additional voices in DuckTales the Movie: Treasure of the Lost Lamp, The Rescuers Down Under, The Hunchback of Notre Dame, The Iron Giant, Monsters, Inc., Wallace & Gromit: The Curse of the Were-Rabbit, Roadside Romeo, The Lorax, and Despicable Me 2), (d. 2021).

=== November ===
- November 3: Larry Gelman, American actor (voice of Young Quist in the Freakazoid! episode "Lawn Gnomes: Chapter IV – Fun in the Sun"), (d. 2021).
- November 13: Michel Robin, French actor (voice of Champion in The Triplets of Belleville), (d. 2020).
- November 22: Jered Barclay, American actor (voice of Sinnertwin, Dr. Gregory Swofford, Wrist Timer and Cerebros in The Transformers, additional voices in Scooby-Doo and Scrappy-Doo, The Kwicky Koala Show, Trollkins, The Little Rascals, Richie Rich, The Dukes, Challenge of the GoBots, Pole Position, Foofur, The Smurfs and Paddington Bear), (d. 2022).

=== December ===
- December 11: Carl Angus Bell, Canadian-American animator (Beany and Cecil, MGM Animation/Visual Arts, Filmation, Ruby-Spears Enterprises, The Lord of the Rings, Fire and Ice, The Charlie Brown and Snoopy Show, Walt Disney Animation Studios), (d. 2022).
- December 12: Borivoj Dovniković, Croatian film director, animator and caricaturist (Veliki Miting), (d. 2022).
- December 17: Bob Guccione, American photographer and publisher (voiced himself in the Duckman episodes "Pig Amok" and "Love! Anger! Kvetching!"), (d. 2010).
- December 21: Phil Roman, American animator and director (Peanuts, Garfield, The Simpsons).

=== Specific date unknown ===
- Gary Mooney, Canadian-American animator (Walt Disney Company, Hubley Studios, Gene Deitch, Jay Ward Productions, animated sequence in Jurassic Park), (d. 2008).
- Marco Biassoni, Italian comic artist, illustrator and animator, (d. 2002).
- Margaret Nichols, American animator (Warner Bros. Animation, Walt Disney Animation Studios, UPA, Fleischer Studios, Snowball Animation, Patin, TV Spots, Creston, Eagle, Hanna-Barbera, Marvel Productions, Universal Studios and Graz Entertainment) and animation director (The Transformers, Inhumanoids, My Little Pony: The Movie, The Transformers: The Movie), (d. 2012).
- Peadar Lamb, Irish actor (voice of the title character in Jakers! The Adventures of Piggley Winks), (d. 2017).
- Cliff Voorhees, American comic book artist and background artist (Filmation, Hanna-Barbera, Marvel Productions, Film Roman, The Shnookums & Meat Funny Cartoon Show, Timon & Pumbaa, The Brave Little Toaster to the Rescue, The Angry Beavers, The Brave Little Toaster Goes to Mars, Mad Jack the Pirate, The Grim Adventures of Billy & Mandy, Evil Con Carne), (d. 2015).
- Werner Hierl, German comics artist (Rolf Kauka), and animator (Bavaria Film), (d. 2019).
