= The Delivery Boy (1931 film) =

1931 film by Burt Gillett

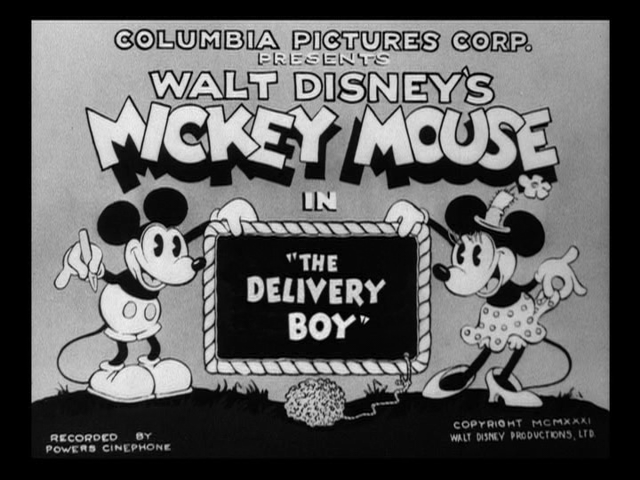
- Title card
- Directed by: Burt Gillett
- Produced by: Walt Disney
- Color process: Black and white
- Production company: Walt Disney Productions
- Distributed by: Columbia Pictures
- Release date: June 6, 1931
- Running time: 8 min
- Country: United States
- Language: English

The Delivery Boy is a 1931 American animated short film directed by Burt Gillett. It is the 29th film of the Mickey Mouse series.

== Plot ==
Mickey Mouse is driving a rickety donkey cart piled high with musical instruments, with his dog Pluto running alongside. They stop when they reach Minnie's house, and spy on her while she is washing and hanging up clothes. She is singing "In the Shade of the Old Apple Tree", and her enthusiasm is so infectious that even the laundry is dancing along. Mickey mischievously hides in a large pair of bloomers hanging on the line, teasing her by singing along and twanging her tail. Catching on to his trick, she drops him into the washtub, which breaks.

That puts a stop to Minnie's laundry chores, so the mice break into a jazzy Charleston dance number. Excited by the dance, Mickey punches a hornet's nest off a branch, and it lands on the donkey's tail. In his panic, the donkey smashes the cart to pieces, and the musical instruments land all over the barnyard.

Undaunted by this disaster, Minnie asks Mickey to play the piano for her, and they break into a spirited duet of "The Stars and Stripes Forever". The animals all play along, and everything is jolly until Pluto investigates a nearby road crew's work, and picks up a lit stick of dynamite. Thinking that he is fetching a stick, Pluto brings the dynamite back to Mickey and Minnie, and it blows the mice into the sky. Even that fails to dampen their spirits, and they conclude the number with a flourish.

== Voice cast ==
- Mickey Mouse: Walt Disney
- Minnie Mouse: Marcellite Garner
- Pluto, Donkey: William Ballsworth

== Reception ==
A contemporary review in Motion Picture Herald said: "One of the secrets of the immense popularity of Walt Disney's Mickey Mouse cartoon comedies is the fact that the audience is given a series of surprises. The Delivery Boy is no exception, as evidenced by the reaction of the audience at the Tobias Vanderbilt in New York. The unexpected sources discovered for music extraction brought a succession of chortling."

In Mickey's Movies: The Theatrical Films of Mickey Mouse, Gijs Grob writes: "This short is as joyous as it is boring. After three years of song-and-dance routines, one grows tired of it. Moreover, cartoons like Traffic Troubles and The Moose Hunt had proven that Mickey could do very well without them... Pluto's storyline, however brief, is the most interesting aspect of the cartoon, as it contains the germinal idea of a grand finale. Indeed, Pluto would cause havoc again in subsequent films, like Mickey Steps Out (1931), Mickey Cuts Up (1931), and The Grocery Boy (1932). In these films the song-and-dance routine would give way to well-built gag-filled finales, of which the one in The Delivery Boy is only an embryonic version."

== Home media ==
The short was released on December 7, 2004 on Walt Disney Treasures: Mickey Mouse in Black and White, Volume Two: 1929-1935, in the "From The Vault" bonus section.

== Television ==
The Delivery Boy was included in the TV show The Mickey Mouse Club (season 1, episode 31).

== See also ==
- Mickey Mouse (film series)
