= Busy beaver (disambiguation) =

Busy beaver is an English language idiom describing of a person who is particularly busy or industrious. Busy beaver and related terms may also refer to:

- The Busy Beaver game, in computational theory, a type of Turing machine
- The Busy Beavers, a 1931 Silly Symphonies animated film
- Busy Beaver, a True Value co-op member retail store chain

== See also ==
- Beaver § Behavior
