= King Neptune (film) =

1932 film by Burt Gillett

- Title card
- Directed by: Burt Gillett
- Produced by: Walt Disney
- Starring: Allan Watson; Marcellite Garner
- Music by: Leigh Harline
- Color process: Technicolor
- Production company: Walt Disney Productions
- Distributed by: United Artists
- Release date: September 10, 1932
- Running time: 7 min
- Country: United States
- Language: English

King Neptune is a 1932 American animated short film directed by Burt Gillett. It is the 31st film of the Silly Symphonies series and the second to be produced in Technicolor. While Flowers and Trees was originally intended as a black and white cartoon, King Neptune was meant to be in color from the start, and was able to take full advantage of this.

While the film is included in the 1980s VHS release of Silly Symphonies and the Walt Disney Treasures DVD, it was not selected for the Platinum Edition DVD collection, because of mermaid nudity and heavy drinking (as the film was targeting adult audiences).

== Plot ==
King Neptune is holding court at the bottom of the ocean, being entertained by his various sea creature subjects. His favorites are a gaggle of mermaids (all brunettes with the exception of a single strawberry-blonde) who appear hand-sized next to the larger-than-life king. Once dismissed from the king's presence, the mermaids surface to lounge on a rock and relax. They are spotted by a band of lecherous pirates who attempt to capture them using a lasso. The mermaids all escape apart from the strawberry blonde who is lassoed and pulled onto the ship of jeering pirates. The frightened young mermaid is then attacked by the cruel pirates, jumping on her and pulling her hair, though she does a good job of fending them off. Enraged that one of his most beloved subjects has been taken hostage and suffering, King Neptune launches an assault on the pirates and a fantastic naval battle ensues. The sea creatures work together to mimic such war machines as airplanes and bombs, submarine torpedoes, and other such modern equipment. During the attack one pirate drags the mermaid and puts her into a treasure chest to keep as a valuable. The pirates do a fair job of fending off their attackers, so Neptune rises to the surface and summons a storm while stirring up huge whirlpools with his trident. In the end, he jumps on top of the pirate ship, plunging it straight to the bottom of the ocean.

There is no trace of the pirates except a single chest that begins to jump around on its own. The ginger mermaid pops out of it, decked in gold and pearls. Her friends hurry to festoon themselves with jewelry and they perform another beautiful water ballet for King Neptune's pleasure.

== Voice cast ==
- King Neptune: Allan Watson
- Mermaids: Marcellite Garner

== Home media ==
The short was released on December 19, 2006, on Walt Disney Treasures: More Silly Symphonies, Volume Two in the "From the Vault" section, because of mermaid nudity and heavy drinking (due to the fact that the film was targeting adult audiences).

== Legacy ==
In 1933, Blue Ribbon Books published The Pop-Up Silly Symphonies, a pop-up book featuring full-color illustrations inspired by King Neptune and Babes in the Woods.

Disney used the character of King Neptune again, in the 1936 Mickey Mouse short Thru the Mirror, as well as in The Cold-Blooded Penguin, a segment in the 1945 film The Three Caballeros.
