= Scotty Finds a Home =

1935 film by Burt Gillett

- The cartoon's reissue title card
- Directed by: Burt Gillett
- Produced by: Amadee J. Van Beuren
- Music by: Winston Sharples
- Animation by: George Rufle; Carlo Vinci; Jack Zander (all uncredited)
- Color process: Cinecolor
- Production company: The Van Beuren Corporation
- Distributed by: RKO Radio Pictures; Walter O. Gutlohn, Inc. (reissue)
- Release date: August 23, 1935
- Running time: 7:46
- Country: United States
- Language: English

Scotty Finds a Home is a 1935 reel animated cartoon directed by Burt Gillett and produced for RKO Radio Pictures, which was later re-released by Walter O. Gutlohn Inc.

== Plot ==
The Cartoon

A young anthropomorphic kitten wants a pet. He happens to find a Scottish Terrier with no owner and takes him in. When the dog, now named "Scotty" tracks mud into the house, the kitten's grandmother says that her grandson cannot keep him. Scotty is thrown out of the house. After some time, a transient bulldog is walking by as the kitten's grandmother puts a pie in the window sill to cool. He barges into the house and terrorizes the family, demanding they feed him. Scotty rushes back to the house and saves the family; Grandma decides that they can keep him after all.
