= Just Dogs =

1932 film by Burt Gillett

- Directed by: Burt Gillett
- Produced by: Walt Disney
- Starring: Pinto Colvig
- Music by: Bert Lewis
- Color process: Black and white
- Production company: Walt Disney Productions
- Distributed by: United Artists
- Release date: July 30, 1932
- Running time: 7 min
- Country: United States
- Language: English

Just Dogs is a 1932 animated short film directed by Burt Gillett. It is the 29th film of the Silly Symphonies series and the first solo appearance of Pluto without Mickey Mouse.

== Plot ==
The film opens with a group of dogs in the dog pound, howling Vernon Dalhart's "The Prisoner's Song".

Pluto's cage-mate at the dog pound breaks out and lets all the other dogs out as well. In the park, the dog who helped Pluto earlier keeps following him too closely for Pluto's taste, until he digs up a huge bone and gives it to Pluto (who doesn't particularly want to share). Soon all of the other escaped dogs are chasing after the bone and snatch it from Pluto. Pluto's former cage-mate uses an army of fleas to get it back and then gives it back to Pluto. Pluto then decides to share the bone after all, and they enjoy it together as the cartoon fades out.

== Voice cast ==
- Pluto: Pinto Colvig
- Puppy: Unknown

== Home media ==
The short was released on December 4, 2001, on Walt Disney Treasures: Silly Symphonies - The Historic Musical Animated Classics.
