= Marco Biassoni =

- Born: 5 July 1930; Genoa, Italy
- Died: 12 August 2002 (aged 72); Milan, Italy
- Occupation: Italian cartoonist
- Spouse: Franca

Marco Biassoni (5 July 1930 – 12 August 2002) was an Italian cartoonist, animator, comics artist, humorist and filmmaker. He was also an illustrator who designed several Italian advertisements.

== Biography ==
Biassoni was born in Genoa. He became interested in graphics at a young age in Genoa before he founded the Studio Firma. He began to work in the advertising field in a company with Luzzati, Bernazzoli, Costantini, Piombio and Veruggio; the firm's clients included leading companies of the sixties, such as the Ilva-Italsider, Esso and Shell.

Among his best known campaigns was one featuring King Arthur for the Pavesi from 1964 to 1975 with the slogan: "Arriva Lancilotto, succede un 48."

He died in Milan in 2002.

In February 2003, an exhibition in Milan entitled "Homage to Biassoni" paid tribute to his long and prolific career. On the initiative of Carlo Squillante and Vittorio Pizzolato, since 2004 the main prize of the annual event Humour Gallarate, sponsored by dall'ANU, was titled "Grand Prix Marco Biassoni".

== Books ==
- Il piccolo elefante
- La streghetta dispettosa
- La streghetta al supermarket
- W Papà Natale!
- Cipcip nel bosco delle favole
- Re Rirò nel paese di Nonso
