= The Dognapper =

1934 Mickey Mouse cartoon

- Theatrical box art
- Directed by: David Hand
- Produced by: Walt Disney
- Starring: Clarence Nash; Pinto Colvig; Melvin J. Gibby
- Music by: Frank Churchill
- Animation by: Johnny Cannon; Clyde Geronimi; Hardie Gramatky; Dick Lundy; Bill Roberts; Bob Wickersham; Marvin Woodward
- Color process: Black-and-white
- Production company: Walt Disney Productions
- Distributed by: United Artists
- Release date: November 17, 1934; (USA)
- Running time: 8 minutes
- Country: United States
- Language: English

The Dognapper is a 1934 animated short film produced by Walt Disney Productions and released by United Artists. The cartoon stars Mickey Mouse and Donald Duck as police officers who chase Pegleg Pete after he dognaps Fifi, Minnie Mouse's pet Pekingese. The film was directed by David Hand and features the voices of Clarence Nash as Mickey and Donald, Pinto Colvig as Pete and Melvin J. Gibby as Fifi. It was the 70th Mickey Mouse short film to be released, and the eighth of that year. This was the first and only time that Mickey was voiced by Nash; Walt was in Europe at the time and was unavailable to record his lines for Mickey, thus, Nash took over.

== Plot ==
Mickey and Donald

The plot is introduced in newspaper headlines that Fifi, Minnie Mouse's pekingese, has been dognapped, along with a description of the suspect, Peg Leg Pete. A radio transmission detailing the suspect's get-away car is heard by police officer Mickey Mouse and his sidekick Donald Duck. The pair soon see Peg Leg Pete speed by in the car and they chase after him, Mickey driving a motorcycle and Donald riding in a sidecar. Despite Pete's evasive maneuvers he is unable to escape from Mickey and Donald, and they eventually follow him to his hideout in an abandoned sawmill.

Inside, Pete chains Fifi to the wall and grabs a submachine gun. Mickey and Donald follow Pete into the sawmill and hold him at gunpoint. The film is filled with various gags showing the two law men as bumbling and incompetent, yet at every turn they are able to stay ahead of Pete, but not capture him.

Finally, while Mickey and Donald are standing on a log, Pete activates a circular saw positioned to cut the log. Mickey and Donald run to stay ahead of the blade, but eventually the end of the log comes and the saw blade shakes loose and spins out of control. The blade proves a threat for all three of the characters, but eventually Pete gets his peg leg caught in the blade's arbor hole and brings it to a stop. Mickey and Donald restrain him with a corset, and they march Pete off to jail, accompanied by the instrumental "The Girl I Left Behind" with the now-free Fifi angrily barking at him.

== Releases ==
- 1934 - original theatrical release
- c. 1992 - Mickey's Mouse Tracks, episode #28 (TV)
- c. 1992 - Donald's Quack Attack, episode #54 (TV)
- 1998 - The Ink and Paint Club, episode #1.32: "Goin' to the Dogs" (TV)

== Home media ==
The short was released on December 2, 2002, on Walt Disney Treasures: Mickey Mouse in Black and White.

== See also ==
- Mickey Mouse (film series)
