= The Duck Hunt =

1932 film by Burt Gillett

- Title card
- Directed by: Burt Gillett
- Produced by: Walt Disney
- Starring: Walt Disney
- Color process: Black and white
- Production company: Walt Disney Productions
- Distributed by: Columbia Pictures
- Release date: January 21, 1932
- Running time: 7 min
- Country: United States
- Language: English

The Duck Hunt is a 1932 American animated short film directed by Burt Gillett. It is the 37th film of the Mickey Mouse series.

== Plot ==
Mickey and Pluto go to a pond to hunt for ducks. While Mickey hides behind some bullrushes in a boat with a shotgun, Pluto wears a duck decoy on his head and swims to the center of the pond. The ducks discover the truth after Mickey accidentally shoots a hole in the bottom of his boat.

== Reception ==
In a contemporary review, Motion Picture Herald said: "Amusingly conceived, expertly executed, this cartoon concerns itself with Mickey's adventures on a duck hunt."

== Home media ==
The short was released on December 2, 2002, on Walt Disney Treasures: Mickey Mouse in Black and White.

== See also ==
- Mickey Mouse (film series)
