= The Barnyard Broadcast =

1931 film by Burt Gillett

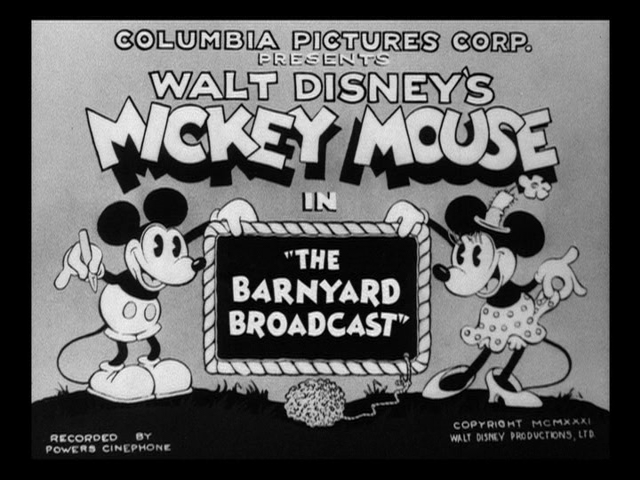
- Title card
- Directed by: Burt Gillett
- Produced by: Walt Disney
- Music by: Frank Churchill
- Color process: Black and white
- Production company: Walt Disney Productions
- Distributed by: Columbia Pictures
- Release date: September 1, 1931
- Running time: 8 min
- Country: United States
- Language: English

The Barnyard Broadcast is a 1931 American animated short film directed by Burt Gillett. It is the 33rd film of the Mickey Mouse film series.

== Plot ==
In a studio constructed in a barn, Mickey Mouse and his friends, Minnie Mouse, Horace Horsecollar and Clarabelle Cow, perform music for a radio broadcast. The listeners are all animals in the barnyard. The program goes smoothly, until a cat enters the barn and disrupts the music with his yowling. Mickey chases the cat out of the barn, but it returns through a hole in the door, followed by four unruly kittens. Mickey's attempts to get rid of the felines lead to the destruction of the instruments and the radio station.

== Voice cast ==
- Mickey Mouse: Walt Disney
- Kittens: Marcellite Garner
- Pluto/Cat: Lee Millar

== Reception ==
In a contemporary review, Motion Picture Herald said: "It is all delightful, nonsensical and amusing."

In Mickey's Movies: The Theatrical Films of Mickey Mouse, Gijs Grob writes: "The studio uses the cats to a great effect in a second attempt, after Mickey Steps Out, to build a finale from a string of gags. The film is not entirely successful in this, and only gains momentum when Mickey picks up the broom."

== Home media ==
The short was released on December 7, 2004 on Walt Disney Treasures: Mickey Mouse in Black and White, Volume Two: 1929-1935.

== Television ==
The Barnyard Broadcast was included in the TV show The Mickey Mouse Club (season 1, episode 76).

== See also ==
- Mickey Mouse (film series)
