= The Busy Beavers =

1931 film by Burt Gillett

- Title card
- Directed by: Burt Gillett
- Produced by: Walt Disney
- Music by: Frank Churchill
- Color process: Black and white
- Production company: Walt Disney Productions
- Distributed by: Columbia Pictures
- Release date: June 22, 1931
- Running time: 6 min
- Country: United States
- Language: English

The Busy Beavers is a 1931 American animated short film directed by Burt Gillett. It is the nineteenth film of the Silly Symphonies series.

== Plot ==
The short shows a community of beavers building their dam and soon shows one particular beaver trying to save it when it is threatened by a flash flood.

== Reception ==
Variety (July 14, 1931): "One of the Silly Symphonies and among the better of that group. At the Roxy, shown on the wide screen, the cartoon took on added attractiveness. Good anywhere. Runs with a sense of continuity which other cartoons fail to get despite the fact that only the quack-quack noises of the inked beavers and some interpolating sounds are heard by the customers. One good moment is when a cloudburst pummels one of the beavers Another is where a tree falls on one of them. However, he stays alive to be razzed by a plucked owl for a laugh finish."

The Film Daily (July 19, 1931): "Walt Disney made a 'knock-out' when he produced this Silly Symphony. Gags that are really new, animation that is smooth and clever and synchrony that never misses a beat. Disney has taken a theme which shows beavers building a dam as only cartooned beavers can do it. It finishes with a flood and one lone beaver attempting to save the dam from destruction. The reel is fast, funny and fine."

== Home media ==
The short was released on December 4, 2001, on Walt Disney Treasures: Silly Symphonies - The Historic Musical Animated Classics.
