= Flowers and Trees =

1932 film by Burt Gillett

- Title card
- Directed by: Burt Gillett
- Produced by: Walt Disney
- Starring: Ester Campbell; Pinto Colvig; Marion Darlington; Walt Disney
- Music by: Frank Churchill; Bert Lewis
- Color process: Technicolor
- Production company: Walt Disney Productions
- Distributed by: United Artists
- Release date: July 30, 1932
- Running time: 8 minutes
- Country: United States
- Language: English

Flowers and Trees is a 1932 American animated short film directed by Burt Gillett. It was released to theaters by United Artists on July 30, 1932. It is the 28th film of the Silly Symphonies series, the first commercially released film to be produced in the full-color three-strip Technicolor process as well as Disney's first color film. The film was a commercial and critical success, winning the first Academy Award for Best Cartoon Short Subject.

In 2021, the film was selected for preservation in the United States National Film Registry by the Library of Congress for being "culturally, historically, or aesthetically significant".

== Plot ==
During Spring, the flowers, mushrooms and trees do their calisthenics. Some trees play a tune, using vines for harp strings and a chorus of robins. A fight breaks out between a waspish-looking hollow elm and a younger, healthier poplar for the attention of a female holly oak. The poplar emerges victorious, but the elm retaliates by starting a fire. The plants and animals try to extinguish or evade the blaze. By poking holes in clouds and making it rain, the birds manage to put out the fire, although the elm perishes in the flames after getting caught up in them himself. The poplar then proposes to the holly oak, with a caterpillar serving as a ring, and they embrace as a 12-color rainbow forms behind them.

== Production ==
In May 1932, the first three-strip Technicolor camera was completed. Herbert Kalmus wanted to test it in the animation field, giving the company time to build enough cameras to offer the whole movie industry, but couldn't find any interested animators. Finally, Walt Disney agreed to try it as an experiment on Flowers and Trees, which was already in production in black-and-white, and ordered the cartoon redone in color. The color animation caused the production to run over budget, potentially ruining Disney financially, but the cartoon proved so popular that the profits made up for the budget overage.

== Legacy ==
As a result of the success of Flowers and Trees, all future Silly Symphonies cartoons were produced in three-strip Technicolor. The added novelty of color helped to boost the series' previously disappointing returns. Disney's other cartoon series, the Mickey Mouse shorts, were deemed successful enough not to need the extra boost of color, remaining in black-and-white until The Band Concert (1935).

Disney's exclusive contract with Technicolor, in effect until the end of 1935, forced other animation producers such as Ub Iwerks and Max Fleischer, some of whom had rejected Technicolor's exclusivity deal before Disney, to use Technicolor's inferior two-color process or a competing two-color system such as Cinecolor.

== Accolades ==
Flowers and Trees was the first animated film to win an Academy award at the fifth Academy Awards in 1932. It won best "Short Subjects, Cartoons", a category first introduced that year.

== Home media ==
The short was released on December 4, 2001 on Walt Disney Treasures: Silly Symphonies – The Historic Musical Animated Classics.

The short was included as a bonus on the Diamond Edition Blu-ray of Snow White and the Seven Dwarfs.

It made its streaming debut on Disney+ in 2021.
