= Mother Pluto =

- Directed by: Wilfred Jackson
- Story by: Earl Hurd
- Produced by: Walt Disney
- Music by: Leigh Harline
- Animation by: Isadore Klein; Johnny Cannon; Bill Roberts; Archie Robin; Norm Ferguson; Marvin Woodward; Clyde Geronimi; Nick George
- Color process: Technicolor
- Production company: Walt Disney Productions
- Distributed by: United Artists
- Release date: November 14, 1936 (United States)
- Running time: 8:35
- Country: United States
- Language: English

Mother Pluto is a Silly Symphonies animated short film released on November 14, 1936, directed by Wilfred Jackson. The cartoon features Pluto.

== Plot ==
The cartoon starts out in a farmyard with a hen in Pluto's doghouse. She notices a butterfly and goes after it, after hiding all of the eggs under the hay in Pluto's doghouse so that no one will steal them. Once she leaves, Pluto returns and gnaws a bone to his doghouse.

Pluto feels something underneath him and hears some noise. That is when a chick hatched and Pluto is very surprised. All of the other chicks hatch and follow Pluto outside. He tries to escape by going over the fence but the chicks go through the fence holes to follow him. The chicks play with Pluto until they get distracted by a grasshopper and Pluto takes advantage of this to get away from the chick. When he notices one of the chicks upset after swallowing the grasshopper, he comforts it and starts to enjoy being a mother.

The hen comes back into Pluto's doghouse only to notice that her chicks have hatched and are gone. After finding them with Pluto she and Pluto argue over the chicks. The hen goes to a rooster to help her get back her chicks. The rooster, and Pluto fight as the chicks go in his doghouse. Pluto tired after the battle returns to his doghouse. He reminisces about his time with the chicks until they appear. Pluto embraces them and they live happily ever after.

== Voices ==
- Pluto: Pinto Colvig
- The hen: Florence Gill

== Comic adaptations ==
The Silly Symphony Sunday comic strip ran a two-month-long adaptation of Mother Pluto from August 14 to October 16, 1938.

== Home media ==
The short was released on December 4, 2001, on Walt Disney Treasures: Silly Symphonies - The Historic Musical Animated Classics.
