= Burt Gillett =

American animator and film director (1891–1971)

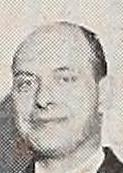
- Gillett c. 1935
- Born: Burton Fred Gillett; October 15, 1891; Elmira, New York, U.S.
- Died: December 28, 1971 (aged 80); Los Angeles, California, U.S.
- Education: Art Students League
- Occupations: Film director Animator; Writer
- Years active: 1918–1939
- Spouse(s): Louisa Carolyn Roberts (married 1911–1937); Ethel Falkenberg (married 1938–1942); Theckla Virginia Monberg (married 1943)
- Children: 2

Burton Fred Gillett (October 15, 1891 – December 28, 1971) was an American animator and film director. He is particularly noted for his direction of early Mickey Mouse and Silly Symphony cartoons for Walt Disney Productions.

After a couple jobs as a newspaper cartoonist, Gillett entered the animated cartoon industry during its early beginnings in New York. He animated popular characters like Mutt and Jeff, Koko the Clown, Krazy Kat, and Felix the Cat with a variety of pioneer cartoonists. At one point he briefly ran his own studio, Associated Animators. Gillett moved to Los Angeles was recruited as an animator at Disney, eventually being promoted to layout artist and after as one of Disney's first dedicated directors.

Gillett was offered a job at The Van Beuren Corporation to supervise the entire operation of its cartoon facility and upgrade its output to compete with Disney. This stint came with multiple production issues from Gillett's alleged arrogance and erratic direction methods, which brought on some of the earliest union activity in the animation industry until the studio closed in 1936. After another directorial stint at Disney, among a couple other short jobs, Gillett left the animation industry in 1939.

Gillett's most famous contributions to animation were for Disney, particularly on the 1932 short film Flowers and Trees and the 1933 short film Three Little Pigs. Both films won the Academy Award for Best Animated Short Film and were selected for inclusion in the National Film Registry.

== Early life ==
Born in Elmira, New York to Lewis Martin Gillett and Fra McClure, Gillett moved to Pennsylvania during his high school years, where his early artistic contributions included multiple issues in the amateur artists page of Judge magazine, one of which won him a prize in a drawing contest. Subsequently, Gillett traveled to New York to study at the Art Students League. The 1910 U.S. Census lists him as living in both Connellsville, Pennsylvania and New York City, working as a cashier for a lumber company.

== Career ==
=== Early career ===
Burt Gillett started his creative career contributing cartoons to The Connellsville News, then became the head of the Newburgh Daily News' art department in 1912. Gillett moved careers from newspaper cartooning to animation in 1918 when he was employed by the International Film Service, an early animation studio under the ownership of William Randolph Hearst and the supervision of Gregory La Cava. The studio had been formed in 1915 and first employed experienced animators Frank Moser and William Nolan. By July of the same year, the studio shut down, and Gillett relocated to The Mutt and Jeff Film Company, headed by Charles Bowers, with animation veteran Raoul Barré joining soon after, causing the studio to be renamed Barré-Bowers. Gillett had been hired among a group of notable co-workers like Jack King, Izzy Klein, Walter Lantz, Ben Sharpsteen and Vernon Stallings. He switched between these two jobs in brief periods, working at Hearst's reopened studio in 1919 and moving back to the old Barré-Bowers studio in 1921 after IFS shut its doors. Barré-Bowers studio was renamed Jefferson Film Corporation, supervised by Dick Friel, then Gillett briefly assumed directorial duties before the studio shuttered in 1922.

Gillett found himself at Max Fleischer's cartoon studio, animating on Out of the Inkwell cartoons with Koko the Clown. Subsequently, in 1925 Gillett formed his own studio, named Associated Animators, with veteran New York animators Ben Harrison, Manny Gould, and Dick Huemer serving as partners. The independent studio produced 26 cartoons, then shut down in mid-1926, leading Gillett to join Pat Sullivan's studio to work on Felix the Cat cartoons.

=== Walt Disney Studio ===
The Shindig, a 1930 Mickey Mouse cartoon directed by an uncredited Burt Gillett.

In 1929, Gillett joined the Walt Disney Studio where he started out primarily animating and soon after laying out scenes on Mickey Mouse cartoon shorts. At this point, Ub Iwerks was the only experienced animator on staff. Walt Disney visited New York City with the goal of hiring more experienced staff. The first notable animator hired this way was Ben Sharpsteen, a veteran of the Fleischer Studios. Disney visited Pat Sullivan's studio in a vain attempt to hire Otto Messmer, only to hire Gillett who was willing to move to California for the job. He started working for Disney in April 1929.

The move of the two New Yorkers to the studio coincided with a significant change in the way the staff functioned. Up to 1929, Walt Disney had been the de facto director of most of the studio's films, but now he was pulling back and establishing new directors. Gillett soon moved into the "music room" (the director's office). The division of responsibilities between them was still, however, informal and somewhat unclear. Disney did not hesitate to intervene and criticize Gillett in front of fellow staff members.

By the Summer of 1929, Iwerks and Gillett were the primary directors of the studio. Iwerks was tasked with directing the Silly Symphonies shorts, and Gillett directed the Mickey Mouse shorts as early as Mickey's Choo Choo. The Gillett-directed Mickey shorts The Chain Gang and The Picnic, released the following year, marked the earliest appearances of Pluto. The involvement of Disney himself in production details declined during this period. When Iwerks left the studio in 1930, Gillett assumed directorial duties of Silly Symphonies cartoons, starting with Cannibal Capers. Gillett was remembered by animators for his exuberant acting and enthusiasm when planning out shorts with staffers. He eventually directed the Academy Award winners Flowers and Trees and The Three Little Pigs, the former the earliest Disney short to employ Technicolor and the latter one of the earliest attempts at more defined character animation, and one most successful animated shorts of the 1930s.

Pastry Town Wedding, one of the first cartoons Gillett directed for the Rainbow Parade series

=== Van Beuren Studio ===
Due to the success of The Three Little Pigs, Gillett was recruited to run the Van Beuren Studios in 1934 to more effectively compete with Disney. At Van Beuren, Gillett hired a young Joseph Barbera for $25 a week for one of his earliest jobs in animation. He first started a series of live-action and animation hybrid shorts called Toddle Tales, which featured live children interacting with animated characters in wraparound segments for animated stories, of which three were released. Then, he directed the all-color series of Rainbow Parade animated shorts, mostly featuring one-off characters but sometimes including recurring characters like Molly Moo-Cow. Gillett shifted the studio production to producing only color cartoon shorts, an innovative step for early animation. The Rainbow Parade shorts imitated the Silly Symphonies, and immediately phased out the studio's prior established series and characters.

The failure of both attempts highlighted the weaknesses of his efforts to integrate the West Coast style of Disney with the East Coast style of Van Beuren. Most of these films diverted from the absurdist energy and imagination of earlier products of the studio, while also not fully reaching the Disney charm, graphic sophistication, and story structure they intended to compete with. In 1936, Gillett attempted to revive series focusing on the Toonerville Trolley and Felix the Cat. Despite the weaknesses of the whole series' direction, these films were more ambitiously produced, commercially successful, and acclaimed by audiences of the time.

Van Beuren Studios released its films through a distribution deal with RKO Pictures. In 1936, RKO signed an exclusive distribution deal with the Disney studio, consequently dumping Van Beuren. RKO pulled out of its deal with Van Beuren's animation division after the 1935-36 contract expired, and the studio closed after remaining cartoons were finished.

=== Later career ===
After a month-long vacation in England, Gillett returned to Disney on August 22, 1936, where he directed the Mickey Mouse cartoon Lonesome Ghosts. Gillett was fired in 1937, cited by some accounts for his behavior and for constantly running over budget. Two other cartoons were still in production under Gillett's supervision, the Silly Symphony Moth and the Flame and Mickey Mouse's Brave Little Tailor, but animator Dick Huemer replaced Gillett as director of the former while animator Bill Roberts took over directorial duties of the latter.

Gillett was offered a job at Metro-Goldwyn-Mayer's cartoon department and directed there in 1938, but left after a few months. Later that year, he then directed and wrote cartoons at Walter Lantz Productions, sometimes using the pseudonym "Gil Burton". Walter Lantz considered Gillett to be a perfectionist who worked by trial-and-error and constantly ran over budget. Gillett's shorts at Lantz rapidly ran significantly over budget and behind schedule, partially contributing to the studio's brief closure in 1940 (after distributor Universal cut the studio's weekly advance, facilitating financial unsustainable shortages).

By the time Gillett left Lantz, his extremely poor reputation in both New York and California's animator community led to him retiring from the animation industry; the 1940 U.S. Census listing him as unemployed and unable to work since the previous year. Gillett stayed in Los Angeles, working at a McDonnell's Drive-In restaurant in 1942, as a machine operator a year later, and as a maintenance worker at a candy company in 1950. Gillett died in 1971 in Los Angeles, California.

== Personal life ==
Gillett had three marriages. His first was at age 19, with Louisa Carolyn Roberts, a 15-year-old former maid of their family. They had one son, Frederic "Ted" Gillett, who was later a noted aircraft designer and ham-radio engineer W6HX in Southern California. Burt and Louisa divorced after claims of a strained relationship and that Gillett cheated on her with an employee of his, Ethel Falkenberg. Gillett and Ethel married and later had a child, Ronnie, in 1937. Ethel eventually divorced Gillett, and in 1943 he married Theckla Virginia Monberg. They separated by 1950, and Theckla died in 1953.

== Controversies ==
=== Abusive management and labor unrest at Van Beuren ===
According to multiple Van Beuren animators, Gillett supervised the studio with an attitude of arrogance and fostered a tumultuous atmosphere. Capable artists were constantly fired at random, and large scenes or whole films were scrapped entirely. Gillett invited Disney artists who were much younger than many of New York animators, some of whom started in the silent era, to lecture them on Disney animation techniques, which they took as condescension and harbored resentment towards. It didn't help that he fired about fifty people in a six-month period of staff cuts, citing as his reason their failure to meet his standards. Staff morale took a blow.

Gillett attempted to introduce the rigorous quality standards of Disney to the Van Beuren animators, but he did so while maintaining the same working conditions which had plagued the animators of the studio up to that point: lower budgets, and strict animation quotas filled with uncompensated extra work hours. Animators often saw their work rejected as substandard and had to work unpaid overtime to replace it. As a result of all this, a number of artists initiated contact with the Animated Motion Picture Workers Union (AMPWU), and discussed their plans to join the union, but Gillett had his informants among them.

On February 14, 1935, Gillett called a staff meeting to announce his knowledge of their union talk. He intimidated the artists into changing their plans, though their discontent remained. He later discovered that an inker named Sadie Bodin had encouraged female staff members to stand up to Gillett and refuse to do extra work, and fired her. Despite her protest that this violated the recently passed National Labor Relations Act, Gillett claimed that he fired her for her attitude rather than her stance in favor of unionizing. On April 17, 1937, Bodin and her husband began picketing outside the studio; for several days they called attention to Gillett firing employees because of their alleged union activity. Unfortunately, her former co-workers were too intimidated to stand by her side.

The AMPWU filed a formal complaint against Van Beuren with the National Labor Relations Board. In his testimony, Gillett claimed that he did not force employees to work for free, but that he had set up a system whereby employees would bank their hours and take the time as paid leave. The board ruled in favor of the studio management. In a subsequent staff meeting, Amadee J. Van Beuren stated his firm support for Gillett, who used his victory to fire other union agitators. Among them was Phil Klein, who was blacklisted by the New York based animation studios, requiring him to move to California to gain employment with the Disney studio.

=== Allegations of violent threats and misconduct ===
In his autobiography, Shamus Culhane claimed that while he was directing at Van Beuren, Gillett once threatened Culhane himself with a spindle after a dispute. Jack Kinney made an offhand statement in an interview that Gillett would undress female ink-and-paint workers walking across the Disney studio lot.

Burt Gillett's first wife, Louisa, testified in her 1937 divorce that he had habits of excessive drinking and made violent threats towards her during their marriage. In her testimonies, she claimed Gillett threatened to kill himself if Louisa wouldn't grant him a divorce to allow him to marry his second wife, Ethel Falkenberg. She also alleged that while cruising a vacation, Gillett threatened to throw her off the ship if she didn't divorce him.

Several golden age animators, among them Shamus Culhane, Jack Kinney and Isadore Klein, were of the opinion that Gillett was mentally unstable. In his autobiography, Culhane speculated Gillett suffered from bipolar disorder, noting he quickly swung from violent rages to excessive enthusiasm at random. In an interview, Kinney claimed he was a nervous, impulsive individual at Disney. Animator and writer Isadore Klein recalled Gillett's operation of Van Beuren's cartoon studio as highly erratic and uncertain. Culhane also alleged he was eventually institutionalized for several years, but some of Culhane's statements has been questioned by historians.

== Filmography (as director) ==
=== Disney ===
- Wild Waves (1929)
- Cannibal Capers (1930)
- The Fire Fighters (1930)
- Frolicking Fish (1930)
- Arctic Antics (1930)
- The Shindig (1930)
- The Chain Gang (1930)
- The Gorilla Mystery (1930)
- Monkey Melodies (1930)
- The Picnic (1930)
- Winter (1930)
- Pioneer Days (1930)
- Playful Pan (1930)
- The Birthday Party (1931)
- Birds of a Feather (1931)
- Traffic Troubles (1931)
- Mother Goose Melodies (1931)
- The Moose Hunt (1931)
- The Delivery Boy (1931)
- The Busy Beavers (1931)
- Mickey Steps Out (1931)
- Blue Rhythm (1931)
- Fishin' Around (1931)
- The Barnyard Broadcast (1931)
- The Beach Party (1931)
- Mickey Cuts Up (1931)
- Mickey's Orphans (1931)
- The Duck Hunt (1932)
- The Mad Dog (1932)
- Flowers and Trees (1932)
- Just Dogs (1932)
- Mickey's Nightmare (1932)
- Bugs in Love (1932)
- King Neptune (1932)
- The Wayward Canary (1932)
- Babes in the Woods (1932)
- Mickey's Good Deed (1932)
- Mickey's Pal Pluto (1933)
- Ye Olden Days (1933)
- Three Little Pigs (1933)
- Mickey's Gala Premier (1933)
- The Steeple Chase (1933)
- Giantland (1933)
- Shanghaied (1934)
- Playful Pluto (1934)
- The Big Bad Wolf (1934)
- Gulliver Mickey (1934)
- Orphan's Benefit (1934)
- Mickey Plays Papa (1934)
- Lonesome Ghosts (1937)
- Moth and the Flame (1938)

=== Van Beuren Studios ===
- Grandfather's Clock (1934)
- Pastry Town Wedding (1934)
- Along Came a Duck (1934)
- A Little Bird Told Me (1934)
- The Parrotville Fire Department (1934)
- The Sunshine Makers (1935)
- Parrotville Old Folks (1935)
- Japanese Lanterns (1935)
- Spinning Mice (1935)
- A Picnic Panic (1935)
- The Merry Kittens (1935)
- Parrotville Post-Office (1935)
- Rag Dog (1935)
- The Hunting Season (1935)
- Scotty Finds a Home (1935)
- Bird Scouts (1935)
- Molly Moo-Cow and the Butterflies (1935)
- Molly Moo-Cow and the Indians (1935)
- Molly Moo-Cow and Rip Van Winkle (1935)
- Toonerville Trolley (1936)
- Felix the Cat in "The Goose That Laid the Golden Egg (1936)
- Molly Moo-Cow and Robinson Crusoe (1936)
- Neptune Nonsense (1936)
- Bold King Cole (1936)
- Trolley Ahoy (1936)
- Toonerville Picnic (1936)

=== Metro-Goldwyn-Mayer cartoon studio ===
- The Winning Ticket (1938)

=== Walter Lantz ===
- The Birth of a Toothpick (1939)
- The Stubborn Mule (1939)
- Silly Superstition (1939)
- A Haunting We Will Go (1939)
- The Sleeping Princess (1939)
- Andy Panda Goes Fishing (1940)
- Adventures of Tom Thumb Jr. (1940)

== Preservation ==
Japanese Lanterns was preserved and restored by the UCLA Film & Television Archive from a 35mm nitrate print. Restoration funding was provided by ASIFA-Hollywood. The restoration had its world premiere at the 2024 UCLA Festival of Preservation.
