= Moth and the Flame =

- Directed by: Burt Gillett
- Story by: Walt Pfeiffer
- Produced by: Walt Disney
- Music by: Albert Hay Malotte
- Animation by: Ed Love
- Backgrounds by: Gustaf Tenggren
- Color process: Technicolor
- Production company: Walt Disney Productions
- Distributed by: RKO Radio Pictures
- Release date: April 1, 1938
- Running time: 8 minutes
- Country: United States
- Language: English

Moth and the Flame is a Silly Symphonies animated short film produced by Walt Disney and released on April 1, 1938.

== Plot ==
A group of moths invades a costume shop through a badly plugged hole in a window and makes quick work of the contents. A male moth ignores his lady to chow down on a top hat and she's soon seduced by a candle flame, which rapidly spreads. He notices her trapped in a spider web with the fire attacking and makes some attempts to save her, but pours benzene on the fire by mistake. The rest of the moths are summoned, and they fight the fire with water-filled bagpipes, an air drop with a water-filled funnel, etc., while the male moth works to free his lady from the spider web. The moths finally put the flame out with the help of an old top hat and it will never bother the lady moth again.

== Home media ==
The short was released on December 19, 2006, on Walt Disney Treasures: More Silly Symphonies, Volume Two. Prior to that, the featurette also appeared on the Walt Disney Cartoon Classics Limited Gold Edition: Silly Symphonies VHS in the 1980s.
