= Mickey Steps Out =

1931 film by Burt Gillett

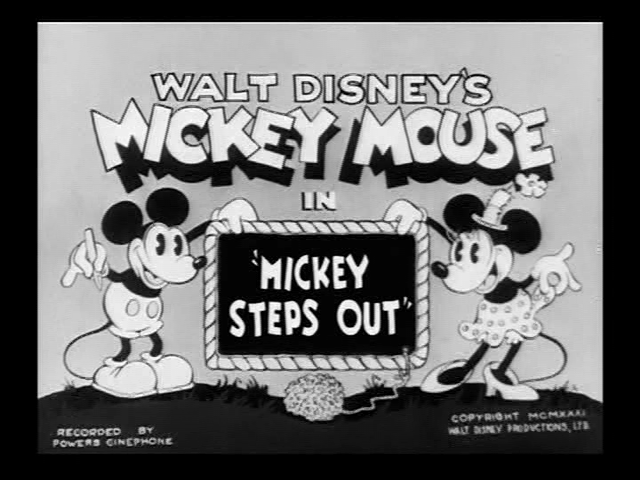
- Title card
- Directed by: Burt Gillett
- Produced by: Walt Disney
- Music by: Frank Churchill
- Color process: Black and white
- Production company: Walt Disney Productions
- Distributed by: Columbia Pictures
- Release date: September 18, 1931
- Running time: 8 min
- Country: United States
- Language: English

Mickey Steps Out is a 1931 American animated short film directed by Burt Gillett. It is the 30th film in the Mickey Mouse series and the fourth cartoon to star Pluto.

== Plot ==
At home, Mickey Mouse gets ready for a date with Minnie, shaving and singing "I'm a Ding Dong Daddy from Dumas". Doffing a straw hat and carrying a cane, Mickey sets out on his date when his dog Pluto comes out of nowhere, pounces on him, barks and taps excitedly and licks him affectionately, but Mickey, not in the mood for any of his pet's antics, sends the dog back, tying him to his doghouse. As Mickey dances his way to Minnie's, Pluto comes along anyway, dragging his doghouse behind him and gives him the same affection he gave when he made his appearance, much to his master’s annoyance. Before he could give his dog a stern talking to, Mickey soon listens to Minnie's singing, taking his mind off of Pluto's over affection and begins focusing on the singing.

Approaching Minnie's house, Mickey hears her playing the piano. He pokes his head in the window, whistling along with Minnie's pet canary. Pluto begins chasing a cat as Mickey enters the house. Minnie plays "Sweet Georgia Brown" as Mickey dances, showing off by balancing a broom on his nose and spinning plates.

The song-and-dance is interrupted when Pluto chases the cat into the house, knocking Mickey over. The chase causes chaos in the house, wrecking the piano and knocking over Mickey, who's hit by a falling cuckoo clock. The cat jumps into the stove with Pluto close behind, and the animals' battle sends soot flying everywhere. With all four characters now in blackface, Mickey cries, "Minnie!"; Minnie cries, "Mickey!"; Pluto cries, "Mammy!"; and the cat shouts "Whoopee!"

== Voice cast ==
- Mickey Mouse: Walt Disney
- Minnie Mouse: Marion Darlington
- Whistling canary: Esther Campbell

== Production ==
This short is one of the only two Mickey Mouse cartoons in which Pluto speaks; the other is The Moose Hunt (1931).

The cartoon ends with Mickey, Minnie and Pluto as "blackface stereotypes". The blackface sequence has sometimes been cut on television airings.

== Reception ==
In a contemporary review, Motion Picture Herald said: "Mickey, the animated mouse, goes jazz with a vengeance while Minnie supplies the music and inspiration. Gained a number of laughs in New York, and good synchronization does its part." Motion Picture Reviews said that the cartoon contains "moderately entertaining misadventures", although "a few vulgarities might be dispensed with".

In Mickey's Movies: The Theatrical Films of Mickey Mouse, Gijs Grob writes of the ending: "This two-minute sequence is the first well-constructed finale in animation history."

Animated Short Films: A Critical Index to Theatrical Cartoons called it a "mediocre Mickey cartoon". However, Michael Barrier in Hollywood Cartoons: American Animation in Its Golden Age praised the improvement in the studio's animation: "Mickey moves with none of the monotonous rhythmic twitching so typical of the early Disney sound cartoons; instead, Mickey's movements have some of the variety, within the rhythmic framework of the music, that a human dancer's would have."

== Home media ==
The short was released on December 3, 2002 on Walt Disney Treasures: Mickey Mouse in Black and White.

== Television ==
The Delivery Boy was included in the TV show The Mickey Mouse Club (season 1, episode 68).

== See also ==
- Mickey Mouse (film series)
