= Egyptian Melodies =

1931 film by Wilfred Jackson

- Directed by: Wilfred Jackson
- Produced by: Walt Disney
- Music by: Frank Churchill
- Color process: Black and white
- Production company: Walt Disney Productions
- Distributed by: Columbia Pictures
- Release date: August 21, 1931
- Running time: 6 min
- Country: United States
- Language: English

Egyptian Melodies is a 1931 American animated short film directed by Wilfred Jackson. It is the 21st film of the Silly Symphonies series.

== Summary ==
When a spider goes down into an Egyptian tomb, it instantly regrets going there when the mummies and hieroglyphs come to life.

== Plot ==
The short film starts near the entrance of the Sphinx in Ancient Egypt, a spider plays its web like a harp. It notices the door shaking and jumps off its web, the door slowly opens up revealing pitch blackness. The spider creeps up to the open door and motions us quietly "Shh!" to follow it. Beyond the open door is a long, dark hallway with a few staircases leading downward. The spider gets scared by a falling piece of brick and flees, he then tumbles down a staircase. It hears a ticking sound and goes to see what the source of the sound is. Now in a large Egyptian tomb, the spider giggles at the camera and points at a sandtimer but gets scared when the bell atop it starts ringing. It flees and tries hiding in a sarcophagus but flees away at the sight of a mummy that nearly falls on top of it. Four other sarcophaguses open up, revealing four more mummies. The spider screams "Mummies!" and hides inside a vase, the mummies begin dancing around the tomb. When the dance ends, the mummies return to their sarcophaguses. Popping its head out of the vase, the spider looks around and then spots the hieroglyphics on the tomb's wall, these come to life and start dancing. The hieroglyphics begin hosting a chariot race but then start a massive fight, the spider looks in horror at the crazed hieroglyphics and screams petrified. The poor spider cowers in fear and runs out of the tomb, up the staircases, down the stone halls and out of the door, running for its dear life over the desert dunes.

== Reception ==
Variety (February 23, 1932): "One of Walt Disney's Silly Symphonies and just fair filler matter. Nice penmanship, as usual in this series, is outstanding. Starts out as though it's going to be original, with an Egyptian background, and one of the sphinxes suddenly opens a door. Spider crawls in and down corridors, with then the usual ghost and mummy stuff."

== Home media ==
The short was released on December 4, 2001, on Walt Disney Treasures: Silly Symphonies - The Historic Musical Animated Classics.
