= Babes in the Woods =

1932 film by Burt Gillett

- Title card
- Directed by: Burt Gillett
- Produced by: Walt Disney
- Color process: Technicolor
- Production company: Walt Disney Productions
- Distributed by: United Artists
- Release date: November 19, 1932
- Running time: 8 min
- Country: United States
- Language: English

Babes in the Woods is a 1932 American animated short film directed by Burt Gillett. It is the 32nd film of the Silly Symphonies series.

It is a re-working of the British folk tale Babes in the Wood, with some material incorporated from Brothers Grimm's Hansel and Gretel, the Russian folk tale The Boy and the Witch, and the addition of a village of friendly elves (a feature not traditionally present in either tale) and a happier ending.

It is the last Disney short to produce with Cinephone synchronized sound system.

== Plot ==
The film opens with birds flying around the "Witch Rock", as a singing voice starts to recount the legend relating to it as told in the storybooks. Hansel and Gretel wander the woods and stumble upon a village of dwarfs. They are welcomed in until a witch comes and takes them away on her broom to her candy house. The witch watches them eat the house and invites them inside the house, which is revealed to be filled with cages and handcuffs, with ugly animals that are all in fact transformed children ("Lizards, rats, spiders and bats. That's what I make of all little brats!").

The witch turns Hansel into a spider with a potion and chains him to a post. She then takes a spoonful of a brew from a cauldron on the fireplace and throws it onto a noisy cat, turning it into stone. She takes Gretel and tries to turn her into a rat, but an arrow from outside smashes the potion. The witch then locks Gretel beneath the floor and goes out to see that the dwarfs have come to the rescue of Hansel and Gretel.

While the witch is fighting the dwarfs, Hansel frees his sister and in the process discovers the antidote to the earlier potion, which they then use to return the other children to normal. Finally, the witch falls from her broom and into her cauldron from the sky and turns into stone, turning into the Witch Rock. The children and dwarfs celebrate their victory over the witch, and thus the story of the Witch Rock is passed down to legend.

== Home media ==
The short was released on December 4, 2001, on Walt Disney Treasures: Silly Symphonies – The Historic Musical Animated Classics.

This short was released also in bonus on the Diamond Edition blu-ray of 2009 of Snow White and the Seven Dwarfs.

== See also ==
- List of films about witchcraft
