= Mother Goose Melodies =

1931 film by Burt Gillett

- Directed by: Burt Gillett
- Produced by: Walt Disney
- Color process: Black and white
- Production company: Walt Disney Productions
- Distributed by: Columbia Pictures
- Release date: April 17, 1931
- Running time: 8 min
- Country: United States
- Language: English

Mother Goose Melodies is a 1931 American animated short film directed by Burt Gillett. It is the seventeenth film in the Silly Symphonies series. Two years later it was semi-remade in Technicolor as Old King Cole.

== Plot ==
Old King Cole summons various Mother Goose characters for his entertainment, including the Three Blind Mice as his "fiddlers three", Miss Muffet, Jack and Jill (who meet Simple Simon atop the hill), Humpty Dumpty (whom Mother Goose's goose knocks off his wall), Jack Horner (his Christmas pie also containing the four and twenty blackbirds), Bo Peep (Little Boy Blue brings the sheep home, one of which falls in mud to become Baa Baa Black Sheep) and the Cat, Cow and Little Dog.

== Voice cast ==
- Allan Watson: Old King Cole
- Walt Disney: Jack Horner
- Whistling: Marion Darlington

== Reception ==
Motion Picture Herald (May 9, 1931): "Great: Walt Disney has done a most unusual piece of work in this Silly Symphony number. There is indicated a great step forward technically, in animation and synchronization, in addition to excellent subject material, clever animated ideas, and rapidity of action. There is almost the illusion of real life in some of the figures, so fine is the animation. Many well known Mother Goose rhymes are included with the stories neatly running together. Old King Cole is featured, and Little Jack Horner is present as well. The youngsters will devour this and ask for more, and the elderly children will enjoy it hugely. By all means do not miss it. It is great."

The Film Daily (September 13, 1931): "Great: Walt Disney and his assistants have turned out a synchronized cartoon comedy that will be hard to beat. It has all the Mother Goose rhymes worked into the story and the transposition from one to the other is accomplished by turning the pages of a huge story book. Drawings on the pages come to life and perform real laugh-making antics. Gags are new and plentiful. This one will make audiences laugh plenty."

== Home media ==
The short was released on December 4, 2001, on Walt Disney Treasures: Silly Symphonies - The Historic Musical Animated Classics.
