= The China Plate =

1931 film by Wilfred Jackson

- Title card
- Directed by: Wilfred Jackson
- Produced by: Walt Disney
- Music by: Frank Churchill
- Color process: Black and white
- Production company: Walt Disney Productions
- Distributed by: Columbia Pictures
- Release date: May 25, 1931
- Running time: 7 minutes
- Country: United States
- Language: English

The China Plate is a 1931 American animated short film directed by Wilfred Jackson. It is the eighteenth film in the Silly Symphonies series.

== Plot ==
The short is based on the Willow pattern legend, with some major differences, including a dragon. There is an oriental scene, the Willow pattern on a china plate, that comes to life, telling the story of two young lovers who are disturbed. First, they have to deal with an angry and overweight Emperor who is the girl's father. He chases after them because the boy disturbed his rest and disapproves of him near his daughter. The two children are then chased by a fire-breathing dragon that eats the emperor (he thought the dragon's open mouth was a cave entrance).

== Reception ==
The Film Daily (June 14, 1931): "Entertainment for both juvenile and adult audiences is to be found in this Walt Disney Silly Symphony. Novelty rather than humor is the keynote. It's real and different entertainment all the way".

Variety (June 30, 1931): "The biggest arena of 'em all the Roxy Theatre has gone cartoon for the last couple of shows. Pen and ink reels aren't being restricted to the supper hour, but are flashing at the deluxe performances right after the newsreel. So far the house has been giving the Disney drawings the break. This is another from that source and good enough to fit any big house layout. This one carries the familiar musical synchronization while unfolding a couple of amusing twists... Short is notable for the absence of dialog. Just sound effects, and it's better this way".

== Home media ==
The short was released on December 4, 2001, on Walt Disney Treasures: Silly Symphonies - The Historic Musical Animated Classics.
