= Mickey Cuts Up =

1931 film by Burt Gillett

- Title card
- Directed by: Burt Gillett
- Produced by: Walt Disney
- Starring: Walt Disney
- Color process: Black and white
- Production company: Walt Disney Productions
- Distributed by: Columbia Pictures
- Release date: November 25, 1931
- Running time: 7 min
- Country: United States
- Language: English

Mickey Cuts Up is a 1931 American animated short film directed by Burt Gillett. It is the 35th film of the Mickey Mouse series.

== Plot ==
Mickey mows his yard with a reel mower pulled by Pluto, while next door Minnie waters her garden. Mickey tricks Minnie by pretending to be a bird in a bird house, but instead he gets attacked by a cat. While Mickey and Minnie are playing a harmonica duet, Pluto chases after the cat, but the mower is still tied on to him and it cuts up everything in its path.

== Voice cast ==
- Pluto: Lee Millar

== Reception ==
In a contemporary review, Motion Picture Herald said: "Another clever and amusing Walt Disney animated cartoon. Mickey and his dog are mowing the lawn and Minnie watering the flowers when things begin to happen."

== Home media ==
The short was released on December 2, 2002, on Walt Disney Treasures: Mickey Mouse in Black and White.

== See also ==
- Mickey Mouse (film series)
