= Bert Lewis =

American baseball player (1895-1950)

- Pitcher
- Born: October 3, 1895; Tonawanda, New York
- Died: March 24, 1950 (aged 54); Tonawanda, New York
- Batted: Right Threw: Right

MLB debut
- April 19, 1924, for the Philadelphia Phillies

Last MLB appearance
- September 20, 1924, for the Philadelphia Phillies

MLB statistics
- Win–loss record: 0–0
- Earned run average: 6.00
- Strikeouts: 3
- Stats at Baseball Reference

Teams
- Philadelphia Phillies (1924)

William Burton Lewis (October 3, 1895 – March 24, 1950) was a pitcher in Major League Baseball. He appeared in twelve games for the 1924 Philadelphia Phillies. In addition to playing with the Philadelphia Phillies in 1924, Lewis also competed with the original Buffalo Bisons American Basketball League team in its inaugural season of existence.
