= Monkey Melodies =

1930 film by Burt Gillett

- Title card
- Directed by: Burt Gillett
- Produced by: Walt Disney
- Music by: Bert Lewis
- Color process: Black and white
- Production company: Walt Disney Productions
- Distributed by: Columbia Pictures
- Release date: August 10, 1930
- Running time: 7 min
- Country: United States
- Language: English

Monkey Melodies is a 1930 American animated short film directed by Burt Gillett. It is the thirteenth film in the Silly Symphony series.

The film

== Plot ==
All the animals in the jungle are singing and dancing, mostly monkeys and other primates with birds and crocodiles having their own dance numbers. The plot centers around two of the monkeys who are in love and express their romance in the form of dance and rhythm throughout the film.

== Reception ==
Variety (October 15, 1930): "Just a wee bit better than the usual run of cartoon shorts. Given good musical synchronization, which draws a few laughs along with antics of the cartoon characters. Here it is two monks who are the sweethearts, with an alligator the villain. Usual stuff, cooked up in a different manner."

Motion Picture News (October 18, 1930): "Foolishly Clever: Everything else, it seems, has had its cartoon day. Now it's the monkeys. Walt Disney has fairly outdone himself in the assortment of ridiculous postures and gyrations through which he puts his pen-and-ink characters. Cartoons are diverting when they get foolishly clever. Which is exactly what the producer has done with Monkey Melodies."

The Film Daily (October 26, 1930): "A little love episode in the jungle, with two simians as the sweethearts and an alligator as the menacing villain, provides the framework for this cartoon comedy. Entirely well done both in action and in synchronized score."

== Home media ==
The short was released on December 19, 2006, on Walt Disney Treasures: More Silly Symphonies, Volume Two.
