= Pluto (Disney) =

Disney character

- Mickey Mouse character
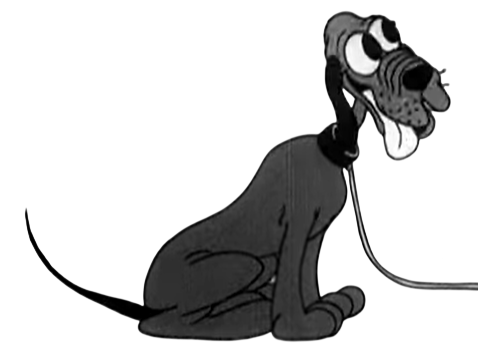
- Pluto, at this point named Rover, in The Picnic.
- First appearance: The Chain Gang (September 5, 1930; 96 years ago) (unnamed); The Picnic (October 9, 1930; 96 years ago) (as Rover); The Moose Hunt (April 30, 1931; 95 years ago) (as Pluto)
- Created by: Walt Disney; Norm Ferguson
- Designed by: Norm Ferguson
- Voiced by: Lee Millar (1930–1940); Pinto Colvig (1932–1937, 1954–1957); Jimmy MacDonald (1941–1953); Teddy Barr (1941); Paul Frees (1959); Bill Farmer (1990–present)
- Developed by: Norm Ferguson; Clyde Geronimi; Charles August Nichols

In-universe information
- Aliases: Rover; Pluto the Pup
- Species: Dog
- Gender: Male
- Family: Mickey Mouse (owner); K.B. (brother)
- Significant others: Dinah the Dachshund; Fifi the Peke; Tiki ("Pluto's Penthouse Sweet")
- Children: Pluto Junior (son); Four unnamed children

Pluto is an American cartoon character created by Walt Disney and Norm Ferguson. He is a yellow-orange color, medium-sized, short-haired dog with black ears. Unlike other Disney characters, Pluto is not anthropomorphic beyond some characteristics such as facial expressions. He is Mickey Mouse's pet. Officially a mixed-breed dog, he made his debut as a bloodhound in the Mickey Mouse cartoon The Chain Gang. Together with Mickey Mouse, Minnie Mouse, Donald Duck, Daisy Duck, and Goofy, Pluto is one of the "Sensational Six", the main protagonists of the franchise.

Pluto appeared in 24 Mickey Mouse films before receiving his own series in 1937. All together Pluto appeared in 89 short films between 1930 and 1953. Several of these were nominated for an Academy Award, including The Pointer (1939), Squatter's Rights (1946), Pluto's Blue Note (1947), and Mickey and the Seal (1948). One film starring him, Lend a Paw (1941), won the award in 1942. Like all of Mickey Mouse's co-stars, Pluto appears extensively in comics, first in 1931. He returned to theatrical animation in 1990 with The Prince and the Pauper and is in several direct-to-video films. Pluto is in countless television series, video games, and all other Mickey Mouse & Friends media.

In 1998, Disney's copyright on Pluto, set to expire at the end of 2005, was extended by the passage of the Sonny Bono Copyright Term Extension Act. Disney, along with other rights holders, lobbied for passage of the act to preserve their copyrights on characters such as Pluto for 20 additional years. On January 1, 2026, the earliest appearances of Pluto entered the public domain, however (like almost all popular Disney characters) Pluto's name and image remains trademarked by The Walt Disney Company—and unlike copyrights—trademarks do not expire unless they ceased to be used.

== Origin ==
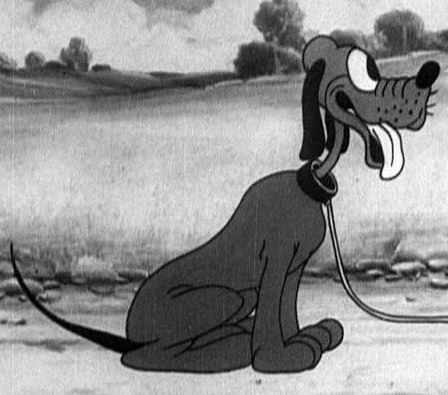
Pluto, as "Rover", in The Picnic (1930), his first appearance as a friendly pet.

The character of Pluto originated with animator Norm Ferguson, who came to Walt Disney Productions in 1929. Ferguson is credited with introducing the animation principle of "follow through and overlapping action": where different parts of the body move at different times and speeds compared to the main action. Ferguson first introduced this technique in the Silly Symphony short Frolicking Fish (released May 8, 1930): where he animated a trio of dancing fish, and offset the movement of their fins, having them "drag" along with the main body's movement. This gave the characters a more flowing and natural movement than in most other animation of that time. Walt Disney was so impressed with Ferguson's work on Frolicking Fish, that he ordered all of his animators study the scene.

Shortly after completing his work on Frolicking Fish, Disney assigned Ferguson to work on the Mickey Mouse cartoon The Chain Gang (released on September 5, 1930); where Mickey is portrayed as a prisoner who escapes from jail, and is pursued by two nameless bloodhounds. Ferguson was tasked with animating a scene where Mickey runs towards the camera and is followed by the two bloodhounds, who sniff Mickey's trail, look up, snort, and bark at the camera. According to Frank Thomas and Ollie Johnston, when describing this scene to Ferguson, Disney reminisced about different dogs he grew up with as a child, and acted out their mannerisms (much to the staff's amusement), which Ferguson would then translate into his animation.

When animating the scene, Ferguson applied his principle of "follow through and overlapping action" to the jowls of the dogs, which gave them surprisingly lifelike movement for the time. Animation historian Michael Barrier wrote about the scene:

The dogs were among the very first Disney characters whose design broke with the prevailing formula that put white masks on virtually interchangeable black bodies ... their jowls hang loosely, their nostrils wrinkle and flair, their movements echo those of real dogs. When the dogs appear, there is a sense, however faint and fleeting, of solid flesh on a screen otherwise occupied by phantoms.

Upon reviewing the scene, Disney was so impressed by Ferguson's animation on the dogs, he decided to develop one of them into a recurring character. Ferguson's dog character next appeared in The Picnic (released on October 23 of that same year); however, he was portrayed as Minnie's dog, and was named "Rover". In his third appearance, The Moose Hunt (released on May 3, 1931), he appeared as Mickey's pet, and was finally given the name "Pluto". Disney animator Ben Sharpsteen claimed they changed the name to Pluto because: "We thought the name [Rover] was too common, so we had to look for something else. ... We changed it to Pluto the Pup ... but I don't honestly remember why." Some Disney animators reportedly believed that Disney chose the name "Pluto" to capitalize on the then-newly-named ninth planet of Pluto. However, animation historian John Canemaker states that Disney chose the name simply because he once had a dog named Pluto.

Other animators handled the character, but Ferguson became the Pluto specialist at Disney. Over the next few years, Ferguson continued to develop and refine the character, ultimately crystalizing with Playful Pluto (1934), in which Ferguson animated a scene where Pluto gets a piece of flypaper stuck to his rear end. The sequence was storyboarded by Webb Smith, and Ferguson padded the scene and added extra bits of comic business. The scene was considered a major landmark in the development of character animation. Frank Thomas and Ollie Johnston described the scene as:

... a milestone in personality animation. From the time he [Pluto] accidently sits on a sheet of the sticky flypaper, Pluto's problems seem to become ever worse as he tries to extricate himself. Through it all, his reaction to his predicament and his thoughts of what to try next are shared with the audience. It was the first time a character seemed to be thinking on screen, and, though it lasted only 65 seconds, it opened [up] the way for animation of real characters with real problems.

Following the circulation of Art Babbitt's Character Analysis of the Goof around the Disney studio, Ferguson wrote a four-page character bible on Pluto that was published on January 4, 1936, and detailed Pluto's body construction, facial expressions, mannerisms and personality.

== Appearances ==
Pluto first and most often appears in the Mickey Mouse series of cartoons. His solo star debut is in two Silly Symphony shorts, Just Dogs (1932) and Mother Pluto (1936). In 1937, Pluto appeared in Pluto's Quin-Puplets which was the first installment of his own film series, then headlined Pluto the Pup.

His first comics appearance was in the Mickey Mouse comic strip on July 1, 1931, two months after the release of The Moose Hunt. In 1938, Pluto headlined in the Silly Symphony Sunday comic strip, in an adaptation of his Silly Symphony short, Mother Pluto. Pluto was later featured in several sequences of the Silly Symphony strip in 1939 and 1940.

In the various Disney theme park resorts worldwide, Pluto is an interactive character just like many of his film co-stars.
