= The Moose Hunt =

1931 film by Burt Gillett

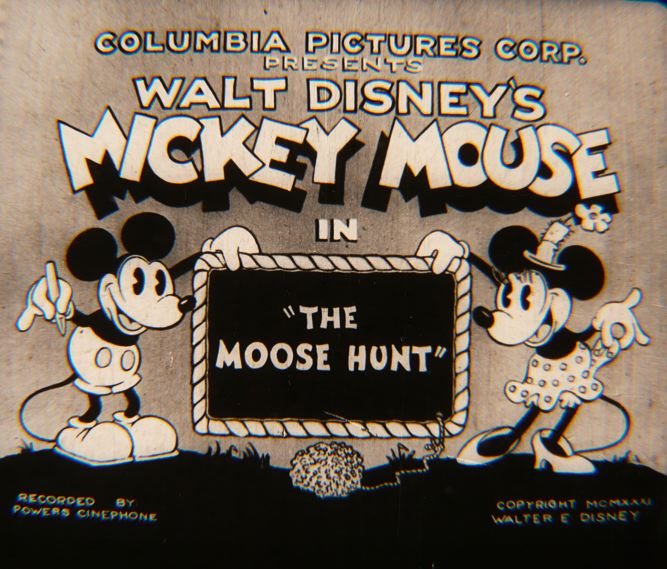
- Title card
- Directed by: Burt Gillett
- Produced by: Walt Disney
- Starring: Walt Disney; Pinto Colvig
- Production company: Walt Disney Productions
- Distributed by: Columbia Pictures
- Release date: April 30, 1931
- Running time: 7:22
- Country: United States
- Language: English

The Moose Hunt is a 1931 American animated short film directed by Burt Gillett. It was released on April 30, 1931. It is the 28th film of the Mickey Mouse film series, the second cartoon to feature Pluto and the first to feature his modern design.

Having been published in 1931, the cartoon is set to enter the public domain on January 1, 2027.

== Plot ==
Mickey Mouse takes his dog Pluto into the woods for a hunting trip. Pluto is distracted by a flea, and sniffs around the forest, getting bitten on the nose by a bird. He examines a raggedy scarecrow, and is frightened when one of the scarecrow's gloves lands on his tail. He flees – knocking Mickey over – and jumps in the water. When he emerges, more fleas climb onto his back.

Pluto returns to Mickey, who runs him through a series of dog commands – lay down, roll over, sit up and shake hands. When Mickey tells Pluto to "speak", Pluto does a brief Al Jolson impression, kneeling with outstretched paws and saying "Mammy!".

Mickey throws a stick for Pluto, who picks up a larger branch and carries it back to his master. Seeing the antler-like twigs in silhouette, Mickey thinks that Pluto is a moose, and he shoots. He finds Pluto lying motionless, and starts to cry, sobbing, "Oh, what have I done? Don't leave me, pal!" Little does Mickey know that Pluto is actually playing dead. He smiles mischievously and winks at the audience, as Mickey continues to cry. When Mickey begs him to say something, Pluto gets up, looks at him sweetly, and growls, "Kiss me!".

As his dog barks and jumps, Mickey is delighted that Pluto is alive, but they hear a moose call and immediately return to the hunting trip. Pluto sniffs around, but completely misses the moose, who starts snuffling after Pluto instead. Pluto taps Mickey on the shoulder, points at the moose, and barks, "A moose!" Mickey tries to shoot the enormous moose, but his hands shake so much that his gun falls to pieces. The moose chases Mickey and Pluto, but Mickey uses Pluto's flapping ears to get airborne, and they triumphantly fly away, Mickey riding on his dog's back.

== Production ==
This short is the first of six that features Mickey hunting; the theme lasts until R'coon Dawg in 1951.

It includes some recycled animation of Pluto sniffing near the camera from the 1930 short The Chain Gang.

== Reception ==
On the 2004 Walt Disney Treasures DVD set Mickey Mouse in Black and White: Volume Two, The Moose Hunt is in the bonus-features "From the Vault" section, which begins with an introduction by film historian Leonard Maltin explaining the origins of racial stereotypes seen in Disney cartoons of the 1930s and 1940s. The Moose Hunt is included in that group because of Pluto's "Mammy!" impression, which refers to Al Jolson's famous blackface performance, "My Mammy". The 1929 short The Haunted House is also included in that section because of a similar gag featuring Mickey.

In Mickey's Movies: The Theatrical Films of Mickey Mouse, Gijs Grob writes: "Its pace is slow, and it contains some awkward gags, like the flying Pluto finale. Most interestingly, the short features a rare gag breaking the fourth dimension: when Mickey accidentally shoots Pluto, he suddenly addresses the audience with "Is there a doctor in the house?" Such a self-conscious audience gag would remain a rarity at Disney, but it would become a staple gag at Warner Bros. after Tex Avery joined that studio."

On the Disney Film Project, Ryan Kilpatrick points out that Pluto gets more and better gags than Mickey, who was starting to become a more limited character: "Pluto acts just like a dog when he encounters a scarecrow, sniffing around it carefully, waiting for his moment to pounce. Mickey could not have done this, as we would expect him to be more sophisticated. But Pluto's innocence allows for a new range of gags. The Moose Hunt really shows the direction that the Mickey cartoons are heading. Mickey is the framework for the side characters to do great and funny little bits. This would really come to fruition in the color shorts, like Lonesome Ghosts or Clock Cleaners, but it starts back in 1930-1931."

Motion Picture Herald (May 30, 1931): "Here is a great little cartoon comedy number, with Mickey Mouse himself featured in the stellar role of moose hunter. Only the moose turns around and proceeds to hunt Mickey and his hound. The lines are sure-fire and the synchronization touches the Disney par, which is sufficient. Birds, fleas and a skunk for good measure supply the atmosphere. A fine laugh number. Play it, of course."

Variety (June 9, 1931): "Of the Mickey Mouse series and good. Will please anywhere. This time Mickey Mouse is aided by a sniffing hound. The two are out amid whistling trills and music accompaniment on a moose hunt. Hound draws laughs by his sniffling, and as he keeps his nose to the ground and is annoyed by fleas. Before the windup the two do meet a moose. Mickey's gun won't work. Usual chase but it winds okay when Mickey picks up the dog's tail and makes the hound fly through the air to safety. Before that he almost popped the dog dead when he mistook him for an antelope."

The Film Daily (June 14, 1931): "Swell: Right up to the high average on the Mickey Mouse cartoon series. As the title implies, the antics in this case have to do with a moose hunt. Mickey is accompanied by a flea-bitten hound and there is a lot of comedy business dealing with the search for a moose and the failure of the gun to go off when the animal is at bay. There is a fast chase finish, with Mickey and the hound coming winners after a narrow escape. Art work and music excellent."

== Voice cast ==
- Mickey Mouse: Walt Disney
- Pluto, Moose: Pinto Colvig

== Home media ==
The short was released on December 7, 2004, on Walt Disney Treasures: Mickey Mouse in Black and White, Volume Two: 1929-1935.

== Television ==
The Moose Hunt was shown on The Mickey Mouse Club TV show (season 2, episode 77).

== See also ==
- Mickey Mouse (film series)
