= Playful Pan =

1930 film by Burt Gillett

- Title card
- Directed by: Burt Gillett
- Produced by: Walt Disney
- Music by: Bert Lewis
- Color process: Black and white
- Production company: Walt Disney Productions
- Distributed by: Columbia Pictures
- Release date: December 27, 1930
- Running time: 7 min
- Country: United States
- Language: English

Playful Pan is a 1930 American animated short film directed by Burt Gillett. It was released on December 27, 1930. It is the fifteenth film in the Silly Symphonies series. The short's copyright was renewed, and it entered the public domain on January 1, 2026. (Note: While the short's copyright was registered in 1931 under R225427, it was released in 1930 and will enter the public domain based on that earlier date.)

The film

== Plot ==
The short features the mythological god Pan playing his pan flute for the entertainment of the forest dwellers. When a lightning strike starts a forest fire, Pan leads the flames to the water, putting out the fire.

== Reception ==
Variety (April 22, 1931) called the short an "excellent cartoon", saying: "It elicits laughs all the way and is beautifully synchronized to fit a novel idea, that of Peter Pan with his pipes, stirring animals and insects on the arrival of spring. Too much repetition in opening shots. Last three or four minutes of short devoted to a forest fire with the shooting flames represented as living characters and jumping on to everything, chasing woods inhabitants to cover. They run for Pan and he charms them with music until all jump into a pool of water where he stands. This part of short actually very funny. Longer than most cartoons, but worth the footage."

== Home media ==
The short was released on December 19, 2006, on Walt Disney Treasures: More Silly Symphonies, Volume Two.
