= Midnight in a Toy Shop =

1930 film by Wilfred Jackson

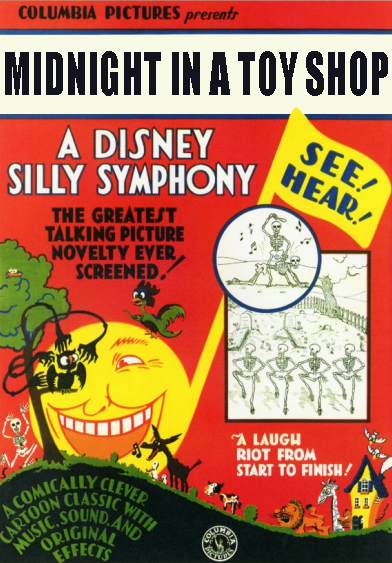
- Directed by: Wilfred Jackson
- Produced by: Walt Disney
- Color process: Black and white
- Production company: Walt Disney Productions
- Distributed by: Columbia Pictures
- Release date: July 3, 1930
- Running time: 7 min
- Country: United States
- Language: English

The short film

Midnight in a Toy Shop is a 1930 American animated short film directed by Wilfred Jackson. It is the twelfth film in the Silly Symphonies series.

== Plot ==
Outside, in the middle of a snowstorm, a poor spider clings onto his web beside the hanging sign of a toyshop but is thrown off by the powerful wind. He sneaks in through the door's keyhole and finds himself inside the shop, where he has fun mimicking the sound of a ticking cuckoo clock. When the clock's bird pops out to strike the hour, the spider hides inside a box. When the bird goes back into the clock, the spider creeps along the store's floor. He walks backward and bumps into a large pile of alphabet cubes, the cubes all fall down and scare the spider. As the spider runs away from the fallen cubes, he trips over a wind-up toy car which activates and drives around him in circles. When the car stops driving, the spider looks pleased and laughs joyfully. The spider keeps walking along the store's floor but then gets scared by the barking of a toy dog, he runs away but then bumps into a jack-in-the-box. The clown pops out of its box and flails around laughing, the spider screams in fear and runs to a more darkened area of the store. There, with a lit candle to guide him, he finds a toy piano (with a tag on it that says "$1.98" on it) and decides to play a little tune. As he plays the piano, some dolls on a shelf start dancing and singing. After that, the spider climbs onto a little table and turns on a record player, the wooden marionette above it starts dancing as the record spins. The spider looks happy and mimics the marionette's movements and soon all the toys in the store come to life and suddenly start dancing. The spider finds two monkey-like puppets, puts them on his hands, and makes them dance on some alphabet cubes. A group of teddy bears starts making music, two other ones ring a bunch of little bells. The spider plays with a toy cash register and a drum, rolls on a ball, and plays with the toy dog from before. He tries his hand at being the dancing marionette but is thrown off the record player. He flies across the store and, holding onto the still-lit candle, lands in a box of fireworks. When the candle's flame causes all the fireworks to explode in a massive flurry, the spider is terrorized and screams in pain when one of the fireworks burns his bottom. The spider runs away from a bunch of firecrackers and jumps out through the keyhole, the short film ends with the firecrackers exploding inside the store.

== Reception ==
Motion Picture Herald (May 2, 1931): "A Silly Symphony number which has the merit of lightness, and general amusement. A spider gets badly mixed up in a toy shop. All the little whatevers in the place sing in different keys as the spider spoils their play. The youngsters should enjoy it very much, and the oldsters will be entertained."

== Home media ==
The short was released on December 19, 2006, on Walt Disney Treasures: More Silly Symphonies, Volume Two in the "From the Vault" section, because of racial stereotypes: the Topsy doll yelling "Mammy!"
