= Frolicking Fish =

1930 film by Burt Gillett

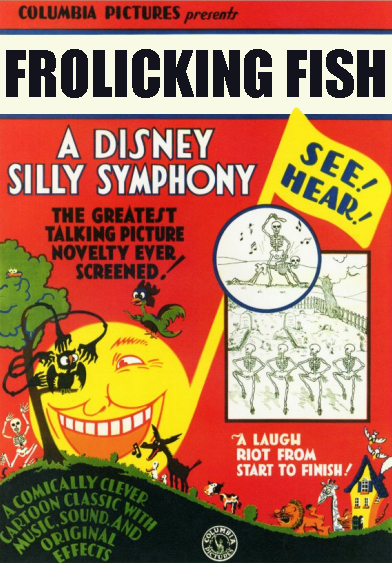
- Directed by: Burt Gillett
- Produced by: Walt Disney
- Music by: Bert Lewis
- Backgrounds by: Emil Flohri; Carlos Manríquez
- Production company: Walt Disney Productions
- Distributed by: Columbia Pictures
- Release date: May 8, 1930
- Running time: 6:02
- Country: United States
- Language: English

The short film

Frolicking Fish is a 1930 American animated short film directed by Burt Gillett. It is the ninth film in the Silly Symphonies series. Original release prints were printed on green stock to produce a green hue, none of which have survived.

== Summary ==
The animals dance and make music at the bottom of the sea. At sea, a fish rides on a seahorse, while another fish plays with a huge anchor. A group of fish dance around a chest. An angry octopus comes out of the chest and tries to catch the fish, but they escape. Then the octopus comes out of the chest. Near a boat a fish dance takes place, led by two sea lobsters. In another orchestra, a narwhal leads three fish, who play bucios and a fish skeleton with its maracas. A lobster plays a harmonica. Starfish and clams (located behind the stars) also dance in a line. A group of fish jump on the stomach of a larger fish, one at a time, causing the fish to expel a bubble for each fish that jumps on it. The fish, once they leave the big fish behind, play with the bubbles. The octopus pops the bubbles. A bubble encloses a fish that was playing with it. The octopus plays with the bubble, but the fish manages to get out of it and the octopus chases it. The fish pushes a boat anchor and it crushes the octopus.

== Reception ==
The Film Daily (September 28, 1930): "An undersea exhibition that keeps the patrons chuckling all the way. All sorts of fantastic fish are put through a dizzy series of dances, drills and whatnot, in tune to some unusually fitting music. The chief amusement is provided by a villainous octopus chasing a fish, but the wicked one is given the k.o. in the end when the smart little fish drops an anchor on him from a sunken vessel. One of the best in the Silly Symphonies series".

Motion Picture News (September 27, 1930): "This Walt Disney cartoon packs all the stuff you've seen time after time with fishes instead of delirium tremens animals, dancing, talking, singing and cavorting about. Didn't get a chuckle out of a New York audience. The public is fed up on this type of stuff".

Variety (September 24, 1930): "Entertaining musical cartoon comedy. Scenes are all under water, with the cartoon characters all fish. Fish dance and sing and are given comedy musical synchronization. Octopus is the villain and gets his at the end, when he chases a fish through a sunken ship. Anchor falls and squashes him".

== Home media ==
The short was released on December 19, 2006, on Walt Disney Treasures: More Silly Symphonies, Volume Two.
