= Cannibal Capers =

1930 film by Burt Gillett

- Title card
- Directed by: Burt Gillett
- Produced by: Walt Disney
- Music by: Bert Lewis
- Backgrounds by: Carlos Manriquez
- Production company: Walt Disney Productions
- Distributed by: Columbia Pictures
- Release date: March 13, 1930
- Running time: 5:56
- Country: United States
- Language: English

Cannibal Capers is a 1930 American animated short film directed by Burt Gillett. It is the eighth film in the Silly Symphonies series. It was released on March 13, 1930.

Since the cartoon was published 1930, it entered the public domain in the United States on January 1, 2026.

The film

== Plot ==
The film begins with a group of cannibals gathering together for a tribal dance. The dance is later interrupted by a fierce lion who engages in a silly chase with one of the cannibals. The film ends with all of the cannibals surrounding the hysterical lion.

== Reception ==
The Film Daily (July 13, 1930): "One of Walt Disney's best Silly Symphonies to date. After the little band of cannibals have disported awhile in highly amusing fashion, a ferocious lion turns up and the whole gang takes to its heels. The cannibals' intended victim, however, jumps out of the boiling pot and gives the lion the run-around, winding up by getting hold of the lion's false teeth and using them to scare the jungle beast out of his skin."

Billboard (July 19, 1930): "Plenty of laughs to this animated cartoon of the Walt Disney Silly Symphony series. The conveying of numerous byplays sparkling with originality and cleverness, is a big factor in mirth producing, tho there's no overlooking the skillful animation... Strongest risibility tickler is the battle between a lion and the cannibals. Lion first chases the black-skin around, but the worm turns and the fellow has the battle won. Book this to give your audience laughs."

== Home media ==
The short was released on December 19, 2006, on Walt Disney Treasures: More Silly Symphonies, Volume Two in the "From the Vault" section, because of the depiction of African natives (because the film was targeting adult audiences). Two versions of the short are included: the original theatrical release and the 1950s version for television with the ending cut short.
