= Night (1930 film) =

1930 film by Walt Disney

- Directed by: Walt Disney
- Produced by: Walt Disney
- Music by: Bert Lewis
- Color process: Black and white
- Production company: Walt Disney Productions
- Distributed by: Columbia Pictures
- Release date: July 31, 1930
- Running time: 7 minutes
- Country: United States
- Language: English

Night is a 1930 American animated short film directed by Walt Disney. It is the eleventh film in the Silly Symphonies series and the last to be directed by Disney before he sidelined to become the series' producer. Original prints have the film tinted blue, none of which have survived.

The film

== Plot ==
Ripples on the water dance, the moon sings along. A male owl flies to a female owls tree, the two court until the male kisses the female, which gets angry at the male and punches his feathers out. Moths fly around a flame, one moth taunts the flame before it subsequently gets burnt. fireflies blink their lights in harmony, two fireflies dance together. Three mosquitos stalk a frog, they bite it, yet the frog eats them. The frogs finds a female of his kind and sets up a small orchestra of a lean frog, a toad, and three small frogs, however, some fish interrupt the moment. The male frog does a solo to the female, and unlike the owl, he succeeds in wooing the female. They jump and kiss until they fall down a waterfall, ending the film.

== Reception ==
Variety (May 14, 1930): "Another of those Silly Symphonies from the Disney pen, and very good. Plenty funny, this one, with some new animation tricks to intrigue the trade as well as the public. It can play to any capacity and click. Script layout is episodic, change in characters coinciding with the switch in melodies. Principal innovation accompanies the well-known "Glow Worm" tune, fireflies in flight lighting up in cadence with the music. As far as known it's the first time in any cartoon for this effect. Otherwise, the moon "tra-la's" an accompaniment as its beams frolic on the water, there are a couple of comedy owls, and a bullfrog chorus which slightly slows up the pace but which can be cut at will without smearing the main impression. A trio of mosquitoes and a pair of ingenuous prancing bugs, unfolding the well-known mannerisms of hoofers, add to the merit of the reel. Old folks, as well as the kids, have evidenced a strong liking for this series. They won't be disappointed in Night."

Motion Picture News (June 28, 1930): "Clever: A lot of fun in this nonsensical cartoon. Owls performing jazz steps on water lilies; wasps turning collegiate; and even the man in the moon going in for the shimmy. Nicely synchronized and extremely diverting. Fine for any bill and particularly adaptable for hot weather entertainment. Recommended with no reservations."

== Home media ==
The short was released on December 19, 2006, on Walt Disney Treasures: More Silly Symphonies, Volume Two.
