= The Chain Gang (1930 film) =

1930 film by Burt Gillett

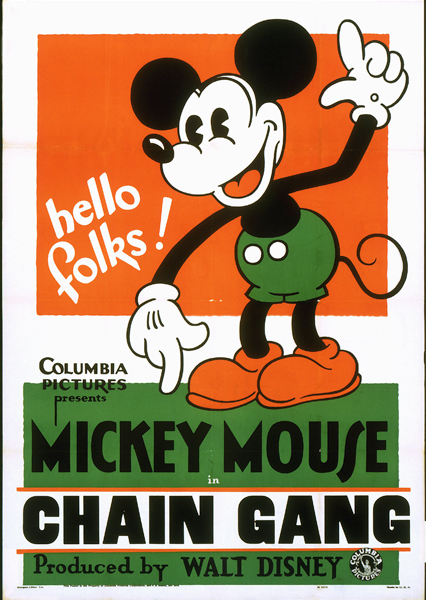
- Poster
- Directed by: Burt Gillett
- Produced by: Walt Disney
- Starring: Walt Disney; Lee Millar
- Music by: Bert Lewis
- Color process: Black-and-white
- Production company: Walt Disney Productions
- Distributed by: Columbia Pictures
- Release date: September 5, 1930
- Running time: 7:57
- Country: United States
- Language: English

The Chain Gang is a 1930 American animated comedy short film directed by Burt Gillett. It is the 21st film of the Mickey Mouse series.

Since the cartoon was published 1930, it entered the public domain in the United States on January 1, 2026.

== Plot ==
The full short film.

Mickey Mouse is in prison, connected with a chain to six other prisoners as they are led out to the yard for hard labor. He keeps a cheery grin, banging on the iron ball and singing, until the prison guard, Peg-Leg Pete, tells him to shut up. The prisoners break rocks, but when the guard falls asleep at his post, Mickey plays Vernon Dalhart's "The Prisoner's Song" on his harmonica. The other prisoners join in with the song, singing and using their implements as instruments.

One of the inmates dances to the tune of Felix Mendelssohn's "Spring Song", but when he spits on the guard, Pete wakes up and whistles for help. This starts a prison riot, and the guards shoot at the prisoners. Mickey uses a seesaw to fly over the prison wall, and escapes into the nearby woods.

Mickey is chased into a swamp by a guard accompanied by two bloodhounds, and tries to get away by riding a pair of horses. With the horses out of control, Mickey flies off a cliff, which happens to be right above the prison. He falls through the roof into a cell, where two inmates happily sing "We're Here Because We're Here". Mickey joins in for the final iris out.

== Legacy ==
In a scene animated by Norm Ferguson, Mickey is chased by two bloodhounds after his prison break. Each hound approaches and sniffs, then barks directly into the camera. According to Gijs Grob in Mickey's Movies: "These hounds are possibly the most elaborately designed and most naturally behaving animals in any theatrical cartoon hitherto, and would become the prototype of Pluto". In 1932, Disney's in-house art instructor Don Graham said: "The dogs were alive, real. They seemed to breathe. They moved like dogs, not drawings of dogs. The drawings explained not so much what a real dog looked like, but what a real dog did".

== Voice cast ==
- Bloodhounds: Lee Millar

== Reception ==
Variety: "One of the most amusing cartoons released. Has to do with animal prison. 'Volga Boatman' and 'Prison Song' theming. Usual method of using each other's tails or hoofs for instruments. A jailbreak is used effectively".

== Home media ==
The short was released on December 2, 2002, on Walt Disney Treasures: Mickey Mouse in Black and White and on December 7, 2004, on Walt Disney Treasures: The Complete Pluto: 1930–1947.
