= Jack Cutting (animator) =

American international supervisor and animator for Disney

- Born: January 19, 1908; New York City, New York
- Died: August 17, 1988 (aged 80); North Hollywood, California
- Occupation: Head of Disney's Foreign Department
- Years active: 1929–1975

Jack A. Cutting (January 19, 1908 – August 17, 1988) was an American international content supervisor and animator for Walt Disney Animation Studios, where he worked for 46 years.

== Biography ==
Cutting was born on January 9, 1908, in New York City. He attended the Otis College of Art and Design, where he met Tyrus Wong, Wilfred Jackson, and John Hench and graduated in 1929. A friend referred him to the fledgling Walt Disney Studios, where he was hired to a group of 19 animators in August/September 1929. He worked alongside Walt Disney himself and made $18.00 a week, oftentimes working overtime without pay. He worked in several different departments, starting as an animator, moving up to director, then to assistant director; he was also Dave Hand's assistant. When the United States entered World War II, Disney submitted the necessary paperwork to waive his employees of their service so the company could direct training films for the army. Cutting headed the Editorial Department for a year during the war. Cutting was one of the several employees who played polo with Walt Disney; he also was sent to "scout for merry-go-rounds in Europe" after Disney had the idea for a theme park. In 1939, his film The Ugly Duckling won the 1940 Oscar in Best Short Subject (Cartoons).

After Snow White and the Seven Dwarfs was released, Cutting convinced Roy Disney to let him work with the man hired to dub the film; he quickly became a dubbing assistant and by 1938 was head of the Foreign Department at Disney. In this role, he supervised translation and dubbing efforts all over the world, traveling often to work with different teams. He oversaw the dubbing of and found voice actors for the Swedish Dumbo, the French Mary Poppins, and the Japanese One Hundred and One Dalmatians in Japanese. He was among the frontrunners for synchronizing sound and image. He held his position in the Foreign Department until his retirement in 1975.

Cutting and his wife Camille lived in Paris while Cutting worked with European markets. They had at least one son, Phil. Cutting died on August 17, 1988, in North Hollywood, California.

== Filmography ==
Year	Title	Role/s	Notes	Ref
1930	Autumn	Animator	Short; uncredited	
1930	Summer	Animator	Short	
1930	The Chain Gang	Animator	Short; uncredited	
1930	The Picnic	Animator	Short; uncredited	
1930	Winter	Animator	Short; uncredited	
1930	Pioneer Days	Animator	Short; uncredited	
1930	Playful Pan	Animator	Short; uncredited	
1931	The Birthday Party	Animator	Short; uncredited	
1931	Birds of a Feather	Animator	Short; uncredited	
1931	The Fox Hunt	Animator	Short	
1931	The Spider and the Fly	Animator	Short	
1931	The Castaway	Animator	Short; uncredited	
1931	The Busy Beavers	Animator	Short	
1931	The China Plate	Animator	Short; uncredited	
1931	Blue Rhythm	Animator	Short; uncredited	
1931	Fishin' Around	Animator	Short; uncredited	
1931	The Beach Party	Animator	Short; uncredited	
1931	The Ugly Duckling	Animator	Short; uncredited	
1932	Santa's Workshop	Animator	Short; uncredited	
1932	Flowers and Trees			
1933	The Mail Pilot	Animator	Short; uncredited	
1933	Father Noah's Ark	Animator	Short	
1934	The Goddess of Spring	Assistant animator	Short	
1935	Three Orphan Kittens	Animator	Short	
1936	Three Little Wolves	Assistant director	Short; uncredited	
1936	Three Blind Mouseketeers	Assistant director	Short; uncredited	
1936	More Kittens	Assistant director	Short; uncredited	
1938	Farmyard Symphony	Director	Short; uncredited	
1939	The Ugly Duckling	Director	Short; uncredited	
1939	Beach Picnic	Assistant director	Short; uncredited	
1939	Officer Duck	Assistant Director	Short; uncredited	
1941	The Reluctant Dragon	Director	Cartoon sequences; uncredited	
1942	South of the Border with Disney	Director, foreign supervisor	Short documentary; uncredited	
1942	Saludos Amigos	Foreign supervisor	Short	
1942	Aquarela do Brasil	Foreign supervisor	Short	
1943	The Grain That Built a Hemisphere	Director	Documentary short; earlier cartoon clips, uncredited	
1943	Chicken Little	Director	Short; earlier cartoon clips, uncredited	
1944	The Three Caballeros	Brazilian and Spanish supervisor		
1945	Health for the Americas: Cleanliness Brings Health	Foreign supervisor	Documentary short; uncredited	
1948	Melody Time	Foreign supervisor	Uncredited	
1948	Blame it on the Samba	Foreign supervisor	Short; uncredited	
1951	Chicken in the Rough	Director	Short; earlier cartoon clips, uncredited	
1955	Lady and the Tramp	Director	Earlier cartoon clips; uncredited	
1960	Donald Duck and his Companions	Director		
1978	The Small One	Director	Short; earlier cartoon clips, uncredited	
1984	DTV: Golden Oldies	Director		
