= The Academy Award Review of Walt Disney Cartoons =

1937 film

- Poster
- Directed by: Burt Gillett; Wilfred Jackson; David Hand
- Produced by: Walt Disney
- Production company: Walt Disney Productions
- Distributed by: United Artists
- Release date: May 19, 1937
- Running time: 41 minutes
- Country: United States
- Language: English
- Box office: $45.472

The Academy Award Review of Walt Disney Cartoons is an American animated package film produced by Walt Disney Productions. It was released in the United States on May 19, 1937. It was commissioned by United Artists to capitalize on the upcoming release of Snow White and the Seven Dwarfs, which was distributed by rival company RKO Radio Pictures. It was a collection of five Oscar-winning Silly Symphonies shorts, bridged together with title cards and a narrator. Like The Many Adventures of Winnie the Pooh, each of the cartoons had been released on their own at first before being collected together as one film. The separate cartoon shorts are now available on DVD. In addition, the film is 41 minutes long, just like Saludos Amigos. However, while this film is fully animated, Saludos Amigos would be far shorter without the live-action sequences. It is considered the first feature-length film in the Walt Disney Pictures filmography.

The Academy Award Review of Walt Disney Cartoons was re-released and updated with additional four shorts in 1966 with no narration.

Both versions of the film were released in Japan on LaserDisc on June 21, 1985.

== Film segments ==
The original film consists of the following five shorts. All pre-1935 cartoons received newly drawn title cards to replace the plain text original titles.

- Flowers and Trees (1932)
- Three Little Pigs (1933)
- The Tortoise and the Hare (1934)
- Three Orphan Kittens (1935)
- The Country Cousin (1936)

The following additional shorts were included in the 1966 release.

- The Old Mill (1937)
- Ferdinand the Bull (1938)
- The Ugly Duckling (1939)
- Lend a Paw (1941)

== See also ==
- List of animated feature films
- List of package films
