= Three Orphan Kittens =

- A screenshot of the film's title card.
- Directed by: David Hand
- Story by: William Cottrell; Joe Grant
- Produced by: Walt Disney
- Starring: Leone LeDoux; Esther Campbell
- Music by: Frank Churchill
- Animation by: Ken Anderson; Bob Wickersham; Fred Moore; Hamilton Luske
- Layouts by: Ken Anderson
- Color process: Technicolor
- Production company: Walt Disney Productions
- Distributed by: United Artists
- Release date: October 26, 1935 (US)
- Running time: 8:55
- Country: United States
- Language: English
- Budget: $25,771.24

Three Orphan Kittens is a 1935 animated short film in the Silly Symphonies series produced by Walt Disney Productions. It was the winner of the 1935 Oscar for Academy Award for Best Short Subject (Cartoons). It was followed in 1936 by a sequel, More Kittens.

== Plot ==
The film tells the story of three kittens, one black, one orange and one grey, and their adventures in a house. It begins with the kittens left out in the snow. They then notice the house nearby and enter it for shelter. They arrive at its kitchen, and begin to play there after the house's Black mammy housekeeper has finished preparing a meal. After more playing in various areas of the house, the film switches its focus to one particular kitten, the black one, who is chasing a feather and eventually ends up on a pianola keyboard. The kitten starts to play with the feather walking down the piano keyboard and the feather lands on the "on" switch which the kitten presses and the then-revealed pianola begins to play; ironically it is playing a variation of "Kitten on the Keys", a song composed by Zez Confrey in 1921. The other two kittens rejoin the first and play around the pianola. When the pianola finishes its song, the kittens leave it and are caught by the housekeeper. As she prepares to throw them out, she is stopped by a little girl who decides to adopt the kittens.

== Production ==
Story development on the film started in February of 1934, with inspiration coming from the iconic nursery rhyme Three Little Kittens and from strangers who dropped stray cats near the Disney Hyperion Studio. The short was also given the production # of US 30 with a temporarily working title "Three Little Kittens". Animation started in March 25 of 1935 where the animators studied real kittens, and observed their movement and expressions to give more realistic animation to the kittens in the film. This served at the time, as animation experimentation for other future works to be produced by the Disney Studio, most notably Snow White and the Seven Dwarfs. A list of which animators animated which scene is listed down below.

- Bob Wickersham: Everything in the beginning until the kittens get on the kitchen table, and kittens playing in the nursery.
- Fred Moore: Kittens on the dinner table.
- Ham Luske: Kittens on the piano until the end.
- Ken Anderson: Furniture and walls in the three-dimensional scenes (Bob animated the kittens in those sequences).

Photography for the film started in August 31 and lasted until October 3 of 1935, and the film was finished and delivered on October 15 of the same year.

The film was produced as an entry in Disney's Silly Symphonies series. At the time, the Symphonies were being used as a vehicle to test the techniques which would be used in Snow White and the Seven Dwarfs and to provide an informal on-the-job training program to prepare artists for the elaborate scenes that would be included in the studio's feature-length productions. As such, the films were intended to focus on the characters, which were intended to be cute, rather than a particularly developed narrative. There is also a tracking camera sequence in the cartoon where the kittens are running past and between a table, chairs and a piano on a wooden floor, all of it redrawn for every frame, to give it a three dimensional appearance. Ken Anderson animated the furniture and walls, while Bob Wickersham animated the kittens. It was directed by David Hand, who would later direct Snow White, and animated by Ken Anderson. Like all Silly Symphonies made after 1932 (excluding Bugs in Love), it was produced in three-strip Technicolor. The film was copyrighted on November 20, 1935, nearly a month after its release.

== Releases ==
The film was originally released theatrically in the United States on October 26, 1935. In the same year it also had a New York Opening that lasted from 21-27 of November at the Radio City Music Hall, accompanied by Crime & Punishment. Later in 1936, it was screened between 20-26 of February in Los Angeles at the Filmarte with the film The Informer. In 1937 and 1966, it was re-released as part of the Academy Award Review of Walt Disney Cartoons, along with four other Academy Award-winning Disney shorts.

== Home media ==
In 1993, it appeared in a compilation of Award-winning Disney shorts entitled How the Best Was Won in VHS and Laserdisc. It has also been found on VHS tapes of Dumbo, along with Father Noah's Ark and The Practical Pig.

The short was released on December 19, 2006, on Walt Disney Treasures: More Silly Symphonies, Volume Two.

== Censorship ==
The original version of Three Orphan Kittens contains a scene in which the black kitten encounters a doll that, when flipped by the kitten, becomes a stereotypical African-American girl, which shouts "Mammy!" (a recycled voice clip from Santa's Workshop). At the time, this was a pretty common gag not only cartoons, but in live action features too. Nevertheless, during the 1950s and 1960s, when Disney began editing their cartoons before they were broadcast on television, the scene was removed from the film. The film appears uncensored on the 2006 DVD More Silly Symphonies, where it is placed in a section entitled "From the Vault" along with other cartoons featuring stereotypes, which is prefaced with an introduction by Leonard Maltin.

The film also contains a stereotypical African-American maid called Mammy Twoshoes. Although the character has not been removed in all of its previous releases since 1935, it's one of the main reasons (along with the black doll gag) why Three Orphan Kittens, probably won't be expecting any future home video, or theatrical releases.

== Reception ==
The Film Daily (Oct 31, 1935): "Looks as if Walt Disney has hit on something as entrancing as his three little pigs in these three kittens... The three cute kittens will prove a wow — especially in that sequence where they go to bat with the automatic playing piano and come off second best. That piece of business is a laugh riot."

National Exhibitor (Nov 20, 1935): "The three kittens come in out of the snow storm, upset household, exploring in the kitchen and parlor, spilling pies, smashing furniture. Excellent color and appealing characterizations of kittens mark this. Excellent."

Boxoffice (Dec 7, 1935): "Walt Disney's latest Silly Symphony promises to attract the popularity of his Three Little Pigs, certainly one of finest cartoon subjects ever produced. The kittens of the title role are just as cute as the little porkies of the previous short, while their adventures are so delightfully amusing that the patrons will exit from the theatre singing its praises... [The player-piano] proves to be the picture's high spot and will keep audiences in a riot of laughter. Color work is again excellent, short is ideal for youngsters, perfect for adults, and will fit into any bill, any time, any where."

== Legacy & Accolades ==
The short film won the Academy Award for Best Short Subject of 1935 (Cartoon), and in the Venice Film Festival on 1936 won a special medal, along with Who Killed Cock Robin and On Ice. The film turned out to be a success that it led to a follow up sequel called More Kittens in 1936.

A cameo of Fluffy (the orange kitten) later appeared in New Shoes, a short of the Mickey Mouse 2013 TV series.

== Comic adaptation ==
The Silly Symphony Sunday comic strip ran a three-month-long adaptation of Three Orphan Kittens called "Three Little Kittens" from July 28 to October 20, 1935.

== Voice cast ==
- Lillian Randolph as Mammy Two Shoes
- Leone LeDoux as Little Girl and Kittens
- Esther Campbell as Kittens
