= Marion Darlington =

American voice actress (1910–1991)

Marion Darlington (November 7, 1910 – March 17, 1991) was an American voice actress known for supplying the bird whistling and animal sound effects in films including Cinderella, Snow White, Bambi, and Pinocchio. She also voiced the bird chorus in Walt Disney's Enchanted Tiki Room.

== Personal life ==
Marion Elizabeth Sevier was born on November 7, 1910 in Monrovia, California.

She attended the California School of Artistic Whistling, founded by Agnes Woodward in Los Angeles and emerged as one of its most famous graduates. In the 1940s she was an instructor of “artistic whistling” from her home, and gave performances with her students.

She married Keith Darlington in 1930, and was widowed in 1937. In 1943 she married trumpeter Don Pratt. They moved to Sedona, Arizona where in 1960 they started Pink Jeep Tours. They were later divorced. In 1974 she married Willis Maley.

Darlington died on March 17, 1991 in Sedona, Arizona.

== Acting career ==
Darlington's early musical skill in whistling led her to perform on the radio, accompanied by Herbert Nixon on the Wurlizer in 1929 with the Harmony Trio in 1930, as part of the J.C. Penney nightly dinner program, along with Hawaiian guitar players and Spanish singers in 1930, and with Raymond Paige’s orchestra, among others. From this exposure, she was sought out by film companies and radio shows to do sound effects.

She provided bird song for many early Disney shorts, including their first Academy Award-winning short "Flowers and Trees," and cartoon shorts from Warner Brothers. Darlington was also featured in a number of Disney feature films, including the solo whistling part of the little bird paired up in a call-and-response session with Snow White, supplying the birdsong with the tune “Whistle While you Work,” as well as whistling all the groups of bird songs in that film. She also provided the whistling for Give a Little Whistle in Pinocchio.

Throughout her career, Darlington also produced the sounds in films of crickets, bees, bluejays, grouse, peacocks and parrots, and bigger animals such as penguins, hyenas and the voice of Cheetah in Tarzan films. She also supplied the whistling for film actors including Reginald Gardiner, Dorothy Lamour, George Montgomery, Eileen Heckart, and Audrey Hepburn.

Darlington was able to whistle duets and trios with herself, providing all the voices for multiple characters. With a repertoire of 5000 bird calls she was known as the “Bird Voice of the Movies.”

== Filmography ==
- 1931: Birds of a Feather
- 1931: The Cat's Out
- 1931: The Delivery Boy
- 1931: Mother Goose Melodies
- 1931: Mickey Cuts Up
- 1931: Mickey Steps Out
- 1932: The Bird Store
- 1932: The Duck Hunt
- 1932: Flowers and Trees
- 1933: Birds in the Spring
- 1933: The Pet Store
- 1933: The Pied Piper
- 1934: The Flying Mouse
- 1934: Pop Goes Your Heart
- 1935: Water Babies
- 1936: The Early Bird and the Worm
- 1936: Birds in Love
- 1937: Snow White and the Seven Dwarfs
- 1938: The Fox Hunt
- 1939: One Mother's Family
- 1939: The Bear that Couldn’t Sleep
- 1939: The Blue Danube
- 1940: Elmer's Candid Camera
- 1940: A Wild Hare
- 1940: Pinocchio
- 1942: Bambi
- 1942: Beyond the Blue Horizon
- 1942: My Favorite Blonde
- 1942: Obliging Young Lady
- 1948: Pluto's Fledgling
- 1948: So Dear to My Heart
- 1949: The Counterfeit Cat
- 1950: Cinderella
- 1953: Bright Road
- 1959: Sleeping Beauty
- 1959: The Diary of Anne Frank
- 1959: Green Mansions
