= The China Shop =

- Directed by: Wilfred Jackson
- Produced by: Walt Disney
- Music by: Leigh Harline
- Animation by: Art Babbitt; Hamilton Luske; Ben Sharpsteen; Cy Young; Roy Williams; Jack Kinney; Louie Schmitt; Leonard Sebring; Dick Lundy; Frenchy de Tremaudan; Dick Heumer; Archie Robin; Fred Moore
- Color process: Technicolor
- Production company: Walt Disney Productions
- Distributed by: United Artists
- Release date: January 13, 1934
- Running time: 8 minutes
- Country: United States
- Language: English

The China Shop, based on the fairy tale "The Shepherdess and the Chimney Sweep" by Hans Christian Andersen, is an animated short film produced by Walt Disney, part of the Silly Symphonies series. The short was released on January 13, 1934 and was directed by Wilfred Jackson.

== Plot ==
It's closing time at "Ye Olde China Shop". The china pieces come to life to dance. A china demon kidnaps a female figurine, and the male figurine tries to rescue her. A fight ensues, with the china demon throwing dishes at the male figurine. The battle damages both an ostrich figurine and one of the monkey figurines. The demon is defeated as he is broken into pieces. The next morning when the owner arrives and sees the damage, he sells the china as antiques.

== Home media ==
The short was released on December 19, 2006, on Walt Disney Treasures: More Silly Symphonies, Volume Two in the "From the Vault" section. Prior to that, the featurette also appeared on the Walt Disney Cartoon Classics Limited Gold Edition: Silly Symphonies VHS in the 1980s.

Also, the short was included in the bonus on the 2010 Diamond Edition Blu-ray of Beauty and the Beast.
