= The Night Before Christmas (1933 film) =

1933 film by Walt Disney

- Directed by: Wilfred Jackson
- Produced by: Walt Disney
- Music by: Leigh Harline
- Animation by: Dick Huemer
- Color process: Technicolor
- Production company: Walt Disney Productions
- Distributed by: United Artists
- Release date: December 9, 1933
- Running time: 8 minutes
- Country: United States
- Language: English

The Night Before Christmas, also known as Santa's Toys, is a 1933 American pre-Code animated short film produced by Walt Disney Productions and released by United Artists. Part of the Silly Symphonies series, the film is an adaptation of Clement Clarke Moore's 1823 poem "A Visit from St. Nicholas", popularly called "The Night Before Christmas". The film was directed by Disney animator Wilfred Jackson.

== Plot ==
In a loose adaptation of Clement C. Moore's famous poem, St. Nick is seen delivering the toys that he made in Disney's Santa's Workshop (1932) to a house full of sleeping children. The toys come alive, and they dance around and have fun. The kids awake to find a beautiful Christmas tree with many toys.

== Home media ==
The short was released on DVD on December 19, 2006, on Walt Disney Treasures: More Silly Symphonies, Volume Two. It is also available on the DVD Celebrate Christmas with Mickey, Donald & Friends.

== See also ==
- List of Christmas films
- Santa Claus in film
