= The Clock Shop =

1931 film by Wilfred Jackson

- Title card
- Directed by: Wilfred Jackson
- Produced by: Walt Disney
- Music by: Frank Churchill
- Color process: Black and white
- Production company: Walt Disney Productions
- Distributed by: Columbia Pictures
- Release date: September 28, 1931
- Running time: 7 min
- Country: United States
- Language: English

The Clock Shop is a 1931 American animated short film directed by Wilfred Jackson. It is the 22nd film of the Silly Symphonies series. Due to Columbia Pictures' poor preservation of old films, the only surviving print is an existing vault print retained by Disney titled The Clock Store.

== Plot ==
The various clocks and watches in a clock store dance, ring alarms musically, and otherwise entertain the audience in an after hours presentation.

== Reception ==
Variety (November 17, 1931): "Familiar idea of clocks and figures gyrating to musical rhythm. Done before and under the same name if memory recalls, but with live figures instead of cartoon. Here as a cartoon offering a pleasant novelty filler for any program, although not hilariously so".

== Home media ==
The short was released on December 19, 2006, on Walt Disney Treasures: More Silly Symphonies, Volume Two.
