= Water Babies (1935 film) =

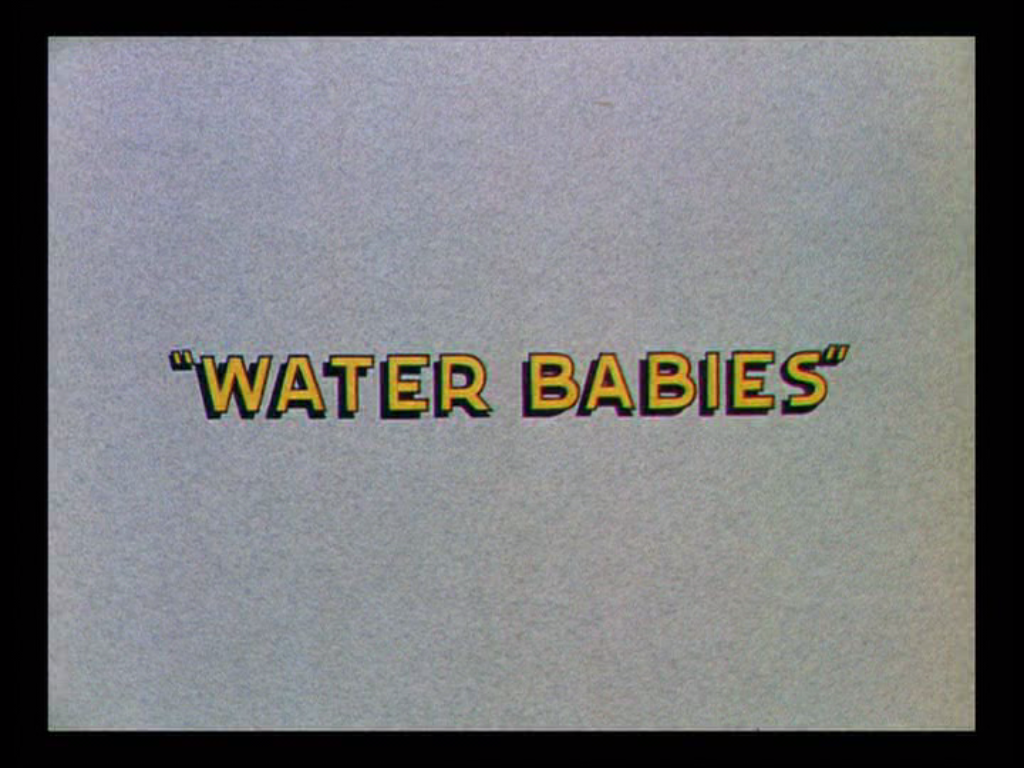
- Title card from Disney short Water Babies (1935)
- Directed by: Wilfred Jackson
- Production company: Walt Disney Productions
- Distributed by: United Artists
- Release date: May 11, 1935

Water Babies is a Walt Disney produced Silly Symphonies animated short film released on May 11, 1935, by United Artists. The cartoon was directed by Wilfred Jackson. It features 2-inch-tall nude babies playing games in and out of the water. The babies are all completely identical other than the color of their hair. The edited version of the film eliminates some shots that feature nude baby bottoms as a sight gag.

This short was followed in 1938 by a sequel short, Merbabies.

== Plot ==
The film begins with several water lilies opening to reveal a 2-inch-tall water baby sleeping in each one. The babies immediately awaken and leap into the water, except for one reluctant, redheaded baby who is assisted by hard slaps on the bottom from his water lily. As the babies play, the redheaded baby is being dunked repeatedly by two others. He finally comes up bottom-first and the other two babies spank him back underwater. Then, flowers played as horns sound and the babies all ride swans, fish, turtles, or leaf boats to the shore where they swing on vines and play with animals. In one scene, three babies, wearing chaps made from leaves and nothing else, ride on frogs rodeo-style. In another scene, a baby torero, wearing only a blade of grass sash and an acorn montera, attempts to fight a bullfrog. But the frog instead manages to pen the torero and bows in triumph to the audience. Finally, the babies take another ride back to their lily pads, recite Now I Lay Me Down to Sleep, and lay down in their flower beds.

== Voice cast ==
- Whistling: Marion Darlington
- Water babies: Leone Ledoux

== Home media ==
The short was released on December 4, 2001, on Walt Disney Treasures: Silly Symphonies - The Historic Musical Animated Classics as a hidden easter egg found in the "Fables and Fairy Tales" section.
