= Disneyland 10th Anniversary =

- Walt Disney's Wonderful World of Color episode
- Walt Disney uses a maquette to demonstrate the planned action of an Audio-animatronics pirate in the Pirates of the Caribbean attraction.
- Directed by: Hamilton S. Luske
- Original air date: 1965

"Disneyland 10th Anniversary" is a 1965 episode of Walt Disney's Wonderful World of Color, broadcast on both January 3 and May 30.

The show begins with Walt Disney showing viewers and Disneyland ambassador Julie Reihm plans for upcoming attractions, including It's a Small World, Pirates of the Caribbean and the Haunted Mansion. In Disneyland, the Disney characters celebrate Disneyland's decennial, with a show in front of the Sleeping Beauty Castle and a parade put on by a local high school band and cheerleaders. Next, Walt Disney describes a brief history of the construction of the park, followed by a tour of some of the attractions at the time, including Matterhorn Bobsleds, Jungle Cruise, the Flying Saucers, the Mine Train Through Nature's Wonderland and the Walt Disney's Enchanted Tiki Room. The climax of the episode is a Dixieland band on the Mark Twain Riverboat, and some other boats on the Rivers of America put on an interesting water show.

== Home media ==
The short was released on December 4, 2001, on Walt Disney Treasures: Disneyland, USA and in 2006 on Walt Disney Treasures: Your Host, Walt Disney. In both of the DVD releases the Tiki Room show segment is significantly reduced in length.
