= The Bird Store =

1932 film by Wilfred Jackson

- Title card
- Directed by: Wilfred Jackson
- Produced by: Walt Disney
- Music by: Frank Churchill
- Color process: Black and white
- Production company: Walt Disney Productions
- Distributed by: Columbia Pictures
- Release date: January 16, 1932
- Running time: 7 minutes
- Country: United States
- Language: English

The Bird Store is a 1932 animated short film directed by Wilfred Jackson. It was released on January 16, 1932. It is the 26th film of the Silly Symphonies series and the final film to be released by Columbia Pictures, as Disney switched distributors to United Artists. The cartoon marks the first recorded voice work of Clarence Nash (the original voice of Donald Duck) for Disney.

== Plot ==
In a pet shop specializing in birds, various caged birds chirp along to the score in their various styles (including a set of birds that look like the Marx Brothers). A cat eyes the proceedings hungrily and makes his way in through an open transom, causing panic and an organized counterattack. The cat then becomes trapped in the cage; the birds throw him out and the cage lands on a flag pole in the middle of the city dog pound.

== Voice cast ==
- Purv Pullen, Clarence Nash, Marion Darlington: Bird warbles and whistling
- Clarence Nash: Cat
- Pinto Colvig and Clarence Nash: Dogs barking
- Walt Disney: Parrot
- Marcellite Garner: Lady on phone

== Reception ==
Motion Picture Herald called the film "very good".

== Home media ==
The short was released on December 19, 2006, on Walt Disney Treasures: More Silly Symphonies, Volume Two.
