= The Merry Dwarfs =

1929 film by Walt Disney

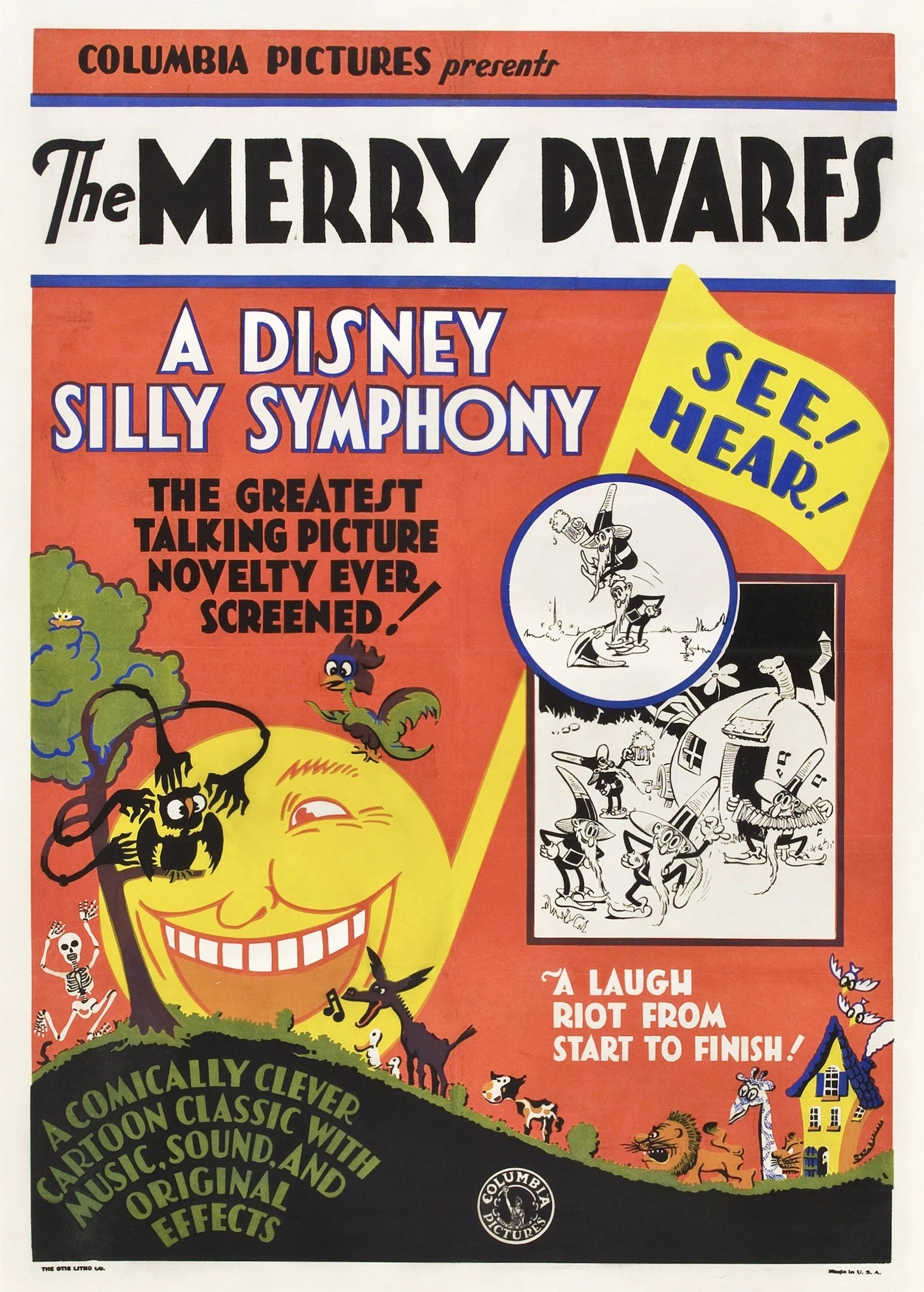
- Poster
- Directed by: Walt Disney
- Produced by: Walt Disney
- Music by: Carl W. Stalling
- Animation by: Ub Iwerks; Wilfred Jackson; Les Clark; Johnny Cannon; Jack Cutting
- Backgrounds by: Carlos Manriquez
- Production company: Disney Cartoons
- Distributed by: Columbia Pictures
- Release date: December 19, 1929
- Running time: 5:57
- Country: United States
- Language: English

The Merry Dwarfs is a 1929 American animated short film directed by Walt Disney. It is the fifth film in the Silly Symphonies series. The short's copyright was renewed in 1957, and as a published work from 1929 it entered the US public domain on January 1, 2025. (Note: While the notice in the renewal is listed as 1930, the notice on the physical short is 1929. The short entered the public domain based on the earlier notice.)

== Summary ==
The short

The residents of a dwarf village dance as they go about their business (sweeping the floor, etc.). Several dwarves make music. Some of them played the (shoe-covered) feet of arthropods (a centipede, a grasshopper) with hammers, while others played instruments such as saxophones or drums. Several groups of dwarves even dance with barrels (over which they jump) and beer glasses. The dancing continues once they have drunk their glasses of beer. The short film ends when a duo of dwarves, dancing on a flower, fall into a barrel of beer located under the flower. The dwarves come out of the barrel drunk and continue dancing in that state.

Music used in the film includes the Anvil Chorus from Giuseppe Verdi's 1853 opera Il trovatore.

== Reception ==
The Film Daily (December 15, 1929): "Snappy Cartoon: Here is one of the Silly Symphony series that will cop the glory from a number of features. Synchronized splendidly the picture portrays the merry dwarfs in a series of dancing steps which trickle along with peppy rhythm. Don't consider it filler even though its short for many are the laughs it will register with any type of audience anywhere. Truly entertainment for children from six to sixty."

Variety (December 25, 1929): "On the same lines of Skeleton Dance and Spring Fever. Not as good, but almost. Smart and amusing enough for any sound house just on the novelty and the relief from the stream of mediocre singing images the short makers, as a rule, have been presenting. Cartoon outfit is evidently feeling the pinch of finding new routines to fit these classical synchronizes scores, but a visit to any vaude or picture house playing stage shows should provide the desired material through the hoofers, acrobatic dancers and adagio teams. These animated drawings have yet to poke fun at the poop-de-oop singers, or 'elbow' routines of the hot dancing choruses which have become standardized by repetition. To delve into the modern era and its tunes might be a bet, unless royalty for use of melodies prevents. Nothing the matter with this Disney series which Columbia is releasing. Their reception invariably outstrips any two one-reelers of the vaude specie."

Motion Picture News (December 28, 1929): "Upholds Disney Standard: This Disney cartoon strays from the beaten path insofar as characters are concerned. It is the first of the series in which humans are introduced, depicting a rollicking band of gnomes filled with the spirit of music and dance. And how they dance! They twist and turn to the tunes of familiar melodies. A funny cartoon frolic."

== Home media ==
The short was released on December 19, 2006, on Walt Disney Treasures: More Silly Symphonies, Volume Two in the "From the Vault" section of the DVD, because the film includes many characters drinking beer.
