= Hell's Bells (film) =

1929 film by Ub Iwerks

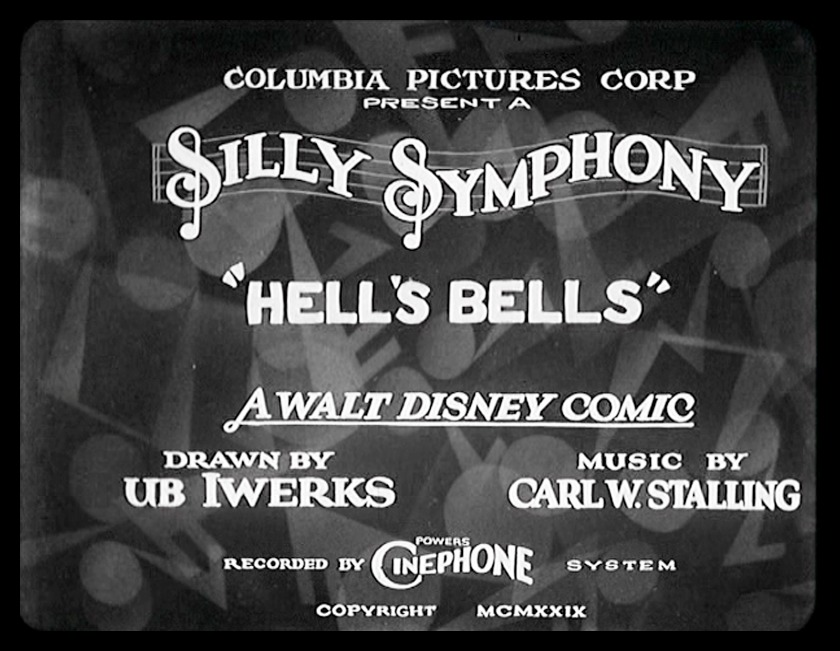
- The title card of Hell's Bells
- Directed by: Ub Iwerks
- Produced by: Walt Disney
- Music by: Carl W. Stalling
- Production company: Disney Cartoons
- Distributed by: Columbia Pictures
- Release date: October 30, 1929
- Running time: 5:50
- Country: United States
- Language: English

Hell's Bells is a 1929 comedy horror animated short film directed by Ub Iwerks and produced by Walt Disney. It is the fourth film in the Silly Symphonies series. The film follows Satan and the other devils' happenings in Hell. One of these devils revolts against Satan and ends up kicking him off the cliff of Hell.

The short's copyright was renewed in 1957. As a published work from 1929, it entered the U.S. public domain on January 1, 2025. (Note: While the notice in the renewal is listed as 1930, the notice on the physical short is 1929. The short will enter the public domain based on the earlier notice.)

== Plot ==
The short.

The film begins with fire consuming the screen and leaving behind Hell. Several bats fly around a cavern with a pit of fire in the center. A spider descends from a web above and swings backward and forward over the fire pit, swallowing the camera a couple of times as well. The spider does this until the fire grabs it and drags it down. Then an alligator snarls at the camera and crawls into the pit into which the spider disappeared. A three-headed dog then approaches and the heads snarl at the camera. After that, a bat flies over a large snake who tries to bite it. The bat defies the snake by blowing a raspberry, but this results in the snake eating the bat, after which the snake grows wings and flies away.

An orchestra plays music to entertain Satan. The orchestra is a mix of traditional instruments and nonsensical ones -- one of the creatures plays a saxophone, whilst another comically uses a stringed spine and pelvis in place of a cello. A demon then begins to dance to the music, occasionally flying to it as well. Then other demons begin to dance. After they finish their dancing and start walking away, one demon runs into the craggy, zig-zagged wall, and his body takes on a zig-zagged shape as a result. He dances some more to try to shake out his crooked body. When his body shape is back to normal, he runs into the wall again.

Satan laughs at the occurrence and then rings a bell to signal his desire to be fed. Upon hearing the bell, demon servants squeeze a cow-like creature for some milk that is as hot as fire and bring it to Satan. He finds the milk pleasing as he drinks it all in one gulp. Afterwards Satan picks up one of the two little demons and feeds him to the three-headed dog seen earlier. Satan laughs and proceeds to grab for the other little demon. Not wanting to meet a similar fate, the demon refuses by stepping away from Satan.

This angers Satan, who leaps from his throne and begins to chase the little demon through Hell. The chase leads them to the precipice of a cliff under which the little demon hides. While Satan stands at the edge looking for him, the little demon sneaks back up from behind and kicks Satan over the cliff. As Satan plummets, he manages to catch onto a ledge. This makes his body stretch out like an accordion, with the fire from below tugging at his tail and spanking him. The fire then grabs Satan and pulls him down, ultimately killing him. The film ends with the fire consuming the screen and leaving behind a 'The End' card.

== Reception ==
Hell's Bells received mixed reviews by cinema magazines at the time.

The Film Daily (November 17, 1929): "Ace Cartoon: Another of the Silly Symphony series, with the cartoon work outdoing previous efforts in its ingenuity. With Hades as the scene of action and a set of grotesque animals of all sizes as the performers, the reel is continuously amusing as well as fascinating. The graceful contortions and rhythmic gyrations of the dumb caricatures evoke both laughter and wonder".

Variety (November 20, 1929): "Moving cartoon picturing Hades as the weirdest of places with its inhabitants in odd animal forms. All comedy of the ghost-story type. Such as one musician using the backbone and hips of a human as his cello. Another instrument in this band is a pool of bubbling lava, one of the devils piercing the bubbles with his spiked tail to make music. While Satan drinks his white-hot milk direct from the udder of a dragon cow. Lot of laughs from the unnatural comedy effects a cartoonist can create and a peach filler".

The Film Daily (November 23, 1929): "Few Laughs: Hell's Bells is evidently a follow-up on the success of The Skeleton Dance, but it does not approach that offering in laugh possibilities. It is pretentious as cartoons go. Full of fire and brimstone with a sort of a Jack-and-the-Beanstalk finish that is the best thing in it".

== Home media ==
The short was released on December 19, 2006, on Walt Disney Treasures: More Silly Symphonies, Volume Two.

== See also ==
- The Skeleton Dance
- Red Hot Mamma
- Pluto's Judgement Day
- The Goddess of Spring, another Silly Symphony with a similar depiction of Hell and The Devil
