= The Pied Piper (1933 film) =

1933 film by Wilfred Jackson

- Title card
- Directed by: Wilfred Jackson
- Produced by: Walt Disney
- Starring: George Gramlich; Allan Watson; Marion Darlington
- Music by: Leigh Harline
- Color process: Technicolor
- Production company: Walt Disney Productions
- Distributed by: United Artists
- Release date: September 16, 1933
- Running time: 7 min
- Country: United States
- Language: English

The Pied Piper is a 1933 American animated short film directed by Wilfred Jackson. It is the 39th film of the Silly Symphonies series. It is based on the story of the Pied Piper of Hamelin. It was released on September 16, 1933.

== Plot ==
In the city of Hamelin, there is a large population of rats that keeps growing and eating all the food in sight. The mayor offers to pay a bag of gold to whoever can get rid of the rats. At that moment, the Pied Piper shows up and offers his services. By playing a tune on his pipe, he hypnotizes the rodents to follow him out of Hamelin. Then he creates a wheel of cheese with his pipe, tempting the rats to go in and eat it, and once all of the rats were in the holes of the cheese, he makes it vanish.

When he returns to the town, the mayor refuses to pay him the bag of gold because he just played a pipe, and gives him one coin, while the other adults laugh at him. Furious, the Pied Piper decides to get revenge and save the children from growing up to be like the adults by taking them away.

The mayor and adults dismiss him, since they locked the town gate after the rats left and no one can get out. However, the Piper not only charms the children into following him but enchants the town gate into ripping itself open and allowing the children to leave, and the Mayor is left in horror to face the wrath of the adults for the loss of their children. The Piper leads the children to the mountains and an enchanted land with fun and games, where they all live happily ever after.

== Home media ==
The short was released on December 19, 2006, on Walt Disney Treasures: More Silly Symphonies, Volume Two.

Additional releases include:

- Walt Disney Cartoon Classics Limited Gold Edition II: The Disney Dream Factory: 1933-1938 (VHS), 1985
- Walt Disney's Timeless Tales Volume 1: The Prince and the Pauper/Three Little Pigs/The Tortoise and the Hare (DVD), 2005
- Walt Disney Animation Collection: Classic Short Films Volume 3: The Prince and the Pauper (DVD), 2009
