= Silly Symphony =

American animated film series

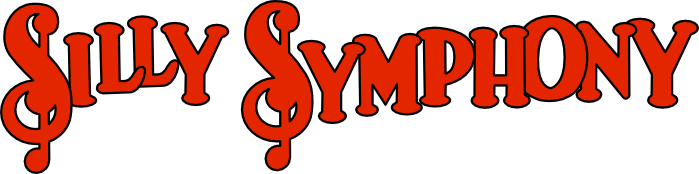
- Production company: Walt Disney Productions
- Distributed by: Columbia Pictures (1929–1932); United Artists (1932–1937); RKO Radio Pictures (1937–1939); Buena Vista Pictures Distribution (reissues)
- Country: United States
- Language: English

Silly Symphony (also known as Silly Symphonies) is an American animated series of 75 musical short films produced by Walt Disney Productions from 1929 to 1939. As the series name implies, the Silly Symphonies were originally intended as whimsical accompaniments to pieces of music. While the series followed an anthology format unlike Mickey Mouse shorts, the series introduced a series of recurring characters, including the protagonsits of Three Little Pigs, The Tortoise and the Hare, and Three Orphan Kittens, which all had sequels, in addition to Donald Duck and Pluto. The series is notable for its innovation with Technicolor and the multiplane motion picture camera, as well as its introduction of the character Donald Duck, who made his first appearance in the Silly Symphony cartoon The Wise Little Hen in 1934. Seven shorts won the Academy Award for Best Animated Short Film.

Many of the shorts were adapted into print mediums. Starting in 1932, a Silly Symphony newspaper comic strip was distributed by King Features Syndicate, as well as a Dell comic book series and numerous children's books.

The Silly Symphonies returned to theaters with its re-issues and re-releases, and tied with Joseph Barbera and William Hanna's Tom and Jerry's record for most Oscar wins for a cartoon series in the Academy Award for Best Animated Short Film category.

The first five Silly Symphony shorts entered the public domain on January 1, 2025 with another 10 on January 1, 2026. The same will happen to subsequent shorts from 1931, 1932, and 1933 in 2027, 2028, and 2029 respectively.

== Production ==
1935 series poster

While Walt Disney and Carl W. Stalling, a theatre organist from Kansas City, were in New York to add sound to the Mickey Mouse shorts The Gallopin' Gaucho, The Barn Dance and Plane Crazy, Stalling suggested the idea of making a series of musical animated shorts that combined the latest sound technology with storytelling. At first Walt did not seem interested, but when they returned to New York in February to record the sound for a fifth Mickey Mouse cartoon, The Opry House, they also recorded the soundtrack for The Skeleton Dance, the type of short that Stalling had suggested and the first Silly Symphony cartoon.

Within the animation industry, the series is known for its use by Walt Disney as a platform for experimenting with processes, techniques, characters, and stories in order to further the art of animation. What The Skeleton Dance and Silly Symphonies did differently than any other cartoons that had been made previously in regard of sound, was that the music and sounds were recorded before the actual animated segments, instead of the other way around. The series also provided a venue to try out techniques and technologies, such as Technicolor, special effects animation, and dramatic storytelling in animation, that would be crucial to Disney's plans to eventually begin making feature-length animated films.

Shortly after the switch to United Artists, the series became even more popular. Walt Disney had seen some of Dr. Herbert Kalmus' tests for a new three-strip, full-color Technicolor process, which would replace the previous two-tone Technicolor process. Disney signed a contract with Technicolor which gave the Disney studio exclusive rights to the new three-strip process through the end of 1935, and had a 60% complete Symphony, Flowers and Trees, scrapped and redone in full color. Flowers and Trees was the first animated film to use the three-strip Technicolor process, and was a phenomenal success. Within a year, the now-in-Technicolor Silly Symphonies series had popularity and success that matched (and later surpassed) that of the Mickey Mouse cartoons. The contract Disney had with Technicolor would also later be extended another five years as well.

The success of Silly Symphonies would be tremendously boosted after Three Little Pigs was released in 1933 and became a box office sensation; the film was featured in movie theaters for several months and also featured the hit song that became the anthem of the Great Depression, "Who's Afraid of the Big Bad Wolf". Several Silly Symphonies entries, including Three Little Pigs (1933), The Grasshopper and the Ants (1934), The Tortoise and the Hare (1935), The Country Cousin (1936), The Old Mill (1937), Moth and the Flame (1938), Wynken, Blynken, and Nod (1938), and The Ugly Duckling (1939, with an earlier black-and-white version from 1931), are among the most notable short films produced by Walt Disney.

Due to problems related to Disney's scheduled productions of cartoons, a deal was made with Hugh Harman and Rudolf Ising to produce three Silly Symphonies: Merbabies, Goldilocks and the Three Bears and The Little Goldfish. Only one of these cartoons, Merbabies, ended up being released under Disney. The remaining two Harman-Ising Silly Symphonies were then sold to Metro-Goldwyn-Mayer, who hired Harman and Ising after previously terminating their contract. Disney ceased production of Silly Symphonies in 1939.

== Distribution ==
The series was first distributed by Pat Powers from 1929 to 1930 and released by Celebrity Productions (1929–1930) indirectly through Columbia Pictures. The original basis of the cartoons was musical novelty, and the musical scores of the first cartoons were composed by Carl W. Stalling.

=== Columbia Pictures ===
After viewing The Skeleton Dance, the manager at Columbia Pictures quickly became interested in distributing the series, and gained the perfect opportunity to acquire Silly Symphonies after Disney broke with Celebrity Productions head Pat Powers after Powers signed Disney's colleague Ub Iwerks to a studio contract. Columbia Pictures (1930–1932) agreed to pick up the direct distribution of the Mickey Mouse series on the condition that they would have exclusive rights to distribute the Silly Symphonies series; at first, Silly Symphonies could not even come close to the popularity Mickey Mouse had. The original title cards to the shorts released by Celebrity Productions and Columbia Pictures were all redone after Walt Disney stopped distributing his cartoons through them.

=== United Artists ===
In 1932, after falling out with Columbia Pictures, Disney began distributing his products through United Artists. UA refused to distribute the Silly Symphonies unless Disney associated Mickey Mouse with them somehow, resulting in the "Mickey Mouse presents a Silly Symphony" title cards and posters that introduced and promoted the series during its five-year run for UA. United Artists also agreed to double the budget for each cartoon from $7,500 to $15,000. The first short released by United Artists was The Bears and Bees.

=== RKO Radio Pictures ===
In 1937, Disney signed a distribution deal with RKO Radio Pictures to distribute the Silly Symphony cartoons, along with the Mickey Mouse series. RKO would continue to distribute until the end of the series in 1939. Disney would produce occasional one-shot films true to the spirit of the series, but were not labeled as such.

=== Home media ===
Several Symphonies have been released in home media, most of the time as bonus shorts that relate to something within various Disney films. For instance, the original Dumbo VHS included Father Noah's Ark, The Practical Pig and Three Orphan Kittens as bonus shorts to make up for the film's short length. In the UK, several Silly Symphonies were released in compilations under Disney Videos' "Storybook Favourites" brand. The three "Storybook Favourites Shorts" volumes released included among others, The Three Little Pigs, The Tortoise and the Hare and the remake of The Ugly Duckling.

On December 4, 2001, Disney released "Silly Symphonies" as part of its DVD series "Walt Disney Treasures". On December 19, 2006, "More Silly Symphonies" was released, completing the collection and allowing the cartoons to be completely available to the public.

Some Disney Blu-ray discs include Silly Symphonies as high definition special features. Snow White and the Seven Dwarfs includes six, Beauty and the Beast and Dumbo both contain two and Pixar's A Bug's Life contains one.

The Silly Symphony shorts originally aired on Turner Classic Movies' period program block "Treasures from the Disney Vault".

Some Silly Symphony shorts are viewable on Disney+. A number of cartoons in the series have their intros modified by Disney for reissues, rendering the original film versions lost.

== Soundtracks ==
Owing to the cartoons' popularity, in 1935 Ambrose and His Orchestra released "A Selection from Walt Disney's Silly Symphonies" medley as the B-side of their "When Day Is Done" single.

2015 saw the release of "The Silly Symphony Collection, (is) a first-of-its-kind box set from Walt Disney Records and Fairfax Classics featuring the complete restored soundtracks from all 75 Silly Symphony shorts from 1929-1939, with more than 8 hours of music over 16 vinyl LPs." It was limited to 5,000 copies and the dedicated website included a nine-minute restoration featurette, and news of two live concert performances set to the original shorts. The following year, the music for The Skeleton Dance and Three Little Pigs was excerpted for a limited-edition 10" vinyl EP for Record Store Day.

== List of films ==
All films released in or before 1930 are in the public domain.

#	Film	Original release date	Director	Music	Notes
1	The Skeleton Dance	August 22, 1929	Walt Disney	Carl W. Stalling	First entry in the Silly Symphony series.; Only cartoon to have its soundtrack recorded in New York.
2	El Terrible Toreador	September 26, 1929	Walt Disney	Carl W. Stalling	The first Silly Symphony to have its soundtrack recorded in Los Angeles.
3	Springtime	October 24, 1929	Ub Iwerks	Carl W. Stalling	Scenes from this film appeared in the 1961 film One Hundred and One Dalmatians.
4	Hell's Bells	November 21, 1929	Ub Iwerks	Carl W. Stalling	
5	The Merry Dwarfs	December 19, 1929	Walt Disney	Carl W. Stalling	
6	Summer	January 16, 1930	Ub Iwerks	Carl W. Stalling	
7	Autumn	February 13, 1930	Ub Iwerks	Carl W. Stalling	The last Silly Symphony with involvement from Ub Iwerks and Carl Stalling.
8	Cannibal Capers	March 20, 1930	Burt Gillett	Bert Lewis	The version that aired on The Mickey Mouse Club was cut short at the end. The version that is on the "More Silly Symphonies" DVD includes the original ending along with the cut ending.
9	Frolicking Fish	May 8, 1930	Burt Gillett	Bert Lewis	Originally released with green tinting.
10	Arctic Antics	June 26, 1930	Burt Gillett	Bert Lewis	Planned to be directed by Ub Iwerks before he left the studio.
11	Night	July 31, 1930	Walt Disney	Bert Lewis	Originally released with blue tinting.
12	Midnight in a Toy Shop	August 16, 1930	Wilfred Jackson	Bert Lewis	
13	Monkey Melodies	September 26, 1930	Burt Gillett	Bert Lewis	
14	Winter	October 30, 1930	Burt Gillett	Bert Lewis	
15	Playful Pan	December 27, 1930	Burt Gillett	Bert Lewis	
16	Birds of a Feather	February 3, 1931	Burt Gillett	Bert Lewis	
17	Mother Goose Melodies	April 16, 1931	Burt Gillett	Bert Lewis; Frank Churchill	
18	The China Plate	May 23, 1931	Wilfred Jackson	Frank Churchill	
19	The Busy Beavers	June 30, 1931	Burt Gillett	Frank Churchill	
20	The Cat's Nightmare	July 28, 1931	Wilfred Jackson	Frank Churchill	The film's working title was The Cat's Out, and the current vault print features that title in its credits.
21	Egyptian Melodies	August 27, 1931	Wilfred Jackson	Frank Churchill	
22	The Clock Shop	September 28, 1931	Wilfred Jackson	Frank Churchill	The film's working title was The Clock Store, and the current vault print features that title in its credits.
23	The Spider and the Fly	October 23, 1931	Wilfred Jackson	Frank Churchill	
24	The Fox Hunt	November 20, 1931	Wilfred Jackson	Frank Churchill	
25	The Ugly Duckling	December 17, 1931	Wilfred Jackson	Bert Lewis; Frank Churchill	This short would be remade in Technicolor in 1939.
26	The Bird Store	January 16, 1932	Wilfred Jackson	Frank Churchill	The last Silly Symphony to be distributed by Columbia Pictures.
27	The Bears and Bees	July 9, 1932	Wilfred Jackson	Frank Churchill	The first Silly Symphony to be distributed by United Artists.
28	Flowers and Trees	July 30, 1932	Burt Gillett	Bert Lewis; Frank Churchill	Winner of the inaugural Academy Award for Best Animated Short Film.; The first film to be produced in three-strip Technicolor.
29	Just Dogs	August 12, 1932	Burt Gillett	Bert Lewis	The first appearance of Pluto without Mickey Mouse.
30	Bugs in Love	October 1, 1932	Burt Gillett	Bert Lewis	The last Silly Symphony to be produced in black-and-white.
31	King Neptune	October 15, 1932	Burt Gillett	Bert Lewis	
32	Babes in the Woods	November 19, 1932	Burt Gillett	Bert Lewis	The last Silly Symphony to be recorded with Cinephone.
33	Santa's Workshop	December 10, 1932	Wilfred Jackson	Frank Churchill	The first Silly Symphony to be recorded with RCA Photophone.
34	Birds in the Spring	March 13, 1933	David Hand	Bert Lewis; Frank Churchill	
35	Father Noah's Ark	April 8, 1933	Wilfred Jackson	Leigh Harline	
36	Three Little Pigs	May 25, 1933	Burt Gillett	Frank Churchill	Winner of the 1932–33 Academy Award for Best Animated Short Film.; From this film came the Disney studio's first hit song, "Who's Afraid of the Big Bad Wolf?".; The scene with the wolf impersonating a Jewish peddler is censored on various releases.
37	Old King Cole	July 29, 1933	David Hand	Frank Churchill; Bert Lewis	
38	Lullaby Land	August 19, 1933	Wilfred Jackson	Frank Churchill; Leigh Harline	
39	The Pied Piper	September 16, 1933	Wilfred Jackson	Leigh Harline	
40	The Night Before Christmas	December 9, 1933	Wilfred Jackson	Leigh Harline	
41	The China Shop	January 13, 1934	Wilfred Jackson	Leigh Harline	
42	Grasshopper and the Ants	February 10, 1934	Wilfred Jackson	Leigh Harline	Reissued by RKO Radio Pictures as The Grasshopper and the Ants.
43	Funny Little Bunnies	March 24, 1934	Wilfred Jackson	Frank Churchill; Leigh Harline	Reissued by RKO Radio Pictures.
44	The Big Bad Wolf	April 14, 1934	Burt Gillett	Frank Churchill	A sequel to Three Little Pigs.
45	The Wise Little Hen	May 3, 1934 (Carthay Circle Theatre); June 7, 1934	Wilfred Jackson	Leigh Harline	The debut appearance of Donald Duck.
46	The Flying Mouse	July 14, 1934	David Hand	Frank Churchill; Bert Lewis	
47	Peculiar Penguins	September 1, 1934	Wilfred Jackson	Leigh Harline	
48	The Goddess of Spring	November 3, 1934	Wilfred Jackson	Leigh Harline	
49	The Tortoise and the Hare	January 5, 1935	Wilfred Jackson	Frank Churchill	Winner of the 1933–34 Academy Award for Best Animated Short Film.
50	The Golden Touch	March 22, 1935	Walt Disney	Frank Churchill	The last film directed by Walt Disney.
51	The Robber Kitten	April 20, 1935	David Hand	Frank Churchill	Based on the book of the same name by Robert Michael Ballantyne.
52	Water Babies	May 11, 1935	Wilfred Jackson	Leigh Harline	
53	The Cookie Carnival	May 25, 1935	Ben Sharpsteen	Leigh Harline	This short is in the public domain due to an invalid copyright renewal.
54	Who Killed Cock Robin?	June 29, 1935	David Hand	Frank Churchill	Nominated for the 1935 Academy Award for Best Animated Short Film.; Named one of the ten best films of 1935 by the National Board of Review.; Scenes from this film appeared in the 1936 film Sabotage.
55	Music Land	October 5, 1935	Wilfred Jackson	Leigh Harline	
56	Three Orphan Kittens	October 26, 1935	David Hand	Frank Churchill	Winner of the 1935 Academy Award for Best Animated Short Film.
57	Cock o' the Walk	November 30, 1935	Ben Sharpsteen	Frank Churchill; Albert Hay Malotte	
58	Broken Toys	December 14, 1935	Ben Sharpsteen	Albert Hay Malotte	
59	Elmer Elephant	March 28, 1936	Wilferd Jackson	Leigh Harline	
60	Three Little Wolves	April 18, 1936	David Hand	Frank Churchill	
61	Toby Tortoise Returns	August 22, 1936	Wilfred Jackson	Leigh Harline	
62	Three Blind Mouseketeers	September 26, 1936	David Hand	Albert Hay Malotte	
63	The Country Cousin	October 31, 1936	David Hand; Wilfred Jackson	Leigh Harline	Winner of the 1936 Academy Award for Best Animated Short Film.
64	Mother Pluto	November 14, 1936	Wilfred Jackson	Leigh Harline	Originally designated part of the Mickey Mouse series, it was reclassified as a Silly Symphony just before release for unknown reasons.
65	More Kittens	December 19, 1936	David Hand	Frank Churchill	
66	Woodland Café	March 13, 1937	Wilfred Jackson	Leigh Harline	
67	Little Hiawatha	May 15, 1937	David Hand	Albert Hay Malotte	
68	Modern Inventions	May 29, 1937	Jack King	Oliver Wallace	Reissued as part of the Donald Duck series.; The last Silly Symphony to be distributed by United Artists.
69	The Old Mill	November 5, 1937	Wilfred Jackson	Leigh Harline	The first Silly Symphony to be distributed by RKO Radio Pictures.; Winner of the 1937 Academy Award for Best Animated Short Film.; First use of the multiplane camera.
70	Moth and the Flame	April 1, 1938	Burt Gillett; Dick Heumer	Leigh Harline	
71	Wynken, Blynken and Nod	May 27, 1938	Graham Heid	Leigh Harline	
72	Farmyard Symphony	October 14, 1938	Jack Cutting	Leigh Harline	
73	Merbabies	December 9, 1938	Rudolf Ising, Vernon Stallings	Scott Bradley	Animation was outsourced to Harman-Ising Productions, as part of an agreement that included the studio loaning some of its artists to Disney's to help complete Snow White and the Seven Dwarfs.
74	Mother Goose Goes Hollywood	December 23, 1938	Wilfred Jackson	Edward Plumb	Nominated for the 1938 Academy Award for Best Animated Short Film.; The most expensive Silly Symphony produced, its negative cost totaling $69,307.87.
75	The Ugly Duckling	April 7, 1939	Jack Cutting; Clyde Geronimi	Albert Hay Malotte	The last Silly Symphony to be distributed by RKO Radio Pictures.; Winner of the 1939 Academy Award for Best Animated Short Film.; Final entry in the Silly Symphony series, though some releases label it as a one-shot cartoon instead.

== Reception ==
Disney's experiments were widely praised within the film industry, and the Silly Symphonies won the Academy Award for Best Animated Short Film seven times, maintaining a six-year-hold on the category after it was first introduced. This record was matched only by MGM's Tom and Jerry series during the 1940s and 1950s.

== Legacy ==
The Symphonies changed the course of Disney studio history when Walt's plans to direct his first feature cartoon became problematic after his warm-up to the task The Golden Touch was widely seen (even by Disney himself) as stiff and slowly paced. This motivated him to embrace his role as being the producer and providing creative oversight (especially of the story) for Snow White while tasking David Hand to handle the actual directing.

Silly Symphonies brought along many imitators, including Warner Bros. cartoon series Looney Tunes and Merrie Melodies, MGM's Happy Harmonies, and later, Universal's Swing Symphony.

Years later after the Silly Symphonies ended, Disney occasionally produced a handful of one-shot cartoons, playing the same style as the Silly Symphony series. Unlike the Silly Symphonies canon, most of these "Specials" have a narration, usually by Disney legend Sterling Holloway.

The 1999–2000 television series Mickey Mouse Works used the Silly Symphonies title for some of its new cartoons, but unlike the original cartoons, these did feature continuing characters.

As of 2021, three of the Silly Symphony shorts (Three Little Pigs, The Old Mill, and Flowers and Trees), have been selected for preservation in the United States National Film Registry by the Library of Congress, for being "culturally, historically, or aesthetically significant".

== Comic adaptations ==
A Sunday Silly Symphony comic strip ran in newspapers from January 10, 1932, to July 12, 1942. The strip featured adaptations of some of the Silly Symphony cartoons, including Birds of a Feather, The Robber Kitten, Elmer Elephant, Farmyard Symphony and Little Hiawatha. This strip began with a two-year sequence about Bucky Bug, a character based on the bugs in Bugs in Love.

There was also an occasional Silly Symphonies comic book, with nine issues published by Dell Comics from September 1952 to February 1959. The first issue of this anthology comic featured adaptations of some Silly Symphony cartoons, including The Grasshopper and the Ants, Three Little Pigs, The Goddess of Spring and Mother Pluto, but it also included non-Symphony cartoons like Mickey Mouse's Brave Little Tailor. By the third issue, there was almost no Symphony-related material in the book; the stories and activities were mostly based on other Disney shorts and feature films.

== See also ==
- Golden age of American animation
- Silly Symphony Swings at California Adventure
- List of Disney animated shorts
- Silly Symphonies the newspaper comic strip, featuring adaptations of the animated shorts
- Merrie Melodies, from Warner Bros. Pictures
- Happy Harmonies, from Metro-Goldwyn-Mayer
- Color Classics, from Fleischer Studios
- Color Rhapsody, from Screen Gems
- The Practical Pig, a spin-off short film considered to be part of the series
