= Arctic Antics =

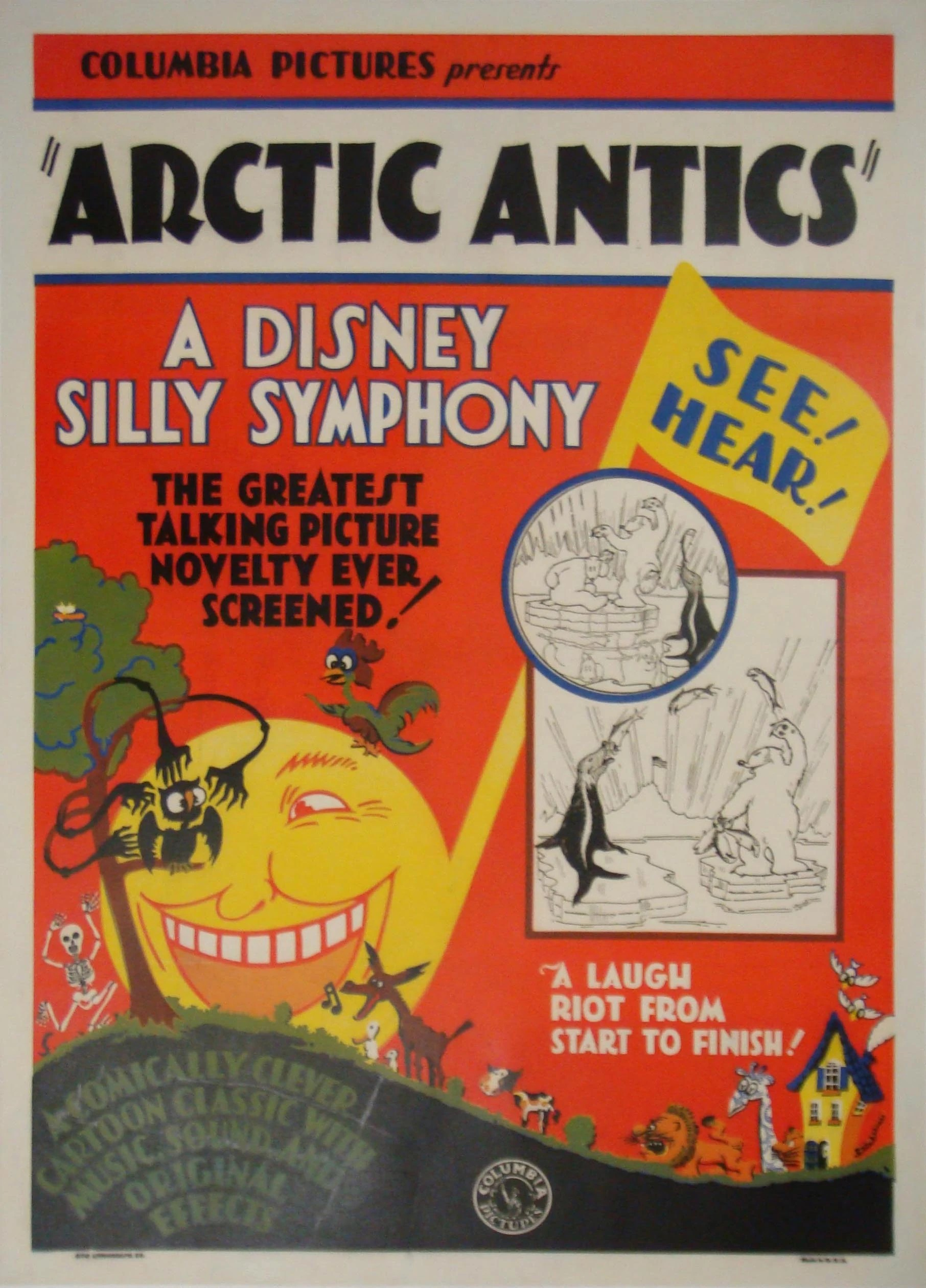
- Directed by: Burt Gillett; Ub Iwerks
- Produced by: Walt Disney
- Music by: Bert Lewis
- Animation by: Wilfred Jackson; Gilles de Trémaudan; David Hand; Les Clark; Norman Ferguson; Ben Sharpsteen; Dick Lundy; Johnny Cannon; Jack King
- Backgrounds by: Emil Flohri; Carlos Manríquez
- Production company: Walt Disney Productions
- Distributed by: Columbia Pictures
- Release date: June 26, 1930
- Running time: 7:00
- Country: United States
- Language: English

The short film

Arctic Antics is a Silly Symphonies animated Disney short film. It was released on June 26, 1930.

Ub Iwerks' name is on the draft, but Iwerks had left the Walt Disney Studio four months before the animators started producing the cartoon, Burt Gillett took over the Iwerks unit and finished the cartoon under his direction. The scenes of the singing walrus and the applauding seals are lifted directly from Wild Waves, a Mickey Mouse short directed by Gillett in late 1929.

== Plot ==
The title card shows. After that, it fades to a polar landscape, the camera cuts to a mother polar bear letting its cub play around, which then she kicks it off while the cub is surfing with a piece of ice. We then see some polar bears, seals and walruses dancing ang swimming. Cut back to that cub using its tail to motor an ice block. We then see the mother bear dancing (possibly twerking). The camera cuts to a walrus chasing a mischievous fish (maybe an arctic char) before the walrus lets out its anger when the fish escapes. Then, four seals are seen dancing until, they jump into the water. We then see even more seals back on land surrounding another seal seemingly playing with its food before eating it. Yet again, we see another seal using the before mentioned walrus as an instrument, before the walrus scares the seal away before singing. The walrus ends up winding himself but gets a fish (maybe THE fish) as a prize. The camera pans away towards some penguins, a gag of this section is that the tiny penguin cannot pay attention to the large penguin. After a bit of parading and stuff, the penguins whistle the ending and fade into darkness, as the short ends.

== Reception ==
The Film Daily (September 21, 1930): "Swell cartoon entertainment is this Walt Disney subject, one of the Silly Symphony series. Delightfully goofy stuff. Against an Arctic background, cartooned native animals go through the gestures of singing and dancing. The characters move in synchronism with the music. It is packed with laughs for everybody from six to sixty, and then some".

Variety (June 30, 1931): "As good as any in this series, which is pretty good. Drawing and synchronization carefully done with none of the hackneyed tricks which spoil so many cartoon shorts. Parade of penguins to the tune of "The Wooden Soldier" is a sure laugh anywhere with a dance by the seals not far behind".

== Home media ==
The short was released on December 19, 2006, on Walt Disney Treasures: More Silly Symphonies, Volume Two.
