= El Terrible Toreador =

1929 film by Walt Disney

- Title card
- Directed by: Walt Disney
- Produced by: Walt Disney
- Music by: Carl W. Stalling
- Animation by: Ub Iwerks; Burt Gillett; Wilfred Jackson; Les Clark; Jack King; Ben Sharpsteen
- Layouts by: Ub Iwerks
- Backgrounds by: Ub Iwerks
- Production company: Disney Cartoons
- Distributed by: Columbia Pictures
- Release date: September 26, 1929
- Running time: 6:14
- Country: United States
- Language: English

El Terrible Toreador is a 1929 animated short film directed by Walt Disney. It is the second installment in the Silly Symphonies series. The short's copyright was renewed in 1957, so it entered the US public domain on January 1, 2025. (Note: While the notice in the renewal is listed as 1930, the notice on the physical short is 1929. The short will enter the public domain based on the earlier notice.)

== Plot ==
The short

The film opens somewhere in Spain. A lady is carrying a mug of beer above her head, walking rhythmically to the music of "Carmen". She walks over to a man in a white suit. The man gives her a coin, and she modestly puts it in her shirt. Then the lady does a quick dance in front of the man in the suit. The man tips her, and the money falls into a container on the floor. The lady just ignores him. Outside the building, a toreador is standing. When he sees the lady, with the man in the suit, he is fuming mad. The man in the suit grabs the lady, and soon the two fight over her. This ends with the lady walking away. Then another scene opens with a bullfighting ring and the bull (strangely reminiscent of Clarabelle Cow) and the toreador walk into there. Followed by a few gags and music performances, the toreador finishes up the scene by pulling out the bull's insides.

== Reception ==
Motion Picture News (November 9, 1929): "O.K. For Laughs. This is a cartoon burlesque of Carmen in tabloid form. The music of the opera is used for the accompaniment. Filled with laughs, the bull wrestling and throwing which is the final touch is sure to get over. Go to it on this one."

The Film Daily (December 29, 1929): "This latest number in the Silly Symphony cartoon series is almost a continuous riot from start to finish. It has a Mexican locale, mostly in the bull ring, where the toreador, instead of setting in to kill his animal, does a "you chase me and I'll chase you" with the playful creature. A filler that can't miss."

== Home media ==
The short was released on December 19, 2006 on Walt Disney Treasures: More Silly Symphonies, Volume Two in the "From the Vault" section, because of the relatively graphic scene of the bull being pulled inside out.
