= Birds in the Spring =

1933 film by David Hand

- Title card
- Directed by: David Hand
- Produced by: Walt Disney
- Music by: Frank Churchill
- Color process: Technicolor
- Production company: Walt Disney Productions
- Distributed by: United Artists
- Release date: March 11, 1933
- Running time: 7 min
- Country: United States
- Language: English

Birds in the Spring is a 1933 American animated short film directed by David Hand. It is the 34th film of the Silly Symphonies series.

== Plot ==
Various birds are seen building nests and caring for eggs. One pair anxiously awaits the hatching of three eggs, then joyfully summons all the other birds to see their new hatchlings. Time jumps forward to when the hatchlings are fully fledged, learning to sing and fly. One becomes lost and explores the ground, encountering grasshoppers, hummingbirds and then a rattlesnake that attempts to eat the baby bird. The bird manages to lead the snake into tying itself into a knot, but the chick takes shelter in a hornet's nest. The parents rescue it from the angry hornets, and the film ends with the father bird spanking the chick.

== Production ==
The story outline for this film started in 1931, but was shelved until much later. Finally around October of 1932, the film was unshelved and the story started development with a working title of "Birds and Bees" (not to be confused with The Bears and the Bees) and with the production number of US #8. In this Silly Symphony, the studio wanted to animate and caricature how a bird moves and socializes with other birds, which became one of the first Silly Symphonies for this kind of experimentation with more realistic and convincing movement. Many pieces of classical music to stage a calm and springy day include excerpts from Archibald Joyce's "Dreaming", Clare Kummer's "The Bluebird", Eric Meyer-Helmund's "Dance", and Emmerich Kalmar's "Sari Waltz". Animation started on December 15, 1932, and lasted all the way until January 30, 1933. The voices of the birds only included two people, which were Marion Darlington and Purv Pullen.

== Releases ==
The film was released on March 11, 1933, and a few days later had a New York opening at Radio City Music Hall, becoming one of the first Disney shorts to be premiering there, all other Silly Symphonies were screened instead at Radio City before this short. One month later, it had an opening in Los Angeles from 19-25 of April of the same year at Fox Wilshire, with the popular film during its time Rasputin and the Empress.

== Reception ==
On March 21, 1933, The Film Daily said: "One of the niftiest little numbers of its kind to come along. Workmanship is the height of color cartoon art, and the idea in back of the action is both clever and highly amusing. It shows birds nesting in the spring, with the mother eventually hatching a trio of youngsters, who are then taught to sing, fly, etc. For kids or grownups, it's a pip."

== Voice cast ==
- Purv Pullen, Clarence Nash, Marion Darlington: Birds
- Dorothy Compton: Baby Birds
- Clarence Nash: Bees

== Home media ==
The short was released on December 19, 2006, on Walt Disney Treasures: More Silly Symphonies, Volume Two. Prior to that, the featurette also appeared on the Walt Disney Cartoon Classics Limited Gold Edition: Silly Symphonies VHS in the 1980s.
