= Broken Toys (1935 film) =

- Directed by: Ben Sharpsteen
- Story by: Pinto Colvig; Otto Englander; Larry Morey
- Produced by: Walt Disney
- Starring: Tommy Bupp; Leone LeDoux; Martha Wentworth; Leo Cleary; The Rhythmettes; Scott Whitaker; Frank Nelson; Ted Osborne; Cliff Clark; Shirley Reed; Mandy Peters; Bud Duncan
- Music by: Albert Hay Malotte
- Animation by: Dick Huemer; Art Babbitt; Bill Tytla; John McManus; Leonard Sebring; Johnny Cannon; Bob Wickersham; Wolfgang Reitherman; Marvin Woodward; George Drake; James Algar; Grim Natwick; Cy Young
- Color process: Technicolor
- Production company: Walt Disney Productions
- Distributed by: United Artists
- Release date: December 14, 1935
- Running time: 8 minutes
- Country: United States
- Language: English

Broken Toys is an 8-minute long, 1935 animated short film produced by Walt Disney in the Silly Symphonies series. The toys in the story include caricatures of W.C. Fields, Zasu Pitts, Ned Sparks and Stepin Fetchit. Broken Toys was originally scheduled to follow Elmer Elephant and Three Little Wolves but was moved ahead of these titles in order to have it ready for a Christmas release.

== Plot ==
In the pile of overused and broken toys, a discarded sailor doll gives the other toys, including an Aunt Jemima and Stepin Fetchit doll, a plan on how they can be repaired and bring happiness to others during Christmas.

== Voice cast ==
- Boy doll: Tommy Bupp
- Girl doll: Leone LeDoux
- W.C. Fields: Scott Whitaker
- ZaSu Pitts, Mae West: Martha Wentworth
- Cop: Bud Duncan
- Misc. voices: The Rhythmettes, Leo Cleary, Frank Nelson, Ted Osborne, Cliff Clark, Shirley Reed, Mandy Peters

== Home media ==
The short was released on December 19, 2006, on Walt Disney Treasures: More Silly Symphonies, Volume Two in the "From the Vault" section.

== See also ==
- List of Christmas films
