= More Kittens =

- Directed by: David Hand; Wilfred Jackson
- Produced by: Walt Disney
- Music by: Frank Churchill
- Animation by: Frenchy DeTremaudan; Leonard Sebring; Robert Stokes; Frank Thomas; Fred Moore; Bob Wickersham; Ollie Johnston; Ward Kimball
- Color process: Technicolor
- Production company: Walt Disney Productions
- Distributed by: United Artists
- Release date: December 19, 1936
- Running time: 8:10
- Country: United States
- Language: English

More Kittens is a Silly Symphonies animated Disney short film. It was released in 1936 and is the sequel to Three Orphan Kittens.

== Plot ==
The housekeeper sends the Three Orphan Kittens straight outside into the garden for causing trouble. They come across a St. Bernard, Bolivar and they get friendly with him while he tries to relax in peace. Later the kittens continue to explore the garden, running into a tortoise and the black kitten being pestered by a bluebird, causing the washing clothesline to loosen and leading to the kittens knocking over the wash tub and spreading water all over the garden front. The housekeeper angrily chases the kittens who take cover under Bolivar. She briefly comments about Bolivar's laziness and moves on, then the kittens emerge and lovingly nuzzle Bolivar.

== Production ==
This short was made after the prequel Three Orphan Kittens turned out to be a successful story and film, so a sequel was made after. Although at the time, Walt Disney's personal opinion on sequels weren't that keen, saying that creating new stories and films were better than just creating another film with the same situation and characters. This led to the film lacking much of the entertainment and originality that other Disney cartoons had at the time. Story development on the short started on February 21 of 1936 and ended just 2 months later, which was extremely short at the time compared to the usual 6–12 months of other Disney shorts. It originally had the production number of US #38, but as Mother Pluto was finishing its production, it started becoming viewed more as a Silly Symphony and not a Mickey Mouse short. More Kittens' production number was moved to US #39. A St. Bernard dog from Alpine Climbers also developed by Joe Grant was chosen to also appear in this cartoon, but with another name, replacing the name of Bolivar with Toliver in this short. Two of Disney's Nine Old Men also participated in animation of this short during their early years, which were Frank Thomas and Ward Kimball, both animating the start of the short.

== Reception ==
Motion Picture Herald (Jan 9, 1937): "The antics of three playful kittens imbued with infectious gaiety serve to number this as one of the best of Walt Disney's animated Silly Symphonies. In the characteristic feline manner, scaled down to fit their size, the three kittens cavort from prank to prank, much to the conservation [sic] of a Negro servant. An indigent member of the canine family, though much abused by the kittens, in the time of stress becomes their benefactor."

Boxoffice (Jan 30, 1937): "Continuing the amazing adventures of the three little kittens who were introduced to picture fans in an earlier Silly Symphony, the cartoon is again quaintly laughable throughout although lacking somewhat in the originality and sparkle of the other recent Disney subjects... Worthy of a spot on any bill."

== Voice cast ==
- Maid: Lillian Randolph
- Meows: Elvia Allman
- Birds: Clarence Nash

== Home media ==
The short was released on December 19, 2006, on Walt Disney Treasures: More Silly Symphonies, Volume Two.
