= The Fox Hunt (1931 film) =

1931 film by Wilfred Jackson

- Title card
- Directed by: Wilfred Jackson
- Produced by: Walt Disney
- Music by: Frank Churchill
- Color process: Black and white
- Production company: Walt Disney Productions
- Distributed by: Columbia Pictures
- Release date: October 21, 1931
- Running time: 6 min
- Country: United States
- Language: English

The Fox Hunt is a 1931 American animated short film directed by Wilfred Jackson. It is the 24th film of the Silly Symphonies series.

== Plot ==
It's morning in the English countryside and time for the gentry to participate in the fox hunt.

== Voice cast ==
- Horse: Richard Edwards

== Home media ==
The short was released on December 19, 2006, on Walt Disney Treasures: More Silly Symphonies, Volume Two.
