= The Bears and Bees =

1932 film by Wilfred Jackson

- Directed by: Wilfred Jackson
- Produced by: Walt Disney
- Starring: Pinto Colvig
- Music by: Frank Churchill
- Color process: Black and white
- Production company: Walt Disney Productions
- Distributed by: United Artists
- Release date: July 9, 1932
- Running time: 6 minutes
- Country: United States
- Language: English

The Bears and Bees is a 1932 animated short film directed by Wilfred Jackson. It was released on July 9, 1932. It is the 27th film of the Silly Symphonies series and the first film to be released by United Artists instead of Columbia Pictures.

== Plot ==
Two bear cubs tussle harmlessly, then start to munch on a berry bush, until a bigger, meaner bear chases them off. They nibble on some flowers and find a bee, which they follow to the hive, which they then proceed to raid. The big bear chases them off, but unknown to him, a bee spots the raid and summons the attack squad. The bees run him off, and the cubs dig in.

== Home media ==
The short was released on December 19, 2006, on Walt Disney Treasures: More Silly Symphonies, Volume Two.

== Legacy ==
As Cubby and Tubby, the two lead cubs made a singular appearance in a 1945 Li'l Bad Wolf comic book story, then received an ongoing comic strip of their own in British Disney comics of the early 1950s.
