= Cock o' the Walk (1935 film) =

- Directed by: Ben Sharpsteen
- Produced by: Walt Disney
- Music by: Frank Churchill
- Color process: Technicolor
- Production company: Walt Disney Productions
- Distributed by: United Artists
- Release date: November 30, 1935
- Country: United States
- Language: English

Cock o' the Walk is a Silly Symphonies animated Disney short film. It was released in 1935.

== Plot ==
The titular Cock comes home, a boxing champion laden with golden trophies, and the birds of the fowl run to greet him with a Busby Berkley-esque display. A pretty young Hen is being courted by a young Rooster who gives a crow after a kiss, but her head is turned by the strong, charismatic and confident Cock. They go into a dance with each other, that gets some other types of bird involved into dancing too. The Rooster, furious at his love interest getting taken, challenges the Cock to a fight, and is being soundly beaten until the Hen discovers a photograph of the Cock with a plump hen and multiple chicks, on which is written 'To our Daddy'. She then shoves the paper and slaps the Cock's face for being a cheater, then rushes over to the beaten Rooster. Trying to revive him, she kisses the Rooster, who is so exhilarated by the experience that he gives a mighty crow and roar and beats the Cock without effort, making the Cock land on one of his trophies unconscious. The Rooster and the Hen reconcile with a dance, then after another passionate kiss, the rooster gives another crow.

== Home media ==
The short was released on December 19, 2006, on Walt Disney Treasures: More Silly Symphonies, Volume Two.
