= Who Killed Cock Robin? (1935 film) =

- Directed by: David Hand
- Story by: William Cottrell; Joe Grant; Bob Kuwahara
- Produced by: Walt Disney
- Starring: Martha Wentworth; Billy Bletcher; Leo Cleary; Don Brodie; Nick Stewart; Charlie Lung; Purv Pullen; Bill Roberts; Gary Mix; Jack Dale; Lou Debney; John Reed
- Music by: Frank Churchill
- Color process: Technicolor
- Production company: Walt Disney Productions
- Distributed by: United Artists
- Release date: June 26, 1935
- Running time: 8 minutes
- Language: English

Who Killed Cock Robin is a Silly Symphonies animated short film released on June 26, 1935, by United Artists, produced by Walt Disney and directed by David Hand. It is based on the nursery rhyme Who Killed Cock Robin?. It was nominated for the Best Short Subject (Cartoons) Oscar but lost to Disney's own Three Orphan Kittens.

An extract from the cartoon was featured the following year in Alfred Hitchcock's Sabotage; the film's opening credits thank Disney for giving permission.

== Plot ==
While Cock Robin is serenading Jenny Wren, an unseen archer shoots an arrow into Cock Robin's heart. Then he falls to the ground, giving the other birds in the tree an impression that he has been shot and killed. The police arrive at the scene and apprehend a cuckoo, a sparrow, and a blackbird as suspects.

The next day, a trial is held over the identity of Cock Robin's murderer, with an owl serving as the judge and a parrot serving as the prosecutor. They interrogate the suspects and show Cock Robin's body as evidence. The blackbird protests his innocence, saying that he hasn't done, seen, or known anything about it. The sparrow refuses to say anything. The cuckoo doesn't know either, but he continuously points to the judge, the prosecutor, and even himself, showing that he is indeed "cuckoo". Everybody is ashamed, because nobody knows who killed Cock Robin.

At that moment, Jenny Wren arrives and demands that she see justice be done for Cock Robin. Eventually, the judge declares that all three suspects shall be hanged, because he doesn't know which one of them is guilty. Suddenly, another arrow strikes the judge's hat, and its owner is revealed to be Cupid. Cupid explains that although he shot Cock Robin, Robin isn't dead after all. He just simply fell for Jenny Wren and was currently unconscious from landing on his head, because the arrow that he was shot with was in his armpit. Jenny Wren revives Cock Robin, and they both kiss to the excitement of the jury.

== Voice cast ==
- Jenny: Martha Wentworth
- Judge: Billy Bletcher
- Irish cop: Leo Cleary
- D.A. parrot: Don Brodie
- Blackbird: Nick Stewart
- Dan Cupid: Charlie Lung
- Whistling: Purv Pullen
- Cock Robin: Bill Roberts
- Misc. voices: Gary Mix, Jack Dale, Lou Debney, John Reed

== Legacy ==
A sequence from this cartoon is featured in Alfred Hitchcock's 1936 film Sabotage.

== Home media ==
The short was released on December 4, 2001, on Walt Disney Treasures: Silly Symphonies - The Historic Musical Animated Classics, as an Easter egg found in the "Favorite Characters" section.
