= The Cat's Nightmare =

1931 film by Wilfred Jackson

- Title card
- Directed by: Wilfred Jackson
- Produced by: Walt Disney
- Music by: Frank Churchill
- Color process: Black and white
- Production company: Walt Disney Productions
- Distributed by: Columbia Pictures
- Release date: July 28, 1931
- Running time: 7 min
- Country: United States
- Language: English

The Cat's Nightmare is a 1931 American animated short film directed by Wilfred Jackson. It is the twentieth film in the Silly Symphonies series. Due to Columbia Pictures' poor preservation of old films, the only surviving print is an existing vault print retained by Disney titled The Cat's Out.

== Plot ==
The cartoon takes place at night near a dainty-looking cottage. The family cat is let out for the night and encounters much hardship (a boot gets thrown onto his head while he is on the fencepost). He catches a bird singing atop the weathervane of the roof, but it flies off, pulling the cat and weathervane from the roof and knocking the cat out. The cat then has a vision of giant birds bullying him and from then on everything seems to come to life and torment him, including a bunch of owls, a living water pump and dancing scarecrow, a swarm of bats, six giant spiders, two living trees and another giant bird. The whole thing turns out to be a nightmare, the cat is delighted and decides to go back into the cottage and is thrown out again. He sticks his tongue out at the welcome mat and marches away, this leads the cartoon to an end.

== Reception ==
Motion Picture Herald (October 3, 1931): "A clever piece of cartoon work, typical Silly Symphony number. The theme is as the title suggests, and animators have taken full advantage of its laugh-making possibilities."

Variety (October 27, 1931): "One of Walt Disney's Silly Symphony series and a beaut. Score is good and penmanship snappy, plus having some new ideas. Couple of good laughs help."

== Home media ==
The short was released on December 19, 2006, on Walt Disney Treasures: More Silly Symphonies, Volume Two.
