= Walt Disney Treasures: Wave Six =

Digital video disc collection

The sixth wave of Walt Disney Treasures was released on December 19, 2006. It contains four separate DVD sets. 65,000 sets were produced.

== More Silly Symphonies, Volume Two ==

This set contains all Silly Symphonies not released on the first volume in Wave One. Leonard Maltin mentions in the intro that the original title cards to most of these shorts are presumably lost, and therefore, new title cards had been recreated making a close approximation of how they originally looked. However, these title cards weren't used on the initial pressings of this set. Also, the cartoon The Night Before Christmas was an edited version, missing footage of toys resembling Amos 'n' Andy. Replacement discs were initially issued which corrected the errors on the original copies. From the Disney website, customers can call an 800 number to request replacement copies. Unlike the first volume, this was never released in a Region 2 format (except in Japan, which uses the NTSC video system).

=== Disc one ===
==== Shorts ====
- Hell's Bells (1929)
- Springtime (1929)
- Arctic Antics (1930)
- Autumn (1930)
- Frolicking Fish (1930)
- Monkey Melodies (1930)
- Night (1930)
- Playful Pan (1930)
- Summer (1930)
- Winter (1930)
- The Cat's Out (1931)
- The Clock Store (1931)
- The Fox Hunt (1931)
- The Spider and the Fly (1931)
- The Bears and the Bees (1932)
- The Bird Store (1932)
- Bugs in Love (1932)

==== From the vault ====
- El Terrible Toreador (1929)
- The Merry Dwarfs (1929)
- Cannibal Capers* (1930)
- Midnight in a Toy Shop (1930)

(*) = with optional original ending

==== Bonus features ====
- Various audio commentaries by noted historians

=== Disc two ===
==== Shorts ====
- Birds in the Spring (1933)
- The Night Before Christmas* (1933)
- Old King Cole (1933)
- The Pied Piper (1933)
- The Goddess of Spring (1934)
- Cock o' the Walk (1935)
- Three Blind Mouseketeers (1936)
- Little Hiawatha (1937)
- Merbabies (1938)
- Moth and the Flame (1938)

(*) = when the DVDs were reissued, "The Night Before Christmas" was moved to "From the Vault" section on the set.

==== From the vault ====
- King Neptune (1932)
- Santa's Workshop (1932)
- The China Shop (1934)
- Broken Toys (1935)
- Three Orphan Kittens (1935)
- More Kittens (1936)
- Mother Goose Goes Hollywood (1938)

==== Bonus features ====
- Silly Symphonies Rediscovered featurette
- Animators at Play Rare film of a studio softball game from 1930, narrated by Leonard Maltin
- Galleries
- Various audio commentaries by noted historians
- Easter egg: French language track on Little Hiawatha

== The Complete Pluto, Volume Two ==

This second volume of Pluto cartoons completes the collection started in Walt Disney Treasures: Wave Four, it also includes three cartoon shorts starring Figaro from the feature film, Pinocchio and Minnie Mouse appears in two of them. This was never released in region 2 (except in Japan).

=== Disc one ===
==== Shorts ====
- Rescue Dog (1947)
- Mail Dog (1947)
- Pluto's Blue Note (1947)
- Bone Bandit (1948)
- Pluto's Fledgling (1948)
- Pluto's Purchase (1948)
- Bubble Bee (1949)
- Pluto's Surprise Package (1949)
- Pluto's Sweater (1949)
- Pueblo Pluto (1949)
- Sheep Dog (1949)

==== Bonus features ====
- Master class: Animator Randy Cartwright discusses "Bone Trouble"
- Master class: Animator Andreas Deja discusses "Hawaiian Holiday"
- Pluto's process: A deconstruction of Pluto's Judgement Day
- Pluto's process: Pencil test reel for Pluto's Judgement Day

=== Disc two ===
==== Shorts ====
- Camp Dog (1950)
- Food for Feudin' (1950)
- Pests of the West (1950)
- Pluto and the Gopher (1950)
- Pluto's Heart Throb (1950)
- Primitive Pluto (1950)
- Puss Cafe (1950)
- Wonder Dog (1950)
- Cold Storage (1951)

==== From the vault ====
- Figaro and Cleo (1943)
- Cat Nap Pluto (1948)
- Cold Turkey (1951)
- Plutopia (1951)

==== Bonus features ====
- Bath Day (1946)
- Figaro and Frankie (1947)
- Gallery: Pluto backgrounds
- Gallery: Pluto in progress
- Gallery: Pluto published

== The Hardy Boys: The Mystery of the Applegate Treasure ==

This volume features the first of the two Hardy Boys serials that were shown on the Mickey Mouse Club.

In the late 1950s, Disney contracted with the Stratemeyer Syndicate and Grosset & Dunlap to produce two Hardy Boys TV serials, starring Tim Considine and Tommy Kirk.

The first of the serials, The Mystery of the Applegate Treasure, was aired on The Mickey Mouse Club in 1956 during the show's second season. To appeal to the show's audience, the Hardy Boys were portrayed as younger than in the books, seeming to be 11 or 12 years old. The script, written by Jackson Gillis, was based on the first Hardy Boys book, The Tower Treasure, and the serial was aired in 19 episodes of 15 minutes each with production costs of $5,700.

The main characters are Tim Considine as Frank Hardy and Tommy Kirk as Joe Hardy.

The second serial, The Mystery of Ghost Farm, followed in 1957, with an original story by Jackson Gillis. It has not been released as a Walt Disney Treasures set.

=== Disc 1 ===
==== Introduction ====
- The Mickey Mouse Club Episode 101: The Mystery of the Applegate Treasure - An Introduction (Originally Aired: October 1, 1956)

==== Episodes ====
- The Stranger (October 2, 1956)
- A Real Case (October 3, 1956)
- The First Clue (October 4, 1956)
- The Fugitive (October 5, 1956)
- Applegate's Gold (October 8, 1956)
- Dig for Treasure (October 9, 1956)
- A Pirate's Chest (October 10, 1956)
- Boys in Trouble (October 11, 1956)
- The Female Detective (October 12, 1956)

==== Bonus feature ====
- From Dixon to Disney featurette

=== Disc 2 ===
==== Episodes ====
- Iola's Bravery (October 15, 1956)
- Footsteps in the Tower (October 16, 1956)
- The Prisoner Speaks (October 17, 1956)
- A Strange Confession (October 18, 1956)
- A Golden Clue (October 19, 1956)
- The Final Search (October 22, 1956)
- The Tower's Secret (October 23, 1956)
- Never Say Die (October 24, 1956)
- Boys in Danger (October 25, 1956)
- The Tower Treasure (October 26, 1956)

==== Bonus feature ====
- The Hardy Boys Unmasked featurette and Production galleries

== Your Host, Walt Disney ==

This volume features four original, uncut broadcast episodes from the Disneyland television series (one of which is repeated from "Disneyland USA" released in Walt Disney Treasures: Wave One), as well as other television specials produced in a similar fashion and the host is Walt Disney.

=== Disc one ===
==== Episodes ====
- "Where Do the Stories Come From?" (1956)
- "The Fourth Anniversary Show" (1957)
- "Kodak Presents Disneyland '59" (1959)

==== Bonus features ====
- "My Dad, Walt Disney": Interview with Diane Disney-Miller, Walt's daughter
- Photo galleries
- Easter egg: A portion of the "Fourth Anniversary Show" shown in color. To access, go to "Program Selection", then select "Where do the Stories Come From?" Move the cursor to the right to highlight an arrow on the other side of the title and press enter.

=== Disc two ===
==== Episodes ====
- "Backstage Party" (1961)
- "Disneyland 10th Anniversary" (1965)

==== Bonus features ====
- "I Captured the King of the Leprechauns" (1959)
- Disneyland USA at Radio City Music Hall: Live introduction to a showing of "Disneyland, USA" featuring an in-person Mickey Mouse interacting with Walt on screen
- Working with Walt: Memories from actors and actresses who were children during their time working at the Disney studio
