= Three Blind Mouseketeers =

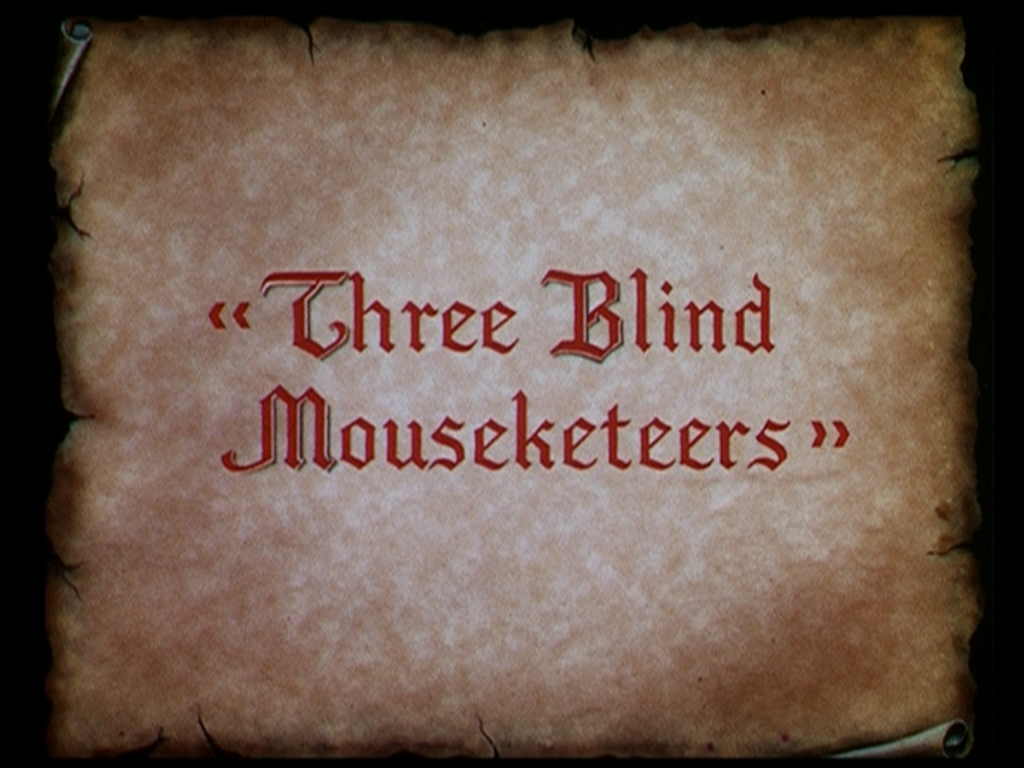
- Directed by: Dave Hand; Jack Cutting
- Written by: Webb Smith; Merrill De Maris; Otto Englander
- Produced by: Walt Disney
- Starring: Billy Bletcher; (Captain Katt)
- Music by: Albert Hay Malotte
- Production company: Walt Disney Productions
- Distributed by: United Artists
- Release date: September 26, 1936
- Running time: 8 minutes
- Country: United States
- Language: English

Three Blind Mouseketeers is a Silly Symphonies animated short film based on the nursery rhyme Three Blind Mice and the 1844 novel The Three Musketeers by Alexandre Dumas. Directed by Dave Hand and Jack Cutting, it stars Billy Bletcher.

== Plot ==
The three blind mice are disguised as musketeers in a cellar. Captain Cat (the devious cat) sets a number of traps for the mice and goes to sleep. The mice come out to search for food, avoiding all the traps. When they uncork three bottles of wine, the corks hit Captain Cat on the nose. Captain Cat wakes up and starts chasing the mice, only ending up trapping one mouse, who starts asking for help from the other two mice reflecting on numerous bottles. Captain Cat thinks he is surrounded by mice and runs away, falling into a multitude of traps that he has prepared himself.

== Voice cast ==
- Tall Mouseketeer: Pinto Colvig
- Captain Katt: Billy Bletcher
- Other two Mouseketeers: Walt Disney and Roy O. Disney

== Syndication ==
The cartoon was aired on Good Morning, Mickey! on the Disney Channel.

== Home media ==
The short has been released on home media several times. The first time was on a VHS release in 1985 on Walt Disney Cartoon Classics Limited Gold Edition II: The Disney Dream Factory: 1933-1938, then in the UK on VHS on Storybook Favourites Shorts: Three Little Pigs.

Its first DVD release was in 2003 on The Rescuers, followed on December 19, 2006, on Walt Disney Treasures: More Silly Symphonies, Volume Two. It was also released on Walt Disney Animation Collection: Classic Short Films Volume 2: Three Little Pigs in 2009 and on The Rescuers 35th Anniversary Edition (The Rescuers/The Rescuers Down Under) in 2012.
