= The Goddess of Spring =

- Directed by: Wilfred Jackson
- Story by: Bill Cottrell
- Produced by: Walt Disney
- Starring: Kenny Baker; Jessica Dragonette; Tudor Williams
- Music by: Leigh Harline
- Animation by: Cy Young; Hamilton Luske; Les Clark; Dick Huemer; Ward Kimball; Art Babbitt; Wolfgang Reitherman
- Layouts by: Ken Anderson
- Color process: Technicolor
- Production company: Walt Disney Productions
- Distributed by: United Artists
- Release date: November 3, 1934
- Running time: 8:58
- Country: United States
- Language: English

The Goddess of Spring is a 9-minute Silly Symphonies animated Disney short film. Unlike most Symphonies produced at the time, usually comedic, the short contains operatic themes and is often cited as melodramatic. It was released in 1934, and its production was important to the development of the later full-length Snow White and the Seven Dwarfs' style and animation, particularly regarding the usage of the rotoscoping technique for realistically-proportioned characters.

The plot follows the Greek myth of Persephone and Hades, known here by his Roman name of Pluto with imagery evocative of Hell and Satan (more specifically, a traditional stage Mephistopheles).

== Plot ==
Persephone lives in a beautiful garden of eternal spring. She is greeted by dancing flowers and elves who stand by her throne and defend her when Pluto, the God of the Underworld, comes to take her away. He plans to make her his queen in the Underworld, where she is crowned by Pluto and welcomed by a choir of imps. Meanwhile, above ground, the creatures suffer a rough winter and mourn the absence of their goddess.

In the Underworld, the Goddess of Spring weeps. Pluto shows concern for her unhappiness, and offers anything to make her happy; they reach the agreement that she will spend six months above ground and six below, resulting in the four seasons. She is allowed to return to her world, thawing the snow and ending the winter.

== Importance of production ==
When The Goddess of Spring was produced, it was an important stepping stone in the advancement of animation. The development of the human characters in The Goddess of Spring, specifically, would lead to the eventual animation of Snow White and the Seven Dwarfs. While Disney's animating staff was well-versed in the animation of animals, their experience in designing humans was severely underdeveloped. The Goddess of Spring was among the first string of short films in which they used human characters. It provided much-needed experience for the upcoming major motion picture that Disney was designing.

Although feature-length cartoons were initially disregarded, the animation advancements attributed to The Goddess of Spring, as they were displayed in Snow White and the Seven Dwarfs, led to the 1937 feature film becoming the highest-grossing sound film at the time.

== List of animators ==
The animators on staff for Disney's The Goddess of Spring were vital to the advancement of animation, as The Goddess of Spring was produced as "practice" for Snow White and the Seven Dwarfs. Several animators who worked on the short film later worked on the major motion picture.

- Cy Young
- Hamilton Luske
- Leonard Sebring
- Clyde Geronimi
- Les Clark
- Dick Huemer
- Art Babbitt
- Ugo D'Orsi
- Wolfgang Reitherman
- Frenchy de Tremaudan
- Louie Schmitt

== List of other staff ==
- Director: Wilfred Jackson
- Story creator: Bill Cottrell
- Music coordinator: Leigh Harline
- Voice actor: Kenny Baker (singing narrator)
- Voice actor: Tudor Williams (Hades)
- Voice actress: Jessica Dragonette (Proserpina)
- Character designer: Albert Hurter

== Home media ==
Disney released several collections of Silly Symphonies short films on VHS, DVD and Laserdisc. In the United States, The Goddess of Spring appeared on the VHS tape Cartoon Classics: First Series: Volume 13: Fanciful Fables.

It was also featured on the DVD versions of It's a Small World of Fun - Volume 4, Snow White and the Seven Dwarfs Platinum Edition, Walt Disney Treasures: More Silly Symphonies, Volume Two and Walt Disney Animation Collection: Volume 4: The Tortoise and the Hare. It was also included in bonus on the Blu-ray Diamond Edition of Snow White and the Seven Dwarfs.

In Japan, The Goddess of Spring appeared on Laserdisc on More Silly Symphonies, Donald Duck's 50 Crazy Years, Goin' Quackers, and Scary Tales. In Germany, France and Italy, the short film was released on VHS on Verrückte Musikanten, Silly Symphonies Volume 1, and Silly Symphonies Volume 2, respectively.

== Sources ==
- "The Goddess of Spring (Disney, 1934)." (1934) - The Internet Animation Database. The IAD, n.d. Web. 01 Feb. 2017.
- "The Serious History of Silly Symphonies". Oh My Disney. Insider, 20 May 2016. Web. 01 Feb. 2017.
- Davis, Amy M., & Eastleigh, U.K.: Bloomington, IN: John Libbey Pub.; Distributed in North America by Indiana University Press (2006). Good Girls and Wicked Witches: Women in Disney's Feature Animation.
- "Silly Symphonies". Silly Symphonies - The Encyclopedia of Disney Animated Shorts. N.p., n.d. Web. 01 Feb. 2017.
- "The Goddess of Spring". Disney Wiki. N.p., n.d. Web. 01 Feb. 2017.
