= Leo Cleary =

American actor

- Born: Leo Thomas Cleary; June 15, 1894; Boston, Massachusetts, U.S.
- Died: April 11, 1955 (aged 60); Van Nuys, Los Angeles, California, U.S.
- Resting place: Rose Hills Memorial Park
- Other name: Leo T. Cleary
- Occupation: Actor
- Years active: 1923–1954
- Spouse(s): Naomi Aloha Plant (m. 1912)

Leo Thomas Cleary (June 15, 1894 – April 11, 1955) was an American character actor in radio and film, and a vaudeville comedian and singer, perhaps best known as Dizzy Dean's minor league manager in The Pride of St. Louis, as the Catholic priest in The Red Menace, and as the original Old Ranger on the radio series, Death Valley Days.

== Early life and career ==
Born and raised in Boston, Massachusetts, Cleary was the only child of Benjamin Francis Cleary and Mary Clair Lyon. In 1909, the family relocated to Southern California, settling in Pasadena.

Noted for his expert mimicry and mastery of dialects, Cleary initially employed the standard "Jewface" portrayal of that era as his signature routine. Billed variously as "the Hebrew comedian," "the Yiddish Gazotsky," "the funniest Hebrew on the stage," and the "Ghetto kid," while also garnering kudos for his singing, Cleary began performing professionally no later than 1917. By 1919, his wife of seven years, soprano Naomi Plant, had joined the act.

=== Radio ===
In an interview conducted 14 years after his death, some measure of Cleary's contribution to Lux Radio Theatre's success was provided by former Billboard staffer Dean Owen, who dubbed Cleary the "pillar [of] Lux Theatre's stock company." On April 20, 1942, Cleary appeared in Lux Radio Theatre's adaptation of the 1941, Oscar-nominated biographical drama, One Foot in Heaven, portraying Preston Thurston, the part played by Gene Lockhart in the film.

Between 1935 and 1938, Cleary was part of a popular radio comedy team sometimes known as "Nuts and Bolts"—"Nuts" being Cleary and "Bolts" his fellow vaudeville alumnus, Ken Gillum. In March 1937, the pair went from being heard locally—on programs produced, respectively, in Los Angeles and New York—to being broadcast nationally over the NBC Blue Network.

One of Cleary's most substantial non-recurring roles was the protagonist of "My Brother Abe," an episode of the short-lived series Proudly We Hail, featuring a tremendously wealthy centenarian and his impatient heirs; "Abe" refers not only to his late, lamented brother, who had died at Gettysburg, but to the like-named late President, with whom he had had the good fortune to correspond.

=== Film ===
Notwithstanding a film career confined strictly to small supporting roles, the lion's share uncredited, Cleary did manage, in at least two of the four films in which he received an onscreen credit, to elicit reviewers' acknowledgement of his good work; namely, the 1950 prison drama, State Penitentiary, in which he doubles as the Warden and Narrator, and the 1952 baseball biopic, The Pride of St. Louis, in which Cleary portrays Ed Monroe, Dizzy Dean's minor league manager.

=== Miscellany ===
In 1940, Cleary was invited to a gathering of 50 members of the local Rotary Club in Arcadia, California, convened to honor the branch's outgoing president, John Vanderbur, who, in turn, received the brunt of Cleary's "ribbing," (Note: Presumably akin to the later Celebrity "Roasts," the latter term evidently not having been coined until almost a decade later.) much to the amusement of those present.

== Filmography ==
Year	Title	Role	Notes
1935	Who Killed Cock Robin?	Irish Cop	uncredited
1935	Broken Toys	Various	uncredited
1940	You Can't Fool Your Wife	Mr. Doolittle	uncredited
1940	Anne of Windy Poplars		uncredited
1940	Millionaires in Prison	Deputy Taking Collins To Prison	uncredited
1940	Dance, Girl, Dance	Court Clerk	uncredited
1942	A Date with the Falcon	Detective Brody	uncredited
1942	Golf Slappy	Narrator	uncredited
1947	Honeymoon	Barnes	uncredited
1949	The Red Menace	Father O'Leary	uncredited
1949	Brimstone	Judge	uncredited
1949	White Heat	Railroad Fireman	uncredited
1950	Johnny Holiday	Trimble	
1950	Bells of Coronado	Dr. Frank Harding	
1950	State Penitentiary	Warden-Narrator	as Leo T. Cleary
1950	The Great Jewel Robber	Haley	uncredited
1951	Storm Warning	Barnet	uncredited
1951	Lightning Strikes Twice	Editor	uncredited
1951	Love Nest	Detective Donovan	uncredited
1951	Desert of Lost Men	Dr. Stephens	uncredited
1952	The Pride of St. Louis	Houston Mgr. Ed Monroe	as Leo T. Cleary
1952	Confidence Girl	Andrew Sheridan	uncredited
1952	Glory Alley	Pastor	uncredited
1952	Sally and St. Anne	Judge Duffin	uncredited
1952	Woman of the North Country	Sheriff	uncredited
1952	Dreamboat	Court Clerk	uncredited
1953	The I Don't Care Girl	Studio Receptionist	uncredited
1953	Your Jeweler's Showcase (TV); Ep. "The Woman of Bally Runion""		
1953	The Kid from Left Field	Yankee Manager	uncredited
1953	The Human Jungle	Karns	

== Personal life and death ==
From May 18, 1912 until his death, Cleary was married to Naomi Aloha Plant. They had two sons, Jack and Richard. The latter had a brief acting career of his own during the late 1940s and early 50s, most notably with a substantial role in both the original Broadway run and subsequent tour of Stalag 17.

As of January 1920, and continuing through at least May of that year, Cleary owned the company, Leo's Auto Painting Shop, offering "first class work" and "moderate prices".

Judging from an article published by The Pasadena Post in March 1920 (dubbing him "the famous Elk comedian"), Cleary was, at the very least, a member of the Elks Lodge for very near his entire adult life.

On April 11, 1955, Cleary died of kidney failure at Van Nuys Valley Hospital, Survived by his mother, wife, sons and four grandchildren, Cleary's cremated remains are interred at Rose Hills Memorial Park in Whittier, California.
