= The Spider and the Fly (1931 film) =

1931 film by Wilfred Jackson

- Title card
- Directed by: Wilfred Jackson
- Produced by: Walt Disney
- Animation by: Charles Byrne; Harry Reeves
- Color process: Black and white
- Production company: Walt Disney Productions
- Distributed by: Columbia Pictures
- Release date: October 16, 1931
- Running time: 7 min
- Country: United States
- Language: English

The Spider and the Fly is a 1931 American animated short film directed by Wilfred Jackson. It is the 23rd film of the Silly Symphonies series.

== Plot ==
A kitchen is filled with flies. A spider wakes up and plays its web like a harp, attracting a pair of them; the female is trapped, and the male summons the cavalry, which arrives riding bees, riding butterflies to drop pepper bombs, firing champagne bottles, and ultimately setting the web on fire and catching the spider on flypaper when it falls.

== Reception ==
Motion Picture Herald (December 19, 1931): "An Animated Pinnacle: Never in his experience has this reviewer seen a more novel, clever or thoroughly entertaining animated cartoon, than is this Walt Disney Silly Symphony number. An opening night audience at the New York Criterion burst into a storm of applause at its conclusion, and well the most unusual number deserved it. When the fly's sweetheart is enmeshed in the spiders' web, the army, on wings, on the backs of horse-flies with pins for lances and with dragon flies acting as bombing planes, sweeps to her assistance. Dozens of tremendously clever new drawings and original ideas are incorporated in this smart animated subject. By all means play it, and the audience will talk about it for a week."

The Film Daily (December 20, 1931): "A Knockout. This Disney cartoon is one of the best to come along in moons. For basic idea, ingenious workmanship and effective sound and musical accompaniment it is hard to beat. It shows a flock of flies, and a couple of loverbird flies in particular, disporting themselves in a kitchen. A villainous spider lures a lady fly to his net, whereupon her hero rushes to the rescue, finally calling in the assistance of the entire fly army, which vanquishes the spider. Can't miss with any audience."

== Home media ==
The short was released on December 19, 2006, on Walt Disney Treasures: More Silly Symphonies, Volume Two.
