= Purv Pullen =

American actor

- Born: Almy Purves Pullen; February 2, 1909; Philadelphia, Pennsylvania, U.S.
- Died: October 18, 1992 (aged 83); Woodland Hills, California, U.S.
- Occupation: Voice actor
- Known for: Animal vocal effects

Almy Purves "Purv" Pullen (February 2, 1909 – October 18, 1992), later known by the stage name Dr. Horatio Q. Birdbath (or simply Dr. Birdbath), was an American voice actor. He was known for mimicking the sounds of animals and birds.

== Early life ==
Pullen was born on February 2, 1909, in Philadelphia, Pennsylvania and grew up in Akron, Ohio. Growing up on a farm, he began imitating bird-calls. Boy's Scout also helped Pullen improved this skill. At age 12, he was already performing at local events due to his whistling. He incorporated bird-calls into his first job as a disc jockey in Akron, and at other radio stations.

== Career ==
Pullen began performing as a voice actor in films in the 1930s. He was the voice of Cheetah in Tarzan films and produced the bird sounds in Disney's Snow White and the Seven Dwarfs (1937). Pullen's vocal contributions appear in many cartoons featuring Mickey Mouse, Betty Boop, and Popeye. Pullen was also the voice of the howling coyote in Cecil B. DeMille's 1935 film The Crusades, and the squawks and jungle sounds for Martin Denny's 1959 pop instrumental "Quiet Village".

In 1945, Pullen began a collaboration with Spike Jones, providing sound effects and other comic gimmicks on many of the classic Jones recordings. Jones gave Pullen the stage name "Dr. Horatio Q. Birdbath."

Pullen provided background bird vocals in Walt Disney's Enchanted Tiki Room at Disneyland and Walt Disney World. He was also heard in the San Francisco Bay Area as the voice of Roscoe the Dog on the Dr. Don Rose show on KFRC.

Pullen also appeared in nightclubs as a ventriloquist with a dummy named Johnny. He appeared on a 1958 episode of What's My Line? as the mystery guest.

== Personal life ==
Pullen was a longtime resident of Vacaville, California, where he performed puppet shows at the Nut Tree in the 1970s and 1980s and where he appeared with "Roscoe the Dog," a supposedly invisible dog puppeted by means of a stiffened dog leash.

== Filmography ==
Title	Date	Role	Credited As	Details	Notes
The Bird Store	1932	Birds			
Birds in the Spring	1933	Birds			
Who Killed Cock Robin?	1935	Cock Robin's Whistling			
Snow White and the Seven Dwarfs	1937	Birds (voice)	Uncredited		
Cinderella	1950	Birds (voice)	Uncredited		
Bedtime for Bonzo	1951	Minor Role (voice)	Uncredited		
Bonzo Goes to College	1952	Minor Role (voice)	Uncredited		
Sleeping Beauty	1959	Birds (voice)	Uncredited		
Walt Disney's Enchanted Tiki Room	1963	Birds (voice)			
