= Bucky Bug =

Disney comics character

- First appearance: Silly Symphony (comic strip) (January 10, 1932)

In-universe information
- Species: Beetle
- Gender: Male
- Significant other: June Bug (wife)

Bucky Bug is a beetle who appears in Disney comics. He first appeared in the Silly Symphony Sunday comic strip, and later appeared as a regular feature in the comic book Walt Disney's Comics and Stories.

== Silly Symphony ==
Bucky Bug first appeared in the initial Silly Symphony strip, beginning January 10, 1932; he was the first character to debut in Disney comics. He was initially drawn by Earl Duvall, who subsequently left Disney and joined Warner Brothers where he created Buddy (Looney Tunes).

Bucky only had one film appearance, in "Bugs in Love", released in October 1932.

Bucky Bug also appeared in Walt Disney's Comics and Stories. Starting in issue #20 (May 1942), the comic began reprinting some of Bucky's original 1930s Silly Symphony strips. The reprints continued until issue #28 (Jan 1943), and were then replaced by Little Hiawatha strips.

=== Stories ===
Bucky's Silly Symphony storylines were initially unnamed; the action moved from one week to the next, with no explicit break between chapters. In reprints, however, a set of names has become the standard:

- Bucky Makes His Name (January 10 to April 10, 1932)
- The Quest for Fortune (April 17 to June 19)
- Adventures in Junkville (June 26 to August 7)
- Introducing Lucky Bucks (August 14)
- Bugs in Love (August 21 to November 6)
- War with the Flies (November 13, 1932 to April 16, 1933)
- The Old Folks' New Home (April 23 to June 4, 1933)
- In Mother Goose Land (June 11 to November 5)
- Return to Junkville (November 12, 1933 to March 14, 1934)

The Bucky strips ended with Bucky and June saying goodbye to the readers:

We're leaving this page,
And saying good-bye --
But we will not
Ever forget ya!
We're settling down,
As all bugs should!
So long! We're glad
To have met ya!

On March 11, 1934, the Silly Symphony strip moved to its next storyline, based on the short Birds of a Feather.

== Walt Disney's Comics and Stories ==
In 1943, the anthology comic book Walt Disney's Comics and Stories began publishing original full-length comic book stories, and the first new 10-page Bucky story appeared in issue #39 (December 1943) - "A Cure for Gout", by Al Taliaferro. Bucky's stories appeared monthly for the next six years, ending with issue #120 (September 1950). The stories were drawn by a number of artists, including Carl Buettner, Vivie Risto, Ralph Heimdahl and Tony Strobl.

Bucky's supporting characters included June Bug (Bucky's girlfriend and later wife), Bo Bug (a hobo and Bucky's best friend), the Mayor (June's father), Grandpa Bootle Beetle (Bucky's adopted grandfather), and others. American Bucky stories almost always had the characters speaking in rhyme.

Bucky still makes frequent appearances in Dutch stories up to the present time.

Bucky is the first Disney character to make his first appearance in a comic strip outside the Mickey Mouse Universe.

He made a very brief cameo early in the 1988 Touchstone Pictures/Amblin Entertainment film Who Framed Roger Rabbit.
