= Sabotage (1936 film) =

1936 film by Alfred Hitchcock

- US theatrical release poster
- Directed by: Alfred Hitchcock
- Screenplay by: Charles Bennett
- Based on: The Secret Agent; 1907 novel by Joseph Conrad
- Produced by: Michael Balcon
- Starring: Sylvia Sidney; Oscar Homolka; John Loder
- Cinematography: Bernard Knowles
- Edited by: Charles Frend
- Music by: Jack Beaver
- Production company: Gaumont-British
- Distributed by: General Film Distributors
- Release dates: 2 December 1936 (London trade preview); 11 January 1937 (USA); 8 February 1937 (UK)
- Running time: 76 minutes
- Country: United Kingdom
- Language: English

Sabotage, released in the United States as The Woman Alone, is a 1936 British spy thriller film directed by Alfred Hitchcock starring Sylvia Sidney, Oscar Homolka, and John Loder. It is loosely based on Joseph Conrad's 1907 novel The Secret Agent, about a woman who discovers that her husband is a terrorist agent.

Sabotage should not be confused with Hitchcock's film Secret Agent, which was also released in 1936, but which instead is loosely based on two stories in the 1927 collection Ashenden: Or the British Agent by W. Somerset Maugham. It also should not be conflated with Hitchcock's unrelated 1942 American film Saboteur.

In 2017, a poll of 150 actors, directors, writers, producers and critics for Time Out magazine ranked the film 44th best British film ever. In 2021, The Daily Telegraph ranked the film at No. 3 on its list of "The 100 best British films of all time".

== Plot ==
In London, sand is put into the bearings of an electrical generator, causing a power blackout. At a cinema owned by Karl Verloc, people demand their money back. Verloc enters through a back entrance to the living quarters above. He washes sand from his hands, but when his wife comes for him, he pretends to have been asleep. He instructs her to refund the money, saying he has "some money coming in" anyway. As the money is about to be disbursed to the customers downstairs, the lights go back on.

The next day, Verloc meets his contact. They are part of a gang of terrorists from an unnamed European country who are planning a series of attacks in London, though no exact motive is made clear. Verloc's contact is disappointed that the newspapers mocked the short loss of electricity, and instructs Verloc to place a parcel of "fireworks" at the Piccadilly Circus tube station on Saturday, during the Lord Mayor's Show. Verloc is not comfortable with killing, but his contact says to get someone else to do it. Verloc is given the address of a bird shop, whose owner also makes bombs.

Scotland Yard suspects Verloc's involvement in the plot and has placed Detective Sergeant Ted Spencer undercover as a greengrocer's helper next to the cinema. He befriends Mrs. Verloc and her younger brother, Stevie, who lives with them, by treating them to a meal at Simpson's. At this point, Spencer and Scotland Yard are unsure whether Mrs. Verloc is complicit in the terrorist plots or innocently unaware; but by the end of the meal, he is convinced she is innocent and is falling for her.

Verloc goes to the bird shop. The bomb-maker says he will prepare a time bomb and set it to explode at 1:45 p.m. on Saturday. Later that night, members of the terrorist group meet in Verloc's living room above the cinema. Detective Spencer attempts to eavesdrop on the conversation, but is seen and recognized. The meeting ends abruptly and the members scatter, worried that they are all being followed. Verloc tells his wife the police are investigating him, but maintains his innocence.

The next day, Verloc receives a package containing two caged canaries – a present for Stevie – and the bomb. Spencer shows up with Stevie and tells Mrs. Verloc of Scotland Yard's suspicions. Verloc sees them talking, and becomes nervous. Before he can be questioned, Verloc asks Stevie to deliver a film canister to another cinema, and since it is on his way, to deposit another package in the cloakroom at Piccadilly Circus station by 1:30 p.m. He says it contains projector parts to be repaired and the repairman will collect it there.

Unknowingly carrying the time bomb for Verloc, Stevie is delayed by several events, including the Lord Mayor's Show procession. Now late, Stevie manages to talk himself aboard a bus to Piccadilly Circus, even though flammable nitrate film is not allowed on public vehicles. The bomb explodes on the bus, killing Stevie and others.

Verloc confesses to his wife, but blames Scotland Yard and Spencer for Stevie's death, since they were the ones who prevented Verloc from delivering the bomb himself. Soon afterwards, as they are preparing to eat dinner, she becomes angry and sullen. He walks toward her slowly as she grabs a carving knife in front of her. He suddenly moves toward her, stabbing himself, and dies. When Spencer arrives to arrest Verloc he realises what has happened, but he insists that she should not admit stabbing her husband. Even if it was self-defence, she might not be believed in court. Spencer plans to abandon his career and leave the country with her.

The bomb-maker goes to Verloc's flat to retrieve the birdcage in case it might incriminate him, but the police, who already suspect him, follow him. When they arrive, Mrs. Verloc tries to confess, but seconds after she says her husband is dead, the bomb-maker sets off a bomb he was carrying, killing himself and destroying Verloc's body.

Afterwards, the police superintendent is unsure whether she spoke before or after the explosion, as Ted and Mrs. Verloc walk away through the street crowd.

== Cast ==
- Sylvia Sidney (Note: Credited as "Sylvia Sydney") as Mrs. Verloc
- Oscar Homolka as Karl Anton Verloc
- Desmond Tester as Stevie
- John Loder as Sergeant Ted Spencer
- Joyce Barbour as Renee
- Matthew Boulton as Superintendent Talbot
- S. J. Warmington as Hollingshead
- Charles Hawtrey as a Studious Youth at the aquarium (uncredited)
- Peter Bull as Michaelisa, a Conspirator (uncredited)
- Torin Thatcher as Yunct (uncredited)

== Production ==
Hitchcock wanted to cast Robert Donat – with whom he had previously worked in The 39 Steps (1935) – as Spencer, but was forced to cast another actor (John Loder) owing to Donat's chronic asthma. According to Hitchcock, in his interviews with the French director François Truffaut, Alexander Korda, to whom Donat was under contract, refused to release him. Hitchcock, who was not happy with Loder's casting, later commented, "The actor we got wasn't suitable, and I was forced to rewrite the dialogue during the shooting". Charles Bennett says Sylvia Sidney was upset when Loder was cast because she agreed to make the film to work with Donat.

Hitchcock also chose the young Bobby Rietti – later known as Robert Rietti – to play the part of Steve, but for legal reasons was not able to sign him.

== Reception ==
Frank S. Nugent of The New York Times praised the film as "a masterly exercise in suspense." Variety wrote, "Competent and experienced hand of the director is apparent throughout this production, which is a smart one and executed in a business-like manner from start to finish." However, the review noted that the motivation of the terrorists "is not made clear. As a result, the audience watches the piece and its suspensive moments with interest, and when it is over, is still hazy as to the why and wherefore." Harrison's Reports called it "A thrilling melodrama," adding that Hitchcock "again shows his skill in building up a situation to a tense climax." The Monthly Film Bulletin wrote, "The individual genius of Hitchcock is very clearly shown in the distinctive and original direction," and called Oscar Homolka's performance "remarkable." John Mosher of The New Yorker called it "rather exciting for the most part. It's a lively, minor Alfred Hitchcock picture." Writing for The Spectator, Graham Greene gave the film a good review, pronouncing that "in Sabotage for the first time [Hitchcock] has really 'come off'". Greene identified the children's matinée scene as an "ingenious and pathetic twist stamped as Mr Hitchcock's own", and he praised the melodrama present in the screenplay writing, the dialogue, and the acting cast generally. Greene's only complaint was in relation to the acting of the "unconvincing" detective (Loder) and the "invincibl[y] distaste[ful]" prep school student (Tester).

On the review aggregator site Rotten Tomatoes, Sabotage has a 91% approval rating based on 11 reviews, with an average rating of 7.4/10. On Metacritic, which uses a weighted average, the film has an 85 out of 100 score, based on 9 reviews.

== Adaptation ==
Bennett liberally adapted Joseph Conrad's novel, transforming the highly political Tsarist-era agents provocateurs into foreign agents without any obvious political leanings. Verloc's shop is transformed into a cinema, with the films being shown echoing the story, and the policeman investigating the case is an undercover officer posing as a greengrocer. Since the film was produced in the years immediately preceding World War II, the unnamed hostile power behind the bombings has been assumed by many viewers to be Nazi Germany. However, the film does not specify this, and indeed, Verloc's first name has been changed, presumably because his name in the novel, Adolf, had too many connotations by the time the film was made.

Stevie, Mrs. Verloc's brother, is portrayed as an ordinary schoolboy, with few of the visionary attributes of his literary counterpart. Stevie's death is a climactic moment in the plot, providing insight into Hitchcock's views about how the innocent suffer through random acts of violence. When a critic condemned Stevie's death as brutal and unnecessary, Hitchcock said that he regretted including it in the film, not because of the brutality, however, but because it violated his method of suspense, whereby tension eventually had to be relieved. Yet, Hitchcock remained faithful to the novel in having the bomb go off, and it also allowed him to justify in the movie that the boy's sister would eventually kill her husband, who was responsible for the boy's death, and get away with it.

== Allusions ==
The fact that many scenes of the film were set in a cinema allowed Hitchcock to include references to contemporary films and storylines. Perhaps the most famous of these is the final film sequence, an excerpt from one of Walt Disney's Silly Symphonies, Who Killed Cock Robin? (1935).

== Legacy ==
Quentin Tarantino used the scene where Stevie is initially not allowed onto the bus due to the nitrate film he is carrying, in his film Inglourious Basterds. This was used to explain the use of nitrate film for the character's terrorist plot.
