= Santa's Workshop (film) =

1932 film by Wilfred Jackson

- Title card
- Directed by: Wilfred Jackson
- Produced by: Walt Disney
- Music by: Frank Churchill
- Color process: Technicolor
- Production company: Walt Disney Productions
- Distributed by: United Artists
- Release date: December 10, 1932
- Running time: 7 minutes
- Country: United States
- Language: English

Santa's Workshop is a 1932 American animated short film directed by Wilfred Jackson. It was released on December 10, 1932. It is the 33rd film of the Silly Symphonies series and the first to use RCA Photophone sound; Disney stopped using Cinephone as it was a pirated version of Vitaphone used by Pat Powers, who Disney had cut ties with years prior.

A sequel, The Night Before Christmas, partially based on the 1823 poem "A Visit from St. Nicholas", was made the year after, portraying Santa leaving the toys in a house with nine children.

== Plot summary ==
Some elves are cleaning Santa's Sleigh and reindeer while singing, preparing for the sleigh ride on Christmas Eve. In his workshop, Santa Claus reads through each letter sent from every boy and girl asking for toys. Santa's little helpers hurry to finish the toys, which come to life and march into Santa’s bag, so he can embark on his journey around the globe.

== Voice cast ==
- Santa Claus: Walter Geiger
- Deep-voice gnome: Jesse Delos Jewkes
- Santa's secretary: Pinto Colvig
- Santa's second helper: Walt Disney

== TV version ==
In 1958, the short was edited into Walt Disney anthology tv series episode From All of Us to All of You (1958).

In Sweden and Norway, Santa's Workshop is also part of the television special From All of Us to All of You, traditionally shown on Christmas Eve. At the initiative of Disney, scenes depicting various ethnic stereotypes such as a pickaninny doll and a Jewish doll have been cut out of the film, which has given rise to a lot of public criticism in Sweden and in Denmark.

== Home media ==
The short was featured on early VHS releases of A Walt Disney Christmas, which featured the uncut scene with the blackface doll.

The short was released on DVD on December 19, 2006, on Walt Disney Treasures: More Silly Symphonies, Volume Two in the "From the Vault" section, because of the blackface doll.

The short was remastered in HD and released on Disney+ on November 12, 2019, with the blackface doll scene removed. It was originally claimed by Disney+ that the short was presented as originally released, but this claim has since been removed from the streaming service.

== See also ==
- List of Christmas films
- Santa Claus in film
