= Bugs in Love =

1932 film by Burt Gillett

- Title card
- Directed by: Burt Gillett
- Produced by: Walt Disney
- Music by: Frank Churchill
- Color process: Black and white
- Production company: Walt Disney Productions
- Distributed by: United Artists
- Release date: October 1, 1932
- Running time: 7 min
- Country: United States
- Language: English

Bugs in Love is a 1932 American animated short film directed by Burt Gillett. It was released on October 1, 1932. It is the 30th film of the Silly Symphonies series and the final Silly Symphony to be released in black-and-white.

== Plot ==
A carnival is made by insects out of garbage. The carnival includes a Ferris wheel made out of a bike tire and pedals, a "slide" made out of a pipe, and a record player "merry-go-round".

Two love bugs are skating on a broken mirror when the female bug leaves to go home to freshen up. The male bug follows her.

While the two are courting, a crow flies by and spots the two bugs. Licking his lips, he sneaks closer to them. He starts chasing after the two bugs. The crow scares the male bug into a glass bottle and puts a cork on the bottle. The female bug runs into her home. The crow follows her, and chases her around the room while she tries to hide.

Meanwhile, the male bug escapes from the bottle he was trapped in and runs to save his lover. The male bug begins to fight the crow when another bug sees the battle. He warns all the other bugs at the carnival about the crow. The bugs stop what they are doing and together defeat the crow and save the couple.

== Comic adaptations ==
The Silly Symphony comic strip began on January 10, 1932 with a storyline about Bucky Bug, an original character inspired by Bugs in Love. Bucky starred in the Silly Symphony strip until March 4, 1934.

In 1943, the anthology comic book Walt Disney's Comics and Stories began publishing original full-length comic book stories, and the first new 10-page Bucky Bug story appeared in issue #39 (December 1943) - "A Cure for Gout", by Al Taliaferro. Bucky's stories appeared monthly for the next six years, ending with issue #120 (September 1950). The stories were drawn by a number of artists, including Carl Buettner, Vivie Risto, Ralph Heimdahl and Tony Strobl.

== Home media ==
The short was released on December 19, 2006 on Walt Disney Treasures: More Silly Symphonies, Volume Two.
