= Little Hiawatha =

- Theatrical re-release poster
- Directed by: David Hand
- Produced by: Walt Disney
- Starring: Sally Noble; Mary Rosetti; Millie Walters
- Narrated by: Gayne Whitman
- Music by: Albert Hay Malotte
- Animation by: Dick Huemer; Charles Thorson; Ollie Johnston; Fred Moore; Frank Thomas
- Color process: Technicolor
- Production company: Walt Disney Productions
- Distributed by: United Artists
- Release date: May 15, 1937 (U.S.)
- Country: United States
- Language: English

Little Hiawatha (also called Hiawatha) is a 1937 Silly Symphonies animated short film produced by Walt Disney, inspired by the poem The Song of Hiawatha by Henry Wadsworth Longfellow. The short does not appear to have historical correlation to legendary Mohawk leader and peacemaker Hiawatha. It was the last Silly Symphonies short to be released by United Artists.

== Plot ==
Over opening narration, a Native American boy named Little Hiawatha is seen paddling his canoe down a river – at one point backwards – on his way to hunt game. Upon reaching land, he steps out and immediately falls down a hidden hole in the water, bringing about the laughter of the animals in the forest. Hiawatha gives chase to them – with his pants often falling down as the cartoon's running gag.

Hiawatha pursues a grasshopper, but is foiled when it spits in his face, much to the amusement of the other animals. He chases them again and manages to corner a baby rabbit on a tree stump; he finds, however, that he cannot bring himself to kill it, especially when it repeatedly gives him sad glances, and even after he arms it with a spare bow and arrow. Frustrated, he shoos it back to its family and then breaks his bow and arrow, to the animals' great delight.

Shortly afterwards, Hiawatha comes across a set of bear tracks, which leads him to a face-to-face encounter with a bear cub. He chases after it, but runs into the cub's protective mother, who aggressively chases him through the forest. In gratitude for Hiawatha sparing their lives, the other animals band together to keep him out of the bear's clutches, including raccoons using a vine to trip the bear, opossums flinging Hiawatha through the air, and beavers cutting down trees in the bear's path, among other things. Finally returning safely to his canoe, Hiawatha rows off into the sunset as the animals gather together and bid him farewell.

== Comics ==
The Silly Symphony Sunday comic strip featured an adaptation of Little Hiawatha for eight months, from November 10, 1940, to July 12, 1942, based on drawings from Charlie Thorson.

The character moved to comic book stories in 1943. First, he appeared as a secondary character (named "Little Bear") in a story featuring Flower in Walt Disney's Comics and Stories #30 (March 1943). This was followed a year later with an 8-page story headlined by Little Minnehaha (Hiawatha's best friend) in Walt Disney's Comics and Stories #43 (April 1944). Two more "Little Minnehaha" stories were printed in 1944, followed by appearances in the Vacation Parade specials in 1950 and 1951. Little Hiawatha returned as a regular feature in Walt Disney's Comics and Stories starting with issue #143 (August 1952), and by the end of the year, he got his own one-shot comic: Four Color #439 (December 1952).

In Europe, locally drawn Hiawatha comics ran in the local Donald Duck comic magazines well into the 21st century.

== Home media ==
The short was released on the 2000 DVD release of Pocahontas II: Journey to a New World and again on December 19, 2006, on Walt Disney Treasures: More Silly Symphonies, Volume Two.

It was released on Blu-ray in 2012 as a bonus feature for Pocahontas.
