= Pink Jeep Tours =

Tour operator

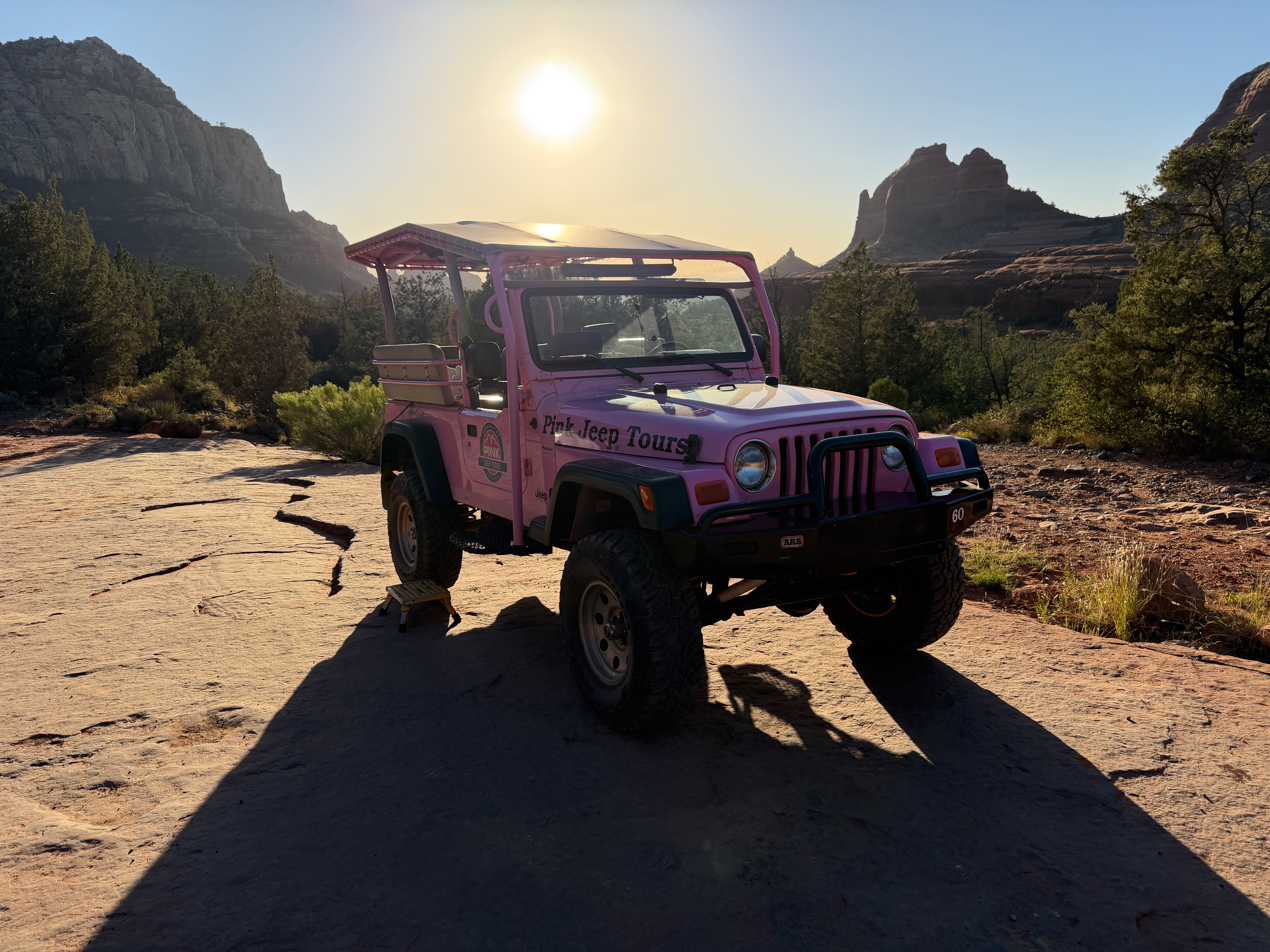
A Pink Jeep Tours jeep on Schnebly Hill Road in Sedona (2025)

Pink Jeep Tours is a passenger tour operator that offers off-road and road-based excursions to various destinations across the American Southwest, with locations in Sedona, Las Vegas, Pigeon Forge, Branson, and the Grand Canyon. The company has been in operation since 1960. Pink Jeep Tours is especially known for its tour of the Broken Arrow trail in Sedona, and it is the only tour operator permitted by the United States Forest Service to use the trail.

== History ==
Don Pratt, a musician and land developer who relocated to Sedona from Long Beach, California, founded Pink Jeep Tours in 1960. The original name of the company was Don Pratt Adventures, but after a vacation at the Royal Hawaiian Hotel in Waikiki, also known as the "Pink Palace of the Pacific" due to its color, Pratt returned to Sedona, painted his vehicles pink, and changed the name to Pink Jeep Tours. The company has been owned by Shawn Wendell since 1988.

== Historic preservation ==
Pink Jeep Tours is the official site steward of the Honanki Heritage Site, a 13th-century Sinagua cliff dwelling. For its role in preserving the site, the company was awarded a grant by Save America’s Treasures in 1999, a program which helps preserve nationally significant historic properties. The company’s tour guides include the "preservation ethic" in all of their tours.
