= Hamilton Luske =

American film director

- Born: Hamilton Somers Luske; October 16, 1903; Chicago, Illinois, United States
- Died: February 19, 1968 (aged 64); Bel Air, California, United States
- Employer: Walt Disney Productions (1931–1968)
- Children: 4

Hamilton Somers Luske (October 16, 1903 – February 19, 1968) was an American animator and film director.

== Career ==
Luske joined the Walt Disney Productions animation studio in 1931, and he was soon trusted enough by Walt Disney to be made supervising animator of the first Disney Princess character, Snow White in Snow White and the Seven Dwarfs.

He was also an animator on the 1938 short film Ferdinand the Bull.

He directed many Disney films and animated shorts from 1936 until he died in 1968. In 1965, he won the Academy Award for Best Visual Effects for directing the animated sequence in the Julie Andrews musical Mary Poppins (1964).

He was born in Chicago, Illinois, on October 16, 1903, and died in Bel Air, California, on February 19, 1968, at age 64.

Luske was the father of director and actor Tommy Luske, who provided the voice of Michael Darling in Peter Pan.

== Filmography as director ==
- Pinocchio (1940)
- Fantasia (1940)
- The Reluctant Dragon (1941)
- Saludos Amigos (Perdo segment) (1942)
- Make Mine Music (The Whale Who Wanted to Sing at the Met segment) (1946)
- Fun and Fancy Free (Mickey and the Beanstalk segment) (1947)
- Melody Time (Once Upon a Wintertime, Trees segments) (1948)
- So Dear to My Heart (1948)
- Cinderella (1950)
- Alice in Wonderland (1951)
- Peter Pan (1953)
- Ben and Me (1953)
- Lady and the Tramp (1955)
- Donald in Mathmagic Land (1959)
- 101 Dalmatians (1961)
- Mary Poppins (1964) (animation director)
- Scrooge McDuck and Money (1967)

== Periodical illustration ==
- "News Item", Photoplay, May 1930, p. 74. Signed "Ham Luske".
