= Wilfred Jackson =

American animator and film director (1906–1988)

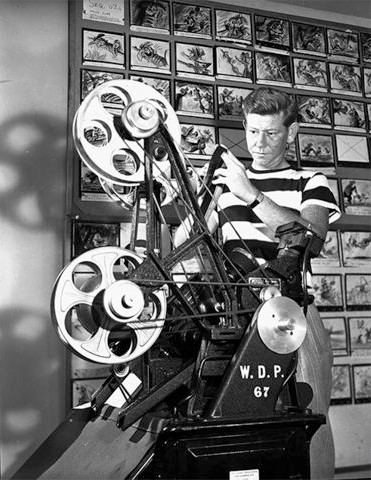
- Born: January 24, 1906; Chicago, Illinois, U.S.
- Died: August 7, 1988 (aged 82); Newport Beach, California, U.S.
- Other name: Jaxon
- Occupations: Animator; arranger; composer; film director
- Years active: 1928–1961
- Employer: Walt Disney Productions

Wilfred Emmons Jackson (January 24, 1906 – August 7, 1988) was an American animator, musical arranger and director best known for his work with Walt Disney Productions.

Jackson joined Walt Disney Productions in 1928 as a volunteer washing animation cels. He was soon promoted to an animator and was instrumental in developing the Mickey Mousing technique, which synchronized the music and action for Steamboat Willie (1928). He was then made the director for the Mickey Mouse and Silly Symphonies cartoon series, of which he directed the Academy Award-winning short films: The Tortoise and the Hare (1935), The Country Cousin (1936), and The Old Mill (1937). His feature film directorial debut was Snow White and the Seven Dwarfs (1937).

Jackson next worked as a sequence director for Pinocchio (1940) and the Night on Bald Mountain/Ave Maria segment of Fantasia (1940). He then co-directed several theatrical Disney animated features up to Lady and the Tramp (1955). In 1953, Jackson suffered a heart attack while directing Sleeping Beauty (1959). A year later, after recovering, Disney asked Jackson to produce and direct animated segments for the Disneyland series. After nearly 35 years with Disney, he retired in 1961.

== Biography ==
=== Early life ===
Jackson was born in Chicago, Illinois, but his family moved to Glendale, California. At a young age, he attended a screening of Jack and the Beanstalk (1917), starring Francis Carpenter. In 1924, he graduated from Glendale High School in 1924. After graduating, Jackson wanted to attend college, but his parents could not afford it. Wanting to pursue a career in animation, Jackson compromised with his father to attend an art school for two years. To pay for his tuition at Otis Art Institute (now called Otis College of Art and Design), Jackson recalled he "spent a year working at odd jobs, mostly gardening, things like that, and got enough saved up."

=== Career ===
Seeking an animation job, Jackson learned that the leading animation studios at the studio were at New York City but he was unable to relocate. Through an acquaintance from a close friend, Jackson called Walt Disney, producer at Walt Disney Productions, then one of the few California-based animation studios to experience box office success. He soon arrived at the studio and showed Disney his portfolio. After examining his portfolio, Disney felt Jackson was not ready to be an animator, to which Jackson volunteered to work unpaid for him. Disney agreed, and Jackson was assigned to help John Lott, a studio janitor, wash paint off the animation cels.

Several of the Silly Symphony shorts he directed, including The Old Mill (1937), won Academy Awards during the 1930s. In 1937, he made his directorial film debut with Snow White and the Seven Dwarfs. He then directed sequences in many of the major Disney animated features up to Lady and the Tramp in 1955, including all of the animated sequences in Song of the South (1946). He later moved into television, producing and directing for Disney's Disneyland series. After continuing health issues, he retired in 1961.

== Personal life and death ==
Jackson met his wife Jane Ames while studying at the Otis Art Institute. They married on February 23, 1929 and had two daughters, Barbara and Virginia.

Jackson died on August 7, 1988 at his home on Balboa Island, at the age of 82.

== Filmography ==
Year	Title	Credits
1937	Snow White and the Seven Dwarfs	Sequence Director
1940	Pinocchio	Sequence Director
1940	Fantasia	Director - Segment "Night on Bald Mountain/Ave Maria"
1941	Dumbo	Sequence Director
1943	Saludos Amigos (Short)	Sequence Director
1946	A Feather in His Collar (Short)	Director
1946	Song of the South	Cartoon Director
1948	Melody Time	Cartoon Director – Segment Johnny Appleseed
1950	Cinderella	Director
1951	Alice in Wonderland	Director
1953	Peter Pan	Director
1955	Lady and the Tramp	Director
1955	Dateline: Disneyland (TV Special documentary)	Director
1954–1959	The Magical World of Disney (TV Series)	Himself – 1 Episode / Director – 9 Episodes / Segment Director – 2 Episodes / Sequence Director – 1 Episode / Cartoon Director – 1 Episode
1992	The Music of Disney: A Legacy in Song (Video documentary)	Performer: "Turkey in the Straw"
2002	American Legends (Video)	Director – Segment "Johnny Appleseed"

== Works cited ==
- Barrier, Michael (1999). Hollywood Cartoons: American Animation in Its Golden Age. Oxford University Press. ISBN 978-0-198-02079-0.
- Barrier, Michael (2008). The Animated Man: A Life of Walt Disney. University of California Press. ISBN 978-0-520-25619-4.
- Care, Ross (2016). Ghez, Didier (ed.). Disney Legend Wilfred Jackson: A Life in Animation. Theme Park Press. ISBN 978-1-683-90037-5.
- Gabler, Neal (2006). Walt Disney: The Triumph of the American Imagination. Vintage Books. ISBN 978-0-679-75747-4.
- Lenburg, Jeff (2006). Who's who in Animated Cartoons. Applause Books. p. 159. ISBN 978-1-5578-3671-7.
- Thomas, Bob (1994) [1976]. Walt Disney: An American Original. New York: Hyperion. ISBN 978-0-786-86027-2.
