= Jakob Bjarnar Grétarsson =

- Born: 1962 (age 63–64)
- Occupation: Journalist
- Employer: Sýn

Jakob Bjarnar Grétarsson (born 1962) is an Icelandic journalist, radio host, writer and musician. He was a member of the band Kátir piltar in the 1980s to the early 1990s. He is known for co-hosting the radio shows Górilla, Sleggjan and King Kong along with Davíð Þór Jónsson and Steinn Ármann Magnússon in the 1990s. He is currently a journalist at Vísir.is.
