= The Ugly Duckling (1939 film) =

- Poster for The Ugly Duckling
- Directed by: Jack Cutting; Clyde Geronimi
- Based on: "The Ugly Duckling" by Hans Christian Andersen
- Produced by: Walt Disney
- Starring: Clarence Nash (Note: Duck sounds)
- Music by: Albert Hay Malotte
- Animation by: Milt Kahl; Eric Larson; Milt Neil; Stan Quackenbush; Archie Robin; Paul Satterfield; Riley Thomson
- Layouts by: David Hilberman
- Color process: Technicolor
- Production company: Walt Disney Animation Studios
- Distributed by: RKO Radio Pictures
- Release date: April 7, 1939
- Running time: 8:59
- Country: United States
- Language: English

The Ugly Duckling (re-titled as Ugly Duckling in reissues) is a Silly Symphonies animated short film produced by Walt Disney, based on the 1843 fairy tale "The Ugly Duckling" by Hans Christian Andersen. The film was directed by Jack Cutting and Clyde Geronimi, and released in theaters on April 7, 1939. Music was composed by Albert Hay Malotte, who was uncredited for the film. The animated short was first distributed by RKO Radio Pictures, and was shown with Love Affair.

An earlier Silly Symphony animated short based on this fairy tale had been produced in black and white in 1931. The 1939 color film won the 1940 Oscar for Best Short Subject (Cartoons), and also happened to be the last entry in the Silly Symphonies series, although it was branded in certain releases as a special one-shot short.

In the Andersen tale, a cygnet is harassed because of his homeliness. To his delight, he matures into a swan, the most beautiful bird of all, and his troubles are over. In this version, the baby swan's sufferings are shortened, as he is found by his family after only a few minutes of rejection and ostracism instead of a whole year.

== Plot ==
An expectant mallard duck father is pacing by his wife's side. Suddenly, the mother duck's eggs begin to hatch, much to the father's delight, giving birth to four little ducklings. But then, a fifth egg hatches, revealing a mismatched white duckling. The father argues with the mother over this, forcing the two to go their separate ways after she slaps him.

The ugly duckling attempts to join the duck family, but they turn their backs on him, after which he discovers how different he is from them. The duckling attempts to join a family of bluebirds, but while the young birds accept him, the mother drives him off. He encounters a wooden duck that he adopts as his new mother before its head collides with him. He escapes to the safety of a bank where he sees the wooden duck turn its back on him. Thinking that he will never find a family, he breaks down in tears. A mother swan and her cygnets approach him. The mother swan extends her arm in love, and he joins the family.

As the swan family swims by, they pass by the mother duck and her ducklings, who recognize the cygnet. The cygnet proudly poses and swims off with his true family.

== Comic adaptation ==
The Silly Symphony Sunday comic strip ran a month-long adaptation of The Ugly Duckling from March 26 to April 16, 1939.

== Reception ==
The Film Daily wrote: "The Hans Christian Andersen fairy tale translated to cartoon language emerges a delight to the ear and the eye... Though the story concerns only the feathered folk, this Disney short is fused with real feeling and pathos."

== Home media ==
The short was released on December 4, 2001 on Walt Disney Treasures: Silly Symphonies - The Historic Musical Animated Classics. It was included on the DVD release in the United States, Germany, France, Italy, Sweden, and the United Kingdom. It is also available on Disney+ with restored Silly Symphony title cards.

== See also ==
- The Ugly Duckling (1931 film)
- Lambert the Sheepish Lion
- List of Disney animated shorts
