= Walt Disney's Story Land: 55 Favorite Stories =

Walt Disney's Story Land: 55 Favorite Stories is a series of books published over the years from 1962-1999 by Golden Press.

== 1962 edition ==
Walt Disney's Story Land: 55 Favorite Stories Adopted from Walt Disney films
- First edition
- Author: The Walt Disney Company
- Language: English
- Genre: Children's literature
- Publisher: Golden Press
- Publication date: 1962
- Publication place: United States
- Media type: Print (hardcover)
- Pages: 320
- ISBN: 978-0-307-16547-3

These 55 stories were either adapted from the Walt Disney's movies or original. All of the material was previously published as either separate individual books by Golden Press/Simon & Schuster or books by other publications that the publishers had access to. The previous versions are listed in ().

1. Bambi (Big Golden Book, 1949, Melvin Shaw)
2. Hiawatha (Little Golden Book, 1953)
3. Donald Duck, Private Eye (Little Golden Book, 1961, Carl Buettner, illustrations by AI White)
4. Toy Sailboat (Little Golden Book, 1954, Annie North Bedford and illustrations by Samuel Armstrong)
5. Bongo (Big Golden Book, 1947, illustrations by Edgar Starr)
6. Pedro (Golden Book Walt Disney's Treasure Chest, 1948, Dick Kelsey & Dick Moores)
7. Snow White and the Seven Dwarfs (Golden Book compilation, Walt Disney's Treasury: 21 Best-Loved Stories, 1953, Jane Werner Watson a.k.a. Annie North Bedford, illustrations by Campbell Grant, Dick Kelsey & Dick Moores)
8. Once Upon a Wintertime (Little Golden Book, 1950, illustrations by Tom Oreb)
9. Chip n' Dale at the Zoo (Little Golden Book, 1954, Annie North Bedford, illustrations by Bill Bosche)
10. The Sorcerer's Apprentice (Walt Disney's Treasure Chest, 1948)
11. Perri (Big Golden Book, 1957, Emily Broun, illustrations by Dick Kelsey)
12. The Grasshopper and the Ants (Walt Disney's Treasure Chest, 1948, Margaret Wise Brown, illustrations by Dick Kelsey & Dick Moores)
13. The Adventures of Mr. Toad (Giant Golden Book, 1949, John Hench)
14. The Orphan Kittens (D. C. Heath and Company book Little Pig's Picnic And Other Stories, 1939, Margaret Wise Brown)
15. Pilgrim's Party (D. C. Heath and Company book Mickey Sees The U.S.A., 1944, Caroline D. Emerson)
16. Ben and Me (Walt Disney's Treasury: 21 Best-Loved Stories, 1953, illustrations by Campbell Grant, Dick Kelsey & Dick Moores)
17. Goliath II (Little Golden Books, 1959, Bill Peet)
18. The Lonely Little Colt (D. C. Heath and Company book Little Pig's Picnic And Other Stories, 1939, Margaret Wise Brown)
19. Dumbo of the Circus (Walt Disney's Treasury: 21 Best-Loved Stories, 1953, illustrations by Dick Kelsey)
20. Paul Revere (inspired by film Johnny Tremain; Little Golden Books, 1957, Irwin Shapiro, illustrations by Paul Luhrs)
21. Alice in Wonderland Meets the White Rabbit (Little Golden Book, 1951, Jane Werner Watson a.k.a. Annie North Bedford, illustrations by Al Dempster)
22. Donald Duck, Prize Driver (Little Golden Book, 1956, Annie North Bedford, illustrations by Neil Boyle)
23. Goofy, Movie Star (Little Golden Book, 1956, Annie North Bedford, illustrations by Samuel Armstrong)
24. Babes in Toyland (Little Golden Book, 1961, Barbara Shook Hazen, illustrations by Earl & Carl Marshall)
25. Forest Friends (based on Snow White and the Seven Dwarfs; previously part of the D. C. Heath and Company book Water Babies' Circus And Other Stories, 1940)
26. The Flying Mouse (D. C. Heath and Company book Little Pig's Picnic And Other Stories, 1939, Margaret Wise Brown)
27. Through the Picture Frame (Little Golden Book, 1944, Robert Edmonds adapted from Hans Christian Andersen)
28. The Runaway Lamb (an excerpt from So Dear to My Heart, previously published as a Grosset & Dunlap book Runaway Lamb At The County Fair, 1949, Sterling North, illustrations by Julius Svendsen)
29. Grandpa Bunny (an excerpt from Funny Little Bunnies; Little Golden Book, 1951, Jane Werner Watson (Annie North Bedford), illustrations by Bill Justice & Dick Kelsey)
30. The Ugly Duckling (Little Golden Book, 1952, illustrations by Don MacLaughlin; Walt Disney's Treasury: 21 Best-Loved Stories, 1953, illustrations by Dick Kelsey & Dick Moores)
31. Uncle Remus/De Tar Baby (Giant Golden Book, 1946, illustrations by Al Dempster & Bill Justice; Little Golden Book, 1947, illustrations by Bob Grant)
32. Elmer Elephant (Walt Disney's Treasure Chest, 1948)
33. Lady and the Tramp (Walt Disney's Treasury: 21 Best-Loved Stories as a pre-release "Lady", 1953, illustrations by Dick Kelsey & Dick Moores, and Big Golden Book, 1955, illustrations by Claude Coats)
34. Scamp (Little Golden Book, 1957, Annie North Bedford, illustrations by Norm McGary & Joe Rinaldi)
35. Donald the Explorer (based on Polar Trappers; D.C. Heath & Co. book Donald Duck And His Friends, 1939, Jean Ayer)
36. Mrs. Cackle's Corn (based on The Wise Little Hen; previously published as part of a Thomas Nelson & Sons book Mickey And His Friends, 1937, Jean Ayer)
37. Mickey Mouse and Pluto Pup (Little Golden Book, 1953, Elizabeth Beecher, illustrations by Campbell Grant)
38. Pigs Is Pigs (Walt Disney's Treasury: 21 Best-Loved Stories, 1953, illustrations by Dick Kelsey & Dick Moores)
39. Peter Pan (Walt Disney's Treasury: 21 Best-Loved Stories, 1953, illustrations by Dick Kelsey & Dick Moores)
40. Cinderella (Big Golden Book, 1950, Jane Werner Watson a.k.a. Annie North Bedford, illustrations by Retta Scott Worcester)
41. Mickey Mouse Goes Christmas Shopping (Little Golden Book, 1953, Annie North Bedford, illustrations by Bob Moore)
42. Pluto Pup Goes to Sea (Little Golden Book, 1952, Annie North Bedford, illustrations by Yale Gracey)
43. Davy Crockett, King of the Wild Frontier (Little Golden Book, 1955, Irwin Shapiro, illustrations by Mel Crawford)
44. Darby O'Gill (Little Golden Book, 1959, Annie North Bedford, illustrations by David Gantz)
45. The Old Mill (D.C. Heath & Co. book Little Pig's Picnic And Other Stories, 1939, and Walt Disney's Treasure Chest, 1948, illustrations by Dick Kelsey & Dick Moores)
46. Johnny Appleseed (Little Golden Book, 1949, Ted Parmalee)
47. The Grand Canyon (D. C. Heath and Company book Mickey Sees The U.S.A., 1944, Caroline D. Emerson)
48. Beaver and His Brothers (D. C. Heath and Company book Water Babies' Circus And Other Stories, 1940, Georgiana Brown)
49. Peter and the Wolf(Walt Disney's Treasury: 21 Best-Loved Stories, 1953, illustrations by Dick Kelsey & Dick Moores)
50. Brave Little Tailor (Walt Disney's Treasure Chest, 1948)
51. 101 Dalmatians (Big Golden Book, 1961, Carl Buettner, illustrations by Norman McGary & Sylvia Mattinson)
52. Sleeping Beauty (excerpted from "The Sleeping Princess" section of Walt Disney's Treasury: 21 Best-Loved Stories, 1953, illustrations by Frank Armitage, Walter Peregoy, Dick Kelsey & Dick Moores; also one image from the Big Golden Book version published in 1957, while the film was in production, Julius Svendsen)
53. Three Little Pigs (Little Golden Book, 1948, AI Dempster & Milt Banta)
54. The Country Cousin (Walt Disney's Treasure Chest, 1948)
55. Pinocchio (Walt Disney's Treasury: 21 Best-Loved Stories, 1953, illustrations by Campbell Grant, Dick Kelsey & Dick Moores)

== 1987 edition ==
In addition to a new cover, this update eliminated a few titles from the 1962 version to include a few more titles, including:

- Donald Duck's Toy Train (a Little Golden Book, 1950, illustrations by Dick Kelsey)
- Mickey's Christmas Carol (Little Golden Book, 1983, illustrations by Ron Dias)
- Goofy's Buried Treasure (Annie North Bedford, illustrations by Samuel Armstrong)
- Mickey Mouse's Picnic (Little Golden Book, 1950, Jane Werner Watson a.k.a. Annie North Bedford).

== 1991/1996/1999 editions ==
More changes were made to the 1987 version in order to include the latest feature film successes of the 1980s and early 1990s. In addition, several older favorites were replaced by more recent Golden Book versions, also listed below in ().

1. Bambi (Big Golden Book, 1984, illustrations by Ron Dias)
2. Little Hiawatha
3. Donald Duck's Toy Train
4. Toy Sailboat
5. Bongo
6. Pedro
7. Snow White and the Seven Dwarfs (newer version illustrated by Ron Dias)
8. Once Upon a Wintertime
9. Chip n' Dales's Book of Seasons (First Little Golden Book, 1989, Cindy West, illustrations by Paul Edwards)
10. The Sorcerer's Apprentice
11. Perri
12. The Grasshopper and the Ants
13. The Adventures of Mr. Toad
14. The Orphan Kittens
15. Mickey's Christmas Carol
16. Ben and Me
17. Goliath II
18. The Lonely Little Colt
19. Dumbo (Little Golden Book, 1988, Teddy Slater Margulies, illustrations by Ron Dias & Annie Guenther)
20. Paul Revere
21. Alice in Wonderland Meets the White Rabbit
22. Donald Duck, Prize Driver
23. Goofy's Buried Treasure
24. Oliver Finds a Home (an excerpt from Oliver and Company) (Golden Look-Look Book, 1988, Justine Korman)
25. Beauty and the Beast (Golden Look-Look Book, 1991, Michael Teitelbaum, illustrations by Serge Michaels)
26. The Flying Mouse
27. Ariel's Underwater Adventure (an excerpt from The Little Mermaid) (Little Golden Book, 1989, Michael Teitelbaum, illustrations by Ron Dias)
28. The Runaway Lamb
29. Grandpa Bunny
30. The Ugly Duckling
31. Uncle Remus/Tar Baby
32. Elmer Elephant
33. Lady and the Tramp (Little Golden Book, 1988, Teddy Slater Margulies, illustrations by Ron Dias & Bill Langley)
34. Scamp
35. Donald the Explorer
36. Mrs. Cackle's Corn
37. Winnie the Pooh and the Missing Bullhorn (Little Golden Book, 1990, Michael Teitelbaum, illustrations by Russell Schroeder & Don Williams)
38. Pigs Is Pigs
39. Peter Pan (Little Golden Book, 1989, illustrations by Ron Dias)
40. Cinderella
41. Mickey Mouse Goes Christmas Shopping
42. Cowboy Mickey (Little Golden Book, 1990, Cindy West, illustrations by Guelle)
43. Davy Crockett, King of the Wild Frontier
44. Darby O'Gill
45. The Old Mill
46. Johnny Appleseed
47. Mickey Mouse's Picnic
48. Happy Sailing, Mickey Mouse (Golden Look-Look Book, 1989, Cindy West, illustrations by Frank Mateu)
49. Peter and the Wolf
50. Mickey and the Beanstalk (Little Golden Book, 1988, Dina Anastasio, illustrations by Sharon Ross)
51. 101 Dalmatians
52. Sleeping Beauty (Little Golden Book, 1986, illustrations by Ron Dias)
53. Three Little Pigs
54. The Country Cousin
55. Pinocchio (Little Golden Book, 1990, illustrations by Ron Dias)
