= The Robber Kitten =

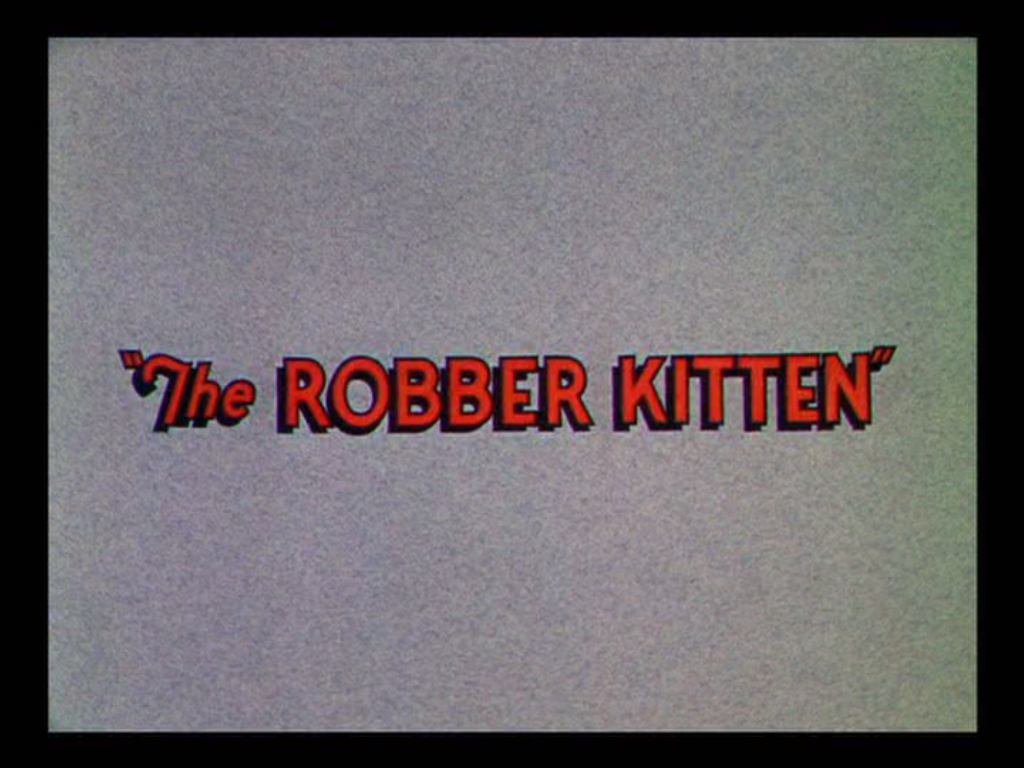
- Directed by: David Hand
- Story by: William Cottrell
- Produced by: Walt Disney
- Starring: Shirley Reed; Billy Bletcher; Clarence Nash; Elvia Allman
- Music by: Frank Churchill
- Animation by: Bob Wickersham; Marvin Woodward; Hardie Gramatky; Hamilton Luske; Bill Roberts
- Color process: Technicolor
- Production company: Walt Disney Productions
- Distributed by: United Artists Pictures
- Release date: April 20, 1935
- Running time: 7:48
- Country: United States
- Language: English
- Budget: $23,153

The Robber Kitten is a 1935 Walt Disney produced Silly Symphonies animated short film, directed by David Hand. The short is based on a story of the same name written by Robert Michael Ballantyne with the pseudonym Comus.

== Plot ==
A kitten named Ambrose is dreaming about running away and becoming a robber. Calling himself "Butch" at the beginning of the cartoon, he is seen play-acting a stagecoach robbery, which is interrupted by his mother calling for him to take a bath. Not wanting to take a bath in the first place, Ambrose runs away and becomes a robber, first stealing a bag of cookies. His first target turns out to be an actual robber: Dirty Bill the bulldog. Believing Ambrose to also be a robber, Dirty Bill strikes up a brief friendship with the kitten and asks him if he has pulled off any robberies lately; Ambrose manages to impress him by making up a false story about having successfully robbed a stagecoach earlier. When Dirty Bill asks Ambrose the loot he supposedly stole, Ambrose shows Dirty Bill the bag of cookies. Believing the cookie bag to actually contain gold, Dirty Bill demands it and threatens Ambrose. Scared, Ambrose drops his cookie bag (surprising and confusing Dirty Bill when he discovers the cookies inside), runs home and jumps into his bathtub, acting as if nothing else has happened.

== Production ==
Story development started around September of 1934, taking inspiration from a short story made by Robert Micheal Ballantyne. Originally, the name of the robber kitten was going to be "Ferdinand". Animation on the film later started in October 9 of 1934, with a small team of animators that frequently made most of the Silly Symphonies in one small team (examples include Three Orphan Kittens, Elmer Elephant) where over time expanded with the newly employed animators at the studio. A list of which animators made each scene is listed down below:

- Bob Wickersham: Ambrose until going down the stairs
- Marvin Woodward: Ambrose's mother and Ambrose running back home
- Hardie Gramatky: Ambrose stealing cookies and leaving home
- Ham Luske: Entire Dirty Bill sequence until flashback
- Bill Roberts: Flashback of Ambrose robbing a stagecoach

Animation then ended on February 19 of 1935, which after the cels were painted to finally be photographed in 3-strip Technicolor. Photography lasted only 15 days from 5-20 of March of the same year, which was edited and developed in under a week until finally being delivered for movie theatres.

== Comic adaptation ==
The cartoon short was adapted in a Silly Symphony comic strip sequence by Ted Osborne and Al Taliaferro, which ran from February 24 to April 21, 1935. The storyline was titled "The Adventures of Ambrose the Robber Kitten". It was also translated and published in Austria (1938), Australia, Belgium (1952), Brazil (1979), Finland (1935), France (1935), Germany (2003), United Kingdom (1936), Italy (1935), Spain (1935), and Yugoslavia (1936).

== Voice cast ==
- Ambrose: Shirley Reed
- Dirty Bill: Billy Bletcher
- Horse whinny, Ambrose's Tarzan yell: Clarence Nash
- Ambrose's mother: Elvia Allman

== Home media ==
The short was released on December 4, 2001, on Walt Disney Treasures: Silly Symphonies - The Historic Musical Animated Classics.

It was also released on the Walt Disney Animation Collection: Classic Short Films Volume 5: Wind in the Willows DVD in 2009.
