= Orphan's Benefit =

1934, 1941 Mickey Mouse cartoon

- Theatrical release poster
- Directed by: Burt Gillett
- Produced by: Walt Disney
- Starring: Walt Disney; Florence Gill; Clarence Nash; Pinto Colvig
- Music by: Frank Churchill
- Animation by: Johnny Cannon; Les Clark; Norm Ferguson; Ward Kimball (inbetweener); Dick Lundy; Dick Williams (assistant)
- Production company: Walt Disney Productions
- Distributed by: United Artists
- Release date: August 11, 1934
- Running time: 9 minutes
- Country: United States
- Language: English

Orphan's Benefit is an American animated short film produced by Walt Disney Productions in black-and-white. It was first released in 1934 and was later remade in Technicolor in 1941 under the corrected title Orphans' Benefit. It was the 68th Mickey Mouse short film to be released, and the sixth of 1934. The cartoon features Mickey Mouse and his friends putting on a vaudeville-style benefit show for a group of unruly orphans. It contains a number of firsts for Disney, including the first time in which Mickey Mouse and Donald Duck appear together. It was also the cartoon which had the first story to be written that featured Donald Duck, though it was the second Donald Duck short to be produced and released, after The Wise Little Hen.

Orphans' Benefit features original music composed by Frank Churchill. The voice cast includes Walt Disney as Mickey, Clarence Nash as Donald, and Florence Gill as Clara Cluck. The original cartoon was directed by Burt Gillett and distributed by United Artists while the remake was directed by Riley Thomson and distributed by RKO Radio Pictures.

== Plot ==
At a local theater, Mickey Mouse holds a benefit performance for the mice orphans. As they file into the building, they are given free lollipops, ice cream, and balloons.

For the first act, Donald Duck recites "Mary Had a Little Lamb" and "Little Boy Blue", but when he says, "come blow your horn", the orphans disrupt the performance by loudly blowing their noses. A frustrated Donald challenges them to fight but is pulled backstage.

For the second act, Goofy, Horace Horsecollar, and Clarabelle Cow perform an acrobatic dance. Horace dances with Clarabelle and Goofy tries catching her but gets his head stuck. Goofy throws Clarabelle back to Horace. Horace spins Clarabelle around and throws her in Goofy's direction. Goofy catches her dress, pulling it off as she flies past, and Clarabelle hits Goofy on the head. Later, Donald once again recites "Little Boy Blue" and blows his own horn before the orphans can respond. The orphans blow ice cream at Donald and punch him into a daze with their boxing gloves.

For the third act, Clara Cluck performs "Chi mi frena in tal momento" from Act II of Gaetano Donizetti's Lucia di Lammermoor, accompanied by Mickey on piano. Eventually, an orphan fires a slingshot from behind her to help finish the song.

Donald begins his final set by reciting "Little Boy Blue" yet again, but when he says "Where is that boy who looks after the sheep?" the orphans respond "Under the haystack fast asleep, you dope!" to Donald's frustration. The orphans tie bricks, a plant, a fire extinguisher and eggs onto their balloons, float them over his head, and fire their slingshots. After being laughed at by the orphans, Donald finally accepts defeat.

== Firsts ==
Donald Duck's first appearance in a Mickey Mouse film.

Orphans' Benefit was the first appearance of Donald Duck in a Mickey Mouse series film, marking the characters' first joint appearance. Donald had previously appeared only in a Silly Symphonies film.

Although Orphans' Benefit was Donald's second appearance, the film was the first to significantly develop his character. Many of Donald's personality traits first seen in Orphans' Benefit would become permanently associated with him, such as his love of showmanship, his fierce determination, belligerence, and most famously his easily provoked temper. The film also introduced some of Donald's physical antics, such as his signature temper tantrum of hopping on one foot while holding out one fist and swinging the other. This was the creation of animator Dick Lundy, who termed this Donald's "fighting pose".

Orphans' Benefit also represented a new direction for Disney cartoons, according to Disney historian Marcia Blitz: "It can be seen that the framework of Orphan's Benefit was traditionally slapstick. Audiences laughed at Donald's physical mishaps, much as they laughed at Chaplin's or Keaton's. But in this instance there was the added dimension of Donald's abrasive personality. Surely nothing like it had ever been seen in a cartoon". Animator Ward Kimball who worked on the film called it a "turning point" for the studio, citing its extensive use of character animation which was used to physically convey personality.

The later Disney film Mickey's Amateurs (1937) was directly inspired by Orphans' Benefit. Both films feature stage shows with various acts interspersed with Donald attempting to recite a nursery rhyme.

The film was also the debut of Clara Cluck, who would go on to appear in six other cartoon shorts.

== Reception ==
The response of audiences to the film, particularly Donald's character, led to the duck being featured more in future cartoons. Ward Kimball said "the reaction [to Orphans' Benefit] that came pouring into the studio from the country was tremendous. The kids in the theater loved or hated or booed Donald Duck".

== Voice cast ==
- Mickey Mouse: Walt Disney
- Donald Duck: Clarence Nash
- Clara Cluck: Florence Gill
- Goofy: Pinto Colvig

== Remake ==
Orphans' Benefit
- Theatrical release poster
- Directed by: Riley Thomson
- Produced by: Walt Disney
- Animation by: Jim Armstrong; Johnny Cannon; Chester Cobb; Ed Love
- Color process: Technicolor
- Production company: Walt Disney Productions
- Distributed by: RKO Radio Pictures
- Release date: August 22, 1941
- Running time: 9 minutes

In the summer of 1939, in anticipation of Mickey Mouse's 12th anniversary the following year, Walt Disney commissioned a two-reel short film tentatively called Mickey's Revival Party. The plan was for this film to show the characters attending a theater where they would watch scenes from several old, mostly black and white Mickey Mouse films (among them Orphans' Benefit). The story artists envisioned the characters humorously interacting with themselves on the movie screen. This required the old animation footage to be redrawn completely rather than added in its original state.

It was during this process that Walt Disney decided to completely reproduce several of these old shorts in color. It was also an opportunity to update the character models in Technicolor, since many characters had changed in appearance since the early 1930s, such as Mickey and the orphans' eyes gaining scleras and Donald's duckbill changing shape.

Orphans' Benefit was the first of these films to be remade. The result was an almost exact shot-for-shot version of the original, with added color and redrawn characters and backgrounds. The film was directed by Riley Thomson and used almost the entire original soundtrack, the only change being the final line, from "Aw nuts!" to "Aw phooey!" which had become a catchphrase for Donald by that time. Orphans' Benefit was released to theaters on August 12, 1941, by RKO Radio Pictures.

The next film scheduled for reproduction was Mickey's Man Friday (1935), but it was never completed. The original concept for Mickey's Revival Party was shelved, and Orphans' Benefit became the only Disney film to be recreated scene for scene. It is unknown what led to the cancellation, although animation historian David Gerstein speculated that Disney's World War II propaganda (such as Der Fuehrer's Face, Education for Death, and Victory Through Air Power) or the Disney animators' strike of 1941 may have played a role, or that Walt Disney simply preferred to work on all-new films rather than "extensively revisit the past".

== Historical notes ==
Donald's recitation of "Mary Had a Little Lamb" was inspired by Clarence Nash's own recitation of the poem on the radio, a performance he had intended to sound like a nervous baby goat. It was largely because of this performance that Nash was hired by Disney to voice the duck.

Donald impersonates the comedian Jimmy Durante when he says, "Am I mortified! Am I mortified!" His bill even changes shape to make fun of Durante's famous nose. The joke was not as noticeable in the remake because Donald's bill keeps its shape.

In 1989, an animation cel from the original Orphans' Benefit, depicting Donald being punched by an orphan, sold for $286,000 (then £174,390) at a Christie's auction in New York. Guinness World Records confirmed this was the most money ever paid for a black and white animation cel.

== Adaptations ==
In 1968, Disneyland Records released an abridged audio-only version of Orphans' Benefit on the album Mickey Mouse and his Friends as the track "Mickey's Big Show". The album was re-released in 2010 as a digital download on Amazon MP3 and the iTunes Store.

In October 1973, the story was adapted into a 13-page comic book story in the Italian publication "Cartonatoni Disney" #14. The story was called Recita di Beneficenza, or Benefit Recital. The same year an English version was published in the American comic book "Walt Disney Magic Moments" #1, called The Orphans' Benefit.

== Releases ==
Original

- 1934 - original theatrical release
- 1954 - Disneyland, episode #1.4: "The Donald Duck Story" (TV)

Remake

- 1941 - original theatrical release
- c. 1983 - Good Morning, Mickey!, episode #18 (TV)
- 1997 - The Ink and Paint Club, episode #1.10: "Mickey, Donald & Goofy: Friends to the End" (TV)

== Home media ==
The original was released on December 2, 2002, on Walt Disney Treasures: Mickey Mouse in Black and White.

The remake was released on May 18, 2004, on Walt Disney Treasures: Mickey Mouse in Living Color, Volume Two: 1939-Today.

Additional releases of the remake include:

- 1987 - "Cartoon Classics: Here's Mickey!" (VHS)
- 2006 - "Extreme Music Fun" (DVD)

== See also ==
- Mickey Mouse (film series)
