= The Ugly Duckling (1931 film) =

1931 film by Wilfred Jackson

- Directed by: Wilfred Jackson
- Based on: "The Ugly Duckling" by Hans Christian Andersen
- Produced by: Walt Disney
- Starring: Florence Gill
- Music by: Frank Churchill; Bert Lewis
- Color process: Black and white
- Production company: Walt Disney Productions
- Distributed by: Columbia Pictures
- Release date: December 16, 1931
- Running time: 7 min
- Country: United States
- Language: English

The Ugly Duckling is a 1931 American animated short film directed by Wilfred Jackson. It is the 25th film of the Silly Symphonies series. This cartoon was later remade into a color version released in 1939, which follows the original Andersen story much more faithfully.

== Plot ==
A hen is asleep when her eggs hatch. Six female chickens hatch to her delight, but the last egg reveals a duckling who has gotten mixed in among the farmyard chickens. The hen and the chicks walk away from him. Despite the duckling's best attempts to fit in with his chick sisters, things don't work out. He tries to go to a dog, a cow and even a frog, but to no avail, leaving him to lament his "ugliness" after he mocks his reflection. Soon, the cow's mooing informs everyone to take shelter at once because there's a tornado coming their way. The hen and the chicks quickly run inside the hen house, but the duck has to go under the home due to them not accepting him.

When the hen's chicks are threatened by a waterfall, due to them being dropped off in a river after the hen house was caught up in the tornado, the little duckling swims to the rescue having gone through various debris to get to them. The hen cries out in fear for her daughters' lives. The duck gets into the hen house, but once the first tree gets through, the duck and his chick sisters are on it. He quickly tells them to run back in the hen house, saving them and a second tree comes through destroying it. This time, the duck orders his sisters to run to the fireplace blower, which he jumps on a few times to take them to safety. He is lauded as a hero by his sisters. The hen picks the duckling up, recognizing him as her son and hugs him to his delight.

== Home media ==
The short was released on December 4, 2001, on Walt Disney Treasures: Silly Symphonies - The Historic Musical Animated Classics.

== See also ==
- The Ugly Duckling (1939 film)
