= Farmyard Symphony =

- Directed by: Jack Cutting
- Story by: Erdman Penner; Vernon Stallings
- Produced by: Walt Disney
- Starring: Melvin J. Gibby; Beatrice Hagen; Dorothy Lloyd; Lee Millar; Victor Rodman; Lee Sweetland; Max Terhune; Billy Bletcher; Florence Gill; Clarence Nash
- Music by: Leigh Harline
- Layouts by: Arthur Heinemann; David Hilberman
- Color process: Technicolor
- Production company: Walt Disney Productions
- Distributed by: RKO Radio Pictures
- Release date: October 14, 1938
- Country: United States
- Language: English

Farmyard Symphony is a 1938 Silly Symphonies animated short film. It can be seen as a precursor to Fantasia due to using various pieces of classical music in one short. The film was directed by Jack Cutting and produced by Walt Disney.

An adaptation of the short was featured in the Silly Symphony comic strip over six weeks, from October 23 to November 27, 1938, around the time of the film's theatrical release. While the short doesn't have much of a story, the comic adaptation expands on a running gag involving a piglet looking for food, giving one of the piglets distinctive markings and a name (Spotty), and turns the gag into a short narrative. Spotty Pig also appeared in a nine-page story in the Silly Symphonies comic book issue #2 (1953).

== Plot ==
Set to various classical pieces, the animals of a farmyard go about their daily business. The highlight is a rooster wooing a white hen, with the other animals joining in until they hear a sound more welcoming to them: the call of feeding time.

=== Pieces included ===
In order of appearance, the film includes the following pieces and arias:

- Third movement (Allegro) from Symphony No. 6 "Pastoral", by Ludwig van Beethoven and Overture to The Merry Wives of Windsor by Otto Nicolai - played under the opening credits and in the very first scene.
- First and third part from William Tell Overture by Gioacchino Rossini - starting when the bull is waking up.
- Overture from The Barber of Seville, by Rossini - foal waking up and piglets eating.
- Allegretto grazioso (Op. 62, No. 5) from Songs Without Words by Felix Mendelssohn, popularly known as "Spring Song" - played while the calf and the foal chase each other.
- "Garryowen" - while the geese are marching.
- Overture to Semiramide, by Rossini - during the rooster's strut and when he wakes up the chickens.
- "La donna è mobile" from Rigoletto by Giuseppe Verdi - "clucked" by the rooster and the white hen; this metamorphoses into a variation of "Miserere" from Act 1 of Il trovatore, also by Verdi, when all the other animals join in.
- Final part ("March of the Swiss Soldiers") of William Tell overture, by Rossini, going into Hungarian Rhapsody No. 2 by Franz Liszt - while the animals are eating.
- "Tannhäuser" Overture, by Wagner - ending scene, Spotty eating corn.

In addition to the above pieces, the film features a few excerpts adapted by Leigh Harline from traditional tunes (such as the one to which "Chick, chick, chick, chick..." is sung by the peasant woman), as well as original orchestral passages of his, which have no classical source.

== Voice cast ==
- Rooster and pullet: Florence Gill
- Ducks, geese, chicks: Clarence Nash
- Bull: Billy Bletcher
- Farmer: Lee Sweetland
- Birds: Dorothy Lloyd
- Mule: Lee Millar
- Farmer's Wife: Beatrice Hagen
- Animals: Melvin J. Gibby, Victor Rodman, Max Terhune

== Home media ==
The short was released on December 4, 2001, on Walt Disney Treasures: Silly Symphonies - The Historic Musical Animated Classics, as an Easter egg in the "Accent on Music" section. Prior to that, the featurette also appeared on the Walt Disney Cartoon Classics Limited Gold Edition: Silly Symphonies VHS in the 1980s. It is also a bonus on the Make Mine Music DVD.
