= The Ocean Hop =

1927 film by Walt Disney

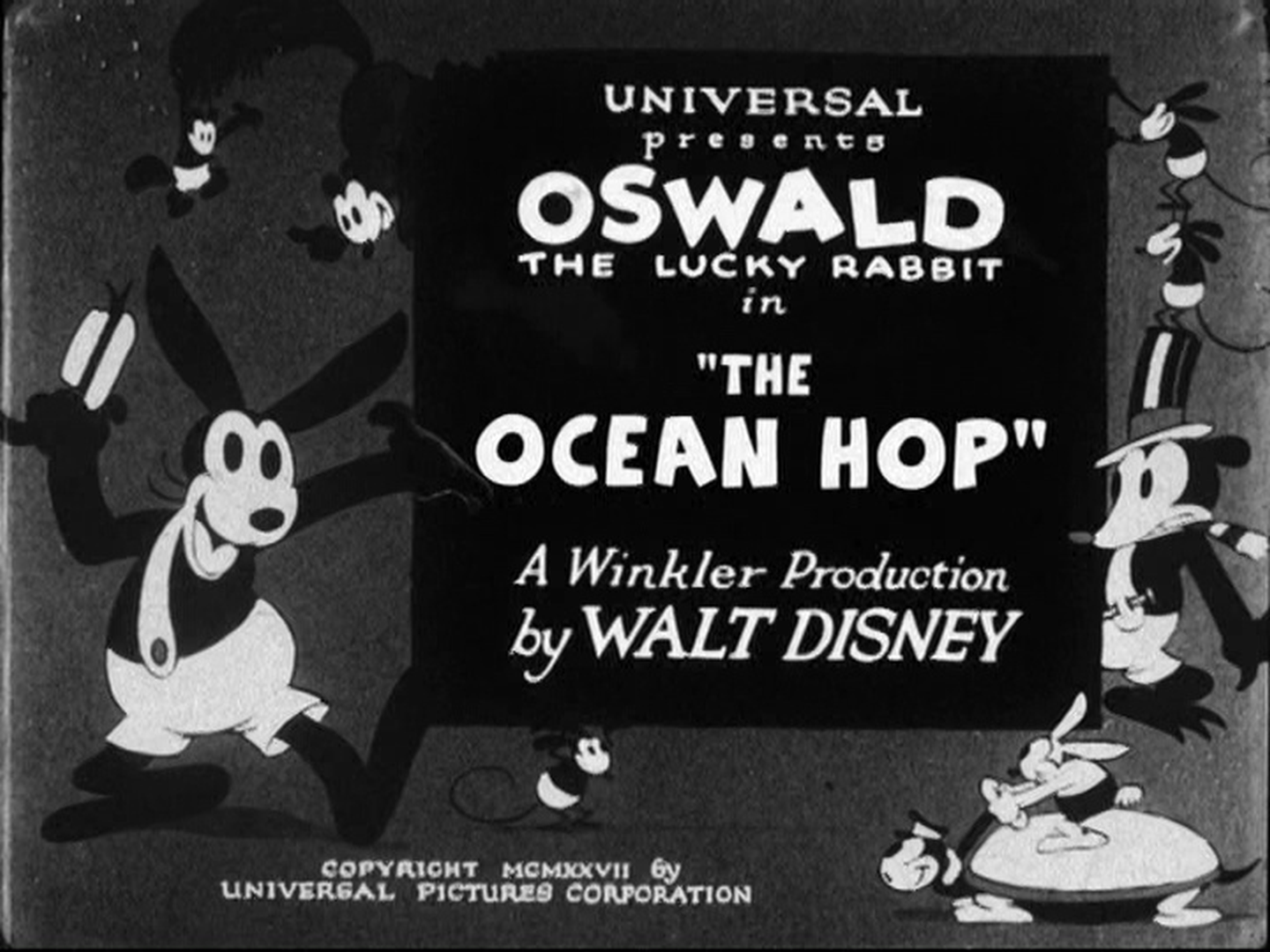
- Title card
- Directed by: Walt Disney
- Story by: Walt Disney
- Produced by: Charles Mintz; George Winkler
- Animation by: Hugh Harman; Ben Clopton; Rollin Hamilton; Ub Iwerks
- Color process: Black-and-white
- Production company: Winkler Pictures
- Distributed by: Universal Pictures
- Release date: November 14, 1927
- Running time: 6:39
- Country: United States

The Ocean Hop is a 1927 American animated comedy short film directed by Walt Disney. The film was reissued in 1932 by Walter Lantz Productions with added music and sound effects and is the only known surviving version. The short entered the public domain in 1955 due to the copyright not being renewed. It is the first appearance of Peg Leg Pete in the series.

== Plot ==
The short from 1927.

Oswald the Lucky Rabbit enters into an airplane race across the Atlantic Ocean. While there he encounters a mean rival, Peg Leg Pete, who taunts him and causes his plane to get glued to the ground with chewing gum. As Peg Leg Pete takes a lead, Oswald manages to construct a plane of balloons and a long dachshund dog. While at first managing to put up a good effort, Oswald is eventually shot down by Peg Leg Pete over Paris. After parachuting into Paris, Oswald is welcomed by the local patrons as he ended up winning the race.

== Home media ==
After The Walt Disney Company acquired the rights to the short, it was released on December 11, 2007, on Walt Disney Treasures: The Adventures of Oswald the Lucky Rabbit.
