= Pete (Disney) =

Disney cartoon character, antagonist of Mickey Mouse

- Alice Comedies / Oswald the Lucky Rabbit / Mickey Mouse & Friends character
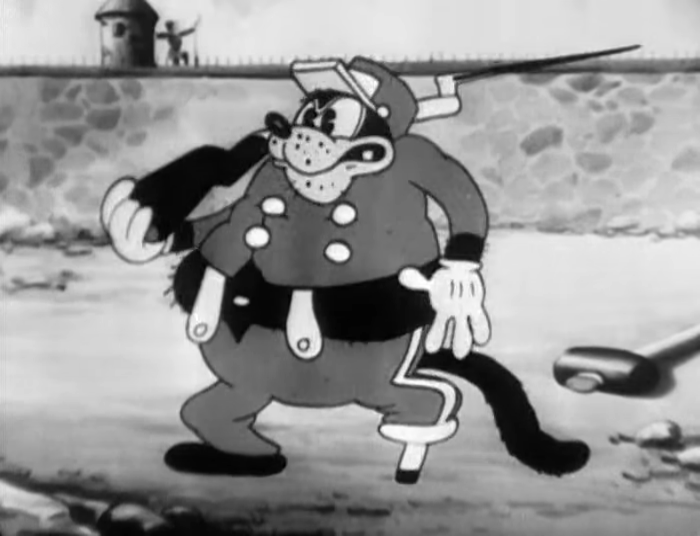
- Pete in The Chain Gang (1930)
- First appearance: Alice Solves the Puzzle (February 15, 1925)
- Created by: Walt Disney; Ub Iwerks
- Designed by: Walt Disney; Ub Iwerks; Norm Ferguson
- Voiced by: Walt Disney (1928–1929); Billy Bletcher (1934 (Note: Bletcher stated in an interview that he was first hired by the Disney studio to voice the Big Bad Wolf for The Three Little Pigs (1933). The earliest cartoon where Pete is clearly voiced by Bletcher is Shanghaied (1934).)–1960); Will Ryan (1983–1992, 2013); Arthur Burghardt (The Prince and the Pauper; 1990, video games; 2001–2003); Jim Cummings (1992–present)
- Full name: Peter Pete Sr.
- Aliases: Captain Blackheart, Louie the Leg, Pierre the Trapper, Peg-Leg Pedro, Percy P. Percival, Sylvester Macaroni, Terrible Tom, Tiny Tom, Tom Cat
- Nicknames: Bad Pete, Big Pete, Big Bad Pete, Black Pete, Bootleg Pete, Dirty Pete, Mighty Pete, Pee Wee Pete, Peg Leg Pete, Petey, Pistol Pete, Sneaky Pete, Piston Pete
- Species: Anthropomorphic Bear (1925 - 1928) Anthropomorphic cat (1928 - present day)
- Gender: Male
- Spouse: Peg (Goof Troop)
- Significant others: Trudy Van Tubb (Italian comics); Chirpy Bird (1980s comics)
- Children: Peter "P.J." Pete Jr. (son, Bellboy Donald, Goof Troop, A Goofy Movie and An Extremely Goofy Movie); Pistol Pete (daughter, Goof Troop)
- Relatives: Maw Pete (mother); Grandpa Pete (father, Goof Troop); Li'l Pete (brother); Zeke (twin brother); Petula (sister); Mabel (aunt); Portis (cousin); Zeke (cousin); Jimbo (nephew); Pierino and Pieretto (nephews)
- Nationality: American

Pete (also named Peg Leg Pete, (Note: Sometimes also spelled as "Peg-Leg Pete" or "Pegleg Pete".) Bad Pete, and Black Pete, among other names) is a cartoon character created by Walt Disney and Ub Iwerks of The Walt Disney Company. Pete is traditionally depicted as the villainous arch-nemesis of Mickey Mouse, and was made notorious for his repeated attempts to kidnap Minnie Mouse. Pete is the oldest continuing Disney character, having debuted in the cartoon Alice Solves the Puzzle in 1925. He originally bore the appearance of an anthropomorphic bear, but with the advent of Mickey in 1928, he was defined as a cat.

Pete appeared in 67 animated short films between 1925 and 1954, having been featured in the Alice Comedies and Oswald the Lucky Rabbit cartoons, and later in the Mickey Mouse, Donald Duck, and Goofy cartoons. During World War II, he played the long-suffering sergeant trying to make a soldier out of Donald Duck in a series of animated shorts.

Pete's final appearance during this era was The Lone Chipmunks (1954), which was the final installment of a three-part Chip 'n' Dale series. He also appeared in the featurettes Mickey's Christmas Carol (1983) and The Prince and the Pauper (1990), the feature films A Goofy Movie (1995), An Extremely Goofy Movie (2000), Mickey's Once Upon a Christmas (1999), and Mickey, Donald, Goofy: The Three Musketeers (2004), and the short film Get a Horse! (2013).

Pete has also made many appearances in Disney comics. He appeared as Sylvester Shyster's dimwitted sidekick in the early Mickey Mouse comic strips before evolving into the main antagonist. In the Italian comics production he has been given a girlfriend, Trudy, and has come to be the central character in some stories. Pete later made several appearances in television, most extensively in Goof Troop (1992–1993) where he was given a different continuity, having a family and a regular job as a used car salesman and being a friend (albeit a poor one) to Goofy. He reprises this incarnation in 1999's Mickey's Once Upon a Christmas. Pete also appears in House of Mouse (2001–2003) as the greedy property owner who is always trying to exploit devious ways and loopholes to get the club shut down.

Although Pete is often typecast as a villain, he has shown great versatility within the role, playing everything from a hardened criminal (The Dognapper, The Lone Chipmunks and most of his depictions in comics) to a legitimate authority figure (Moving Day, Donald Gets Drafted, Mr. Mouse Takes a Trip), and from a menacing trouble maker (Building a Building, Trombone Trouble) to a victim of mischief himself (Timber, The Vanishing Private). On some occasions, Pete has even played a sympathetic character, all the while maintaining his underlying menacing nature (Symphony Hour, How to Be a Detective). In the animated TV series Mickey Mouse Clubhouse, which is aimed at preschoolers, he is largely a friendly character, although his antics can occasionally prove an annoyance.

== Theatrical cartoons ==
=== Alice Comedies ===
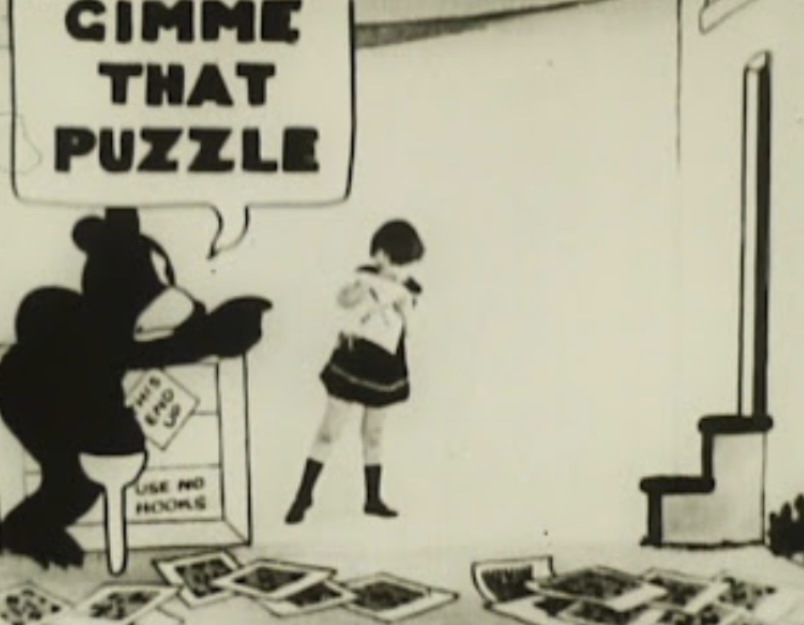
Pete's first appearance in Alice Solves the Puzzle

Pete first appeared in the Walt Disney-produced 1920s Alice Comedies short subject series.

He first appeared in Alice Solves the Puzzle (February 15, 1925) as Bootleg Pete. His nickname was a reference to his career of bootlegging alcoholic beverages during Prohibition in the United States (1920-1933). In the cartoon, Pete's activities bring him to a beach in time to see Alice working on a crossword puzzle. Pete happens to be a collector of crossword puzzles, and identifies Alice's puzzle being a rare one missing from his collection. The rest of the short focuses on his antagonizing Alice and her drunken cat Julius to steal it.

In various later Alice Comedies, the character again battled and competed with Alice and Julius, often under the aliases Putrid Pete and Pegleg Pete.

=== Oswald the Lucky Rabbit ===
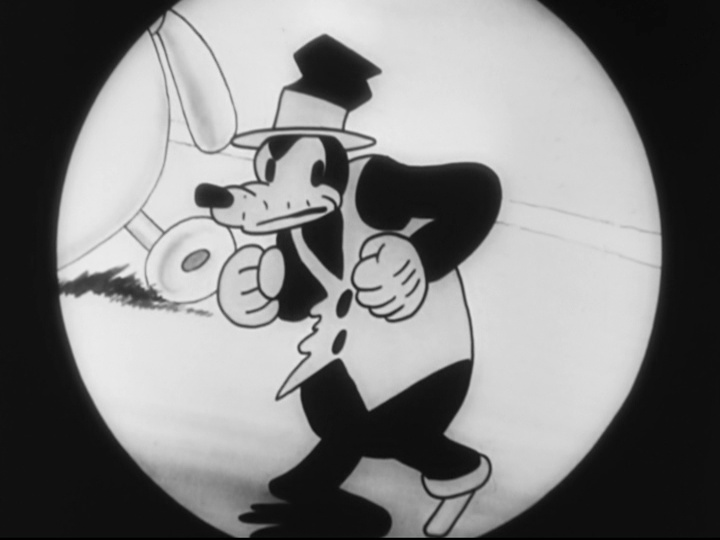
Peg Leg Pete in The Ocean Hop

Disney needed a villain to place against his new star Oswald the Lucky Rabbit, and Pete was introduced to his new adversary in the sixth Oswald short The Ocean Hop (September 8, 1927). Apparently inspired by Charles Lindbergh, the two enter an aeroplane race across the Atlantic Ocean. By the time producer Charles Mintz moved production of the Oswald series to his own studio after Disney's departure, Pete had been established as the most consistently appearing supporting character to Oswald, and the character continued to appear in that role in the Oswald films produced by Walter Lantz Productions until 1937, making him essentially the only cartoon character at the time to frequently appear in shorts produced by two rival animation studios. His most notable non-Disney appearance was as a captain in Permanent Wave (September 29, 1929).

=== Mickey Mouse and friends ===
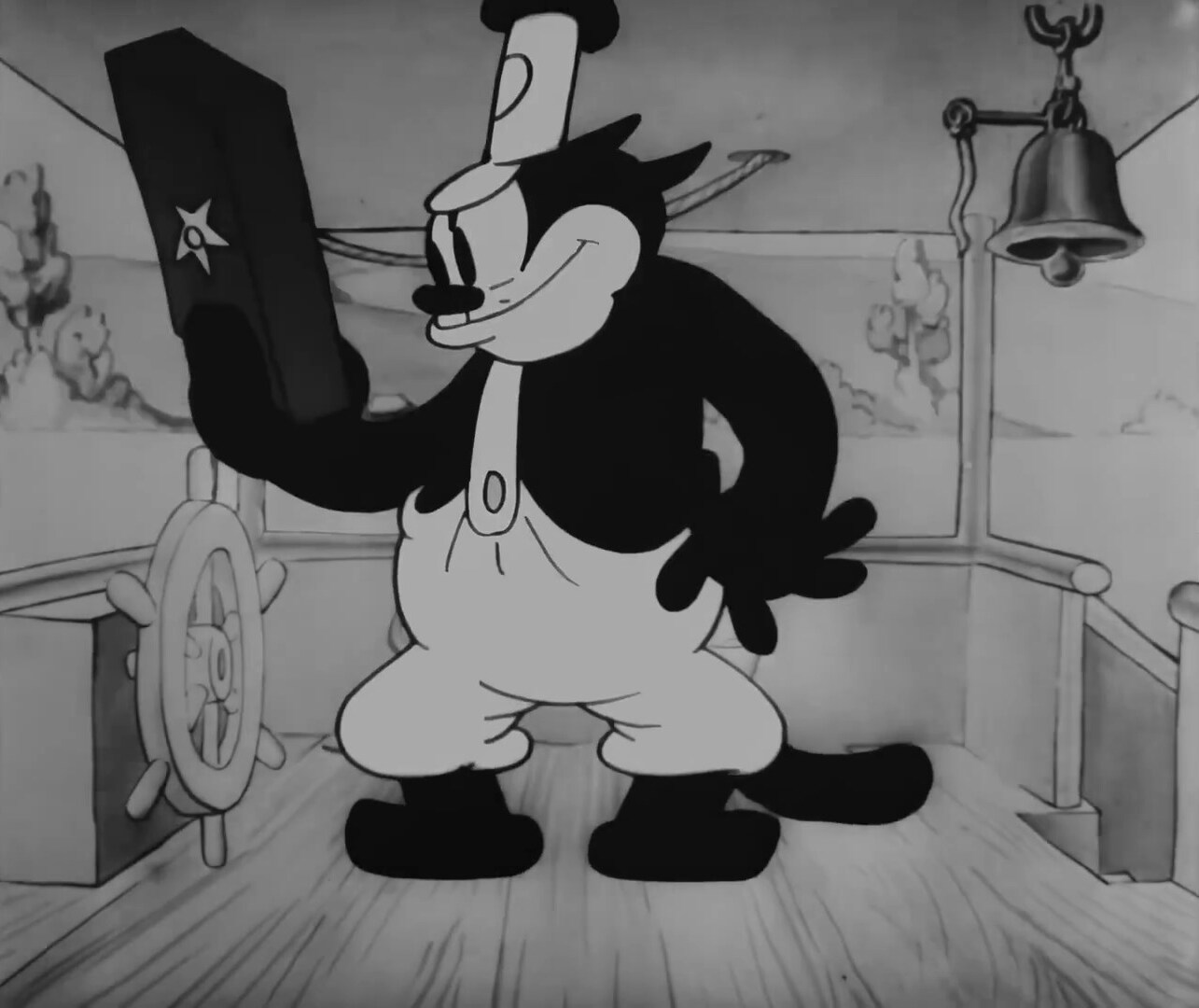
Pete as he appeared in Steamboat Willie (1928)

After leaving the Oswald series, Disney and his team created a cat villain for their new protagonist Mickey Mouse. Originally unnamed in the cartoons and called "Terrible Tom" in a January 1930 comic strip, the villain was called Pegleg Pete by April 1930, formalizing him as a new incarnation of the pre-Mickey bad guy. Animator Norm Ferguson, known for developing Pluto, also developed Pete's character in several shorts and he was made to resemble actor Wallace Beery. Pete appeared as Mickey's enemy beginning with the 1928 cartoons The Gallopin' Gaucho and Steamboat Willie. While he was seen with two legs in those films, he first appeared with a peg-leg in 1930's The Cactus Kid and would speak for the first time. He would first appear in color in Moving Day (1936), which would drop the peg-leg. In the cartoons of the 1930s, Pete would be Mickey Mouse's nemesis, but would vary in professions, from an all-out outlaw (Gallopin' Gaucho, The Cactus Kid, Two-Gun Mickey) to a brutal law-enforcer (Moving Day, where Pete is a sheriff who serves Mickey and Donald Duck with an eviction notice). In the 1942 cartoon Symphony Hour, Pete is a sympathetic impresario who sponsors Mickey's orchestra in a concert, which goes terribly wrong but is a great success. As Mickey's popularity declined, Pete would serve as an antagonist for Donald Duck and to a lesser extent Goofy and Chip 'n' Dale. In the 1940s, Pete would play the role of Donald's drill sergeant in several war-themed shorts (eg. Donald Gets Drafted, The Old Army Game)

== Comics ==
In Disney comics, Pete is consistently depicted as a professional criminal, who often teams up with Mickey Mouse enemies Sylvester Shyster, Eli Squinch, or the Phantom Blot.

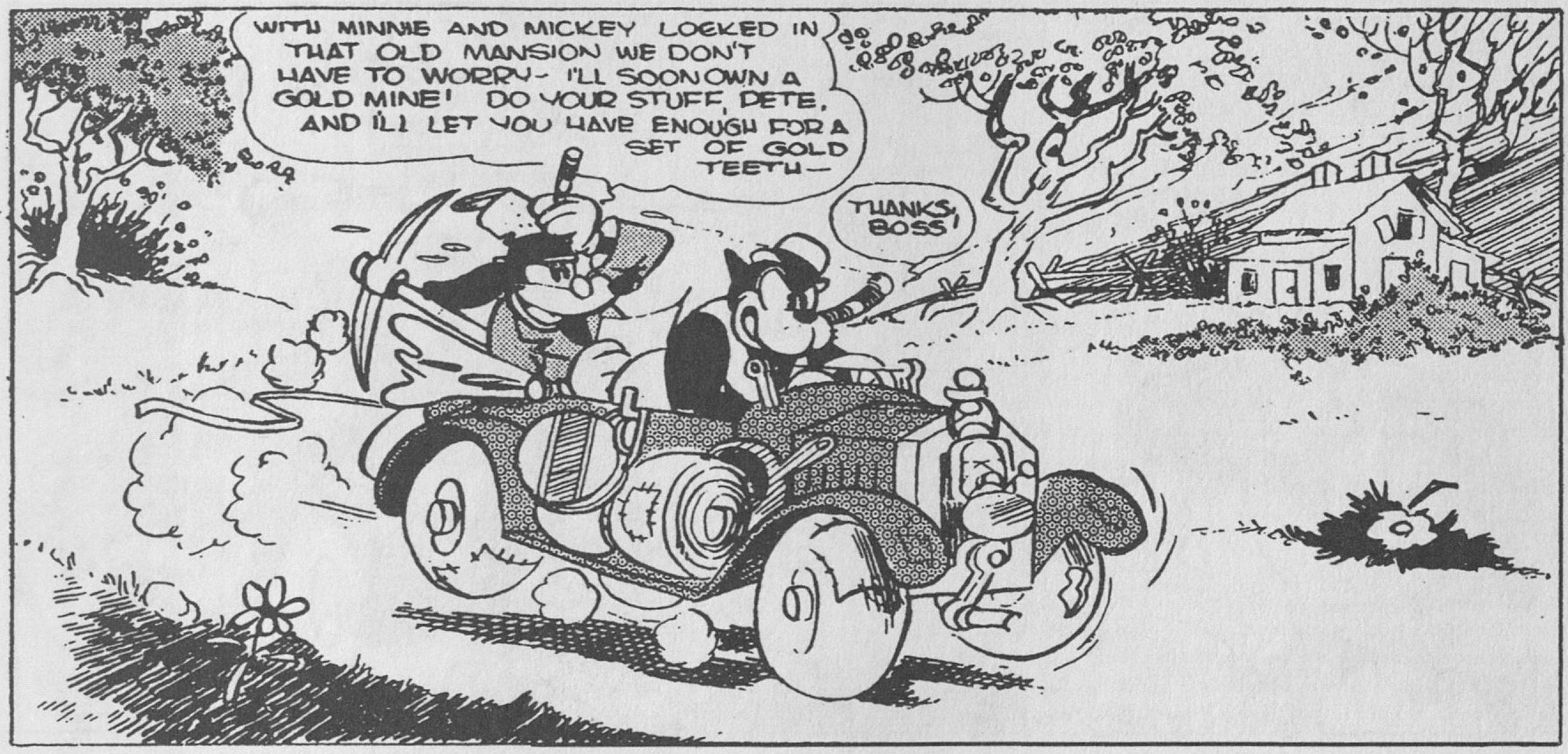
Pete (right) driving a car with Sylvester Shyster in the Mickey Mouse comic strip dated May 13, 1930

In a promotional strip for the Mickey Mouse comic strip in early 1930, he was announced as "Terrible Tom – The Vile Villain", but this name was never used afterwards. In the April 24, 1930 strip, Mickey refers to him as "Pegleg Pete", and the name sticks. Pete first appeared in the Mickey Mouse comic strip on April 21, 1930, in the story "Mickey Mouse in Death Valley". This appearance is the first time since the Alice Comedies that Pete has a pegleg. Floyd Gottfredson occasionally committed goofs, with the pegleg switching from Pete's right leg to his left one. In the August 26, 1930 strip, Pete's peg swaps from right to left between one panel to the next. Pete's pegleg also appears on the left in the July 11 strip, and for the week of September 3 to 9. In Gottfredson's story "The Mystery at Hidden River" (1941–42), the pegleg disappeared, with Pete having two normal legs: when Mickey expressed surprise at this, Pete described one of his legs as a new, "streamlined, modern" artificial leg.

In 1944, Walt Disney decided to retire the character from the shorts; comics historian Alberto Becattini writes that this was "partly because he was concerned that it seemed to be a case of mocking the afflicted, partly because the animators could never remember which leg was the wooden one." Pete also left the comic strip for a few years; his last appearance was in "The World of Tomorrow", which ran from July to September 1944.

However, Pete continued to appear in the comic books – in 1945, he was the heavy in the Donald Duck comic "Frozen Gold" (Four Color #62, January 1945) and in Mickey's "The Riddle of the Red Hat" (Four Color #79, August 1945). He surfaced again in a number of "giveaway" comics in 1946 and 1947 – "Mickey's Christmas Trees" (Donald and Mickey Merry Christmas, 1946), "Donald and the Pirates" (Cheerios Premium #W1, 1947), "Mickey Mouse and the Haunted House" (Cheerios Premium #W4, 1947), "Mickey Mouse at the Rodeo" (Cheerios Premium #X4, 1947), "Mickey Mouse's Helicopter" (Boys and Girls March of Comics Giveaway #8, 1947) – and came back to the comic books in "Mickey Mouse and the Submarine Pirates" (Four Color #141, March 1947).

With Pete still appearing in comic books, Gottfredson brought him back to the comic strip in "Pegleg Pete Reforms" (March 1947). His last appearance in the strip was in "The Isle of Moola-La" (April–October 1952). From then on, he made many more appearances in the comic books.

In Mickey Mouse in Death Valley and in several subsequent storylines, Pete was portrayed as Sylvester Shyster's henchman. From 1934, he gradually started to work on his own. Sometimes, Pete also teams up with other bad guys in the Disney universe, such as Scrooge McDuck's enemies (the Beagle Boys and Magica De Spell), Mad Madam Mim, Captain Hook, and the Evil Queen. In various comics stories, his right-hand man is a skinny, bearded criminal named Scuttle. In Italian comics, his girlfriend Trudy (Trudy Van Tubb) is his frequent partner-in-crime. His cousin the "mad scientist" Portis is another, less frequent, accomplice.

In the 1943 comic strip story Mickey Mouse on a Secret Mission, he was an agent of Nazi Germany, working as the henchman of Gestapo spy Von Weasel. In the 1950 comic strip story The Moook Treasure, he is even portrayed as the Beria-like deputy chief of intelligence in a totalitarian state on the other side of the Iron Curtain.

His name in Italy has remained "Pietro Gambadilegno" ("Pegleg Peter"), or simply "Gambadilegno" ("Pegleg") even though it has been a long time since he was actually depicted with a pegleg in either comics or animated cartoons. In an Italian story by Romano Scarpa, "Topolino e la dimensione Delta" ("Mickey Mouse and the Delta Dimension", first published in 1959), Pete briefly removes his artificial leg, revealing his old foot-high pegleg underneath. Usually, Gambadilegno is depicted as the antagonist of Chief Seamus O'Hara ("commissario Adamo Basettoni") and Detective Casey ("ispettore Manetta") and is either a rival or a partner-in-crime of the Phantom Blot ("Macchia Nera").

Pete returned in the 2013 short Get a Horse!, and was animated as having a peg left leg.

== World War II ==
Black Pete: USMM World War II Mascot.

During World War II, Pete was "drafted" by Walt Disney and appeared as the official mascot of the United States Merchant Marine. He appeared in Donald Duck's series of army films where he plays Donald's Drill Sergeant and later Sergeant and Jumpmaster. In the Mickey Mouse comic strip, he was a spy for Nazi Germany in the episode Mickey Mouse on a Secret Mission (1943), his motivation being the money.

== Ancestry and family ==
Comic book stories have depicted Pete as being descended from a long line of villains, highwaymen and outlaws. Even historical figures such as Attila the Hun, Blackbeard, Antonio López de Santa Anna, Billy the Kid, and Cao Cao have been included among his ancestors. His mother is known only as Maw Pete and was mentioned in the story "Donald Duck Finds Pirate Gold" by Carl Barks and Jack Hannah (first published October 1942) as a resident of Pittsburgh, Pennsylvania. Her only appearance was in "The River Pirates" (Walt Disney's Comics and Stories #336–338, published September–November 1968) by Carl Fallberg and Paul Murry. The same story introduced Li'l Pete, Black Pete's short fraternal twin brother. In December 1998, the Mickey Mouse comic strip introduced an older sister of Pete. Petula is the television host of the cooking show Petula's Pantry. She finds time, however, to seek revenge against Mickey for condemning her "baby brother" to life imprisonment. Pete's twin brother, named Zeke appears in "Double Trouble", by Carl Fallberg and Paul Murry.

Better-known and more enduring as characters are two figures created by Romano Scarpa for Italian Disney comics. The first, Trudy Van Tubb, was introduced in Topolino e la collana Chirikawa (published in English as The Chirikawa Necklace, first published on March 10, 1960). This female partner of Pete was presented as a childhood acquaintance of his: they are even shown as kids kidnapping Mickey when he was a baby. However, Trudy soon became Pete's girlfriend, his partner-in-crime and roommate—whenever they hold residence out of prison, that is. Their relationship seems to have evolved to a long-standing common-law marriage. This is occasionally used in contrast to Mickey's eternal engagement to Minnie Mouse and Goofy's determination to remain a bachelor. Trudy and Pete also have two hellion nephews named Pierino and Pieretto who often serve as foils for Mickey or Mickey's nephews Morty and Ferdie.

The second character to be created by Scarpa is Pete's cousin, the criminal scientist Portis (Plottigat in the original Italian version; English name first used in Walt Disney's Comics and Stories 695, 2008). Portis first appeared in Topolino e il Pippo-lupo (published in English as The Weregoof's Curse; January 9, 1977).

Ed Nofziger is responsible for a third recurring character, an alternative girlfriend of Pete named Chirpy Bird. She first appeared in Topolino e i piccioni "poliziotti" (Mickey Mouse and the Pigeon Police, first published in December 1981) and starred as Pete's partner-in-crime in eight stories from 1981 to 1984. In France, she and Trudy are presented as the same character, being both renamed Gertrude, despite Trudy being a cat and Chirpy being a canary.

In Mickey Mouse Works, Pete has another cousin named Zeke. Zeke is a criminal like Pete, but is wary of his cousin's attempts to double-cross him "Just like old Times". Mickey often uses this distrust to turn the two against one-another.

In Goof Troop, Pete has a wife, Peg, and two children, PJ and Pistol. Alternatively, the comic book story "Mickey's Strange Mission" from Walt Disney's Comics & Stories #245 (1961, by Carl Fallberg and Paul Murry) suggests a cultured ancestry for Pete, giving his full name as the genteel Percy P. Percival.

In Mickey Mouse Mixed-Up Adventures, Pete has a nephew named Jimbo, who is voiced by Fred Stoller.

In the Italian comic story of 1998, Topolino e il diario di zia Topolinda (Mickey Mouse and Aunt Melinda's diary), Pete's grandma appears, depicted as the only honest member of his family.

== Television ==
=== DuckTales ===
In the first season of the 1987 TV series DuckTales, Pete appeared in a few episodes. However, he was portrayed as a different character in each of his appearances. Because of this, he was not always a true villain, but sometimes just a selfish individual with no evil agenda. In a few episodes, he even makes peace with Scrooge's group in the end. The various Petes appear to be their own characters, as two of them lived in different time periods, and because Scrooge never "recognizes" him, despite any previous encounters he may have had with any of the other Petes. In all of his appearances Pete was voiced by Will Ryan.

Episode	Character
"Duck in the Iron Mask"	Captain Pietro
"Time Teasers"	Captain Blackheart
"Merit-Time Adventure"	Dogface Pete
"Pearl of Wisdom"	Sharkey

=== Goof Troop ===
In the 1992 TV series Goof Troop, Pete has a family who includes his wife Peg, their two children Pete Junior (or PJ for short) and Pistol, and their dog Chainsaw with Pete taking on a more canine-like appearance. They live next door to Goofy (who went to high school with Pete) and his son Max. In the series, Pete is often the victim of Goofy's clumsiness and mishaps, usually resulting in the destruction of his property or great personal injury. Pete owns a used-car dealership, and though no longer openly villainous, is still conniving (as well as abrasive, obnoxious, truculent and suspicious) and often exploits his good-hearted and somewhat addled friend Goofy. Often, his schemes backfire, or he feels guilty about his oafish behavior and works to set things right. His wife Peg often attempts to rid Pete of his uncouth attitude, and his son PJ is a complete opposite of his father in behavior, as he is good friends with Goofy's son Max in the series and its spin-off movies A Goofy Movie (1995) and An Extremely Goofy Movie (2000). It is eventually revealed in the series' pilot episode "Forever Goof" that one of the reasons why Pete dislikes Goofy so much is that when Pete was a high school quarterback in a big football game, it was Goofy who accidentally caused Pete to fumble the ball and lose the game by hitting him in the face with a pom pom (Goofy was on the cheerleading squad).

=== Mickey Mouse Works and House of Mouse ===
After Goof Troop, Pete reverted to his evil ways on Mickey Mouse Works, where he frequently bullied the other characters and occasionally kidnapped Minnie Mouse. He would also play an average criminal (i.e. a house burglar). Then in House of Mouse, he plays the role of the evil landlord. Several episodes involved his attempts to close the club by sabotaging the show, though there were times when he helped out the crew.

=== Mickey Mouse Clubhouse ===
Pete appears in numerous episodes of Mickey Mouse Clubhouse. He maintains his protagonist and semi-antagonist role, but is significantly toned down for its preschool audience—he is less malicious and more mischievous.

=== Mickey Mouse Mixed-Up Adventures ===
Pete also appears in Mickey Mouse Mixed-Up Adventures as a recurring character, either competing against Mickey and friends in races or as a civilian in various locales. He is also the proprietor of Pete's Junkyard.

The series also features various alter egos and/or relatives of Pete:

- Piston Pietro in "Race for the Rigatoni Ribbon" is an Italian race car driver.
- El Toro Pete in "Running of the Roadsters?" is a Spanish bullfighter.
- Pau Hana Pete, Pineapple Patty, Pu Pu Platter Pete and Puhi Pete in "It's Wiki Tiki Time" are Pete's Hawaiian relatives.
- Sir Lord Pete in "Ye Olde Royal Heist" is a British dancing star and thief.
- Beefeater Pete in "Tea Time Trouble!" is a member of the Queen's Guard.
- Captain Peterson in "The Happiest Helpers Cruise!" is the captain of the harbor cruise.
- Peteroni Leone in "Lights, Camera, Help!" is a film director.
- Hunchback Pete in "Cuckoo in Paris" is a Quasimodo-like inhabitant of Notre-Dame de Paris.
- Pancho Pete in "Super-Charged: Daisy's Grande Goal" is the Brazilian teammate of Panchito Pistoles, Jose Carioca, and Daisy's cousin Almanda de Quack in a Roadster soccer team called the Brazilian Borboletas.
- Colonel Pete in "Meet the Beagles" is the manager of the Beagles.

"The Iron Mouse" episode reveals that Pete has an nephew named Jimbo (voiced by Fred Stoller). In addition, some episodes feature his mother Mama Pete (portrayed by Elayne Boosler).

=== Mickey Mouse & The Wonderful World of Mickey Mouse ===
Pete appears in the 2013 Mickey Mouse cartoon series, and its 2020 spin-off The Wonderful World of Mickey Mouse. In both shows, he is designed based on his appearances in the early Mickey Mouse cartoons, complete with a peg-leg.

=== Mickey Mouse Funhouse ===
Pete appears in Mickey Mouse Funhouse. The Adventure Worlds contain various counterparts of Pete.

- Farmer Pete is a farmer who lives in Majestica.
- Cowboy Pete is a cowboy who lives in Sunny Gulch.
- Pete the Mighty is a demigod hero and emperor of the Land of Myth and Legend.
- Powerhouse Pete is a top baseball player in Sportstopia who leads the Pete's Palookas baseball team.
- Octopete is a octopus-legged version of Pete who lives in Underwater Ocean World.
- Mayor Franken-Pete is a Frankenstein's monster-like mayor of Halloweenville. He speaks in the style of Boris Karloff.
- Asteroid Pete resides in outer space and is the proprietor of Asteroid Pete's Fun Center.
- Polyphonic Pete resides in Musicville.
- Piccolo Pete is an old friend of Mickey Mouse who resides in the Adventure Sea Islands.

=== Mickey Mouse Clubhouse+ ===
Pete appears in the Mickey Mouse Clubhouse revival series Mickey Mouse Clubhouse+. He is seen with several alter-egos, with some of them appearing as the episode's Mystery Mousekepal.

- Tow Truck Pete in "Clarabelle's New Coop" is a tow truck driver and the episode's Mystery Mousekepal. He helps to change the flat tire on Clarabelle Cow's wheelbarrow.
- Pasta Pete in "Mickey's Dinner Party" is a pasta chef and the episode's Mystery Mousekepal. He assists Minnie in making macaroni.
- Farmer Pete in "Daisy Can't Say" is a farmer who is the owner of a frog named Buster.
- Snow Cone Pete in "Say Cheese" is a snow cone vendor and the episode's Mystery Mousekepal. He gives Mickey's group snow cones while they are doing a photo op in the desert.
- Space Pete in "Martian Mickey's Clubhouse" is an outer space counterpart of Pete who runs a fast food space restaurant that is between Earth and Mars.
- Picture Pete in "Mickey's Movie Night" is the proprietor of "Picture Pete's Drive-In Movie Theatre".
- Chef Pete in "The Late Late Show" is a chef and the episode's Mystery Mousekepal. He makes peanut butter and jellybean sandwiches at Goofy's request so that everyone can stay up to see the meteor shower.

== Feature films and featurettes ==
=== Mickey's Christmas Carol ===
In the 1983 short film Mickey's Christmas Carol, an adaptation of Charles Dickens' novel A Christmas Carol featuring Disney characters, Pete was cast as the Ghost of Christmas Yet to Come.

=== The Prince and the Pauper ===
In this Disney version of Mark Twain's The Prince and the Pauper, Pete once again played as the primary villain, this time as the English king's captain of the guard. When he saw that his ruler's life was slowly diminishing, he and his henchmen, a band of anthropomorphic weasels (from The Wind in the Willows) who now act as the king's guards, seized the opportunity to terrorize England's citizens and rob them of their goods in "favor" of the king. After kicking out a disguised Prince, whom he mistook for the peasant boy Mickey Mouse, out of his kingdom, he later receives word from one of his guards that the Prince was seen a causing a commotion in the village, as the guard claimed that he "acted like a nobleman and he had the royal ring!" Pete suddenly realizes that it was indeed the Prince he "booted out" and seizes another opportunity out of this. That night, after the king passes away, Pete finds the "phony prince" (Mickey), threatening the life of his dog, Pluto, unless Mickey follows his commands. In the village, he soon finds and captures the real Prince and takes him to the castle's dungeon to lock him up. On the day of the Prince's coronation, Pete plots to get Mickey crowned as king, though Mickey is still subservient to Pete's orders. His plan, however, is thwarted when the Prince suddenly appears in the throne room, having busted out of the dungeon and evading the guards with the help of Goofy (Mickey's peasant friend) and Donald Duck (the Prince's valet). A sudden battle in the throne room (Mickey and the Prince vs. Pete; Goofy and Donald vs. the Weasel Guards) results in Pete's defeat, as Goofy's bumbling antics cause a chandelier to fall on the weasels, bundle them together, and send them rolling towards Pete. Pete, seeing this, tries to flee but is slowed down by his ripped-down pants (courtesy of the Prince's swashbuckling skills) and tripped by both the Prince and Mickey, causing him to get rolled over and caught on the chandelier, which sends him and his men rolling through a stained glass window and falling out of the castle.

=== A Goofy Movie and An Extremely Goofy Movie ===
Pete later appeared in A Goofy Movie (1995) and its sequel, An Extremely Goofy Movie (2000), where he was still snooty and somewhat cankerous at times; despite this, he is shown in a much lighter tone as these movies are based on Goof Troop. He is Goofy's best friend and always confidant in the films.

=== Mickey's Once Upon a Christmas ===
In the 1999 direct-to-video film Mickey's Once Upon a Christmas, Pete appears in the story "A Very Goofy Christmas" as Goofy's neighbor, being responsible for making Max stop believing in Santa Claus by telling him that his existence is impossible. Later he appears in the story "Mickey and Minnie's Gift of the Magi" as Mickey's boss selling Christmas trees.

=== The Three Musketeers ===
In the 2004 made-for-video animated film The Three Musketeers (with Mickey, Donald Duck, and Goofy playing the title roles), Pete again appeared under the name Peg-Leg Pete. He served as the main antagonist of the film. Here, he was the Captain of the Musketeers, aiming to take over France, with the help of his lieutenant, Clarabelle Cow, and the Beagle Boys. To do so, he must get Princess Minnie out of the way, but it proves to be difficult for him, even when he hires the film's titular trio to be her bodyguards, believing they will not do a good job protecting her. He received his own "bad guy song", using the classic music piece In the Hall of the Mountain King.

=== Other film appearances ===
Pete made a non-speaking cameo appearance during the finale of the 1988 film Who Framed Roger Rabbit as a Toontown police officer.

In the 2002 direct-to-video film Mickey's House of Villains, Pete and other Disney villains' guest appearances from House of Mouse are featured. He takes part in the musical number "It's Our House Now" when villains take over the club.

Pete made a cameo appearance in the 2022 film Chip 'n Dale: Rescue Rangers, where he is seen on a filming set for a bootleg film version of Aladdin.

=== Parodies ===
Pete appears briefly in the episode "Who Ate Wally's Waffles?" of the series Paradise PD at the entrance of Disney World as one of the employees of the park.

== Video game appearances ==
- Pete appears as a boss in Mickey's Dangerous Chase.
- Pete appears as a boss in the English version of Mickey Mousecapade, replacing Captain Hook from the Japanese version.
- In Adventures in the Magic Kingdom for the NES, Pete (referred to as "Panhandle Pete") steals one of the keys needed to unlock the castle and challenges the player character to a race on the Autopia attraction to get it back. Pete is only depicted in cut scenes, with the "race" itself more of a timed obstacle course featuring other cars with indistinct drivers.
- In Disney's Magical Quest, a trilogy by Capcom, Pete is the final boss of each game, personating a distinct ruler (Emperor, Baron and King). He serves as an evil ruler who terrorizes the land he reigns and often kidnaps another character. In Disney's Magical Quest 1, he kidnaps Pluto; in Disney's Magical Quest 2, he appears as the tyrant "Baron Pete" who commands the game's enemies; in Magical Quest 3, he kidnaps Donald's nephews. Mickey and, depending on the game, Minnie or Donald, are always set to defeat him. In the end of the first game he simply disappears when he is defeated. In the second game, he is sealed inside his own crystal ball which Mickey throws into the distance. In Magical Quest 3, however, after being defeated by Mickey and Donald, he eventually surrenders and promises to become a good person.
- Quackshot follows the adventures of Donald Duck as he, with the aid of his three nephews Huey, Dewey and Louie, sets out to obtain some treasure from a map he found. Pete appears as an antagonist near the end of the game, kidnapping Donald's nephews and demanding to be given the map, and must be fought immediately prior to the final stage and boss of the game.
- Mickey Mania follows Mickey Mouse, who has been catapulted back in time to his earliest appearance in Steamboat Willie. Black Pete is Mickey's archvillain throughout the entire game, all the way from his first confrontation against Mickey in Steamboat Willie to his role in The Prince and the Pauper.
- In the racing game Mickey's Speedway USA, Pete is a heavyweight racer, but gets replaced when the players selects between Ludwig Von Drake or Huey, Dewey and Louie.
- Pete appears as the main antagonist in Magical Tetris Challenge. In the game, his goal is to obtain ultimate power from Donald's mysterious purple stone, having a Weasel and the Big Bad Wolf as his henchmen.
- Pete appears as an unlockable playable character in Disney Think Fast.
- Pete is the final boss in World of Illusion, a character who owns a giant magical box and sets the challenge to any victims who fall into it to traverse surreal terrains and then to defeat him for escape.
- In Legend of Illusion Starring Mickey Mouse, Pete is an incompetent king who passes his kingship to the laundry boy, Mickey and eventually fights him as a final boss to regain his throne.
- Pete appears as the main antagonist in Goofy's Hysterical History Tour. In the game, he is janitor in Ludwig Von Drake's museum and he wants to get his co-worker Goofy fired from job and sabotages the exhibits and scatters pieces throughout various time periods. Pete is the boss of each levels.
- Pete appears in the Epic Mickey series. In the first game, he appears in the Gremlin Village as Small Pete (based on It's a Small World ride at Disneyland), dressed as one of the Dutch dolls. He later appears as his usual self in Mean Street (based on Main Street, USA), where he informs Mickey that there are many other Petes throughout the world, each themed after a specific zone. The original Pete (referred to as "Big Bad Pete") acts as a self-appointed enforcer of sorts at Mean Street and is often a source of quests for the player. The Petes return in the sequel, Epic Mickey 2: The Power of Two, initially appearing as allies to Mickey and Oswald. However, by the end of the game, they leave with the gremlin Prescott, presumably having plans for him. In the 3DS title Epic Mickey: Power of Illusion, several enemies based on Pete appear.
- Pete appears in Disney Magical World as a character in the main city of Castleton. One of the 100 stickers required to complete the game requires the player to fulfill a request made by Pete, which results in an in-game photo of the player alongside Pete.
- Pete appears as a playable character in Disney Magic Kingdoms. Before being unlocked, he is the first enemy boss in the game's main storyline. In the game he appears with his appearance from A Goofy Movie, with his appearance from Get a Horse! appearing as an alternate skin.

=== Kingdom Hearts series ===
Pete, as he appears in the Kingdom Hearts series. His outfit is designed by series creator Tetsuya Nomura.

Pete appears as a recurring villain within the Kingdom Hearts video game series. He was originally a steamboat captain, with Mickey Mouse as his deck hand (as they were seen in Steamboat Willie), and later the captain of the Royal Musketeers until his plans for a coup were foiled by Mickey (as they were seen in The Three Musketeers). After Disney Castle was built, Pete began causing mischief until he was defeated by Terra, Aqua, and Ventus and banished to another dimension by Queen Minnie. He was subsequently freed by Maleficent, to whom he became indebted, and vowed to amass an army of Heartless to return the favor.

- Pete makes several appearances in Kingdom Hearts 358/2 Days, where he is gathering Heartless for Maleficent. He is first seen exploring Agrabah in search of Jafar's magic lamp, but is secretly followed by Roxas and Axel, who are collecting hearts for Organization XIII. Pete uncovers a secret passage leading outside the city, inadvertently leading Roxas to the Cave of Wonders. Roxas later returns with Xion to investigate the cave, but the two are spotted by Pete, who assumes they had come to take the lamp and fights them. After Pete is defeated, he escapes. Pete reappears in Never Land, where he plants empty treasure chests across the island and sells maps leading to them to Captain Hook, knowing his greed will attract Heartless for him to collect. However, his plans are once again foiled when Roxas slays the Heartless to collect their hearts. Pete leads Hook to a final, gold-filled chest, which reacts to the darkness in Hook's heart and becomes a Heartless that Roxas defeats. Pete disappears, vowing revenge against Roxas if they ever meet again.
- In Kingdom Hearts II, Pete encounters Sora, Donald, and Goofy outside Yen Sid's tower and is disappointed to learn that they had previously defeated Maleficent while he was gathering Heartless. However, Maleficent is soon resurrected, and Pete continues his duties after updating her on what occurred in her absence, traveling to other worlds to recruit villains to join their cause turn them into Heartless, but is foiled by Sora and co. each time. Pete often incurs Maleficent's relentless annoyance and insults for his ineptness, despite his loyalty to her. After one such incident, Pete's yearning for going back in time to experience his wonder years as a steamboat captain summons a portal to the Timeless River world, which gives him the opportunity to put himself back in Maleficent's good graces. He goes back in time to steal his younger self's steamboat and alter the past to Maleficent's liking, but is defeated again by Sora and co., who have allied with the younger Pete. However, Pete once again proves his worth when he brings Maleficent to the Castle That Never Was, the headquarters of Organization XIII, for them to use as a new base of operations, though he is aware that the Heartless will be unruly in this realm. Pete contemplates running when the castle is overrun with Heartless, but decides to stand by Maleficent's side to hold them off and help Sora and his friends defeat Organization XIII, though the castle is destroyed.
- In Kingdom Hearts Coded, Pete is transported to the Datascape, where he assists in Maleficent's scheme to take over the virtual world and enslaves Riku with computer bugs. He is later confronted at Hollow Bastion, where he sends Riku to attack Sora. Sora attempts to rescue Pete and Maleficent from Heartless before they are crushed. However, Riku is able to rescue them and escort the villains back to their world.
- In Kingdom Hearts 3D: Dream Drop Distance, Pete and Maleficent take Minnie hostage and send a letter to Mickey, bringing them to a confrontation in the library of the castle. After Maleficent explains her past meeting with Xehanort, they demand that the Data Worlds be handed over to them. However, Pete loses Minnie when Lea arrives and scares him. Sora and Riku also battle another past incarnation of Pete from his time as the captain of Minnie's Royal Musketeers. He schemes to overthrow Minnie and become King, but is foiled by Mickey, Donald, Goofy, Sora, and Riku.
- Pete and Maleficent return in Kingdom Hearts III, where they seek the mysterious black box left behind by the Keyblade Master Luxu. In the game's post-credits scene, the two witness Xigbar, Luxu's current incarnation, meet with the Foretellers.

== International names and voice actors ==
Language	Name	Voice actor
English	Pete	Walt Disney (1928–1929); Billy Bletcher (1934–1944, 1952–1954); Pinto Colvig (1937, Mickey's Amateurs); John McLeish (1942, Bellboy Donald); Will Ryan (1983–1987, 2013); Arthur Burghardt (1990, The Prince and the Pauper, video games); Jim Cummings (1992–present)
Arabic	دنجل ("Dongol")	
Bulgarian	Черният Пийт ("Black Pete")	Georgi Todorov
Chinese	坏庀特 (Huài pǐ tè; "Bad Pete")	
Croatian	Daba	Siniša Ružić
Danish	Sorteper ("Black-Per")	Erik Mørk (1st dub of Mickey's Christmas Carol); Lars Thiesgaard
Dutch	Boris Boef ("Boris Crook")	Hero Muller; Jan Anne Drenth; Pim Koopman
Estonian	Kõuts Karlo	
Finnish	Musta Pekka ("Black Pekka", often just Pekka)	Juhani Kumpulainen (1963, The Hunting Instinct); Markku Riikonen (early 1990s to 2000); Pertti Koivula (2002, the second dub of Mickey's Christmas Carol); Tuomo Rysti (2004–2021); Markus Bäckman (2018 ("A Pete Scorned"), 2022 (Chip 'n Dale: Rescue Rangers)); Arttu Wiskari (2021–present)
French/Québécois	Pat Hibulaire (a pun: patibulaire means 'sinister-looking')	Roger Carel (first dubbing of first cartoons and Mickey's Christmas Carol); Michel Vocoret (second dubbing of first cartoons and Mickey's Christmas Carol, The Prince and the Pauper); Alain Dorval (since 1992)
German	Kater Karlo (Kater signifies a male cat) – full name: Karl Friedhelm Katermann	Tilo Schmitz
Greek	Μάυρος Πήτ ("Black Pete")	Kostas Triantafyllopoulos
Hebrew	פיט השחור (Pete ha-shakhór, "Pete the Black")	Aryeh Moskona; Shimon Cohen (alternating); Micah Uzyn Salyan; Dani Litani
Hungarian	Pete	Gábor Vass
Icelandic	Svarti-Pétur ("Black-Peter")	Steinn Ármann Magnússon; Jóhann Sigurðarson (Goof Troop)
Indonesian	Boris	
Italian	Pietro Gambadilegno ("Pegleg Peter")	Massimo Corvo (from 1990s)
Japanese	ピート (Pīto)	Seiji Endō and Minoru Uchida (1984–1988; Pony and Bandai-dubbed shorts); Daisuke Gōri (1984–1985; Nippon TV's Mickey Mouse and Donald Duck); Tōru Ōhira (1988–2015); Katsuhiro Kitagawa (2015–present)
Korean	피트 (Piteu)	Han Sang Duk
Norwegian	Svarte-Petter ("Black-Peter")	Nils Ole Oftebro (most appearances); Magnus Nielsen (A few audiobooks); Knut Risan (First dub of Mickey's Christmas Carol); Harald Mæle (First dub of The Prince and the Pauper)
Polish	Czarny Piotruś ("Black Peter")	Włodzimierz Bednarski
Portuguese (Brazil)	João Bafo-de-Onça ("John Jaguar-Breath"), earlier name: Pete Perna-de-Pau ("Pegleg Pete")	Orlando Drummond (1970s to early 1990s); Antônio Moreno, Pietro Mário, Mauro Ramos (late 1990s to 2000s)
Portuguese (Portugal)	Bafo-de-Onça ("Jaguar-Breath"), Pete	Carlos Freixo; Luís Mascarenhas
Romanian	Pete cel Rău ("Pete the Bad")	
Russian	Пит Деревянная Нога ("Peg-Leg Pete")	Andrew Yaroslawthev (1994-1997); Vadim Nikitin; Alexsey Guryev (2006-2010)
Serbian	Hromi Daba ("Daba the Lame")	
Spanish (Spain)	Pete Patapalo ("Pegleg Pete"); Pete el Malo ("Pete the Bad")	Juan Fernández
Spanish (Latin America)	Pedro Pata de Palo ("Peg Leg Peter'); Pedro el Malo ("Peter the Bad"); Pete el Negro ("Black Peter", Chile)	Francisco Colmenero
Swedish	Svarte Petter ("Black Peter")	Jan Koldenius (first dubbing of first cartoons); Björn Gedda (the original dub of Mickey's Christmas Carol); Per Sandborgh (Duck Tales); Gunnar Ernblad (Duck Tales); Anders Lönnbro (second dubbing of first cartoons and Goof Troop); Stephan Karlsén (since 1995 and The Prince and The Pauper); Bengt Skogholt (Mickey, Donald, Goofy: The three musketeers and Mickey Mouse Clubhouse)
Turkish	Barut ("Gunpowder")	
