= Mickey's Amateurs =

1937 Mickey Mouse cartoon

- Screenshot of the short film.
- Directed by: Pinto Colvig; Erdman Penner; Walt Pfeiffer
- Produced by: Walt Disney
- Starring: Walt Disney; Florence Gill; Clarence Nash; Pinto Colvig
- Music by: Oliver Wallace
- Animation by: Art Babbitt; Les Clark; Al Eugster; Ed Love; Stan Quackenbush; Ralph J. Sommerville; Marvin Woodward; Tom Palmer
- Color process: Technicolor
- Production company: Walt Disney Productions
- Distributed by: United Artists
- Release date: April 17, 1937
- Running time: 8:24
- Country: United States
- Language: English

Mickey's Amateurs is a 1937 American animated short film produced by Walt Disney Productions and released by United Artists. Originally entitled Mickey's Amateur Concert during production, the cartoon depicts an amateur talent show hosted by Mickey Mouse. It was the 94th short film in the Mickey Mouse film series, and the fifth for that year. It was co-directed by Pinto Colvig, Erdman Penner, and Walt Pfeiffer, and features original and adapted music by Oliver Wallace. The voice cast includes Walt Disney as Mickey, Clarence Nash as Donald Duck, Florence Gill as Clara Cluck, and Pinto Colvig as Pete and Goofy.

== Plot ==
Mickey Mouse hosts an amateur radio talent show in front of a live audience, in which he terminates unworthy performances by ringing a gong.

After ending Pete's rendition of "Asleep in the Deep", Mickey introduces Donald Duck, who tries reciting "Twinkle, Twinkle, Little Star", but forgets the words. Mickey rings the gong, and Donald is pulled backstage.

Clara Cluck performs the show's next set with a clucking version of the Luigi Arditi waltz "Il Bacio", accompanied by Clarabelle Cow on piano. Despite several blunders, the performance is the first to avoid the gong.

Later, Donald returns to the stage with a machine gun and tries reciting "Twinkle, Twinkle, Little Star" while holding Mickey and the audience at gunpoint, but he once again forgets the words. When the audience laughs at him, he opens fire and is pulled backstage.

For the show's final set, Goofy uses a multi-instrumental device on wheels to perform "In the Good Old Summer Time" and "There'll Be a Hot Time in the Old Town Tonight", but the tempo and intensity of the latter song destroy the machine. Donald performs a rapid-fire word-perfect recitation of "Twinkle, Twinkle, Little Star" from within Goofy's hat, and the "iris out" effect which ends the cartoon closes on his neck. He struggles to keep it open, but it finally closes.

== Voice cast ==
- Walt Disney as Mickey Mouse
- Clarence Nash as Donald Duck
- Pinto Colvig as Goofy and Pete
- Florence Gill as Clara Cluck

== History ==
Mickey's Amateurs pokes fun at "amateur hour" radio shows, popular entertainment in the 1930s and '40s. Perhaps the most famous example is the Major Bowes Amateur Hour in which the host, Edward Bowes, was known to strike a gong to stop an amateur performance. Mickey Mouse's repeating of the words "Okay, okay" in the film was recognized by audiences at the time as a parody of Bowes.

The film was also inspired by the 1934 Disney film Orphan's Benefit. This film also featured a stage show with acts interspersed by Donald attempting a poetic recitation.

The short film inspired the model of the game show The Gong Show, hosted in the '70s by Chuck Barris, who used the same method of show-host Mickey use in the short.

== Reception ==
The Motion Picture Herald published a review of Mickey's Amateurs on June 19, 1937: "The subject must be seen to be appreciated and enjoyed. The fun it offers defies description."

== Home media ==
The short was released on December 4, 2001, on Walt Disney Treasures: Mickey Mouse in Living Color.

== See also ==
- Mickey Mouse (film series)
