= Golden Eggs (film) =

1941 Donald Duck cartoon

- Theatrical release poster
- Directed by: Wilfred Jackson
- Story by: Carl Barks; Jack Hannah
- Produced by: Walt Disney
- Starring: Clarence Nash; Florence Gill
- Music by: Leigh Harline
- Animation by: Paul Allen; Ted Bonnicksen; Bob Carlson; Walt Clinton; Russ Dyson; Bernard Wolf
- Color process: Technicolor
- Production company: Walt Disney Productions
- Distributed by: RKO Radio Pictures
- Release date: March 7, 1941
- Running time: 8 minutes
- Country: United States
- Language: English

Golden Eggs is a 1941 American animated short film directed by Wilfred Jackson and produced by Walt Disney, featuring Donald Duck.

== Plot ==
Donald reads a newspaper that the eggs' value is really high and the price amount is increased; he thinks that he could get rich, so he goes into the henhouse and changes the music from the record player. While the hens are dancing and popping their eggs out, Donald collects them and puts them into a huge basket.

A rooster standing guard reveals Donald and kicks him out. Donald is trying to avoid the rooster, so he disguises himself as a hen. He is mistaken for the rooster's love interest. They dance together, but Donald's disguise falls off. With the rubber glove comb constantly coming loose and a caterpillar falling down the back of his suit, Donald is ever at the risk of being discovered.

Donald is then forced to dance with the rooster, but at the climax he spins like a tornado, so strong that all of his disguise falls off. The rooster then see through the masquerade and resumes chasing him. Donald grab the huge basket of eggs, but two fell out and he slipped right into the basket, cracking all the eggs in the process. With the rooster crowing in victory, Donald mumbling at his defeat.

== Voice cast ==
- Clarence Nash as Donald Duck
- Florence Gill, The King Sisters and Margaret Wright as Hens
- Gertrude Lawrence as Rooster

== Reception ==
The Film Daily called the short a "funny cartoon", saying that "Donald runs afoul of the rooster, boss of the barnyard, and is a sadder and wiser man before the rooster finishes with him."

== Television ==
- Donald's Quack Attack, episode #10
- Mickey's Mouse Tracks, episode #67

== Home media ==
The short was released on May 18, 2004, on Walt Disney Treasures: The Chronological Donald, Volume One: 1934-1941.

Additional releases include:

- Walt Disney's Classic Cartoon Favorites: Starring Donald
