= Milt Neil =

American animator and comics artist (1914–1997)

- Born: Milton Neil; May 30, 1914; Irvington, Essex County, New Jersey, U.S.
- Died: October 18, 1997 (aged 83); Wayne Township, Passaic County, New Jersey, U.S.
- Other name: The Duck Man
- Occupations: Animator, comics artist, toy designer
- Years active: 1930s–1970s
- Employer(s): Walt Disney Studios, Walter Lantz Productions, Hasbro
- Notable work: Fantasia, Dumbo, The Reluctant Dragon, Saludos Amigos

Milton C. "Milt" Neil (May 30, 1914 – October 18, 1997), sometimes known as "the Duck Man", was an American animator, toy designer and comics artist. He worked for Walt Disney Animation Studios during the Golden Age of Animation. Nicknamed “The Duck Man” for his work on Donald Duck comics and animation, he was known for his masterful character animation, particularly expressive and comedic performances of various anthropomorphic characters (most prominently Donald Duck).

Joining the studio in 1935, Neil contributed to some of Disney's biggest landmark films such as Snow White and the Seven Dwarfs, Fantasia and Dumbo, until his departure in 1944. He was admired for his ability to bring personality and humor to anthropomorphic characters while adhering to Disney’s classical animation principles.

Neil later worked for Walter Lantz Productions and as a toy designer for Hasbro, and also taught animation in his later years.

== Personal life ==
Milton C. Neil was born on 30 May, 1914 in Irvington, New Jersey, the son of Polish immigrants Adam Peter Nieliwocki and Stella Hodureck Nieliwocki.

After retirement, he owned two restaurants, the Laguna Beach Club and the former Holster Restaurant. He was also a private pilot.

Neil died in 1997 and was preceded by his parents. His wife, Dorothy Elizabeth Golden Neil passed in 2004.

== Career ==
He worked for Disney Studios from 1935 to 1944. He worked on several major Disney feature length works including Snow White and the Seven Dwarfs, Fantasia, Dumbo, Saludos Amigos, The Reluctant Dragon and The Three Caballeros. After leaving Disney he briefly worked for Walter Lantz Productions.

He was also active in advertising and redesigned the two mascots of Pea Soup Andersen's. They received their permanent names Hap-Pea and Pea-Wee through a contest.

Neil became involved with the children's show Howdy Doody, for whom he designed puppets and various other merchandising objects. Together with Chad Grothkopf he adapted the TV show into a newspaper comic between 1950 and 1953, though he only worked on it for the first three months, after which Grothkopf took over.

Neil also ran the character animation program at the Joe Kubert School of Cartoon and Graphic Design.

== Filmography ==
Year	Title	Position	Characters
1937	Snow White and the Seven Dwarfs	animator	Forest animals
1939	The Ugly Duckling	animator (uncredited)	Ugly duckling
1940	Pinocchio	animator (uncredited)	The Blue Fairy
1940	Fantasia	animator	
1941	The Reluctant Dragon	animator	
1941	Dumbo	animator	Timothy Q. Mouse / Crows
1942	How to Play Baseball	animator	
1942	Deh Fuehrer's Face	animator (uncredited)	Donald Duck
1943	Fall Out Fall In	animator	
1943	Saludos Amigos	animator	Donald Duck / Llama
1944	The Three Caballeros	animator	
1946	Dumb Bell of the Yukon	animator (uncredited)	
1947	Fun and Fancy Free	character animator (uncredited)	Donald Duck / Mickey Mouse / Goofy

== Sources ==
"Milt Neil – Animator". MUBI.
