= Silly Symphony (comic strip) =

1932-1945 Disney comic strip

- Author(s): Earl Duvall, Ted Osborne, Merrill De Maris, Hubie Karp, Bill Walsh
- Illustrator(s): Earl Duvall, Al Taliaferro, Hank Porter, Bob Grant, Karl Karpé, Paul Murry, Dick Moores
- Current status/schedule: Concluded Sunday topper strip
- Launch date: January 10, 1932
- End date: October 7, 1945
- Syndicate(s): King Features Syndicate
- Genre(s): Humor; Funny animals

Silly Symphony (initially titled Silly Symphonies) is a weekly Disney comic strip that debuted on January 10, 1932, as a topper for the Mickey Mouse strip's Sunday page. The strip featured adaptations of Walt Disney's popular short film series, Silly Symphony, which released 75 cartoons from 1929 to 1939, as well as other cartoons and animated films. The comic strip outlived its parent series by six years, ending on October 7, 1945.

Silly Symphony initially related the adventures of Bucky Bug, the first Disney character to originate in the comics. It went on to print loose adaptations of Silly Symphony shorts, often using the characters and setting of the original shorts, but adding new plotlines and incidents. Later, it went on to print adaptations of some of Disney's feature films, as well as periods of gag strips featuring Donald Duck and Pluto. By late 1935, the strip had become a standalone half-page, and was no longer strictly a topper for the Mickey Mouse Sunday strip.

The strip was initially titled Silly Symphonies; after two years, the name was changed to Silly Symphony. The switch happened in the February 18, 1934 strip, just three weeks before Bucky Bug would be replaced with a new storyline, "Birds of a Feather".

The complete strip has been reprinted in four hardcover collections, Silly Symphonies: The Complete Disney Classics, published from 2016 to 2019 by IDW Publishing's Library of American Comics imprint.

== Development ==
The original creative team for the strip was animator Earl Duvall and artist Al Taliaferro, with Duvall responsible for writing and penciling, and Taliaferro inking. Duvall, who wrote the Silly Symphony short Bugs in Love, created Bucky Bug as the hero of the new Sunday strip. In the first sequence, which lasts for three months, a young bug is born and sets forth into the world to make a name for himself. Stumped for a name, he asks the readers for help, and the strip encouraged readers to write to their newspapers with name suggestions. In the strip, a big pile of letters is delivered to the bug, and he spends two weeks combing through the letters to reveal the winning name: Bucky Bug. Bucky travels through the forest to make his fortune, meeting up with a "friendly tramp" named Bo, and traveling to the insect city of Junkville. Bucky falls in love with the beautiful June Bugg, and her father—the mayor of Junkville—makes Bucky a general of his army. The bug couple is happy, but just a few strips later, the alarm sounds to alert the community that war has been declared by the flies.

Duvall began an epic battle against the flies which raged for 28 weeks, but just before the story ended in April 1933, Duvall suddenly left the Disney studio. Animator Jack Kinney wrote that Duvall owed Walt Disney several weeks worth of storyboards, and Duvall simply gathered his belongings one day and left the company, "leaving Walt holding the bag". Alberto Becattini suggests that Duvall's hasty exit was due to owing money to his colleagues that he couldn't pay. Whatever the reason for Duvall's departure was, Taliaferro became the artist for the strip, and he remained in that position for six years, with Ted Osborne as the strip's writer. Osborne and Taliaferro continued the story of Bucky for another 11 months, finally ending the saga on March 4, 1934.

In 1934, Taliaferro drew the Silly Symphony story arc based on the cartoon The Wise Little Hen, which featured the first appearance of Donald Duck as a secondary character. That story, which lasted on the Sunday pages from September to December 1934, gave Taliaferro a particular liking for the Duck's character. He pitched the idea of a Donald strip to Walt Disney, and Disney allowed him a trial run in the Silly Symphony comic. Finishing up a "The Three Little Pigs" adaptation, Taliaferro and writer Ted Osborne began an extended run of Donald Duck gag strips from August 30, 1936, to December 5, 1937. Taliaferro then pitched the idea of a solo Donald comic strip to King Features Syndicate, working with writers Merrill De Maris and Homer Brightman. On February 7, 1938, the Donald Duck comic strip started appearing in daily newspapers. A Sunday version was added on December 10, 1939.

For the strip's first four years—from "Bucky Bug" through "The Further Adventures of the Three Little Pigs"—all of the dialogue was written in rhyming couplets. This changed with the 15-month period from August 1936 to December 1937 when Donald Duck was featured in the strip, often performing pantomime gags with little or no dialogue at all. When Donald relinquished the strip in favor of an adaptation of the new Snow White and the Seven Dwarfs film, the dialogue was written in storybook style, without rhyming couplets, and the rhymes never returned.

The Snow White and the Seven Dwarfs sequence was the first of many newspaper comic strip adaptations of newly released Disney animated features. The film's general release in February 1938 came in the middle of the newspaper continuity, which was published from December 1937 to April 1938. The strip used a number of story ideas that were ultimately abandoned in the film, including a more elaborate and comical meeting between the Prince and Snow White (in which Snow White creates a "dummy" of her dream prince, which the real Prince sneaks into), and an entire storyline in which the Evil Queen kidnaps the Prince to prevent him from saving Snow White.

After the Snow White adaptation in 1938, the strip featured a mix of the three established motifs—further adaptations of Silly Symphony shorts (Farmyard Symphony, The Ugly Duckling) and animated features (Pinocchio and Bambi) and several runs of gag strips featuring a popular character, Pluto.

Pluto was given star billing in a five-week run of strips titled Pluto the Pup, which ran from February 19 to March 19, 1939. The dog's owner, Mickey Mouse, was already featured in the other cartoon on the Mickey Mouse strip's Sunday page, and by this time, Donald Duck was also busy in his own strip, so in Pluto's first Silly Symphony run, he lives with Mickey's friend, Goofy (in the first strip, Goofy complains to Pluto, "Why'd I tell Mickey I'd take care of yuh?"). Later, Pluto is also seen being cared for by Minnie Mouse, Clarabelle Cow and Horace Horsecollar.

Pluto's run was interrupted by a month-long adaptation of The Ugly Duckling, and then he returned for a much longer period, from April 23 to December 17, 1939. This was followed by a two-month adaptation of Pinocchio, and then Pluto returned for his third and final Silly Symphony stint, from April 14 to November 3, 1940.

Starting in 1942, the strip featured José Carioca, who had recently been introduced in the film Saludos Amigos. According to comics historian Maurice Horn: "The first Sunday page opened with a panoramic tour of Rio de Janeiro before closing up on the shack that was 'the home of a young-man-about-town, a gay carefree Brazilian papagaio named José Carioca'. This marked the first U.S. appearance of the nattily-dressed, pleasure-seeking parrot... The gags were quite unsophisticated and revolved around three main themes: the antihero's scheming to get a free meal, his pursuit of the opposite sex, and his imaginative avoidance of work". The strip also included José's friends João and Nestor, and featured continuing stories. Alberto Becattini notes: "In spite of always being broke, the parrot liked to attend posh restaurants and hotels, where he often met with such curvy bird-faced chicas as the wealthy María Rocha Vaz, the blonde dancer Rae, and Gloria del Orto, in a series of adventures that even led him to the Amazon forest".

In April 1944, José was joined by the Mexican rooster Panchito, who would be introduced as José's companion in the 1945 film The Three Caballeros. José and Panchito competed to win the heart of the horse-riding Mimi, and a few months later, in October, Panchito took over the strip.

With Panchito as the main character, the action of the strip moved to Mexico, and became a gag-a-week strip featuring the rooster and his horse, Señor Martinez. Horn describes this cycle as well: "José made way for another Latin-American knockabout, the fiery rooster Panchito... As energetic as José was lazy, the sombrero-hatted, gun-toting Mexican fowl was always shown riding horses, fighting bulls, and lassoing cattle, when he was not busy wooing his chick, the fickle Chiquita". The final strip ran on October 7, 1945.

== Ending ==
On October 14, 1945, the strip was replaced by Uncle Remus and His Tales of Br'er Rabbit, a strip inspired by the upcoming 1946 film Song of the South. The Uncle Remus strip began, like the others, as a topper for the Mickey Mouse strip, but after the first few years, almost always appeared on its own. The previous comic strip adaptations of Disney films lasted for four or five months, but the Uncle Remus strip continued for almost thirty years, telling new stories of Br'er Rabbit and friends, until the strip was discontinued on December 31, 1972.

Two more Silly Symphony-style feature film adaptations appeared in the early 50s, running 16 weeks each: Cinderella (1950) and Alice in Wonderland (1951).

A similar Sunday strip, Walt Disney's Treasury of Classic Tales, launched on July 13, 1952, with The Story of Robin Hood, a five-month adaptation of Disney's 1952 live-action film. The strip, which was principally a vehicle for promoting new and re-released Disney films, adapted both live-action films and cartoons. The strip ran for 35 years, until February 15, 1987.

== Storylines ==
The headings in the table below refer to the IDW Publishing reprint collections, Silly Symphonies: The Complete Disney Classics. Writing and art credits are from the reprint collections.

Title	Year	Dates	Based on	Writing	Art
Volume 1: Introducing Bucky Bug (1932-1935)
Bucky Bug	1932-1934	Jan 10, 1932 - Mar 4, 1934	Bugs in Love (1932)	Earl Duvall, Ted Osborne & Merrill De Maris	Earl Duvall & Al Taliaferro
Birds of a Feather	1934	Mar 11 - June 17	Birds in the Spring (1933)	Ted Osborne	Al Taliaferro
Penguin Isle	1934	July 1 - Sept 9	Peculiar Penguins (1934)	Ted Osborne	Al Taliaferro
The Wise Little Hen	1934	Sept 16 - Dec 16	The Wise Little Hen (1934)	Ted Osborne	Al Taliaferro
The Boarding-School Mystery	1934-1935	Dec 23 - Feb 17	The Tortoise and the Hare (1935)	Ted Osborne	Al Taliaferro
The Robber Kitten	1935	Feb 24 - Apr 21	The Robber Kitten (1935)	Ted Osborne	Al Taliaferro
Cookieland	1935	Apr 28 - July 21	The Cookie Carnival (1935)	Ted Osborne	Al Taliaferro
Volume 2: Featuring the Three Little Pigs (1935-1939)
Three Little Kittens	1935	July 28 - Oct 20	Three Orphan Kittens (1935)	Ted Osborne	Al Taliaferro
The Life and Adventures of Elmer the Elephant	1935-1936	Oct 27 - Jan 12	Elmer Elephant (1936)	Ted Osborne	Al Taliaferro
The Further Adventures of the Three Little Pigs	1936	Jan 19 - Aug 23	Three Little Wolves (1936)	Ted Osborne	Al Taliaferro
Donald Duck	1936-1937	Aug 30, 1936 - Dec 5, 1937	Gag strips featuring Donald Duck	Ted Osborne	Al Taliaferro
Snow White and the Seven Dwarfs	1937-1938	Dec 12 - Apr 24	Snow White and the Seven Dwarfs (1937)	Merrill De Maris	Hank Porter (pencil) & Bob Grant (ink)
The Practical Pig	1938	May 1 - Aug 7	The Practical Pig (1939)	Merrill De Maris	Al Taliaferro
Mother Pluto	1938	Aug 14 - Oct 16	Mother Pluto (1936)	Merrill De Maris	Al Taliaferro
The Farmyard Symphony	1938	Oct 23 - Nov 27	Farmyard Symphony (1938)	Merrill De Maris	Al Taliaferro
Timid Elmer	1938-1939	Dec 4 - Feb 12	Elmer Elephant (1936)	Merrill De Maris	Al Taliaferro
Volume 3: Featuring Pluto, Goofy, Pinocchio... and More! (1939-1942)
Pluto the Pup	1939	Feb 19 - March 19	Gag strips featuring Pluto	Merrill De Maris	Al Taliaferro
The Ugly Duckling	1939	March 26 - April 16	The Ugly Duckling (1939)	Merrill De Maris	Al Taliaferro
Pluto the Pup	1939	Apr 23 - Dec 17	Gag strips featuring Pluto	Hubie Karp	Bob Grant (pencil) & Al Taliaferro (ink)
Pinocchio	1939-1940	Dec 24 - April 7	Pinocchio (1940)	Merrill De Maris	Hank Porter (pencil) & Bob Grant (ink)
Pluto the Pup	1940	April 14 - Nov 3	Gag strips featuring Pluto	Hubie Karp	Bob Grant
Little Hiawatha	1940-1942	Nov 10 - July 12	Little Hiawatha (1937)	Hubie Karp	Bob Grant
Volume 4: Featuring José Carioca and Panchito (1942-1945)
Bambi	1942	July 19 - Oct 4	Bambi (1942)	Merrill De Maris	Bob Grant (pencil) & Karl Karpé (ink)
José Carioca	1942-1944	Oct 11- Oct 1	Gag strips featuring José Carioca	Hubie Karp	first Bob Grant (pencil) & Dick Moores (ink); later Paul Murry (pencil) & Karl Karpé (ink)
Panchito	1944-1945	Oct 8- Oct 7	Gag strips featuring Panchito	Bill Walsh	Paul Murry (pencil) & Dick Moores (ink)

== Comic books ==
Strips from Silly Symphony were reprinted in Disney's flagship anthology comic book Walt Disney's Comics and Stories, beginning with some Pluto the Pup strips in issue #12 (September 1941), followed by The Boarding-School Mystery in issue #14 (November 1941), The Further Adventures of the Three Little Pigs in issue #15 (December 1941), and an abridged version of Bucky Bug Gets His Name in issue #20 (May 1942).

Three of the Silly Symphony stories inspired long-running features in Walt Disney's Comics and Stories.

=== Bucky Bug ===
In 1942–43, Walt Disney's Comics and Stories reprinted all of Duvall and Taliaferro's Bucky Bug strips in issues #20-28. Following this, the editors decided to produce new Bucky Bug stories, retaining the strip's use of verse in the story's dialogue and captions. The first new Bucky story, "A Cure for Gout", appeared in issue #39 (December 1943), drawn by Taliaferro and Dick Moores.

The second original story, "The Playground Plot", appeared in the following issue, #40 (January 1944). This story was written and drawn by Carl Beuttner, who continued as the series' main creator until 1946, with his last story in issue #72 (Sept 1946). Beuttner added new characters, such as the Ant King and the Sheriff of Junkville.

The Bucky stories published from issue #73 to #77 were written alternately by Vivie Risto and George Waiss, and then Ralph Heimdahl took over the series, starting with issue #78 (March 1947). Heimdahl created all the Bucky stories until issue #99 (December 1948). Heimdahl introduced June's younger brother Junior Bugg in #79 (April 1947), and Junior continued to appear until #100 (January 1949).

After Heimdahl's run, the remaining WDC&S Bucky stories were written by several creators, including Tony Strobl, Gil Turner, Jim Pabian and Tony Pabian. Bucky's last Comics and Stories story appeared in issue #120 (September 1950).

Following this, Bucky's final solo comic story was published in the Silly Symphonies comic #6 (August 1956), drawn by Al Hubbard and featuring Bucky and Bo the tramp trying to capture a green lake monster.

Bucky Bug stories never lost their popularity in the Netherlands, where original Bucky comics have been made continuously from the 1970s to the present day.

Bucky Bug stories came back into fashion in the USA in the late 1980s, when Gladstone Publishing occasionally reprinted 1940s Bucky tales in Walt Disney's Comics and Stories. These were followed by additional stories in Disney Comics, Gemstone, and IDW issues of WDCS over the years, as well as in various larger anthologies of historic Disney comics (e.g. Gemstone's Walt Disney Treasures paperback collection, 2006; IDW's Walt Disney's Comics and Stories 75th Anniversary Special, 2015). While some of these stories were vintage American reprints, others were new-to-the-USA Dutch stories.

In a singular instance, WDCS 677 (2007) featured an entirely new American Bucky story, "Bucky's Birthday Party," made for the character's 75th anniversary. To date, it is the only entirely new North American Bucky story to have been produced in many years.

=== Li'l Bad Wolf ===
"The Three Little Pigs" feature inspired the creation of Li'l Bad Wolf, the Big Bad Wolf's errant son, who wants to be friends with the Pigs. Li'l Bad Wolf's adventures began in Walt Disney's Comics and Stories issue #52 (Jan 1945), and he made continuous appearances until almost the end of the comic's original run, issue #259 (April 1962).

In later decades, while never again a continuous feature, Wolf stories continued to appear in the magazine at least several times per year, often in all-new or new-to-the-USA material. In the 2000s, the Big Bad Wolf often became the title character in the stories, though Li'l Wolf continued to play a major role.

=== Little Hiawatha ===
Little Hiawatha had his own monthly story in Walt Disney's Comics and Stories for two years, from issue #143 (Aug 1952) to #168 (September 1954).

=== Silly Symphonies comic book ===
Dell Comics also published a Silly Symphonies anthology comic book, with nine issues released at irregular intervals between September 1952 and February 1959. The series printed adaptations of a few of the Silly Symphony shorts that weren't adapted in the Sunday comic strip - The Grasshopper and the Ants, The Golden Touch and The Country Cousin - as well as stories featuring Silly Symphony characters, including Bucky Bug, Little Hiawatha, Elmer Elephant, Toby Tortoise and Spotty the Pig. There were also adaptations of non-Symphony Disney shorts like Lambert the Sheepish Lion, Morris the Midget Moose, and Chicken Little, and a large number of stories featuring characters from other projects, including Jiminy Cricket, Dumbo, Thumper, the Seven Dwarfs, Humphrey the Bear, and Bongo the Wonder Bear from Fun and Fancy Free.

== Reprints ==
The complete strip has been reprinted in four hardcover collections, Silly Symphonies: The Complete Disney Classics, published by IDW Publishing's Library of American Comics imprint.

The first volume, published in 2016, includes all of the strips from "Bucky Bug" (1932) to "Cookieland" (1935). Volume 2, also published in 2016, includes "Three Little Kittens" (1935) to "Timid Elmer" (1939). Volume 3, published in 2018, includes "Pluto the Pup" (1939) to "Little Hiawatha" (1942). The fourth volume, published in 2019, concludes the series with "Bambi" (1942) through "Panchito" (1945).

The copyright then passed to Fantagraphics, who started republishing the strips with a different layout in a new collection entitled Walt Disney's Silly Symphonies, beginning in April 2023.
