= Florence Gill =

British actress (1877–1965)

- Florence Gill in The Reluctant Dragon 1941
- Born: 27 July 1877; London, England
- Died: 19 February 1965 (aged 87); Woodland Hills, California, U.S.
- Occupation: Actress
- Years active: 1931–1951

Florence Gill (27 July 1877 – 19 February 1965) was a British actress.

In Walt Disney's animated films, Gill made a specialty for 20 years of playing hens, including Clara Cluck, The Wise Little Hen and other assorted fowl.

Gill was a member of the cast of Uncle Walter's Doghouse on NBC radio. She also played Clara Cluck on the 1938 radio show The Mickey Mouse Theater of the Air.

In addition to her animation work, Gill also appeared in live-action films. She performed her musical hen impersonation in front of a radio microphone in two 1935 musical comedies: Every Night at Eight and Here Comes the Band.

Her interment was located at Chapel of the Pines Crematory in Los Angeles, California.

== Live-action filmography ==
Year	Title	Role	Notes
1935	Every Night at Eight	Henrietta (Chicken Lady Singer)	Uncredited
1935	Welcome Home	Singer	Uncredited
1935	Here Comes the Band	Mrs. Ella Sacks	Uncredited
1935	Way Down East	Quilting Party Woman	
1937	Larceny on the Air	Spinster	
1937	Mountain Music	Girl	Uncredited
1937	Ever Since Eve	Annie - the Cleaning Lady	Uncredited
1937	She Had to Eat	Singer	Uncredited
1937	Mr. Dodd Takes the Air	Miss Carrie Bowers	Uncredited
1941	The Reluctant Dragon	Herself / Clara Cluck	
1942	Call Out the Marines	Elderly Lady Who Wants to See Horses	Uncredited
1942	Obliging Young Lady	Miss Hollyrod	
1942	Eagle Squadron	Cockney	Uncredited
1942	I Married a Witch	Woman Playing Chess	Uncredited

== Animation filmography ==
Year	Title	Role
1931	Birds of a Feather	Hen
1934	Funny Little Bunnies	Hens
1934	Orphan's Benefit	Clara Cluck
1934	The Wise Little Hen	Hen
1935	Cock o' the Walk	Hen
1936	Mickey's Grand Opera	Clara Cluck
1936	Mother Pluto	Hen
1937	Mickey's Amateurs	Clara Cluck
1938	Farmyard Symphony	Hens & Rooster
1938	The Fox Hunt	Clara Cluck
1938	Self Control	Chicken
1941	Golden Eggs	Hens & Rooster
1941	The Nifty Nineties	Chickens
1942	Mickey's Birthday Party	Clara Cluck
1942	Symphony Hour	Clara Cluck
1943	Chicken Little	Hen
1944	Contrary Condor	Condors
1945	The Eyes Have It	Hens
1949	The Greener Yard	Hen
1951	Chicken in the Rough	Hen & Rooster
