= Symphony Hour =

1942 Mickey Mouse cartoon

- Theatrical release poster
- Directed by: Riley Thomson
- Produced by: Walt Disney
- Starring: Billy Bletcher; Pinto Colvig; Walt Disney; John McLeish
- Music by: Franz von Suppé
- Animation by: Jack Campbell; Les Clark; Ed Love; Jim Moore; Kenneth Muse; Riley Thomson; Bernard Wolf
- Color process: Technicolor
- Production company: Walt Disney Productions
- Distributed by: RKO Radio Pictures
- Release date: March 20, 1942
- Running time: 6 minutes
- Country: United States
- Language: English

Symphony Hour is a 1942 American animated short film produced by Walt Disney Productions and released by RKO Radio Pictures. The cartoon depicts Mickey Mouse conducting a symphony orchestra sponsored by Pete. The film was directed by Riley Thomson and features music adapted from the "Light Cavalry Overture" by Franz von Suppé. The voice cast includes Walt Disney as Mickey, Billy Bletcher as Pete (as Sylvester Macaroni), and John McLeish as a radio announcer. It was the 117th short in the Mickey Mouse film series to be released, and the second for that year.

The film marked the last theatrical appearance of Horace Horsecollar, Clarabelle Cow, and Clara Cluck for over 40 years, finally reappearing in Mickey's Christmas Carol (1983). Symphony Hour is also the last time that Mickey appeared with either Donald Duck or Goofy in a theatrical film for the same length of time.

Symphony Hour bears similarities with the 1935 film The Band Concert. Leonard Maltin called this short a "Spike Jones version of The Band Concert".

The soundtrack for the "ruined" version of the Light Cavalry Overture was used in the October 22, 1956 episode of The Mickey Mouse Club.

== Plot ==
Mickey conducts a radio orchestra who performs the Franz von Suppé's Light Cavalry Overture. The sponsor (Pete, under the name Sylvester Macaroni) loves the rehearsal and agrees to have it shown in concert. Besides Goofy, other members of the orchestra include Donald Duck, Clara Cluck, Clarabelle Cow and Horace Horsecollar. On the night of the performance, everyone is soon ready, except, of course, for Goofy, who accidentally drops all the instruments under an elevator, severely damaging them and thus rendering them unable to make proper musical sounds. Mickey is left unaware of the unfortunate mishap until the time to go on the air and the musicians start to "play" the damaged instruments. Throughout the outrageous concert, Mickey struggles with anxiety while Macaroni throws a tantrum inside his private viewing room. At one point, Donald is so fed up with the chaos caused by the damaged instruments that he packs his things and leaves. However, Mickey, who is determined to carry on come what may, threatens Donald at gunpoint to prevent him from leaving. The shot of the gun was cut in some television prints. Macaroni is reduced to tears when the concert ends, believing his reputation to be ruined, but lightens up when he hears the thunderous applause from the audience. He immediately runs to the orchestra room and carries Mickey Mouse in extreme approval, with the latter not knowing anything that happened.

== Cast ==
- Mickey Mouse: Walt Disney
- Sylvester Macaroni (Pete): Billy Bletcher
- Goofy: Pinto Colvig
- Radio Announcer: John McLeish

Donald Duck, Horace Horsecollar, Clarabelle Cow, and Clara Cluck have no dialogue in the film.

== Production team ==
Principal animation

- Jack Campbell
- Les Clark
- George De Beeson
- John Elliotte
- Ed Love
- Jim Moore
- Kenneth Muse
- Riley Thomson
- Bernard Wolf

Effects animation

- Joseph Gayek
- Jack Manning
- Ed Parks

== Home media ==
The short was released on May 18, 2004 on Walt Disney Treasures: Mickey Mouse in Living Color, Volume Two: 1939-Today.

== See also ==
- Mickey Mouse (film series)
