= The Ugly Duckling =

Fairy tale by Hans Christian Andersen

- Short story by Hans Christian Andersen
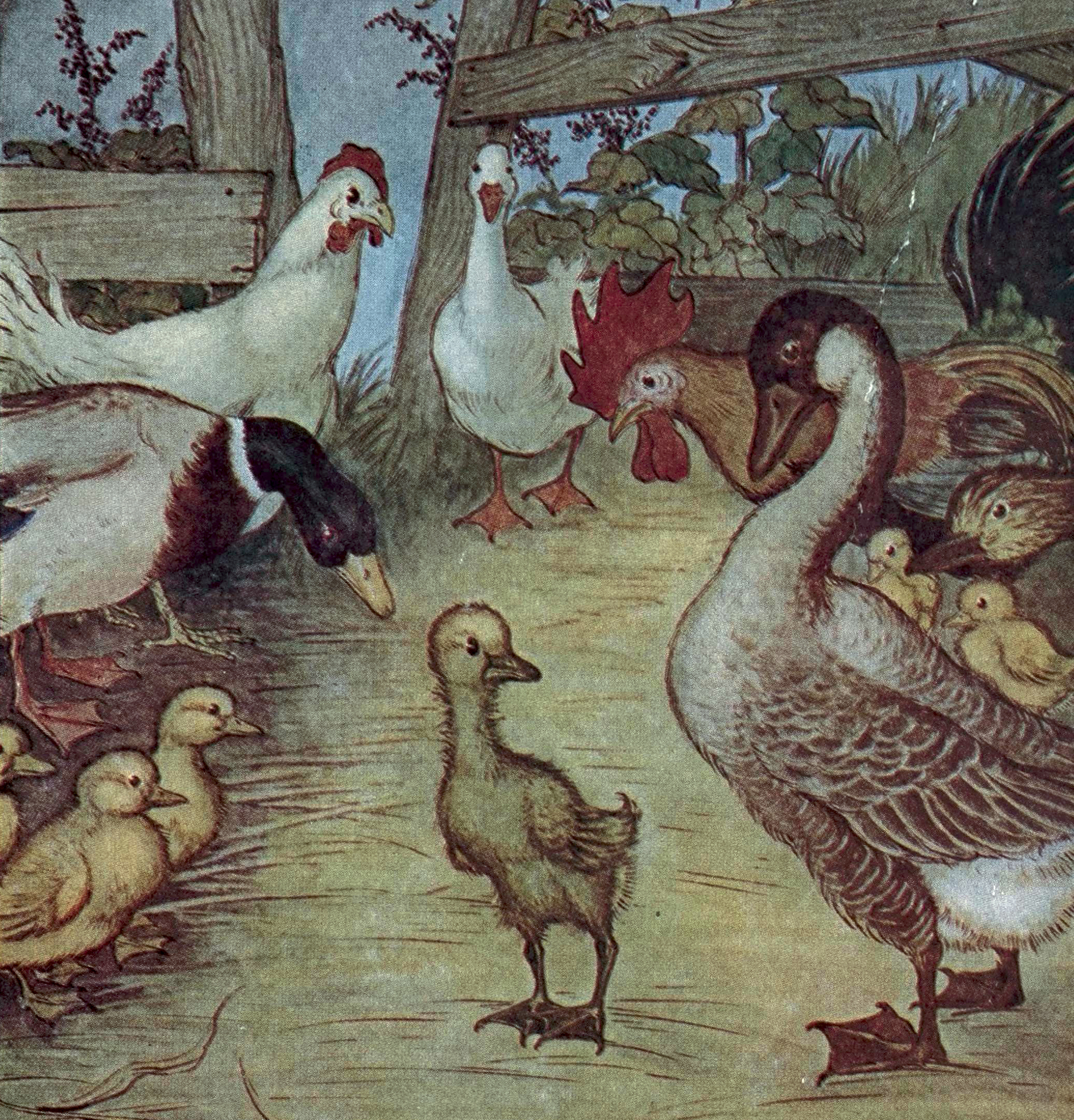
- Illustration of the "Ugly Duckling" by Milo Winter in 1916
- Original title: Den grimme ælling
- Country: Denmark
- Language: Danish
- Genre: Literary fairy tale

Publication
- Published in: New Fairy Tales. First Volume. First Collection (Nye Eventyr. Første Bind. Første Samling)
- Publication type: Fairy tale collection
- Publisher: C.A. Reitzel
- Media type: Print
- Publication date: 11 November 1843

Chronology
The Sweethearts	—

"The Ugly Duckling" (Danish: Den grimme ælling) is a Danish literary fairy tale by the Danish poet and author Hans Christian Andersen (1805–1875). It was first published on 11 November 1843 in New Fairy Tales. First Volume. First Collection, with three other tales by Andersen in Copenhagen to great critical acclaim. The tale has been adapted to various media, including opera, musical, and animated film. The tale is an original story by Andersen.

== Plot ==
After a mother duck's eggs hatch, one of the ducklings is perceived by the other animals as an ugly little creature and suffers much verbal and physical abuse. One day, he runs away from the barnyard and lives with wild ducks and geese until hunters slaughter the flocks. He finds a home with an old woman, but her cat and hen tease and taunt him mercilessly, and once again he sets off alone.

The duckling sees a flock of migrating wild swans. He is delighted and excited but cannot join them because he is too young, ugly, and unable to fly. When winter arrives, a farmer finds and carries the freezing duckling home but he is frightened by the farmer's noisy children and flees the house. The duckling spends a miserable winter alone outdoors, mostly hiding in a cave on the lake that partly freezes over.

The duckling, now having fully grown and matured, cannot endure a life of solitude and hardship anymore. He decides to throw himself at a flock of swans, feeling that it is better to be killed by such beautiful birds than to live a life of ugliness. The duckling is shocked when the swans welcome and accept him, only to realise by looking at his reflection in the water that he had been not a duckling but a cygnet all this time. The flock takes to the air, and he spreads his wings to take flight with the rest of his new family.

== Commentaries and criticism ==
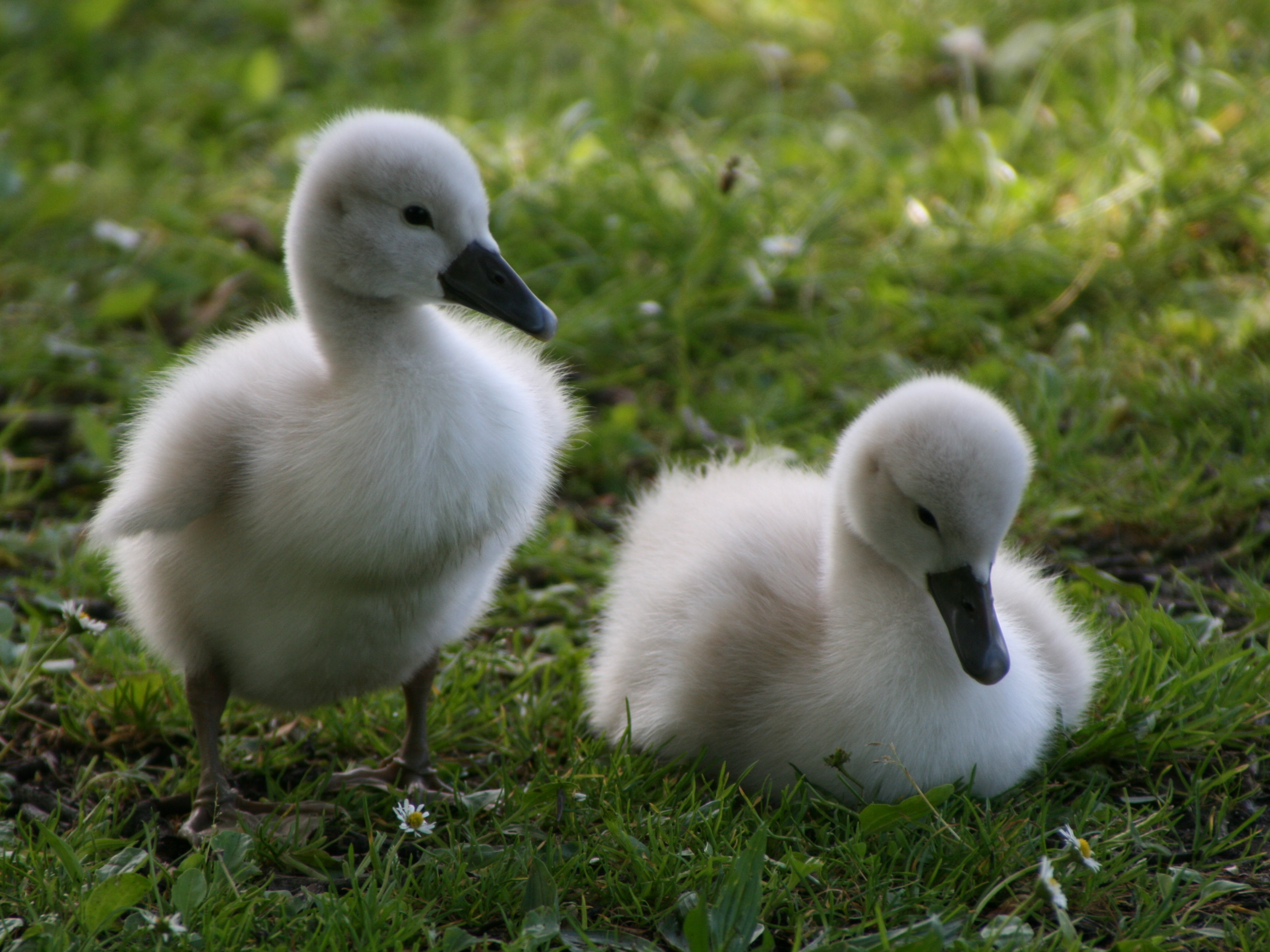
A pair of young swans (or cygnets)

In reviewing Hans Christian Andersen: A New Life by biographer Jens Andersen, British literary critic Anne Chisholm writes "Andersen himself was a tall, ugly boy with a big nose and big feet, and when he grew up with a beautiful singing voice and a passion for the theater, he was cruelly teased and mocked by other children".

Speculation suggests that Andersen was the illegitimate son of Prince Christian Frederik (later King Christian VIII of Denmark), and found this out sometime before he wrote the book, and then that being a swan in the story was a metaphor not just for inner beauty and talent but also for secret royal lineage.

According to Carole Rosen, the story was inspired in part by Andersen's friend Jenny Lind.

== Variations ==
An alternate version of the tale ("The Blue Hen's Chicken") was included in Joel Chandler Harris's Mr. Rabbit at Home. A Sequel to Little Mr. Thimblefinger and His Queer Country (1895). Since the story stops at the moment of the birth of the puddle duckling within the family of chicks, the message of the tale could be totally different, focusing on the "bad temper" and the snobbery of the Blue Hen who thus - having found herself with such an anomalous son - is punished by ending up on everyone's lips and constantly being pointed at.

== Adaptations ==
=== Animation ===
Disney's 1931 version

Disney's 1939 version

The tale was adapted to a variety of media. Films based on the tale include two Silly Symphonies animated shorts produced by Walt Disney called The Ugly Duckling. The first was produced in 1931 in black and white, and a remake in 1939 in Technicolor. The latter film won the 1939 Academy Award for Best Short Subject (Cartoons), and was the last Silly Symphony to be made. The main difference between the Andersen story and the Disney version is that, in the latter, the little bird's ordeal lasts for only a few minutes, not for months. In 1936, the Fleischer brothers adapted the story for their animated short "The Little Stranger", reversing the story by having an odd chick born into a family of ducks.

In 1932, Yasuji Murata directed Ahiru no ko (The Ugly Duckling), a 15-minute Japanese short animated film based on the tale.

In 1956, the Soviet animation studio Soyuzmultfilm produced its 19-minute version of The Ugly Duckling. The anime Princess Tutu is about a duck that turns into a swan-like ballerina. The 1954 Tom and Jerry cartoon Downhearted Duckling is also based on the famous story.

In the US animated TV series The Adventures of Rocky and Bullwinkle and Friends (1959-1964), the "Fractured Fairy Tales" subseries has multiple episodes based on the Ugly Duckling.

The Flint the Time Detective episode "Nightcap" has Flint's group and Petra Fina's group encountering the Ugly Duckling when they are brought into Hans Christian Anderson's dreams by the titular Time Shifter.

=== Music ===
The tale has seen various musical adaptations. In 1914, the Russian composer Sergei Prokofiev composed a work for voice and piano based on Nina Meshcherskaya's adaptation of the tale and, in 1932, arranged the work for voice and orchestra. This was transcribed by Lev Konov in 1996, and his opera was a great success in Russia. Other musical versions include the song "The Ugly Duckling" composed by Frank Loesser and sung by Danny Kaye for the 1952 Charles Vidor musical film Hans Christian Andersen, and Honk!, a musical based on the tale which was produced in Britain and won an Olivier Award. The tale was adapted into a musical by Gail Deschamps and Paul Hamilton. In 1998, the musical played the Piccolo Spoleto for seventeen days. Stephin Merritt set the story as "The Ugly Little Duck" in his musical "My Life As A Fairy Tale" in 2005, released with other Andersen inspired pieces on Showtunes .

=== Books ===
In 1999, Jerry Pinkney adapted the story as a children's picture book.

== See also ==
- List of works by Hans Christian Andersen
- The Fox and the Stork
- Ugly duckling theorem, in philosophical logic, arguing that classification is not possible without bias
- Henny Penny
- Bullying
- Social alienation
- Peer pressure
- Conformity
- Herd behavior
- Developmental delay
- Don't judge a book by its cover
