= Riley Thomson =

American animator and comics artist

- Born: Riley A. Thomson Jr. October 5, 1912; Alhambra, California, U.S.
- Died: January 26, 1960 (aged 47); California, U.S.
- Other name: Riley Thompson
- Occupations: Animator, comics artist
- Years active: 1930–1960
- Employer(s): Leon Schlesinger Productions (1935-1936); Walt Disney Productions (1936-1950); Western Publishing (1950-1953); Walter Lantz Productions (1957-1960)

Riley A. Thomson Jr. (October 5, 1912 – January 26, 1960) was an American animator and comics artist who spent most of his career working with Walt Disney films and characters. He directed six Disney short films including The Nifty Nineties and Symphony Hour.

== Career ==
Thomson began his career in 1930 at the ill-fated studio of Romer Grey. In 1935, he joined Leon Schlesinger Productions (Warner Bros.) as an animator. While there he worked on Merrie Melodies cartoons and focused on the character Porky Pig. The following year Thomson went to work at Walt Disney Productions. He was first an animator and worked on Mickey Mouse, Silly Symphonies, and Donald Duck short films. He also worked on the feature-length film Snow White and the Seven Dwarfs (1937) and "The Sorcerer's Apprentice" segment of Fantasia (1940).

After working on Fantasia Thomson moved to the story department where he became a writer and director. He directed the short films Put-Put Troubles (1940), The Little Whirlwind (1941), The Nifty Nineties (1941), the 1941 remake of Orphans' Benefit, Mickey's Birthday Party (1942), and Symphony Hour (1942). He also received story credits for They're Off (1948) and Dude Duck (1951). (The latter misspells his surname as "Thompson.")

In 1950, Thomson moved into the field of comics. He worked for Western Publishing from 1950 to 1953 drawing for several different comic books. His work mainly included Disney comics featuring Mickey Mouse, Donald Duck, Pluto, Chip 'n' Dale, Grandma Duck, and Jaq & Gus. He also drew Woody Woodpecker comics.

Throughout the 1950s, Thomson drew comic strips for the Disney Studios including Uncle Remus and His Tales of Br'er Rabbit (based on the 1946 film Song of the South) and the Mickey Mouse daily newspaper strip.

Thomson returned to animation in 1957 and worked for Walter Lantz Productions until his death in 1960.
