= The Wise Little Hen =

1934 Silly Symphony cartoon

- Theatrical release poster
- Directed by: Wilfred Jackson
- Produced by: Walt Disney
- Starring: Clarence Nash; Pinto Colvig; Florence Gill
- Music by: Leigh Harline
- Animation by: Archie Robin; Clyde Geronimi; Art Babbitt; Louie Schmitt; Ugo D'Orsi; Frenchy de Tremaudan; Wolfgang Reitherman; Dick Huemer
- Production company: Walt Disney Productions
- Distributed by: United Artists
- Release dates: May 3, 1934 (Carthay Circle Theater); June 9, 1934
- Running time: 7 minutes (one reel)
- Language: English

The Wise Little Hen is a 1934 Walt Disney produced Silly Symphonies animated short film, based on the fable The Little Red Hen. The film features the debut of Donald Duck, dancing to "The Sailor's Hornpipe". Donald and his friend Peter Pig try to avoid work by faking stomach aches until Mrs. Hen teaches them the value of labor.

== Plot ==
The Wise Little Hen of the title is looking for someone to help her plant her corn for the winter. Peter Pig and Donald Duck both feign belly aches to get out of the chore, since they would rather play than work. With help from her chicks, she plants it herself.

Harvest time comes; again, Peter and Donald claim belly aches, but the hen sees through this when boards of their clubhouse fall off showing their little act when they shake hands with each other for evading responsibility. Upon wising up to their ruse, she and her chicks wink at each other upon knowing what to do with Peter and Donald later. She cooks up a tantalizing assortment of corn dishes, and heads over to Peter and Donald to help her eat them, but before she can open her mouth, they already fake their belly aches.

Once she asks them to help her eat the corn, they snap out of their façade and are excited to eat, but all she gives them is castor oil. As the hen and her chicks eat the corn themselves, Peter and Donald repent with all their might by kicking each other in the rump.

== Cast ==
- Florence Gill - The Wise Little Hen
- Clarence Nash - Donald Duck, Peter Pig
- Pinto Colvig - Peter Pig (moaning noises)

== Production ==
Though distributor United Artists gave June 9, 1934 as the cartoon's release date, it was actually first shown on May 3, 1934, at the Carthay Circle Theatre in Los Angeles for a benefit program, while it was later given its official debut on June 7 at the Radio City Music Hall in New York City as a short subject to its showing of Sisters Under the Skin.

This cartoon featured the first appearance of Clarence Nash in a Disney production. Nash had been a performer in Chautauqua and vaudeville during the 1920s and later met Wilfred Jackson who wanted Nash to provide bird sounds for a cartoon. During the call, Nash performed a rendition of "Mary Had a Little Lamb" as a duck, and Jackson sent the music into Walt Disney's office. Disney himself proclaimed "[t]hat's our talking duck".

The short was animated by Art Babbitt, Dick Huemer, Clyde Geronimi, Louie Schmitt, and Frenchy de Tremaudan (with assistance from a group of junior animators headed by Ben Sharpsteen) and directed by Wilfred Jackson. Animation on the hen was done by Wolfgang Reitherman and supervised by Ben Sharpsteen. Art Babbitt worked on Peter Pig and Donald Duck. Ward Kimball worked as an inbetweener on this short. The song featured in the short, "Help Me Plant My Corn" was written by Leigh Harline.

== Theatrical release ==
The Wise Little Hen had its world premiere as the underbill to Gulliver Mickey at the Carthay Circle Theater in Los Angeles, California, on May 3, 1934.

== Adaptations ==
The Silly Symphony Sunday comic strip ran a three-month-long adaptation of The Wise Little Hen from September 16 to December 16, 1934. The story was adapted by Ted Osborne and Al Taliaferro, and it also was Donald Duck's first appearance in Disney comics.

The 1962 storybook Walt Disney's Story Land: 55 Favorite Stories featured an adaptation of the cartoon called "Mrs. Cackle's Corn". In this version, Clara Cluck is telling the story. By 1962, Donald Duck was thought unsuitable for a bit part in a fairy tale, so they use Daniel Duck instead. Patsy Pig was substituted for Peter Pig.

== Analysis ==
Dr. Tracey Mollet suggests that the short's narrative reflects the economic reality of the time, the Great Depression, and President Roosevelt's efforts to bolster the agricultural sector. Mollet surmises that Peter Pig and Donald Duck's actions, not helping to cultivate and harvest crops, is a rejection of "early New Deal policy of self-sufficiency in farming". The short reinforces the belief in New Deal policy by having Donald and Peter pay a consequence for their rugged individualism by being fed castor oil as the Hen and her chicks eat their crops. The featured song also draws upon contemporary elements as it references the "harsh weather [that] had antagonized the crises in the rural sector" across the 1933-1934 winter as the Hen seeks to grow corn "so she is 'not left short when winter comes again'". The short's end reinforces the "self-sufficiency of the hen" in contrast to "Donald and Peter's laziness [which] is punished as they are left hungry".

== Home media ==
The short has been released several times on home media. The first release was in 1986 on Betamax on Donald Duck Volume 1. It was released in 1989 on VHS, Beta, and Laserdisc on Mickey Mouse & Donald Duck Volume 2. It was re-released on those same three formats in 1991 on Donald Duck's 50th Birthday.

It was released on December 4, 2001, on Walt Disney Treasures: Silly Symphonies - The Historic Musical Animated Classics, and on May 18, 2004, on Walt Disney Treasures: The Chronological Donald, Volume One: 1934-1941.

The film's copyright was renewed in 1961, so it will enter the public domain on January 1, 2030.
