= Ted Osborne =

Creator of Walt Disney Cartoon Characters

- Osborne at Disney Studio in the 1930s.
- Born: Theodore H. Osborne; February 6, 1900 Oklahoma, U.S.
- Died: March 12, 1968 (aged 68) San Mateo County, California, U.S.
- Area: writer
- Pseudonym: Ted Osborne

Theodore H. Osborne (February 6, 1900 – March 12, 1968) was an American writer of comics, radio shows and animated films, remembered for his contributions to the creation and refinement, during the 1930s, of Walt Disney cartoon characters.

== Biography ==
Ted Osborne was born in Oklahoma. He spent 1931–1940 at the Walt Disney Studio as a story writer and also wrote for several of the Disney comic strips.

Osborne, a writer for Los Angeles radio station KHJ, was hired by Disney in October 1931 to develop a Mickey Mouse radio show. That project never materialized, and Osborne moved to the studio's Story Department.

In 1933, Osborne moved from Story to the comic strip department, to work with artist Floyd Gottfredson on the popular Mickey Mouse comic strip. Gottfredson drew the strip and wrote the plots; Osborne broke the plots down into strips and wrote the dialogue.

Osborne's first Sunday Mickey Mouse strip was published on January 29, 1933, starting the story "Lair of Wolf Barker." He took over the daily strip as of February 11, with the story "Pluto and the Dogcatcher". Osborne scripted many memorable Mickey stories from 1933 to 1937 which were later adapted into the popular Big Little Books of the 1930s and 1940s, including "The Mail Pilot", "Editor-in-Grief", "Mickey Mouse Joins the Foreign Legion", "The Seven Ghosts", "Island in the Sky" and "Monarch of Medioka".

In April 1933, Earl Duvall, who had been writing and drawing the Silly Symphony Sunday comic strip for Disney, abruptly left the company, leaving the strip without a writer. Osborne stepped in and continued the strip, working with artist Al Taliaferro. The pair wrote a number of adaptations of Silly Symphony animated shorts, including 1934's The Wise Little Hen and 1936's Three Little Wolves.

In 1936, Taliaferro was allowed to use Silly Symphony as a tryout for a solo comic strip featuring Donald Duck, with Osborne as writer. The series ran for more than a year, from August 30, 1936 to December 5, 1937. In October 1937, Osborne and Taliaferro introduced Donald's triplet nephews, Huey, Dewey and Louie, for a six-week story. The irrepressible youngsters made such a hit in the comics page that they were introduced in a 1938 cartoon short, Donald's Nephews, and became a crucial part of Donald's supporting cast.

Taliaferro was given the green light to create a solo Donald Duck comic strip in 1938, but by that point, Osborne had left the comic strip department. In late 1937, Osborne was moved back to the Story Department to work on Bambi, a feature film project that was ultimately released in 1942. His last Silly Symphony strip ran on Sunday, December 5, 1937; his last Mickey Mouse daily was published on February 5, 1938; and his last Mickey Sunday ran on March 11, 1938.

He was succeeded by writer Merrill De Maris on both Mickey Mouse and Silly Symphony. When his Bambi team disbanded in 1940, Gottfredson chose to keep De Maris as his permanent writer, and Osborne left the Disney studio.

After leaving the studio, Osborne managed a photographic studio in Hollywood. He died in San Carlos, California on March 12, 1968.
