= Light Cavalry Overture =

Piece of music by Franz von Suppé

Light Cavalry Overture is the overture to Franz von Suppé’s operetta Light Cavalry (German: Leichte Kavallerie), premiered in Vienna in 1866. Although the whole operetta is rarely performed or recorded, the overture is one of Suppé's most popular compositions, and has achieved a life of its own, divorced from the opera of which it originally formed a part. Many orchestras around the world have the piece in their repertoire, and the main theme of the overture has been quoted numerous times by musicians, in cartoons and other media.

== Recordings ==
The overture has been recorded many times, including by these notable conductors:

- John Barbirolli and the Hallé Orchestra (Archipel Records - ARPCD0373)
- Charles Dutoit and the Montreal Symphony Orchestra (Decca - 414408)
- Arthur Fiedler and the Boston Pops Orchestra (RCA)
- James Allen Gähres and the Ulm Philharmonic (SCM 66222)
- Herbert von Karajan and the Berlin Philharmonic (DG - E4777099)
- Erich Kleiber and the Berlin Philharmonic (BPH0603)
- Neville Marriner and the Academy of St Martin in the Fields (EMI 5856242)
- Riccardo Muti and the Vienna Philharmonic (EMI CDC 556 336-2)
- Paul Paray and the Detroit Symphony Orchestra (Philips)
- Gennady Rozhdestvensky and the Moscow Radio Symphony Orchestra (Melodiya - MELCD1001662)
- Georg Solti and the Vienna Philharmonic (Decca CS6146)
- George Weldon and the Philharmonia Orchestra (Columbia DX 1873)

== Media ==
F. von Suppé's Light Cavalry Overture
Franz von Suppé's overture to the opera Leichte Kavallerie, played by the United States Marine Band and directed by Colonel John R. Bourgeois. Date of performance: 1993.
