= Steinn Ármann Magnússon =

Icelandic actor

- Born: October 28, 1964
- Died: August 21, 2026 (aged 61)
- Children: 2

Steinn Ármann Magnússon (28 October 1968 – 21 August 2026) was an Icelandic actor and voice actor, best known as being part of the comedy duo Radíusbræður along with Davíð Þór Jónsson.

== Career ==
Steinn got his acting degree at the Icelandic Drama School from which he graduated in 1989. Steinn made his on screen debut in 1988, when he played one of the lead roles in the tv-series The Irresistibles.

Steinn also had a short musical career as bassist in the band Kátir piltar.

Steinn also dubbed a lot of cartoons into Icelandic, he was among others the Icelandic voice of Pete in the Goofy franchise, Slinky in the Toy Story franchise and Mack in the Cars franschise.

== Personal Life ==
Steinn was married to Jenný Berglind Rúnarsdóttir. They had 2 sons together.

== Selected filmography ==
- 1988: The Irresistibles
- 1992: Wallpaper: An Erotic Love Story – Sveppi
- 1994: Sail Boats of Heaven – Símon
- 1995: Private Lives – Skúli Hrímfjörð
- 2002: Stella for Office – Hróbjartur
- 2007: No Network – Helgi
- 2008: Black Angels – Guðni

=== Icelandic dubbing ===
- 1996: Toy Story – Slinky
- 1996: A Goofy Movie – Pete
- 1997: Hercules – Nessus, Apollo and Cyclops
- 2002: Help! I'm a Fish – Shark
- 2003: Malcolm in the Middle – Hal
- 2006: Cars – Mack
- 2012: Ice Age 4 – Captain Gutt
- 2015: Inside Out – Fritz and Clown's Joy
- 2016: Zootopia – Frantic Pig, Bucky Oryx-Antlerson and Mouse Foreman
- 2018: Ralph Breaks the Internet – Double Dan
- 2022: Puss in Boots: The Last Wish – Wolf
- 2026: The Sheep Detectives – Ham and Sir Ritchfield
