= Dream On Silly Dreamer =

2005 film by Don Lund

- Film poster
- Directed by: Dan Lund
- Written by: Dan Lund
- Produced by: Tony West
- Starring: Andreas Deja; Barry Cook; Carmen Sanderson; Dorse Lanpher; Jacqueline Sanchez
- Narrated by: Richard Cook
- Edited by: Dan Lund
- Music by: Mike Brassell; Kuno Schmid
- Production company: WestLund Productions
- Distributed by: WestLund Productions
- Release dates: January 31, 2005 (Animex); February 14, 2006 (DVD)
- Running time: 40 minutes
- Country: United States
- Language: English

Dream On Silly Dreamer is a 2005 American documentary film directed by Dan Lund and produced by Tony West. Lund and West were both special effects animators at Walt Disney Feature Animation, and the film chronicles the rise and fall of traditional animation at The Walt Disney Company from 1980 to 2005.

== About the film ==
The film uses interviews from Disney animation personnel including lead animator Andreas Deja, animator/director Barry Cook, and longtime ink-and-paint artist Carmen Sanderson, among others. Most of these interviews were done following the layoff of most of Disney's traditional animation artists in March 2002. The Disney corporate executives had decided to produce only computer-animated films following the underperformance of traditionally animated films such as The Emperor's New Groove (2000) and Atlantis: The Lost Empire (2001) in the face of the successful output of Pixar.

Dream On Silly Dreamer focuses on the effects of both the Disney studio's successes and failures on the Feature Animation employees, particularly their feelings on the competition from former Disney executive Jeffrey Katzenberg's establishment of DreamWorks Animation and on the layoffs. The film uses animated bookends and interstitials, done in a format reminiscent of Disney's Winnie the Pooh short films, of a young "dreamer" who achieves his dream to be a Disney animator with the unexpected real-life results.

The film's score was composed and produced by Mike Brassell and Kuno Schmid.

== Release and reception ==
Produced and released independently by Lund and West's WestLund Productions, Dream On, Silly Dreamer debuted at the Animex International Festival of Animation in the United Kingdom in January 2005, and played at other film festivals throughout the year. WestLund released the film on DVD the following year, along with extended versions of several of the film's scenes and footage of its premieres at several film festivals. A review by Steve Daily of Entertainment Weekly gave the film a B+ grade, likening it to "a real-life version of The Office.

The film was produced and released in the midst of a public corporate battle between The Walt Disney Company's CEO Michael Eisner and Roy E. Disney, formerly a Disney board member and the chairman of Feature Animation. Roy Disney, who was calling for Eisner's resignation in the face of a number of issues with his management, including laying off the traditional animation unit, praised Dream on Silly Dreamer, saying in a statement that "I have to say how very human a face it puts on an institutional tragedy."

Following Eisner's resignation in 2005, Roy E. Disney returned to the Disney board, and the studio reinstated a traditional feature animation unit following The Walt Disney Company's acquisition of Pixar in 2006. It was eventually disbanded again after The Princess and the Frog (2009) and Winnie the Pooh (2011) underperformed at the box office.

== See also ==
- The Pixar Story, a 2007 documentary film chronicling the history of Pixar.
- Waking Sleeping Beauty, a 2009 documentary by Disney producer Don Hahn and former executive Peter Schneider on the history of Disney Animation between 1980 and 1994.
