= Walt Disney Animation Studios =

American animation studio

Coordinates: 34°09′20″N 118°19′23″W

- Logo used since March 25, 2007

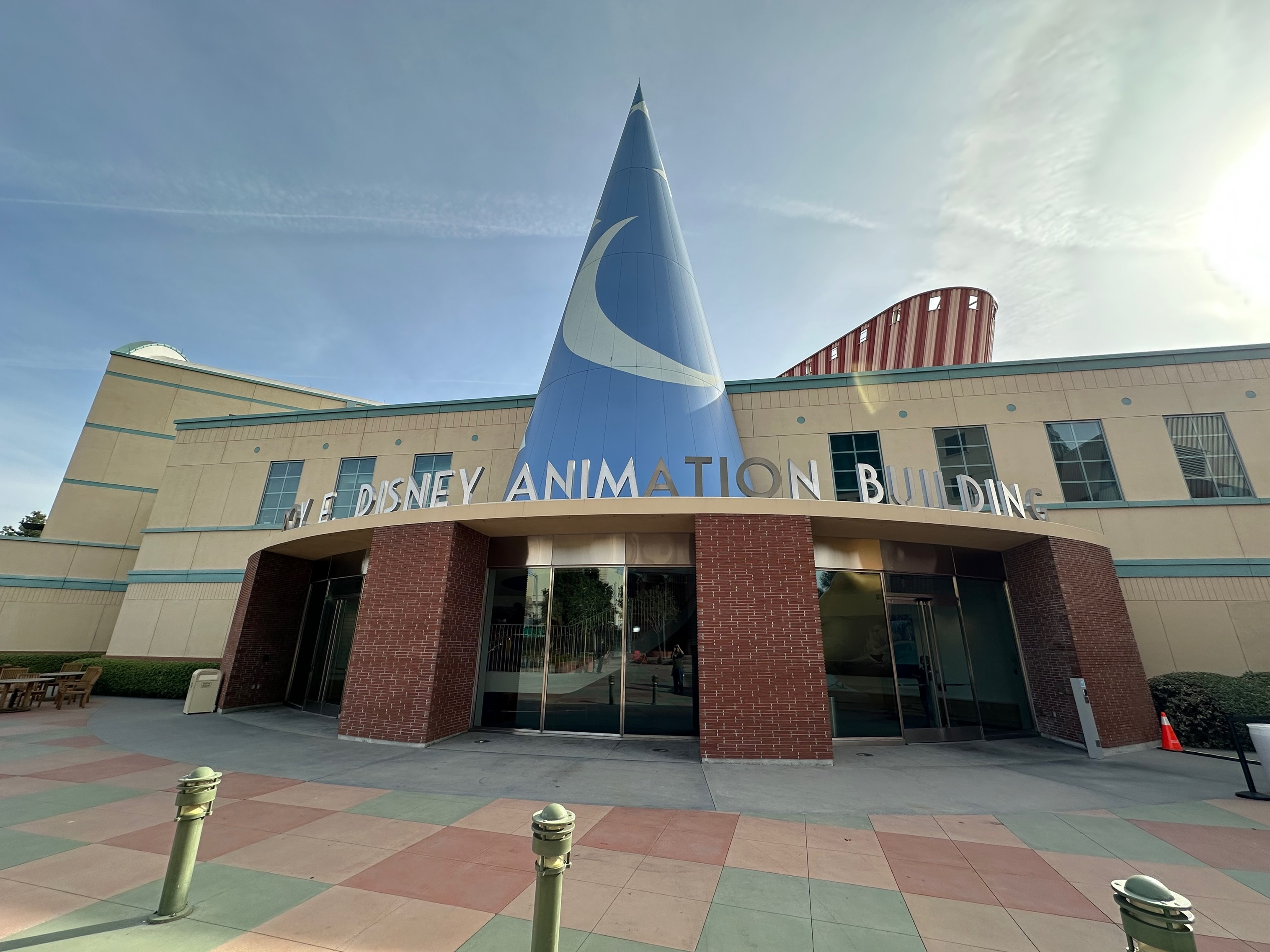
- The studio's headquarters at the Roy E. Disney Animation Building in Burbank, pictured in 2023
- Formerly: Disney Brothers Cartoon Studio (1923–1926); Walt Disney Studio (1926–1928); Disney Cartoons (1928–1929); Walt Disney Productions (1929–1986); Walt Disney Feature Animation (1986–2007)
- Type: Division
- Industry: Motion pictures; Animation
- Predecessor: Laugh-O-Gram Studio; Screen Gems
- Founded: October 16, 1923; 103 years ago
- Founders: Walt Disney; Roy O. Disney
- Headquarters: Walt Disney Studios, Burbank, California, U.S.
- Area served: Worldwide
- Key people: Jared Bush (CCO); Clark Spencer (president)
- Products: Animated films; Animated series; Animated short films
- Parent: Walt Disney Studios
- Website: disneyanimation.com

Walt Disney Animation Studios (WDAS), sometimes shortened to Disney Animation, is an American animation studio which produces animated feature films and short films for the Walt Disney Company. The studio's current production logo features a scene from its first synchronized sound cartoon, Steamboat Willie (1928). Founded on October 16, 1923, by brothers Walt and Roy O. Disney after the closure of Laugh-O-Gram Studio, it is the longest-running animation studio in the world. It is currently organized as a division of Walt Disney Studios and is headquartered at the Roy E. Disney Animation Building at the Walt Disney Studios lot in Burbank, California. Since its foundation, the studio has produced 64 feature films, from Snow White and the Seven Dwarfs (1937)—which is also the first hand-drawn animated feature film—to Zootopia 2 (2025), and hundreds of short films. The studio is one of Disney's three feature animation studios, alongside Pixar Animation Studios and 20th Century Animation.

Founded as Disney Brothers Cartoon Studio (DBCS) in 1923, renamed Walt Disney Studio (WDS) in 1926 and incorporated as Walt Disney Productions (WDP) in 1929, the studio was dedicated to producing short films until it entered feature production in 1934, resulting in Snow White and the Seven Dwarfs, one of the first full-length animated feature films and the first U.S.-based one. In 1986, during a large corporate restructuring, Walt Disney Productions, which had grown from a single animation studio into an international media conglomerate, was renamed the Walt Disney Company and the animation studio became Walt Disney Feature Animation (WDFA) in order to differentiate it from the company's other divisions. Its current name was adopted in 2007, one year after Pixar Animation Studios was acquired by Disney.

For many people, Disney Animation is synonymous with animation, for "in no other medium has a single company's practices been able to dominate aesthetic norms" to such an overwhelming extent. The studio was recognized as the premier American animation studio for much of its existence and was "for many decades the undisputed world leader in animated features"; it developed many of the techniques, concepts and principles that became standard practices of traditional animation. The studio also pioneered the art of storyboarding, which is now a standard technique used in both animated and live-action filmmaking, as well as television shows and video games. The studio's catalog of animated features is among Disney's most notable assets, with the stars of its animated shorts—Mickey Mouse, Minnie Mouse, Donald Duck, Daisy Duck, Goofy, and Pluto—becoming recognizable figures in popular culture and mascots for the Walt Disney Company as a whole.

Four of the studio's films—Frozen (2013), Frozen 2 (2019), Moana 2 (2024), and Zootopia 2 (2025)—are all among the 50 highest-grossing films of all time, with the latter one becoming the second-highest-grossing animated feature film of all time and the highest-grossing American-produced animated feature film. By 2013, the studio stated they had no hand-drawn animated feature films in development as a result of their computer animated films performing better at the box office, and had laid off a large portion of their hand-drawn animators. However, the studio stated in 2019 and 2023 that they are open to proposals from filmmakers for future hand-drawn feature projects. In addition, in April 2022, Eric Goldberg, a hand-drawn animator who has been working with the studio since 1992, confirmed plans within the Disney studio to return to hand-drawn animation.

== History ==
=== 1923–1929: Founding and early years ===
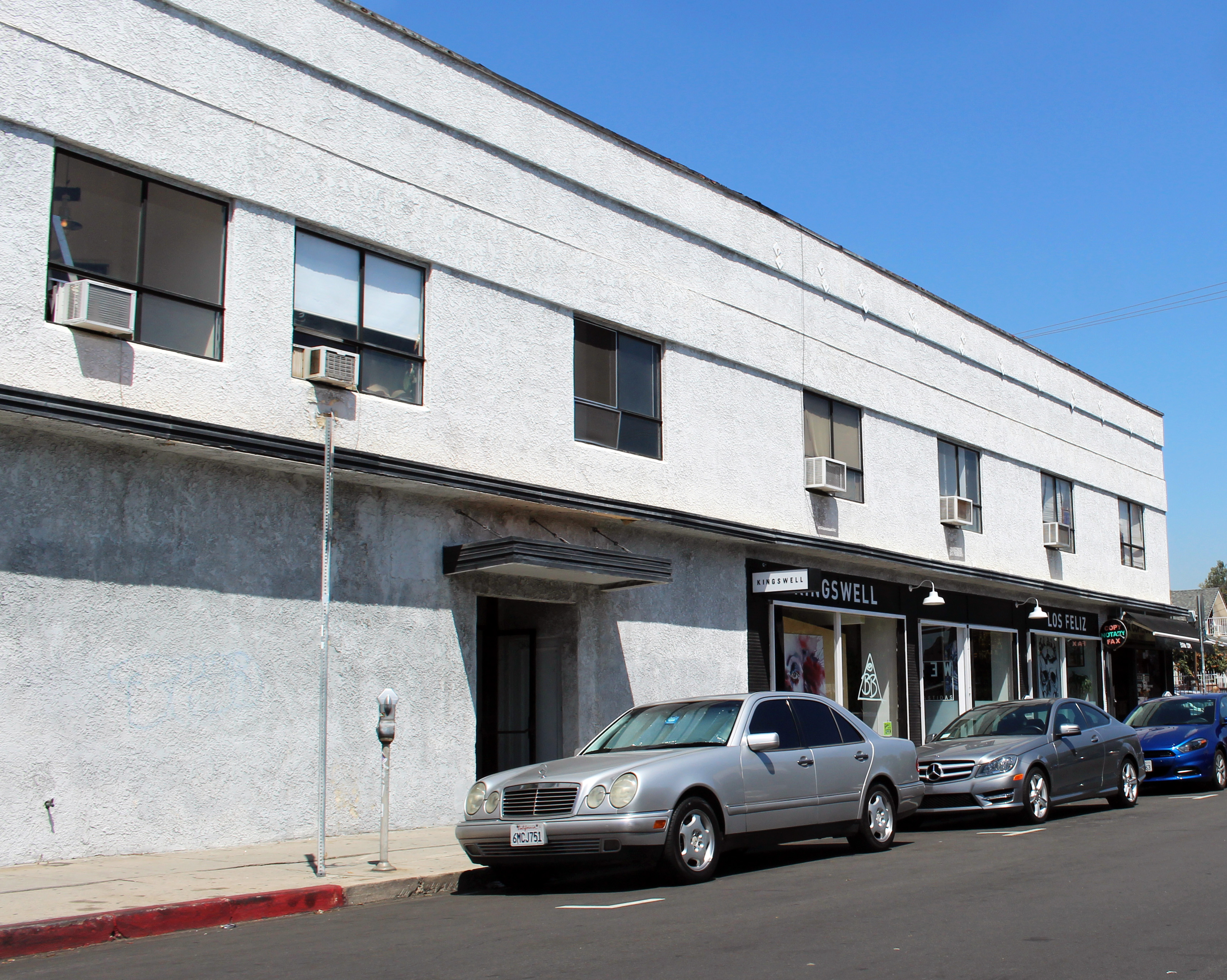
The building on Kingswell Avenue in Los Feliz which was home to the studio from 1923 to 1926.

Kansas City, Missouri, natives Walt Disney and Roy O. Disney founded Disney Brothers Cartoon Studio in Los Angeles in 1923 after the bankruptcy of the Laugh-O-Gram Studio. They got their start producing a series of silent Alice Comedies short films, a pioneer of the live-action animated film genre. The Alice Comedies were picked up by Margaret J. Winkler's Winkler Pictures, who handled production and distribution duties of the studio's films. Upon relocating to California, the Disney brothers initially started working in their uncle Robert Disney's garage at 4406 Kingswell Avenue in the Los Feliz neighborhood of Los Angeles, then, in October 1923, formally launched their studio in a small office on the rear side of a real estate agency's office at 4651 Kingswell Avenue. In February 1924, the studio moved next door to office space of its own at 4649 Kingswell Avenue. In 1925, Disney put down a deposit on a new location at 2719 Hyperion Avenue in the nearby Silver Lake neighborhood, which came to be known as the Hyperion Studio to distinguish it from the studio's other locations, and, in January 1926, the studio moved there and took on the name Walt Disney Studio.

The Walt Disney Studio at the time solely handled animation services, while all other aspects of production were handled by Winkler Pictures; Winkler eventually dropped their distribution services and found a distributor in Universal Pictures. The all-animated Oswald the Lucky Rabbit, starting in 1927, was a great success for Universal Pictures, causing the studio's reputation to skyrocket. Charles Mintz wanted to force Disney to accept a lower advance payment for each Oswald short as a cost-cutting measure. Disney refused and, as Universal owned the rights to Oswald rather than Disney, Mintz set up his own animation studio to produce Oswald cartoons. Most of Disney's staff was hired away by Mintz to move over once Disney's Oswald contract expired in mid-1928.

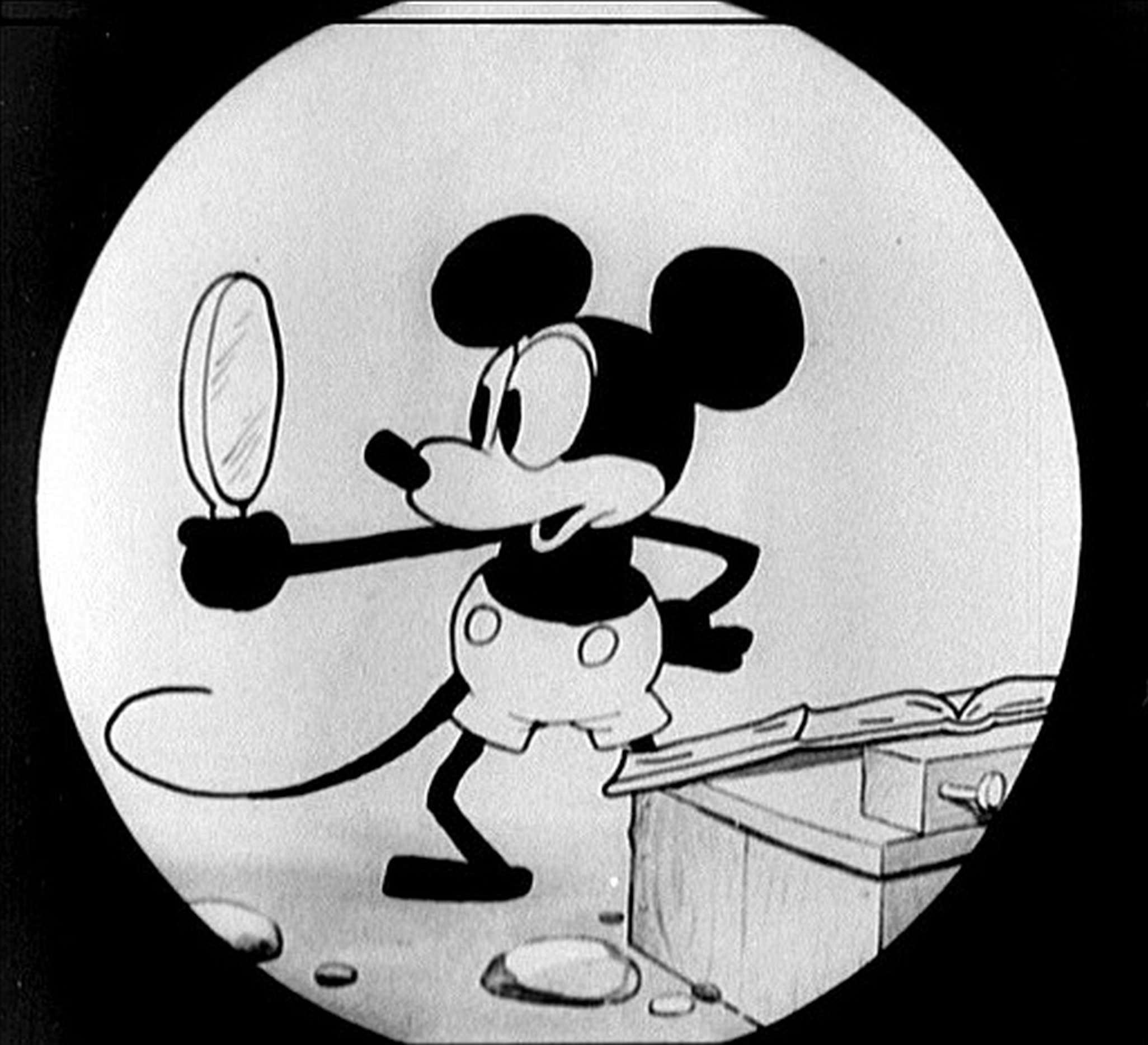
Mickey Mouse in Plane Crazy, the first short film produced with the character as protagonist.

Working in secret while the rest of the staff finished the remaining Oswalds on contract, Disney and his head animator Ub Iwerks led a small handful of loyal staffers in producing cartoons starring a new character named Mickey Mouse, renaming the company Disney Cartoons in the process. The first two Mickey Mouse cartoons, Plane Crazy and The Galloping Gaucho, were previewed in limited engagements during the summer of 1928. For the third Mickey cartoon, however, Disney produced a soundtrack, collaborating with musician Carl Stalling and businessman Pat Powers of Celebrity Productions, who provided Disney with his bootlegged "Cinephone" sound-on-film process. Subsequently, the third Mickey Mouse cartoon, Steamboat Willie, became Disney's first cartoon with synchronized sound and was a major success upon its November 1928 debut at the West 57th Theatre in New York City. The Mickey Mouse series of sound cartoons, distributed by Celebrity Productions, quickly became the most popular cartoon series in the United States.

The Skeleton Dance, the first short in the Silly Symphonies series

A second Disney series of sound cartoons, Silly Symphonies, debuted in 1929 with The Skeleton Dance. In total, five different shorts from the Silly Symphonies series were released by the end of 1929. All were scored by Stalling and involved animation by Iwerks.

=== 1929–1940: Reincorporation, Silly Symphonies and Snow White and the Seven Dwarfs ===
In 1929, disputes over finances between Disney and Powers led to Disney's animation production company, reincorporated on December 16, 1929, as Walt Disney Productions, signing a new distribution contract with Columbia Pictures. Powers, in return, signed Ub Iwerks' studio Animated Pictures, although he would return to Disney in 1940.

Columbia distributed Disney's shorts for two years before the Disney studio entered a new distribution deal with United Artists in 1932. The same year, Disney signed a two-year exclusive deal with Technicolor to utilize its new 3-strip color film process, which allowed for fuller-color reproduction where previous color film processors could not. The result was the Silly Symphony cartoon Flowers and Trees, the first film commercially released in full Technicolor. Flowers and Trees was a major success and all Silly Symphonies were subsequently produced in Technicolor.

By the early 1930s, Walt Disney had realized that the success of animated films depended upon telling emotionally gripping stories that would grab the audience and not let go, and this realization led him to create a separate "story department" with storyboard artists dedicated to story development. With well-developed characters and an interesting story, the 1933 Technicolor Silly Symphony cartoon Three Little Pigs became a major box office and pop culture success, with its theme song "Who's Afraid of the Big Bad Wolf?" becoming a popular chart hit.

In 1934, Walt Disney gathered several key staff members and announced his plans to make his first animated feature film. Despite derision from most of the film industry, who dubbed the production "Disney's Folly", Disney proceeded undaunted into the production of Snow White and the Seven Dwarfs, which would become the first animated feature in English and Technicolor. Considerable training and development went into the production of Snow White and the Seven Dwarfs and the studio greatly expanded, with established animators, artists from other fields and recent college graduates joining the studio to work on the film. The training classes, supervised by head animators such as Les Clark, Norm Ferguson and Art Babbit and taught by Donald W. Graham, an art teacher from the nearby Chouinard Art Institute, had begun at the studio in 1932 and were greatly expanded into orientation training and continuing education classes. In the course of teaching the classes, Graham and the animators created or formalized many of the techniques and processes that became the key tenets and principles of traditional animation. Silly Symphonies such as The Goddess of Spring (1934) and The Old Mill (1937) served as experimentation grounds for new techniques such as the animation of realistic human figures, special effects animation and the use of the multiplane camera, an invention that split animation artwork layers into several planes, allowing the camera to appear to move dimensionally through an animated scene.

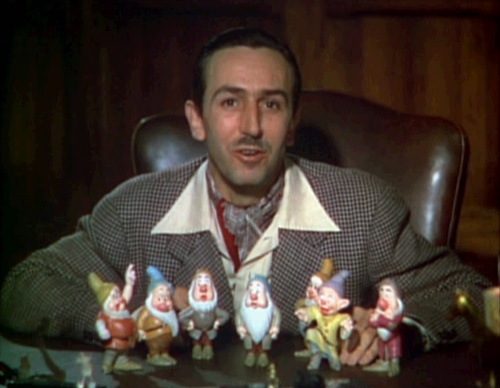
Walt Disney introduces each of the Seven Dwarfs in a scene from the original 1937 Snow White and the Seven Dwarfs theatrical trailer.

Snow White and the Seven Dwarfs cost Disney a then-expensive sum of $1.4 million to complete (including $100,000 on story development alone) and was an unprecedented success when released in February 1938 by RKO Radio Pictures, which had assumed distribution of Disney product from United Artists in 1937. It was briefly the highest-grossing film of all time before the unprecedented success of Gone with the Wind two years later, grossing over $8 million on its initial release, the equivalent of $182,978,720 in 1999 dollars.

During the production of Snow White, work had continued on the Mickey Mouse and Silly Symphonies series of shorts. Mickey Mouse switched to Technicolor in 1935, by which time the series had added several major supporting characters, among them Mickey's dog, Pluto, and their friends Donald Duck and Goofy. Donald, Goofy, and Pluto would all be appearing in series of their own by 1940, and the Donald Duck cartoons eclipsed the Mickey Mouse series in popularity. Silly Symphonies, which garnered seven Academy Awards, ceased in 1939, until the shorts returned to theatres with some re-issues and re-releases.

=== 1940–1948: New feature films, strike and World War II ===
The success of Snow White allowed Disney to build a new, larger studio on Buena Vista Street in Burbank, where the Walt Disney Company remains headquartered to this day. Walt Disney Productions had its initial public offering on April 2, 1940, with Walt Disney as president and Roy Disney as CEO.

The studio launched into the production of new animated features, the first of which was Pinocchio, released in February 1940. Pinocchio was not initially a box-office success. The box office returns from the film's initial release were below both Snow White's unprecedented success and the studio's expectations. Of the film's $2.289 million cost – twice of Snow White – Disney recouped $1 million by late 1940, with studio reports of the film's final original box office take varying between $1.4 million and $1.9 million. However, Pinocchio was a critical success, winning the Academy Award for Best Original Song and Best Original Score, making it the first film of the studio to win not only either Oscar, but both at the same time.

Fantasia, an experimental film produced to an accompanying orchestral arrangement conducted by Leopold Stokowski, was released in November 1940 by Disney itself in a series of limited-seating roadshow engagements. The film cost $2 million to produce and, although the film earned $1.4 million in its roadshow engagements, the high cost ($85,000 per theater) of installing Fantasound placed Fantasia at a greater loss than Pinocchio. RKO assumed distribution of Fantasia in 1941, later reissuing it in severely edited versions over the years. Despite its financial failure, Fantasia was the subject of two Academy Honorary Awards on February 26, 1942 – one for the development of the innovative Fantasound system used to create the film's stereoscopic soundtrack, and the other for Stokowski and his contributions to the film. Fantasia was the final Disney animated film to be completed at the Hyperion Studio of the Walt Disney Studios (Walt Disney Productions) in Los Angeles.

Much of the character animation on these productions and all subsequent features until the late 1970s was supervised by a brain-trust of animators Walt Disney dubbed the "Nine Old Men", many of whom also served as directors and later producers on the Disney features: Frank Thomas, Ollie Johnston, Woolie Reitherman, Les Clark, Ward Kimball, Eric Larson, John Lounsbery, Milt Kahl, and Marc Davis. Other head animators at Disney during this period included Norm Ferguson, Bill Tytla and Fred Moore. The development of the feature animation department created a caste system at the Disney studio: lesser animators (and feature animators in-between assignments) were assigned to work on the short subjects, while animators higher in status such as the Nine Old Men worked on the features. Concern over Walt Disney accepting credit for the artists' work as well as debates over compensation led to many of the newer and lower-ranked animators seeking to unionize the Disney studio.

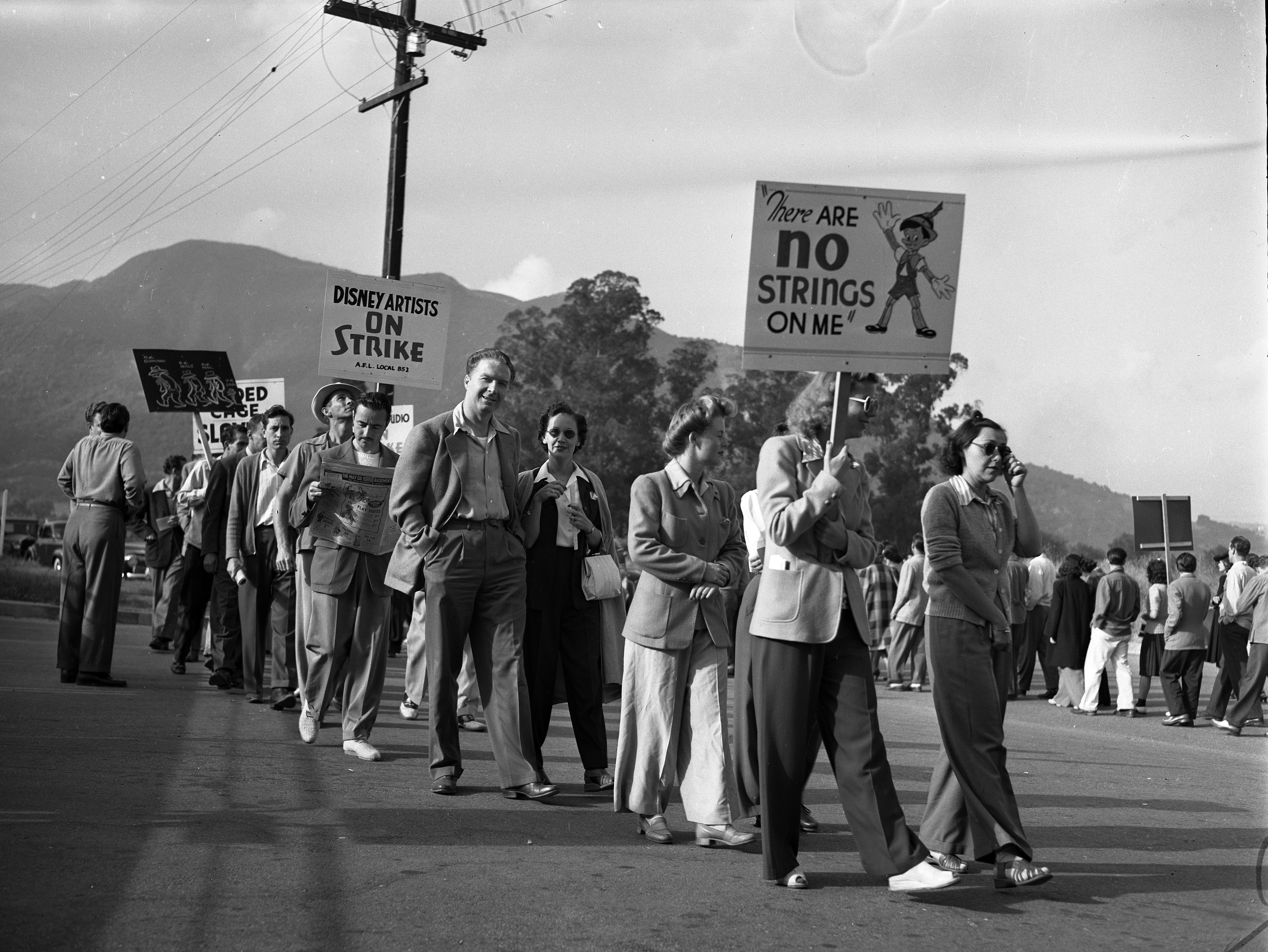
The Disney animators' strike started on May 29, 1941.

A bitter union strike began in May 1941, which was resolved without the angered Walt Disney's involvement in July and August of that year. As Walt Disney Productions was being set up as a union shop, Walt Disney and several studio employees were sent by the U.S. government on a Good Neighbor policy trip to Central and South America. The Disney strike and its aftermath led to an exodus of several animation professionals from the studio, from top-level animators such as Art Babbitt and Bill Tytla to artists better known for their work outside the Disney studio such as Frank Tashlin, Maurice Noble, Walt Kelly, Bill Melendez, and John Hubley. Hubley, along with several other Disney strikers, went on to found the United Productions of America studio, Disney's key animation rival in the 1950s.

Dumbo, in production during the midst of the animators' strike, premiered in October 1941 and proved to be a financial success. The film cost $950,000 to produce, half the cost of Snow White and the Seven Dwarfs, less than a third of the cost of Pinocchio, and two-fifths of the cost of Fantasia. Dumbo eventually grossed $1.6 million during its original release. Dumbo was the first Disney animated film to be completed at the original Animation Building of the Walt Disney Studios (Walt Disney Productions) in Burbank, California. In August 1942, Bambi was released and, as with Pinocchio and Fantasia, did not perform well at the box office. Out of its $1.7 million budget, it grossed $1.64 million.

Production of full-length animated features was temporarily suspended after the release of Bambi. Given the financial failures of some of the recent features and World War II cutting off much of the overseas cinema market, the studio's financiers at the Bank of America would only loan the studio working capital if it temporarily restricted itself to shorts production. Features then in production such as Peter Pan, Alice in Wonderland and Lady and the Tramp were therefore put on hold until after the war. Following the United States' entry into World War II after the attack on Pearl Harbor, the studio housed over 500 U.S. Army soldiers who were responsible for protecting nearby aircraft factories from enemy bombers. In addition, several Disney animators were drafted to fight in the war and the studio was contracted on producing wartime content for every branch of the U.S. military, particularly military training, and civilian propaganda films. From 1942 to 1943, 95 percent of the studio's animation output was for the military. During the war, Disney produced the live-action/animated military propaganda feature Victory Through Air Power (1943), and a series of Latin culture-themed shorts resulting from the 1941 Good Neighbor trip were compiled into two films, Saludos Amigos (1942) and The Three Caballeros (1944).

Saludos Amigos and The Three Caballeros set the template for several other 1940s Disney releases of anthology films: low-budget films composed of animated short subjects with animated or live-action bridging material. These films were Make Mine Music (1946), Fun and Fancy Free (1947), Melody Time (1948) and The Adventures of Ichabod and Mr. Toad (1949). The studio also produced two features, Song of the South (1946) and So Dear to My Heart (1948), which used more expansive live-action stories which still included animated sequences and sequences combining live-action and animated characters. Song of the South received significant controversy for its depiction of racial stereotypes. Shorts production continued during this period as well, with Donald Duck, Goofy, and Pluto cartoons being the main output accompanied by cartoons starring Mickey Mouse, Figaro and, in the 1950s, Chip 'n' Dale and Humphrey the Bear.

In addition, Disney began reissuing the previous features, beginning with re-releases of Snow White in 1944, Pinocchio in 1945, and Fantasia in 1946. This led to a tradition of reissuing the Disney films every seven years, which lasted into the 1990s before being translated into the studio's handling of home video releases. Song of the South was never re-released theatrically by Walt Disney Studios Motion Pictures through the Walt Disney Pictures banner (from 2007 onwards) or distributed through home media platforms by Walt Disney Telecommunications and Non-Theatrical Company (WDTNT) (from 1980 to 1987), Buena Vista Home Entertainment (from 1987 to 2024) and Sony Pictures Home Entertainment (from 2024 onwards), due to the film's controversial legacy.

=== 1948–1966: Return of feature films, Buena Vista, end of shorts, layoffs and Walt's final years ===
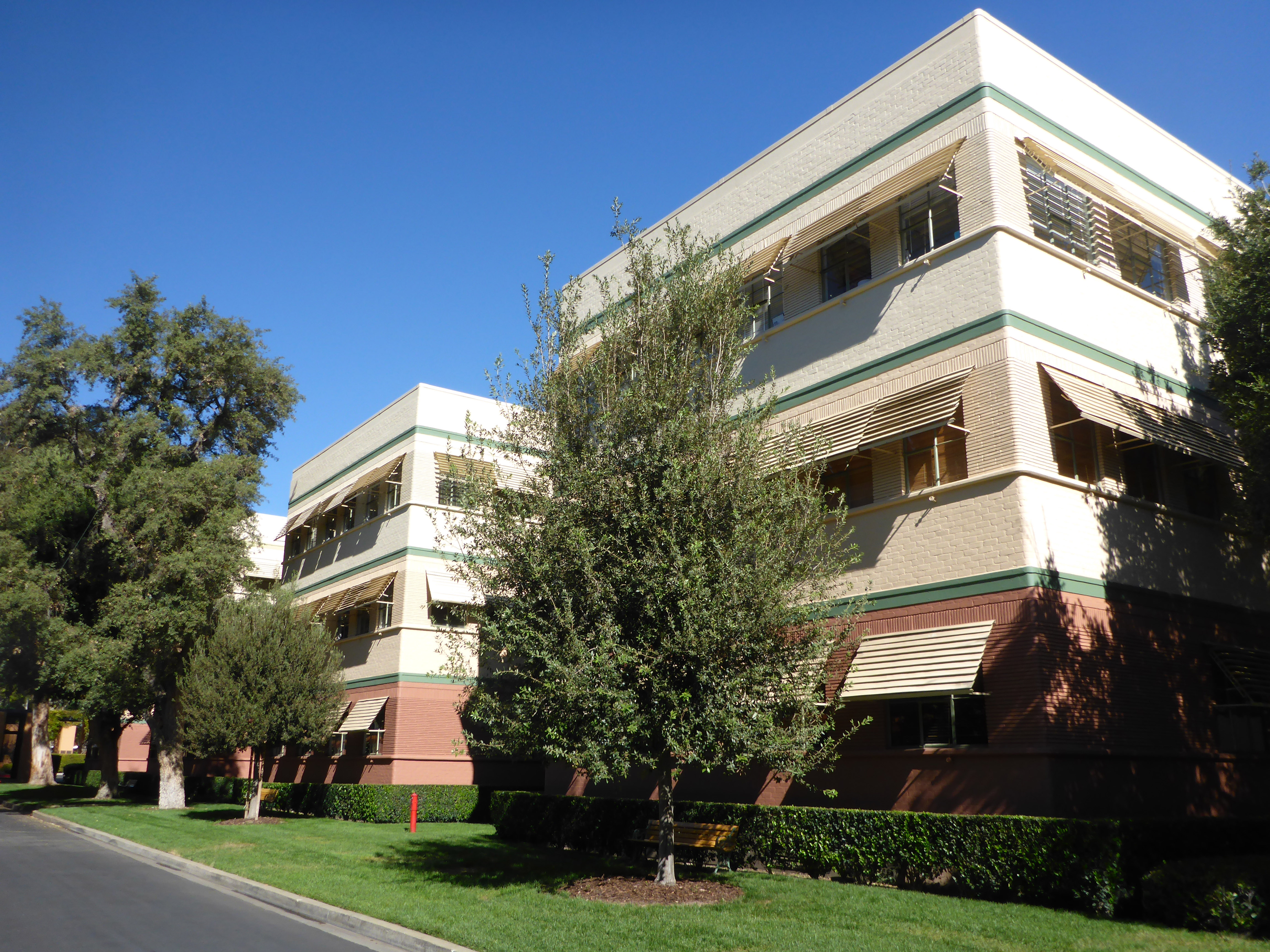
The original Animation Building at the Walt Disney Studios in Burbank, California, the headquarters of the animation department from 1940 to 1985.

In 1948, Disney returned to the production of full-length features with Cinderella, a feature film based on the fairy tale by Charles Perrault. At a cost of nearly $3 million, the future of the studio depended upon the success of this film. Upon its release in 1950, Cinderella proved to be a box-office success, with the profits from the film's release allowing Disney to carry on producing animated features throughout the 1950s. Following its success, production on the in-limbo features Alice in Wonderland, Peter Pan, and Lady and the Tramp was resumed. In addition, an ambitious new project, an adaptation of the Brothers Grimm fairy tale "Sleeping Beauty" set to Tchaikovsky's classic score, was begun but took much of the rest of the decade to complete.

Alice in Wonderland, released in 1951, met with a lukewarm response at the box office and was a sharp critical disappointment in its initial release. Peter Pan, released in 1953, on the other hand, was a commercial success and the fifth highest-grossing film of the year. In 1955, Lady and the Tramp was released to higher box-office success than any other Disney animated feature since Snow White and the Seven Dwarfs, earning an estimated $6.5 million in rentals at the North American box office in 1955. Lady and the Tramp is significant as Disney's first widescreen animated feature, produced in the CinemaScope process, and was the first Disney animated feature to be released by Disney's own distribution company, Buena Vista Distribution.

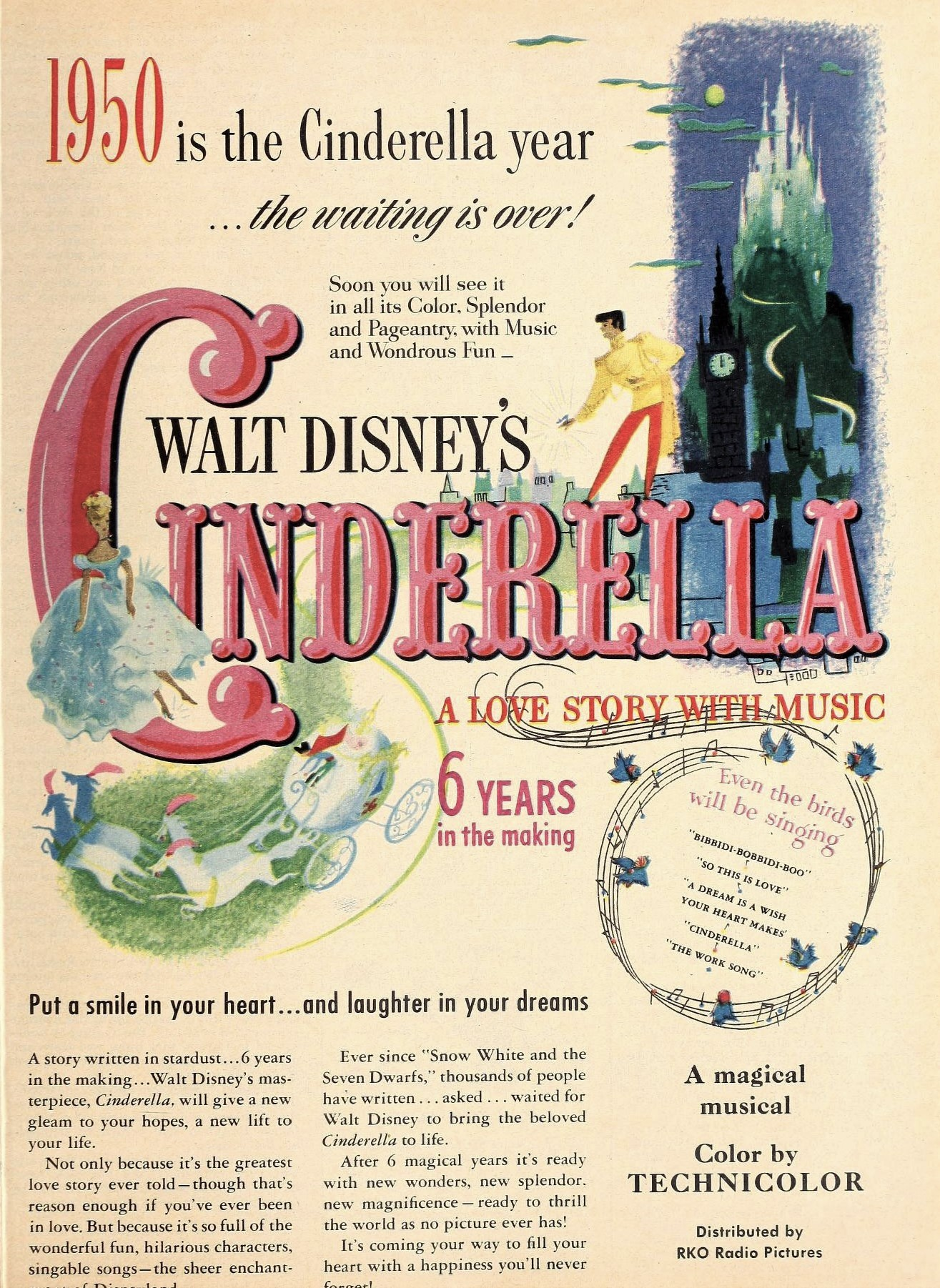
Cinderella's box office-success saved the studio from going out of business.

By the mid-1950s, with Walt Disney's attention primarily set on new endeavours such as live-action films, television and the Disneyland theme park, production of the animated films was left primarily in the hands of the "Nine Old Men" trust of head animators and directors. This led to several delays in approvals during the production of Sleeping Beauty, which was finally released in 1959. At $6 million, it was Disney's most expensive film to date, produced in a heavily stylised art style devised by artist Eyvind Earle and presented in large-format Super Technirama 70 with six-track stereophonic sound. However, despite being the studio's highest-grossing animated feature since Snow White and the Seven Dwarfs, the film's large production costs and the box-office underperformance of Disney's other 1959 output resulted in the studio posting its first annual loss in a decade for fiscal year 1960, leading to massive layoffs throughout the studio.

Susie the Little Blue Coupe (provided without audio) was released in 1952, shortly before Disney would begin slowly downscaling production of animated shorts.

By the end of the decade, the Disney short subjects were no longer being produced on a regular basis, with many of the shorts divisions' personnel either leaving the company or being reassigned to work on Disney television programs such as The Mickey Mouse Club and Disneyland. While the Silly Symphonies shorts had dominated the Academy Award for Best Short Subject (Cartoons) during the 1930s, the studio's reign over the most awards had been ended by Metro-Goldwyn-Mayer cartoon studio's Tom and Jerry cartoons, Warner Bros. Cartoons' Looney Tunes and Merrie Melodies, and the works of United Productions of America (UPA), whose flat art style and stylized animation techniques were lauded as more modern alternatives to the older Disney style. During the 1950s, only one Disney short, the stylized Toot, Whistle, Plunk and Boom, won the Best Short Subject (Cartoons) Oscar.

The Mickey Mouse, Pluto and Goofy shorts had all ceased regular production by 1953, with Donald Duck and Humphrey continuing and converting to widescreen CinemaScope before the shorts division was shut down in 1956. After that, all future shorts were produced by the feature films division until 1969. The last Disney short of the golden age of American animation was It's Tough to Be a Bird. Disney shorts would only be produced on a sporadic basis from this point on, with notable later shorts including Runaway Brain (1995, starring Mickey Mouse) and Paperman (2012).

Despite the 1959 layoffs and competition for Walt Disney's attention from the company's expanded live-action film, TV and theme park departments, production continued on feature animation productions at a reduced level.

In 1961, the studio released One Hundred and One Dalmatians, an animated feature that popularized the use of xerography during the process of inking and painting traditional animation cels. Using xerography, animation drawings could be photochemically transferred rather than traced from paper drawings to the clear acetate sheets ("cels") used in final animation production. The resulting art style – a scratchier line which revealed the construction lines in the animators' drawings – typified Disney films into the 1980s. The film was a success, being the tenth highest-grossing film of 1961 with rentals of $6.4 million.

The Disney animation training program started at the studio in 1932 before the development of Snow White eventually led to Walt Disney helping found the California Institute of the Arts (CalArts). This university formed via the merger of Chouinard Art Institute and the Los Angeles Conservatory of Music. It included a Disney-developed animation program of study among its degree offerings. CalArts became the alma mater of many of the animators who would work at Disney and other animation studios from the 1970s to the present.

The Sword in the Stone was released in 1963 and was the sixth highest-grossing film of the year in North America with estimated rentals of $4.75 million. A featurette adaptation of one of A. A. Milne's Winnie-the-Pooh stories, Winnie the Pooh and the Honey Tree, was released in 1966, to be followed by several other Pooh featurettes over the years and a full-length compilation feature, The Many Adventures of Winnie the Pooh, which was released in 1977.

Walt Disney died in December 1966, ten months before the studio's next film The Jungle Book, was completed and released. The film was a success, finishing 1967 as the fourth highest-grossing film of the year.

=== 1966–1984: Decline in popularity; Don Bluth's entrance and departure ===
Following Walt Disney's death, Wolfgang Reitherman continued as both producer and director of the studio's feature films. It was Reitherman who was responsible for a noticeable softening of the Disney villains. Over the next two decades, nearly all Disney villains were more comical or pitiful rather than scary. Reitherman's main priority was ensuring that the studio would continue to turn a profit and towards that end, he stressed the importance of making family-friendly films. According to Andreas Deja, Reitherman said that "if we lose the kids, we lose everything".

The studio began the 1970s with the release of The Aristocats, the last film project to be approved by Walt Disney. In 1971, Roy O. Disney, the studio co-founder, died and Walt Disney Productions was left in the hands of Donn Tatum and Card Walker, who alternated as chairman and CEO in overlapping terms until 1978. The next feature, Robin Hood (1973), was produced with a significantly reduced budget and animation repurposed from previous features. Both The Aristocats and Robin Hood were minor box office and critical successes.

The Rescuers, released in 1977, was a success exceeding the achievements of the previous two Disney features. Receiving positive reviews, high commercial returns, and an Academy Award nomination, it ended up being the third highest-grossing film of the year and the most successful and best reviewed Disney animated film since The Jungle Book. The film was reissued in 1983, accompanied by a new Disney featurette, Mickey's Christmas Carol.

The production of The Rescuers signaled the beginning of a changing of the guard process in the personnel at the Disney animation studio, as veterans such as Milt Kahl and Les Clark retired; they were gradually replaced by new talents such as Don Bluth, Ron Clements, John Musker and Glen Keane. The new animators, selected from the animation program at CalArts and trained by Eric Larson, Frank Thomas, Ollie Johnston and Woolie Reitherman, got their first chance to prove themselves as a group with the animated sequences in Disney's live-action/animated hybrid feature Pete's Dragon (1977), the animation for which was directed by Bluth. In September 1979, dissatisfied with what they felt was a stagnation in the development of the art of animation at Disney, Bluth and several of the other new guard animators quit to start their own studio, Don Bluth Productions, which became Disney's chief competitor in the animation field during the 1980s.

Delayed half a year by the defection of the Bluth group, The Fox and the Hound was released in 1981 after four years in production. The film was considered a financial success by the studio, and development continued on The Black Cauldron, a long-gestating adaptation of the Chronicles of Prydain series of novels by Lloyd Alexander produced in Super Technirama 70.

The Black Cauldron was intended to expand the appeal of Disney animated films to older audiences and to showcase the talents of the new generation of Disney animators from CalArts. Besides Keane, Musker and Clements, this new group of artists included other promising animators such as Andreas Deja, Mike Gabriel, John Lasseter, Brad Bird and Tim Burton. Lasseter was fired from Disney in 1983 for pushing the studio to explore computer animation production, but went on to become the creative head of Pixar, a pioneering computer animation studio that would begin a close association with Disney in the late 1980s. Similarly, Burton was fired in 1984 after producing a live-action short shelved by the studio, Frankenweenie, then went on to become a high-profile producer and director of live-action and stop-motion features for Disney and other studios. Some of Burton's high-profile projects for Disney would include the stop-motion The Nightmare Before Christmas (1993), a live-action adaptation of Alice in Wonderland (2010), and a stop-motion feature remake of Frankenweenie (2012). Bird was also fired after a few years working at the company for criticizing Disney's upper management as he felt that they were playing it safe and not taking risks on animation. He subsequently became an animation director at other studios, including Warner Bros. Animation and Pixar.

Ron Miller, Walt Disney's son-in-law, became president of Walt Disney Productions in 1980 and CEO in 1983. That year, he expanded the company's film and television production divisions, creating the Walt Disney Pictures banner under which future films from the feature animation department would be released.

=== 1984–1989: Restructuring and new projects for prominence ===
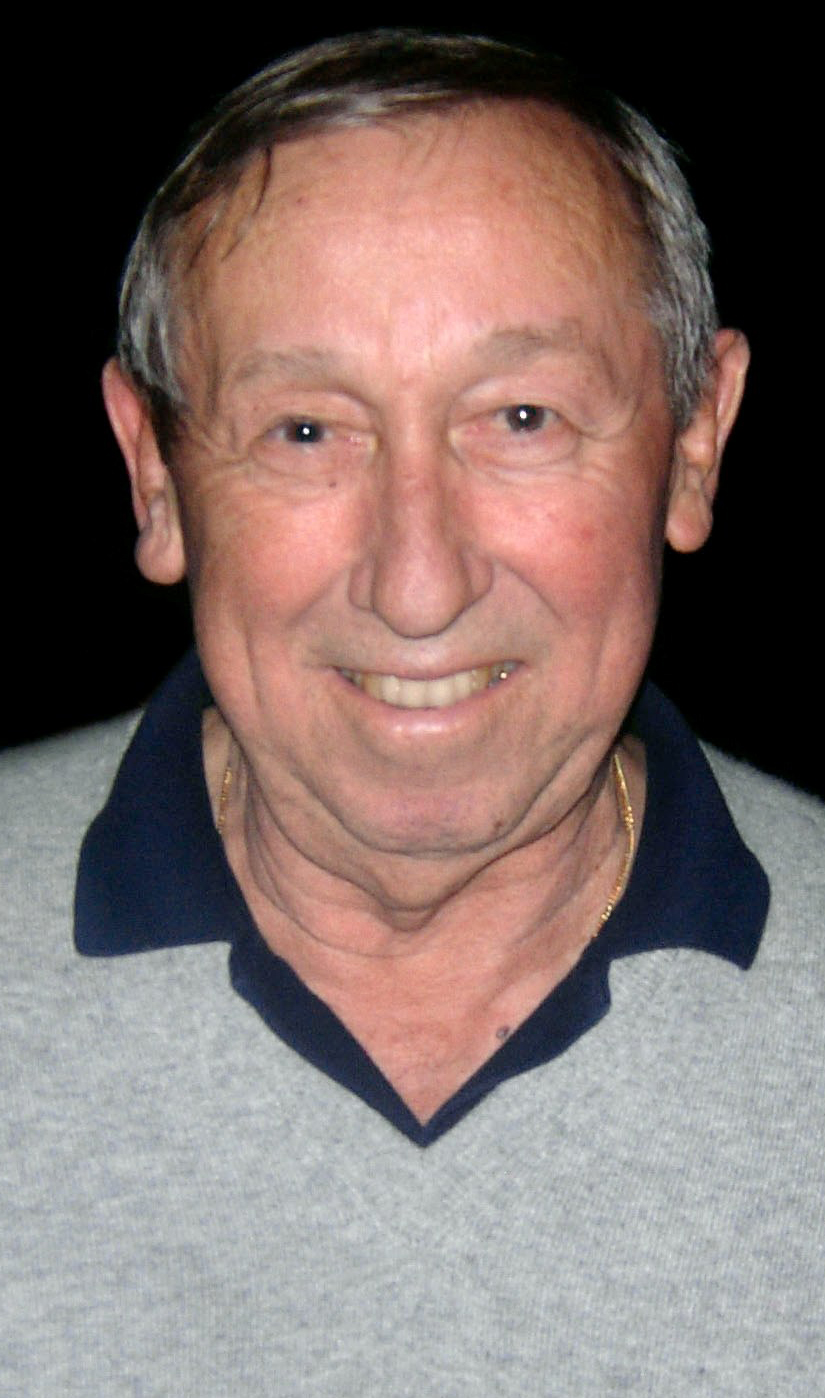
Roy E. Disney (chairman, 1985–2003), Roy O. Disney's son and nephew of Walt, was a key figure in restructuring the animation department following the reorganization of the Disney company in 1984.

After a series of corporate takeover attempts in 1984, Roy E. Disney, son of Roy O. and nephew of Walt, resigned from the company's board of directors and launched a campaign called "SaveDisney", successfully convincing the board to fire Miller. Roy E. Disney brought in Michael Eisner as Disney's new CEO and Frank Wells as president. Eisner in turn named Jeffrey Katzenberg chairman of the film division, The Walt Disney Studios. Near completion when the Eisner regime took over Disney, The Black Cauldron (1985) came to represent what would later be referred to as the "rock bottom" point for Disney animation. The studio's most expensive feature to that point at $44 million, The Black Cauldron was a critical and commercial failure. The film's $21 million box office gross led to a loss for the studio, putting the future of the animation department in jeopardy.

Between the 1950s and 1980s, the significance of animation to Disney's bottom line was significantly reduced as the company expanded into further live-action production, television and theme parks. As new CEO, Michael Eisner strongly considered shuttering the feature animation studio and outsourcing future animation. Roy E. Disney intervened, offering to head the feature animation division and turn its fortunes around, while Eisner established the Walt Disney Pictures Television Animation Group to produce lower-cost animation for television. Named Chairman of feature animation by Eisner, Roy E. Disney appointed Peter Schneider president of animation to run the day-to-day operations in 1985.

On February 1, 1985, Disney executives began to move the animation department from the Disney studio lot in Burbank to a variety of warehouses, hangars and trailers located about 2 mi (3.2 km) east at 1420 Flower Street in nearby Glendale, California. About a year later, the growing computer graphics (CG) group would move there too.

The animation department's first feature animation at its new location was The Great Mouse Detective (1986), begun by John Musker and Ron Clements as Basil of Baker Street after both left production of The Black Cauldron. The film was enough of a critical and commercial success to instill executive confidence in the animation studio. Later the same year, however, Universal Pictures and Steven Spielberg's Amblin Entertainment released Don Bluth's An American Tail, which outgrossed The Great Mouse Detective at the box office and became the highest-grossing first-issue animated film to that point.

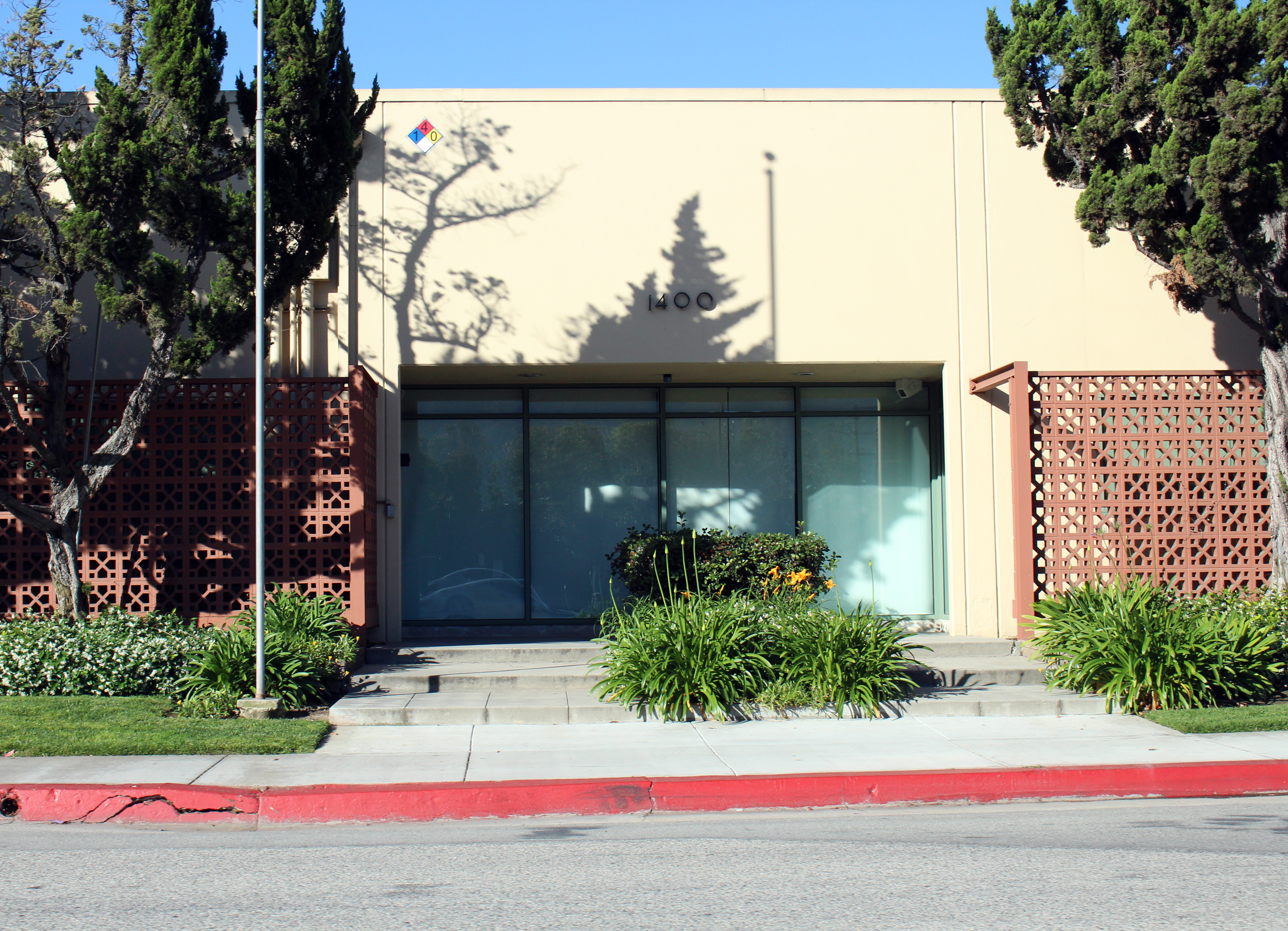
1400 Flower Street in Glendale, California, one of several buildings used by Walt Disney Feature Animation between 1985 and 1995.

Katzenberg, Schneider, and Roy Disney set about changing the culture of the studio, increasing staffing and production so that a new animated feature would be released every year instead of every two to four. The first of the releases on the accelerated production schedule was Oliver & Company (1988), which featured an all-star cast including Billy Joel and Bette Midler and an emphasis on a modern pop soundtrack. Oliver & Company opened in the theaters on the same day as another Bluth/Amblin/Universal animated film, The Land Before Time. Oliver & Company outgrossed The Land Before Time in the U.S. and went on to become the most successful animated feature in the U.S. to that date, though the latter's worldwide box office gross was higher than the former.

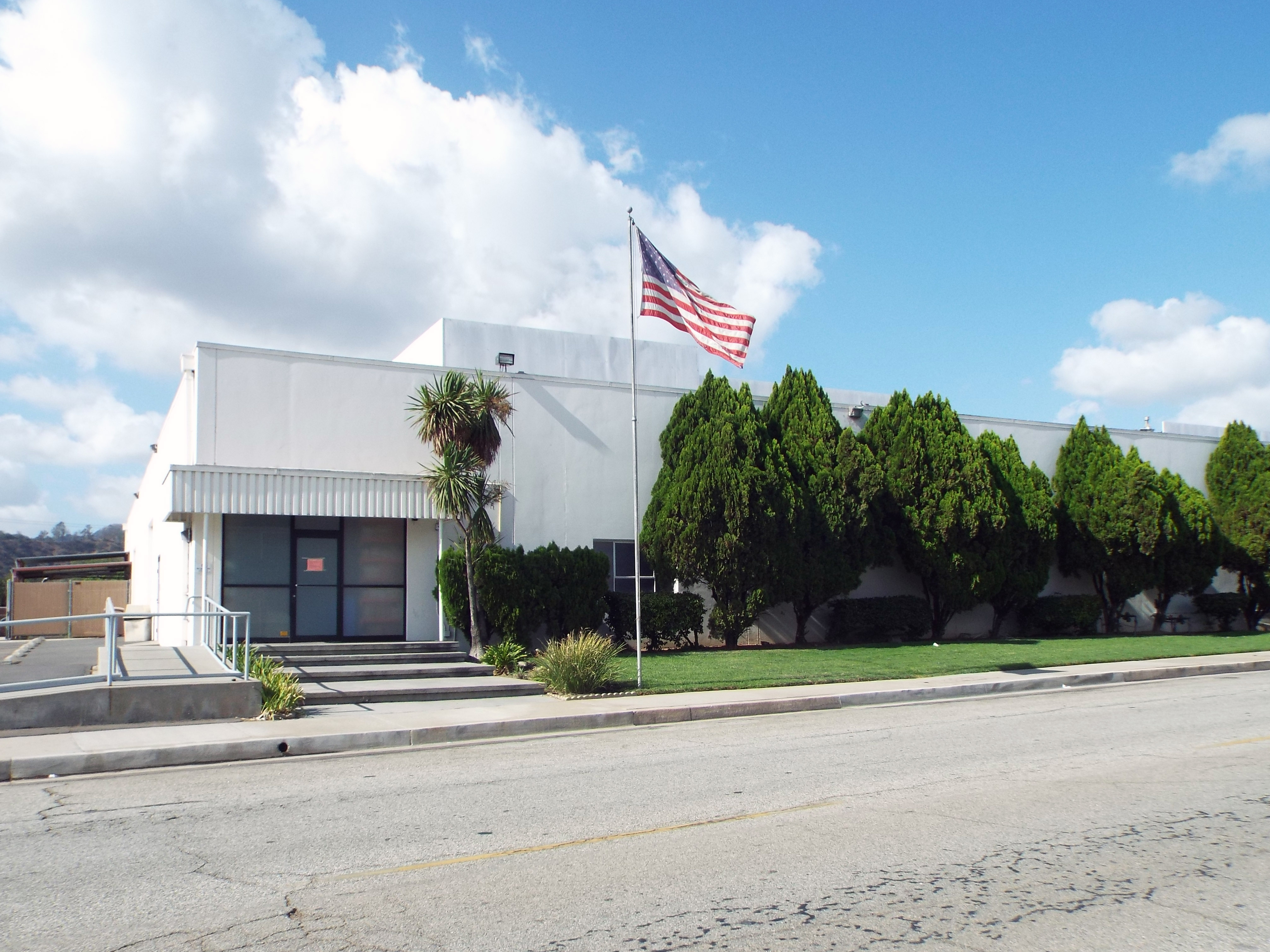
1400 Air Way, another Glendale building used by Walt Disney Feature Animation between 1985 and 1995.

At the same time in 1988, Disney started entering into Australia's long-standing animation industry by purchasing Hanna-Barbera's Australian studio to start Disney Animation Australia.

While Oliver & Company and the next feature The Little Mermaid were in production, Disney collaborated with Steven Spielberg's Amblin Entertainment and master animator Richard Williams to produce Who Framed Roger Rabbit, a groundbreaking live-action/animation hybrid directed by Robert Zemeckis, which featured licensed animated characters from other studios (such as Warner Bros., MGM, and Universal). Disney set up a new animation studio under Williams' supervision in London to create the cartoon characters for Roger Rabbit, with many of the artists from the California studio traveling to England to work on the film. A significant critical and commercial success, Roger Rabbit won three Academy Awards for technical achievements. and was key in renewing mainstream interest in American animation. Other than the film itself, the studio also produced three Roger Rabbit shorts during the late 1980s and early 1990s.

=== 1989–1994: Beginning of the Disney Renaissance, success & impact ===
A second satellite studio, Walt Disney Feature Animation Florida, opened in 1989 with 40 employees. Its offices were located within the Disney-MGM Studios Theme Park theme park at Walt Disney World in Bay Lake, Florida, and visitors were allowed to tour the studio and observe animators at work. That same year, the studio released The Little Mermaid, which became a keystone achievement in Disney's history as its largest critical and commercial success in decades. Directed by John Musker and Ron Clements, who had been co-directors on The Great Mouse Detective, The Little Mermaid earned $84 million at the North American box office, a record for the studio. The film was built around a score from Broadway songwriters Alan Menken and Howard Ashman, who was also a co-producer and story consultant on the film. The Little Mermaid won two Academy Awards, for Best Original Song and Best Original Score.

The Little Mermaid vigorously relaunched a profound new interest in the animation and musical film genres. The film was also the first to feature the use of Disney's Computer Animation Production System (CAPS). Developed for Disney by Pixar, which had grown into a commercial computer animation and technology development company, CAPS/ink-and-paint would become significant in allowing future Disney films to more seamlessly integrate computer-generated imagery and achieve higher production values with digital ink and paint and compositing techniques. The Little Mermaid was the first of a series of blockbusters that would be released over the next decade by Walt Disney Feature Animation, a period later designated by the term Disney Renaissance. The Renaissance era also saw the studio return to making films with darker themes and scarier villains, similar to the films it had made when Walt Disney was alive.

Accompanied in theaters by the Mickey Mouse featurette The Prince and the Pauper, The Rescuers Down Under (1990) was Disney's first animated feature sequel and the studio's first film to be fully colored and composited via computer using the CAPS/ink-and-paint system. However, the film did not duplicate the success of The Little Mermaid. The next Disney animated feature, Beauty and the Beast, had begun production in London but was moved back to Burbank after Disney decided to shutter the London satellite office and retool the film into a musical-comedy format similar to The Little Mermaid. Alan Menken and Howard Ashman were retained to write the songs and score, though Ashman died before production was completed.

Debuting first in a work-in-progress version at the 1991 New York Film Festival before its November 1991 wide release, Beauty and the Beast, directed by Kirk Wise and Gary Trousdale, was an unprecedented critical and commercial success and would later be regarded as one of the studio's best films. The film earned six Academy Award nominations, including one for Best Picture, a first for an animated work, winning for Best Song and Best Original Score. Its $145 million box office gross set new records, and merchandising for the film, including toys, cross-promotions, and soundtrack sales, was also lucrative.

The successes of The Little Mermaid and Beauty and the Beast established the template for future Disney releases during the 1990s: a musical-comedy format with Broadway-styled songs and tentpole action sequences, buoyed by cross-promotional marketing and merchandising, all designed to bring audiences of all ages and types into theaters. In addition to John Musker, Ron Clements, Kirk Wise and Gary Trousdale, the new guard of Disney artists creating these films included story artists/directors Roger Allers, Rob Minkoff, Chris Sanders and Brenda Chapman, and lead animators Glen Keane, Andreas Deja, Eric Goldberg, Nik Ranieri, Will Finn and many others.

Aladdin, released in November 1992, continued the upward trend in Disney's animation success, earning $504 million worldwide at the box office, and two more Oscars for Best Song and Best Score. Featuring songs by Menken, Ashman and Tim Rice (who replaced Ashman after his death) and starring the voice of Robin Williams, Aladdin also established the trend of hiring celebrity actors and actresses to provide the voices of Disney characters, which had been explored to some degree with The Jungle Book and Oliver & Company, but now became standard practice.

In June 1994, Disney released The Lion King, directed by Roger Allers and Rob Minkoff. An all-animal story set in Africa, The Lion King featured an all-star voice cast which included James Earl Jones, Matthew Broderick, Jeremy Irons, Nathan Lane, Rowan Atkinson and Whoopi Goldberg, with songs written by Tim Rice and pop star Elton John. The Lion King earned $768 million at the worldwide box office, to this date a record for a traditionally-animated film, earning millions more in merchandising, promotions and record sales for its soundtrack.

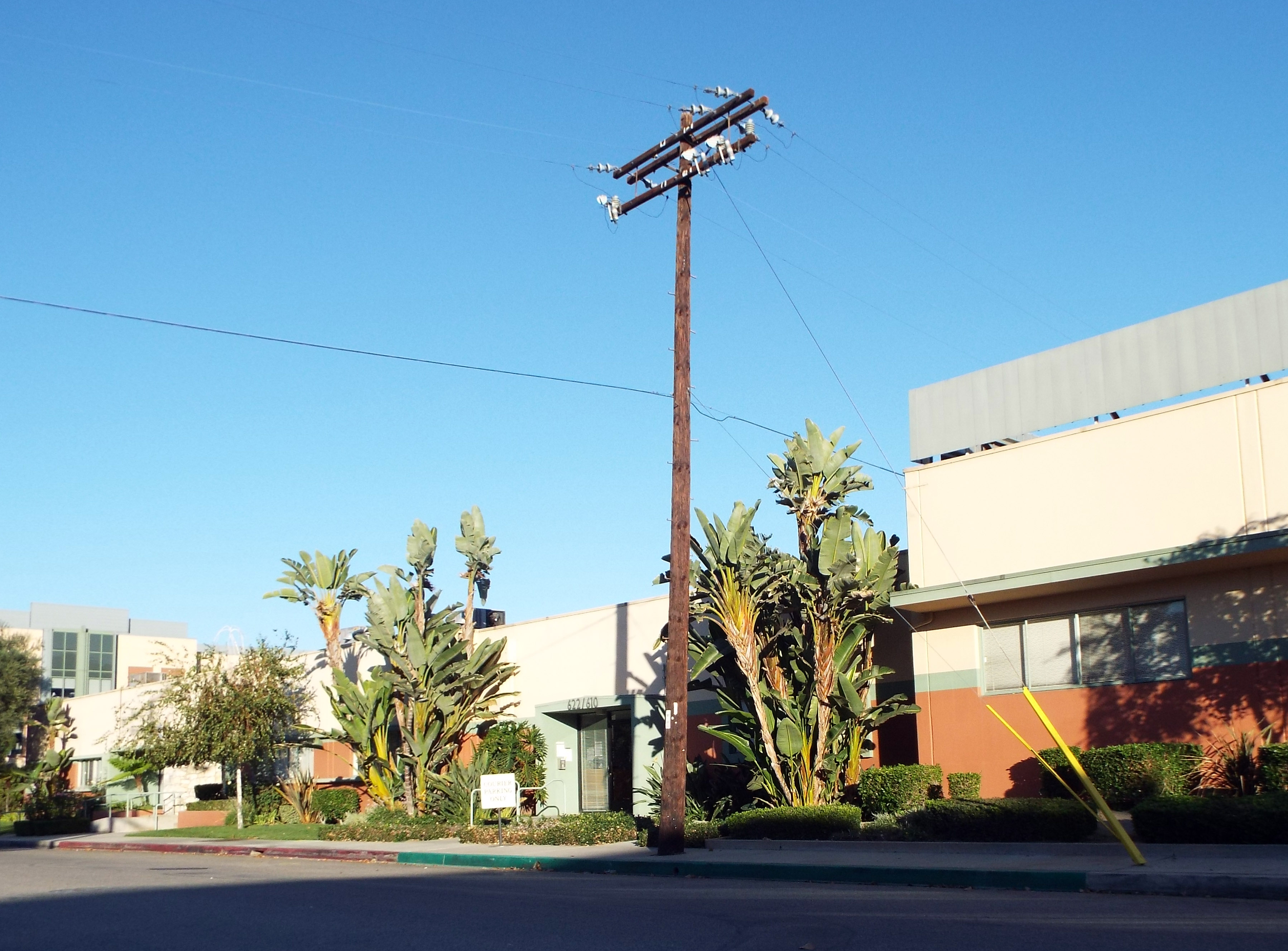
622/610 Circle 7 Drive (the Hart-Dannon Building), another Glendale building used by Walt Disney Feature Animation during the early 1990s.

Aladdin and The Lion King had been the highest-grossing films worldwide in each of their respective release years. Between these in-house productions, Disney diversified in animation methods and produced The Nightmare Before Christmas with former Disney animator Tim Burton; Walt Disney Feature Animation contributed by providing the film's second-layering traditional animation. With animation becoming again an increasingly important and lucrative part of Disney's business, the company began to expand its operations. The flagship California studio was split into two units and expanded, and ground was broken on a new Disney Feature Animation building adjacent to the main Disney lot in Burbank, which was dedicated in 1995. also one of Disney's television animation studios in the Paris, France suburb of Montreuil – the former Brizzi Brothers studio – became Walt Disney Feature Animation Paris, where A Goofy Movie (1995) and significant parts of later Disney films were produced. Disney also began producing lower cost direct-to-video sequels and prequels for its successful animated films using the services of its television animation studios under the name Disney MovieToons. The Return of Jafar (1994), a sequel to Aladdin and a pilot for the Aladdin television show spin-off, was the first of these productions. Walt Disney Feature Animation was also heavily involved in the adaptations of both Beauty and the Beast in 1994 and The Lion King in 1997 into Broadway musicals.

Jeffrey Katzenberg and the Disney story team were heavily involved in the development and production of Toy Story, the first fully computer-animated feature ever produced. Toy Story was produced for Disney by Pixar and directed by former Disney animator John Lasseter, whom Peter Schneider had unsuccessfully tried to hire back after his success with Pixar shorts such as Tin Toy (1988). Released in 1995, Toy Story opened to critical acclaim and commercial success, leading to Pixar signing a five-film deal with Disney, which bore critically and financially successful computer animated films such as A Bug's Life (1998), Toy Story 2 (1999), Monsters, Inc. (2001), Finding Nemo (2003), and The Incredibles (2004).

In addition, the successes of Aladdin and The Lion King spurred a significant increase in the number of American-produced animated features throughout the rest of the decade, with the major film studios establishing new animation divisions such as Fox Animation Studios, Sullivan Bluth Studios (both founded by Don Bluth), Amblimation, Rich Animation Studios, Turner Feature Animation, and Warner Bros. Feature Animation being formed to produce films in a Disney-esque musical-comedy format such as We're Back! A Dinosaur's Story (1993), Thumbelina (1994), The Swan Princess (1994), A Troll in Central Park (1994), The Pebble and the Penguin (1995), Cats Don't Dance (1997), Anastasia (1997), Quest for Camelot (1998), and The King and I (1999). Out of these non-Disney animated features, only Anastasia was a box-office success, and it later ended up being acquired by Disney through the company's acquisition of 21st Century Fox in 2019.

=== 1994–1999: Late Disney Renaissance and declining returns ===
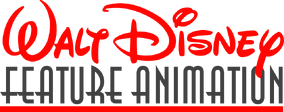
Walt Disney Feature Animation logo, used from 1994 to 1997

Walt Disney Feature Animation logo, used from 1997 to 2007

Concerns arose internally at the Disney studio, particularly from Roy E. Disney, about studio chief Jeffrey Katzenberg taking too much credit for the success of Disney's early 1990s releases. Disney Company president Frank Wells was killed in a helicopter accident in 1994, and Katzenberg lobbied CEO Michael Eisner for the vacant president position. Instead, tensions between Katzenberg, Eisner and Disney resulted in Katzenberg being forced to resign from the company on August 24 of that year, with Joe Roth taking his place. On October 12, 1994, Katzenberg went on to become one of the founders of DreamWorks SKG, whose animation division became Disney's key rival in feature animation, with both computer animated films such as Antz (1998) and traditionally-animated films such as The Prince of Egypt (1998). In December 1994, the Animation Building in Burbank was completed for the animation division.

In contrast to the early 1990s productions, not all the films in the second half of the renaissance were successful. Pocahontas, released in the summer of 1995, was the first film of the renaissance to receive mixed reviews from critics. It was still popular with audiences and commercially successful, earning $346 million worldwide. The film won two Academy Awards for its music by Alan Menken and Stephen Schwartz.

The next film, The Hunchback of Notre Dame (1996) was partially produced at the Paris studio. Although it is considered Disney's darkest film, The Hunchback of Notre Dame performed better critically than Pocahontas and grossed $325 million worldwide.

The following summer, Hercules (1997) did well at the box office, grossing $252 million worldwide, but underperformed in comparison to Disney's previous films. It received positive reviews for its acting but the animation and music were mixed. Hercules was responsible for beginning the decline of traditionally-animated films. The declining box-office success became doubly concerning inside the studio as wage competition from DreamWorks had significantly increased the studio's overhead, with production costs increasing from $79 million in total costs (production, marketing, and overhead) for The Lion King in 1994 to $179 million for Hercules three years later. Moreover, Disney depended upon the popularity of its new features in order to develop merchandising, theme park attractions, direct-to-video sequels and television programming in its other divisions. The production schedule was scaled back and a larger number of creative executives were hired to more closely supervise production, a move that was not popular among the animation staff.

Mulan (1998), the first film produced primarily at the Florida studio, opened to positive reviews from audiences and critics and earned a successful $305 million at the worldwide box office, restoring both the critical and commercial success of the studio. The next film, Tarzan (1999), directed by Kevin Lima and Chris Buck, had a high production cost of $130 million, again received positive reviews and earned $448 million at the box office. The Tarzan soundtrack by pop star Phil Collins resulted in significant record sales and an Academy Award for Best Song.

=== 1999–2005: Experimentation & corporate disorder ===
Fantasia 2000, a sequel to the 1940 film that had been a pet project of Roy E. Disney's since 1990, premiered on December 17, 1999, at Carnegie Hall in New York City as part of a concert tour that also visited London, Paris, Tokyo and Pasadena, California. The film was then released in 75 IMAX theaters worldwide from January 1 to April 30, 2000, making it the first animated feature-length film to be released in the format; a standard theatrical release followed on June 16, 2000. Produced in pieces when artists were available between productions, Fantasia 2000 was the first animated feature produced for and released in IMAX format. The film's $90 million worldwide box office total against its $90 million production cost resulted in it losing $100 million for the studio.

Peter Schneider left his post as president of Walt Disney Feature Animation in 1999 to become president of The Walt Disney Studios under Joe Roth. Thomas Schumacher, who had been Schneider's vice president of animation for several years, became the new president of Walt Disney Feature Animation. By this time, competition from other studios had driven animators' incomes to all-time highs, making traditionally-animated features even more costly to produce. Schumacher was tasked with cutting costs, and massive layoffs began to cut salaries and bring the studio's staff – which peaked at 2,200 people in 1999 – down to approximately 1,200 employees.

In October 1999, Dream Quest Images, a special effects studio previously purchased by the Walt Disney Company in April 1996 to replace Buena Vista Visual Effects, was merged with the computer-graphics operation of Walt Disney Feature Animation to form a division called The Secret Lab. The Secret Lab produced one feature film, Dinosaur, which was released in May 2000 and featured CGI prehistoric creatures against filmed live-action backgrounds. The $128 million production earned $349 million worldwide, below studio expectations, and The Secret Lab was closed in 2001.

In December 2000, The Emperor's New Groove was released. It had been a musical epic called Kingdom of the Sun before being revised mid-production into a smaller comedy. The film earned $169 million worldwide on release, though it was well-reviewed and performed better on video; That same year, Atlantis: The Lost Empire, an attempt to break the Disney formula by moving into action-adventure, received mixed reviews and earned $186 million worldwide against production costs of $120 million.

By 2001 and early 2002, the notable successes of Pixar's computer-animated films Disney had been distributing, along with DreamWorks' Shrek and Blue Sky Studios' Ice Age, respectively, against Disney's lesser returns for The Emperor's New Groove and Atlantis: The Lost Empire led to the speculation that hand-drawn animation was becoming obsolete. Disney laid off most of the employees at the Feature Animation studio in Burbank, downsizing it to one unit and beginning plans to move into fully computer-animated films. A handful of employees were offered positions doing computer animation. Morale plunged to a low not seen since the start of the studio's ten-year exile to Glendale in 1985. The Paris studio was also closed in 2003. The layoffs had reduced the Burbank studio's headcount from about 1,300 employees down to approximately 1,000 by mid-2003.

The Burbank studio's remaining hand-drawn productions, Treasure Planet and Home on the Range, continued production. Treasure Planet, a futuristic outer space retelling of Robert Louis Stevenson's Treasure Island, was a pet project of writer-directors Ron Clements and John Musker. It received a simultaneous IMAX release and generally positive reviews but was financially unsuccessful upon its November 2002 release, resulting in a $74 million write-down for the Walt Disney Company in fiscal year 2003.

The Burbank studio's 2D departments closed at the end of 2002, following the completion of Home on the Range, a long-in-production feature that had previously been known as Sweating Bullets. Meanwhile, hand-drawn feature animation production continued at the Feature Animation Florida studio, where the films could be produced at lower costs. Lilo & Stitch, an offbeat comedy-drama written and directed by Chris Sanders and Dean DeBlois, became the studio's first bonafide hit since Tarzan upon its summer 2002 release, earning $273 million worldwide against an $80 million production budget.

By this time, most of the Disney features from the 1990s had been spun off into direct-to-video sequels, television series, or both, produced by the Disney Television Animation unit. Beginning with the February 2002 release of Return to Never Land, a sequel to Peter Pan (1953), Disney began releasing lower-budgeted sequels to earlier films. These films had been intended for video premieres, but they were released in theaters. The process was derided by some of the Disney animation staff and the fans of the Disney films.

In 2003, Tom Schumacher was appointed president of Buena Vista Theatrical Group, Disney's stageplay and musical theater arm, and David Stainton, then president of Walt Disney Television Animation, was appointed as his replacement. Stainton continued to oversee Disney's direct-to-video division, Disneytoon Studios, which had been part of the television animation department, though transferred at this time to Walt Disney Feature Animation management.

Under Stainton, the Florida studio completed Brother Bear, which received a weaker response from critics than Lilo & Stitch but still recouped its low budget in theatres. Disney closed the Florida studio on January 12, 2004, with the then in-progress feature My Peoples left unfinished when the studio closed two months later. Home on the Range, released in April 2004, was also not as critically or commercially successful as Lilo & Stitch. Disney officially announced its conversion of Walt Disney Feature Animation into a fully CGI studio – a process begun two years prior – now with a staff of 600 people. Disney also began selling off all of its traditional animation equipment.

Just after Brother Bear's November 2003 release, Feature Animation chairman Roy E. Disney had resigned from the Walt Disney Company. Roy Disney and his business partner Stanley Gold launched a second external "SaveDisney" campaign, similar to the one that had forced Ron Miller out in 1984. This time they were attempting to force out Michael Eisner. Two of their arguing points against Eisner included his handling of Feature Animation and the souring of the studio's relationship with Pixar. The same year, the studio collaborated with Walt Disney Imagineering on the 4D Disney Parks film Mickey's PhilharMagic. One of the studio's first attempts at CG animation, several animators returned to work on the film; such as Glen Keane animating Ariel and Nik Ranieri animating Lumière.

Talks between Eisner and Pixar CEO Steve Jobs over renewal terms for the highly lucrative Pixar-Disney distribution deal broke down in January 2004. Jobs, in particular, disagreed with Eisner's insistence that sequels such as the then in-development Toy Story 3 (2010) would not count against the number of films required in the studio's new deal. To that end, Disney announced the launching of Circle 7 Animation, a division of Feature Animation which would have produced sequels to the Pixar films, while Pixar began shopping for a new distribution deal.

In 2005, Disney released its first fully computer-animated feature, Chicken Little. The film was a success at the box office, earning $315 million worldwide, but was met with critically negative reviews. Earlier that year, after two years of Roy E. Disney's "SaveDisney" campaign, Eisner announced that he would resign and named Bob Iger, then president of the Walt Disney Company, his successor as chairman and CEO.

=== 2006–2009: Reorganization ===
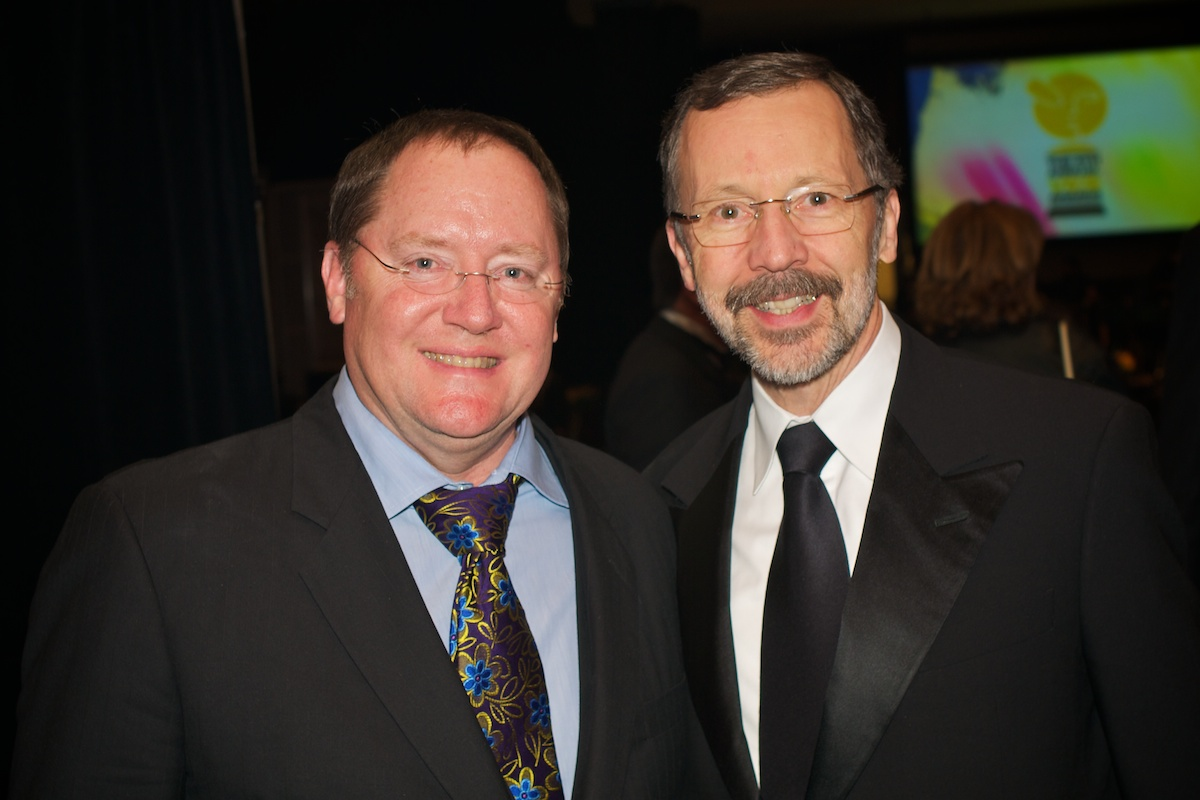
John Lasseter (Chief Creative Officer, 2006–18, left) and Edwin Catmull (President, 2006–18, right) came to Disney following its acquisition of Pixar and dedicated themselves to revitalizing Walt Disney Animation Studios after the studio's unsuccessful early 2000s period.

Iger later said, "I didn't yet have a complete sense of just how broken Disney Animation was." He described its history since the early 1990s as "dotted by a slew of expensive failures" like Hercules and Chicken Little; the "modest successes" like Mulan and Lilo & Stitch were still critically and commercially unsuccessful compared to the earlier films of the Disney Renaissance.

After Iger became CEO, Jobs resumed negotiations for Pixar with Disney. On January 24, 2006, Disney announced that it would acquire Pixar for $7.4 billion in an all-stock deal, with the deal closing that May. Consequently, the Circle 7 studio launched to produce Toy Story 3 was shut down. Most of that studio's employees returned to Feature Animation and Toy Story 3 returned to Pixar's control. Iger later said that it was "a deal I wanted badly, and [Disney] needed badly." He believed that Disney Animation needed new leadership and, as part of the acquisition, Edwin Catmull and John Lasseter were named president and Chief Creative Officer, respectively, of Feature Animation as well as Pixar.

While Disney executives had discussed closing Feature Animation as redundant, Catmull and Lasseter refused and instead resolved to try to turn things around at the studio. Lasseter said, "We weren't going to let that [closure] happen on our watch. We were determined to save the legacy of Walt Disney's amazing studio and bring it back up to the creative level it had to be. Saving this heritage was squarely on our shoulders." Lasseter and Catmull set about rebuilding the morale of the Feature Animation staff, and rehired a number of its 1980s "new guard" generation of star animators who had left the studio, including Ron Clements, John Musker, Eric Goldberg, Mark Henn, Andreas Deja, Bruce W. Smith and Chris Buck.

To maintain the separation of Walt Disney Feature Animation and Pixar despite their now common ownership and management, Catmull and Lasseter "drew a hard line" that each studio was solely responsible for its own projects and would not be allowed to borrow personnel from or lend tasks out to the other. Catmull said that he and Lasseter would "make sure the studios are quite distinct from each other. We don't want them to merge; that would definitely be the wrong approach. Each should have its own personality."

Catmull and Lasseter also brought to Disney Feature Animation the Pixar model of a "filmmaker-driven studio" as opposed to an "executive-driven studio"; they abolished Disney's prior system of requiring directors to respond to "mandatory" notes from development executives ranking above the producers in favor of a system roughly analogous to peer review, in which non-mandatory notes come primarily from fellow producers, directors and writers. Most of the layers of "gatekeepers" (midlevel executives) were stripped away, and Lasseter established a routine of personally meeting weekly with filmmakers on all projects in the last year of production and delivering feedback on the spot.

The studio's then-current team of top creatives who worked together closely on the development of its films became known as the Disney Story Trust. It was somewhat similar to the Pixar Braintrust, but its meetings were reportedly "more polite" than those of its Pixar counterpart.

In 2007, Lasseter changed the name of Walt Disney Feature Animation to Walt Disney Animation Studios, and re-positioned the studio as an animation house that produced both traditional and computer-animated projects. In order to keep costs down on hand-drawn productions, animation, design and layout were done in-house at Disney while clean-up animation and digital ink-and-paint were farmed out to vendors and freelancers.

The studio released Meet the Robinsons in 2007, its second all-CGI film, earning $169.3 million worldwide. That same year, Disneytoon Studios was also restructured and began to operate as a separate unit under Lasseter and Catmull's control. Lasseter's direct intervention with the studio's next film, American Dog, resulted in the departure of director Chris Sanders, who went on to become a director at DreamWorks Animation. The film was retooled by new directors Byron Howard and Chris Williams as Bolt. It was released in 2008 and had the best critical reception of any Disney animated feature since Lilo & Stitch. The film also became a moderate financial success, receiving an Academy Award nomination for Best Animated Film.

The Princess and the Frog was the studio's first hand-drawn animated film in five years. It was loosely based on the fairy tale The Frog Prince and the 2002 novel The Frog Princess. The film was directed by Ron Clements and John Musker. A return to the musical-comedy format of the 1990s with songs by Randy Newman, the film was released in 2009 to a positive critical reception. It was also nominated for three Academy Awards, including two for Best Song.

The box-office performance of The Princess and the Frog – a total of $267 million earned worldwide against a $105 million production budget – was seen as an underperformance due to competition with Avatar. The film's underperformance was also attributed to the word "Princess" in the title. The future Disney films then in production which were about princesses were given gender-neutral, symbolic titles: Rapunzel became Tangled and The Snow Queen became Frozen. In 2014, former Disney animator Tom Sito compared the box-office performance of The Princess and the Frog to that of The Great Mouse Detective (1986), which was a step-up from the theatrical run of the 1985 film The Black Cauldron.

In 2009, the studio also produced the computer-animated Prep & Landing holiday special for the ABC television network.

=== 2010–2019: New leadership and return to success ===
After The Princess and the Frog, the studio released Tangled in 2010, a CGI adaptation of the Brothers Grimm fairy tale "Rapunzel" with a score by Alan Menken and songs by Glenn Slater. In development since 2002 under Glen Keane, Tangled, directed by Byron Howard and Nathan Greno, became a significant critical and commercial success nominated for several accolades. The film earned $592 million in worldwide box office revenue, becoming the studio's third most successful release to date. The hand-drawn feature Winnie the Pooh, a new feature film based on the eponymous stories by A. A. Milne, followed in 2011 to positive reviews; it remains the studio's most recent hand-drawn feature. The film was released in theaters alongside the hand-drawn short The Ballad of Nessie.

Wreck-It Ralph, directed by Rich Moore, was released in 2012 to critical acclaim and commercial success. The film follows a video-game villain who redeems himself as a hero. It won numerous awards, including the Annie, Critics' Choice and Kids' Choice Awards for Best Animated Feature Film, and received Golden Globe and Academy Award nominations. The film earned $471 million in worldwide box office revenue.

In addition, the studio won its first Academy Award for a short film in forty-four years with Paperman, which was released in theaters with Wreck-It Ralph. Directed by John Kahrs, Paperman utilized new software developed in-house at the studio called Meander, which merges hand-drawn and computer animation techniques within the same character to create a unique "hybrid". According to Producer Kristina Reed, the studio was at the time continuing to develop the technique for future projects, including an animated feature.

In 2013, the studio laid off nine of its hand-drawn animators, including Nik Ranieri and Ruben A. Aquino, leading to speculation on animation blogs that the studio was abandoning traditional animation, an idea that the studio dismissed. Later that same year, in November, Frozen, a CGI musical film inspired by Hans Christian Andersen's fairy tale "The Snow Queen", was released to widespread acclaim and became a blockbuster hit. Directed by Chris Buck and Jennifer Lee with songs by the Broadway team of Robert Lopez and Kristen Anderson-Lopez, it was the first Disney animated film to earn over $1 billion in worldwide box office revenue. Frozen also became the first film from Walt Disney Animation Studios to win the Academy Award for Best Animated Feature (a category started in 2001), as well as the first feature-length motion picture from the studio to win an Academy Award since Tarzan and the first to win multiple Academy Awards since Pocahontas. It was released in theaters with Get a Horse!, a new Mickey Mouse cartoon combining black-and-white hand-drawn animation and full-color CGI animation.

The studio's next feature, Big Hero 6, a comedy-adventure film inspired by the Marvel Comics series of the same name, was released in November 2014. For the film, the studio developed new light rendering software called Hyperion, which the studio continued to use on all subsequent films. Big Hero 6 received critical acclaim and was the highest-grossing animated film of 2014, also winning the Academy Award for Best Animated Feature. The film was accompanied in theaters by the animated short Feast, which won the Academy Award for Best Animated Short Film. In the same month that Big Hero 6 was released, it was announced that General Manager, Andrew Millstein had been promoted as President of Walt Disney Animation Studios.

In March 2016, the studio released Zootopia, a buddy-comedy film set in a modern world inhabited by anthropomorphic animals. The film was a critical and commercial success, grossing over $1 billion worldwide, and won the Academy Award for Best Animated Feature.

Moana, a fantasy-adventure musical film, was released in November 2016. The film was shown in theaters with the animated short, Inner Workings. Moana was another commercial and critical success for the studio, grossing over $600 million worldwide and receiving two Academy Award nominations.

In November 2017, John Lasseter announced that he was taking a six-month leave of absence after acknowledging what he called "missteps" in his behavior with employees in a memo to staff. According to various news outlets, Lasseter had a history of alleged sexual misconduct towards employees. On June 8, 2018, it was announced that Lasseter would leave Disney and Pixar at the end of the year after the company decided not to renew his contract. He would instead take on a consulting role until the expiration of the contract. Jennifer Lee was announced as Lasseter's replacement as chief creative officer of Disney Animation on June 19, 2018.

On June 28, 2018, the studio's division Disneytoon Studios was shut down, resulting in the layoffs of 75 animators and staff. On October 23, 2018, it was announced that Ed Catmull would be retiring at the end of the year, and would stay in an adviser role until July 2019.

In November 2018, the studio released a sequel to Wreck-It Ralph, titled Ralph Breaks the Internet. The film grossed over $529 million worldwide and received nominations for a Golden Globe and an Academy Award, both for Best Animated Feature.

=== 2019–present: Ongoing changes and struggles ===
In August 2019, it was announced that Andrew Millstein would be stepping down from his role as president, before moving on to become co-president of Blue Sky Studios alongside Robert Baird, while Clark Spencer was named president of Disney Animation, reporting to Walt Disney Studios chairman Alan Bergman and working alongside chief creative officer Jennifer Lee.

The sequel Frozen 2 was released in November 2019. The film grossed over $1 billion worldwide and received an Academy Award nomination for Best Original Song.

From 2020 to 2022, Disney Animation produced a series of experimental shorts called Short Circuit for the Disney+ streaming service. The first pack of shorts was released in January 2020, and a second pack was released in August 2021. During that period, Disney Animation returned to work on hand-drawn animation once again, having released the hand-drawn "At Home with Olaf" web short "Ice," as well as three hand-drawn animated Goofy shorts for Disney+, and a hand-drawn animated "Short Circuit" titled "Dinosaur Barbarian". In April 2022, Eric Goldberg confirmed plans within the studio to develop hand-drawn animated films and series. That year saw the release of the hand-drawn shorts Mickey in a Minute, released as part of the Disney+ documentary Mickey: The Story of a Mouse, and Oswald the Lucky Rabbit, which marked the title character's first animated short produced by Disney Animation since Disney acquired the rights for the character in 2006.

In December 2020, the studio announced that it was expanding into producing television series – a business usually handled by the Disney Television Animation division. Most of the projects in development were for Disney+. The CG series produced included Baymax! (a spin-off of Big Hero 6), Zootopia+ (an anthology series set in the Zootopia universe), and Iwájú (an original long-form science fiction anthology series co-produced with British-based Pan-African entertainment company Kugali Media). In addition, employees from Disney Animation were involved on the Disney Television Animation series Monsters at Work, based on Pixar's Monsters, Inc. franchise.

Raya and the Last Dragon, a fantasy-adventure film, was released in March 2021. Due to the COVID-19 pandemic, it was released simultaneously in theaters and on Disney+ with Premier Access. The film was accompanied in theaters with the animated short Us Again. Raya and the Last Dragon grossed over $130 million at the box office and became a hit on the streaming charts after its Premier Access charge expired on Disney+. The film became the third most streamed film title of 2021. The film also received a nomination for the Academy Award for Best Animated Feature.

In August 2021, it was reported that Disney Animation was opening a new animation studio in Vancouver. Operations at the Vancouver studio started in 2022, with former Disney Animation finance lead Amir Nasrabadi serving as head for the studio. The Vancouver studio works on the animation for the Disney+-exclusive long-form series and future Disney+ specials, while the short-form series are animated at the Burbank studio. Pre-production and storyboarding for the long-form series and specials also take place at the Burbank studio.

In November 2021, the studio released Encanto, a musical-fantasy film. Due to the COVID-19 pandemic, the film was given an exclusive 30-day theatrical run in theaters and was released to Disney+ on December 24, 2021. It was released in theaters with the 2D/CG hybrid short Far from the Tree. Although Encanto was not able to break-even at the box office by grossing $256 million against its $120–150 million budget, it went viral over the 2021 holiday season and achieved wider commercial success after its digital release to Disney+. The film went on to win the Academy Award for Best Animated Feature, and received Academy Award nominations for Best Original Score and Best Original Song.

In November 2022, the studio released the action-adventure film Strange World. Although the film received positive reviews, it was a box-office failure, grossing $73 million worldwide on a budget of $135–180 million, with an estimated loss of $100–147 million.

By 2023, the studio had opened a new apprentice program for hand-drawn animators. That same year, the live-action/animated short film Once Upon a Studio was released to celebrate Disney's 100th anniversary, which occurred in October 2023. It went on to win the award for Outstanding Animated Short Form Program at the 3rd Children's and Family Emmy Awards.

The 2D/CG hybrid musical-fantasy film Wish was released in November 2023. The film's theme is inspired by Disney's 100th anniversary. It received mixed reviews from critics and grossed roughly $255 million worldwide against a production budget of $175–200 million, resulting in a loss of an estimated $131 million. The film was nominated for several awards, including the Golden Globe Award for Best Animated Feature Film.

The studio provided both CG and hand-drawn animation for the Disney Parks ride Tiana's Bayou Adventure, which opened in 2024 and is inspired by The Princess and the Frog.

In September 2024, Lee announced that she was stepping down from her position as Disney Animation's chief creative officer to return to full-time filmmaking at the studio—specifically, to direct and write Frozen 3 and also to write and executive produce Frozen 4. Jared Bush was named as her successor.

The studio released the sequel Moana 2 in November 2024. The project was originally under development as a series for Disney+ before being reworked into a theatrical feature film. The film received mixed reviews and was a commercial success, grossing over $1 billion worldwide.

In November 2025, the sequel Zootopia 2 was released. The film was a commercial success, grossing $1 billion and won the BAFTA Award for Best Animated Film. It was also nominated for Best Animated Feature at the 98th Academy Awards as well as Best Motion Picture – Animated and Cinematic and Box Office Achievement at the 83rd Golden Globe Awards. On December 31, 2025, Zootopia 2 surpassed Frozen 2 to become the studio's top-grossing movie of all time. The following month, it surpassed Pixar's Inside Out 2 to become Hollywood's highest-grossing animated film in history.

== Production logo ==
Excerpt of Mickey Mouse short Steamboat Willie on which the production logo used since 2007 was based.

Until 2007, Walt Disney Animation Studios did not use a traditional production logo, using the standard Walt Disney Pictures logo instead. Starting with the 2007 film Meet the Robinsons, an on-screen production logo based on Steamboat Willie was added. The logo has had variants, such as a pixelated version used in the 2012 film Wreck-It Ralph.

Despite Steamboat Willie entering the public domain in 2024, as it was published in 1928, the logo remains in use.

== Studio ==
=== Leadership ===
==== Current ====
- Jared Bush, Chief Creative Officer (September 2024 – present)
- Clark Spencer, President (August 2019 – present)
- John Nallen, Chief Operating Officer
- Viet Dinh, Chief Legal Officer
- Steve Tomsic, Chief Financial Officer
- John Gelke, Vice President, Global Operations
- J. Young, Sr. Vice President, Growth
- Gerard Devan, Group Executive APAC
- Stephanie Gruber, Group Executive Television
- Christopher Greavu, Vice President of Sales

==== Past Leadership ====
- Andrew Millstein, President (November 2014 – July 2019)
- Edwin Catmull, President (June 2007 – July 2019)
- David Stainton, President (January 2003 – January 2006)
- Thomas Schumacher, President (January 1999 – December 2002)
- Peter Schneider, President (1985 – January 1999)
- John Lasseter, Chief Creative Officer (January 2006 – June 2018)
- Jennifer Lee, Chief Creative Officer (June 2018 – September 2024)
- Roy E. Disney, Chairman (1984–2009)

=== Locations ===
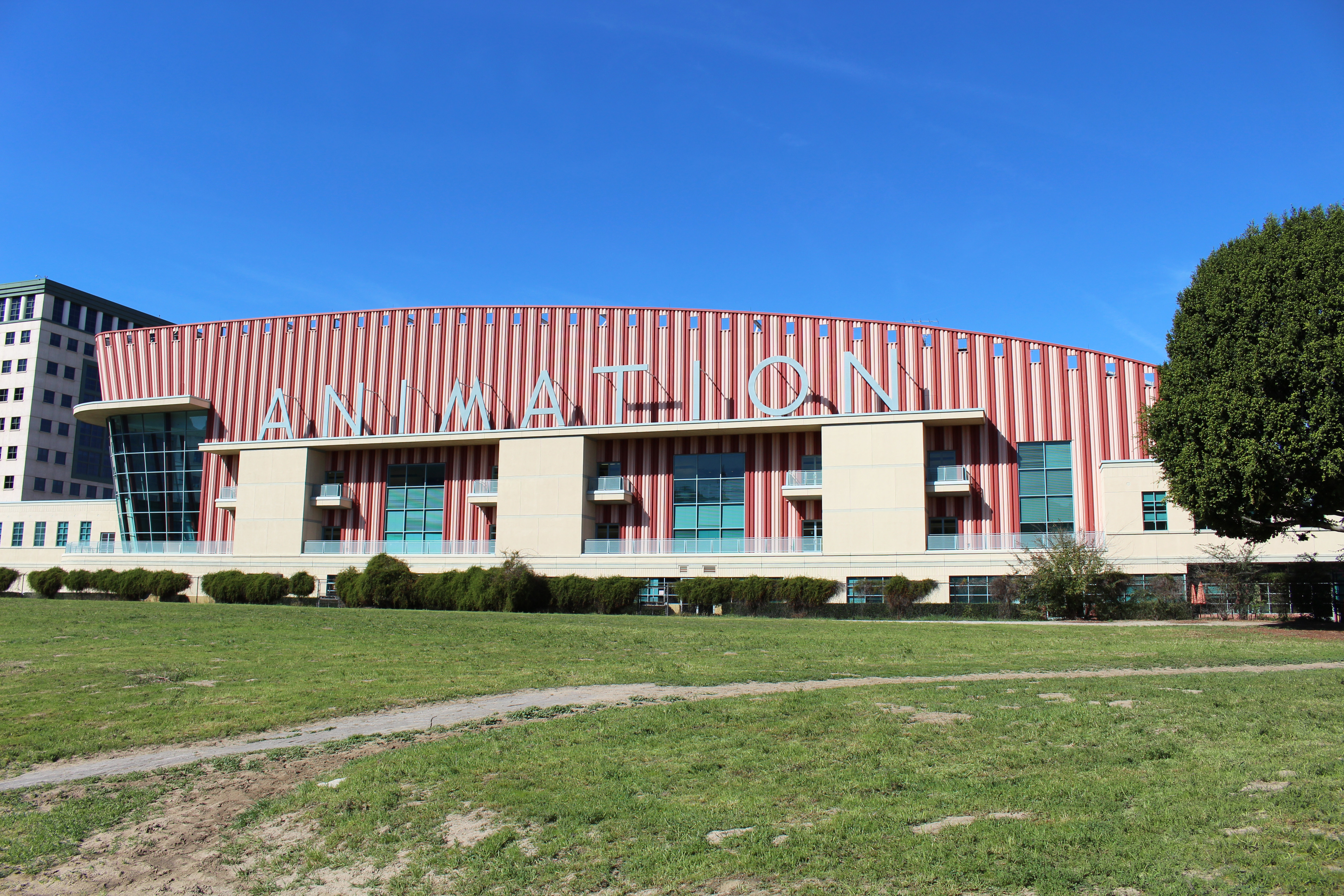
The south side of the Roy E. Disney Animation Building, as seen from the public park that separates it from the Ventura Freeway.

Since 1995, Walt Disney Animation Studios has been headquartered in the Roy E. Disney Animation Building in Burbank, California, across Riverside Drive from the Walt Disney Studios, where the original Animation building (now housing corporate offices) is located. The Disney Animation Building's lobby is capped by a large version of the magic sorcerer hat from the "Sorcerer's Apprentice" segment of Fantasia (1940), and the building is informally called the "hat building" for that reason.

Until the mid-1990s, Disney Animation previously operated out of the Air Way complex, a cluster of old hangars, office buildings, and trailers in the Grand Central Business Centre, an industrial park on the site of the former Grand Central Airport about two miles (3.2 km) east in the city of Glendale. The Disneytoon Studios unit was based in Glendale. Disney Animation's archive, formerly known as "the morgue" (based on an analogy to a morgue file) and today known as the Animation Research Library, is also located in Glendale. Unlike the Burbank buildings, the ARL is located in a nondescript office building near Disney's Grand Central Creative Campus. The 12,000-square-foot ARL is home to over 64 million items of animation artwork dating back to 1924; because of its importance to the company, visitors are required to agree not to disclose its exact location within Glendale.

Previously, feature animation satellite studios were located around the world in Montreuil, Seine-Saint-Denis, France (a suburb of Paris), and in Bay Lake, Florida (near Orlando, at Disney's Hollywood Studios theme park). The Paris studio was shut down in 2002, while the Florida studio was shut down in 2004. The Florida animation building survives as an office building, while the former Magic of Disney Animation section of the building is home to Star Wars Launch Bay.

In the wake of Roy E. Disney's death in 2009, the Burbank headquarters were re-dedicated the Roy E. Disney Animation Building in May 2010.

In November 2014, Disney Animation commenced a 16-month upgrade of the Roy E. Disney Animation Building, in order to fix what then-studio president Edwin Catmull had called its "dungeon-like" interior. For example, the interior was so cramped that it could not easily accommodate "town hall" meetings with all employees in attendance. Due to the renovation, the studio's employees were temporarily moved from Burbank into the closest available Disney-controlled studio space – the Disneytoon Studios building in the industrial park in Glendale and the old Imagineering warehouse in North Hollywood under the western approach to Bob Hope Airport (the Tujunga Building). The renovation was completed in October 2016.

== Filmography ==
=== Feature films ===
Release timeline
1937	Snow White and the Seven Dwarfs
1938
1939
1940	Pinocchio
1940	Fantasia
1941	Dumbo
1942	Bambi
1943	Saludos Amigos
1944
1945	The Three Caballeros
1946	Make Mine Music
1947	Fun and Fancy Free
1948	Melody Time
1949	The Adventures of Ichabod and Mr. Toad
1950	Cinderella
1951	Alice in Wonderland
1952
1953	Peter Pan
1954
1955	Lady and the Tramp
1956
1957
1958
1959	Sleeping Beauty
1960
1961	One Hundred and One Dalmatians
1962
1963	The Sword in the Stone
1964
1965
1966
1967	The Jungle Book
1968
1969
1970	The Aristocats
1971
1972
1973	Robin Hood
1974
1975
1976
1977	The Many Adventures of Winnie the Pooh
1977	The Rescuers
1978
1979
1980
1981	The Fox and the Hound
1982
1983
1984
1985	The Black Cauldron
1986	The Great Mouse Detective
1987
1988	Oliver & Company
1989	The Little Mermaid
1990	The Rescuers Down Under
1991	Beauty and the Beast
1992	Aladdin
1993
1994	The Lion King
1995	Pocahontas
1996	The Hunchback of Notre Dame
1997	Hercules
1998	Mulan
1999	Tarzan
1999	Fantasia 2000
2000	Dinosaur
2000	The Emperor's New Groove
2001	Atlantis: The Lost Empire
2002	Lilo & Stitch
2002	Treasure Planet
2003	Brother Bear
2004	Home on the Range
2005	Chicken Little
2006
2007	Meet the Robinsons
2008	Bolt
2009	The Princess and the Frog
2010	Tangled
2011	Winnie the Pooh
2012	Wreck-It Ralph
2013	Frozen
2014	Big Hero 6
2015
2016	Zootopia
2016	Moana
2017
2018	Ralph Breaks the Internet
2019	Frozen 2
2020
2021	Raya and the Last Dragon
2021	Encanto
2022	Strange World
2023	Wish
2024	Moana 2
2025	Zootopia 2
2026	Hexed
2027	Frozen 3
2028	Clay
TBA	Moana 3
TBA	Zootopia 3
TBA	Frozen 4

Walt Disney Animation Studios has produced animated features in a series of animation techniques, including traditional animation, computer animation, combination of both and animation combined with live-action scenes. The studio's first film, Snow White and the Seven Dwarfs, was released on December 21, 1937, and their most recent film, Zootopia 2, was released on November 26, 2025.

Starting with Chicken Little (2005), most of their films have cost between $150–175 million. Tangled (2010) is the studio's most expensive film, with a budget of $260 million.

==== Upcoming films ====
The studio's next film will be the original film Hexed, scheduled for release on November 25, 2026. In addition, sequel Frozen 3 is scheduled to be released on November 24, 2027. Another original film Clay is scheduled to be released on November 22, 2028.

=== Short films ===
Since Alice Comedies in the 1920s, Walt Disney Animation Studios has produced a series of prominent short films, including the Mickey Mouse cartoons and the Silly Symphonies series, until the cartoon studio division was closed in 1956. Many of these shorts provided a medium for the studio to experiment with new technologies that they would use in their filmmaking process, such as the synchronization of sound in Steamboat Willie (1928), the integration of the three-strip Technicolor process in Flowers and Trees (1932), the multiplane camera in The Old Mill (1937), the xerography process in Goliath II (1960), and the hand-drawn/CGI hybrid animation in Off His Rockers (1992), Paperman (2012), Get a Horse! (2013), and Feast (2014).

=== Television programming ===
Walt Disney Animation Studios announced its expansion into television programming in 2020 and produced original shows for Disney+. However, in March 2025, the studio announced that all television series in production and development had been shelved as the studio pivoted away from longform content for streaming in favor of returning their focus to theatrical feature films.

Title	Network	Original run	Notes
Short Circuit	Disney+	2020–26	Shorts
Zenimation	Disney+	2020–21	Shorts
How to Stay at Home	Disney+	2021	Shorts
Olaf Presents	Disney+	2021	Shorts
Baymax!	Disney+	2022	TV series
Zootopia+	Disney+	2022	TV series
Iwájú	Disney+	2024	TV series; co-production with Kugali Media and Cinesite

=== Franchises ===
This list includes film series and/or franchises featuring theatrical films, short films, and television series produced by either Walt Disney Animation Studios or follow-ups of them made by Disney's direct-to-video/television units such as Disney Television Animation or Disneytoon Studios through the years, as well as live-action films, and other media like books or video games, as well as theme park attractions.

Titles	Release dates
Mickey Mouse & Friends	1928
Silly Symphonies	1929
Snow White	1937
Pinocchio	1940
Fantasia	1940
Dumbo	1941
Bambi	1942
Cinderella	1950
Alice in Wonderland	1951
Peter Pan	1953
Lady and the Tramp	1955
Sleeping Beauty	1959
101 Dalmatians	1961
Winnie the Pooh	1966
The Jungle Book	1967
The Rescuers	1977
The Fox and the Hound	1981
The Little Mermaid	1989
Beauty and the Beast	1991
Aladdin	1992
The Lion King	1994
Pocahontas	1995
The Hunchback of Notre Dame	1996
Hercules	1997
Mulan	1998
Tarzan	1999
The Emperor's New Groove	2000
Atlantis	2001
Lilo & Stitch	2002
Brother Bear	2003
The Princess and the Frog	2009
Prep & Landing	2009
Tangled	2010
Wreck-It Ralph	2012
Frozen	2013
Big Hero 6	2014
Zootopia	2016
Moana	2016
Encanto	2021

=== Highest-grossing films ===
† Indicates films playing in theatres in the week commencing 20 November 2026.

Rank	Title	Year	Box office gross
1	Frozen 2	2019	$477,373,578
2	Moana 2	2024	$460,072,062
3	Zootopia 2	2025	$428,130,160
4	The Lion King	1994	$424,979,720
5	Frozen	2013	$400,738,009
6	Zootopia	2016	$341,268,248
7	Moana	2016	$248,757,044
8	Big Hero 6	2014	$222,527,828
9	Beauty and the Beast	1991	$218,967,620
10	Aladdin	1992	$217,350,219
11	Ralph Breaks the Internet	2018	$201,091,711
12	Tangled	2010	$200,821,936
13	Wreck-It Ralph	2012	$189,422,889
14	Snow White and the Seven Dwarfs	1937	$184,925,486
15	Tarzan	1999	$171,091,819
16	Lilo & Stitch	2002	$145,794,338
17	One Hundred and One Dalmatians	1961	$144,880,014
18	The Jungle Book	1967	$141,843,612
19	Pocahontas	1995	$141,579,773
20	Dinosaur	2000	$137,748,063
21	Chicken Little	2005	$135,386,665
22	Bolt	2008	$114,053,579
23	The Little Mermaid	1989	$111,543,479
24	The Princess and the Frog	2009	$104,400,899
25	Bambi	1942	$102,247,150
26	The Hunchback of Notre Dame	1996	$100,138,851
27	Hercules	1997	$99,112,101
28	Meet the Robinsons	2007	$97,822,171
29	Encanto	2021	$96,093,622
30	Lady and the Tramp	1955	$93,602,326

Highest-grossing films worldwide
Rank	Title	Year	Box office gross
1	Zootopia 2	2025	$1,870,309,291
2	Frozen 2	2019	$1,453,683,476
3	Frozen	2013	$1,290,000,000
4	Moana 2	2024	$1,059,269,477
5	Zootopia	2016	$1,025,521,689
6	The Lion King	1994	$979,046,652
7	Moana	2016	$687,229,282
8	Big Hero 6	2014	$657,870,525
9	Tangled	2010	$592,472,813
10	Ralph Breaks the Internet	2018	$529,323,962
11	Aladdin	1992	$504,050,219
12	Wreck-It Ralph	2012	$471,222,889
13	Tarzan	1999	$448,191,819
14	Beauty and the Beast	1991	$438,656,843
15	Snow White and the Seven Dwarfs	1937	$418,200,000
16	The Jungle Book	1967	$378,000,000
17	Dinosaur	2000	$349,822,765
18	Pocahontas	1995	$346,079,773
19	Bolt	2008	$328,015,029
20	The Hunchback of Notre Dame	1996	$325,338,851
21	Chicken Little	2005	$314,432,837
22	Mulan	1998	$304,320,254
23	One Hundred and One Dalmatians	1961	$303,000,000
24	Lilo & Stitch	2002	$273,144,151
25	Bambi	1942	$267,447,150
26	The Princess and the Frog	2009	$270,997,378
27	Cinderella	1950	$271,732,564
28	Encanto	2021	$261,292,688
29	Wish	2023	$254,997,360
30	Hercules	1997	$252,712,101

== See also ==
- The Walt Disney Company
- Disney's Nine Old Men
- 12 basic principles of animation
- Walt Disney Home Video (VHS)
- Walt Disney Treasures
- Disney Animation: The Illusion of Life
- Modern animation in the United States: Disney
- Animation studios owned by The Walt Disney Company
- Disneytoon Studios
- Circle Seven Animation
- Pixar
- Pixar Canada
- Fox Animation Studios
- Blue Sky Studios
- 20th Century Animation
- List of Disney theatrical animated feature films
- Disney Television Animation
- List of animation studios

=== Documentary films about Disney animation ===
- A Trip Through the Walt Disney Studios (1937, short)
- The Reluctant Dragon (1941, a staged "mockumentary")
- Frank and Ollie (1995)
- Dream On Silly Dreamer (2005)
- Waking Sleeping Beauty (2009)
- Walt & El Grupo (2009)
- Howard (2018)

== Sources ==
- Barrier, Michael (1999). Hollywood Cartoons: American Animation in Its Golden Age. New York: Oxford University Press. ISBN 9780198020790. OCLC 436041091.
- Gabler, Neal (2006), Walt Disney: The Triumph of the American Imagination, New York: Random House, ISBN 0-679-43822-X
- Stewart, James (2005), DisneyWar, New York: Simon and Schuster, ISBN 0-684-80993-1
