= Randy Cartwright =

American animator

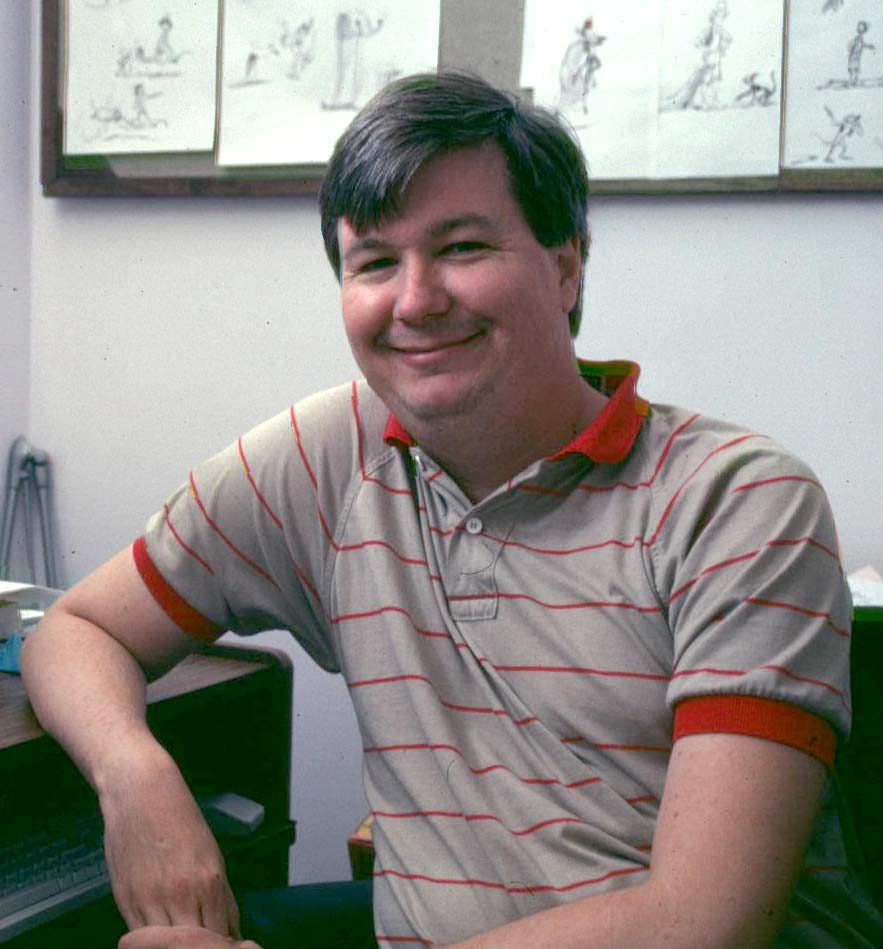
- At the Disney Studio in 1991
- Born: Victor Randolph Cartwright; October 31, 1951 (age 74); Virginia, United States
- Occupation: Animator
- Years active: 1974–present
- Spouse: Junko Fujii (m. 1985)
- Children: Mariel Cartwright; Elden Cartwright
- Awards: Academy Scientific and Technical Award

Randy Cartwright (born October 31, 1951, in Virginia) is an American animator.

== Career ==
Randy Cartwright graduated from UCLA in 1974, where he made his student animated film, Room and Board, which won several awards and was included in the Fantastic Animation Festival. While going to school he worked at Disneyland in the character department and portrayed Pluto, Practical Pig, Dopey, Prince John and many other characters during the three years he worked there.

In 1975 he was accepted into the Walt Disney Studios animation training program headed by the veteran Disney animator Eric Larson. He began his career as an inbetweener for Ollie Johnston on The Rescuers and progressed to full animator on Pete's Dragon.

Ollie asked Cartwright to work with him on The Fox and the Hound in 1981. When Ollie retired to write the book, The Illusion of Life with co-veteran animator Frank Thomas, Randy inherited Ollie's supervising animator assignments for the characters of Chief and the adult Copper.

After animating on Mickey's Christmas Carol and doing early experimental animation for Who Framed Roger Rabbit, he received an offer to work for TMS in Japan training animators on Little Nemo: Adventures in Slumberland. From there, he moved to Taiwan as a directing animator on The Brave Little Toaster.

In 1986, he returned to Disney as the Artistic Lead for the Disney CAPS development team. He combined his knowledge of animation with an understanding of computers to help design and build the first fully digital animation production system. He won a Scientific or Technical Academy Award for this work.

He animated Belle in Beauty and the Beast and became the directing animator for the Magic Carpet in Aladdin. He went on to animate on Zazu for The Lion King and moved into the story department for Hercules.

He headed the story departments for the DreamWorks films, Antz and Shrek.

He also worked at Disney with John Musker and Ron Clements storyboarding and animating on The Princess and the Frog.

He filmed two Super 8 sound home movies of the Disney animation department in 1980, 1983 with John Lasseter as his cameraman. He also filmed one more in 1990 on video tape which was 10 years to the day of the first movie with Joe Ranft as the cameraman. Excerpts of these movies have been seen in the documentary The Pixar Story and more extensively in Waking Sleeping Beauty.

== Filmography ==
| Year | Title | Credits | Characters |
|---|---|---|---|
| 1974 | Room and Board (Short) | Producer / Writer / Director / Animation | |
| 1977 | Fantastic Animation Festival | Animator: "Room and Board" | |
| 1977 | The Rescuers | Assistant Animator (uncredited) | |
| 1977 | Pete's Dragon | Character Animator | |
| 1979 | Doctor of Doom (Short) | Voice / Sound Engineering | Rosita's Father's Voice / Rosita's Voice / Pepe's Voice / Monster's Voice (Voice) |
| 1981 | The Fox and the Hound | Supervising Animator | Adult Copper and Chief |
| 1982 | Luau (Short) | Cinematographer / Voice | Bartender |
| 1983 | Mickey's Christmas Carol (Short) | Animator | |
| 1987 | The Brave Little Toaster | Directing Animator | |
| 1990 | The Rescuers Down Under | Digital Production System Development Artist | |
| 1991 | Beauty and the Beast | Animator | Belle |
| 1992 | Aladdin | Supervising Animator | Magic Carpet |
| 1994 | The Lion King | Animator | Zazu |
| 1995 | Pocahontas | Additional Story Development Artist | |
| 1996 | Quack Pack (TV Series) | Storyboard - 1 Episode | |
| 1997 | Hercules | Story | |
| 1998 | Antz | Head of Story | |
| 1998 | The Prince of Egypt | Additional Story Artist | |
| 2000 | Chicken Run | Additional Story Artist | |
| 2000 | The Road to El Dorado | Additional Storyboard Artist | |
| 2001 | Morto the Magician (Short) | Special Thanks | |
| 2001 | Shrek | Co-Head of Story | |
| 2003 | Passing the Baton (Video documentary short) | Special Thanks | |
| 2003 | Sinbad: Legend of the Seven Seas | Additional Story Artist | |
| 2003 | Pirates of the Caribbean: The Curse of the Black Pearl | Animator: ILM | |
| 2004 | The Polar Express | Character Animator | |
| 2005 | Dream On Silly Dreamer (Documentary short) | Himself / Archive Footage Provider | |
| 2005 | Madagascar | Additional Story Artist | |
| 2006 | Charlotte's Web | Animation Advisor | |
| 2007 | The Pixar Story (Documentary) | Himself / Additional Archival Materials | |
| 2009 | The Princess and the Frog | Story Artist / Animator | Prince Naveen |
| 2010 | Waking Sleeping Beauty (Documentary) | Himself | |
| 2011 | Hop | Storyboard Artist | |
| 2013 - 2017 | Sofia the First (TV Series) | Storyboard Artist - 6 Episodes / Storyboard Revisionist - 1 Episode | |
