= Howard (film) =

2018 documentary film by Don Hahn

- Official release poster
- Directed by: Don Hahn
- Written by: Don Hahn
- Produced by: Lori Korngiebel; Jonathan Polenz
- Starring: Howard Ashman; Sarah Gillespie; Jeffrey Katzenberg; Bill Lauch; Alan Menken; Peter Schneider; Jodi Benson; Paige O'Hara
- Edited by: Stephen Yao
- Music by: Alan Menken (score); Chris Bacon (adaptation)
- Production company: Stone Circle Pictures
- Distributed by: Disney+
- Release dates: April 22, 2018 (Tribeca Film Festival); December 18, 2018 (United States)
- Running time: 92 minutes
- Country: United States
- Language: English

Howard is a 2018 American documentary film written and directed by Don Hahn about the life of songwriter Howard Ashman. It received positive reviews from critics.

== Summary ==
The film documents the life of songwriter Howard Ashman, who wrote the lyrics for the songs in the Disney animated films The Little Mermaid, Beauty and the Beast and Aladdin, as well as the stage musical, Little Shop of Horrors, and died from HIV/AIDS in 1991.

The film uses the same interview presentation as Hahn's previous documentary, Waking Sleeping Beauty, where rather than "talking heads", audio interviews are used with "speech bubbles" indicating who is speaking.

== Music ==
Alan Menken composed the score for the film, while Chris Bacon adapted it. Menken, who worked with Ashman on several projects until the latter's death, first became involved with the project during the 2017–18 Christmas season; when Hahn showed a reel of the movie to Menken, he told Hahn that "[he has] to score this movie". Hahn originally opposed, as the budget wouldn't allow him to pay Menken, but agreed once Menken told Hahn that he saw the project as his opportunity to create a musical homage to Ashman.

According to Hahn, Menken composed the score during the holiday season, and describe his score as "one of the most personal and touching scores that [he had heard] from him". Menken said that he wanted to "find a motif that simply expressed [his] feelings about Howard". Menken also said that the score has "a childlike quality to it, certainly, a simplicity to it. There's a certain shimmering and anticipation of a door opening and what happens just before it's revealed - this thing [Hahn has] created".

== Release ==
Howard premiered at the 2018 Tribeca Film Festival and was nominated for the Best Documentary Award at the 2018 Heartland Film Festival. It had a limited theatrical run beginning on December 18, 2018.

=== Streaming ===
Howard was released on Disney+ on August 7, 2020. On May 18, 2023, it was announced that Disney+ would be removing nearly 60 original films and series from the platform on May 26 to "cut costs," with this film being one of them. The news sparked widespread backlash from both Disney fans and the LGBTQ+ community, especially with the move coming on the eve of Pride Month and the release of the live-action remake of The Little Mermaid on the same day as its intended removal. Disney+ announced the following day that the film would remain on the service.

== Reception ==
=== Critical response ===
On the review aggregation website Rotten Tomatoes, the film has an approval rating of 94% based on 47 reviews, with an average rating of 8.1/10. The critical consensus reads, "Howard serves as a bittersweet tribute to the life and legacy of a brilliant artist whose timeless songs served as the soundtrack for a generation of Disney fans." On Metacritic, the film has a weighted average score of 76 out of 100, based on 13 critics, indicating "generally favorable" reviews.

Frank Scheck of The Hollywood Reporter stated the documentary provides an insightful commentary, with a large and fascinating amount of archival footage, and called Howard a tribute to Howard Ashman, writing, "It succeeds beautifully in inducing both joy and sorrow: joy at the remarkable work Ashman produced, and sorrow that he left us so early and deprived us of the talent that still had so much to give." Melissa Leon of The Daily Beast found the documentary touching, and said it manages to highlight Ashman's personal life and his work, stating, "The film is riddled with gems from the production of now-iconic films [...] and insight into the life and legacy of a man whose lyrics everyone knows, yet whose premature death fewer are familiar with."

Peter Travers of Rolling Stone rated the documentary 4 out of 5 stars, found the film to be a moving tribute to Ashman, writing, "Such blunt honesty and rare introspection sets Howard apart from the usual cut-and-paste trips down memory lane." Peter Bradshaw of The Guardian called the documentary exciting and emotional, saying the film immerses its audience in the life of a creative artist, stating, "Ashman set a standard of flair, invention and Broadway-style showmanship in Disney lyrics that continues to this day." Jennifer Green of Common Sense Media rated the film 4 out of 5 stars, praised the depiction of positive messages and role models, citing creativity and solidarity, saying, "Howard is a moving documentary that offers both a behind-the-scenes look at the making of some modern-classic Disney animated films and the poignant life story of an exceptionally talented man."

=== Accolades ===
Year	Award	Category	Recipients	Result	Ref.
2018	Heartland International Film Festival	Documentary Feature	Howard	Nominated	
2020	Critics' Choice Documentary Awards	Best Historical/Biographical Documentary	Howard	Nominated	
2021	Annie Awards	Special Achievement in Animation	Don Hahn	Won	
2021	GLAAD Media Awards	Outstanding Documentary	Howard	Nominated	

== See also ==
- Waking Sleeping Beauty
