= Hand Held (film) =

2010 American documentary feature film

- Film poster
- Directed by: Don Hahn
- Produced by: Don Hahn
- Music by: Steve Morrell
- Release date: February 27, 2010 (Boston)
- Country: United States

Hand Held is a 2010 documentary feature film about photojournalist Mike Carroll, one of the first photographers to travel to Romania after the fall of the communist regime of Nicolae Ceaușescu in 1989. When he arrived, he walked into one of the most horrific scenes of the 20th century. His photographs and heart wrenching stories of the pediatric AIDS epidemic in Romania ran in the Boston Globe and New York Times and opened the eyes of the western world to the plight of Romanian children. The film chronicles Carroll's twenty-year journey to bring aid to children in a country he hardly knew, through the organization he founded, Romanian Children's Relief (RCR).

The film is produced and directed by Don Hahn. After a charity premiere at WGBH in Boston, the film was selected for participation in the Heartland Film Festival, and has been the official selection of the Boulder International Film Festival, Newport Beach Film Festival, and the Rhode Island International Film Festival. Hand Held's European premiere was in Bucharest in late 2010. The director Don Hahn and subject Mike Carroll were introduced by United States Ambassador Mark Gitenstein who was in attendance at the premiere.
