= Peter Schneider (film executive) =

American film executive, film producer and theatrical producer

President of The Walt Disney Studios
- In office January 1999 – June 2001
- Preceded by: David Hoberman
- Succeeded by: See Walt Disney Studios

President of Walt Disney Feature Animation
- In office 1985 – January 1999
- Preceded by: Roy E. Disney as chairman
- Succeeded by: Thomas Schumacher

Personal details
- Born: November 10, 1950 (age 75) Milwaukee, Wisconsin, U.S.
- Occupation: Producer

Peter Schneider (born November 10, 1950) is an American film executive, film producer and theatrical producer.

== Career ==
Schneider headed Disney's feature animation division from 1985 to 1999, overseeing films including Aladdin and The Lion King.

He was promoted to studio chief in 1999. In 2001, Schneider left Disney to form his own theater production company. His first major production, developed in association with Michael Reno, was Sister Act which opened at the London Palladium in 2009. Peter graduated from Purdue University in 1972 with a theater degree.

Along with producer Don Hahn, Schneider produced a documentary entitled Waking Sleeping Beauty in 2009, which focused on the revival of Disney animation during the 1980s and early 1990s.

Schneider is also a world champion contract bridge player, having won the World Transnational Open Teams Championship in 2005. He holds the World Bridge Federation rank of World Life Master.
