= Don Hahn =

American film producer (born 1955)

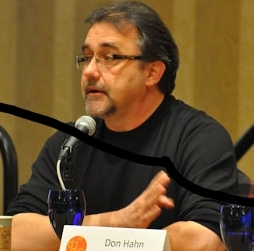
- Hahn in 2012
- Born: Donald Paul Hahn; November 26, 1955 (age 70); Chicago, Illinois, United States
- Occupations: Artist; film producer; film director
- Years active: 1977–present
- Spouse: Denise Meara-Hahn (1987–present)
- Website: donhahn.com

Donald Paul Hahn (born November 26, 1955) is an American film producer. He served as a producer for the Disney films Beauty and the Beast (1991, the first out of three animated films to be nominated for the Academy Award for Best Picture), The Lion King (1994), The Hunchback of Notre Dame (1996), Atlantis: The Lost Empire (2001), and The Haunted Mansion (2003).

Hahn has executive produced films by Disneynature since 2007, and founded the company Stone Circle Pictures in 2008 to produce the animation documentary film Waking Sleeping Beauty (2009).

== Early life ==
Hahn was born in Chicago, Illinois. His father was a Lutheran minister. When Hahn was three, his family moved to Bellflower, California, where he went to school and shot his first animated shorts in the high school film club. His family then moved to Burbank, California, when he was a teenager. He graduated from North Hollywood High School (where he was a drum major) in 1973, went on to study music at Los Angeles Valley College, and majored in Music and minored in fine art at California State University Northridge. At both colleges, he was also a drum major as he also was in the Royal Cavaliers Youth Band of Van Nuys, California. He was a percussionist in the Los Angeles Junior Philharmonic Orchestra. He worked as a drum head tester for Remo Inc. and was the percussion instructor at Notre Dame High School to put himself through college.

== Career ==
He began his career in animation working for Disney Legend Wolfgang Reitherman as an assistant director on The Fox and the Hound. He worked closely with director Don Bluth on the production of Pete's Dragon and even worked in Bluth's garage on the animated short Banjo the Woodpile Cat. He later became production manager of The Black Cauldron (1985) and The Great Mouse Detective before moving on as an associate producer of Disney/Amblin's Who Framed Roger Rabbit (1988).

In 1989, Hahn made his first mark as producer for Disney and Amblin Entertainment's first Roger Rabbit short, Tummy Trouble, producing along with Steven Spielberg, Kathleen Kennedy, and Frank Marshall. He then became the producer for the benchmark animated feature, 1991's Beauty and the Beast, which was the first animated film to be nominated for the Oscar for Best Picture. His next production, 1994's The Lion King, set worldwide box office records for an animated film and quickly became the highest grossing traditionally animated film in history. In 1996 he produced The Hunchback of Notre Dame, and in 2000 he was an executive producer on The Emperor's New Groove.

Hahn directed Steve Martin, James Earl Jones, Quincy Jones, Itzhak Perlman, and Angela Lansbury in the host sequences of Fantasia 2000. The next year in 2001, Atlantis: The Lost Empire was released for which he was producer. Atlantis performed poorly at the box office, even lower than his previous films. In 2003, Hahn reunited with Lion King co-director Rob Minkoff to produce The Haunted Mansion starring Eddie Murphy, making it Hahn's first live-action film to produce.

== Later works ==
He also produced the Oscar-nominated animated short Lorenzo (2004).

In 2006, Hahn was interim head of Disney's animation division during its successful merger with Pixar. Hahn received his second Academy Award nomination that same year in the category of Best Animated Short for The Little Match Girl, an adaptation of the classic Hans Christian Andersen tale which was originally intended for inclusion in a version of Fantasia.

Hahn was Executive Producer for the landmark nature film "Earth" the premiere film project from the Disneynature film label. In 2010 he once again served as Executive Producer on “Oceans" the epic documentary on the seas, and 2011's "African Cats" from Disneynature.

Three of his films have been adapted into stage musicals: Beauty and the Beast, The Lion King and The Hunchback of Notre Dame. In all, his films have been nominated for 18 Academy Awards.

Hahn produced the remake of Tim Burton's Oscar-nominated Frankenweenie.

At the 2015 D23 Expo, which marked the 20th anniversary of The Lion King, it was announced that a new film titled The Lion Guard: Return of the Roar would be released. Hahn was introduced to the crowd, and told them the history of the Lion King franchise and informed the audience that the new film as well as its follow up series will continue the original film's story, before introducing the executive producer of the new film; Ford Riley.

== Documentaries ==
Waking Sleeping Beauty is Don Hahn's feature directorial debut. The film is the true story of the perfect storm of people and circumstances that led to the animation renaissance of the 1980s and 1990s. The film had its world premiere at the 2009 Toronto Film Festival, and won the audience award at the Hampton's Film Festival. It offers a candid perspective of what happened in the creative ranks set against the dynamic tensions among the top leadership, Michael Eisner, Jeffrey Katzenberg and Roy E. Disney.

Hand Held is Hahn's second documentary feature. When Hahn took a year sabbatical from his job at Disney, he set out to make a very personal film about photographer Mike Carroll, one of the first photojournalists to uncover the pediatric AIDS epidemic in post communist eastern Europe. Hahn filmed extensively in Bucharest, Transylvania, and in Carroll's home town of Boston.

Christmas With Walt Disney (2009) is a feature documentary commissioned by the Walt Disney Family Museum and directed by Hahn. The film chronicles Disney's life as husband, father, and film maker centered around the holidays. Hahn directed the film, narrated by Walt Disney's daughter Diane Disney Miller. The film runs every holiday season at the Walt Disney Family Museum in San Francisco.

Hahn serves as executive producer of numerous Disneynature documentaries such as Earth, Oceans, and African Cats all of which placed in the top five nature movies of all time. He is Executive Producer on the Alastair Fothergill, Mark Linfield directed Chimpanzee.

== Books ==
In January 1999, Hyperion Books published Hahn's book on creativity called "Dancing Corndogs in the Night." The best selling book is a case study of the human creative spirit. Don has also written three books on Animation (one of which is "Animation Magic" from Disney Press).

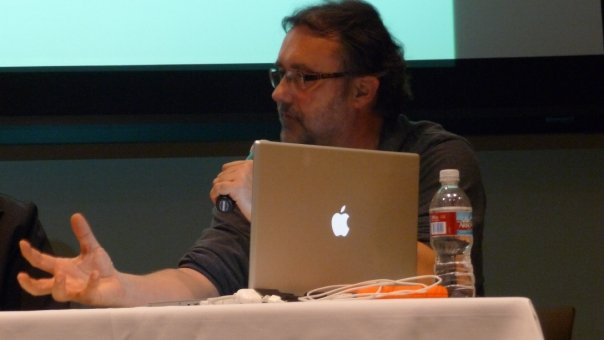
Hahn leads a panel on the work of Walt Stanchfield at Comicon 2009.

Hahn's book "Alchemy of Animation" became an extremely popular book on the process of making an animated film. The text covered traditional hand drawn animation as well as 3D digital animation, visual effects and stop motion animation. Animation World Network wrote that "Whether you're a veteran story artist, or you're trying to land your first studio job as an in-betweener, or you're delivering coffee and donuts to the higher-ups or if you're just a fan of animation, you'll want to add this to your bookshelf."

Early in his career, Hahn set up and managed the Disney School of Animation, an internal training program for a generation of young artists coming up within the Disney Studio animation department. The program was mentored by veteran animators Eric Larson and Walt Stanchfield. In the spring of 2009 Focal Press released the landmark book "Drawn to Life" by Walt Stanchfield which Don edited. "It was a dream project for me to bring the complete works of Walt to print," said Hahn. "Stanchfield was a brilliant teacher, and my personal mentor, and it's a thrill to be able to publish his work to inspire generations to come."

== Filmography ==
Year	Title	Credits
1978	The Small One (Short)	Production Assistant
1981	The Fox and the Hound	Assistant Director
1983	Mickey's Christmas Carol (Short)	Production Assistant
1985	The Black Cauldron	Production Manager
1988	Who Framed Roger Rabbit	Associate Producer
1989	Tummy Trouble (Short)	Producer
1991	Beauty and the Beast	Producer
1994	The Lion King	Producer
1996	The Hunchback of Notre Dame	Producer
1996	Quack Pack (TV Series)	Producer - 1 Episode
2000	Fantasia 2000	Director / Writer - Host Sequences
2000	The Emperor's New Groove	Executive Producer
2001	Atlantis: The Lost Empire	Producer
2003	The Haunted Mansion	Producer
2004	Home on the Range	Special Thanks
2004	Lorenzo (Short)	Executive Producer
2004	One by One (Video short)	Producer
2006	The Little Matchgirl (Short)	Producer
2007	Meet the Robinsons	Special Thanks: Executive Team
2007	Earth (Documentary)	Executive Producer
2008	Bolt	Special Thanks
2009	Waking Sleeping Beauty (Documentary)	Director / Producer / Narrator
2010	Oceans (Documentary)	Executive Producer
2010	Hand Held (Documentary)	Producer / Director
2011	African Cats (Documentary)	Executive Producer
2012	Chimpanzee (Documentary)	Executive Producer / Writer
2012	High Ground (Documentary)	Producer / Writer
2012	Frankenweenie	Executive Producer
2014	Maleficent	Executive Producer
2017	Beauty and the Beast	Executive Producer
2018	Howard	Writer/Director
2019	Wonder Park	Executive Producer
2019	The Lion King	Special Thanks
2023	The Inventor	Executive Producer
2024	Not Just a Goof (Documentary)	Executive Producer

== Awards and nominations ==
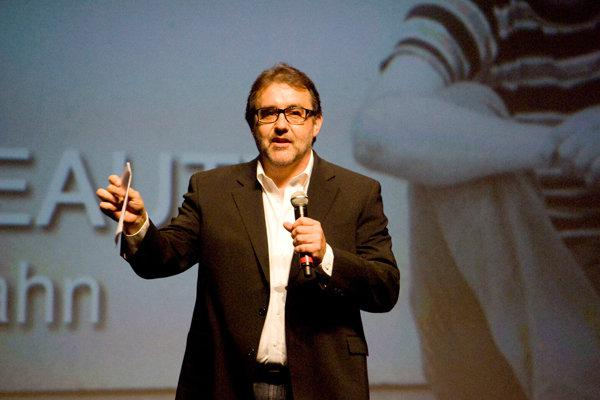
Hahn at the Deauville Film Festival 2009

Academy Awards

- 1991 – Nominated Best Picture – Beauty and the Beast
- 2006 – Nominated Best Animated Short Film – The Little Match Girl

Golden Globe Awards

- 1991 Winner Best Picture Musical or Comedy – Beauty and the Beast
- 1994 Winner Best Picture Musical or Comedy – The Lion King

National Board of Review Awards

- 1991 Best Animated Film Beauty and the Beast

ASIFA Hollywood Annie Awards

- 1991 Winner Best Animated Feature – Beauty and the Beast
- 1994 Winner Best Animated Feature – The Lion King
- 2011 Winner Special Award – Waking Sleeping Beauty
- 2011 ASIFA Honorary Fellowship Of The Year in recognition of a significant and benevolent or charitable impact on the art and industry of animation.

California State University Northridge

- 2011 Honorary Alumni of the Year

St. Xavier University

- 2011 Honorary Doctorate

Laguna College of Art and Design

- 2012 Honorary Doctor of Fine Arts

Chapman University

- 2017 Honorary Doctor of Fine Arts

Disney Legends

- 2022 honoree

== See also ==
- Walt Disney (2015)
- Collage film
