= Wizards (film) =

1977 film by Ralph Bakshi

- Theatrical release poster
- Directed by: Ralph Bakshi
- Written by: Ralph Bakshi
- Produced by: Ralph Bakshi
- Starring: Bob Holt; Jesse Welles; Richard Romanus; David Proval; Steve Gravers; Mark Hamill
- Narrated by: Susan Tyrrell
- Cinematography: Ted C. Bemiller
- Edited by: Donald W. Ernst
- Music by: Andrew Belling
- Production company: Bakshi Productions
- Distributed by: 20th Century-Fox
- Release date: February 9, 1977
- Running time: 81 minutes
- Country: United States
- Language: English
- Budget: $2 million
- Box office: $9 million

Wizards is a 1977 American animated epic fantasy film written, directed and produced by Ralph Bakshi and distributed by 20th Century-Fox. The film follows a battle between two wizards of opposing powers, one representing the forces of magic and the other representing the forces of technology.

The film is notable for being the first fantasy film by Bakshi, a filmmaker who was previously known only for "urban films" such as Fritz the Cat (1972), Heavy Traffic (1973) and Coonskin (1975), and who later made the animated version of The Lord of the Rings (1978). The film received mixed reviews from critics, but grossed US$9 million theatrically with a $2 million budget.

== Plot ==
Earth has been devastated by a nuclear war. It takes 10 million years for the radioactive clouds to allow sunlight in. The humans who survived the apocalypse have been transformed into mutants, while humanity's true ancestors – trolls, fairies, elves and dwarves – resurface and live in the idyllic land of Montagar.

While her people celebrate 3,000 years of peace, Delia, queen of the fairies, falls into a trance and gives birth to twin wizards: the kindhearted Avatar and his evil, mutated brother Blackwolf. After Delia's death years later, Blackwolf attempts to usurp her leadership, but Avatar defeats him in a magical duel. Blackwolf leaves Montagar, vowing to return and "make this a planet where mutants rule", angered that his mutant people will only produce further mutant offspring and that they have been relegated to living only in the radioactive regions instead of "the good lands" (non-radioactive zones).

Three thousand years later, Blackwolf leads the dark land of Scortch, where he and his army of mutants and other evil creatures salvage and restore ancient technology. He tries to attack Montagar twice, but is foiled when his mutant warriors become bored or sidetracked during battle. Blackwolf discovers an old projector and reels of Nazi propaganda footage from World War II, using his magic to enhance it for psychological warfare: inspiring his own soldiers while horrifying enemy troops into submission.

Peace, Avatar, Weehawk and Elinore

Meanwhile in Montagar, Avatar is training the President's daughter, Elinore, to become a full-fledged fairy. The President is assassinated by Necron 99, a robot sent by Blackwolf to eliminate all believers in magic. Avatar manages to subdue the robot and reprograms it for nonviolence, renaming it Peace in the hope that it will bring harmony. Through the robot, Avatar discovers that the "dream machine"—a projector—is Blackwolf's secret weapon. Avatar, Elinore, Peace, and the elf warrior Weehawk set out to destroy the projector and save the world from another nuclear holocaust.

In a forest inhabited by fairies, the group's leader, Sean, confronts them. Weehawk realizes that Peace is missing when an unseen assassin kills Sean. In retaliation, the fairies kidnap Elinore. Avatar and Weehawk set out to search for her in the forbidden Fairy Sanctuary. Weehawk falls into a chasm and insists that Avatar leave him behind to find Elinore. Avatar discovers Elinore, who is being guarded by fairies and small, human-like creatures that are about to execute her. He attempts to explain that they did not kill Sean, but the fairies do not believe him and shoot him with an arrow. Wounded in the shoulder, Avatar refuses to fight back, which impresses the Fairy King. Instead of executing them, he teleports Avatar and Elinore to a snowy mountaintop. Avatar and Elinore resume their journey, but soon realize they are wandering in circles. Peace and Weehawk (whom Peace saved from a vicious monster in the chasm) find Avatar and Elinore. Together, they find their way out of the mountains.

Avatar and the others come across an encamped army led by an elf general who is preparing to launch an attack on Scortch the following day. However, that night, Blackwolf initiates a surprise attack. During the chaos, Elinore and Peace find themselves under attack by one of Blackwolf's demons, but Avatar manages to dispatch it. As one of Blackwolf's battle tanks arrives to bombard the camp, Elinore unexpectedly kills Peace and climbs into the tank as it drives away.

The next day, Avatar and Weehawk enter Scortch by ship and make for Blackwolf's castle, while the General leads his elf warriors in a bloody battle to distract Blackwolf's forces. The pair split up. Weehawk tracks Elinore, and Avatar goes after Blackwolf. Weehawk nearly kills Elinore before she explains that Blackwolf took control of her mind when she touched Peace. Blackwolf declares his magic superior to Avatar's and demands Avatar’s surrender. Avatar admits that he has not practiced magic for some time, but offers to show Blackwolf a trick that their mother taught him; Avatar pulls a pistol from his sleeve and shoots Blackwolf dead. Weehawk destroys the projector, leaving the mutants helpless as the General's army defeats them. With Montagar's safety secured, Weehawk returns home as its new ruler, while Avatar and Elinore decide to start their own kingdom elsewhere.

== Cast ==
- Bob Holt as Avatar, an old but powerful wizard.
- Jesse Welles as Elinore, a fiery fairy and Avatar's love interest.
- Richard Romanus as Weehawk, an elf warrior.
- David Proval as Necron 99/Peace, Blackwolf's former minion. He is renamed Peace by Avatar.
- Steve Gravers as Blackwolf, Avatar's evil twin brother and main antagonist of the film.
- James Connell as President, the leader and Elinore’s father.
- Mark Hamill as Sean, son of the king of the mountain fairies and captain of the guards. This is his film debut, made at around the same time that George Lucas cast him in Star Wars as Luke Skywalker.
- Christopher Tayback as Peewhitle, Young Elf Soldier
- Angelo Grisanti as Larry, Blackwolf's Frog Sidekick.
- Susan Tyrrell as The Narrator/Blackwolf's Wife/Mountain Fairy (uncredited).
- Ralph Bakshi as Fritz/Lardbottom/Stormtrooper (uncredited).
- Phil Seuling as Hawk, The Stormtrooper (uncredited)
- Charles Gordone as Alfie, Elf Soldier (uncredited).

== Production ==
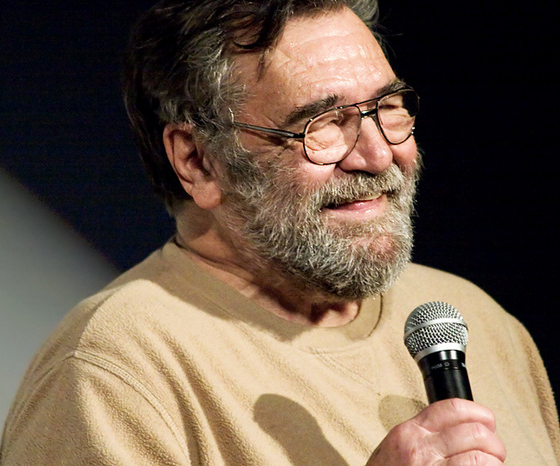
Ralph Bakshi in January 2009

Ralph Bakshi had long had an interest in fantasy. Bakshi had been drawing fantasy artwork as far back as 1955, while he was still in high school. Wizards originated in the concept for Tee-Witt, an unproduced television series Bakshi developed and pitched to CBS in 1967. In 1976, Bakshi pitched War Wizards, which he wrote in only two weeks, to 20th Century-Fox, returning to the fantasy drawings he had created in high school for inspiration. Bakshi sought to depart from his more urban-oriented films that deal with topics of sex and drugs but still have a similar impact.

The film is an allegorical comment on the moral ambiguity of technology and the potentially destructive powers of propaganda. Blackwolf's secret weapon is propaganda, used to incite his legions and terrorize the fairy folk of Montagar; but Avatar's willingness to use a technological tool (a handgun pulled from "up his sleeve") destroys his evil twin. Bakshi also states that Wizards "was about the creation of the state of Israel and the Holocaust, about the Jews looking for a homeland, and about the fact that fascism was on the rise again".

British illustrator Ian Miller and comic book artist Mike Ploog were hired to contribute backgrounds and designs. The crew included Vita, Turek, Sparey, Vitello and Spence, who had become comfortable with Bakshi's limited storyboarding and lack of pencil tests. Artist Alex Niño signed a contract with Bakshi to work on the film, and was granted a work visa, but was unable to gain permission from the Philippine government to leave for the United States until two months afterward, and later found that by the time he had arrived in the United States, not only had the film's animation been completed, but Niño's visa did not allow him to submit freelance work on any other projects.

The film's main cast includes Bob Holt, Jesse Welles, Richard Romanus, David Proval, and Steve Gravers. Bakshi cast Holt based on his ability to imitate the voice of actor Peter Falk, of whom Bakshi is a fan. Welles, Romanus and Proval again worked with Bakshi on Hey Good Lookin', where Romanus and Proval provided the voices of Vinnie and Crazy Shapiro, respectively. Actress Tina Bowman, who plays a small role in Wizards, has a larger role in Hey Good Lookin'. Actor Mark Hamill auditioned for and received a voice role in the film. Bakshi states that "He needed a job, and he came to me, and I thought he was great, and [George] Lucas thought he should do it, and he got not only Wizards, he got Star Wars." Bakshi had wanted a female narrator for his film, and he loved Susan Tyrrell's acting. Tyrrell performed the narration for the film, but requested her name be left off the film credits. Years later, Tyrrell told Bakshi that she got most of her later work from her narration on the film, and that she wished she had allowed him to put her name on it.

John Grant writes in his book Masters of Animation that "[the] overall affect of the animation is akin to that of the great anime creators – one has to keep reminding oneself that Wizards predates Miyazaki's The Castle of Cagliostro (1979), not the other way round. [...] The backgrounds [...] are especially lovely, even the simplest of them; and in general the movie has a strong visual brio despite occasional technical hurriedness." Notable artists involved in the production of Wizards include Ian Miller, who produced the gloomy backgrounds of Scortch, and Mike Ploog, who contributed likewise for the more arcadian landscapes of Montagar.

Bakshi was unable to complete the battle sequences with the budget Fox had given him. When he asked them for a budget increase, they refused (during the same meeting, director George Lucas had asked for a budget increase for Star Wars and was also refused). As a result, Bakshi finished his film by paying out of his own pocket and using rotoscoping for the unfinished battle sequences. According to Bakshi, "I thought that if we dropped all the detail, it would look very artistic, and very beautiful, and I felt, why bother animating all of this? I'm looking for a way to get realism into my film and get real emotion." In his audio commentary for the film's DVD release, Bakshi states that "There's no question that it was an easier way to get these gigantic scenes that I wanted. It also was the way that showed me how to do Lord of the Rings, so it worked two ways." In addition to stock footage, the film used battle sequences from films such as Zulu, El Cid, Battle of the Bulge and Alexander Nevsky for rotoscoping. Live-action sequences from Patton were also featured.

Vaughn Bode's work has been credited as an influence on Wizards. Quentin Tarantino describes Avatar as "a cross between Tolkien's Hobbit, Mel Brooks' 2000 Year Old Man, and Marvel Comics' Howard the Duck" and Blackwolf as physically similar to Sergei Eisenstein's Ivan the Terrible. In Jerry Beck's Animated Movie Guide, Andrew Leal writes that "The central figure, Avatar [...] sounds a great deal like Peter Falk, and clearly owes much to cartoonist Vaughn Bodé's Cheech Wizard character."

As War Wizards neared completion, Lucas requested that Bakshi change the title of his film to Wizards in order to avoid conflict with Star Wars, and Bakshi agreed because Lucas had allowed Mark Hamill to take time off from Star Wars in order to record a voice for Wizards.

== Release and reception ==
Although Wizards received a limited release, it was commercially successful and developed a worldwide audience. According to Bakshi, he was once interviewed by a German reporter who was unsure as to why the Nazi swastika was used to represent war. Bakshi said "I didn't get any criticism. People pretty much loved Wizards."

On the review aggregator website Rotten Tomatoes, the film has a 68% approval rating based on 28 reviews, with an average rating of 6/10. The website's critical consensus reads, "Its central metaphor is a bit too on the nose, but Wizards is an otherwise psychedelic, freaky trip into an alternate version of our world."

A. H. Weiler of The New York Times writes that the film "evolves, at best, as only a mildly interesting mixture of clashing polemics and shoot-'em-up melodrama" that "merely restates the already too obvious, dire results of nuclear war and man's inhumanity to man". Arthur D. Murphy of Variety panned the film as "a confusing melange of melodrama, allegory and limp polemic. The animation technique is excellent in a professional sense, but neither story nor music ever really gets interesting." Gene Siskel gave the film two-and-a-half stars out of four and wrote that "Ralph Bakshi's Wizards, although good-looking, isn't magical enough. Although it's a futuristic fairy-tale, it frequently interrupts its narrative with contemporary jokes. The jokes remind us we're watching a movie while calling into question the sincerity of the film itself." Charles Champlin of the Los Angeles Times was generally positive, writing: "Whatever else it is, 'Wizards' is a feast for the eyes, a nonstop succession of imaginings and imageries that are beautiful, startling funny, powerfully ominous, classically cartoonish, visions of heaven and hellfire ... It is hypnotically interesting for those who are addicted to animation but hardly less so to those who are plenty satisfied with Tom and Jerry." Gary Arnold of The Washington Post found the film a "dim animated novelty" that was "conspicuously lacking in narrative momentum. Even when the graphics and draughtsmanship seem clever, they embellish the most negligible of scenarios." Richard Combs of The Monthly Film Bulletin wrote, "What emerges from this mish-mash of material is a predictable confusion of sentiment and cynicism: Bakshi seems uncertain whether to try for the full other-worldly magic of Tolkien or to treat the whole thing as camp (the tone of the flower-child fairy-tale narrator strongly suggests the latter)."

Ken Whitman's company Whit Publications published the tabletop role-playing game Ralph Bakshi's Wizards in 1992.

20th Century Fox Home Entertainment responded to an online petition created by Animation on DVD.com and written by Keith Finch demanding the film's release on DVD. (Note: All three sources here presumably trace back to Bakshi.) The disc, released on May 25, 2004, featured an audio commentary track by Bakshi and the interview segment Ralph Bakshi: The Wizard of Animation. Bakshi has stated that Wizards was always intended as a trilogy. One of the sequels was pitched to Fox, who did not greenlight the project.

20th Century Fox released a Special Edition Blu-ray Disc of the film on March 13, 2012, to commemorate the film's 35th anniversary. The disc includes the special features from the DVD, along with a 24-page book including rare artwork from the film and an introduction from Bakshi.

== Possible sequel ==
Bakshi mentioned he had plans for a sequel entitled Wizards 2 that involved the relationship between Avatar and Elinore. Bakshi said the plot would be "where [their relationship] doesn't work out, and Weehawk gets in the way." The sequel was never developed due to production difficulties and the other projects on which Bakshi was then focused.

In late 2004, a Wizards II graphic novel went into production, produced by Bakshi. The stories were to be from the Wizards "universe" and each story would be created by a different artist. In September 2008, it was announced that Main Street Pictures would collaborate with Bakshi on a sequel to Wizards.

In 2015, Bakshi stated that he had a script finished and hoped to have it be his next film. In a November interview, while promoting Last Days of Coney Island, Bakshi stated that Wizards 2 is about "madness, absolute madness!"

== See also ==
- List of 20th Century Fox theatrical animated features
- Sword and planet
- Sword and sorcery
- Peace on Earth (1939 Hugh Harman short animated film with post-apocalyptic theme and rotoscoped images of violent warfare)
