= Hey Good Lookin' =

Hey Good Lookin' may refer to:

- "Hey, Good Lookin'", a Cole Porter song from Something for the Boys (1943)
- "Hey, Good Lookin'" (song), a 1951 song by Hank Williams
- Hey! Good Lookin' (album), a 1965 album by Bo Diddley
- Hey Good Lookin' (film), a 1982 film by Ralph Bakshi
  - Hey Good Lookin' (soundtrack), the soundtrack to the film
