= Ralph Bakshi's Wizards =

- Publisher: Whit Publications
- Publication date: 1992

Ralph Bakshi's Wizards is a 1992 role-playing game published by Whit Publications and adapted from the 1977 film of the same name, directed by Ralph Bakshi.

== Gameplay ==
Ralph Bakshi's Wizards is a game in which the setting is a post-holocaust world of technology and magic.

== Publication history ==
Shannon Appelcline noted that after Ken Whitman published the role-playing game Mutazoids through his company Whit Productions, "He followed that up with a second company, Whit Publications, and two licensed games: Edward Bolme's Ralph Bakshi's Wizards (1992) and David Clark's WWF Basic Adventure Game (1993)."

The Wizards Character Sheets were released in 1992, and the Montagar supplement was published in 1993.

== Reception ==
Christopher Earley reviewed Wizards in White Wolf #35 (March/April, 1993), rating it a 4 out of 5 and stated that "All in all, this product should interest the initiated and uninitiated alike. One only wonders how many variations on the theme exist, and whether a Wizards campaign can enjoy long-term success."

== Reviews ==
- Dragon #196 (Aug., 1993)
- Shadis #10
