= Fantasia 2000 =

1999 animated Disney film

- Theatrical release poster
- Directed by: Don Hahn; Pixote Hunt; Hendel Butoy; Eric Goldberg; James Algar; Francis Glebas; Paul and Gaëtan Brizzi
- Produced by: Roy E. Disney; Donald W. Ernst
- Starring: James Levine; Steve Martin; Itzhak Perlman; Quincy Jones; Bette Midler; James Earl Jones; Penn & Teller; Angela Lansbury
- Cinematography: Tim Suhrstedt
- Edited by: Jessica Ambinder-Rojas; Lois Freeman-Fox
- Production company: Walt Disney Feature Animation
- Distributed by: Buena Vista Pictures Distribution (Note: Distributed by Buena Vista Pictures Distribution through the Walt Disney Pictures banner.)
- Release dates: December 17, 1999 (Carnegie Hall); January 1, 2000 (IMAX); June 16, 2000 (United States)
- Running time: 75 minutes
- Country: United States
- Language: English
- Budget: $80–85 million
- Box office: $90.9 million

Fantasia 2000 is a 1999 American animated musical anthology film produced by Walt Disney Feature Animation and the sequel to Fantasia (1940). Like its predecessor, the film consists of animated segments set to pieces of classical music. Segments are introduced by Steve Martin, Itzhak Perlman, Quincy Jones, Bette Midler, James Earl Jones, Penn & Teller, James Levine, and Angela Lansbury in live action scenes directed by Don Hahn, while the animated sequences are directed by Pixote Hunt, Hendel Butoy, Eric Goldberg, James Algar, Francis Glebas and Paul and Gaëtan Brizzi.

After numerous unsuccessful attempts to develop a Fantasia sequel, The Walt Disney Company revived the idea shortly after Michael Eisner became chief executive officer in 1984. Development paused until the commercial success of the 1991 home video release of Fantasia convinced Eisner that there was enough public interest and funds for a sequel, to which he assigned Disney as executive producer. The music for six of the film's eight segments is performed by the Chicago Symphony Orchestra conducted by James Levine. The film includes The Sorcerer's Apprentice from the 1940 original. Each new segment was produced by combining traditional animation with computer-generated imagery. Fantasia 2000 is part of the Disney Renaissance, and also commemorates Walt Disney's third animated feature film.

Fantasia 2000 premiered on December 17, 1999, at Carnegie Hall in New York City as part of a concert tour that also visited London, Paris, Tokyo, and Pasadena, California. The film was then released in 75 IMAX theaters worldwide from January 1 to April 30, 2000, marking the first major Hollywood motion picture to be released in IMAX and also the first feature-length animated film to be released in the format. Its general release in regular theaters followed on June 16, 2000. The film received mostly positive reviews from critics, who praised several of its sequences, while also deeming its overall quality uneven in comparison to its predecessor. Budgeted at about $80–$85 million, the film only grossed $90.9 million worldwide, making it a box-office bomb.

== Program ==
The film begins with the sound of an orchestra tuning and Deems Taylor's introduction from Fantasia. Panels showing various segments from Fantasia fly in outer space and form the set and stage for an orchestra. Musicians take their seats and tune up as animators and artists draw at their desks before James Levine approaches the conductor's podium and signals the beginning of the first piece.

1. Symphony No. 5 by Ludwig van Beethoven. A colorful flock of butterfly-like creatures, pairs of fluttering triangular wings, is attacked by black polygonal creatures that resemble bats. The world is thrown into darkness, but light and color ultimately prevail.
2. Pines of Rome by Ottorino Respighi. A family of humpback whales are able to fly. The calf is separated from his parents and becomes trapped in an iceberg after chased by a flock of angry seagulls. Eventually, he finds his way out with his mother's help. The family join a larger pod of whales, who fly and frolic through the clouds to emerge into outer space. Introduced by Steve Martin, who gives a brief history on Fantasia's original purpose, after which Itzhak Perlman introduces the segment proper.
3. Rhapsody in Blue by George Gershwin. Set in New York City in the 1930s, and designed in the style of Al Hirschfeld's known caricatures of the time, the story follows four individuals who wish for a better life. Duke is a construction worker who dreams of becoming a jazz drummer; Joe is a down-on-his-luck unemployed man who wishes he could get a job; Rachel is a little girl who wants to spend time with her busy parents instead of being shuttled around by her governess; and John is a married rich husband who longs for a simpler, more fun life. The segment ends with all four getting their wish, though their stories interact with each other's without any of them knowing. Introduced by Quincy Jones with pianist Ralph Grierson.
4. Piano Concerto No. 2, Allegro, Opus 102 by Dmitri Shostakovich. Based on the fairy tale "The Steadfast Tin Soldier" by Hans Christian Andersen, a broken toy soldier with one leg falls in love with a toy ballerina and protects her from an evil jack-in-the-box. Unlike the original story, this version has a happy ending. Introduced by Bette Midler featuring pianist Yefim Bronfman.
5. The Carnival of the Animals (Le Carnaval des Animaux), Finale by Camille Saint-Saëns. A flock of flamingoes tries to force a slapstick member, who enjoys playing with a yo-yo, to engage in the flock's "dull" routines. Introduced by James Earl Jones with animator Eric Goldberg.
6. The Sorcerer's Apprentice (Reprise) by Paul Dukas. Based on the 1797 poem "Der Zauberlehrling" by Goethe, the segment is the only one featured in both Fantasia and Fantasia 2000. It tells the story of Mickey Mouse, an apprentice of sorcerer Yen Sid who attempts some of his master's magic tricks before knowing how to control them. Introduced by Penn & Teller rather than using an archived recording of Deems Taylor introducing the segment as in the original film. The scene where Mickey shakes hands with Levine's predecessor Leopold Stokowski is like that in the original film but Mickey is now voiced by Wayne Allwine instead of Walt Disney. This outro leads directly to the intro for Pomp and Circumstance, with Donald Duck and Daisy Duck voiced by Tony Anselmo and Russi Taylor, respectively.
7. Pomp & Circumstance – Marches 1, 2, 3 and 4 by Sir Edward Elgar. Based on the story of Noah's Ark from the Book of Genesis, Donald Duck is Noah's assistant and Daisy Duck is Donald's loving partner. Donald is given the task of gathering the animals to the Ark, and misses, loses, and reunites with Daisy in the process. Introduced by James Levine.
8. Firebird Suite—1919 Version by Igor Stravinsky. A sprite is awoken by her companion, an elk, and accidentally wakes a fiery spirit of destruction in a nearby volcano who destroys the forest and seemingly the sprite. The sprite survives and the elk encourages her to restore the forest to its normal state. Introduced by Angela Lansbury.

== Production ==
=== Development ===
Fantasia is timeless. It may run 10, 20 or 30 years. It may run after I'm gone. Fantasia is an idea in itself. I can never build another Fantasia. I can improve. I can elaborate. That's all.

— Walt Disney

In 1940, Walt Disney released Fantasia, his third animated feature film, consisting of eight animated segments set to pieces of classical music. Initially he planned to have the film on continual release with new segments replacing older ones so audiences would never see the same film twice. The idea was dropped following the film's initial low box office receipts and a mixed response from critics. Following preliminary work on new segments, the idea was shelved by 1942 and was not revisited for the remainder of Disney's life.

In 1980, animators Wolfgang Reitherman and Mel Shaw started preliminary work on Musicana, a feature film "mixing jazz, classical music, myths, modern art ... following the old Fantasia format" that was to present "ethnic tales from around the world with the music of the various countries". The project was cancelled in favor of Mickey's Christmas Carol (1983).

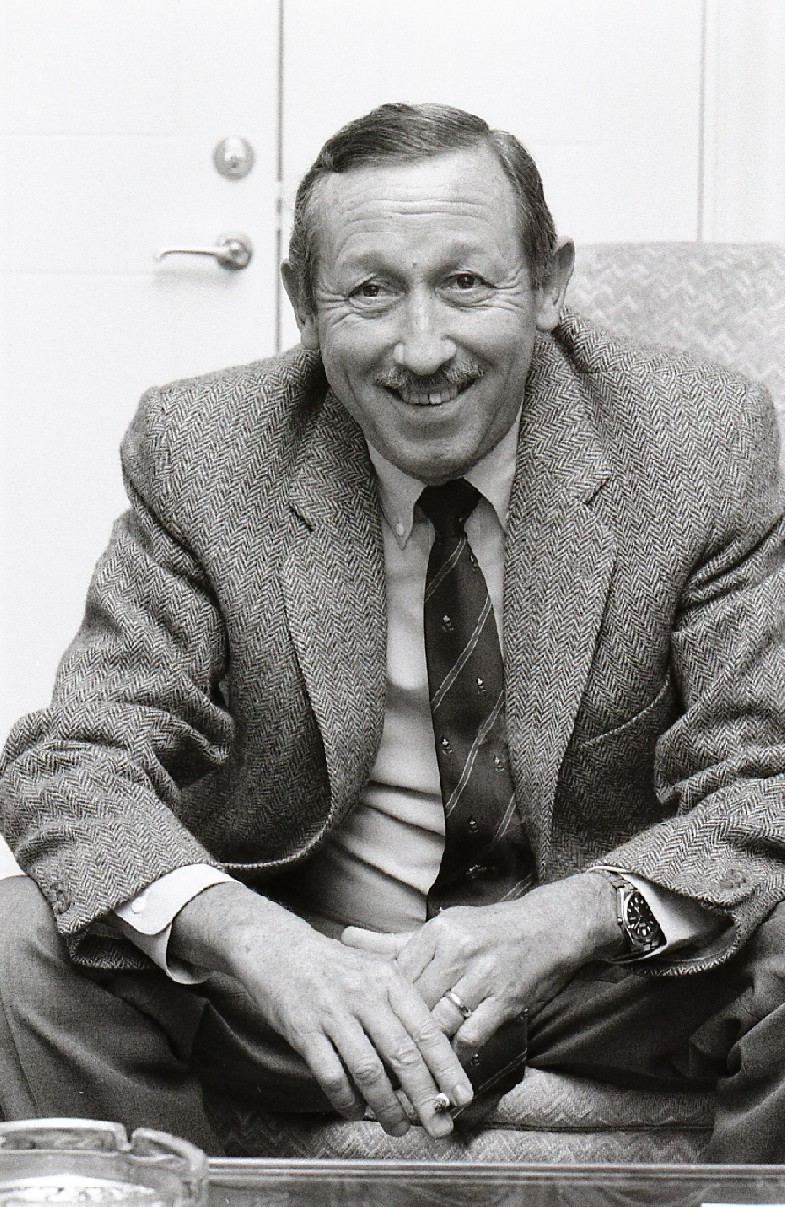
Roy E. Disney had pitched the idea of a sequel to Fantasia.

The idea of a Fantasia sequel was revived shortly after Michael Eisner became chief executive officer of The Walt Disney Company in 1984, when Walt's nephew, vice chairman Roy E. Disney, suggested it to him at a lunch. The idea had first entered Disney's mind ten years earlier, and he recalled Eisner's reaction: "It was as if a big light bulb went on over his head. The idea was enticing, but we didn't have the resources to carry it out". However, Walt Disney Studios chairman Jeffrey Katzenberg showed a lack of interest in the film. He had once asked André Previn to work on a Fantasia film but Previn declined after he learned it was to feature songs by the Beatles rather than classical music. Eisner approached Leonard Bernstein with the same idea, but while he seemed enthusiastic, Bernstein died before production began. It took a further seven years before the film was reconsidered, after the 1990 reissue of Fantasia grossed $25 million domestically and the announcement of its limited availability on home video in 1991 prompted 9.25 million pre-orders. Disney saw its commercial success as a sign that there was enough public interest in the Fantasia franchise to make a sequel. Eisner finally gave the green-light to the film in 1991, and had Disney serve as executive producer on the basis that its production was funded by the proceeds from the video sales. Disney assigned Donald W. Ernst as producer and Hendel Butoy as supervisory director, having liked his work on The Rescuers Down Under (1990).

During the search for a suitable conductor, Disney and Walt Disney Feature Animation president Thomas Schumacher invited Metropolitan Opera conductor James Levine and manager Peter Gelb to a meeting in September 1991. Disney recalled: "I asked James what his thought was on a three minute version of Beethoven's fifth symphony. He paused and went 'I think the right three minutes would be beautiful'". In November 1992, Disney, Schumacher, Levine, Gelb, and Butoy met in Vienna to discuss a collection of story reels developed, one of them being Pines of Rome, which Levine took an immediate liking to. Butoy described Levine's enthusiasm toward the film as "like a kid in a candy store". Because Katzenberg continued to express some hostility towards the film, Disney held development meetings without him and reported directly to Eisner instead, something that author James B. Stewart wrote "would have been unthinkable on any other future animation project."

Production began under the working title of Fantasia Continued with a release in 1997. The title was changed to Fantasia 1999, followed by Fantasia 2000 to coincide with its theatrical release in 2000. Disney formed its initial running order with half of the Fantasia program and only "three or four new numbers" with the aim of releasing a "semi-new movie". Realizing the idea would not work, he kept three Fantasia segments—The Sorcerer's Apprentice, The Nutcracker Suite, and Dance of the Hours—in the program for "quite a while". Night on Bald Mountain was the most difficult segment for him to remove from his original running order because it was one of his favorites. He had placed it in the middle of the film without Ave Maria, but felt it did not work and scrapped the idea. Later on, Dance of the Hours was dropped and The Nutcracker Suite was replaced by Rhapsody in Blue during the last few months of production following the response from numerous test screenings. Disney kept The Sorcerer's Apprentice in the final program as a homage to Fantasia. The segment underwent digital restoration by Cinesite in Los Angeles. Disney considered using Clair de Lune, a piece originally made for Fantasia that followed two great white herons flying through the Everglades at night, but thought it was "pretty boring". An idea to have "a nightmare and a dream struggling for a sleeping child's soul" to Rhapsody on a Theme of Paganini by Sergei Rachmaninoff was fully storyboarded, but fell through.

=== Segments ===
==== Symphony No. 5 ====
Symphony No. 5 is an abstract segment created by Pixote Hunt with story development by Kelvin Yasuda. In December 1997, after rejecting pitches from four other animators, Disney and Ernst asked Hunt for his ideas. Hunt first thought of the story on a morning walk in Pasadena, California, one depicting a battle of "good" against "evil" and how the conflict resolves itself. It took Hunt approximately two years, from start to finish, to complete the segment. Disney and Ernst decided to go with Hunt's idea; Hunt avoided producing an entirely abstract work because "you can get something abstract on every computer screen" with ease. Hunt divided the segment into 31 mini-scenes, noting down points in which he would employ vivid color when the music was bright and fluid, and then switch to darker hues when the music felt darker and denser. To gain inspiration in how the shapes would move, Hunt and his associates visited San Diego Zoo, a butterfly farm, and observed slow motion footage of bats. The segment combines hand drawn backgrounds using pastels and paint that were scanned into the Computer Animation Production System (CAPS), and computer-generated imagery (CGI) of abstract shapes and effects, which were layered on top. Hunt explained that scanning each drawing "was a one-shot deal" as the platen that pressed onto it would alter the pastel once it had been scanned. At one point during production, Hunt and Yasuda completed 68 pastel drawings in eight days. The segment was produced using Houdini animation software.

==== Pines of Rome ====
Pines of Rome was the first piece Disney suggested for the film, as well as the first to be animated; designs appeared in the studio's dailies as early as October 1993. Butoy served as director with James Fujii handling the story. The opening to the piece gave Disney the idea of "something flying". Butoy sketched the sequence on yellow Post-it notes. The story originally involved the whales flying around from the perspective of a group of penguins, but the idea was scrapped to make the baby whale a central character. The whales were also set to return to Earth but Butoy said it "never felt quite right", leading to the decision to have them break through a cloud ceiling and enter a different world by the supernova. Butoy created a "musical intensity chart" for the animators to follow which "tracked the ups and downs of the music ... as the music brightens so does the color", and vice versa. He explained that because CGI was in its infancy during development, the first third of the segment was hand drawn using pencil to get a feel of how the whales would move. When the drawings were scanned into the CAPS system, Butoy found the whales were either moving too fast or had less weight to them. The drawings were altered to make the whales slow down and "more believable". The eyes of the whales were drawn by hand, as the desired looks and glances were not fully achievable using CGI. Butoy recalled the challenge of having the water appear and move as naturally as possible; the team decided to write computer code from scratch as traditional animation would have been too time-consuming and would have produced undesired results. The code handling the pod of whales was written so the whales would move away if they were to collide and not bump into, overlap, or go through each other. The same technique was used for the stampede scene in The Lion King (1994), which was produced at the same time.

==== Rhapsody in Blue ====
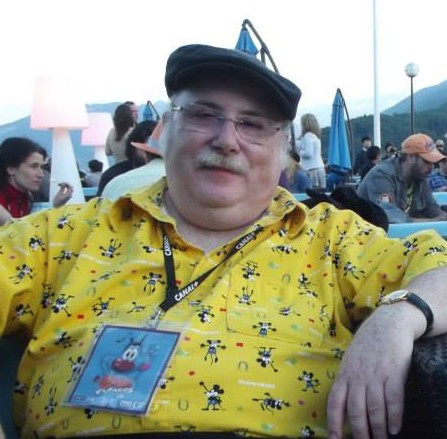
Eric Goldberg, director of Rhapsody in Blue and The Carnival of the Animals, Finale

Rhapsody in Blue is the first Fantasia segment with music from an American composer. It originated in 1995 when director and animator Eric Goldberg approached Al Hirschfeld about the idea of an animated short set to Gershwin's composition in the style of Hirschfeld's illustrations. In December 1998, Goldberg pitched Rhapsody in Blue to Thomas Schumacher and received the green-light to produce it, and Hirschfeld agreed to serve as artistic consultant and allowed the animators to adapt his works. Duke is named after jazz musician Duke Ellington. The bottom of his toothpaste tube reads "NINA", an Easter egg referencing Hirschfeld's daughter Nina, whose name Hirschfeld inscribed in several of his drawings since her birth in 1945. Another easter egg references artist Emily Jiuliano, whose name is shown as "E. Jiuliano". Rachel was designed after the Goldbergs' daughter; John, or "Flying John", is based on animation historian and author John Culhane and Hirschfeld's caricature of Alexander Woollcott. Goldberg took Hirschfeld's original illustration of Gershwin and animated it to make him play part of the "rhapsody" on the piano. The most difficult part of this particular scene to animate was the turning of Gershwin's head, as the original drawing depicted one angle of his head. The illustration also featured Ira Gershwin alongside his brother George, but Ira is not shown in the scene nor anywhere else in the film. Featured in the crowd emerging from the hotel are depictions of Brooks Atkinson and Hirschfeld, along with his wife Dolly Haas.

==== Piano Concerto No. 2 ====
Piano Concerto No. 2 was directed by Butoy with art director Michael Humphries. It originated in the 1930s when Walt Disney wished to adapt a collection of Hans Christian Andersen fairy tales into an animated film. The artists completed a series of preliminary designs based on the stories, including ones for "The Steadfast Tin Soldier" from 1938 by Bianca Majolie that were stored in the studio's animation research library and used for a 1991 Disney book that retold the story accompanied with the storyboard sketches. When Disney suggested using the Shostakovich piece, Butoy flipped through the book and found the story's structure fit to the music. When Humphries saw the sketches he designed the segment with works by Caravaggio and Rembrandt in mind to give the segment a "timeless" feel, while keeping the colors "as romantic as possible" during the scenes when the soldier and ballerina are first getting acquainted. Live-action footage of a ballerina was used as a guide for the toy ballerina's movements. Butoy found the Jack-in-a-box a difficult character to design and animate with its spring base and how he moved with the box. His appearance went through numerous changes, partly due to the lack of reference material available to the team.

The segment marked the first time the Disney studio created a film's main characters entirely from CGI; only backgrounds, secondary, or tertiary characters had been produced using CGI beforehand. Initially Butoy asked Pixar Animation Studios to handle the computer graphics, but CGI artist Steve Goldberg convinced him to let Disney's own team produce it. The backgrounds were completed by hand. Originally the drain sequence included friendly rats who performed comical gags, but the team found it did not fit the mood of the rest of the segment. The drains became a more scary environment, something that Butoy said was "what the music was telling us to do". Rain animation from Bambi (1942) was scanned into the CAPS system and digitally altered to fit into the segment. The ending was to feature the original ending with the soldier and ballerina melting in the fire, but the music was too upbeat to animate it and was changed. An excerpt of the segment was shown at the 1998 SIGGRAPH conference.

==== The Carnival of the Animals, Finale ====
The Carnival of the Animals, Finale was directed and animated by Goldberg; his wife Susan was its art director. The idea originated from animator Joe Grant, one of the two story directors on Fantasia who loved the ostriches in Dance of the Hours. When development for Fantasia 2000 began, Grant suggested the idea of having one of the ostriches play with a yo-yo to the last movement of The Carnival of the Animals. The ostriches were later changed to flamingos as Disney wished to avoid reintroducing characters from the original film and thought flamingos would look more colorful on the screen. Goldberg was partly inspired by co-director Mike Gabriel, who would play with a yo-yo as he took a break from working on Pocahontas (1995); Gabriel is given a credit for "yo-yo tricks" in the end credits. The segment was produced with CGI and 6,000 watercolor paintings on heavy bond paper. Susan chose a distinct colour palette for the segment which she compared to the style of a Hawaiian shirt. The Goldbergs and their team visited the zoo in Los Angeles and San Diego to study the anatomy and movement of flamingos.

==== Pomp and Circumstance (Land of Hope and Glory) ====
Mostly known as Britain's most loved patriotic song (thanks to its choral counterpart Land of Hope and Glory) the original march was created for royal and solemn events, but Eisner suggested his use as a stand-alone piece after he attended a graduation and thought its familiarity would be suitable for a Fantasia segment. His idea involved a selection of Disney princesses and heroes in a wedding procession carrying their future children who would then be presented in a ceremony. The animators' preliminary designs depicted a Greco-Roman setting; one of the staff members described the artwork as "an appalling abuse" of the characters. Eisner agreed to drop the story, but insisted that the music be used. After numerous ideas were scrapped due to the difficulty in writing a clear plot, animator and director Francis Glebas came up with the Noah's Ark idea that he titled Donald's Last Roundup!, later retitled as Noah's Duck, and pitched it thinking it was "laden with comic possibilities".

==== The Firebird ====
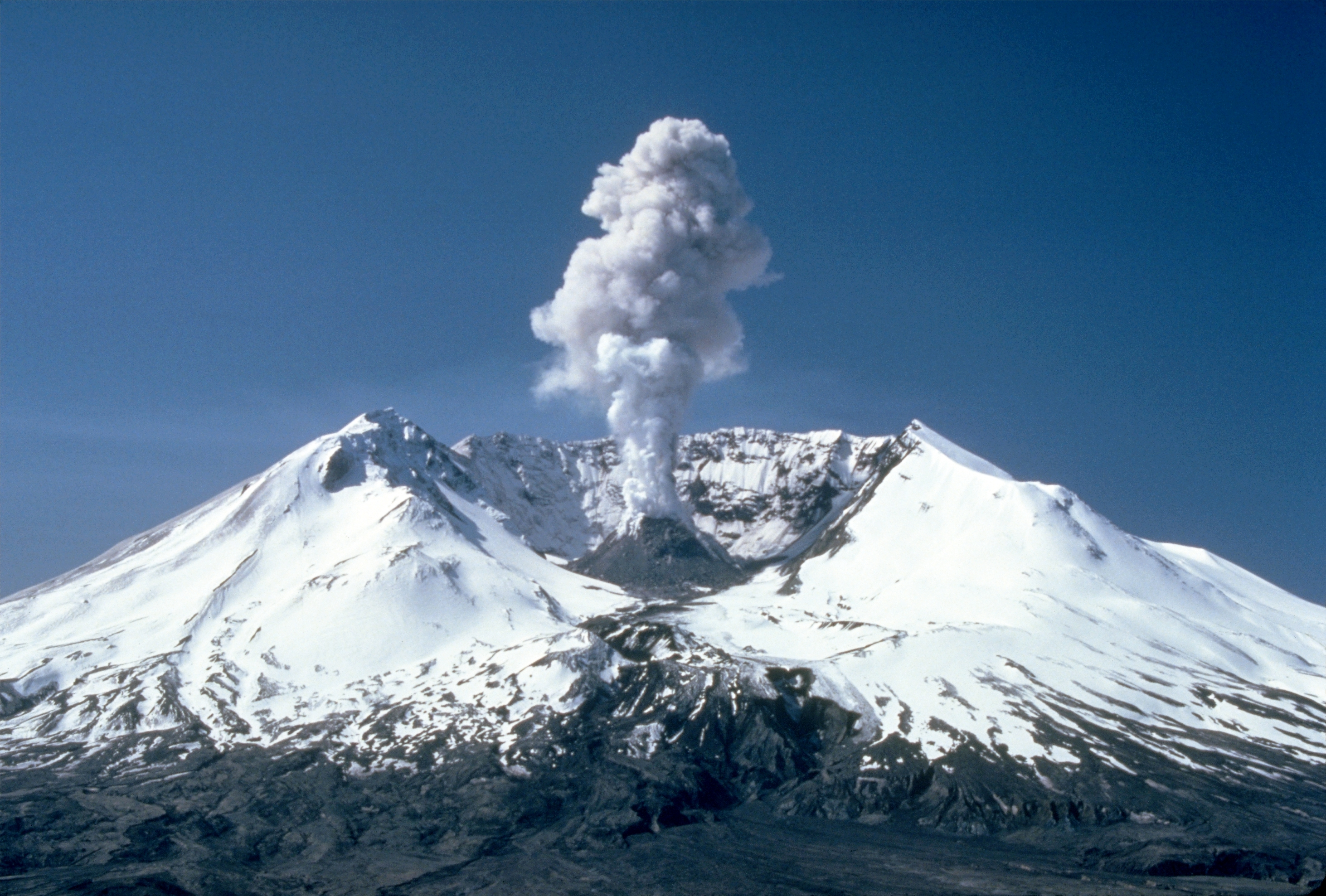
The Firebird was inspired by the 1980 eruption of Mount St. Helens.

To close the film, Disney wanted a piece that was "emotionally equivalent" to the Night on Bald Mountain and Ave Maria segments that closed Fantasia. Disney chose The Firebird as the piece to use after "half a dozen" others were scrapped, including Symphony No. 9 by Beethoven and the "Hallelujah Chorus" from Messiah by Handel. Disney thought of the idea of the Earth's destruction and renewal after passing Mount St. Helens following its eruption in 1980. French twins Paul and Gaëtan Brizzi from Disney's Paris studio were hired to direct the segment. The Sprite is a Dryad-like creature from Greek mythology. Her form changes six times; she is introduced as a Water Sprite who plants flowers as a Flower Sprite. She becomes a Neutral Sprite where her growth trail stops and an Ash Sprite when the forest has been destroyed. The segment ends with her as a Rain-Wave Sprite, followed by the Grass Sprite. The segment originally ended with the Sprite in the form of a flowing river that rises up into the sky and transforms into a Sun Sprite, but this was abandoned. The elk's antlers were produced by CGI and placed on top of its body that was drawn traditionally. The segment was produced using Houdini animation software.

=== Music ===
The music to The Sorcerer's Apprentice was already recorded on January 9, 1938, for the first film at Culver Studios, California with Leopold Stokowski conducting a group of session musicians. The recording of Rhapsody in Blue used in the film is an edited version of Ferde Grofé's orchestration of the piece performed by the Philharmonia Orchestra with conductor Bruce Broughton. The shortened version was made by cutting 125 bars of piano solo in three different places. A recording of James Levine conducting both pieces with the Philharmonia appears on the film's soundtrack.

The remaining six pieces were recorded at the Medinah Temple in Chicago, performed by the Chicago Symphony Orchestra conducted by Levine. Pines of Rome was re-arranged in 1993 by Bruce Coughlin, who reduced the four-movement piece by cutting the second movement and trimming sections of the third and fourth movements. The piece was recorded on March 28, 1994. The second recording involved Symphony No. 5, Carnival of the Animals, and Pomp and Circumstance, on April 25, 1994. Carnival of the Animals, Finale uses two pianos played by Gail Niwa and Philip Sabransky. Pomp and Circumstance was arranged by Peter Schickele and features the Chicago Symphony Chorus and soprano soloist Kathleen Battle. The next recording took place on April 24, 1995, for Piano Concerto No. 2 with pianist Yefim Bronfman. On September 28, 1996, The Firebird was the final piece to be recorded; its session lasted for three hours. The piece was arranged using four sections from Stravinsky's 1919 revision of the score.

=== Interstitials ===
Disney felt the need to keep interstitials (bridges) as used in Fantasia to give audiences a chance to "cleanse their emotional palate" from the previous segment while also providing some information about the next one. Don Hahn directed the live action scenes which were designed by Pixote Hunt. Hahn came up with the set and backgrounds while eating lunch; he proceeded to sketch a rough idea of what he imagined on a napkin. He "wanted to show images on shapes like big sails of a clipper ship. They fly in on the wind and form a sort of Stonehenge concert hall in the middle of a vast, empty, imaginary plain".

Hahn recalled some difficulty in finding someone to host the film, so the studio decided to use a group of artists and musicians from various fields of entertainment. The interstitials were filmed in various locations; the orchestra, Jones, Lansbury, and Bronfman were shot in Los Angeles, Perlman and Midler in New York City, and others in Boston, Massachusetts. Each scene was filmed in front of a green screen to allow shots of the orchestra or the set to be placed behind them. The shots of Levine, the artists, and the orchestra were filmed on October 31, 1998. The piano Grierson plays in his scene with Jones is the same one on which he played Rhapsody in Blue for the soundtrack.

== Release ==
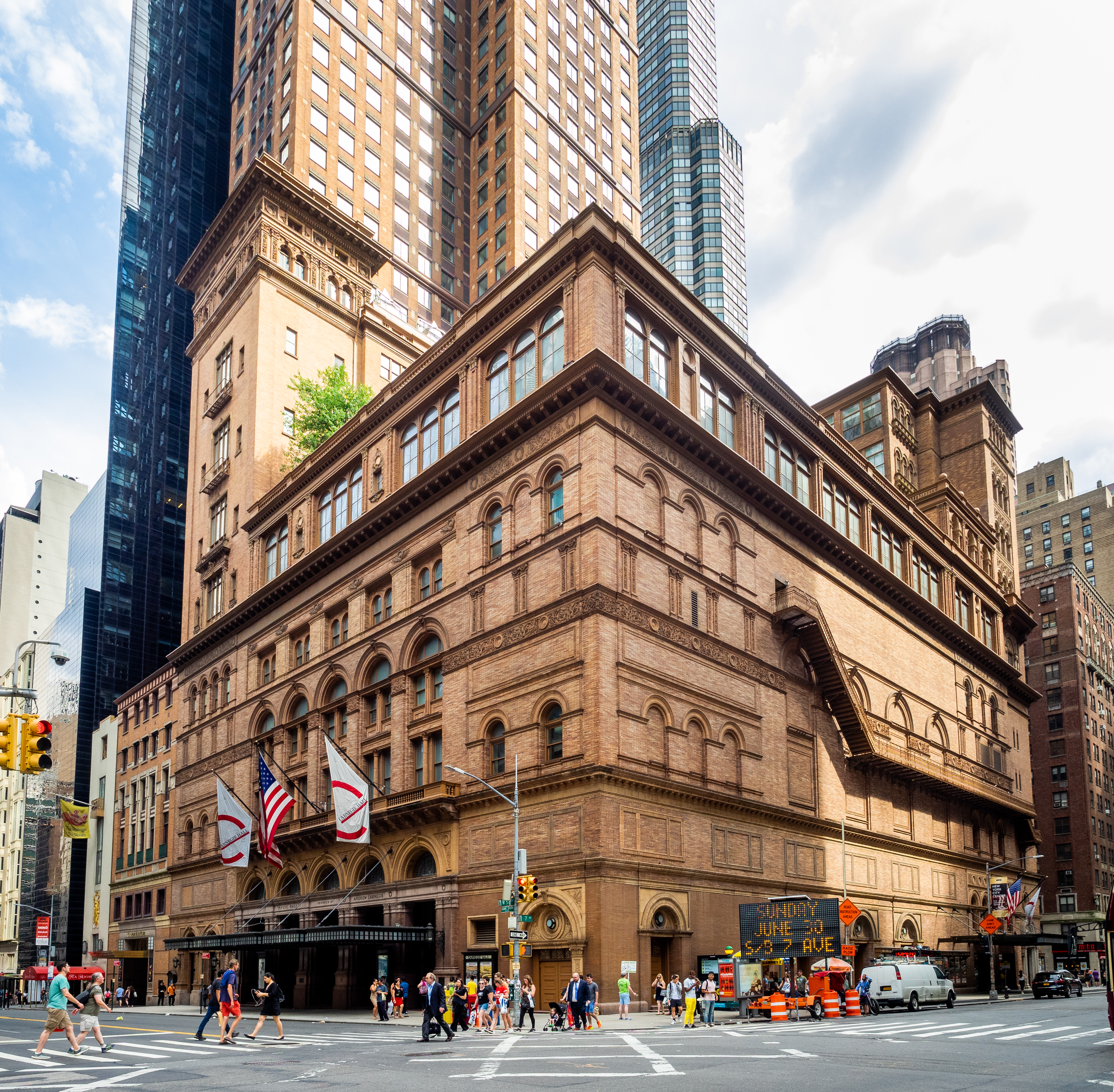
Fantasia 2000 had its premiere at Carnegie Hall in New York City.

Fantasia 2000 was officially announced on February 9, 1999, during a Disney presentation at the New Amsterdam Theater in New York City which featured a screening of The Carnival of the Animals. The film premiered at Carnegie Hall in New York City on December 17, 1999, for three nights as part of a five-city concert tour. The animation was presented on a screen above the stage while Levine conducted the Philharmonia Orchestra with a video auto-cue to time the music to the images. Performances followed at the Royal Albert Hall in London on December 21; the Théâtre des Champs-Élysées in Paris on December 22; the Orchard Hall in Tokyo on December 27; and the Pasadena Civic Auditorium in Pasadena, California on December 31, where Derrick Inouye conducted as part of a black tie $2,000-per-head New Year's Eve event. Each of the seven performances cost over $1 million.

=== Home media ===
Fantasia 2000 was first released on VHS and DVD on November 14, 2000, with both featuring a specially made introduction in which Roy gives a history of key innovations brought by various Disney productions (specifically Steamboat Willie, Flowers and Trees, Snow White and the Seven Dwarfs, Fantasia, The Great Mouse Detective, Beauty and the Beast, Toy Story 2 and Dinosaur). While it was available as a single-disc DVD, a three-disc set titled The Fantasia Anthology was released, including a digital copy of the film, a restored print of Fantasia to commemorate its 60th anniversary, and a third disc containing bonus features. The DVD releases of both films were also THX certified on this set.

On November 30, 2010, the film was issued for DVD and Blu-ray in a single and two-disc set with Fantasia and a four-disc DVD and Blu-ray combo pack. The Blu-ray transfer presents the film in 1080p high-definition video with DTS-HD Master Audio 7.1 surround sound. The film was withdrawn from release after its return to the "Disney Vault" moratorium on April 30, 2011.

The film, along with Fantasia and the 2018 compilation Celebrating Mickey (containing 13 Mickey Mouse shorts from Steamboat Willie to Get a Horse!), was reissued in 2021 as part of the U.S. Disney Movie Club exclusive The Best of Mickey Collection (Blu-ray/DVD/Digital). Both films were also broadly released for the first time in 2021 on multiple U.S. purchased streaming platforms, including Movies Anywhere and its retailers.

=== Soundtrack ===
Walt Disney Records released 60,000 copies of a limited edition of the film's soundtrack on November 30, 1999, in the United States and internationally under the Sony Classical label. With a running time of 60 minutes, the album features Levine conducting the Philharmonia Orchestra on Rhapsody in Blue and The Sorcerer's Apprentice at AIR Studios in London, and the Chicago Symphony Orchestra for the remaining six tracks using the recordings from the Medinah Temple. The soundtrack went on to reach the number one spot on the Billboard Top Classical Albums chart in July 2000. A Fantasia 2000 Deluxe Read-Along cassette and CD followed which contains two tracks telling the stories of Pomp and Circumstance and The Sorcerer's Apprentice, with narration by Pat Carroll. Included in the set is a 44-page book containing some of the film's artwork.

No.	Title	Length
1.	"Symphony No. 5 (Beethoven)"	2:51
2.	"Pines of Rome (Respighi)"	10:18
3.	"Rhapsody in Blue (Gershwin)"	12:32
4.	"Piano Concerto No. 2, Allegro, Opus 102 (Shostakovich)"	7:22
5.	"Carnival of the Animals (Le Carnaval des Animaux), Finale (Saint-Saëns)"	1:54
6.	"The Sorcerer's Apprentice (Dukas)"	9:33
7.	"Pomp and Circumstance, Marches No. 1, 2, 3, & 4 (Elgar)"	6:18
8.	"Firebird Suite — 1919 Version (Stravinsky)"	9:11
Total length:		59:59

== Reception ==
=== Box office ===
Fantasia 2000 first opened in IMAX theaters for a four-month run from January 1 to April 30, 2000, becoming the first animated feature-length film shown in the format. The idea to release it in IMAX first originated from Dick Cook during meetings the studio had about the best way to create "a sense of event" for the film. Roy Disney believed its uniqueness from typical feature films gave it a psychological advantage. A temporary 622-seat theatre costing almost $4 million was built in four weeks for its Los Angeles run as Disney was unable to reach an agreement to only have the film shown during the four months at the city's sole IMAX theater at the time at the California Science Center. Disney enforced the exclusive screening rule on the other IMAX cinemas that showed the film which limited its release. Each theater was decorated with a museum-like exhibit with educational material and large displays.

After opening at 75 theaters worldwide, the film grossed over $2.2 million in 54 cinemas in North America in its opening weekend, averaging $41,481 per theater, and $842,000 from 21 screens in 14 markets. It set new records for the highest gross for any IMAX engagement and surpassed the highest weekly total for any previously released IMAX film. Its three-day worldwide gross surpassed $3.8 million, setting further records at 18 venues worldwide. Fantasia 2000 grossed a worldwide total of $21.1 million in 30 days, and $64.5 million at the end of its IMAX run.

Following its release in 1,313 regular theaters in the United States on June 16, 2000, the film grossed an additional $2.8 million in its opening weekend that ranked eleventh at the box office. This followed nearly half a year of release in the IMAX format, possibly blunting the amount earned in the weekends of wide release. Fantasia 2000 has earned a total worldwide gross of over $90.8 million since its release, with $60.7 million of that total from the U.S. market, and the rest through foreign box office sales. The film had cost around $90 million and was viewed by Eisner as Roy Disney's "folly".

=== Critical response ===
On Rotten Tomatoes, Fantasia 2000 holds an approval rating of 80% based on 84 reviews, with an average rating of 7/10. Its consensus reads: "It provides an entertaining experience for adults and children alike." On Metacritic, the film has a weighted average score of 59 out of 100 based on 27 critics, indicating "mixed or average" reviews.

Entertainment Weekly gave a "B−" rating; its reviewer, Bruce Fretts, called Symphony No. 5 "maddeningly abstract", Piano Concerto No. 2 "charmingly traditional" and thought Rhapsody in Blue fit well to the music, but Pomp and Circumstance "inexplicably inspires biblical kitsch". The review ends with a criticism of the inadequate quality of The Sorcerer's Apprentice on the IMAX screen. Todd McCarthy of Variety pointed out that while the original Fantasia felt too long and formal, its "enjoyable follow-up is, at 75 minutes, simply too breezy and lightweight". He summarized the film "like a light buffet of tasty morsels rather than a full and satisfying meal".

In his December 1999 review for the Chicago Sun-Times, Roger Ebert gave the film a rating of three stars out of four. He described some of the animation (such as Firebird Suite, his favorite segment) as "powerful", though he thought others, like the dance of the abstract triangles in Symphony No. 5, to be "a little pedestrian". He admired Rhapsody in Blue and its interlocking stories, pointing out its style was reminiscent of the Madeline picture books by Ludwig Bemelmans. He thought Pines of Rome presented itself well in the IMAX format and found the Piano Concerto No. 2 played "wonderfully as a self-contained film", while he found The Sorcerer's Apprentice to be "not as visually sharp as the rest of the film". He nonetheless described the film overall as "splendid entertainment", and Ebert and fellow film critic Harry Knowles gave the film two thumbs up on the show At the Movies. Film critic Stephen Holden of The New York Times wrote that the film "often has the feel of a giant corporate promotion whose stars are there simply to hawk the company's wares" while noting the film "is not especially innovative in its look or subject matter." Firebird Suite was his favorite segment which left "a lasting impression of the beauty, terror, and unpredictability of the natural world". He found The Sorcerer's Apprentice fit well with the rest of the film and the battle in Symphony No. 5 too abbreviated to amount to much. He found the segment with the whales failed in that the images "quickly become redundant". He found Rhapsody in Blue to be the second-best in the film with its witty, hyper-kinetic evocation of the melting pot with sharply defined characters. He found the segment with the flamingos cute and the one with the tin soldier to be romantic. James Berardinelli found the film to be of uneven quality. He felt Symphony No. 5 was "dull and uninspired", the yo-yoing flamingos "wasteful", and the New York City-based story of Rhapsody in Blue interesting but out of place in this particular movie. He found the story of the tin soldier to successfully mix its music with "top-notch animation" and "an emotionally rewarding story". He felt the Firebird section was "visually ingenious", and Pomp and Circumstance the most light-hearted episode and the one with the most appeal to children, in an otherwise adult-oriented film. To him The Sorcerer's Apprentice was an enduring classic.

David Parkinson of British film magazine Empire rates the film three stars out of five, calling it a "curate's egg, with moments of hilarity and beauty alternating with the pompous and the banal". Moments of Symphony No. 5 and The Firebird he thought lacked the "abstract grace" from Toccata and Fugue from the original, and Pines of Rome was "even less successful" due to the computer imagery which affected its quality. He claims Rhapsody in Blue is "guilty of some dubious racial and sexual caricaturing", but hailed the film's IMAX presentation as "a breathtaking spectacle". He summarized the film as "slightly more successful" than the original Fantasia, more child-friendly and a "mixed bag of delights". Richard Corliss of Time magazine wrote a positive review of the film, citing Pines of Rome as "a superb, uplifting flight of the spirit" and Piano Concerto No. 2 "a gorgeous blend of traditional and computer animation". He drew a comparison to The Firebird with the 1997 Japanese animated film Princess Mononoke. Brian Sibley wrote a mostly negative review in Sight & Sound, a monthly magazine published by the British Film Institute, in June 2000. He pointed out that though the film includes moments of comedy and pastoral, "the themes running through the old 'Fantasia' – the struggle between light and dark, the war between chaos and order, the ultimate triumph of goodness – find only a pale equivalent in this new version". He compared the film's orchestra set to scenes from A Matter of Life and Death (1946) and thought the CGI in Symphony No. 5 lacked the technical qualities of Toy Story. Sibley argued the film lacked an even quality, highlighting Pines of Rome with its "breathtaking" opening before "its magic has been overtaken by chronic boredom" when the baby whale reunites with his parents. Pomp and Circumstance, he thought, contained "shamefully sloppy animation" but is saved by Donald's comical gags, but pointed out Rhapsody in Blue, with its "strong lines and vivid, flat colours that are fashionably retro", and the "classic Disneyesque ... exquisite beauty and raw natural violence" in Firebird Suite, as the film's most successful segments as they "ironically, hark back to older times".

=== Accolades ===
Award	Category	Name	Result
28th Annie Awards	Outstanding Achievement in An Animated Theatrical Feature	Walt Disney Pictures	Nominated
28th Annie Awards	Outstanding Individual Achievement for Character Animation	Eric Goldberg	Won
28th Annie Awards	Outstanding Individual Achievement for Production Design In an Animated Feature Production	Susan McKinsey Goldberg	Won
28th Annie Awards	Outstanding Individual Achievement for Production Design In an Animated Feature Production	Paul Brizzi, Gaetan Brizzi and Carl Jones	Nominated
28th Annie Awards	Outstanding Individual Achievement for Effects Animation	Ted C. Kierscey	Won
43rd Grammy Awards	Compilation Soundtrack Album for a Motion Picture, Television or other Visual Media	James Levine and the Chicago Symphony Orchestra	Nominated
12th PGA Golden Laurel Awards	Vision Award for Theatrical Motion Pictures		Won
1st Phoenix Film Critics Society Awards	Best Animated Film		Nominated
1st Phoenix Film Critics Society Awards	Best Family Film		Nominated

== Credits ==
Note: All segments performed by the Chicago Symphony Orchestra with conductor James Levine, except where noted.

Segment	Personnel
Live-action scenes	Director: Don Hahn; Art director: Pixote Hunt; Screenplay: Don Hahn, David Reynolds, and Irene Mecchi; Story development: Kirk Hanson; James Levine; Chicago Symphony Orchestra
Symphony No. 5 in C minor, I. Allegro con brio	Musical score: Symphony No. 5 in C minor, I. Allegro con brio by Ludwig van Beethoven (first movement only); Segment introduction: Deems Taylor (archival footage); Director: Pixote Hunt; Violinist: Itzhak Perlman; Design: Pixote Hunt
Pines of Rome	Musical score: Pines of Rome by Ottorino Respighi (abridged); Segment introduction: Steve Martin and Itzhak Perlman; Director: Hendel Butoy; Story: James Fujii; Art direction: William Perkins and Dean Gordon; Original concept: Brenda Chapman; Visual development: Francis Glebas and Kelvin Yasuda
Rhapsody in Blue	Musical score: Rhapsody in Blue by George Gershwin; Performed by the Philharmonia Orchestra; Segment introduction: Quincy Jones with Ralph Grierson; Director: Eric Goldberg; Writer: Eric Goldberg; Animator: Eric Goldberg; Art direction: Susan McKinsey Goldberg; Design consultant: Al Hirschfeld; Production manager: Loni Beckner-Black; Artistic coordinator: Dan Hansen; Assistant artistic coordinator: David Blum; Featured pianist: Ralph Grierson; Conductor: Bruce Broughton
Piano Concerto No. 2 in F Major, Allegro, Op. 102	Musical score: Piano Concerto No. 2 in F Major, Allegro, Op. 102 by Dmitri Shostakovich; Segment introduction: Bette Midler with Yefim Bronfman; Director: Hendel Butoy; Story development: James Capobianco and Ron Meurin; Art direction: Michael Humphries; Featured pianist: Yefim Bronfman; Original concept: Bianca Majolie; Visual development: Hans Bacher, Guy Deel, and Caroline Hu; Based on the story "The Steadfast Tin Soldier" by Hans Christian Andersen
The Carnival of the Animals (Le Carnaval des Animaux), Finale	Musical score: The Carnival of the Animals (Le Carnaval des Animaux), Finale by Camille Saint-Saëns, arranged by Peter Schickele; Segment introduction: James Earl Jones with Eric Goldberg; Director: Eric Goldberg; Writer: Eric Goldberg; Animator: Eric Goldberg; Art direction: Susan McKinsey Goldberg; Original concept: Joe Grant
The Sorcerer's Apprentice	Musical score: The Sorcerer's Apprentice by Paul Dukas; Performed by an ad-hoc makeshift orchestra of Los Angeles-based musicians, conducted by Leopold Stokowski; Segment introduction: Penn & Teller; Director: James Algar; Story development: Perce Pearce and Carl Fallberg; Art direction: Tom Codrick, Charles Phillipi, and Zack Schwartz; Background painting: Claude Coats, Stan Spohn, Albert Dempster, and Eric Hansen; Animation supervisors: Fred Moore and Vladimir Tytla; Animators: Les Clark, Riley Thompson, Marvin Woodward, Preston Blair, Edward Love, Ugo D'Orsi, George Rowley, and Cornett Wood; Based on the poem "The Sorcerer's Apprentice" by Goethe
Pomp and Circumstance – Marches 1, 2, 3 and 4	Musical score: Pomp and Circumstance – Marches 1, 2, 3 and 4 by Edward Elgar, arranged by Peter Schickele; Segment introduction: James Levine with Leopold Stokowski (archival footage), Mickey Mouse (voiced by Wayne Allwine), Donald Duck (voiced by Tony Anselmo), and Daisy Duck (off-screen; scream provided by Russi Taylor); Director: Francis Glebas; Art direction: Daniel Cooper; Story development: Rob Gibbs, Terry Naughton, Todd Kurosawa, Pat Ventura, Don Dougherty, and Stevie Wermers; Character animator: Andreas Deja (Mickey Mouse); Lead character animator: Tim Allen (Donald Duck and Daisy Duck); Visual development: William H. Frake III and Darek Gogol; Choir: Chicago Symphony Chorus; Soprano: Kathleen Battle; Based on the story "Noah's Ark" from the Book of Genesis
Firebird Suite – 1919 Version	Musical score: The Firebird (1919 Version) by Igor Stravinsky; Segment introduction: Angela Lansbury; Director: Paul and Gaëtan Brizzi; Writer: Paul and Gaëtan Brizzi; Concept (Death and Rebirth of the Forest): Elana Driskill; Art direction: Carl Jones; Visual development: Kelvin Yasuda; Lead character animators: Anthony DeRosa (Spring Sprite), Ron Husband (Elk), John Pomeroy (Firebird)

== Short films and cancelled sequel ==
Development on a third film began in 2002 under the working title Fantasia 2006. Plans were made to include One by One by Pixote Hunt and The Little Matchgirl by Roger Allers in the film before the project was cancelled in 2004 for unknown reasons, with the proposed segments instead being released as standalone short films.

Destino is an animated short film released in 2003 by The Walt Disney Company. Destino is unique in that its production began in 1945, 58 years before its eventual completion. The project was originally a collaboration between Walt Disney and Spanish surrealist painter Salvador Dalí, and features music written by Mexican songwriter Armando Domínguez and performed by Dora Luz. In 1999, Walt Disney's nephew, Roy E. Disney, while working on Fantasia 2000, unearthed the dormant project and decided to bring it back to life. It was later released as a bonus short on the special edition DVD and Blu-ray of Fantasia 2000.

Lorenzo is a 2004 American animated short film produced by Walt Disney Feature Animation about a cat named Lorenzo who is "dismayed to discover that his tail has developed a personality of its own". The short was directed by Mike Gabriel and produced by Baker Bloodworth. It premiered at the Florida Film Festival on March 6, 2004, and later appeared as a feature before the film Raising Helen; however, it did not appear on the DVD release of the film. Work on the film began in 1943, but was shelved. It was later found along with Destino.

One by One is a traditionally animated short film directed by Pixote Hunt and released by Walt Disney Pictures on August 31, 2004, as an extra feature on the DVD release of The Lion King II: Simba's Pride Special Edition.

The Little Matchgirl is a 2006 animated short film directed by Roger Allers and produced by Don Hahn. It is based on an original story by Hans Christian Andersen entitled The Little Girl with the Matches or The Little Match Girl, published in 1845.

== Bibliography ==
- Banagale, Ryan (2014). Arranging Gershwin: Rhapsody in Blue and the Creation of an American Icon. Oxford University Press. ISBN 978-0-19-997840-3.
- Berardinelli, James (2005). ReelViews 2: The Ultimate Guide to the Best 1,000 Modern Movies on DVD and Video. Justin, Charles & Co. ISBN 978-1-932112-40-5. Archived from the original on October 20, 2021.
- Culhane, John (1999). Fantasia 2000: Visions of Hope. Disney Editions. ISBN 0-7868-6198-3.
- Previn, André (1991). No Minor Chords: My Days in Hollywood. Doubleday. ISBN 978-0-385-41341-1.
- Holden, Stephen (2001). The New York Times Film Reviews 1999–2000. Taylor & Francis. ISBN 978-0-415-93696-5. Archived from the original on May 6, 2022.
- Solomon, Charles (1995). Disney That Never Was: The Stories and Art of Five Decades of Unproduced Animation. Hyperion. ISBN 978-0-7868-6037-1.
- Stewart, James B. (2006). DisneyWar: The Battle for the Magic Kingdom. Pocket Books. ISBN 978-0-7434-9600-1.

=== DVD media ===
- Donald W. Ernst (prod.), Roy E. Disney (prod.), James Levine (cond.) (November 14, 2000). The Fantasia Anthology: Fantasia 2000—Audio Commentary (Ernst, Disney, Levine) (DVD). Disc 2 of 3. Burbank, CA: Walt Disney Studios Home Entertainment. UPC 786936163872.
- Various segment directors (November 14, 2000). The Fantasia Anthology: Fantasia 2000—Audio Commentary (Segment Directors) (DVD). Disc 2 of 3. Burbank, CA: Walt Disney Studios Home Entertainment. UPC 786936163872.
- Various cast and crew members (November 14, 2000). The Fantasia Anthology: Fantasia 2000—The Making of Fantasia 2000 (DVD). Disc 2 of 3. Burbank, CA: Walt Disney Studios Home Entertainment. UPC 786936163872.
- Various cast and crew members (November 14, 2000). The Fantasia Legacy—Supplemental Features (DVD). Disc 3 of 3. Burbank, CA: Walt Disney Studios Home Entertainment. UPC 786936163872.
