= WWF Basic Adventure Game =

WWF Basic Adventure Game is a 1993 role-playing game published by Whit Publications.

== Gameplay ==
WWF Basic Adventure Game is a game in which the player characters are professional wrestlers.

== Publication history ==
Shannon Appelcline noted that after Ken Whitman published the role-playing game Mutazoids through his company Whit Productions, "He followed that up with a second company, Whit Publications, and two licensed games: Edward Bolme's Ralph Bakshi's Wizards (1992) and David Clark's WWF Basic Adventure Game (1993)."

== Reception ==
Tony Lee reviewed World Wrestling Federation Basic Adventure Game in White Wolf #45 (July, 1994), rating it a 4.5 out of 5 and stated that "What a smashing debut, ladies and gentlemtn! Now back to the ring for our next match."

Scott Haring reviewed the World Wrestling Federation RPG for Pyramid magazine and stated that "it's a good game. And it's a neat subject. And I'll give a flying elbow off the top rope to anyone who disagrees."

== Reviews ==
- Dragon #208 (Aug., 1994)
