= Starchaser: The Legend of Orin =

1985 American animated feature film directed by Steven Hahn

- Theatrical release poster
- Directed by: Steven Hahn
- Written by: Jeffrey Scott
- Produced by: Steven Hahn
- Starring: Joe Colligan; Carmen Argenziano; Noelle North; Anthony De Longis; Tyke Caravelli; Les Tremayne
- Edited by: Donald W. Ernst
- Music by: Andrew Belling
- Production company: Young Sung Production Co. Ltd.
- Distributed by: Atlantic Releasing
- Release date: November 22, 1985 (U.S.)
- Running time: 107 minutes
- Countries: United States; South Korea
- Language: English
- Budget: $14 million
- Box office: $3.3 million (Domestic)

Starchaser: The Legend of Orin is a 1985 animated space opera film directed and produced by Steven Hahn, and written by Jeffrey Scott. It was originally released in 3D by Atlantic Releasing. Starchaser: The Legend of Orin was one of the first animated movies to mix traditional and computer animation, as well as one of the first to be released in 3D.

== Plot ==
On the planet Trinia, human slaves live underground for millennia mining crystals for their "god" Zygon and his robots. Young miner Orin finds a jeweled sword embedded in the rocks. Hopps, grandfather of Orin's girlfriend Elan, recognizes it and dies saving Orin and keeping the sword a secret. Orin eventually grabs the sword, which levitates and buries itself in the cavern's floor. The blade projects the image of an old man, saying that above the caverns is a "magnificent universe". The blade then disappears, leaving only the hilt.

Orin and Elan decide to see this universe and find the blade. Chased by robots, they emerge in an industrial complex, where Zygon kills Elan. Orin escapes, digs a tunnel to Trinia's surface, where a mysterious "Starfly" bonds with him, and is captured by Man-Droids, decaying organic-robotic hybrids who intend to kill him and use his body parts to replace their own. The sword's hilt then produces an invisible blade, killing two Man-Droids and helping Orin escape. Orin subsequently runs into the human smuggler Dagg Dibrimi, who refuses to believe that there are slaves in the mines. Dagg steals crystals from a hovering freighter before encountering Zygon and his robots. Dagg seizes Fembot Silica, uses her as a shield from laser blasts and escapes with Orin. Subsequently, re-programmed by Dagg, Silica becomes attached to him.

Dagg flies his spaceship to the planet Bordogon, abandons Orin and gives Silica to a slave auctioneer. Orin wanders through Bordogon, investigating the blade's location. A fortune-teller eventually mentions a place called Novaluna. Orin later sees Silica offered for sale and offers high prices to buy her. After finding that Orin has no knowledge of local currency, the auctioneer takes the former's freedom in addition to Silica's; but Dagg, feeling guilty, frees them. Later, Dagg and Orin visit two merchants, to whom Dagg sells the crystals. Because Zygon has placed a price on Orin's head, the merchants offer to buy Orin as well, but Dagg refuses. In response, the merchants place a bomb in Dagg's payment, but Orin is forewarned by the Starfly, and Dagg throws the bomb into their enemies' camp. Thereafter, Dagg agrees to take Orin to Novaluna, but Zygon's robots shoot them down. Dagg is captured; Orin is thrown out of the ship, but Aviana, the daughter of Bordogon's Governor, rescues him.

Aviana's computer reveals that the hilt has historically been used by legendary guardians known as the Kha-Khan to vanquish threats to humanity. Among these threats was the tyrant Nexus, after whose defeat the hilt vanished until Orin found it. Aviana takes Orin to Trinia, where Zygon appears, and in the ensuing fight Orin exposes Zygon as a robot. Zygon reveals that he is Nexus, seeking again to control the galaxy with his robots. Zygon takes the hilt, while Orin and Aviana are imprisoned in the cell block wherein Dagg is also captive. Aviana is eventually taken aboard Zygon's flagship as a hostage. The Starfly brings Orin the hilt, which Orin uses to free himself and Dagg. They then take over Zygon's flagship and destroy the enemy fleet with the Starfly's help. Having restored Dagg's spaceship, Silica rejoins them.

Orin's party penetrates Zygon's base, but is attacked by more robots. While Dagg and Silica stay behind to fight off their pursuers, Orin enters his original cavern home and begins to denounce Zygon, who attacks and overwhelms him. Three Starflies appear and merge into one, stating that Orin has no need of the hilt, as "there never was a blade"; the power to create a cutting force came from Orin himself. Orin uses this force to kill Zygon, and his people revolt and win their freedom.

Above, Silica mistakenly attacks the accumulated crystals, which explode, triggering a chain reaction which threatens to collapse the mines. Aided by Orin, his people escape to Trinia's surface, where he uses his new-found power to heal his brother Calli of his blindness. Several Starflies appear and reveal themselves as the spirits of the previous Kha-Khan, including the man from the hilt's projection, and offer Orin a place among them. Orin refuses to join them for the time being to live with his friends and family, and the Kha-Khan depart.

== Cast ==
- Joe Colligan as Orin
- Carmen Argenziano as Dagg Dibrimi
- Anthony De Longis as Lord Zygon/Nexus
- Noelle North as Elan and Aviana
- Tyke Caravelli as Silica
- Les Tremayne as Arthur, Man-Droid #1, and Smuggler #1
- Daryl Bartley as Kallie
- Tina Romanus as Aunt Bella and Fortune Teller
- Thomas H. Watkins as Mizzo, Man-Droid #2, and Smuggler #2
- Mickey Morton as Mine-Master, Man-Droid #3, and Tactical Robots
- John Moschitta, Jr. as Z'Gork and Raymo
- Ken Sansom as Magreb and Major Tagani
- Mona Marshall as Star Fly
- Herb Vigran as Hopps/Elan's grandfather

=== Incidental and background voices ===
- Cathy Cavadini
- Marilyn Schreffler
- Susan Silo
- Michael Winslow

== Production ==
Steven Hahn, a veteran animator in TV animation, decided during the off-season to produce a feature film in order to give his South Korean animation studio something to work on. Jeffrey Scott had served as a writer on several of Hahn's TV projects so Hahn contacted him about collaborating on a film with Scott writing Escape to the Stars which would serve as the foundation for Starchaser.

Production on Starchaser began in 1982 with the intention of being released in 1983, but issues with the 3D process resulted in the film being delayed by two years and ballooning in budget from the initially planned $2 million to $6 million. Director Steven Hahn said of the production:

Since there hasn't been an animated film of this magnitude before we really had to work from scratch. The 3D aspect doubled the amount of shooting required. There were often mistakes, some requiring retakes that normally wouldn't have been necessary on a flat animated picture.

A digital plotter was used to transfer the CGI to paper, which had never been done in animation before. Starchaser: The Legend of Orin is also identified as the world's first full-length animated project to be made in the 3D format, although a prior film, Abra Cadabra (1983), was also produced in 3D.

Several months prior to the production and release, a lawsuit over the film was filed Between John Lemmons Films, Inc. and Atlantic Releasing Corp.

== Release ==
The film was released in the United States and Canada by Atlantic Releasing on November 22, 1985, grossing $1.6 million on its opening weekend from 1,020 screens, making it number 6 at the US box office. It grossed $3.3 million overall in the United States and Canada. The film did not fare well in South Korea, where animation production took place.

Starchaser: The Legend of Orin was released on VHS and Laserdisc on March 25, 1986, by Paramount Home Video, and also by KVC Home Video. The DVD was released on June 21, 2005, by MGM Home Entertainment.

== Reception ==
Vincent Canby described the film in The New York Times as "such a brazen rip-off of George Lucas' Star Wars that you might think lawyers would have been called in".

Gene Siskel and Roger Ebert both gave the film a "thumbs down", as they both found the movie uninspired and also felt the film was a rip-off of Star Wars.

Alex Stewart reviewed Starchaser: The Legend of Orin for White Dwarf #79, and stated that "if you're stuck with a houseful of brats on a rainy weekend, clamouring for some sanitised mayhem, then Starchaser's for you. It'll keep them quiet, and you'll probably find it amusing yourself".

== Potential remake ==
In March 2012, Rilean Pictures acquired the rights to develop Starchaser: The Legend of Orin into a live-action feature film, produced by Rilean Pictures' partners Jonathan Saba and Juan Iglesias.

== See also ==
- List of 3D films
