= Coonskin (film) =

1975 film by Ralph Bakshi

- Theatrical release poster
- Directed by: Ralph Bakshi
- Written by: Ralph Bakshi
- Based on: Uncle Remus by Joel Chandler Harris
- Produced by: Albert S. Ruddy
- Starring: Barry White; Charles Gordone; Philip Thomas; Scatman Crothers
- Cinematography: William A. Fraker
- Edited by: Donald W. Ernst
- Music by: Chico Hamilton
- Production companies: Bakshi Productions; Albert S. Ruddy Productions
- Distributed by: Bryanston Distributing Company
- Release date: August 20, 1975
- Running time: 83 minutes
- Country: United States
- Language: English
- Budget: $1.6 million

Coonskin is a 1975 American live-action/adult animated blaxploitation satirical crime film written and directed by Ralph Bakshi, adapted from the Uncle Remus folk tales. The narrative concerns three anthropomorphic characters, Br'er Rabbit, referred to as Brother Rabbit, Br'er Fox, referred to as Preacher Fox, and Br'er Bear, referred to as Brother Bear. They rise to the top of the organized crime racket in Harlem, encountering corrupt law enforcement, con artists, and the Mafia, in a satire of both racism within the Hollywood film system, and America itself. The film stars Philip Thomas, Charles Gordone, Barry White, and Scatman Crothers, all of whom appear in both live-action and animated sequences.

Originally produced under the titles Harlem Nights and Coonskin No More... at Paramount Pictures, Coonskin encountered controversy before its original theatrical release, when the Congress of Racial Equality accused the film of being racist. When the film was released, Bryanston gave it limited distribution and it initially received mixed reviews. Later re-released under the titles Bustin' Out and Street Fight, Coonskin has since been re-appraised, recontextualizing the film as the condemnation of racism that the director intended, rather than a product of a racist imagination, as its detractors had claimed. A New York Times review said, "Coonskin could be Ralph Bakshi's masterpiece." Bakshi has stated that he considers Coonskin to be his best film.

== Plot ==
Sampson and the "Preacher" rush to help their friend, Randy, escape from prison, but are stopped by a roadblock and a shootout with the police begins. While waiting for them, Randy converses with an escapee named Pappy, who claims to know a story about three people similar to him and his friends. Pappy's story is told in animation overlaid on a background of photos and live-action footage.

Brother Rabbit, Brother Bear, and Preacher Fox decide to pack up and leave the Southern states after the bank mortgages their house and sells it to a man who wants to turn it into a brothel. Arriving in Harlem, Rabbit, Bear and Fox find that all is not as it seems. They encounter a con man named Simple Savior, a self-styled revolutionary leader who claims to be the cousin of "Black Jesus", and that he gives his disciples "the strength to kill whites". In a stage show at his "church", Savior acts out being brutalized by symbols of black oppression—represented by images of John Wayne, Elvis Presley, and Richard Nixon, before asking his parishioners for "donations". Rabbit, well aware of the scam, tries to stir up anti-revolutionary sentiment in the crowd at the venue, prompting Savior to have him killed. After Rabbit saves himself with reverse psychology, he and Bear kill Savior. This allows Rabbit to take over Savior's racket, starting his climb to the top of organized crime in Harlem. As Rabbit prepares to deal with competition, Savior's former associates warn him that if he cannot kill his rivals, they will kill him.

Rabbit's first enemy is Mannigan, a virulently racist and homophobic police officer and bagman for the Mafia. He demonstrates his contempt for African Americans in various ways, including refusing to bathe before meeting them, which he feels they do not deserve. Mannigan is sent by the Mafia to find Rabbit, and his search takes him, along with his associates, Ruby and Bobby, to a nightclub called "The Cottontail".

A black stripper distracts Mannigan while an LSD cube is dropped into his drink. Mannigan, while under the influence of the drug, is maneuvered into a sexual liaison with an effeminate gay man, is adorned in blackface and dressed in a mammy outfit and finally thrown out the back of the club, where he discovers that Ruby and Bobby are dead.

He then goes into a frenzy and begins shooting wildly with his gun. The police arrive and order him to stop; Mannigan's uncontrolled burst of bullets kills a policeman and he is then killed by the patrol.

Rabbit's next targets are the Godfather and the Mafia, who live in the subway. The mission to kill Rabbit is given to Sonny, the Godfather's oldest son. The hitman waits near Rabbit's nightclub in blackface and clothing representative of minstrel show stereotypes, and a machine gun hidden in a banjo. Sonny attempts to kill Rabbit. Bear defends Rabbit, at the cost of getting shot by Sonny several times. When Sonny then attempts to escape in his car, he is shot multiple times by Rabbit, before crashing into a wall and dying in the explosion. Sonny's body is cremated and taken home, where his mother mourns him before trying to kill her husband in a rage only to get killed by one of his followers.

A recovered Bear finds himself torn between continuing to work with Rabbit or leading a crime-free life. Bear decides to look for Fox in order to seek his advice. Upon arriving at Fox's newly acquired brothel, Bear is "married" to Pearl, a girl that he, Fox, and Rabbit met during the fight with Savior's men. Following Fox's advice, Bear becomes a boxer for the Mafia. During one of Bear's boxing matches, Rabbit places a dummy of himself made of tar in the stands. The Mafiosi, wanting to kill Rabbit, fall into the trap: They stab the dummy and remain stuck in the tar. Rabbit leaves a bomb next to them and then he, Bear, Fox, and the opponent boxer rush out of the boxing arena before it explodes.

As Pappy's story ends, Samson and the Preacher finally arrive and aid Randy and Pappy in their escape amidst a hail of police gunfire.

The main plot of the film is interspersed with animated vignettes depicting the white, blonde, large-breasted "Miss America" who personifies the United States. In each of these short scenes, she seduces a man who represents the African American populace, only to instead beat or kill him.

== Cast ==
- Philip Michael Thomas as Randy
- Barry White as Sampson
- Charles Gordone as Preacherman
- Scatman Crothers as Pappy

=== Voices ===
- Philip Michael Thomas as Brother Rabbit
- Barry White as Brother Bear
- Charles Gordone as Preacher Fox
- Scatman Crothers as Old Man Bone / Simple Savior / Additional Voices
- Danny Rees as Mario The Clown
- Buddy Douglas as Referee
- Jim Moore as The Mime
- Al Lewis as The Godfather
- Richard Paul as Sonny
- Frank de Kova as Mannigan / Ruby
- Ralph Bakshi as Cop With Megaphone
- Theodore Wilson and Scatman Crothers as Minstrel
- Jesse Welles as Marrigold / Miss America (Note: The chuckles and vocal dialogue in Wizards with "Ellinore" sound similar to those for "Miss America" (and "Marrigold") in Coonskin.)

== Production ==
During the production of Heavy Traffic, filmmaker Ralph Bakshi met and developed an instant friendship with producer Albert S. Ruddy during a screening of The Godfather, and pitched Harlem Nights, a satirical adaptation of the Uncle Remus storybook, to Ruddy. In 1973, production of Harlem Nights began, with Paramount Pictures (where Bakshi once worked as the head of its cartoon studio) originally attached to distribute the film. Bakshi hired several black animators to work on Harlem Nights, including graffiti artists, at a time when black animators were not widely employed by major animation studios. Production concluded in the same year. During production, the film went under several titles, including Harlem Days and Coonskin No More...

A scene intended to satirize black stereotypes

Coonskin uses a variety of racist caricatures from blackface minstrelsy and darky iconography, including stereotypes featured in Hollywood films and cartoons. In the book That's Blaxploitation! Roots of the Baadasssss 'Tude (Rated X by an All-Whyte Jury), Darius James writes that "Bakshi pukes the iconographic bile of a racist culture back in its stupid, bloated face, wipes his chin and smiles Dirty Harry style. [...] He subverts the context of Hollywood's entire catalogue of racist black iconography through a series of swift cross-edits of original and appropriated footage." The film also features equally exaggerated portrayals of white Southerners, Italians, and homosexuals. The depiction of Jewish characters stems from stereotypes portrayed in Nazi propaganda, including The Eternal Jew.

In his review for The Hollywood Reporter, Arthur Knight wrote "Coonskin is not anti-black. Nor is it anti-Jewish, anti-Italian, or anti-American, all of whom fall prey to Bakshi's wicked caricaturist's pen as intensely as any of the blacks in his movie. What Bakshi is against, as this film makes abundantly clear, is the cheats, the rip-off artists, the hypocrites, the phonies, the con men, and the organized criminals of this world, regardless of race, color, or creed."

The film is most critical in its portrayal of the Mafia. According to Bakshi, "I was incensed at all the hero worship of those guys in The Godfather; Pacino and Caan did such a great job of making you like them. [...] One thing that stunned me about The Godfather movie: here's a mother who gives birth to children, and her husband essentially gets all her sons killed. In Coonskin, she gets her revenge, but also gets shot. She turns into a butterfly and gets crushed. [...] These [Mafia] guys don't give you any room."

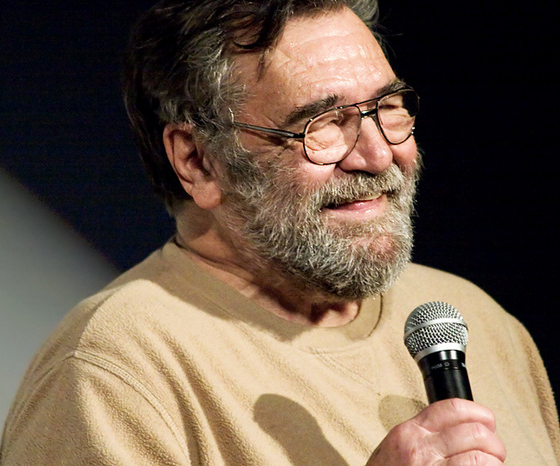
Writer and director Ralph Bakshi, 2009

The live-action sequences feature singers Barry White and Scatman Crothers, actor and playwright Charles Gordone, and actors Philip Michael Thomas, Danny Rees, and Buddy Douglas. Thomas, Gordone, and White also provide the voices of the film's main animated characters. In the film's ending credits, the actors were only credited for their live-action roles, and all voice actors who did not appear in the live-action sequences were left uncredited. Among the voices featured in the film was Al Lewis, best known for appearing as Grandpa on The Munsters. Bakshi also worked with Gordone on the film Heavy Traffic, and worked with Thomas again on the film Hey Good Lookin'. The film's opening credits feature a long take of Scatman Crothers performing a song on vocals and guitar called "Coonskin No More".

Coonskin uses a variety of different styles of artwork, filmmaking and storytelling techniques. Film critic Leonard Maltin wrote that Coonskin "remains one of [Bakshi's] most exciting films, both visually and conceptually." Darius James writes that Coonskin "reads like an Uncle Remus folktale rewritten by Chester Himes with all the Yoruba-based surrealism of Nigerian author Amos Tutuola." The film directly references the original African folk tales that the Uncle Remus storybooks were based on in two scenes that are directly reminiscent of the stories The Briar Patch and The Tar Baby.

Writer and former pimp Iceberg Slim is briefly referenced in the dialogue of Preacher Fox. The Liston–Ali fights are also referenced in the film's final act, in which Brother Bear, like Sonny Liston, is sold out to the Mafia. The film also features a pastiche of cartoonist George Herriman and columnist Don Marquis' "archy and mehitabel", in a monologue about a cockroach that leaves the woman who loves him. Bakshi has stated that Herriman, a Biracial American Creole, is his favorite cartoonist.

== Release ==
In order to attempt a contract killing on Brother Rabbit, white mobster Sonny disguises himself in blackface and clothing representative of minstrel show iconography, and uses a gun hidden in a banjo

When the film was finished, a showing was planned at the Museum of Modern Art. The Congress of Racial Equality (CORE) surrounded the building, in a protest led by chairman Elaine Parker. Gregg Kilday of the Los Angeles Times interviewed Larry Kardish, a museum staff member, and Kardish recalled that "About halfway into the film about ten members of CORE showed up. They walked up and down the aisles and were very belligerent. In my estimation they were determined not to like the film. Apparently some of their friends had read the script of the movie and in their belief it was detrimental to the image of blacks [...] The question-and-answer session with Bakshi that followed quickly collapsed into the chaos of a shouting match."

Animation historian Jerry Beck did not recall any disturbance during the screening, but said there were racist catcalls during the question-and-answer session, and Bakshi's talk was cut short. "It wasn't much of a madhouse, but it was kind of wild for the Museum of Modern Art."

Following the showing, the Paramount Building in New York City was picketed by CORE. Parker protested the film in January 1975, telling Variety that it "depicts us as slaves, hustlers and whores. It's a racist film to me, and very insulting." The Los Angeles chapter of CORE demanded that Paramount not release the film, claiming that it was "highly objectionable to the black community." The NAACP wrote a letter describing the film as a difficult satire, but supported it.

=== New distributor ===
With Paramount's permission, Bakshi and Ruddy were contractually released. As a result, the Bryanston Distributing Company became Coonskin's new distributor. Two weeks after the film opened, the distributor went bankrupt. According to a May 1975 issue of The Hollywood Reporter, Ben Gage was hired to re-record some of Barry White's voice tracks, in order to remove "racist references and vulgarity." Coonskin was given limited distribution, and advertised as a blaxploitation film. Roger Ebert wrote in his review of the film:

Coonskin is said by its director to be about blacks and for whites, and by its ads to be for blacks and against whites. Its title was originally intended to break through racial stereotypes by its bluntness, but now the ads say the hero and his pals are out "to get the Man to stop calling them coonskin." The movie's original distributor, Paramount, dropped it after pressure from black groups. Now it's being sold by Bryanston as an attack on the system. [...] Coonskin is provocative, original and deserves better than being sold as the very thing it's not.

In a 1982 article published in The Village Voice, Carol Cooper wrote "Coonskin was driven out of theaters by a misguided minority, most of whom had never seen the film. CORE's pickets at Paramount's Gulf and Western headquarters and, later, a few smoke bombs lobbed into packed Broadway theaters were enough; theater owners were intimidated, and the auxiliary distributor, Bryanston, couldn't book the film."

=== Distribution and discovery of the Paramount cut ===
Coonskin was released straight to VHS in Italy in 1992 by Gruppo Logica 2000, with an Italian dub recorded in Milan. For unknown reasons, the distributor received and used the original cut of the film shown at the Museum of Modern Art in 1974: this version primarily featured several changes in the order of scenes; and while some sequences, including the animated prologue, were missing, several others were longer or entirely unavailable in the standard version. This alternative cut is around 99 minutes long (accounting for PAL speedup), compared to 83 minutes for the Bryanston version. This situation went nearly unnoticed (and the film was never re-released in Italy) until in early 2023 the Italian YouTuber 151eg, in an attempt to rediscover the lost Italian dubbing of the film, contacted a private collector and purchased the VHS tape, only to discover the longer and different cut of the film. The Paramount cut with its Italian dub was subsequently published on the 151eg channel and on archive.org. In 2023 Italian publisher Sinister Film released Coonskin on DVD including both the standard and the extended version.

== Critical response ==
Initial reviews of the film were mixed. Playboy said of the film, "Bakshi seems to throw in a little of everything and he can't quite pull it together." A review published in The Village Voice called the film "the product of a crippled hand and a paralyzed mind." Arthur Cooper wrote in Newsweek, "[Bakshi] doesn't have much affection for man or woman kind—black or white." Eventually, positive reviews appeared in The New York Times, The Hollywood Reporter, the New York Amsterdam News (an African American newspaper), and elsewhere, but the film died at the box office.

Richard Eder of The New York Times wrote, "[Coonskin] could be his masterpiece [...] a shattering successful effort to use an uncommon form—cartoons and live action combined—to convey the hallucinatory violence and frustration of American city life, specifically black city life [...] lyrically violent, yet in no way [does it] exploit violence." Variety called the film a "brutal satire from the streets. Not for all tastes [...] not avant-garde. [...] The target audience is youth who read comics in the undergrounds." A reviewer for The Los Angeles Herald Examiner wrote "Certainly, it will outrage some and indeed it's not Disney. I liked it. The dialogue it has obviously generated—if not the box office obstacles—seems joltingly healthy."

Stanley Kauffmann of The New Republic wrote "Coonskin is a flawed but fierce little work of art, at a high level of imaginative energy and with some touches of brilliance".

== Legacy ==
Coonskin was later re-released under the title Bustin' Out, but it was not a success. In 2003, the Online Film Critics Society ranked the film as the 97th greatest animated film of all time. Coonskin was released on VHS by Academy Entertainment in late 1987, and later by Xenon Entertainment Group in the 1990s, both under the re-release title, Street Fight. The 1987 edition carried the disclaimer, "Warning: This film offends everybody!".

In 2010, Shout! Factory announced that Coonskin would be released on DVD in November 2010, intending to release it with a reversible cover with both titles of the film. The release was cancelled due to a legal issue involving ownership of the rights to the film, resolved with Xenon's DVD release in 2012. The 2012 release was the first official home video release to carry the film's original title. The film was first released on Blu-ray in Germany in 2015.

In September 2012, Bakshi incorporated animation from Coonskin into a new short film, Trickle Dickle Down, criticizing Republican presidential candidate Mitt Romney.

== See also ==
- List of American films of 1975
