= Francis Glebas =

American speaker, writer and film director

- Born: April 12, 1952 (age 73)
- Occupation(s): Storyboard artist, Film director, writer, keynote speaker, teacher
- Spouse: Denise Kress
- Website: http://francisglebas.weebly.com/

Francis Glebas (born April 12, 1952) is an American keynote speaker, writer, film director, storyboard artist, and teacher. He also directed in Fantasia 2000 (1999) and Piglet's Big Movie (2003). He worked in films such as Aladdin (1992), The Lion King (1994), Pocahontas (1995), The Hunchback of Notre Dame (1996), Hercules (1997), Dinosaur (2000), Treasure Planet (2002), The Incredibles (2004), Space Chimps (2008), Rio (2011) and Ice Age: Continental Drift (2012).

== Career ==
He has taught and consulted on animation, story, storytelling and storyboarding at the New York Institute of Technology, University of California, Los Angeles, Gnomon School of Visual Effects and Walt Disney Imagineering.

== Personal life ==
He has given Keynote speeches at TMRE 2016, CalArts 2016, Gnomon School of Visual Effects 2017.

== Filmography ==
- Aladdin (1992) - story and visual development artist
- The Lion King (1994) - story
- Pocahontas (1995) - story
- The Hunchback of Notre Dame (1996) - story
- Hercules (1997) - story
- Fantasia 2000 (1999) - director - segment Pomp and Circumstance and visual development - segment Pines of Rome
- Dinosaur (2000) - additional story artist
- Treasure Planet (2002) - story artist
- Piglet's Big Movie (2003) - director
- The Incredibles (2004) - storyboard artist
- Space Chimps (2008) - story artist
- Rio (2011) - story artist
- Ice Age: Continental Drift (2012) - story artist

== Publications ==
- Directing the Story: Professional Storyboarding and Storytelling Techniques for Live Action and Animation, Focal Press, 2008.
- The Animator's Eye, Focal Press, 2012.
- Iggy's Incredibly Easy Way to Write a Story, 2012
