= City Sourcebook =

City Sourcebook is a 1992 role-playing supplement for Mutazoids published by Whit Publications.

== Contents ==
City Sourcebook is a supplement in which the cities ruled by the Second Republic in the year 2073 are detailed.

== Publication history ==
City Sourcebook was published as the first release in a line of supplements for the second edition of Mutazoids.

== Reception ==
Christopher Earley reviewed City Sourcebook in White Wolf #35 (March/April, 1993), rating it a 3 out of 5 and stated that "Further details are omitted to avoid ruining the plot, but it's an interesting one. And any book that suggests listening to Joy Division must be good."
