= Pixote Hunt =

Director, artist, and animator

Pixote Hunt (or Maurice Hunt) is an American film director and animator. He has been involved in films such as The Black Cauldron, The Rescuers Down Under and Fantasia 2000, and was most prolific in the 1980s and 1990s.

== Filmography ==
=== As director ===
- 1994: The Pagemaster (as Maurice Hunt)
- 1999: Fantasia 2000 (segment "Symphony No. 5")
- 2004: One by One (video short)
- 2005: Hear My Cry (short)

=== As animator ===
- 1982: Fun with Mr. Future (short) (assistant animator – as Maurice Hunt)
- 1985: The Black Cauldron (as Maurice Hunt)

=== As character designer ===
- 1984: Snorks (TV series)
- 1985: Yogi's Treasure Hunt (TV series)
- 1986–1987: Foofur (TV series)
- 1988: The Completely Mental Misadventures of Ed Grimley (TV series)
- 1988: Fantastic Max (TV series)
- 1991: Adventures in Odyssey: The Knight Travellers (short)

=== As writer ===
- 2005: Hear My Cry (short)

=== As producer ===
- 2005: Hear My Cry (short)

=== As art director ===
- 1990: The Rescuers Down Under (as Maurice Hunt)
