= SnarfQuest =

- Author: Larry Elmore
- Launch date: 1983
- End date: 1989
- Publisher: Dragon Magazine
- Genre(s): Humor, Fantasy

SnarfQuest, drawn and written by Larry Elmore, is a fantasy comic strip with sci-fi and modern elements. Its epic fantasy-adventure context, along with its black-and-white art style, quirky humor, twinge of satire, and anachronistic elements, have earned it comparisons to Jeff Smith's acclaimed Bone series. It is the only comic series by Elmore, who is more widely known for his fantasy art paintings. The strip was originally serialized from 1985–1989 in the role-playing magazine Dragon, and, due to its popularity, subsequently spawned several collected volumes, tabletop games, and full-color followups by Elmore in 2000 and 2011.

== Publication history ==
SnarfQuest originally ran in Dragon Magazine from 1983–1989, debuting in issue #75 and running until No. 145 (75-78,80-145). The first story arc, detailing Snarf's quest to become king, was collected into a single 144-page book, entitled SnarfQuest: The Book, published by TSR in 1987; this edition also featured several never-before-published pages in full color including a story set five years after the previous story arc ends, in which Snarf and his friends confront a werewolf.

Due to popular demand, Elmore created a special one-shot episode, in color, which appeared in Dragon #200 (December 1993). In it, Snarf and Telerie help remove the curse a wizard has placed on a forest.

A 224-page collection, SnarfQuest: The Graphic Novel, was released in 2000, published by Dynasty Presentations; it reprinted the material from the 1987 edition as well as the remainder of the Dragon Magazine Snarf story arc (minus the 1993 one-shot). The material which was full-color in the 1987 version is greyscale in this newer compilation. A second edition was released 2002, this one by Larry Elmore Productions. The cover was changed, but this is the only difference between the two versions.

The SnarfQuest RPG Worldbook appeared in 2003. It featured stats, episode guides, character backgrounds and histories, and suggestions and mechanics for role-playing in the world of SnarfQuest. The book also included comments and analysis by Elmore as well as generalizable advice for adding humor to role-playing games.

An all-new, full color SnarfQuest story appeared as a bimonthly feature in the now-defunct magazine Games Unplugged beginning in 2000. The strip was gradually given fewer pages per issue until the magazine went out of business.

In 2011, Elmore began republishing the strips from Games Unplugged on the newly updated official SnarfQuest website. Once he reached the end of the Games Unplugged content, Elmore planned to create new strips for the foreseeable future. The classic strips from the original Dragon magazine run were also being gradually posted on the site, updated twice weekly. Soon after beginning the project, Elmore ceased to update the page, and the strips were taken down in 2012.

In January 2013, Elmore's blog announced that the Games Unplugged strips, originally slated to be republished on the website, would now begin running in the comic book Knights of the Dinner Table, beginning with issue #195. The reprinted strips would be in grayscale, although the original Games Unplugged strip had been in color.

In December 2013, Elmore launched a Kickstarter campaign to publish an all-new full color Snarf adventure, consisting of the existing Games Unplugged storyline, which Elmore would finally finish. The campaign exceeded its goal within one day.

== Other media ==
The SnarfQuest Card Game, published in the late 1990s and rereleased in 2001, is a boardless card game based on the comic which featured an unpainted Snarf miniature and a 100-card deck. Also available were four expansion packs (featuring Suthaze, Telerie, Aveeare, and Raffendorf miniatures and storylines respectively), five additional Snarf miniatures in different poses, and a bonus pack that included all nine additional miniatures and ten bonus cards.

Snarfquest is being adapted into a point and click video game, Snarfquest Tales, by Cellbloc Studios with a planned release date of 2016. As of July 2021, it has not been released.

== Cast of characters ==
Snarf – The eponymous Snarf is a male zeetvah—a humanoid being with long, batwing-like ears, and a dragonlike snout. Like all zeetvahs, Snarf comes from the village of Zeetville, located in the Vallys [sic] of Exotic Beings. Snarf is an adventurer of the comic-hero variety. More clever and opportunistic than brave or heroic, Snarf displays a certain "courage under pressure" and is usually able to talk or bluff his way through danger. His basic goals are to become rich and famous; however, he would rather steal treasure than directly fight for it. His full name—known only to family and close friends—is Snarfenia Dé Gottago [Also 'Snarfenja'].

Aveeare – Aveeare is a robot from space. Aveeare's ship crashed while surveying Snarf's homeworld. Snarf managed to convince the gullible Aveeare that he (Snarf) was a being of great importance: while Snarf was rummaging through a magical pack of holding (a magical belt pack that can hold as much as a large chest to the point that an average sized humanoid can physically climb into it with some effort), Aveeare was astonished at Snarf's apparent ability to change the natural laws of physics. Aveeare became Snarf's faithful sidekick. The name "Aveeare" is a shortened version of his identity code: he introduces himself to Snarf as "a VR-X9-4-M2 Galactic Probe, Government Issue Robot." Snarf thinks Aveeare is actually an armored wizard.

Telerie Windyarm – Telerie is a beautiful human woman and professional warrior. She is Snarf's faithful companion and romantic interest. Telerie is far more courageous (in some respects) than Snarf; she also lacks a sense of modesty, which tends to embarrass Snarf, although he learns to enjoy this quirk in the appropriate circumstances. Her surname is derived from her magical sword that can "split the wind." It can also deflect spells, such as lightning bolts.

Prince Raffendorf – Snarf's first traveling companion, Prince Raffendorf is human. However, some time ago he was turned into humanoid rat by the evil wizard Suthaze. Raffendorf wears an eye patch over his right eye, and is missing his tail—apparently by injury—He is more polite and has better manners than Snarf. The curse on Prince Raffendorf can only be reversed by Suthaze—not likely to occur, since Raffendorf helped Snarf destroy Suthaze's tower.

Suthaze – Suthaze is a bald, bearded, evil wizard. He used to have a "magic time jumping glass" – an hourglass that could transport the user into the future for 72 hours – with which he would plunder the future for fantastic treasures. According to his apprentice, Geezel, Suthaze was able to transport into the years 1967, 1978, and 1983, which apparently coincide with the "real world". On his visit to 1983, Suthaze acquired a motorcycle, a six-shot revolver, and stereotypical biker attire. Suthaze was a clever and powerful wizard; his tower was guarded by a variety of evil humanoids and the dragon Willie (see below). His tower was ultimately destroyed, accidentally, by Snarf and Prince Raffendorf in a conflict with Suthaze outside.

Geezel – Geezel is almeer, a humanoid being with a lizard-like face and over-sized ears. Although he was an apprentice for Suthaze, he is not evil: he merely wants to become a powerful wizard, and is willing to make any sacrifice to do so. He is not currently a very powerful wizard. For his role in recovering her stolen wand, he was granted a wish by Etheah of the Woodland (see below); he wished that she would fall in love with him and teach him magic, which she did.

Willie / Kizarvexius – Kizarvexius is an evil dragon; he has a split personality named "Willie" who believes that he is a duck. According to Geezel, the dragon was struck in the head by lightning during a powerful storm, and forgot who or what he was. Suthaze cursed the dragon into believing that he was a duck. Thus, Suthaze gained a powerful servant that could be easily controlled. In his "Willie" personality, the dragon spoke with a pronounced lisp, was afraid of snakes, played in an oversize water bowl, was quite gullible, and was friendly—even good-natured. He quickly became friends with the charming Snarf, and allowed Snarf to loot Suthaze's treasure room. Upon learning that the word "Dragon" broke the spell that Suthaze had placed on him, Snarf shouted the word at the dragon when leaving the room. As Snarf intended, upon hearing it, Willie reverted to his true personality as Kizarvexius, an evil, fire-breathing dragon and attacked his captors who were pursuing Snarf and his friends. After being caught in the explosion of Suthaze's tower, he once again considered himself to be a duck. So far, this has been permanent; hearing the word Dragon has not caused him to revert.

Etheah of the Woodland – Etheah is a good sorceress who lives in her own forested domain. Her wand of wishes was stolen from her by Suthaze, and she was not powerful enough to fight him in his own lair to win it back. She hired Snarf and Prince Raffendorf to rescue it, in return for one wish each on delivery of the wand. Because of the wish that Geezel made, Etheah is in love with Geezel and is teaching him magic.

Leech – The leech is a small, octopus-like creature with a single clawed arm. Originally called a "Gaggaleech", it came into Snarf's possession when he bought a Gagglezoomer in the town of 'Keynovia'. ~~ Gagglezoomer- a large, unintelligent lizard that will run at high speeds whenever anything touched the sensitive section of its back. (Hitched to a cart or wagon, Gagglezoomers could be used as fast, if unpredictable, beasts of burden.)~~ It was later revealed that the "Gaggaleech" was, in fact, a Darkshade death leech—an extremely venomous type of bloodsucking creature. Because of its heroic service in one instance, the leech was grudgingly given a diamond ring which turned out to grant its wearer a wish. The leech wished for the ability to communicate with every living thing, giving it telepathic ability. While trying unsuccessfully to communicate with Aveeare, it accidentally slipped one of its tentacles into one of Aveeare's dataports and seemed to absorb Aveeare's knowledge of science and technology; the leech fell into a coma, and was last seen tied to the back of a Whazzat Lizard, chased away by the spaceman 'Fred' and his Spaceship/Silver Dragon.

Fred – Fred is Aveeare's master who finds him through his homing beacon. Snarf and Telerie mistakenly think Fred has broken Aveeare's neck when he shuts down the robot. In revenge they knock Fred out and attach him, by his legs, to a Gagglezoomer and make the Gagglezoomer run away with him.

Effim – Effim is a maintenance droid on Fred & Aveeare's starship. His identity code is FM94763-2X817, which Telerie shortens to Effim.

B. B. Bird – B. B. Bird is a minstrel that Aveeare teaches how to play Rock 'n' Roll.
