= Donald W. Ernst =

American film producer (1934–2023)

- Born: Donald William Ernst; January 25, 1934; Los Angeles, California, U.S.
- Died: April 9, 2023 (aged 89); Stevenson Ranch, California, U.S.
- Other name: Don Ernst
- Occupations: Film editor; sound editor; music editor; film producer
- Years active: 1956–2011

Donald William Ernst (January 25, 1934 – April 9, 2023) was an American film, music and sound editor and film producer. He commonly worked in the animation industry.

Ernst started his career in television serving as editor on Gilligan's Island, Cimarron Strip and Gunsmoke, he later moved on to film editing. Ernst went to work at Ralph Bakshi's studio editing films such as Coonskin, The Lord of the Rings, Wizards and Hey Good Lookin'.

Upon joining Disney, Ernst got a chance to produce films such as Aladdin, Homeward Bound: The Incredible Journey and Fantasia 2000 (along with Roy E. Disney). He also produced the English voice adaptation of Spirited Away.

Ernst died on April 9, 2023, at the age of 89.

== Filmography ==
=== Producer ===
- Spirited Away (2002) (US production)
- Fantasia 2000 (1999)
- Homeward Bound: The Incredible Journey (1993) (executive producer)
- Aladdin (1992) (co-producer)
- Roller Coaster Rabbit (1990) (short film)

=== Editor ===
- Jake and the Never Land Pirates (2011) (editing on the first part of the 19th episode called "The Pirate Princess")
- Mind Games (1989) (music editor)
- The Brave Little Toaster (1987) (film editor)
- Starchaser: The Legend of Orin (1985)
- Silent Rage (1982) (music editor)
- Hey Good Lookin' (1982)
- The Jungle Family (1978)
- The Lord of the Rings (1978)
- Wizards (1977)
- Coonskin (1975)
- Heavy Traffic (1973)
- The Only Way Home (1972)
- Le Mans (1971)

=== Music department ===
- Mind Games 5.2
  - music editor (as Don Ernst)
  - 1989
- Stand Alone 5.2
  - music editor
  - 1985
- Seven Brides for Seven Brothers 6.6 TV Series
  - music editor (as Don Ernst)
  - 1982
- The Kid with the Broken Halo 5.5 TV Movie
  - music editor (as Don Ernst)
  - 1982
- Silent Rage 5.4
  - music editor (as Don Ernst)
  - 1982
- A Time to Die 4.2
  - music editor (as Don Ernst)
  - 1982
- Parasite 4.0
  - music editor (as Don Ernst)
  - 1982
- Soggy Bottom, U.S.A. 5.3
  - music editor (as Don Ernst)
  - 1981
- Early Warning 5.3
  - music editor (as Don Ernst)
  - 1981
- Earthbound 4.2
  - music editor
  - 1981
- A Time for Miracles 7.2 TV Movie
  - music editor: Echo Films (as Don Ernst)
  - 1980
- The Golden Moment: An Olympic Love Story 5.1 TV Movie
  - music editor
  - 1980
- The Comeback Kid 5.8 TV Movie
  - music editor (as Don Ernst)
  - 1980
- Attica 6.4 TV Movie
  - music editor
  - 1980
- She Came to the Valley 4.3
  - music editor (as Don Ernst)
  - 1979
- In Search of Noah's Ark 4.6
  - music editor (as Don Ernst)
  - 1976
- A Summer Without Boys 7.0 TV Movie
  - music editor (as Don Ernst)
  - 1973
- The Killing Kind 6.1
  - music editor (as Don Ernst)
