= Games Unplugged =

American magazine about tabletop gaming

Games Unplugged was an American magazine dedicated to the adventure tabletop gaming industry. The bimonthly magazine, headquartered in Lake Geneva, Wisconsin, ran for 34 issues, from June 2000 until May 2004.

The company also had a website, GamesUnplugged.com, which is now defunct.

== History ==
After running Archangel Entertainment, Ken Whitman next worked with Dynasty Presentations, in particular the new magazine Games Unplugged, Timothy Brown, James Ward, Lester W. Smith, John Danovich, and Sean Everette founded the d20 company Fast Forward Entertainment, which subsequently took over publication of Games Unplugged.

== Content ==
It featured news, products, designers and their companies, and upcoming releases of non-electronic role-playing games, card games, board games, and miniature wargames.

The magazine is most notable for running as a regular feature the most recent appearance of Larry Elmore's popular comic strip SnarfQuest. The magazine also featured writing by Margaret Weis on occasion.

== See also ==
- The Playing-Card
