= The SnarfQuest RPG Worldbook =

The SnarfQuest RPG Worldbook is a 2002 role-playing game supplement published by Elmore Productions.

== Contents ==
The SnarfQuest RPG Worldbook is a supplement in which the SnarfQuest comics are adapted.

== Reviews ==
- Pyramid
- Backstab
