= Groo: The Game =

1997 card game

Box cover of Basic Game, artwork by Sergio Aragonés, 1997

Groo: The Game is a card game first published by Archangel Studios in 1997 (later published by Steve Jackson Games.) It is based on the comic book Groo the Wanderer by Sergio Aragonés. In it, 2–4 players vie to construct the largest town.

== Rules ==
=== Components ===
The Basic Game contains:

- 60 cards, which include Groo Effects, Events, Buildings (each with a certain number of Victory Points), Troops, Wildcards, and one Groo card
- 7 blank six-sided dice, and stickers to be applied to the dice
- rule book

The game expansion published in 1997 contains 55 more cards.

=== Gameplay ===
Before the game, each player is dealt five cards.

Each turn, the active player may discard cards, then draw enough cards to bring their hand to five cards, and make one attack. They must then roll the dice to determine where Groo goes and what resources the player receives, allocate the received resources, and pass any unused resources to the player on the left, who uses any and passes the remainder to the left, and so on. Finally, if the active player has fewer than five cards, they draw enough to bring their hand back to five.

The first player to build a town with buildings worth seven Victory Points or more is the winner.

== Publication history ==
The first Groo the Wanderer comic by Sergio Aragonés appeared in the pages of Destroyer Duck #1 in 1981. In 1997, Aragonés and Ken Whitman designed Groo: The Game, which was published by Archangel Studios. An expansion set of 55 more cards was also released in 1997.

== Reception ==
Marcelo Figueroa of Shadis referred to the game as "one of the coolest cards games I've ever played".

Groo: The Game was reviewed in Pyramid #28 (Nov 1997), which said "Good news to both Groo fans and Groo novices is that this is an excellent game. While not a collectible card game, there is already one expansion set, which is also highly recommended."

In Issue 8 of Backstab, the magazine's editor, Croc, noted that fans of the Groo comics would love the game, and that "most of the drawings are hilarious and very descriptive of the cards' effects." But overall Croc was not impressed, giving it a very poor rating of only 4 out of 10 and saying, "Groo is a nice game to pass a little time, but doesn't contain enough content to become a classic."
