= Jesse Welles (actress) =

American actress (born 1946)

Jesse Welles Nathan
- Born: Jesse Welles; 16 April 1946 (age 79)
- Occupations: Actor; artist
- Years active: 1971–1988 (Actress)
- Spouse: Stephen Nathan (m. 1976)
- Children: 3
- Website: jwnathan.com (archive)

Jesse Welles Nathan (born 16 April 1946) is a former actress, perhaps known best for her voice role as Elinore in the 1977 animated film Wizards, directed by Ralph Bakshi.

== Career ==
Welles provided voices for three animated films directed by Ralph Bakshi: Coonskin (1975) as Marrigold and Miss America; Wizards (1977) as Elinore; and Hey Good Lookin' (1982) as Eva.

Welles played a lead role in three episodes of The Rockford Files: "Roundabout" (season 1, episode 25); "2 Into 5.56 Won't Go" (season 2, episode 10); and "A Different Drummer" (season 5, episode 22). She appeared in season 4 of the sitcom Soap as a prostitute who gets romantically involved with Danny, and she was a regular on Husbands, Wives & Lovers.

After 1988, Welles left acting and became an artist, and her work has been displayed at various galleries across Southern California, including the Schomburg Gallery. Her art style consists of mixed media with old photos drawn with balloons or vibrant colors.

== Film and television roles ==
- The Return of Count Yorga (1971)
- McCloud (TV series, 1974)
- Kojak (TV series) (1975)
- Coonskin (film) (1975)
- A Shadow in the Streets (TV movie) (1975)
- Switch (TV series, 1976)
- Wizards (1977)
- The Rockford Files (TV series, 1975-1979)
- Trapper John, M.D. (TV series, 1980)
- Hey Good Lookin' (1982)
- It Takes Two (TV series, 1982)
- Oh Madeline (TV series, 1983-84)
- Rhinestone (1984)
- T.J. Hooker (TV series) (1985)
- Family Ties (TV series) (1985)
- Fame (TV series, 1986)
- Hunter (TV series, 1988)
- Newhart (TV series, 1988)
