= Steve Gravers =

American actor

- Born: Solomon Gottlieb; April 8, 1922
- Died: August 26, 1978 (aged 56)

Steve Gravers (born Solomon Gottlieb; April 8, 1922, New York City – August 26, 1978, Studio City, California) was an American character actor who appeared in numerous television shows and several films in a career that lasted from 1952 until his death in 1978.

== Career ==
A life member of The Actors Studio, Gravers made his Broadway debut in the Studio's production of Michael Gazzo's A Hatful of Rain on November 9, 1955.

This was the same night on which Graver's first featured television performance was aired, a guest appearance on I Spy (not the popular hour-long series which would debut a decade later, but rather a half-hour anthology series hosted/narrated in character by Raymond Massey, as 'Anton the spymaster'), in an episode entitled "Bits and Pieces".

== Personal life ==
Steve Gravers married Vita Marcus, 1958-60, no children. Resided in Studio City, California until his death on 8/26/1978 from lung cancer.

== Selected credits ==
=== Films ===
- Al Capone (1959) - Albert Anselmi
- Hell Bent for Leather (1960) - Grover
- Operation Eichmann (1961) - Jacob
- 40 Pounds of Trouble (1962) - Daytime
- The Satan Bug (1965) - 2nd Fake SDI Agent (uncredited)
- Across 110th Street (1972) - Tailor Shop Patrolman
- Blood Sabbath (1972) - The Padre
- Wizards (1977) - Blackwolf (voice)
- The Car (1978) - Mr. Mackey

=== Television ===
- I Spy (1955) (S1:E3, "Bits and Pieces") - French Officer
- Peter Gunn (1959) (Season 1 Episode 20: "Pecos Pete") - Frank Kelly
- Have Gun - Will Travel (1959) (Season 2 Episode 16: "The Wager") - Howard Gorman
- The Untouchables (1959-1963)
  - (Season 1 Episode 3: "The Jake Lingle Killing") (1959) - Birch Henchman (uncredited)
  - (Season 3 Episode 4: "The Genna Brothers") (1961) - Tony Genna
  - (Season 4 Episode 21: "The Man in the Cooler") (1963) - Harry Tazik
- Alfred Hitchcock Presents (1961) (Season 6 Episode 32: "Self Defense") - Lieutenant Schwartz
- Alfred Hitchcock Presents (1962) (Season 7 Episode 20: "The Test") - Wickers
- Dr. Kildare (1963) (Season 3 Episode 2: "The Good Samaritan") - Albert Case
- The Alfred Hitchcock Hour (1963) (Season 1 Episode 15: "The Thirty-First of February") - The Psychiatrist
- The Alfred Hitchcock Hour (1964) (Season 2 Episode 12: "Three Wives Too Many") - Lieutenant Storber
- Rawhide (1964) (Season 7 Episode 9: "The Backshooter") - Fred Adams
- Combat! (1964) (Season 2 Episode 22: "Counter-Punch") - Tech Sergeant Martinez
- I Spy (1965-1966)
  - (Season 1 Episode 9: "No Exchange on Damaged Merchandise") (1965) - Captain Richards
  - (Season 2 Episode 7: "Sparrowhawk") (1966) - Patterson
- Bonanza (1966) (S7:E16, "To Kill a Buffalo") - Martinez
- Gunsmoke (1966)
  - (Season 11 Episode 16: "Death Watch") - Wales
  - (Season 12 Episode 5: "The Good People") - Jed Bailey
- Get Smart (1967) (Season 2 Episode 22: "Smart Fit the Battle of Jericho") - Carlos
- Here Come the Brides (1970) (Season 2 Episode 18: "Another Game in Town") - Barney Alton
- Alias Smith and Jones (1971-1972)
  - (Season 1 Episode 15: "The Legacy of Charlie O'Rourke") (1971) - Parson
  - (Season 2 Episode 14: "Miracle at Santa Marta") (1971) - Bookie
  - (Season 2 Episode 19: "The Biggest Game in the West") (1972) - Mattson
  - (Season 3 Episode 7: "The Ten Days That Shook Kid Curry") (1972) - Bartender
- Columbo (1972) (Season 1 Episode 6: "Short Fuse") - Sergeant
- Ironside (1972) (Season 6 Episode 6: "Riddle Me Death") - Taxi Driver Jones
- Kojak (1973) (Season 1 Episode 14: "Die Before They Wake") - Pullian
- The Marcus-Nelson Murders (1973) (TV movie) - Irwin David
- Charlie's Angels (1978) (Season 2 Episode 19: "Angel Blues") - Cooperman
