= Husbands, Wives & Lovers =

- Genre: Sitcom
- Created by: Hal Dresner; Joan Rivers
- Directed by: James Burrows; Marc Daniels; Alan Myerson; Bill Persky
- Theme music composer: Ken Welch; Mitzie Welch
- Composers: Jack Elliott; Allyn Ferguson
- Country of origin: United States
- Original language: English
- No. of seasons: 1
- No. of episodes: 10

Production
- Executive producers: Hal Dresner; Edgar Rosenberg
- Producer: Don Van Atta
- Editor: Marco Zappia
- Running time: 60 minutes
- Production company: 20th Century Fox Television

Original release
- Network: CBS
- Release: March 10 – June 30, 1978

Husbands, Wives & Lovers is an American television sitcom that aired for one season on CBS in 1978.

Created by Joan Rivers, this program focused on the relationships of five suburban couples living in the San Fernando Valley of Southern California.

== Development ==
The show originated as a pilot Husbands & Wives, which aired on July 18, 1977. It was written by Joan Rivers and Hal Dresner, and directed by Bill Persky, and garnered 18.3 million viewers. When the pilot was developed into a series, it was now filmed instead of taped. Stephen Perlman, Lynne Marie Stewart and Jesse Welles replaced Alex Rocco, Suzanne Zenor and Linda Miller in the roles of Murray, Joy and Helene respectively, the "Bells" were changed to the Bellinis, the "Cutlers" to the Willises and "Rita Bell" became Rita DeLatorre (with Lennie and Rita living together instead of being married).

== Cast and characters ==
- Cynthia Harris as Paula Zuckerman
- Stephen Pearlman as Murray Zuckerman, Paula's husband, a traveling pharmaceutical salesman
- Lynne Marie Stewart as Joy Bellini
- Eddie Barth as Harry Bellini, Joy's husband, a blue-collar self-made man who owns a fleet of garbage trucks
- Ron Rifkin as Ron Willis, a dentist who is separating from his wife
- Jesse Welles as Helene Willis, Ron's wife
- Charles Siebert as Dixon Carter Fielding, corporate lawyer who is representing Ron and Helene in their divorce proceedings
- Claudette Nevins as Courtney Fielding, Dixon's materialistic wife
- Mark Lonow as Lennie Bellini, Harry's brother who runs a jeans boutique
- Randee Heller as Rita DeLatorre, Lennie's lover, who co-runs the boutique

== Episodes ==
No.	Title	Directed by	Written by	Original release date	Viewers (millions)
1	"Ron and Helene Separate"	Marc Daniels	Harry Cauley	March 10, 1978	15.2
2	"Ron Moves In and Helene Steps Out"	Alan Myerson	Stephen Black & Henry Stern	March 17, 1978	16.7
3	"Ron Is Accused"	Marc Daniels	Steve Kreinberg & Andy Guerdat	March 24, 1978	13.3
4	"Everybody Is Looking for a Little Action"	Mark Daniels	Hal Dresner	April 7, 1978	14.2
5	"The Women Strike"	Jim Burrows	Joan A. Gil	April 21, 1978	12.3
6	"Dixon and Courtney Adopt"	Alan Myerson	Katherine Reback	April 28, 1978	12.0
7	"Murray Gets Sacked and Paula Gets Hired"	Jim Burrows	Ron Bloomberg	June 9, 1978	9.9
8	"Predictions Come True"	Marc Daniels	Andy Guerdat & Steve Kreinberg	June 16, 1978	10.3
9	"Women Write Stories and the Men Buy a Horse"	Jim Burrows	Martin Donovan	June 23, 1978	9.3
10	"Six Characters Flunk a Sex Quiz and Go Somewhere to Do Something About It"	Alan Myerson	Howard Ostroff	June 30, 1978	11.9
