= Ken Whitman =

American game designer

- Occupations: Game designer; filmmaker

Ken Whitman is an American game designer who has worked primarily on role-playing games and writes and directs films under the name Whit Whitman.

== Career ==
Ken Whitman was a graphic designer from Kentucky who formed the company Whit Productions so that he could publish the post-apocalyptic role-playing game Mutazoids (1989) and get started in the role-playing game business. Rick Swan in a review of Mutazoids in his book The Complete Guide to Role-Playing Games notes that "overall, designer Ken Whitman has done an impressive job of creating an attractively chaotic RPG environment."

Whitman followed that effort by starting a second company, Whit Publications, which published two licensed games: Ralph Bakshi's Wizards (1992) by Edward Bolme and WWF Basic Adventure Game (1993) by David Clark.

After his investors took over Whit Publications in 1994, Whitman became the Gen Con Convention Coordinator for TSR. Whitman had the goal of getting TSR a presence in 80 or more conventions in 1995. Whitman worked for TSR from 1994 to 1995. Whitman also worked on the Highlander role-playing game from Thunder Castle Games.

Whitman used this game convention experience and made contacts including Marc Miller, with whom he co-founded Imperium Games in February 1996 to publish Traveller releases. Whitman was president of the new company, and gathered several role-playing professionals to run it. Whitman helped design the fourth edition of Traveller, and wrote the rules for psionics for the system. Whitman was at the heart of financial disagreements between Imperium and its backer Sweetpea Entertainment, and eventually left because of these disagreements over money expenditures. Fans became increasingly vocal online because the company continued to promise products that never appeared, to which Whitman responded:

I feel that others who like starting rumers are only showing their own insecurities and anger to the world. Just because you have failed several time in you life, dont belive everyone else is like you. [Sic] - Ken Whitman, "Imperium Games & Treveller," rec.games.frp.misc (1996)

Whitman ran Archangel Entertainment from 1997 to 1998. While president of Archangel Entertainment, the company published Groo: The Game and the Zero and Dark Conspiracy role-playing games, and Whitman planned to distribute Archangel products in the United States through Chessex. Marcelo Figueroa of Shadis reviewed Groo and said that Whitman got "a burst of inspiration, and decides to make a card game about" the Groo: The Wanderer comic by Sergio Aragones, which he felt was "one of the coolest cards games I've ever played."

Whitman then ran Dynasties Productions, focusing on the new magazine Games Unplugged. Dynasties Presentations lasted from 1998 to 2001.

Whitman then managed Elmore Production, the art company of Larry Elmore. Whitman helped Elmore produce The Complete Elmore Art Book by funding it through crowdfunding.

Whitman then created print companies first with Rapid POD which lasted from 2005 to 2007, and he then created Sidekick Printing in 2010.

Whitman later began doing business in late 2013 as D20 Entertainment on Kickstarter. Whitman created and funded six projects on Kickstarter between December 8, 2013, and April 7, 2015, for three short movies and three gaming accessories. Whitman led d20 Entertainment into producing a Web series called "Brothers Barbarian." Whitman and Tim Gooch created the series and starred in the cast as the two brothers Russ and Art respectively.

Between 2021 and 2025 Whitman was the owner of Little Monster Entertainment, a film distributor that aims to connect independent film projects with streaming services. Their first film, Unnatural, was released on multiple streaming platforms in 2024.
