= Hey Good Lookin' (soundtrack) =

Soundtrack album by Ric Sandler
- Released: 2006
- Recorded: 1982
- Genre: Soundtrack
- Length: 52:42
- Label: That Philly Sound
- Producer: John Madara

The Hey Good Lookin' OST is the soundtrack to Ralph Bakshi's 1982 film Hey Good Lookin'.

The film's score was performed and arranged by Ric Sandler. The film's songs were co-written by Sandler and John Madara (born as John Medora). Because the film was not a box office success at the time of its release, a soundtrack album was not initially released. However, when the film became something of a cult hit later, people really got into the bizarre hybrid of '50's and '80's rock and petitioned online for a musical release " the film's soundtrack was finally released in 2006, 24 years after the film was first released.

== Track listing ==
1. Hey Good Lookin' - 3:01
2. Burnin' - 3:17
3. Crazy's Theme - 4:00
4. That Girl Was Mine - 2:45
5. South Street Walk - 3:41
6. I'm Cryin' - 2:33
7. Gittin' While The Gittin's Hot - 1:39
8. Our Love - 3:16
9. Don't Say Goodbye - 3:53
10. Just One Night - 3:03
11. Playin' To Win - 5:54
12. I'll Come Back - 3:32
13. Movin' (Cue) - 1:44
14. This Could Be Love (Cue) - 0:31
15. You Gave Your Love To Me (Cue) - 1:03
16. Slow Burn (Cue) - 1:55
17. Our Love (uptempo) - Vocal (Cue) - 2:13
18. Don't Say Goodbye - Piano (Cue) - 2:10
19. Playin' To Win - City (Cue) - 2:32
