= Elaine Parker =

American community activist (1926–2009)

- Born: Cora Elaine Smith; June 11, 1926; Washington, D.C., U.S.
- Died: December 30, 2009 (aged 83)
- Other names: C. Elaine Parker
- Spouses: Leonard R. Parker Jr.; Eugene A. Walker
- Children: 5

C. Elaine Parker, born Cora Elaine Smith (June 11, 1926 – December 30, 2009), was an American community activist who promoted and directed social, political, economic, and environmental change in Harlem.

== Early life and education ==
Parker was born in Washington, D.C. to Lawrence Smith and Mary Agnes Smith. She completed her primary education in Stafford, Virginia at the Stafford Training School.

== Career ==
She moved to New York at an early age, and there she began her modeling career and became the first black woman spokes model at the World's Fair. This was after the many struggles and protests that the Congress of Racial Equality (C.O.R.E.) waged for black employment and representation at the World's Fair.

=== Community service ===
Parker began her career as a community activist when she was elected president of the Parent Teacher Association at P.S. 100, Matthew Henson School in Harlem. This motivated her to become "a part of the solution”. Her strong sense of community activism was recognized by Congressman Adam Clayton Powell Jr., who selected her to be a part of his staff, where she served as an aide and community liaison.

Parker was a member of the Congress of Racial Equality (C.O.R.E). She subsequently became director of the Harlem branch of C.O.R.E. Parker went on to become a supervisor for the community-based organization, Citizens Action for a Safer Harlem (C.A.S.H.).

She was appointed director of the Northern Manhattan Office of the Borough President, Andrew Stein. She remained there until Stein became the president of the New York City Council, at which time she was appointed Ombudsmen for the New York City Council president's office.

While serving as an aide to Stein, she continued her education at The New School for Social Research where she studied psychology. She broadened her ability to solve community issues by furthering her studies at the New York Institute for Mediation and Conflict Resolution, where she received her certification as a mediator. She also considered her work in the community with the New York City Board of Education Title 1 program to be an important factor in her development.

Elaine was a member of the Abyssinian Baptist Church and served as a member of the board of directors for a variety of organizations, such as the Harlem Urban Development Corporation, the New York Urban League, Harlem Hospital Community Board, Community Planning Boards 10 and 11, Renaissance Health Care Network of Harlem Hospital, and the Central Harlem Senior Citizen Center. She was also vice-president of the 25th Precinct/Community Council, a member of the New York Coalition of 100 Black Women, and a former chairperson of the Board of Riverbend Housing Corporation where she lived for many years.

=== Business ===
C. Elaine Parker has been recognized for her service by the National Association of Negro Business and Professional Women and Who's Who in US Executives. She was a recipient of a number of awards, including the Mother Hale Community Service Award, the Harlem Hospital Community Service Award, and the President's Award from Malcolm-King Harlem College Extension. She has also been recognized by many for her great dedication to the people of Harlem, the community she loved.

== Personal life ==
Parker had five children: Michael, Alfred (deceased), Edna, Reena, and Leonard. She also had several grandchildren: Khalilah Smith, Sharrief Andrews, and Amirah Smith. She was survived by a host of other grandchildren, family, and friends.
