= One by One (2004 film) =

- Directed by: Pixote Hunt
- Written by: Pixote Hunt
- Produced by: Don Hahn
- Music by: Lebo M
- Production company: Walt Disney Feature Animation
- Distributed by: Buena Vista Pictures Distribution (Note: Distributed by Buena Vista Pictures Distribution through the Walt Disney Pictures banner.)
- Release date: August 31, 2004
- Running time: 6 minutes
- Country: United States
- Language: English

One by One is a traditionally animated short film directed by Pixote Hunt and released by Walt Disney Pictures on August 31, 2004, as an extra feature on the DVD release of The Lion King II: Simba's Pride Special Edition. The short was intended to be one of the segments for the proposed, but never completed Fantasia 2006 which was intended to be the second sequel of the 1940 animated film Fantasia and uses a song originally written for The Lion King.

== Plot ==
The film shows a story of children from a South African town flying kites down a hill after one boy is inspired by a colourful feather floating from the sky. The children find materials from places all over the town and produce equally colourful kites. After a walk, they fly the kites and release them into the sky for the ending of the film.

== Production ==
The short film takes its title and inspiration from One by One, a "freedom song" written and performed by Lebo M for The Lion King. Although the song was cut from the final film, it was used in the Disney Theatrical adaptation, before being used in the short.

== Credits ==
- Directed by Pixote Hunt
- Co-directed by David A. Bossert
- Executive producer: Roy Edward Disney
- Producer: Don Hahn
- Co-producer: Baker Bloodworth
- Associate producer: David Steinberg
- Art direction: Mike Humphries
- Music composed, arranged and produced by Lebo M
- Lead vocal performance by Lebo M

== See also ==
- List of Disney animated shorts
- The Lion King II: Simba's Pride: Special Edition 2-Disc DVD
