= Mutazoids =

Tabletop science fiction role-playing game

Cover art by Stephan Radford

Mutazoids is a science fiction role-playing game published by Whit Productions Inc. The first (1989) and second (1992) editions were designed by Kenneth E. Whitman Jr. The game focuses on urban crime fighting in the 21st century, after a viral pandemic has mutated many people.

== Description ==
Mutazoids is a science-fantasy system set in 2073, sixty years after a weird plague mutated humanity into three types: Acceptables, only slightly deformed; Mutazoids, mutant monsters; and Supers, humans with super-powers.

Players can create characters of any of the three castes, although game critic Rick Swan noted that most players take the roles of Enforcers. Characters have seven primary attributes, from which seven secondary attributes are derived.

The combat rules are very detailed, allowing biting, grappling, punching, slashing, tackling, tripping, and characters can choose from a list of weapons that covers brass knuckles to baseball bats to explosives.

== Publication history ==
Mutazoids was first published by Whit Productions Inc. in 1989. They then published the second edition rulebook and the City Sourcebook in 1992. In 2002 the game was acquired by MT Enterprises (Moses Wildermuth and Stephen Lee), who put out the 3rd edition in 2006.

== Reception ==
Stewart Wieck reviewed Mutazoids for White Wolf #20, rating it 3 out of 5 overall, and stated that "There is a lot of room for improvement in this game, and a long list of planned supplements may well do just that, but even now the game is a solid and certainly playable, RPG."

Rick Swan in his book The Complete Guide to Role-Playing Games summarized the game as "a cops-and-robbers RPG set in the future, where the cops are Dirty Harry-type anarchists and the robbers are bug-eyed nightmares from the Late Show." Swan found the combat rules "extremely detailed, but the level of complexity is about right for a game that stresses violent encounters such as this." Swan concluded by giving the game a solid rating of 3 out of 4, saying, "overall, designer Ken Whitman has done an impressive job of creating an attractively chaotic RPG environment."
