= Hey Good Lookin' (film) =

1982 film by Ralph Bakshi

- Theatrical release poster
- Directed by: Ralph Bakshi
- Written by: Ralph Bakshi
- Produced by: Ralph Bakshi
- Starring: Richard Romanus; David Proval; Jesse Welles; Tina Bowman
- Cinematography: William A. Fraker (unc.); Timothy Galfas (unc.)
- Edited by: Donald W. Ernst
- Music by: John Madara; Ric Sandler
- Production company: Bakshi Productions
- Distributed by: Warner Bros.
- Release date: October 1, 1982
- Running time: 77 minutes
- Country: United States
- Language: English
- Budget: $1.5 million

Hey Good Lookin' is a 1982 American adult animated comedy-drama film written, directed, and produced by Ralph Bakshi. The film takes place in Brooklyn during the 1950s and focuses on Vinnie, the leader of a gang named the Stompers, his friend Crazy Shapiro, and their respective girlfriends Roz and Eva. The film stars the voices of Richard Romanus, David Proval, Tina Bowman, and Jesse Welles.

The film was first completed in 1975 as a live-action/animated film, in which only the main characters were animated and the rest were portrayed by live actors, but the film's release was pushed back and later postponed indefinitely. Warner Bros. Pictures claimed that this version of the film was unsatisfactory; concerns about the backlash against Coonskin were also cited.

In 1982, a very different version of the film was released; much of the live-action sequences were replaced by animation, and dialogue was heavily rewritten and reedited. It was given a limited release in the United States and went largely unnoticed; it performed respectably in foreign markets and developed a cult following. The original version of the film remains unreleased. Bakshi has allegedly disowned the released version.

== Plot ==
In Long Island, a mysterious man shows a heavyset, middle-aged woman the remains of a leather jacket, which is of great sentimental value to the woman, and the man tells the story of the jacket's owner.

In 1953 Brooklyn, New York, Italian-American rebel, Vinnie Genzianna, is the leader of a greaser gang named "The Stompers". His best friend, Crazy Shapiro, is subject to multiple murder attempts by Crazy's detective father, Solly. While in an old basketball court, Vinnie reunites with an old flame Roslyn "Rozzie" Featherschneid, but their reunion is abruptly interrupted by Rozzie's protective Jewish father, who chains her to her bed to prevent her from seeing Vinnie again.

Vinnie and Crazy steal a car and spend the evening drinking, playing pool, playing pranks on others and seeing the entire town. They arrive at a bar where they encounter two prostitutes and rest on the beach, waking up to find themselves close to a group of showering women and their mobster husbands. While Crazy inches over to the ladies, Vinnie finds a dead body buried in the sand. The horrified screams of Vinnie and the women alert the mobsters, who beat up Crazy.

Vinnie runs off and finds himself on the black area of the beach where he bumps into rival gang leader, Boogaloo Jones, and his gang: "The Chaplains". Boogaloo sets up a rumble between his gang and the Stompers. Vinnie later meets up with Rozzie and Crazy's date, Eva. The four head out to a party, where Vinnie tells the Stompers that they are going to fight with the Chaplains, to which the gang responds negatively.

Much of the gang and their girlfriends head out to a rock and roll show. Vinnie is horrified at the idea of Crazy and himself having to fight the Chaplains alone. One of the Stompers, Sal, has a run-in with Boogaloo while driving and winds up in a car crash. Vinnie finally persuades the Stompers to rumble with the Chaplains through a passionate speech.

At a drive-in restaurant, Vinnie and Crazy both make out with their dates. When Rozzie spots a car that she thinks Boogaloo is in, Crazy is quick to drive off after it. Crazy ends up shooting two of the black gang members in an alley dead, which scares Vinnie into ditching town, Rozzie, and the rumble. Disgusted with Vinnie's cowardice, Rozzie allows Crazy to make love to her in an abandoned warehouse. Solly, who had been investigating the gang members' deaths, interrupts their time together and fights with Crazy to get him to talk. As he is losing, Crazy falsely claims that Vinnie killed the gang members.

During his departure, Vinnie bumps into the Stompers and in time for the rumble. As the two gangs wait for Boogaloo to show up, Solly drives up, ready to arrest Vinnie. On the rooftop of a nearby building, Crazy begins hallucinating and shoots randomly towards the street, causing both gangs to begin shooting at each other. Boogaloo is seen on the same rooftop as Crazy, hiding out from the rumble. Sal steps out of protection and is killed by a stray bullet, causing both gangs to cease fire and back away. Vinnie tries to flee and is shot at by Solly. Vinnie pretends to be hit, falls and plays dead. Crazy jumps off the rooftop and lands on Solly, killing them both. As Rozzie calls up a radio station to make a memorial request in honor of Vinnie, he stands up and walks away, unseen by anyone else. After seeing the town as he did before without Crazy, he finally leaves Brooklyn.

In a bar back in the present day, the mysterious middle-aged man finishes his tale by explaining that Vinnie left due to the heartbreak he felt at Crazy's death. The woman determines the mysterious man to be Vinnie and reveals herself to be Rozzie. She calls him out for his cowardice and bluffs that her husband will be arriving shortly and that he'll have to fight him for her, fully expecting him to avoid another fight and leave again. However, defying her expectation, Vinnie does not leave Rozzie and instead embraces her without hesitation and the two lovers joyfully reunite.

== Cast ==
- Richard Romanus as Vinnie Genzianna
  - Frank de Kova as Old Vinnie
- David Proval as Crazy Shapiro
- Tina Bowman as Rozzie Featherschneid
- Jesse Welles as Eva
- Shirley Jo Finney as Chaplin
- Philip Michael Thomas as Boogaloo and Chaplin
- Angelo Grisanti as Solly
- Candy Candido as Sal

== Production ==
After production concluded on Coonskin, Bakshi wanted to distinguish himself artistically by producing a film in which live action and animated characters would interact. Bakshi began writing the screenplay for Hey Good Lookin' while editing Coonskin and storyboarding a proposed series for ABC. The characters of Vinnie and Crazy Shapiro were based upon Bakshi's high school friends, Norman Darrer and Allen Schechterman. Warner Bros. Pictures had previously agreed to distribute Fritz the Cat before pulling their funding from that film, but they were eager to option the screenplay for Hey Good Lookin' and greenlit the film in 1973. Several African-American animators, including graffitists, were hired by Bakshi's studio at a time when black animators were not widely employed by major animation studios. Following controversy over the film Coonskin, some black animators left Bakshi's studio in embarrassment, resulting in production problems for Hey Good Lookin'.

Principal photography began in 1974. The budget was $1.5 million. Pre-production lasted one week, including casting. Grittier sequences were shot on the streets of New York City, while less serious locations were shot on Warner Bros.' sound stages in Los Angeles. According to Bakshi, "What I would do is dress guys up, live-action guys. Very strange dudes! The weirdest guys I could find. Having them talk to animated characters in front of candy stores, discussing girlfriends and such. It was very surrealistic." Yaphet Kotto and the glam punk band New York Dolls were cast in the live-action sequences, with the New York Dolls playing homosexuals. Mean Streets actors Richard Romanus and David Proval were cast as the voices of Vinnie and Crazy Shapiro. Much of the shooting of live-action sequences and recording of animated dialogue involved improvisation, with Bakshi setting up the premise of the scene and allowing his actors to create their own dialogue. During the "rumble" sequence, the actors playing the Chaplains were filmed popping and performing styles of dance which later evolved into breakdancing, dance styles which were unheard of in the 1970s studio system.

Bakshi had selected a number of songs from his own record collection for the film's soundtrack, which were not used in the film due to the high costs of licensing the songs. The film was initially scored by singer Dan Hicks, who became involved with the production of the film in 1974. Because of the delay of the film's release, Hicks' label released the material from these sessions under the title It Happened One Bite. When the film was released in 1982, it had been rescored by John Madara.

Much of the film was shot at night, because Bakshi felt that the daylight made the scenes less believable. Bakshi recounts that during the first day of shooting, the actors were unable to play their roles naturally, but began casually talking and acting the way he wanted their characters to act when the cameras were off, including flirting with an actress. However, the camera man was not around to capture these events, so Bakshi filmed them himself. When Bakshi excitedly told William A. Fraker about this, Fraker quit the production and was replaced by a young cinematographer who had never worked in film before.

=== Post-production ===
During the post-production of the film, Bakshi found that the cost of the optical effect required to complete live-action scenes with animated characters was larger than the film's budget. In order to complete these scenes cost effectively, Bakshi and his camera man Ted C. Bemiller purchased a 35-millimetre camera to project the footage onto the glass under the animation camera, which was reflected onto where the animation was shot. The same technique was used for the rotoscoped scenes in The Lord of the Rings. According to Bakshi, "The illusion I attempted to create was that of a completely live-action film. Making it work almost drove us crazy."

A three-minute promo of the live-action version of Hey Good Lookin' was screened at the 1975 Cannes Film Festival; a print of this promo is owned by the UCLA Film and Television Archive. The film was initially scheduled for a Christmas 1975 release, but was moved to the summers of 1976 and later 1977, before ultimately being postponed indefinitely. Warner Bros. was concerned about any controversy the film would encounter as a result of the backlash over the film Coonskin, despite the fact that Hey Good Lookin' did not contain any political content. The studio also felt that the film was "unreleasable" because of its combination of live-action and animation, but would not spend further money on the project. Bakshi financed the film's completion himself out of the director's fees for other projects he headed from 1976 until 1982, including Wizards, The Lord of the Rings, and American Pop.

Warner Bros. president Frank Wells told film trades that Hey Good Lookin' needed to be "fine-tuned", claiming that Bakshi needed to revamp the dialogue and reshoot some scenes because they had not tested well with market research audiences. During production meetings, Wells told Bakshi that he had not fulfilled his contractual obligations and had used more live-action than he said he would; Bakshi's lawyer was able to convince the studio not to sue him.

The majority of the live action footage was deleted. As Bakshi wanted to keep the breakdancing sequences, he used rotoscoping to animate the footage; however, he did not animate all of the movements for budgetary reasons. Little dialogue from the 1974 cut of the film was retained in the animated version. Instead, the latter version featured newly recorded dialogue by Proval, Romanus, and Philip Michael Thomas, who had starred in Coonskin.

== Release ==
Following the success of Heavy Traffic and American Pop, Warner Bros. became excited about the second version of Hey Good Lookin', forming a specialty division for the film's distribution. The film opened in New York City on October 1, 1982, and was released in Los Angeles in January 1983. Although it went largely unnoticed by the American public, it received respectable business in foreign markets.

Hey Good Lookin' developed a cult following through cable television airings and home video. The 1975 version of the film remains unreleased, although Warner Bros. owns a complete print.

Though a soundtrack album was not originally released at the time of the film's theatrical distribution, in 2006 the Hey Good Lookin' soundtrack was produced as a burned compact disc release of music from the film, with PC-printed inlays, through the independent record label That Philly Sound. The film is available to buy and rent on iTunes or as a manufacture-on-demand DVD release through the Warner Archive Collection.

=== Critical reception ===
In a brief review, Vincent Canby wrote that it was "not exactly incoherent, but whatever it originally had on its mind seems to have slipped away". Leonard Maltin wrote that the film is "more interesting visually than Bakshi's other later films, [...] but as entertainment it's vulgar and pointless."

Animation historian Jerry Beck wrote that "the beginning of the film is quite promising, with a garbage can discussing life on the streets with some garbage. This is an example of what Bakshi did best—using the medium of animation to comment on society. Unfortunately, he doesn't do it enough in this film. There is a wildly imaginative fantasy sequence during the climax, when the character named Crazy starts hallucinating during a rooftop shooting spree. This scene almost justifies the whole film. But otherwise, this is a rehash of ideas better explored in Coonskin, Heavy Traffic, and Fritz the Cat."
