= Joe Grant =

American storyboard artist (1908–2005)

- Born: May 15, 1908; New York City, U.S.
- Died: May 6, 2005 (aged 96); Glendale, California, U.S.
- Resting place: Forest Lawn Memorial Park
- Occupations: Caricaturist; character designer; concept artist; screenwriter; storyboard artist
- Years active: 1928–2005
- Employer: Walt Disney Animation Studios (1932–1949; 1989–2005)
- Spouse(s): June Hershey (m. 1930; div. 1934) Jennie Miller (m. 1933; died 1991)

Joseph Clarence Grant (May 15, 1908 – May 6, 2005) was an American conceptual artist, storyboard artist, and screenwriter.

== Early life ==
Grant was born on May 15, 1908 in New York City on the Lower East Side. He was the son of George Albert Grant and Eva Green. He had a younger sister, Geraldine. Grant was a second-generation descendant of Polish and Russian Jews. His father George (1885–1938) emigrated from Poland at age 5, with his parents Nathan Gumolinsky and Fannie (née Freund). Nathan adopted "Grant" as his surname after emigrating into the United States, supposedly because he had admired U. S. President Ulysses S. Grant.

Joe Grant moved to Los Angeles with his family when he was two years old, after his father was hired as an art director for William Randolph Hearst's Los Angeles Examiner newspaper. At a young age, Grant was exposed to his father's extensive collection of European art books, which included Honoré Daumier, Gustave Doré, and Ludwig Richter. He also accompanied his father to his workplace, where he reflected years later, he learned his artistic techniques by looking "over my father's shoulder."

By 1912, Grant's parents had separated, and along with his sister, he regularly relocated from New York and Los Angeles. At nine years old, Grant was hired as a contract player for Fox Film, appearing in uncredited roles for Jack and the Beanstalk (1917), Treasure Island (1918), and Fan Fan (1918). Grant attended Venice High School and later Chouinard Art Institute. In 1928, through his father's help, Grant was hired as an assistant cartoonist for the Los Angeles Record newspaper for ten dollars a week. There, he drew caricatures of famous personalities, including Greta Garbo, Barbara Stanwyck, Helen Hayes, and Joan Crawford.

== Career ==
=== 1932–1949: Years at Disney ===
Grant's caricatures caught Walt Disney's attention that he phoned him at his office, and hired him to design caricatures of Hollywood celebrities for the Mickey Mouse short, Mickey's Gala Premier (1933). His caricatures had been previously referenced—without credit—in the 1932 Mickey Mouse short, Parade of the Award Nominees, a cartoon produced for the 1932 Academy Awards. On September 9, 1933, Grant signed with Walt Disney Productions.

In 1934, Grant joined the story department, in which he shared an office with Albert Hurter and Bob Kuwahara. He contributed story sketches on several Silly Symphonies shorts, including The Grasshopper and the Ants (1934), The Tortoise and the Hare (1935), Water Babies (1935), and Alpine Climbers (1936). At home, he began coloring his pastel sketches to demonstrate his ideas and capture Disney's attention, and his approach was adopted by other story artists. Soon after, he began collaborating with Bill Cottrell on the Silly Symphonies. Contrell wrote the story outlines while Grant provided the story sketches. They worked on Who Killed Cock Robin? (1935), which featured a cast of animated birds; the character Jenny Wren was caricatured after Mae West and drawn by Grant.

In 1934, Grant, along with the animation staff, were first notified of Disney's plans for Snow White and the Seven Dwarfs (1937) when Disney acted out the entire story to his animation staff on a soundstage. Grant and Contrell were assigned to storyboard the scenes featuring the Evil Queen. Grant drew conceptual sketches for the Evil Queen in her regular appearance and her Witch form. According to John Canemaker, the Evil Queen was modeled after Joan Crawford, Katharine Hepburn, and Helen Gahagan's Queen in the 1935 film She. In 1999, Grant stated his inspiration for her Witch appearance was a female neighbor who "had a basket and used to pick persimmons." Grant and Albert Hurter received screen credit as the film's character designers.

During the fall of 1937, Disney was in active development on Pinocchio (1940), in which he pushed his staff to create a more realized film than Snow White. To strengthen the animators' drawings for the title character, Disney asked Grant how could they improve their technique. Grant suggested creating three-dimensional scale models known as maquettes so animators could draw the characters from different angles; Grant had earlier crafted a maquette for the Witch. Disney agreed and reassigned Grant to supervise the Character Model Department, which began on October 11, 1937.

As production continued, Grant's department helped to finalize the character designs, with ideas regarding costumes, props and settings to guide the animators, story artists, and layout artists. In their 1981 joint book Disney Animation: The Illusion of Life, Frank Thomas and Ollie Johnston stated no model sheet was finalized unless it bore the seal of approval: "O.K., J.G."

As Pinocchio continued in development, Disney assigned Grant to work on Fantasia (1940) as the "story director", in addition to supervising the Character Model Department. For the first time, Grant was partnered with Dick Huemer, which became as creative as his earlier partnership with Contrell. In September 1938, Disney, Grant, Huemer, Deems Taylor, Leopold Stokowski, and various department heads held a three-week story conference listening to multiple classical music recordings. During development for The Sorcerer's Apprentice, Grant drew pastel sketches for the old wizard. Martin Provensen, another character designer, also drew inspirational sketches; both men's artwork influenced the hiring of English silent film actor Nigel De Brulier to be photographed as live-action reference.

For Dumbo (1941), Disney assigned Grant and Huemer to write the story adaptation. Uniquely, they handed their 102-page script outline in chapters, much like a book, for Disney to approve. They conceived the stork-delivery and the pink elephants sequences, and had Dumbo's mother renamed from "Mother Ella" to "Mrs. Jumbo". They played on elephants' fear of mice by replacing a wise robin named "Red" found in the original story with Timothy Q. Mouse. They also added a "rusty black crow", which was later expanded into five characters. By February 1940, Dumbo had advanced first on Disney's production slate.

In 1937, Disney read the short story "Happy Dan, the Whistling Dog" by Ward Greene, an editor for King Features, which also distributed Disney comic strips. Disney told Greene, "Your dog and my dog have got to get together!" Greene agreed, and in 1943, he rewrote the story titling "Happy Dan, the Whistling Dog, and Miss Patsy, the Beautiful Spaniel." In 1944, Grant wrote a short story titled "Lady", which was published in a children's book Walt Disney's Surprise Package published by Simon & Schuster. This version of the story had a loyal female dog protecting the baby from two Siamese cats and introduced a mother-in-law character.

In 1945, at a story conference with Grant, Huemer, Disney, and members of the story department expanded on Grant's story. The mother-in-law character was rewritten into Aunt Sarah, and Disney suggested the name "Tramp". Ted Sears introduced the dog pound setting, and Greene suggested a romance between the two leading dog characters. However, Grant and Huemer objected to the idea, suggesting it was "distasteful" and "utterly contrary to nature." Story development was paused due to Disney scaling back animation projects to cheaper package films and would not resume until 1952. Despite his contributions to Lady and the Tramp (1955), Grant was not given screen credit. In 2006, Disney Home Entertainment acknowledged Grant's involvement in a making-of documentary.

In September 1943, Grant and Huemer were assigned to write a story adaptation for Cinderella (1950), but their preliminary story development was paused in 1945. In 1947, both worked on early story development for Alice in Wonderland (1951). Both men struggled with adapting Lewis Carroll's fantasy novel into a workable story outline. English author Aldous Huxley was hired to write new story treatments and eventually a script, which was too complex for animation that Grant complained "it only compounded the confusion." Grant's collaboration with Huemer ended in 1948, after Huemer was laid off from Disney.

=== 1949–1989: Interim years ===
By the late 1940s, Disney's interest in animation was waning as he looked to expand into live-action films, television, and an amusement park attraction. Grant had noticed and was angered, stating in first-person plural: "We thought [Walt] should do nothing but cartoons. And when he went into anything else, we felt a betrayal." On April 13, 1949, Grant departed from Disney. By then, the Character Model Department had been dissolved. That same year, inspired by his wife Jennie, Grant formed a ceramics company transferring photographs onto plates, as well created tiles and sculptures.

During the 1950s, he formed the greeting card company, Castle Ltd, which was later acquired by Williamhouse-Regency Inc. Grant reflected: "They said, 'If you don't let us buy you out, we'll take your line over.'" Grant agreed, and through the sale, he became financially independent. During the 1970s, he also founded Opechee Designs, another ceramics studio, with his wife.

=== 1989–2005: Return to Disney ===
In 1987, Charlie Fink was hired as the vice president for creative affairs for Disney Feature Animation, where he was tasked to revamp its story development process, based on its functionality during the 1930s and 1940s. Roy E. Disney, the animation department's vice chairman, asked Fink to meet with retired animation director Jack Kinney. At the time, Kinney had been in poor health, but he and his wife suggested Grant for the meeting. Fink had never heard of Grant, but after analyzing his animation credits, he agreed to meet with him. Grant, who had not expected a return to Disney, was persuaded by his wife to resume his animation career there.

Upon his return, his first project was The Rescuers Down Under (1990) where he submitted multiple unused character suggestions, including one for Marachute, envisioning her as a magical bird who played music. Regardless, his creativity fascinated directors Mike Gabriel and Hendel Butoy that Grant was asked to contribute more ideas on a part-time basis. In 1991, at 83 years old, Grant was rehired as a full-time employee.

Grant next worked on Beauty and the Beast (1991), in which he shared a third-floor office with fellow storyboard artists Vance Gerry and Burny Mattinson. During development, he submitted conceptual drawings of a teapot wearing a cozy scarf to the directors and Don Hahn. His drawings became the basis for the character Mrs. Potts. For Aladdin (1992), Grant worked as a story consultant, suggesting Abu (who was originally a human character) should be a monkey. He also wanted the magic lamp to be an anthropomorphic character. When directors Ron Clements and John Musker became the film's directors, they retooled the script and retained Grant's concept for Abu. Grant's idea for an anthropomorphic lamp was instead transferred to the Magic Carpet.

During development on The Lion King (1994), Grant submitted abstract character designs of lions and baboons, and created the characters Rafiki and Zazu. He also developed the relationship between Rafiki and Mufasa. Meanwhile, Grant began a close friendship with Mike Gabriel. After The Rescuers Down Under, Gabriel wanted to collaborate with him on a vastly different project. They worked on a version of Swan Lake, but their story treatment was rejected.

Gabriel subsequently pitched Pocahontas (1995), which was quickly approved for production. During the film's development, Grant remembered: "at first they relied so heavily on the script, things were beginning to get sort of pedestrian. It wasn't going anywhere. Then, we came in, Burny and myself, started adding animals and ideas, rewriting the script with pictures, little details, and stuff." Grant created the characters Redfeather, Meeko, Flit, and Grandmother Willow. The turkey character Redfeather was dropped after his intended voice actor John Candy died in 1994, and the decision to have him pantomime with feathers proved difficult. He was replaced with Meeko after Grant drew a sketch of a raccoon braiding Pocahontas' hair.

In 1997, future Pixar director Pete Docter was developing an original story treatment about monsters, with Harley Jessup, Jill Culton, and Jeff Pidgeon. On May 30, Docter pitched a retooled version of the story to Disney; there, Grant suggested the title Monsters, Inc., a play on the title of the gangster film Murder, Inc. (1960), which stuck. Meanwhile, on Mulan (1998), Grant created the cricket character Cri-Kee. Character animator Barry Temple stated directors Barry Cook and Tony Bancroft and the story artists were reluctant to have the character in the film, but Grant and Michael Eisner persisted. In 1998, Grant celebrated his 90th birthday, with his celebrity caricatures displayed at the Smithsonian Institution and his studio art collection honored at the Annecy International Animation Film Festival.

Grant then contributed to Fantasia 2000 (1999) where he suggested the idea of having one of the ostriches play with a yo-yo. The concept was changed to flamingoes based on Eisner's suggestion, and was incorporated into the Carnival of the Animals sequence.

By the turn of the 21st century, Grant was working four days a week at Disney. That same year, Grant and Mattinson developed an original film project titled Bitsy about an eponymous elephant who leaves India to try to make it in Hollywood, and ends up working in a used-car lot and falling in love. Both men drew the first act on storyboards and pitched the story, but the executives passed on the project; one of the executives suggested the project would be better suited as a live-action film. Furious at the rejection, Grant told the Los Angeles Times: "Walt would have backed it immediately, no question."

Meanwhile, Grant was hired as a consultant for the direct-to-video sequel Dumbo II for Disneytoon Studios. In March 2002, Grant was asked to judge the test footage for the film, which he considered to be lackluster. The project was placed on hold shortly after, and eventually cancelled.

In 2004, a short film titled Lorenzo, directed by Mike Gabriel, was released. The project originated from Grant's short story "Lorenzo the Magnificent" about a blue cat whose tail takes on its life of its own after crossing paths with a black cat. The finished short was intended for a planned third Fantasia film, but it was shelved due to cutbacks at Walt Disney Feature Animation. The short premiered at the Florida Film Festival and was attached with Raising Helen (2004). The short won an Annie Award for Best Animated Short Subject and was included at the Animation Show of Shows. It was also nominated for an Academy Award for Best Animated Short Film at the 77th Academy Awards.

Before his death, Grant was developing animation adaptations, including The Abandoned by Paul Gallico and Mr. Popper's Penguins by Richard and Florence Atwater. He also approved the script for Up (2009) directed by Pete Docter before it went into production. He also helped inspire the character Ellie, as in Docter's words, he was "really full of vibrancy about life and is always looking for new things and has interest in everything."

== Personal life and legacy ==
Grant married his first wife June Hershey, a songwriter, in 1930. Hershey most notably wrote the lyrics for the song "Deep in the Heart of Texas". Grant divorced Hershey on April 12, 1934. He met his second wife Jennie Miller through his sister Geraldine, who was Miller's high school friend. They married on March 13, 1933, but remarried again after Grant's divorce was finalized. They remained married until 1991, when she died from a lung ailment. They had two daughters, Carol and Jennifer.

On May 6, 2005, Grant died from a heart attack while working at his drawing board in his home studio, at age 96. On June 28, a celebration of life ceremony was held at the Alex Theatre in Glendale, California, where his friends, family members, and colleagues paid their respects. He is interred in the Forest Lawn Memorial Park Cemetery in Glendale, California.

Chicken Little (2005), released six months after his death, along with Pixar's Up, released 4 years after his death, was dedicated to his memory. In 2010, animation historian John Canemaker published a dual biography about him and Joe Ranft, who also died in 2005, titled Two Guys Named Joe.

== Filmography ==
Year	Film	Position	Notes	Refs
1933	Mickey's Gala Premier (Short)	Character designer	Uncredited	
1934	The Grasshoppers and the Ants (Short)	Character designer	Uncredited	
1935	The Tortoise and the Hare (Short)	Story; Character designer	Uncredited	
1935	The Golden Touch (Short)	Story; Character designer	Uncredited	
1935	Water Babies (Short)	Story; Character designer	Uncredited	
1935	Who Killed Cock Robin? (Short)	Story; Character designer	Uncredited	
1936	Alpine Climbers (Short)	Story; Character designer	Uncredited	
1937	Snow White and the Seven Dwarfs	Character designer		
1940	Pinocchio	Character designer		
1940	Fantasia	Story direction		
1941	Dumbo	Story		
1941	The Reluctant Dragon	Story – "Baby Weems"		
1942	Der Fuehrer's Face (Short)	Story		
1942	The New Spirit (Short)	Story	Uncredited	
1943	Education for Death (Short)	Story	Uncredited	
1943	Reason and Emotion (Short)	Story	Uncredited	
1943	Saludos Amigos	Story		
1944	The Three Caballeros	Story	Uncredited	
1946	Make Mine Music	Production Supervision		
1951	Alice in Wonderland	Story		
1955	Lady and the Tramp	Story	Uncredited	
1991	Beauty and the Beast	Visual development artist		
1994	The Lion King	Visual development artist Character designer		
1995	Pocahontas	Story; Visual development artist Character designer		
1996	The Hunchback of Notre Dame	Visual development artist Character designer		
1997	Hercules	Visual development artist Character designer		
1998	Mulan	Story		
1999	Tarzan	Visual development artist Character designer		
1999	Fantasia 2000	Original concept – (segment "The Carnival of the Animals")		
2001	Monsters, Inc.	Visual development artist		
2002	Treasure Planet	Additional visual development artist		
2004	Home on the Range	Additional visual development artist		
2004	Lorenzo	Based on an original idea by		

== Works cited ==
- Allan, Robin (1999). Walt Disney and Europe: European Influence on the Animated Feature Films of Walt Disney. John Libbey & Co. ISBN 978-1-8646-2041-2.
- Barrier, Michael (1999). Hollywood Cartoons: American Animation in Its Golden Age. Oxford University Press. ISBN 978-0-1980-2079-0.
- Barrier, Michael (2007). The Animated Man: A Life of Walt Disney. University of California Press. ISBN 978-0-5202-5619-4.
- Canemaker, John (1996). Before the Animation Begins: The Art and Lives of Disney Inspirational Sketch Artists. Hyperion Books. ISBN 978-0-786-86152-1.
- Canemaker, John (2010). Two Guys Named Joe: Master Animation Storytellers Joe Grant & Joe Ranft. New York: Disney Editions. ISBN 978-1-4231-1067-5.
- Culhane, John (1983). Walt Disney's Fantasia. Harry N. Abrams Inc. ISBN 978-3-8228-0393-6.
- Gabler, Neal (2006). Walt Disney: The Triumph of the American Imagination. Vintage Books. ISBN 978-0-6797-5747-4.
- Platthaus, Andreas (2020). "Creating Enchantment: The Making of Lady and the Tramp". In Kothenschulte, Daniel (ed.). The Walt Disney Film Archives: The Animated Movies 1921–1968. Taschen. ISBN 978-3-8365-8086-1.
- Thomas, Bob (1994) [1976]. Walt Disney: An American Original. New York: Hyperion. ISBN 978-0-7857-5515-9.
- Thomas, Frank; Johnston, Ollie (1981). The Illusion of Life: Disney Animation. New York: Hyperion. ISBN 0-7868-6070-7.
