= Baker Bloodworth =

- Born: 30 June 1962; Orinda, California, U.S.
- Occupation: Film producer
- Years active: 1990 - present

Baker Bloodworth (born June 30, 1962) is an American film producer best known for his work at Walt Disney Animation Studios on films including Beauty and the Beast (1991), Pocahontas (1995), Dinosaur (2000) and Gnomeo & Juliet (2011).

Bloodworth was nominated for an Academy Award for Best Animated Short Film at the 77th Academy Awards for Lorenzo. Based on an original idea by 95-year-old legend Joe Grant, Lorenzo was written, designed and directed by Mike Gabriel (Pocahontas and The Rescuers Down Under). Roy E. Disney and Baker Bloodworth, who collaborated on Destino, once again serve as exec producer and producer, with veteran Don Hahn (The Lion King) joining as exec producer.

Destino, produced by Bloodworth, was the unfinished collaboration between Walt Disney and Salvadore Dali which was also nominated for an Academy Award for Best Animated Short Film of 2003. Along with Don Hahn, Bloodworth also produced The Little Matchgirl directed by Roger Allers.

In 2006, the Walt Disney Pictures logo vanity card logo was updated with the release of Pirates of the Caribbean: Dead Man's Chest at the behest of then-Walt Disney Studios chairman Dick Cook and studio marketing president Oren Aviv. Designed by Disney animation director Mike Gabriel and producer Baker Bloodworth, the modernized logo was created completely in computer animation by Wētā FX and yU+co and featured a 3D Walt Disney logo.

Along with David Furnish and Steve Hamilton-Shaw, Bloodworth produced the 2011 animated film Gnomeo & Juliet featuring songs by Elton John.

== Filmography ==
Year	Title	Title	Notes
1991	Beauty and the Beast	Production Manager	
1995	Pocahontas	Associate Producer	
2000	Dinosaur	Co-Producer	
2003	Destino	Producer	
2004	Lorenzo One by One; Home on the Range	Producer Co-Producer; Special Thanks	Short Film Short Film
2006	The Little Matchgirl	Producer	Short Film
2011	Gnomeo & Juliet	Producer	
