= 77th Academy Awards =

- Official poster by Brett Davidson
- Date: February 27, 2005
- Site: Kodak Theatre; Hollywood, Los Angeles, California, U.S.
- Hosted by: Chris Rock
- Preshow hosts: Billy Bush; Jann Carl; Chris Connelly; Shaun Robinson
- Produced by: Gil Cates
- Directed by: Louis J. Horvitz

Highlights
- Best Picture: Million Dollar Baby
- Most awards: The Aviator (5)
- Most nominations: The Aviator (11)

TV in the United States
- Network: ABC
- Duration: 3 hours, 14 minutes
- Ratings: 42.14 million 25.4% (Nielsen Ratings)

The 77th Academy Awards ceremony, presented by the Academy of Motion Picture Arts and Sciences (AMPAS), took place on February 27, 2005, at the Kodak Theatre in Hollywood, Los Angeles beginning at 5:30 p.m. PST / 8:30 p.m. EST. During the ceremony, AMPAS presented Academy Awards (commonly referred to as the Oscars) in 24 categories honoring films released in 2004. The ceremony, televised in the United States by ABC, was produced by Gil Cates and was directed by Louis J. Horvitz. Actor Chris Rock hosted the show for the first time. Two weeks earlier in a ceremony at The Ritz-Carlton Huntington Hotel & Spa in Pasadena, California, held on February 12, the Academy Awards for Technical Achievement were presented by host Scarlett Johansson.

Million Dollar Baby won four awards, including Best Picture. Other winners included The Aviator with five awards, The Incredibles and Ray with two, and Born into Brothels: Calcutta's Red Light Kids, Eternal Sunshine of the Spotless Mind, Finding Neverland, Lemony Snicket's A Series of Unfortunate Events, Mighty Times: The Children's March, The Motorcycle Diaries, Ryan, The Sea Inside, Sideways, Spider-Man 2, and Wasp with one. The telecast garnered over 42 million viewers in the United States alone.

== Winners and nominees ==
The nominees for the 77th Academy Awards were announced on January 25, 2005, at the Samuel Goldwyn Theater in Beverly Hills, California, by Frank Pierson, president of the academy, and actor Adrien Brody. The Aviator received the most nominations with eleven; Finding Neverland and Million Dollar Baby tied for second with seven nominations each.

The winners were announced during the awards ceremony on February 27, 2005. At age 74, Clint Eastwood became the oldest winner for Best Director in Oscar history. With his latest unsuccessful nomination for directing The Aviator, nominee Martin Scorsese joined Robert Altman, Clarence Brown, Alfred Hitchcock, and King Vidor as the most nominated individuals in the Best Director category without a single win at the time. Best Actor winner Jamie Foxx became the third actor and tenth individual overall to earn two acting nominations in the same year. By virtue of her portrayal of Katharine Hepburn, Best Supporting Actress winner Cate Blanchett was the first performer to win an Academy Award for a portrayal of a previous Academy Award winner. "Al otro lado del río" from The Motorcycle Diaries became the second song with non-English lyrics to win Best Original Song. The first to achieve this feat was the titular song from the 1960 Greek film Never on Sunday at the 33rd Academy Awards.

=== Awards ===
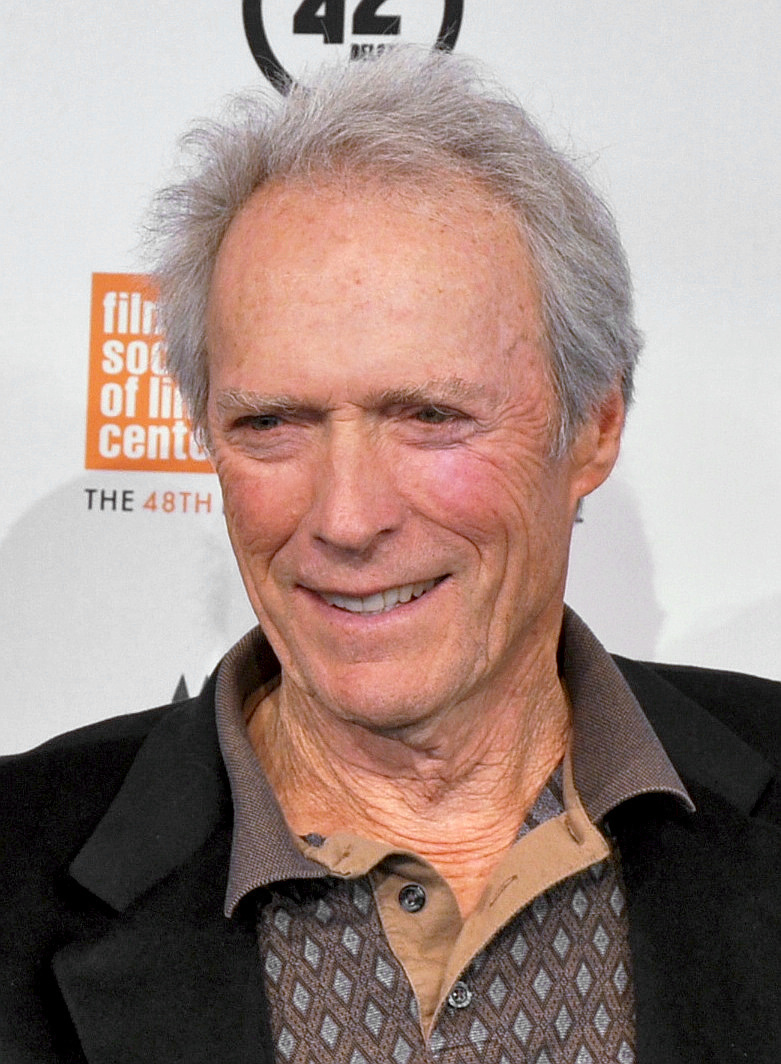
Clint Eastwood, Best Director winner and Best Picture co-winner

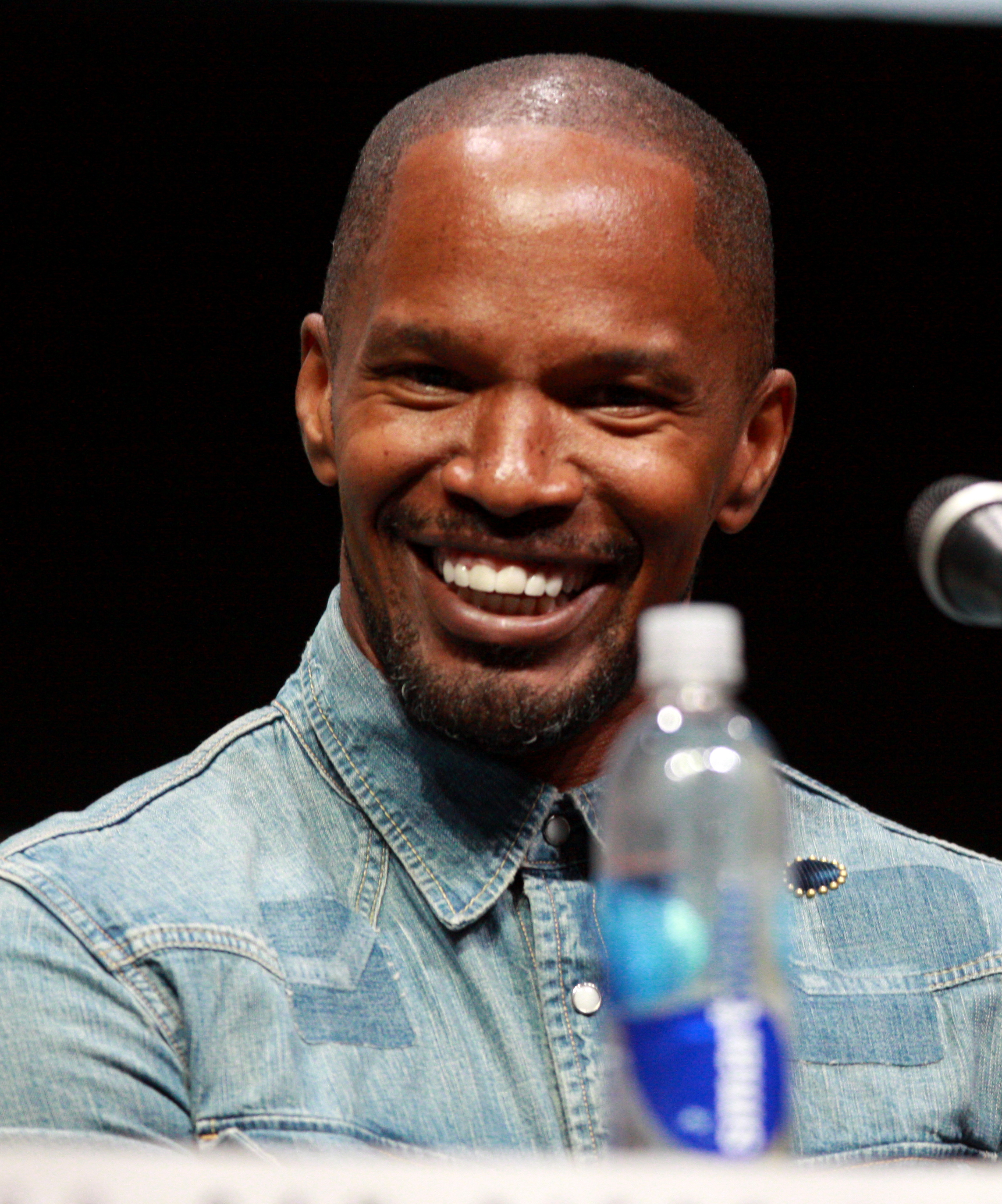
Jamie Foxx, Best Actor winner

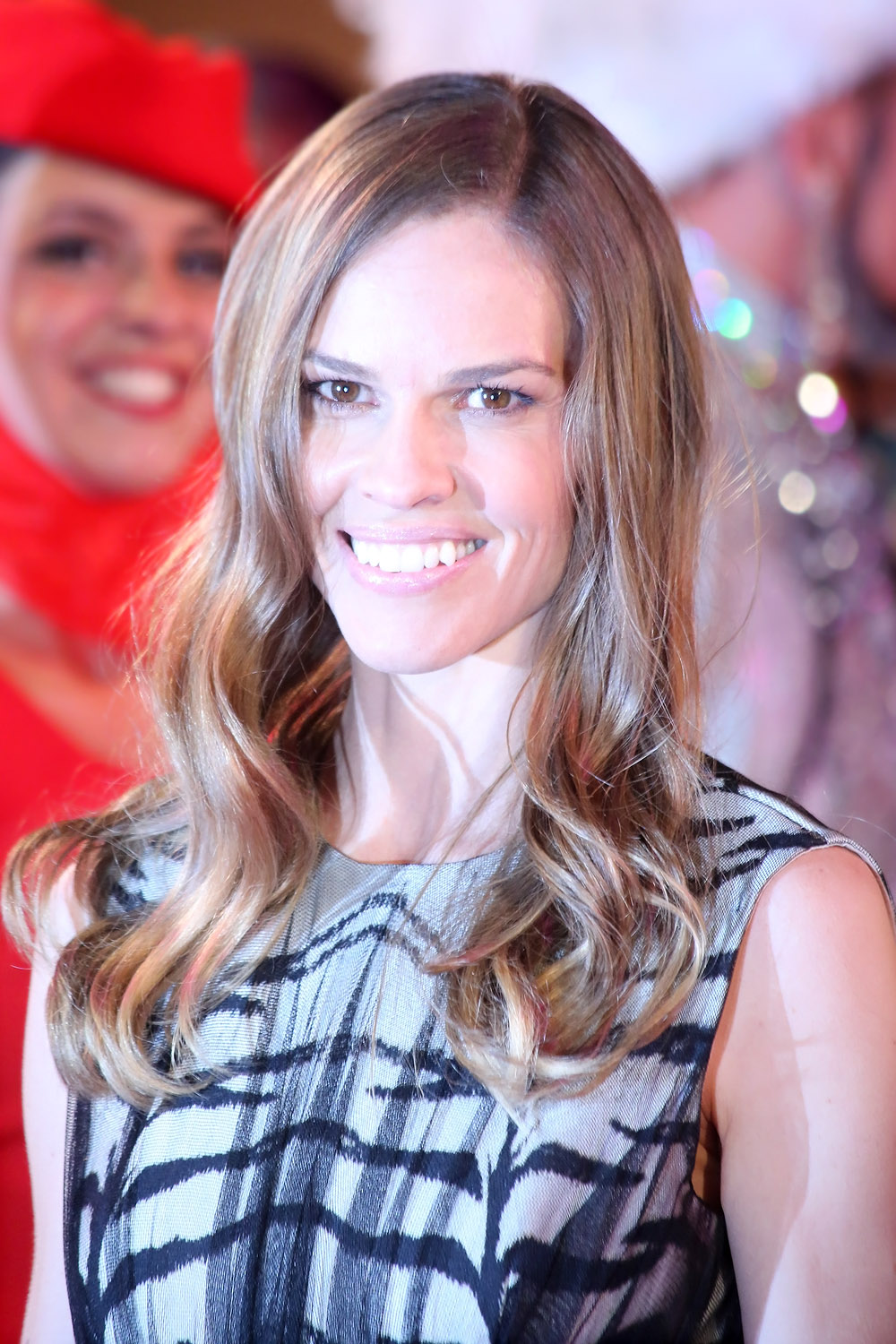
Hilary Swank, Best Actress winner

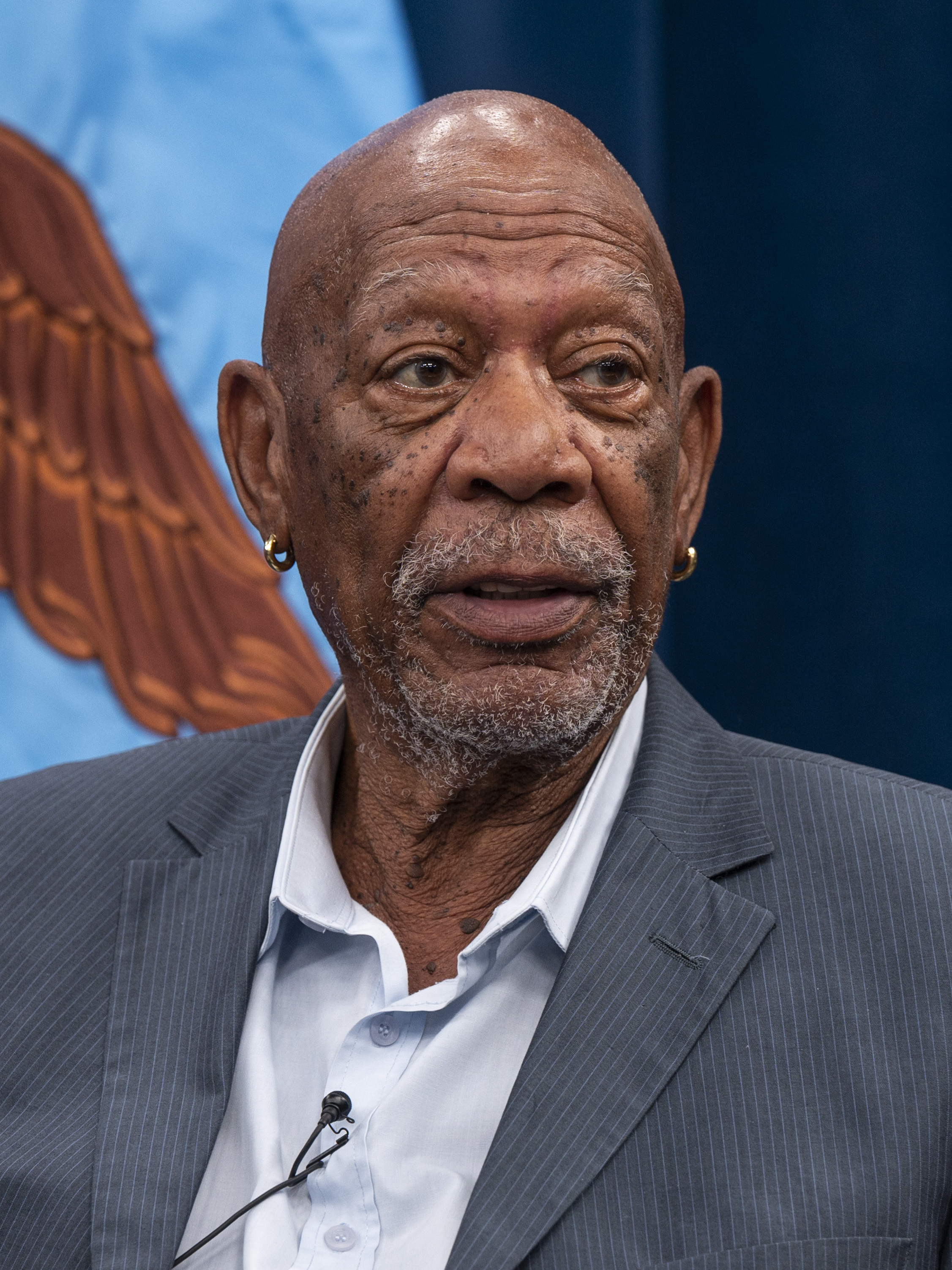
Morgan Freeman, Best Supporting Actor winner

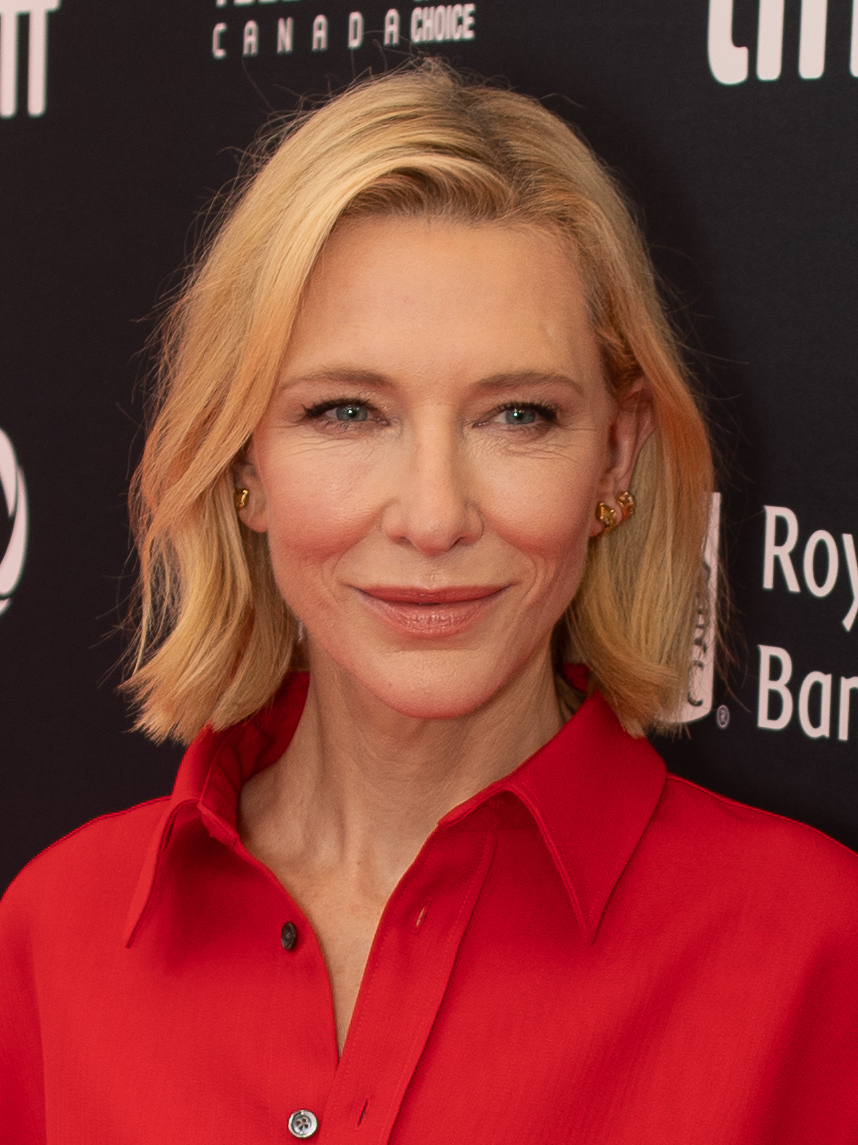
Cate Blanchett, Best Supporting Actress winner

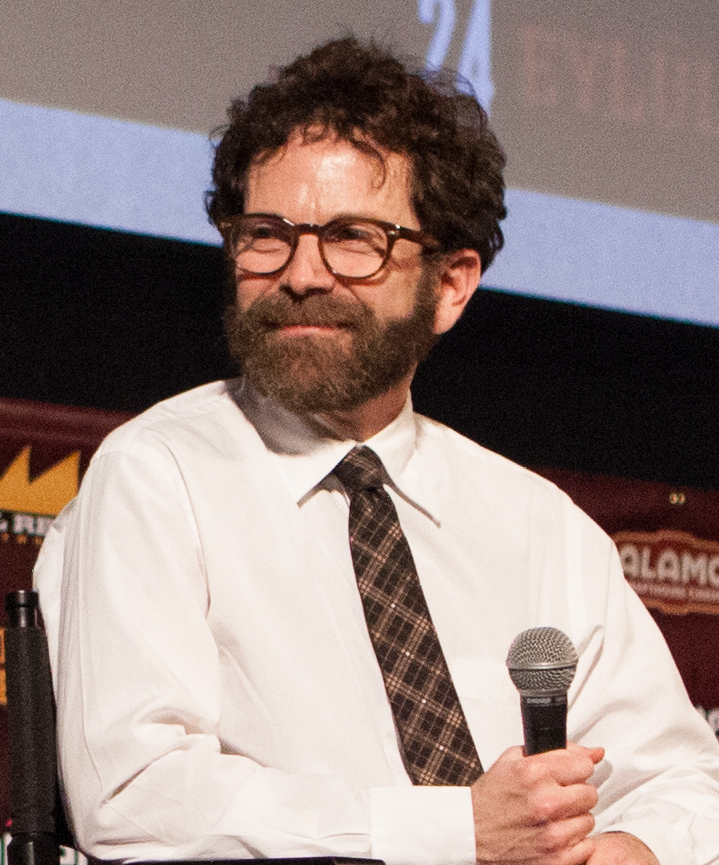
Charlie Kaufman, Best Original Screenplay co-winner

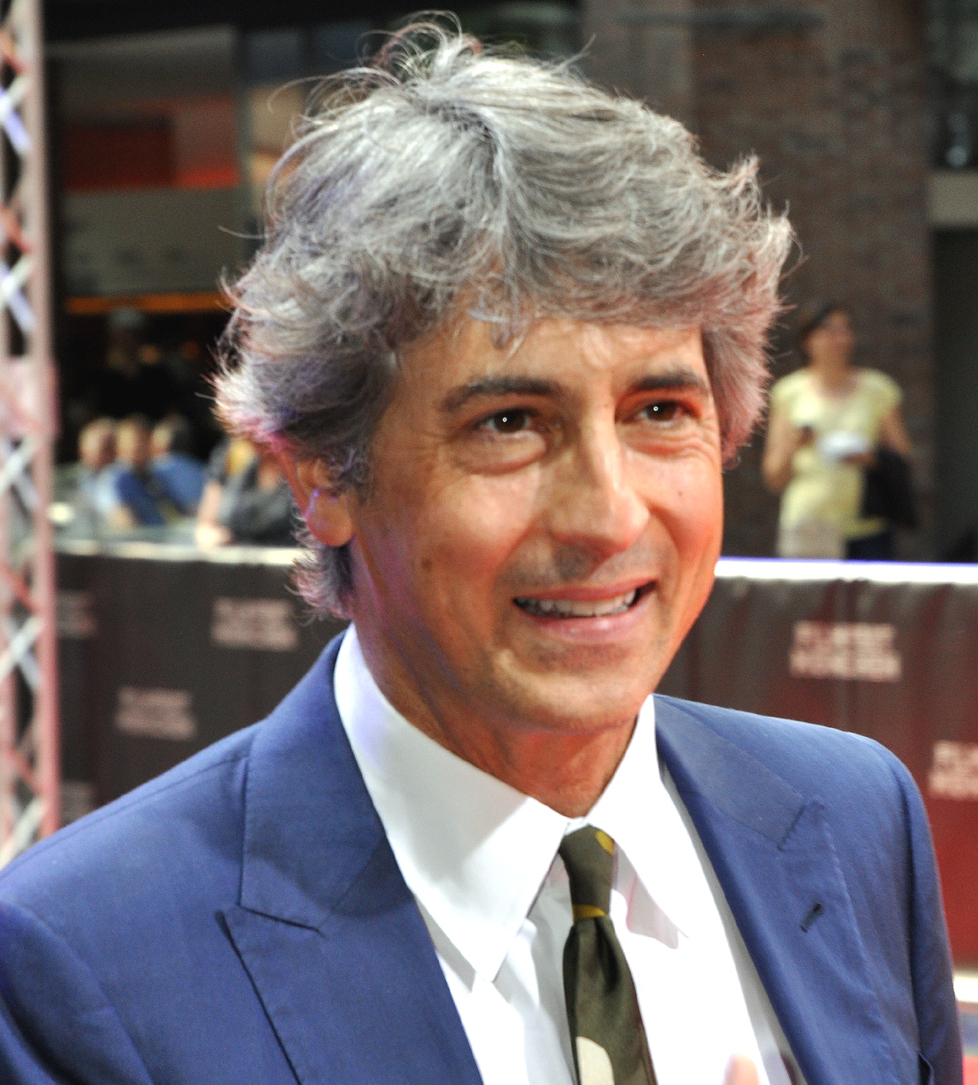
Alexander Payne, Best Adapted Screenplay co-winner

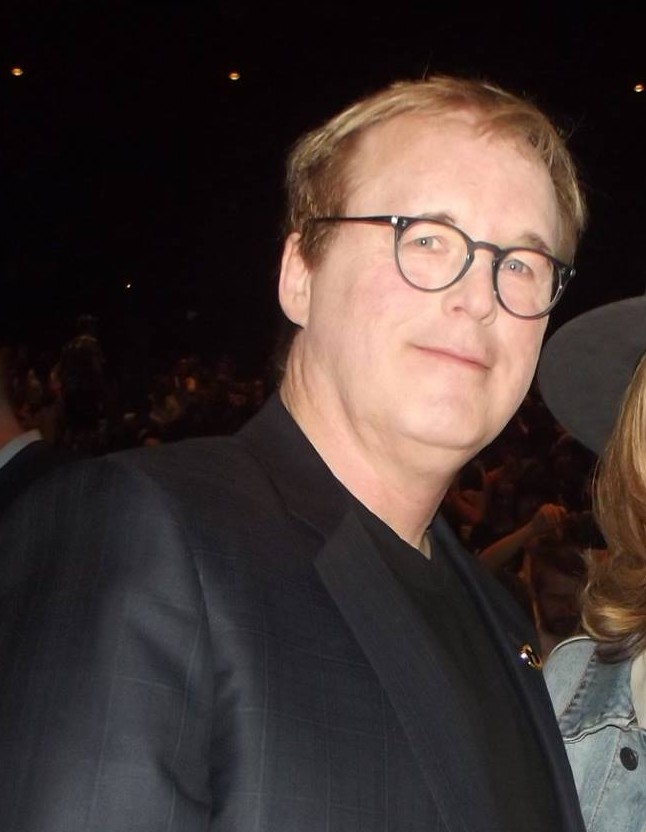
Brad Bird, Best Animated Feature winner

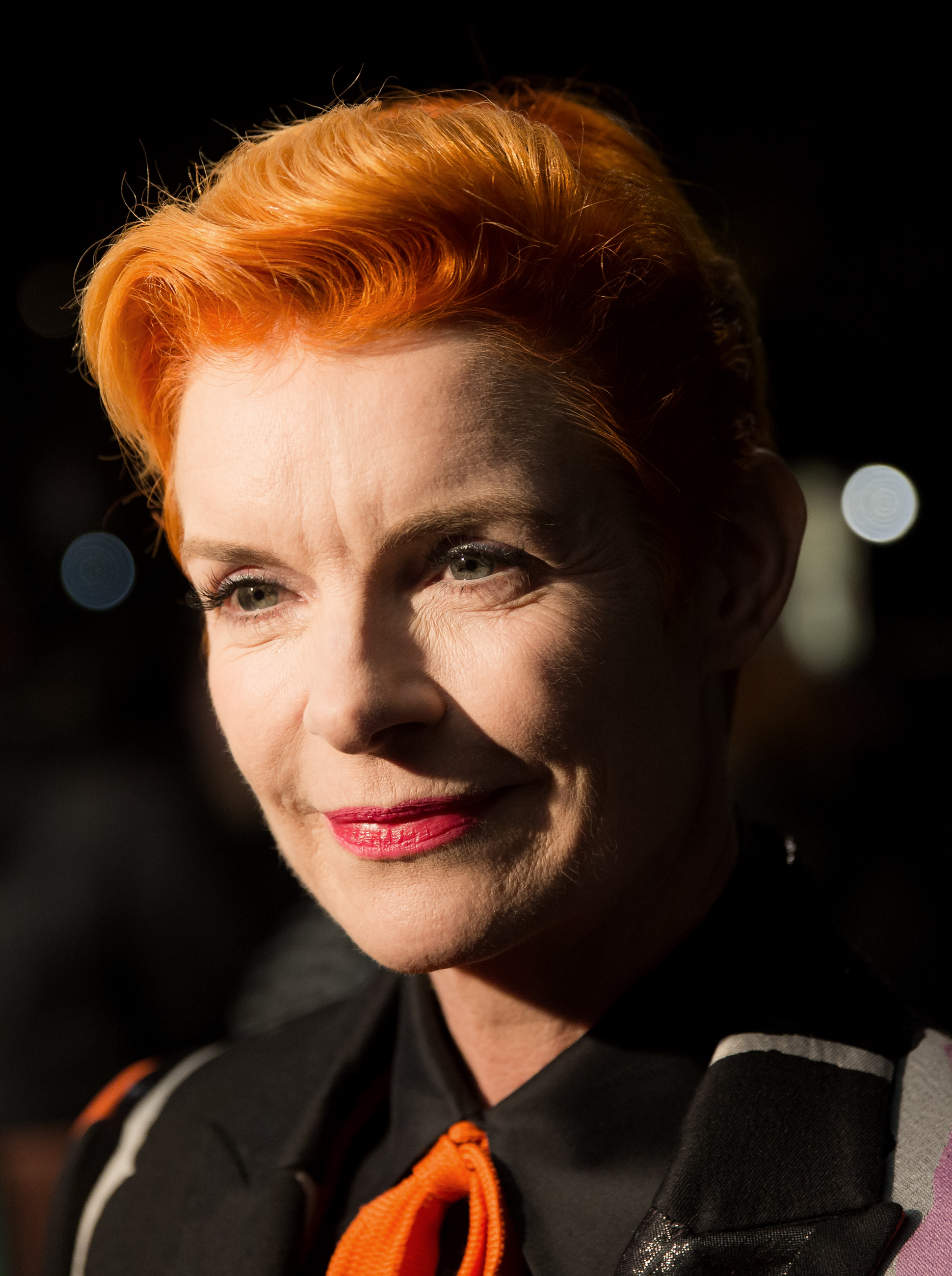
Sandy Powell, Best Costume Design winner

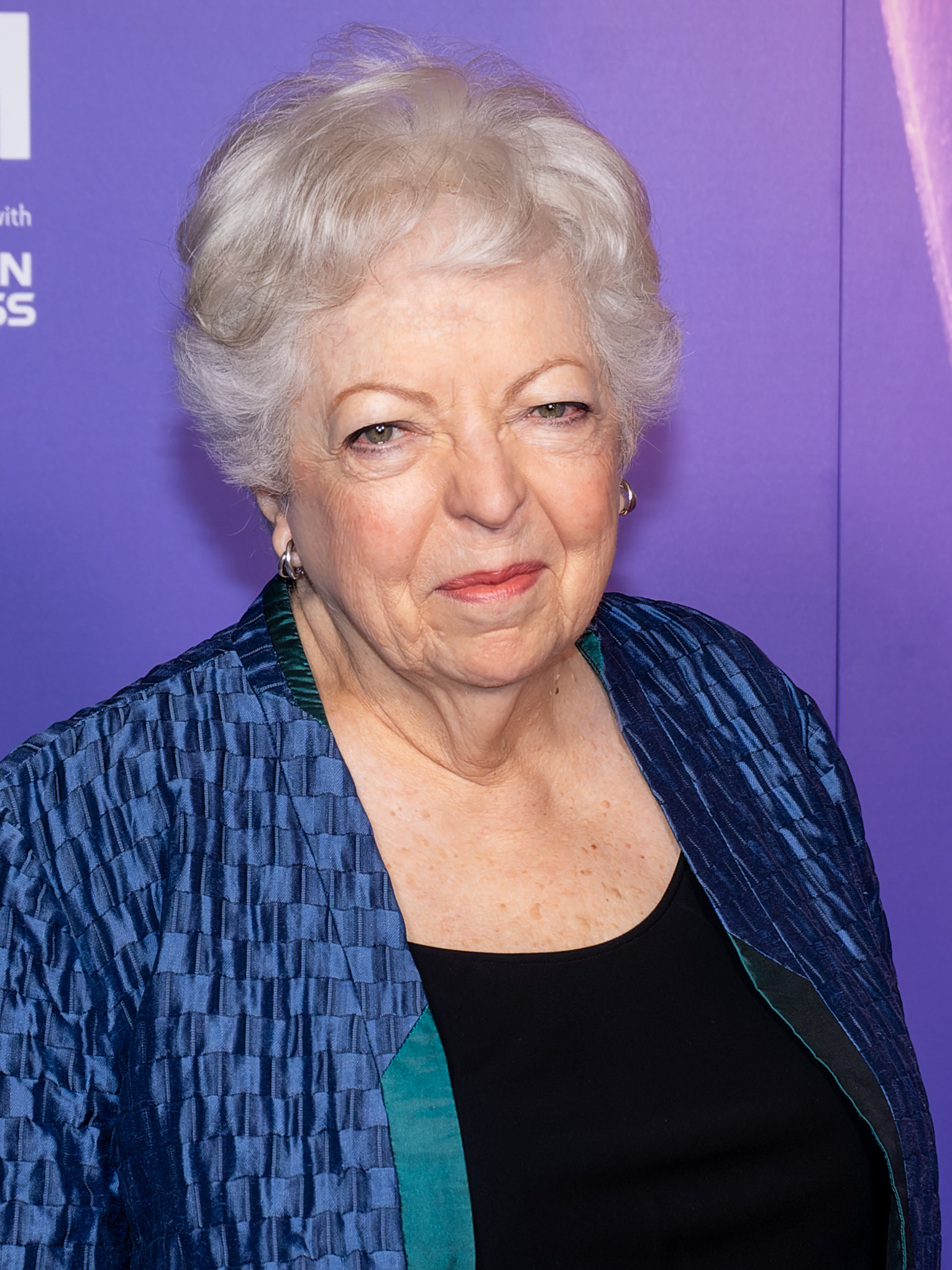
Thelma Schoonmaker, Best Film Editing winner

Winners are listed first, highlighted in boldface, and indicated with a double dagger (‡).

**Best Picture**: **Million Dollar Baby – Clint Eastwood, Albert S. Ruddy and Tom Rosenberg, producers**‡; The Aviator – Michael Mann and Graham King, producers; Finding Neverland – Richard N. Gladstein and Nellie Bellflower, producers; Ray – Taylor Hackford, Stuart Benjamin and Howard Baldwin, producers; Sideways – Michael London, producer	**Best Directing**: **Clint Eastwood – Million Dollar Baby**‡; Martin Scorsese – The Aviator; Taylor Hackford – Ray; Alexander Payne – Sideways; Mike Leigh – Vera Drake
**Best Actor in a Leading Role**: **Jamie Foxx – Ray as Ray Charles**‡; Don Cheadle – Hotel Rwanda as Paul Rusesabagina; Johnny Depp – Finding Neverland as J. M. Barrie; Leonardo DiCaprio – The Aviator as Howard Hughes; Clint Eastwood – Million Dollar Baby as Frankie Dunn	**Best Actress in a Leading Role**: **Hilary Swank – Million Dollar Baby as Margaret "Maggie" Fitzgerald**‡; Annette Bening – Being Julia as Julia Lambert; Catalina Sandino Moreno – Maria Full of Grace as María Álvarez; Imelda Staunton – Vera Drake as Vera Rose Drake; Kate Winslet – Eternal Sunshine of the Spotless Mind as Clementine Kruczynski
**Best Actor in a Supporting Role**: **Morgan Freeman – Million Dollar Baby as Eddie "Scrap-Iron" Dupris**‡; Alan Alda – The Aviator as Owen Brewster; Thomas Haden Church – Sideways as Jack Cole; Jamie Foxx – Collateral as Max Durocher; Clive Owen – Closer as Larry Gray	**Best Actress in a Supporting Role**: **Cate Blanchett – The Aviator as Katharine Hepburn**‡; Laura Linney – Kinsey as Clara McMillen; Virginia Madsen – Sideways as Maya Randall; Sophie Okonedo – Hotel Rwanda as Tatiana Rusesabagina; Natalie Portman – Closer as Alice Ayres/Jane Jones
**Best Writing (Original Screenplay)**: **Eternal Sunshine of the Spotless Mind – Screenplay by Charlie Kaufman; Story by Charlie Kaufman, Michel Gondry and Pierre Bismuth**‡; The Aviator – John Logan; Hotel Rwanda – Terry George and Keir Pearson; The Incredibles – Brad Bird; Vera Drake – Mike Leigh	**Best Writing (Adapted Screenplay)**: **Sideways – Alexander Payne and Jim Taylor based on the novel by Rex Pickett**‡; Before Sunset – Screenplay by Richard Linklater, Julie Delpy and Ethan Hawke; Story by Richard Linklater and Kim Krizan based on characters created by Richard Linklater and Kim Krizan for the film Before Sunrise; Finding Neverland – David Magee based on the play The Man Who Was Peter Pan by Allan Knee; Million Dollar Baby – Paul Haggis based on stories from Rope Burns: Stories from the Corner by F.X. Toole; The Motorcycle Diaries – José Rivera based on the books Con el Che por America Latina by Alberto Granado and The Motorcycle Diaries by Che Guevara
**Best Animated Feature Film**: **The Incredibles – Brad Bird**‡; Shark Tale – Bill Damaschke; Shrek 2 – Andrew Adamson	**Best Foreign Language Film**: **The Sea Inside (Spain) in Spanish, Catalan and Galician – Alejandro Amenábar**‡; As It Is in Heaven (Sweden) in Swedish – Kay Pollak; The Chorus (France) in French – Christophe Barratier; Downfall (Germany) in German – Oliver Hirschbiegel; Yesterday (South Africa) in Zulu – Darrell Roodt
**Best Documentary (Feature)**: **Born into Brothels: Calcutta's Red Light Kids – Ross Kauffman and Zana Briski**‡; The Story of the Weeping Camel – Luigi Falorni and Byambasuren Davaa; Super Size Me – Morgan Spurlock; Tupac: Resurrection – Lauren Lazin and Karolyn Ali; Twist of Faith – Kirby Dick and Eddie Schmidt	**Best Documentary (Short Subject)**: **Mighty Times: The Children's March – Robert Hudson and Robert Houston**‡; Autism Is a World – Gerardine Wurzburg; The Children of Leningradsky – Hanna Polak and Andrzej Celiński; Hardwood – Hubert Davis and Erin Faith Young; Sister Rose's Passion – Oren Jacoby and Steve Kalafer
**Best Short Film (Live Action)**: **Wasp – Andrea Arnold**‡; 7:35 in the Morning – Nacho Vigalondo; Everything in This Country Must – Gary McKendry; Little Terrorist – Ashvin Kumar; Two Cars, One Night – Taika Waititi and Ainsley Gardiner	**Best Short Film (Animated)**: **Ryan – Chris Landreth**‡; Birthday Boy – Sejong Park and Andrew Gregory; Gopher Broke – Jeff Fowler and Tim Miller; Guard Dog – Bill Plympton; Lorenzo – Mike Gabriel and Baker Bloodworth
**Best Music (Original Score)**: **Finding Neverland – Jan A. P. Kaczmarek**‡; Harry Potter and the Prisoner of Azkaban – John Williams; Lemony Snicket's A Series of Unfortunate Events – Thomas Newman; The Passion of the Christ – John Debney; The Village – James Newton Howard	**Best Music (Original Song)**: **"Al otro lado del río" from The Motorcycle Diaries – Music and Lyrics by Jorge Drexler**‡; "Accidentally in Love" from Shrek 2 – Music by Adam Duritz, Charlie Gillingham, Jim Bogios, David Immerglück, Matthew Malley and David Bryson; Lyrics by Adam Duritz and Dan Vickrey; "Believe" from The Polar Express – Music and Lyrics by Glen Ballard and Alan Silvestri; "Learn to Be Lonely" from The Phantom of the Opera – Music by Andrew Lloyd Webber; Lyrics by Charles Hart; "Look to Your Path (Vois sur ton chemin)" from The Chorus – Music by Bruno Coulais; Lyrics by Christophe Barratier
**Best Sound Editing**: **The Incredibles – Randy Thom and Michael Silvers**‡; The Polar Express – Randy Thom and Dennis Leonard; Spider-Man 2 – Paul N. J. Ottosson	**Best Sound Mixing**: **Ray – Scott Millan, Greg Orloff, Bob Beemer and Steve Cantamessa**‡; The Aviator – Tom Fleischman and Petur Hliddal; The Incredibles – Randy Thom, Gary A. Rizzo and Doc Kane; The Polar Express – Randy Thom, Tom Johnson, Dennis S. Sands and William B. Kaplan; Spider-Man 2 – Kevin O'Connell, Greg P. Russell, Jeffrey J. Haboush and Joseph Geisinger
**Best Art Direction**: **The Aviator – Art Direction: Dante Ferretti; Set Decoration: Francesca Lo Schiavo**‡; Finding Neverland – Art Direction: Gemma Jackson; Set Decoration: Trisha Edwards; Lemony Snicket's A Series of Unfortunate Events – Art Direction: Rick Heinrichs; Set Decoration: Cheryl Carasik; The Phantom of the Opera – Art Direction: Anthony Pratt; Set Decoration: Celia Bobak; A Very Long Engagement – Art Direction: Aline Bonetto	**Best Cinematography**: **The Aviator – Robert Richardson**‡; House of Flying Daggers – Zhao Xiaoding; The Passion of the Christ – Caleb Deschanel; The Phantom of the Opera – John Mathieson; A Very Long Engagement – Bruno Delbonnel
**Best Makeup**: **Lemony Snicket's A Series of Unfortunate Events – Valli O'Reilly and Bill Corso**‡; The Passion of the Christ – Keith VanderLaan and Christien Tinsley; The Sea Inside – Jo Allen and Manuel García	**Best Costume Design**: **The Aviator – Sandy Powell**‡; Finding Neverland – Alexandra Byrne; Lemony Snicket's A Series of Unfortunate Events – Colleen Atwood; Ray – Sharen Davis; Troy – Bob Ringwood
**Best Film Editing**: **The Aviator – Thelma Schoonmaker**‡; Collateral – Jim Miller and Paul Rubell; Finding Neverland – Matt Chessé; Million Dollar Baby – Joel Cox; Ray – Paul Hirsch	**Best Visual Effects**: **Spider-Man 2 – John Dykstra, Scott Stokdyk, Anthony LaMolinara and John Frazier**‡; Harry Potter and the Prisoner of Azkaban – Roger Guyett, Tim Burke, John Richardson and Bill George; I, Robot – John Nelson, Andrew R. Jones, Erik Nash and Joe Letteri

=== Honorary Award ===
- To Sidney Lumet in recognition of his brilliant services to screenwriters, performers and the art of the motion picture.

=== Jean Hersholt Humanitarian Award ===
- Roger Mayer

=== Films with multiple nominations and awards ===
The following 22 films received multiple nominations:

Nominations	Film
11	The Aviator
7	Finding Neverland
7	Million Dollar Baby
6	Ray
5	Sideways
4	The Incredibles
4	Lemony Snicket's A Series of Unfortunate Events
3	Hotel Rwanda
3	The Passion of the Christ
3	The Phantom of the Opera
3	The Polar Express
3	Spider-Man 2
3	Vera Drake
2	The Chorus
2	Closer
2	Collateral
2	Eternal Sunshine of the Spotless Mind
2	Harry Potter and the Prisoner of Azkaban
2	The Motorcycle Diaries
2	The Sea Inside
2	Shrek 2
2	A Very Long Engagement

The following four films received multiple awards:

Awards	Film
5	The Aviator
4	Million Dollar Baby
2	The Incredibles
2	Ray

== Presenters and performers ==
The following individuals, listed in order of appearance, presented awards or performed musical numbers.

=== Presenters ===
List of presenters
Name(s)	Role
Randy Thomas	Announcer for the 77th annual Academy Awards
Halle Berry	Presenter of the award for Best Art Direction
Renée Zellweger	Presenter of the award for Best Supporting Actor
Robin Williams	Presenter of the award for Best Animated Feature Film
Cate Blanchett	Presenter of the award for Best Makeup
Drew Barrymore	Introducer of the performance of Best Original Song nominee "Look To Your Path (Vois Sur Ton Chemin)"
Scarlett Johansson	Presenter of the Academy Awards for Technical Achievement and the Gordon E. Sawyer Award
Pierce Brosnan; Edna Mode	Presentation of the award for Best Costume Design
Tim Robbins	Presenter of the award for Best Supporting Actress
Chris Rock	Presenter of the tribute to Johnny Carson
Leonardo DiCaprio	Presenter of the award for Best Documentary Feature
Orlando Bloom; Kirsten Dunst	Presenters of the award for Best Film Editing
Mike Myers	Introducer of the performance of Best Original Song nominee "Accidentally in Love"
Adam Sandler	Presenter of the award for Best Adapted Screenplay
Jake Gyllenhaal; Ziyi Zhang	Presenters of the award for Best Visual Effects
Frank Pierson	Introducer of presenter Al Pacino
Al Pacino	Presenter of the Academy Honorary Award to Sidney Lumet
Emmy Rossum	Introducer of the performance of Best Original Song nominee "Learn to Be Lonely"
Jeremy Irons	Presenter of the award for Best Live Action Short Film
Laura Linney	Presenter of the award for Best Animated Short Film
Kate Winslet	Presenter of the award for Best Cinematography
Penélope Cruz; Salma Hayek	Presenters of the awards for Best Sound Mixing and Best Sound Editing
Salma Hayek	Introducer of the performance of Best Original Song nominee "Al otro lado del río"
Natalie Portman	Presenter of the award for Best Documentary Short
John Travolta	Presenter of the award for Best Original Score
Martin Scorsese	Presenter of the Jean Hersholt Humanitarian Award to Roger Mayer
Annette Bening	Presenter of the "In Memoriam" tribute
Sean Combs	Introducer of the performance of Best Original Song nominee "Believe"
Prince	Presenter of the award for Best Original Song
Sean Penn	Presenter of the award for Best Actress
Gwyneth Paltrow	Presenter of the award for Best Foreign Language Film
Samuel L. Jackson	Presenter of the award for Best Original Screenplay
Charlize Theron	Presenter of the award for Best Actor
Julia Roberts	Presenter of the award for Best Director
Dustin Hoffman; Barbra Streisand	Presenters of the award for Best Picture

=== Performers ===
Performers at the awards ceremony
Name(s)	Role	Performed
Bill Conti	Musical Arranger and Conductor	Orchestral
American Boychoir; Beyoncé	Performers	"Vois sur ton chemin (Look to Your Path)" from The Chorus
Counting Crows	Performers	"Accidentally in Love" from Shrek 2
Beyoncé	Performer	"Learn to Be Lonely" from The Phantom of the Opera
Antonio Banderas; Carlos Santana	Performers	"Al otro lado del rio" from The Motorcycle Diaries
Yo-Yo Ma	Performer	Performed musical selection during the "In Memoriam" tribute
Josh Groban; Beyoncé	Performers	"Believe" from The Polar Express

== Ceremony information ==
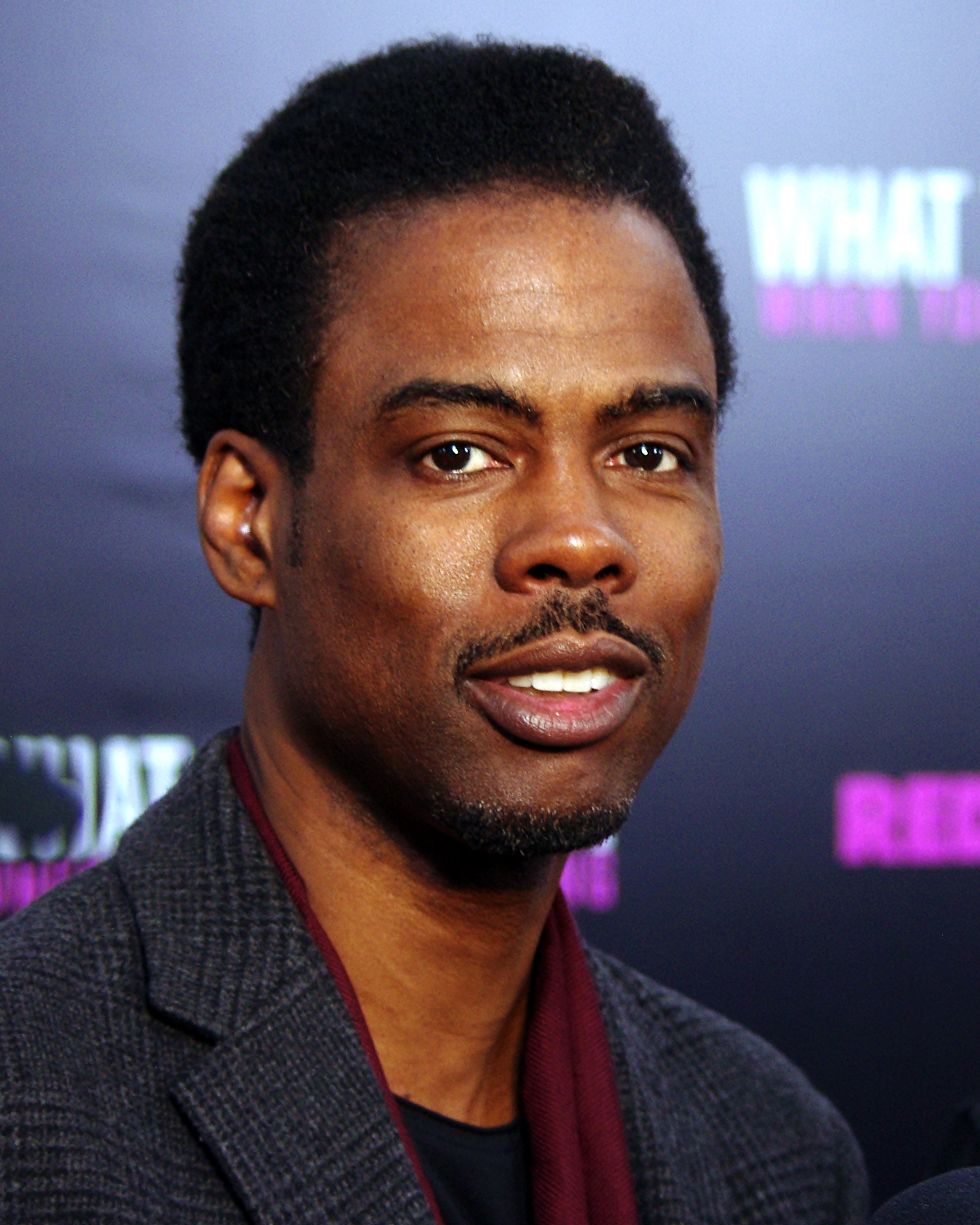
Chris Rock hosted the 77th Academy Awards

Opting for a younger face in an attempt to increase viewership, while renewing interest with the nominated films, producer Gil Cates selected actor and comedian Chris Rock to host the 2005 ceremony. Cates explained his decision to hire Rock for the telecast in a press release saying, "I am a huge fan of Chris Rock. He always makes me laugh and he always has something interesting to say. Chris represents the best of the new generation of comics. Having him host the Oscars is terrific. I can't wait." By virtue of his selection, Rock became the first African American man to solo host the gala.

Nearly a month before the ceremony Rock told Josh Wolk of Entertainment Weekly, "Come on, it's a fashion show. No one performs; it's not like a music show. What straight black man sits there and watches the Oscars? Show me one." Political blogger Matt Drudge later reported that several anonymous AMPAS members wanted Rock fired from his hosting job as a result of the comments. Nevertheless, producer Cates issued a statement defending the host saying, "Chris' comments are meant to be humorous digs at a show that some people, obviously including Chris himself, think may be a bit too stuffy." Furthermore, Wolk dismissed any controversy regarding Rock's comments and that Drudge exaggerated the host's comments. GLAAD Executive Director Joan Garry also issue a statement in light of the controversy stating, "Chris Rock isn't making fun of gays – he's poking fun at the Oscars." Rock appeared on The Tonight Show with Jay Leno the Monday before the ceremony to clarify his comments. When Leno asked about the statement, Rock replied "I did not say that. I said only gay people watch the Tonys." However, he reiterated, "I really don't know any straight men who aren't in show business that have ever watched the Oscars."

Notable changes were made to give the ceremony a sleek, interactive look while shortening the length of the ceremony. Cates announced that in certain categories, all five nominees would be up onstage prior to the announcement of the award. In other instances, the actor or actress would present the award in the audience. In addition, production designer Roy Christopher designed a technologically ambitious stage for the telecast that both saluted the past while look toward the future. The set prominently featured 26 high-definition video monitors floating over the first twelve rows of the audience and a 40-foot LED screen situated beneath a layer of plexiglass on the stage floor. Both screens were used display images of previous Oscar appearances as presenters took the stage or random film clips during several commercial breaks. A gold rod featuring 23 different life-sized Oscar statuettes spiraling upward was placed at center stage.

Several other people were involved with the production of the ceremony. Film composer and musician Bill Conti served as musical director of the ceremony. AMPAS graphics designer Brett Davidson designed the official ceremony poster consisting of a profile of the Oscar statuette in front of four neon-colored squares. Freelance producer Cochise and media firm Dig and Media Island released a trailer shown in movie theaters nationwide promoting the ceremony featuring clips from past Oscar ceremonies against the four squares backdrop in the aforementioned poster. The trailer featured the song "Hey Mama" by The Black Eyed Peas. Two-time Oscar-winning actor Dustin Hoffman narrated the opening montage highlighting the evolution of the movies.

=== Box office performance of nominated films ===
When the nominations were announced on January 25, the field of Best Picture nominees did not include a bona fide blockbuster at the U.S. box office. It was the first time since 1986 that none of the five films in that category were among the top ten releases in box office prior to the nominations announcement. Furthermore, before the ceremony, all five films sold the lowest cumulative number of tickets sold since 1984. Ray was the highest-grossing film among the Best Picture nominees with $73 million in domestic box office receipts. The film was followed by The Aviator ($58.4 million), Finding Neverland ($32.7 million), Sideways ($32.4 million), and finally Million Dollar Baby ($8.4 million). The combined gross of the five Best Picture nominees when the Oscars were announced was $205 million with an average gross of $41.3 million per film.

Among the rest of the top 50 releases of 2004 in U.S. box office before the nominations, 44 nominations went to 14 films on the list. Only Shrek 2 (1st), The Incredibles (4th), Shark Tale (11th), Collateral (22nd), Ray (37th), and The Aviator (49th) were nominated for Best Picture, Best Animated Feature, directing, acting, or screenwriting. The other top 50 box office hits that earned the nominations were Spider-Man 2 (2nd), The Passion of the Christ (3rd), Harry Potter and the Prisoner of Azkaban (5th), The Polar Express (10th), I, Robot (12th), Troy (13th), Lemony Snicket's A Series of Unfortunate Events (18th), and The Village (20th).

=== Jude Law joke ===
During his monologue, host Rock joked, "Clint Eastwood's a star, OK? Tobey Maguire's just a boy in tights," He also added, "You want Tom Cruise and all you can get is Jude Law? Wait. You want Russell Crowe and all you can get is Colin Farrell? Wait. Alexander is not Gladiator." In response, Sean Penn rebutted Rock's remarks praising Law as one of his generation's "finest actors". Over a year later, Law expressed his anger toward Rock in The New York Times telling columnist Craig Modderno, "At first I laughed because I didn't think he knew who I was. Then I got angry as his remarks became personal. My friends were livid. It's unfortunate I had five or six films come out at the same time."

=== Scrapped Robin Williams song ===
Robin Williams initially wanted to sing a humorous song written by Marc Shaiman and Scott Wittman during the presentation of the Best Animated Feature award satirizing the controversy regarding Focus on the Family and a music video sponsored by We Are Family Foundation featuring animated characters such as SpongeBob SquarePants singing the song "We Are Family". The song contained lyrics such as "Pinocchio's had his nose done! Sleeping Beauty is popping pills!/ The Three Little Pigs ain't kosher! Betty Boop works Beverly Hills!" However, Cates and ABC officials deemed the song overly vulgar and offensive for the telecast and was dropped altogether after writers Shaiman and Wittman had trouble rewriting more appropriate lyrics. Williams eventually presented the Best Animated Feature award as scheduled, but silently mocked the debacle by entering the stage with duct tape over his mouth before speaking.

=== Critical reviews ===
The show received a mixed reception from media publications. Some media outlets were more critical of the show and Rock's performance as host. USA Today television critic Robert Bianco wrote, "Loud, snide and dismissive, he wasn't just a disappointment; he ranks up there with the worst hosts ever." He also called the decision to have several nominees of several technical categories stand on stage embarrassing and disrespectful. Columnist Robert. P. Lawrence of the San Diego Union Tribune commented, "It was a frustratingly average, three-hour-12-minute exhibition of mutual admiration in the inimitable Hollywood style." He later said that despite Rock's edgy and provocative opening, his humor and energy diminished as the night wore on. Vince Horiuchi of The Salt Lake Tribune wrote of Rock's performance, "He was bound by stale jokes (none of the winners "tested positive for steroids"), a rigid opening monologue (he didn't even make reference to his prior controversial comments about the Oscars), and tired comedy bits (Rock playing like Catherine Zeta-Jones with Adam Sandler)." He also described the cast and production of the ceremony as "moribund" and "clumsy".

Other media outlets received the broadcast more positively. Film critic Roger Ebert noted that Rock "opened on a high-energy quick-talking note" He also added, "Chris Rock hit a home run with his opening monologue, which was surprisingly pointed, topical, and not shy of controversy." Television critic Frazier Moore commented that Rock's performance was a "needed pick-me-up, presiding over the broadcast with saucy finesse." He added, "In sum, the broadcast felt brisk, though not rushed. It felt modern and refreshingly free of chronic self-importance." Brian Lowry of Variety gave an average review of Rock but remarked, "For all the hand-wringing about the awards descending into the muck, the 77th Academy Awards proved a classy affair, with precious little red meat to satiate Hollywood bashers."

=== Ratings and reception ===
The American telecast on ABC drew an average of 42.14 million people over its length, which was a 3% decrease from the previous year's ceremony. The show also drew lower Nielsen ratings compared to the two previous ceremonies with 25.4 of households watching over a 38 share.

== "In Memoriam" ==
The annual "In Memoriam" tribute was presented by actress Annette Bening. Musician Yo-Yo Ma performed during the segment.

- Ronald Reagan – Actor
- Peter Ustinov – Actor
- Carrie Snodgress – Actress
- Dan Petrie Sr. – Director
- David Raksin – Composer
- Fay Wray – Actress
- Phil Gersh – Agent
- Elmer Bernstein – Composer
- Carole Eastman – Writer
- Frank Thomas – Animator
- Russ Meyer – Director
- Jerry Orbach – Actor, singer
- Ralph E. Winters – Editor
- Robert E. Thompson – Writer
- Howard Keel – Actor, singer
- Janet Leigh – Actress
- Christopher Reeve – Actor
- Ossie Davis – Actor
- Jerry Bick – Producer
- Mercedes McCambridge – Actress
- William Sackheim – Writer, producer
- Ed DiGiulio – Inventor
- Nelson Gidding – Writer
- Paul Winfield – Actor
- Philippe de Broca – Director
- Jerry Goldsmith – Composer
- Rodney Dangerfield – Stand-up-comic, actor
- Virginia Mayo – Actress
- Tony Randall – Actor, comedian
- Marlon Brando – Actor

A special tribute to five-time host Johnny Carson was presented by host Chris Rock with previous presenter Whoopi Goldberg discussing Carson's legacy to television and the Academy Awards in the segment. Later on in the broadcast, Best Actor winner Jamie Foxx briefly eulogized singer and musician Ray Charles, who died in June 2004, during his acceptance speech.

== See also ==
- 11th Screen Actors Guild Awards
- 25th Golden Raspberry Awards
- 47th Grammy Awards
- 57th Primetime Emmy Awards
- 58th British Academy Film Awards
- 59th Tony Awards
- 62nd Golden Globe Awards
- List of submissions to the 77th Academy Awards for Best Foreign Language Film

== Bibliography ==
- Crouse, Richard (2005). Reel Winners: Movie Award Trivia. Toronto, Canada: University of Toronto Press. ISBN 1-55002-574-0.
- Osborne, Robert (2008). 80 Years of the Oscar: The Complete History of the Academy Awards. New York, United States: Abbeville Publishing Group. ISBN 978-0-7892-0992-4.
- Todd, Anne M. (2008). Jamie Foxx. New York, United States: Chelsea House Publishers. ISBN 978-1-60413-000-3.
- Terrance, Vincent (2013). Television Specials: 5,336 Entertainment Programs, 1936–2012 (2nd ed.). Jefferson, North Carolina, United States: McFarland & Company. ISBN 978-0-7864-7444-8.
