= Grant L. Roberts =

Canadian actor and bodybuilder

Grant Roberts is a former Mr. World Canada bodybuilding champion, and is a personal trainer, nutritionist, lifestyle coach, actor, author and philanthropist. Roberts was born in Toronto, Ontario, Canada, and is also a citizen of Ireland. He currently resides in Canada and the United States.

== Career ==
=== Personal trainer ===
Roberts career gained international recognition for his work in transforming the physique of actress Hilary Swank in the Clint Eastwood film Million Dollar Baby (2004). Swank went on to win both the Golden Globe and Academy Award for Best Actress and paid tribute to Roberts on both occasions, acknowledging his contribution.

Roberts also was the personal trainer of Kumail Nanjiani, who had decided to go all in for a major makeover for his role in Marvel superhero film Eternals.

=== Films ===
Roberts had a cameo appearance in the film Million Dollar Baby, as the corner-man for actress and real-life professional world champion Lucia Rijker, who played the 140 champion 'Billie the Blue Bear' in the movie.

Roberts would team up again with Clint Eastwood and Morgan Freeman in the 2009 film Invictus, playing Ruben Kruger, a flanker for the South Africa national team that won the 1995 Rugby World Cup.

Roberts was cast as Johnny, a mobster tasked with finding Frankie Valli's daughter Francine and delivering her to her father, in the Warner Brothers film Jersey Boys.

Roberts was cast in the film Sully, starring Tom Hanks, which tells the story of the successful emergency water landing of US Airways Flight 1549 on the Hudson River. Roberts was cast in the role of the lead waiter who plucks the passengers off the aircraft.

=== Health activism ===
Roberts is actively involved in charitable work, founding www.healthystudentbodies.com an organization dedicated to educating, motivating and creating healthy invigorating lifestyle for all students of life regardless of age. Roberts’ foundation provides fitness equipment to schools and fitness programming including 'Jog Your Memory' a science-based pre-educational primer that enhances oxygen and blood flow to the brain enhancing focus, retention and cognition with the additional benefit of aiding in controlling excess body fat.

Roberts is the chairman and director of Healthy and Fit Communities, a global initiative that provides web based tools and actively encourages comprehensive fitness strategies using Roberts' ten www.UnifiedLifestyle.com principles as the foundation for improving appearance, strength, confidence and overall level of fitness regardless of age, gender of athletic ability.

The Initial City, led by Mayor Mick Cornett of Oklahoma City, featured on The Ellen DeGeneres Show, has proven to be an inspiration for other communities as the list of participating cities continues to grow.
