= Peter Greenwood =

Australian special effects technician (1962–2021)

Peter J. Greenwood
- Born: October 17, 1962; Sydney, Australia
- Died: January 7, 2021 (aged 58); Colorado Springs, Colorado, U.S.
- Occupations: Special effects technician; researcher; designer; voice actor; media consultant
- Spouse: Gay Lynn Ramey (m. 2015)

Peter J. Greenwood (17 October 1962 – 7 January 2021) was an Australian special effects technician, researcher, designer, voice actor and media consultant.

He was related to actress Joan Greenwood.

== Career ==
He attended Killara High School in Sydney, NSW.

He began his career as a cel painter with Hanna Barbera Australia at age fifteen, followed by a stint on Sydney radio station 2UW on the Rick Melbourne morning comedy radio show Wood Duck Theatre. As a commercial actor, he appeared in minor roles in several Australian TV soap operas. He also worked on various advertising campaigns, and was perhaps best known in Australia as the spokesperson for the Matchbox die cast car brand Parasites.

He has also written for magazines published by the Fairfax group, including Omega Science Digest, Woman's Day and TV Soap magazine. He also produced several special-issue magazines for the Howitz group, such as issues focused on The Addams Family vs. The Munsters; The Simpsons; Paul Hogan; and James Dean. His name appears as "Hollywood editor" on these special editions.

During the 1980s, he worked as a licensing designer/consultant for Hanna Barbera Australia, Reg Grundy Productions and Village Roadshow, before moving to Los Angeles, where he worked in the merchandising and promotions field.

In 1992, he was the supervising producer on the American adaptation of the British sci-fi comedy series Red Dwarf, under executive producer Linwood Boomer (creator of Malcolm in the Middle). During 1993, he worked as a costume and special effects technician on an episode of Star Trek: Deep Space Nine and on the movie Teenage Mutant Ninja Turtles III.

From 2006, Greenwood was the worldwide licensing manager for Jack Chertok Television. He was recently quoted by the Los Angeles Times regarding his search for and restoration of the Chertok show My Living Doll. Greenwood continued to search for this program in order to issue a second volume in 2013.

He supervised the recent merchandising reactivation of the show My Favorite Martian. His name can be found on the side panel of the Pegasus hobbies kit of Uncle Martin's space ship and the Factory Entertainment Bobble collection.

Consulting to the Milton Caniff estate, he can be found credited in the Hermes Press reprints of the Gold Key Steve Canyon books and the Mail Call art book. In the Hermes Press My Favorite Martian volume one comic reprint, he is listed as the visual editor.

For home video, he oversaw the 2012 DVD extras footage for Alias Smith and Jones, Laramie, Wagon Train, and 87th Precinct.

In 2012, he oversaw the special reprint of a Gold Key My Favorite Martian title together with Hermes Press as part of the Free Comic Book Day event across the United States. This was the first 1960s television show to become part of this event.

In 2013, he became the worldwide licensing manager for Anderson Entertainment and oversaw several new products, starting with Dick Spanner.

He was also the driving force behind a new push for the Anderson company to return to puppet production, which was slated to begin in 2015 with a new British version of Firestorm, which was previously produced as an anime.

Further credits can be found in Keith Scott's book The Mouse That Roared and the recent Brady Bunch history book. All of this made him a sought after consultant for older television projects, and as such could be found quoted heavily in the third volume of the Star Trek history These Are The Voyages by Marc Cushman.

As an actor, he had voiced a wide range of characters. In his native Australia he was known as a voice over artist for American accented work, having provided tracks for Virgin Games and Victorinox Swiss army knives, the latter of which was nominated for an Australian Clio Award for radio.

On screen, he was mostly seen as a baby faced heavy on several soap operas, from The Young Doctors to The Restless Years for the Australian production company Reg Grundy Productions.

His first US based voice work was on the Art Clokey-produced Gumby adventures remake from 1986–87, where he voiced over twenty characters and provided script elements for the Australian themed episode "Kangaroo Express", in which he voiced all the Australian characters. He also created and painted many of the miniature props seen in that episode.

The next Australian themed project was Walt Disney's The Rescuers Down Under, where he provided the voice of the radio announcer and airplane captain and again ad-libbed the first lines of Australian dialogue heard in this film as the Cody character runs past the kitchen.

From that point, Greenwood provided looping services for Saban's Power Rangers, Big Bad Beetleborgs, and Masked Rider.

His laugh and dialogue can be heard on the first installment of the Disney Pirates of the Caribbean franchise as crew voices for the Black Pearl.

== Credits ==
=== TV shows ===
- The Restless Years ... Thug (1979-1980)
- Bellamy
  - "The Axe Man Cometh" (1981) ... Thug
- Taurus Rising (1982) ... Grave Digger
- Prisoner
  - Episode 1.524 (1985) ... Photographer
- Rafferty's Rules ... Football Thug (1988)
- The King of Queens
  - "Furious Gorge" (2004) ... Support Group Chubby Guy (uncredited)
- Lucky Louie
  - "Kim's O" (2006) ... Tiny the Handyman
  - "A Mugging Story" (2006) ... Tiny (uncredited)

=== Voice work ===
- Home (1988) ... Johnny 5 (one episode)
- Gumby Adventures (1988) ... Gumby's uncle, cousin, outback man, and others
- The Rescuers Down Under (1990) ... Radio Announcer/Airplane Captain
- Big Bad Beetleborgs
  - "Say the Magic Word" (1996) ... Sword Warrior
  - "Haunted Hideout" (1996) ... Mace Warrior
- Power Rangers Turbo
  - "Cars Attacks" (1997) ... Wolfgang Amadeus Griller (uncredited)
- Power Rangers Lightspeed Rescue
  - "Neptune's Daughter" (2000) ... Aquafiend
