= Lorenzo (film) =

- Directed by: Mike Gabriel
- Written by: Mike Gabriel
- Story by: Mike Gabriel; Joe Grant
- Produced by: Baker Bloodworth
- Music by: Juan José Mosalini and Big Tango Orchestra
- Production company: Walt Disney Feature Animation
- Distributed by: Buena Vista Pictures Distribution
- Release dates: March 6, 2004 (Florida Film Festival); May 28, 2004 (with Raising Helen)
- Running time: 5 minutes
- Country: United States
- Language: English

Lorenzo is an American animated comedy short film produced by Walt Disney Feature Animation about a cat, Lorenzo, who is "dismayed to discover that his tail has developed a personality of its own". The short was directed by Mike Gabriel and produced by Baker Bloodworth. It premiered at the Florida Film Festival on March 6, 2004, and later appeared as a feature before the film Raising Helen, but it did not appear on the DVD release of the film. It is based on an original idea by Joe Grant, who started working on the film in 1949, but it was eventually shelved. It was later found along with Destino. The short was intended to be one of the segments for the proposed but ultimately abandoned Fantasia 2006. It was included on the Walt Disney Animation Studios Short Films Collection Blu-ray/DVD set released on August 18, 2015.

== Plot ==
A cat named Lorenzo lounges on a cushion. A black cat passes by, and Lorenzo can't help but express his glee that the stray is missing her tail. Lorenzo flaunts his own luxurious backside accessory and goads the cat with expansive displays of tailery. As Lorenzo laughs the black cat casts a hex, bringing Lorenzo's tail to energetic life. Lorenzo is little more than perturbed until the tail's incessant motion begins to take its toll. The pampered cat grows both exhausted and desperate, as it becomes apparent that even the most extreme measures (such as high voltage electrocution, drowning, and being run over by a train) will not quiet his tail. At junctures the black cat appears and offers Lorenzo a knife, her intentions clear. Lorenzo resists her just as strongly as he does his tail's advances. Lorenzo is however, finally driven to capitulate and severs his own glorious tail.

== Production ==
Lorenzo is based on an original idea by Disney artist and writer, Joe Grant. He came up with the idea after he saw his cat dive into the middle of a fight between his two poodles. He wondered, what if that cat lost its tail? Grant began developing Lorenzo in 1949. It was written, designed and directed by Mike Gabriel, in collaboration with Grant. Don Hahn suggested Gabriel to use tango music as an inspiration when conceptualizing the film. In search for a tango music, he went to a Virgin Megastore, where he spent $346 of his own money buying 40 tango CDs. The first song he listened to—"Bordoneo y 900", performed by Juan José Mosalini and his Big Tango Orchestra—secured his attention and became the song he chose for the production. For the final film's score, the creators hired Mosalini and Big Tango Orchestra, who recorded in France a new version of "Bordoneo y 900". Baker Bloodworth produced the film, along with Roy E. Disney and Don Hahn who served as executive producers. Gabriel hand painted all of the short's backgrounds with Tempera paint on a black construction paper. A painterly renderer called Sable, created by Daniel Teece, was used to create 3D brush strokes on the backgrounds. Traditional animation and clean-up were done at the Paris-based division of Walt Disney Feature Animation, while all painting, digital work, and post-production were performed at the Burbank studio.

The short was developed as a potential segment for Fantasia 2006, the third installment following Fantasia and Fantasia 2000. After several years of funding and staff cutbacks at Walt Disney Feature Animation, the project was shelved by November 2003. In addition to Lorenzo, two other potential shorts that could be included in Fantasia 2006 were also completed before the projects cancellation – Destino and One by One – and were subsequently released as individual short films.

== Awards ==
Lorenzo was nominated for the Academy Award for Best Animated Short Film at the 77th Academy Awards in 2005. The short won the 2005 Annie Award for Best Animated Short Subject. It was included in the Animation Show of Shows in 2004.
