= Million Dollar Baby =

2004 American sports drama film by Clint Eastwood

- Theatrical release poster
- Directed by: Clint Eastwood
- Screenplay by: Paul Haggis
- Based on: Stories from Rope Burns by F.X. Toole
- Produced by: Clint Eastwood; Albert S. Ruddy; Tom Rosenberg; Paul Haggis
- Starring: Clint Eastwood; Hilary Swank; Morgan Freeman
- Cinematography: Tom Stern
- Edited by: Joel Cox
- Music by: Clint Eastwood
- Production companies: Lakeshore Entertainment; Malpaso Productions; Ruddy Morgan Organization
- Distributed by: Warner Bros. Pictures (North America and South Africa); Lakeshore International (International)
- Release dates: December 5, 2004 (New York City); January 21, 2005 (United States)
- Running time: 132 minutes
- Country: United States
- Language: English
- Budget: $30 million
- Box office: $217 million

Million Dollar Baby is a 2004 American sports drama film directed, co-produced, scored by and starring Clint Eastwood from a screenplay by Paul Haggis. It is based on stories from the 2000 collection Rope Burns: Stories from the Corner by F.X. Toole, the pen name of fight manager and cutman Jerry Boyd, and also stars Hilary Swank and Morgan Freeman. The film follows Margaret "Maggie" Fitzgerald (Swank), an underdog amateur boxer who is helped by an underappreciated boxing trainer (Eastwood) to achieve her dream of becoming a professional.

Million Dollar Baby premiered in New York City on December 5, 2004, and was theatrically released on December 15, 2004, by Warner Bros. Pictures domestically, with Lakeshore Entertainment's international unit handling international sales. It received critical acclaim and was also a commercial success, grossing $217 million worldwide against a $30 million budget. The film garnered seven nominations at the 77th Academy Awards and won four: Best Picture, Best Director, Best Actress (for Swank), and Best Supporting Actor (for Freeman). The National Board of Review and the American Film Institute named Million Dollar Baby one of the top-ten films of 2004. It has since been cited as one of the best films of the 2000s, the 21st century and of all-time.

== Plot ==
Maggie Fitzgerald, a waitress from the Ozarks, enters the Hit Pit, a rundown boxing gym in Los Angeles operated by Frankie Dunn. Frankie is a cantankerous Irish-American trainer estranged from his daughter. Maggie asks Frankie to train her, but he refuses because he does not want to train women and believes Maggie is too old. Eddie "Scrap-Iron" Dupris, Frankie's friend and the gym's handyman, allows her to train at the Hit Pit regardless. Frankie's prize prospect, "Big Willie" Little, signs with rival manager Mickey Mack after becoming impatient with Frankie rejecting offers for a championship bout, so Maggie gets her chance.

With Frankie's coaching, Maggie fights her way up in the women's amateur boxing division. Since she has earned a reputation for quick knockouts, Frankie bribes managers to put their trainee fighters against her. Scrap, concerned when Frankie rejects several offers for big fights, arranges a meeting for Maggie with Mack, but out of loyalty to Frankie, she declines. Frankie bestows Maggie a Gaelic nickname embroidered on her boxing robe, Mo Cuishle, but does not tell her its meaning. The two travel to Europe as she continues to win. Maggie eventually saves enough of her winnings to buy her mother a house. Nevertheless, her mother berates Maggie for endangering her welfare checks, claiming everyone back home laughs at her.

Frankie is finally willing to arrange a title fight. He secures Maggie a $1 million match in Las Vegas against the WBA women's welterweight champion, Billie "The Blue Bear" Osterman, a German ex-prostitute who has a reputation as a dirty fighter. Maggie begins to dominate the fight, but Billie knocks her out with an illegal sucker punch from behind after the bell rings to end the round. Maggie lands hard on her corner stool, breaking her neck and leaving her a ventilator-dependent quadriplegic.

Frankie goes through the five stages of grief, seeking multiple doctors' opinions in denial, lashing out in anger at Scrap, and trying to bargain with God through prayer. He later apologizes to Scrap and blames himself for Maggie's injuries. Scrap tells him not to, as Maggie owes it to him for getting her shot at the world championship.

While in the hospital, Maggie looks forward to her family's visit. They arrive late, having first toured Disneyland and Universal Studios Hollywood. Accompanied by an attorney, their sole concern is getting Maggie's assets transferred to them. Disgusted, she orders them to leave and threatens to report their welfare fraud if they try to contact her again.

Maggie develops bedsores and undergoes an amputation for an infected leg. She asks Frankie to help her die, declaring that she has everything she wants out of life. A horrified Frankie refuses, so Maggie later bites her tongue in an attempt to bleed to death. Knowing the fatherly affection Frankie has developed for Maggie, Frankie's priest warns him that he will never find himself again if he goes through with Maggie's request. Frankie sneaks into the hospital one night, unaware that Scrap is watching from the shadows. Just before administering a fatal injection of adrenaline, he tells Maggie the meaning of "mo cuishle": "my darling, and my blood", then gives Maggie a final goodbye kiss. He leaves and retires from boxing altogether. After his retirement his whereabouts are unknown. Scrap writes to Frankie's daughter, informing her of her father's true character.

== Cast ==
- Clint Eastwood as Frankie Dunn, a gruff but well-meaning elderly boxing trainer
- Hilary Swank as Mary Margaret "Maggie" Fitzgerald, a determined, aspiring boxer trained by Frankie Dunn
- Morgan Freeman as Eddie "Scrap-Iron" Dupris, Dunn's gym assistant and former boxer
- Anthony Mackie as Shawrelle Berry, an overzealous boxer and frequent tenant of Dunn's gym
- Jay Baruchel as "Danger" Barch, a simpleton would-be boxer
- Mike Colter as Willie "Big Willie" Little, a boxer whom Dunn has trained for years
- Lucia Rijker as Billie "The Blue Bear" Osterman, a former prostitute and vicious boxer
- Brían F. O'Byrne as Father Horvak, the priest of the church which Dunn attends
- Margo Martindale as Earline Fitzgerald, Maggie's selfish mother
- Riki Lindhome as Mardell Fitzgerald, Maggie's welfare-cheating sister
- Michael Peña as Omar, a boxer and Shawrelle's best friend
- Bruce MacVittie as Mickey Mack
- Ned Eisenberg as Sally Mendoza
- Marcus Chait as J.D. Fitzgerald, Maggie's incarcerated brother
- Tom McCleister as Mr. Johnson, a lawyer
- Benito Martinez as Billie's Manager
- Grant L. Roberts as Billie's Cut Man
- Jude Ciccolella as Hogan
- Naveen Kanal as London Man

== Development and production ==
After being fired from the television series Family Law, Paul Haggis wrote the script on spec, and it took four years to sell it. The film was stuck in development hell for years before it was shot. Several studios rejected the project even when Clint Eastwood signed on as actor and director. Even Warner Bros., Eastwood's longtime home base, would not agree to a $30 million budget. Eastwood persuaded Lakeshore Entertainment's Tom Rosenberg to put up half the budget (as well as handle foreign distribution), with Warner Bros. contributing the rest. Eastwood shot the film in less than 40 days between June and July 2004. Filming took place in Los Angeles and film sets at Warner Bros. Studios. The titular phrase 'million dollar baby' was used as an insult during pre-fight publicity by Sonny Liston to Muhammad Ali, the latter of whom was an underdog at the time. Eastwood had his daughter Morgan Colette appear in a cameo as a girl who waves to Hilary Swank's character at a gas station.

Eastwood had confidence in Swank's acting, but upon seeing Swank's small physique, he had concerns, "I just thought, 'Yeah, this gal would be great. If we can get her trained up. If we can get a little bit more bulk on her, to make her look like a fighter'...She was like a feather. But what happened is, she had this great work ethic." Consequently, to prepare for her role, Swank underwent extensive training in the ring and weight room, gaining 19 pounds (8.6 kg) of muscle, aided by professional trainer Grant L. Roberts. She trained for nearly five hours every day, winding up with a potentially life-threatening staphylococcus infection out of blisters on her foot. She did not tell Eastwood about the infection because she thought it would be out of character for Maggie.

== Reception ==
=== Box office ===
Million Dollar Baby initially had a limited release, opening in eight theaters in December 2004. In its later wide release opening, the film earned $12,265,482 in North America and quickly became a box-office hit both domestically and internationally. It grossed $216,763,646 in theaters; $100,492,203 in the United States, and $116,271,443 in other territories. The film played in theaters for six and a half months.

=== Critical response ===
On Rotten Tomatoes, Million Dollar Baby has an approval rating of 90% based on 269 reviews, with an average rating of 8.40/10. The website's critical consensus reads, "Clint Eastwood's assured direction—combined with knockout performances from Hilary Swank and Morgan Freeman—help Million Dollar Baby to transcend its clichés, and the result is deeply heartfelt and moving." On Metacritic it has a weighted average score of 86 out of 100, based on reviews from 39 critics, indicating "universal acclaim". Audiences polled by CinemaScore gave the film a grade "A" on an A+ to F scale.

Roger Ebert of the Chicago Sun-Times gave the film four stars and stated that "Clint Eastwood's Million Dollar Baby is a masterpiece, pure and simple," listing it as the best film of 2004. Michael Medved stated: "My main objection to Million Dollar Baby always centered on its misleading marketing, and effort by Warner Brothers to sell it as a movie about a female Rocky, with barely a hint of the pitch-dark substance that led Andrew Sarris of the New York Observer...to declare that "no movie in my memory has depressed me more than Million Dollar Baby."

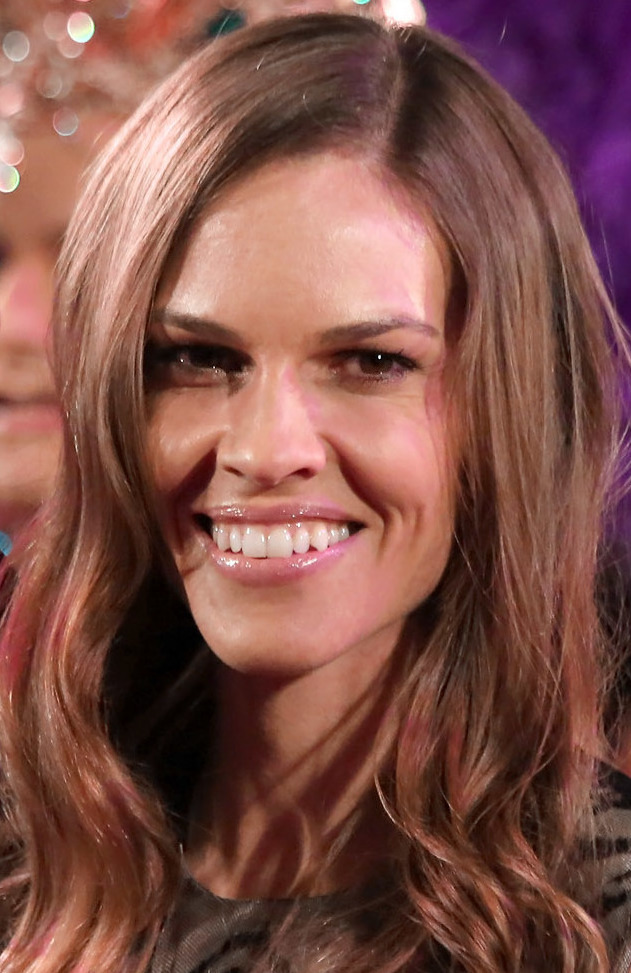
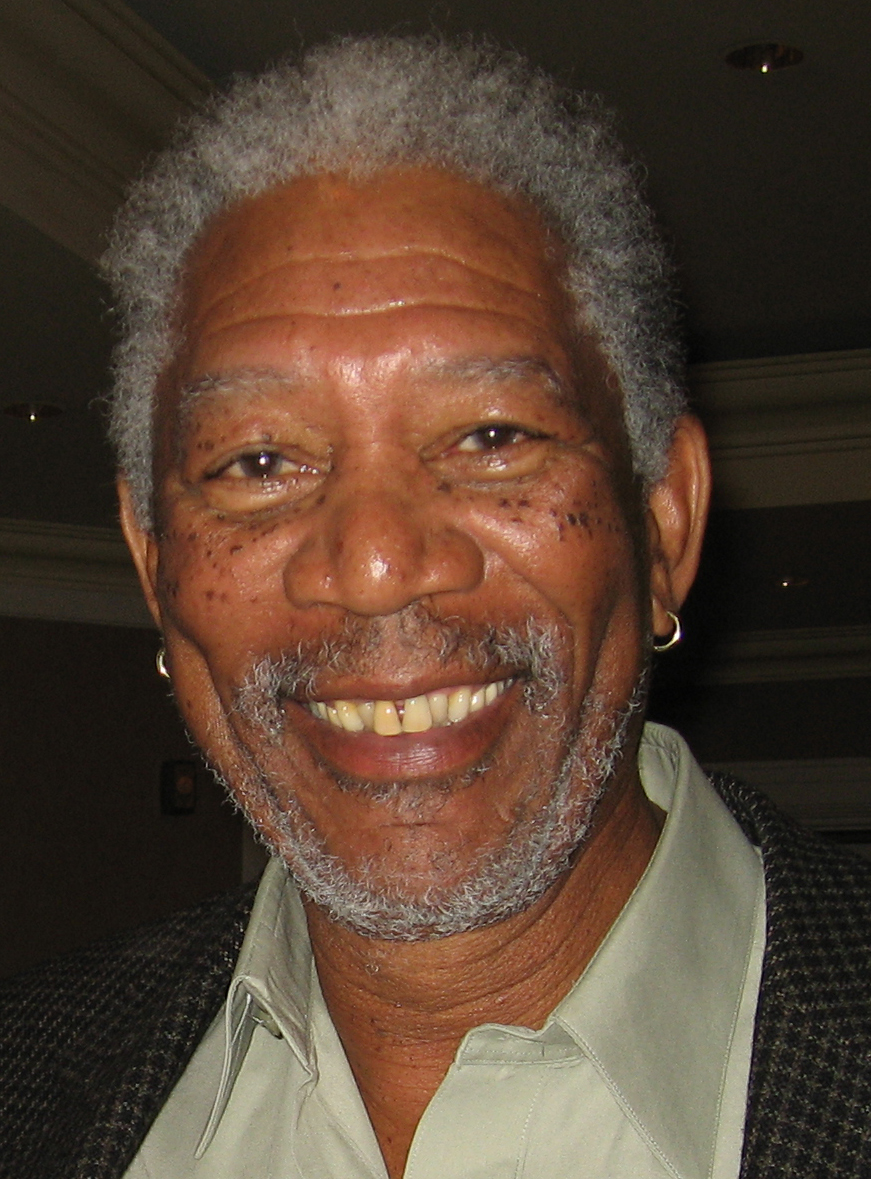
The performances of Hilary Swank and Morgan Freeman garnered critical acclaim, thus earning them the Academy Award for Best Actress and Best Supporting Actor respectively.

In early 2005, the film sparked controversy when some disability rights activists protested the ending. The Disability Rights Education Fund released a statement about the film in February 2005 that included the following: "Perhaps the most central stereotype fueling disability prejudice is the mistaken assumption inherent in the message of the movie that the quality of life of individuals with disabilities is unquestionably not worth living. This stereotype is contradicted by the personal experience of many thousands of people with significant disabilities in this country and around the world who view our own lives as ordinary and normal. It is further contradicted by plenty of hard data. Research overwhelmingly shows that people with disabilities find satisfaction in our lives to the same degree, or greater, than does the general public."

The Chicago Tribune reported that protests against the film by disability activists occurred in Chicago, Berkeley, and other cities, and that Clint Eastwood had lobbied for weakening provisions of the Americans with Disabilities Act.

Wesley J. Smith in The Weekly Standard also criticized the film for its ending and for missed opportunities; Smith wrote "The movie could have ended with Maggie triumphing once again, perhaps having obtained an education and becoming a teacher; or, opening a business managing boxers; or perhaps, receiving a standing ovation as an inspirational speaker."

Eastwood responded to the criticism by saying the film was about the American dream. In an interview with the Los Angeles Times, Eastwood distanced himself from the actions of characters in his films, noting, "I've gone around in movies blowing people away with a .44 Magnum. But that doesn't mean I think that's a proper thing to do". Roger Ebert stated that "a movie is not good or bad because of its content, but because of how it handles its content. Million Dollar Baby is classical in the clean, clear, strong lines of its story and characters, and had an enormous emotional impact".

The Gaelic nickname for Swank's character comes from the original phrase a chuisle mo chroí, meaning "O pulse of my heart"; one critic noted that the use of Gaelic in the film led to some interest in the language and the phrase.

=== Top ten lists ===
Million Dollar Baby was listed on many critics' top 10 lists for films released in 2004.

- 1st – A.O. Scott and Manohla Dargis, The New York Times
- 1st – Roger Ebert, Chicago Sun-Times
- 2nd – Richard Schickel, Time
- 2nd – Lisa Schwarzbaum, Entertainment Weekly
- 2nd – Jonathan Rosenbaum, Chicago Reader
- 2nd – Claudia Puig, USA Today
- 2nd – Keith Phipps, The A.V. Club
- 2nd – Ty Burr and Wesley Morris, Boston Globe
- 3rd – Kevin Thomas and Kenneth Turan, Los Angeles Times
- 3rd – Jack Matthews, New York Daily News
- 3rd – Glenn Kenny, Premiere
- 3rd – Carla Meyer & Ruthie Stein, San Francisco Chronicle
- 3rd – Peter Travers, Rolling Stone
- 4th – Mike Clark, USA Today
- 4th – David Ansen, Newsweek
- 4th – Jami Bernard, New York Daily News
- 5th – Robert Koehler, Variety
- 5th – James Berardinelli, Reelviews
- 6th – Stephen Holden, The New York Times
- 6th – Scott Tobias, The A.V. Club
- 6th – Richard Roeper, Ebert & Roeper
- 9th – Desson Thompson, Washington Post
- 10th – Nathan Rabin, The A.V. Club
- Top 10 (listed alphabetically) – Ron Stringer, L.A. Weekly
- Top 10 (listed alphabetically) – David Sterritt, Christian Science Monitor
- Top 10 (listed alphabetically)– Shawn Levy, Portland Oregonian
- Top 10 (listed alphabetically) – Carrie Rickey and Steven Rea, Philadelphia Inquirer

== Accolades ==
Million Dollar Baby received the award for Best Picture of 2004 at the 77th Academy Awards. Clint Eastwood was awarded his second Best Director Oscar for the film, and he received a Best Actor in a Leading Role nomination. Hilary Swank and Morgan Freeman received Best Actress in a Leading Role and Best Actor in a Supporting Role Oscars, respectively. Joel Cox, Eastwood's editor for many years, was nominated for Best Film Editing, and Paul Haggis was nominated for the Best Adapted Screenplay award.

The film was named the third "Best Film of the 21st Century So Far" in 2017 by The New York Times. It also ranked number 63 on Parade's list of the "100 Best Movies of All Time" in 2023. In 2025, it was one of the films voted for the "Readers' Choice" edition of The New York Times' list of "The 100 Best Movies of the 21st Century," finishing at number 269.

Award	Category	Subject	Result
Academy Awards	Best Picture	Clint Eastwood, Albert S. Ruddy and Tom Rosenberg	Won
Academy Awards	Best Director	Clint Eastwood	Won
Academy Awards	Best Actor	Clint Eastwood	Nominated
Academy Awards	Best Actress	Hilary Swank	Won
Academy Awards	Best Supporting Actor	Morgan Freeman	Won
Academy Awards	Best Adapted Screenplay	Paul Haggis	Nominated
Academy Awards	Best Film Editing	Joel Cox	Nominated
ACE Eddie	Best Editing	Joel Cox	Nominated
Amanda Award	Best Foreign Feature Film	Clint Eastwood	Nominated
American Screenwriters Association	Discover Screenwriting Award	Paul Haggis	Won
Art Directors Guild Award	Best Contemporary Feature Film	Henry Bumstead; Jack G. Taylor Jr.	Nominated
Billie Award	Best Film	Clint Eastwood; Albert S. Ruddy; Tom Rosenberg; Paul Haggis	Nominated
Black Reel Award	Best Supporting Actor	Morgan Freeman	Nominated
Broadcast Film Critics Association Award	Best Actress	Hilary Swank	Won
Broadcast Film Critics Association Award	Best Supporting Actor	Morgan Freeman	Nominated
Broadcast Film Critics Association Award	Best Director	Clint Eastwood	Nominated
Broadcast Film Critics Association Award	Best Film	Clint Eastwood; Albert S. Ruddy; Tom Rosenberg; Paul Haggis	Nominated
Casting Society of America Award	Best Casting for Feature Film: Drama	Phyllis Huffman	Nominated
César Awards	Best Foreign Film	Clint Eastwood; Albert S. Ruddy; Tom Rosenberg; Paul Haggis	Won
Chicago Film Critics Association Award	Best Director	Clint Eastwood	Won
David di Donatello Awards	Best Foreign Film	Clint Eastwood	Won
Directors Guild of America Award	Outstanding Directing	Clint Eastwood	Won
Director's Guild of Great Britain	Outstanding Director	Clint Eastwood	Nominated
ESPY Award	Best Sports Movie	Clint Eastwood; Albert S. Ruddy; Tom Rosenberg; Paul Haggis	Nominated
Florida Film Critics Circle Award	Best Actress	Hilary Swank	Won
Golden Globe Award	Best Actress	Hilary Swank	Won
Golden Globe Award	Best Director	Clint Eastwood	Won
Golden Globe Award	Best Supporting Actor	Morgan Freeman	Nominated
Golden Globe Award	Best Motion Picture—Drama	Clint Eastwood; Albert S. Ruddy; Tom Rosenberg; Paul Haggis	Nominated
Golden Globe Award	Best Original Score	Clint Eastwood	Nominated
Grammy Award	Best Score Soundtrack for Visual Media	Clint Eastwood	Nominated
Motion Picture Sound Editors Award	Best Sound Editing (Sound Effects & Foley)	Alar Robert Murray; Bub Asman; David Grimaldi; Jason King	Nominated
MTV Movie Award	Best Female Performance	Hilary Swank	Nominated
NAACP Image Award	Outstanding Supporting Actor	Morgan Freeman	Won
National Board of Review Award	Best Film	Clint Eastwood; Albert S. Ruddy; Tom Rosenberg; Paul Haggis	Nominated
National Board of Review Award	Best Director	Clint Eastwood	Nominated
National Board of Review Award	Best Actor	Clint Eastwood	Nominated
National Society of Film Critics Award	Best Film	Clint Eastwood	Won
National Society of Film Critics Award	Best Director	Clint Eastwood	Nominated
National Society of Film Critics Award	Best Actor	Clint Eastwood	Nominated
National Society of Film Critics Award	Best Actress	Hilary Swank	Won (Note: Tied with Imelda Staunton for Vera Drake.)
National Society of Film Critics Award	Best Supporting Actor	Morgan Freeman	Nominated
New York Film Critics Circle Award	Best Director	Clint Eastwood	Won
Producers Guild of America Award	Best Theatrical Motion Picture	Clint Eastwood; Albert S. Ruddy; Tom Rosenberg; Paul Haggis	Nominated
Phoenix Film Critics Society Award	Best Actress	Hilary Swank	Won
Phoenix Film Critics Society Award	Best Actor	Clint Eastwood	Nominated
Phoenix Film Critics Society Award	Best Director	Clint Eastwood	Nominated
Phoenix Film Critics Society Award	Best Supporting Actor	Morgan Freeman	Nominated
Phoenix Film Critics Society Award	Best Film	Clint Eastwood; Albert S. Ruddy; Tom Rosenberg; Paul Haggis	Nominated
Satellite Award	Best Actress	Hilary Swank	Won
Satellite Award	Best Adapted Screenplay	Paul Haggis	Won
Screen Actors Guild Award	Best Actress	Hilary Swank	Won
Screen Actors Guild Award	Best Supporting Actor	Morgan Freeman	Won
Screen Actors Guild Award	Best Cast		Nominated

== Home media ==
The film was released on VHS and DVD on July 12, 2005, and all editions of the Region 1 DVD, except for the deluxe edition, came with a paperback copy of the book Rope Burns: Stories from the Corner. An HD DVD release was issued on April 18, 2006. The Blu-ray Disc version was released on November 14, 2006. It was the first Best Picture winner released on either high-definition optical disc format in the United States; it and Unforgiven (also starring Eastwood and Freeman) were the only ones released in the United States on HD DVD prior to the first one released in the United States on Blu-ray, Crash. The film is also available online through video on demand and most major streaming platforms.

== See also ==
- Cinema of the United States
- List of American films of 2004
- List of boxing films

== Bibliography ==
- Eliot, Marc (2009). American Rebel: The Life of Clint Eastwood. Harmony Books. ISBN 978-0-307-33688-0.
- Hughes, Howard (2009). Aim for the Heart. London: I.B. Tauris. ISBN 978-1-84511-902-7.
