= Alpine Climbers =

1936 Mickey Mouse cartoon

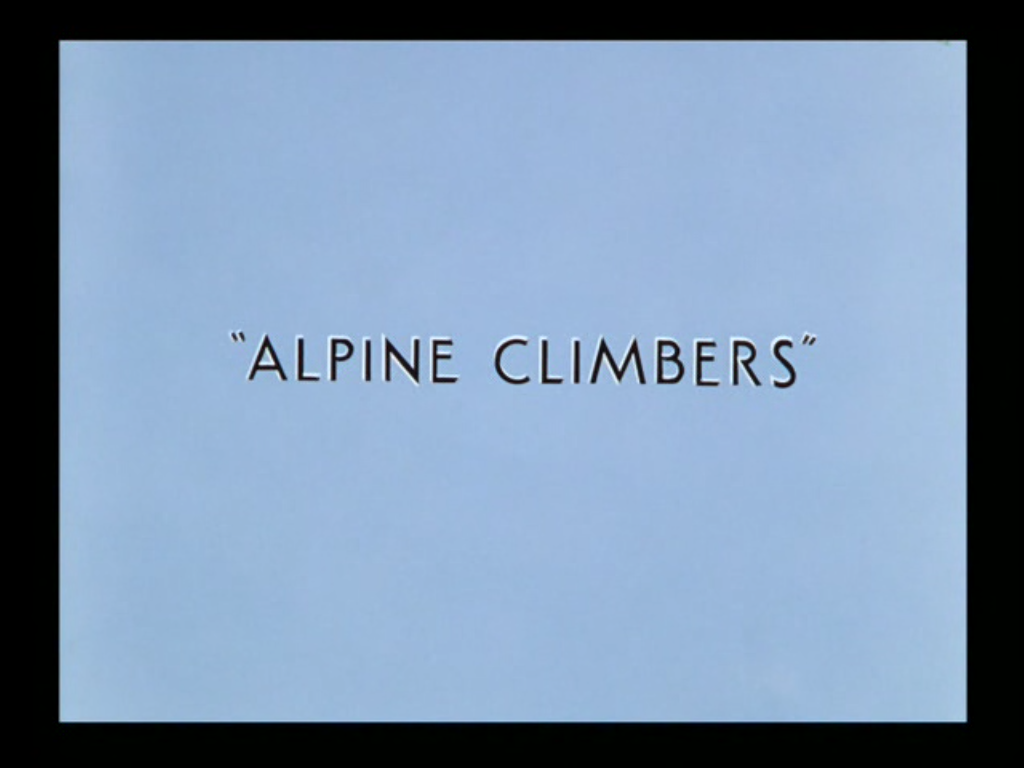
- Title card
- Directed by: David Hand
- Written by: Vernon Stallings
- Story by: Homer Brightman
- Produced by: Walt Disney
- Starring: Walt Disney; Clarence Nash; Lee Millar
- Music by: Albert Hay Malotte
- Animation by: Carl Barks; Bill Roberts; Norm Ferguson; Dick Huemer
- Color process: Technicolor
- Production company: Walt Disney Productions
- Distributed by: United Artists
- Release date: July 25, 1936
- Running time: 9 minutes
- Country: United States
- Language: English

Alpine Climbers is a 1936 American animated short film produced by Walt Disney Productions and released by United Artists. The cartoon follows Mickey Mouse, Donald Duck and Pluto as they climb the side of a mountain. The film was directed by David Hand and includes the voices of Walt Disney as Mickey, Clarence Nash as Donald and Lee Millar as Pluto. It was the ninth Mickey Mouse short to be released that year. As a work published in 1936 and a proper renewal notice filed within 28 years, the short will enter the American public domain in 2032. (Note: As governed by the laws of Title 17 of the United States Code.)

== Synopsis ==
Up in the Swiss Alps, Mickey Mouse tangles with a mother eagle, Donald Duck scraps with an edelweiss-stealing goat and Pluto gets inebriated with a St. Bernard.

== Voice cast ==
- Walt Disney as Mickey Mouse
- Clarence Nash as Donald Duck
- Lee Millar as Pluto
- Pinto Colvig as Yodeling Dogs

== Production ==
This is the only known Disney cartoon to feature animation by Carl Barks, an American cartoonist later known for his Donald Duck comics. One scene involving an Eagle flying was reworked with Walt Disney's input after he suggested the Eagle looked too human.

== Home media ==
The short was released on December 4, 2001 on Walt Disney Treasures: Mickey Mouse in Living Color.

== See also ==
- Mickey Mouse (film series)
