= Rope Burns: Stories from the Corner =

2000 collection of short fiction by F. X. Toole

Rope Burns
- Author: F.X. Toole
- Language: English
- Publisher: Ecco Press
- Publication date: 2000
- ISBN: 978-0-06-019820-6

Rope Burns: Stories from the Corner is a 2000 collection of short fiction works by F.X. Toole. The book is composed of five short stories and a novella. F.X. Toole is the pen name of Jerry Boyd, who had much of his fiction writing rejected for publication, before one of the then unpublished short stories in Rope Burns came to the attention of Howard Junker. One of the short stories in the book, "Million $$$ Baby", was later adapted to film as Million Dollar Baby.
