= F.X. Toole =

Boxing trainer, author

F.X. Toole is the pen name of boxing trainer Jerry Boyd (1930 – September 2, 2002). Toole is most noted for writing the 2000 collection of short stories Rope Burns: Stories from the Corner, which were adapted into the Oscar-winning movie Million Dollar Baby in 2004. F.X. Toole's posthumous novel Pound for Pound was released in 2006 to rave reviews. Cutman, a one-hour dramatic series set in the world of boxing, drawn from short stories by F.X. Toole, is in development by AMC Television.

Rope Burns: Stories from the Corner is dedicated to Dub Huntley, the man who introduced Boyd to boxing, and many of the characters and events related in the book are from Dub Huntley's life and experience. Huntley trained Boyd to box when Boyd was in his 40s and the two became friends during that time. Huntley was the trainer for world champions Laila Ali, Hector Lopez, and many others, including comedian/writer Chris Strait when he was an amateur boxer. Immediately before his death, Boyd was acting as a cutman and assistant trainer to Huntley with female professional boxer Juli Crockett, who Huntley told Sports Illustrated in an interview was the basis for the characterization of Maggie Fitzgerald in Million Dollar Baby. Boyd was born and raised in Long Beach, California, and died in Torrance, CA of a heart attack at age 71.
