= The Rescuers Down Under =

1990 American animated film

- Theatrical release poster by Bill Morrison.
- Directed by: Hendel Butoy; Mike Gabriel
- Screenplay by: Jim Cox; Karey Kirkpatrick; Byron Simpson; Joe Ranft
- Based on: Characters by Margery Sharp
- Produced by: Thomas Schumacher
- Starring: Bob Newhart; Eva Gabor; John Candy; Tristan Rogers; Adam Ryen; Wayne Robson; George C. Scott
- Edited by: Michael Kelly
- Music by: Bruce Broughton
- Production company: Walt Disney Feature Animation
- Distributed by: Buena Vista Pictures Distribution (Note: Distributed under the Walt Disney Pictures banner, with funding by Silver Screen Partners IV.)
- Release date: November 16, 1990 (United States)
- Running time: 77 minutes
- Country: United States
- Language: English
- Box office: $47.4 million

The Rescuers Down Under is a 1990 American animated adventure film produced by Walt Disney Feature Animation and the sequel to The Rescuers (1977). In the film, Bernard and Bianca travel to the Australian Outback to save a young boy named Cody from a villainous poacher who wants to capture an endangered golden eagle for money. It was directed by Hendel Butoy and Mike Gabriel and written by Jim Cox, Karey Kirkpatrick, Byron Simpson, and Joe Ranft. Bob Newhart and Eva Gabor (in her final film role) reprise their roles as Bernard and Bianca respectively, with John Candy, Tristan Rogers, Adam Ryen, Wayne Robson, and George C. Scott in supporting roles.

By the mid-1980s, The Rescuers had become one of Disney's most successful animated releases. Under the new management of Michael Eisner and Jeffrey Katzenberg, a feature-length sequel was approved, making it the first animated film sequel theatrically released by the studio. Following their duties on Oliver & Company (1988), animators Butoy and Gabriel were recruited to direct the sequel. Research trips to Australia provided inspiration for the background designs. The film would also mark the full use of the Computer Animation Production System (CAPS), becoming the first feature film to be completely created digitally. The software allowed for artists to digitally ink-and-paint the animators' drawings, and then composite the digital cels over the scanned background art.

The Rescuers Down Under was released in theaters on November 16, 1990. The film received generally positive reviews from critics, but it underperformed at the box office, grossing $47.4 million worldwide.

== Plot ==
In the Outback, a young boy named Cody rescues and befriends Marahute, a rare golden eagle, who shows him her nest and eggs and gives him one of her feathers. Cody later rescues a mouse who is being used as bait in an animal trap set by Percival C. McLeach, a poacher who killed Marahute's mate and is wanted by the Australian Rangers. Catching Cody in the trap and realizing he has Marahute's feather and must know her location, McLeach kidnaps him and throws his backpack to a float of crocodiles; this convinces the Rangers that Cody is dead.

The rescued mouse hurries to an RAS outpost to inform the operator of the kidnapping; a telegram is sent to the Rescue Aid Society headquarters in New York City. Bernard and Miss Bianca, the RAS's elite field agents, are assigned to rescue Cody, interrupting Bernard's attempts to propose marriage to Bianca. They go to find Orville the albatross, who aided them before, but discover that he has retired and his brother Wilbur has taken over for him. Despite the harsh winter conditions, he agrees to fly them to Australia. Upon landing, they meet Jake, a hopping mouse who is the RAS's local regional operative. Jake becomes infatuated with Bianca and flirts with her, to Bernard's dismay. Jake serves as their "tour guide" and protector in search of Cody. Wilbur bends his spinal column out of shape trying to help them, so Jake sends him to the hospital. Wilbur refuses to undergo surgery, but his back is straightened as he fights to escape the medical mice, and he flies away in search of his friends.

At McLeach's hideout, Cody refuses to divulge Marahute's whereabouts. McLeach tricks Cody into thinking someone else killed Marahute and releases him, knowing that he will go to her nest. He does, and McLeach captures Marahute along with Cody, Jake, and Bianca. Bernard hides Marahute's eggs from McLeach's pet goanna, Joanna. Wilbur catches up to Bernard, who orders him to watch the eggs, much to his dismay.

McLeach takes his captives to Crocodile Falls, a huge waterfall at the end of the river he threw Cody's backpack into. He ties Cody up and hangs him over the float of crocodiles, intent on feeding him to them to eliminate him as a witness. Bernard, riding a razorback pig he tamed using a horse whispering technique he learned from Jake, arrives and disables McLeach's vehicle before he can succeed. McLeach then attempts to shoot the rope holding Cody above the water, but Bernard tricks Joanna into crashing into McLeach, sending both of them into the water. The crocodiles turn their attention to McLeach and Joanna; behind them, Cody falls into the water as the damaged rope breaks. As Joanna flees to the bank, McLeach fends off and taunts the crocodiles, forgetting about the waterfall and being washed over it to his death. Bernard dives into the water and holds Cody long enough for Jake and Bianca to free Marahute, allowing her to save Cody and Bernard.

Bernard finally proposes to Bianca; she accepts, and Jake salutes Bernard with new-found respect. Safe at last, the group departs for Cody's home. Meanwhile, Wilbur is still protecting Marahute's eggs; one of the eaglets hatches and bites him, to his dismay.

== Voice cast ==
The Rescuers Down Under features three characters from the first film; Bernard, Bianca and the Chairmouse, all of whom feature the same actors reprising their roles from the original 1977 film.

- Bob Newhart as Bernard, a male grey mouse; the American representative of the Rescue Aid Society, promoted from his role as janitor to full-fledged agent after proving a success with the previous rescue and later successfully proposed to Miss Bianca after many interruptions.
- Eva Gabor as Miss Bianca, a female white mouse; the Hungarian representative of the Rescue Aid Society and later Bernard's fiancée. This was Gabor's last film role before her death in 1995.
- John Candy as Wilbur, a comical albatross; named after Wilbur Wright. He is the brother of Orville, the albatross who appeared in the first film (named after Orville Wright).
- Tristan Rogers as Jake, a debonair, self-confident and charismatic hopping mouse.
- Adam Ryen as Cody, a young boy able to converse with most animals, the same as Penny in the first film.
- George C. Scott as Percival C. McLeach, a sinister and nefarious poacher who wants to capture Marahute for money.
- Peter Firth as Red, a male red kangaroo imprisoned by McLeach.
- Wayne Robson as Frank, a fearful and erratic frill-necked lizard imprisoned by McLeach.
- Douglas Seale as Krebbs, a pessimistic koala imprisoned by McLeach.
- Carla Meyer as Faloo, a female red kangaroo who summons Cody to save Marahute. Meyer also voices Cody's mother.
- Bernard Fox as Chairmouse, the chairman of the Rescue Aid Society. Fox also voices Doctor Mouse, the supervisor of the surgical mice who examine Wilbur when he is injured.
- Russi Taylor as Nurse Mouse, the operator of Doctor Mouse's instructions and a competent second-in-command.
- Billy Barty as Baitmouse.
- Ed Gilbert as Francois, a French-accented cricket waiter.
- Peter Greenwood as The Airplane Captain and The Radio Announcer.
- Frank Welker as Marahute, a large golden eagle. Welker also voiced Joanna, McLeach's pet goanna, who enjoys intimidating her captives and has a fondness for eggs; and additional special vocal effects.

== Production ==
=== Development ===
By 1984, The Rescuers had become one of Disney's most successful recent animated films, earning $41 million in worldwide box office rentals. Under the new studio management of then-CEO Michael Eisner and studio chairman Jeffrey Katzenberg, it was decided that a sequel should be produced. Writing began in 1986 and it was determined the film would be set in Australia, due to the success of Crocodile Dundee (1986), which had enhanced the appeal of Australian culture to a mainstream American audience.

When Oliver & Company (1988) was nearly complete, Peter Schneider, then-president of Walt Disney Feature Animation, asked supervising animator Mike Gabriel if he would consider directing. At the time, Gabriel declined the offer, stating, "Well, after watching George [Scribner], it doesn't look like it would be much fun." A few months later, Schneider called Gabriel into his office, and asked him if he would direct The Rescuers Down Under, to which Gabriel accepted. After animating the character Tito on Oliver & Company, which was met with praise from general audiences, Hendel Butoy was added as the film's co-director. Meanwhile, Schneider recruited Thomas Schumacher, who had worked at the Mark Taper Forum, to serve as producer on the film.

As the film's producer, Schumacher selected storyboard artist Joe Ranft to serve as story supervisor, believing he had the "ability to change and transform through excellence of idea". Throughout the storyboarding process, Ranft constantly bolstered the creative morale of his crew, but he rarely drew storyboard sequences himself. Ranft also had creative disagreements with the studio's management and marketing executives, including one where he and the story team advocated for an Aboriginal Australian child actor to voice Cody. According to storyboard artist Brenda Chapman, Katzenberg overrode this idea, casting "a little white blonde kid" and giving Cody a matching design.

Because of the rising popularity of Australian-themed action films, and with Americans becoming more environmentally conscious, the filmmakers decided to abandon the musical format from the original film. They had decided that the placement of songs would slow down the pacing for the new film. Instead, they decided to market it as the studio's first action-adventure film, with Butoy and Gabriel taking inspiration from live-action films by Orson Welles, Alfred Hitchcock, and David Lean. It would also be the studio's first animated film since Bambi (1942) to have an animal rights and environmental message. In December 1988, original cast members Bob Newhart and Eva Gabor were confirmed to be reprising their roles. However, Jim Jordan, who had voiced Orville in the original film, died earlier that same year in April following a fall at his home. In acknowledgment of Jordan's death, Roy E. Disney suggested that the character of Wilbur be written as Orville's brother, to serve as his replacement. Intentionally, the names were in reference to the Wright brothers.

=== Animation and design ===
Members of the production team, including art director Maurice Hunt and six of his animators, spent several days in Australia to study settings and animals found in the Australian Outback to observe, take photographs, and draw sketches to properly illustrate the Outback on film. They ventured through the Uluru, Katherine Gorge, and the Kakadu National Parks, the inspiration for Hunt's initial designs emphasizing the spectrum of scale between the sweeping vistas and the film's protagonists.

Serving as the supervising animator on the eagle character Marahute, Glen Keane studied six eagles residing at the Peregrine Fund in Boise, Idaho, as well as a stuffed American eagle loaned from the Los Angeles Museum of Natural History and an eagle skeleton. To animate the eagle, Keane and his animation crew enlarged the bird, shrank its head, elongated its neck and wings, and puffed out its chest. Additionally, Keane had to slow the bird's wing movements to about 25–30 percent of an eagle's flight speed. Because of the excessive details on Marahute, who carried 200 feathers, the character appeared for only seven minutes altogether, during the opening and ending sequences.

Furthermore, to have the film finished on time, Schumacher enlisted the support of Disney-MGM Studios, which was originally envisioned to produce independent cartoon shorts and featurettes. On their first assignment on a Disney animated feature film, 70 artists contributed ten minutes of screen time, including supervising animator Mark Henn. As one of the film's ten supervising animators, Henn animated several scenes of Bernard, Miss Bianca, and Percival C. McLeach. For the mice characters, Henn studied the mannerisms of Bob Newhart and Eva Gabor during voice recording sessions, and looked to George C. Scott's performance in Dr. Strangelove (1964) for inspiration while animating McLeach. To create believable realism for the Australian animals, additional animators traveled to the San Diego Zoo to observe kangaroos, kookaburras, and snakes, while an iguana from Walt Disney World's Discovery Island was brought into the studio for the animators drawing Joanna.

The Rescuers Down Under is notable for Disney as its first traditionally animated film using only the new computerized CAPS process. CAPS (Computer Animation Production System) was a computer-based production system used for digital ink and paint and compositing, allowing for more efficient and sophisticated post-production of the Disney animated films and making the traditional practice of hand-painting cels obsolete. The animators' drawings and the background paintings were scanned into computer systems instead, where the animation drawings were inked and painted by digital artists. The drawings were later composited with the scanned backgrounds in software to allow for digital compositing like camera positioning, camera movements, multiplane effects, and other camera techniques. Those digital files would then be recorded onto film stock.

The film also uses CGI elements throughout, such as the field of flowers in the opening sequence, McLeach's truck, and perspective shots of Wilbur flying above Sydney Opera House and New York City. The CAPS project was the first of Disney's collaborations with computer graphics company Pixar, which would eventually become a feature animation production studio making computer-generated animated films for Disney before being acquired in 2006. As a result, The Rescuers Down Under was the first animated film for which the entire final film elements were assembled and completed within a digital environment, as well as the first fully digital feature film. However, the film's marketing approach did not call attention to the use of the CAPS process.

== Music ==
The Rescuers Down Under: Original Motion Picture Soundtrack

Film score by Bruce Broughton
- Released: 1991
- Labels: Walt Disney (1991 and 2002 releases); Intrada (2016 release)
- Producer: Bruce Broughton

The score for the film was composed and conducted by Bruce Broughton. Unlike the vast majority of Disney animated features, the film had no songs written for it (although "Message Montage" includes a quotation from "Rescue Aid Society" by Sammy Fain, Carol Connors, and Ayn Robbins, the only musical reference to the first film). This was the second Disney film not to include any original songs, the first one being The Black Cauldron.

The score received positive critical reception, with critics singling out "Cody's Flight" for its sense of majesty, excitement, and freedom. AllMusic gave the soundtrack 4.5 out of 5 stars.

In 2002, Walt Disney Records reissued the album on compact disc, including the Shelby Flint songs "The Journey", "Someone's Waiting for You" and "Tomorrow Is Another Day" (from The Rescuers). In 2016, Intrada Records released the complete Broughton score, including material (in italics) not used in the movie.

== Release ==
During the film's theatrical release, the film was released as a double feature with the new Mickey Mouse short film The Prince and the Pauper. It was released the same day as the Christmas hit Home Alone which also features John Candy.

=== Home media ===
The Rescuers Down Under was released in the Walt Disney Classics video series on September 17, 1991, while The Rescuers was released on VHS a year later on September 18, 1992. Unlike the original film, however, The Rescuers Down Under was not included in the Walt Disney Masterpiece Collection line. Both home video releases went into moratorium on April 30, 1993. In its original release, the VHS edition sold 5.2 million units in the United States, generating $72.8 million in revenue.

Launching in January 2000, Walt Disney Home Video began the Gold Classic Collection, with The Rescuers Down Under re-issued on VHS and DVD on August 1, 2000. The DVD contained the film in its 1.66:1 aspect ratio enhanced for 16:9 television sets and 4.0 surround sound, and was accompanied with special features, including a storybook and trivia as well as an "Animals of the Outback" activity booklet.

The Rescuers Down Under was released alongside The Rescuers on Blu-ray in a "2-Movie Collection" on August 21, 2012, to commemorate the first film's 35th anniversary in the United States.

== Reception ==
=== Box office ===
During its opening weekend, The Rescuers Down Under grossed $3.5 million, ranking fourth, after Home Alone, Rocky V, and Child's Play 2. As a result, Katzenberg decided to recall the film's television advertising. The film eventually earned $27.9 million in the United States and $47.4 million worldwide, becoming a box office bomb. In 1991, it was the fourth highest-grossing film in Germany, with admissions of 3.1 million.

=== Critical reaction ===
On the review aggregator website Rotten Tomatoes, 85% of 66 critics' reviews are positive, with an average rating of 7/10. The website's consensus reads: "The Rescuers Down Under achieves moments of genuine wonder while adding Outback flavor to its charmingly modest story, making for a sequel that outdoes the original." Metacritic, which uses a weighted average, assigned the film a score of 68 out of 100, based on 20 critics, indicating "generally favorable" reviews.

Roger Ebert of the Chicago Sun-Times awarded the film 3 out of 4 stars and wrote, "Animation can give us the glory of sights and experiences that are impossible in the real world, and one of those sights, in 'The Rescuers Down Under,' is of a little boy clinging to the back of a soaring eagle. The flight sequence and many of the other action scenes in this new Disney animated feature create an exhilaration and freedom that are liberating. And the rest of the story is fun, too." Gene Siskel of The Chicago Tribune, who also gave the film three stars out of four, summarized the film as a "bold, rousing but sometimes needlessly intense Disney animated feature" where "good fun is provided by a goofy albatross (voiced by John Candy), one in a long line of silly Disney birds". Janet Maslin, reviewing for The New York Times, praised the animation and the action sequences, though she remained critical of the storyline, labeling it "a trifle dark and un-involving for very small children"; Maslin acknowledged that its "slightly more grown-up, adventurous approach may be the reason it does not include the expected musical interludes, but they would have been welcome". A review in Variety felt the film carried "such a mediocre story that adults may duck", but nevertheless wrote that The Rescuers Down Under "boasts reasonably solid production values and fine character voices". Charles Solomon of Los Angeles Times said, "With its exhilarating action sequences, Walt Disney Pictures' The Rescuers Down Under challenges the adventure films of Spielberg and Lucas and confirms the special power of animation to present extravagant fantasies on screen."

Rita Kempley of The Washington Post praised the film as "a gorgeously drawn myth made for plucky children and very brave mice." Halliwell's Film Guide gave it two stars out of four, saying, "[This] slick, lively and enjoyable animated feature [is] an improvement on the original." TV Guide gave the film two stars out of four, saying, "Three years in the making, it was obviously conceived during the height of this country's fascination with Australia, brought on by Paul Hogan's fabulously successful Crocodile Dundee (1986). By 1990, the mania had long since subsided, and this film's Australian setting did nothing to enhance its box office appeal. Further, the film doesn't make particularly imaginative use of the location. Take away the accents and the obligatory kangaroos and koalas, and the story could have taken place anywhere."

In a 2013 review, Josh Spiegel wrote: "The Rescuers Down Under is not the great undiscovered Disney movie, mind you. The film was done in by bad contextual timing and poor scheduling and marketing, and fans of animation would likely enjoy it for its somewhat large scope and setpieces. However, this is just a decent movie, one that feels as tiny as its leads." Conversely, Ellen MacKay of Common Sense Media gave the film four out of five stars, writing, "A rare sequel that improves on the original".

=== Accolades ===
Award	Date of ceremony	Category	Recipient(s)	Result
Los Angeles Film Critics Association	December 16, 1990	Best Animated Film	Hendel Butoy and Mike Gabriel	Won
Dallas–Fort Worth Film Critics Association	1991	Best Animated Film	Hendel Butoy and Mike Gabriel	Won
Golden Reel Awards	1991	Golden Reel Award for Outstanding Achievement in Sound Editing – Sound Effects, Foley, Dialogue and ADR for Animated Feature Film	The Rescuers Down Under	Won
Young Artist Award	Late 1990/Early 1991	Most Entertaining Family Youth Motion Picture: Animation	The Rescuers Down Under	Won

== Legacy ==
The film is considered to be a part of the Disney Renaissance, a period of time which Disney returned to producing commercially and/or critically successful animated films. Like other Disney animated characters, the characters of the film have recurring cameo appearances in the television series House of Mouse. Along with other Disney characters, the main characters of the film have cameo appearances in the short film Once Upon a Studio.
