= Mike Gabriel =

American animator and film director (born 1954)

- Born: November 5, 1954 (age 72); Long Beach, California, U.S.
- Education: Golden West College
- Occupations: Film director, animator, storyboard artist, visual development artist
- Years active: 1979–present
- Known for: The Rescuers Down Under, Pocahontas, Lorenzo
- Spouse: Tammy Gabriel
- Children: 3

Mike Gabriel (born November 5, 1954) is an American animator and film director, best known for his work at Walt Disney Animation Studios and as co-director of the Disney animated films The Rescuers Down Under (1990) and Pocahontas (1995).

== Early life ==
He was born in Long Beach, California, although he grew up in various small towns like Salina, Kansas while moving around due to his father's Air Force job.

== Career ==
Gabriel was inspired with animation after watching Sleeping Beauty (1959) at the age of five. Soon after, he started drawing and practicing it for six hours every day to meet his goal as an Animation Director. It was in 1979 when he got his first chance to make his debut. Gabriel originally began his career as an assistant on The Fox and the Hound (1981). He later was assigned as a Disney animator on the animated short Fun with Mr. Future (1982). He was mentored under Eric Larson's training program, and went to work on The Black Cauldron (1985). He also served as an animator on The Great Mouse Detective (1986), Technological Threat and Oliver & Company (1988). Hendel Butoy joined Gabriel to direct The Rescuers Down Under, a sequel to the 1977 Disney animated film The Rescuers, while Eric Goldberg and Gabriel collaborated on Pocahontas.

In 2004, Gabriel directed an animated short for Disney entitled Lorenzo, a hybrid of traditional and computer animation about a lazy cat who has a spell cast on his tail that forces it to tango with him.

== Accolades ==
Lorenzo was nominated for the 2005 Academy Award for Best Animated Short. It was also included in the Animation Show of Shows in 2004.

== Personal life ==
He was hired to re-design the Walt Disney cinematic logo which plays before every Walt Disney picture since 2006.

== Filmography ==
Year	Title	Director	Writer	Animator	Actor	Role	Notes
1981	The Fox and the Hound			Yes			Assistant Animator (Uncredited)
1982	Luau				Yes	Bob	
1982	Fun with Mr. Future			Yes			
1985	The Black Cauldron			Yes			Character Animator: Orddu, Orwen, and Orgoch
1986	The Great Mouse Detective			Yes			Character Animator: Toby and Felicia
1988	Oliver & Company		Yes	Yes			Writer: Story; Character Designer; Supervising Animator: Oliver
1988	Technological Threat		Yes				Character Designer
1990	The Rescuers Down Under	Yes					With Hendel Butoy
1994	The Lion King			Yes			Animator: Special Edition
1995	Pocahontas	Yes	Yes	Yes			With Eric Goldberg; Writer: Based On An Idea; Visual Development Artist; Character Designer
1996	Quack Pack			Yes			One episode Character Designer; Supervising Animator
1999	My Neighbors the Yamadas			Yes			dialogue director for the 2005 English dub.
1999	Fantasia 2000			Yes			Yo-yo Tricks
2000	Dinosaur			Yes			Additional Visual Development
2004	Lorenzo	Yes	Yes	Yes			Production Designer
2004	Home on the Range			Yes			Visual Development Artist
2004	The Cat That Looked at a King			Yes			Character Designer; Supervising Animator
2008	Bolt			Yes			Additional Story Artist
2009	The Princess and the Frog			Yes			Additional Art Director
2011	Winnie the Pooh			Yes			Visual Development Artist
2012	Brave			Yes			Development Artist
2012	Frankenweenie			Yes			Art Department Illustrator: Los Angeles
2012	Wreck-It Ralph			Yes			Production Designer
2014	Big Hero 6			Yes			Departmental Leadership: Walt Disney Animation Studios
2016	Zootopia			Yes			Departmental Leadership: Walt Disney Animation Studios
2019	Frozen II			Yes			Creative Legacy: Walt Disney Animation Studios
2020	Elephant in the Room			Yes			Thought Painter; Visual Development
2021	Raya and the Last Dragon			Yes			Creative Legacy: Walt Disney Animation Studios
