= Fantasia (franchise) =

American media franchise owned by The Walt Disney Company

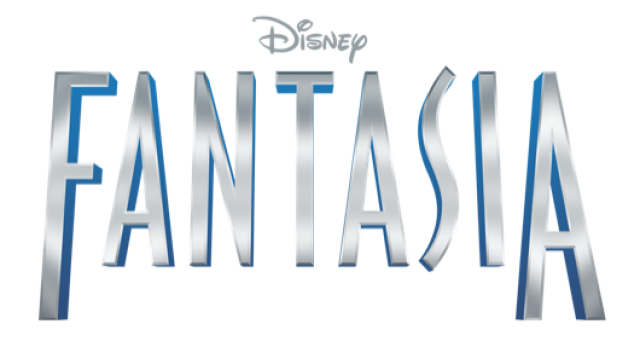
- Logo for Fantasia, used in Fantasia: Music Evolved
- Created by: Walt Disney
- Original work: Fantasia (1940)
- Owner: The Walt Disney Company

Films and television
- Films: Fantasia (1940); Fantasia 2000 (2000); The Sorcerer's Apprentice (2010); The Nutcracker and the Four Realms (2018)
- Short films: Destino (2003); Lorenzo (2004); One by One (2004); The Little Matchgirl (2006)

Games
- Video games: Sorcerer's Apprentice (1983); Fantasia (1991); Kingdom Hearts (2002)^{*}; Kingdom Hearts II (2005)^{*}; Epic Mickey (2010)^{*}; Kingdom Hearts 3D: Dream Drop Distance (2012)^{*}; Disney Infinity (2013)^{*}; Fantasia: Music Evolved (2014); Disney Magical World (2014)^{*}

Miscellaneous
- Theme park attractions: Fantasmic! (1992–present); Sorcerer's Hat (2001–2015)
- Miniature golf course: Fantasia Gardens (1996–present)
- Concert tour: Disney Fantasia: Live in Concert
- Resort hotel: Fantasia section at Disney's All-Star Movies Resort
- All short films listed were proposed for the cancelled Fantasia 2006 project.^{*} Work where this franchise's characters or settings appeared as part of a crossover.

Fantasia is an American media franchise owned by The Walt Disney Company that commenced in 1940 with the theatrical release of the film of the same name.

== Animated feature films ==
=== Fantasia ===
Fantasia is a 1940 American animated feature film produced by Walt Disney and released by Walt Disney Productions. With story direction by Joe Grant and Dick Huemer, and production supervision by Ben Sharpsteen, it is the third Disney animated feature film. The film consists of eight animated segments set to pieces of classical music conducted by Leopold Stokowski; seven of which are performed by the Philadelphia Orchestra. Music critic and composer Deems Taylor acts as the film's master of ceremonies, introducing each segment in live-action interstitial scenes.

=== Fantasia 2000 ===
Fantasia 2000 is a 1999 American animated feature film produced by Walt Disney Animation Studios and released by Walt Disney Pictures. It is the sequel to the 1940 film Fantasia. As with its predecessor, the film consists of animated segments set to pieces of classical music, with "The Sorcerer's Apprentice" being the only segment that is featured in both films. The soundtrack was performed by the Chicago Symphony Orchestra and Chorus with conductor James Levine. A group of celebrities introduces each segment in live-action scenes including Steve Martin, Itzhak Perlman, Bette Midler, Penn & Teller, James Earl Jones, Quincy Jones, and Angela Lansbury.

== Cancelled projects ==
=== Musicana ===
In 1980, Los Angeles Times reported that animators Wolfgang Reitherman and Mel Shaw had begun work on Musicana, "an ambitious concept mixing jazz, classical music, myths, modern art and more, following the old Fantasia format". The project was shelved in favor of Mickey's Christmas Carol.

=== Fantasia 2006 ===
Early development for a third film began in 2002, with a working title of Fantasia 2006. Plans were made to include One by One by Pixote Hunt and The Little Matchgirl by Roger Allers in the film before the project was shelved in 2004 for reasons unknown, with the proposed segments released as individual short films.

Destino is an animated short film released in 2003 by The Walt Disney Company. Destino is unique in that its production originally began in 1945, 58 years before its eventual completion. The project was originally a collaboration between Walt Disney and Spanish surrealist painter Salvador Dalí, and features music written by Mexican songwriter Armando Dominguez and performed by Dora Luz. In 1999, Walt Disney's nephew Roy E. Disney unearthed the project while working on Fantasia 2000 and decided to revive it.

Lorenzo is a 2004 American animated short film produced by Walt Disney Feature Animation about a cat, Lorenzo, who is "dismayed to discover that his tail has developed a personality of its own." The short was directed by Mike Gabriel and produced by Baker Bloodworth. It premiered at the Florida Film Festival on March 6, 2004, and later appeared as a feature before the film Raising Helen; however, it did not appear on the DVD release of the film. Work on the film began in 1943, but was shelved. It was later found along with Destino.

One by One is a traditionally animated short film directed by Pixote Hunt and released by Walt Disney Pictures on August 31, 2004, as an extra feature on the DVD release of The Lion King II: Simba's Pride Special Edition.

The Little Matchgirl is a 2006 animated short film directed by Roger Allers and produced by Don Hahn. It is based on an original story by Hans Christian Andersen entitled The Little Girl with the Matches or The Little Match Girl, published in 1845.

== Live-action films ==
=== The Sorcerer's Apprentice ===
The Sorcerer's Apprentice is a 2010 American fantasy adventure film produced by Jerry Bruckheimer, directed by Jon Turteltaub, and distributed by Walt Disney Pictures. The film stars Nicolas Cage, Jay Baruchel, Alfred Molina, Teresa Palmer, and Monica Bellucci. The film is named after the Sorcerer's Apprentice segment in the films (with one scene being an extensive reference to it).

=== The Nutcracker and the Four Realms ===
The Nutcracker and the Four Realms is a 2018 American fantasy adventure film directed by Lasse Hallström and Joe Johnston, written by Ashleigh Powell, and distributed by Walt Disney Pictures. The film stars Keira Knightley, Mackenzie Foy, Eugenio Derbez, Matthew Macfadyen, Richard E. Grant, Misty Copeland, Helen Mirren, and Morgan Freeman. The Nutcracker Suite segment serves as an inspiration for the feature-length film, which itself contains various references to Fantasia.

=== Night on Bald Mountain live-action adaptation ===
In June 2015, Disney was developing the Night on Bald Mountain sequence from the film, with Matt Sazama and Burk Sharpless writing and executive producing the live-action film. However, as of October 2019, no updates on the project have been announced.

== Theme park attractions ==
=== Fantasmic! ===
Fantasmic! is a nighttime show at Disneyland in the Disneyland Resort, Disney's Hollywood Studios in Walt Disney World and Tokyo DisneySea in Tokyo Disney Resort. The show features fireworks, live actors, water effects, pyrotechnics, music, several boats, decorated rafts and projections onto large mist screens featuring reworked Disney animation.

=== Fantasia Gardens ===
The Fantasia Gardens Miniature Golf complex is a miniature golf course located at Walt Disney World in Florida, United States. Located across from the Swan and Dolphin resorts, it has two 18-hole courses themed after Fantasia and opened on May 20, 1996.

=== Mickey's PhilharMagic ===
Mickey's PhilharMagic is a Fantasyland attraction at Walt Disney World theme parks. The story is a variant on "The Sorcerer's Apprentice", when Donald Duck tries to set up an orchestra for "Maestro Mickey" using the famous Sorcerer's Hat. But the orchestra turns on him and Donald must journey through several Disney musical numbers to get the hat back for Mickey. The show first opened in October 2003.

=== Sorcerer's Hat ===
Sorcerer's Hat was the icon of Disney's Hollywood Studios, the third of four theme parks built at Walt Disney World in Bay Lake, Florida. Mickey Mouse's gloved hand and ears underneath the hat are visible emerging from the ground. With its opening on September 28, 2001, it replaced the Earful Tower as the park's icon in marketing material. In October 2014, Disney confirmed that the structure would be removed by early 2015. The structure's removal began on January 7, 2015.

== Video games ==
=== Sorcerer's Apprentice (Atari) ===
In 1983, Atari released a game called Sorcerer's Apprentice for the Atari 2600, based on the eponymous segment of Fantasia. The player, as Mickey Mouse, must collect falling stars and comets which will prevent the army of marching brooms from flooding Yen Sid's cavern.

=== Fantasia (Sega) ===
In 1991, a side-scrolling Fantasia video game developed by Infogrames was released for the Sega Mega Drive/Genesis system. The player controls Mickey Mouse, who must find missing musical notes scattered across four elemental worlds based upon the film's segments.

=== Epic Mickey ===
There are several film reel levels based on some of the film's segments such as Sorcerer's Apprentice and Night on Bald Mountain that appear in the Epic Mickey games. Yen Sid also acts as the creator of Wasteland, the setting of the games.

=== Kingdom Hearts ===
The Disney/Square Enix crossover game series Kingdom Hearts features Chernabog as a boss in the first installment and in Dream Drop Distance. Yen Sid appears as a supporting character in the series beginning with Kingdom Hearts II, voiced in English by Corey Burton. Symphony of Sorcery, a world based on the film, appears in Dream Drop Distance.

=== Disney Infinity series ===
Disney Infinity is an action-adventure sandbox toys-to-life video game series that was first released in 2013. The series contained references to Fantasia and other Disney properties. A Mickey Mouse figurine based on his appearance in The Sorcerer's Apprentice segment in the films was released on January 26, 2014, with a translucent "Infinite" series version of the figure released as a Toys "R" Us exclusive. "Sorcerer's Apprentice Mickey Mouse" is playable in all three games of the series.

=== Fantasia: Music Evolved ===
Fantasia: Music Evolved is a motion-controlled music rhythm game developed by Harmonix for the Xbox 360 and Xbox One with Kinect. It is the interactive successor to Fantasia and Fantasia 2000. It was released on October 21, 2014.

=== Disney Magic Kingdoms ===
Disney Magic Kingdoms includes a Sorcerer costume for Mickey Mouse. A Magic Broom and Chernabog appear as playable characters to unlock for a limited time. The game also features the attractions based on the franchise Fantasia Gardens and Fairways (featuring the Magic Brooms as non-player characters) and Fantasmic!.

== Concert ==
=== Disney Fantasia: Live in Concert ===
A live concert presentation of the film named Disney Fantasia: Live in Concert, showcases various segments from both Fantasia and Fantasia 2000. The concert version features a live symphony orchestra and piano soloist accompanying projected high definition video segments. As of 2023, the concert is touring throughout the world.
