= Fantasia (1940 film) =

1940 animated film by Walt Disney

- Theatrical release poster
- Directed by: Samuel Armstrong; James Algar; Bill Roberts; Paul Satterfield; Ben Sharpsteen; David D. Hand; Hamilton Luske; Jim Handley; Ford Beebe, Jr.; T. Hee; Norman Ferguson; Wilfred Jackson
- Story by: Joe Grant; Dick Huemer
- Produced by: Walt Disney
- Starring: Leopold Stokowski; Deems Taylor
- Cinematography: James Wong Howe
- Production company: Walt Disney Productions
- Distributed by: RKO Radio Pictures
- Release date: November 13, 1940
- Running time: 126 minutes
- Country: United States
- Language: English
- Budget: $2.28 million
- Box office: $76.4–$83.3 million (United States and Canada)

Fantasia is a 1940 American animated anthology film produced by Walt Disney Productions. The third Disney animated feature film, it consists of eight animated segments set to pieces of classical music conducted by Leopold Stokowski, seven of which are performed by the Philadelphia Orchestra. Music critic and composer Deems Taylor acts as the film's Master of Ceremonies who introduces each segment in live-action. The film's production was supervised by Walt Disney and Ben Sharpsteen, with story direction by Joe Grant and Dick Huemer.

Disney conceived the project in 1938 during the completion of The Sorcerer's Apprentice, which was originally planned as an elaborate Silly Symphony cartoon to revive the declining popularity of Mickey Mouse. When rising production costs threatened to outpace the short's potential revenue, Disney expanded the concept into a feature-length musical compilation with Stokowski and Taylor as collaborators. To accommodate the ambitious soundtrack, Disney and RCA developed Fantasound, a pioneering sound system that made Fantasia the first commercial film released in stereo and a precursor to surround sound.

Fantasia was first released as a theatrical roadshow that premiered at the Broadway Theatre in New York City on November 13, 1940. Disney funded and managed the roadshow himself until RKO Radio Pictures took over the roadshow distribution from April 1941, showing the film in a total of 13 U.S. cities. Despite widespread critical acclaim, the film was an initial box office failure. Its high production costs, the steep expense of leasing theatres and installing Fantasound equipment, and the loss of the European market due to World War II left the studio unable to turn a profit. Beginning in 1942, the film was reissued in a standard format by RKO and Buena Vista Distribution multiple times, with subsequent releases deleting, modifying, or restoring original footage and audio. Over time, these re-releases proved highly profitable; when adjusted for inflation, Fantasia ranks as the 23rd highest-grossing film of all time in the U.S.

Fantasia has since earned a reputation as one of the greatest animated films ever made. In 1990, it was selected for preservation in the U.S. National Film Registry by the Library of Congress for being "culturally, historically, or aesthetically significant." The American Film Institute ranked it as the 58th greatest American film overall in its 100 Years...100 Movies and the fifth greatest animated film on the 10 Top 10 list. The film's legacy has expanded into a multimedia franchise encompassing video games, theme park attractions, live concert tours, and the 1999 sequel, Fantasia 2000.

== Program ==
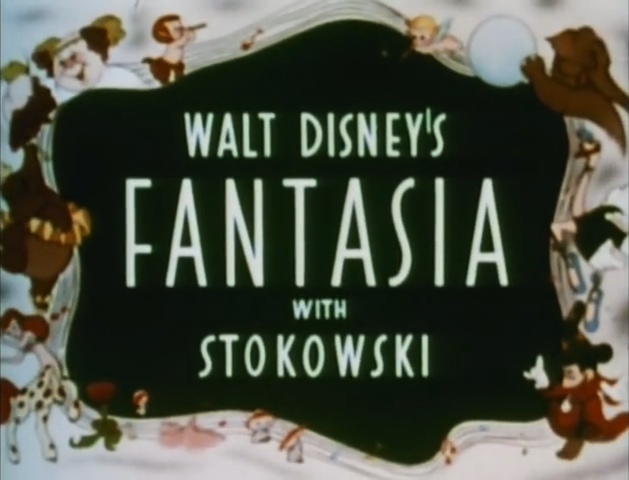
Title screen in the original theatrical trailer

Fantasia opens with live-action scenes of members of an orchestra gathering against a blue background and tuning their instruments in half-light, half-shadow. Master of ceremonies Deems Taylor enters the stage (also in half-light, half-shadow) and introduces the program.

- Toccata and Fugue in D Minor by Johann Sebastian Bach. Live-action shots of the orchestra illuminated in blue and gold, backed by superimposed shadows, fade into abstract patterns. Animated lines, shapes and cloud formations reflect the sound and rhythms of the music.
- The Nutcracker Suite by Pyotr Ilyich Tchaikovsky. Selections from the 1892 ballet suite underscore scenes depicting the changing of the seasons from summer to autumn to winter. A variety of dances are presented with fairies, fish, flowers, mushrooms, and leaves, including "Dance of the Sugar Plum Fairy", "Chinese Dance", "Arabian Dance", "Russian Dance", "Dance of the Flutes" and "Waltz of the Flowers".
- The Sorcerer's Apprentice by Paul Dukas. Based on Goethe's 1797 poem "Der Zauberlehrling". Mickey Mouse, the young apprentice of the sorcerer Yen Sid, attempts some of his master's magic tricks but does not know how to control them.
- The Rite of Spring by Igor Stravinsky. A visual history of the Earth's beginnings is depicted to selected sections of the ballet score. The sequence progresses from the planet's formation to the first living creatures, followed by the reign and extinction of the dinosaurs.
- Intermission/Meet the Soundtrack: The orchestra musicians depart and the Fantasia title card is revealed. After the intermission there is a brief jam session of jazz music led by a clarinettist as the orchestra members return. Then a humorously stylized demonstration of how sound is rendered on film is shown. An animated sound track "character", initially a straight white line, changes into different shapes and colors based on the sounds played.
- The Pastoral Symphony by Ludwig van Beethoven. A mythical Greco–Roman world of colorful centaurs and "centaurettes", cupids, fauns and other figures from classical mythology is portrayed to Beethoven's music. A gathering for a festival to honor Bacchus, the god of wine, is interrupted by Zeus, who creates a storm and directs Vulcan to forge lightning bolts for him to throw at the attendees.
- Dance of the Hours by Amilcare Ponchielli. A comic ballet in four sections: Madame Upanova and her ostriches (Morning); Hyacinth Hippo and her servants (Afternoon); Elephanchine and her bubble-blowing elephant troupe (Evening); and Ben Ali Gator and his troop of alligators (Night). The finale finds all of the characters dancing together until their palace collapses.
- Night on Bald Mountain by Modest Mussorgsky and Ave Maria by Franz Schubert. On Walpurgis Night, the giant devil Chernabog awakes and summons evil spirits and restless souls from their graves to Bald Mountain. The spirits dance and fly through the air until driven back by the sound of an Angelus bell as night fades into dawn. A chorus is heard singing Ave Maria as a line of robed monks is depicted walking with lighted torches through a forest and into the ruins of a cathedral.

== Production ==
=== Development ===
==== The Sorcerer's Apprentice and expansion to feature film ====
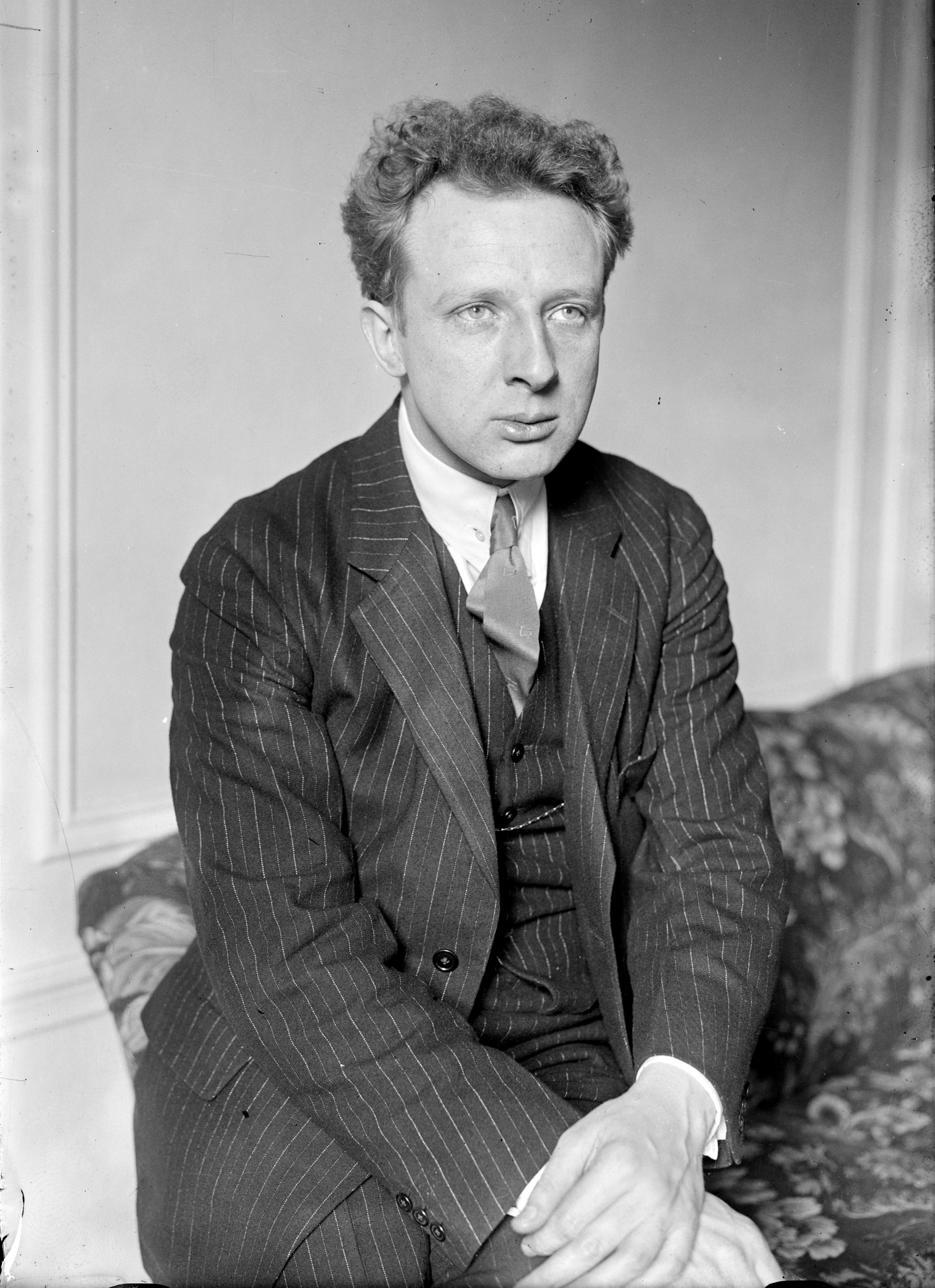
Leopold Stokowski conducted the film's score.

In 1936, while Snow White and the Seven Dwarfs was still in production, Walt Disney felt that his cartoon studio's star character Mickey Mouse needed a boost in popularity as newcomers Donald Duck and Goofy had become new favorites amongst audiences. He decided to star Mickey in The Sorcerer's Apprentice, a deluxe cartoon short based on Goethe's poem of the same name and set to the orchestral piece by Paul Dukas also inspired by the original tale. Although Disney had explored the concept of matching animation to classical music since 1928 with his Silly Symphony cartoons, he wanted to go beyond the usual slapstick in those shorts and produce ones where "sheer fantasy unfolds". Upon receiving the rights to use the Dukas piece in July 1937, Disney considered using a well-known conductor to record the music for added prestige. He happened to meet Leopold Stokowski, then the conductor of the Philadelphia Orchestra, at Chasen's restaurant in Hollywood and talked about his plans for the short. An enthusiastic Stokowski informed Disney that he liked the piece and offered to conduct for free.

Disney's New York representative met Stokowski on a subsequent train journey, and reported the conductor was serious in his offer and "had some very interesting ideas on instrumental coloring, which would be perfect for an animation medium." Disney felt "all steamed up over the idea" and thought the partnership "would be the means of a success and should lead to a new style of motion picture presentation." He had already begun working on a story outline and wished to use "the finest men ... from color ... down to animators" on the new short that was to be promoted as a special and unique film, outside of the Mickey Mouse cartoon series. On December 16, 1937, Stokowski signed a contract with Disney that allowed him to "select and employ a complete symphony orchestra" for the recording of The Sorcerer's Apprentice, and was paid $5,000 for his services. The three-hour recording session began at midnight on January 9, 1938 at Culver Studios in California, with 85 Hollywood musicians. When production costs surpassed $125,000, as much as four times greater than the average Silly Symphony, Disney and his brother Roy, who managed the studio's finances, realised that the short could never earn such a sum back on its own. Roy urged his brother to keep additional costs to a minimum "because of its very experimental and unprecedented nature ... we have no idea what can be expected from such a production." Ben Sharpsteen, a production supervisor on Fantasia, recalled that Disney "saw this trouble in the form of an opportunity. This was the birth of a new concept, a group of separate numbers—regardless of their running time—put together in a single presentation. It turned out to be a concert—something novel and of high quality."

Ideas to expand The Sorcerer's Apprentice and produce a full-length feature film began in February 1938, when inquiries were made to extend Stokowski's contract with the studio. In August, Disney asked Stokowski to return to the studios to help select musical pieces for the new film, which was initially titled The Concert Feature. Disney agreed to pay Stokowski $80,000 plus royalties for his services. The pair further thought of presenting the film with an on-screen host to introduce each number in the program. Both had heard composer and music critic Deems Taylor provide intermission commentary during radio broadcasts of the New York Philharmonic and agreed that he would be most suitable for the role. Disney did contact Taylor about the project and invited him to collaborate with Stokowski and himself, but by then work on Pinocchio, Bambi, and development on his new Burbank studio kept him too busy to work on the new feature. In a change of plans, Taylor was asked during a call on September 3, 1938, to come to the studios as soon as possible. He was paid $1,440 per week during his one-month visit.

==== Story meetings and program selection ====
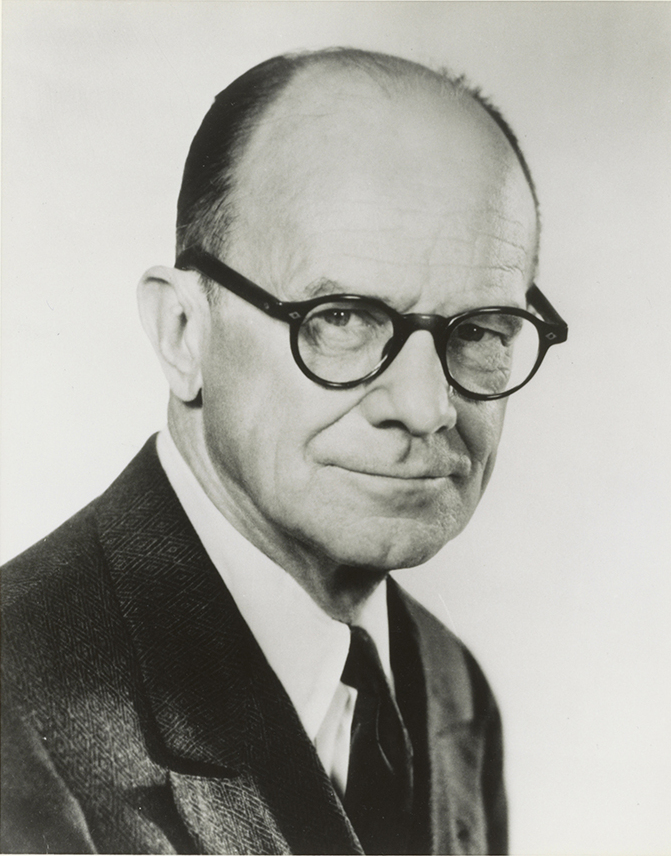
Deems Taylor was the film's Master of Ceremonies, who introduced each segment in live-action interstitial scenes.

The program for The Concert Feature was assembled in a series of meetings in September 1938. Disney made story writers Joe Grant and Dick Huemer gather a preliminary selection of music and along with Stokowski, Taylor, and the heads of various departments, discussed their ideas. Each meeting was recorded verbatim by stenographers with participants being given a copy of the entire conversation for review. As selections were considered, a recording of the piece was played back at the next gathering. Disney did not contribute much to early discussions; he admitted that his knowledge of music was instinctive and untrained. In one meeting, he inquired about a piece "on which we might build something of a prehistoric theme ... with animals". The group was considering The Firebird by Igor Stravinsky (which was used later in the sequel Fantasia 2000), but Taylor noted that his "Le Sacre du printemps would be something on that order", to which Disney replied upon hearing a recording, "This is marvelous! It would be perfect for prehistoric animals. There would be something terrific in dinosaurs, flying lizards, and prehistoric monsters. There could be beauty in the settings."

Numerous choices were discarded as talks continued, including Moto Perpetuo by Niccolò Paganini with "shots of dynamos, cogs, pistons" and "whirling wheels" to show the production of a collar button. Other deleted material included Prelude in G minor by Sergei Rachmaninoff, Troika by Tchaikovsky, and a rendition of "The Song of the Flea" by Mussorgsky, which was to be sung by Lawrence Tibbett. On September 29, 1938, around sixty of Disney's artists gathered for a two-and-a-half hour piano concert while he provided a running commentary about the new musical feature. A rough version of The Sorcerer's Apprentice was also shown that, according to one attendee, had the crowd applauding and cheering "until their hands were red". The final pieces were chosen the following morning, which included Toccata and Fugue in D minor, Cydalise et le Chèvre-pied by Gabriel Pierné, The Nutcracker Suite, Night on Bald Mountain, Ave Maria, Dance of the Hours, Clair de Lune by Claude Debussy, The Rite of Spring and The Sorcerer's Apprentice. Disney had already begun working out the details for the segments, and showed greater enthusiasm and eagerness as opposed to his anxiety while starting on the problematic Pinocchio.

Clair de Lune was soon removed from the program, and Disney and his writers encountered problems of setting a concrete story to Cydalise. Its opening march, "The Entry of the Little Fauns", attracted Disney to the piece which at first provided suitable depictions of fauns he wanted. On January 5, 1939, following a search for a stronger piece to fit the mythological theme, the piece was replaced with sections of Beethoven's sixth symphony. Stokowski disagreed with the switch, believing that Disney's "idea of mythology ... is not quite what this symphony is about". He was also concerned about the reception from classical music enthusiasts who would criticize Disney for venturing too far from the composer's intent. Taylor on the other hand welcomed the change, describing it as "a stunning one", and saw "no possible objection to it".

The new feature continued to be known as The Concert Feature or Musical Feature as late as November 1938. Hal Horne, a publicist for Disney's film distributor RKO Radio Pictures, wished for a different title, and gave the suggestion Filmharmonic Concert. Stuart Buchanan then held a contest at the studio for a title that produced almost 1,800 suggestions, but the favorite among the film's supervisors was Fantasia, an early working title. Horne said: "It isn't the word alone but the meaning we read into it." From the beginning of its development, Disney expressed the greater importance of music in Fantasia compared to his past work: "In our ordinary stuff, our music is always under action, but on this ... we're supposed to be picturing this music—not the music fitting our story." Disney had hoped that the film would bring classical music to people who, like himself, had previously "walked out on this kind of stuff".

=== Segments ===
More than 1,000 artists and technicians were used in the making of Fantasia, which features more than 500 animated characters. Segments were color-keyed scene by scene so the colors in a single shot would harmonize between preceding and following ones. Before a segment's narrative pattern was complete, an overall color scheme was designed to the general mood of the music, and patterned to correspond with the development of the subject matter. The studio's character model department sculpted three-dimensional clay models so the animators could view their subject from all angles. The live action scenes were filmed using the three-strip Technicolor process, while the animated segments were shot in successive yellow, cyan and magenta-exposed frames. The different pieces of film were then spliced together to form a complete print. A multiplane camera that could handle seven levels, three more than the studio's original model, was built specifically for the film. Fantasia has 3,500 feet (1,100 m) of multiplane footage, more than Snow White and the Seven Dwarfs and Pinocchio combined.

==== Toccata and Fugue in D Minor ====
Disney had been interested in producing abstract animation since he saw A Colour Box by Len Lye from 1935. He explained the work done in the Toccata and Fugue was "no sudden idea ... they were something we had nursed along several years but we never had a chance to try." Preliminary designs included those from effects animator Cy Young, who produced drawings influenced by the patterns on the edge of a piece of sound film. In late 1938, Disney hired Oskar Fischinger, a German artist who had produced numerous abstract animated films, including some with classical music, to work with Young. Upon review of three leica reels produced by the two, Disney rejected all three. According to Huemer, all Fischinger "did was little triangles and designs ... it didn't come off at all. Too dinky, Walt said." Fischinger, like Disney, was used to having full control over his work and not used to working in a group. Feeling his designs were too abstract for a mass audience, Fischinger left the studio in apparent despair, before the segment was completed, in October 1939. Disney had plans to make the Toccata and Fugue an experimental three-dimensional film, with audiences being given cardboard stereoscopic frames with their souvenir programs, but this idea was abandoned.

==== The Nutcracker Suite ====
In The Nutcracker Suite, animator Art Babbitt is said to have credited The Three Stooges as a guide for animating the dancing mushrooms in the Chinese Dance routine. He drew with a music score pinned to his desk to work out the choreography so he could relate the action to the melody and the counterpoint, "those nasty little notes underneath ... so something has to be related to that". The studio filmed professional dancers Joyce Coles and Marjorie Belcher wearing ballet skirts that resembled shapes of blossoms that were to sit above water for Dance of the Flutes. An Arabian dancer was also brought in to study the movements for the goldfish in Arab Dance. Jules Engel also worked on the choreography and color-keying for this sequence. To avoid hard ink outlines, new techniques like transparent paint was used on the cels. The snowflakes used in the snowflake fairies sequence was difficult to draw by hand, so a man named Leonard Pickley, from the Special Effects Department, came up with the idea of using stop-motion animation. Diagrams of real snowflakes were traced by the Ink and Paint Department, who used a material a little heavier than regular cels, and painted them in translucent white. They were then cut out and placed on revolving spools attached to small steel rails. The mechanics was hidden under black velvet as the snowflakes were moved one frame at a time. The hand-drawn animation was added later.

==== The Sorcerer's Apprentice ====
Disney acting out a scene in The Sorcerer's Apprentice for Taylor and Stokowski

Animation on The Sorcerer's Apprentice began on January 21, 1938, when James Algar, the director of the segment, assigned animator Preston Blair to work on the scene when Mickey Mouse wakes from his dream. Each of the seven hundred members of staff at the time received a synopsis of Goethe's 1797 poem Der Zauberlehrling, and were encouraged to complete a twenty-question form that requested their ideas on what action might take place. Early on Disney considered using Dopey from Snow White and the Seven Dwarfs as the apprentice, but he did not want to dilute the impact of his debut feature and chose Mickey Mouse (who was redesigned for the film). Stokowski suggested the cartoon could star "an entirely new personality" that represented "in the mind and heart of everyone seeing the film their own personality, so that they would enter into all the drama and emotional changes of the film in a most intense manner"; Disney rejected this also. In its original form the segment opened with an overture followed by live action shots of Stokowski conducting in silhouette, filming for which took place in January 1938 with cinematographer James Wong Howe.

Layout artist Tom Codrick created what Dick Huemer described as "brilliantly colored thumbnails" from preliminary storyboard sketches using gouache paints, which featured bolder use of color and lighting than any previous Disney short. Mickey was redesigned by animator Fred Moore who added pupils to his eyes for the first time to achieve greater ranges of expression. Most of the segment was shot in live action, including a scene where a UCLA athlete was asked to run and jump across one of the studio's sound stages with barrels in the way, which was used for reference when Mickey traverses through water. English silent film actor Nigel De Brulier was hired to portray Yen Sid for the camera for the animators to use for reference. A sorcerer's robe and hat was bought from a costume rental shop and decorated with stars and crescent moons.

==== The Rite of Spring ====
An early concept for The Rite of Spring was to extend the story to the age of mammals and the first humans and the discovery of fire and man's triumph. John Hubley, the segment's art director, explained that it was later curtailed by Disney to avoid controversy from creationists, who promised to make trouble should he connect evolution with humans. To gain a better understanding of the history of the planet the studio received guidance from Roy Chapman Andrews, the director of the American Museum of Natural History; English biologist Julian Huxley; paleontologist Barnum Brown; and astronomer Edwin Hubble. Animators studied comets and nebulae at the Mount Wilson Observatory; they also observed a herd of iguanas and a baby alligator that were brought into the studio. The viewpoint was kept low throughout the segment to heighten the immensity of the dinosaurs.

==== The Pastoral Symphony ====
According to Ward Kimball, the animators were "extremely specific on touchy issues". The female centaurs were originally drawn bare-breasted, but the Hays office enforcing the Motion Picture Production Code insisted that they discreetly hung garlands around the necks. The male centaurs were also toned down to appear less intimidating to the audience. Originally, the segment included a pair of black centaurs who tended to the others, but these were cut from the film in later releases due to their implications of racism. (see § Controversies).

==== Dance of the Hours ====
Dance of the Hours was directed by Norman Ferguson and Thornton Hee and was completed by eleven animators. Most of the story was outlined in a meeting in October 1938, including the creation of the main alligator character, Ben Ali Gator. Its story, direction, layout, and animation underwent several rewrites, yet Disney wanted to present animals performing a legitimate caricature ballet sequence with comedic "slips". The design of the elephants and alligators were based on those by German illustrator Heinrich Kley, while the hippos and ostriches were based on those by cartoonist T. S. Sullivant. To gain a better idea on the animals' movements, the crew visited Griffith Park Zoo in Los Angeles. Animator John Hench was assigned to work on the segment, but resisted as he knew little about ballet. Disney then gave Hench season tickets to the Ballet Russe de Monte Carlo with backstage access so he could learn more about it.

The studio filmed several people in live action to help with the animation of the characters. The lead ostrich, Madmoiselle Upanova, is based on Irina Baronova. Hyacinth Hippo, the prima ballerina, was inspired by dancers Marge Champion and Tatiana Riabouchinska and actress Hattie Noel who weighed over 200 pounds (91 kg), the animators studying the "least quiver of her flesh, noticing those parts of her anatomy that were subjected to the greatest stress and strain". Champion's dance partner Louis Hightower modeled for Ben Ali Gator, and Riabouchinska's husband David Lichine was used for his movements.

==== Night on Bald Mountain and Ave Maria ====
Night on Bald Mountain was directed by Wilfred Jackson. Its story closely follows the descriptions that Mussorgsky had written on his original score of the tone poem. Chernabog was animated by Vladimir "Bill" Tytla, his design inspired from a pencil sketch by Swiss artist Albert Hurter of a demon sitting atop a mountain unfolding its wings. Despite Hurter never producing animation for Disney, the studio temporarily hired him to produce pencil sketches for the animators to gain inspiration from. Chernabog and parts of the segment were developed further by Danish-born illustrator Kay Nielsen. Tytla conducted research on all the characters he had animated and being Ukrainian, was familiar with the folklore that the story detailed. Actor Béla Lugosi, best known for his role in Dracula (1931), was brought in to provide reference poses for Chernabog, but Tytla disliked the results. He then got Jackson to pose shirtless which gave him the images he needed. At one point in its development, the idea of using black cats to represent evil was considered, but Disney rejected it as he thought cats had always been used.

The film's program reads that Ave Maria provides "an emotional relief to audiences tense from the shock" of Night on Bald Mountain. Disney did not want much animated movement, but wanted the segment to bring the background artwork to the forefront which became a showcase for the multiplane camera. An early story outline had the segment end with a Madonna presented on the screen with the clouds, but Disney decided against this as he did not want to suggest overly religious imagery. There were ideas of releasing scents throughout the theater during Fantasia, including the smell of incense during Ave Maria.

The final shot, beginning with a black foreground and a shining white light in the background, measured 217 feet (66 m) of film; according to Disney historian John Culhane, this was likely the longest continuous scene in animation history to date. Ed Gershman, who worked on the segment, described how the animation of the procession figures was so closely drawn, "a difference in the width of a pencil line was more than enough to cause jitters, not only to the animation, but to everyone connected with the sequence." The jittering created on the first shoot led Disney to order a time-consuming and expensive redo. The studio had no camera that moved slowly and continuously enough to film the segment as Disney wanted, so a custom horizontal camera crane was built that accommodated glass panes 4 feet (1.2 m) wide, with the artwork painted on them, so they could be shifted out of the way as the camera tracked through. Workers shot continuously for six days and nights, but following processing they discovered the camera was fitted with the wrong type of lens and had photographed the track, stands, and themselves. Three days into the third reshoot, a minor earthquake rocked the wooden stands and panels that kept the glass panes in place. Rather than carry on with the risk of jittered footage, they started over for a fourth time and completed one day before the film's premiere. The finished film was rushed to New York on a charter plane and spliced into place with four hours to spare.

==== Live-action ====
The live action segments were the first to be filmed inside Stage 1, an 11,000-square-foot production sound stage built at Disney's Burbank studios in 1940; the facility was subsequently named and dedicated to the film until 2013. Although the film's narrative frames the on-screen musicians as members of the Philadelphia Orchestra, they were actually local session players. Among them were Disney sound effects artist Jimmy MacDonald on timpani and composer Paul Smith on violin. Taylor's introductions were filmed in August 1940 with James Wong Howe returning as cinematographer. To infuse visual energy into the segments, Howe projected brief flashes of color onto the instruments as the musicians tuned up, altering the hue of the side lighting for each introduction to provide a variety of effects. During the intermission, a jazz jam session incorporates a theme from Beethoven's Pastoral Symphony alongside "Bach Goes to Town", a jazz tune popularized by Benny Goodman. Film scholar David Butler highlights the significance of this brief interlude, noting that it demonstrated to the audience that "these musicians aren't serious all the time" while positioning jazz as an "antidote to serious music."

In 1940, Ub Iwerks rejoined the Disney studio as a technical supervisor for special visual effects, receiving the handshake scene between Mickey Mouse and Stokowski as one of his first assignments. This was achieved by filming Stokowski shaking hands in thin air. Animators then placed drawing paper directly over the photographic prints to match Mickey’s movements to the live action footage. To combine the sequences into a single negative, the completed animation was photographed with the Stokowski film loaded directly inside the camera.

=== Soundtrack ===
Fantasia

Film score by Various artists
- Released: 1940
- Label: Disneyland Records

==== Recording ====
Disney wanted to experiment in more sophisticated sound recording and reproduction techniques for Fantasia. He said: "Music emerging from one speaker behind the screen sounds thin, tinkly and strainy. We wanted to reproduce such beautiful masterpieces ... so that audiences would feel as though they were standing at the podium with Stokowski". The Sorcerer's Apprentice was recorded in a three-hour session that began at midnight at the Culver Studios on January 9, 1938. The venue was chosen as the sound stage at the Disney studio at Hyperion Avenue was too small. Stokowski picked the 85 musicians himself, and felt they would be more alert by working at such a late hour. The session involved a single rehearsal. Engineers at Disney collaborated with RCA Corporation that involved recording with multiple audio channels to allow any desired dynamic balance to be achieved upon playback. The stage was altered acoustically with double plywood semi-circular partitions that separated the orchestra into five sections and acted as a baffle wall to increase reverberation. Chief Disney sound engineer William Garity was "very disappointed" with the overall results and was unable to have a full complete rehearsal and record the orchestra in separate sections as scheduled, but Stokowski insisted the recording was satisfactory.

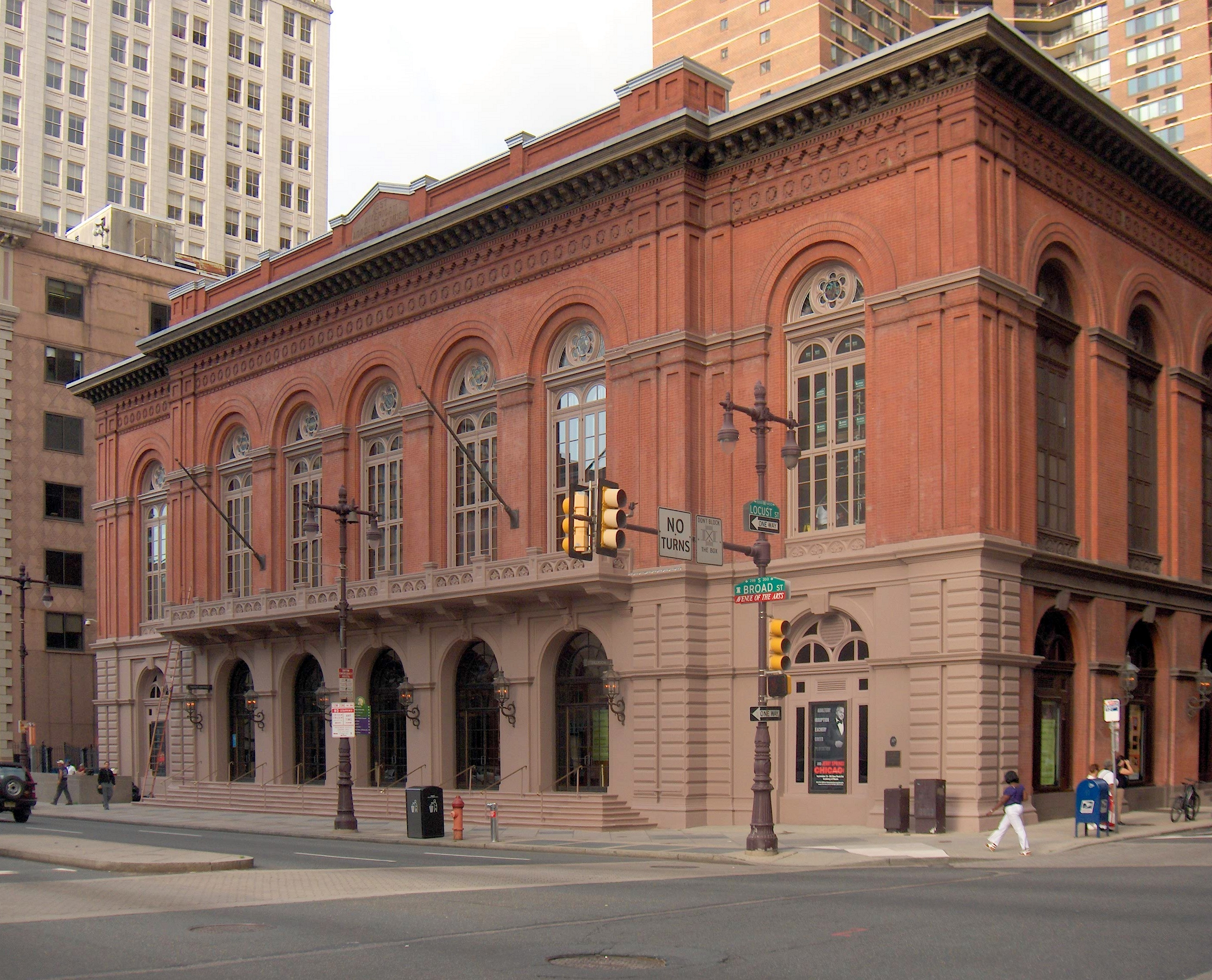
With exception to The Sorcerer's Apprentice, the film's score was recorded at the Philadelphia Academy of Music.

On January 18, 1939, Stokowski signed an eighteen-month contract with Disney to conduct the remaining pieces with the Philadelphia Orchestra. The main recording sessions took place on April 6, 8, and 12, each three hours in length, at the Academy of Music, the orchestra's home which was chosen for its favourable acoustics. The 90-piece orchestra included some students at the Curtis Institute of Music, and each musician was paid a flat fee of $10 per hour with principal players receiving as much as $400. Ave Maria features Westminster Choir College under the supervision of Charles E. Henderson, and college affiliate Julietta Novis as the soprano solo. Disney commissioned American author Rachel Field to produce a set of original lyrics in English specifically for Fantasia, of which just one verse is sung in the film. Disney paid almost $18,000 towards the musician's wages, stage personnel, a music librarian, and the orchestra's manager.

Disney and RCA decided to abandon the multi-channel setup used on The Sorcerer's Apprentice and devised a more sophisticated one for the Academy sessions. Thirty-three microphones were placed around the orchestra that captured the music onto eight optical sound recording machines placed in the hall's basement, where engineers followed the music in real time and muted microphones when their assigned section was not playing. Each one represented an audio channel that focused on a different section of instruments: cellos and basses, violins, brass, violas, and woodwinds and tympani. The seventh channel was a combination of the first six while the eighth provided an overall sound of the orchestra at a distance. A ninth channel provided a click track function for the animators to time their drawings to the music. The film stock had to be stored in a truck parked outside the Academy as the highly flammable material posed a fire risk for the wooden basement. When the finished recordings arrived at the studio, a meeting was held on July 14, 1939, to allow the artists working on each segment to listen to Stokowski's arrangements, and suggest alterations in the sound to work more effectively with their designs. Some solo parts were subsequently re-recorded in California, but still under Stokowski's direction. In the 42 days it took to record, edit, and produce the final mix 483,000 feet (147,000 m) of film was used in the process.

==== Fantasound ====
The Disney brothers contacted David Sarnoff of RCA regarding the manufacture of a new system that would "create the illusion that the actual symphony orchestra is playing in the theater." Sarnoff backed out at first for financial reasons, but agreed in July 1939 to make the equipment so long as the Disneys could hold down the estimated $200,000 in costs (equivalent to about $4.6 million in 2025). Though it was not exactly known how to achieve their goal, engineers at Disney and RCA investigated many ideas and tests made with various equipment setups. The collaboration led to the development of Fantasound, a pioneering stereophonic surround sound system which innovated some processes widely used today, including simultaneous multitrack recording, overdubbing, and noise reduction.

Fantasound, developed in part by Garity, employed two projectors running at the same time. With one containing the picture film with a mono soundtrack for backup purposes, the other ran a sound film that was mixed from the nine tracks recorded at the Academy to four: three of which contained the audio for the left, center, and right stage speakers respectively, while the fourth became a control track with amplitude and frequency tones that drove variable-gain amplifiers to control the volume of the three audio tracks. In addition were three "house" speakers placed on the left, right, and center of the auditorium that derived from the left and right stage channels which acted as surround channels. As the original recording was captured at almost peak modulation to increase signal-to-noise ratio, the control track was used to restore the dynamics to where Stokowski thought they should be. To address this deficiency, engineers designed and built TOGAD - the Tone-Operated Gain Adjusting Device - to control the levels of each of the three audio tracks through the amplifiers.

The illusion of sound traveling across the speakers was achieved with a device named the "pan pot", which directed the predetermined movement of each audio channel with the control track. Mixing of the soundtrack required six people to operate the various pan pots in real time, while Stokowski directed each level and pan change which was marked on his musical score. To monitor recording levels, Disney used oscilloscopes with color differentiation to minimize eye fatigue. To test recording equipment and speaker systems, Disney ordered eight electronic oscillators from the newly established Hewlett-Packard company. Between the individual takes, prints, and remakes, approximately three million feet of sound film was used in the production of Fantasia. Almost a fifth of the film's budget was spent on its recording techniques.

== Release history ==
=== Theatrical runs ===
==== 1940–1941 roadshows with Fantasound ====
Film trailer

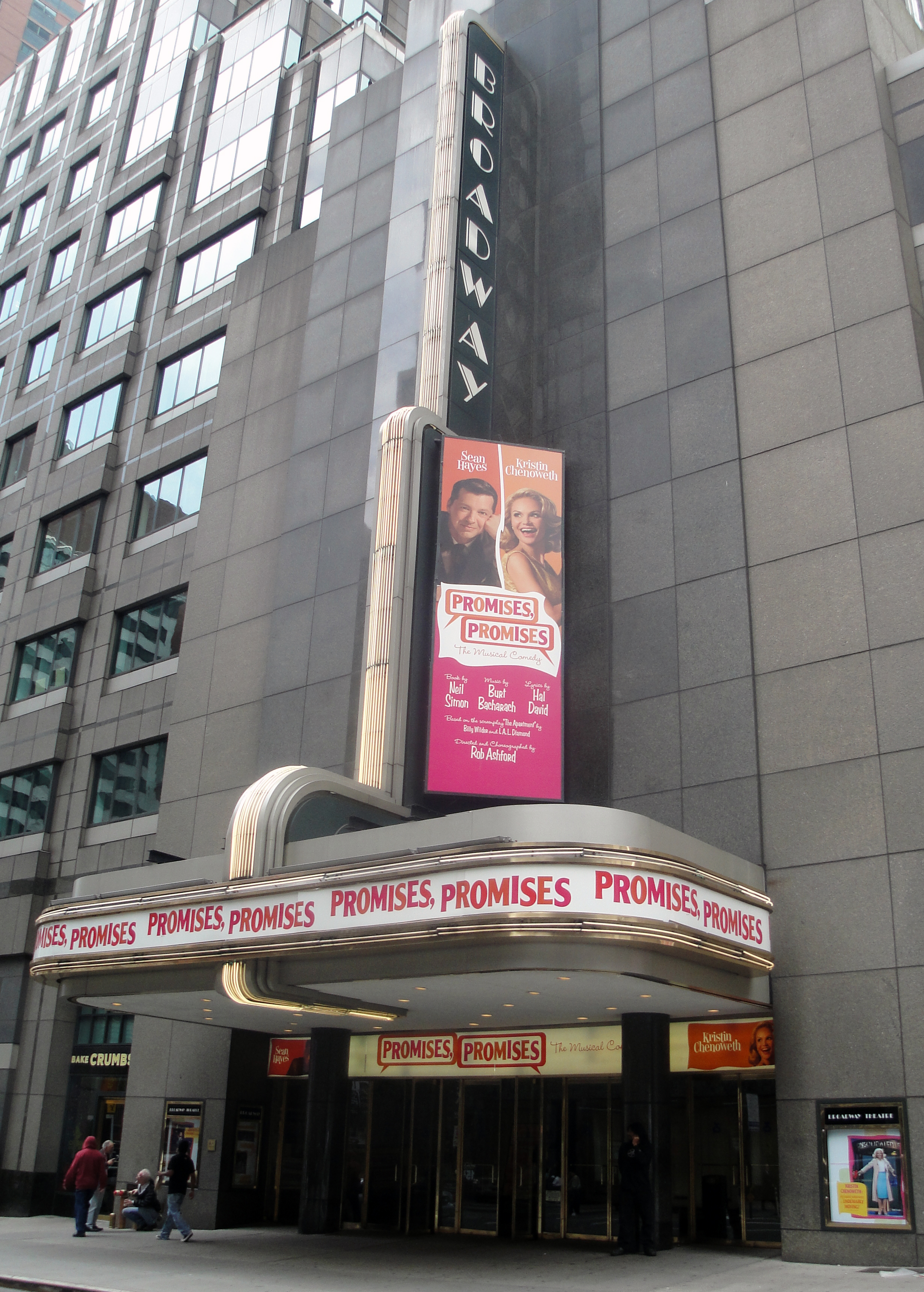
The film's first roadshow opened at the Broadway Theatre in New York City on November 13, 1940.

RKO balked at the idea of distributing Fantasia, which it described as a "longhair musical", and believed its duration of two hours and five minutes plus intermission was too long for a general release. It relaxed its exclusive distribution contract with Disney, who wanted a more prestigious exhibit in the form of a limited-run roadshow attraction. A total of thirteen roadshows were held across the United States; each involving two daily screenings with seat reservations booked in advance at higher prices and a fifteen-minute intermission. Disney hired film salesman Irving Ludwig to manage the first eleven engagements, and he was given specific instructions regarding each aspect of the film's presentation, including the setup of outside theater marquees and curtain and lighting cues. Patrons were taken to their seats by staff hired and trained by Disney, and were given a program booklet illustrated by Gyo Fujikawa.

The first roadshow opened at the Broadway Theatre in New York City on November 13, 1940, the same theater where Steamboat Willie appeared 12 years earlier. The Disneys had secured a year's lease with the venue that was fully equipped with Fantasound, which took personnel a week working around the clock to install. Proceeds made on the night went to the British War Relief Society following the Battle of Britain. Ticket demand was so great that eight telephone operators were employed to handle the extra calls while the adjoining store was rented out to cater the box office bookings. Fantasia ran at the Broadway for forty-nine consecutive weeks, the longest run achieved by a film at the time. Its run continued for a total of fifty-seven weeks until February 28, 1942.

The remaining twelve roadshows were held throughout 1941, which included a 39-week run at the Carthay Circle Theatre in Los Angeles from January 29. Fantasia broke the long-run record at the venue in its twenty-eighth week; a record previously held by Gone with the Wind. Its eight-week run at the Fulton Theatre in Pittsburgh attracted over 50,000 people with reservations being made from cities located one hundred miles from the venue. Engagements were also held at the Geary Theatre in San Francisco for eight months, the Hanna Theatre in Cleveland for nine weeks, the Majestic Theatre in Boston, the Apollo Theater in Chicago, and also in Philadelphia, Detroit, Buffalo, Minneapolis, Washington, D.C., and Baltimore.

Fantasia grossed over $300,000 in the first sixteen weeks in New York; over $20,000 in the opening five weeks in San Francisco; and almost the same amount in the first ten weeks both in Los Angeles and Boston. The first eleven roadshows earned a total of $1.3 million by April 1941, but the $85,000 in production and installation costs of a single Fantasound setup, along with theatres having to be leased, forced Disney to exceed their loan limits. The onset of the Second World War prevented plans for a potential release in Europe, normally the source of as much as forty-five per cent of the studio's income. Up to eighty-eight engagements were outlined across five years, but wartime demands for material limited the number of Fantasound prints to sixteen. All but one of the Fantasound setups were dismantled and given to the war effort. Upon acquiring the film's distribution rights in April 1941, RKO initially continued the roadshow booking policy but presented the film in mono, which was easier to exhibit. The combined average receipts from each roadshow was around $325,000, which placed Fantasia at an even greater loss than Pinocchio.

==== 1942–1963 runs ====
Disney allowed RKO to handle the general release of Fantasia, but fought their decision to have the film cut. He gave in as the studio needed as much income as possible to remedy its finances, but refused to cut it himself, "You can get anybody you want to edit it ... I can't do it." With no input from Disney, musical director Ed Plumb and Ben Sharpsteen reduced Fantasia to one hour and forty minutes at first, then to one hour and twenty minutes by removing most of Taylor's commentary and the Toccata and Fugue. Fantasia was re-released in January 1942 at more popular prices with a mono soundtrack, and was placed on the lower half of double bills with the Western film Valley of the Sun.

RKO reissued Fantasia once more on September 1, 1946, with the animated sequences complete and the scenes of Taylor, Stokowski, and the orchestra restored but shortened. Its running time was restored to one hour and fifty-five minutes. This edit would be the standard form for subsequent re-releases, and was the basis for the 1990 restoration.

I wanted a special show just like Cinerama plays today ... I had Fantasia set for a wide screen. I had dimensional sound ... To get that wide screen I had the projector running sideways ... I had the double frame. But I didn't get to building my cameras or my projectors because the money problem came in ... The compromise was that it finally went out standard with dimensional sound. I think if I'd had the money and I could have gone ahead I'd have a really sensational show at that time.

— Walt Disney on the widescreen release in 1956.

By 1955, the original sound negatives began to deteriorate, though a four-track copy had survived in good condition. Using the remaining Fantasound system at the studio, a three-track stereo copy was transferred across noise-free telephone wires onto magnetic film at an RCA facility in Hollywood. This copy was used when Fantasia was reissued in stereo by Buena Vista Distribution in SuperScope, a derivative of the anamorphic widescreen CinemaScope format, on February 7, 1956. The projector featured an automatic control mechanism designed by Disney engineers that was coupled to a variable anamorphic lens, which allowed the picture to switch between its Academy standard aspect ratio of 1.33:1 to the wide ratio of 2.35:1 in twenty seconds without a break in the film. This was achieved by placing the cues that controlled the mechanism on a separate track in addition to the three audio channels. Only selected parts of the animation were stretched, while all live action scenes remained unchanged. This reissue garnered some criticism from viewers, as the widescreen format led to the cropping and reframing of the images.

On February 20, 1963, Fantasia was re-released in both standard and SuperScope versions with stereo sound, though existing records are unclear. Its running time was 56 seconds longer than the previous issue which is unexplained. This was the final release that occurred before Disney's (and Taylor's) death in 1966.

==== 1969–1990 runs ====
1969 psychedelic-style re-release poster

Fantasia began to make a profit from its $2.28 million budget after its return to theaters on December 17, 1969. The film was promoted with a psychedelic-styled advertising campaign, and it became popular among teenagers and college students who reportedly appreciated it as a psychedelic experience. Animator Ollie Johnston recalled that young people "thought we were on a trip when we made it ... every time we'd go to talk to a school or something, they'd ask us what we were on." The release is also noted for the removal of four scenes from The Pastoral Symphony over racial stereotyping. Fantasia was issued on a regular basis, typically for exhibition in art houses in college towns, until the mid-1970s.

The film was reissued nationwide once more on April 15, 1977 (the same year as Stokowski's death), this time with simulated stereo sound. This edit featured the RKO distribution logo being replaced with that of Buena Vista Distribution, since RKO had not been part of a release since 1946. It had not been removed earlier as the credit sequence would have required to be re-shot. A two-and-a-half-minute reduction in the film's running time in this version remains unclear in existing records.

In 1980, the studio shipped a damaged segment of The Nutcracker Suite to various film restoration companies; each advised that the sound recording could not be upgraded to a quality suitable for theatre screenings. In late 1981, Disney executives decided to replace the Stokowski soundtrack with a new, digital recording in Dolby Stereo with conductor Irwin Kostal; president and CEO Ron W. Miller said that the original had degraded and "no longer matched the extraordinary visuals." Kostal directed a hand-picked 121-piece orchestra and 50-voice choir for the recording that took place across 18, three-hour sessions in January 1982 at CBS Studio Center in Los Angeles, costing almost $1.4 million to produce. Five musicians who took part in the 1940 recording performed on the new one. Kostal had the difficult task of pacing his conducting to match Stokowski's, but chose Mussorgsky's orchestration of Night on Bald Mountain instead of the arrangement Stokowski had used which was based on Nikolay Rimsky-Korsakov's version. The new recording also corrected a two-frame lag in projection caused by the recording techniques used at the time the film was made. The Kostal soundtrack was prepared for the film's reissue from April 2, 1982, which had Taylor's scenes replaced with briefer voiceover narration from Hugh Douglas as the studio felt audiences by now had become "more sophisticated and knowledgeable about music." Mickey Mouse and Stokowski's voices in the handshake scene were also redubbed, the former by Wayne Allwine, who would do so again in Fantasia 2000's version of the same scene.

The 1982 version was reissued from February 1985, which kicked off with a run at the Plitt Century Plaza Theatre in Los Angeles that was fitted with the HPS-4000 digital speaker system. This allowed the digital stereo recording of the Kostal soundtrack to be presented for the first time, and made Fantasia the first theatrical feature film presented in digital stereo sound. The standard recording was used for the film's wide release to around 400 theaters. This time, actor Tim Matheson provided the narration.

For its fiftieth anniversary reissue, Fantasia underwent a two-year restoration process that began with a six-month search to locate the original negatives, which had been in storage since 1946, and piece them together. This was the first time since then that a print of the film had been prepared using the original negative and not a copy. A new print was formed that was identical to the 1946 version with Taylor's introductions restored but with a new end credits sequence added. As the original opening shots of Rite of Spring could not be found, footage from the Disney educational film A World is Born, which used footage from the segment, was used instead. This was also the case for a sequence in The Pastoral Symphony, so a duplicate was used. Each of the 535,680 frames were restored by hand with an untouched print from 1951 used for guidance on the correct colors and tone. Theaters that agreed to screen the film were required to install specific stereo sound equipment and present it in its original 1.33:1 aspect ratio. The 1990 reissue also had the Stokowski soundtrack restored, which underwent digital remastering by Terry Porter who worked with the 1955 magnetic soundtrack. He estimated 3,000 pops and hisses were removed from the recording. Released on October 5, 1990, the reissue grossed $25 million domestically.

=== Home media ===
==== Audio ====
Disney considered releasing the film's soundtrack around the time of the film's roadshow release, but this idea was not realized. The soundtrack was first released as a mono three LP set in sixteen countries by Disneyland and Buena Vista Records in 1957, containing the musical pieces without the narration. A stereo edition LP was issued by Buena Vista Records in 1961. Disney was required to obtain permission from Stokowski, who said he would not allow its sale unless the Philadelphia Orchestra Association received a share of the royalties.

The Kostal recording was released on two CDs, two LPs and two audio cassettes by Buena Vista Records, in 1982.

In September 1990, the remastered Stokowski soundtrack was released on CD and audio cassette by Buena Vista Records., and was later re-released in 2006. In the United States, it debuted the Billboard 200 chart at number 190, its peak position, for the week of November 17, 1990. Two months after its release, the album was certified gold by the Recording Industry Association of America (RIAA) for 500,000 copies sold in the United States. In January 1993, it was certified platinum for sales in excess of one million copies.

For the film's 75th anniversary in 2015, the Stokowski and Kostal recordings were released by Walt Disney Records on a four-disc album as the fifth volume of The Legacy Collection. The set includes Stokowski's recording of the deleted Clair de Lune segment, and a recording of The Sorcerer's Apprentice and Peter and the Wolf (from Make Mine Music) with added narration by Sterling Holloway; he himself narrated the latter originally.

==== Video ====
Fantasia has received four home video releases. The first, featuring the 1990 restored theatrical version, was released on VHS, Betamax and LaserDisc on November 1, 1991, as part of the Walt Disney Classics line. The original soundtrack returned when Fantasound was also recreated in Dolby Stereo for the film's 1990 theatrical release. The result, named "Fantasound 90," was used as a basis of the audio for these releases. The release was limited to just 50 days, prompting 9.25 million advance orders for cassettes and a record 200,000 for discs, doubling the figure of the previous record. The "Deluxe Edition" package included the film, a "making of" feature, a commemorative lithograph, a 16-page booklet, a two-disc soundtrack of the Stokowski score, and a certificate of authenticity signed by Roy E. Disney, the nephew of Walt. In 1992, Fantasia became the biggest-selling sell-through cassette of all time in the US with 14.2 million copies being purchased. The record was surpassed later that year by Beauty and the Beast. It was also the UK's top selling video at the time, with sales of 3 million. By October 1994, 21.7 million copies of the video had been sold worldwide.

In November 2000, Fantasia was released on video for the second time, this time along with Fantasia 2000, on DVD with 5.1 surround sound. The films were issued both separately and in a three-disc set called The Fantasia Anthology. A variety of bonus features were included in the bonus disc, The Fantasia Legacy. This edition attempted to follow as closely as possible the runtime and format of the original roadshow version, and included additional restored live action footage of Taylor and the orchestra, including the bookends to the film's intermission. In addition to these changes, this DVD release would be THX certified. Since the 2000 release, Taylor's voice was re-recorded throughout by Corey Burton because most of the audio tracks to Taylor's restored scenes had deteriorated to the point that they could no longer be used. Oddly, the UK DVD release from this period still used the 1990 theatrical version for its video content, albeit with the new audio restoration from the US version,; some of the music however was not synced up properly in certain scenes on the UK DVD, such as the climax of The Rite of Spring.

Both films were reissued again by Walt Disney Studios Home Entertainment in November 2010 separately, as a two-disc DVD/Blu-ray set and a combined DVD and Blu-ray four-disc set (named the "Fantasia 2 Movie Collection") that featured 1080p high-definition video and 7.1 surround sound. The 2010 version of Fantasia featured a new restoration by Reliance MediaWorks and a new sound restoration, but was editorially identical to the 2000 version. This also marked the first time in Europe, where it was originally denied a release due to the war, that the roadshow version was released. Fantasia was withdrawn from release and returned to the "Disney Vault" moratorium on April 30, 2011.

In 2021, both films, along with the 2018 compilation Celebrating Mickey, a collection of 13 Mickey Mouse shorts, were reissued on DVD, Blu-ray, and digitally as part of the U.S. Disney Movie Club exclusive The Best of Mickey Collection. They were also released for the first time on multiple U.S. purchased streaming platforms, including Movies Anywhere and its retailers.

== Reception ==
=== Critical response ===
==== Early reviews ====
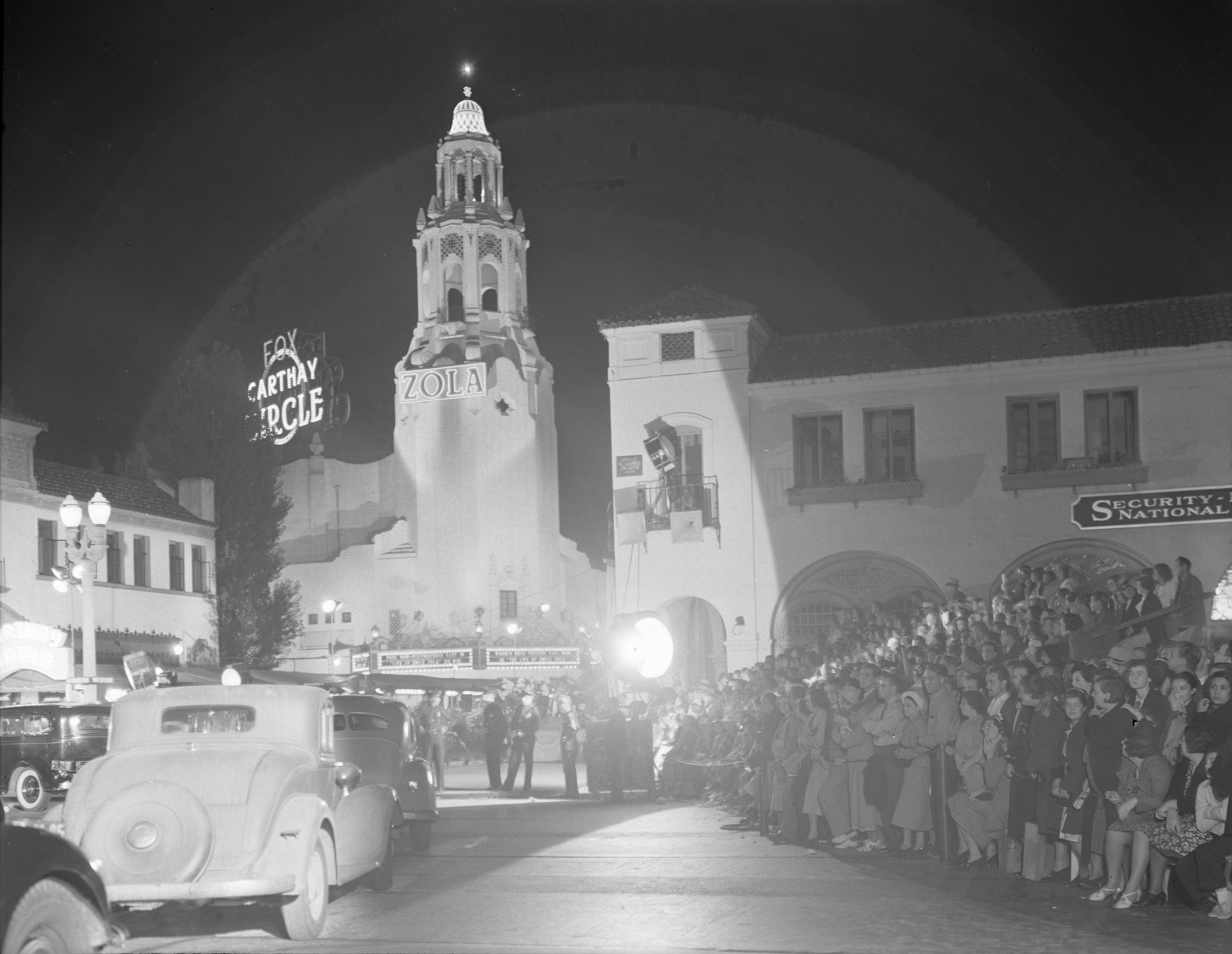
The film opened at the Carthay Circle Theatre on January 30, 1941.

Fantasia garnered significant critical acclaim at the time of release and was seen by some critics as a masterpiece. The West Coast premiere at the Carthay Circle Theatre was a grand affair, attracting some 5000 people, including Shirley Temple, Cecil B. DeMille, Forrest Tucker, James Cagney, Robert Montgomery, James Murphy, Edgar Bergen, and many other notables in the film industry. Among those at the film's premiere was film critic Edwin Schallert of the Los Angeles Times who considered the film to be a magnificent achievement in film which would go down in cinematic history as a landmark film, noting the rapturous applause the film received by the audience during the various interludes. He stated that Fantasia was "caviar to the general, ambrosia and nectar for the intelligentsia" and considered the film to be "courageous beyond belief". Isabel Morse Jones, the newspaper's music critic, had high praise for the soundtrack to the film, describing it as a "dream of a symphony concert", and an "enormously varied concert of pictorial ideas, of abstract music by acknowledged composers, of performers Leopold Stokowski and orchestra players of Hollywood and Philadelphia, and, for the vast majority, new and wonderful sound effects". Bosley Crowther of The New York Times, also at the premiere, noted that "motion-picture history was made last night ... Fantasia dumps conventional formulas overboard and reveals the scope of films for imaginative excursion ... Fantasia ... is simply terrific." Peyton Boswell, an editor at Art Digest, called it "an aesthetic experience never to be forgotten".

Time magazine described the premiere as "stranger and more wonderful than any of Hollywood's" and the experience of Fantasound "as if the hearer were in the midst of the music. As the music sweeps to a climax, it froths over the proscenium arch, boils into the rear of the theatre, all but prances up and down the aisles." Dance Magazine devoted its lead story to the film, saying that "the most extraordinary thing about Fantasia is, to a dancer or balletomane, not the miraculous musical recording, the range of color, or the fountainous integrity of the Disney collaborators, but quite simply the perfection of its dancing". Variety also hailed Fantasia, calling it "a successful experiment to lift the relationship from the plane of popular, mass entertainment to the higher strata of appeal to lovers of classical music". The Chicago Tribune assigned three writers to cover the film's Chicago premiere: society columnist Harriet Pribble; film critic Mae Tinee; and music critic Edward Barry. Pribble left amazed at the "brilliantly-attired audience", while Tinee felt the film was "beautiful ... but it is also bewildering. It is stupendous. It is colossal. It is an overwhelmingly ambitious orgy of color, sound, and imagination." Barry was pleased with the "program of good music well performed ... and beautifully recorded" and felt "pleasantly distracted" from the music to what was shown on the screen. In a breakdown of reviews from both film and music critics, Disney author Paul Anderson found 33% to be "very positive", 22% both "positive" and "positive and negative", and 11% negative.

Those who adopted a more negative view at the time of the film's release came mostly from the classical music community. Many found fault with Stokowski's rearrangements and abridgements of the music. Igor Stravinsky, the only living composer whose music was featured in the film, expressed displeasure at how in Stokowski's arrangement of The Rite of Spring, "the order of the pieces had been shuffled, and the most difficult of them eliminated", and criticized the orchestra's performance, observing that the simplification of the score "did not save the musical performance, which was execrable". Other composers and music critics leveled criticism at the premise of the film itself, arguing that presenting classical music with visual images would rob the musical pieces of their integrity. Composer and music critic Virgil Thomson praised Fantasound which he thought offered "good transmission of music", but disliked the "musical taste" of Stokowski, with exception to The Sorcerer's Apprentice and The Rite of Spring. Olin Downes of The New York Times too hailed the quality of sound that Fantasound presented, but said, "much of Fantasia distracted from or directly injured the scores". Film critic Pauline Kael dismissed parts of Fantasia as "grotesquely kitschy". Some parents resisted paying the higher roadshow prices for their children, and several complained that the Night on Bald Mountain segment had frightened them. There were also a few negative reactions that were more political in nature, especially since the film's release happened at a time when Nazi Germany reigned supreme in Europe. One review of the film in this manner, written by Dorothy Thompson for The New York Herald Tribune on November 25, 1940, was especially harsh. Thompson claimed that she "left the theater in a condition bordering on nervous breakdown", because the film was a "remarkable nightmare". Thompson went on to compare the film to rampant Nazism, which she described as "the abuse of power" and "the perverted betrayal of the best instincts". Thompson also claimed that the film depicted nature as being "titanic" while man was only "a moving lichen on the stone of time". She concluded that the film was "cruel", "brutal and brutalizing", and a negative "caricature of the Decline of the West". In fact, Thompson claimed that she was so distraught by the film that she even walked out of it before she saw the two last segments, Night on Bald Mountain and Ave Maria, because she did not want to be subject to any more of the film's "brutalization".

==== Later reviews ====
On the review aggregator website Rotten Tomatoes, 95% of 61 critics' reviews are positive, with an average rating of 8.6/10. The website's consensus reads: "A landmark in animation (and a huge influence on the medium of music video), Disney's Fantasia is a relentlessly inventive blend of the classics with phantasmagorical images." Metacritic, which uses a weighted average, assigned the film a score of 96 out of 100, based on 18 critics, indicating "universal acclaim". TV Guide awarded the film four stars, calling it "the most ambitious animated feature ever to come out of the Disney studios", noting how the film "integrates famous works of classical music with wildly uneven but extraordinarily imaginative visuals that run the gamut from dancing hippos to the purely abstract". Roger Ebert of the Chicago Sun-Times rated the film four stars out of four, and noted that throughout Fantasia, "Disney pushes the edges of the envelope". However, Empire magazine only rated it 2 stars out of 5 (poor), concluding "this is a very patchy affair – while some of the animated pieces work, others come across as downright insane". Remarks have also been made about Fantasia not being a children's film. Religion writer Mark I. Pinsky considers Fantasia to be one of the more problematic of Disney's animated features in that it was intended as much as for adults as children and not what people had come to expect.

=== Awards and honors ===
Fantasia was ranked fifth at the 1940 National Board of Review Awards in the Top Ten Films category. Disney and Stokowski won a Special Award for the film at the 1940 New York Film Critics Circle Awards. Fantasia was the subject of two Academy Honorary Awards on February 26, 1942—one for Disney, William Garity, John N. A. Hawkins, and the RCA Manufacturing Company for their "outstanding contribution to the advancement of the use of sound in motion pictures through the production of Fantasia", and the other to Stokowski "and his associates for their unique achievement in the creation of a new form of visualized music in Walt Disney's production Fantasia, thereby widening the scope of the motion picture as entertainment and as an art form".

In 1990, Fantasia was selected for preservation in the United States National Film Registry by the Library of Congress as being "culturally, historically, or aesthetically significant". On the 100th anniversary of cinema in 1995, the Vatican included Fantasia in its list of 45 "great films" made under the Art category (the other categories being Religion and Values). Fantasia is featured in three lists that rank the greatest American films as determined by the American Film Institute. The film ranked number 58 in 100 Years... 100 Movies in 1998, before it was dropped from its ranking in the 10th Anniversary revision in 2007, though it was nominated for inclusion. The 10 Top 10 list formed in 2008 placed Fantasia fifth under Animation.

=== Controversies ===
In April 1939, Philadelphia advertising agent Mark S. Tutelman filed an injunction suit in an attempt to prevent the film being made. Tutelman claimed the film originated from an idea of synchronizing animation with classical music which he first described to Stokowski in 1937, had prepared scenarios and orchestral arrangements at Stokowski's request without acknowledgement or credit, and demanded a cut of the film's proceeds. In April 1940, Tutelman's case was dismissed. In 1942, Tutelman filed a $25,000 damage suit against Stokowski, charging the conductor of a misappropriation of ideas without credit. In April 1942, the Irish Film Censor insisted the film cut Taylor's scientific introduction to The Rite of Spring due to its "materialistic portrayal of the origins of life".

In the 1960s, four shots from The Pastoral Symphony were removed that depicted two characters in a racially stereotyped manner. A black centaurette called Sunflower was depicted polishing the hooves of a white centaurette, and a second named Otika appeared briefly during the procession scenes with Bacchus and his followers. The characters were initially removed for a 1963 re-run of the Disneyland episode Magic and Music, which originally aired uncut in 1958. Disney himself approved of the changes. The episode aired uncut on television once again in 1966, before the edits were incorporated into the film's 1969 theatrical reissue and has remained on all releases since. John Carnochan, the editor of the 1991 video release, said: "It's sort of appalling to me that these stereotypes were ever put in". Film critic Roger Ebert commented on the edit: "While the original film should, of course, be preserved for historical purposes, there is no need for the general release version to perpetrate racist stereotypes in a film designed primarily for children." Several fan restoration projects online re-insert the cut scenes back.

In May 1992, the Philadelphia Orchestra Association filed a lawsuit against The Walt Disney Company and Buena Vista Home Video. The orchestra maintained that as a co-creator of Fantasia, the group was entitled to half of the estimated $120 million in profits from video and laser disc sales. The orchestra dropped its case in 1994 when the two parties reached an undisclosed settlement out of court. British music publisher Boosey & Hawkes filed a further lawsuit in 1993, contending that Disney did not have the rights to distribute The Rite of Spring in the 1991 video releases because the permission granted to Disney by Stravinsky in 1940 was only in the context of a film to be shown in theaters. A federal district court backed Boosey & Hawkes's case in 1996, but the Second Circuit Court of Appeals reversed the ruling in 1998, stating that Disney's original "license for motion picture rights extends to video format distribution".

== Additional material ==
Disney had wanted Fantasia to be an ongoing project, with a new edition being released every few years. His plan was to replace one of the original segments with a new one as it was completed, so audiences would always see a new version of the film. From January to August 1941, story material was developed based on additional musical works, including Ride of the Valkyries by Richard Wagner, The Swan of Tuonela by Jean Sibelius, Invitation to the Dance by Carl Maria von Weber, the Polka and Fugue from Schwanda the Bagpiper by Jaromír Weinberger, a "baby ballet" set to Berceuse by Frédéric Chopin and a "bug ballet" set to Flight of the Bumblebee by Nikolai Rimsky-Korsakov, which was later adapted into the Bumble Boogie segment in Melody Time (1948). The film's disappointing initial box office performance and the USA's entry into World War II brought an end to these plans. Deems Taylor prepared introductions for The Firebird by Stravinsky, La Mer by Claude Debussy, Adventures in a Perambulator by John Alden Carpenter, Don Quixote by Richard Strauss, and Pictures at an Exhibition by Mussorgsky "to have them for the future in case we decided to make any one of them".

Another segment, Debussy's Clair de lune, was developed as part of the film's original program. After being completely animated, it was cut out of the final film to shorten its lengthy running time. The animation depicted two great blue herons flying through the Florida Everglades on a moonlit night, with more focus towards the segment's background art than story and animation. The sequence was later edited and re-scored for the Blue Bayou segment in Make Mine Music (1946). In 1992, a workprint of the original was discovered and Clair de Lune was restored, complete with the original soundtrack of Stokowski with the Philadelphia Orchestra. It was included as a bonus feature in The Fantasia Anthology DVD in 2000.

Destino, a collaboration between Walt Disney and surrealist artist Salvador Dalí, was also considered for inclusion as a future Fantasia segment, but was shelved until it was re-discovered during production of Fantasia 2000. In her host sequence for The Steadfast Tin Soldier in that film, Bette Midler mentions several cancelled sequences, specifically Ride of the Valkyries, Destino, Flight of the Bumblebee, Berceuse and the Polka and Fugue.

== Legacy ==
Fantasia will enter the American public domain on January 1, 2036, assuming the Disney corporation does not further alter United States government policy as with Mickey Mouse.

=== Sequel ===
Fantasia is timeless. It may run 10, 20 or 30 years. It may run after I'm gone. Fantasia is an idea in itself. I can never build another Fantasia. I can improve. I can elaborate. That's all.

— Walt Disney

In 1980, the Los Angeles Times reported that Wolfgang Reitherman and Mel Shaw had begun work on Musicana, "an ambitious concept mixing jazz, classical music, myths, modern art and more, following the old Fantasia format". Animation historian Charles Solomon wrote that development took place between 1982 and 1983, which combined "ethnic tales from around the world with the music of the various countries". Proposed segments for the film included a battle between an ice god and a sun goddess set to Finlandia by Sibelius, one set in the Andes to the songs of Yma Sumac, another featuring caricatures of Louis Armstrong and Ella Fitzgerald and an adaptation of The Emperor's Nightingale which would have featured Mickey as the nightingale's owner, similar to his role in The Sorcerer's Apprentice. The project was shelved in favor of Mickey's Christmas Carol, though the artwork made for The Emperor's Nightingale would later be used for a book adaptation by Teddy Slater in 1992.

Roy E. Disney, the nephew of Walt, co-produced Fantasia 2000 which entered production in 1990 and features seven new segments performed by the Chicago Symphony Orchestra with conductor James Levine. The Sorcerer's Apprentice is the only segment retained from the original film. Fantasia 2000 premiered at Carnegie Hall on December 17, 1999, as part of a five-city live concert tour, followed by a four-month engagement in IMAX cinemas and a wide release in regular theatres, in 2000.

Early development for a third film began in 2002, with Fantasia 2006 as a working title. The proposed segments included The Little Matchgirl by Roger Allers, One by One by Pixote Hunt, Lorenzo by Mike Gabriel, and Destino by Dominique Monféry. The project was shelved in 2004, with the proposed segments released as individual short films.

=== Live-action adaptations ===
- The Sorcerer's Apprentice segment was adapted by Jerry Bruckheimer into the feature-length film The Sorcerer's Apprentice (2010).
- The Nutcracker Suite segment serves as a partial inspiration for the feature-length film The Nutcracker and the Four Realms (2018), which itself contains several references to Fantasia.
- The Night on Bald Mountain segment was reported in 2015 as being in development by Disney Productions for a feature-length live-action film with a treatment written by Matt Sazama and Burk Sharpless. In 2021, it was reported that the project had been scrapped.

=== Parodies and references in other media ===
Fantasia is parodied in A Corny Concerto, a Warner Bros. cartoon from 1943 of the Merrie Melodies series directed by Bob Clampett. The short features Elmer Fudd in the role of Taylor, wearing his styled glasses, who introduces two segments set to pieces by Johann Strauss (Tales from the Vienna Woods and the Blue Danube Waltz, the former featuring Porky and Bugs and the latter featuring Daffy). In 1976, Italian animator Bruno Bozzetto produced Allegro Non Troppo, a feature-length parody of Fantasia.

The animated television series The Simpsons references Fantasia in a few episodes. Matt Groening, the creator of the series, expressed a wish to make a parody film named Simpstasia; it was never produced, partly because it would have been too difficult to write a feature-length script. In "Treehouse of Horror IV", director David Silverman had admired the animation in Night on Bald Mountain, and made the first appearance of Devil Flanders resemble Chernabog. The episode "Itchy & Scratchy Land" references The Sorcerer's Apprentice in a snippet titled "Scratchtasia", which features the music and several shots parodying it exactly.

In 2014, BBC Music created a music education scheme similar to Fantasia called Ten Pieces, intended to introduce children to classical music. Spanning two films (in 2014 and 2015), several pieces featured in the Fantasia films are also included.

The 2018 film Teen Titans Go! To the Movies references Fantasia during the musical sequence "My Superhero Movie".

=== Theme parks ===
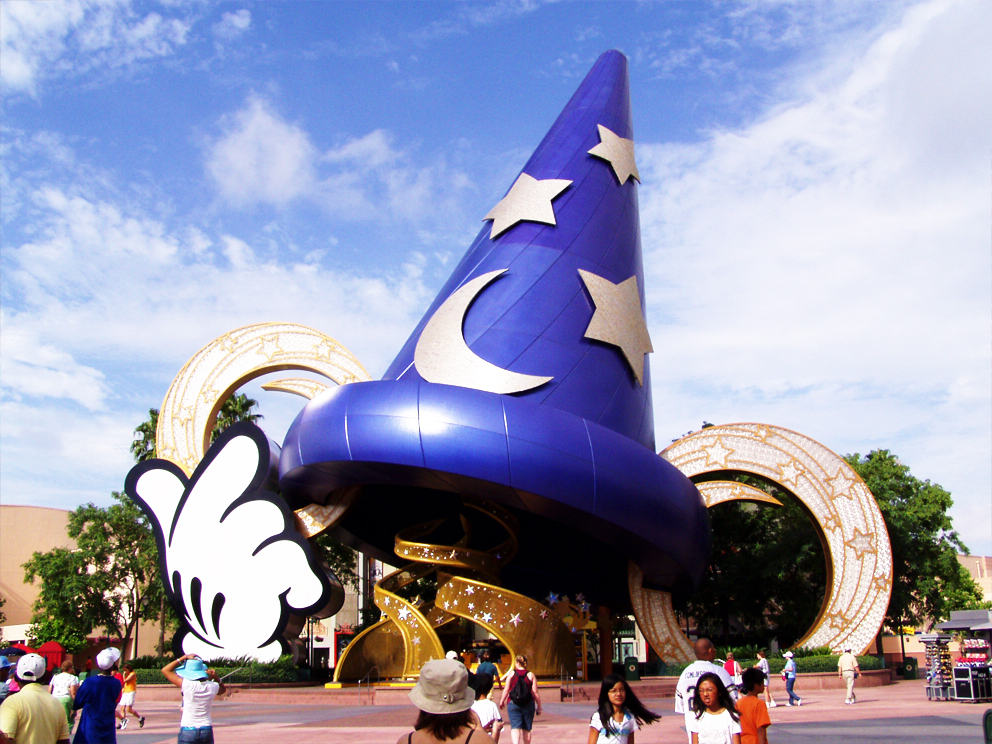
The Sorcerer's Hat in Disney's Hollywood Studios

From 2001 to 2015, the Sorcerer's Hat was the icon of Disney's Hollywood Studios, one of the four theme parks located at Walt Disney World Resort. The structure was of the magic hat from The Sorcerer's Apprentice. Also located at the resort is Fantasia Gardens, a miniature golf course that integrates characters and objects from the film in each hole. The fireworks and water show Fantasmic! features scenes from The Sorcerer's Apprentice and other Fantasia segments on water projection screens, and involves the plot of Mickey as the apprentice doing magic whilst also battling the Disney Villains.

For the 20th anniversary of Disneyland Paris, Mickey was depicted in a special version of his Sorcerer's Apprentice outfit with his friends wearing similar outfits. The "Night on Bald Mountain" segment is featured in the Storybook Land Canal Boats attraction at Disneyland Park in Paris along with the Fantasia Gelati ice cream shop in Fantasyland which is also inspired by the film.

Mickey's outfit, water buckets, and Yen Sid's spell book and chair are on display as props from The Sorcerer's Apprentice segment in the queue of the Mickey & Minnie's Runaway Railway attraction at Disneyland.

=== Video games ===
In 1983, Atari released a game called Sorcerer's Apprentice for the Atari 2600, based on that segment of Fantasia. The player, as Mickey Mouse, must collect falling stars and comets which will prevent the marching brooms from flooding Yen Sid's cavern.

In 1991, a side-scrolling Fantasia video game developed by Infogrames was released for the Sega Mega Drive/Genesis system. The player controls Mickey Mouse, who must find missing musical notes scattered across four elemental worlds based upon the film's segments.

There are several film reel levels based on some of the film's segments such as Sorcerer's Apprentice and Night on Bald Mountain that appear in the Epic Mickey games. Yen Sid and Chernabog also make cameo appearances in the games (Yen Sid narrates the openings and endings of the two games and served as the creator of the Wasteland. Chernabog appears as a painting in the first game and appears in the Night on Bald Mountain film reel levels in the second).

The Disney/Square Enix crossover game series Kingdom Hearts features Chernabog as a boss in the first installment. The Night on Bald Mountain piece is played during the fight. Yen Sid appears frequently in the series beginning with Kingdom Hearts II, voiced in English by Corey Burton. Symphony of Sorcery, a world based on the film, appears in Kingdom Hearts 3D: Dream Drop Distance. Like the Timeless River world in Kingdom Hearts II, it is featured as a period of Mickey Mouse's past.

Fantasia: Music Evolved, a music game, was developed by Harmonix in association with Disney Interactive for the Xbox 360 and Xbox One consoles. The game utilizes the Kinect device to put players in control of music in a manner similar to Harmonix' previous rhythm games, affecting the virtual environment and interactive objects within it. The game features licensed contemporary rock music such as Queen and Bruno Mars.

Mickey, in his Sorcerer's Apprentice guise, appears as a playable character in Disney Infinity.

Chernabog and Yen Sid appear as playable characters in the mobile game Disney Heroes: Battle Mode.

=== Concert ===
A live concert presentation of the film named Disney Fantasia: Live in Concert, showcases various segments from both Fantasia and Fantasia 2000. The concert version features a live symphony orchestra and piano soloist accompanying projected high definition video segments. The Fantasia concert was still touring throughout the world as late as 2022.

=== Television ===
Several elements from the film appear in television series Once Upon a Time. The hat from The Sorcerer's Apprentice appears in the fourth season episode "A Tale of Two Sisters". As the series progressed, the hat was shown to have the ability to absorb others, and those it absorbed would appear as a star on the hat. The Sorcerer's Apprentice himself makes an appearance, where he is an old man who guards the hat in the Enchanted Forest.

Chernabog from Night on Bald Mountain also makes an appearance in the episode "Darkness on the Edge of Town".

== Credits ==
Musical score conducted by Leopold Stokowski. Performed by the Philadelphia Orchestra, except as noted.

Segment	Personnel
Live-action introduction scenes	Master of Ceremonies and narrator: Deems Taylor; Cinematography: James Wong Howe
Toccata and Fugue in D Minor	Musical score: Toccata and Fugue in D minor, BWV 565 by Johann Sebastian Bach (transcribed for orchestra by Leopold Stokowski); Director: Samuel Armstrong; Story development: Lee Blair, Elmer Plummer & Phil Dike; Art director: Robert Cormack; Background painting: Joe Stahley, John Hench and Nino Carbe; Visual development: Oskar Fischinger; Animation: Cy Young, Art Palmer, Daniel MacManus, George Rowley, Edwin Aardal, Joshua Meador, and Cornett Wood, Russel Dyson, Jack Harbaugh, Mildred Rossi, Gifford Hiser & Dwight Stark
The Nutcracker Suite	Musical score: The Nutcracker Suite Op. 71a by Pyotr Ilyich Tchaikovsky (excerpts); Director: Samuel Armstrong; Story development: Sylvia Moberly-Holland, Norman Wright, Albert Heath, Bianca Majolie and Graham Heid; Character designs: John Walbridge, Elmer Plummer and Ethel Kulsar; Art direction: Robert Cormack, Al Zinnen, Curtiss D. Perkins, Arthur Byram and Bruce Bushman; Background painting: John Hench, Ethel Kulsar and Nino Carbe; Animation: Art Babbitt, Art Fitzpatrick, Brad Case, Cornett Wood, Les Clark, Don Lusk, Cy Young, Hawley Pratt, Frank Follmer, Jim Will, Vernon Witt, Tom Barnes, Ugo D'Orsi and Robert Stokes; Choreography: Jules Engel
The Sorcerer's Apprentice	Musical score: The Sorcerer's Apprentice by Paul Dukas (arranged by Leopold Stokowski); Performed by an ad-hoc makeshift orchestra of Los Angeles-based musicians, conducted by Stokowski; Featuring Mickey Mouse and Yen Sid; Director: James Algar; Story development: Perce Pearce & Carl Fallberg; Art direction: Tom Codrick, Charles Phillipi & Zack Schwartz; Background painting: Claude Coats, Stan Spohn, Albert Dempster & Eric Hansen; Animation supervisors: Fred Moore & Bill Tytla; Animation: Les Clark, Riley Thompson, Marvin Woodward, Preston Blair, Ed Love, Ugo D'Orsi, George Rowley & Cornett Wood; Outro featuring: Leopold Stokowski & Mickey Mouse (voice of Walt Disney)
Rite of Spring	Musical score: The Rite of Spring by Igor Stravinsky (abridged and arranged by Leopold Stokowski); Directors: Bill Roberts & Paul Satterfield; Story development and research: William Martin, Leo Thiele, Robert Sterner & John Fraser McLeish; Art direction: McLaren Stewart, Dick Kelsey & John Hubley; Background painting: Ed Starr, Brice Mack & Edward Levitt; Animation supervision: Wolfgang Reitherman & Joshua Meador; Animation: Philip Duncan, John McManus, Paul Busch, Art Palmer, Don Tobin, Edwin Aardal, Paul B. Kossoff, John Sibley, Stephen Bosustow, John Noel Tucker, Frank Follmer, Cornett Wood, Art Fitzpatrick, George DeBeeson, John Harbaugh, Jack Gayek, Jim Will & Jerome Brown; Special camera effects: Gail Papineau & Leonard Pickley
Intermission/Meet the Soundtrack (live-action sequence)	Narrator: Deems Taylor; Directors: Ben Sharpsteen & David Hand; Animation: Joshua Meador, Art Palmer, Harry Hamsell & George Rowley
The Pastoral Symphony	Musical score: Symphony No. 6 in F major, Op. 68 "Pastorale" by Ludwig van Beethoven (abridged); Directors: Hamilton Luske, Jim Handley & Ford Beebe; Story development: Otto Englander, Webb Smith, Erdman Penner, Joseph Sabo, Bill Peet & George Stallings; Character designs: James Bodrero, John P. Miller & Lorna S. Soderstrom; Art direction: Hugh Hennesy, Ken Anderson, J. Gordon Legg, Herbert Ryman, Yale Gracey, and Lance Nolley; Background painting: Claude Coats, Ray Huffine, W. Richard Anthony, Arthur Riley, Gerald Nevius & Roy Forkum; Animation supervision: Fred Moore, Ward Kimball, Eric Larson, Art Babbitt, Ollie Johnston & Don Towsley; Animation: Bernard Wolf, Jack Campbell, Jack Bradbury, James Moore, Milt Neil, Bill Justice, John Elliotte, Walt Kelly, Don Lusk, Lynn Karp, Murray McClellan, Robert W. Youngquist & Harry Hamsel
Dance of the Hours	Musical score: Dance of the Hours from the opera La Gioconda by Amilcare Ponchielli (extended and arranged by Leopold Stokowski); Directors: T. Hee & Norm Ferguson; Character designs: Martin Provensen, James Bodrero, Duke Russell & Earl Hurd; Art direction: Kendall O'Connor, Harold Doughty & Ernest Nordli; Background painting: Albert Dempster & Charles Conner; Animation supervision: Norm Ferguson; Animation: John Lounsbery, Howard Swift, Preston Blair, Hugh Fraser, Harvey Toombs, Norman Tate, Hicks Lokey, Art Elliott, Grant Simmons, Ray Patterson & Franklin Grundeen
Night on Bald Mountain and Ave Maria	Musical scores: Night on Bald Mountain by Modest Mussorgsky and Ave Maria, Op. 52 No. 6 by Franz Schubert (both works and transitional material arranged by Leopold Stokowski); Director: Wilfred Jackson; Story development: Campbell Grant, Arthur Heinemann & Phil Dike; Art direction: Kay Nielsen, Terrell Stapp, Charles Payzant & Thor Putnam; Background painting: Merle Cox, Ray Lockrem, Robert Storms & W. Richard Anthony; Special English lyrics for Ave Maria: Rachel Field; Choral director: Charles Henderson; Soprano solo: Julietta Novis; Animation supervision: Bill Tytla; Animation: John McManus, William N. Shull, Robert W. Carlson Jr., Lester Novros & Don Patterson; Special animation effects: Joshua Meador, Miles E. Pike, John F. Reed, Daniel MacManus, Sandy Strother & Don Tobin; Special camera effects: Gail Papineau & Leonard Pickley

== See also ==
- List of cult films
- List of films about witchcraft
- List of films featuring dinosaurs
