= Winter Summerland =

Miniature golf course in Florida

Winter Summerland Miniature Golf
- Interactive map of Winter Summerland Miniature Golf
- 28°21′13.03″N 81°34′30.83″W

Club information
- Location: Walt Disney World Resort; Bay Lake, Florida, U.S.
- Established: March 12, 1999
- Operator: Walt Disney World
- Website: Official website

The Summer Course
- Length: 18 holes

The Winter Course
- Length: 18 holes

Disney's Winter Summerland Miniature Golf is one of two miniature golf courses at Walt Disney World Resort in Florida along with Fantasia Gardens. It contains two 18 hole courses, one is winter themed and the other is summer themed. Around 450,000 rounds of golf are played in Walt Disney World's two miniature golf venues combined each year.

== Story ==
Late one Christmas Eve Santa Claus was flying back to the North Pole and he discovered snow over Florida. After surveying the situation he decided to make an off-duty vacation site for his off-duty elves, a Winter Summerland. Santa decided the only thing it was missing was a golf course. He split his elves into two camps, one that enjoyed the Florida sunlight and the other which enjoyed the snow and cold of the North Pole. The camps built two distinctly different 18 Hole Golf Courses, a sand course named "Summer" and a snow course named "Winter".

== Location ==
It is located near the entrance of Blizzard Beach. It is open from 10 am to 11 pm daily. A small selection of beverages (water, soda, juice & beer) & snacks (chips & candy), as well as golf-related merchandise are available for purchase. Small lockers are available and there is a refund when the key is returned.

- Opened March 1999
- Both the Winter and Summer sides have a record of 25 strokes
