= Fantasia: Music Evolved =

2014 video game

- Developer: Harmonix
- Publisher: Disney Interactive Studios
- Director: Maxi Boch
- Writer: Dean Wilkinson
- Composer: Inon Zur
- Series: Fantasia
- Platforms: Xbox 360; Xbox One
- Release: NA: October 21, 2014; AU: October 23, 2014; EU: October 24, 2014
- Genre: Rhythm
- Modes: Single-player, multiplayer

Fantasia: Music Evolved is a 2014 motion-controlled rhythm game developed by Harmonix and published by Disney Interactive Studios for the Xbox 360 and Xbox One with Kinect. The game is the interactive successor to Walt Disney Animation Studios' 1940 animated film Fantasia and its 1999 sequel Fantasia 2000, both of which it is based upon.

== Plot ==
At the start of the game, the guide, Percy, tells the player that they are embarking on a musical journey. When they finish their training as Apprentices and complete the first songs required to place the stars in the Sorcerer's hat, Yen Sid bestows the player the Sorcerer's Hat and the takes the player to meet the second supporting character, Scout, who needs help conducting music. After helping Scout to conduct music, she suggests to go back to Observatory, where Yen Sid resides, but he is absent and the player finds out that the force called the Noise had disrupted the realms. It is up to the player to restore the realms to their glory by completing goals of discovering remixes in songs in each realm, and participate in music making minigames in each realm.

== Gameplay ==
The narration directly references "The Sorcerer's Apprentice" segment from Walt Disney's 1940 animated film Fantasia. The sorcerer Yen Sid tasks his new apprentice, the player, with animating the worlds he has created. Players generate life in initially desolate levels by moving in rhythm with licensed popular and classical music, which unlocks gestures that change elements of the musical composition. In an example, a player traced arrows with her body in time with a song, and was rewarded with a selection of rock, orchestral, and brass music overlays that fit over the song. The Kinect shows the player as an on-screen silhouette, which transforms other objects when the two touch. The game is able to read nuance in the player's body movements and change the visual animations accordingly.

Fantasia: Music Evolved is designed to emphasize creative control, although with that in mind, players are able to score points based on how accurate they are in time with the music, and also build up a streak and a multiplier by switching tracks, and opening up composition spells for even more points. The player is unable to fail or lose the game, although they are able to complete goals. After completing a level, some musical elements are exported to the overworld. Players collect magical energy while playing, which is used to unlock items that can be brought into the levels, and can also unlock additional mixes mid-song by completing certain goals.

Players are able to share their final, saved mixes on the game's official YouTube channel after the levels are complete. There is also a two-player Co-op mode. Unlocked songs in story mode with their respective remixes, goals, composition spells, and realms become available in the song library, while party mode enables access to all available songs, although song-based goals cannot be completed.

== Development ==
Disney Interactive Studios first contacted Harmonix with the idea in 2010. The Harmonix team was invigorated from the success of its Dance Central and brainstormed about further intersections between motion control and music. Harmonix was not open to Disney's offer to meet at first since the team did not traditionally use third-party intellectual property. At the meeting, there was an instant connection when Disney mentioned Fantasia, since the brand connected with Harmonix's projects in development. Disney and Harmonix wanted a game more interactive for the player than simply participating in the actions of the film, so the Harmonix team began planning from Walt Disney's original intentions via his production notes instead of from the final film release. Disney Interactive Studios executive producer Chris Nicholls met with the Harmonix team to establish core principles upon which to base the game. The development team liked the "Sorcerer's Apprentice" dream sequence scene best, where Mickey controlled the weather and background orchestra like a conductor from atop a mountain. Its "reaching out" interaction is reflected in the gameplay. This scene, where "magic and the manipulation of music itself were woven into a single act", became a central narrative conceit and "creative inception point" for the team. While visiting the Disney creative teams, the Harmonix team was also inspired by Disneyland's World of Color show.

Fantasia: Music Evolved was unveiled at a press event just prior to Electronic Entertainment Expo 2013 as a modern update of Walt Disney's Fantasia. The game was designed as an interactive successor to the film. The team aimed to contemporize the film by connecting physical movement with music. They chose to emphasize freedom of choice instead of themes from their previous games such as imitation and scores based on performance. Harmonix co-founder and CEO Alex Rigopulos has called this evolution into "musical creativity" a long-term interest of the company, as well as its "creative responsibility". Project lead Daniel Sussman differentiated the game from previous Harmonix releases and added that the team was "trying to make something accessible and creative". The game is designed to read nuance in player gestures to afford for greater creativity. Harmonix also wanted the game to be a tool for making music similar to the experience of musicians. The team spent a long portion of its development period iterating through experiments before settling on the final combination of gameplay and creative elements.

Harmonix's CEO affirmed that the team was excited about the innovative aspects of the game, specifically its options for creativity. At the time of the game's announcement, creative director Matt Boch compared the creative spirit and innovation of the Fantasia film's team to that of the Harmonix staff. While internally testing the game, the team competed to perform the "craziest" performance of the songs. Disney and Harmonix have brainstormed about a theme park adaptation of the game as a future possibility.

The game was released for the Xbox 360 and Xbox One Kinect. Harmonix released plans for downloadable content (DLC), including additional music tracks and other game elements.

There is also another sorcerer named Scout, who acts as the game's guide, and helps the player fight off a force called the Noise, a force that brings distortion to the realms of the entire gameplay. Scout helps players learn how to remix music and restore music to each realm.

== Music ==
Songs from more than 30 artists are included in the game, and each song (except for one) is accompanied by 3 colour-coded mixes (Blue, Pink, and Green) with an optional fourth mix that is available as part of each expansion pack, 2 of the default on-disc mixes varies by the song, but can be customized before the song is played. "Bohemian Rhapsody", for example, has the original, an orchestral composition, a metal mix, and a remix by Fort Knox Five. In keeping with the films, the licensed music includes compositions from the classical era, including Night on Bald Mountain by Modest Mussorgsky that is a feature piece of the original Fantasia film. The span of music is a first for Harmonix, and represents a fusion of music genres across music history. Classical pieces are highlighted Italic and any other genre of songs are highlighted regular. There are thirty three songs in this game.

The original score for the game was written by Inon Zur, who also produced and orchestrated many other tracks in the game. The official soundtrack, consisting of Zur's original music along with all of the classical pieces featured in the game, was released on October 21, 2014. An extended director's cut, featuring exclusive tracks including remixes, was also made available the same day but released exclusively on Sumthing Else Music Works' website, later the Skill Tree Records website

Song title	Artist	Difficulty	Realm	Pink mix	Green mix	DLC mix
"Applause"	Lady Gaga	4/5	Tutorial/Bonus Songs (The Hollow)	HXV by Heroes X Villains	Veldt by Nelson Marquez	Arena by EJB (DLC)
"Blue Monday"	New Order	4/5	The Plant	Orchestral by Michael Veloso	Whalley's Strange by Chris Nicholls	HXV by Heroes X Villains (DLC)
"Bohemian Rhapsody"	Queen	1/5	The Nation	Classical Arrangement by Inon Zur	Metal by EJB	Fort Knox Five (DLC)
"Eine kleine Nachtmusik (Allegro)"	Wolfgang Amadeus Mozart	1/5	The Shoal	Nassau by Pete Maguire	Chords by Christopher Ansah (Chords)	
"Enjoy the Silence"	Depeche Mode	3/5	The Shadows	Speed of Dark by Symbion Project	Chris Micali	
"Feel Good Inc."	Gorillaz	3/5	The Plant	Melancholy Town	Case & Point	Danny Saber (DLC)
"Fire"	The Jimi Hendrix Experience	5/5	Bonus Songs (The Nation)	EK Electronica/Analog by Eddie Kramer	EK Orchestral by Eddie Kramer and Paul Taylor	
"Forget You"	CeeLo Green	2/5	The Neighborhood	'80s Rewind	WatchTheDuck	Fi-Ya House (DLC)
"The Four Seasons: Winter, 1st Movement"	Antonio Vivaldi	4/5	The Haven	Alt Rock	Steve Porter	
"Galang"	M.I.A.	2/5	The Neighborhood	Saffron Harem	Inter:sect Spoon Party	Daizy D00k H00TENANNY (DLC)
"Get Ur Freak On"	Missy Elliott	3/5	The Plant	Luke Boggia	Death Of The Cool	ASMS
"Hungarian Rhapsody No. 2"	Franz Liszt	2/5	The Press	Hungarian On The Plain	Telecaster	
"In Your Eyes"	Peter Gabriel	3/5	The Capsule	'79 Mixtape	Pardo Bros	Fort Knox Five
"Levels"	Avicii	3/5	The Cosmos	Inter:sect 6581	De7il's	0H S0METIMES
"Locked Out of Heaven"	Bruno Mars	3/5	The Cosmos	First Impossible	Ska	Fort Knox Five
"Main Theme"	Inon Zur	3/5	The Cliff	Closer To Inon by Dan Crislip	Four Way Stop by Chris Wilson and Dan Crislip	
"Message in a Bottle"	The Police	1/5	The Shoal	Sending Out A CQD	Audrio	Metal In A Bottle
"Night on Bald Mountain"	Modest Mussorgsky	2/5	The Hollow	Hamilton	Neon Sabbath	
"The Nutcracker Suite, Op 71a"	Pyotr Ilyich Tchaikovsky	3/5	The Shadows	D00 BAH D00	DC Breaks	
"Radioactive"	Imagine Dragons	2/5	Bonus Songs (The Press)	Spirit Kid	Jake Staley	
"The Real Me"	The Who	5/5	The Neighborhood	Orchestral	Big Vision Of Little St. James	James Landino
"Rocket Man (I Think It's Going to Be a Long, Long Time)"	Elton John	1/5	The Capsule	'80s and Rainy	Dubspot Labs	Interstellar Man
"Royals"	Lorde	3/5	The Cliff	Hifalutin	HXV	0I 0I 0I
"Scout's Song"	Inon Zur ft. Lindsey Stirling	3/5	The Cliff			
"Settle Down"	Kimbra	3/5	The Haven	Spartacus	Golden Ratio	
"Seven Nation Army"	The White Stripes	3/5	The Hollow	Micali X Bartlett	Steve Porter	Danny Saber
"Some Nights"	Fun.	2/5	The Haven	Ashtar Command Parallel	W@RBL3S	Mind Vortex
"Super Bass"	Nicki Minaj	3/5	The Cosmos	Soca	Jake Staley	She Always Fly
"Symphony No. 9: From the New World, 4th Movement"	Antonín Dvořák	3/5	The Nation	1-1	Remix For Big Band	
"Take Care"	Drake ft. Rihanna	2/5	The Shadows	Steve Porter	Pentatonix Vocal	Erik Jourgensen
"Toccata and Fugue in D minor, BWV 565"	Johann Sebastian Bach	3/5	Tutorial/Bonus Songs (The Capsule)	Organ	Synth	
"Yoshimi Battles the Pink Robots, Pt. 1"	The Flaming Lips	2/5	The Press	Mumbai	Grimecraft	
"Ziggy Stardust"	David Bowie	4/5	Bonus Songs (The Shoal)	Orchestral	Ashtar Command Parallel	

== Downloadable content ==
In addition to the on-disc setlist, there is also downloadable content which consists of 18 songs and three remix expansion packs. Three of the DLC songs are available as a pre-order bonus with retail copies of the game. The three remix packs are included with pre-orders of the either the standard digital copy or the digital deluxe copy of the game on Xbox One. The digital deluxe bundle on Xbox One included immediate access to all DLC for the game, which included all 18 songs and three remix packs. Those who purchase the standard digital bundle or the retail disc did not have early access to the DLC and would have to wait for each track to become available before purchasing. Purchasing all of the DLC individually would cost approximately $48 in total.

Song title	Artist	Realm	Pink mix	Green mix	Release date
"Paradise"	Coldplay	The Hollow	Erik Jourgensen	0NEPAIR	11/11/14
"Spoonman"	Soundgarden	The Press	Black Wave Paranoia	Danny Saber	11/11/14
"Try It Out (Neon Mix)"	Skrillex and Alvin Risk	The Plant			11/11/14
"Burn"	Ellie Goulding	The Nation	Tree Adams	Philharmonix	11/24/14
"Just Like Heaven"	The Cure	The Shoal	First Impossible	Fort Knox Five	11/24/14
"Lucky Strike"	Maroon 5	The Hollow	Dubspot Labs	Lindseystomp	11/24/14
"Burning Down the House"	Talking Heads	The Neighborhood	Nola '74	Boomtwins 'Nought But Ashes	12/9/14
"DONE."	The Band Perry	The Shoal	Tree Adams	Sonic ATS	12/9/14
"Stay the Night"	Zedd ft. Hayley Williams	The Capsule	Brain & Melissa	Death Of The Cool	12/9/14
"Counting Stars"	OneRepublic	The Cosmos	Tree Adams	Stars Hoe Down	10/21/14 (Pre Order) 12/23/14
"The Edge of Glory"	Lady Gaga	The Nation	Inter:sect	Kirv	12/23/14
"Let It Go"	Demi Lovato	The Haven	Cole Plante	L	10/21/14 (Pre Order) 12/23/14
"It's the End of the World as We Know It (And I Feel Fine)"	R.E.M.	The Neighborhood	XPUNK	MTM	1/6/15
"Lay Me Down"	Avicii	The Plant	L@y M3 D%wn	WatchTheDuck	10/21/14 (Pre Order) 1/6/15
"You Make Me"	Avicii	The Press	Bayreuth	Mystery Skulls	1/6/15
"As Long as You Love Me"	Justin Bieber ft. Big Sean	The Cosmos	Glitchtronic	Cole Plante	1/20/15
"Closer"	Ne-Yo	The Shadows	WatchTheDuck	Mall Goth	1/20/15
"I Cry"	Flo Rida	The Shadows	Dubspot Labs	Death Of The Cool	1/20/15

=== Remix Expansion Packs ===
The remix expansion packs are included with both digital versions of the game on Xbox One and Xbox 360. These expansion packs do not provide new songs, instead they provide additional remixes for the on-disc songs.

==== Dance Expansion Pack ====
- "Get Ur Freak On" - Missy Elliott
- "In Your Eyes" - Peter Gabriel
- "Rocket Man (I Think It's Going to Be a Long, Long Time)" - Elton John
- "Some Nights" - Fun
- "Take Care" - Drake (feat. Rihanna)
- "The Real Me" - The Who

==== Pop Expansion Pack ====
- "Blue Monday" - New Order
- "Bohemian Rhapsody" - Queen
- "Forget You" - Cee Lo Green
- "Levels" - Avicii
- "Seven Nation Army" - The White Stripes
- "Super Bass" - Nicki Minaj

==== Rock Expansion Pack ====
- "Applause" - Lady Gaga
- "Feel Good Inc." - Gorillaz
- "Galang" - M.I.A.
- "Locked Out of Heaven" - Bruno Mars
- "Message in a Bottle" - The Police
- "Royals" - Lorde

== Reception ==
Reception

Aggregate score
Aggregator	Score
Metacritic	77/100

Review scores
Publication	Score
Destructoid	8/10
Game Informer	8.25/10
GameRevolution	4.5/5
GameSpot	8/10
GamesRadar+	4/5
IGN	8.6/10
Joystiq	4/5
Polygon	7/10
Hardcore Gamer	4/5

Fantasia: Music Evolved received positive reviews. It received an aggregated score of 77/100 on Metacritic based on 48 reviews.

Kevin VanOrd of GameSpot described the game as "overflowing with charm" and that it "makes me feel like a graceful performance artist, a skillful sorcerer, and a master musician all at once".

Miranda Sanchez, writing for IGN, said the game "provides a surprising amount of control and personalization options over each song, which is paired with fun gameplay to bring a fresh new style to the music game genre".

Susan Arendt from Joystiq gave the game an 8/10, praising its animation, distinct personalities among different locales, and remixed songs which have extended the lifespan of each song, as well as the Kinect control. However, she criticized the composition spells, as she stated that the feature needlessly interrupts the core rhythm game.

Ashley Reed from GamesRadar gave the game an 8/10, praising the wide range of songs and remixes, but criticizing the forgettable levels, weak story, as well as persistent issues detecting certain movements.

Steve Hannley from Hardcore Gamer gave the game a 4/5, commending the visuals, remix quality and Kinect interaction.

Chris Carter from Destructoid praised the rewarding and solid gameplay, flexible, intuitive control, as well as an in-game mechanic which allow players to change up the theme dynamically.

Griffin McElroy from Polygon gave the game a 7/10, praising its core mechanics as well as the sense of ownership over music delivered, but criticizing the unnecessary unlock system, lack of difficulty setting and exhausting gameplay.
