= The Little Matchgirl (2006 film) =

2006 short film by Roger Allers

- Directed by: Roger Allers
- Screenplay by: Roger Allers; Kevin L. Harkey; Ed Gombert; Mark Walton; Ralph Zondag
- Based on: The Little Match Girl by Hans Christian Andersen
- Produced by: Don Hahn; Baker Bloodworth
- Edited by: Jessica Ambinder Rojas
- Production company: Walt Disney Feature Animation (Note: Additional production by Walt Disney Feature Animation Florida and Walt Disney Feature Animation Paris, France.)
- Distributed by: Buena Vista Pictures Distribution (Note: Distributed by Buena Vista Pictures Distribution through the Walt Disney Pictures banner.)
- Release date: July 7, 2006
- Running time: 7 minutes
- Country: United States

The Little Matchgirl is a 2006 animated short drama film produced by Walt Disney Feature Animation and released by Buena Vista Pictures Distribution. It was directed by Roger Allers. The film is based on the 1845 fairy tale of the same name by Hans Christian Andersen. It is the fifth Disney adaptation of an Andersen tale. It was nominated for the Academy Award for Best Animated Short but lost to The Danish Poet at the 79th Academy Awards.

== Plot ==
The film is set to the Nocturne from Borodin's String Quartet #2.

During Christmas in Saint Petersburg, Russia, in pre-Revolution times, an impoverished girl tries to sell matchsticks on the streets, but every potential customer refuses.

Later that night, the girl huddles in a snowy alley, trying to warm herself against the cold. Eventually, she decides to strike some of her remaining matches for warmth.

As the first match burns, she sees in its flames visions of warming her hands and her feet. However, when the match gutters out, she is returned to the cold reality of the alleyway. She strikes the next match to find herself enjoying a meal, and then the next, embracing her loving grandmother under a Christmas tree.

The next morning finds the girl still huddled in the alley, unmoving and covered in snow. Suddenly, her grandmother appears, and lifts her into an embrace. The music crescendos at this satisfying conclusion, until it is suddenly revealed that the grandmother is actually a spirit when they pass through the wall together. As they vanish and their spiritual light fades with them, the girl's dead body appears still in the snow with a smile on her face.

A comet soars across the sky, marking the girl's journey from the earthly realm.

== Differences from source material ==
The story's popularity far exceeded Andersen's original intention, which was to call immediate attention to the plight of Europe's suffering children. The differences between the Disney version and the original Andersen text are minor. The setting was moved from the author's native Denmark to Russia; Allers noted that the story was non-specific about location, and Saint Petersburg would allow for beautiful scenery and was associated with snow and harsh winters. The storytelling also leaves out the girl's cruel and overbearing father and the death of her grandmother, although the latter is implied at the end. Disney executives objected to the sad ending, so happier endings were tried, but ultimately rejected.

== Production ==
Allers and Hahn previously were involved in Disney animated films such as The Little Mermaid, Beauty and the Beast, Aladdin, and The Lion King. This short, which was originally intended for the scrapped Fantasia 2006 film (the sequel to the 1940 animated film Fantasia and its 1999 sequel Fantasia 2000), also officially represents Disney's final use of its CAPS system in animation, in the animated short film project, and also in the animated media production project.

=== Score ===
Because the film was intended for use in a Fantasia film, it was made in the Fantasia style, as a visual piece without sound or dialogue, set to a well-known piece of classical music. It was originally going to use Debussy's Claire de Lune, but later Allers decided to use the third movement (Nocturne) from String Quartet No. 2 in D Major by Alexander Borodin. This choice evoked images of Russia for him, which led to the decision to set the short film in Czarist Russia. Coincidentally, Borodin was a native of Saint Petersburg. According to the film's closing credits, the piece was played by the Emerson String Quartet.

== Release ==
The film made its debut at the Annecy International Animated Film Festival in France on June 5, 2006, and was released as an extra on The Little Mermaid Platinum Edition DVD (another work based on an Andersen tale). It was re-released on The Little Mermaid Diamond Edition Blu-ray on October 1, 2013.

The Little Matchgirl was released on the Walt Disney Animation Studios Short Films Collection Blu-ray on August 18, 2015.

== See also ==
- List of Christmas films
