= Roger Allers =

American animator and filmmaker (1949–2026)

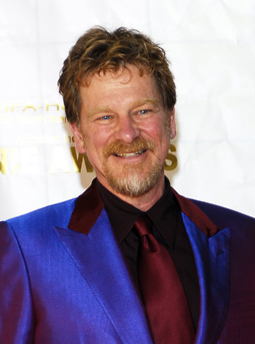
- Allers at the 34th Annie Awards in 2007
- Born: June 29, 1949; Rye, New York, U.S.
- Died: January 17, 2026 (aged 76); Santa Monica, California, U.S.
- Education: Arizona State University (BFA)
- Occupations: Film director; writer; animator; storyboard artist; playwright
- Years active: 1974–2023
- Known for: The Lion King; Open Season; The Prophet
- Spouse(s): Leslee Hackenson (m. 1977; div. 2020) Genaro Pereira (m. 2021)
- Children: 2

Roger Allers (June 29, 1949 – January 17, 2026) was an American filmmaker, animator, storyboard artist and playwright. He was best known for co-directing Disney Animation's The Lion King (1994), the highest-grossing traditionally animated film of all time, and for writing the Broadway adaptation of the same name. He also directed Sony Pictures Animation's first feature-length animated film, Open Season (2006) and the animated adaptation of The Prophet.

Allers was born in Rye, New York and was raised in Scottsdale, Arizona. He developed an interest in animation after he had watched Peter Pan (1953). Allers graduated from Arizona State University (ASU) with a fine arts degree. He lived in Greece for the next two years, and relocated to Boston where he attended animation courses at Harvard University. He next worked as an animator for Lisberger Studios on several projects, including Animalympics (1980) and Tron (1982). Allers also worked for Nelvana Studios in Canada and Toho in Japan.

In 1985, Allers was hired by Disney as a storyboard artist for Oliver & Company (1988). He later worked as a story artist for The Little Mermaid (1989), The Rescuers Down Under (1990), and Aladdin (1992). He also served as story supervisor on Beauty and the Beast (1991). Afterwards, Allers and Rob Minkoff directed The Lion King (1994), which became a critical and commercial success. For his second directorial project, Allers intended to direct Kingdom of the Sun, in which he was teamed with Mark Dindal. However, in 1998, Allers left the project due to creative differences. The project was reworked into The Emperor's New Groove (2000).

Meanwhile, Allers collaborated with Julie Taymor and Irene Mecchi on the Broadway musical adaptation of The Lion King (1997). Both he and Mecchi were nominated for a Tony Award for Best Book of a Musical. Later, Allers directed Open Season and The Little Matchgirl, both released in 2006. In 2014, he wrote and directed The Prophet. Allers died on January 17, 2026, at the age of 76.

== Early life ==
Roger Allers was born on June 29, 1949, in Rye, New York, to George Allers, who worked as an equestrian, and his mother, Shirley Williams, who ran the home. When he was six years old, his family relocated in Scottsdale, Arizona.

Allers became a fan of animation, at the age of five, after seeing Disney's Peter Pan (1953). From there, he decided he wanted to pursue a career in animation, and work alongside Walt Disney. A few years later, at age eight, Allers was sent off to Disneyland for a do-it-yourself animation kit. He recalled: "There was a part of Disneyland back then called the art corner, and they sold animation kits. There were books on the principles of animation and on how to draw the characters. You could even put together your own light table. And they gave you exposure sheets."

When Allers was a high school student, his father gave him a 8mm film camera, which he used to film special effects movies. He added: "I discovered the principle of double exposure, so my friends and I turned ourselves into ghosts. I also made stop-motion. But it wasn't very fancy. I just had to hit the button to get a frame!" However, Allers felt discouraged about achieving his dream of being an animator when he had heard of Disney's death in 1966.

== Career ==
=== 1974–1985: Animator ===
Despite not getting the chance to meet Walt Disney, Allers graduated with a Bachelor of Fine Arts (BFA) at Arizona State University (ASU) in 1971. For the next two years, he moved to Greece and during his time, Allers met Leslee Hackenson, his future wife, in Crete. For a time, they lived in a cave and sold paintings and crafts that they made to earn money for food and other supplies.

Allers moved back to the United States, and stayed in Boston when he audited animation courses at Harvard University. When one course was over, Allers created a 15-second animated short film. Allers used his short film with his portfolio and accepted a job with Lisberger Studios. In 1974, Allers was hired as an animator and worked for several projects, including Sesame Street, The Electric Company, Make a Wish, and various other commercials for the Boston Pops.

In 1978, he relocated to Los Angeles with Steven Lisberger to work on a feature film titled Animalympics (1980) to which he provided story work, character design and animation for the film. Three years later, Allers worked as a storyboard artist for Tron (1982). In 1980, Allers and his family moved to Toronto, Canada, where he worked for Nelvana Studios as an animator on a feature titled Rock & Rule (1983). During his two-year stay, he reflected: "I had a miserable time there! I just didn't get along with the upper management. I loved the talent. But I just didn't fit in."

Through his friend Bill Kroyer, Allers relocated to Tokyo to work on the Japanese-American co-produced animated feature, Little Nemo: Adventures in Slumberland (1989). Based on the comic strip Little Nemo by Winsor McCay, Ray Bradbury was adapting the script at the time. However, it was a tumultuous production; nevertheless, Allers provided character design, preliminary animation, and story development. He also served as an animation director overseeing the Japanese animators.

=== 1985–1991: Story artist ===
In 1985, Allers returned to Los Angeles; there, David Stephan, an animator, contacted him to explain that Disney was looking for a storyboard artist to work on Oliver & Company (1988). Interested, Allers applied for the position, although his animation portfolio was in transit from Tokyo. Allers was interviewed by Don Hahn and George Scribner, where he was asked to draw some sample character model sheets as a tryout and develop a new portfolio. He was hired shortly thereafter.

Allers worked on Oliver & Company for two years, and near the end of his involvement, he was the head of story. He recalled, "The tone of the story changed drastically while we worked on it. George Scribner's original idea was a lot rougher, a lot tougher. Fagin was kind of mean-spirited, and the dogs were really tough, and it was really a hard, hard film." He left Oliver & Company during mid-production after he had heard Howard Ashman and Alan Menken's demo recordings of the songs for The Little Mermaid (1989).

An adaptation of Hans Christian Andersen's fairy tale of the same title, Allers felt John Musker and Ron Clements's script for The Little Mermaid was well-structured with defined characters and themes. During production, Allers storyboarded the musical number "Poor Unfortunate Souls". He also mentored Brenda Chapman, then a CalArts graduate, and worked with her on several sequences. Allers later storyboarded scenes for The Prince and the Pauper (1990) and The Rescuers Down Under (1990).

For Beauty and the Beast (1991), Allers was less enthused to work on the project until he changed his mind when he heard Ashman and Menken's songs. Then-Disney CEO Michael Eisner insisted Beauty and the Beast would be the first Disney animated film to use a screenwriter. Jeffrey Katzenberg, the chairman for Walt Disney Studios, selected Linda Woolverton to write the script. Meanwhile, Allers was appointed as head of story, leading a team of story artists to illustrate sketches from Woolverton's screenplay. In her script, Woolverton had written a scene, in which Belle pushes pins into a map of the world, symbolizing the places she wanted to visit, while waiting for her father Maurice to return. Later, she attended a story meeting to learn her scene had been drastically revised to have Belle decorate a cake.

Infuriated, Woolverton protested to Peter Schneider, then-president of Walt Disney Feature Animation. Schneider suggested she and Allers worked together more closely in the same room. Throughout the storyboarding process, Woolverton arrived in Allers' office, which he shared with Brenda Chapman, to discuss the scenes that needed to be rewritten. From there, relations between Woolverton and the story team improved as she became more accustomed to the storyboarding process. When he reflected on the experience, Allers stated: "For the scriptwriter it must be frustrating to be reworking and reworking. I guess that's what's the storyboard process is. That's why we put our sketches up in little pins, because it all comes down, lots of times. You rework it, and rework it, and craft it."

=== 1991–1994: The Lion King ===
When Beauty and the Beast was nearly finished, Allers joined the King of the Jungle project as a director, alongside George Scribner. Allers attended brainstorming sessions with Scribner and Woolverton. However, Musker and Clements asked Allers to help storyboard sequences for Aladdin (1992). Allers worked on Aladdin for eight months and briefly worked on a version of Swan Lake. However, Schneider called Allers and told him he would return to the King of the Jungle project.

In October 1991, Allers rejoined King of the Jungle, in which he recruited Brenda Chapman, who would become the film's head of story. A month later, several of the lead crew members, including Allers, Scribner, Chapman, Lisa Keene, and production designer Chris Sanders took a safari trip to Hell's Gate National Park in Kenya, in order to study and gain an appreciation of the environment for the film. After six months of story development work, Scribner decided to leave the project, as he disagreed with the decision to turn the film into a musical, as Scribner's intention was to make a documentary-like film more focused on natural aspects. On April Fools' Day 1992, Rob Minkoff was added as a co-director.

Don Hahn joined the project as producer, but felt the early scripts lacked a clear theme. After they had established the theme of "leaving childhood and facing up to the realities of the world", they felt Woolverton's scripts needed more revisions. Allers and Minkoff formed a "brain trust" to solidify the narrative and emphasize the drama surrounding the theme of responsibility. The brain trust included themselves, Hahn, Sanders, Chapman, and Beauty and the Beast directors Kirk Wise and Gary Trousdale. The team held a brainstorming session for two days, in which they devised a new story outline. During those meetings, they outlined several aspects of the story, including Simba's psychological and emotional journey and decided to have Mufasa return as a ghost. Allers also changed the character Rafiki from a more serious court advisor into a wacky shaman. By the summer of 1992, screenwriters Irene Mecchi and Jonathan Roberts were hired to write the revised screenplay.

Retitled The Lion King (1994), Allers and Minkoff drew visual inspiration from classic American western paintings, such as those from Frederic Remington and Charles Marion Russell, and widescreen films from John Ford and David Lean. Throughout production, their directorial process began with several sequences divided between Allers and Minkoff. Each director brought their own vision to the sequences, but there was a constant exchange of viewpoints to better ensure a stylistic uniformity.

The Lion King premiered on June 15, 1994, and received critical praise for its animation and mature story. The Lion King became the highest-grossing film released in 1994 and was the highest-grossing animated film (at the time), in which it earned over $700 million worldwide. The film won two Academy Awards for Best Original Song (for "Can You Feel the Love Tonight") and Best Original Score.

Despite the praise, The Lion King was believed to have shared similarities with Osamu Tezuka's 1950 manga Jungle Emperor Leo, which became known in the United States as Kimba the White Lion. In July 1994, Minkoff told the Los Angeles Times: "I know for a fact that (Kimba) has never been discussed as long as I've been on the project." In 2015, Allers clarified he was made aware of the similarities as The Lion King was being completed. He further stated: "I could certainly understand Kimba's creators feeling angry if they felt we had stolen ideas from them. If I had been inspired by Kimba, I would certainly acknowledge my inspiration. All I can offer is my respect to those artists and say that their creation has its loyal admirers and its assured place in animation history."

=== 1994–1998: The Emperor's New Groove ===
Also, in 1994, Allers was called into Thomas Schumacher's office to discuss his next project. Inside his office, Schumacher explained that Disney Feature Animation was interested in exploring ancient, pre-Columbian native cultures for prospective film projects. Intrigued with the Inca culture, Allers and co-writer Matthew Jacobs conceived the idea of Kingdom of the Sun. Their story shared similarities with Mark Twain's 1882 novel The Prince and the Pauper and Anthony Hope's adventure novel The Prisoner of Zenda.

Meanwhile, Disney Theatrical Group, headed by Schumacher and Peter Schneider, had found success with the Broadway musical Beauty and the Beast (1994). Joe Roth, who had replaced Jeffrey Katzenberg as studio chairman, proposed another idea: "Why aren't you doing The Lion King? How can it miss?" Eisner agreed and pushed heavily for a Lion King stage musical, and Schneider and Schumacher eventually agreed. Schumacher hired Julie Taymor, whose work he had known at the Los Angeles Festival of the Arts, as the musical director.

"But ever since I was a child, I've loved musical theater and for me to be involved in a musical is a thrill. The Lion King is dear to my heart. That was a labor of love. Initially I was apprehensive to see what was going to happen to it, but then I became excited to see the film turn into another creation, to see the characters come alive in a new way."

— Roger Allers, 1997

Hired as the musical director, Taymor found the narrative structure of the 1994 film too limited, and sought to expand Simba's coming-of-age within the two-act stage format. For one month, she worked alone on several iterations of Simba's years in the jungle before Allers and Irene Mecchi, co-screenwriter of the 1994 film, were recruited to adapt the script for Broadway. The musical opened on November 13, 1997, at the New Amsterdam Theater. Allers and Mecchi were nominated for the Tony Award for Best Book of a Musical among eleven other nominations. The Lion King won six Tony Awards, including for Best Musical.

In 1997, Mark Dindal, who had directed Warner Bros.' Cats Don't Dance, joined Kingdom of the Sun as a co-director, alongside Allers. Both him and Dindal had known each other while working on The Little Mermaid (1989). During the summer of 1998, it became apparent that Kingdom of the Sun was not far along enough in production to be released in 2000 as planned. During test screenings, Dindal's sequences took a lighthearted, comedic approach opposite of Allers' more serious, straightforward vision.

In response to the creative differences, Schumacher and Schneider divided the production staff into two small teams under Allers and Dindal, and effectively had them run a "bake-off" to decide which version to go. While Allers changed some of the details of the original pitch, Dindal proposed a complete tonal shift into a comedy, which Schumacher and Schneider responded favorably to. Allers allowed Dindal's version of the film to go forward and stepped down as co-director. On September 23, 1998, Kingdom of the Sun was shelved, with reported production costs of nearly $30 million. The project was rechristened into The Emperor's New Groove (2000). Allers left to work on Lilo & Stitch (2002) as a story artist.

=== 1999–2006: The Little Matchgirl ===
In 2001, Allers was approached by Don Hahn to direct the short film, The Little Matchgirl (2006), which was adapted from Hans Christian Andersen's 1845 fairy tale. Allers reflected: "I was thrilled with the idea because it was a favorite story of mine. The idea of doing it as a musical piece and to do it justice was a thrill." According to co-producer Baker Bloodworth, the project was intended for a Fantasia sequel, which was envisioned as a "compilation of shorts that featured music and was to be representative of different sounds and cultures."

Since Andersen did not specify the original setting, Allers decided to set the film in pre-revolutionary Russia. He explained: "Also, in pre-revolutionary Russia, the extremes of the haves and the have-nots—the wealthy classes and the poor people—were quite pronounced. I thought that would also be a good setting to express that. That's why I chose Russia." The instrumental music used in the film was Alexander Borodin's 1881 piece String Quartet No. 2.

The Little Matchgirl went into production in 2002 and continued for the next four years as Allers was asked to return from outside, non-Disney projects to create several alternate, more upbeat endings. The Little Matchgirl premiered at the Annecy International Animation Film Festival in France on June 5, 2006. It was later included with The Little Mermaid Platinum Edition DVD. At the 79th Academy Awards, The Little Matchgirl was nominated for an Academy Award for Best Animated Short Film.

While he was working on The Little Matchgirl, Allers pitched the Celtic folk ballad tale Tam Lin to Michael Eisner, who at the time was in a corporate struggle with Roy E. Disney. Once Eisner recognized the project was Disney's "baby", he declined to green-light the project. Furthermore, Allers and Irene Mecchi were story consultants for the direct-to-video film The Lion King 1½ (2004). He explained, "Irene Mecchi and I would go to the story meetings at the Frank Wells Building, for the video division. We worked with them, made suggestions, came up with gags—that sort of thing."

=== 2003–2023: Post-Disney career ===
In May 2003, it was announced that Allers and Brenda Chapman would direct Tam Lin for Sony Pictures Animation. Allers stated, "My Celtic story, Tam Lin had ultimately been rejected. It was evidently too passionate. They were really looking for a comedy. The market was just driven by comedies at the time. Audiences were responding very well."

A year later, Allers was recruited as an additional director on Open Season (2006) alongside director Jill Culton and co-director Anthony Stacchi. The film featured the voice talents of Martin Lawrence and Ashton Kutcher. Based on an original pitch from Steve Moore, Open Season centers on the unlikely friendship between Boog, a domesticated grizzly bear, and Elliott, a one-antlered mule deer. After Open Season was released, Allers expressed he had grown "weary of big studio politics and was ready to develop something on my own outside of the context of a big studio."

In 2011, Allers wrote and directed an original performance piece for Heifer International to help alleviate world hunger. That same year, Salma Hayek sought to adapt Kahlil Gibran's The Prophet into an 2D animated film. Allers was contacted through a mutual friend about the project and reflected he had read Gibran's writings as a college student. He told Variety: "I had been profoundly affected by the book when I was in college, so when that offer popped up I was very excited to do it."

In January 2012, it was announced that Allers would oversee the narrative structure, as well as supervise the production of an animated adaptation of The Prophet. In May 2014, a work-in-progress version of The Prophet (2014) was screened at the Cannes Film Festival. The film later premiered at the Toronto International Film Festival on September 6, 2014. It was released in select theaters throughout the United States on August 7, 2015.

In 2023, Allers wrote the book and lyrics for an original stage musical called The Grasshopper based on the life of Jean de la Fontaine. A table reading of the musical premiered at the Pacific Resident Theatre in Venice, California on October 7.

== Personal life and death ==
Allers married Leslee Hackenson in 1977. In March 2020, Allers filed for divorce from Hackenson. They had a daughter, Leah, and a son, Aidan. In 2021, he married Genaro Pereira and they remained married until his death.

Allers died at his home in Santa Monica, California, on January 17, 2026, at the age of 76. He is interred at Woodlawn Memorial Cemetery. At the time of Allers' death, his daughter Leah was filming a documentary about her father's career.

== Filmography ==
Year	Title	Credits	Notes
1980	Animalympics	Character Design / Story Artist / Animator	Television film
1982	Tron	Storyboard Artist	
1983	Rock & Rule	Animator	
1988	Oliver & Company	Storyboard Artist	
1989	The Little Mermaid	Storyboard Artist	
1989	Little Nemo: Adventures in Slumberland	Animation, Animation Direction, Character Design, Production, Story Development	Uncredited, his daughter Leah was also the model for Princess Camille
1990	The Rescuers Down Under	Storyboard Artist	
1990	The Prince and the Pauper	Storyboard Artist	
1991	Beauty and the Beast	Head of Story	
1992	Aladdin	Story	
1994	The Lion King	Director (with Rob Minkoff)	
2000	The Emperor's New Groove	Story: Kingdom of the Sun (with Matthew Jacobs)	
2002	Lilo & Stitch	Additional Story Artist	
2002	The Sweatbox	Himself	Documentary
2002	Return to Never Land	Storyboard Artist	
2004	The Lion King 1½	Additional screenplay material	
2006	The Little Matchgirl	Director / Story Adaptation	
2006	Open Season	Director (with Jill Culton)	
2007	Surf's Up	Special Thanks	
2010	Waking Sleeping Beauty	Himself / Caricaturist Artist	Documentary
2014	The Prophet	Director / Screenplay	
2018	Howard	Himself	Documentary
2019	The Lion King	Special Thanks	

== Bibliography ==
- Finch, Christopher (1994). The Art of The Lion King. New York: Hyperion Books. ISBN 978-0-786-86028-9.
- Kroyer, Bill; Sito, Tom (2019). "Roger Allers Interview". In Diamond, Ron (ed.). On Animation: The Director's Perspective Volume 1. CRC Press. pp. 255–292. ISBN 978-1-138-06707-3.
- Taymor, Julie (1997). The Lion King: Pride Rock on Broadway. New York: Hyperion Books. ISBN 978-0-786-86342-6.
- Thomas, Bob (1991). Disney's Art of Animation: From Mickey Mouse to Beauty and the Beast. New York: Hyperion. ISBN 1-56282-899-1.
