= Fantasia Gardens =

Mini-golf course at Walt Disney World

Fantasia Gardens Miniature Golf
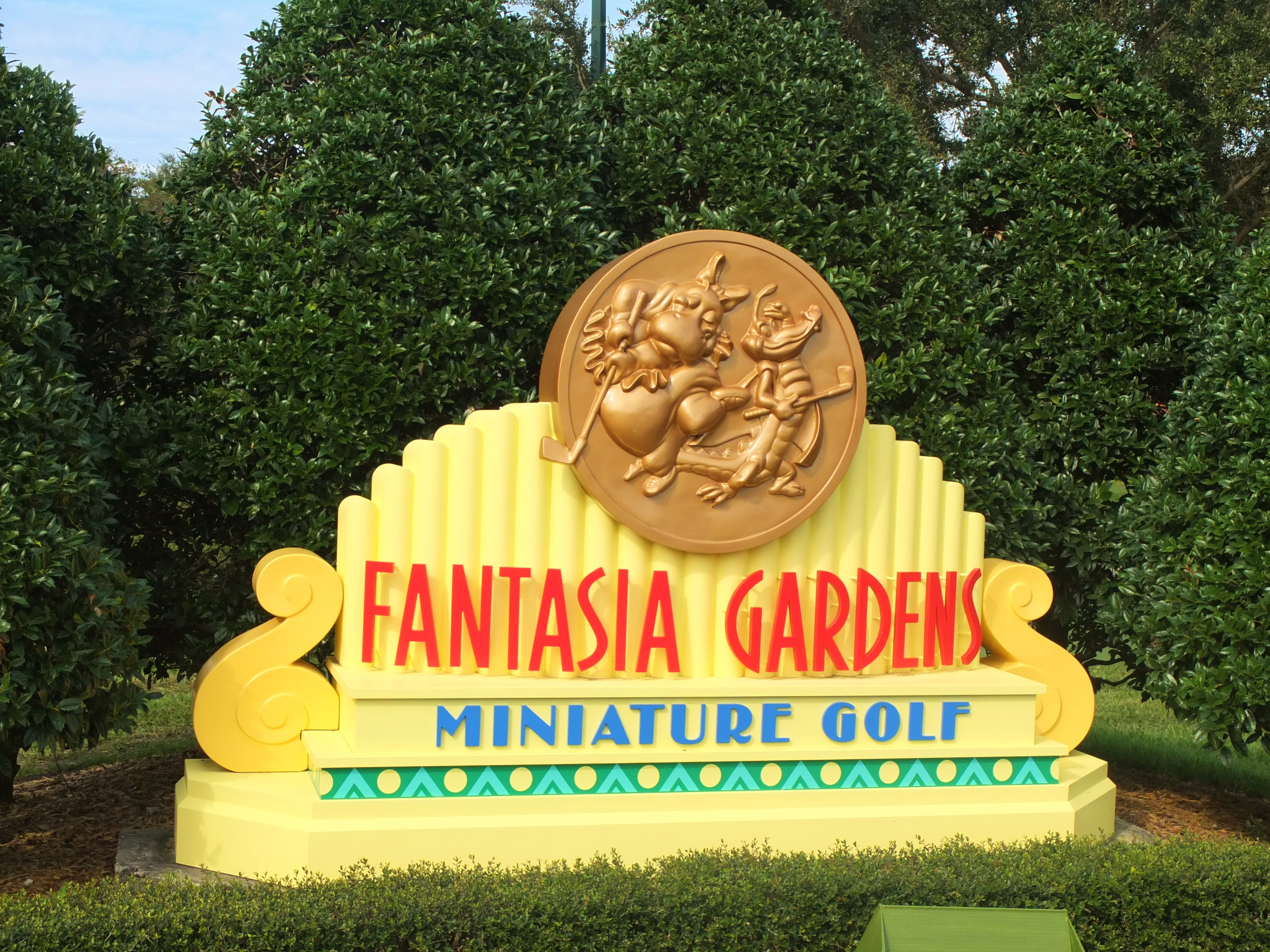
- Interactive map of Fantasia Gardens Miniature Golf
- 28°21′50.97″N 81°33′39.42″W

Club information
- Location: Walt Disney World Resort; Bay Lake, Florida, U.S.
- Established: May 20, 1996
- Operator: Walt Disney Parks and Resorts
- Website: Official website

Fantasia Gardens
- Length: 18 holes

Fantasia Fairways
- Length: 18 holes

The Fantasia Gardens Miniature Golf complex is a miniature golf course at Walt Disney World Resort in Bay Lake, Florida, United States. Located across from the Swan and Dolphin resorts, it has two 18-hole courses themed after the movie Fantasia and opened on May 20, 1996. Together with Walt Disney World's other miniature golf venue, Winter Summerland, around 450,000 rounds of golf are played each year. Golf Magazine ranked Fantasia Gardens as the best miniature golf course in Florida in 2024.

- Fantasia Gardens, the easier and more child-friendly of the two, features characters and objects from the movie integrated in each hole.
- Fantasia Fairways, the more difficult of the two, is designed with hazards of a real golf course such as sand traps and rough terrain, and has a par of 72 (the average for most courses is 54 or under).
- Confirmed by Walt Disney World, the record for the fairways course is 44 (28 under par) and was shot by a local golfer who plays the course daily.
- The course record was subsequently broken on 7/6/14 with a 45 (27 under par) and was shot by Lorcan Morris.
