= Joe Hale (producer) =

American animator (1925–2025)

- Born: June 4, 1925; Newland, Indiana, U.S.
- Died: January 29, 2025 (aged 99); Atascadero, California, U.S.
- Education: Lukits Academy of Fine Arts
- Occupations: Animator; film producer; layout artist; special effects artist
- Years active: 1951–1986
- Spouse: Beverly Hale
- Children: 1
- Military career
- Branch: United States Marine Corps
- Service years: 1942–1946 (active)
- Conflicts: World War II; Battle of Iwo Jima

Joseph Hale (June 4, 1925 – January 29, 2025) was an American animator and layout artist for Walt Disney Productions. He is best known for his only producing credit for The Black Cauldron (1985).

Born in Newland Village, Indiana, Hale aspired to work for Walt Disney Productions after repeated viewings of Bambi (1942). After serving in the United States Marine Corps (USMC), he studied at the Michigan Academy of Arts and Lukits Academy of Fine Arts. After graduating, in 1951, Hale was hired as an inbetweener for Walt Disney Productions. He soon worked as an assistant to Ollie Johnston, one of Disney's "Nine Old Men". Hale then worked in the layout department, where he mapped out the basic shot composition for animated films.

Hale remained with the Disney studios for the next two decades, and received an Academy Award nomination for Best Visual Effects for The Black Hole (1979). In 1980, Ron Miller appointed Hale as the producer for The Black Cauldron, in which he recruited new animators, including Andreas Deja, and was involved in the storyboarding and layout. In 1984, Miller was forced out as president and CEO, and was replaced by Michael Eisner and Frank G. Wells. Jeffrey Katzenberg was made the new studio chairman.

After a test screening for The Black Cauldron, Katzenberg wrestled control of the film, and clashed with Hale on the post-production re-editing. Released in 1985, The Black Cauldron received mixed reviews and failed at the box office. Within a year, Hale and his production team were fired from the studio. In 2008, Hale was given an honorary Disney Legend Award by the National Fantasy Fan Club (NFFC).

== Early life ==
Hale was born on June 4, 1925, in Newland Village, Indiana. He was one of nine children, which consisted of seven sisters and one brother. During the Great Depression, his family moved to Chelsea, Michigan. To support his family, he began working as a field hand, weeding onions. When he was 17 years old, Hale stated he watched Bambi (1942) seven times in three days during its initial release, an event he considered "almost being a religious experience." He decided there he wanted to work for Walt Disney Productions.

When the United States entered World War II, Hale dropped out of the eleventh grade to enlist in the United States Marine Corps, serving from 1942 to 1946. He once stated, "I fought in the battle of Iwo Jima. We were on our way to invade Japan when the War ended. So instead of invading, we went in as occupation troops. I spent several months in Japan before I was discharged."

Following his discharge, Hale returned to the United States and passed the GED test. He received a scholarship from the G.I. Bill, and studied for one semester at the Michigan Academy of Arts in Saginaw. However, his education was interrupted by a North American blizzard, also known as the "Great Blizzard of 1947." Fed up with the cold weather, Hale moved to California to study at the Lukits Academy of Fine Arts in Los Angeles. In 1951, he graduated and applied for a job at Walt Disney Productions.

== Career ==
=== 1951–1955: Animator ===
On April 2, 1951, Hale began working for Disney. He first worked in the traffic department, picking up and delivering mail to executives throughout the studio backlot. He did minor inbetweens for Alice in Wonderland (1951). He then became an assistant animator for Ollie Johnston on the 1953 film Peter Pan; they animated the character Mr. Smee. Describing their working process, Hale explained: "[Johnston] would do the rough animation. He would go through the scene and time it out and do all the key extremes and then I would fill in the other drawings." He continued animating under Johnston on Ben and Me (1953) for the character Benjamin Franklin, and Lady and the Tramp (1955), which he animated Jock, the Scottish Terrier. Soon after, Hale worked on the 1953 short film Toot, Whistle, Plunk and Boom and the "Man in Space" (1955) episode for the Disneyland television series, both of which were directed by Ward Kimball.

=== 1955–1980: Layout and special effects artist ===
Deciding not to continue working as an assistant animator, Hale approached Andy Engman about working in the layout department. He worked there, alongside Don Griffith and Eyvind Earle for Sleeping Beauty (1959). In an interview, Hale stated he did layouts for the forest scene where Aurora (as Briar Rose) dances with the animals and then Prince Philip, and interior scenes of the fairies' cottage. In 1980, Hale remembered: "...I got so sick of drawing that room, of drawing every different angle on it, over and over again." Hale did further animation layout on One Hundred and One Dalmatians (1961), Mary Poppins (1964), and The Fox and the Hound (1981). He did the same duties on numerous animated short films, including Scrooge McDuck and Money (1967) and It's Tough to be a Bird (1969).

By the mid-1950s, Hale began working on Disney-produced television programs, including the Disneyland anthology series. He worked under Wilfred Jackson, and then under Hamilton Luske for the Ludwig von Drake animated segments. He reunited with Ward Kimball on the television series The Mouse Factory (1972–1973). He stated, "I was doing some writing and layout on these. There wasn't much layout, so I did mostly story and set design." By the 1970s, he worked on Bedknobs and Broomsticks (1971) and Pete's Dragon (1977), in which he helped composite the animated characters and backgrounds with the live-action footage using the sodium vapor process.

Simultaneously, he did animation special effects work on several live-action films, including Return from Witch Mountain (1978), The Cat from Outer Space (1978), and The Watcher in the Woods (1980). For The Black Hole (1979), Hale served as the animation special effects supervisor, overseeing a team of artists who composited 300 effects shots containing cel animation, traveling mattes, and matte paintings. At the 52nd Academy Awards, Hale received a nomination for an Academy Award for Best Visual Effects, along with Peter Ellenshaw, Art Cruickshank, Eustace Lycett, Danny Lee, and Harrison Ellenshaw.

=== 1980–1986: Producer ===
Meanwhile, the long in-development The Black Cauldron (1985) had been languishing at the animation department for nearly a decade. Adapted from The Chronicles of Prydain book series by Lloyd Alexander, Walt Disney Productions acquired the film rights in 1973. Hale remembered, "Ron Miller called me up and asked me if I would take over as producer on The Black Cauldron. I think some of the animators did talk to him, or talk to someone, about me taking over the producing, but I didn't want to do it because a good friend of mine, Art Stevens, was the producer and I just didn't feel right about it." Miller replied regardless of his involvement or not, Stevens would be replaced. After a reconsideration, Hale took the position.

In 1980, Hale was made the producer, overseeing a production staff of 300 artists. Tim Burton, then a character animator, had drawn pages of character designs, but Hale felt they did not work in animation. Hale instead turned to Milt Kahl, one of Disney's Nine Old Men, who had retired to draw new character designs. Hale also reviewed a submitted portfolio by Andreas Deja, then a young artist from Germany. Impressed by his talent, he had Deja imported into the United States, and Deja was hired as an animator. Because of his experience in layout, Hale worked alongside Don Griffith and Mike Hodson, becoming heavily involved in the framing of each shot. He explained: "So, I wanted a lot of long shots. The way we approached layout in those days, like in the pictures that Walt was involved in, was we approached each scene as if they were a painting that you could frame and hang on a wall. We made each scene very attractive."

Shortly before the film's initial 1984 theatrical release, a preview screening of The Black Cauldron was held for test audiences. Appalled by the film's "cauldron-born" dark imagery, and questioning its appropriateness for children, Jeffrey Katzenberg demanded the scenes to be edited out. Hale objected, "Animated films can't be edited." Katzenberg overrode Hale's statements, in which he had the film print brought to an editing bay and removed the footage himself. Angered by Katzenberg's actions, Hale contacted Michael Eisner, who called Katzenberg in the editing room and convinced him to stop. Though he did what Eisner insisted, Katzenberg requested that the film be modified, and delayed its scheduled Christmas 1984 release to July 1985 so that the film could be reworked.

After the release of The Black Cauldron, Hale and his production team began developing a film adaptation of T. H. White's fantasy novel Mistress Masham's Repose. Hale selected Andreas Deja to draw preliminary artwork for it. While Roy E. Disney supported the project, Katzenberg disliked it and refused to greenlight it. Hale and two storyboard artists David Jonas and Al Wilson also worked on an early version of Beauty and the Beast (1991). Shortly after, Hale was laid off from Disney, along with the Black Cauldron animation team.

In 2008, Hale was given an honorary Disney Legend Award by the National Fantasy Fan Club (NFFC), recognizing his 35 years of service as an animator, layout man and producer.

== Personal life ==
In the mid-to-late 1960s, Hale married a woman named Beverly, and they had a son named Steven. Steven later had two children of his own, named Camille and Travis, giving Hale two grandchildren.

== Death ==
Hale died at his home in Atascadero, California, on January 29, 2025, at the age of 99.

At the 97th Academy Awards, his name was mentioned in the In Memoriam section.

== Filmography ==
| Year | Film | Position | Notes |
|---|---|---|---|
| 1951 | Alice in Wonderland | In-between artist | Uncredited |
| 1953 | Peter Pan | Assistant animator | Uncredited |
| 1953 | Ben and Me (Short) | Assistant animator | Uncredited |
| 1953 | Toot, Whistle, Plunk and Boom (Short) | Layout artist | Uncredited |
| 1955 | Lady and the Tramp | Assistant animator | Uncredited |
| 1955–1969 | Disneyland (TV series) | Layout artist Animator | 26 episodes |
| 1959 | Sleeping Beauty | Layout artist | |
| 1961 | One Hundred and One Dalmatians | Layout artist | |
| 1961 | The Litterbug (Short) | Layout artist | |
| 1963 | The Sword in the Stone | Layout artist | Uncredited |
| 1964 | Mary Poppins | Layout artist | Uncredited |
| 1967 | Scrooge McDuck and Money (Short) | Layout artist | |
| 1967 | The Jungle Book | Layout artist | Uncredited |
| 1968 | Understanding Stresses and Strains (Short) | Layout artist | |
| 1969 | It's Tough to Be a Bird (Short) | Layout artist | |
| 1970 | The Aristocats | Layout artist | Uncredited |
| 1971 | Bedknobs and Broomsticks | Layout artist | |
| 1972–1973 | The Mouse Factory (TV series) | Layout artist | |
| 1973 | Robin Hood | Layout artist | |
| 1974 | Winnie the Pooh and Tigger Too (Short) | Layout artist | |
| 1977 | The Many Adventures of Winnie the Pooh | Layout artist — "Winnie the Pooh and Tigger Too" | |
| 1977 | The Rescuers | Layout artist | |
| 1977 | Pete's Dragon | Layout artist | |
| 1978 | Return from Witch Mountain | Stop motion animation | |
| 1979 | The North Avenue Irregulars | Title designer | |
| 1979 | The Black Hole | Animation special effects | Nominated for an Academy Award for Best Visual Effects |
| 1980 | The Watcher in the Woods | Alien designer: "Other World" sequence Animation supervisor: "Other World" sequence | |
| 1981 | The Fox and the Hound | Layout artist | |
| 1983 | Backstage at Disney (TV special) | Himself | |
| 1985 | The Black Cauldron | Producer; Story | |
| 2009 | Waking Sleeping Beauty | Himself | Archive footage |

== Works cited ==
- Hulett, Steve (2014). Mouse In Transition: An Insider's Look at Disney Feature Animation. Theme Park Press. ISBN 978-1-941500-24-8.
- Ghez, Didier (2019). They Drew as They Pleased Vol 5: The Hidden Art of Disney's Early Renaissance. Chronicle Books LLC. ISBN 978-1-7972-0410-9.
- Ghez, Didier, ed. (2011). "Joe Hale". Walt's People: Volume 11 — Talking Disney with the Artists who Knew Him. Xlibris. pp. 514–561. ISBN 978-1-465-36840-9.
- Stewart, James B. (2005). DisneyWar. New York: Simon & Schuster. ISBN 0-684-80993-1.
