= Art Stevens =

American film director

- Born: Arthur Christopher Stevens; May 1, 1915; Roy, Montana, US
- Died: May 22, 2007 (aged 92); Studio City, California, US
- Occupation(s): Animator, Film director, Film producer, Screenwriter
- Years active: 1939–1983
- Known for: The Rescuers and The Fox and the Hound
- Spouse: Penny Stevens (1939–Death)

Arthur Christopher Stevens (May 1, 1915 – May 22, 2007) was an American animator, director and producer for Walt Disney Productions.

== Career ==
Art Stevens was an animator at Walt Disney Productions during the Golden Age of American Animation. Stevens began his career inbetweening on the 1940 film Fantasia. After doing in-between work on several films, he received his first screen credit in 1953 as a character animator on Peter Pan. During his career, Stevens contributed to the storyboards and animation in many Disney cartoon shorts and feature films including Ward Kimball's critically acclaimed 1950s television documentaries Man in Space, Man and the Moon and Mars and Beyond. Stevens was also an animator on the Oscar-winning shorts Toot, Whistle, Plunk and Boom (1953) and It's Tough to Be a Bird (1969).

In 1977, Stevens co-directed The Rescuers. He then co-produced and co-directed The Fox and the Hound (1981) and contributed story work during early production of The Black Cauldron (1985).

Stevens retired in 1983, after 43 years at the Disney animation studio.

== Personal life ==
Stevens was born in Roy, Montana. He was married to his wife, Penny, for 68 years, with whom he had two sons Craig and Kent. Stevens died of a heart attack in Studio City, California in 2007.

== Filmography as director ==
- The Rescuers (1977)
- The Fox and the Hound (1981)
