= Larry Clemmons =

American screenwriter

- Born: November 25, 1906; Chicago, Illinois, U.S.
- Died: July 22, 1988 (aged 81); Friday Harbor, Washington, U.S.
- Education: University of Michigan
- Occupations: Animator, screenwriter, voice actor
- Years active: 1930–1978
- Spouse: Carletta Clarinda Hatch
- Children: 2

Larry Clemmons (November 25, 1906 – July 22, 1988) was an American animator, screenwriter and voice actor who was a writer for Bing Crosby on his various radio programs and one of the original animators for The Walt Disney Company.

== Career ==
Clemmons graduated with a degree in architecture from University of Michigan but could not find work due to the effects of the Great Depression. So, desperate for work in any area he could find it, he accepted a job offer from Walt Disney in 1930 to work at his Hyperion Studios. After several years at Hyperion, he became an assistant animator for the Mickey Mouse film series.

When World War II happened, Larry left the studio and decamped to the Midwest, where he wrote technical manuals for wartime manufacturing plants.

Clemmons then freelanced in radio, and at the end of the war, landed a job on Bing Crosby’s prime-time network radio shows, where he spent nine years writing weekly scripts for Crosby and assorted guest stars. When the radio gig ended, he returned to Walt Disney Productions as a writer and segment producer on The Mickey Mouse Club. After finishing this assignment, he wrote Disney’s spoken intros for the television show entitled Walt Disney’s Wonderful World of Color. Clemmons retired in 1978 during production on The Fox and the Hound.

== Filmography ==
=== As writer ===
Year	Title	Notes	
1935	The Tortoise and the Hare	Film short Uncredited; Director: Wilfred Jackson	
1939	The Practical Pig	Film short Uncredited; Director: Dick Rickard	
1941	The Reluctant Dragon	Live-action scenes only	Animation Directors: Ub Iwerks, Hamilton Luske, Jack Kinney, Jack Cutting
1950	The Hank McCune Show	All episodes	
1952	A Case of Hypnosis	TV movie	
1956	Disneyland, U.S.A.	Documentary short	
1958-1961	Walt Disney Presents		
1959	Disneyland '59	Television documentary	
1961-1962	Walt Disney’s Wonderful World of Color		
1966	Winnie the Pooh and the Honey Tree	Film short	Director: Wolfgang Reitherman
1967	The Jungle Book	Director: Wolfgang Reitherman	
1968	Winnie the Pooh and the Blustery Day	Film short	Director: Wolfgang Reitherman
1970	The Aristocats	Director: Wolfgang Reitherman	
1973	Robin Hood	Director/Producer: Wolfgang Reitherman	
1974	Winnie the Pooh and Tigger Too	Film short	Director: John Lounsbery
1977	The Many Adventures of Winnie the Pooh	Directors: Wolfgang Reitherman, John Lounsbery	Disney's animated package film era narrated by Sebastian Cabot
1977	The Rescuers	Also the voice of Gramps (the turtle)	Directors: John Lounsbery, Wolfgang Reitherman, Art Stevens
1981	The Fox and the Hound	Directors: Ted Berman, Art Stevens, Richard Rich	

=== As animator ===
Year	Title	Notes
1934	Servants' Entrance	Uncredited
1935	The Tortoise and Hare	Film short
1939	The Hockey Champ	Uncredited
1939	Sea Scouts	Uncredited
1939	The Autograph Hound	
1940	Tugboat Mickey	Uncredited
1940	Billposters	Uncredited
1940	Mr. Duck Steps Out	Uncredited
1940	Put-Put Troubles	Uncredited
