= Hockey Homicide =

1945 film by Jack Kinney

- Directed by: Jack Kinney
- Story by: Bill Berg; Dick Kinney
- Produced by: Walt Disney
- Starring: Pinto Colvig (uncredited); Doodles Weaver (uncredited)
- Music by: Paul J. Smith
- Animation by: Jack Boyd; John Sibley; Hal King; Milt Kahl; Al Bertino (uncredited); Cliff Nordberg (uncredited); Les Clark (uncredited); Ward Kimball (uncredited); Andy Engman (uncredited)
- Layouts by: Don da Gradi
- Backgrounds by: Art Riley
- Color process: Technicolor
- Production company: Walt Disney Productions
- Distributed by: RKO Radio Pictures
- Release date: September 21, 1945 (USA)
- Running time: 7 min (one reel)
- Language: English

Hockey Homicide is a cartoon made by Walt Disney Productions in 1945, featuring Goofy.

== Plot ==
Narrator Doodles Weaver explains the rules of ice hockey in satirical format. The narration's emphasis on good sportsmanship is countered by the violence of the players (all of them "played" by Goofy). Team captains Ice Box Bertino and Fearless Ferguson are rivals who brutally fight each other and incur a penalty before the game can begin, sending both of them to the penalty box; subsequently, they are constantly released from the box only to be sent back to it as they cannot help but fight each other on the ice. Eventually, confusion over many extra hockey pucks after they whack the referee and make him drop all his pucks, leads the players and spectators to get into a massive brawl, during which snippets from other previous Disney cartoons (including Pinocchio, How to Play Football, How to Play Baseball, and Victory Through Air Power) are included to emphasize the mass confusion. Meanwhile, the Loose Leafs' and the Ant Eaters' team members have mingled together peacefully to rest and eat high in the stands, with the closing narration implying that they irritate each other's fans into fighting so the players themselves can watch instead.

== Production Notes ==
As was typical for the Goofy sports spoofs, most of the players' names are those of Disney staffers, including Jack Kinney, Al Bertino, Norman Ferguson, Art Riley, Bill Berg, Don DaGradi, Jack Hannah, Charles Nichols, Milt Kahl, Eric Larson, etc.

Pinto Colvig had left the studio by then, so archived voice tracks were used.

== Home media ==
The short was reissued by Buena Vista Distribution, and released on December 2, 2002, on Walt Disney Treasures: The Complete Goofy.
