= Roy High School =

Roy High School can refer to:

- Roy High School (Montana) in Roy, Montana
- Roy High School (New Mexico), in Roy, New Mexico
- Roy High School (Utah), in Roy, Utah

== See also ==
- Le Roy High School, in Le Roy, New York
