= Woodland Café =

- Directed by: Wilfred Jackson
- Story by: Bianca Majolie
- Produced by: Walt Disney
- Music by: Leigh Harline
- Animation by: Cy Young; Johnny Cannon; Izzy Klein; Bob Stokes; Dick Lundy; Paul Allen; Charles Byrne; Ward Kimball; Jack Hannah
- Color process: Technicolor
- Production company: Walt Disney Productions
- Distributed by: United Artists
- Release dates: March 13, 1937; 1948 (re-issued)
- Country: United States
- Language: English

Woodland Café is a Silly Symphonies animated Disney short film. It was filmed in Technicolor and released by United Artists in 1937 and was re-issued by RKO Radio Pictures in 1948. While it contained no on-screen credits, Wilfred Jackson was the director and Leigh Harline was the musical director.

== Plot ==
The setting is a nightclub staffed and frequented entirely by bugs. The cartoon is broken into three sections.

In the first, the patrons are shown arriving, putting their hats, gloves, and canes to the check-in counter, before getting to their tables and being served; the lighting is provided by fireflies; a jazz band is playing Euday L. Bowman's "Twelfth Street Rag" - with a brief instrumental battle with a tuba player and a trumpeter, a bassist shooing the leaf-eating bugs from chewing on his bass fiddle, a trombonist having an itchy backside as he improvises a way to continue playing, and a drummer playing his full set, two groups of dancers with the male species almost ready to tussle with each other, a group of trombonists and trumpeters alternately their part of the music before the whole band followed up; and a centipede waiter served out some cherry wine to the patrons from a singular whole cherry.

The second features a performance of a French Apache dance as a good-girl fly resists the advances of a bad-boy spider until he gets caught in his own web and tangled himself up. The fly plays the bad girl at the end of the dance.

Finally, everyone jams the dance floor, including the old bee and his red ant partner as they were smoking the floor, even the snails dancing the section a little slower, as the orchestra plays (and sings) Rube Bloom and Ted Koehler's "Truckin'" in the style of Cab Calloway on their instruments made of flowers.

== Production ==
Development for the film, which the working title was Bug Carabet, began in March 1936. Bianca Majolie, a classmate at Disney's high school, was the story director, and was hired in February 1935, making her the first woman to join the story department. Layouts were done on summer of 1936 by Terrell Stapp and John Walbridge. By this time, Disney's cartoons were increasingly sumptuous due to continuing production on Snow White.

One of the bugs eating the cricket's bass fiddle has red pants like Mickey Mouse.

In the edited version, part of the "Apache Dance" and "Everybody's Truckin'" were cut out due to racial stereotypes.

== Reception ==
Motion Picture Herald wrote on June 26, 1937: "Gay and tuneful is this richly imaginative visit to a bug night club. Equal to the brightly tinted tones in which the comic business has been dressed in the sparkling mood of animated fun and nonsense which the subject creates. Simply an enumeration of some of the hilarious and musical moments that occur in this odd rendezvous of frolic and frivolity, the incidents depicted will perhaps have a stronger appeal for the adult and the teen-age spectator."

== Voice cast ==
- Chorus voices: Clarrie Collins, Jimmie Cushman, Marie Dickerson, C.B. Johnson, James Miller, Thelma Porter, Eddie Printz, Duke Upshaw

== Home media ==
The short was released on December 4, 2001, on Walt Disney Treasures: Silly Symphonies - The Historic Musical Animated Classics. Prior to that, the featurette also appeared on the Walt Disney Cartoon Classics Limited Gold Edition: Silly Symphonies VHS in the 1980s.
