= Man and the Moon =

- Disneyland episode
- Episode no.: Season 2 Episode 14
- Directed by: Ward Kimball
- Original air date: December 28, 1955

"Man and the Moon" is an episode of Disneyland, which originally aired on December 28, 1955. It was directed by Disney animator Ward Kimball.

The show begins with a humorous look with a man's fascination with the Moon through animation. This segment features characteristics of the Moon depicted from William Shakespeare and children's nursery rhymes to lunar superstitions and scientific research. Then Kimball comes on with some information on the Moon, supplemented by graphics. Kimball then introduces Dr. Wernher von Braun, who discusses plans for a trip around the Moon. Dr. Wernher von Braun was employed as a technical consultant on this film by Walt Disney, and on a number of other Disney films. He had a great knowledge of rockets, as he had helped to develop the V-2 rocket while working for Nazi Germany.

Finally, a live action simulation from inside and outside the crewed ship Lunar Recon Ship RM-1 dramatizes what such an expedition might be like, including an almost-disastrous hit by a very small meteor. Towards the end, this film presents what seems to be a bit of "sci-fi"; as the RM-1, crossing the Moon's night side, approaches the night/day terminator, high radiation is suddenly detected, and a flare fired over the area reveals what looks like a rectangular double wall, or the ruins thereof, extending out from a crater; strangely, none of the crew remark on it, and the unusual radiation is never mentioned again. This episode later reaired in 1959 under a new title: "Tomorrow the Moon".

This episode was preceded by "Man in Space" and followed by "Mars and Beyond". It was repeated on June 13, 1956, and September 25, 1959.

== Home media ==
The episode was released on May 18, 2004, on Walt Disney Treasures: Tomorrow Land.

== See also ==
- "Man Will Conquer Space Soon!"
- "Our Friend the Atom"
