= Escalation (1968 American film) =

1968 American animated short film

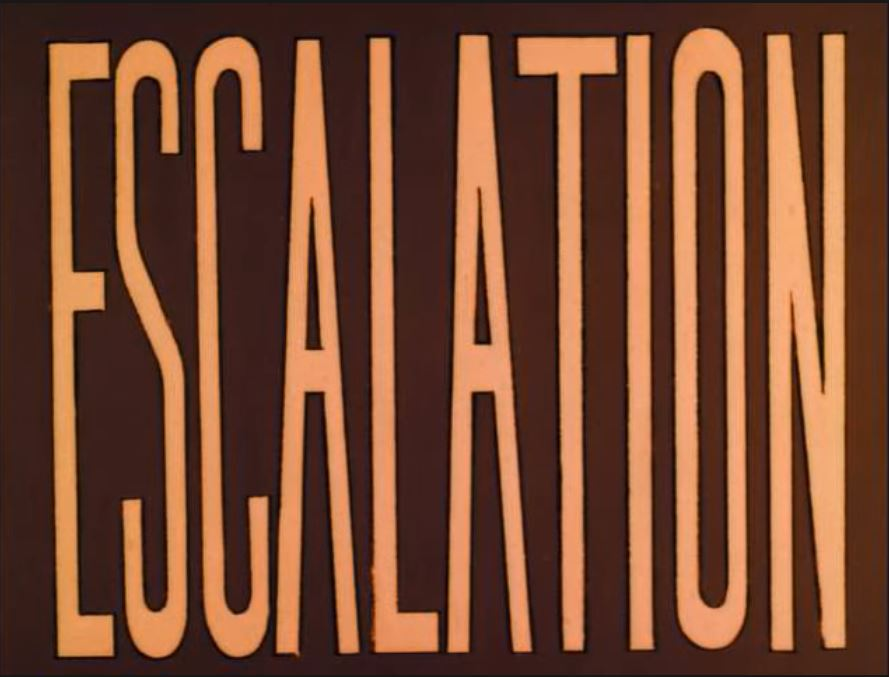
- Directed by: Ward Kimball
- Story by: Ward Kimball
- Starring: Paul Frees
- Release date: 1968
- Running time: 2 min
- Country: United States
- Language: English
- Budget: $3,000

Escalation is a 1968 animated short film, directed by animator Ward Kimball independently from his work with Disney. It is an anti-Vietnam War cartoon mocking U.S. President Lyndon B. Johnson.

== Plot ==
The animation begins with a countdown from 10 and a drumbeat, skipping over the number 7 and with each numeral getting larger in size as the countdown progresses. A dove of peace flies upside down and backwards, with X marks over its eyes as if it were dead. Then a giant statue of the head of Lyndon B. Johnson is slowly wheeled into view, while the melody of the "Battle Hymn of the Republic" plays. One of the statue's ears is shaped as a dollar sign. Actor Paul Frees imitates Johnson's voice reading the lyrics, later joined by a choir, with each instance of the word "truth" being bleeped out with a cuckoo sound. As the song goes on, Johnson's nose slowly starts to rise in phallic fashion. When fully erect, the nose begins to shake and then violently explodes as images of the Playboy Bunny, bare breasts, hot dogs, copious amounts of meat, Billy Graham, John Wayne, Doris Day, Coca-Cola, beer, Aunt Jemima, Lassie, Superman, Little Orphan Annie, S&H Green Stamps, cars, and cigarettes flash on the screen in rapid succession amidst images and sounds of explosions, followed by a similarly rapid succession of military decoration, ending on the Purple Heart (the medal for those wounded or killed in combat) as a single clock chime is heard. The cartoon fades out by having the statue crack into pieces.

The gradual enlargement of Johnson's nose is reminiscent of Pinocchio, whose nose grew longer whenever he lied. Kimball worked on the 1940 Disney adaptation of Pinocchio.

== Production ==
Kimball made Escalation independent of the Disney Studios and it is notable for being the only animated cartoon made in this manner by one of Disney's core animators - "Disney's Nine Old Men". Escalation originated from the anger of the "Battle Hymn" during the Vietnam War (a song Kimball performed many times with Firehouse Five Plus Two), and a story from The Realist suggesting Johnson was preoccupied with the size of his genitals. Kimball had a budget of 3,000 dollars and outsourced the ink and painting to Celine Miles Ink & Paint, had a college choir sing the "Battle Hymn of the Republic", paid an outside camera man to shoot the frames, and finished the film with the help of a friend.

Kimball showed the film at film festivals, college campuses during the U.S. presidential election year in 1968, and gave away copies to whomever was interested. Los Angeles art house "The Cinema Theatre" screened it three times. The film was submitted for the Academy Award but was rejected due to its content.

In a 2000 interview shortly before his death, Kimball said Escalation had not received the mainstream attention it deserved. In 2007, relatives of Kimball put the film online on YouTube.

== See also ==
- Mickey Mouse in Vietnam
- Bring Me the Head of Charlie Brown
- Bambi Meets Godzilla
- List of anti-war films

== Sources ==
- Pierce, Todd (2019). The Life and Times of Ward Kimball: Maverick of Disney Animation. University Press of Mississippi. ISBN 9781496820990.
