= Bianca Majolie =

Italian-born American artist (1900–1997)

- Born: 13 September 1900; Rome, Italy
- Died: 6 September 1997 (aged 96); Los Angeles, California
- Other names: Blanche Majolie; Bianca Maggioli; Bianca Majolie-Heilborn
- Education: Art Institute of Chicago; Art Students League of New York
- Occupations: storyboard artist, concept artist, art director, author, illustrator
- Years active: 1929–1997
- Spouse: Carl Heilborn (1942–1954; his death)

Bianca Majolie (born Bianca Maggioli, 13 September 1900 – 6 September 1997) was an Italian-born American story artist, concept artist, and writer. In 1935, she was the first woman to become a storyboard artist for Walt Disney Productions.

== Life and career ==
Born in Rome, Italy, Majolie was born Bianca Maggioli. She attended art classes in School of the Art Institute of Chicago and McKinley High School. While studying at McKinley, her French teacher, Josephine Mack, changed her name to Blanche Majolie. Meanwhile, Walt Disney was in his freshman year at McKinley, but dropped out to volunteer in the Red Cross in 1918. Majolie claimed she "did not know him or his friends personally, and saw him only once on the day after he came back to school dressed in his G.I. uniform to say good-bye [at the end of World War I]. I was graduating mid-term, handed him my girl grad-book, and he drew pictures in it."

After graduating, Majolie studied figure painting and design at the Grand Central School of Art, clay sculpturing at Art Students League, and "drawing for line continuity" at Leonardo da Vinci Art School in New York. In 1929, she worked as a freelance artist on fashion assignments for Earnshaw Publications, and served for five years at J.C. Penney as an art director and brochure designer until 1934. At the same time, she submitted a comic strip about a girl named Stella who was trying to find a job during the Great Depression for a contest held by King Features Syndicate.

In 1934, Majolie submitted a letter to Disney expressing interest in working for his animation department. The two held lunch at the Tam O'Shanter Inn where, based on the strength of her samples of "Stella", he hired her to serve in the story department. In 1935, the story department was predominantly male with at least fifteen men where story conferences were mostly held for slapstick-driven ideas. That same year, Majolie submitted a thirteen-page outline entitled "The Romance of Baby Elephant", which went into production as the Silly Symphony cartoon, Elmer Elephant (1935). Her affectionate story would later be praised by animators Frank Thomas and Ollie Johnston, in which they wrote of her contributions: "We could not have made any of the feature films without learning this important lesson: Pathos gives comedy the heart and warmth that keeps it from becoming brittle."

In 1937, she was commissioned by Disney to provide a new English translation of the Carlo Collodi novel, The Adventures of Pinocchio, for his animated film adaptation. In 1938, she wrote several story outlines and provided visual development artwork for early versions of Cinderella (1950) and Peter Pan (1953). That same year, she partnered with artist Al Heath to provide conceptual artwork on the Nutcracker Suite segment in Fantasia (1940). Following her work on The Ugly Duckling (1939), Majolie took a sabbatical leave from Disney claiming she had "lost interest". In June 1940, she returned to the studio where she was informed of her firing.

After her career at Disney, Majolie married American artist Carl Heilborn in 1942. She later worked on private commissions for glass panels and ceramic art sculptures, and briefly returned to Chicago to illustrate her book The Children's Treasury. In 1953, they opened the Heilborn Studio Gallery in Los Angeles where they featured their work and that of other artists. Heilborn later died of a heart attack on April 26, 1954. She died on September 6, 1997.

== Bibliography ==
- Canemaker, John (1996). Before the Animation Begins: The Art and Lives of Disney Inspirational Sketch Artists. Hyperion Books. pp. 97–105. ISBN 978-0-786-86152-1.
- Ghez, Didier (2015). They Drew as They Pleased: The Hidden Art of Disney's Golden Age: the 1930s. Chronicle Books. pp. 174–183. ISBN 978-1-452-13743-8.
