= Toby Tortoise Returns =

1936 animated Technicolor cartoon

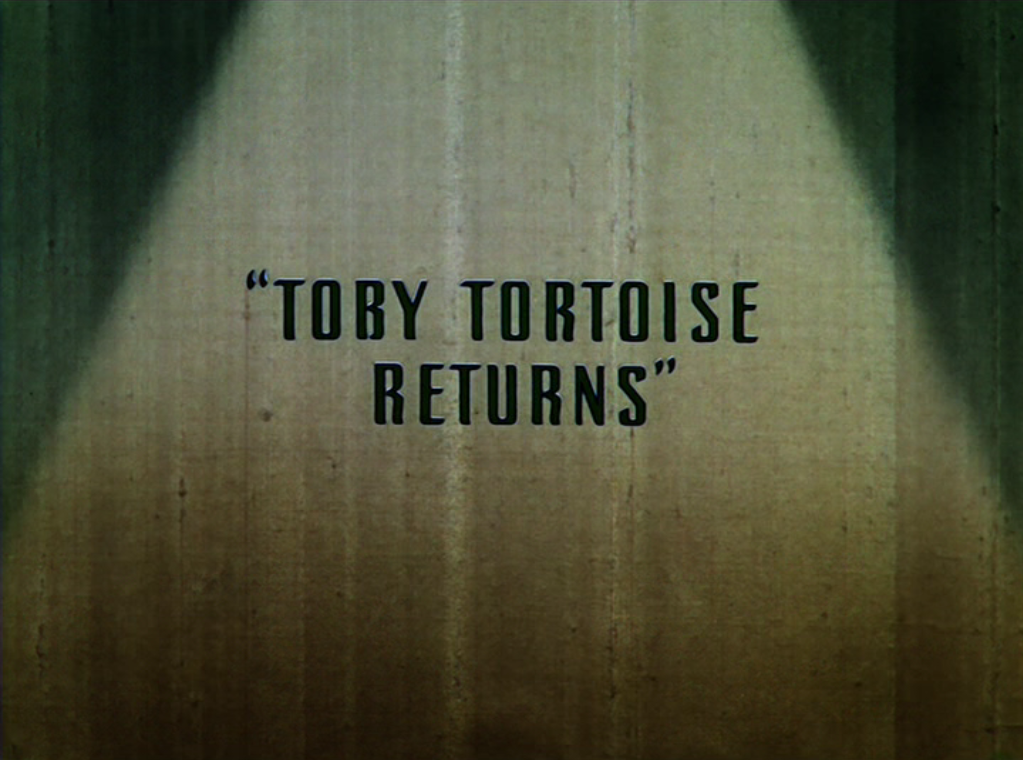
- Directed by: Wilfred Jackson
- Story by: William Cottrell; Joe Grant; Ward Kimball; Bob Kuwahara
- Produced by: Walt Disney
- Starring: Eddie Holden; Ned Norton; Martha Wentworth; Adriana Caselotti; Leone Ledoux; Marcellite Garner
- Music by: Frank Churchill; Leigh Harline
- Animation by: Ward Kimball; Dick Lundy; Robert Stokes; Dick Huemer; Rollin Hamilton; Milt Kahl; Isadore Klein; Marvin Woodward
- Color process: Technicolor
- Production company: Walt Disney Productions
- Distributed by: United Artists
- Release date: August 22, 1936
- Running time: 7 minutes
- Language: English

Toby Tortoise Returns is an animated Technicolor short film in Walt Disney's Silly Symphonies series, directed by Wilfred Jackson. It is a sequel to the 1935 short The Tortoise and the Hare, and premiered on August 22, 1936.

This time the plot revolves around a boxing match. The short features characters from other Silly Symphonies, including Elmer Elephant and Tillie Tiger from Elmer Elephant, Fifer Pig, Fiddler Pig, Practical Pig and the Big Bad Wolf from Three Little Pigs, and Jenny Wren and the cuckoo from Who Killed Cock Robin?. It was released in VHS, LaserDisc, and DVD formats in various countries.

== Plot ==
Max Hare is boxing Toby Tortoise and beating him severely in round one. Between each round, Jenny Wren from "Who Killed Cock Robin?" tells Toby that she likes a man who takes his time, which seems to reinvigorate him. In round two, Max declares what the final blow should be, but Toby pulls into his shell to avoid Max's fists. Feeling robbed, Max demands that Toby should come out and face him, but Toby says that he feels safer inside his shell. Max tries to make Toby come out by dumping a bucket of water into his shell, but then Toby pops out wearing a diving helmet and squirts water in Max's face. At the end of his patience, Max fills Toby's shell with fireworks to draw him out. However, this backfires Toby as he unintentionally begins shooting fireworks in Max's direction. One firework sends Max flying out of the arena with the paramedics who are waiting to take Toby to the hospital. When the fireworks stop, Toby is declared the winner.

== Voice cast ==
- Ned Norton as Max Hare
- Eddie Holden as Toby Tortoise
- Martha Wentworth as Jenny Wren
- Adriana Caselotti as Bunny girl
- Leone Ledoux as Bunny girl
- Marcellite Garner as Bunny girl

== Home media ==
The short was released on December 4, 2001, on Walt Disney Treasures: Silly Symphonies - The Historic Musical Animated Classics.
