= Milt Kahl =

American animator (1909–1987)

- Born: Milton Erwin Kahl; March 22, 1909; San Francisco, California, U.S.
- Died: April 19, 1987 (aged 78); Mill Valley, California, U.S.
- Occupation: Animator
- Years active: 1936–1976, 1985–1986
- Known for: One of Disney's Nine Old Men
- Spouses: Laura Nordquist Kahl (m. 1934; died 1967) Phyllis Bounds Detiege (m. 1968; div. 1978) Julie Kahl (m. 1980)
- Children: 2

Milton Erwin Kahl (March 22, 1909 – April 19, 1987) was an American animator. He was one of (and often considered the most influential of) Walt Disney's supervisory team of animators, known as Disney's Nine Old Men, recognised for his significant influence on character animation. He was officially inducted as a Disney Legend in 1989.

== Biography ==
Kahl was born in San Francisco, California, to Erwin, a saloon bartender, and Grace Kahl. He had three younger sisters, Dorothy, Marion, and Gladys. He would often refine character sketches from Bill Peet, incorporating ideas of Ken Anderson. The final look of many characters in the Disney films was designed by Kahl, in his angular style inspired by Ronald Searle and Picasso. He is revered by contemporary masters of the form such as Andreas Deja, and also Brad Bird, who was his protégé at Disney in the early 1970s. In the behind-the-scenes feature "Fine Food and Film" shown on the Ratatouille DVD, Bird referred to Kahl as "tough," but in a gentle way, as he often gave Bird advice on where he could improve in animation whenever he came up short. Bird later repeated this in "The Giant's Dream" documentary on the Blu Ray for The Iron Giant.

In the book The Animator's Survival Kit, the author Richard Williams makes repeated references and anecdotes relating to Kahl, whom he befriended during his early years in the animation industry. The centenary of Kahl's birth was honored by the Academy on April 27, 2009, with a tribute entitled "Milt Kahl: The Animation Michelangelo" and featured Brad Bird as a panelist.

On April 19, 1987, Kahl died of pneumonia, aged 78, in Mill Valley, California.

== Filmography ==
Year	Title	Credits	Characters	Notes
1934	Servants' Entrance	Animator		uncredited
1935	Mickey's Fire Brigade (Short)	Animator		uncredited
1935	On Ice (short)	Animator		uncredited
1936	Orphans' Picnic (Short)	Animator		uncredited
1936	Elmer Elephant (short)	Animator		uncredited
1936	Mickey's Circus (short)	Animator		uncredited
1936	Toby Tortoise Returns (short)	Animator		uncredited
1937	Snow White and the Seven Dwarfs	Animator	Forest animals	Credited as Milton Kahl
1937	Lonesome Ghosts (short)	Animator		uncredited
1938	Ferdinand the Bull	Animator		Ferdinand (voice; uncredited)
1938	Farmyard Symphony (short)	Animator		uncredited
1939	Ugly Duckling (short)	Animator		uncredited
1940	Pinocchio	Animation Director	Pinocchio, Geppetto	Credited as Milton Kahl
1942	Bambi	Supervising Animator	Bambi, Thumper	Credited as Milton Kahl
1943	Saludos Amigos (Short)	Animator	Donald Duck riding the llama sequence	
1943	The Grain That Built a Hemisphere (Documentary short)	Animator		uncredited
1943	Education for Death: The Making of the Nazi (Short)	Animator		uncredited
1943	Reason and Emotion (Short)	Animator		uncredited
1943	The Winged Scourge (Documentary short)	Animator		uncredited
1943	Chicken Little (short)	Animator		uncredited
1944	How to Play Football	Animator		Credited as Milton Kahl
1945	The Three Caballeros	Animator		Credited as Milton Kahl
1945	Tiger Trouble (Short)	Animator		uncredited
1945	Duck Pimples (Short)	Animator		uncredited
1945	Hockey Homicide (short)	Animator		uncredited
1946	Make Mine Music	Animator		
1946	Song of the South	Directing Animator	Br'er Rabbit, Br'er Bear, and Br'er Fox	
1947	Fun & Fancy Free	Animator	"Say It With A Slap"	uncredited
1948	Melody Time	Directing Animator	Johnny Appleseed, Pecos Bill, Slue Foot Sue	
1949	So Dear to My Heart	Animator		
1949	The Adventures of Ichabod and Mr. Toad	Directing Animator	Ratty, Mole, MacBadger, Brom Bones	
1950	Cinderella	Directing Animator	Fairy Godmother, the King, the Grand Duke	
1951	Alice in Wonderland	Directing Animator	Alice, Dodo, Pink Flamingo	
1953	Peter Pan	Directing Animator	Peter Pan, Wendy, John and Michael	
1955	Lady and the Tramp	Directing Animator	Tramp, Trusty	
1959	Sleeping Beauty	Directing Animator	Prince Philip, Sir Minstrel, Samson, King Hubert, King Stefan	
1961	One Hundred and One Dalmatians	Directing Animator	Pongo, Perdita, Roger, Anita	
1963	The Sword in the Stone	Directing Animator / Character Designer	Arthur, Merlin, Lord Ector, Sir Kay, Sir Bart, Madame Mim	
1964	Mary Poppins	Animator	Fox	
1967	The Jungle Book	Directing Animator	Shere Khan, Kaa, Mowgli, Bagheera, King Louie	
1968	Winnie the Pooh and the Blustery Day (Short)	Animator	Tigger	
1970	The Aristocats	Directing Animator	Thomas O'Malley, Duchess, Edgar, Madame Bonfamille, Georges Hautecourt	
1971	Bedknobs and Broomsticks	Animator	King Leonidas, Secretary Bird, Fisherman Bear	
1973	Robin Hood	Directing Animator	Robin Hood, Little John, Maid Marian, Lady Kluck, the Sheriff of Nottingham	
1974	Winnie the Pooh and Tigger Too (Short)	Directing Animator	Tigger	
1977	The Many Adventures of Winnie the Pooh	Animator	Tigger	
1977	The Rescuers	Directing Animator	Madame Medusa, Snoops, Penny	
1995	Frank and Ollie (Documentary)	Acknowledgment: Caricatures		
2002	Mickey's House of Villains (Video)	Animator - Segment "Lonesome Ghosts"		

== See also ==
- Ludwig Von Drake

== Sources ==
- Canemaker, John (2001). "Milt Kahl". Walt Disney's Nine Old Men and the Art of Animation. Disney Editions. pp. 125–165. ISBN 978-0786864966.
