= Ward Kimball =

American animator and jazz trombonist (1914–2002)

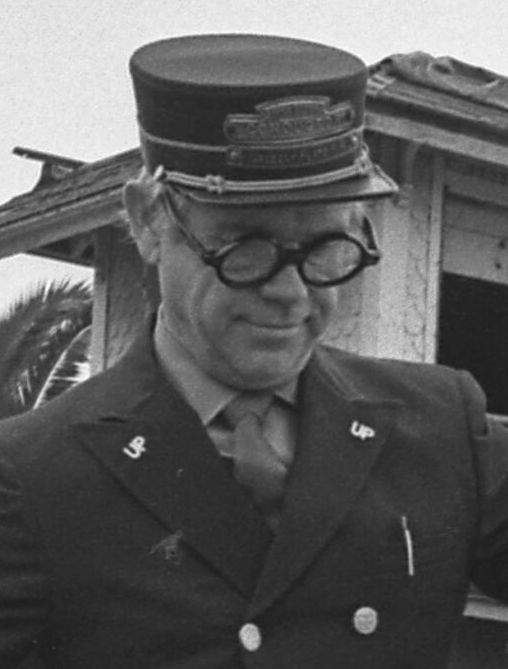
- Kimball in 1976
- Born: Ward Walrath Kimball; March 4, 1914; Minneapolis, Minnesota, U.S.
- Died: July 8, 2002 (aged 88); Arcadia, California, U.S.
- Education: Covina High School; Santa Barbara High School; Santa Barbara School of the Arts
- Occupations: Animator, musician
- Years active: 1934–1980
- Employer: Walt Disney Productions
- Known for: One of Disney's Nine Old Men
- Spouse: Betty Kimball (m. 1936)
- Children: 3
- Awards: 2 Academy Awards for Best Animated Short Film

Ward Walrath Kimball (March 4, 1914 – July 8, 2002) was an American animator employed by Walt Disney Animation Studios. He was part of Walt Disney's main team of animators, known collectively as Disney's Nine Old Men. His films have been honored with two Academy Awards for Best Animated Short Film.

Outside of his job as an animator, Kimball was a railroad enthusiast as well as a talented jazz trombonist. He founded and led the seven-piece Dixieland band Firehouse Five Plus Two, in which he played the trombone.

== Early life ==
Kimball was born on March 4, 1914, in Minneapolis. His father was a salesman who traveled widely. He grew up in the Midwest, often residing with his grandparents.

== Career ==
Kimball drawing Pecos Bill from Melody Time

While Kimball was a brilliant draftsman, he preferred to work on comical characters rather than realistic human designs. Animating came easily to him and he was constantly looking to do things differently. Because of this, Walt Disney called Ward a genius in the book The Story of Walt Disney. While there were many talented animators at Disney, Ward's efforts stand out as unique.

According to Jeff Lenburg's assessment of him, Kimball was a pioneer animator and a great innovator of his time. He instilled life to diverse Disney characters, such as Mickey Mouse, Jiminy Cricket, the Cheshire Cat, the Mad Hatter, Captain Hook and Tweedledee and Tweedledum.

Kimball attended the Santa Barbara School of the Arts in order to become a painter and illustrator. Kimball's instructor at the school suggested to him that his work should be submitted to Walt Disney Productions (later known as the Walt Disney Animation Studios), and that he should pursue a career in animation. In March 1934, a 20-year-old Kimball applied for a job at the Disney studio. In April 1934, he was hired as an inbetweener. He was then promoted to an assistant animator. He served as an assistant to animator Hamilton Luske. Kimball worked primarily in the Silly Symphony series, where his film credits include the animated short films The Wise Little Hen (1934), The Goddess of Spring (1934), and The Tortoise and the Hare (1935). He also worked on Mickey Mouse shorts, where his film credits include the short films Orphan's Benefit (1934) and Pluto's Judgement Day (1935).

In 1936, Kimball was promoted to an animator in his own right. He continued to work in the Silly Symphony series. Some of his memorable credits in this position include the animated short films Toby Tortoise Returns (1936), More Kittens (1936), and Mother Goose Goes Hollywood (1938). His first solo effort as an animator was animating a grasshopper turned musician in Woodland Café (1937).

As one of Disney's Nine Old Men, Kimball was tasked with animating on Snow White and the Seven Dwarfs (1937). The film was the first feature-length animated film by the Disney studio. Kimball spent months working on the scene in which the Seven Dwarfs are eating soup, prepared for them by Snow White. This scene, however, was ultimately cut to shorten the length of the film.

Kimball was a strikebreaker in 1941, breaking the Disney animators' strike. He was considered a "scab" by many of his peers. "I felt terrible," Kimball wrote in his journal. "Friends on the inside waving to me to come in. Friends on the outside pleading with me to stay out; Jeezus. I was on the spot!"

Following the release of Snow White, Kimball was promoted to a supervising or directing animator. He would remain in this position until his retirement in the 1970s. His employer Walt Disney was sufficiently satisfied with Kimball's work that he entrusted him with designing the new character Jiminy Cricket in the Disney Studio's next feature film, Pinocchio. It took Kimball 12 or 14 drafts before completing his final design of Jiminy. Kimball told one interviewer that he "hated" animating Jiminy Cricket: "I got sick of drawing that oval head looking in every direction.") Kimball's next major task was designing the sympathetic Crows in Dumbo (1941). Following the example of the Seven Dwarfs from Snow White, Kimball had to give each crow a distinct appearance and character.

Kimball supervised or directed the animation of several Disney animated feature films. Among them were Fantasia (1940), The Reluctant Dragon (1941) (which he also appeared in), and The Three Caballeros (1944). The last film mentioned featured the trio of Donald Duck, José Carioca, and Panchito Pistoles. According to animation historian Jeff Lenburg, The Three Caballeros is considered to have a place among the finest work of Kimball's career. The film was reportedly successful in the American box office, earning about 3 to 4 million dollars.

Kimball directed the character animation and sequences of the Pecos Bill segment in Melody Time (1948). He also worked as a senior animator for The Adventures of Ichabod and Mr. Toad (1949). In Cinderella (1950), Kimball was responsible for the characters Jaq and Gus and Lucifer the Cat. In Alice in Wonderland (1951), Kimball was responsible for Tweedledee and Tweedledum, the Walrus and the Carpenter, the Hatter and his mad tea party, and the Cheshire Cat. His other film credits include the feature films Peter Pan (1953), Mary Poppins (1964), and Bedknobs and Broomsticks (1971).

Kimball spent much of his career animating theatrical animated short films. However, he also served as a director for some of them. He and Charles August Nichols co-directed the animated short films Melody (1953) and Toot, Whistle, Plunk and Boom (1953). Melody was the Disney studio's first animated 3D film; Toot, Whistle, Plunk and Boom won the 1954 Academy Award for Best Animated Short Film and was the Disney studio's first widescreen CinemaScope animated film. Kimball also directed the short films It's Tough to Be a Bird (1969) and Dad, Can I Borrow the Car? (1970). It's Tough to Be a Bird won the Academy Award for Best Animated Short Film.

Kimball served as a screenwriter for the featurette Eyes In Outer Space (1959). The film combined live action and animation. It depicted weather satellites and explained how the weather is predicted. The film was originally theatrically released. Around 1962, it started being shown in Disneyland.

During the 1950s, the Disney studio shifted its focus from theatrical animation to television. Kimball wrote and directed three hour-long television shows about space exploration. They were Man in Space (1955), Man and the Moon (1955), and Mars and Beyond (1957). The consultants for these shows included pioneers of the Space Age, such as aerospace engineer Wernher von Braun. According to animation historian Jeff Lenburg, the three shows helped in sparking popular interest in spaceflight. Kimball was also responsible for the science-fiction two-reel cartoon Cosmic Capers (1957).

Kimball also worked (as a writer) on the live-action musical Babes in Toyland (1961). He later returned to television and directed 43 episodes of The Mouse Factory (1972–1973).

Kimball retired in 1973 and left the Disney studio. He continued, however, to serve as a consultant on special assignments. He worked on the World of Motion attraction for Disney's EPCOT Center.

== Other activities ==
Kimball was profiled by producer Jerry Fairbanks in his Paramount Pictures film short series Unusual Occupations. This 35mm Magnacolor film short was released theatrically in 1944; it focused on Kimball's backyard railroad and full-sized locomotive.

Kimball was also a jazz trombonist. He founded and led the seven-piece Dixieland band Firehouse Five Plus Two, in which he played trombone. The band made at least 13 LP records and toured clubs, college campuses and jazz festivals from the 1940s to early 1970s. Kimball once said that Walt Disney permitted the second career as long as it did not interfere with his animation work. Kimball appeared on the March 17, 1954, episode of You Bet Your Life, in which Groucho Marx coaxed him into playing his trombone with the house band. He and his partner won $75 in their quiz portion of the show, including one Disney animation question that Kimball answered easily: the answer was Pinocchio.

Kimball continued to work at Disney until 1974, working on the Disney anthology television series, being one of the writers for Babes in Toyland, creating animation for Mary Poppins, directing the animation for Bedknobs and Broomsticks, and working on titles for feature films such as The Adventures Of Bullwhip Griffin and Million Dollar Duck. His last staff work for Disney was producing and directing the Disney TV show The Mouse Factory, which ran from 1972 to 1974. He continued to do various projects on his own, even returning to do some publicity tours for the Disney corporation. He also worked on the World of Motion attraction for Disney's EPCOT Center.

Kimball also produced two editions of a volume titled Art Afterpieces, in which he revised various well-known works of art, such as putting Mona Lisa's hair up in curlers, showing Whistler's Mother watching TV, and adding a Communist flag and Russian boots to Pinkie. These masterpiece remixes are thought to have been appropriated by the street artist Banksy.

His three acting appearances on film were an uncredited role as a jazz musician (with his Firehouse Five Plus Two) in Hit Parade of 1951, an IRS Chief in Mike Jittlov's The Wizard of Speed and Time, and voicing and giving his likeness to half of the vaudeville duo "Ward and Fred" in the Mickey Mouse short The Nifty Nineties (with fellow Disney animator Fred Moore). Kimball served as host of the "Man in Space" and "Man and the Moon" episodes of Disneyland in 1955 and 1956 respectively. He hosted the second season of the 1992 PBS series Tracks Ahead. That season has since been repackaged to feature current host Spencer Christian.

As recounted in Neal Gabler's biography of Walt Disney, Ward Kimball was a key figure in spreading the urban legend that Disney had left instructions for his body to be preserved by cryonics after his death.

Amid Amidi wrote a biography of Kimball, Full Steam Ahead: The Life and Art of Ward Kimball that was projected for publication in the fall of 2012. However, publication of the biography was canceled in February 2013, which Amidi believed was due to pressure from the Disney corporation.

== Filmography ==
Year	Title	Credits	Characters
1934	The Hot Choc-late Soldiers (Short)	Animator	
1934	The Wise Little Hen	Animator	
1934	The Flying Mouse	Animator	
1934	Orphan's Benefit	Animator	
1934	Servants' Entrance	Animator	
1934	Mickey Plays Papa	Animator	
1934	The Goddess of Spring	Animator	
1935	The Tortoise and the Hare	Animator	
1935	Pluto's Judgement Day	Animator	
1936	Elmer Elephant	Animator	
1936	Toby Tortoise Returns	Writer / Animation Director	
1936	More Kittens	Animation Director	
1937	Woodland Café	Animator	
1937	Snow White and the Seven Dwarfs	Animator	
1938	Ferdinand the Bull	Animator	
1938	Mother Goose Goes Hollywood	Animator	
1939	The Autograph Hound	Animator	
1940	Pinocchio	Animation Director / Supervising Animator	Jiminy Cricket
1940	Fantasia	Animation Supervisor – Segment "The Pastoral Symphony"	Bacchus and Jacchus
1941	The Reluctant Dragon	Animator	
1941	The Little Whirlwind	Animator	
1941	The Nifty Nineties	Animator	
1941	Dumbo	Animation Director	The Crows
1942	All Together (Short)	Animator	
1942	Stop That Tank!	Animator	
1942	Saludos Amigos	Animator	
1942	How to Play Baseball	Animator	
1942	Der Fuehrer's Face	Animator	
1943	The Spirit of '43	Animator	
1943	Education for Death: The Making of the Nazi	Animator	
1943	Victory Through Air Power (Documentary)	Animator	
1943	Victory Vehicles	Animator	
1943	Reason and Emotion	Animator	
1943	Chicken Little	Animator	
1944	The Pelican and the Snipe	Animator	
1944	How to Play Football	Animator	
1944	The Three Caballeros	Animator	Title Song
1945	African Diary	Animator	
1945	Hockey Homicide	Animator	
1946	Pluto's Kid Brother	Animator	
1946	Make Mine Music	Animator (Segments Casey at the Bat, Peter and the Wolf, Willie the Operatic Whale)	
1947	Fun and Fancy Free	Directing Animator (Segments Bongo, Mickey and the Beanstalk)	
1948	Melody Time	Directing Animator (Segments Johnny Appleseed, Blame It on the Samba, Pecos Bill)	
1949	The Adventures of Ichabod and Mr. Toad	Directing Animator (Segments The Wind in the Willows, The Legend of Sleepy Hollow)	
1950	Cinderella	Directing Animator	Jaq, Gus, Lucifer
1951	Alice in Wonderland	Directing Animator / Animator	Tweedledee and Tweedledum, the Walrus, Cheshire Cat, Mad Hatter, March Hare
1951	How to Catch a Cold (Short)	Animator	
1953	Peter Pan	Directing Animator	John Darling, Chief Indian, Captain Hook
1953	Melody (Short)	Animator / Director	
1953	How to Dance (Short)	Musician	
1953	Toot, Whistle, Plunk and Boom (Short)	Animator / Director	
1955	Man in Space (Disneyland episode)	Writer / Director	
1955	Man and the Moon (Disneyland episode)	Writer / Director	
1957	Cosmic Capers (Documentary short)	Writer / Director / Producer	
1957	Mars and Beyond (Disneyland episode)	Writer / Director	
1959	Eyes in Outer Space (Documentary short)	Writer / Director / Producer	
1961	Babes in Toyland	Writer	
1964	Mary Poppins	Animator	Pearly Band
1967	Scrooge McDuck and Money (Short)	Animator	
1967	The Adventures of Bullwhip Griffin	Animator	
1968	Escalation (TV Short)	Director	
1969	It's Tough to Be a Bird	Writer / Director / Producer	
1970	Dad... Can I Borrow the Car?	Director / Producer	
1971	Bedknobs and Broomsticks	Animation Director	
1972–73	The Mouse Factory	Director / Producer (43 episodes)	

== Railfan ==
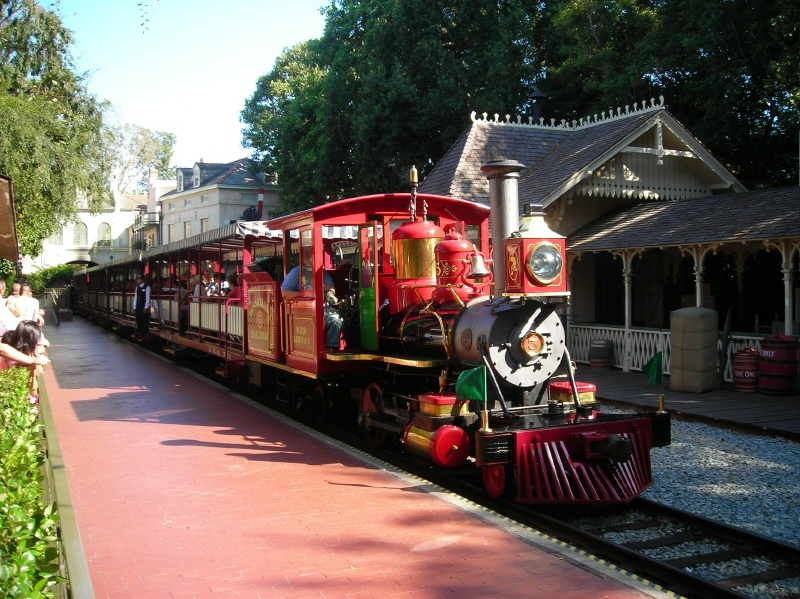
The Ward Kimball locomotive pulling into New Orleans Square Station in Disneyland

I hope I can hold out for the big one, the great earthquake. Then when California slips into the Pacific Ocean, then me and all my trains can fall into the great abyss and into oblivion.

— Ward Kimball

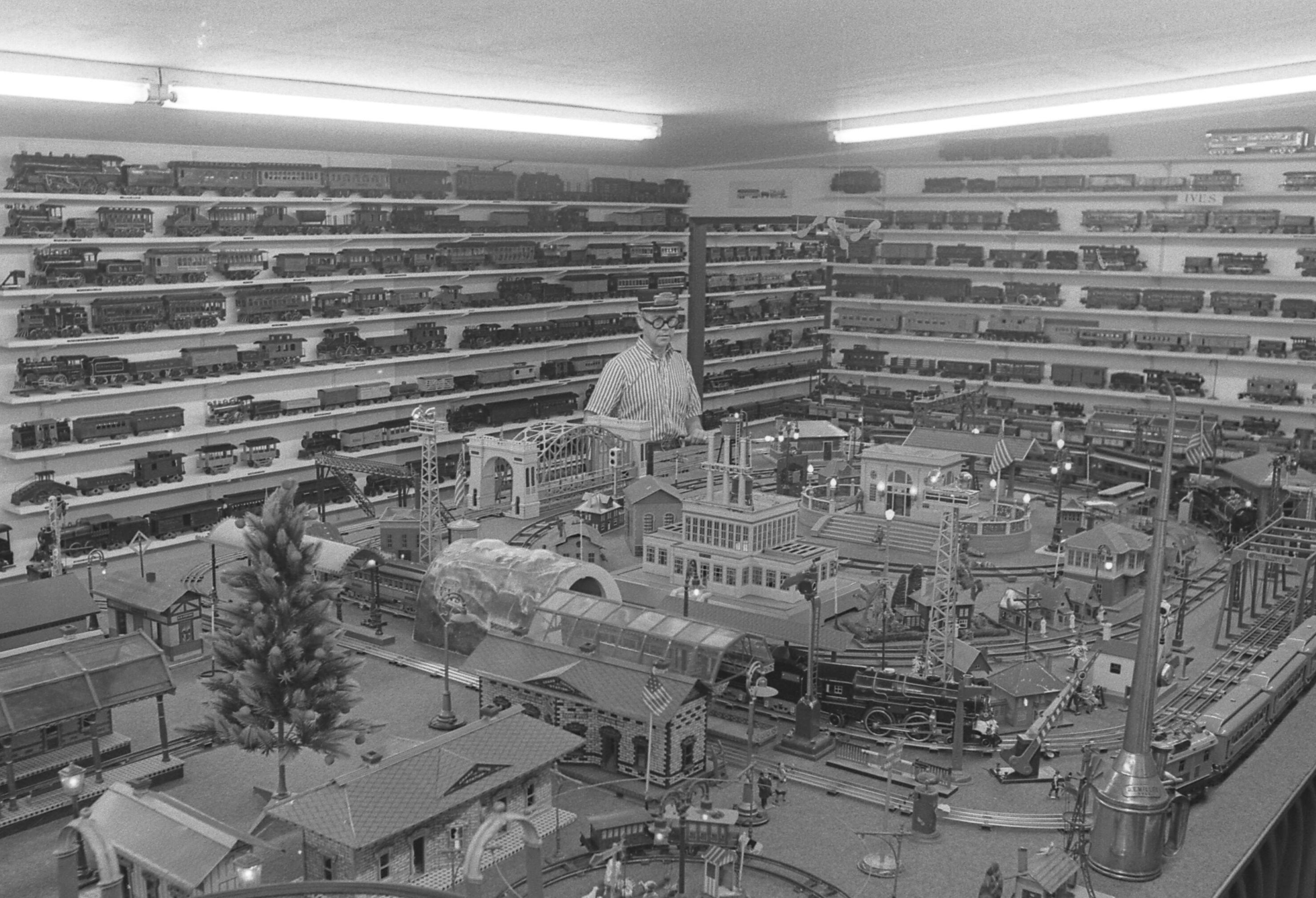
Kimball operating his model train in 1977

Along with his employer and friend Walt Disney, and friend Ollie Johnston, Kimball collected old railroad ephemera. He was also an avid collector of model trains. Kimball was an avid railway enthusiast from a young age, having grown up in Parsons, Kansas, near the massive Katy Railroad facilities. One of his first childhood drawings was of a locomotive, and he said that his mother called him a "marked" baby because of his early infatuation with railroads.

Kimball donated his 3 ft (914 mm) narrow-gauge collection to the Southern California Railway Museum (formerly the Orange Empire Railway Museum) in Perris, California. A full-size steam locomotive, which Kimball ran on his private 3-acre (1.2 ha) backyard railroad known as Grizzly Flats Railroad in San Gabriel, California, bears some of his original artwork on the headlamp and cab, and is on permanent display at the museum. Kimball's roundhouse also included two small steam engines that had been used on sugar cane plantations, one of which was his and the other was owned by his friend, noted railroad historian Gerald M. Best. In recognition of his love of railroading and support of the Southern California Railway Museum, the Perris Transit Center, where the museum's historic trains travel, is dedicated to Mr. Kimball. In a rare deviation from its usually tight copyright policy, the Disney corporation allowed the city to decorate the transit center with Kimball's artwork. The center is currently served by Riverside Transit Agency buses, with train service as part of the Metrolink 91/Perris Valley Line.

Kimball is credited with helping Walt Disney for the inspiration to install the Disneyland Railroad at Disneyland. The inspiration for the Disneyland Railroad also partly came from Disney's personal 7 1/4 in (184 mm) gauge, live steam backyard Carolwood Pacific Railroad, which Kimball had partially constructed. Kimball's Grizzly Flats train station served as the model for the Disneyland Frontierland Train Station. As a tribute to Kimball, Engine No. 5 of the Disneyland Railroad is named the Ward Kimball.

In addition, Kimball also designed the logo for the Wildcat Railroad in Los Gatos, California, owned by Billy Jones, a friend of Walt Disney who was an engineer for the Disneyland Railroad during its first week of operation.

Kimball's talents are also evident in the reproduction steam locomotives built for the National Park Service at the Golden Spike National Historic Site at Promontory, Utah. Kimball helped match colors with an engine at the Smithsonian Institution and painted the artwork for the replicas of the Union Pacific No. 119 and Central Pacific Jupiter built by O'Connor Engineering Laboratories for the Park Service. Kimball was also in the 1975 video Model Railroading Unlimited as the host in the beginning of the movie and was showing parts of his GFRR. Kimball was featured in the 1987 Great Toy Train Layouts of America book and in the first installment of the Great Toy Train Layouts of America video series in 1988, produced by TM Books and Video. Kimball was a longtime member of the Train Collectors Association, a hobby association with the mission of preserving and promoting the history and enjoyment of toy trains through research, education, and community; setting collecting standards; and fostering appreciation for "Tinplate Toy Trains" and model railroading via museums, libraries, conventions, and local events for hobbyists worldwide. He was the national president of the organization from 1974 to 1975 and personally helped design some of the distinctive features of their national headquarters building in Strasburg, Pennsylvania.

== Escalation ==
In 1968, Kimball directed a two-minute animated short called Escalation, which criticized Lyndon B. Johnson's Vietnam War policy. The short is unique for being the only animated cartoon made independently from the Disney Studios by one of Disney's Nine Old Men. The short is further noticeable for its satirical edge and political and erotic content.

== Death ==
Kimball died in 2002 in Arcadia, California of complications from pneumonia at age 88. In 2005, the Disneyland Railroad named its newly acquired locomotive No. 5 "Ward Kimball" in his memory.

== Archive ==
The Academy Film Archive houses the Kimball Family Collection which includes over 60 home movie reels, as well as short films, TV spots, and jazz band performances, serving to document Ward's personal interests and moments in his extraordinary career. The collection also includes home movies and shorts by his son, filmmaker and animator John Kimball. The archive has preserved several of the Kimball family home movies, including family vacations to Death Valley and Disneyland.

== See also ==
- Rail transport in Walt Disney Parks and Resorts

== Sources ==
- Amendola, Dana (2015). All Aboard: The Wonderful World of Disney Trains (1st ed.). Disney Editions. ISBN 978-1-4231-1714-8.
- Lenburg, Jeff (2006), "Kimball, Ward Walrath", Who's Who in Animated Cartoons: An International Guide to Film and Television's Award-Winning and Legendary Animators, Hal Leonard Corporation, ISBN 978-1557836717
