= Man in Space =

- Disneyland episode
- Episode no.: Season 1 Episode 20
- Directed by: Ward Kimball
- Written by: Ward Kimball; William Bosche
- Editing by: Archie Dattelbaum
- Original air date: March 9, 1955

"Man in Space" is an episode of the American television series Disneyland which originally aired March 9, 1955 on ABC. It was directed by Disney animator Ward Kimball. This Disneyland episode (set in Tomorrowland), was narrated partly by Kimball and also by such scientists Willy Ley, Heinz Haber, and Wernher von Braun, as well as Dick Tufeld of Lost in Space fame.

The show begins with a brief, lighthearted history of rockets, then presents discussions of satellites, a practical look (through humorous animation) at what humans will have to face in space (both physically and psychologically, such as momentum, weightlessness, radiation, even space sickness) and an imaginary view of a rocket's takeoff into space. The next episodes in this series were "Man and the Moon" and "Mars and Beyond", airing in seasons 2 and 4, respectively.

== Reuse ==
"Man in Space" was edited into a featurette to play in theaters, accompanying "Davy Crockett and the River Pirates".

An adaptation of the episode was published (under the title "Walt Disney's Man in Space: A Science Feature from Tomorrowland") by Dell Comics as "Four Color" #716 in 1956, scripted by Don R. Christensen with art by Tony Sgroi. It was a "novelization" in comic book form of two Walt Disney television programs, "Man in Space" (1955) and "Man and the Moon" (1955). Also found as a 1956 UK reprint as A World Distributors Movie Classic (#45) and a 1959 combined reprint with the other two Dell Comics adaptations of "Man in Space" films as Walt Disney's Man in Space (Dell Comics Giant #27).

=== Educational use ===
Part of this episode was excerpted and released in 1964 as All About Weightlessness.

It was also made into a "Tomorrowland adventure" book for classroom use in 1959 as Man in Space: A Tomorrowland Adventure. Walt Disney Productions. Adapted for school use by Willy Ley, Illustrated by Carbe, Nino. Syracuse, NY: LW Singer Co. Inc. (48 p.) 21 cm. Softcover.

== Critical reception ==
About 40 million people watched the episode. It was nominated for Best Documentary Short.

=== Government interest ===
A copy of the show was requested by United States President Dwight D. Eisenhower to show to the Pentagon rocket experts. The chair of the Soviet commission for spaceflight, Leonid I. Sedov, also requested a copy.

The show also contributed, greatly, to public knowledge and interest in the possibility of human spaceflight and in some ways led directly to public demand for a three-stage rocket (as was described by Wernher von Braun in "Man in Space") that would eventually be developed into the Saturn V Rocket of the Apollo Program.

== Home media ==
The episode was released on May 18, 2004, on Walt Disney Treasures: Tomorrow Land.

The episode, along with "Mars and Beyond", was added to Disney+ in June 2020.

== See also ==
- "Man Will Conquer Space Soon!"
