= Elmer Elephant =

1936 film

- Directed by: Wilfred Jackson
- Produced by: Walt Disney
- Starring: Jeanie Roberts; Pinto Colvig; Hal Rees; Leone LeDoux; Carlisle Tupper; Gay Seabrook; Tommy Tucker; Mason Colvig; Claire Mead; Celia McCann; Clarence Nash
- Music by: Leigh Harline
- Animation by: Al Eugster; Paul Hopkins; Milt Kahl; Ward Kimball; Hamilton Luske; Wolfgang Reitherman; Milt Schaffer; Edward Strickland; Bob Wickersham
- Layouts by: Ferdinand Horvath
- Backgrounds by: Maurice Noble
- Production company: Walt Disney Productions
- Distributed by: United Artists
- Release date: March 28, 1936
- Running time: 8:29
- Country: United States
- Language: English

Elmer Elephant is a Silly Symphonies animated short film produced by Walt Disney, directed by Wilfred Jackson and released on March 28, 1936.

== Plot ==
Elmer Elephant arrives in the yard below Tillie Tiger's treehouse, where several other animal children are celebrating Tillie's birthday. He has a crush on Tillie, and attempts to give her a bouquet of flowers, but Joey the Hippo blows out the candles a bit too hard as Elmer arrives, spattering cake icing all over Elmer's face. Tillie fusses over Elmer, cleans him up and accepts his flowers. She then goes into her treehouse to get something, telling Elmer to have fun at the party up until she returns.

After Tillie leaves, a jealous tiger boy leads the other children in teasing Elmer about his trunk, calling it a "funny nose like a rubber hose". Driven away from the party, Elmer goes to a local pond to sulk. Upset at his reflection, he tries to fold up his nose, but it pops back out again, which in turn causes his nose in the reflection to become longer. He kicks his trunk in frustration, causing it to hit his face and he begins to cry. An elderly giraffe tells him how he was once teased himself over his neck, but learned to ignore it. He shows Elmer some pelicans that look like Jimmy Durante, pointing out that Elmer is not the only one with a funny nose, which cheers Elmer up.

A fire suddenly breaks out at Tillie's treehouse, trapping her. The monkey fire brigade and the other animal children attempt to put it out, but their efforts are thwarted by the living fire. Elmer, with assistance from the Giraffe and the pelicans, hurries back and uses his trunk like a fire hose, extinguishing the blaze. He catches Tillie with his trunk as she falls from the disintegrating house, earning the other children's respect and Tillie's love. Tillie and Elmer share a kiss, hiding behind Elmer's ear for privacy.

== Later appearances ==
Elmer is seen as a precursor to Dumbo, the common trait of both characters being that they have insecurities about a specific body part they get ridiculed for (in this case, Elmer's trunk) and eventually gaining respect through the use of the body part in question (in this case, Elmer using his trunk to put out the fire and saving Tilly).

Elmer would later go on to star in a serial in the Silly Symphony comic strip. "The Life and Adventures of Elmer Elephant", appearing from October 27, 1935, to January 12, 1936, retold the story of the Elmer short. Three years later, Elmer was featured in the strip again, in a continuity called "Timid Elmer". This story was based on a planned second Elmer short, which was abandoned before completion. In this story, published from December 4, 1938, to February 12, 1939, Elmer's girlfriend Tillie Tiger is tired of his cowardice, and takes up with a bully, Gooch Gorilla. After talking to a wise giraffe, Elmer gains the confidence to fight the bullies and win back Tillie's respect.

Like the Three Little Pigs before him, he would also become a popular character in merchandising, but he never made another theatrical appearance again, with the exceptions of the crowd shots in the later Silly Symphonies short Toby Tortoise Returns and a cameo appearance in Who Framed Roger Rabbit. Elmer and Tillie also made brief cameos in the Mickey Mouse episode "Carried Away" as tourists in Niagara Falls.

From 1983 to 1997, this short was also the featured subject of DTV's music video of English rock group Yes' "Owner of a Lonely Heart", and featured in one episode of Sing Me a Story with Belle.

== Home media ==
The short was released on December 4, 2001, on Walt Disney Treasures: Silly Symphonies - The Historic Musical Animated Classics.

It was also released as a bonus feature, alongside fellow Silly Symphony short The Flying Mouse, on DVD and Blu-Ray releases of Dumbo.
