= It's Tough to Be a Bird =

1969 animated short film by Ward Kimball

- Theatrical release poster
- Directed by: Ward Kimball
- Story by: Ted Berman; Ward Kimball
- Produced by: Ward Kimball
- Starring: Ruth Buzzi; Richard Bakalyan; John Emerson; Jim Swain; Ann Lord; Hank Schloss; Walter Perkins; Rolf Darbo
- Edited by: Lloyd L. Richardson
- Music by: George Bruns
- Animation by: Eric Larson; Art Stevens
- Layouts by: Joe Hale
- Color process: Technicolor
- Production company: Walt Disney Productions
- Distributed by: Buena Vista Distribution
- Release date: December 10, 1969
- Running time: 21 minutes
- Language: English

It's Tough to Be a Bird is a 1969 American animated educational short film directed by Ward Kimball and produced by Walt Disney Productions. The short won the Academy Award for Best Short Subject, Cartoons at the 42nd Academy Awards in 1970 and was nominated for the BAFTA Award for Best Animated Film in 1971. This was the last animated short film produced by Disney to win an Academy Award until Paperman (2012), the last animated short film distributed by Buena Vista Pictures Distribution to win such an award until Pixar's Geri's Game (1997) and the final animated cartoon short released by Disney in the golden age of American animation.

== Summary ==
In the short, a red bird (voiced by Richard Bakalyan) explains how birds have contributed to human culture, even as people often try to kill them. He claims this may be because humans were jealous that birds can fly but people cannot, mentioning the legend of Icarus and featured films of early unsuccessful flying machines.

In Disney's D-TV in the 1980s, clips from this short were set to Bobby Day's cover of "Rockin' Robin".

== Cast ==
- Ruth Buzzi as Soprano
- Richard Bakalyan as M.C. Bird
- John Emerson as Bird Fancier
- Jim Swain as Bird Fancier
- Ann Lord as Bird Fancier
- Hank Schloss as Bird Fancier
- Walter Perkins as Bird Fancier
- Rolf Darbo as Bird Fancier
- Ward Kimball as Bird Fancier (uncredited)

== See also ==
- List of American films of 1969
- Birdwatching
- National Audubon Society - featured in the film
- Hinkley, Ohio - featured in the film
- Noah's Ark
