= The Tortoise and the Hare (film) =

- Toby Tortoise and Max Hare
- Directed by: Wilfred Jackson
- Story by: Larry Clemmons
- Produced by: Walt Disney
- Starring: Pinto Colvig; Eddie Holden; Ned Norton; Marcellite Garner
- Music by: Frank Churchill
- Animation by: Dick Lundy; Louie Schmitt; Dick Huemer; Eric Larson; Frenchy de Tremaudan; Milt Schaffer
- Color process: Technicolor
- Production company: Walt Disney Productions
- Distributed by: United Artists
- Release date: January 5, 1935
- Running time: 8:17
- Language: English

The Tortoise and the Hare is an American animated short film from the Silly Symphonies series, released by United Artists, produced by Walt Disney and directed by Wilfred Jackson. Based on an Aesop's fable of the same name, it won the 1934 Oscar for Best Short Subject: Cartoons. This cartoon is also believed to be one of the inspirations for Bugs Bunny by Warner Bros. Cartoons, who first appeared in 1940.

== Plot ==
Max Hare is the heavy favorite to win a major sporting event. He is cocky, athletic, and incredibly fast. His challenger, Toby Tortoise, is teased and jeered for being sluggish and clumsy. He does seem to have the ability to stretch, which comes in handy in certain situations. Max tells Toby that he intends to play fair, but it seems obvious that Max is just out to humiliate his competition. The race begins and Max zooms off. It takes an extra nudge from the starting line to get Toby going.

Max seems to dominate the race, zooming past everything down the road. At one point, Max pretends to nap under a tree, just to watch Toby's progress. Thinking that Max really is asleep, Toby quietly creeps past him, but not for long after Max gets up and bolts past him again. A little farther down the road, Max passes a girls' school, and stops to talk to the female bunnies. As Toby lumbers past, the girls invite him to stop as well, but Toby politely declines their offer, because he is committed to finish the race. Even though Toby is now in the lead, Max oughts to stay for a while, because he is confident that he will have no trouble catching up with Toby, due to how slow he is. Max uses the girls' sports field to show off his amazing athletic skills in archery, baseball, and tennis.

Suddenly, Max hears the crowd cheering and sees that Toby is not far from the finishing line. He kisses the girls farewell and charges off, still confident that he will win easily. Toby sees Max catching up and picks up his pace by stretching his legs. In the end, the race is close. Max crosses the finishing line and skids to a rough halt. When he gets up and dusts himself off, he realizes that he has lost by a "neck's length". The crowd rushes to congratulate the winner: Toby Tortoise.

== Other appearances ==
Toby Tortoise and Max Hare reappear in the 1936 cartoon short Toby Tortoise Returns.

The Silly Symphony Sunday comic strip ran a two-month-long sequence called "The Boarding-School Mystery" from December 23, 1934, to February 17, 1935, featuring Toby Tortoise and Max Hare.

Toby and Max are part of the characters singing the opening theme in the TV show The Mickey Mouse Club. The girl bunnies and the animal pedestrians make cameos in Toontown, while Toby Tortoise is on a poster in the Toontown alleyway and appears during the final scene of the 1988 film Who Framed Roger Rabbit. Toby and Max also appear as guests in the 2001 series House of Mouse. Toby and Max make brief non-speaking cameos in the Mickey Mouse episode "Carried Away".

== Voice cast ==
- Toby Tortoise: Eddie Holden
- Max Hare: Ned Norton
- Starter: Pinto Colvig
- Miss Cottontail girl: Marcellite Garner

== Home media ==
The short was released on December 4, 2001, on Walt Disney Treasures: Silly Symphonies - The Historic Musical Animated Classics.
