= The Fox and the Hound =

1981 American animated film

- Original theatrical release poster
- Directed by: Art Stevens; Ted Berman; Richard Rich
- Story by: Larry Clemmons; Ted Berman; David Michener; Peter Young; Burny Mattinson; Steve Hulett; Earl Kress; Vance Gerry
- Based on: The Fox and the Hound by Daniel P. Mannix
- Produced by: Ron Miller; Wolfgang Reitherman; Art Stevens
- Starring: Mickey Rooney; Kurt Russell; Pearl Bailey; Jack Albertson; Sandy Duncan; Jeanette Nolan; Pat Buttram; John Fiedler; John McIntire; Richard Bakalyan; Paul Winchell; Keith Coogan; Corey Feldman
- Edited by: James Melton; Jim Koford
- Music by: Buddy Baker
- Production company: Walt Disney Productions
- Distributed by: Buena Vista Distribution
- Release date: July 10, 1981
- Running time: 83 minutes
- Country: United States
- Language: English
- Budget: $12 million
- Box office: $63.5 million

The Fox and the Hound is a 1981 American animated buddy film produced by Walt Disney Productions and directed by Ted Berman, Richard Rich, and Art Stevens. Mickey Rooney and Kurt Russell respectively star as the voices of Tod and Copper, with Pearl Bailey, Jack Albertson (in his final film role), Sandy Duncan, Jeanette Nolan, Pat Buttram, John Fiedler, John McIntire, Dick Bakalyan, Paul Winchell, Keith Mitchell, and Corey Feldman in supporting roles. Loosely based on the 1967 novel by Daniel P. Mannix, the film tells the story of the unlikely friendship between a red fox named Tod and a hound named Copper, as they struggle against their emerging instincts and the realization that they are meant to be adversaries.

Walt Disney Productions first obtained the film rights to the novel by Daniel P. Mannix in 1967; however, actual development on the film would not occur until spring 1977. It marked the last involvement of the remaining members of Disney's Nine Old Men, which included Frank Thomas and Ollie Johnston. Though they had involvement in early development of the film, it was ultimately handed over to a new generation of animators following the retirement of the old animators. As such, it was the first film for future directors, including Tim Burton, Brad Bird, and John Lasseter. During production, its release was delayed by over six months following the abrupt departure of Don Bluth and his team of animators. Further concerns were raised over the handling of the scene in which Chief is hit by a train, which was originally planned to result in him dying. After debating the handling of the scene, the filmmakers decided to change the death into a non-fatal injury by which he suffers a broken leg.

The film was released to theaters on July 10, 1981, by Buena Vista Distribution. It was a financial success, earning $39.9 million domestically and receiving mixed reviews from critics. It was nominated for three awards, of which it won one. At the time of its release, it was the most expensive animated film produced to date, costing $12 million. It was re-released to theaters on March 25, 1988. An intermediate follow-up, The Fox and the Hound 2, was released directly-to-DVD on December 12, 2006.

== Plot ==
After a young red fox is orphaned, Big Mama the owl and her friends, Dinky the sparrow and Boomer the woodpecker, arrange for him to be adopted by a kindly farmer named Widow Tweed, who names him Tod. Meanwhile, her neighbor, hunter Amos Slade, brings home a young hound puppy named Copper and introduces him to his hunting dog, Chief, who is at first annoyed by him but then learns to love him. One day, Tod and Copper meet and become best friends, pledging eternal friendship. Amos grows frustrated at Copper for constantly wandering off to play and places him on a leash. While playing with Copper outside his barrel, Tod accidentally awakens Chief. Amos and Chief chase him until they are stopped by Tweed. After an argument, Amos threatens to kill Tod if he trespasses on his property again. Hunting season comes, and Amos takes Chief and Copper into the wilderness for the interim. Meanwhile, Big Mama, Dinky, and Boomer attempt to explain to Tod that Copper will soon become his enemy. However, he naively insists that they will remain friends forever.

The following spring, Tod and Copper reach adulthood. Copper returns as an expert hunting dog who is expected to track down foxes. Late at night, Tod sneaks over to visit him. Their conversation awakens Chief, who alerts Amos. A chase ensues, and Copper catches Tod but lets him go while diverting Amos. Chief catches Tod as he attempts an escape on a railroad track, but an oncoming train strikes him, resulting in him falling into the river below and breaking his leg. Enraged by this, Copper and Amos blame Tod for the accident and vow vengeance. Realizing Tod is no longer safe with her, Tweed leaves him at a game reserve. After a disastrous night on his own in the woods, Big Mama introduces him to Vixey, a female fox who helps him adapt to life there.

Amos and Copper trespass into the reserve and hunt Tod and Vixey. The chase climaxes when they inadvertently provoke an attack from a grizzly bear. Amos trips and falls into one of his own traps, dropping his rifle slightly out of reach. Copper violently fights the bear, but he is almost killed by it. Tod comes to Copper's rescue and battles it until both he and the bear fall down a waterfall. As Copper approaches Tod as he lies wounded in the lake below, Amos appears, ready to shoot Tod. Copper positions himself in front of Tod to prevent Amos from doing so, refusing to move away. Amos, understanding Tod had saved their lives from the bear, decides to spare Tod for Copper, lowers his rifle, and leaves with Copper. Tod and Copper share one last smile before parting.

At home, Tweed nurses Amos back to health, much to his humiliation. As he lies down to take a nap, Copper smiles as he remembers the day when he first met Tod. At the same moment, Vixey joins Tod on top of a hill as they both look down on Amos' and Tweed's homes.

== Voice cast ==
- Mickey Rooney as Tod, a young fox who, after being orphaned, was raised by Widow Tweed, and becomes Copper's best friend
  - Keith Coogan as Young Tod
- Kurt Russell as Copper, a young hound who becomes Tod's best friend, and whom Amos Slade raises to become a hunter
  - Corey Feldman as Young Copper
- Pearl Bailey as Big Mama, an owl who cares for and advises Tod
- Jack Albertson as Amos Slade, Copper's owner, an old hunter who develops a hatred for Tod
- Sandy Duncan as Vixey, a young vixen with whom Tod falls in love
- Jeanette Nolan as Widow Tweed, an old farmer who is in charge of raising Tod
- Pat Buttram as Chief, Amos Slade's old, stubborn dog
- John Fiedler as The Porcupine, a forest dweller who offers shelter to Tod
- John McIntire as The Badger, a grumpy forest dweller
- Richard Bakalyan as Dinky, a sparrow friend of Tod, always accompanied by Boomer
- Paul Winchell as Boomer, a woodpecker friend of Tod, always accompanied by Dinky
- "Squeaks the Caterpillar" is listed as playing "himself"

== Production ==
=== Development ===
In May 1967, shortly before the novel won the Dutton Animal Book Award, it was reported that Walt Disney Productions had obtained the film rights to it. In spring 1977, development began on the project, after Wolfgang Reitherman had read the original novel and decided that it would make for a good animated feature, as one of his sons had once owned a pet fox years before. The title was initially reported as The Fox and the Hounds, but the filmmakers dropped the plural as the story began to focus more and more on the two leads. Reitherman was the film's original director, along with Art Stevens as codirector. A power struggle between the two directors and coproducer Ron Miller broke out over key sections of the film, with Miller supporting the younger Stevens. Miller instructed Reitherman to surrender reins over to the junior personnel, but Reitherman resisted due to a lack of trust in the young animators.

In an earlier version of the film, Chief was slated to die as he did in the novel. However, the scene was modified to have him survive with a broken leg. Animator Ron Clements, who had briefly transitioned into the story department, protested, "Chief has to die. The picture doesn't work if he just breaks his leg. Copper doesn't have motivation to hate the fox." Likewise, younger members of the story team pleaded with Stevens to have him killed. He countered, "Geez, we never killed a main character in a Disney film and we're not starting now!" The younger crew members took the problem to upper management, who would also back Stevens. Ollie Johnston's test animation of Chief stomping around the house with his leg in a cast was eventually kept, and Randy Cartwright reanimated the scene where Copper finds his body and had him animate his eyes opening and closing so the audience knew that he was not dead.

Another dispute erupted when Reitherman, in thinking the film lacked a strong second act, decided to add a musical sequence of two swooping cranes voiced by Phil Harris and Charo. These characters would sing a silly song titled "Scoobie-Doobie Doobie Doo, Let Your Body Turn to Goo" to Tod after he was dropped in the forest. Charo had recorded the song and several voice tracks which were storyboarded, and live-action reference footage was shot of her wearing a sweaty pink leotard. However, the scene was strongly disliked by studio personnel who felt the song was a distraction from the main plot, with Stevens stating, "We can't let that sequence in the movie! It's totally out of place!" He notified studio management, and after many story conferences, the scene was removed. Reitherman later walked into his office, slumped in a chair, and said, "I dunno, Art, maybe this is a young man's medium." He later moved on to undeveloped projects such as Catfish Bend.

=== Animation ===
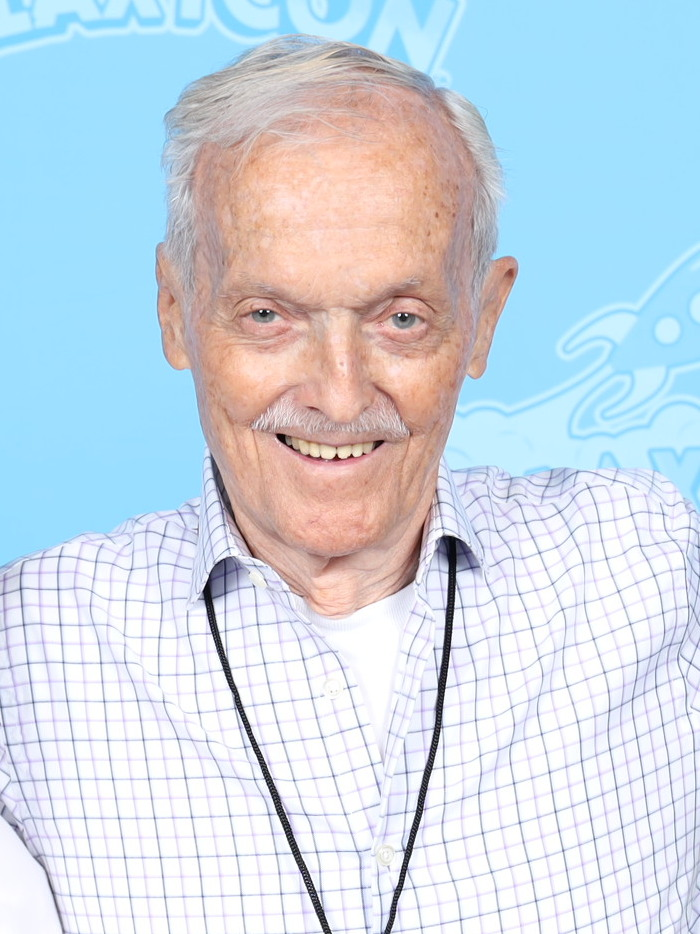
The departure of Don Bluth, seen here in 2023, as well as several other animators caused the film's original release date of Christmas 1980 to be delayed by over six months.

By late 1978, Frank Thomas, Ollie Johnston, and Cliff Nordberg had completed their animation. Thomas had animated scenes of Tod and Copper using dialogue Larry Clemmons had written and recorded with the child actors. The film would mark the last one to have the involvement of Disney's Nine Old Men, who had retired early during production, and animation was turned over to the next generation of directors and animators, which included John Lasseter, John Musker, Ron Clements, Glen Keane, Tim Burton, Brad Bird, Henry Selick, Chris Buck, Mike Gabriel, and Mark Dindal, all of whom would finalize the animation and complete the film's production. These animators had moved through the in-house animation training program and would play an important role in the Disney Renaissance of the 1980s and 1990s.

However, the transition between the old guard and the new resulted in arguments over how to handle the film. Reitherman had his own ideas on the designs and layouts that should be used, but the newer team backed Stevens. Animator Don Bluth animated several scenes, including of Widow Tweed milking her cow, Abigail, while his team worked on the rest of the sequence, and when she fires at Amos' automobile. Nevertheless, Bluth and the new animators felt that Reitherman was too stern and out of touch, and on Bluth's 42nd birthday, September 13, 1979, he, Gary Goldman, and John Pomeroy entered Ron Miller's office and turned in their resignations. Soon after, 13 more animators followed suit in turning in their resignations. Though Bluth and his team had animated substantial scenes, they asked not to receive screen credit.

Following the resignation of the animation staff, Miller mandated their immediate departure from the studio by noon that same day and subsequently rescheduled the film's release from Christmas 1980 to the summer of 1981. New animators were hired and promoted to fill the ranks. To compensate for the lack of experience of the new animators, much of the quality control would rely upon a network of veteran assistant animators. Four years after production started, the film was finished with approximately 360,000 drawings, 110,000 painted cels, and 1,100 painted backgrounds making up the finished product. A total of 180 people, including 24 animators, worked on the film.

=== Casting ===
Early into production, the principal characters such as Young Tod, Young Copper, Big Mama, and Amos Slade had already been cast. The supporting roles were filled by Disney voice regulars including Pat Buttram as Chief, Paul Winchell as Boomer, and Mickey Rooney, who had just finished filming Pete's Dragon (1977), as Adult Tod. Jeanette Nolan was the second choice for Widow Tweed after Helen Hayes turned down the role. The last role to be cast was Adult Copper. Jackie Cooper had auditioned for the role but left the project when he demanded more money than the studio was willing to pay. While filming the Elvis (1979) television film, former Disney young actor Kurt Russell was cast following a reading that had impressed the filmmakers and completed his dialogue in two recording sessions. The growling vocals for the bear were provided by sound effects artist Jimmy MacDonald.

== Soundtrack ==
The Fox and the Hound

Soundtrack album by Various artists
- Released: 1981
- Recorded: 1977–1981
- Genres: Children's, classical
- Label: Walt Disney

The soundtrack album for the film was released in 1981 by Disneyland Records. It contains songs written by Stan Fidel, Jim Stafford, and Jeffrey Patch.

=== Track listing ===
No.	Title	Writer(s)	Performer(s)	Length
1.	"Best of Friends"	Stan Fidel	Pearl Bailey
2.	"Lack of Education"	Jim Stafford	Pearl Bailey
3.	"A Huntin' Man"	Jim Stafford	Jack Albertson
4.	"Goodbye May Seem Forever"	Jeffrey Patch	Jeanette Nolan & Chorus
5.	"Appreciate the Lady"	Jim Stafford	Pearl Bailey

== Release ==
The film's original release was accompanied in most theatres by the short film Once Upon a Mouse.

=== Marketing ===
The Fox and the Hound hand puppets and a puppet theater could be obtained through a mail-in offer and the purchase of Dial or Tone soap bars. Smucker's gave away a pair of The Fox and the Hound beverage mugs, followed by a pair of stuffed toys in August 1981, when customers purchased their products and sent mail-in offers.

=== Box office ===
In its original release, the film grossed $39.9 million in domestic grosses, the highest for an animated film at the time from its initial release. Its distributor rentals were reported to be $14.2 million, while its international rentals totaled $43 million. It was rereleased theatrically on March 25, 1988, where it grossed $23.5 million. It has had a lifetime gross of $63.5 million across its original release and reissue.

=== Home media ===
The film was first released on VHS on March 4, 1994, as the last entry in the Walt Disney Classics line. This release was placed into moratorium on April 30, 1995. On May 2, 2000, it was released on Region 1 DVD for the first time as part of the Walt Disney Gold Classic Collection line, along with a simultaneous VHS re-issue as part of the same video line on the same day. This edition went into moratorium in January 2006. Soon after, a 25th anniversary special edition DVD was released on October 10, 2006.

The film was released on Blu-ray on August 9, 2011, commemorating its 30th anniversary as part of a 3-disc Blu-ray/DVD combo pack that was bundled as a 2-movie Collection Edition featuring The Fox and the Hound 2 on the same Blu-ray Disc, as well as separate DVD versions of both films. Featuring a new digital restoration, the Blu-ray transfer presents the film for the first time in 1.66:1 widescreen and also features 5.1 DTS-HD Master Audio. The Fox and the Hound 2 is presented in 1.78:1 widescreen and features the same audio channel as the first film. A DVD-only edition of the 2-movie Collection, again featuring both films on separate discs, was also released on the same day.

== Critical reception ==
=== Initial reviews ===
Vincent Canby of The New York Times claimed that the film "breaks no new ground whatsoever", while describing it as "a pretty, relentlessly cheery, old-fashioned sort of Disney cartoon feature, chock-full of bouncy songs of an upbeatness that is stickier than Krazy Glue and played by animals more anthropomorphic than the humans that occasionally appear." He further commented that the film "is rather overstuffed with whimsy and folksy dialogue. It also possesses a climax that could very well scare the daylights out of the smaller tykes in the audience, though all ends well. Parents who don't relish chaperoning their tykes to see the movie, but find they must anyway, can take heart in the knowledge that the running time is 83 minutes. That's about as short as you can get these days." Sheila Benson of the Los Angeles Times praised the animation but criticized the story for playing it too safe. She acknowledged that the writers were "protecting us from important stuff: from rage, from pain, from loss. By these lies, done for our own good, of course, they also limit the growth that is possible." David Ansen of Newsweek stated, "Adults may wince at some of the sticky-sweet songs, but the movie is not intended for grownups."

Richard Corliss of Time magazine praised the film for its intelligent story about prejudice. He argued that it shows that biased attitudes can poison even the deepest relationships, and its bittersweet ending delivers a powerful and important moral message to audiences. Roger Ebert of the Chicago Sun-Times also praised it, saying, "For all of its familiar qualities, this movie marks something of a departure for the Disney studio, and its movement is in an interesting direction. The Fox and the Hound is one of those relatively rare Disney animated features that contains a useful lesson for its younger audiences. It's not just cute animals and frightening adventures and a happy ending; it's also a rather thoughtful meditation on how society determines our behavior."

=== Retrospective reviews ===
TV Guide gave the film four out of five stars, saying, "The animation here is better than average (veteran Disney animators Wolfgang Reitherman and Art Stevens supervised the talents of a new crop of artists that developed during a 10-year program at the studio), though not quite up to the quality of Disney Studios in its heyday. Still, this film has a lot of 'heart' and is wonderful entertainment for both kids and their parents. Listen for a number of favorites among the voices." Michael Scheinfeld of Common Sense Media gave its quality a rating of 4 out of 5 stars, stating, "It develops into a thoughtful examination of friendship and includes some mature themes, especially loss."

In The Animated Movie Guide, Jerry Beck considered the film "average", though he praises the voice work of Pearl Bailey as Big Mama and the extreme dedication to detail shown by animator Glen Keane in crafting the fight scene between Copper, Tod, and the bear. In his book The Disney Films, Leonard Maltin also notes that that scene received great praise in the animation world. However, he felt the film relied too much on "formula cuteness, formula comedy relief, and even formula characterizations". Overall, he considered it "charming" stating that it is "warm, and brimming with personable characters" and that it "approaches the old Disney magic at times." Craig Butler from All Movie Guide stated that it was a "warm and amusing, if slightly dull, entry in the Disney animated canon." He also called it "conventional and generally predictable" with problems in pacing. However, he praised its climax and animation, as well as the ending. His final remark is that "Two of the directors, Richard Rich and Ted Berman, would next direct The Black Cauldron, a less successful but more ambitious project."

Rob Humanick of Slant Magazine gave the film 3 1/2 out of five stars, noting that it was the transition point between the remaining original animators since Snow White and the Seven Dwarfs to the new generation, saying that "the results culled the best qualities of both groups." and that "The result is a work of both learned, assured poise and triumphant freshman determination, not far away (in style or quality) from other benchmark-status works, like the aforementioned Snow White or Pixar's Toy Story." RL Shaffer of IGN wrote a rather mixed review, claiming that it "is just not as impressive as Disney's early work, or their late '80s/early '90s pictures." James Kendrick of Q Network Film Desk stated that it "is not one of the studio's best efforts, but nonetheless it remains a fascinating product of an era of upheaval as well as a meaningful statement about the nature of prejudice." Peter Canavense of Groucho Reviews stated that it "is sweet but a bit dull", noting that "Overall, the picture is good-hearted and colorful, with an ending that carries a nice touch of ambiguity about the tussle of nature and nurture." John J. Puccio of Movie Metropolis claimed that it "is very sweet and no doubt a delight for children, but I found it quite slow and tedious."

The review aggregator website Rotten Tomatoes reported that the film received a 75% approval rating with an average rating of 6.5/10 based on 28 reviews. The website's consensus states that "The Fox and the Hound is a likeable, charming, unassuming effort that manages to transcend its thin, predictable plot." Metacritic gave it a score of 65 based on 15 reviews, indicating "generally favorable reviews".

== Accolades ==
The film was awarded a Golden Screen Award (German: Goldene Leinwand) in 1982. In the same year, it was also nominated for a Young Artist Award and the Saturn Award for Best Fantasy Film.

Year	Ceremony	Award	Result
1982	9th Saturn Awards	Best Fantasy Film	Nominated
1982	1982 Golden Screen Awards		Won
1982	5th Youth in Film Awards	Best Motion Picture - Fantasy or Comedy - Family Enjoyment	Nominated

== Related media ==
=== Comic adaptations ===
As well as adaptations of the film itself, comic strips featuring the characters also appeared in stories unconnected to it. Examples include The Lost Fawn, in which Copper uses his sense of smell to help Tod find a fawn who has gone astray; The Escape, in which Tod and Vixey must save a Canadian goose from a bobcat; The Chase, in which Copper must safeguard a sleepwalking Chief; and Feathered Friends, in which Dinky and Boomer must go to desperate lengths to save one of Widow Tweed's chickens from a coyote.

A comic adaptation of the film, drawn by Richard Moore, was published in newspapers as part of Disney's Treasury of Classic Tales. A comic-book titled The Fox and the Hound followed, with new adventures of the characters. From 1981 to 2007, a few Fox and the Hound Disney comics stories were produced in Italy, Netherlands, Brazil, France, and the United States.

=== Sequel ===
An intermediate follow-up, The Fox and the Hound 2, was released directly-to-DVD on December 12, 2006. It takes place during Tod and Copper's youth, before the events of the later half of the first film. The storyline involves Copper being tempted to join a band of singing stray dogs called "The Singin' Strays", thus threatening his friendship with Tod. It was critically panned, with critics calling it a pale imitation of its predecessor.

=== Others ===
Amos Slade (voiced by Maurice LaMarche) appears as one of the villains present at The Simpsons 2024 short The Most Wonderful Time of the Year.

In 2025, the video game Disney Magic Kingdoms included a limited-time event based on The Fox and the Hound with a storyline serving as a continuation of the events of the film, with Tod, Copper, Big Mama, Widow Tweed and Amos Slade as playable characters to unlock, along with attractions based on scenarios of the film.

== See also ==
- Foxes in popular culture, films and literature
- The Belstone Fox, a 1973 British film with similar themes, based on David Rook's 1970 novel, The Ballad of the Belstone Fox

== Bibliography ==
- Beck, Jerry (2005). The Animated Movie Guide. Chicago Reader Press. ISBN 978-1-556-52591-9.
- Hulett, Steve (2014). Mouse In Transition: An Insider's Look at Disney Feature Animation. Theme Park Press. ISBN 978-1-941-50024-8.
- Koenig, David (1997). Mouse Under Glass: Secrets of Disney Animation & Theme Parks. Bonaventure Press. ISBN 978-0-964-06051-7.
- Sito, Tom (2006). Drawing the Line: The Untold Story of the Animation Unions from Bosko to Bart Simpson. University Press of Kentucky. ISBN 978-0-813-12407-0.
