= The Rescuers =

1977 American animated film

- Original theatrical release poster
- Directed by: Wolfgang Reitherman; John Lounsbery; Art Stevens
- Story by: Larry Clemmons; Ken Anderson; Vance Gerry; Ted Berman; Burny Mattinson; Frank Thomas; David Michener; Fred Lucky; Dick Sebast
- Based on: The Rescuers; Miss Bianca by Margery Sharp
- Produced by: Wolfgang Reitherman
- Starring: Bob Newhart; Eva Gabor; Geraldine Page; Joe Flynn
- Edited by: Jim Koford; James Melton
- Music by: Artie Butler
- Production company: Walt Disney Productions
- Distributed by: Buena Vista Distribution
- Release date: June 22, 1977
- Running time: 77 minutes
- Country: United States
- Language: English
- Budget: $7.5 million
- Box office: $169 million

The Rescuers is a 1977 American animated adventure film produced by Walt Disney Productions and released by Buena Vista Distribution. Bob Newhart and Eva Gabor respectively star as Bernard and Bianca, two mice who are members of the Rescue Aid Society, an international mouse organization dedicated to helping abduction victims around the world. Both must free a young orphan Penny (voiced by Michelle Stacy) from two treasure hunters (played by Geraldine Page and Joe Flynn), who intend to use her to help them obtain a giant diamond. The film is based on a series of books by Margery Sharp, including The Rescuers (1959) and Miss Bianca (1962).

An early version of The Rescuers entered development in 1962, but was shelved due to Walt Disney's dislike of its political overtones. During the 1970s, the film was revived as a project intended for the younger animators, with the oversight of the senior staff. Four years were spent on the film's production. The Rescuers was released on June 22, 1977, to positive critical reception and became a box office success, earning $48 million during its initial theatrical run. It has since grossed $169 million after two theatrical re-releases in 1983 and 1989. Due to the film's success, a sequel titled The Rescuers Down Under was released in 1990, which made this the first Disney theatrical animated film to have a sequel.

== Plot ==
In an abandoned riverboat in Devil's Bayou, Louisiana, a small orphan girl named Penny drops a message in a bottle, containing a plea for help, into the river. The Rescue Aid Society, an international mouse organization inside the United Nations, finds the bottle when it washes up in New York City. The Hungarian representative, Miss Bianca, volunteers to accept the case. She chooses Bernard, a stammering janitor, as her co-agent.

The two mice visit Morningside Orphanage, where Penny lived, and meet an old cat named Rufus. He tells them about a woman named Madame Medusa who once tried to lure Penny into her car, prompting the mice to investigate Medusa's pawn shop for clues.

At the pawn shop, Bianca and Bernard discover that Medusa and her partner, Mr. Snoops, are searching for the world's largest diamond, the Devil's Eye. Snoops is currently at the Devil's Bayou with Penny, whom the pair have kidnapped and placed under the guard of two trained crocodiles, Brutus and Nero. With the help of an albatross named Orville and a dragonfly named Evinrude, the mice follow Medusa to the bayou. There, they learn that Medusa plans to force Penny to enter a small blowhole that leads down into a blocked-off pirates' cave, where the Devil's Eye is located.

Bernard and Bianca find Penny and devise a plan of escape. They send Evinrude to alert the local animals, who loathe Medusa, but Evinrude is delayed when he is forced to take shelter from a cloud of bats. The following morning, Medusa and Snoops send Penny down into the cave to find the gem. Unbeknownst to Medusa, Bianca and Bernard are hiding in Penny's dress pocket. The three soon find the Devil's Eye within a pirate skull. As Penny pries the mouth open with a sword, the mice push the gem through it. The oceanic tide rises, flooding the cave; Penny and the mice only barely manage to escape.

Medusa betrays Snoops and hides the diamond in Penny's teddy bear, while holding Penny and Snoops at gunpoint. Bernard and Bianca use a cable to trip Medusa, who drops the bear; Penny snatches it up and runs. The local animals arrive at the riverboat, help Bernard and Bianca to trap Brutus and Nero, then set off Mr. Snoops's fireworks to create a diversion. Meanwhile, Penny and the mice commandeer Medusa's swamp-mobile, a makeshift airboat. Medusa unsuccessfully pursues them, using Brutus and Nero as water-skis. As the riverboat sinks from the fireworks' damage, Medusa crashes and is left clinging to the boat's smoke stacks. Mr. Snoops escapes on a raft and laughs at her, while the irritated Brutus and Nero turn on her and circle below.

Back in New York City, the Rescue Aid Society watch a news report of how Penny found the Devil's Eye, which has been given to the Smithsonian Institution while it is implied that Medusa and Mr. Snoops have been arrested. The report also mentions that Penny has been adopted. The meeting is interrupted when Evinrude arrives with a call for help, sending Bernard and Bianca on a new adventure.

== Cast ==
- Bob Newhart as Bernard, Rescue Aid Society's timid janitor, who reluctantly tags along with Miss Bianca on her journey to the Devil's Bayou to rescue Penny. He is highly superstitious about the number 13 and dislikes flying (the latter being a personality trait of Newhart).
- Eva Gabor as Miss Bianca, the Hungarian representative of the Rescue Aid Society. She is sophisticated and adventurous, and fond of Bernard, choosing him as her co-agent as she sets out to rescue Penny. Her Hungarian nationality was derived from that of her voice actress.
- Geraldine Page as Madame Medusa, a greedy, redheaded, wicked pawn-shop owner. Upon discovering the Devil's Eye diamond hidden in a blowhole, she kidnaps the small orphan, Penny, to retrieve it for her, as Penny is the only one small enough to fit in it. She has two pet crocodiles, who turn on her after she is thwarted by Bernard, Bianca, and Penny.
- Joe Flynn as Mr. Snoops, Medusa's clumsy and incompetent business partner, who obeys his boss's orders to steal the Devil's Eye in exchange for half of it. Upon being betrayed by Medusa, however, he turns on her and flees by raft, laughing at her. This was Flynn's final role, with the film being released after his death in 1974.
- Jeanette Nolan as Ellie Mae and Pat Buttram as Luke, two muskrats who reside in a Southern-style home on a patch of land in Devil's Bayou. Luke drinks very strong, homemade liquor, which is used to help Bernard and Evinrude regain energy when they need it. Its most important usage is for fuel for powering Medusa's swamp-mobile in the film's climax.
- Jim Jordan as Orville (named after Orville Wright of the Wright brothers, the inventors of the airplane; most likely influenced from Bob Newhart's stand-up sketch "Merchandising the Wright Brothers"), an albatross who gives Bernard and Bianca a ride to Devil's Bayou. Jordan, 80 years old by the time the film was completed, had been lured out of retirement and had not performed since the death of his wife and comic partner Marian in 1961; it would serve as Jordan's last public performance.
- John McIntire as Rufus, an elderly cat who resides at Morningside Orphanage and comforts Penny when she is sad. Although his time onscreen is rather brief, he provides the film's most important theme, faith. He was designed by animator Ollie Johnston, who retired after the film following a 40-year career with Disney.
- Michelle Stacy as Penny, a lonely orphan girl residing at Morningside Orphanage in New York City. She is kidnapped by Medusa in an attempt to retrieve the world's largest diamond, the Devil's Eye.
- Bernard Fox as Mr. Chairman, the chairman to the Rescue Aid Society.
- Larry Clemmons as Gramps, a grumpy, yet kind old turtle who carries a brown cane.
- James MacDonald as Evinrude (named after a brand of outboard motors), a dragonfly who mans a leaf boat across Devil's Bayou, giving Bernard and Miss Bianca a ride across the swamp waters.
- George Lindsey as Deadeye, a fisher rabbit who is one of Luke and Ellie Mae's friends.
- Bill McMillian as TV Announcer
- Dub Taylor as Digger, a mole.
- John Fiedler as Deacon Owl

== Production ==
In 1959, the book The Rescuers by Margery Sharp had been published to considerable success. In 1962, Sharp followed up with a sequel titled Miss Bianca. That same year, the books were optioned by Walt Disney, who began developing an animated film adaptation. In January 1963, story artist Otto Englander wrote a story treatment based on the first book, centering on a Norwegian poet unfairly imprisoned in a Siberia-like stronghold known as the Black Castle. The story was revised with the location changed to Cuba, in which the mice would help the poet escape into the United States. However, as the story became overtly involved in international intrigue, Disney shelved the project as he was unhappy with the political overtones. In August 1968, Englander wrote another treatment featuring Bernard and Bianca rescuing Richard the Lionheart during the Middle Ages.

During the early 1970s, The Rescuers reentered development as a project for the young animators, led by Don Bluth, with the studio planning to alternate between full-scale "A pictures" and smaller, scaled-back "B pictures" with simpler animation. The animators had selected the most recent book, Miss Bianca in the Antarctic, to adapt from. The new story involved a King penguin deceiving a captured polar bear into performing in shows aboard a schooner, causing the unsatisfied bear to place a bottle that would reach the mice. Fred Lucky, a newly hired storyboard artist, was assigned to develop the story adaptation, alongside Ken Anderson. This version of the story was dropped, to which Lucky explained the Arctic setting "was too stark a background for the animators." Vance Gerry, also a storyboard artist, also explained director Wolfgang Reitherman "decided not to go with Fred Lucky's version. He said, "'It's too complicated. I want a simple story: A little girl gets kidnapped and the mice try to get her back, period.'" According to Burny Mattinson, he stated: "Our problem was that the penguin wasn't formidable or evil enough for the audience to believe he would dominate the big bear. We struggled with that for a year or so. We changed the locale to somewhere in America and it was now a regular zoo and we tried to come up with something with the bear in the zoo and needing to be rescued but that didn't work either."

In that version, the bear character was still retained, but was renamed Louie the Bear. Jazz singer Louis Prima was cast in the role and had recorded most of the dialogue and multiple songs that were composed by Floyd Huddleston. The writers also expanded the role of his best friend, Gus the Lion. Huddleston had stated, "It's about two animals. One is Louis Prima — he's the polar bear — and Redd Foxx is the lion ...Louis gets cornered into leaving and going to the South Pole where he can make himself a bigger star. But he gets homesick; he feels fooled. They send out little mice as 'rescuers'." By November 1973, the role of Louie the Bear had been heavily scaled back and then eliminated. In one version, the bear was meant to be Bernard and Bianca's connection to Penny. Gerry explained, "We developed the sequence where, while the two mice are searching for clues as to where Penny has been taken, they come across this bear who she had been friends with because the orphanage where Penny was living was near the zoo." In the final film, the idea was reduced to a simple scene where Bernard enters a zoo and hears a lion's roar that scares him away.

Penny struggles to free the Devil's Eye diamond from a pirate's skull; the filmmakers carefully designed every shot of the scene to raise the tension.

While promoting the release of Robin Hood (1973) in Europe, Reitherman stated: "I took Margery Sharp's books along and there was in there a mean woman in a crystal palace. When I got back I called some of the guys together and I said, 'We've got to get a villain in this thing.'" The villainess and her motive to steal a diamond was adapted from the Diamond Duchess in Miss Bianca. The setting was then changed to the bayous found in the Southern United States. By August 1973, the villainess was named the Grand Duchess with Phyllis Diller cast in the role. A month later, Ken Anderson began depicting Cruella de Vil, the villainess from One Hundred and One Dalmatians (1961), as the main antagonist of the film. Anderson had drawn several sketches of Cruella de Vil sporting alligator-leathered chic attire and sunglasses; one sketch depicted her wearing bell-bottom pants and platform shoes. However, several staff members such as animator Ollie Johnston stated it felt wrong to attempt a sequel for the character. Furthermore, Mattinson explained that Milt Kahl did not want to animate Cruella de Vil. "Milt, of course, was very strong against that, 'Oh, no no. We're gonna have a new character. I'm not gonna do Cruella'," Mattinson recalled, "Because he felt that Marc [Davis] had animated Cruella beautifully. He was not gonna go and take his character."

The new villain was named Madame Medusa, and her appearance was based on Kahl's then-wife, Phyllis Bounds (who was the niece of Lillian Disney), whom he divorced in 1978. This was Kahl's last film for the studio, and he wanted his final character to be his best. He was so insistent on perfecting Madame Medusa that he ended up doing almost all the animation for the character himself. The kidnapped child Penny was inspired by Patience, the orphan in the novel. The alligator characters Brutus and Nero was based on the two bloodhounds, Tyrant and Torment, in the novels. For the henchman, the filmmakers adapted the character, Mandrake, into Mr. Snoops. His appearance was caricatured from John Culhane, a journalist, who had been interviewing animators at the Disney studios. Culhane claimed he was practically tricked into posing for various reactions, and his movements were imitated on Mr. Snoops's model sheet. However, he stated, "Becoming a Disney character was beyond my wildest dreams of glory."

The writers had considered depicting Bernard and Bianca as married professional detectives, but decided that depicting them as novices in a new relationship was more compelling and romantic. For the supporting characters, a pint-sized swamp mobile for the mice—a leaf powered by a dragonfly—was created. As they developed the comedic potential of displaying his exhaustion through buzzing, the dragonfly grew from an incidental into a major character. Veteran sound effects artist and voice actor Jimmy MacDonald came out of retirement to provide the effects.

Additionally, the local swamp creatures were originally written as a dedicated home guard that drilled and marched incessantly. However, the writers rewrote them into a volunteer group of helpful little bayou creatures. Their leader, a singing bullfrog, voiced by Phil Harris, was cut from the film, as were lines characterizing muskrat Ellie Mae as their outspoken boss. For Bernard and Bianca's transportation, a pigeon was proposed (specifically one that would be catapulted, repurposing an unused gag from Robin Hood), until Johnston remembered a True-Life Adventures film featuring albatrosses and their clumsy take-offs and landings, leading him suggest that ungainly bird instead. A scene of the mice preparing for their adventure, with Bianca choosing outfits and Bernard testing James Bond-like gadgets, was cut for pacing. On February 13, 1976, co-director John Lounsbery died of a heart attack during production. Art Stevens, an animator, was then selected as the new co-director.

=== Animation ===
After the commercial success of The Aristocats (1970), then-vice president Ron Miller pledged that new animators should be hired to ensure "a continuity of quality Disney animated films for another generation." Eric Larson, one of the "Nine Old Men" animators, scouted for potential artists who were studying at art schools and colleges throughout the United States. More than 60 artists were brought into the training program. Then, the selected trainees were to create a black-and-white animation test, which were reviewed at the end of the month. The process would continue for several months, in which the few finalists were first employed as in-betweeners working only on nights and weekends. By 1977, more than 25 artists were hired during the training program. Among those selected were Glen Keane, Ron Clements, and Andy Gaskill, all of whom would play crucial roles in the Disney Renaissance. Because of this, The Rescuers was the first collaboration between the newly recruited trainees and the senior animators. It would also mark the last joint effort by Milt Kahl, Ollie Johnston, and Frank Thomas, and the first Disney film Don Bluth had worked on as a directing animator, instead of as an assistant animator.

Ever since One Hundred and One Dalmatians (1961), animation for theatrical Disney animated films had been done by xerography, which had only been able to produce black outlines. By the time The Rescuers was in production, the technology had been improved for the cel artists to use a medium-grey toner in order to create a softer-looking line.

== Music ==
The Rescuers

Soundtrack album Vinyl LP by Various artists
- Released: 1977
- Recorded: 1974–1977
- Label: Disneyland
- Producer: Artie Butler

Sammy Fain was first hired as a lyricist and wrote two original songs "Swamp Volunteers March" and "The Rescuers Aid Society". Meanwhile, the filmmakers had listened to an unproduced musical composed by the songwriting team of Carol Connors and Ayn Robbins. Both women had first met each other in 1973 on a double date. Before then, Connors had co-composed and sang successful songs such as "To Know Him Is to Love Him" and "Hey Little Cobra" with the Teddy Bears. Meanwhile, Robbins worked as a personal secretary to actors George Kennedy and Eva Gabor and wrote unpublished poetry.

Desiring more contemporary songs for the film, Reitherman called Connors and Robbins into his office and shown them storyboards of Bernard and Bianca flying on Orville. Connors and Robbins then composed "Tomorrow Is Another Day" to accompany the scene. They later composed the symphonic piece "The Journey" to play during the opening titles. Near the end of the film's production, Reitherman asked artist Mel Shaw to illustrate pastel sketches to accompany the music. Shaw agreed and was assisted by Burny Mattinson.

Connors and Robbins wrote another song "The Need To Be Loved", but Reitherman preferred Fain's song "Someone's Waiting for You". He nevertheless asked both women to compose new lyrics for the songs. They also recomposed a new version of the "Rescuers Aid Society" song. Most of the songs they had written for the film were performed by Shelby Flint. Also, for the first time since Bambi (1942), all the most prominent songs were sung as part of a narrative, as opposed to by the film's characters as in most Disney animated films.

Describing their collaborative process, Robbins noted "...Carol plays the piano and I play the pencil." During production, both women were nominated for an Academy Award for Best Original Song for "Gonna Fly Now" from Rocky (1976) with Bill Conti.

=== Songs ===
Original songs performed in the film include:

No.	Title	Performer(s)	Length
1.	"The Journey"	Shelby Flint
2.	"Rescue Aid Society"	Robie Lester, Bob Newhart, Bernard Fox & the Disney Studio Chorus
3.	"Tomorrow is Another Day"	Shelby Flint
4.	"Someone's Waiting for You"	Shelby Flint
5.	"Tomorrow is Another Day (Reprise)"	Shelby Flint

Songs heard in the film but not released on the soundtrack include:

- "Faith is a Bluebird" – Although not an actual song, it is a poem recited by Rufus and partially by Penny in a flashback the old cat has to when he last saw the small orphan girl, and comforted her through the poem, about having faith. The titular bluebird that appears in this sequence originally appeared in Alice in Wonderland (1951).
- "The U.S. Air Force" – Serves as the leitmotif for Orville.
- "For Penny's a Jolly Good Fellow" – Sung by the orphan children at the end of the film, as a variation of the song "For He's a Jolly Good Fellow".

== Release ==
=== Original theatrical run ===
On June 19, 1977, The Rescuers premiered at the AFI Silver Theatre in Washington, D.C., and was accompanied with the live-action nature documentary film, A Tale of Two Critters (1977). By January 1979, the film had earned $15 million in distributor rentals from the United States and Canada, achieving the highest-gross for an animated film during its initial release.

The film was the highest-grossing film in France in 1977, out-grossing Star Wars and The Spy Who Loved Me. It received admissions of 7.2 million in France, generating nearly $6 million in box office rentals. The film also became the highest-grossing film in West Germany for 1977, earning $6 million during its first 20 days of release. Altogether, it received admissions of 10.3 million in Germany, generating rentals of almost $12 million. During its release, it earned $48–50 million in worldwide gross rentals at the box office.

=== Re-releases ===
The Rescuers was re-released in 1983 and 1989. During its 1983 re-release, the film was accompanied with the new Mickey Mouse featurette, Mickey's Christmas Carol, which marked the character's first theatrical appearance after a 30-year absence. The film grossed $21 million domestically. In 1989, the film earned $21.2 million domestically. The film's total lifetime domestic gross is $71.2 million, and its total lifetime worldwide gross is $169 million.

=== Marketing ===
To tie in with the film's 25th anniversary, The Rescuers debuted in the Walt Disney Classics Collection line in 2002, with three different figures featuring three of the film's characters, as well as the opening title scroll. The three figures were sculpted by Dusty Horner and they were: Brave Bianca, featuring Miss Bianca the heroine and priced at $75, Bold Bernard, featuring hero Bernard, priced also at $75 and Evinrude Base, featuring Evinrude the dragonfly and priced at $85. The title scroll featuring the film's name, The Rescuers, and from the opening song sequence, "The Journey," was priced at $30. All figures were retired in March 2005, except for the opening title scroll which was suspended in December 2012.

The Rescuers was the inspiration for another Walt Disney Classics Collection figure in 2003. Ken Melton was the sculptor of Teddy Goes With Me, My Dear, a limited-edition, 8-inch sculpture featuring the evil Madame Medusa, the orphan girl Penny, her teddy bear "Teddy" and the Devil's Eye diamond. Exactly 1,977 of these sculptures were made, in reference to the film's release year, 1977. The sculpture was priced at $299 and instantly declared retired in 2003.

In November 2008, a sixth sculpture inspired by the film was released. Made with pewter and resin, Cleared For Take Off introduced the character of Orville into the collection and featured Bernard and Bianca a second time. The piece, inspired by Orville's take-off scene in the film, was sculpted by Ruben Procopio.

=== Home media ===
The Rescuers premiered on VHS and LaserDisc on September 18, 1992, as part of the Walt Disney Classics series. The release went into moratorium on April 30, 1993. It was re-released on VHS as part of the Walt Disney Masterpiece Collection on January 5, 1999, but due to a scandal was recalled three days later and reissued on March 23, 1999.

The Rescuers was released on DVD on May 20, 2003, as a standard edition, which was discontinued in November 2011.

On August 21, 2012, a 35th-anniversary edition of The Rescuers was released on Blu-ray alongside its sequel in a "2-Movie Collection".

On June 14, 2022, The Rescuers and its sequel were re-released on Blu-ray in a "2-Movie Collection."

==== Nudity scandal ====
One of the frames containing a picture of a topless woman in the window

On January 8, 1999, three days after the film's second release on home video, The Walt Disney Company announced a recall of about 3.4 million copies of the videotapes because there was a blurry image of a topless woman in the background of a scene.

The image appears twice in non-consecutive frames during the scene in which Miss Bianca and Bernard are flying on Orville's back through New York City. The two images could not be seen in ordinary viewing because the film runs too fast—at 24 frames per second.

On January 10, 1999, two days after the recall was announced, the London newspaper The Independent reported:

A Disney spokeswoman said that the images in The Rescuers were placed in the film during post-production, but she declined to say what they were or who placed them... The company said the aim of the recall was to keep its promise to families that they can trust and rely on the Disney brand to provide the best in family entertainment.

The Rescuers home video would quickly be reissued with the nudity edited and blocked out.

== Reception ==
The Rescuers was said to be Disney's greatest film since Mary Poppins (1964), and seemed to signal a new golden age for Disney animation. Charles Champlin of the Los Angeles Times praised the film as "the best feature-length animated film from Disney in a decade or more—the funniest, the most inventive, the least self-conscious, the most coherent, and moving from start to finish, and probably most important of all, it is also the most touching in that unique way fantasy has of carrying vibrations of real life and real feelings." Gary Arnold of The Washington Post wrote the film "is one of the most rousing and appealing animated features ever made by the Disney studio. The last production for several members of the original feature animation unit assembled by Walt Disney in the late '30s, the film is both a triumphant swan song and gladdening act of regeneration." Dave Kehr of The Chicago Reader praised the film as "a beautifully crafted and wonderfully expressive cartoon feature," calling it "genuinely funny and touching." Variety magazine wrote the film was "the best work by Disney animators in many years, restoring the craft to its former glories. In addition, it has a more adventurous approach to color and background stylization than previous Disney efforts have displayed, with a delicate pastel palette used to wide-ranging effect."

Vincent Canby of The New York Times wrote that the film "doesn't belong in the same category as the great Disney cartoon features (Snow White and The Seven Dwarfs, Bambi, Fantasia) but it's a reminder of a kind of slickly cheerful, animated entertainment that has become all but extinct." Gene Siskel of the Chicago Tribune gave the film two-and-a-half stars out of four writing, "To see any Disney animated film these days is to compare it with Disney classics released 30 or 40 years ago. Judged against Pinocchio, for example. The Rescuers is lightweight, indeed. Its themes are forgettable. It's mostly an adventure story." TV Guide gave the film three stars out of five, opining that The Rescuers "is a beautifully animated film that showed Disney still knew a lot about making quality children's fare even as their track record was weakening." They also praised the voice acting of the characters, and stated that the film is "a delight for children as well as adults who appreciate good animation and brisk storytelling." Ellen MacKay of Common Sense Media gave the film four out of five stars, writing, "Great adventure, but too dark for preschoolers".

In his book The Disney Films, film historian Leonard Maltin referred to The Rescuers as "a breath of fresh air for everyone who had been concerned about the future of animation at Walt Disney's" and considered it their "the most satisfying animated feature to come from the studio since 101 Dalmatians." He further praised the film's "humor and imagination and [that it is] expertly woven into a solid story structure ... with a delightful cast of characters." The film's own animators Frank Thomas and Ollie Johnston stated on their website that The Rescuers was their best film without Walt Disney. The review aggregator website Rotten Tomatoes reported that the film received a 79% approval rating, with an average rating of 6.5/10 based on 33 reviews. The website's consensus states: "Featuring superlative animation, off-kilter characters, and affectionate voice work by Bob Newhart and Eva Gabor, The Rescuers represents a bright spot in Disney's post-golden age." On Metacritic, the film has a weighted average score of 74 out of 100 based on 8 reviews, indicating "generally favorable reviews".

=== Accolades ===
Award	Category	Nominee(s)	Result	Ref.
Academy Awards	Best Original Song	"Someone's Waiting for You"; Music by Sammy Fain; Lyrics by Carol Connors and Ayn Robbins	Nominated	
National Board of Review Awards	Special Citation		Won	

In 2008, the American Film Institute nominated The Rescuers for its Top 10 Animated Films list.

== Legacy ==
Bernard and Bianca made appearances as meet-and-greet characters at Walt Disney World and Disneyland in the years following the original film's release. While they currently do not make regular appearances at the American parks, both continue to appear regularly at Tokyo Disney Resort.

Like other Disney animated characters, the characters of the film have recurring cameo appearances in the television series House of Mouse.

In the Disney Infinity video games, Medusa's Swamp Mobile was introduced as a vehicle in Disney Infinity 2.0.

In the world builder video game Disney Magic Kingdoms, Bernard, Miss Bianca, Penny, Madame Medusa, and Orville appear as playable characters in the main storyline of the game, along with The Rescue Aid Society and Madame Medusa's Riverboat as attractions.

Along with other Walt Disney Animation Studios characters, the main characters of the film have cameo appearances in the short film Once Upon a Studio.

=== Related media ===
==== Comics ====
- Gold Key published an adaptation of the film under its Disney Comics Showcase banner
- Two Comic strips adaptations were also published

==== Sequel ====
The Rescuers was the first Disney animated film to have a sequel. After three successful theatrical releases of the original film, The Rescuers Down Under was released theatrically on November 16, 1990.

The Rescuers Down Under takes place in the Australian Outback, and involves Bernard and Bianca trying to rescue a boy named Cody and a giant golden eagle called Marahute from a greedy poacher named Percival C. McLeach. Both Bob Newhart and Eva Gabor reprised their lead roles. Since Jim Jordan, who had voiced Orville, had since died, a new character, Wilbur (Orville's brother, another albatross), was created and voiced by John Candy.

==== Scrapped television series ====
In 2022, Rapunzel's Tangled Adventure, Monsters At Work and Wish alumnus Tom Caulfield revealed that he alongside The Ghost and Molly McGee creators Bill Motz and Bob Roth had pitched a crossover series between The Rescuers and The Great Mouse Detective at Disney Television Animation. The series would have featured the descendant of Basil working at a modernized version of the Rescue Aid Society, more akin to The Kingsman or Mission: Impossible led by Bianca. According to Caulfield, the project was scrapped due to the 2022 film Chip 'n Dale: Rescue Rangers.

== See also ==
- 1977 in film
- List of American films of 1977
- List of animated feature films of 1977
- List of highest-grossing animated films
- List of highest-grossing films in France
- List of Walt Disney Pictures films
- List of Disney theatrical animated feature films
