= Roy, Montana =

- Census-Designated Place
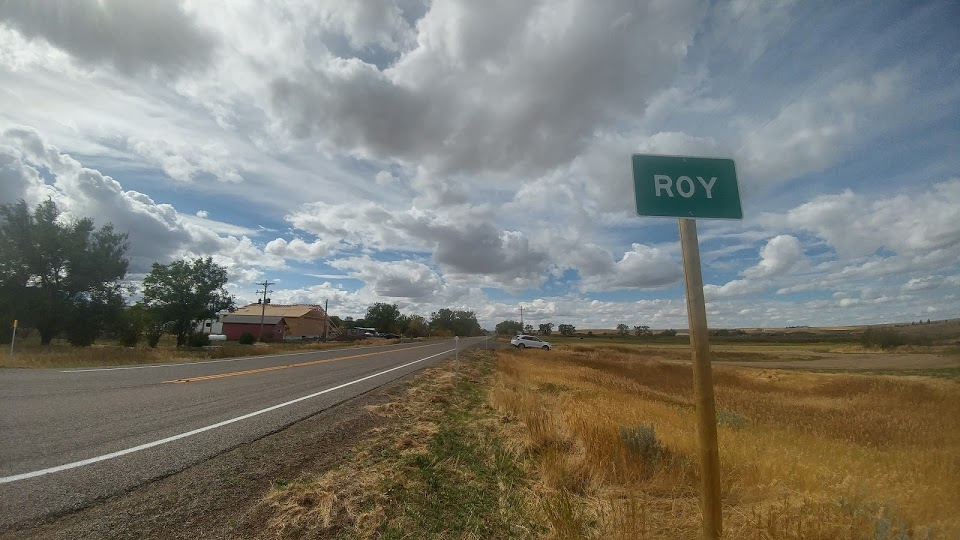
- Interactive map of Roy, Montana
- Coordinates: 47°20′03″N 108°57′36″W
- Country: United States
- State: Montana
- County: Fergus

Area
  - Total: 3.41 sq mi (8.82 km^{2})
  - Land: 3.41 sq mi (8.82 km^{2})
  - Water: 0 sq mi (0.00 km^{2})
- Elevation: 3,491 ft (1,064 m)

Population (2020)
  - Total: 96
  - Density: 28.2/sq mi (10.89/km^{2})
- FIPS code: 30-64675
- GNIS feature ID: 2583841

Roy is a census-designated place (CDP) in Fergus County, Montana, United States. As of the 2020 census, Roy had a population of 96.

== Description ==
The community is located along U.S. Route 191 in northeastern Fergus County, 35 miles (56 km) northeast of Lewistown. Roy has a post office with the ZIP code 59471. As of the census of 2010, there were 108 people.

The post office opened in 1892. The Milwaukee Land Company platted the townsite in 1913.

== Climate ==
Roy has a semi-arid climate (Köppen BSk) with cold winters except when moderated by chinook influences that will typically push maximum temperatures over 50 °F or 10 °C on seventeen days during winter and twelve days each in November and March. Spring is mild and frequently thundery, whilst summer days are hot – sometimes very hot – but nights are usually pleasantly cool.

Precipitation is fairly scarce, mostly coming from thunderstorms during late spring and summer, whilst snowfall averages 43 inches or 1.09 metres (the median is 30.9 inches or 0.78 metres) but significant falls occur on only a minority of winter days. However, during the cold winter of 1977–78, cover reached 56 inches or 1.42 metres on February 19 and averaged 46 inches or 1.17 metres for the whole month of February.

Climate data for Roy 8 NE, Montana (1971–2000; extremes 1948−2001)
Month	Jan	Feb	Mar	Apr	May	Jun	Jul	Aug	Sep	Oct	Nov	Dec	Year
Record high °F (°C)	69 (21)	72 (22)	78 (26)	90 (32)	96 (36)	103 (39)	105 (41)	107 (42)	103 (39)	92 (33)	78 (26)	69 (21)	107 (42)
Mean daily maximum °F (°C)	31.7 (−0.2)	37.8 (3.2)	46.5 (8.1)	57.6 (14.2)	67.5 (19.7)	76.9 (24.9)	84.6 (29.2)	84.6 (29.2)	72.9 (22.7)	61.1 (16.2)	43.7 (6.5)	34.3 (1.3)	58.3 (14.6)
Mean daily minimum °F (°C)	7.7 (−13.5)	13.1 (−10.5)	21.9 (−5.6)	31.0 (−0.6)	40.3 (4.6)	48.4 (9.1)	53.0 (11.7)	52.0 (11.1)	42.0 (5.6)	32.1 (0.1)	19.6 (−6.9)	10.4 (−12.0)	31.0 (−0.6)
Record low °F (°C)	−41 (−41)	−39 (−39)	−33 (−36)	−5 (−21)	10 (−12)	29 (−2)	36 (2)	30 (−1)	16 (−9)	−11 (−24)	−29 (−34)	−41 (−41)	−41 (−41)
Average precipitation inches (mm)	0.50 (13)	0.31 (7.9)	0.81 (21)	1.14 (29)	2.73 (69)	2.30 (58)	1.97 (50)	1.53 (39)	1.22 (31)	0.73 (19)	0.44 (11)	0.50 (13)	14.18 (360.9)
Average snowfall inches (cm)	8.1 (21)	5.4 (14)	8.1 (21)	4.3 (11)	0.9 (2.3)	0.0 (0.0)	0.0 (0.0)	0.0 (0.0)	0.2 (0.51)	2.3 (5.8)	5.6 (14)	8.1 (21)	43 (110.61)
Average precipitation days (≥ 0.01 in)	4.7	3.6	6.1	6.2	9.9	9.9	7.3	6.8	6.1	4.4	4.4	4.7	74.1
Average snowy days (≥ 0.1 in)	3.9	2.6	3.5	1.4	0.4	0.0	0.0	0.0	0.1	0.7	2.7	3.7	19
Source: NOAA

== Demographics ==
Historical population
Census	Pop.	Note	%±
2020	96		—
U.S. Decennial Census

== Education ==
Roy Public Schools educates students from kindergarten through 12th grade. Roy High School's team name is the Pirates.

== See also ==
- List of census-designated places in Montana
