= Mars and Beyond =

- Disneyland episode
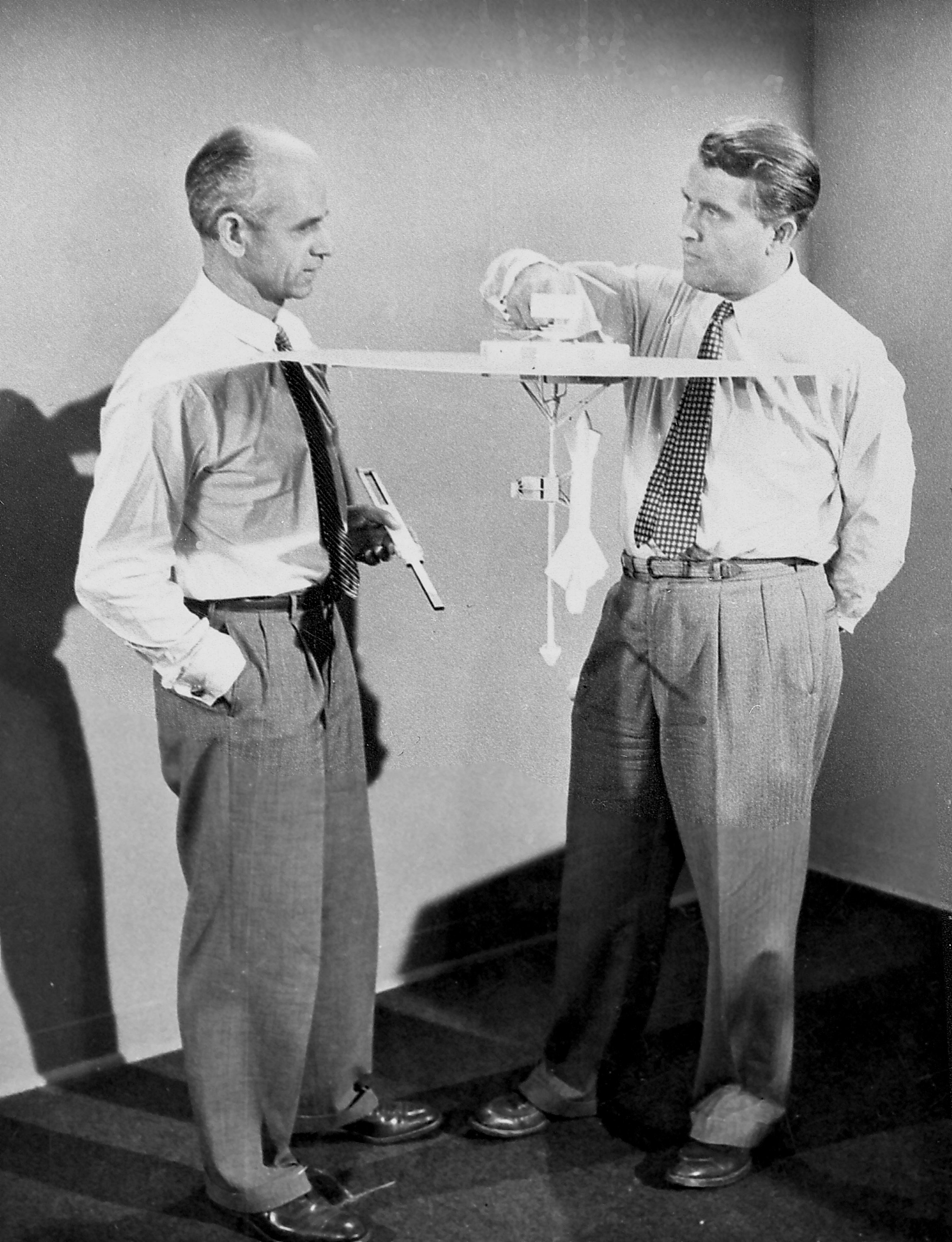
- In this photo, taken at the Walt Disney Studios in California, Dr. Wernher von Braun and Dr. Ernst Stuhlinger are shown discussing the concepts of nuclear-electric spaceships designed to undertake the mission to the planet Mars.
- Episode no.: Season 4 Episode 12
- Directed by: Ward Kimball
- Editing by: Lionel A. Ephraim, Lloyd Richardson
- Original air date: December 4, 1957

Guest appearances
- Dr. Wernher von Braun and Dr. Ernst Stuhlinger

"Mars and Beyond" is an episode of Disneyland which aired on December 4, 1957. It was directed by Ward Kimball and narrated by Paul Frees. This episode discusses the possibility of life on other planets, especially Mars. The show was also released in theaters in 1957.

== Plot ==
The film begins with an introduction by Walt Disney and his robot friend Garco, providing a brief overview of the episode. The overview starts with an animated presentation about mankind seeking to understand the world in which he lives, first noticing patterns in the stars, and developing certain beliefs regarding the celestial bodies. Theories from scientists and philosophers are discussed, including Ptolemy's inaccurate, but formerly-accepted geocentrism-related theories, as well as those of Copernicus's accurate and, now, confirmed heliocentric model. Life on other planets is considered, soon focusing on Mars. Ideas from science-fiction authors H. G. Wells and Edgar Rice Burroughs are brought to life with more colorful animation, and, as done before, science fiction comics of the time are parodied. This segment also features Kimball's comic tone and a cameo appearance by Donald Duck.

Later on, the program adopts a serious tone as it profiles each of the planets in the Solar System, explaining what would happen if a human were to live on each of them. The program claims that, whereas most of the planets are either too cold or too hot for life as we know it, life on Mars could almost be normal. This importance becomes the main focus of the rest of the film. Dr. E.C. Slipher then discusses the possibility of life currently on Mars. An extended sequence speculates at what the conditions on Mars might be like given sufficient water: cannibalistic plants, a trilobite-like creature which eats the dust left behind by dust storms, silicon-based lifeforms which rely solely on minerals for nutrition, leaving behind amazing and strange if ephemeral formations, and a slew of predators, including one that has radial symmetry and magnifies the Sun's rays to burn its hapless prey, and another which stuns with ultrasonics.

The program wraps up with what a trip to Mars would entail for a space crew and its vessels. Contributor/spacecraft designer Ernst Stuhlinger (accompanied by Wernher von Braun) presents his design and details regarding a unique umbrella-shaped Mars Ship: The top portion would be a revolving outer quarters ring providing artificial gravity for the crew of 20 under 'parasol' coolant tubes. At the other end, a sodium-potassium reactor would provide power to the midsection electric/ion drive. Attached upright would be a chemically fueled winged tail-lander. The mission shown involves six Mars Ships with top speeds up to 100,000 miles per hour (160,000 km/h) that take a 400-day spiral course to Mars. There, a crew would spend 412 days on the surface before returning to Earth.

== Additional releases ==
An educational film titled Cosmic Capers was edited out of this episode in 1979. It was shorter than the original and ran 18 minutes.

In 2003, with the cooperation of Disney, a 35mm five-minute excerpt from Mars and Beyond was restored and presented in Don Hertzfeldt's Animation Show theatrical tour.

Two clips from the episode are shown as part of a movie loop at the Sci-Fi Dine-In Theater Restaurant at Disney's Hollywood Studios, with the clips being the introduction with Garco and the science fiction parody.

== Home media ==
The episode was released on May 18, 2004, on Walt Disney Treasures: Tomorrow Land.

It was included in HD as a Special Feature on Disney's Roving Mars (2006) Blu-ray, released on July 31, 2007.

It was added to Disney+ in June 2020.

== See also ==
- "Man Will Conquer Space Soon!"
