= How to Play Football =

- Directed by: Jack Kinney
- Story by: Harry Reeves; Rex Cox
- Produced by: Walt Disney
- Starring: Jack Kinney; John Sibley
- Narrated by: Frank Bull
- Music by: Oliver Wallace
- Animation by: George Nicholas; Norman Tate; Marvin Woodward; Andy Engman
- Color process: Technicolor
- Production company: Walt Disney Productions
- Distributed by: RKO Radio Pictures
- Release date: September 15, 1944 (USA)
- Running time: 7 min (one reel)
- Language: English

How to Play Football is an animated comedy short film by Disney starring Goofy, released on September 15, 1944. The short was directed by Jack Kinney. The seven and a half minute film was nominated for an Academy Award for Best Animated Short Film, but lost to the Tom and Jerry cartoon Mouse Trouble by MGM.

== Production ==
The short was animated by George Nicholas, Norman Tate, Marvin Woodward, and Andy Engman. The story was by Harry Reeves and Rex Cox, while the music was by Oliver Wallace.

The surnames of the football players were based upon the short's creative team.

== Plot ==
The plot concerns The Goofies of Taxidermy Tech versus the Goofies of Anthropology A&M in a football match. Like many of the shorts which featured Goofy, this film was a mockumentary: "[a] college covered with ivy, a colosseum or stadium filled to overflowing with a hundred thousand rabid, wildly cheering fans, great armies of vendors, managers, mascots, sportswriters, photographers, doctors, a brass band, assorted coaches, old grads, scores of Annie Oakleys, and two teams in uniform" required to play football are shown, the rules of the game are summarized as each time trying to get the football over the opposing goal line, with eleven players to each side, but are drowned out by the cheering crowd.

Anthropology A&M opens the game kicking off to Taxidermy Tech, with Tech's star player 'Swivel Hips' Smith fielding it deep in his own endzone. Smith quickly scampers for a 105-yard kickoff return touchdown. Smith is benched by Tech's head coach, who wants to save Smith from potential injury by only utilizing him on particularly important plays. Tech's extra point is good, putting the score at 7–0. Tech kicks off to A&M, but A&M fumbles around their own 21 yard line and the ball is recovered by Tech. After huddling, Tech runs a successful handoff to their fullback for a gain of eight yards. However, a second down handoff to the halfback results in a nine-yard loss, with Tech's quarterback getting injured on the play. Facing a key third down with eleven yards to go, Tech calls a running play with multiple handoffs involved before one of their players puts the ball inside his jersey. Feigning as if nobody knows who has it, soon all eleven players on both teams are frantically running around the line of scrimmage before a Tech player unexpectedly finds himself in possession of another handoff. Before he can run, he is quickly tackled by several A&M players for no gain. To make matters worse, the official penalizes Tech fifteen yards for unnecessary roughness after the play is over.

Facing 4th and 26 on the A&M 37 yard line, Tech elects to have their quarterback punt to A&M. Despite nearly having the kick blocked, Tech's quarterback is able to get the kick off. An A&M safety moves to field it around his own goalline, but a barrage of flash photography happening right around him as the ball is coming down causes him to temporarily lose his vision and muff it. Several players on both teams are unable to pick up the loose ball, with it quickly being kicked and pushed down to the other side of the field. Ultimately, nearly every player on both teams touches the ball at one point, until the original safety meant to receive the punt ends up picking it up in the endzone for what amounts to a hundred-yard fumble and an A&M touchdown. However, a Tech player is able to block the extra point by catching it in his mouth, and the score is 7-6 Tech. A&M kicks off to Tech, and Tech is tackled on their own 25 yard line. Immediately, Tech calls a passing play down the field, but the quarterback throws the ball so hard several of his receivers are unable to catch it, with the ball bouncing off several players before an A&M player intercepts it. The defender manages to sprint down the field for a touchdown, chewing up the field behind him in the process. A&M's extra point, handicapped by the kicker accidentally kicking the holder in the head instead of the ball, dances back and forth on the crossbar several times before the official accidentally shoots a bullet through the ball to signal the end of the half. With the deflated ball draped on the crossbar, all three officials gather together and study the rulebook before agreeing to award A&M half a point.

The game goes to halftime, A&M leading 12.5-7. During the halftime show, three Taxidermy cheerleaders cheer for Taxidermy but unintentionally two of them injured the one in the middle and then themselves in the process. In the halftime locker room, Tech's head coach tries multiple motivational tactics to encourage his players to overcome the deficit in the second half. After retaking the field, the coach puts 'Swivel Hips' Smith back into the game to field the kickoff. Smith makes several A&M defenders miss as he runs down the field, but mere yards short of a potential winning touchdown, he begins showboating and is very roughly tackled by several A&M players. Smith is knocked out and taken off on a stretcher, to the chagrin of the coach. With team doctors and the coach desperately trying to wake Smith up, Tech runs two offensive plays that fail to get into the endzone. The coach is able to revive Smith and quickly shoves him back into the game for what will be the final play of the game. Smith, however, is still dazed and only partially aware of where he is or what he's doing, and Tech has to have a teammate help him receive the direct snap and then push him down the field.

With Smith slowly wandering down the field in an unaware daze, Tech does an expert job of blocking all the A&M defenders from tackling him, leaving Smith as the only player still on his feet. Smith gets his feet tangled in a number eight that peeled off a player's uniform, but is still able to get right down to the goalline. Meanwhile, an A&M defender has managed to get up and doggedly pursues Smith. Smith reaches the goalline, but begins to shakily dance back and forth just shy of it. The A&M defender dives to tackle him with only a second left in the game, but Smith inadvertently moves to the right. The defender dives right past Smith and through the endzone, into one of the poles of the field goal uprights. The upright swings all the way around, the loose pole catching on Smith's pants and yanking him into the endzone as time expires on the game. Tech is awarded a touchdown to win, 13–12.5. The home crowd cheers uproariously, but the Tech head coach seems to have lost his mind on the sideline during the stressful sequence of events. Several men jump him and shove him into a straitjacket.

== Critical reception ==
MoviePilot notes it strange that during the short, the Goofy clones are sometimes shown to lose their anthropomorphic traits and even bark instead of using human speech. This "famous" short "has long been a favorite of Goofy fans". CelebrationPress wrote: "I marvel every time I watch this short; the animators not only successfully poked fun at college football, but they did it using multiple incarnations of essentially the same character." Even today, in Disney Stores memorabilia related to this short can be bought; in particular one of the ornaments in the Goofy Sketchbook Ornament series are from this film. The "original football stadium background" was reused for the 2007 short How to Hook Up Your Home Theater. WDW Radio deemed it "a jaunty revue of all things pigskin and gridiron". Michael Barrier said, "I would place How to Play Football (1944) near the top of the pile of Kinney's sports cartoons."

Disney Film Project notes how effective the short's use of satire is to comment on football:

It mocks the "chaos" of the game and even has a joke where the narrator's explanation of the rules is muffled by the cheers of the crowd, implying that the rules are less than important ... In the end, the short manages to tell the story of a full game, mixed with gags while also highlighting some of the intricacies of football. That's not easy to do.

— Disney Film Project

== Voice cast ==
- Commentary: Frank Bull
- Crowd: Jack Kinney, John Sibley, etc.

== Home media ==
The short was released on December 2, 2002, on Walt Disney Treasures: The Complete Goofy and on Volume 5 of the "Walt Disney's Classic Cartoon Favorites Extreme Sports Fun" series.

== See also ==
- Association football
- History of football
- Most Popular Sports — Football
