= Character animation =

Specialized area of the animation process

Character animation is a specialized area of the animation process, which involves bringing animated characters to life. The role of a character animator is analogous to that of a film or stage actor and character animators are often said to be "actors with a pencil" (or a mouse). Character animators breathe life in their characters, creating the illusion of thought, emotion and personality. Character animation is often distinguished from creature animation, which involves bringing photorealistic animals and creatures to life.

== Origins and history ==
Gertie the Dinosaur, 1914

Winsor McCay's Gertie the Dinosaur (1914) is often considered the first example of true character animation. Later, Otto Messmer imbued Felix the Cat with an instantly recognizable personality during the 1920s.

In the 1930s, Walt Disney made character animation a particular focus of his animation studio, best showcased in productions such as Three Little Pigs (1933), Snow White and the Seven Dwarfs (1937), Pinocchio (1940), and Dumbo (1941). Snow White and the Seven Dwarfs was the "first full length animated and musical feature" in Technicolor. Disney animators such as Bill Tytla, Ub Iwerks, Grim Natwick, Fred Moore, Ward Kimball, Les Clark, John Sibley, Marc Davis, Wolfgang Reitherman, Hal King, Hamilton Luske, Norm Ferguson, Eric Larson, John Lounsbery, Milt Kahl, Frank Thomas and Ollie Johnston all became masters of the technique.

Frank and Ollie, as they were affectionately known by their protégés, taught that the thoughts and emotions behind the character were primary to the creation of every scene. Out of all the Nine Old Men, Frank and Ollie were the most known for their mentor/apprentice relationships, and the sharing of their knowledge about creating characters, most notably as transcribed through Disney Animation: The Illusion of Life. This book relays the 12 basic principles of animation, and is informally considered to be the 'animation bible' for any student of animation.

Other notable figures in character animation include the Schlesinger/Warner Bros. directors (Tex Avery, Chuck Jones, Bob Clampett, Frank Tashlin, Robert McKimson, and Friz Freleng), cartoon animators Max Fleischer and Walter Lantz, pioneering animators Hanna-Barbera, former Disney animator Don Bluth, independent animator Richard Williams, John Lasseter at Pixar, and latter-day Disney animators Andreas Deja, Glen Keane and Eric Goldberg. Character animation is not limited to Hollywood studios, however. Some of the finest examples of character animation can be found in the work of Nick Park of Aardman Animations and Russian independent animator Yuri Norstein.

== Games ==
Though typical examples of character animation are found in animated feature films, the role of character animation within the gaming industry is rapidly increasing. Game developers are using more complicated characters that allow the gamer to more fully connect with the gaming experience. Prince of Persia, God of War, Team Fortress or Resident Evil contain examples of character animation in games.

== Visual effects and creature animation ==
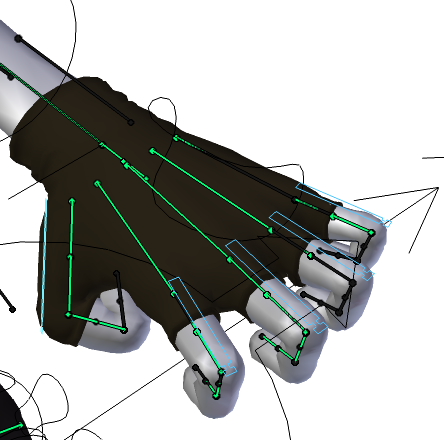
A character rig for skeletal animation

Character animation is often contrasted with creature animation, in which specialised animators bring to life realistic animals and creatures, such as dinosaurs and fantasy creatures. Visual effects animators specialise in animating vehicles, machinery, and natural phenomena such as rain, snow, lightning and water, as well as the "non-natural" effects often seen in science fiction films. There is a good deal of overlap between these areas. Sometimes, visual effects animators will use the same principles of character animation; an early example is the pseudopod in The Abyss.

On-going computer science research on character animation deals with the question of generating multi-layer level of detail at run-time to allow large crowd rendering in real-time applications. Realistic character movements are often simulated using motion capture and soft-body dynamics simulations.

== Bibliography ==
- Goldberg, Eric Character Animation Crash Course Silman-James Press, USA (7 July 2008)] Retrieved September 2012
- Thomas, Frank, and Johnston, Ollie, The Illusion of Life: Disney Animation. Hyperion. (1981, reprint 1997) ISBN 978-0-7868-6070-8.
- Williams, Richard, The Animator's Survival Kit: A Manual of Methods, Principles and Formulas for Computer, Stop-motion, Games and Classical Animators, Faber and Faber, 2002 (expanded edition 2009)
