= Anticipation (animation) =

Principle of animation

Anticipation is one of the fundamental 12 basic principles of animation, as set out by Frank Thomas and Ollie Johnston in their authoritative 1981 book on the Disney Studio titled The Illusion of Life. An anticipation pose or drawing is a preparation for the main action of an animated scene, as distinct from the action and the reaction.

== Definition ==
"Early on at the Disney Studio the animators learned that audiences" could not easily follow the animation unless there was a "planned series of events" leading the eye. Therefore, in order to prepare the audience for an action, the animators would add a so-called anticipation drawing, allowing the audience to anticipate the main action in the scene. This would also help to make the action appear more realistic.

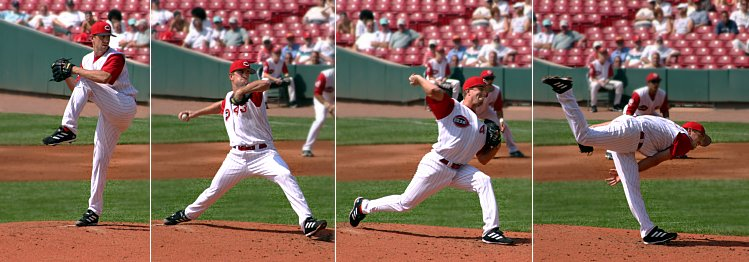
A baseball player making a pitch prepares for the action by moving his arm back. After the anticipation comes the action and the reaction.

For example, a baseball pitcher must "wind up" before throwing the ball. This is called the anticipation for the main action. Equally, a man preparing to run fast would crouch down, "gathering like a spring", and a golfer taking a shot would anticipate it by swinging the club back first. This technique was borrowed from the theatre, and was important in holding the audience's attention. The audience might not know exactly why a character was doing something, but they would at least know what he was doing (or what he was about to do).

The technique can also be used for less physical actions, such as a character looking off-screen to anticipate someone's arrival, or attention focusing on an object that a character is about to pick up.

At the Disney studio, Walt Disney pushed his animators to improve their work, and he was especially insistent that visual gags should be clear, wishing to make sure that the audience could always see everything clearly so they could anticipate what was going to happen. He called this technique "aiming", and would act out actions himself, exaggerating them so that the animators could clearly capture the effect.

Les Clark, one of Disney's most talented animators, and later one of Disney's Nine Old Men later said of this discovery: "Today it may look simple to us; at the time it wasn't. It was something that hadn't been tried before or proved".

By contrast, the anticipation pose can also be omitted in cases where it might be expected. The resulting sense of anticlimax will produce a feeling of surprise in the viewer, and can often add comedy to a scene. This is often referred to as a 'surprise gag'.

== See also ==
- 12 basic principles of animation
- Disney Animation: The Illusion of Life
- Follow through and overlapping action
- Squash and stretch
