= Straight-ahead animation =

Method of animation

Straight ahead is a term used in animation that refers to a method that uses only the first key pose of a character and then continues drawing the character to create the desired motion. It was first referred to in the 1981 book The Illusion of Life, by Ollie Johnson and Frank Thomas, and is a part of their twelve basic principles of animation. It contrasts with its converse, pose-to-pose animation, in that it does not use inbetweening. Straight-ahead action is so named because the animator literally works straight ahead from the first drawing of the scene. Disney director-animator Woolie Reitherman said, "When I didn't know what I was doing in an action, I always went straight-ahead. I'd just start on ones. Half the time I didn't know what I was doing. To me, it's fun. You find out something you wouldn't have found out otherwise."

== Advantages and risks ==
Straight-ahead animation is mostly used for wild, scrambling actions where spontaneity is important. Because the animator has no real guide to the target destination in the action, a character's form may start to shrink or grow, and the animator will have no idea it happened until after they are done. Although this technique is more spontaneous and creative than using set poses, it can create inaccurate results.

=== Advantages ===
- It produces a natural flow of fluid, spontaneous action.
- It has the vitality of improvisation.
- Its development is very creative, as the animator improvises all of the action.
- Often it engages the unconscious mind.
- It can produce surprises, what animators call "magic".

=== Risks ===
- Shots can wander.
- Shots can become overlong.
- Characters can change in size erratically.
- The animator can miss the point of a shot.
- The director cannot see what is happening in the shot, making it difficult for more than one animator to work on the scene.

The best way for an animator to make use of the straight-ahead action is to use it to animate things that have very erratic and unpredictable movement patterns. Fire, water, and fog are some examples of movement that are better animated in this way.
