= Fumi Kitahara =

American publicist (1968–2025)

Fumi Kitahara Otto (March 2, 1968 – February 24, 2025) was an American publicist in the animation industry. Over a 30-year career, she led publicity and awards campaigns for studios including DreamWorks Animation, Aardman Animations, Laika, Netflix, and Disney. She was regarded as one of the premier publicists for animated content and was instrumental in raising the profile of animation within the wider entertainment industry.

== Early life and education ==
Fumi Kitahara was born on March 2, 1968. She attended California State University, Northridge (CSUN), graduating with a degree in business marketing.

== Career ==
=== Walt Disney Studios (1992–1996) ===
Kitahara began her career in 1992 at Walt Disney Studios, working under veteran Disney publicist Howard Green. During her tenure at Disney, she helped promote several notable animated features, including The Lion King (1994), Pocahontas (1995), Toy Story (1995), The Nightmare Before Christmas (1993), and the documentary Frank and Ollie (1995). She also supported campaigns for various live-action titles.

=== DreamWorks Animation (1996–2007) ===
In 1996, Kitahara joined the fledgling DreamWorks SKG and helped establish its animation publicity department. She served as DreamWorks’ Head of Animation Publicity for the next 11 years, launching award-focused campaigns for numerous high-profile films. Among these were The Prince of Egypt (1998), Shrek (2001)—which won the inaugural Academy Award for Best Animated Feature—and Aardman’s Chicken Run (2000) and Wallace & Gromit: The Curse of the Were-Rabbit (2005).

=== Independent publicity and consulting (2007–2025) ===
After leaving DreamWorks in 2007, Kitahara founded her own boutique publicity firm, sometimes referred to as “the PR Kitchen.” In addition to her consulting work with studios such as Aardman, Baobab Studios, Laika, and Netflix, Kitahara also worked as an entertainment publicist at Google Spotlight Stories for four years. Through her firm, she managed publicity and awards campaigns for numerous animated features and shorts. Among the feature films she helped promote were Coraline (2009), How to Train Your Dragon (2010), Kubo and the Two Strings (2016), Over the Moon (2020), and Guillermo del Toro’s Pinocchio (2022), many of which received Academy Award nominations or wins.

She also oversaw campaigns for Oscar-winning or Oscar-nominated short films, including If Anything Happens I Love You (2020), The Boy, the Mole, the Fox and the Horse (2022), The Windshield Wiper (2021), and War Is Over! Inspired by the Music of John and Yoko (2023). In addition, Kitahara supported Google Spotlight Stories projects—such as Duet (2014), Pearl (2016), and Age of Sail (2018)—and worked with Baobab Studios on titles including Baba Yaga (2020) and Namoo (2021).

Kitahara was the PR Chair of Women in Animation for over a decade. She also served as "a member of the Public Relations branch" of the Academy of Motion Picture Arts and Sciences.

== Personal life and death ==
Kitahara was married to Swiss-born animation director Simon Otto. The couple had one son, Max. Kitahara sometimes used the combined name Fumi Kitahara Otto.

Kitahara died in Los Angeles on February 24, 2025, after a prolonged struggle with a rare blood cancer. She was 56. Her family publicly announced her death, prompting an outpouring of tributes from leading figures and colleagues across the animation industry. Nick Park of Aardman Animations described her as possessing “years of unrelenting enthusiasm,” and producer Bonnie Arnold lauded her “positive energy and effort in making connections." Animator and director Glen Keane remembered her as “a life force of joy” who uplifted countless filmmakers with her support. She was interred at Forest Lawn Memorial Park in Glendale, California.

Kitahara was recognised during the "In Memoriam" segment of the 97th Academy Awards. Women in Animation plans to establish the Fumi Kitahara Membership and Scholarship Fund, "to recognize the impact Fumi has had on the members of WIA she lifted up through her hard work over the years".

== Selected work ==
Films

- The Nightmare Before Christmas (1993)
- The Lion King (1994)
- Frank and Ollie (1995)
- Pocahontas (1995)
- Toy Story (1995)
- The Prince of Egypt (1998)
- Chicken Run (2000)
- Shrek (2001)
- Shrek 2 (2004)
- Wallace & Gromit: The Curse of the Were-Rabbit (2005)
- Shrek the Third (2007)
- Coraline (2009)
- Waking Sleeping Beauty (2009)
- Walt & El Grupo (2009)
- How to Train Your Dragon (2010)
- ParaNorman (2012)
- The Pirates! Band of Misfits (2012)
- Joanna (2013)
- The Boxtrolls (2014)
- Shaun the Sheep Movie (2015)
- Tyrus (2015)
- Kubo and the Two Strings (2016)
- Mirai (2018)
- I Lost My Body (2019)
- Klaus (2019)
- Missing Link (2019)
- A Shaun the Sheep Movie: Farmageddon (2019)
- Over the Moon (2020)
- The Mitchells vs The Machines (2021)
- Guillermo del Toro's Pinocchio (2022)
- The Sea Beast (2022)

Shorts

- French Roast (2008)
- The Gruffalo (2009)
- Adam and Dog (2011)
- A Morning Stroll (2011)
- Room on the Broom (2013)
- Duet (2014)
- Pearl (2016)
- Revolting Rhymes (2016)
- Robin Robin (2021)
- The Windshield Wiper (2021)
