= Deaths of Peck =

Upcoming 2D-platformer rhythm video game by The Line Studio

- Promotional cover
- Developer: The Line Studio
- Publisher: The Line Studio
- Producers: James Duveen; Tabitha Kearney
- Artist: JuanPe Arroyo
- Writer: JuanPe Arroyo
- Composer: Box of Toys Audio
- Platform: Microsoft Windows
- Genre: Rhythm
- Mode: Single-player

Deaths of Peck is an upcoming 2D-platformer rhythm video game.

== Gameplay ==
The game revolves around Peck, a small goblin cursed with immortality, who must move through a dangerous tower populated by hostile orcs to rescue his captured friends. Rather than avoiding hazards like knives, hammers, and fire, players actively seek out and trigger these dangers, with each gruesome "death" resembling a unique modification that grants Peck specific abilities to solve puzzles and bypass obstacles. Its loop centers on managing Peck’s physical form through a death and revival rhythm. In his base form, Peck possesses movement capabilities, such as running, jumping, and wall-jumping. However, interacting with specific traps drastically alters his morphology. For instance, getting sliced in half by a blade enables Peck to execute a double jump by utilizing his severed upper body and legs independently. Alternatively, being crushed by heavy hammers morphs Peck into a squishy, jelly-like blob, allowing him to cling to wall pins, zip along structural bars, and squeeze through narrow passages that are otherwise inaccessible. Getting set on fire transforms him into an unstoppable blazing force capable of burning down obstacles and enemy orcs.

To navigate the strict verticality of the game's levels, players must constantly toggle between these death states and Peck's regular body using an active regeneration mechanic. Players can manually heal Peck back to his original form at any time, which sheds his current temporary mutation but restores his default movement suite. This creates intricate platforming sequences where a player might need to get cut in half to cross a high gap, heal mid-air to regain their default state, and immediately trigger a different hazard to proceed. Conversely, environmental elements like healing mushrooms restore Peck automatically upon contact, forcing players to carefully avoid them to prevent losing a necessary traversal ability. Although Peck cannot permanently perish, precision remains critical; failing a jump or mistiming a transformation frequently results in tumbling down the tower, erasing vertical progress.

== Production ==
Deaths of Peak is a fast-paced 2D-platformer rhythm video game and is currently in development from London-based studio The Line Studio, known for their work on commercial animation, music videos, and video game work. It was designed and written by JuanPe Arroyoto and executive produced by James Duveen, with music credits from Box of Toys Audio, and Tabitha Kearney serving as its development production coordinator.

=== Development ===
As the project began in 2020, Deaths of Peck creator JuanPe Arroyo intended the project to be an "exercise to overcome industry burnout" but evolved from a sketch to playable prototype in six years. His intention for the project was to create a single character and animate it quickly while repeating "the same action endlessly." He explained during a Cartoon Brew interview that Peck "became the character that helped me find my way back." Throughout its development, Arroyo said that it "stopped feeling like a throwaway gag" to the point he would sketch Peck a hundred times. He thought he would get bored and tired of the repetitive progress, but never did, along with some help from a growing fanbase. Deaths of Peck shows a dark sense of humor, in which fans would provide ideas to Arroyo on how Peck should "die", making the project collaborative which he described as "really fun."

=== Design ===
For the video game's concept, Peck would get mutilated in multiple ways while remaining immortal. Each time Peck gets "killed", he received new abilities on how he interacts with obstacles with his mutilated body, which Arroyo described as turning "failure into a strategic tool." The video game's hand-drawn animation style emphasizes exaggerated squash-and-stretch with a blend of "playful and gruesome" themes. Instead of animating full sequences as Arroyo had been used to, he broke the animation's movement into smaller components so the video game's engine could "trigger and combine."

The narrative and setting structures of Deaths of Peck showcase two main environments: a goblin village representing a home for Peck, while an orc-dominated tower serves as the game's challenge. The towards is visually filled with hazards and enemies, while the village presents an environment of rebuilding and regrouping, giving natural contrast to the video game. Arroyo stated that Peck was more self-interested in earlier version of Deaths of Peck but evolved into him willing to save his friends.

=== Pitch ===
Arroyo then developed Deaths of Peck into a short film concept and previewed it on Spain's Weird Market, where animation projects are previewed in front of a live audience prior to its completion. He later described the experience as a "comedy open mic but for animation". As people were amused on Peck's "deaths", Arroyo saw the game's purpose as working. When given the opportunity to pitch it to London-based studio The Line, Arroyo took a couple of weeks to think of the idea, as while he did have an appealing character with "repetition and variation", he didn't have much technical experience as a video game developer.

== Promotion and release ==
The teaser trailer for Deaths of Peck was released on April 7, 2026. In anticipation of its release, Deaths of Peck has received event promotions in Kyoto, Japan; the Annecy Festival in France; Brighton, UK; Shanghai, China; London; and Cologne, Germany. As of now, the only available version of the video game is the prototype, which was given feedback from players and industry figures. It is set to be released on Steam, in which Deaths of Peck could be added on the user's wishlist.
