= Disney's Nine Old Men =

Core group of animators for Walt Disney Productions in the mid-20th century

Disney's Nine Old Men. From left to right: Back row: Milt Kahl, Marc Davis, Frank Thomas, Eric Larson, and Ollie Johnston. Front row: Woolie Reitherman, Les Clark, Ward Kimball, and John Lounsbery.

Disney's Nine Old Men were a group of Walt Disney Productions' core animators, who worked at the studio from the 1920s to the 1980s. Some of the Nine Old Men also worked as directors, creating some of Disney's most popular animated movies from Snow White and the Seven Dwarfs to The Rescuers. The group was named by Walt Disney, (Note: According to Frank Thomas, they formed a board that studied all the possible problems affecting the company in relation to its works, but the number of members varied regularly. One day, when Walt Disney learned that there were nine people on the board at the time, he named the group "Nine Old Men". Walt Disney was jokingly referring to the then-famous 1936 bestselling book The Nine Old Men written by Robert S. Allen and Drew Pearson about the nine justices of the Supreme Court of the United States, most of whom were over the age of 70 at the time; meanwhile, the Disney nine were all in their thirties. In turn, the U.S. Supreme Court was targeted as dominated by very old men by the proposed Judicial Procedures Reform Bill of 1937, whose enactment was allegedly averted by the switch in time that saved nine. According to investigator Neal Gabler, the board was created between 1945 and 1947 as part of the reorganization that the study had to reduce company expenses.) and they worked in both short and feature films. Disney delegated more and more tasks to them in the animation department in the 1950s when their interests expanded, and diversified their scope. Eric Larson was the last to retire from Disney, after his role as animation consultant on The Great Mouse Detective in 1986. All nine members of the group were acknowledged as Disney Legends in 1989 and all would receive the Winsor McCay Award for their lifetime or career contributions to the art of animation.

== History ==
The nine were all hired by Disney in the 1920s and 1930s, working initially on Disney's shorter productions, and later on theatrical projects. All nine were present by the release of Snow White and the Seven Dwarfs (1937). According to researcher Neal Gabler and animator Frank Thomas, a board was formed to study all possible problems affecting the company in relation to its work between 1945 and 1947. One day in the early 1950s, Disney named the nine members on the board "Nine Old Men". Disney delegated more and more tasks to them in the field of animation as the work of the company diversified. As well as being honored as Disney Legends in 1989, all of the Nine Old Men were separately honored with the Winsor McCay Award (the lifetime achievement award for animators) during the 1970s, 1980s and 1992.

They began to retire one by one in the 1970s, with Eric Larson's 1986 animation consultancy for The Great Mouse Detective being the group's last animation work at Disney. Frank Thomas and Ollie Johnston in particular continued on outside of Disney for some time and were credited on several films in the 1980s and 1990s, including The Chipmunk Adventure (1987), Little Nemo: Adventures in Slumberland (1992) and The Iron Giant (1999). A documentary which interviewed the duo, entitled Frank and Ollie, was released by Disney in 1995. They were honoured with a final voiced cameo in The Incredibles in 2004, which was produced by Disney but animated by a then-independent Pixar. Ollie Johnston, the last surviving member of the group, died in 2008.

== Members ==
- John Lounsbery (March 9, 1911 – February 13, 1976) started in 1935 and, working under Norm "Fergy" Ferguson, quickly became a star animator. Lounsbery, affectionately known as "Louns" by his fellow animators, was an incredibly strong draftsman who inspired many animators over the years. His animation was noted for its squashy, stretchy feel. Lounsbery animated J. Worthington Foulfellow and Gideon (in Pinocchio), Ben Ali Gator (in Dance of the Hours), George Darling (in Peter Pan), Tony, Joe, and some of the dogs (in Lady and the Tramp), Kings Stefan and Hubert (in Sleeping Beauty), The Elephants (in The Jungle Book), and many others. In the 1970s, Louns was promoted to Director and co-directed Winnie the Pooh and Tigger Too and his last film, The Rescuers, which was completed and released posthumously.
- Les Clark (November 17, 1907 – September 12, 1979), "The Mickey Mouse Master", who joined Disney in 1927. Although Clark started his career at Disney working on the Alice Comedies shorts, his specialty was animating Mickey Mouse, since he was the only one of the Nine Old Men to work on that character from its origins with Ub Iwerks. Les did many scenes throughout the years, animating up until Lady and the Tramp. He moved into directing in the late 1950s and made many animated featurettes and shorts, although since 1964 almost all the films on which Clark worked are short films.
- Woolie Reitherman (June 26, 1909 – May 22, 1985) joined Disney in 1933 as an animator. In the late 1950s, Reitherman was promoted to director. Beginning with The Sword in the Stone in 1963, he directed all animated Disney films until his retirement in 1980. He also directed a sequence in Sleeping Beauty which featured Prince Phillip's escape from Maleficent's castle and his eventual battle against her as a terrible fire-breathing dragon. Some of his work includes Monstro (in Pinocchio), The Headless Horseman (in The Legend of Sleepy Hollow), the Crocodile (in Peter Pan), and the Rat (in Lady and the Tramp). Demoted following creative conflicts during production of The Fox and the Hound, Reitherman ultimately retired in 1980.
- Milt Kahl (March 22, 1909 – April 19, 1987) started in 1934 working on Snow White. His work included heroes such as Pinocchio (in Pinocchio), Tigger (in the original Winnie the Pooh featurettes), Peter Pan (in Peter Pan), and Slue-Foot Sue (in Pecos Bill) and villains such as Madam Mim (in The Sword in the Stone), Shere Khan (in The Jungle Book), Edgar the butler (in The Aristocats), the Sheriff of Nottingham (in Robin Hood), and Madame Medusa (in The Rescuers), his final work for Disney prior to his retirement in 1976.
- Eric Larson (September 3, 1905 – October 25, 1988) joined in 1933. One of the top animators at Disney, he animated notable characters such as Peg (in Lady and the Tramp), the Vultures (in The Jungle Book), Peter Pan's flight over London to Neverland (in Peter Pan), and Brer Rabbit, Brer Fox, and Brer Bear (in Song of the South). Because of his demeanor and ability to train new talent, Larson was given the task of spotting and training new animators at Disney in the 1970s. Many of the top talents at Disney in later years were trained by Larson in the 1970s and 1980s.
- Marc Davis (March 30, 1913 – January 12, 2000) started in 1935 on Snow White, and later he went on to develop/animate the characters of Bambi and Thumper (in Bambi), Tinker Bell (in Peter Pan), Maleficent, Aurora and the raven (in Sleeping Beauty), and Cruella de Vil (in One Hundred and One Dalmatians). From 1961, Davis restricted his duties to his work at Disneyland. Davis was responsible for character design for both the Pirates of the Caribbean and Haunted Mansion attractions at Disneyland.

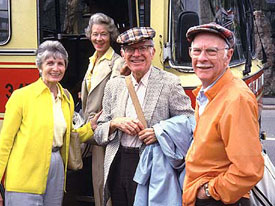
Frank Thomas (center) and Ollie Johnston (right) with their wives in 1985

- Ward Kimball (March 4, 1914 – July 8, 2002) joined Disney in 1934 and retired in 1974. His work includes Jiminy Cricket (in Pinocchio), Lucifer, Jaq, and Gus (in Cinderella), and the Mad Hatter and Cheshire Cat (in Alice in Wonderland). Specializing in drawing comic characters, Kimball produced work that was often more "wild" than the other Disney animators. In 1968 he created and released a non-Disney anti-Vietnam War animated short, Escalation.
- Frank Thomas (September 5, 1912 – September 8, 2004) joined Disney in 1934. He went on to author the animator's bible The Illusion of Life with Ollie Johnston. His work included Lady Tremaine (in Cinderella), the Queen of Hearts (in Alice in Wonderland), and Captain Hook (in Peter Pan). Frank also was responsible for the spaghetti scene in Lady and the Tramp. He departed Disney alongside Johnston in 1978, but often returned while working on their books.
- Ollie Johnston (October 31, 1912 – April 14, 2008), who joined Disney in 1935, first worked on Snow White. He went on to author the animator's bible The Illusion of Life with Frank Thomas. His work includes Mr. Smee (in Peter Pan), the Stepsisters (in Cinderella), the District Attorney (in The Wind in the Willows), and Prince John (in Robin Hood). According to the book The Disney Villain, written by Johnston and Frank Thomas, Johnston also partnered with Thomas on creating characters such as Ichabod Crane (in The Legend of Sleepy Hollow) and Sir Hiss (in Robin Hood). Johnston, alongside Thomas, retired from Disney in 1978, with their final animation appearing in The Fox and the Hound. While working on their books, they often stayed at the studio, selecting illustrations from the studio's archive.

In 2012, Frank Thomas' son Theodore Thomas produced Growing up with Nine Old Men, a documentary featuring the children of the animators remembering their fathers. The documentary was included in both the Diamond edition of the Peter Pan DVD in the US, and the re-release of The Jungle Book in Europe.

== Legacy ==
=== Books and influence ===
The phrase "Disney's Nine Old Men" was already widely known in the global animation industry by the 1970s. According to Andreas Deja, while he was still a young art student in Germany, he had already heard of the phrase and "knew the names of this elite group of animators from books and magazine articles". Before he came to the Disney studio in 1980, he was not aware that Lounsbery and Clark had already died, but he was then lucky enough "to get to know and become friends" with all seven surviving Nine Old Men.

In 1981, after retiring, Johnston and Thomas published the book Disney Animation: The Illusion of Life, which sets out the 12 basic principles of animation and helps to preserve the animation techniques that the Disney company created.

Another important component of the Nine Old Men's legacy are the many animators in the contemporary animation industry who can directly or indirectly trace their training to someone who was either their apprentice at Disney Animation or their student at CalArts. For example, Wayne Unten, the supervising animator for Elsa in Disney's Frozen, has noted that he apprenticed with John Ripa, who in turn apprenticed with Glen Keane, who in turn apprenticed with Johnston.

=== Basic principles of animation ===
As part of their work for Disney, the Nine Old Men refined the 12 basic principles of animation:

1. Squash and stretch
2. Anticipation
3. Staging
4. Straight Ahead Action and Pose to Pose
5. Follow Through and Overlapping Action
6. Slow In and Slow Out
7. Arcs
8. Secondary Action
9. Timing
10. Exaggeration
11. Solid Drawing
12. Appeal

== Feature films ==
Title	Year	Les Clark	Marc Davis	Ollie Johnston	Milt Kahl	Ward Kimball	Eric Larson	John Lounsbery	Woolie Reitherman	Frank Thomas
Snow White and the Seven Dwarfs	1937	Animator	Animator and designer for Snow White	Assistant animator	Animator for The Prince and the Forest Animals	Animator	Animator for Forest Animals and Dwarfs on deer	Assistant animator	Animator for the Slave in the Magic Mirror	Animator for The Dwarfs
Pinocchio	1940	Animator		Animator for Pinocchio	Animation director/animator for Pinocchio and some scenes of Jiminy Cricket	Animation director/designer and animator for Jiminy Cricket	Animation director for Figaro, Cleo, Marionettes and Donkeys	Animator	Animation director for Pinocchio, Jiminy Cricket and Monstro	Animator for Pinocchio
Fantasia	1940	Animator for Mickey Mouse in “The Sorcerer’s Apprentice”	Animator	Animator for Centaurettes and Cupids in "Pastoral Symphony" segment	Animator	Animation supervisor for the segment "The Pastoral Symphony"	Animation supervisor for the segment "The Pastoral Symphony"	Animator for the segment "Dance of the Hours"	Animation supervisor for the segment "The Rite of Spring	Animator
The Reluctant Dragon	1941	Animator				Animator and cameo appearance	Animator		Animator and cameo appearance	Animator
Dumbo	1941	Animator	N/A			Animation director for Crows	N/A	Animation director		N/A
Bambi	1942	Animator	Animator and designer for Bambi, Faline, female rabbit, Flower and female skunk	Animator for Bambi's mother's death and Thumper reciting his father's lesson	Supervising animator for Bambi, Thumper and Deer	N/A	Supervising animator for Thumper and Friend Owl	Supervising animator		Animator for Bambi and Thumper ice-skating
Saludos Amigos	1942	Animator	Animator	Animator	Animator for the rides a Llama sequence	Animator				
The Three Caballeros	1944	Animator	Animator	Animator for Donald Duck and "The Flying Gauchito" segment	Animator		Animator for "The Flying Gauchito", Donald Duck, Jose Carioca, Panchito and Aracuan segments	Animator for Donald Duck	N/A	Animator for "The Flying Gauchito" segment
Make Mine Music	1946	Animator	Animator	Animator for "Peter and the Wolf" and "Casey at the Bat" segments	Animator for "The Martins and the Coys" and "All the Cats Join In"	Animator for "Peter and the Wolf","Casey at the Bat" and Willie the Operatic Whale segments	Animator for "Casey at the Bat" and "Peter and the Wolf"	Animator for "Peter and the Wolf"	N/A	Animator
Song of the South	1946	Animator	Directing animator, animator and designer for Brer Rabbit, Brer Fox and Brer Bear	Animator for Br'er Rabbit, Br'er Fox and Br'er Bear	Directing animator for Br'er Rabbit, Br'er Fox and Br'er Bear (The Tar Baby sequence)	Animator	Directing animator		N/A	Animator
Fun and Fancy Free	1947	Directing animator	Animator and designer for Bongo, butterfly and yawning trees	Animator for Jiminy Cricket	Animator for Lulubelle, Lumpjaw and bears (uncredited)	Directing animator	Animator	Directing animator for Jiminy Cricket and Willie the Giant	Directing animator	Animator
Melody Time	1948	Directing animator	Animator	Animator for Johnny Appleseed, Johnny's Guardian Angel, Johnny's Ghost and Little Toot	Directing animator for the Johnny Appleseed, Johnny's Guardian Angel, Pecos Bill, Widowmaker and Slue Foot Sue segments	Directing animator for Pecos Bill sequences	Directing animator for "Once Upon A Wintertime", "Johnny Appleseed" and "Little Toot" segments	Directing animator for "Once Upon A Wintertime", "Blame it on the Samba" and "Pecos Bill"	Animator	
So Dear to My Heart	1948	Animator								
The Adventures of Ichabod and Mr. Toad	1949	Animator	Animator and designer for Mr. Toad, Cyril Proudbottom, Rat, Mole, Angus MacBadger, Mr. Winkie and the weasels	Directing animator/animator for J. Thaddeus Toad, Ratty, Moley, Angus Macbadger, The Prosecutor, The Judge, Ichabod Crane, Katrina Von Tassel, Baltus Von Tassel and Brom Bones	Directing animator for Angus MacBadger, Rat, Mole, angry mob and Brom Bones	Directing animator and character animator of both shorts	Animator	Directing animator	Directing animator for the Headless Horseman	Directing animator/animator for Mr. Toad, Cyril Proudbottom, Rat, Mole, Ichabod Crane and his horse, Katrina Von Tassel, Brom Bones and laughing fat lady
Cinderella	1950	Directing animator	Animator and designer for Cinderella, Stepsisters (tearing Cinderella's dress apart), Prince Charming, the King (close up of hands and bookends) and the Grand Duke (close up of hands and bookends)	Directing animator/animator for Stepsisters and Lackey	Directing animator for Fairy Godmother, Prince Charming, the King and the Grand Duke	Directing animator for Jaq and Gus and Lucifer the Cat	Directing animator for Cinderella and Prince Charming	Directing animator for Jaq	Directing animator	Directing animator/animator for Lady Tremaine and Grand Duke
Alice in Wonderland	1951	Directing animator for Alice	Animator and designer for Alice and the eyeglasses creature	Directing animator/animator for Alice and King of Hearts	Directing animator for Alice, the White Rabbit (one scene), the Dodo, Flamingo and Hedgehog	Directing animator/designer and animator for Tweedledee and Tweedledum, the Walrus and the Carpenter, Cheshire Cat, Mad Hatter and Tea Party sequence	Directing animator for Alice, Dinah, Caterpillar and Queen Of Hearts	Directing animator	Directing animator for Dodo and Bill	Directing animator/animator for Queen of Hearts, Doorknob, strange creatures, a few scenes of the King of Hearts and Cheshire Cat (trial scene)
Peter Pan	1953	Directing animator	Animator and designer for Tinker Bell and Mrs. Darling	Directing animator/animator for Mr. Smee and a few scenes of Captain Hook	Directing animator for Peter Pan, Wendy Darling, John Darling, Michael Darling, Mr. Darling, Mrs. Darling and Nana	Directing animator	Directing animator for Peter Pan, Wendy and Captain Hook	Directing animator	Directing animator for Captain Hook	Directing animator/animator for Captain Hook and a few scenes of Mr. Smee
Lady and the Tramp	1955	Directing animator	Animator	Directing animator/animator for Lady, Jock and Trusty	Directing animator for Lady, Tramp, Mr. Busy the Beaver and Trusty	N/A	Directing animator for Lady, Tramp, Beaver and Peg	Directing animator for The Tramp	Directing animator	Directing animator/animator for Lady, Tramp and Jock
Sleeping Beauty	1959	Sequence director	Animator and designer for Aurora, Maleficent, Diablo the Raven, Prince Phillip (a few scenes), King Stefan and Queen Leah	Directing animator/animator for Flora, Fauna, and Merryweather	Directing animator for Prince Phillip, King Hubert, King Stefan, Maitre D', animals and Samson	N/A	Sequence director	Directing animator for King Hubert and King Stefan	Sequence director	Directing animator/animator for Flora, Fauna and Merryweather
One Hundred and One Dalmatians	1961	Character animator	Directing animator for Cruella De Vil and Anita	Directing animator for Perdita	Directing animator for Roger and Anita, Pongo, Perdita and Labrador	N/A	Directing animator for Pongo, Perdita, Puppies, Colonel and Tibbs	Directing animator for Pongo	Sequence director	Directing animator for Pongo
The Sword in the Stone	1963	Animator (uncredited)	N/A	Directing animator/animator for Merlin, Wart, Archimedes and Sugar Bowl	Character designer/directing animator for Wart (a.k.a. King Arthur), Merlin, Sir Ector, Kay, Archimedes, Kitchen Woman, Madame Mim and Dogs	N/A	Animator for Wart, Merlin, Archimedes, Sir Ector and Madam Mim	Directing animator	Director	Directing animator/animator for Wart, Merlin, Squirrel Scene and Madam Mim
Mary Poppins	1964	N/A	N/A	Animator for the Penguins	Animator for the Master of hounds, hounds, fox and stewards	Animator	Animator for Forest animals and Racers	N/A	Animator	Animator for the Penguins
The Jungle Book	1967	N/A	N/A	Directing animator for Mowgli, Bagheera, Baloo and the Girl	Directing animator for Mowgli, Baloo, Bagheera, Shere Khan, King Louie, monkeys, Kaa and the Vultures	N/A	Animator for Mowgli, Bagheera and Vultures	Directing animator for Colonel Haiti, Elephants and Shere Khan	Director	Directing animator for Mowgli, Baloo, Bagheera, Kaa, King Louie and Flunkey Monkey
The Aristocats	1970	N/A	N/A	Directing animator for Duchess, Thomas O' Malley, Marie, Berlioz, Toulouse, Amelia and Abigail Gabble and Uncle Waldo	Directing animator for Thomas O'Malley, Duchess, Madame Bonfamille, Edgar and George	N/A	Animator for Roquefort, Kittens and Scat Cat	Directing animator	Producer and director	Directing animator for Duchess, Thomas O' Malley, Edgar, Napoleon and Lafayette
Bedknobs and Broomsticks	1971	N/A	N/A	Animator	Animator for King Leonidas, Secretary Bird and the animals	Animation director	Animator		N/A	Animator
Robin Hood	1973	N/A	N/A	Directing animator for Prince John, Sir Hiss, Robin Hood and Little John disguised as fortune tellers, Maid Marian and Lady Cluck	Directing animator for Robin Hood, The Sheriff of Nottingham, Little John, Allan-a-Dale (the rooster), Maid Marian, Lady Kluck, Friar Tuck, Skippy and King Richard	N/A	Character animator for Robin Hood, Little John and Vultures	Directing animator for Robin Hood	Producer and director	Directing animator for Robin Hood disguised as stork, Sheriff of Nottingham, Maid Marian and Skippy
The Many Adventures of Winnie the Pooh	1977	N/A	N/A	Animator for Winnie the Pooh and Piglet	Animator for Tigger, Winnie the Pooh (scenes with Tigger) and a few scenes of Roo	N/A	Animator for Kanga, Roo and Winnie The Pooh	Animator for Owl, Eeyore and Gopher / Director	Producer and director	Animator for Winnie the Pooh and Piglet
The Rescuers	1977	N/A	N/A	Directing animator for Bernard, Bianca, Penny, Rufus and Orville	Directing animator for Madame Medusa, Mr. Snoops, Penny, Brutus and Nero and a few scenes of Bernard and Bianca	N/A	Animator	Director	Producer and director	Directing animator for Bernard, Miss Bianca, The Chairman, Orville, Brutus, Nero, Ellie Mae, Luke and The Swamp Folk
The Fox and the Hound	1981	N/A	N/A	Supervising animator for Young Tod and Young Copper	N/A		Animation consultant	N/A	Co-producer	Supervising animator for Young Tod and Young Copper
The Black Cauldron	1985	N/A	Character designer (uncredited)	N/A	Character designer (uncredited)	N/A	Animation consultant	N/A	N/A	
The Great Mouse Detective	1986	N/A		N/A	N/A		Animation consultant	N/A	N/A	
