= Follow through and overlapping action =

Animation principles

The woman's dress follows her movements, but more slowly.

Follow through and overlapping action is a general heading for two closely related animation techniques which form part of the 12 basic principles of animation identified by Disney animators Frank Thomas and Ollie Johnston in their authoritative 1981 book on Disney animation, The Illusion of Life. The term drag is sometimes included to form three separate but related concepts in the art of animation.

== Definition ==
Follow through and overlapping action are closely related techniques which, when applied to animation, can help to render movement more realistically by more closely obeying the laws of physics. At the Disney Studio, Walt Disney was eager to push his animators to improve their work and develop their skills. He told them:

Things don't come to a stop all at once guys; first there's one part and then another

The animators, keen to make their work feel more convincing, developed the concepts of "follow through" and "overlapping action", though the concepts were so closely related that they were not always easy to distinguish. Thomas and Johnston identified five areas of motion where these principles would apply:

1. A character might have a coat or long ears, and these parts would keep moving once the figure had stopped moving. The ears, or coat, would "follow through" even after the main action had stopped.
2. Bodies in motion do not move all at once, rather different parts of a body may move at different speeds. Therefore, as one part of the body stops, another part (such as an arm), might overlap or follow through the main action, slowly settling to a stop.
3. Loose flesh, such as a dog's floppy jowls, might move at a slower speed than the more solid parts of the character. These parts might drag behind the main action.
4. The completion of an action—how the action "follows through"—is often more important than the action itself.
5. The "moving hold". A character might come to a complete halt, but the fleshy parts might follow through the main action in order to convey weight and believability.

== See also ==
- Squash and stretch

== Bibliography ==
- Bancroft, Tom; Glen Keane (2006). Creating Characters with Personality: For Film, TV, Animation, Video Games, and Graphic Novels. Watson-Guptill. ISBN 978-0-8230-2349-3.
- Johnston, Ollie, and Thomas, Frank, The Illusion of Life, Abbeville Press, New York (1981)
- Lasseter, John (July 1987). "Principles of traditional animation applied to 3D computer animation". ACM SIGGRAPH Computer Graphics. 21 (4): 35–44. doi:10.1145/37402.37407. Archived from the original on 2011-11-28.
- Mattesi, Mike (2002). Force: Dynamic Life Drawing for Animators, Second Edition. Focal Press. ISBN 978-0-240-80845-1.
- Osipa, Jason (2005). Stop Staring: Facial Modeling and Animation Done Right (2nd ed.). John Wiley & Sons. ISBN 978-0-471-78920-8.
- Whitaker, Harold; John Halas (2002). Timing for Animation. Focal Press. ISBN 978-0-240-51714-8.
- White, Tony (1998). The Animator's Workbook: Step-By-Step Techniques of Drawn Animation. Watson-Guptill. ISBN 978-0-8230-0229-0.
