= Brave Little Tailor =

1938 Mickey Mouse cartoon

- Title card
- Directed by: Bill Roberts; Burt Gillett
- Story by: Joe Grant
- Produced by: Walt Disney
- Starring: Walt Disney; Eddie Holden; Billy Sheets
- Music by: Albert Hay Malotte
- Animation by: Les Clark; Ollie Johnston; Fred Moore; Don Patterson; Milt Schaffer; Frank Thomas; Riley Thompson; Bill Tytla; Don Williams; Jack Campbell (effects); Andy Engman (effects); Tony Garth (effects); John Noel Tucker (effects)
- Color process: Technicolor
- Production company: Walt Disney Productions
- Distributed by: RKO Radio Pictures
- Release date: September 23, 1938
- Running time: 9 minutes
- Country: United States
- Language: English

Brave Little Tailor is a 1938 American animated short film produced by Walt Disney Productions and released by RKO Radio Pictures, being shown in theaters with Fugitives for a Night. It is an adaptation of the fairy tale The Valiant Little Tailor with Mickey Mouse in the title role. It was directed by Bill Roberts and Burt Gillett and features original music by Albert Hay Malotte. The voice cast includes Walt Disney as Mickey, and Eddie Holden as the Giant. It was the 103rd short in the Mickey Mouse film series to be released, and the fifth for that year.

The film was nominated for the Academy Award for Best Animated Short Film at the 11th Academy Awards in 1939, but lost to Ferdinand the Bull, another short by Disney. In 1994, it was listed as the 26th greatest cartoon of all time by members of the animation field in a list compiled for the book The 50 Greatest Cartoons.

== Plot ==
As a king seeks a warrior to defeat a giant terrorizing his kingdom, a peasant tailor, Mickey Mouse, kills seven flies at once and boasts that he killed “seven with one blow”, causing everyone else to believe he has slain giants. The king summons Mickey, appoints him to kill the giant, and promises riches if he succeeds. Though initially fearful, Mickey accepts the task upon being additionally promised the hand of Princess Minnie.

When the giant appears, Mickey hides in a cart of pumpkins and is accidentally swallowed. He causes the giant to hiccup and escapes when the giant drinks from a well, then hides in some hay, but is discovered when the giant tries smoking it. Using his sewing skills to outwit and bind the giant, Mickey eventually causes him to fall and lose consciousness.

An amusement park is later built at the site, with its rides powered by the captive giant’s snores, and the newlywed Mickey and Minnie are shown riding the carousel.

== Adaptations ==
From August 28 to November 27, 1938, the Mickey Mouse comic strip published 14 Sunday newspaper comics retelling the story under the title The Brave Little Tailor. This version was bookended by segments showing the "real" Mickey Mouse as an actor who is cast by Walt Disney to appear in the film. The comic has Mac MacCorker as the fictional director of the short. Goofy also appears in these scenes and, after the wrap he is wearing the same clothes he wore in the short film The Whalers, which was released the month before Tailor. The story was written by Merrill De Maris and drawn by Manuel Gonzales and Floyd Gottfredson, with inking by Ted Thwaites.

In 1985, Bantam Books published a children's book called Mickey Meets the Giant which featured Mickey encountering the same giant as the one in this short. This version was somewhat more faithful to the original fairy tale, maintaining that the tailor fools the giant by apparently beating him in feats of strength.

== Home media ==
The short was released on December 4, 2001 as part of Walt Disney Treasures: Mickey Mouse in Living Color. It was also featured, along with A Knight for a Day, on DVD releases of The Sword in the Stone and was included in the 2018 Celebrating Mickey Blu-ray/DVD/Digital combo compilation and in the 2023 Mickey & Minnie: 10 Classic Shorts - Volume 1 Blu-ray/DVD/Digital combo compilation. The short is available to stream on Disney+, but it remains unrestored.

== See also ==
- Mickey Mouse (film series)
