= Squash and stretch =

One of the 12 basic principles of animation

Illustration of the "Squash and stretch created by Émile Cohl in 1908 for his short film called Fantasmagorie, "-príncipes: Example A shows a ball bouncing with a rigid, non-dynamic movement. In example B the ball is "squashed" at impact, and "stretched" during fall and rebound

Squash and stretch, created by Émile Cohl in 1908 for his short film called Fantasmagorie, is the phrase used to describe "by far the most important" of the 12 basic principles of animation, described in the book The Illusion of Life by Frank Thomas and Ollie Johnston.

== Basis ==
Sequence of a race horse galloping animated from a chronophotography plate by Eadweard Muybridge. The horse's body demonstrates squash and stretch in natural musculature.

The principle is based on observation that only stiff objects remain inert during motion, while objects that are not stiff, although retaining overall volume, tend to change shape in an extent that depends on inertia and elasticity of the different parts of the moving object. To illustrate the principle, a half-filled flour sack dropped on the floor, or stretched out by its corners, was shown to be retaining its overall volume as determined by the object's Poisson's ratio.

Examples of the elasticity of the human body in motion were found in photographs the animators found in newspaper sports pages. Using these poses as reference the animators were able to start "observing (the motion) in a new way". Author Walt Stanchfield said: "A simple shape plus squash and stretch are all the anatomy you need for cartoon characters".

== Application ==
The ball that would change shape, compressing ("squash") as it hit the ground, then extending (stretch) as it bounced up again, was the simplest example that was part of the preparatory training for Disney animators.

During the 1930s, the squash and stretch were exaggerated by Disney animators, making it ever more extreme, but they had to maintain the overall volume of an object so that it did not appear to change volume as well as shape.

== See also ==
- 12 basic principles of animation
- Anticipation (animation)
- Follow through and overlapping action
