= Creature animation =

Animation process

Creature animation is a specialised part of the animation process which involves bringing realistic animals and creatures to life. It is often distinguished from character animation, which involves breathing life into animated characters and creating the illusion of thought, feeling and emotion.

== Definition ==
Creature animators create highly realistic motion in animals or creatures; examples include the dinosaurs animated in the 1993 Steven Spielberg film Jurassic Park. Since dinosaurs cannot be filmed or observed in motion, the animators studied other living creatures such as birds and lizards in order to re-create how a dinosaur might move and behave.

Fours years earlier, in 1989, the pioneering digital animation studio Industrial Light & Magic created a water creature for the James Cameron film The Abyss. Again, not knowing how a water creature might move, considerable effort was required by the animators to imagine how such a creature might perform and behave.
