= Where the Toys Come From =

1983 film by Theodore Thomas

- Directed by: Theodore Thomas
- Written by: Theodore Thomas
- Produced by: Theodore Thomas; Paul Deason; Kuniko Okubo
- Starring: Larry Wright; Jon Harvey; Erin Young; Sab Shimono
- Music by: Akiko Yano
- Production companies: Walt Disney Productions; Theodore Thomas Productions
- Release date: December 3, 1983
- Running time: 58 minutes
- Country: United States
- Language: English

Where the Toys Come From is a 1983 special directed by Theodore Thomas and aired as part of Disney Studio Showcase series of specials on Disney Channel on December 3, 1983 and then released on video in November 1984.

== Plot ==
The movie follows the journey of two toys, named Zoom and Peepers, as they try to find out where they were made. Their owner, named Robin assists them in their journey. Their search begins in a toy museum, where they find out they were made in Japan. Robin takes them to the toy store they were purchased from and they begin their trip to Japan. In Japan, Zoom and Peepers find their maker, named Kenji and their questions are answered. Finally they magically return home, where they tell Robin about how they returned, and ask the new toys to be Robin's.

== Cast ==
Characters	Actors
Peepers	Jon Harvey
Zoom	Larry Wright
Robin	Erin Young
Kenji	Sab Shimono
