= Training film =

Educational film genre

Camouflage (1944) was a World War II training film that demonstrated camouflage techniques

A training film is a form of educational film – a short subject documentary movie, that provides an introduction to a topic. Both narrative documentary and dramatisation styles may be used, sometimes both in the same production. While most educational films were made to be used in schools, training films were made and used by the military, and civilian industry.

Countless training films were produced, in the days following the advent of sound film and before the beginnings of industrial video, that were a supplement (or sometimes the main course) to classroom or office training and education. Films were usually made with an eye toward current trends and viewpoints, and employed for years after production as long as the topic-specific concepts remained valid; consequently, many training films took on a quaintness or camp appeal, as time went on. (Excerpts from period films provide great insight into changing attitudes and values; the training movies tapped for The Atomic Café are just one example.)
