= Camouflage (1944 film) =

- Directed by: Frank Thomas
- Produced by: Walt Disney
- Production company: Walt Disney Studios
- Distributed by: U.S. War Department / RKO Radio Pictures
- Release date: 1944
- Running time: 20 minutes
- Country: United States
- Language: English

The Chameleon, "Now You See Him Now You Don't, Yehudi", the star of Camouflage (1944)

Camouflage is a 1944 American animated short film. It was produced by the First Motion Picture Unit, and was intended to train the United States Military in the use of camouflage against air-raids.

In the short, a chameleon called "Now You See Him Now You Don't, Yehudi" explains the basics of camouflage to a group of airmen between air raids by Japanese planes.

== See also ==
- Military camouflage
- Training film
