= Mickey's Circus =

1936 Mickey Mouse cartoon

- Directed by: Ben Sharpsteen
- Story by: Otto Englander; Walt Disney; Jack Kinney; Ted Sears
- Produced by: Walt Disney
- Starring: Walt Disney; Clarence Nash
- Music by: Paul J. Smith
- Animation by: Milt Kahl; Woolie Reitherman; Bernard Wolf; Frank Thomas; Fred Spencer; James Culhane; Frank Kelling; Don Patterson; Cy Young; Larry Clemmons; Jack Hannah; Chuck Couch; Dick Williams; Al Eugster; Eddie Strickland; James Algar; Marvin Woodward; John McManus; Milt Schaffer
- Color process: Technicolor
- Production company: Walt Disney Productions
- Distributed by: United Artists
- Release date: August 1, 1936
- Running time: 7 minutes (one reel)
- Country: United States
- Language: English

Mickey's Circus is an animated short film directed by Ben Sharpsteen and produced by Walt Disney Productions and released August 1, 1936. It was the 87th Mickey Mouse short film to be released, the eighth of that year.

Although the film is called Mickey's Circus, the film mostly features Donald Duck, but Mickey Mouse does feature in the beginning and end. Also featured are a trio of trained sea lions, a young sea lion pup, and an audience full of children.

== Plot ==
Mickey Mouse is hosting a circus featuring Donald Duck and a trio of sea lions. Children from all over come to see the circus. After Mickey introduces the performers, the show starts. Donald enters the ring only to be stampeded by the sea lions and a young sea lion pup. The first act is juggling, in which the sea lions and Donald juggle balls that land on their noses. When the stunt is finished, the sea lions beg to be fed, throwing their balls at Donald and pointing to their mouths. Before Donald can feed the last sea lion, the pup intervenes and steals the fish. The resulting tug-of-war ends in the sea lions fighting over the fish. The next act is playing the organ pipe, but the sea lion cannot do it right. The pup interferes again and plays the tune "Yankee Doodle" instead, but the crowd cheers anyway. The pup distracts Donald to the point where Donald loses his temper, tries to attack the pup, and gets stuck in a drum. To add insult to injury, the whole crowd starts imitating him. Donald regains control, however, by driving the sea lions away from the basket of fish with his pistol.

Subsequently, the sea lion refuses to perform, unless fed first. When Donald gets out a fish, the sea lion plays the tune rapidly, earning applause and prompting Donald to throw him a fish as a reward, but the sea lions fight over the fish again, destroying the organ pipe in the process. The pup steals the fish again and Donald chases; there follows a fast chase around the arena, which includes Donald chasing the pup through a cannon and Mickey attempting to intervene. The spectators fire the cannon, shooting Mickey and Donald out and resulting in Mickey landing on a tightrope and Donald hanging from a hook within the fish basket. When a spectator cuts Donald's basket loose, he falls, lands on a circus bike and shouts at Mickey to move out the way while ringing the bell frantically and cycling across the rope. The spectators oil the rope, causing Donald's bike to run backward and splatter Mickey, go over Mickey's pole, bounce back from the start, and end up on top of Mickey's pole. When the spectators throw a barrel at Mickey, Donald's bike is bounced off but Donald gets back by driving through thin air and Mickey is loaded on as well. The climax ensues when the spectators turn up the voltage to high, electrocuting Mickey and Donald and splitting the bike (and rope) in half, causing Mickey and Donald to fall. The two land in the seal tank, only to be hit by a fish thrown by the pup, and the film ends with the sea lions beating up Mickey and Donald as they fight over the fish in the tank.

== Production ==
In Hollywood Cartoons: American Animation in Its Golden Age, Michael Barrier discusses Mickey's Circus in a passage about stenographers' transcripts of Walt Disney in story meetings:

The value of such transcripts is evident from one of the earliest surviving examples, from an October 1935 meeting on a cartoon called Mickey's Circus; Mickey Mouse was to be the ringmaster and Donald Duck, the impresario of a troupe of seals. Disney steered the writers toward a presentation of the seals that would permit the animators to introduce personality. He said, in the stenographer's abbreviated version: "Only way to work those seals is as whole bunch of comics — they applaud themselves... [No tricky way that] they juggle balls is important unless it is part of some business you are building". Disney was concerned not just with personality, but with the danger of making a personality one-dimensional; of Donald Duck, he said, "You are depending too much on the idea of the Duck getting mad". The film itself, released the following year, suggests that the story men heeded Disney's wishes. In it, Donald resembles an exasperated schoolmaster, the seals, a mob of high-spirited, anarchic schoolboys. There are tongue-in-cheek echoes of the bitter labor disputes of the thirties, too: at one point, Donald addresses the seals as "You radicals!"

Although no animators were credited, it was reported that Milt Kahl, Woolie Reitherman, Bernard Wolf, Frank Thomas, Fred Spencer, James Culhane, Frank Kelling, Don Patterson, Cy Young, Larry Clemmons, Jack Hannah, Chuck Couch, Dick Williams, Al Eugster, Eddie Strickland, Jim Algar, Marvin Woodward, John McManus and Milt Schaffer have worked on this short. Emil Flohri and Carlos Manriquez are also noted to be the short's background artists.

== Voice cast ==
- Mickey Mouse: Walt Disney
- Donald Duck: Clarence Nash
- Salty the Seal: Pinto Colvig

== Home media ==
The short was released on December 4, 2001, on Walt Disney Treasures: Mickey Mouse in Living Color.

== See also ==
- List of Disney animated shorts
- Mickey Mouse (film series)
