= Frank and Ollie =

1995 documentary film about Frank Thomas and Ollie Johnston

- Theatrical release poster
- Directed by: Theodore Thomas
- Written by: Theodore Thomas
- Produced by: Kuniko Okubo; Theodore Thomas
- Starring: Frank Thomas; Ollie Johnston
- Cinematography: Erik Daarstad
- Edited by: Kathryn Camp
- Music by: John Reynolds
- Production companies: Walt Disney Pictures; Theodore Thomas Productions
- Distributed by: Buena Vista Pictures Distribution
- Release dates: January 22, 1995 (Sundance Film Festival); October 20, 1995 (U.S.)
- Running time: 89 minutes
- Country: United States
- Language: English

Frank and Ollie is a 1995 documentary film about the life and careers of Frank Thomas and Ollie Johnston, two chief animators who had worked at Walt Disney Animation Studios from its early years until their retirement in the late 1970s.

It was directed, produced and written by Theodore Thomas, Frank Thomas' son. A number of other figures in the animation business are also interviewed about Frank and Ollie's influence on modern animation, and about their personal friendship.

== Summary ==
The film primarily consists of Frank Thomas and Ollie Johnston's anecdotes of their careers as animators during their long tenure at Walt Disney Studios, beginning with their hiring a couple of years before the release of Snow White and the Seven Dwarfs. They talk about the successes and difficulties of the Walt Disney studios throughout their careers, including the production of Disney's early works such as Pinocchio and Fantasia, decrease in business due to World War II, the unexpected death of Walt Disney in 1966, and the importance of The Jungle Book's success in 1967. These anecdotes are punctuated by archival footage from various Disney films, as well as interviews with contemporary Disney animators, animation historians, and interviews with Frank and Ollie's wives. Footage of Frank and Ollie's daily lives at their nearby homes in La Cañada Flintridge, California is also featured.

Periodically in the film, Frank or Ollie (usually Ollie) will act out or describe a scene from a Disney film that they animated, and then show the scene from the film. This demonstrates the importance of acting in animation. Several of their anecdotes were also about how other animators did their scenes. The film also talks about Disney's Nine Old Men, the senior staff at Walt Disney Studios. Ollie Johnston's beloved model railroad and the book Disney Animation: The Illusion of Life, written by Frank Thomas and Ollie Johnston, also feature prominently in the film.

== Release ==
The film was first shown at the Sundance Film Festival in January, 1995, before gaining a limited theatrical release in October.

=== Home media ===
The film received a limited theatrical and VHS release. However, in 2003, the film was released on a Special Edition DVD, including such features as commentary, 5.1 Dolby Digital Surround Sound, a behind-the-scenes featurette, footage of Frank and Ollie's very first animations made at Disney, and some of Frank and Ollie's home movies as well as some scenes of Ollie's live steam train, excerpted from a Disney TV show.

=== Streaming ===
Frank and Ollie is currently available to watch on-demand via Disney+.

== Reception ==
Reviews were generally positive; the film holds a score of 88% on Rotten Tomatoes.
