= Pose-to-pose animation =

Animation terminology

Three key poses for an animated movement, with intermediate frames added afterwards

Pose to pose is a term used in animation for creating key poses for characters and then inbetweening them in intermediate frames to make the character appear to move from one pose to the next. Pose-to-pose is used in traditional animation as well as computer-based 3D animation. The opposite concept is straight-ahead animation, where the poses of a scene are not planned, which results in more loose and free animation, though with less control over its timing.

== See also ==
- Blocking (animation)
