= Cinderella (1950 film) =

1950 Disney animated film

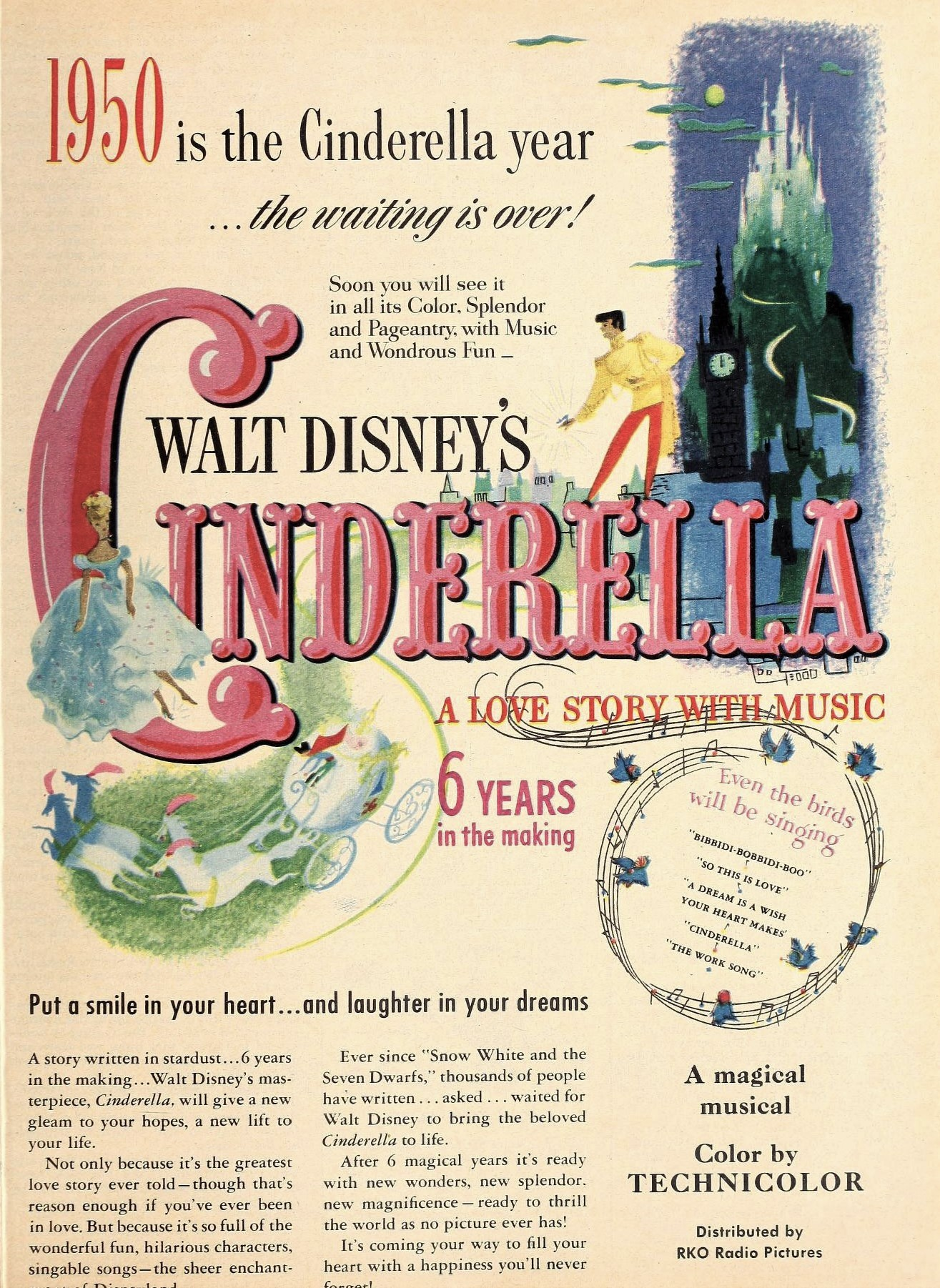
- 1950 print advertisement
- Directed by: Wilfred Jackson; Hamilton Luske; Clyde Geronimi
- Story by: William Peet; Ted Sears; Homer Brightman; Kenneth Anderson; Erdman Penner; Winston Hibler; Harry Reeves; Joe Rinaldi
- Based on: "Cinderella" by Charles Perrault
- Produced by: Walt Disney
- Starring: Ilene Woods; Eleanor Audley; Verna Felton; Rhoda Williams; James MacDonald; Luis van Rooten
- Edited by: Donald Halliday
- Music by: Oliver Wallace; Paul Smith
- Production company: Walt Disney Productions
- Distributed by: RKO Radio Pictures
- Release dates: February 15, 1950 (Boston); March 4, 1950 (United States)
- Running time: 74 minutes
- Country: United States
- Language: English
- Budget: $2.2 million
- Box office: $182 million

Cinderella is a 1950 American animated musical fantasy film produced by Walt Disney Productions and released by RKO Radio Pictures. Based on Charles Perrault's 1697 fairy tale, the film follows Cinderella, the daughter of a widowed aristocrat, who is forced to become a servant of her cruel stepmother and two stepsisters, until Cinderella's fairy godmother grants her the chance to attend the royal ball and meet the prince. The production was supervised by Ben Sharpsteen, and was directed by Wilfred Jackson, Hamilton Luske, and Clyde Geronimi. It features the voices of Ilene Woods, Eleanor Audley, Verna Felton, Rhoda Williams, June Foray, James MacDonald, and Luis van Rooten.

During the early 1940s, Walt Disney Productions had suffered financially after losing connections to the European film markets due to the outbreak of World War II. Because of this, the studio endured commercial failures such as Pinocchio, Fantasia (both 1940) and Bambi (1942), all of which later became more successful with several re-releases in theaters and on home video. By 1947, the studio was over $4 million in debt and was on the verge of bankruptcy. Walt Disney and his animators returned to feature film production in 1948 after producing a string of package films with the idea of adapting Charles Perrault's Cendrillon into an animated film.

Cinderella was released to theatres on February 15, 1950. It received critical acclaim and was a box office success, making it Disney's biggest hit since Snow White and the Seven Dwarfs (1937) and helping reverse the studio's fortunes. It also received three Academy Award nominations, including Best Scoring of a Musical Picture, Best Sound Recording, and Best Original Song for "Bibbidi-Bobbidi-Boo".

The film was followed by two direct-to-video sequels, Cinderella II: Dreams Come True (2002) and Cinderella III: A Twist in Time (2007), and a live-action remake in 2015. In 2018, Cinderella was selected for preservation in the United States National Film Registry by the Library of Congress as being "culturally, historically, or aesthetically significant".

== Plot ==
In 19th century France, Cinderella is the daughter of a widowed aristocrat living in the small but prosperous French kingdom. When she is a child, her father remarries Lady Tremaine, a cold-hearted widow with two daughters of her own, Drizella and Anastasia, but dies shortly after. Jealous of Cinderella's charm, Lady Tremaine and her daughters abuse her and eventually force her to become a scullion in her own château. As the years pass, Cinderella remains kind and gentle, obediently doing her chores. She also makes friends with the mice and birds that live in the château, specially two mice named Jaq and Gus, and takes care of them, while protecting them from her stepmother's pet cat, Lucifer.

One day, the King invites all the eligible maidens in the kingdom to a royal ball, hoping that his son, the Prince, will choose one of them as a bride. Wanting to attend, Cinderella finds a dress of her late mother's to fix up. Fearing she will upstage them at the ball, Lady Tremaine and the stepsisters deliberately keep her busy with no time to spare. Jaq, Gus, and the other animals decide to fix up the dress for Cinderella, using beads and a sash discarded by the stepsisters. However, when Cinderella attempts to go to the ball with her family, the stepsisters are upset when they recognize their belongings and angrily tear the dress apart, before leaving Cinderella behind. A distraught Cinderella runs out to the garden in tears, where she is met by the Fairy Godmother, who has come to help. She transforms a pumpkin into a carriage, Jaq, Gus, and two other mice into horses, Cinderella's horse Major into a coachman, and her bloodhound Bruno into a footman. The fairy godmother also bestows Cinderella a shimmering silver ball gown and glass slippers, but warns her that all the magic will end on the stroke of midnight.

Cinderella arrives at the ball, unrecognized by the stepsisters, although Lady Tremaine believes something is familiar about her. The prince is instantly smitten, so the King orders the Grand Duke to make sure the romance goes without a hitch. The duke prevents anyone from interfering as Cinderella and the Prince dance a waltz and wander out to the palace grounds, falling deeper in love. However, when Cinderella hears the clock tolling midnight, she runs away before she and the Prince can exchange names. Despite the efforts of the Grand Duke, Cinderella flees the palace, losing one of her glass slippers on the staircase. The palace guards pursue, but when the magic ends on the stroke of 12, Cinderella and the animals revert to their former appearances and hide in the woods. Cinderella discovers the other glass slipper is still on her foot, and takes it home with her.

The Prince promises he will marry none but the girl who fits the glass slipper. The King orders the Grand Duke to try the shoe on every girl in the kingdom until he finds a match. When the news reaches the château, Cinderella is shocked to realize it was the Prince she met. Hearing Cinderella humming the waltz from the ball, Lady Tremaine realizes the truth and locks Cinderella in her attic bedroom. While the stepsisters unsuccessfully try on the slipper, Jaq and Gus steal the key back from Lady Tremaine and take it to Cinderella. Lucifer attempts to stop them by trapping Gus and the key beneath a bowl and battling the other mice, but the birds summon Bruno who scares him out of the house. Lucifer jumps out of the tower window to escape from Bruno, and a freed Cinderella hurries to meet the Grand Duke. In a last effort to prevent Cinderella from overshadowing her daughters, Lady Tremaine deliberately causes the Grand Duke's footman to trip and break the glass slipper. Cinderella reveals she has the other slipper, much to Lady Tremaine's shock, which the Grand Duke places on her foot. Cinderella and the Prince are married, and share a kiss as they set off in a carriage and leave for their honeymoon and she becomes the princess.

== Voice cast ==
- Ilene Woods as Cinderella, a well-meaning, hard-working young woman who is reduced to being a servant by her stepmother and stepsisters
- Eleanor Audley as Lady Tremaine, Cinderella's cruel and conniving stepmother who envies her charm
- Verna Felton as the Fairy Godmother, an endearing but slightly addled matron who enables Cinderella to attend the ball
- Rhoda Williams and Lucille Bliss as Drizella and Anastasia Tremaine, Lady Tremaine's spoiled and awkward daughters and Cinderella's stepsisters (Note: Uncredited for Drizella.)
- James MacDonald and Candy Candido (uncredited) as Jaq and Gus, Cinderella's anthropomorphic mice friends who help her with her chores (Note: Uncredited for Gus.)
  - MacDonald also voiced Bruno, Cinderella's pet dog, with Earl Keen providing additional vocal effects. (Note: Uncredited.)
- Luis van Rooten as the King, the Prince's loud and short-tempered father who wants his son to get married and have children
  - Van Rooten also voiced the Grand Duke, the King's fussy majordomo and confidant
- William Phipps as Prince Charming, the King's son and Cinderella's love interest (Note: Uncredited.)
  - Mike Douglas as Prince Charming's singing voice (Note: Uncredited.)
- Marion Darlington and Clarence Nash as Cinderella's bird friends (Note: Uncredited.)
- June Foray as Lucifer, Lady Tremaine's cat who messes up Cinderella's work and chases after her mice friends (Note: Uncredited.)
- Don Barclay as the Doorman, a servant of the King (Note: Uncredited.)

Betty Lou Gerson was the uncredited narrator in the prologue. Lucille Williams, Thurl Ravenscroft, Clint McCauley, June Sullivan and Helen Seibert provided uncredited voices for Perla and the other mice. John Woodbury and Larry Grey provided uncredited additional voices.

== Production ==
=== Story development ===
Walt Disney first adapted Charles Perrault's 1697 fairy tale "Cinderella" as part of his cartoon shorts series for the Laugh-O-Gram Studio in 1922. He was interested in producing a second version in December 1933 as a Silly Symphony short; Burt Gillett was attached as the director while Frank Churchill was assigned as the composer. A story outline included "white mice and birds" as Cinderella's playmates. To expand the story, storyboard artists suggested visual gags, some of which ended up in the final film. However, by early 1938, the story proved to be too complicated to be condensed into a short so it was suggested as a potential animated feature film, beginning with a fourteen-page outline written by Al Perkins.

In 1940, a second treatment was written by Dana Cofy and Bianca Majolie, in which Cinderella's stepmother was named Florimel de la Pochel; her stepsisters as Wanda and Javotte; her pet mouse Dusty and pet turtle Clarissa; the stepsisters' cat Bon Bon; the Prince's aide Spink, and the stepsisters' dancing instructor Monsieur Carnewal. This version stuck closely to the original fairy tale until Cinderella arrives home late from the second ball. Her stepfamily then imprisons Cinderella in a dungeon cellar. When Spink and his troops arrive at the la Pochel residence, Dusty takes the slipper and leads them to free Cinderella.

By September 1943, Disney had assigned Dick Huemer and Joe Grant to begin work on Cinderella as story supervisors and given a preliminary budget of $1 million. However, by 1945, their preliminary story work was halted. During the writing stages of Song of the South (1946), Dalton S. Reymond and Maurice Rapf quarreled, and Rapf was reassigned to work on Cinderella. In his version, Cinderella was written to be a less passive character than Snow White, and more rebellious against her stepfamily. Rapf explained, "My thinking was you can't have somebody who comes in and changes everything for you. You can't be delivered on a platter. You've got to earn it. So in my version, the Fairy Godmother said, 'It's okay till midnight but from then on it's up to you.' I made her earn it, and what she had to do to achieve it was to rebel against her stepmother and stepsisters, to stop being a slave in her own home. So I had a scene where they're ordering her around and she throws the stuff back at them. She revolts, so they lock her up in the attic. I don't think anyone took (my idea) very seriously."

In spring 1946, Disney held three story meetings, and subsequently received treatment from Ted Sears, Homer Brightman, and Harry Reeves dated March 24, 1947. In the treatment, the Prince was introduced earlier in the story reminiscent of Snow White and the Seven Dwarfs (1937), and there was a hint of the cat-and-mouse conflict. By May 1947, the first rough phase of storyboarding was in the process, and an inventory report that same month suggested a different approach with the story "largely through the animals in the barnyard and their observations of Cinderella's day-to-day activities".

After the release of Fun and Fancy Free (1947), Walt Disney Productions' bank debt declined from $4.2 million to $3 million. Around this time, Disney acknowledged the need for sound economic policies but emphasized to the loaners that slashing production would be suicidal. To restore the studio to full financial health, he expressed his desire to return to producing full-length animated films. However, Walt's brother Roy O. Disney was reluctant to greenlight another film and asked Walt to consider selling the studio and retiring with the money they had. After arguing for weeks, Roy eventually conceded and allowed a new feature-length animated film to be made. By then, three animated projects—Cinderella, Alice in Wonderland (1951), and Peter Pan (1953)—were in development. Disney felt the characters in Alice in Wonderland and Peter Pan were too cold, while Cinderella contained elements similar to Snow White, and greenlit the project. Selecting his top-tier animation talent, Ben Sharpsteen was assigned as supervising producer while Hamilton Luske, Wilfred Jackson, and Clyde Geronimi became the sequence directors. Nevertheless, production on Alice resumed so that both animation crews would effectively compete against each other to see which film would finish first.

By early 1948, Cinderella had progressed further than Alice in Wonderland, and was fast-tracked to become the first full-length animated film since Bambi (1942). During a story meeting on January 15, 1948, the cat-and-mouse sequences began to grow into an important element in the film so much that Disney placed veteran story artist Bill Peet in charge of the cat-and-mouse segments.

By the late 1940s, Disney's involvement during production had shrunken noticeably. As he was occupied with trains and the filming of Treasure Island (1950), the directors were left to exercise their own judgment more on details. Although Disney no longer held daily story meetings, the three directors still communicated with him by mailing him memoranda, scripts, Photostats of storyboards, and acetates of soundtrack recordings while he was in England for two and a half months during the summer of 1949. When Disney did not respond, work resumed and then had to be undone when he did. In one instance, when Disney returned to the studio on August 29, he reviewed Luske's animation sequences and ordered numerous minor changes, as well as a significant reworking of the film's climax. Production was finished by October 13, 1949.

=== Casting ===
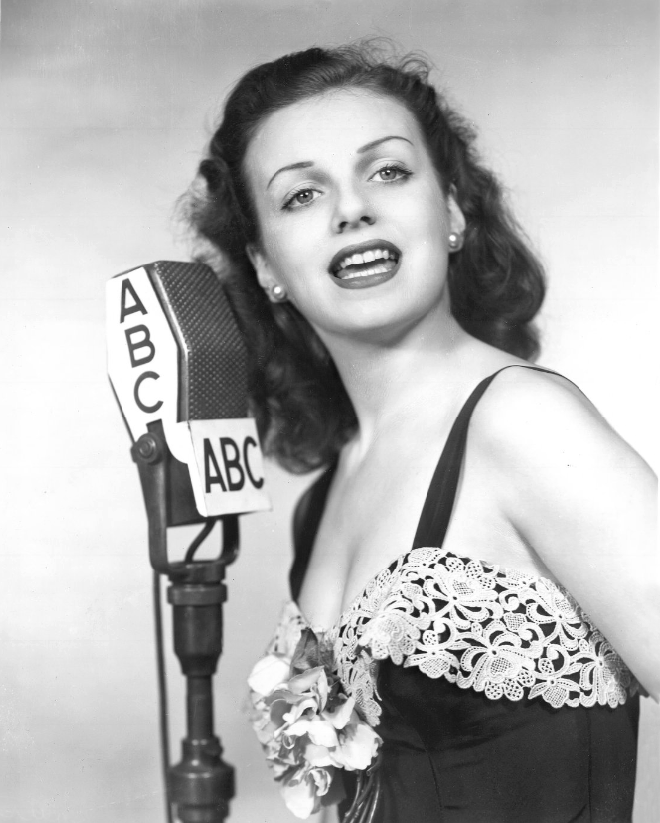
Ilene Woods, who provided the voice of Cinderella.

Nearly 380 applicants were auditioned for the role of Cinderella. In March 1948, The Hollywood Reporter announced that singer Jeannie McKeon had been signed to voice the character, but eventually the deal did not work out. That same month, Ilene Woods announced on national radio that she had been cast as Cinderella. She got involved with the project when she did a favor to its songwriters Mack David and Jerry Livingston, who had known Woods from working with her on her eponymous ABC radio program. They asked Woods to sing on demo recordings of several songs they had written for the film, which were then presented to Walt Disney. Two days later, Woods received a telephone call from Disney, with whom she immediately scheduled an interview. Woods recalled in an interview with the Los Angeles Times, "We met and talked for a while, and he said, 'How would you like to be Cinderella?'," to which she agreed.

For the role of Lucifer, a studio representative asked June Foray if she could provide the voice of a cat. "Well, I could do anything," recalled Foray, "So he hired me as Lucifer the cat in Cinderella".

=== Animation ===
==== Live-action reference ====
Walt [Disney] insisted we plan Cinderella more carefully than prior films. We shot it all in live-action first, so that we could evaluate it, because we couldn't afford to make changes in the animation. The animation had to be right the first time. The live-action was done without costumes or set. We'd work on a lonely soundstage to see whether the scenes were going to work. Would they be too long? Too short? Will it hold your interest?

— Frank Thomas, on using the live-action reference in Cinderella

By the spring of 1948, actors were filmed on large soundstages, in which they performed to a playback of the dialogue soundtrack. Disney had previously used live-action reference on Snow White and the Seven Dwarfs (1937), Pinocchio (1940), and Fantasia (1940), but as part of an effort to keep the production cost down, the footage was used to check the plot, timing, and movement of the characters before animating it. The footage was then edited frame-by-frame onto large Photostat sheets to duplicate, in which the animators found too restrictive as they were not allowed to imagine anything that the live actors did not present since that kind of experimentation might necessitate changes and cost more money. Additionally, the animators were instructed to draw from a certain directorial perspective to avoid difficult shots and angles. Frank Thomas explained, "Anytime you'd think of another way of staging the scene, they'd say: 'We can't get the camera up there'! Well, you could get the animation camera up there! So you had to go with what worked well in live-action."

Walt Disney hired actress Helene Stanley to perform the live-action reference for Cinderella, allowing artists to draw animated frames based on the movements of the actress. She later did the same kind of work for the characters of Princess Aurora in Sleeping Beauty (1959) and Anita Radcliffe in One Hundred and One Dalmatians (1961). Animators modeled Prince Charming on actor Jeffrey Stone, who also provided some additional voices for the film. Claire Du Brey served as the live-action reference for the Fairy Godmother, although the design for the character was based on Mary Alice O'Connor (the wife of layout artist Ken O'Connor).

==== Character animation ====
By 1950, the animation board, which had been established as early as 1940 to help with the management of the animation department, had settled down to nine supervising animators, including Frank Thomas, Ollie Johnston, Les Clark, Wolfgang Reitherman, Eric Larson, Ward Kimball, Milt Kahl, John Lounsbery, and Marc Davis. Although they were still in their thirties, they were jokingly referred by Disney as the "Nine Old Men" after President Franklin D. Roosevelt's denigration of the Supreme Court.

Walt Disney referred to Cinderella's dress transformation, animated by Marc Davis, as his favorite piece of animation.

Eric Larson and Marc Davis were both tasked with designing and animating Cinderella. Larson was the first to animate the character whom he envisioned as a "sixteen-year-old with braids and a pug nose". However, Disney grew displeased with this approach and assigned Davis as the second supervising animator, whose designs suggested a "more the exotic dame" with a long swan-like neck. To minimize the differences and set the final design, Disney assigned animator Ken O'Brien who, as Larson said, made "his gals and Marc's gals look like the same gal." Due to the extensive use of the live-action reference for the film, Helene Stanley's physical features also influenced the character's final appearance.

Frank Thomas was assigned as the supervising animator of Lady Tremaine, which he was "astounded" with, since he had previously mainly specialized in more "charming" characters, like Pinocchio or Bambi.

Milt Kahl was the directing animator of the Fairy Godmother, the King, and the Grand Duke. Originally, Disney intended for the Fairy Godmother to be a tall, regal character as he viewed fairies as tall, motherly figures (as seen in the Blue Fairy in the 1940 film Pinocchio), but Kahl disagreed with this characterization. After Verna Felton was cast, Kahl managed to convince Disney of his undignified concept of the Fairy Godmother.

Unlike the human characters, the animal characters were animated without live-action reference. During production, none of Kimball's designs for Lucifer had pleased Disney. After visiting Kimball's steam train at his home, Disney saw his calico cat and remarked, "Hey—there's your model for Lucifer". Reitherman animated the sequence in which Jaq and Gus laboriously drag the key up the flight of stairs to Cinderella.

== Music ==
The original songs were written and composed by Tin Pan Alley songwriters Mack David, Jerry Livingston, and Al Hoffman, who had written six songs for the film by March 1949. Oliver Wallace and Paul Smith composed the score. A soundtrack was not issued during the initial release in 1950. Walt Disney Records later issued the official soundtrack on CD and audio cassette on February 4, 1997. A collector's edition soundtrack was reissued on October 2, 2012, and consisted of several lost chords and new recordings of them. In conjunction with the film's 65th anniversary and the release of its live-action remake, the soundtrack for Cinderella was re-released in 2015 as part of the Legacy Collection.

=== Songs ===
Original songs performed in the film include:

No.	Title	Performer(s)	Length
1.	"Cinderella (Main Title)"	Marni Nixon & The Jud Conlon Chorus
2.	"A Dream Is a Wish Your Heart Makes"	Ilene Woods
3.	"Oh, Sing Sweet Nightingale"	Ilene Woods
4.	"The Work Song"	Jimmy MacDonald & Chorus
5.	"Bibbidi-Bobbidi-Boo"	Verna Felton
6.	"So This Is Love"	Ilene Woods & Mike Douglas

== Release ==
The film was originally released in theaters on February 15, 1950, in Boston, Massachusetts. It also screened at the inaugural edition of the Berlin International Film Festival in June 1951, where it won the Golden Bear for Best Music Film. Cinderella was re-released in 1957, 1965, 1973, 1981 and 1987. Cinderella also played a limited engagement in select Cinemark Theatres from February 16–18, 2013. To celebrate Disney's 100th anniversary, the film was re-released in cinemas across the UK from August 25 to 31, 2023, and Latin American theaters from October 12 to 18, 2023, alongside Toy Story (1995).

=== Box office ===
The film was Disney's greatest box office success since Snow White and the Seven Dwarfs, earning nearly $4.28 million in distributor rentals (the distributor's share of the box office gross) from the United States and Canada. It was the fifth highest-grossing film released in North America in 1950. It was the fifth most popular movie at the British box office in 1951. The film is France's sixteenth biggest film of all time in terms of admissions with 13.2 million tickets sold.

The success of Cinderella allowed Disney to carry on producing films throughout the 1950s by which the profits from the film's release, with the additional profits from record sales, music publishing, publications, and other merchandise gave Disney the cash flow to finance a slate of productions (animated and live-action), establish his own distribution company, enter television production, and begin building Disneyland during the decade, as well as developing the Florida Project, later known as Walt Disney World.

Cinderella has had a lifetime domestic gross of $93 million, and a lifetime worldwide gross of $182 million across its original release and several reissues. Adjusted for inflation, and incorporating subsequent releases, the film has had a lifetime gross of $565 million.

=== Home media ===
Cinderella was released on VHS and LaserDisc on October 4, 1988, as part of the Walt Disney Classics collection. The release had a promotion with a free lithograph reproduction for those who pre-ordered the video before its release date. Disney had initially shipped 4.3 million VHS copies to retailers, but due to strong consumer demand, more than seven million copies were shipped. At the time of its initial home video release, it was the best-selling VHS title until it was overtaken by E.T. the Extra-Terrestrial (1982). The VHS release was placed into moratorium (i.e., into the Disney Vault) on April 30, 1989, with 7.2 million copies sold and having grossed $108 million in sales revenue.

On October 4, 1995, a digitally remastered edition of film was released on VHS and LaserDisc as part of the "Walt Disney Masterpiece Collection", and later in the UK on November 24, 1997. Both editions were accompanied by "The Making of Cinderella" featurette. A Deluxe LaserDisc included the featurette, an illustrated, hardcover book retelling the story with pencil tests and conceptual art from the film, and a reprint of the film's artwork. Disney shipped more than 15 million VHS copies, of which 8 million were sold in the first month.

On October 4, 2005, Disney released the film on DVD with a digitally remastered transfer. This release was the sixth installment of the Walt Disney Platinum Editions series. According to Home Media Magazine, Disney sold 3.2 million copies in its first week, which earned over $64 million in sales. The Platinum Edition was also released on VHS, but the only special feature was the "A Dream Is a Wish Your Heart Makes" music video by the Disney Channel Circle of Stars. The Platinum Edition DVD, along with the sequels to the film, went into the Disney Vault on January 31, 2008. In the United Kingdom and Ireland, a "Royal Edition" of Cinderella was released on DVD on April 4, 2011, to commemorate the UK Royal Wedding of Prince William and Catherine Middleton. This release had a unique limited edition number on every slipcase and an exclusive art card.

On October 2, 2012, a 3-disc Blu-ray/DVD/Digital Copy Combo Diamond Edition was released. The Diamond Edition release also included a 2-disc Blu-ray/DVD combo and a 6-disc "Jewelry Box Set" that included the first film alongside both its sequels. A 1-disc DVD edition was released on November 20, 2012. The Diamond Edition release went back into the Disney Vault on January 31, 2017.

Cinderella was re-released on HD digital download on June 18, 2019, with a physical media re-release on Blu-ray on June 25, 2019, as part of the Walt Disney Signature Collection commemorating the film's 70th anniversary.

On March 18, 2023, Cinderella was re-released on 4K Ultra HD as a Disney Movie Club exclusive, with a SteelBook packaging release on August 1 as well as a standard release on October 17 as part of the Disney100 promotion. It utilized the 4K remastered print from the 2023 Berlin International Film Festival screening, marking it as the first animated film made during the studio's "golden era" to receive this treatment. The 4K version, dubbed as the "Ultimate Restoration," began streaming on Disney+ on August 25.

=== 2023 4K restoration ===
A 4K remastered version of the film premiered at the 73rd Berlin International Film Festival on February 19, 2023, to celebrate the 100th anniversary of the Walt Disney Company. The restoration was described as a "multi-year effort" involving Disney's Restoration and Preservation team and key members of Walt Disney Animation Studios, including Eric Goldberg, Michael Giaimo, Dorothy McKim, and Bob Bagley. It involved obtaining the original 35mm Technicolor negative from the Library of Congress and re-scanning it in 4K resolution, with dirt digitally removed frame by frame to bring the film back "to its original grandeur, authentic to the artistic ambitions of the Studio's creative team, and which looks and sounds better than ever." The 4K version began streaming on Disney+ on August 25, 2023.

== Reception ==
=== Critical response ===
Upon release, Cinderella received widespread acclaim from critics, who praised its animation, visuals, music, and story. The film garnered the best reception for a Disney animated film since Dumbo; some critics declared it Disney's first artistic triumph since Snow White and the Seven Dwarfs, to which the film was heavily compared in reviews. In a personal letter to Walt Disney, director Michael Curtiz hailed the film as the "masterpiece of all pictures you have done." Producer Hal Wallis declared, "If this is not your best, it is very close to the top." A review in Chicago Tribune remarked: "The film not only is handsome, with imaginative art and glowing colors to bedeck the old fairy tale, but it also is told gently, without the lurid villains which sometimes give little tots nightmares. It is enhanced by the sudden, piquant touches of humor and the music which appeal to old and young." Time magazine wrote that "Cinderella is beguiling proof that Walt Disney knows his way around fairyland. Harking back to the style of Snow White and the Seven Dwarfs (1937), a small army of Disney craftsmen have given the centuries-old Cinderella story a dewy radiance of comic verve that should make children feel like elves and adults feel like children."

However, the characterization of Cinderella was met with mixed reviews. Bosley Crowther of The New York Times wrote, "The beautiful Cinderella has a voluptuous face and form—not to mention an eager disposition—to compare with Al Capp's Daisy Mae." However, criticizing her role and personality, Crowther opined, "As a consequence, the situation in which they are mutually involved have the constraint and immobility of panel-expressed episodes. When Mr. Disney tries to make them behave like human beings, they're banal." Similarly, Variety claimed the film found "more success in projecting the lower animals than in its central character, Cinderella, who is on the colorless, doll-faced side, as is the Prince Charming." Empire Magazine gave the film 4 stars out of 5, and said "Yes, it's beautiful, and yes, it's classic. But it's also got rather a bland pair of lead characters. That said, it's still enjoyable family entertainment, and shall remain forever so."

Retrospective reviews have remained positive. Roger Ebert of the Chicago Sun-Times awarded the film three out of four stars during its 1987 re-release. Jonathan Rosenbaum of the Chicago Reader wrote the film "shows Disney at the tail end of his best period, when his backgrounds were still luminous with depth and detail and his incidental characters still had range and bite." On the review aggregator website Rotten Tomatoes, 95% of 38 critics' reviews are positive, with an average rating of 8.3/10. The website's consensus reads: "The rich colors, sweet songs, adorable mice and endearing (if suffering) heroine make Cinderella a nostalgically lovely charmer." Metacritic, which uses a weighted average, assigned the film a score of 85 out of 100, based on 15 critics, indicating "universal acclaim".

=== Accolades ===
Award	Category	Nominee(s)	Result
Academy Awards	Best Scoring of a Musical Picture	Oliver Wallace and Paul Smith	Nominated
Academy Awards	Best Original Song	"Bibbidi-Bobbidi-Boo"; Music and Lyrics by Mack David, Al Hoffman and Jerry Livingston	Nominated
Academy Awards	Best Sound Recording	C. O. Slyfield	Nominated
Berlin International Film Festival	Golden Bear (Best Music Film)	Wilfred Jackson	Won
Berlin International Film Festival	Large Bronze Plate (Audience Vote)		Won
Hugo Awards	Best Dramatic Presentation	Clyde Geronimi, Wilfred Jackson, Hamilton Luske, Ken Anderson, Homer Brightman, Winston Hibler, Bill Peet, Erdman Penner, Harry Reeves, Joe Rinaldi and Ted Sears and Charles Perrault	Nominated
National Film Preservation Board	National Film Registry		Inducted
Satellite Awards	Outstanding Youth DVD		Nominated
Venice International Film Festival	Golden Lion	Clyde Geronimi, Hamilton Luske and Wilfred Jackson	Nominated
Venice International Film Festival	Special Jury Prize	Walt Disney	Won
Young Artist Awards	Former Child Star Life Achievement Award	Lucille Bliss	Won

In June 2008, the American Film Institute revealed its "10 Top 10"— the best ten films in ten "classic" American film genres—after polling over 1,500 people from the creative community. Cinderella was acknowledged as the 9th greatest film in the animation genre.

== Cultural impact and legacy ==
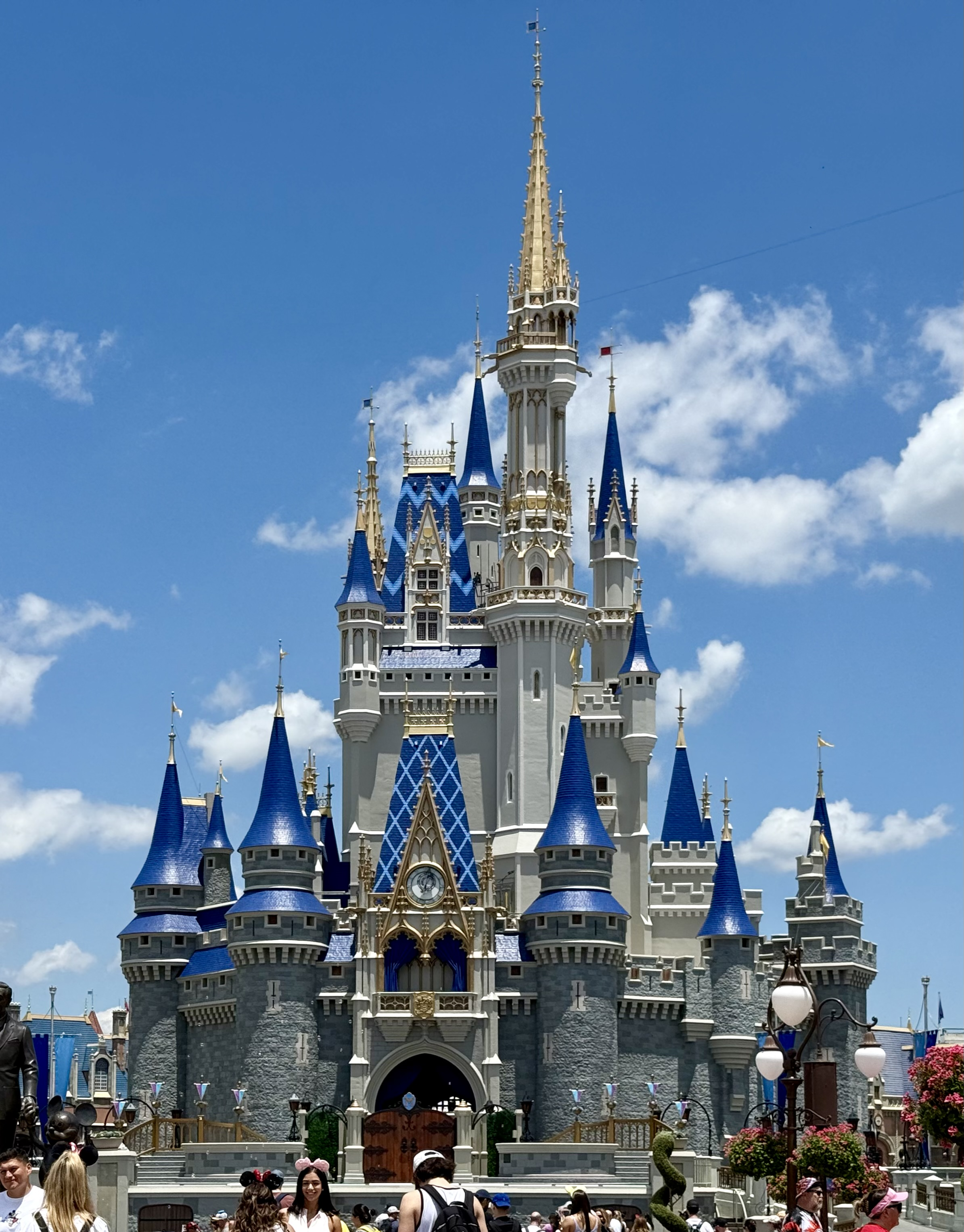
Cinderella Castle at Walt Disney World.

According to animation historian Charles Solomon, Cinderella "remains one of the most popular animated features in the Disney canon". In 2023, Ben Mankiewicz, host of Turner Classic Movies (TCM), told Parade magazine, "Disney was on the ropes. Cinderella saved Disney." He also said, "It has everything you want in a princess story, and it's done in this authentic, beautiful way."

Cinderella is referred by many as one of the most recognizable tales in history. Parade magazine listed the film among the greatest animated films of all time. In 2008, American Film Institute ranked Cinderella as the ninth best animated film of all time, writing: "one of the most recognizable fairytale stories ever, Cinderella has stood the test of time."

=== Appearances in other media ===
- A direct-to-video sequel Cinderella II: Dreams Come True was released in 2002.
- A second direct-to-video sequel Cinderella III: A Twist in Time was released in 2007.
- Several characters from the film have appeared as guests in House of Mouse, Mickey's Magical Christmas and Mickey's House of Villains.
- Cinderella and the Fairy Godmother appear in Kingdom Hearts. A world based on the film, known as Castle of Dreams, as well many characters, appear in Kingdom Hearts Birth by Sleep and Kingdom Hearts χ. The Fairy Godmother returns in the Kingdom Hearts III DLC Re Mind and Kingdom Hearts: Melody of Memory.
- A scaled-down stage musical version known as Disney's Cinderella KIDS is frequently performed by schools and children's theaters.
- A live-action adaptation of the film produced by Walt Disney Pictures, directed by Kenneth Branagh, was released in 2015—the year of the film's 65th anniversary of its release; starring Lily James, Richard Madden, Cate Blanchett, and Helena Bonham Carter.
- The Fairy Godmother (Melanie Paxson) appears in the Descendants franchise, with Lady Tremaine (Linda Ko) briefly shown in Descendants 3, and Cinderella (Brandy Norwood) and Prince Charming (Paolo Montalban) appearing in Descendants: The Rise of Red. In the latter film, Morgan Dudley, Tristan Padi and Grace Narducci play the teen version of Cinderella, Prince Charming and the Fairy Godmother, respectively.
- Some characters of the film appear as playable characters in the video game Disney Magic Kingdoms.
- Cinderella, Jaq and Gus have guest appearances in the 2018 film Ralph Breaks the Internet.
- The film was featured in King Richard.
- Like other Walt Disney Animation Studios characters, the characters from Cinderella have cameo appearances in the short film Once Upon a Studio (2023).

== See also ==
- List of animated feature films of the 1950s
- List of Disney animated films based on fairy tales
- List of Disney theatrical animated feature films

== Bibliography ==
- Barrier, Michael (1999). Hollywood Cartoons: American Animation in Its Golden Age. Oxford University Press. ISBN 978-0-1980-2079-0.
- Barrier, Michael (2007). The Animated Man: A Life of Walt Disney. University of California Press. ISBN 978-0-5202-5619-4.
- Beck, Jerry (2005). The Animated Movie Guide. Chicago Review Press. ISBN 978-1-5565-2591-9.
- Bohn, James (2017). Music in Disney's Animated Features: Snow White and the Seven Dwarfs to The Jungle Book. University Press of Mississippi. ISBN 978-1-4968-1215-5.
- Canemaker, John (2001). Walt Disney's Nine Old Men and the Art of Animation. Disney Editions. ISBN 978-0-7868-6496-6.
- Dakin, Glenn; Saxon, Victoria (2020). Disney Villains The Essential Guide New Edition. DK Publishing. ISBN 978-0-7440-3483-7.
- Deja, Andreas (2015). The Nine Old Men: Lessons, Techniques, and Inspiration from Disney's Great Animators. Routledge. ISBN 978-1-1350-1586-2.
- Gabler, Neal (2006). Walt Disney: The Triumph of the American Imagination. Vintage Books. ISBN 978-0-6797-5747-4.
- Koenig, David (1997). Mouse Under Glass: Secrets of Disney Animation & Theme Parks. Bonaventure Press. ISBN 978-0-9640-6051-7.
- Maltin, Leonard (1995). The Disney Films. Disney Editions. ISBN 978-0-7868-8527-5.
- Pitts, Michael R. (2015). RKO Radio Pictures Horror, Science Fiction and Fantasy Films, 1929-1956. McFarland & Company. ISBN 978-0-786-46047-2.
- Saxon, Victoria (2019). Disney Princess The Essential Guide New Edition. DK Publishing. ISBN 978-1-4654-9875-5.
- Sergi, Joe (2015). The Law for Comic Book Creators: Essential Concepts and Applications. Jefferson, North Carolina: McFarland & Company. ISBN 978-1-4766-1733-6. OCLC 903489229.
- Solomon, Charles (2015). A Wish Your Heart Makes: From the Grimm Brothers' Aschenputtel to Disney's Cinderella. Disney Editions. ISBN 978-1-4847-1326-6.
- Thomas, Bob (1994). Walt Disney: An American Original. Hyperion Press. ISBN 0-7868-6027-8.
- Thomas, Frank; Johnston, Ollie (1981). The Illusion of Life: Disney Animation. Abbeville Press. ISBN 978-0-7868-6070-8.
- Zemler, Emily (2022). Disney Princess: Beyond the Tiara. Epic Ink. ISBN 978-0-7603-7363-7.
