= Theodore Thomas (filmmaker) =

American film director and producer

Theodore Thomas is an American film director and producer. He is the son of Disney animator Frank Thomas.

His films include the 1983 film Where the Toys Come From, the 1995 documentary, Frank and Ollie about the last two surviving Disney "Nine Old Men" animators, and Walt & El Grupo (2008), which documents Walt Disney and his team's visit to South America during World War II.

In 2012, Thomas produced another documentary about Disney animators, Growing up with Nine Old Men (included in the Diamond Edition of the Peter Pan DVD).

== See also ==
- Don Hahn-also makes documentaries about Disney
- Waking Sleeping Beauty
