= Les Clark =

American animator and director (1907–1979)

- Born: Leslie James Clark; November 17, 1907; Ogden, Utah, U.S.
- Died: September 12, 1979 (aged 71); Santa Barbara, California, U.S.
- Occupations: Animator, film director
- Years active: 1927–1975
- Employer: Winkler Pictures (1927–1928) Walt Disney Productions (1928–1968) Universal Pictures (1943–1979) Paramount Pictures (1979)
- Known for: One of Disney's Nine Old Men
- Spouses: Miriam Lauritzen (div. 1952) Georgia Vester (m. 1967)
- Children: 2

Leslie James "Les" Clark (November 17, 1907 - September 12, 1979) was an American Disney animator and the first of Disney's Nine Old Men at Walt Disney Productions.

== Early life ==
Leslie James Clark was born in Ogden, Utah on November 17, 1907, the eldest of 12 children to James Clark, a carpenter, and Lute Wadsworth. By 1910, the family lived in Salt Lake City and by 1920, they lived in Twin Falls, Idaho. By 1930, they lived in Los Angeles, where Clark attended Venice High School. During high school, he worked a summer job at an ice cream shop near Walt Disney's unit at Winkler Pictures. Walt and Roy Disney were frequent patrons at the shop, and Walt had once complimented Les on his lettering job of the menus. Eventually, Clark asked Walt for a job. He recalled Walt's reply:

...[Walt said] 'Bring some of your drawings in and let's see what they look like.' So, I copied some cartoons and showed them to Walt. He said I had a good line, and why don't I come to work on Monday.

== Career ==
=== 1927–1954: Animator ===
In 1927, Clark began working at Winkler the Monday after he graduated high school for a temporary position, first as a camera operator and later as an ink and paint artist. At the time, the studio were finishing the Alice Comedies and starting work on Oswald the Lucky Rabbit. In 1928, Disney traveled to New York to renegotiate their contract with Charles Mintz for a higher budget; after his failure, Clark was one in a few Winkler employees, alongside Ub Iwerks and Johnny Cannon, to leave the studio with Disney. On the way back to Los Angeles, Disney and Ub Iwerks co-created Mickey Mouse as a replacement. Iwerks mainly animated the first Mickey Mouse cartoons Plane Crazy (1928), The Gallopin' Gaucho (1928), and Steamboat Willie (1928) in which Clark worked as an inbetweener. A year later, Clark made his debut as an animator for the first Silly Symphony short The Skeleton Dance (1929). He drew the scene of a skeleton playing on another skeleton's ribcage like a xylophone.

In 1930, Iwerks left Disney to form his namesake studio. Clark then became the official animator for Mickey Mouse. Most notably, Clark animated the character in the 1935 short The Band Concert. On the Silly Symphony short The Goddess of Spring (1934), Clark used his sister Marceil as a reference model for the character Persephone. After watching his finalized animation, Clark remembered: "I was very disappointed in my effort and I told Walt so."

On Snow White and the Seven Dwarfs (1937), Clark animated several scenes of the dwarfs during the "Silly Song" sequence, including Dopey smashing his face with a cymbal, Doc playing a horn, and Doc and Happy running from Sneezy's loud sneeze. He also animated the scene of the three dwarfs dancing with Snow White, a moment first filmed in live-action that used as a visual reference for the animators. Clark then animated Mickey Mouse in The Sorcerer's Apprentice Segment for Fantasia (1940). Clark animated the scenes in which Mickey "puts the hat on and starts bringing the brooms to life—the dance up the stairs and the water vats—until he exits over the water." Clark also animated the Sugar Plum Fairies for The Nutcracker Suite segment.

Meanwhile, Clark animated a few scenes of the title character in Pinocchio (1940), most particularly when Pinocchio turns around when Geppetto inspects him before leaving for school. He next animated the train sequence to Baia in The Three Caballeros (1945). Andreas Deja complimented Clark's animation, writing it is "charming, as it chugs along to an energetic musical beat through a landscape that is reminiscent of a children's illustration."

For Song of the South (1946), Clark handled the animation interacting with Uncle Remus (portrayed by James Baskett) during the "Zip-a-Dee-Doo-Dah" musical number. A year later, he animated the Singing Harp for the Mickey and the Beanstalk segment in Fun and Fancy Free (1947). Melody Time (1948) soon followed, in which Clark animated the bumblebee for the Bumble Boogie segment.

On Cinderella (1950), Clark animated the title character, sharing the role with Eric Larson and Marc Davis. He also animated the title character in Alice in Wonderland (1951), most particularly the scene when she enlarges herself at the White Rabbit's house. Clark then reteamed with Davis again on the character Tinker Bell for the 1953 film Peter Pan. For Lady and the Tramp (1955), Clark animated the scenes of Lady as a puppy.

=== 1955–1975: Directing career ===
After Lady and the Tramp (1955), Clark transitioned into becoming a director. He remembered Disney first approached him to direct in 1940, but he decided to remain an animator. During the mid-1950s, he was asked again and accepted the offer. For the Disneyland television program, he directed and animated the opening titles with Tinker Bell. Also, he directed the "Five Senses" animated inserts with Jiminy Cricket for The Mickey Mouse Club. He made his feature directorial debut with Sleeping Beauty (1959), in which he directed the opening scene in which the townspeople arrive at the castle for Aurora's christening. He returned to directing educational animated shorts, including Donald in Mathmagic Land (1959), in which he directed a sequence with a pool table. His last project for Disney was Man, Monsters and Mysteries (1974).

He retired from Disney on September 30, 1975.

== Personal life ==
During the late 1930s, Clark met Miriam Lauritzen, a set decorator and model, who had a son Richard from a previous marriage. Clark married Lauritzen and adopted Richard. In 1945, they had a daughter, Miriam. The couple divorced in 1952 due to Miriam's alcoholism. In 1967, Clark married his second wife, Georgia Vester, after meeting at an arts exhibit.

He died of lung cancer in Santa Barbara, California on September 12, 1979.

== Filmography ==
Year	Title	Credits	Characters	Notes
1937	Snow White and the Seven Dwarfs	Animator		
1940	Pinocchio	Animator		
1940	Fantasia	Animator - Segments "The Nutcracker Suite" and "The Sorcerer's Apprentice"		
1941	Dumbo	Animator		
1943	Saludos Amigos (Short)	Animator		
1945	The Three Caballeros	Animator		
1946	Make Mine Music	Animator		
1946	Song of the South	Directing Animator		
1947	Fun and Fancy Free	Directing Animator		
1948	You Were Meant for Me	Choreographer		
1948	Melody Time	Directing Animator		
1948	So Dear to My Heart	Animator		
1950	Cinderella	Directing Animator		
1951	Plutopia (Short)	Animator		
1951	Alice in Wonderland	Directing Animator		
1952	The Little House (Short)	Animator		
1953	Peter Pan	Directing Animator		
1953	Ben and Me (Short)	Animator		
1954	The Magical World of Disney (TV Series)	Special Effects - 1 Episode		
1955	Lady and the Tramp	Directing Animator		
1955	You the Human Animal (Short)	Director		
1955	Contrast in Rhythm (Short)	Animator		
1956 - 1958	The Magical World of Disney (TV Series)	Animator - 3 Episodes		
1958	Paul Bunyan (Short)	Director		
1959	Sleeping Beauty	Sequence Director		
1959	Donald in Mathmagic Land (Short)	Sequence Director		
1961	One Hundred and One Dalmatians	Character Animator		
1961	Donald and the Wheel (Short)	Animator		
1961 - 1970	The Magical World of Disney (TV Series)	Director - 3 Episodes		
1962	A Symposium on Popular Songs (Short)	Animator		
1963	The Magical World of Disney (TV Series)	Sequence Director - 1 Episode		
1964	The Restless Sea (TV Movie Documentary)	Director		
1965	Freewayphobia #1 (Short)	Director		
1965	Steel and America (Short)	Director		
1965	Donald's Fire Survival Plan (Short)	Director		
1965	Goofy's Freeway Troubles (Short)	Director		
1967	Family Planning (Short)	Director		
1968	The Mickey Mouse Anniversary Show	Animator		
1969	Physical Fitness and Good Health (Short)	Director		
1969	The Social Side of Health (Short)	Director		
1969	The Project (Short)	Director		
1969	The Game (Short)	Director		
1969	The Fight (Short)	Director		
1969	Steps Towards Maturity and Health (Short)	Director		
1970	New Girl (Short)	Director		
1970	Lunch Money (Short)	Director		
1972	The Great Search: Man's Need for Power and Energy (Documentary short)	Director		
1973	VD Attack Plan (Short)	Director		
1973	I'm No Fool with Electricity (Short)	Director		
1974	Man, Monsters and Mysteries (Short)	Director		
1980	Mickey Mouse Disco (Short)	Animator		
1984	DTV: Rock, Rhythm & Blues (Video)	Animator		
1984	DTV: Pop & Rock (Video)	Animator		
1984	DTV: Golden Oldies (Short)	Animator		
2000	Fantasia 2000	Animator - Segment "The Sorcerer's Apprentice"		

== Sources ==
- Canemaker, John (2001). Walt Disney's Nine Old Men and the Art of Animation. New York: Disney Editions. ISBN 978-0-786-86496-6.
- Culhane, John (1983). Walt Disney's Fantasia. Harry N. Abrams. ISBN 978-3-8228-0393-6.
- Deja, Andreas (2015). "Les Clark". The Nine Old Men: Lessons, Techniques, and Inspiration from Disney's Great Animators. CRC Press. pp. 1–31. ISBN 978-1-1350-1586-2.
- Ghez, Didier, ed. (2012). "Les Clark by John Culhane". Walt's People: Volume 12—Talking Disney with the Artists who Knew Him. Theme Park Press. pp. 29–41. ISBN 978-1-4771-4789-4.
- Thomas, Frank; Johnston, Ollie (1981). Disney Animation: The Illusion of Life. Abbeville Press. ISBN 0-89659-233-2.
- Peri, Don (2008). "Les Clark". Working with Walt: Interviews with Disney Artists. University Press of Mississippi. pp. 119–133. ISBN 978-1-604-73023-4.
