= Eric Larson =

American animator (1905–1988)

- Born: Eric Cleon Larson; September 3, 1905; Cleveland, Utah, U.S.
- Died: October 25, 1988 (aged 83); La Cañada Flintridge, California, U.S.
- Occupation: Animator
- Years active: 1933–1986
- Known for: One of Disney's "Nine Old Men" Creation of Disney's Winnie the Pooh
- Spouse: Gertrude Jannes Larson (m. 1933; died 1975)

Eric Cleon Larson (September 3, 1905 – October 25, 1988) was an American animator at Walt Disney Productions starting in 1933, and was one of "Disney's Nine Old Men".

== Biography ==
Born in Cleveland, Utah, Larson was the son of Danish immigrants Peter, a clothing salesman, and Nora. He worked on such films as Snow White and the Seven Dwarfs, Pinocchio, Fantasia, Bambi, The Three Caballeros, Make Mine Music, Melody Time, Cinderella, Alice in Wonderland, Peter Pan, Lady and the Tramp, Sleeping Beauty, One Hundred and One Dalmatians, The Sword in the Stone, The Jungle Book, and The Many Adventures of Winnie the Pooh. Throughout the years, Larson has animated characters on classics like The Aristocats and Robin Hood and also provided the titles on The Rescuers (along with Mel Shaw and Burny Mattinson). In the 1980s his work was minor, but he served as animation consultant on animated films and shorts like Mickey's Christmas Carol, The Black Cauldron, and The Great Mouse Detective.

In 1973, he began a recruitment training program that brought a new generation of animators into the Disney studio. Many well-known figures in animation today went through Larson's training program, including Brad Bird, Don Bluth, Chris Buck, Tim Burton, Randy Cartwright, Ron Clements, Andreas Deja, Gary Goldman, Ed Gombert, Mark Henn, Dan Haskett, Glen Keane, Bill Kroyer, John Lasseter, John Musker, Phil Nibbelink, Richard Rich, Burny Mattinson, Melvin Shaw, Jeffrey J. Varab, John Pomeroy, Joe Ranft, Jerry Rees, Henry Selick and Tad Stones among many others.

Larson was married to Gertrude Larson. By his retirement in 1986, he was the longest-working employee at Disney, having worked there for 53 years. He died on October 25, 1988, at the age of 83.

== Filmography ==
Year	Title	Credits	Characters	Notes
1937	Snow White and the Seven Dwarfs	Animator		
1940	Pinocchio	Animation Director		
1940	Fantasia	Animation Supervisor - Segment "The Pastoral Symphony"		
1942	Bambi	Supervising Animator		
1950	Cinderella	Directing Animator		
1951	Alice in Wonderland	Directing Animator		
1953	Peter Pan	Directing Animator		
1955	Lady and the Tramp	Directing Animator		
