= Ollie Johnston =

American animator (1912–2008)

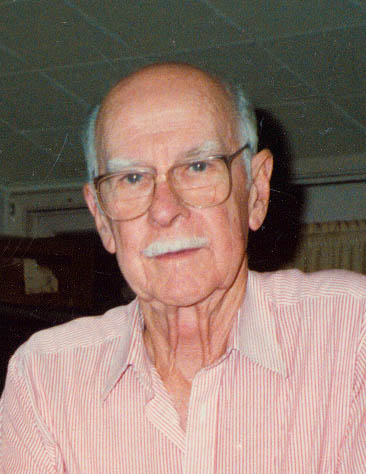
- Johnston in 1989
- Born: Oliver Martin Johnston Jr. October 31, 1912; Palo Alto, California, U.S.
- Died: April 14, 2008 (aged 95); Sequim, Washington, U.S.
- Other names: Oliver M. Johnston, Jr. Oliver M. Johnston; Oliver Johnston
- Education: Stanford University; University of California, Berkeley
- Occupation: Animator
- Years active: 1935–1981 (at Disney); 1981–1993 (book author)
- Employer: Walt Disney Productions (1935-1978)
- Known for: One of Disney's Nine Old Men
- Spouse: Marie E. Worthey (m. 1943; died 2005)
- Children: 2

Oliver Martin Johnston Jr. (October 31, 1912 – April 14, 2008) was an American motion picture animator. He was one of Disney's Nine Old Men, and the last surviving one. He was recognized by The Walt Disney Company with its Disney Legend Award in 1989. His work was recognized with the National Medal of Arts in 2005.

== Career ==
Johnston was an animator at Walt Disney Studios from 1934 to 1981, and became a directing animator beginning with Pinocchio, released in 1940. He contributed to most Disney animated features, including Fantasia and Bambi. His last full work for Disney came with The Rescuers, in which he was caricatured as one of the film's characters, the cat Rufus. The last film he worked on was The Fox and the Hound. His work includes Mr. Smee (in Peter Pan), the Stepsisters (in Cinderella), the District Attorney (in The Adventures of Ichabod and Mr. Toad), and Prince John (in Robin Hood). According to the book The Disney Villain, written by Johnston and Frank Thomas, Johnston also partnered with Thomas on creating characters such as Ichabod Crane (in The Adventures of Ichabod and Mr. Toad), Sir Hiss (in Robin Hood), and story consultant in Little Nemo: Adventures in Slumberland.

Johnston co-authored, with Frank Thomas, the reference book Disney Animation: The Illusion of Life, which contained the 12 basic principles of animation. This book helped preserve the knowledge of the techniques that were developed at the studio. The partnership of Frank Thomas and Ollie Johnston is fondly presented in the documentary Frank and Ollie, produced by Thomas' son Theodore, who in 2012 also produced another documentary, Growing up with Nine Old Men, included in the Diamond Edition of the Peter Pan DVD.

== Personal life ==
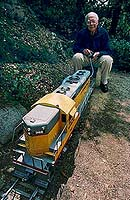
Johnston on his backyard railroad in 1993

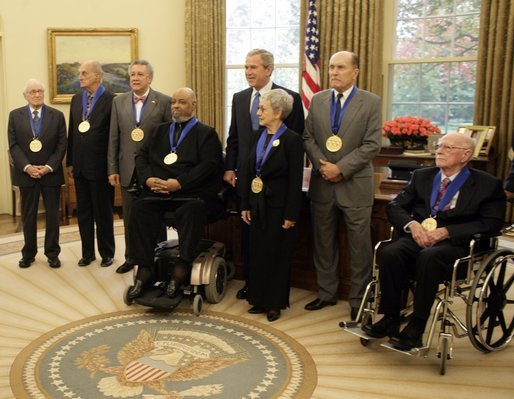
President George W. Bush stands with recipients of the 2005 National Medal of Arts on November 9, 2005, in the Oval Office. Among those recognized for their outstanding contributions to the arts were, from left: Leonard Garment, Louis Auchincloss, Paquito D'Rivera, James DePreist, Tina Ramirez, Robert Duvall, and Johnston

Born in Palo Alto, California, to Oliver, a Stanford professor, and Florence Johnston, Johnston had two older sisters, Winifred and Florence. Johnston attended Palo Alto High School and Stanford University, where he worked on the campus humor magazine Stanford Chaparral with fellow future animator Frank Thomas, with whom he formed a lifelong friendship. Johnston then transferred to the Chouinard Art Institute in his senior year. Johnston married a fellow Disney employee, ink and paint artist Marie Worthey, in 1943. Marie died May 20, 2005, at the age of 87.

In the 1980s and 1990s, Johnston served on the advisory board of the National Student Film Institute and often was a presenter at the annual film festival's award ceremonies. Brad Bird paid a tribute to Ollie Johnston with an animated cameo of Johnston in the 2004 Pixar film The Incredibles, as well as a cameo in his 1999 film The Iron Giant, where Johnston played a train engineer. Both cameos also included Frank Thomas.

On November 10, 2005, Ollie Johnston was among the recipients of the prestigious National Medal of Arts, presented by President George W. Bush in an Oval Office ceremony.

Ollie Johnston died of natural causes on April 14, 2008, at the age of 95. He was the last surviving member of Disney's Nine Old Men at the time of his death.

=== Miniature railroad ===
Johnston's hobby was live steam trains. Starting in 1949, he built the 4 3/4 in (121 mm) gauge La Cañada Valley Railroad, a miniature backyard railroad with three 1:12-scale locomotives at his home in Flintridge, California. The locomotives are now owned by his sons. This railroad was one of the inspirations for Walt Disney to build his own backyard railroad, the Carolwood Pacific Railroad, which inspired the building of the railroad in Disneyland in Anaheim, California. Johnston was a founding Governor of the Carolwood Pacific Historical Society along with his fellow Disney animator and railfan, Ward Kimball. The 1:4-scale Victorian depot from Johnston's backyard was restored and moved to a location near Walt Disney's Carolwood Barn within the Los Angeles Live Steamers Railroad Museum in Griffith Park, Los Angeles.

In the 1960s, Johnston acquired and restored a full-size, 3 ft (914 mm) narrow gauge Porter steam locomotive originally built in 1901, which he named the Marie E. He also built the Deer Lake Park & Julian Railroad (DLP&J) at his vacation estate in Julian, California, to run the locomotive with a small gondola and caboose pulled behind it. The Marie E. first ran on the DLP&J in 1968. The DLP&J was 0.5 miles (0.80 km) long and utilized the railroad ties from the defunct Viewliner Train of Tomorrow attraction in Disneyland. Johnston sold the vacation estate and the narrow gauge train in 1993. The engine and its consist were later sold to John Lasseter (of Pixar Studios fame) around 2002. On May 10, 2005, it ran on the Disneyland Railroad during a private early morning event organized by Lasseter to honor Johnston, who was able to take the throttle of the Marie E. one last time. This was the first time that the Walt Disney Company permitted outside railroad equipment to run at any Disney Resort. The engine is still fully operational and presently runs on the Justi Creek Railway, located within the vineyards of Lasseter Family Winery, also owned by Lasseter.

== Filmography ==
Year	Title	Credits	Characters	Notes
1934	Two-Gun Mickey (Short)	Inbetween Artist		Uncredited
1935	Mickey's Garden (Short)	Inbetween Artist		Uncredited
1936	Mickey's Rival (Short)	Assistant Animator		Uncredited
1936	More Kittens	Assistant Animator		Uncredited
1937	Snow White and the Seven Dwarfs	Assistant Animator		Uncredited
1937	Little Hiawatha (short)	Animator		Uncredited
1938	Brave Little Tailor (short)	Animator	Townspeople	Uncredited
1939	Mickey's Surprise Party (short)	Animator	Mickey and Minnie	Uncredited
1939	The Practical Pig (short)	Animator		Uncredited
1939	The Pointer (short)	Animator	Mickey looking for Bear	Uncredited
1940	Pinocchio	Animator	Pinocchio telling a lie	Credited as Oliver M. Johnston
1940	Fantasia	Animation Supervisor - Segment "The Pastoral Symphony"		Credited as Oliver M. Johnston Jr.
1942	Bambi	Supervising Animator	Bambi, Thumper	Credited as Oliver M. Johnston Jr.
1942	All Together (short)	Animator		Uncredited
1942	How to Play Baseball (short)	Animator		Uncredited
1943	Victory Through Air Power (Documentary)	Animator		Credited as Oliver M. Johnston Jr.
1943	Reason and Emotion (Short)	Animator	Female Reason, Female Emotion	Uncredited
1943	The Winged Scourge (Documentary short)	Animator		Uncredited
1943	Chicken Little (short)	Animator		Uncredited
1945	The Three Caballeros	Animator	Panchito Pistoles, José Carioca, Donald Duck	
1946	Make Mine Music	Animator	Peter	
1946	Song of the South	Directing Animator	Br’er Rabbit, Br’er Fox, Br’er Bear	
1948	Melody Time	Directing Animator	Johnny Appleseed, Johnny’s Angel, Little Toot	
1949	The Adventures of Ichabod and Mr. Toad	Directing Animator	Angus Macbadger, Rat, District Attorney, Judge, Ichabod Crane, Brom Bones, Katrina Van Tassel	
1950	Cinderella	Directing Animator	Anastasia Tremaine, Drizella Tremaine	
1951	Alice in Wonderland	Directing Animator	Alice, King Of Hearts	
1952	Susie the Little Blue Coupe (Short)	Animator		
1953	Peter Pan	Directing Animator	Mr. Smee	
1953	Ben and Me (Short)	Animator	Benjamin Franklin	
1955	Lady and the Tramp	Directing Animator	Lady, Jock And Trusty	
1959	Sleeping Beauty	Directing Animator	Flora, Fauna And Merryweather	
1961	One Hundred and One Dalmatians	Directing Animator	Pongo, Pertida, Dalmatian Puppies, Nanny	
1963	The Sword in the Stone	Directing Animator	Merlin, Archimedes, Arthur	
1964	Mary Poppins	Animator	The Penguin Waiters	
1967	The Jungle Book	Directing Animator	Bagheera, Mowgli, Shanti, Baloo	
1968	Winnie the Pooh and the Blustery Day (Short)	Animator	Rabbit, Kanga, Roo, Winnie the Pooh and Piglet	
1970	The Aristocats	Directing Animator	Marie, Toulouse, Abigail and Amelia Gabble, Uncle Waldo	
1973	Robin Hood	Directing Animator	Robin Hood, Little John, Prince John, Sir Hiss	
1974	Winnie the Pooh and Tigger Too (Short)	Directing Animator	Pooh and Piglet	
1977	The Many Adventures of Winnie the Pooh	Animator		
1977	The Rescuers	Directing Animator	Miss Bianca and Bernard, Rufus, Penny, Orville	
1981	The Fox and the Hound	Supervising Animator	Young Tod, Young Copper, Chief	
1987	The Chipmunk Adventure	Special Thanks		
1992	Little Nemo: Adventures in Slumberland	Story Consultant		Credited as Oliver Johnston
1995	Frank and Ollie (Documentary)	Himself		
1999	The Iron Giant	Additional Voices / Animator	Himself	
2004	The Incredibles	Additional Voices / Special Thanks	Himself	

== Books by Johnston ==
- Disney Animation: The Illusion of Life (1981)
- Too Funny for Words: Disney's Greatest Sight Gags (ISBN 0-89659-747-4)
- Walt Disney's Bambi—the Story and the Film (ISBN 1-55670-160-8)
- The Disney Villain (ISBN 1-56282-792-8)

== See also ==
- Rail transport in Walt Disney Parks and Resorts

== Sources ==
- Amendola, Dana (2015). All Aboard: The Wonderful World of Disney Trains (1st ed.). Disney Editions. ISBN 978-1-4231-1714-8.
- Broggie, Michael (2014). Walt Disney's Railroad Story: The Small-Scale Fascination That Led to a Full-Scale Kingdom (4th ed.). The Donning Company Publishers. ISBN 978-1-57864-914-3.
