= Frank Thomas (animator) =

American animator and writer (1912–2004)

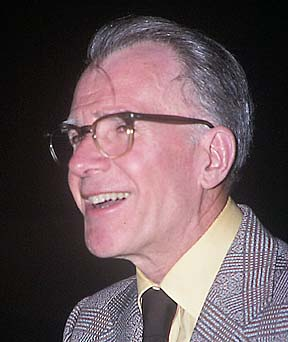
- Thomas in 1974
- Born: Franklin Rosborough Thomas; September 5, 1912; Santa Monica, California, U.S.
- Died: September 8, 2004 (aged 92); La Cañada Flintridge, California, U.S.
- Education: Stanford University
- Occupation: Animator
- Years active: 1935–2004
- Employer: Walt Disney Productions (1934–1982)
- Known for: One of Disney's Nine Old Men
- Spouse: Jeanette A. Thomas (m. 1946)
- Children: 4, including Theodore Thomas

Franklin Rosborough Thomas (September 5, 1912 – September 8, 2004) was an American animator and pianist. He was one of Walt Disney's leading team of animators known as the Nine Old Men.

== Biography ==
Thomas was born on September 5, 1912, in Santa Monica, California, to Frank Thomas, a teacher, and Ina Gregg. He had two older brothers, Lawrence and Welburne. He grew up in Fresno. Frank Thomas attended Stanford University, where he was a member of Theta Delta Chi fraternity and worked on campus humor magazine The Stanford Chaparral with Ollie Johnston. After graduating from Stanford in 1933, he attended Chouinard Art Institute, then joined The Walt Disney Company on September 24, 1934, as employee number 224. There he animated dozens of feature films and shorts, and also was a member of the Dixieland band Firehouse Five Plus Two, playing the piano.

== Career ==
Camouflage (1944) was a World War II training film

His work in animated cartoon shorts included Brave Little Tailor, in which he animated scenes of Mickey Mouse and the king, Mickey and the bear in The Pointer, and German dialogue scenes in the World War II propaganda short Education for Death (shortly before Thomas enlisted in the Army Air Forces). During World War II he was assigned to the First Motion Picture Unit where he made training films.

In feature films, among the characters and scenes Thomas animated were the dwarfs crying over Snow White's "dead" body, Pinocchio singing at the marionette theatre, Bambi and Thumper on the ice, Lady and the Tramp eating spaghetti, the three fairies in Sleeping Beauty, Merlin and Arthur as squirrels and the "wizard's duel" between Merlin and Madam Mim in The Sword in the Stone (in which he was paired with animator Milt Kahl to great effect), King Louie in The Jungle Book (the song number "I Wan'na Be Like You" featuring King Louie and Baloo the Bear re-teamed him with Kahl), the dancing penguins in Mary Poppins, and Winnie The Pooh and Piglet in Winnie the Pooh and the Blustery Day and Winnie the Pooh and Tigger Too. Thomas was directing animator for several memorable villains, including the evil stepmother Lady Tremaine in Cinderella, the Queen of Hearts in Alice in Wonderland, Captain James Hook in Peter Pan, and story consultant in Little Nemo: Adventures in Slumberland. He retired from Disney on January 31, 1978. In the 1980s and 1990s, Thomas served on the advisory board of the National Student Film Institute and often was a presenter at the annual film festival's award ceremonies.

Thomas co-authored, with fellow Disney legend Ollie Johnston, the comprehensive book Disney Animation: The Illusion of Life, first published by Abbeville Press in 1981. Regarded as the definitive resource book on traditional hand-drawn character animation (particularly in the Disney style), the book has been republished numerous times, and is widely considered "the bible" among character animators. The book summarized the Disney approach to animation through the so-called 12 basic principles of animation.

Thomas and Johnston were also profiled in the 1995 documentary Frank and Ollie, which screened at the 20th Toronto International Film Festival, directed by Thomas's son Theodore Thomas. The film profiled their careers, private lives, and the personal friendship between the two men. In 2012, Theodore Thomas also directed another short documentary, "Growing up with Nine Old Men", included in the Diamond edition of Disney's Peter Pan DVD.

Thomas's last work in an animated film before his death was for The Incredibles (directed by Brad Bird), although he voiced a character, rather than animating one. Frank and his friend and colleague Ollie Johnston voiced and were caricatured as two old men saying "That's old school ..." "Yeah, no school like the old school." The pair had previously been heard, and caricatured, as the two train engineers in Bird's The Iron Giant. Thomas died in La Cañada Flintridge, California, on September 8, 2004, three days after his 92nd birthday. His widow, Jeanette A. Thomas, died on September 29, 2012.

The 2001 biography Walt Disney's Nine Old Men & The Art of Animation by John Canemaker (ISBN 0-7868-6496-6) chronicles Thomas' life.

On the Animation Podcast, Disney director John Musker discussed Frank Thomas, and mentioned that at one time, fellow animation great Chuck Jones had christened Thomas the "Laurence Olivier of animators."

== Filmography ==
=== Films ===
Year	Title	Credits	Characters	Notes
1935	The Cookie Carnival (Short)	Animator		uncredited
1935	Music Land (short)	Animator		uncredited
1936	Orphans' Picnic (Short)	Animator		uncredited
1936	Mickey's Circus (short)	Animator		uncredited
1936	Mickey's Elephant (short)	Animator		uncredited
1936	More Kittens (short)	Animator		uncredited
1937	Snow White and the Seven Dwarfs	Animator	The Seven Dwarfs	
1937	Little Hiawatha (short)	Animator		uncredited
1938	Brave Little Tailor (short)	Animator	Mickey Mouse	uncredited
1939	The Practical Pig (short)	Animator		uncredited
1939	The Pointer (short)	Animator	"Mickey looking for Bear"	uncredited
1940	Pinocchio	Animation Director	Pinocchio	Credited as Franklin Thomas
1942	Bambi	Supervising Animator	Bambi, Thumper, Faline	Credited as Franklin Thomas
1942	All Together (short)	Animator		uncredited
1943	The Grain That Built a Hemisphere (Documentary)	Animator		
1943	Victory Vehicles (Short)	Animator		uncredited
1943	The Winged Scourge (Documentary short)	Animator		uncredited
1943	Education for Death: The Making of the Nazi (short)	Animator		uncredited
1944	Position Firing	Animator		
1944	Camouflage (short)	Director		
1945	The Three Caballeros	Animator	"The Flying Gauchito"	Credited as Franklin Thomas
1946	In Dutch (Short)	Animator		
1949	The Adventures of Ichabod and Mr. Toad	Directing Animator	Mr. Toad, Water Rat, Mole, Cyril Proudbottom, Ichabod Crane, Brom Bones, Katrina Van Tassel	
1949	Pueblo Pluto (Short)	Animator		uncredited
1950	Cinderella	Directing Animator	Lady Tremaine, a few scenes of the Grand Duke	
1951	Alice in Wonderland	Directing Animator	Doorknob, Queen of Hearts	
1953	Peter Pan	Directing Animator	Captain Hook, a few scenes of Smee	
1955	Lady and the Tramp	Directing Animator	Lady, Tramp, Jock, Trusty	
1959	Sleeping Beauty	Directing Animator	Three Good Fairies	
1959	Donald in Mathmagic Land (Short)	Animator		uncredited
1961	One Hundred and One Dalmatians	Directing Animator	Pongo, Perdita, Puppies, Roger, Anita, Nanny, Labrador	
1963	The Sword in the Stone	Directing Animator	Arthur, Merlin, Archimedes, Squirrels, Madam Mim	
1964	Mary Poppins	Animator	Dancing Penguins	
1967	The Jungle Book	Directing Animator	Mowgli, Baloo, King Louie, Kaa	
1968	Winnie the Pooh and the Blustery Day (Short)	Animator	Winnie the Pooh, Piglet, Owl, Christopher Robin	
1970	The Aristocats	Story / Directing Animator	Duchess, O'Malley, Amelia and Abigail Gabble, Napoleon, Lafayette, Edgar	
1973	Robin Hood	Directing Animator / Story Sequences	Robin Hood in stork disguise, Sheriff of Nottingham, Skippy, Bunnies, Maid Marian, Prince John, Little John	
1974	Winnie the Pooh and Tigger Too (Short)	Directing Animator		
1977	The Many Adventures of Winnie the Pooh	Animator	Winnie the Pooh, Piglet, Owl, Christopher Robin	
1977	The Rescuers	Story / Directing Animator	Bernard, Miss Bianca, The Chairman, Orville, Brutus, Nero, Ellie Mae, Luke, The Swamp Folk	
1981	The Fox and the Hound	Supervising Animator	Tod, Copper	
1987	The Chipmunk Adventure	Special Thanks		
1992	Little Nemo: Adventures in Slumberland	Story Consultant		
1995	Frank and Ollie (Documentary)	Himself		
1999	The Iron Giant	Additional Voices	Himself	
2004	The Incredibles	Additional Voices / Special Thanks / posthumous release	Himself	

=== Television series ===
Year	Title	Credits	Characters	Notes
1961–82	Disneyland	Animator (3 episodes, 1961–1970), directing animator (1 episode, 1982)		4 episodes

== Books (all with Johnston) ==
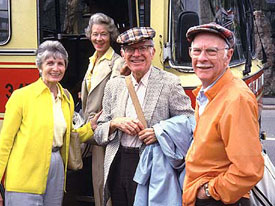
Frank Thomas (center) with his best friend Ollie Johnston and their respective wives in 1985

- Disney Animation: The Illusion of Life
- Too Funny For Words: Disney's Greatest Sight Gags
- The Disney Villain (ISBN 1-56282-792-8)
- Bambi: The Story and the Film, accompanied by a flip book
