= Disney Animation: The Illusion of Life =

Nonfiction book on Disney animation history

- Book cover (1995 edition)
- Author: Frank Thomas; Ollie Johnston
- Published: 1981
- Publisher: Abbeville Press
- Publication place: United States
- Pages: 576
- ISBN: 0-89659-233-2

Disney Animation: The Illusion of Life (later republished as The Illusion of Life: Disney Animation) is a book by Frank Thomas and Ollie Johnston, two of the key animators at Disney during the Golden age of American animation.

== Contents ==
This book gives a history of Disney animation, explaining the processes involved in clear, non-technical terms. The philosophy is expressed in the so-called 12 basic principles of animation. It contains 489 plates in full color, as well as thousands of black-and-white illustrations, ranging from storyboard sketches to entire animation sequences.

== Editions ==
The 1981 edition published by Abbeville Press (ISBN 0896592332) used better quality paper and consequently possessed higher image quality than either the 1988 edition or the revised edition from 1995 (ISBN 0-7868-6070-7) (published by Disney's Hyperion with the inverted title The Illusion of Life: Disney Animation).

== Legacy ==
Topping the list of "best animation books of all time" in a poll at AWN, The Illusion of Life is still used as reference on and source of inspiration for character animation.

In 2013, the book's third chapter (which explains the twelve basic principles of animation) was republished in its entirety with the permission of the authors' heirs in the Disney Animated iPad app from Touch Press. All the illustrations were fully animated in the app version, and many parts of the chapter were annotated with explanatory comments from Disney's current animators.
