= Donald in Mathmagic Land =

1959 Donald Duck cartoon

- 1988 VHS cover
- Directed by: Hamilton Luske (supervising); Wolfgang Reitherman; Les Clark; Joshua Meador (sequences)
- Story by: Milt Banta; Bill Berg; Heinz Haber
- Produced by: Walt Disney
- Starring: Clarence Nash; Paul Frees
- Narrated by: Paul Frees
- Cinematography: Edward Colman
- Edited by: Lloyd L. Richardson
- Music by: Buddy Baker
- Production company: Walt Disney Productions
- Distributed by: Buena Vista Film Distribution
- Release date: June 26, 1959
- Running time: 27:35
- Country: United States
- Language: English

Donald in Mathmagic Land is an American live-action animated featurette produced by Walt Disney Productions and featuring Donald Duck. The short was directed by Hamilton Luske (with Wolfgang Reitherman, Les Clark, and Joshua Meador as sequence directors) and was released on June 26, 1959. It was nominated for an Academy Award for Best Documentary (Short Subject) at the 32nd Academy Awards, and became a widely viewed educational film in American schools of the 1960s and beyond.

== Plot ==
The film begins with Donald Duck, holding a hunting rifle, as he passes through a doorway to find he has entered Mathmagic Land. This "mighty strange" fantasy land contains trees with square roots, a stream flowing with numbers, and a walking pencil that plays tic-tac-toe. A geometric bird recites (almost perfectly) the first 15 digits of pi. Donald soon hears the voice of the unseen "True Spirit of Adventure", who will guide him on his journey through "the wonderland of mathematics".

Donald is initially not interested in exploring this foreign land, believing that mathematics is just for "eggheads" until "Mr. Spirit" suggests a fascinating connection between math and music. Intrigued, Donald discovers the relationships between octaves and string length which form the musical scale of today. Next, Donald finds himself in ancient Greece, where Pythagoras and his contemporaries are discovering these same relationships. Pythagoras (on the harp), a flute player, and a double bass player hold a "jam session" which Donald joins after a few moments using a vase as a bongo drum. Pythagoras' mathematical discoveries are, as the Spirit explains, the basis of today's music, and that no type of music could have ever existed without "eggheads". The segment ends with a sequence of live-action musicians playing both jazz and classical music and Pythagoras' acquaintances magically disappearing.

After shaking hands with Pythagoras, who then vanishes, Donald finds on his hand a pentagram, the symbol of the secret Pythagorean society. The Spirit then shows Donald how the mysterious golden section appears in this ancient magic star. Next, the star itself is shown to contain the pattern for constructing golden rectangles many times over. According to the Spirit, the golden rectangle has influenced both ancient and modern cultures in many ways. Donald then learns how the golden rectangle appears in many ancient buildings, such as the Parthenon and the Notre Dame cathedral. Paintings such as the Mona Lisa and various sculptures such as the Venus de Milo contain several golden rectangles. The use of the golden rectangle is found in modern architecture, such as the United Nations building in New York City. Modern painters have also rediscovered the infinite mathematical magic of stars and golden rectangles.

The Spirit shows Donald how the golden rectangle and pentagram are even related to the human body and nature themselves. The human body itself contains the "ideal proportions" of the golden section. However, Donald, overinterpreting the Spirit's advice, tries to make his own cartoon body fit such a proportion, but his efforts are to no avail; he ends up "all pent up in a pentagon". The pentagram and pentagon are then shown to be found in many flowers and animals, such as the petunia, the star jasmine, the starfish, the waxflower. Then, with the help of the inside of a nautilus shell, the Spirit explains that the magic proportions of the golden section are often found in the spirals of nature's designs, quoting Pythagoras: "Everything is arranged according to number and mathematical shape."

Donald then learns that mathematics applies not only to nature, architecture, and music, but also to games that are played on geometrical surfaces, including chess, baseball, American football, basketball, hopscotch, and three-cushion billiard. In chess, Donald suggests the game checkers, but the Spirit does not pursue this option. Donald even volunteers the game tiddlywinks, but the Spirit also rejects this option. Instead, the Spirit challenges Donald Duck to the ancient and challenging game of chess, as made famous by Lewis Carroll's 1871 novel Through the Looking-Glass. In this exciting and imaginative scene, Carroll is portrayed as both a writer and a mathematician. Then, the extended billiards scene features a non-speaking live actor shows the calculations involved in the game's "diamond system", and Donald eventually learns how to do the right calculations to hit ten cushions all while needlessly making it tough for himself.

The Spirit then asks Donald to play a mental game, but he finds Donald's mind to be too cluttered with "Antiquated Ideas", "Bungling", "False Concepts", "Superstitions", and "Confusion". After some mental housecleaning, Donald plays with a circle and a triangle in his mind. He is then able to transform them into a sphere and a cone, and he proceeds to rediscover some of man's most useful past inventions, such as the wheel, train, magnifying glass, drill, spring, propeller, and telescope. Donald then discovers that pentagrams can be drawn inside each other indefinitely, almost as if by magic. In the end, he learns that numbers provide an avenue to consider the concept of infinity itself. The Spirit states that scientific knowledge and technological advances are unlimited, and the key to unlocking the doors of the future is mathematics. By the end of the film, Donald understands and appreciates the value of mathematics and the boundless powers of human imagination and invention. The film closes with a beautiful and inspiring quotation from Galileo Galilei: "Mathematics is the alphabet with which God has written the universe."

== Cast ==
- Clarence Nash as Donald Duck (voice)
- Paul Frees as The True Spirit of Adventure / Narrator (voice), and the Pi creature (voice)
- June Foray as the Chess Queen (voice)
- Daws Butler as the Chess King (voice)
- Roman Yanez as The Billiards Player

== Production ==
The film was directed by Hamilton Luske. Contributors included Disney artists John Hench and Art Riley, voice talent Paul Frees, and scientific expert Heinz Haber, who had worked on the Disney space shows. It was released on a bill with Darby O'Gill and the Little People. In 1959, it was nominated for an Academy Award for (Best Documentary – Short Subjects). In 1961, two years after its release, it was shown as part of the first program of Walt Disney's Wonderful World of Color with an introduction by Ludwig Von Drake.

The film was made available to schools and became one of the most popular educational films ever made by Disney. As Walt Disney himself explained: "The cartoon is a good medium to stimulate interest. We have recently explained mathematics in a film and in that way excited public interest in this very important subject."

== Releases ==
- 1959 - theatrical release
- 1961 - Walt Disney's Wonderful World of Color, episode #8.1: "An Adventure in Color/Mathmagicland" (TV)

== Home media ==
The short was released on November 11, 2008 on Walt Disney Treasures: The Chronological Donald, Volume Four: 1951-1961.

Additional releases include:

- 1988 - Walt Disney Mini Classics: Donald in Mathmagic Land (VHS)
- 2007 - Donald in Mathmagic Land (DVD exclusive to the Disney Movie Club)
- 2009 - Donald in Mathmagic Land (DVD)

== In other media ==
- A comic book adaptation was made, scripted by Don R. Christensen, pencilled by Tony Strobl, and inked by Steve Steere. This version differs in some ways from the original film version, providing a better context for Donald's excursion into Mathmagic Land.
- The Figment comic book miniseries from Marvel Comics has the outcast sound sprite Fye mention Mathmagic Land as one of the other countries in the Realm of Imagination.
- The House of Mouse episode "Gone Goofy" features an advertisement for Mathmagic Land at the end.
- In the 2023 Ted Lasso episode "Sunflowers", Lasso consumes what he believes to be psychedelic drugs and begins to hallucinate about the geometry of triangles. The style of animated hallucination sequence is visually similar to that of Donald in Mathmagic Land, and Lasso also hears the voice of The True Spirit of Adventure (voiced by Corey Burton) explaining the significance of the triangle.
- The short was featured during the opening sequence of the Futurama episode "The Numberland Gap". The short also served as an inspiration for the main plot of the episode.
