= Aeropause =

Aeropause is the region in which the functional effects of the atmosphere on man and craft begin to cease.

== Background ==
In the 1950s, there were discussions between the U. S. Air Force School of Medicine Aviation and the Lovelace Foundation regarding how to support the efforts to accomplish crewed travel in the upper atmosphere. A research plan was developed that encompassed the aeromedical, aeronautical, astrophysical, and biological aspects that were deemed vital. At San Antonio, Texas in November 1951 a symposium was held with a focus aimed at forecasting the future research needed for crewed flight that approached the upper limits of the atmosphere. At the symposium, the presentations and discussions focused on 4 major disciplines that comprised the areas of astrophysics, aeronautical engineering, radiobiology, and aviation medicine.

== The Aeropause ==
At the time when the term aeropause became relevant to the pursuits of mankind into the upper regions of Earth's atmosphere, there did not exist a precise description for the word. The judgement of experts in the various fields was solicited and input was sought to define the term aeropause. The terms from aeromedical and aeronautical disciplines along with terms from geophysics, astrophysics, and radiobiology were not sufficient to depict this region of the atmosphere where human endeavors sought to venture and explore. The current terms in use were limited and insufficient. The terms available and that came under consideration were aerosphere, aeropause, and astronautics. According to Clayton S. White, the expression aeropause is a coined word first spoken by Dr. Konrad Buettner of the Department of Space Medicine at Randolph Field during a conference. Again, referring to White: "aerosphere was visualized as that region in which flight was possible currently. The aeropause was the region just above this, to be different yesterday, today, and tomorrow, as progress in aviation ensued".

Heinz Haber, Department of Space Medicine at Randolph Field, an expert in space medicine sought a more functional definition and said the: "aeropause should be defined as that region in which the functional effects of the atmosphere on man and craft begin to cease". The aeronautical engineer defined the aeropause as those areas of the atmosphere where the physiological necessities of the aircrew became the limiting factors for the design of aircraft and supporting equipment.

The study of the aeropause requires a blend of several disciplines from the biological sciences and the physical sciences. Important fields necessary for research that involves the aeropause include aviation medicine, geophysics, astronomy, astrophysics, aeronautical engineering, biophysics, and radiobiology.
