= Philip M. Jefferies =

American set decorator

- Born: May 31, 1925; Pennsylvania
- Died: April 6, 1987 (aged 61); Los Angeles, California
- Occupation: Set decorator
- Years active: 1954-1987

Philip M. Jefferies (May 31, 1925 – April 6, 1987) was an American set decorator. He was active from the mid-1950s through the mid-1980s. He was nominated for an Academy Award in the category Best Art Direction for the 1973 film Tom Sawyer.

== Filmography ==
Film
Year	Title	Role	Notes
1962	The Manchurian Candidate	Assistant art director Art director	Uncredited as art director
1964	Seven Days in May	Assistant art director Art director	Uncredited
1965	How to Murder Your Wife	Assistant art director Art director	
1965	Synanon	Art director	Credited as Philip Jefferies
1966	This Property Is Condemned	Art director	Credited as Phil Jefferies
1967	Valley of the Dolls	Production designer	Uncredited
1967	Oh Dad, Poor Dad, Mamma's Hung You in the Closet and I'm Feelin' So Sad	Art director	Credited as Phil Jefferies
1967	The St. Valentine's Day Massacre	Art director	Credited as Philip Jefferies
1969	Butch Cassidy and the Sundance Kid	Art director	Credited as Philip Jefferies
1970	Move	Art director	Credited as Philip Jefferies
1970	WUSA	Art director	Credited as Philip Jefferies
1971	Sometimes a Great Notion	Art director	Credited as Philip Jefferies
1972	The Cowboys	Production designer	Credited as Philip Jefferies
1972	Every Little Crook and Nanny	Production designer	
1972	Conquest of the Planet of the Apes	Production designer	Uncredited; Credited as Philip Jefferies
1973	Tom Sawyer	Production designer	Credited as Philip Jefferies
1974	Huckleberry Finn	Production designer	Credited as Philip Jefferies
1975	Walking Tall Part 2	Art director	Credited as Philip Jefferies
1975	Train Ride to Hollywood	Art director	
1976	Ode to Billy Joe	Production designer Art director	Uncredited as production designer Credited as Philip Jefferies
1976	St. Ives	Production designer	
1977	The Island of Dr. Moreau	Production designer	Credited as Philip Jefferies
1977	Beyond Reason	Production designer	Credited as Phil Jefferies
1978	Damien: Omen II	Production designer	
1978	Grease	Production designer	Credited as Phil Jefferies
1980	When Time Ran Out...	Production designer	
1981	Caveman	Production designer	
1981	First Monday in October	Production designer	
1982	An Officer and a Gentleman	Production designer	
1982	Kiss Me Goodbye	Production designer	
1984	Mass Appeal	Production designer	
1985	The Mean Season	Production designer	Credited as Philip Jefferies

Television
Year	Title	Role	Notes
1963	Saints and Sinners	Art director	Credited as Phil Jefferies; Episode 17: "New Lead Berlin"
1965	I Dream of Jeannie	Art director	Season 1 episode 1: "The Lady in the Bottle"
1966-1968	Peyton Place	Art director	Credited as Philip Jefferies; 164 episodes
1974	Trapped Beneath the Sea	Art director	Television film
1976	The Dark Side of Innocence	Art director	Television film
1978	The Pirate	Art director	Miniseries
1981	Isabel's Choice	Art director	Television film
1985	Alice in Wonderland	Production designer	Television film
1986	Act of Vengeance	Production designer	Television film Credited as Philip Jefferies
