= The Slipper and the Rose (musical) =

Musical by the Sherman Brothers and Bryan Forbes

The Slipper and the Rose - The Story of Cinderella
- Music: Richard M. Sherman; Robert B. Sherman
- Lyrics: Richard M. Sherman; Robert B. Sherman
- Book: Robert B. Sherman & Richard M. Sherman and Bryan Forbes; Stage adaptation by Philip Burley
- Basis: The Slipper and the Rose (1976)
- Productions: 2000 Epsom, UK; 2001 Wolverhampton; 2004 Salt Lake City, Utah; 2008 Cornwall; 2008 Tacoma, Washington; 2011 York; 2011 Montreal, Quebec, 2013 Liverpool

The Slipper and the Rose – The Story of Cinderella is a musical composed and with lyrics by Richard M. Sherman and Robert B. Sherman and a book by Bryan Forbes, Robert B. Sherman and Richard M. Sherman. It is based on the classic Charles Perrault version of the fairy tale Cinderella. Originally made as a musical film in 1976, it was adapted for the stage in 1984 by Philip Burley.

== Plot ==
Cinderella has been forced into servitude by her stepmother, who wishes to elevate her own two daughters in society. Prince Edward of Euphrania unsuccessfully searches for a bride. He holds a bride-finding ball, where he falls in love with Cinderella, whose wish to attend the ball is fulfilled magnificently by her magical fairy godmother. Cinderella flees the ball before the magic expires at midnight, leaving behind a slipper. Later, Prince Edward finds her by fitting the slipper to all the young women in the kingdom. They marry.

== Characters ==
- Cinderella
- Prince Edward
- the Stepmother
- the King
- the Queen
- the Dowager Queen
- the Fairy Godmother
- the Lord High Chamberlain
- John, the Prince Edward's valet and friend
- the Duke of Montague, cousin to the Prince
- Isobella, Stepsister
- Palatine, Stepsister

== Synopsis of Scenes ==
Act I

- Prologue - Graveyard/Palace stable yard
- Scene 1 - Interior of Cinderella's House
- Scene 2 - Interior of Palace
- Scene 3 - Graveyard
- Scene 4 - Cinderella's Kitchen
- Scene 5(a) - Field
- Scene 5 - Interior of Palace
- Scene 6 - Hallway of Cinderella's House
- Scene 7(a) - A Bedroom at the Palace (insert)
- Scene 7(b) - Interior of Dress Shop (insert)
- Scene 8 - Cinderella's Kitchen
- Scene 8(b) - Fairy Godmother's Hideaway (insert)

Act II

- Scene 1 - Interior of Palace
- Scene 1(b) - Field
- Scene 2 - Hallway of Cinderella's House
- Scene 3 - Interior of Palace
- Scene 3(a) - Street
- Scene 4 - Interior of palace
- Scene 5 - Field
- Scene 5(a) - A Bedroom at the Palace (insert)
- Scene 6 - Interior of Palace
- Scene 7 - Faraway
- Scene 8 - The Cathedral

== Songs ==
- Overture
- "Why Can't I Be Two People?"
- "What Has Love Got to Do With Getting Married?"
- "Once I Was Loved"
- "What a Comforting Thing to Know"
- "Protocoligorically Correct"
- "Bride-Finding Ball"
- "Suddenly It Happens"
- "The Slipper and the Rose Waltz Theme" (an instrumental version of "He Danced With Me")
- "Secret Kingdom"
- "He Danced With Me/She Danced With Me"
- "Position and Positioning"
- "Tell Him Anything (But Not That I Love Him)"
- "I Can't Forget the Melody"
- "Secret Kingdom (Reprise)"

== Productions ==
=== United Kingdom ===
Epsom Light Opera Company staged the premiere of the musical from 10 to 14 October 2000 at Epsom Playhouse, directed by Philip Burley. Later UK productions have included stagings in 2001 by the Bilston Operatic Company in Wolverhampton, in May 2008 at the Minack Theatre in Cornwall, in April 2011 at the York Theatre Royal, and in November 2013 by BOST Musicals at the Liverpool Empire Theatre.

=== North America ===
==== United States ====
The musical was given its US premiere in February 2005 at the Hale Center Theatre in West Valley City, Utah. A production ran in November to December 2008 at the Tacoma Musical Playhouse in Tacoma, Washington.

==== Canada ====
The Slipper and the Rose was staged in 2011 by Productions Coracole at the Beaubois Theatre in Montreal, Quebec.

== See also ==
- The Slipper and the Rose (1976 film)
- National Operatic and Dramatic Association
