= Konrad Johannes Karl Büttner =

- Born: October 6, 1903; Westendorf, Prussia, German Empire
- Died: November 14, 1970 (aged 67); New Haven, Connecticut, U.S.
- Education: University of Kiel
- Scientific career
- Workplaces: University of Kiel

Konrad Johannes Karl Büttner, or Buettner (October 6, 1903 – November 14, 1970) was a German-American meteorologist, bioclimatologist and university professor.

== Life and times ==
Büttner was born in Westendorf, in the province of Hannover, Germany and died in New Haven, Connecticut. He was a Protestant, married and had one child. His father was John Samuel Julius Büttner and his mother was Emilie Henriette Elisabeth Büttner née Kreuser.

== Education ==
From 1917 to 1922, he attended the Gymnasium high school at Schulpforte. From 1922 to 1926, Büttner studied geophysics, physics and mathematics in Erlangen, Hanover and Göttingen. In 1927, he completed a doctorate degree at the University of Göttingen and published his thesis: "Experiments on the penetrating radiation" and was awarded the Dr. Phil.

In 1934, he completed the habilitation treatise titled: "The heat transfer by conduction and convection, evaporation and radiation in Bioklimatologie and Meteorology", at the University of Kiel. He became head of the Bioclimatic Research Centre at the University of Kiel.

== Academic appointments ==
From 1927 to 1931, Büttner had a scholarship for Meteorology in Potsdam and was a fellow of the Emergency Association of German Science. From 1931 until 1934, he was scientific assistant for Meteorology as Assistant Professor and Head of the Bioclimatic Research Centre in Kiel. While at Kiel, from 1939 to 1947, he was lecturer for Meteorology and Geophysics. In January 1947, Büttner received an extraordinary professorship of Meteorology at the University of Kiel.

== Nazi Party ==
- 1933 - 1945, Sturmabteilung (SA), member
- 1933 - 1945, National Socialist German Workers' Party, member

During World War II, Büttner was attached to the Medical Department of the Medical Research Institute for Graf Zeppelins active in Stuttgart-Ruit, previously the Luftwaffe main testing ground at the Rechlin–Lärz Airfield. Büttner lectured as government medical officer at the sessions on medical issues in distress and death in winter on October 26 and 27, 1942.

== Operation Paperclip ==
In 1947, Büttner was recruited for Operation Paperclip and was first granted a leave of absence from teaching in Kiel and resigned in December 1950 from the University. Büttner went to the United States at Randolph Air Force Base, School of Aviation Medicine. From 1947 until 1953, he was research scientist for meteorology at the School of Medicine Aviation at Randolph Air Force Base in Texas.

== University of Washington in Seattle ==
From 1953 until his death in 1970, Büttner was professor for Meteorology and Physiology in the Department of Atmospheric Sciences at the University of Washington in Seattle in Seattle, Washington. Chairman of the department was Philemon Edwards Church and graduate program advisor was Robert Guthrie Fleagle. At Seattle in the Graduate School, Department of Atmospheric Sciences (formerly Meteorology and Climatology), for the school year 1963-1965, the catalog listed the courses taught by Buettner as: microclimatology, applied meteorology and bioclimatology, the upper atmosphere, atmospheric electricity, atmospheric radiation.

As per the graduate school catalog, Graduate course descriptions are as follows:

- Applied meteorology and bioclimatology - interrelationship of meteorology and climatology to: human health and heat balance, aviation medicine and space medicine, air pollution, agriculture, forestry, transportation, etc.
- The upper atmosphere - structure, composition, and dominant physical and photochemical processes. Sound propagation, aurora, air glow, ionosphere, and Van Allen belts. Role of the sun. Exosphere and planetary atmospheres.
- Atmospheric electricity - formation and disappearance of atmospheric ions. Normal air electrical field. Lightning and its causes. Earth magnetic field.
- Atmospheric radiation - solar spectrum. Atmospheric scattering, spectra of water vapor and other gases. Albedo of earth and atmosphere. Radiative heat balance.

== Publications ==
- Buettner, Konrad. (1931). Radiation effects on man in space. Bull. Amer. Meteorol. Society. 3:, 183.
- Büttner, K. (1932). Physical considerations regarding conservation of heat in man, especially loss of heat by conduction. Klinische Wochenschrift. 11: 1508-1509.
- Büttner, Konrad Johannes Karl. (1934). Die Wärmeübertragung durch Leitung und Konvektion, Verdunstung und Strahlung in Bioklimatologie und Meteorologie. Springer.

=== 1950s ===
- Buettner, K. J., & Haber, H. (1952). The aeropause. Science. 115: 656-657.
- Buettner, K. J. (1953). Tolerance Time. In Proceedings of a symposium on frontiers of man-controlled flight: presented at Los Angeles, California, April 3, 1953, by the Institute of Transportation and Traffic Engineering and University Extension, University of California, in collaboration with the Aero-Medical Engineering Association and the Institute of the Aeronautical Sciences, Los Angeles Section (p. 7).
- Buettner, K. J. (1954). Thermal stresses in the modern aircraft. Archiv für Meteorologie, Geophysik und Bioklimatologie, Serie B, 5(3-4), 377-387.
- Hubley, R. C., & Buettner, K. J. (1955). Juneau Ice Field Research Project. Alaska. 1954. American Geographical Society. New York.
- Hubley, R. C. (1957). An analysis of surface energy during the ablation season on Lemon Creek Glacier, Alaska. Eos, Transactions American Geophysical Union, 38(1), 68-85.
- Büttner, K. J. (1958). Die Aufnahme von Wasserdampf durch menschliche Haut, Pflanze und Erdboden. Archiv für Meteorologie, Geophysik und Bioklimatologie, Serie B, 9(1), 80-85.
- Buettner, K. J. (1958). Sorption by the earth surface and a new classification of kata-hydrometeoric processes. Journal of Meteorology, 15(2), 155-163.
- Buettner, K. J. (1959). Diffusion of liquid water through human skin. Journal of Applied Physiology, 14(2), 261-268.
- Buettner, K. J. (1959). Diffusion of water vapor through small areas of human skin in normal environment. Journal of Applied Physiology, 14(2), 269-275.
- Buettner, K. J., & Holmes, Frederick F. (1959). Diffusion of water vapor through human skin in hot environment and with application of atropine. Journal of Applied Physiology, 14(2), 276-278.

=== 1960s ===
- Thyer, Norman, & Buettner, K. J. (1961). On valley and mountain winds II. University of Washington, Department of Meteorology and Climatology.
- Buettner, K. J. (1962). Human aspects of bioclimatological classification. Biometeorology. SW Tromp (ed.), Pergamon Press, 0xford, 128-1.
- Buettner, K. J., & Thyer, N. (1962). Valley Winds in Mt. Rainier National Park. Weatherwise, 15(2), 63-67.
- Thyer, N., & Buettner, K. J. (1962). On Valley and Mountain Winds III. Valley Wind Theory/by Norman Thyer; Prepared for Geophysics Research Directorate, Air Force Cambridge Laboratories. University of Washington.
- Buettner, K. J. (1963). The Moon's first decimeter. Planetary and Space Science, 11(2), 135-148.
- Büttner, K. J. (1963). Regenortung vom wettersatelliten mit hilfe von zentimeterwellen. Naturwissenschaften, 50(18), 591-592.
- Buettner, K. J., & Kern, Clifford D. (1963). Infrared emissivity of the Sahara from TIROS data. Science, 142(3593), 671-672.
- Charlson, Robert J., & Buettner, K. J. (1963). The investigation of some techniques for measurement of humidity at high altitudes (No. SR-1). University of Washington Seattle.
- Charlson, Robert J., & Büttner, K. J. (1964). Liquid Film Hygrometry: Contract No. AF19 (628)-303, Project No. 6020, Task. Department of Atmospheric Sciences, University of Washington.
- Buettner, K. J., Maykut, G., Turner, J., & Zimmerman, J. (1964). OROGRAPHIC DEFORMATION OF WIND FLOW. University of Washington Seattle
- Buettner, K. J. (1964). Skin Exposure Studies (water Transfer Through Human Skin). University of Washington Seattle
- Buettner, K. J. (1965). Affected by Water Transfer. J. Soc. Cosmetic Chemists, 16, 133-143.
- Buettner, K. J. (1965). On the transfer function of human skin. University of Washington Seattle
- Buettner, K. J., & Thyer, N. (1965). Valley winds in the Mount Rainier area. Archiv für Meteorologie, Geophysik und Bioklimatologie, Serie B, 14(2), 125-147.
- Buettner, K. J., & Kern, C. D. (1965). The determination of infrared emissivities of terrestrial surfaces. Journal of Geophysical Research, 70(6), 1329-1337.
- Buettner, K. J., Robbins, Eyelyne, Crichlow, Jean, Pitts, Margaret, & Jones, David. (1966). WATER TRANSFER THROUGH HUMAN SKIN. University of Washington Seattle DEPT OF ATMOSPHERIC SCIENCES.
- Buettner, K. J., & Kreiss, William T. (1968). Discussion of paper by S.F. Singer and GF Williams Jr., Microwave detection of precipitation over the surface of the ocean. Journal of Geophysical Research. 73(22): 7145.
- Katsaros, Kristina & Buettner, K. J. (1969). Influence of rainfall on temperature and salinity of the ocean surface. Journal of Applied Meteorology, 8(1), 15-18.

== Patents ==
- Humidity Sensing Devices. U.S. Patent No. 3,315,518.
