= An Adventure in Color/Mathmagicland =

- Walt Disney's Wonderful World of Color episode
- Episode no.: Season 8 Episode 1
- Directed by: Hamilton Luske; Wolfgang Reitherman (sequence director); Les Clark (sequence director); Joshua Meador (sequence director)
- Written by: Bill Berg; Joe Rinaldi; Milt Banta; Larry Clemmons; Otto Englander; Dr. Heinz Haber
- Original air date: September 24, 1961

Episode chronology
← Previous "The Title Makers/Nature's Half Acre"	Next → "The Horsemasters: Follow Your Heart"

"An Adventure in Color/Mathmagicland" is the first episode of Disney's long-running anthology series to air in color. It premiered on September 24, 1961, as Walt Disney's Wonderful World of Color following the series' move from ABC to NBC. This show introduced a new character, Ludwig Von Drake, who provides an interesting lowdown on color (at one point performing "The Spectrum Song", all about different colors). By the end of the song, the NBC Peacock makes a brief cameo as a "color show-off". The kaleidoscopic intro to the show featured music composed by Richard M. Sherman and Robert B. Sherman. The second part of the show is the 1959 featurette Donald in Mathmagic Land.

The episode was partially created to help promote color televisions.

== Cast ==
- Walt Disney - Himself
- Paul Frees/Corey Burton (voice) - Ludwig Von Drake; the True Spirit of Adventure (also archive footage)
- Clarence Nash (voice) - Donald Duck (archive footage)
