= Our Friend the Atom =

- Disneyland episode
- Episode no.: Season 3 Episode 14
- Directed by: Hamilton S. Luske
- Teleplay by: Milt Banta
- Editing by: Lloyd Richardson
- Original air date: January 23, 1957
- Running time: 53 minutes

"Our Friend the Atom" is a 1957 episode of the television series Disneyland describing the benefits of nuclear power and hosted by Heinz Haber. It was part of the publicity campaign for peaceful uses of atomic energy, following Dwight D. Eisenhower's "Atoms for Peace" speech at the UN General Assembly in December 1953. The episode was broadcast by ABC on January 23, 1957, and repeated on April 24 of the same year.

In 1956, Simon and Schuster published a children's book by Haber, The Walt Disney Story of Our Friend the Atom, using artwork styled from the show.

== Educational film ==
In 1980, an updated version called The Atom: A Closer Look was released by Disney's educational media division.

== Production team ==
=== Animation ===
- Jack Boyd
- Cliff Nordberg
- John Lounsbery
- Jack Campbell
- Jack Buckley
- Ed Parks

=== Animation Art Styling ===
- Claude Coats
- John Hench

=== Layout ===
- Al Zinnen
- Thor Putnam

=== Backgrounds ===
- Jimi Trout
- Irv Wyner

=== Special Processes ===
- Ub Iwerks
- Eustace Lycett

== Worldwide releases ==
This episode was aired on TV in Japan as a standalone show on January 1, 1958 between 1pm and 2pm on Nippon Television.

When the series Disneyland aired on the same channel between August 1958 and April 1972, this episode wasn't aired.

== Home media ==
The episode was released on May 18, 2004 on Walt Disney Treasures: Tomorrow Land.
