= Dream West =

- Genre: Historical novel-based Drama
- Based on: Dream West by David Nevin
- Written by: Evan Hunter
- Directed by: Dick Lowry
- Starring: Richard Chamberlain; Ben Johnson; Rip Torn
- Theme music composer: Fred Karlin
- Country of origin: United States
- Original language: English
- No. of episodes: 3

Production
- Executive producer: Chuck McLain
- Producer: Hunt Lowry
- Cinematography: Robert M. Baldwin; David Eggby; Jack Wallner
- Editors: Byron "Buzz" Brandt; Jack Fegan; Dennis Mosher
- Running time: 337 minutes
- Production company: Sunn Classic Pictures

Original release
- Network: CBS
- Release: April 13 – April 20, 1986

Dream West is a 1986 American television miniseries starring Richard Chamberlain and directed by Dick Lowry.

== Development ==
The seven-hour miniseries was broken into three parts (2 hours, 2 hours, and 3 hours). Part 1 aired on Sunday, April 13, 1986. It was the 16th most-watched show of that week. Part 2 had been intended to follow the next day, but was postponed a day until April 15 due to a press conference by President Ronald Reagan about Libya (see 1986 United States bombing of Libya). Part 3 was moved to Sunday, April 20. Part 2 was the 15th most watched television show for its week, and Part 3 came in 8th place.

== Plot ==
The film was based on the 1984 novel of the same name by David Nevin, based on the life of 19th century explorer and politician John C. Frémont.

== Cast ==
- Richard Chamberlain as John Charles Fremont
- Alice Krige as Jessie Benton Fremont
- F. Murray Abraham as President Abraham Lincoln
- René Enríquez as General Castro
- Ben Johnson as Jim Bridger
- Jerry Orbach as Capt. John Sutter
- G. D. Spradlin as General Steven Watts Kearney
- Rip Torn as Kit Carson
- Fritz Weaver as Senator Thomas Hart Benton
- Anthony Zerbe as Bill Williams
- Claude Akins as Tom Fitzpatrick
- John Anderson as Brig. Gen. Brooke
- Lee Bergere as 'Papa Joe' Nicollet
- Jeff East as Tim Donovan
- Michael Ensign as Karl Preuss
- Mel Ferrer as Judge Elkins
- Gayle Hunnicutt as Mrs. Maria Crittenden
- Buck Taylor as Egloffstein

== Reception ==
The Encyclopedia of Television Film Directors (2009) refers to the film as a "bracing yet relatively little remembered miniseries."

The film was released on DVD as part of the Warner Archive Collection in 2012.
