= Jesse Vint =

American film actor

Jesse Lee Vint
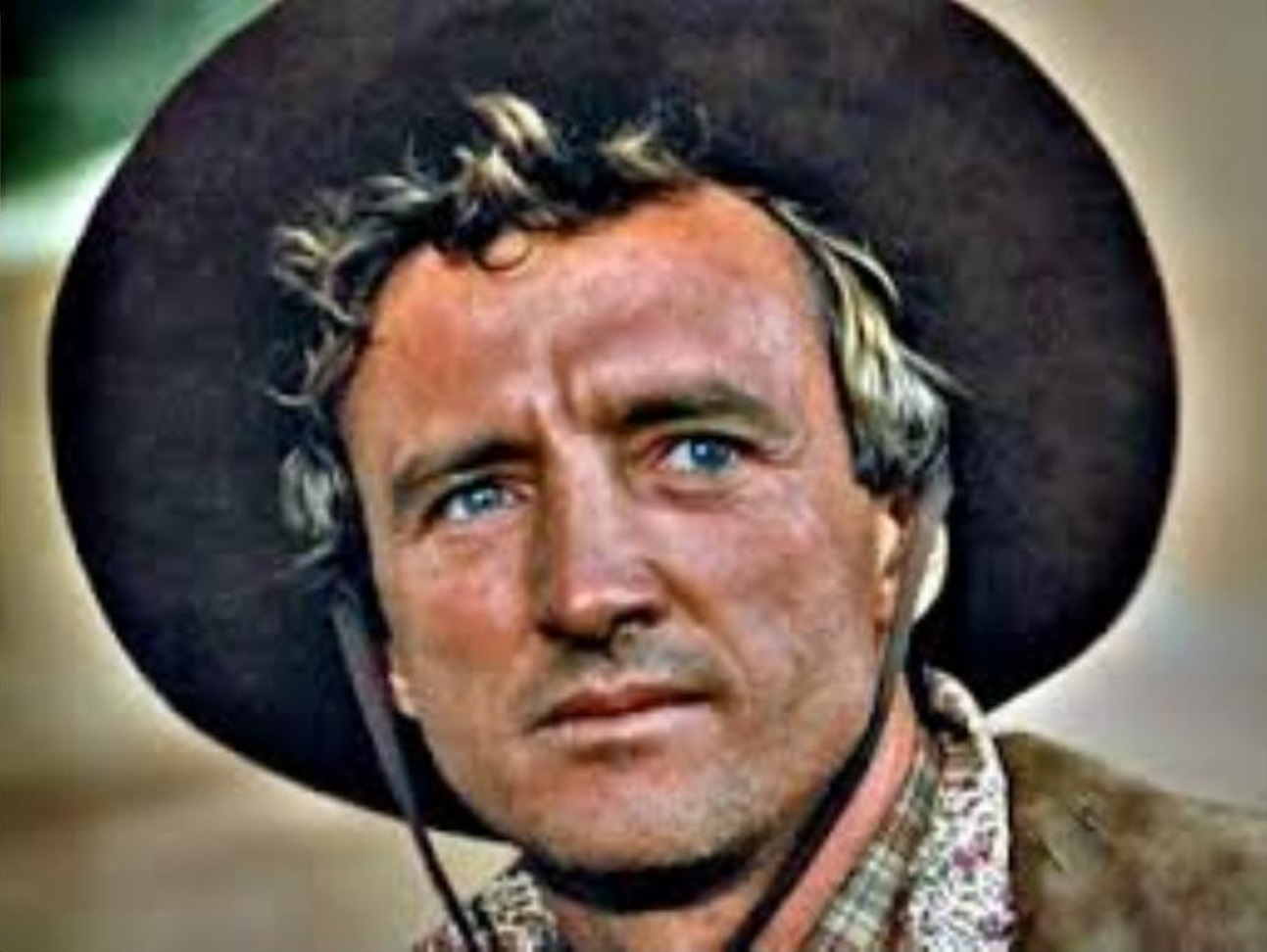
- Occupation: Actor

Signature
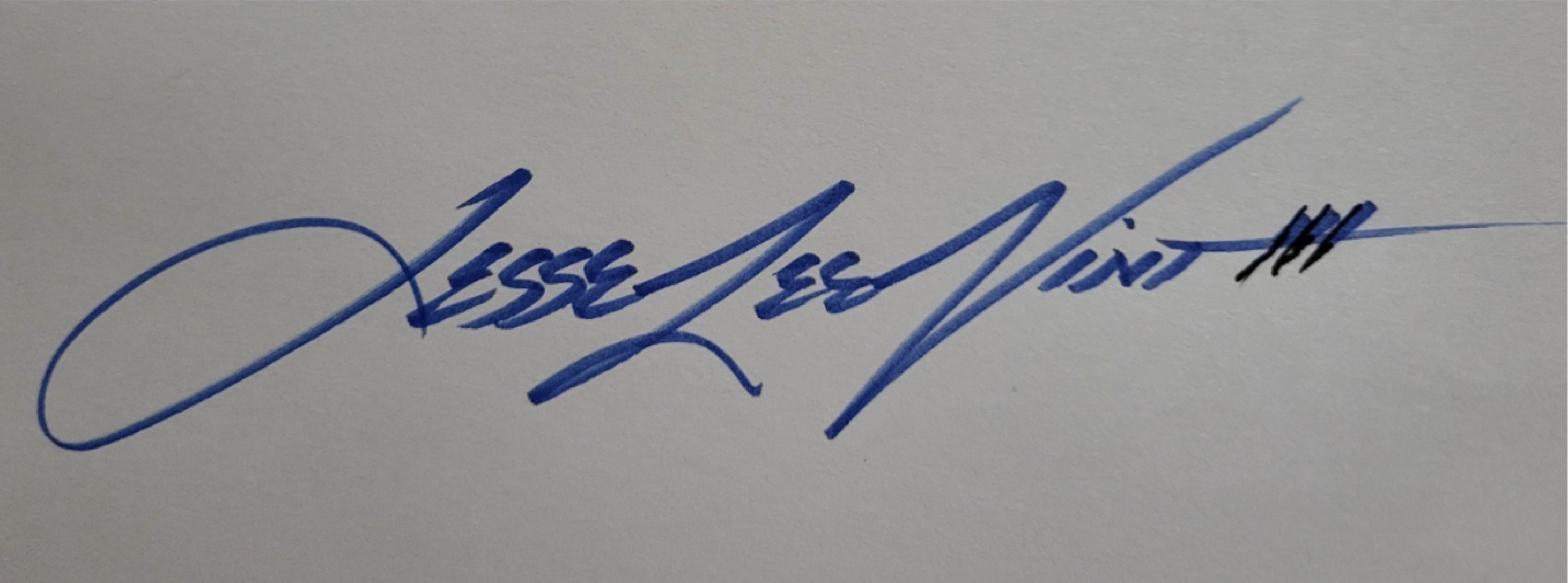

Jesse Lee Vint III is an American actor, film director and screenwriter. He acted in the films Silent Running (1972), Macon County Line (1974), Black Oak Conspiracy (1977) and Forbidden World (1982).

== Life and career ==
Vint was born and raised in Tulsa, Oklahoma. He graduated from the Oklahoma Military Academy and later attended the University of Oklahoma where he became a lifetime member of the Phi Gamma Delta fraternity.

Vint’s mother, Paula Mae Rhodes Vint, was Scotch, Irish, and English while his father, Jesse Lee Vint Jr., was Austrian, German, Irish and Norman French.

Vint’s uncle, Edward Lee Vint, was a Texas Congressman that represented Austin County in the late 1930s.

Jesse Vint's father, Jesse L. Vint Jr., was the president of Unit Rig & Equipment Co., the second largest company in Tulsa, Oklahoma, working there from 1956 to 1982. Jerry A. Shelton dedicated a book in his honor called The Unit Rig Story.

Vint joined the Actors Studio in Los Angeles with his brother Alan (who later co-starred with him in Macon County Line, as well as Earthquake). While at the Actors Studio, Vint was seen by Bruce Dern, who recommended him for his 1972 film Silent Running. Vint has worked with directors Arthur Penn in Little Big Man and Roman Polanski in Chinatown.

Vint worked with David Carradine in three movies. In Carradine's autobiographical book Kill Bill: The Diary, Carradine described Jesse Vint as "an acting buddy of mine who is a very wise and cool dude," even though they were usually cast as rivals.

In addition to his work in the film industry, Vint won the World Celebrity Chess Championship at The Century Plaza Hotel in 1988.

In 2016, Vint was awarded a Lifetime Achievement Award by the Portland Indie Film Awards Ceremony at a sold-out event in Portland, Oregon.

Jesse Vint has been a lifetime voting member of the Academy of Motion Pictures Arts and Sciences (AMPAS) since 1982 and attends the Oscars frequently.

Jesse Vint was also inducted into the Oklahoma Hall of Fame along with his brother Alan Vint and the actor Ben Johnson in 2022.

Vint is also an author and has written several books: William the Conqueror vs. King Harold, The Brothers Reno, and The Film Actor’s Handbook.

Vint has a son named Jesse Lee Vint IV. He also has a grandson named Jesse Lee Vint V. Vint was married to Stephanie D. Pineo.

== Selected filmography ==
=== Actor ===
- One Life to Live (TV, 1969) - Al Roberts (1986, 1987)
- CBS Playhouse (TV, 1969) - Buck
- WUSA (1970) - Young Doctor (uncredited)
- The Bold Ones: The Senator (TV, 1970) - Pvt. Wilson
- Swing Out, Sweet Land (John Wayne TV special, 1970) - Colorado
- Little Big Man (1970) - Lieutenant
- Bonanza (TV, 1971) - Toby Harris
- The Bold Ones: The Lawyers (TV, 1971) - Officer Taylor
- Nichols (TV, 1971) - Charlie Springer
- Silent Running (1972) - John Keenan
- Owen Marshall: Counselor at Law (TV, 1971-1972) - Mechanic / Joe Boysen
- Mission: Impossible (TV, 1973) - Zinc
- Pigs (1973) - Sheriff Dan Cole
- The F.B.I. (TV, 1971-1973) - Desmond Murphy / George Shawn / Johnny Nesbitt
- Chopper One (TV, 1974) - Billy - 2nd Gunman
- Welcome to Arrow Beach (1974) - Hot Rod Driver
- The Godchild (1974) - Loftus (ABC Movie of the Week)
- Chinatown (1974) - Farmer in the Valley #2
- Macon County Line (1974) - Wayne Dixon
- The Rookies (TV, 1974) - Pete 'Wolf' Gray
- The Disappearance of Flight 412 (1974) - Scanner
- Cannon (TV, 1972-1974) - Al Sparling / Angel McIlhone
- Earthquake (1974) - Buck
- Reflections of Murder (1974) - Cop on Freeway
- Amy Prentiss (TV, 1974) - Factory Supervisor
- S.W.A.T. (TV, 1975) - Dallas
- Bug (1975) - Tom Tacker
- Bobbie Jo and the Outlaw (1976) - Slick Callahan
- Black Oak Conspiracy (1977) - Jingo Johnson
- Deathsport (1978) - Polna
- Emergency! (TV, 1978) - Paramedic Nick Halverson
- Centennial (TV miniseries, 1978) - Amos Calendar
- Fast Charlie... the Moonbeam Rider (1979) - Calvin Hawk
- Hometown U.S.A. (1979) - Motorcycle Leader
- The Incredible Hulk (TV, 1979) - Terry
- Belle Starr (TV movie, 1980) - Bob Dalton
- Walking Tall (TV, 1981) - Ben
- CHiPs (TV, 1981) - Daws
- Bret Maverick (TV, 1982) - Tulsa Jack Turner
- Forbidden World (1982) - Mike Colby
- Hart to Hart (TV, 1982) - Turk
- T.J. Hooker (TV, 1982) - Ben Edwards
- Dempsey (1983) - Bernie Dempsey
- The Yellow Rose (1984) - Matt Colby
- On the Line (1984) - El Jefe
- Cover Up (TV, 1985) - Willard
- Knight Rider (TV, 1985) - Hank Kagan
- Trapper John, M.D. (TV, 1985) - Ben Cassidy
- The A-Team (TV, 1986) - Insane Wayne
- Another Chance (1989)
- I Come in Peace (1990)
- The New Adam-12 (TV, 1991)
- Matlock (TV, 1992) - Tex
- The Young Riders (TV, 1992) - Cody Pierce / Pierson
- The Temp (1993) - Larry
- Deep Red (1994) - Det. Rhodes
- XXX's & OOO's (TV movie, 1994) - George Randall
- Deep Cover (1997) - Ray
- Dreamers (1999) - Carl
- Beyond Belief: Fact or Fiction (1999) - Detective
- Monkey Love (2002) - Les Roe
- Operation Balikatan (2003) - CIA Chief Spencer
- A-List (2006) - Red Carpet Star
- Sister Mary's Angel (2011) - Father Henry
- Grimm (TV, 2012) - Thom Carson
- Gloria Jesus (2014) - Pastor Kruger
- Bring Me the Head of Trapper Flint (2017) - Doctor Tulsa McCoy

=== Director/screenwriter ===
- Black Oak Conspiracy (1977)
- Hometown U.S.A. (1979)
- Another Chance (1989)
- The Killer Within Me (2002)
