= The World Showcase March =

Song
- Recorded: 1982
- Songwriter(s): Robert and Richard Sherman

"The World Showcase March" was written in 1982 for the Grand Opening of Epcot Center in Florida. It was written by the Academy Award winning songwriting team of Robert and Richard Sherman (who also wrote the similarly themed "It's a Small World" 19 years earlier). The World Showcase March was performed intermittently over the following few years.
