= Jeff East =

American actor

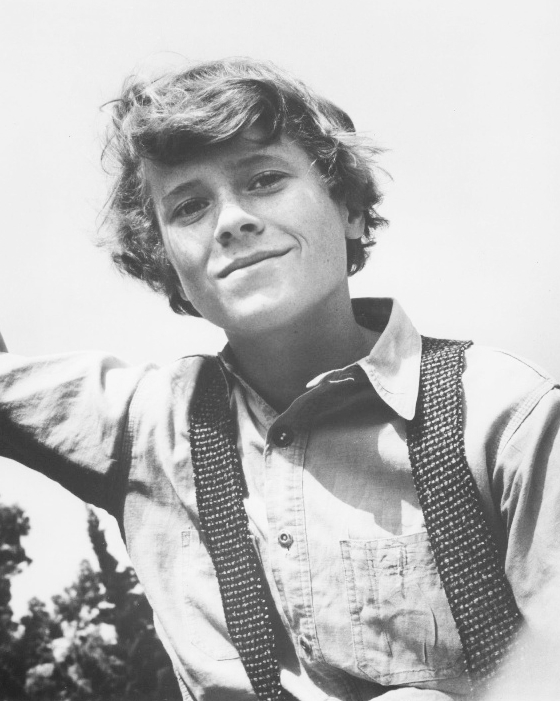
- East in 1972
- Born: Jeffrey Franklin East; October 27, 1957 (age 69); Kansas City, Missouri, U.S.
- Occupation: Actor
- Years active: 1973–2015
- Spouse: Lori Gates (divorced)
- Children: 2

Jeffrey Franklin East (born October 27, 1957) is an American retired actor. Beginning his professional acting career at the age of fourteen, East is known for his portrayal of Huckleberry Finn in the United Artists feature films Tom Sawyer (1973) and Huckleberry Finn (1974), as well as for his portrayal of a teenage Clark Kent in Richard Donner's Superman: The Movie (1978).

== Early life ==
East was born in Kansas City, Missouri, to parents Ira and Joan Ann East. His father worked in real estate and his mother was a homemaker. East grew up with three siblings: an older sister named Anne, an older brother named Ronald and a twin sister named Jane.

== Career ==
East's feature film credits include The Flight of the Grey Wolf (1974), Stranger in Our House (1978), Mary and Joseph: A Story of Faith (1979), Klondike Fever (1980), Deadly Blessing (1981), Up the Creek (1984), Dream West (1986), Pumpkinhead (1988), Another Chance (1989) and Deadly Exposure (1993).

Unbeknownst to East when the film was being made, his Superman dialogue was dubbed over by Christopher Reeve. East also starred in the 1983 television film The Day After. His TV guest appearances include M*A*S*H ("Settling Debts"), Otherworld and Shades of L.A.

== Personal life ==
In 1987, East became involved in real estate development with his father. In February 2004, he moved back to Kansas City to take over his father's commercial real estate company.

== Filmography ==
=== Film ===
Year	Title	Role	Notes
1973	Tom Sawyer	Huckleberry Finn	
1974	Huckleberry Finn	Huckleberry Finn	
1977	The Hazing	Craig Lewis	Alternate title: The Curious Case of the Campus Corpse
1978	Superman	Young Clark Kent	Dialogue dubbed by Christopher Reeve
1980	Klondike Fever	Jack London	
1981	Deadly Blessing	John Schmidt	
1984	Up the Creek	Rex Crandall	
1988	Pumpkinhead	Chris	
1989	Another Chance	Harlen	
1992	Blue Champagne	Sam	Video
1993	Deadly Exposure	Anderson	
2009	Misfortune Smiles	The Great Oswald	Short
2010	Last Breath	Dennis	
2015	Terminal	Becker	

=== Television ===
Year	Title	Role	Notes
1974	Return of the Big Cat	Josh McClaren	TV movie
1976	The Flight of the Grey Wolf	Russ Hanson	TV movie
1977	The Ghost of Cypress Swamp	Lonny Bascombe	TV movie
1978	Stranger in Our House	Peter Bryant	TV movie
1979	How the West Was Won	Orly	Episode: "The Rustler"
1979	Insight	Rob	Episode: "When, Jenny? When?"
1979	Mary and Joseph: A Story of Faith	Joseph	TV movie
1982	M*A*S*H	Lt. Pavelich	Episode: "Settling Debts"
1983	The Day After	Bruce Gallatin	TV movie
1984–1986	1st & Ten	Bryce Smith	13 episodes
1985	Otherworld	Rev	Episode: "Village of the Motorpigs"
1986	Dream West	Tim Donovan	Mini-series
1990	Shades of LA	Jack Dymond	Episode: "Some Like it Cold"
1991	The New Adam-12	Officer Carson	Episode: "D.A.R.E."
1992	Doogie Howser, M.D.	Mr. Fukes	Episode: "The Big Sleep... Not!"
