= Tom Sawyer (1973 film) =

1973 film directed by Don Taylor

- Theatrical release poster
- Directed by: Don Taylor
- Screenplay by: Robert B. Sherman; Richard M. Sherman
- Based on: The Adventures of Tom Sawyer; 1876 novel by Mark Twain
- Produced by: Arthur P. Jacobs; Frank Capra Jr.
- Starring: Johnny Whitaker; Celeste Holm; Jeff East; Warren Oates
- Cinematography: Frank Stanley
- Edited by: Marion Rothman
- Music by: Songs: Richard M. Sherman; Robert B. Sherman; Score: John Williams
- Production company: Reader's Digest
- Distributed by: United Artists
- Release date: March 15, 1973
- Running time: 104 minutes
- Country: United States
- Language: English
- Box office: $6,000,000 (rentals)

Tom Sawyer is a 1973 American musical film adaptation of the Mark Twain novel The Adventures of Tom Sawyer directed by Don Taylor. The film was produced by Reader's Digest in collaboration with Arthur P. Jacobs, and its screenplay and songs were written by the Sherman Brothers, Robert B. Sherman and Richard M. Sherman.

During the 46th Academy Awards, the film received three nominations for Best Original Song Score, Best Art Direction, and Best Costume Design, but failed to win any.

== Plot ==
Tom Sawyer and Huckleberry Finn, seeking adventure and superstition, skip school to attempt resurrecting a dead cat through an incantation they believe will be empowered by the imminent death of a man named Hoss Williams. During their escapade, they encounter Muff Potter, the town drunk. Their discussion is interrupted by Injun Joe, who informs them that Doc Robinson seeks their assistance to exhume Williams' body. Concurrently, Tom consistently evades school, weaving elaborate tales to excuse his absences at dinner. When Aunt Polly, his guardian, seeks to discipline him for his truancy, Tom cunningly persuades other children to undertake his punitive chores, demonstrating his mischievous and manipulative nature.

Following Williams' death, Tom and Huck visit the cemetery, only to discover Muff Potter and Injun Joe exhuming Williams' grave under Doc Robinson's orders. An altercation ensues when Joe demands additional payment, and in the ensuing chaos, Robinson inadvertently incapacitates Muff with a shovel. In a violent response, Joe strikes Robinson, knocking him into the grave, then fatally stabs him with Muff's knife. Horrified, Tom and Huck witness the entire event and flee the scene, binding themselves with a pact of silence over the gruesome murder they observed.

In the aftermath of the murder, Injun Joe deceitfully accuses Muff Potter of the crime, resulting in Muff's imprisonment. Concurrently, Tom Sawyer becomes infatuated with the newly arrived Becky Thatcher. During Muff's trial, as Injun Joe testifies with false claims, Tom, unable to bear the injustice, courageously reveals the true series of events on the stand, carefully omitting Huck's presence. In a dramatic turn, Injun Joe retaliates by hurling a knife at Tom, narrowly missing him, and then makes a daring escape through the courthouse window.

Post-trial, Tom and Becky's brief "engagement" dissolves when Becky learns of Tom's prior commitment to Amy Lawrence. Distraught, Tom finds himself at odds with Huck for violating their pact of secrecy. The boys, seeking escape and adventure, decide to run away together, journeying down the Mississippi River. Their expedition takes a perilous turn when a riverboat capsizes their raft, stranding them on an island. As they revel in their newfound freedom, they speculate about Injun Joe's fate. During their island sojourn, they observe a group conducting a river dragging, a technique involving cannon fire aimed to recover bodies submerged in the river.

Tom and Huck, yearning for home, return only to discover their own funeral in progress, presumed dead by the townsfolk. Their sudden appearance joyously interrupts the service, leading to a warm reception. Subsequently, the Widow Douglas adopts Huck, endeavoring to civilize him. During a subsequent Independence Day celebration, Tom and Becky's exploration of McDougal's Cave turns perilous when they encounter Injun Joe. A harrowing chase ensues, culminating in a dramatic confrontation with Judge Thatcher, Muff, and Huck. In the chaos, Muff throws a torch at Injun Joe, causing him to fall to his demise.

Some time after the tumultuous events, Huck vanishes, causing concern for the Widow Douglas. Tom, upon locating him at their favored fishing spot, chides Huck for his thoughtlessness. As Huck ponders his future, possibly setting the stage for his own adventures in Huckleberry Finn (1974 film), Tom returns to find Muff Potter preparing to leave town, hinting at a possible future reunion. Concurrently, Judge Thatcher arranges a two-week trip to St. Louis for Tom and Becky, offering a reprieve from recent events. Before departing, Tom mends relationships with his family and commits to personal improvement.

== Cast ==
- Johnny Whitaker as Tom Sawyer
- Jodie Foster as Becky Thatcher
- Jeff East as Huckleberry Finn
- Celeste Holm as Aunt Polly
- Warren Oates as Muff Potter
- Lucille Benson as Widder Douglas
- Henry Jones as Mr. Dobbins
- Noah Keen as Judge Thatcher
- Dub Taylor as Clayton
- Richard Eastham as Doc Robinson
- Sandy Kenyon as Constable Clemmens
- Joshua Hill Lewis as Cousin Sidney
- Susan Petrie as Cousin Mary
- Steve Hogg as Ben Rogers
- Sean Summers as Billy Fisher
- Kevin Jefferson as Joe Jefferson
- Page Williams as Saloon Girl
- James A. Kuhn as Blacksmith
- Mark Lynch as Prosecuting Attorney
- Jonathan Taylor as Small Boy
- Anne Voss as Girl
- Frederick Allen as a Hobo/Crying Man at the Funeral
- Kunu Hank as Injun Joe

Jodie Foster and Johnny Whitaker had starred together in Napoleon and Samantha the previous year.

== Production ==
The film was shot in Arrow Rock and Lupus, Missouri, with cave scenes filmed at Meramec Caverns in Stanton, Missouri.

As a Mormon, Whitaker was prohibited from using tobacco. In the scene in which Tom and Huck carve a pipe and smoke it together, cabbage leaves were substituted in place of the tobacco, at Whitaker's insistence.

The paddle–wheeled boat used in the film was the Julia Belle Swain, as of September 24, 2013 moored at Riverside Park in La Crosse, Wisconsin.

== Awards and nominations ==
At the 31st Golden Globe Awards, the Sherman Brothers, along with John Williams, received a nomination for Best Original Score. The trio would later be nominated for an Academy Award for Best Music, Scoring Original Song Score and/or Adaptation. Tom Sawyer also received Academy Award nominations for Best Art Direction–Set Decoration (Philip M. Jefferies, Robert De Vestel) and Best Costume Design (Donfeld).

== Songs ==
1. River Song (The Theme from “Tom Sawyer”) Charley Pride, Chorus & Orchestra
2. Tom Sawyer – Aunt Polly, Mary, Sidney
3. Gratifaction – Boys
4. How Come? – Tom
5. If'n I Was God – Tom
6. A Man's Gotta Be (What He's Born to Be) Tom, Huckleberry and Muff
7. Hannibal, Mo(Zouree) – Cast
8. Freebootin' – Tom, Huckleberry
9. Aunt Polly's Soliloquy – Aunt Polly
