= Lupus, Missouri =

- City
- Location in Moniteau County and the state of Missouri
- Coordinates: 38°50′46″N 92°27′14″W
- Country: United States
- State: Missouri
- County: Moniteau
- Incorporated: 1884

Area
  - Total: 0.19 sq mi (0.48 km^{2})
  - Land: 0.19 sq mi (0.48 km^{2})
  - Water: 0 sq mi (0.00 km^{2})
- Elevation: 577 ft (176 m)

Population (2020)
  - Total: 28
  - Density: 151.5/sq mi (58.49/km^{2})
- Time zone: UTC-6 (Central (CST))
  - Summer (DST): UTC-5 (CDT)
- ZIP code: 65046 (Jamestown)
- Area code: 660
- FIPS code: 29-44498
- GNIS feature ID: 2396728

Lupus is a city in Moniteau County, Missouri, United States. The population was 28 at the 2020 census. It is part of the Jefferson City metropolitan area.

== History ==
A post office called Lupus was established in 1884, and remained in operation until 1955. Lupus is a name derived from Latin meaning "wolf".

== Geography ==
Lupus is in northern Moniteau County, on the southwest bank of the Missouri River. It is bordered to the northeast, across the river, by Boone County. Lupus is 7 miles (11 km) north of Jamestown, which serves as the community's mailing address. The city of Columbia is 9 miles (14 km) to the northeast as the crow flies, but 32 miles (51 km) by highway, using the nearest crossing of the Missouri: Interstate 70 between Columbia and Boonville.

According to the U.S. Census Bureau, Lupus has a total area of 0.19 square miles (0.49 km^{2}), all land.

== Demographics ==
Historical population
Census	Pop.	Note	%±
1910	164		—
1920	148		−9.8%
1930	185		25.0%
1940	127		−31.4%
1950	97		−23.6%
1960	75		−22.7%
1970	68		−9.3%
1980	50		−26.5%
1990	39		−22.0%
2000	29		−25.6%
2010	33		13.8%
2020	28		−15.2%
U.S. Decennial Census

=== 2010 census ===
At the 2010 census, there were 33 people, 17 households and 7 families residing in the city. The population density was 173.7 inhabitants per square mile (67.1/km^{2}). There were 23 housing units at an average density of 121.1 per square mile (46.8/km^{2}). The racial makeup of the city was 97.0% White and 3.0% from two or more races.

There were 17 households, of which 11.8% had children under the age of 18 living with them, 29.4% were married couples living together, 5.9% had a female householder with no husband present, 5.9% had a male householder with no wife present, and 58.8% were non-families. 41.2% of all households were made up of individuals, and 17.6% had someone living alone who was 65 years of age or older. The average household size was 1.94 and the average family size was 2.71.

The median age in the city was 57.8 years. 12.1% of residents were under the age of 18; 6% were between the ages of 18 and 24; 9.1% were from 25 to 44; 57.7% were from 45 to 64; and 15.2% were 65 years of age or older. The gender makeup of the city was 51.5% male and 48.5% female.

=== 2000 census ===
At the 2000 census of 2000, there were 29 people, 18 households and 5 families residing in the town. The population density was 150.8 inhabitants per square mile (58.2/km^{2}). There were 24 housing units at an average density of 124.8 per square mile (48.2/km^{2}). The racial makeup of the town was 100.00% White.

There were 18 households, of which 16.7% had children under the age of 18 living with them, 16.7% were married couples living together, 16.7% had a female householder with no husband present, and 66.7% were non-families. 61.1% of all households were made up of individuals, and 22.2% had someone living alone who was 65 years of age or older. The average household size was 1.61 and the average family size was 2.50.

20.7% of the population were under the age of 18, 3.4% from 18 to 24, 10.3% from 25 to 44, 51.7% from 45 to 64, and 13.8% who were 65 years of age or older. The median age was 49 years. For every 100 females, there were 123.1 males. For every 100 females age 18 and over, there were 91.7 males.

The median household income was $18,750 and the median family income was $18,750. Males had a median income of $23,750 compared with $63,750 for females. The per capita income for the town was $19,341. None of the population and none of the families were below the poverty line.

== Arts and culture ==
The city is most well known for its chili festival, held every autumn, which draws over a thousand people from the surrounding area. The musical films Tom Sawyer and Huckleberry Finn, both based on Mark Twain's novels, were shot partially on location here. In 1976, the school of journalism at the University of Missouri published a book of photo essays on the history and the diminishing population of the city titled Lupus: portrait of a Missouri river town.
