= Black Oak Conspiracy =

1977 film

- Theatrical release poster
- Directed by: Bob Kelljan
- Screenplay by: Hugh Smith
- Story by: Jesse Vint
- Produced by: Tom Clark; Jesse Vint
- Starring: Jesse Vint; Karen Carlson; Albert Salmi; Seymour Cassel; Douglas Fowley; Robert F. Lyons
- Cinematography: Chris Ludwig
- Edited by: Jerry Garcia
- Music by: Don Peake
- Production company: New World Pictures
- Distributed by: New World Pictures
- Release date: April 20, 1977
- Running time: 92 minutes
- Country: United States
- Language: English
- Budget: $300,000

Black Oak Conspiracy is a 1977 American action film directed by Bob Kelljan and written by Hugh Smith. The film stars Jesse Vint, Karen Carlson, Albert Salmi, Seymour Cassel, Douglas Fowley and Robert F. Lyons. The film was released on April 20, 1977, by New World Pictures.

== Plot ==
Hollywood stuntman Jingo Johnson returns to his rural hometown of Black Oak to visit his seriously ill mother who is being cared for at a nursing home. He discovers that a mining company has bought his mother's farm and his childhood home. He also learns that his former girlfriend Lucy is now involved with Harrison Hancock, who works for the mining company. After breaking into the farm with Lucy's brother Homer, Jingo finds the farm has been demolished. He is confronted by Hancock and his men. A fight ensues and Jingo is told to leave by the Sheriff, Otis Grimes, who does not like Jingo and begins surveillance on him.

Jingo tries to reconcile with Lucy, who dreams of escaping her small-town existence and does not want to renew their relationship. He learns that the farm was bought by the nursing home, which is owned by Hancock's father, and that two other local landowners are also patients there. Jingo finds out that Sheriff Grimes is particularly interested if Jingo makes contact with his mother's nurse Beulah Barnes or Doctor Roades. He obtains some of his mother's pills from the nursing home and, after visiting Roades to find out what they are, he is attacked by Harrison Hancock and told to stop snooping around.

Jingo later confronts Harrison on his own and finds that Hancock senior wants him to leave town. He meets Lucy again and they leave together, spending the night in a barn. After his mother dies, Jingo discovers that the pills, supposedly antibiotics prescribes by Dr Roades, actually caused his mother's blood disease. The nursing home is at the center of Hancock senior and Grimes's plan to obtain land by killing off the owners. Grimes tells Hancock that he plans to kill the nurse and doctor and frame Jingo for their murders. When Hancock protests Grimes kills him, and then Harrison. Nurse Barnes witnesses the killings and raises the alarm. Jingo finds Grimes at the mine workings, and, after an extended confrontation, Jingo prevails and Sheriff Grimes is arrested. Jingo leaves town with Lucy to return to Hollywood.

== Cast ==
- Jesse Vint as Jingo Johnson
- Karen Carlson as Lucy Metcalf
- Albert Salmi as Sheriff Grimes
- Seymour Cassel as Homer Metcalf
- Douglas Fowley as Bryan Hancock
- Robert F. Lyons as Harrison Hancock
- Mary Charlotte Wilcox as Beulah Barnes
- Janus Blythe as Melba Barnes
- Jeremy Foster as Billie Bob
- Peggy Stewart as Virginia Metcalf
- Joanne Strauss as Sadie Grimes
- Vic Perrin as Mr. Finch
- Darby Hinton as Miner at cafe
- Dana Derfus as Miner
- Rock A. Walker as Policeman
- Buff Brady as Policeman
- Stephanie Pineo as Kazoo Band Leader

== Production ==
Finance was raised in Tulsa and the film was shot in north California. The film was picked up for distribution by New World.
