= Another Chance (film) =

- UK DVD artwork
- Directed by: Jesse Vint
- Written by: Roger Camras; Jesse Vint
- Produced by: Roger Camras
- Starring: Bruce Greenwood; Vanessa Angel; Frank Annese; Jeff East; Barbara Edwards; Bernard Behrens; Anne Ramsey
- Cinematography: Richard C. Glouner
- Edited by: Mario Di Gregorio
- Music by: Ron Bloom
- Distributed by: Moviestore Entertainment
- Release date: 5 May 1989
- Running time: 99 minutes
- Country: United States

Another Chance is a 1989 film co-written and directed by Jesse Vint and starring Bruce Greenwood and Vanessa Angel.

== Premise ==
A womanizing soap opera star John Ripley meets the beautiful Jackie. She is a client of his agent and best friend Russ Wilder. After enjoying a great relationship with her, he cheats and then realizes that he hits rock bottom. He then tries to get back what he lost.

== Principal cast ==
Actor	Role
Bruce Greenwood	John Ripley
Vanessa Angel	Jackie Johanson
Frank Annese	Russ Wilder
Jeff East	Harlen
Robert Sacchi	Mickey 'Bogart' Pinco
Allan Rich	J.R. Jacobs
Karen Witter	Nancy Burton
Anne Ramsey	Leadlady
Barbara Edwards	Diana
Bernard Behrens	St. Peter
