= The Spectrum Song =

Song by Paul Frees as Ludwig Von Drake
- Released: 1961
- Genre: Disney song, children's song
- Composers: Richard M. Sherman, Robert B. Sherman

"The Spectrum Song" was written by the Sherman Brothers in 1961 under assignment from Walt Disney to be a signature song for the fictional character Ludwig Von Drake. Nominally about different colors in the spectrum, the song's lyrics initially consist of the repeated color names red, yellow, green and blue, but soon veer wildly off into cerise, chartreuse, ultramarine and plaid.

== Origin and purpose ==
The song was introduced in the cartoon segment "An Adventure in Color," which first aired on September 24, 1961 as part of the first-ever NBC episode of the newly renamed TV program, Walt Disney's Wonderful World of Color. The episode also introduced the Von Drake character. The cartoon tied in with a live action segment about color television and, like the song itself, was part of Disney's wider plan to promote the program in its new color format.

The NBC premiere also introduced another song by the Sherman Brothers, "Wonderful World of Color (Main Title)". The Shermans had joined the Disney staff that same year (1961), having previously contributed music for Zorro and other Disney projects on a freelance basis.

== Content ==
Walt Disney and Ludwig Von Drake contemplate color

The song itself, sung by voice actor Paul Frees as Von Drake, was about different colors and color blending, and did not directly mention television. It did, however, quote from the lyrics of an earlier song, "Lavender Blue". After Von Drake is flummoxed by all the colors toward the end of the song, he says, "Whatever happened to just plain old 'Lavender Blue, dilly dilly,' dilly dilly... silly?"

The opening stanza of "The Spectrum Song" tied each color to a specific note in a major scale, similar to the color-coding of a toy xylophone. Thus, the word "red" corresponded to the tonic, or octave note (Do), yellow was the major third or mediant note (Mi) (and the fourth note, Fa), green was the perfect fifth or dominant note (So), and so on. The first four notes of the song thus formed a major chord, do-mi-so-do (red-yellow-green-red), a playful variant on the exercise of singing scales, similar to the Rodgers and Hammerstein song "Do-Re-Mi" from The Sound of Music. The Shermans thus compare colors to musical notes, stating in the lyric that "Color has its harmony".

== Recording history ==
A slightly different recording of "The Spectrum Song" was issued in 1961 on as a 45 RPM single on Disneyland Records (DBR-34), again with vocals by Frees as Von Drake. This second recording was reissued on Disc Three of the CD set The Music of Disney: A Legacy in Song (1992, ISBN 1-55723-248-2). The accompanying booklet for the set describes "The Spectrum Song" as "a clever play on words and colors" and obliquely mentions the musical reference to "Lavender Blue". The booklet also reproduces the picture sleeve of the original 45 RPM record. The song also appears on the Walt Disney Records compilation More Silly Songs (1998, ISBN 0-7634-0435-7)

In 2023, a newly orchestrated instrumental version of the song was added as part of the new music for the refurbished Mickey's Toontown section of Disneyland.
