= The Slipper and the Rose =

The Slipper and the Rose The Story of Cinderella
- US theatrical release poster
- Directed by: Bryan Forbes
- Screenplay by: Robert B. Sherman; Richard M. Sherman; Bryan Forbes
- Based on: "Cinderella" (folk tale)
- Produced by: Stuart Lyons
- Starring: Richard Chamberlain; Gemma Craven; Annette Crosbie; Edith Evans; Christopher Gable; Michael Hordern; Margaret Lockwood; Kenneth More
- Cinematography: Tony Imi
- Edited by: Timothy Gee
- Music by: Angela Morley
- Production company: David Paradine Productions
- Distributed by: Cinema International Corporation
- Release dates: 24 March 1976 (Royal Film Performance); 25 March 1976 (United Kingdom)
- Running time: 146 minutes
- Country: United Kingdom
- Language: English
- Budget: £2.15 million

The Slipper and the Rose: The Story of Cinderella is a 1976 British musical retelling the classic fairy tale of Cinderella. The film was chosen as the Royal Command Performance motion picture selection for 1976.

Directed by Bryan Forbes, the film stars Gemma Craven as the heroine, Richard Chamberlain as the prince, and features a supporting cast led by Michael Hordern, Kenneth More, Edith Evans, and Annette Crosbie. The film's Academy Award-nominated songs were written by the Sherman Brothers – Richard M. Sherman and Robert B. Sherman – who also shared scripting duties with Forbes.

== Plot ==
Prince Edward of Euphrania returns home after meeting the princess Selena of Carolsfeld, whom his parents have arranged for him to marry. However, Edward did not propose to Selena, and angrily denounces arranged marriages ("Why Can't I Be Two People?"). Edward prefers to marry for love while his parents want a political alliance ("What Has Love Got to Do with Being Married?").

Meanwhile, Cinderella's cruel stepmother has banished her to the cellar, and forces her to work as a servant to her and her two vindictive daughters, Isobella and Palatine. Cinderella finds some comfort in remembering happier times ("Once I Was Loved"). Whilst putting flowers by her parents' grave, she inadvertently stumbles upon the prince, and his friend and bodyguard John, who are visiting the Royal crypt. The Prince sardonically talks about his dead ancestors, with whom he will one day be buried ("What a Comforting Thing to Know").

Back at the castle, the King of Euphrania is advised that a marriage between Edward and a Princess from one of Euphrania's neighboring countries (and thus potential enemies) would help prevent war. A ball is seen as the perfect way to help Edward choose his bride ("Protocolligorically Correct"). The Prince hates the idea, though his cousin Montague is delighted ("Bride-finding Ball"). When news arrives that Carolsfeld intends to make war on Euphrania, Edward has no choice but to accept. However, fewer than half the princesses accept the invitation, so the local nobility, including Cinderella's stepmother and stepsisters, are invited.

Because of the lack of dresses at the dressmakers, the stepmother and stepsisters demand that Cinderella sew all three of them elegant gowns for the ball from the fabric of their old dresses. Cinderella has no idea what to do. As luck would have it a fairy godmother, who has a talent for sensing the wishes of those who are pure in heart, arrives and creates three beautiful gowns while Cinderella rests. That night, the stepmother and stepsisters depart for the ball leaving Cinderella alone. Cinderella's fairy godmother returns and informs Cinderella that she too can go to the ball. She transforms Cinderella's shabby dress into a lovely gown, arranges her hair in the period fashion, and a coach and horses are magically prepared. Cinderella is sent off to the ball with a warning that the magic can only last until midnight ("Suddenly It Happens"). It is love at first sight when Cinderella and Edward meet at the ball ("Secret Kingdom"). As the clock strikes midnight, Cinderella races away, leaving behind only her glass slipper ("He / She Danced With Me").

Edward sends his servants out far and wide in search of the woman who fits the glass slipper. The searchers return empty-handed. Edward builds a monument for the slipper and hopes that one day his lost love will turn up. John is also suffering as a result of love: he is in love with a noblewoman, but his position forbids them to be together ("Position and Positioning"). Edward knights John, so John can pursue his romance with Lady Caroline. Finally, frustrated by his fruitless search, Edward breaks the monument, tossing the slipper into the woods where Cinderella finds and starts to dance with it, which catches John's attention and he rushes off to inform the Prince.

Cinderella and Edward are reunited and greeted by her stepmother and stepsisters. Edward asks the permission of the stepmother to marry Cinderella and she gives full permission, if only to get Cinderella off her hands. Cinderella tells her stepmother and stepsisters that she forgives them for their abuse. In the throne room, Edward and Cinderella go before the King and Queen. Whilst the King and Queen find Cinderella to be charming, something seems to be troubling the King. He takes the Lord Chamberlain aside and tells him that there is no way his son and Cinderella, a non-royal, can be married. The Lord Chamberlain conveys this to Cinderella, explaining also that a military alliance through marriage must be established with one of the neighboring kingdoms to protect them against war and to secure the safety and future existence of Euphrania. Along with this disheartening news, it is also explained that she will have to be exiled that very night to avoid a war with Carolsfeld. Brokenhearted, Cinderella asks the Lord Chamberlain to tell Edward that she never loved him, because she knows that Edward will try to find her because of his love for her ("Tell Him").

After finding out what the King has done to Cinderella from John, an exasperated Edward confronts him for ruining his chances of a love and happy marriage. Realizing the situation at hand and how the King and Queen will not give up their stance on a political marriage, he agrees to marry whomever they choose, but says that his marital duties will go no further than the altar. He lays a curse that their royal house will die with him and throw Euphrania into chaos. The King now feels guilt over exiling Cinderella, but he had no choice due to his own fears of a war with Carolsfeld. On the day of his wedding, Edward begs Cinderella to forgive him for marrying Selena, unaware that the fairy godmother heard him. Cinderella living peacefully in exile in another country, still thinks of Edward ("I Can't Forget the Melody"). Her fairy godmother arrives and asks Cinderella why she isn't at the castle as Edward is getting married that day. Cinderella, surprised, asks who Edward is marrying. The fairy godmother does not know, as it's most certainly the wrong woman, but plans to set things right—again.

Back at the castle, as the wedding is taking place, everyone is surprised when Cinderella shows up in a wedding gown. The King interrupts the wedding and he and his council meet in private. The fairy godmother joins the discussion and convinces the king to change the law, so that Edward can marry the girl of his choice. In a surprising twist, Edward's cousin and the chosen bride fall in love at first sight, and marry, thus fulfilling the alliance after all. Cinderella and Edward live happily ever after.

== Cast ==
- Gemma Craven as Cinderella
- Richard Chamberlain as Prince Edward
- Margaret Lockwood as the Wicked Stepmother
- Michael Hordern as the King
- Lally Bowers as the Queen
- Edith Evans as the Dowager Queen
- Annette Crosbie as the Fairy Godmother
- Kenneth More as the Lord High Chamberlain
- Christopher Gable as John, the Prince Edward's bodyguard and friend
- Julian Orchard as the Duke of Montague, cousin to the Prince
- Rosalind Ayres as Isobella, Cinderella's Stepsister
- Sherrie Hewson as Palatine, Cinderella's Stepsister
- Polly Williams as Lady Caroline, lady-in-waiting to the Dowager Queen
- John Turner as the Major-Domo
- Keith Skinner as Willoughby, the Major-Domo's assistant
- Peter Graves as the General
- Fred as the Dog, the Fairy Godmother's pet

== Musical numbers ==
- "Why Can't I Be Two People?" – Richard Chamberlain
- "What Has Love Got to Do with Getting Married?" – Michael Hordern, Lally Bowers, Edith Evans, Julian Orchard
- "Once I Was Loved" – Gemma Craven
- "What a Comforting Thing to Know" – Richard Chamberlain, Christopher Gable
- "Protocoligorically Correct" – Michael Hordern, Chorus
- "Bride-finding Ball" – Richard Chamberlain, Julian Orchard
- "Suddenly It Happens" – Annette Crosbie, Gemma Craven
- "Transformation Ballet" – Dancers
- "The Slipper and the Rose Waltz Theme" (an instrumental version of "He Danced with Me")
- "Secret Kingdom" – Richard Chamberlain, Gemma Craven
- "He/She Danced with Me" – Richard Chamberlain, Gemma Craven
- "Position and Positioning" – Christopher Gable, Chorus
- "Tell Him Anything (But Not That I Love Him)" – Gemma Craven
- "I Can't Forget the Melody" – Gemma Craven
- "Secret Kingdom" (reprise) – Richard Chamberlain, Gemma Craven

In its initial US release, the songs "What Has Love Got to Do with Being Married" and "I Can't Forget the Melody" were cut. They were also excised from the North American soundtrack LP (MCA 2097). In 2003, conductor John Wilson included some of Morley's incidental music in a compilation album (Dutton Vocalion CDSA 6807) of her vast repertoire of music.

=== Charts ===
Chart position of the soundtrack
Chart (1976)	Position
Australia (Kent Music Report)	93

== Production ==
The film was entirely financed by the Sultan of Oman who wanted to invest in a film. The approached John Asprey who contacted Bryan Forbes and asked if he had a film. Forbes had just been approached by David Frost who had The Slipper and the Rose project. Forbes rewrote the script in ten days.

The film was announced in 1975 under the title The Story of Cinderella. Over 800 girls were considered for the part of Cinderella and around 150 were auditioned before Gemma Craven was chosen. "This girl is extraordinary," said Forbes.

=== Shooting ===
It was shot between England and Austria, some of the locations include: Salzburg and Anif Palace, Broughton Castle near Banbury in Oxfordshire and Southwark Cathedral in London.

Over 300 costumes were made for the film.

The scene where Cinderella sings "I Can't Forget the Melody", where she sits on a swing, is a reference to The Swing, a painting by Jean-Honoré Fragonard. Every detail of Cinderella's costume and setting are identical to Fragonard's painting, including the colour of her dress and the style of her hat.

Cinderella and the Prince dance the Ländler, a traditional Austrian dance, to their first waltz. (The same dance is also seen in The Sound of Music.)

It was Lockwood's first feature since 1955.

== Release ==
After premiering as Royal Film Performance on 24 March 1976, the film was released in the United Kingdom by Cinema International Corporation on 25 March and in the United States on 4 November by Universal Pictures.

At 24 March 1976 Royal Film Performance of The Slipper and the Rose the Queen Mother commented to the songwriters, "The waltz you wrote for the ballroom scene is the most beautiful song I've ever heard."

== Reception ==
"Very successful film," Forbes commented.

=== Critical ===
Writing in The New York Times, critic Vincent Canby said: "Mr. Forbes and Robert Sherman, authors of the screenplay, have stretched the fable without mercy, largely to accommodate a whole bunch of forgettable songs by the Shermans, who did very well by 'Mary Poppins' and 'Tom Sawyer,' but who, when off stride, as here, sound as if they're parodying the worst of the Broadway musical theater of the '50s." Canby added that as the Prince and Cinderella, "Mr. Chamberlain and Miss Craven have impossible roles that are less like characters in a fairy tale than pictures on a jar of peanut butter." Variety called it "an intelligent and happy blend of as pure an entertainment as has been seen here in some considerable time," with "fine performances by a splendid cast of British actors," particularly Michael Hordern, who "steals many a scene as the King, in one of his best performances ever."

Gene Siskel of the Chicago Tribune gave the film 3 stars out of 4 and wrote, "The songs aren't memorable, but the king and fairy godmother are." Charles Champlin of the Los Angeles Times stated, "The virtues of the movie, not necessarily in this order, are that it is richly produced, pleasantly witty, and graced by some colorful and engaging performances. It should earn some grown-up gratitude because it demonstrates that family fare does not have to be childish ... The defects are not such as to dent seriously the satisfaction of having so stylish and good-hearted a movie around. But it really is a familiar trip, however luxurious the vehicle, and the last 20 minutes or so seem very long and slow indeed."

Gary Arnold of The Washington Post wrote that the film "won't be remembered as one of the great musicals, but it's more diverting than I supposed," further noting that the script "does have agreeable outbursts of silliness and fancy. Michael Hordern as the worried, abstracted king and Annette Crosbie as Cinderella's brisk, humorous fairy godmother are consistently delightful." Brenda Davies of The Monthly Film Bulletin wrote, "The songs are not very memorable but they are enjoyable and appropriate in their context; the choreography too fits neatly into the plot but is not in itself particularly imaginative. But these shortcomings are abundantly outweighed by the wit and zest of both writing and playing."

=== Awards and nominations ===
Award	Category	Nominee(s)	Result
Academy Awards	Best Original Song Score and Its Adaptation or Adaptation Score	Song Score by Richard M. Sherman and Robert B. Sherman; Adapted by Angela Morley	Nominated
Academy Awards	Best Original Song	"He/She Danced with Me"; Music and Lyrics by Richard M. Sherman and Robert B. Sherman	Nominated
British Academy Film Awards	Best Actor in a Supporting Role	Michael Hordern	Nominated
British Academy Film Awards	Best Actress in a Supporting Role	Annette Crosbie	Nominated
British Academy Film Awards	Best Costume Design	Julie Harris	Nominated
British Academy Film Awards	Best Original Film Music	Richard M. Sherman and Robert B. Sherman	Nominated
British Academy Film Awards	Best Production Design/Art Direction	Raymond Simm	Nominated
Evening Standard British Film Awards	Best Actress	Annette Crosbie	Won
Golden Globe Awards	Best Foreign Film		Nominated
Golden Globe Awards	Best Original Score	Richard M. Sherman and Robert B. Sherman	Nominated
Saturn Awards	Best Fantasy Film		Nominated
Saturn Awards	Best Costume	Julie Harris	Nominated

== In popular culture ==
- In the 2006 London play, Frost/Nixon, playwright Peter Morgan makes reference to David Frost's involvement as executive producer on The Slipper and the Rose suggesting that Frost is more "entertainer" than serious journalist.

== Stage adaptations ==
The 1984 musical adaptation by Philip Burley, with songs by Richard M. Sherman and Robert B. Sherman, has been mounted often by British community theatre groups, including in 2001 by the Bilston Operatic Company, Wolverhampton, in May 2008 at the Minack Theatre in Cornwall, in 2011 at the York Theatre Royal, and in 2013 by BOST Musicals at the Liverpool Empire Theatre.

It made its North American premiere in 2005 at the Hale Center Theatre in West Valley City, Utah. Other productions were staged in 2008 at the Tacoma Musical Playhouse in Tacoma, Washington, and in 2011 by Productions Coracole at the Beaubois Theatre in Montreal, Quebec.

== Home video ==
MCA Discovision put out the film on Laserdisc in 1978. This release features monaural sound and a 1.33:1 pan and scanned transfer of the shorter US release with the songs "What Has Love Got to Do with Being Married" and "I Can't Forget the Melody" omitted. As it was never put out on VHS by MCA, the MCA Laserdisc was the only US video release of any kind prior to 2000, likely due to Universal's distribution rights lapsing and having reverted to production company Paradine.

In the UK and Australia, where it was more successful, it spanned several VHS releases by the likes of Video Gems and CEL Home Video respectively. These releases feature the full length UK theatrical version, which includes the songs "What Has Love Got to Do with Being Married" and "I Can't Forget the Melody" that were cut from the US release.

In 2000, independent distributor Castle Hill (who had acquired US distribution rights in the mid-1990s) licensed the film to Image Entertainment for a US VHS and DVD release in its full length UK theatrical version. Extras on the DVD version include a video interview with the Sherman Brothers, an audio commentary by director Bryan Forbes, and a promotional featurette. This release is long out of print and was highly sought after prior to 2013.

On 19 November 2013, the film was released on DVD and Blu-ray by Inception Media Group, under licence from Castle Hill successor Westchester Films. This release uses a new 4K restoration of the UK theatrical version performed by Pinewood and a PCM 2.0 mix of the 4-Track Stereo, a 5.1 DTS Master Audio remix, and the isolated score in DTS-MA 5.1. In addition to porting over all the extras and the audio commentary from the Image Entertainment DVD, the only new supplement is the UK theatrical trailer mastered from a 35mm element. The film has also received overseas Blu-Ray releases from Second Sight in the UK and Orustak Pictures in Japan, both utilizing the Pinewood 4K restoration and most extras from the Inception release.

On 5 February 2019, Shout Factory (who had purchased Westchester Films in 2017 and reincorporated their titles under the Shout Factory branding) reissued the film on DVD and Blu-Ray. This reissue is almost identical to the prior Inception Media Group release utilizing the same Pinewood restoration and supplements, only down to video encoding differences and the 2.0 stereo track being DTS Master Audio.
