= Kim O'Brien =

American actress

- Born: April 28, 1956
- Died: May 25, 2009 (aged 53); El Dorado, California, U.S.
- Occupation: Actress
- Years active: 1974–1987

Kim O'Brien was an American actress active from 1974 to 1987. She played a variety of roles in movies and television shows.

== Filmography ==
Title	Year	Role	Notes
Huckleberry Finn	1974	Mary Jane Wilks	(Film)
Gunsmoke	1974	Katherine	Episode: "Thirty a Month and Found"
The Waltons	1974	Eileen	Episode: "The First Day"
The Waltons	1975	Secretary Miss Forester	Episode: "The Genius"
Police Woman	1975	Elsa Myers	Episode: "Paradise Mall"
Police Woman	1976	Cindy	Episode: "The Lifeline Agency"
McCloud	1976	Nancy Houstachek / Nancy Houston	Episode: "Our Man in the Harem"
The Bob Newhart Show	1976	Kim	Episode: "The Slammer"
Happy Days	1977	Candy	Episode: "Time Capsule"
The Amazing Howard Hughes	1977		(TV movie)
Young Joe, the Forgotten Kennedy	1977	Melody Lane	(TV movie)
Winter Kills	1979	First Blonde Girl	(Film)
CHiPs	1979	Donna	Episode: "Valley Go Home!"
Fantasy Island	1979	Jennifer	Episode: "The Victim/The Mermaid"
The New Mike Hammer	1985	Loni Challenger	Episode: "Firestorm"
Highway to Heaven	1987	Sandra	Episode: "The Hero"
