= Sherman Brothers =

American songwriting duo

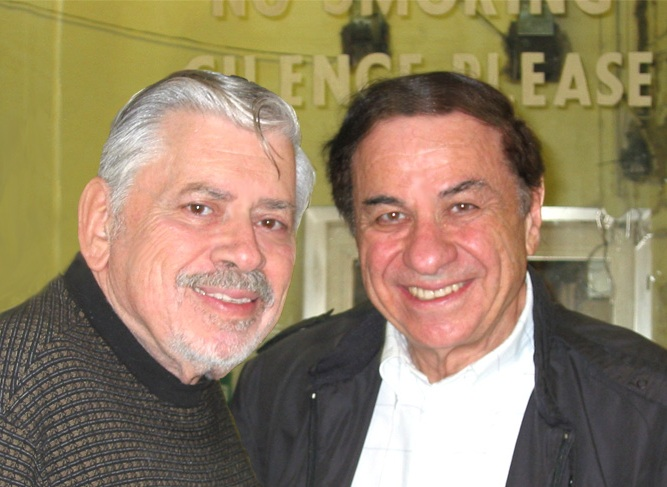
Robert Sherman and Richard Sherman at the London Palladium in 2002 during the premiere of Chitty Chitty Bang Bang: The Stage Musical

The Sherman Brothers were an American songwriting duo that specialized in musical films, made up of brothers Robert Sherman (December 19, 1925 – March 6, 2012) and Richard Sherman (June 12, 1928 – May 25, 2024). Together they received various accolades including two Academy Awards and three Grammy Awards. They received nominations for a Laurence Olivier Award, a BAFTA Award, and five Golden Globe Awards. In 1976, they received a star on the Hollywood Walk of Fame, and the National Medal of the Arts in 2008.

The Sherman Brothers wrote more motion-picture musical song scores than any other songwriting team in film history. Their work includes the live-action films The Parent Trap (1961), Mary Poppins (1964), Chitty Chitty Bang Bang (1968), and Bedknobs and Broomsticks (1971) and the animated films The Sword in the Stone (1963), The Jungle Book (1967, except "The Bare Necessities", which Terry Gilkyson wrote), Charlotte's Web (1973), The Aristocats (1970), and The Many Adventures of Winnie the Pooh (1977). Among their most famous works are the theme park songs "There's a Great Big Beautiful Tomorrow" and "It's a Small World (After All)". According to Time magazine, the latter song is the most performed song of all time.

The Shermans earned nine Academy Award nominations (with two wins), two Grammy Awards, four Grammy Award nominations, and 23 gold- and platinum-certified albums.

== Life and work ==
=== 1950s ===
Sons of Russian-Jewish immigrants, Robert and Richard Sherman began writing songs together in 1951 on a challenge from their father, Tin Pan Alley songwriter Al Sherman. The brothers wrote together and with different songwriting partners throughout the rest of the decade.

In 1958, Robert founded the music publishing company Music World Corporation, which later enjoyed a landmark relationship with Disney's BMI-affiliated publishing arm, Wonderland Music Company. That same year, the Sherman Brothers had their first top-ten hit with "Tall Paul", sung by Mouseketeer Judy Harriet on the Surf Records label and then covered by Mouseketeer Annette Funicello. They wrote the international hit "You're Sixteen," first recorded in 1960 by rockabilly singer Johnny Burnette, and a chart success again in 1973 for Ringo Starr. They also wrote the title song for Doris Day's album Bright and Shiny, recorded in 1960 and released a year later.

=== 1960s ===
The success of these songs gained the attention of Walt Disney, who eventually hired the Sherman Brothers as staff songwriters for Walt Disney Studios. The first song they wrote on personal assignment by Walt Disney was "Strummin' Song" in 1961. It was used in the Annette Funicello made-for-television movie called The Horsemasters. The first song that the Sherman Brothers contributed to a Disney movie was "Medfield Fight Song" from the film The Absent-Minded Professor (1961).

While at Disney, the Sherman Brothers wrote more motion-picture musical scores than any other songwriters in the history of film. They also wrote what is perhaps their best-known song, "It's a Small World (After All)", for the 1964 New York World's Fair. Since then, some have claimed that this has become the most translated and performed song on Earth, although this is largely due to the fact that it is played continuously at Disney's theme park "It's a Small World" attractions of the same name.

In 1965, the Sherman Brothers won two Academy Awards for Mary Poppins, which includes the songs "Feed The Birds," "Supercalifragilisticexpialidocious," and the Oscar-winning "Chim Chim Cher-ee." Starting with this movie, and continuing through several subsequent Disney movies, the Sherman Brothers collaborated with noted arranger-conductor Irwin Kostal.

Robert and Richard Sherman worked directly for Walt Disney, completing the scores for the live-action musical films The Happiest Millionaire and The One and Only, Genuine, Original Family Band until Disney's death in 1966.

Their first non-Disney assignment came with Albert R. Broccoli's motion picture production Chitty Chitty Bang Bang for United Artists in 1968, which garnered the brothers their third Academy Award nomination for Best Original Song for its particularly memorable titular song.

=== 1970s ===
In 1970, the Shermans returned to Disney for a brief stint where they completed work on The Aristocats and Bedknobs and Broomsticks. The latter film garnered the brothers their fourth and fifth Oscar nominations. 1972 saw the release of Snoopy Come Home, for which the brothers received a Grammy nomination.

In 1973, the Sherman Brothers also made history by becoming the only Americans ever to win First Prize at the Moscow Film Festival for Tom Sawyer, for which they also authored the screenplay.

In 1976, The Slipper and the Rose was picked to be the Royal Command Performance of the year. The performance was attended by Queen Elizabeth, the Queen Mother. A modern musical adaptation of the classic Cinderella story, Slipper also featured songs, score, and screenplay by the Sherman Brothers. Two further Academy Award nominations were garnered by the brothers for the film. That same year the Sherman Brothers received a star on the Hollywood Walk of Fame directly across from Grauman's Chinese Theatre.

The Sherman Brothers' numerous other Disney and non-Disney top box office film credits include The Jungle Book (1967), The Aristocats (1970), The Parent Trap (1961), The Parent Trap (1998), Charlotte's Web (1973), Huckleberry Finn (1974), The Many Adventures of Winnie the Pooh (1977), Snoopy Come Home (1972), Bedknobs and Broomsticks (1971), and Little Nemo: Adventures in Slumberland (1989). Outside the motion-picture realm, their Tony Award-nominated hit Over Here! (1974) was the biggest-grossing original Broadway musical of that year and broke box-office records for its Off-Broadway revival (2019).

=== 2000s ===
In 2000, the Sherman Brothers wrote the song score for the Disney film The Tigger Movie. This film marked the brothers' first major motion picture for the Disney company in over 28 years, and was also their final film credit as a duo.

In 2002, Chitty hit the London stage, receiving rave reviews. Chitty Chitty Bang Bang is currently the most successful stage show ever produced at the London Palladium, boasting the longest run in that century-old theater's history. On April 28, 2005, a second Chitty company premiered on Broadway (New York City) at the Foxwoods Theatre. The Sherman Brothers wrote an additional six songs specifically for the new stage productions.

In 2003, four Sherman Brothers' musicals ranked in the Top 10 Favorite Children's Films of All Time in a British nationwide poll reported by the BBC. Most notably, Chitty Chitty Bang Bang (1968) topped the list at #1. In later years, with Robert's move to London, the brothers wrote new songs for the stage musical presentation of Chitty Chitty Bang Bang. For their contributions to the motion picture industry, the Sherman brothers have a star on the Hollywood Walk of Fame at 6918 Hollywood Blvd. and were inducted into the Songwriters Hall of Fame on June 9, 2005. On November 16, 2006, Mary Poppins premiered at the New Amsterdam Theatre on Broadway.

On November 17, 2008, the Sherman Brothers received the National Medal of Arts, which is the highest honor conferred on artists or patrons of the arts by the United States Government. The award was presented by United States President George W. Bush in an East Room ceremony at The White House.

On May 22, 2009, The Boys: The Sherman Brothers' Story, a critically acclaimed documentary film about the pair, was theatrically released. The film was directed and produced by their sons, Gregory V. Sherman and Jeff Sherman, and distributed by Walt Disney Pictures. In October 2009, Disney released a 59-track, two-CD compendium of their work for the studio spanning 42 years. The CD is titled The Sherman Brothers Songbook. On March 11, 2010, the Sherman Brothers were presented with a specialized window on Main Street, U.S.A., at Disneyland in Anaheim, California, in honor of their contribution to Disney theme parks. On May 17, 2010, the Sherman Brothers received the "Career Achievement Award" at The Theatre Museum's 2010 Awards Gala in New York City.

From 2002, Robert Sherman lived in London, England. He moved from Beverly Hills, while Richard Sherman remained in California. Robert Sherman died in London on March 6, 2012. Richard Sherman died in Los Angeles on May 25, 2024.

== Influence and recognition ==
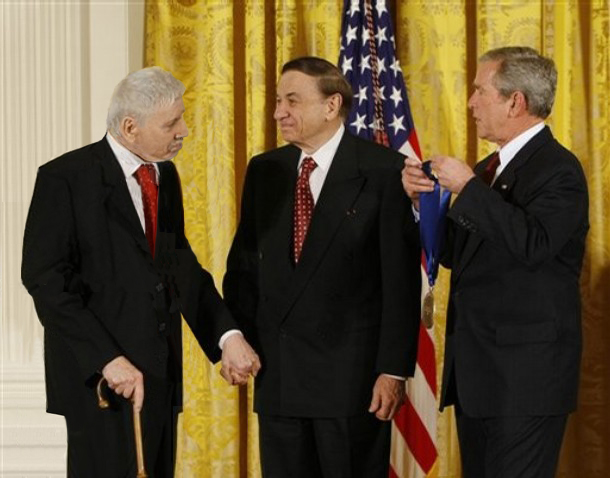
The Sherman Brothers receive the National Medal of Arts, the highest honor bestowed upon artists from the United States Government. Left to right: Robert B. Sherman, Richard M. Sherman and U.S. President George W. Bush at The White House, November 17, 2008.

- In 2000, the Sherman Brothers wrote the award-winning score to The Tigger Movie which achieved number-one status in both theatrical box office and video sales. They also composed a song for the movie called "Your Heart Will Lead You Home", co-written and performed by Kenny Loggins.
- The Sherman Brothers' motion picture Chitty Chitty Bang Bang was adapted into a London West End Musical in 2002 and premiered at the London Palladium on April 16, 2002, featuring many new songs and a reworked score by both Sherman Brothers. It was nominated for a 2003 Laurence Olivier Theatre Award for Best New Musical. The Sherman Brothers each received the Musical Theatre Award from the Variety Club of Great Britain that year as well for Chitty, which finished a record breaking three-and-a-half-year run at the Palladium, becoming the longest running show in the theater's century long history. In 2004, the premiere of Mary Poppins arrived on the stage. In 2005, Poppins was nominated for nine Olivier Awards. In 2005, Chitty went to Broadway and was nominated for nine Tonys and also began its nationwide (UK) tour.
- On June 9, 2005, both Shermans were inducted into the Songwriters Hall of Fame alongside Bill Withers, Steve Cropper, John Fogerty, Isaac Hayes, and David Porter.
- On November 16, 2006, the Cameron Mackintosh/Disney production of Mary Poppins made its Broadway premiere at the New Amsterdam Theater featuring the Sherman Brothers' classic songs.
- In 2007, during the 40th-anniversary DVD rerelease of The Jungle Book London press junket, the Sherman Brothers were witnessed by press working on a new song for Inkas (see below) in the same Brown's Hotel room where The Jungle Book was originally penned by British writer Rudyard Kipling over a hundred years earlier.
- In February 2008, Chitty Chitty Bang Bang began a second UK tour. In 2008 and 2009, Poppins premiered in numerous cities throughout the world including Stockholm, Copenhagen, Budapest, Toronto, Shanghai, Sydney, Johannesburg, Amsterdam, Buenos Aires, São Paulo, and Helsinki. Full UK and US tours of Poppins also commenced in 2008, 2009 and 2010 respectively.
- On May 21, 2011, the Sherman Brothers were each awarded honorary doctorate degrees in Fine Arts from their alma mater, Bard College. This was Robert's second honorary doctorate. His first was granted by Lincoln College on May 12, 1990. Robert's critically acclaimed autobiography, Moose: Chapters From My Life was published posthumously by AuthorHouse Publishers on November 27, 2013, in anticipation of the release of the Walt Disney Pictures film Saving Mr. Banks. Set in 1961 and based on the stories behind the original development meetings for Disney's film version of Mary Poppins, Saving Mr. Banks features actors B. J. Novak as Robert Sherman and Jason Schwartzman as Richard Sherman.
- In 2014, the Sherman Brothers, alongside their father Al Sherman, were the subjects of a London musical concert titled A Spoonful of Sherman written, produced, and hosted by Robert's son, Robert J. Sherman. The concert received generally very positive reviews including four stars from The Times. A CD produced by Nick Lloyd Webber was released by SimG Records in 2015.
- In 2017 A Spoonful of Sherman was revived, playing at the venue, "Live At Zédel" in London.
- On July 31, 2018, the Walt Disney Studios in Burbank, California renamed Soundstage A the Sherman Brothers Stage.
- In 2018, the first A Spoonful of Sherman UK/Ireland Tour began with previews on February 14, 2018, at the EM Forester Theatre in Tonbridge, Kent. The tour played in 28 cities in England, Scotland, Wales and the Republic of Ireland. Cast members for the tour included Sophie-Louise Dann, Mark Read, Glen Facey, Jenna Innes and Ben Stock.

== Filmography ==
=== Film ===
- The Absent-Minded Professor, 1961 – "Medfield Fight Song" only
- The Parent Trap, 1961
- A Symposium on Popular Songs, 1962 – animated short
- Moon Pilot, 1962
- Bon Voyage!, 1962
- Big Red, 1962
- The Legend of Lobo, 1962
- In Search of the Castaways, 1962
- Miracle of the White Stallions, 1963
- Summer Magic, 1963
- The Sword in the Stone, 1963
- The Misadventures of Merlin Jones, 1964
- Mary Poppins, 1964
- Those Calloways, 1965
- The Monkey's Uncle, 1965
- That Darn Cat!, 1965
- Winnie the Pooh and the Honey Tree, 1966 – animated short
- Follow Me, Boys!, 1966
- Monkeys, Go Home!, 1967
- The Adventures of Bullwhip Griffin, 1967
- The Gnome-Mobile, 1967
- The Jungle Book, 1967 (all songs except "The Bare Necessities")
- The Happiest Millionaire, 1967
- The One and Only, Genuine, Original Family Band, 1968
- Chitty Chitty Bang Bang, 1968
- Winnie the Pooh and the Blustery Day, 1968 – animated short
- The Aristocats, 1970 (all songs except "Thomas O'Malley Cat"
- Bedknobs and Broomsticks, 1971
- Snoopy Come Home, 1972
- Charlotte's Web, 1973
- Tom Sawyer, 1973
- Huckleberry Finn, 1974
- Winnie the Pooh and Tigger Too, 1974 – animated short
- The Slipper and the Rose, 1976
- The Many Adventures of Winnie the Pooh, 1977
- The Magic of Lassie, 1978
- Magic Journeys, 1982 - theme park attraction
- Welcome to Pooh Corner, 1983 – television series
- Winnie the Pooh and a Day for Eeyore, 1983 - animated short
- Little Nemo: Adventures in Slumberland, 1992
- The Mighty Kong, 1998
- The Parent Trap, 1998
- Seasons of Giving, 1999 – direct-to-video film
- The Tigger Movie, 2000
- The Jungle Book 2, 2003 – music references from the original 1967 film
- Winnie the Pooh, 2011 – theme song and "The Wonderful Thing About Tiggers" rendition only
- Saving Mr. Banks, 2013 – songs from the original 1964 Mary Poppins film
- Tomorrowland, 2015 – music references
- The Jungle Book, 2016
- Christopher Robin, 2018
- Mary Poppins Returns, 2018 – music references from the original 1964 film
- Inkas the Ramferinkas, 2023 – (announced).

=== Television ===
Episodes from the Walt Disney anthology television series

- Auld Acquaintance (Zorro special)
- The Ballad of Hector the Stowaway Dog
- The Big Swindle
- A Boy Called Nuthin'
- Bristle Face
- Carnival Time
- A Case of Murder
- The Daily Press vs. City Hall
- Escapade in Florence
- Gallegher
- Greta, the Misfit Greyhound
- Holiday Time at Disneyland
- The Horse Without a Head
- The Horsemasters
- Johnny Shiloh
- Mediterranean Cruise
- Mooncussers
- The Postponed Wedding
- A Rag, A Bone, A Box of Junk
- Spy in the Sky
- The Tenderfoot
- The Young Loner

Film Screenplays

- A Symposium on Popular Songs, 1962 (uncredited)
- Mary Poppins, 1964 (treatment only)
- Tom Sawyer, 1973 (screenplay)
- Huckleberry Finn, 1974 (screenplay)
- The Slipper and the Rose, 1976 (screenplay)
- The Magic of Lassie, 1978 (screenplay) / (story)
- Ferdinand the Bull, 1986 (*TV screenplay)

=== Theatre ===
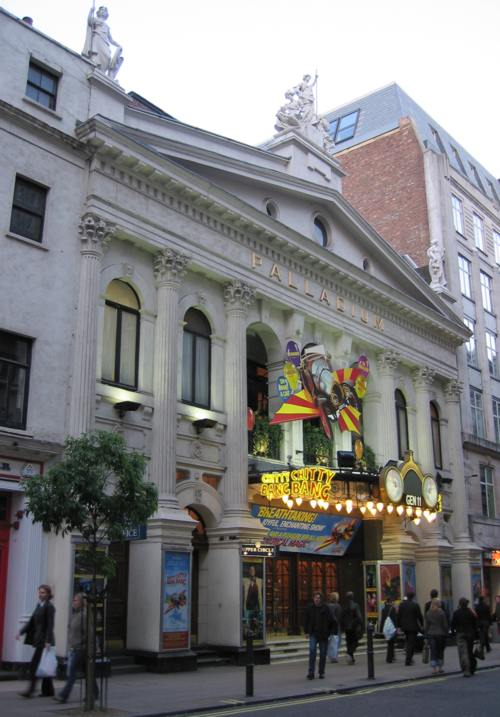
The London Palladium in 2004

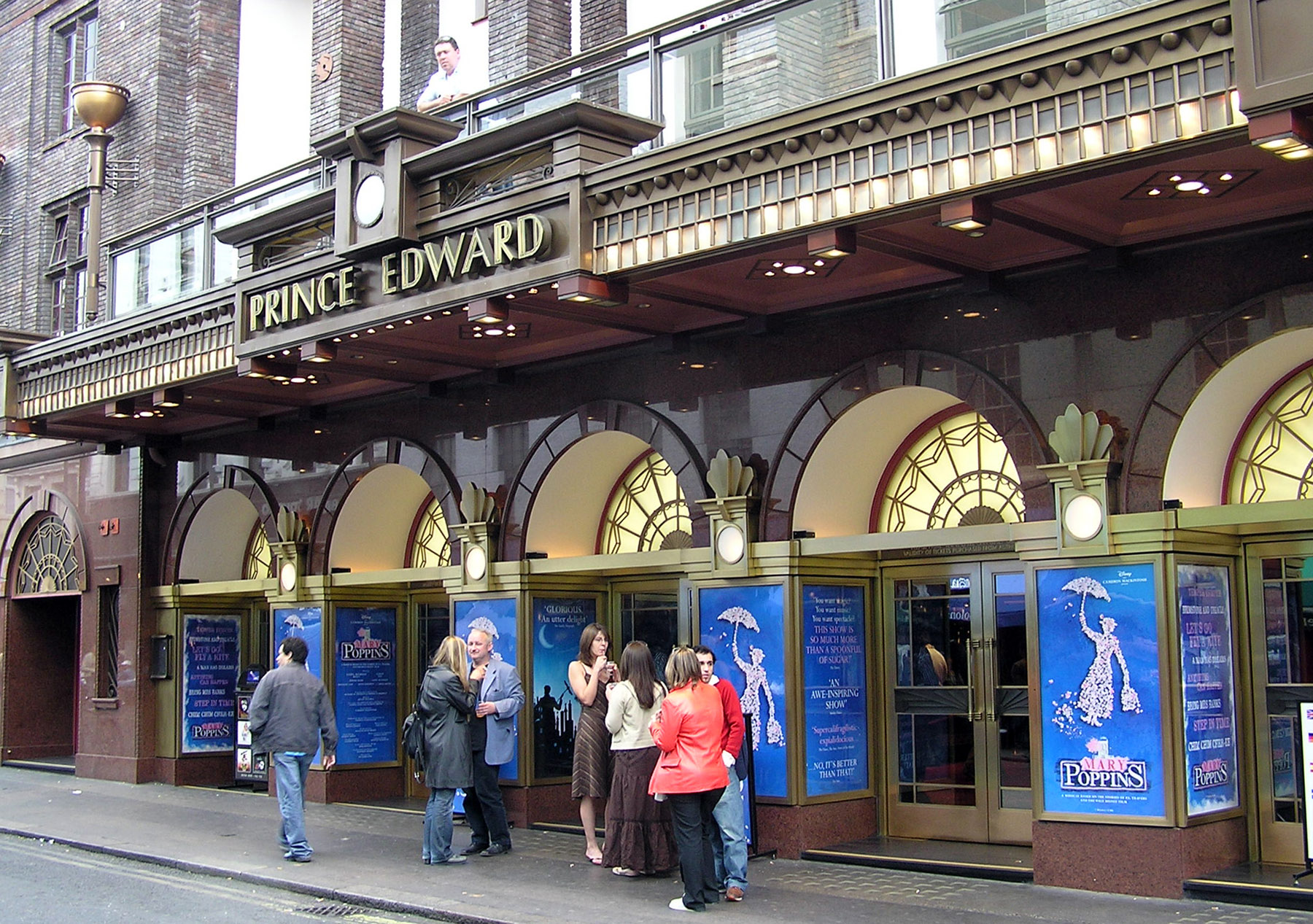
Prince Edward Theatre in 2005

- Victory Canteen, 1971 (Ivar Theatre, L.A.)
- Over Here!, 1974 (Broadway, NY)
- Dawgs, 1983 (Variety Arts Center, L.A.)
- Busker Alley, 1995 (U.S. Tour)
- Chitty Chitty Bang Bang, 2002 (London)
- Mary Poppins, 2004 (London)
- On the Record 2004-5 (U.S. Tour) (several songs included)
- Chitty Chitty Bang Bang, 2005 (Broadway, NY)
- Chitty Chitty Bang Bang, 2005 (UK Tour)
- Busker Alley, 2006 (Broadway, NY – *one night only)
- Mary Poppins, 2006 (Broadway, NY)
- Chitty Chitty Bang Bang, 2007 (Singapore)
- Mary Poppins, 2008 (UK Tour)
- Chitty Chitty Bang Bang, 2008 (Second UK Tour)
- Mary Poppins, 2008 (Gothenburg)
- Mary Poppins, 2009 (First US Tour)
- Mary Poppins, 2009 (Copenhagen)
- Mary Poppins, 2009 (Budapest)
- Mary Poppins, 2009 (Shanghai)
- Mary Poppins, 2009 (Australia)
- Mary Poppins, 2009 (South Africa)
- Mary Poppins, 2009 (Scheveningen)
- Mary Poppins, 2009 (Helsinki)
- Mary Poppins, 2012–13 (Second US Tour)
- A Spoonful of Sherman, 2014 (London)
- A Spoonful of Sherman, 2017 (London)
- A Spoonful of Sherman, 2018 (UK/Ireland Tour)
- A Spoonful of Sherman, 2019 (Singapore)
- Over Here!, 2019 (Off-Broadway, NY – *one night only)
- Mary Poppins, 2019– (London Revival)
- Winnie the Pooh: The New Musical Adaptation 2021 (New York City)
- Bedknobs And Broomsticks, 2021– (UK tour)

=== Theme park songs ===
- Adventure Thru Inner Space
  - "Miracles from Molecules"
- America on Parade
  - "The Glorious Fourth"
- CommuniCore
  - "The Astuter Computer Revue" (for the 1982 premiere of the pavilion at EPCOT Center)
- Epcot Center Opening & Dedication
  - "The World Showcase March"
- Pepsi Presents Walt Disney's "It's a Small World" – a Salute to UNICEF and the World's Children for the 1964 New York World's Fair
  - "It's a Small World (After All)" was then adapted for each Disney park's "It's a Small World" attraction installation.
- Innoventions
  - "There's a Bright New World of Innoventions"
- Journey Into Imagination (and Journey Into Imagination With Figment)
  - "One Little Spark"
- Magic Journeys
  - "Magic Journeys"
  - "Makin' Memories"
- Meet the World in Tokyo Disneyland
  - "Meet the World"
  - "We Meet the World with Love"
- Rocket Rods
  - "Magic Highways"
- Walt Disney's Carousel of Progress
  - "The Best Time of Your Life"
  - "There's a Great Big Beautiful Tomorrow"
- Walt Disney's Enchanted Tiki Room
  - "The Tiki, Tiki, Tiki Room"
- Disneyland Forever
  - "Live the Magic"
  - "A Kiss Goodnight"

Other

- Three songs plus underscore for the NBC-TV animated musical Goldilocks produced in 1969 by DePatie-Freleng (of Pink Panther fame) starring Bing Crosby, his wife Kathryn Grant and two youngest children Mary Frances and Nathaniel.
- "The Spectrum Song" – for Walt Disney's The Wonderful World of Color. Sung by Paul Frees as Ludwig Von Drake.
- Three unfinished film scores for a musical adaptation of James Thurber's novel The 13 Clocks, another of Roman Holiday, and one for Jack Kinney titled Sir Puss in Boots.
- Richard Sherman wrote the "theme park" song "Make Way For Tomorrow Today" for the movie Iron Man 2.

== Awards and nominations ==
=== Academy Awards ===
- 1964 Won Academy Award in the category of "Best Original Song" for "Chim Chim Cher-ee" from Mary Poppins
- 1964 Won Academy Award in the category of "Best Substantially Original Score" for Mary Poppins
- 1968 Nominated Academy Award in the category of "Best Original Song" for "Chitty Chitty Bang Bang" from Chitty Chitty Bang Bang
- 1971 Nominated Academy Award in the category of "Best Original Song" for "The Age of Not Believing" from Bedknobs & Broomsticks
- 1971 Nominated Academy Award in the category of "Best Scoring Adaptation and Original Song Score" for Bedknobs & Broomsticks
- 1973 Nominated Academy Award in the category of "Best Scoring Original Song Score And/Or Adaptation" for Tom Sawyer
- 1977 Nominated Academy Award in the category of "Best Original Song" for "The Slipper and the Rose Waltz" from The Slipper and the Rose
- 1977 Nominated Academy Award in the category of "Best Scoring Original Song Score And/Or Adaptation" for The Slipper and the Rose
- 1978 Nominated Academy Award in the category of "Best Original Song" for "When You're Loved" from The Magic of Lassie

=== Annie Awards ===
- 2000 Nominated Annie in the category of "Outstanding Individual Achievement for Music in an Animated Feature Production" for the song "Round My Family Tree" from The Tigger Movie
- 2003 "Winsor McCay Award" for lifetime achievement and contribution to animation

=== BAFTA Awards ===
- 1977 Nominated "Anthony Asquith Award for Film Music" for The Slipper and the Rose

=== BMI ===
- 1977 "Pioneer Award" awarded in Los Angeles, California.
- 1991 "Lifetime Achievement Award" awarded at the Beverly Wilshire Hotel in Los Angeles, California.

=== Christopher Award ===
- 1964 "Christopher Award" for "Best Original Song Score" for Mary Poppins
- 1973 "Christopher Award" for "Best Original Song Score" for Tom Sawyer

=== Disney ===
- 1985 "Mousecar" awarded at the Hollywood Bowl in Hollywood, California in front of 20 thousand people.
- 1990 "Disney Legends" awarded at the Walt Disney Studios in Burbank, California.
- 2010 Main Street, U.S. Window presented at Disneyland in Anaheim, California in honor of the Sherman Brothers' contribution to Disney theme parks.

=== Golden Globes ===
- 1965 Nominated Golden Globe in the category of "Best Original Score" for Mary Poppins
- 1969 Nominated Golden Globe in the category of "Best Original Score" for Chitty Chitty Bang Bang
- 1969 Nominated Golden Globe in the category of "Best Original Song" for Chitty Chitty Bang Bang
- 1974 Nominated Golden Globe in the category of "Best Original Score" for Tom Sawyer
- 1977 Nominated Golden Globe in the category of "Best Original Score" for The Slipper and the Rose

=== Golden Videocassette Award ===
- 1984 Best Selling Video Cassette (of all time) for Mary Poppins

=== Grammy Awards ===
- 1965 Won Grammy in the category of "Best Original Score for a Motion Picture or Television Show" for Mary Poppins
- 1965 Won Grammy in the category of "Best Recording for Children" for Mary Poppins
- 1966 Nominated Grammy in the category of "Best Recording for Children" for Winnie the Pooh and the Honey Tree
- 1968 Nominated Grammy in the category of "Best Recording for Children" for The Jungle Book
- 1970 Nominated Grammy in the category of "Best Recording for Children" for Chitty Chitty Bang Bang
- 1971 Nominated Grammy in the category of "Best Recording for Children" for The Aristocats
- 1973 Nominated Grammy in the category of "Best Original Score for a Children's Show" for Snoopy Come Home
- 1974 Nominated Grammy in the category of "Best Original Score for a Musical Show" for Over Here!
- 1975 Won Grammy in the category of "Best Recording for Children" for Winnie the Pooh and Tigger Too

=== Laurel Awards ===
- 1965 Won "Golden Laurel" in the category of "Best Song" "Chim Chim Cher-ee" for Mary Poppins
- 1965 2nd Place "Golden Laurel" in the category of "Music Men"
- 1966 3rd place "Golden Laurel" in the category of "Best Song" "That Darn Cat!" for That Darn Cat!

=== Moscow Film Festival ===
- 1973 First Place Award in the category of "Best Music" for Tom Sawyer

=== National Medal of Arts ===
- 2008 National Medal of Arts awarded to Richard and Robert Sherman on November 17, 2008, at the White House by President George W. Bush. This is the highest honor the United States Government bestows on artists.

=== Olivier Awards ===
- 2002 Nominated "Best Musical" for Chitty Chitty Bang Bang.

=== Songwriters Hall of Fame ===
- 2005 induction at the Marriott Hotel on Times Square in New York City.

=== Theatre Museum Award ===
- 2010 Career Achievement Award presented on May 17, 2010, at The Players Club in New York City.

=== Variety Club Awards ===
- 2003 Won "Best Musical" for Chitty Chitty Bang Bang.

=== Walk of Fame ===
- 1976 A Star on the Hollywood Walk of Fame awarded to "Richard & Robert Sherman" on November 17, 1976, located at 6914 Hollywood Blvd.
