= Huckleberry Finn (1974 film) =

1974 film by J. Lee Thompson

- Theatrical release poster
- Directed by: J. Lee Thompson
- Written by: Robert B. Sherman; Richard M. Sherman
- Produced by: Arthur P. Jacobs
- Starring: Jeff East; Paul Winfield; Harvey Korman; David Wayne; Arthur O'Connell; Gary Merrill; Natalie Trundy
- Cinematography: László Kovács
- Edited by: Michael F. Anderson
- Music by: Songs: Richard M. Sherman; Robert B. Sherman; Score: Fred Werner
- Production companies: APJAC Productions; Reader's Digest
- Distributed by: United Artists
- Release date: May 24, 1974
- Running time: 118 minutes
- Country: United States
- Language: English

Huckleberry Finn is a 1974 musical film version of Mark Twain's 1884 novel The Adventures of Huckleberry Finn.

The movie was produced by Reader's Digest and Arthur P. Jacobs (known for his role in the production of the Planet of the Apes films) and directed by J. Lee Thompson. It stars Jeff East as Huckleberry Finn and Paul Winfield as Jim. The film contains original music and songs, such as "Freedom" and "Cairo, Illinois", by the Sherman Brothers: Richard M. Sherman and Robert B. Sherman.

This film followed the previous year's highly successful Tom Sawyer, based on Twain's 1876 novel The Adventures of Tom Sawyer, also produced and written by the same team and starring East in the role of Huckleberry Finn.

== Synopsis ==
Huckleberry Finn is a boy from Missouri living with a kindly widow and her sister who has taken him in. One day his father, previously thought dead, shows up because he heard of treasure Huck had found. Huck's father essentially kidnaps the boy, wanting $1,000 for his safe return. Staging his own death, Huck escapes and meets up with the kindly slave Jim. Together they travel downriver, in search of Jim's freedom.

== Cast ==
- Jeff East as Huckleberry Finn
- Paul Winfield as Jim
- Harvey Korman as The King
- David Wayne as The Duke
- Arthur O'Connell as Col. Grangerford
- Gary Merrill as Pap
- Natalie Trundy as Mrs. Loftus
- Lucille Benson as Widow Douglas
- Kim O'Brien as Maryjane Wilks
- Jean Fay as Susan Wilks
- Ruby Leftwich as Miss Watson
- Odessa Cleveland as Jim's wife

== Production ==
The film was a sequel to Tom Sawyer, which was financed from United Artists and Reader's Digest. Even before that film had been released, producer Arthur Jacobs arranged for finance for a sequel based on Huckleberry Finn. The director was J. Lee Thompson, with whom Jacobs had worked several times, most recently on two Planet of the Apes films.

Paul Winfield said he would only agree to the movie if the producer and director would guarantee there would be no "singing slaves". "Gone with the Wind was one of the traumas of my life," said Winfield.

Like Tom Sawyer, the film was shot in Arrow Rock and Lupus, Missouri. It was also shot in Natchez, Mississippi. Filming started 18 June 1973.

Filming had only just began when Arthur Jacobs died of a heart attack in Los Angeles. Robert Blumofe was assigned to take over time. Filming resumed after the break of one day. Natalie Trundy, Jacobs' wife, had a role in the film and had to fly back to Los Angeles then return to location.

Paul Winfield was arrested for possession of marijuana in his hotel room. (He claimed he had been sent it in the mail and was framed.) Thompson said the treatment of Winfield by the local police was "abominable" and that "I would never encourage a company to come to Natchez again." This comment upset the Natchez media who wrote articles critical of Thompson. Thompson retracted his comments about the town but maintained the police had shown prejudice towards Winfield.

Director J. Lee Thompson had problems with the synchronized musical direction. Another problem was the unfortunate timing of writer Robert B. Sherman's knee operation.

Roberta Flack sang "Freedom" but insisted on having a guitar backing to her recording. She later threatened to sue if the original cast album was released with a dominant orchestral backing. Although the album was recorded and printed, it was never released.

Despite these setbacks, the film still achieved some success and some of the film's songs, including "Freedom", are still considered classics.

== Songs ==
The songs and score were written by the Sherman Brothers.

1. "Freedom". Sung by Roberta Flack (who did not approve of the musical arrangement and threatened a lawsuit if the original cast album were not remixed to her liking)
2. "Someday, Honey Darlin'". Sung by Paul Winfield
3. "Rotten Luck". Sung by Gary Merrill (the entire song was filmed sans-sync except for the final line of the song in which we see Merrill look back at the cabin and say, "And now my luck... It ain't so bad!")
4. "Cairo, Illinois". Sung by Jeff East and Paul Winfield
5. "A Rose In A Bible"
6. "Royalty!". Sung by Harvey Korman and David Wayne
7. "The Royal Nonesuch". Sung by Harvey Korman
8. "What's Right, What's Wrong?" Sung by Jeff East
9. "Into His Hands". Sung by Harvey Korman

== Reception ==
The Los Angeles Times called it "hardly unpleasant but it is surprisingly dull." The New York Times called it "a lavish bore".

== See also ==
- List of films featuring slavery
