= Ludwig Von Drake =

Fictional Disney cartoon character

- Donald Duck / Mickey Mouse character
- First appearance: The Wonderful World of Color (1961)
- Created by: Walt Disney; Bill Berg; Milt Kahl
- Voiced by: Paul Frees (1961–1986); Wayne Allwine (1985, Ludwig's Think Tank); Tony Pope (1986, Disney Discovery Series); Walker Edmiston (1986, Walt Disney World's 15th Anniversary Celebration); Albert Ash (1987, DTV Doggone Valentine and Down and Out with Donald Duck); Corey Burton (1987–present)

In-universe information
- Aliases: Otto van Drakenstein (Dutch), Primus von Quack (German), Ludovico von Pato (Portuguese)
- Species: American Pekin Duck
- Gender: Male
- Occupation: Scientist
- Children: Anya, Corvus and Klara Von Drake (DuckTales 2017 series only)
- Relatives: Donald Duck (nephew); Della Duck (niece); Huey, Dewey and Louie (grand-nephews); Mother Goose (grandmother); Wolfgang Von Drake (uncle); Victor Von Goose (cousin)
- Nationality: Austrian

Professor Ludwig Von Drake is a cartoon character created in 1961 by The Walt Disney Company. He is the paternal uncle of Donald Duck. He was first introduced as the presenter (and singer of "The Spectrum Song") in the cartoon An Adventure in Color, part of the first episode of Walt Disney's Wonderful World of Color on NBC. According to the episode The Hunting Instinct of that series he and Donald Duck's father are brothers. He is described as a scientist, lecturer, psychologist, and world traveler. The character displayed his "expert" knowledge on a variety of subjects in eighteen episodes of the classic anthology series, as well as on a number of Disneyland Records.

Paul Frees was the original voice of Ludwig Von Drake. After Frees retired from the role, the character was briefly voiced by Wayne Allwine and Walker Edmiston. Since 1987, he has been voiced by Corey Burton. Ludwig Von Drake has also appeared in numerous Disney comics stories.

== Character ==
Ludwig Von Drake comes from Vienna, Austria, and has a fascination with knowledge. Since his youth, he has been trying to obtain as many diplomas, in any science, as possible. When he is consulted by other family members, it is a running gag that he almost invariably turns out to have a university degree relevant for whatever information they are seeking. He is often shown as having little social competence, however, and is often portrayed as being very forgetful, sometimes even somewhat senile. Much of this was the result of ad-libbing from his original voice actor, Paul Frees.

In the comics, Ludwig usually visits with Donald Duck and Donald's nephews Huey, Dewey, and Louie. On occasion, Daisy Duck will coax (or even trick) the professor into giving lectures and tours for her ladies' club. Ludwig can play the piano and acoustic guitar, as shown in a few television specials and more.

In the Wonderful World of Color episode The Hunting Instinct, Walt Disney states Ludwig is Donald Duck's father's brother. According to Walt Disney, Donald decided to adopt his maternal surname, Duck, when he got into show business, and that is the reason why he is not popularly known as Donald Von Drake. In the comic strips by Bob Karp and Al Taliaferro, Donald and his nephews usually call Ludwig 'Uncle Ludwig', and Daisy Duck refers to him as 'sort of an uncle' of Donald's in the first Sunday strip where his name is mentioned.

In the Wonderful World of Color episode Kids is Kids, Ludwig says, "Of course, I don't need any help raising children. I'm a bachelor." Besides, he has been shown to be a member of the Absentminded Dating Club, where he is the suitor of a duck woman called Alice. This is contradicted by Don Rosa's private (and unpublished) Duck Family tree which shows Ludwig married to Donald Duck's mother's sister Matilda McDuck. The same family tree also states this is the only relationship between Ludwig and Donald Duck; thereby contradicting Walt Disney's statement.

In the story "Duckburg, U.S.A.", published in Ludwig Von Drake #1 (November 1961), Professor Ludwig Von Drake arrives in Duckburg by train, and it is shown that Donald Duck had never seen this Austrian relative before, not even in a picture. Grandma Duck, Uncle Scrooge McDuck, Daisy Duck, Gladstone Gander, Huey, Dewey and Louie, Gus Goose, and Gyro Gearloose also appear in this same story waiting to know Ludwig at the train station, and Grandma enthusiastically exclaims, "Professor Ludwig Von Drake! Such a nice-sounding name!". In some old comic stories where Ludwig visits Grandma on her farm, it is clear that they have a close relationship, as shown in the story "Message From Space", where Grandma exclaims, "You need rest, dear boy!", after thinking he had a kind of nervous breakdown. In "Pigeon Panic" Ludwig exclaims, "Ho! You know you can depend on me!", after Grandma warned him to be careful with her smartest homer. There is an enlightening sequence of two panels in the story "The Rural Eggs-pert", where Ludwig is resting in an old chair of Grandma's house when an antique buyer asks Grandma to sell him "this fine old specimen" (the chair) and she answers, "Well, it's been in the family for years, but I could do without it!", making Ludwig astonished, since he thinks she is referring to him as if he was a livestock. He would not have reacted this way if he was not her relative. In the last panel of the story "Barn Dance Doctor", Grandma refers to Ludwig as her "cityfied cousin".

In the story "The Family Tree Spree", Donald scares of seeing Ludwig's specs on the floor and thinks about them as "Uncle Ludwig's specs". In the end of this same story, it is revealed that Ludwig also appears in Donald's paternal family tree, wherein he and Donald both have an ancestor called Colombust Duck. According to Carl Barks, Donald's father's surname is Duck, his mother's one being McDuck. Since Humperdink Duck (a.k.a. Grandpa Duck), Grandma Duck's deceased husband and Donald's paternal grandfather, was probably almost contemporary with Ludwig Von Drake, it is possible to consider they were half-brothers, Donald being thus Ludwig's grandnephew. Ludwig reveals to Daisy and her friends in "Blown Up Genius" that he came from a long line of glass blowers. In "Winning Ways", Daisy and her friends try to prepare Ludwig's favorite dish, called Wiener Schnitzel a la Weltschmerz, whose recipe belonged to Ludwig's great grandmother. Ludwig is really excited about it because he has not eaten that dish since he left Austria and came to Duckburg to know his relatives of Donald's paternal family. In "The Big Payoff", it is revealed that he spent many months living in Donald's house since his arrival in Duckburg. Ludwig wins a TV chess challenge in this comic story, making Donald exclaim, "Yippee! He did it! Now he can pay all he's owed us (he and his nephews) for these many months!". According to the story "The Jewels of Skull Rock", Ludwig spent six months in Donald's house. In the Christmas story "The Cuckoo Clock Caper", Ludwig exclaims that he and Scrooge are "joined in good fellowship". Ludwig and Gyro Gearloose competed as to who is the greater inventor in the comic story "I.Q. Bugaboo".

Those twelve stories mentioned above were drawn by Tony Strobl, who was the cartoonist responsible for introducing Professor Ludwig into American Disney comic books. Actually, Ludwig's first comic book appearance was in a not previously mentioned story by Strobl, "The Scene Stealer", first published in October 1961. The events shown in this one presumably happened after the ones shown in "Duckburg, U.S.A.", which was published two months later.

The character is partly based off of aerospace engineer Wernher von Braun.

== Filmography ==
Professor Ludwig Von Drake was introduced as a new character alongside Walt Disney himself in the very first episode of Walt Disney's Wonderful World of Color after the series was moved to NBC in the fall of 1961. He was designed by Bill Berg. Von Drake was frequently animated by Milt Kahl and Ward Kimball, two of Disney's Nine Old Men animators. Some animation of the character was also done by Frank Thomas and Eric Larson.

=== Television ===
Wonderful World of Color appearances (1960s)

- An Adventure in Color/Mathmagicland (24 September 1961) – This show introduced Walt Disney's new character and co-host Ludwig Von Drake, who lectures on the subject of color.
- The Hunting Instinct (22 October 1961) – Von Drake sheds some light on the subject of why man hunts with his assistant Herman the Bootle Beetle.
- Inside Donald Duck (5 November 1961) – Von Drake attempts to diagnose Donald Duck's problems, deciding the cause is romance.
- Kids Is Kids (10 December 1961) – Von Drake shares his knowledge on the subject of child psychology and how to handle Huey, Dewey, and Louie.
- Carnival Time (4 March 1962) – Von Drake takes a look at some major carnivals in New Orleans and Rio de Janeiro with Donald Duck and Jose Carioca.
- Von Drake in Spain (8 April 1962) – Von Drake lectures on the dances of Spain.
- Man Is His Own Worst Enemy (21 October 1962) – Von Drake explains why people are the biggest challenge facing humanity. This episode is sometimes titled Ducking Disaster with Donald and his Friends.
- Three Tall Tales (6 January 1963) – Von Drake and his sidekick Herman tell three stories including "Casey at the Bat", "The Saga of Windwagon Smith" and "Paul Bunyan."
- Inside Outer Space (10 February 1963) – Von Drake gives a lecture on outer space, using footage from Man in Space, Man and the Moon and Mars and Beyond.
- A Square Peg in a Round Hole (3 March 1963) – Von Drake has founded the Research Institute For Human Behavior.
- Fly with Von Drake (13 October 1963) – Von Drake gives a historically accurate and funny lecture on the birth of crewed flight.
- The Truth About Mother Goose (17 November 1963) – Von Drake tells the stories behind Mother Goose rhymes. Including footage from Mickey and the Beanstalk. Von Drake narrates this story which was originally featured as a segment in the 1947 feature film Fun and Fancy Free, replacing the original narration. Herman makes a comeback in this episode.
- Mediterranean Cruise (19 January 1964) – Von Drake takes a trip on a Cruise liner.
- In Shape with Von Drake (22 March 1964) – Von Drake returns to explain sports and fitness. He illustrates his points through the use of several Goofy cartoons.
- A Rag, a Bone, a Box of Junk (11 October 1964) – Von Drake makes a cameo in this documentary about stop-motion animation.
- Music for Everybody (30 January 1966) – Von Drake hosts this look at the importance of music in people's lives.
- Nature's Strangest Oddballs (29 March 1970) – Von Drake hosts this look at various animal species that have stayed

=== Theatrical ===
- A Symposium on Popular Songs (19 December 1962) – Von Drake demonstrates examples of popular music through the years.

=== Cartoon appearances (1980s–present) ===
Von Drake has appeared on several Disney animated cartoon series: DuckTales, Raw Toonage, Bonkers, Mickey Mouse Works, Quack Pack, House of Mouse, Mickey Mouse Clubhouse, Minnie's Bow-Toons, Mickey Mouse, Mickey Mouse Mixed-Up Adventures, the 2017 reboot of DuckTales, The Wonderful World of Mickey Mouse, Mickey Mouse Funhouse, Mickey Mouse Clubhouse+ and in numerous television specials. In all of these, Von Drake wears a pink shirt, black tie, red vest, and a lab coat.

In House of Mouse, Von Drake appears as a recurring character. In "Ask Von Drake", Mickey tries to prove that Von Drake does not know everything. At the end, Mickey convinces him that during the headcount of all the Disney characters, he forgot himself. Also, in "House of Genius", Von Drake creates robot duplicates of Mickey, Minnie, Donald, Daisy, Goofy, and Pluto. At the end, when Von Drake brings in a robot duplicate of himself, Mickey tells the robot to send the real Von Drake packing.

In Mickey Mouse Clubhouse, he is a major recurring character, often helping the protagonists, or asking for help himself.

Von Drake appears as a recurring character in the DuckTales reboot as the head of spy agency S.H.U.S.H.

Von Drake makes a cameo appearance between Walt Disney Animation Studios characters that take a group photo in the 2023 short film, Once Upon a Studio.

=== Sing-Along Songs series ===
In the Disney's Sing-Along Songs series of videos, he has hosted/co-hosted these five volumes:

- You Can Fly! (May 31, 1988)
- Fun with Music (along with Professor Owl) (May 9, 1989)
- Under the Sea (August 14, 1990)
- I Love to Laugh (February 22, 1991)
- Colors of the Wind (July 21, 1995)

== Disneyland Records discography ==
In 1961 Disneyland Records released the LP Professor Ludwig Von Drake. The LP had two songs from the character's debut in the An Adventure in Color episode ("The Green with Envy Blues" and "The Spectrum Song"), as well as new songs and comedy bits.

The track list for the "Ludwig Von Drake" LP:

1. I'm Ludwig Von Drake
2. The Spectrum Song
3. The Green with Envy Blues
4. It Gets You
5. Von Drake Variations on "The Blue Danube"
6. Professor Ludwig Von Drake Discourse: All About Sound Recording
7. An Operatic Version of a Theme from 'Cinderella'

As of February 2010, the digitally remastered LP can be downloaded exclusively at the iTunes Store.

== Print appearances ==
The Disney studio encouraged the writers of Duck comics to introduce this new character in print, and already in September 1961, Von Drake started appearing in Al Taliaferro and Bob Karp's featured daily strips. However, aside from a solitary cameo appearance in a one-page story in Uncle Scrooge #54 (December 1964), the character was not used by leading Disney duck artist Carl Barks.

In 1961, Dell Comics launched a comic book series starring Von Drake and illustrated by Tony Strobl, but it only lasted for four issues before being discontinued. The character made subsequent appearances in other comic titles such as Walt Disney's Comics and Stories and in the Donald Duck newspaper strip.

Von Drake also appeared in a 1962 sequence of the annual Disney Christmas Story comic strip. In "Sleeping Beauty's Christmas Story", the professor helps Princess Aurora break Maleficent's spell.

Professor Von Drake has often been used by Italian cartoonists, including in some of the long sagas inspired by famous books that they usually produce with the Duck Family, such as "La storia di Marco Polo detta Il Milione" (free translation "The Million – A Story of Marco Polo") and "Paperino in: Il mondo perduto" (free translation "Donald in: The Lost World"). As a result, he has achieved significant popularity in Italy (where he is known as Pico De Paperis). He is portrayed in Italian comics as a scholar with multiple degrees in different subjects (even the more improbable ones) rather than a scientist.

== Video game appearances ==
Professor Von Drake appears in Mickey Saves the Day helping the main character (Mickey or Minnie; depending on the player's choice) to build a flying machine to rescue their partner.

He appears in Disney Magic Kingdoms as a playable character available to unlock for a limited time.

== See also ==
- List of duck universe characters
- Duck family (Disney)
