= Heinz Haber =

German physicist and science writer

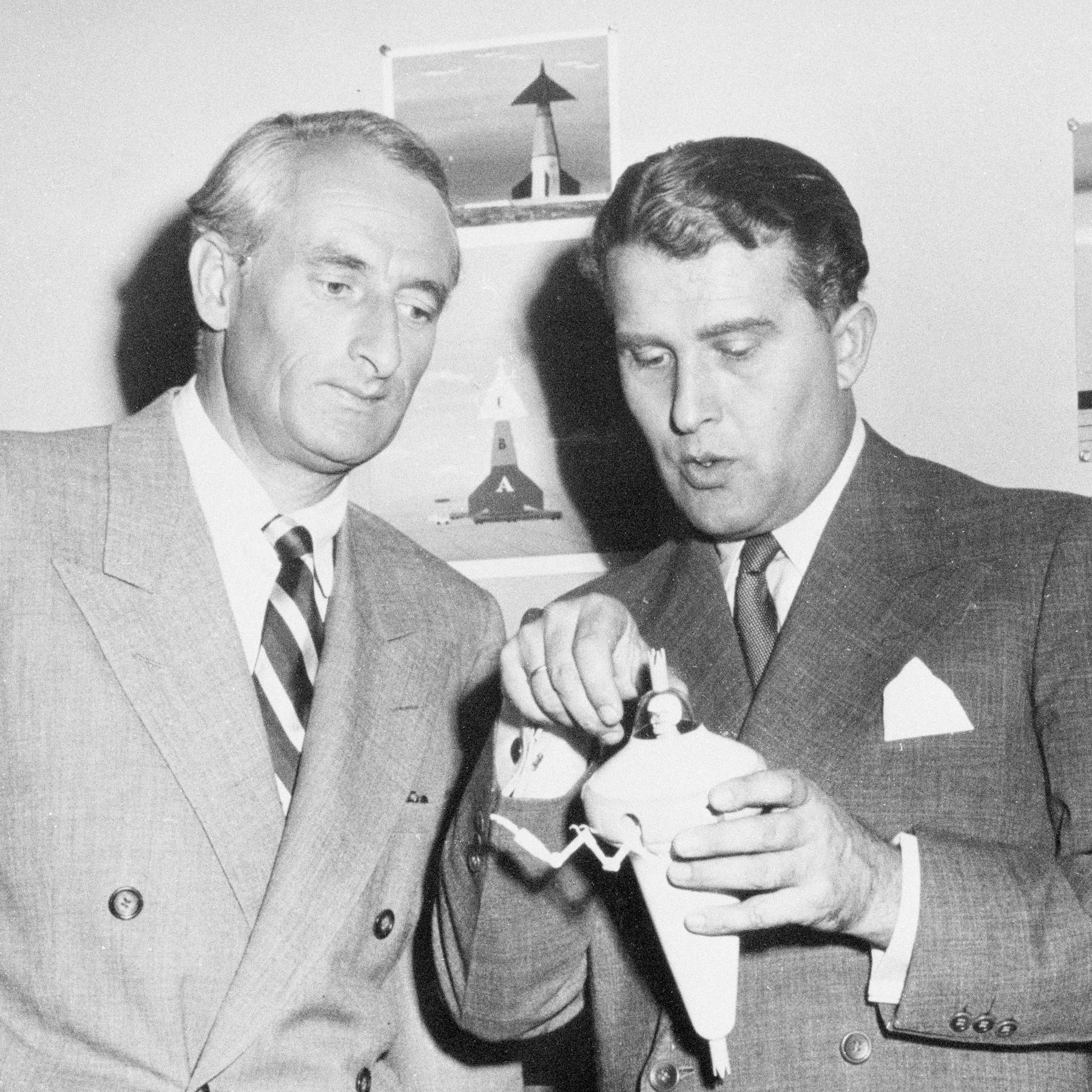
Heinz Haber (left) and Wernher von Braun, 1954

Heinz Haber (May 15, 1913 – February 13, 1990) was a German physicist and science writer who primarily became known for his TV programs and books about physics and environmental subjects. His lucid style of explaining hard science has frequently been imitated by later popular science presenters in Germany.

== Biography ==
Heinz Haber was born in Mannheim in 1913. His father, Carl Haber, was director of "Süddeutsche Zucker AG", now known as Südzucker. His older brother Fritz Haber was an Aerospace engineer.

He started studying physics in Leipzig, Heidelberg and Berlin 1932. In 1933, the year of its formation, he joined the German Air Sports Association, an organization set up by the Nazi Party that allowed him to learn flying as a fighter pilot. In 1934, he interrupted his studies to volunteer in the German Airforce, Luftwaffe, partaking in several deployments. At the end of this part of his military service he was promoted to ltd. of the reserve. He continued his studies obtaining his doctorate, Haber voluntarily participated in World War II for the German Luftwaffe as a reconnaissance aviator in the 2. Staffel der (Nah-)Aufklärungsgruppe 41, which was active in the Invasion of Poland and later the eastern Front. He served there until he was shot down and wounded 1942, shortly after being promoted to captain. He was awarded the Iron Cross 2nd Class (1939) and 1st Class (1940) during his service. He returned to the Kaiser-Wilhelm-Institut für Physik, where he headed a small Potsdam-based division constructing a diffraction spectrograph.

After the end of the war, Haber—as well as several other Germans involved in military research like Wernher von Braun—was targeted by Operation Paperclip with the aim of denying scientific expertise and knowledge to the Soviet Union and bringing researchers and scientists to the United States. Ultimately this operation resulted in a considerable contribution to the development of NASA. Haber at first stayed in the American zone and lectured at Heidelberg. In 1946, he emigrated to the United States and joined the USAF School of Aviation Medicine at Randolph Air Force Base. Together with fellow German Hubertus Strughold, he and his brother Dr. Fritz Haber (April 3, 1912 – August 21, 1998) made pioneering research into space medicine in the late 1940s. The brothers proposed parabolic flights for simulating weightlessness.

In 1952, he became associate physicist at UCLA. In the 1950s, Haber became the chief scientific consultant to Walt Disney productions. He later co-hosted Disney's Man in Space with von Braun. When the Eisenhower administration asked Disney to produce a show championing the civilian use of nuclear power, Heinz Haber was given the assignment. He hosted the Disney broadcast called Our Friend the Atom and wrote a popular children's book with the same title, both of which explained nuclear fission and fusion in simple terms. General Dynamics, a manufacturer of nuclear reactors, sponsored Our Friend the Atom and the nuclear submarine ride at Disneyland’s Tomorrowland. He is also credited with providing the story for Donald in Mathmagic Land.

In the 1960s and 1970s, he was known in Germany as a popular science spokesperson and wrote magazine columns and numerous books and presented his own TV programs like Professor Haber experimentiert, Das Mathematische Kabinett, Unser blauer Planet, Stirbt unser blauer Planet?, Professor Haber berichtet, and WAS IST WAS mit Professor Haber. He was founding editor of the German science magazine Bild der Wissenschaft from 1964 to 1990. His experiments included one where the onset of a nuclear chain reaction was simulated with hundreds of mousetraps, each one having been loaded with two ping pong balls.

Haber died in Hamburg in 1990 at age 76. He had two children, Kai (born 1943) and Cathleen (born 1945), from his first marriage, and a third child, Marc (born 1969), from the second. His first wife Anneliese lived and son Kai lives in Tucson, Arizona, his second wife Irmgard in Hamburg, Germany.

== Connection to war crimes ==
Haber was a member of several Nazi organizations, although not the Nazi Party. Testimonies portray Haber as an avid supporter of Hitler and the Third Reich. He collaborated with Hubertus Strughold and together they share authorship and several years of work experience on the topic of low pressure experimentation. Haber also quoted data gathered in the deadly experiments without raising any ethical issues in his writings. During his lifetime he never spoke out against these methods of his peers even though the fact that they happened was public knowledge after the Nuremberg medical trials. His claiming to have long had a desire to immigrate to the US in an interview for Operation Paperclip while also applying for a professorship in Germany is one of several indicators historians point to, labeling him as an adaptive opportunist.
