= Robin Hood (1973 film) =

Disney animated film

- Theatrical release poster
- Directed by: Wolfgang Reitherman
- Story by: Larry Clemmons; Ken Anderson; Vance Gerry; Frank Thomas; Eric Cleworth; Julius Svendsen; David Michener
- Produced by: Wolfgang Reitherman
- Starring: Peter Ustinov; Phil Harris; Brian Bedford; Terry-Thomas; Roger Miller; Pat Buttram; George Lindsey; Andy Devine
- Edited by: Tom Acosta; Jim Melton
- Music by: George Bruns
- Production company: Walt Disney Productions
- Distributed by: Buena Vista Distribution
- Release date: November 8, 1973
- Running time: 83 minutes
- Country: United States
- Language: English
- Budget: $5 million
- Box office: $33 million

Robin Hood is a 1973 American animated musical adventure comedy film produced by Walt Disney Productions and released by Buena Vista Distribution. Produced and directed by Wolfgang Reitherman, it is based on the English folktale "Robin Hood". Taking place in a world populated by anthropomorphic animals, the story follows the adventures of Robin Hood, Little John, and the inhabitants of Nottingham as they fight against the excessive taxation of Prince John, and Robin Hood wins the hand of Maid Marian. The film features the voices of Brian Bedford, Phil Harris, Peter Ustinov, Pat Buttram, Monica Evans, Terry-Thomas, Roger Miller, and Carole Shelley.

The idea to adapt Robin Hood into an animated feature was dated back to Walt Disney's interest in the tale of Reynard the Fox following the release of Snow White and the Seven Dwarfs (1937). The idea was repeatedly shelved for several decades. In 1968, Ken Anderson pitched a film adaptation of Robin Hood, incorporating ideas from Reynard the Fox by using anthropomorphic animals rather than humans. The project was approved, becoming the first completely "post-Walt" animated feature and the first with an entirely non-human cast.

Robin Hood was released on November 8, 1973. The film received mixed reviews from critics, but it was nonetheless a box-office success, grossing $33 million worldwide against a production budget of $5 million. The film's reputation has improved over time, although some retrospective reviews have criticized the heavy use of animation recycled from previous Disney films. It has since become a cult classic.

== Plot ==
In Medieval England amongst anthropomorphic animals, minstrel Alan-a-Dale narrates the story about an heroic outlaw named Robin Hood. He and his friend Little John live in Sherwood Forest, where they frequently rob rich people to give the money to poor people, while narrowly escaping capture by the Sheriff of Nottingham.

One day, the arrogant, greedy, and immature Prince John (who has usurped the throne from his brother King Richard after his aide-de-camp Sir Hiss hypnotized Richard into fighting in the Crusades) travels through Sherwood Forest on his way to Nottingham. Disguised as fortunetellers, Robin Hood and Little John rob the royal coach, embarrassing Prince John, who offers a very large reward for Robin's capture. Despite this, Robin continues his heroic missions, much to the gratitude of the Nottingham townspeople who are being overtaxed by Prince John, including a seven-year-old rabbit named Skippy who idolizes Robin Hood.

One day, local priest Friar Tuck meets Robin Hood and Little John at their forest hideaway, bringing news that Prince John will be hosting an archery tournament; the grand prize will be a kiss from King Richard's niece, Maid Marian, who was childhood sweethearts with Robin Hood and is still frequently on Robin's mind. Unaware that it is a trap set by Prince John, Robin, disguised as a Devonshire stork, competes in the contest, while Little John attends the contest disguised as the Duke of Chutney. Robin wins the competition; however, Prince John, who knows that only Robin Hood can shoot as well as the "stork" can, sees through Robin's disguise and sentences him to death. Maid Marian pleads for Robin's life; while they proclaim their love for each other, Little John gets Robin released by threatening Prince John with a dagger in his back. Suddenly, the Sheriff of Nottingham intervenes, and Prince John again orders Robin's death. Robin, Little John, Maid Marian, and her lady-in-waiting Lady Kluck fight Prince John's soldiers. During the fight, Robin proposes to Maid Marian, which she accepts.

Robin, Maid Marian, Lady Kluck, and Little John escape into Sherwood Forest, where Robin and Marian share a romantic evening. Arriving back at Robin's hideout, they are surprised to find the Nottingham villagers waiting for them. Little John sings a song that mocks Prince John's fraud and incompetence, which becomes extremely popular among the townspeople. When Prince John learns about the song, he is so offended that he triples the taxes on the villagers, all of whom are soon jailed when their money runs out.

Visiting Friar Tuck's now-empty church, the Sheriff of Nottingham takes the last farthing from the poor box. When Friar Tuck finally snaps and begins assaulting the Sheriff in his rage, he is arrested for high treason. Prince John orders his execution, planning to trap Robin Hood when Robin comes to rescue the Friar.

The night before the execution, Little John breaks into the jail and frees Friar Tuck, who then helps Little John free the other villagers. Meanwhile, Robin Hood sneaks into Prince John and Sir Hiss's bedroom and steals all the bags of money from the sleeping prince. Sir Hiss wakes up, realizes what is happening, and wakes up the prince. The Sheriff of Nottingham, who has fallen asleep while guarding the prison, also wakes up, and he, Prince John, and the castle guards try to stop the townspeople from escaping. Little John and the villagers escape, but Robin is trapped while rescuing Skippy's younger sister Tagalong. The Sheriff chases Robin with a lit torch, setting the castle on fire. Cornered, Robin evades Prince John's archers by jumping from a turret into the moat and swimming to safety. Sir Hiss, fed up with Prince John's constant abuse and failures, criticizes him for the plot, which resulted in his mother's castle being burned. Infuriated, Prince John chases Sir Hiss through the flames.

Some time later, King Richard returns from the Crusades. He pardons Robin Hood, forgives the villagers' taxes, and imprisons Prince John, Sir Hiss, and the Sheriff of Nottingham for their crimes. Robin and Maid Marian are married and ride off together, with Little John and Skippy in tow.

== Voice cast ==
- Brian Bedford as Robin Hood, a talented archer and smart-aleck outlaw. He is portrayed as a red fox.
- Monica Evans as Maid Marian, the niece of Prince John and King Richard and love interest of Robin Hood. She is portrayed as a red fox.
- Phil Harris as Little John, Robin Hood's loyal best friend. He is portrayed as a brown bear.
- Roger Miller as Alan-a-Dale, a minstrel who serves as the narrator of the film. He is portrayed as a rooster.
- Andy Devine as Friar Tuck, the priest of Nottingham. He is portrayed as a badger.
- Peter Ustinov as Prince John, the cowardly and ruthless Prince Regent of England and Maid Marian's uncle. Ustinov also voiced Prince John in the German version of the film. He is portrayed as a scrawny lion without a mane.
  - Ustinov also voices King Richard, John's older brother, the rightful King of England. Unlike John, Richard is depicted with a mane.
- Terry-Thomas as Sir Hiss, Prince John's advisor. Portrayed as a snake. May be representing Guy of Gisbourne due to that fact the character was originally going to be an assassin.
- Carole Shelley as Lady Kluck, the lady-in-waiting of Maid Marian. She is portrayed as a hen.
- Pat Buttram as the Sheriff of Nottingham. He is portrayed as a wolf.
- George Lindsey and Ken Curtis as Trigger and Nutsy, respectively, the Sheriff's guardsmen. They are portrayed as vultures.
- Billy Whitaker, Dana Laurita, Dori Whitaker, and Richie Sanders as Skippy, Sis, Tagalong, and Toby, respectively, local children of Nottingham who idolize Robin Hood. Skippy, Sis, and Tagalong are white rabbits while Toby is a tortoise.
- John Fiedler and Barbara Luddy as the Church of Nottingham's Sexton and his wife. They are portrayed as church mice.
  - Luddy also voices Mrs. Rabbit (Skippy, Sis, and Tagalong's mother).
- Candy Candido as the Captain of the Royal Guard. He is portrayed as a crocodile.
- J. Pat O'Malley as Otto the blacksmith. He is portrayed as a bloodhound.

== Production ==
"As director of story and character concepts, I knew right off that sly Robin Hood must be a fox. From there it was logical that Maid Marian should be a pretty vixen. Little John, legendarily known for his size, was easily a big overgrown bear.

Friar Tuck is great as a badger, but he was also great as a pig, as I had originally planned. Then I thought the symbol of a pig might be offensive to the Church, so we changed him. Richard the Lion-hearted, of course, had to be a regal, proud, strong lion; and his pathetic cousin [historically, and in the movie, his brother] Prince John, the weak villain, also had to be a lion, but we made him scrawny and childish. I originally thought of a snake as a member of the poor townspeople but one of the other men here suggested that a snake would be perfect as a slithering consort [Sir Hiss] to mean Prince John."

— Ken Anderson

During production on Snow White and the Seven Dwarfs in 1937, Walt Disney became interested in adapting the twelfth-century legend of Reynard the Fox. However, the project languished due to Disney's concern that Reynard was an unsuitable choice for a hero. In a meeting held on February 12, 1938, Disney commented:

I see swell possibilities in 'Reynard', but is it smart to make it? We have such a terrific kid audience ... parents and kids together. That's the trouble – too sophisticated. We'll take a nosedive doing it with animals.

For Treasure Island (1950), Disney seriously considered three animated sections, each one of the Reynard tales, to be told by Long John Silver to Jim Hawkins as moral fables. Ultimately, the idea was nixed as Treasure Island became the studio's first fully live-action film. In the next decade, the studio decided to make Reynard the villain of a musical feature film based on Edmond Rostand's Chanticleer, but the production was scrapped in favor of The Sword in the Stone (1963).

In October 1968, Ken Anderson went on a fishing trip with Disney Studios president Card Walker. There, Walker suggested that a classic tale should be the subject for the next animated film after The Aristocats (1970). Anderson proposed the tale of Robin Hood, to which Walker responded enthusiastically. Back at the studio, Anderson relayed the idea during a story meeting on The Aristocats which was met with approval. In a follow-up meeting, with Wolfgang Reitherman, Bill Anderson (no relation), and Larry Clemmons, Ken Anderson was assigned the job to begin "exploratory animal character drawings". On his own, Anderson blended his ideas for the character Robin Hood by conceptualizing him as a slick fox that still used his skills to protect the community.

Additionally, Anderson wanted to set the film in the Deep South desiring to recapture the spirit of Song of the South (1946). Anderson explained, "Basically I had a wonderful time on Song of the South, and I know that all of my friends in animation did. They loved the part I played and I loved the part they played ... And so it was an attempt on my part to get the best of that sort of thing and get it going on again, bring it up-to-date." However, the Disney Studios executives had precautions because of the racial controversy surrounding Song of the South. Reitherman further overruled Anderson's creative suggestion by setting the film in its traditional English location as inspired by The Story of Robin Hood and His Merrie Men (1952). Clemmons came on board the project to write a story outline with dialogue that was later storyboarded by other artists.

As production went further along, Robin Allan stated in his book Walt Disney and Europe that "Ken Anderson wept when he saw how his character concepts had been processed into stereotypes for the animation on Robin Hood." According to Frank Thomas and Ollie Johnston, one such casualty was the concept of making the Sheriff of Nottingham a goat as an artistic experiment to try different animals for a villain, only to be overruled by Reitherman who wanted to keep to the villainous stereotype of a wolf instead. Additionally, Anderson wanted to include the Merry Men into the film, which was again overridden by Reitherman because he wanted a "buddy picture" reminiscent of Butch Cassidy and the Sundance Kid (1969). Little John was the only Merry Man retained in the film, while Friar Tuck was put as a friend of Robin's who lived in Nottingham, and Alan-a-Dale was turned into the narrator.

Because of the time spent on developing several settings, and auditioning actors to voice the title character, production fell behind schedule. In order to meet its deadline, the animators had no other choice but to recycle several dance sequences from previous Disney animated films, including Snow White and the Seven Dwarfs (1937), The Jungle Book (1967), and The Aristocats (1970) that are used in the "Phony King of England" scene.

=== Casting ===
By October 1970, most of the voice actors were confirmed, with the exception of Tommy Steele cast in the title role. Steele himself was chosen because of his performance in The Happiest Millionaire (1967) while Peter Ustinov was cast because Walt Disney had enjoyed his presence on the set of Blackbeard's Ghost (1968). However, Steele was unable to make his character sound more heroic, and his replacement came down to final two candidates which were Bernard Fox and Brian Bedford. Disney executives had first seen Bedford performing onstage in Los Angeles, in which they brought him in to test for the role in May 1971 and ultimately cast him. Meanwhile, Louis Prima was so angered at not being considered for a role that he personally paid the recording expenses for the subsequent album, Let's "Hear" it For Robin Hood, which he sold to Disneyland Records.

== Release ==
For the fiscal year 1973, Walt Disney Productions began its year-round celebration of the studio's 50th anniversary. Robin Hood was scheduled to open during Christmas time, timed to coincide with the 25th anniversary of Snow White and the Seven Dwarfs (1937). For the pre-release promotional campaign for Robin Hood, a ten-minute excerpt from the film aired on January 21, 1973 during the "50 Happy Years" episode for The Wonderful World of Disney television program. Veteran Disney animators and other personalities began a twenty-city promotional tour making network and syndicated television appearances. The costumed characters from the film also appeared at exclusive press and exhibitor previews at the Disney Studios in Burbank, California and Walt Disney World in Orlando, Florida.

On November 8, 1973, Robin Hood premiered as the Christmas attraction at the Radio City Music Hall. On Thanksgiving Day, Pat Boone hosted an hour-long, nationally televised tribute to the Disney corporation prior to the 47th annual broadcast of Macy's Thanksgiving Day Parade in New York. Both the pre-show and parade activities featured costumed characters from the film. Robin Hood was later released in 400 theaters across the United States and Canada on December 21. The film was re-released on March 26, 1982.

=== Home media ===
The film was first released on VHS, CED, Betamax, and Laserdisc on December 3, 1984, becoming the debut installment of the Walt Disney Classics home video line. Disney had thought the idea of releasing any of its animated classics (known as the "untouchables") might threaten future theatrical reissue revenue. However, Robin Hood was viewed as the first choice since it was not held in such high esteem as some of the other titles. The VHS counterpart was re-released several times. The release went into moratorium in April 1987. 4 years after the moratorium, it was re-issued as a permanent availability title on July 12, 1991. The film was re-released on VHS six more times; on October 28, 1994, March 3, 1995, October 4, 1995, February 28, 1996, July 15, 1997, March 31, 1998, and July 13, 1999, in the Walt Disney Masterpiece Collection line.

In January 2000, Walt Disney Home Video launched the Gold Classic Collection. Six months later, Robin Hood was re-released on VHS and DVD in the line on July 4, 2000, and remained in stock until the spring of 2006. The DVD contained the film in its 1.33:1 aspect ratio, and was accompanied with special features including a trivia game and the cartoon short "Ye Olden Days". The remastered "Most Wanted Edition" DVD ("Special Edition" in the UK) was released on November 28, 2006, in a 16:9 matted transfer to represent its original theatrical screen ratio. It also featured a deleted scene/alternate ending of Prince John attempting to kill a wounded Robin Hood. On August 6, 2013, the film was released as the 40th Anniversary Edition on a Blu-ray combo pack.

== Reception ==
=== Critical reaction ===
Judith Crist of New York magazine wrote the film was "nicely tongue-in-cheek without insult to the intelligence of either child or adult." She also stated that it "has class – in the fine cast that gives both voice and personality to the characters, in the bright and brisk dialogue, in its overall concept." Vincent Canby of The New York Times wrote that it "should ... be a good deal of fun for toddlers whose minds have not yet shriveled into orthodoxy" and he called the visual style "charmingly conventional". Dave Billington of The Montreal Gazette wrote: "As a film, Robin Hood marks a come-back of sorts for the Disney people. Ever since the old maestro died, the cartoon features have shown distressing signs of a drop in quality, both in art work and in voice characterization. But the blending of appealing cartoon animals with perfect voices for the part makes Robin Hood an excellent evening out for the whole family." Also writing in New York magazine, Ruth Gilbert called it "a sweet, funny, slam-bang, good-hearted Walt Disney feature cartoon with a fine cast" and wrote it was "a feast for the eyes for kiddies and Disney nostalgics."

Charles Champlin of the Los Angeles Times wrote that the Disney "hallmarks are there as they ever were: the incomparably rich, full animation, the humanized animal characters perky, individual and enchanting, and the wild, inventive slapstick action." Awarding the film four stars out of five, Ian Nathan, in a retrospective review for Empire, praised the vocal performances of Peter Ustinov and Terry-Thomas acknowledging "while this is hardly the most dazzling of animated features, it has that cut-corner feel that seem to hold sway in the '70s (mainly because Disney were cutting corners), the characters spark to life, and the story remains as rock steady as ever."

Among less favorable reviews, Jay Cocks of Time magazine gave the film a mixed verdict writing, "Even at its best, Robin Hood is only mildly diverting. There is not a single moment of the hilarity or deep, eerie fear that the Disney people used to be able to conjure up, or of the sort of visual invention that made the early features so memorable. Robin Hood's basic problem is that it is rather too pretty and good natured." Gene Siskel of the Chicago Tribune gave the film one-and-a-half stars out of four, describing the film as "80 minutes of pratfalls and nincompoop dialog," and criticizing the animation quality as "Saturday morning TV cartoon stuff." John Baxter of The Monthly Film Bulletin wrote that "for the most part the film is as bland and one-dimensional as the product of less sophisticated studios; and except for Peter Ustinov's plummy Prince John, the voice characterisations are as insipid as the animation is unoriginal."

Decades since the film's release, the film has been noted for the recycled scenes of animation. The review aggregator website Rotten Tomatoes reported that the film received a 58% approval rating with an average rating of 5.7/10 based on 31 reviews. The website's consensus states that "One of the weaker Disney adaptations, Robin Hood is cute and colorful but lacks the majesty and excitement of the studio's earlier efforts." Metacritic gave the film a score of 57 based on 9 reviews, indicating "mixed or average reviews".

=== Box office ===
During its initial release, Robin Hood earned $9.6 million in rentals in the United States and Canada. It also grossed $18 million in foreign territories, which was at the time a Disney record, for a worldwide rental of $27.5 million.

The film has earned a lifetime gross in the United States and Canada between $32–35 million across its two releases.

=== Accolades ===
Award	Category	Nominee(s)	Result	Ref.
Academy Awards	Best Song	"Love"; Music by George Bruns; Lyrics by Floyd Huddleston	Nominated	
Grammy Awards	Best Recording for Children	Robin Hood; Roger Miller and Various Artists	Nominated	

== Music ==
Robin Hood

Studio album by Various artists
- Released: 1973
- Recorded: 1969–1973
- Genres: Classical, soundtrack, classic pop
- Label: Disneyland Records

In 1969, Roger Miller began composing the songs for the film. A record of the film was made at the time of its release in 1973, which included its songs, score, narration, and dialogue. Both "Oo-De-Lally" and "Love" appear on the CD collection, Classic Disney: 60 Years of Musical Magic. "Love" is featured in the soundtrack for the 2009 film Fantastic Mr. Fox, directed by Wes Anderson. The full soundtrack of the film was released on August 4, 2017, as part of the Walt Disney Records: The Legacy Collection series on compact disc and digital.

The song "The Phony King of England" bears a strong resemblance to a much older, bawdy English folk song, "The Bastard King of England".

In 1997, Canadian art student Deidre LaCarte created a GeoCities page known as "Hampster Dance" which featured rows of animated GIFs of hamsters and other rodents dancing to a nine-second looped WAV file sampled from "Whistle Stop". In April 1999, capitalizing on the popularity of the website, English electronic group the Cuban Boys released "Cognoscenti vs. Intelligentsia", which peaked at number four on the UK Singles Chart. In its original release, the track featured a sped-up sample of "Whistle Stop". When the song was commercially released later that December, it was replaced with a soundalike sample. In June 2000, Deidre LaCarte partnered with producers The Boomtang Boys to release a site-sponsored novelty song, "The Hampsterdance Song", which also contained a sound-alike sample of "Whistle Stop". Disney did not authorize the use of the actual "Whistle Stop" clip, so an original recording sung by Boomtang Boys member Rob DeBoer was created and used instead; liner notes for the single state: "Includes elements of 'Whistle Stop' by Roger Miller."

=== Songs ===
Original songs performed in the film include:

No.	Title	Writer(s)	Performer(s)	Length
1.	"Whistle Stop"	Roger Miller	Roger Miller
2.	"Oo-De-Lally"	Roger Miller	Roger Miller
3.	"Love"	Floyd Huddleston & George Bruns	Nancy Adams
4.	"The Phony King of England"	Johnny Mercer	Phil Harris
5.	"Not in Nottingham"	Roger Miller	Roger Miller
6.	"Whistle Stop (Reprise)"		Roger Miller
7.	"Oo-De-Lally (Reprise)"		Disney Studio Chorus

== Legacy ==
The film has since become a fan favorite. Disney animator and director Byron Howard admitted that Robin Hood was his favorite film while growing up and cited it as a major influence on Zootopia.. Some of the characters from the film also cameoed in the 1983 Oscar-nominated featurette short Mickey's Christmas Carol. The film was nominated for a spot on AFI's 10 Top 10 by American Film Institute in 2008 for the Animated Film list.

The song "Love" was featured in the 2009 feature film Fantastic Mr. Fox. as well as on the 2023 Amazon.com Super Bowl ad "Saving Sawyer". The song "Whistle-Stop" was sped up and used in the Hampster Dance, one of the earliest internet memes, and later used at normal speed in the Super Bowl XLVIII commercial for T-Mobile. The song "Oo De Lally" is featured in a 2015 commercial for Android which shows animals of different species playing together.

Robin Hood, Little John, Maid Marian, Prince John and Sir Hiss appear as playable characters in the video game Disney Magic Kingdoms, along with attractions based on Sherwood Forest and Nottingham. In the game, the characters are involved in new storylines that serve as a continuation of the events of the film.

Sir Hiss (voiced by Henri Lubatti) is one of the antagonists in the 2025 Lego special for Disney+ Lego Disney Princess: Villains Unite.

=== Cancelled CGI remake ===
In April 2020, it was reported that Disney was developing a live-action/CG hybrid remake of Robin Hood featuring the same kind of anthropomorphic characters as in the 1973 film, with Kari Granlund writing, Carlos López Estrada directing (after previously directing the Academy Award-nominated Raya and the Last Dragon), and Justin Springer producing. The remake was set to be released exclusively on Disney+. In March 2026, López Estrada stated the project was not moving forward.

== See also ==
- List of films and television series featuring Robin Hood
- The Story of Robin Hood and His Merrie Men (1952), live-action feature film produced by Walt Disney Productions
- Cultural depictions of John of England
- List of American films of 1973

== Bibliography ==
- Grant, John (1998). The Encyclopedia of Walt Disney's Animated Characters: From Mickey Mouse to Hercules. Disney Editions. ISBN 978-0-7868-6336-5.
- Ghez, Didier, ed. (2010). "Ken Anderson". "Walt's People: Volume 9—Talking Disney with the Artists who Knew Him" (Interview). Interviewed by Christopher Finch and Linda Rosenkrantz. Xlibris. pp. 127–133. ISBN 978-1-450-08746-9.
- Ghez, Didier (2019). They Drew as They Pleased Vol. 5: The Hidden Art of Disney's Early Renaissance. Chronicle Books. ISBN 978-1-797-20410-9.
- Koenig, David (1997). Mouse Under Glass: Secrets of Disney Animation & Theme Parks. Irvine, California: Bonaventure Press. pp. 149–152. ISBN 978-0-964-06051-7.
