= MuchMusic Video Award for Best Dance Video =

The following is a list of the MuchMusic Video Awards winners for Best Dance Video.

Year	Artist	Video	Ref
1990	Mitsou	"Bye Bye Mon Cowboy"	
1991	Dance Appeal	"Can't Repress the Cause"	
1992	Lisa Lougheed	"Love Vibe"	
1993	Lisa Lougheed	"Won't Give Up My Music"	
1994	Temperance	"Music Is My Life"	
1995	Camille	"A Deeper Shade of Love"	
1996	BKS	"Astroplane"	
1997	Bran Van 3000	"Drinking in L.A."	
1998	Love Inc.	"Broken Bones"	
1999	The Boomtang Boys f. Kim Esty	"Squeeze Toy"	
2000	Love Inc.	"Here Comes the Sunshine"	
2001	Sky	"You"	
