= The Hampsterdance Song =

2000 single by Hampton the Hampster

Single by Hampton the Hampster

from the album Hampsterdance: The Album
- Released: June 13, 2000
- Genre: Novelty; dance
- Length: 3:34
- Label: Koch Entertainment
- Songwriters: Roger Miller; Rob DeBoer; Anthony Grace; Paul Grace
- Producer: The Boomtang Boys

Hampton the Hampster singles chronology
"The Hampsterdance Song" (2000)	"Thank God I'm a Country Boy" (2000)

Music video
- "The Hampsterdance Song" on YouTube

"The Hampsterdance Song" is a novelty song by Hampton the Hampster. The song's hook is based on a sped-up sample of "Whistle-Stop", a song from the 1973 Disney film Robin Hood. This sample was originally used for a 1998 web page called the Hampster Dance, created by Canadian art student Deidre LaCarte. Using the web page's popularity as a springboard, she and a Toronto native, Jeffery Lane, worked together with Canadian remix duo the Boomtang Boys to create a full song out of the sample. Due to licensing issues with Disney, Rob DeBoer and Tony Grace of the Boomtang Boys re-recorded the sample and added new lyrics.

Produced by the Boomtang Boys, "The Hampsterdance Song" was released as a single on June 13, 2000, by Koch Entertainment. In Canada, the song topped the Canadian Singles Chart and received airplay, reaching number 32 on the RPM 100 Hit Tracks chart. The song also became a top-five hit in Australia, peaking at number five on the ARIA Singles Chart in March 2001. In the United States, the song peaked at number four on the Billboard Maxi-Singles Sales chart. An animated music video was created for the song starring four Hampsters named Hampton, Hado, Dixie and Fuzzy.

== Background and release ==
"The Hampsterdance Song" originated from a web page called the Hampster Dance, created by Deidre LaCarte in mid-1998 as a competition with her sister Melanie and friend Hazel Steenman on who could launch the busiest website. The Hampster Dance soon received heavy Internet traffic and sponsorship, leading to merchandise inspired by the fad as well as numerous imitations. About a year after the page's creation, Jeffery Lane saw the web page and believed it had more potential in the entertainment industry, so he contacted LaCarte and Steenman in October 1999. Before they could start working together, an English production team, Cuban Boys, used the "Whistle-Stop" sample as a basis for their 1999 song "Cognoscenti vs. Intelligentsia" (or "C vs. I"), which was released immediately before Lane planned to move ahead with the song's creation. "C vs. I" peaked at number four on the UK Singles Chart and prompted LaCarte to call her lawyer, but no action was taken.

In early 2000, Lane met LaCarte and Steenman in person, when he revealed to them that he had worked with the Boomtang Boys—who had recently had chart success with their hit "Squeeze Toy"—to create "The Hampsterdance Song". Lane knew his song would experience similar levels of popularity if he used the same "Whistle-Stop" hook from the Cuban Boys' pastiche and because pop groups such as Aqua and Vengaboys were prominent at the time. After the Boomtang Boys resolved the licensing issues involved with the "Whistle-Stop" sample, they increased the song's volume so that it would emulate a track heard in a club. Realizing "The Hampsterdance Song" was finished by this point, they finalized the track, issued it commercially, and began working on an album of similar material. In Canada, Koch Entertainment released the song on June 13, 2000, while it the United States, it was issued as a maxi-CD single on July 4, 2000. The CD contains a radio edit, an extended mix and a club mix of the track. The same CD was issued in Australia, and a German CD omitting the club mix was also issued, with ZYX Music as the record label. Various other maxi-CDs were also distributed across Germany, including a Christmas edition.

== Composition ==
The main hook of "The Hampsterdance Song" originates from the 1973 animated Disney film Robin Hood. During the film's opening, Alan-a-Dale sings "Whistle-Stop", performed by Roger Miller. LaCarte was sent a sped-up sample of this composition from her sister. Disney did not allow the sample to be used in the single, so an original recording sung by the Boomtang Boys member Rob DeBoer was created and used instead. The rap portion of the song was performed by the other member, Tony Grace. Musically, "The Hampsterdance Song" is a novelty and dance song with high-pitched vocals reminiscent of the Chipmunks.

== Critical reception ==
Reviewing the song on their July 8, 2000, issue, Billboard magazine called the track "silly" and a "guilty pleasure" but pointed out its appeal for dance clubs and young audiences. In November 2009, The Village Voice writer Maura Johnston named the track one of "The 50 Worst Songs of the '00s", calling it a "threadbare, madness-inducing dance tune" and noting that it influenced the contemporary process of how remixes bring attention to an original composition.

== Commercial performance ==
Following its release, "The Hampsterdance Song" debuted at the top of the Canadian Singles Chart on July 15, 2000. Its initial tenure at number one lasted until August 19, when it lost its peak to the Moffatts' "Bang Bang Boom". The following week, it returned to number one, where it stayed for another week until Madonna's "Music" replaced it. The song then slowly dropped down the chart, making its final appearance in the top 20 on May 5, 2001. In 2001, Nielsen SoundScan ranked it as Canada's 50th-best-selling single of the year. It was also a top-40 hit on Canadian radio, rising to number 32 on the RPM 100 Hit Tracks listing on July 31, 2000.

In the United States, the song first appeared on the Billboard Hot Country Singles & Tracks ranking, debuting at its peak of number 70 on the issue of August 26, 2000. On the Maxi-Singles Sales chart, the track debuted at number four, its highest position, on September 2, 2000. The single stayed in the top 50 for 37 weeks, until May 19, 2001, when it dropped off the chart from number 47. Ten years after its release, on July 22, 2010, the track topped the Billboard Kid Digital Songs chart. On Radio Disney, the song was a mainstay throughout 2000. In Germany, the single entered the German Singles Chart at number 91 on November 6, 2000. Two weeks later, it rose to its peak of number 60, remaining in the top 100 for a further six weeks. On Australia's ARIA Singles Chart, "The Hampsterdance Song" stayed in the top 50 for 10 weeks, peaking at number five on March 18, 2001, five weeks after its debut. It ended 2001 as Australia's 83rd-most-successful single and earned a gold certification from the Australian Recording Industry Association (ARIA), denoting shipments exceeding 35,000 copies.

== Music video ==
The song's animated music video features four Hampsters: Hampton, Fuzzy, Dixie and Hado. The video received copious rotation on Canadian television channel MuchMusic. In 2000, Canadian sock puppet Ed the Sock named this video the "Cheesiest Video of the Year" during his Fromage "F2K" television special.

== Track listings ==
All songs were written by Roger Miller, Rob DeBoer, Anthony Grace and Paul Grace except "Jingle Bells" and "Deck the Halls", which are traditional compositions arranged by Harout Der Hovagimian.

US and Australian CD single

1. "The Hampsterdance Song" (radio edit)
2. "The Hampsterdance Song" (extended mix)
3. "The Hampsterdance Song" (club mix)

German CD single

1. "The Hampsterdance Song" (radio edit) – 3:43
2. "The Hampsterdance Song" (extended mix) – 5:18

German maxi-CD single

1. "The Hampsterdance Song" (radio edit) – 3:43
2. "The Hampsterdance Song" (extended mix) – 5:18
3. "The Hampsterdance Song" (club mix) – 5:32
4. "The Hampsterdance Song" (Snapshot mix) – 5:23
5. "The Hampsterdance Song" (Tom Stevens mix) – 7:34
6. "The Hampsterdance Song" (video)
- A version without the video was also released.

German maxi-CD single—Christmas edition

1. "The Hampsterdance Song" (radio edit) – 3:43
2. "Jingle Bells" – 3:18
3. "Deck the Halls" – 3:09

== Charts ==
=== Weekly charts ===
Chart (2000–2001)	Peak position
Australia (ARIA)	5
Canada (Nielsen SoundScan)	1
Canada Top Singles (RPM)	32
Germany (GfK)	60
US Hot Country Singles & Tracks (Billboard)	70
US Maxi-Singles Sales (Billboard)	4

Chart (2010)	Position
US Kid Digital Songs (Billboard)	1

=== Year-end charts ===
Chart (2000)	Position
US Maxi-Singles Sales (Billboard)	24

Chart (2001)	Position
Australia (ARIA)	83
Canada (Nielsen SoundScan)	50

== Certifications ==
Region	Certification	Certified units/sales
Australia (ARIA)	Gold	35,000^{^}
^{^} Shipments figures based on certification alone.
