= Love (Disney song) =

Song from the 1973 Robin Hood film

"Love" is a song from Walt Disney's film Robin Hood with the lyrics and music by Floyd Huddleston and George Bruns. Its lyrics were sung by Huddleston's wife Nancy Adams instead of Monica Evans, who voiced Maid Marian for the rest of the film. The song plays over a scene where Robin and Marian express their feelings for each other.

The song was nominated for the Academy Award for Best Original Song. Jodie Foster and Johnny Whitaker performed a singing duet together of their version on stage at the 46th Academy Awards, but the song lost to "The Way We Were" from the film of the same name.

The song was also used in the soundtrack for the 2009 film Fantastic Mr. Fox, directed by Wes Anderson, as well as on the 2023 Amazon.com Super Bowl ad "Saving Sawyer".
