= Floyd Huddleston =

American lyricist (1918–1991)

- Born: August 19, 1918; Leland, Mississippi, U.S.
- Died: September 27, 1991 (aged 73); Panorama City, Los Angeles, California, U.S.
- Occupations: Lyricist; screenwriter; television producer
- Spouse: Nancy Adams (m. 1965; died 1991)
- Children: 1
- Musical career
- Genres: Musical film; musical theatre
- Years active: 1949–1991

Floyd Huddleston (August 19, 1918 – September 27, 1991) was an American lyricist, screenwriter, and television producer. He wrote hundreds of songs, often for movies, and was nominated for an Academy Award in 1974.

== Career ==
Huddleston was born in Leland, Mississippi, and would later sing and write songs for Glenn Miller's Army Air Force Band during World War II. After he was discharged, Huddleston came to California where he was under contract with Decca Records in 1949. There, he co-wrote with Al Rinker an estimated 800 songs, some of which were recorded by Frank Sinatra, Judy Garland, and Sarah Vaughan. Soon after, Huddleston would compose lyrics for theater productions such as Shuffle Along and The New Ziegfeld Follies.

Later in his life, he wrote lyrics for songs in several films, including The Ballad of Josie (1967) and Midnight Cowboy (1969). For Disney, he contributed the song, "Everybody Wants to be a Cat", to The Aristocats (1970). For Robin Hood (1973), he and George Bruns were nominated for an Academy Award for the song "Love," sung by his wife, Nancy Adams. Huddleston would also produce unused songs for a proposed version of The Rescuers (1977) with songs performed by Louis Prima with Sam Butera and the Witnesses. In 1978, he not only produced and composed songs, but wrote the script for the TV special Lucy Comes to Nashville, starring Lucille Ball.

== Personal life and death ==
On December 30, 1965, Huddleston married Nancy Adams, a commercial jingle singer, at the First Baptist Church chapel in Memphis, Tennessee.

Huddleston died from a heart attack on September 27, 1991, at a hospital located in Panorama City, Los Angeles. Huddleston was survived by his wife Nancy, his son, Huston Huddleston, and his mother, Hettye T. Huddleston. At the time of his death, Huddleston was working on a musical titled Brother Elwood's Gospel Truck.

== Discography ==
=== With His Family Singers ===
- Happy Birthday Jesus (Dobre Records DR1013, 1977)
