= Hampsterdance: The Album =

Studio album by Hampton the Hampster
- Released: October 24, 2000
- Genre: Children's; novelty
- Length: 50:06
- Label: Koch
- Producer: The Boomtang Boys; DJ Iain; Perry Alexander; Rachid Wehbi; Snoog; 303D

Hampton the Hampster chronology
Hampsterdance: The Album (2000)	The Hampster Dance Party (2002)

Singles from Hampsterdance: The Album
- 1. "The Hampsterdance Song" Released: June 13, 2000; 2. "Thank God I'm a Country Boy" Released: 2001; 3. "Hampster Party" Released: 2001; 4. "Hampsterdance Christmas" Released: 2001

Hampsterdance: The Album (also referred to as The Hampsterdance Album) is the debut album by Hampton the Hampster, released on October 24, 2000, through Koch Records. It was produced by the Canadian producer team the Boomtang Boys after the success of the novelty track "The Hampsterdance Song" featuring the hamster character Hampton, which was created by Canadian art student Deidre LaCarte as an Internet meme in 1998. The album reached the top 10 of the charts in Australia, where it was certified gold by ARIA. It produced the additional singles "Thank God I'm a Country Boy" (a cover of the John Denver track), "Hampster Party" and "Hampsterdance Christmas" (which included the tracks "Jingle Bells" and "Deck the Halls"), the former two of which charted at numbers 12 and 44 in Australia, respectively.

== Critical reception ==
Professional ratings
Review scores
Source	Rating
AllMusic	3/5 stars

Reviewing the album for AllMusic, MacKenzie Wilson described it as "a fun-spirited collection of children's rock tunes" with "tones [that] are vibrant, equally enjoyable for any youngster" that "plays into club-dance and R&B elements for some hooky singalongs". Wilson highlighted the cover of Sly and the Family Stone's "Dance to the Music" for its "classic samples".

== Track listing ==
Hampsterdance: The Album track listing
No.	Title	Length
1.	"The Hampsterdance Song"	3:32
2.	"Hampster Party"	3:17
3.	"Even Hampsters Fall in Love"	4:24
4.	"Thank God I'm a Country Boy"	2:42
5.	"A Hampster's Life"	3:56
6.	"Dance to the Music"	3:40
7.	"Dreaming"	3:35
8.	"Birdie Song"	2:42
9.	"Spin the Wheel"	3:51
10.	"Hampsters Get the Blues"	3:58
11.	"Round and Round"	4:27
12.	"Everybody Feel the Groove"	3:35
13.	"Jingle Bells"	3:10
14.	"Deck the Halls"	3:17
Total length:		50:06

== Personnel ==
- The Boomtang Boys – producers, executive producers
- Nick Rawson – mastering (at The Other Studio)
- Jeff Chenault – art direction and design

== Charts ==
Chart performance for Hampsterdance: The Album
Chart (2001)	Peak position
Australian Albums (ARIA)	7

== Certifications ==
Certifications for Hampsterdance: The Album
Region	Certification	Certified units/sales
Australia (ARIA)	Gold	35,000^{^}
^{^} Shipments figures based on certification alone.
