= George Bruns =

American composer (1914–83)

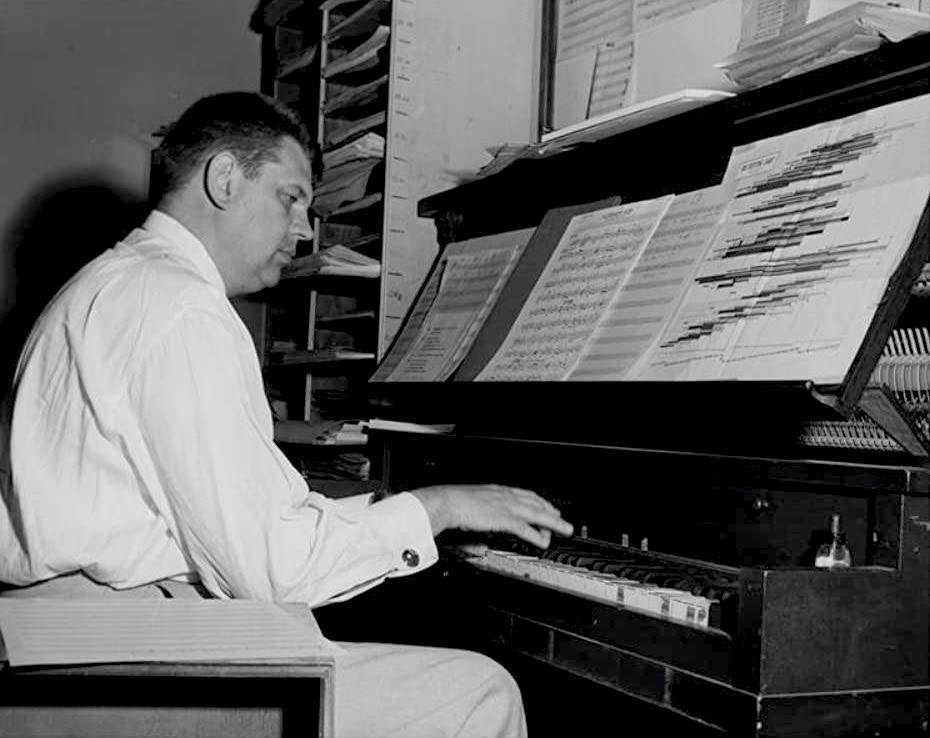
- Bruns in 1955

Background information
- Born: July 3, 1914; Sandy, Oregon, U.S.
- Died: May 23, 1983 (aged 68) Portland, Oregon, U.S.
- Genres: Film score; jazz
- Occupations: Composer; conductor; musician
- Instruments: Trombone; tuba; double bass; piano
- Years active: 1930s–1983

George Edward Bruns (July 3, 1914 – May 23, 1983) was an American composer of music for film and television. His accolades include four Academy Award nominations and three Grammy Award nominations. He is mainly known for his compositions for numerous Disney films from the 1950s to the 1970s, among them Sleeping Beauty (1959), One Hundred and One Dalmatians, The Absent-Minded Professor (both 1961), The Sword in the Stone (1963), The Jungle Book (1967), The Love Bug (1968), The Aristocats (1970), and Robin Hood (1973).

A native of Sandy, Oregon, Bruns began playing piano at age six. After graduating from Oregon State University, he worked as a bandleader at the Multnomah Hotel in Portland before relocating to Los Angeles to further pursue a musical career. In 1953, Bruns was hired as a musical arranger at Walt Disney Studios, eventually going on to become the studio's music director, a role he served from the mid 1950s until his retirement in 1976.

Over the course of his career, Bruns was nominated for four Academy Awards for his work on Disney films, including Scoring of a Musical Picture for Sleeping Beauty and Babes in Toyland (1961), and Best Adaptation or Treatment for The Sword in the Stone. He received his final nomination for Best Original Song for the track "Love" from Robin Hood.

Bruns spent his later years in his native Oregon, composing music and instructing at Lewis & Clark College. He died in Portland in 1983 of a heart attack. In 2001, he was posthumously inducted as a Disney Legend.

== Biography ==
=== Early life ===
George Edward Bruns was born on July 3, 1914, in Sandy, Oregon one of three children born to Augusta (née Weyer) and Edward Bruns. He had one older and one younger sister. His father was a lumber mill proprietor, and built the first lumber mill on Mount Hood, which was eventually relocated to Sandy. Bruns expressed interest in music at an early age: He began playing piano at age six, and subsequently learned how to play the bass tuba. He eventually became proficient in 15 different instruments, and began performing with a high school band while still in elementary school.

He attended and graduated from Sandy High School, and went on to study engineering at Oregon State University, where he was a member of Lambda Chi Alpha fraternity. In the 1930s he worked as a musician with various groups in the Portland, Oregon, area, and also performed in a traveling band. In 1946 he was appointed musical director at radio station KEX in Portland, and also was the bandleader for the Rose Bowl room of the Multnomah Hotel. From 1947 to 1949 he performed and recorded on trombone with Portland's Castle Jazz Band, led by banjoist Monte Ballou.

=== Career with Walt Disney ===
In the late 1940s, he moved to Los Angeles, where he did studio work, performed, and recorded with trombonist Turk Murphy's Jazz Band. In 1953, he was hired by Walt Disney as an arranger, eventually becoming Disney's musical director, a position he held until his retirement in 1976. Despite his retirement, he continued to work on Disney projects.

During the mid-1950s in 1953 at the Disney Studio, his first assignment was when he composed and adapted the music from Tchaikovsky's Sleeping Beauty ballet for use as background score in the 1959 Disney film version. In addition to composing live action films such as The Absent-Minded Professor and Babes in Toyland, he went on to compose the scores for One Hundred and One Dalmatians, The Sword in the Stone, The Jungle Book, and The Aristocats. The last Disney animated film he arranged the score for was Robin Hood. Bruns also provided Herbie the Love Bug with his sprightly theme song, featured prominently throughout the series. Among his other works include the song "Yo Ho (A Pirate's Life for Me)" (which he co-wrote with Xavier Atencio) from the Disney theme park attraction Pirates of the Caribbean and later used in the film series based on that ride, "The Ballad of Davy Crockett" with Tom W. Blackburn, the title song from the 1956 Humphrey the Bear cartoon In the Bag, and the song "Love" with Floyd Huddleston from Robin Hood.

During his tenure with Disney Studios, Bruns continued to play dixieland jazz, leading his Wonderland Jazz Band on two recording sessions, and playing and recording occasionally with the Disney "house" band, the Firehouse Five Plus Two.

=== Retirement and later years ===
Bruns retired from Disney in 1976 and left California, returning to his native Sandy, Oregon. He instructed music part-time at Lewis & Clark College and continued to perform and compose, including recording at least one locally distributed album of jazz.

== Death ==
Bruns died of a heart attack on May 23, 1983, in Portland, Oregon. He had also suffered from diabetes in his later life. He was survived by his wife, Dorothy Colclough, and their six children. Bruns was cremated, and a service was held at the Chapel of the Hills in Wemme, Oregon. He was interred at Fir Hill Cemetery in Clackamas County. Bruns was named a Disney Legend in 2001.

== Selected film scores ==
All films produced by Walt Disney Productions except where noted.

Year	Title	Director(s)
1955	Davy Crockett, King of the Wild Frontier	Norman Foster
1956	Davy Crockett and the River Pirates	Norman Foster
1957	Zorro	Norman Foster (director)
1957	Johnny Tremain	Robert Stevenson
1959	Sleeping Beauty	Clyde Geronimi (Supervising Director); Eric Larson; Wolfgang Reitherman; Les Clark (Sequence Directors)
1961	One Hundred and One Dalmatians	Wolfgang Reitherman; Hamilton Luske; Clyde Geronimi
1961	The Absent-Minded Professor	Robert Stevenson
1961	Babes in Toyland	Jack Donohue
1963	Son of Flubber	Robert Stevenson
1963	The Sword in the Stone	Wolfgang Reitherman
1966	The Ugly Dachshund	Norman Tokar
1966	The Fighting Prince of Donegal	Michael O'Herlihy
1966	Follow Me, Boys!	Norman Tokar
1967	Island of the Lost^{[P]}	John Florea
1967	The Adventures of Bullwhip Griffin	James Neilson
1967	The Jungle Book	Wolfgang Reitherman
1968	Daring Game^{[P]}	László Benedek
1968	The Horse in the Gray Flannel Suit	Norman Tokar
1968	The Love Bug	Robert Stevenson
1969	My Dog, the Thief	Robert Stevenson
1969	Ride a Northbound Horse	Robert Totten
1970	The Wacky Zoo of Morgan City	Marvin J. Chomsky
1970	The Aristocats	Wolfgang Reitherman
1971	The Strange Monster of Strawberry Cove	Jack Shea
1973	Robin Hood	Wolfgang Reitherman
1974	Herbie Rides Again	Robert Stevenson

^{P} Produced and released by Paramount Pictures

== Accolades ==
Award	Category	Year	Nominated work(s)	Outcome	Ref.
Academy Awards	Best Music, Scoring of a Musical Picture	1959	Sleeping Beauty	Nominated	
Academy Awards	Best Music, Scoring of a Musical Picture	1961	Babes in Toyland	Nominated	
Academy Awards	Best Score – Adaptation or Treatment	1963	The Sword in the Stone	Nominated	
Academy Awards	Best Original Song	1973	"Love" (with Floyd Huddleston) (from Robin Hood)	Nominated	
Grammy Awards	Best Sound Track Album or Recording	1959	Sleeping Beauty	Nominated	
Grammy Awards	Best Recording for Children	1962	One Hundred and One Dalmatians	Nominated	
Grammy Awards	Best Recording for Children	1975	Robin Hood	Nominated	
