= Ye Olden Days =

1933 film by Burt Gillett

- Directed by: Burt Gillett
- Produced by: Walt Disney
- Starring: Marcellite Garner; Pinto Colvig; Walt Disney; Allan Watson
- Music by: Frank Churchill
- Color process: Black and white
- Production company: Walt Disney Productions
- Distributed by: United Artists
- Release date: April 8, 1933
- Running time: 8 minutes
- Country: United States
- Language: English

Ye Olden Days is a 1933 animated short film directed by Burt Gillett. It is the 55th film of the Mickey Mouse film series.

== Plot ==
Set in Europe, during the Middle Ages, Mickey Mouse, the wandering minstrel, rides on his donkey whilst strumming on his lute, singing his own song. He then arrives at a castle and witnesses the king of "Kalapazoo" declare that his daughter, Princess Minnie, shall marry the prince of "Poopapadoo" (Dippy Dawg/Goofy). However, Minnie does not love the prince at all and slaps him in the face three times in rejection. Angered at his daughter's rebellion, the king ordered his knights to "Lock her in the attic!", and so Minnie and her servant, Clarabelle Cow, are both taken away. Concerned for the princess, Mickey then climbs a tree near the "attic", which is another castle tower.

As they are both locked in, Minnie immediately bursts into tears along with Clarabelle sobbing that there's no hope left. However, Mickey sings to Minnie that he'll save her, with Minnie throwing a flower in approval of her savior. Mickey gets to the window of her cell via a catapulted bird's nest, but realizes that there isn't a rope to climb down from the window. While the king indulges himself on the wedding feast, Mickey grabs hold of his newfound love, and glides down the rope of clothes made from Clarabelle, who is now nude in a barrel. The two lovebirds are halfway down, but the king spots them and has them arrested. He then orders Mickey to be executed by guillotine.

Minnie begs her father to spare Mickey's life, declaring that she loves him. Seeing that she truly has feelings for the young minstrel, as well as an opportunity for some entertainment, the king grants Mickey a chance to prove his worth for his daughter's hand by having a duel with the prince, exciting everyone. Mickey prepares himself by wearing a stove and helmet as armor and riding atop his donkey, while the prince uses actual armor and horse. The prince and Mickey are both catapulted off their steeds and into the wall. The prince then grabs a spear and chases after Mickey, but the mouse avoids it and chops it with a small guillotine. Then Mickey grabs the spear and starts to poke the prince as the king and princess cheer on. Mickey's donkey and the prince's horse also fight each other, but the donkey bites the horse's bottom, making him whinny and bump into a wall where the king's picture falls onto him, knocking out the horse. The minstrel wins the duel as the prince jumps out of the window. Then the princess kisses the king and goes off after the minstrel. They both ride on the donkey as the crowd carries them outside. The short ends with Mickey and Minnie kissing behind a fan.

== Reception ==
On April 17, 1933, The Film Daily said: "As good as they have been right along, these Walt Disney animated cartoons keep getting better. The present one, in which Mickey as a roving troubadour rescues Princess Minnie from an unhappy marriage and gets her for himself, reflects the infinite attention to detail that is characteristic of the Disney workshops. Basic idea, animation and sound synchronization including semi-vocalized dialogue, all are in a class by themselves. This lively number will fit any bill".

== Home media ==
The short was released on December 2, 2002, on Walt Disney Treasures: Mickey Mouse in Black and White. Two years earlier, a colorized version appeared on the Walt Disney Gold Classic Collection VHS and DVD of Disney's 21st animated feature, Robin Hood. The original version of the cartoon appears on the 2013 Blu-ray of Robin Hood.

== See also ==
- Mickey Mouse (film series)
