= Kim Esty =

Canadian Eurodance musician

- Genres: Eurodance
- Occupation(s): Singer, producer
- Years active: 1988–present
- Labels: Power Records, Quality Records

Kim Esty is a Canadian Eurodance musician. She is best known for her 1993 song, "Summer in the Street" which reached number 5 on the Canadian RPM Dance chart. She is also known for collaborating with The Boomtang Boys on two singles, the top 10 hit, "Squeeze Toy" and the top 30 hit, "Pictures".

== Discography ==
=== Albums ===
Year	Album Details	Chart Positions
Year	Album Details	CAN
2003	Variety Show: Release date: 2003; Label: Squeezetoy Studios	—

=== Singles ===
Year	Title	Chart Positions
Year	Title	CAN Dance
1988	"Your Love Feels Like Dynamite"	—
1989	"Make You Mine"	—
1993	"Summer in the Street"	5
1993	"Funky Little Beat"	—
1994	"Two of Hearts"	—
1995	"I Dream of Happiness"	—

==== Guest singles with The Boomtang Boys ====
Year	Song	Chart peak		Album
Year	Song	CAN	CAN Dance	Album
1999	"Squeeze Toy"	10	5	Greatest Hits Volume One
1999	"Pictures"	23	—	Greatest Hits Volume One
"—" denotes a release that did not chart.

== Awards and nominations ==
Year	Association	Category	Result
2000	MuchMusic Video Awards	Best Dance Video – "Squeeze Toy" (with The Boomtang Boys)	Won
