= Classic Disney: 60 Years of Musical Magic =

- The cover of the 2003 box set containing all 5 Classic Disney CDs.

Box set by Various Artists
- Released: 1995 – 1998 (Volumes I - V individually); 2000 (Volumes I - III box set); 2001 (Volumes I - IV box set); 2003 (Volumes I - V box set)
- Recorded: 1929 – 1998
- Genre: Soundtrack
- Length: 72:04 (Volume I); 72:46 (Volume II); 73:02 (Volume III); 63:08 (Volume IV); 69:13 (Volume V); 5:50:14 Total
- Label: Walt Disney Records
- Producer: Harold J. Kleiner, Ted Kryczko

Classic Disney: 60 Years of Musical Magic is a five-volume compilation series, each containing 25 (125 in total) songs compiled from Disneyland and Walt Disney World, various Disney films in animation and live-action, and the Walt Disney anthology television series. Each volume was released individually on CD and cassette between 1995 and 1998. Volume I was released on March 28, 1995, Volume II on September 12, 1995, Volume III on July 2, 1996, Volume IV on July 15, 1997 and Volume V on September 22, 1998. In 2000, a box set was released containing volumes 1 - 3, followed by a box set containing volumes 1 - 4 in 2001, Finally, a box set containing all five volumes packaged in a slipcase was released by Walt Disney Records in Australia, Japan, North America and Europe in 2003.

The series was followed by Disney's Greatest, a three-volume compilation series released in 2001 and 2002. The series was very similar to Classic Disney and although each volume featured many of the same songs, only 20 songs appeared on each volume as opposed to Classic Disney's 25. In addition to containing only 20 songs, the Disney's Greatest compilations also contained songs from films released from 1999 - 2002, after the Classic Disney compilations were released.

== Track listing ==
=== Volume I - Maroon ===
1. "A Whole New World" (Aladdin)
2. "Circle of Life" (The Lion King)
3. "Beauty and the Beast" (Beauty and the Beast)
4. "Under the Sea" (The Little Mermaid)
5. "Hakuna Matata" (The Lion King)
6. "Kiss the Girl" (The Little Mermaid)
7. "I Just Can't Wait to Be King" (The Lion King)
8. "Poor Unfortunate Souls" (The Little Mermaid)
9. "Chim Chim Cher-ee" (Mary Poppins)
10. "Jolly Holiday" (Mary Poppins)
11. "A Spoonful of Sugar" (Mary Poppins)
12. "Let's Get Together" (The Parent Trap)
13. "The Monkey's Uncle" (The Monkey's Uncle)
14. "The Ugly Bug Ball" (Summer Magic)
15. "The Spectrum Song" (An Adventure in Color)
16. "Colonel Hathi's March" (The Jungle Book)
17. "A Whale of a Tale" (20,000 Leagues Under the Sea)
18. "You Can Fly" (Peter Pan)
19. "The Work Song" (Cinderella)
20. "A Dream Is a Wish Your Heart Makes" (Cinderella)
21. "Zip-a-Dee-Doo-Dah" (Song of the South)
22. "Dance of the Reed Flutes" (Fantasia)
23. "Love Is a Song" (Bambi)
24. "Someday My Prince Will Come" (Snow White and the Seven Dwarfs)
25. "Minnie's Yoo Hoo" (Mickey's Follies)

=== Volume II - Blue ===
1. "Be Our Guest" (Beauty and the Beast)
2. "Can You Feel the Love Tonight" (The Lion King)
3. "Part of Your World" (The Little Mermaid)
4. "One Jump Ahead" (Aladdin)
5. "Gaston" (Beauty and the Beast)
6. "Something There" (Beauty and the Beast)
7. "Supercalifragilisticexpialidocious" (Mary Poppins)
8. "Candle on the Water" (Pete's Dragon)
9. "Main Street Electrical Parade" (Main Street Electrical Parade)
10. "The Age of Not Believing" (Bedknobs and Broomsticks)
11. "The Bare Necessities" (The Jungle Book)
12. "Feed the Birds" (Mary Poppins)
13. "Best of Friends" (The Fox and the Hound)
14. "Let's Go Fly a Kite" (Mary Poppins)
15. "It's a Small World" (1964 New York World's Fair)
16. "The Tiki, Tiki, Tiki Room" (Walt Disney's Enchanted Tiki Room)
17. "Mickey Mouse March" (The Mickey Mouse Club)
18. "On the Front Porch" (Summer Magic)
19. "The Second Star to the Right" (Peter Pan)
20. "Ev'rybody Got a Laughing Place" (Song of the South)
21. "Bibbidi-Bobbidi-Boo" (Cinderella)
22. "So This Is Love" (Cinderella)
23. "When You Wish Upon a Star" (Pinocchio)
24. "Heigh-Ho" (Snow White and the Seven Dwarfs)
25. "Who's Afraid of the Big Bad Wolf" (Three Little Pigs)

=== Volume III - Green ===
1. "Colors of the Wind" (Pocahontas)
2. "You've Got a Friend in Me" (Toy Story)
3. "Be Prepared" (The Lion King)
4. "Out There" (The Hunchback of Notre Dame)
5. "Family" (James and the Giant Peach)
6. "Les Poissons" (The Little Mermaid)
7. "Mine, Mine, Mine" (Pocahontas)
8. "Jack's Lament" (The Nightmare Before Christmas)
9. "My Name Is James" (James and the Giant Peach)
10. "Heffalumps and Woozles" (Winnie the Pooh and the Blustery Day)
11. "The Mob Song" (Beauty and the Beast)
12. "Portobello Road" (Bedknobs and Broomsticks)
13. "Stay Awake" (Mary Poppins)
14. "I Wan'na Be Like You" (The Jungle Book)
15. "Oo-De-Lally" (Robin Hood)
16. "Are We Dancing" (The Happiest Millionaire)
17. "Once Upon a Dream" (Sleeping Beauty)
18. "Bella Notte" (Lady and the Tramp)
19. "Following the Leader" (Peter Pan)
20. "Trust in Me" (The Jungle Book)
21. "The Ballad of Davy Crockett" (Davy Crockett)
22. "I'm Professor Ludwig von Drake" (An Adventure in Color)
23. "Pink Elephants on Parade" (Dumbo)
24. "Little April Shower" (Bambi)
25. "The Silly Song" (Snow White and the Seven Dwarfs)

=== Volume IV - Purple ===
1. "One Last Hope" (Hercules)
2. "A Guy Like You" (The Hunchback of Notre Dame)
3. "On the Open Road" (A Goofy Movie)
4. "Just Around the Riverbend" (Pocahontas)
5. "Home" (Beauty and the Beast: The Musical)
6. "Fantasmic!" (Fantasmic!)
7. "Oogie Boogie's Song" (The Nightmare Before Christmas)
8. "I Will Go Sailing No More" (Toy Story)
9. "Substitutiary Locomotion" (Bedknobs and Broomsticks)
10. "Stop, Look and Listen/I'm No Fool" (The Mickey Mouse Club)
11. "Love" (Robin Hood)
12. "Thomas O'Malley Cat" (The Aristocats)
13. "That's What Friends Are For" (The Jungle Book)
14. "Winnie the Pooh" (Winnie the Pooh and the Honey Tree)
15. "Femininity" (Summer Magic)
16. "Ten Feet off the Ground" (The One and Only, Genuine, Original Family Band)
17. "The Siamese Cat Song" (Lady and the Tramp)
18. "Enjoy It!" (In Search of the Castaways)
19. "Although I Dropped $100,000 in the Market" (A Symposium on Popular Songs)
20. "Give a Little Whistle" (Pinocchio)
21. "Oh, Sing Sweet Nightingale" (Cinderella)
22. "I Wonder" (Sleeping Beauty)
23. "Looking for Romance (I Bring You a Song)" (Bambi)
24. "Baby Mine" (Dumbo)
25. "I'm Wishing/One Song" (Snow White and the Seven Dwarfs)

=== Volume V - Orange ===
1. "I'll Make a Man Out of You" (Mulan)
2. "I Won't Say (I'm in Love)" (Hercules)
3. "God Help the Outcasts" (The Hunchback of Notre Dame)
4. "If I Can't Love Her" (Beauty and the Beast: The Musical)
5. "Steady as the Beating Drum" (Pocahontas)
6. "Belle" (Beauty and the Beast)
7. "Strange Things" (Toy Story)
8. "Cruella De Vil" -- performed by Dr. John. (101 Dalmatians)
9. "Eating the Peach" (James and the Giant Peach)
10. "Seize the Day" (Newsies)
11. "What's This?" (The Nightmare Before Christmas)
12. "Lavender Blue" (So Dear to My Heart)
13. "The Rain, Rain, Rain Came Down, Down, Down" (Winnie the Pooh and the Blustery Day)
14. "A Step in the Right Direction" (Bedknobs and Broomsticks)
15. "Boo Bop Bopbop Bop (I Love You, Too)" (Pete's Dragon)
16. "Yo Ho (A Pirate's Life for Me)" (Pirates of the Caribbean)
17. "My Own Home" (The Jungle Book)
18. "Everybody Wants to Be a Cat" (The Aristocats)
19. "In a World of My Own" (Alice in Wonderland)
20. "You Belong to My Heart" (The Three Caballeros)
21. "Humphrey Hop" (In the Bag)
22. "He's a Tramp" (Lady and the Tramp)
23. "Song of the South" (Song of the South)
24. "When I See an Elephant Fly" (Dumbo)
25. "I've Got No Strings" (Pinocchio)

== Reception ==
The Melbourne Age called the collection "pure joy", saying that "the Disney policy of hiring quality songwriters and the best voicing talent has produced top-drawer popular songs that stand the test of time."

The Palm Beach Post said that "the set covers an amazing bit of ground," and gave "credit to the producers for including some harder-to-find material."

== See also ==
- The Disney Collection: The Best-Loved Songs from Disney Motion Pictures, Television, and Theme Parks
