= Carole Shelley =

British actress (1939–2018)

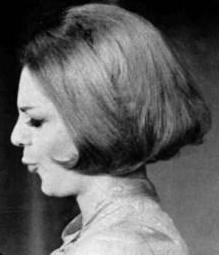
- Shelley as Gwendolyn Pigeon in The Odd Couple, 1965
- Born: Carole Augusta Shelley; 16 August 1939; London, England
- Died: 31 August 2018 (aged 79); Manhattan, New York, U.S.
- Occupation: Actress
- Years active: 1949–2018
- Spouse: Albert G. Woods (m. 1967; died 1971)

Carole Augusta Shelley (16 August 1939 – 31 August 2018) was an English actress who made her career in the United States and United Kingdom. Her many stage roles included originating the roles of Gwendolyn Pigeon in The Odd Couple and Madame Morrible in Wicked. She won the Tony Award for Best Actress in a Play for her performance in The Elephant Man (1979) and received additional nominations for her work on Absurd Person Singular (1975), Stepping Out (1987), and Billy Elliot (2009).

== Early life ==
Shelley was born in London, England, the daughter of Deborah (née Bloomstein), an opera singer of Russian Jewish descent, and Curtis Shelley, a composer of German Jewish origin. Her father had emigrated to London before World War II.

== Career ==
=== Stage career ===
Shelley made her Broadway debut as Gwendolyn Pigeon in the original 1965 production of The Odd Couple (starring Art Carney and Walter Matthau). She reprised the role for the 1968 film version (with Jack Lemmon replacing Carney), and the first season of the subsequent television series (starring Tony Randall and Jack Klugman). She and Monica Evans, who co-starred as her sister Cecily Pigeon, were the only two performers to appear in the original play The Odd Couple and both the film and original television adaptation—and in the same roles.

In the 1970s, Shelley wanted to extend her range, feeling she was not using all her capabilities as an actor. She told The New York Times in a 1979 interview that she had "months of the most intensive deep-water swimming — more than I’d ever been called upon to do in my life" when she played Rosalind in As You Like It at the 1972 Stratford Festival in Ontario. She received her first Tony Award nomination in 1975 for her performance as "Jane" in Absurd Person Singular. Shelley won the 1979 Tony Award for Best Actress in a Play for her role as Mrs. Kendal in The Elephant Man, and was nominated for the Tony Award as Featured Actress in a Play in 1987 for her performance in Stepping Out as "Maxine". In 1982 she won an Obie Award for her performance Twelve Dreams. Shelley also began appearing in musicals in the late 1990s, with the revivals of Show Boat as Parthy and Cabaret as Fraulein Schneider in 1999.

In 2003, Shelley debuted the role of Madame Morrible in the original Broadway cast of Wicked, a role which she later reprised in the show's first national touring company in 2005, in the 2006 Chicago production, and in a return Broadway engagement in 2007.

Shelley played the role of Grandma in the Broadway production of Billy Elliot at the Imperial Theatre, beginning performances in October 2008. She was nominated for a Tony Award for Best Featured Actress in a Musical in 2009. In 2014, she succeeded Jane Carr as Miss Shingle in A Gentleman's Guide to Love and Murder, which would mark her final Broadway appearance.

=== Film and television career ===
Shelley's early career included roles in British films such as It's Great to Be Young (1956), Carry On Regardless (1961), No My Darling Daughter (1961), The Cool Mikado (1962) and Carry On Cabby (1963). In 1968 Shelley starred as Gwendolyn Pigeon in the film The Odd Couple. Thereafter she took on numerous roles in television and films such as The Boston Strangler (1968), Some Kind of a Nut (1969), The Whoopee Boys (1986), Little Noises (1992), The Road to Wellville (1994), and she played Helen Moskowitz in the Emmy-winning 1998 Frasier episode "Merry Christmas, Mrs. Moskowitz".

She was featured as "Aunt Clara" alongside Nicole Kidman and former Wicked co-star Kristin Chenoweth in the 2005 film Bewitched. She lent her voice to several roles in Disney animated films; notably, Amelia Gabble (the Goose) in The Aristocats (1970), Lady Kluck, Maid Marian's sidekick and lady-in-waiting, in Robin Hood (1973), and Lachesis the Fate in Hercules. Shelley's "sister" co-star in all three versions of The Odd Couple, Monica Evans, also played her "goose" sister in The Aristocats, Abigail Gabble, and Maid Marian in Robin Hood as a nod to their roles as Pigeon Sisters.

Her final role was a cameo at the beginning of John Mulaney’s 2018 comedy special Kid Gorgeous; she played Mulaney’s guide around Radio City Music Hall.

== Personal life ==
In 1967, she was married to Albert G. Woods, who died in 1971.

=== Death ===
Shelley died of cancer on 31 August 2018, at the age of 79 in Manhattan, New York.

== Filmography ==
=== Film ===
Year	Title	Role	Notes
1949	Give Us This Day	Bit part	Uncredited
1949	The Cure for Love	Lila Draper	
1956	It's Great to Be Young	Peggy, The Angel Hill Kids	
1961	Carry On Regardless	Helen Delling	
1961	No, My Darling Daughter	First Typist	
1963	The Cool Mikado	Mrs. Smith	
1963	Carry On Cabby	Dumb Driver	
1968	The Odd Couple	Gwendolyn	
1968	The Boston Strangler	Dana Banks	
1969	Some Kind of a Nut	Rita	
1970	The Aristocats	Amelia Gabble, the goose	Voice
1973	Robin Hood	Lady Kluck, the chicken	Voice
1986	The Whoopee Boys	Henrietta Phelps	
1991	Little Noises	Aunt Shirley	
1991	The Super	Irene Kritski	
1994	Quiz Show	Cornwall Aunt	
1994	The Road to Wellville	Mrs. Hookstratten	
1997	Jungle 2 Jungle	Fiona	
1997	Hercules	Lachesis	Voice
2000	Labor Pains	Madge	
2005	Bewitched	Aunt Clara	
2018	John Mulaney: Kid Gorgeous at Radio City	Mystery Chaperone	final credit

=== Television ===
Year	Title	Role	Notes
1961–1962	BBC Sunday-Night Play	Betty Hobson	Episodes: "A Fair Cop" and "A Clear Chase"
1963	The Dickie Henderson Show	Elsie Partridge	Episode: "The Maid"
1963	Laughter from the Whitehall	Bernice Warren	Episode: "High Temperature"
1985–1987	The Berenstain Bears	Additional Female Voices (voice)	12 episodes
1991-1994	One Life to Live	Babs Bartlett	Unknown episodes
1998	Hercules	Lachesis (voice)	3 episodes Credited as Carole Schelley
1998	Frasier	Helen Moskowitz	Episode: "Merry Christmas, Mrs. Moskowitz"
2000	Law & Order: Special Victims Unit	Judge Pamela Mizener	Episode: "Nocturne"
2002	Third Watch	Sister Rose	Episode: "Cold Front"
2004	Scooter: Get a Clue!	Aunt Eugenia (voice)	Episode: "Here Comes the Shocker"

=== Stage ===
Year	Title	Role	Notes
1965	The Odd Couple	Gwendolyn Pigeon	Plymouth Theatre, Broadway
1967	The Astrakhan Coat	Barbara	Helen Hayes Theatre, Broadway
1967	The White Lies	Sophie/Baroness Lemberg	Ethel Barrymore Theatre, Broadway
1967	Black Comedy	Clea (Standby)	Ethel Barrymore Theatre, Broadway
1968	Loot	Fay	Blitmore Theatre, Broadway
1968	Noel Coward's Sweet Potato	Eve	Ethel Barrymore Theatre, Broadway
1970	Hay Fever	Jackie Coryton	Helen Hayes Theatre, Broadway
1972	As You Like It	Rosalind	Stratford Festival, Ontario
1974	Absurd Person Singular	Jane	Music Box Theatre, Broadway
1975	The Norman Conquests	Ruth	Morosco Theatre, Broaday
1979	The Elephant Man	Mrs. Kendal/Pinhead	Booth Theatre, Broadway
1981	Double Feature	Margaret	Theater at St. Peter's Church, Off-Broadway
1982	Twelve Dreams	Dorothy Trowbridge	The Public Theater, Off-Broadway
1983	The Misanthrope	Arsinoe	Circle in the Square Theatre, Broadway
1983	Noises Off	Dotty Otley (Replacement)	Brooks Atkinson Theater, Broadway
1986	Jubilee	Eva	New Amsterdam Theater Company, Off-Broadway
1987	Stepping Out	Maxine	John Golden Theatre, Broadway
1990	The Miser	Frosine	Circle in the Square Theatre, Broadway
1994	Show Boat	Parthy Ann Hawks (Replacement)	Gershwin Theatre, Broadway
1994	Lady in the Dark	Performer	New York City Center, Off-Broadway
1997	The Last Night of Ballyhoo	Boo Levy (Replacement)	Helen Hayes Theatre, Broadway
1999	Cabaret	Fraulein Schneider (Replacement)	Roundabout Theatre, Broadway
2003	Wicked	Madame Morrible	Gershwin Theatre, Broadway
2008	Billy Elliiot the Musical	Grandma	Imperial Theatre, Broadway
2014	A Gentleman's Guide to Love and Murder	Miss Shingle (Replacement)	Walter Kerr Theatre, Broadway
2016	My Fair Lady	Mrs. Higgins	Bay Street Theatre, Off-Broadway
