= Monica Evans =

British actress (born 1940)

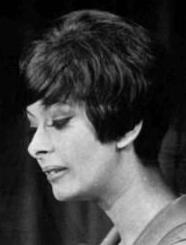
- Evans as Cecily Pigeon in the Broadway production of The Odd Couple, 1965
- Born: 7 June 1940 (age 86); Camberwell, London, England
- Education: Central School of Speech and Drama
- Occupations: Actress, comedian
- Years active: 1960–1973
- Spouses: Leo Maguire (m. 1962, divorced); Dave Cash (m. 1973; div. 2010)

Monica Evans (born 7 June 1940) is an English retired actress and comedian known for her portrayal of Cecily Pigeon in Neil Simon's The Odd Couple. She was in the original Broadway cast for its entire run, then appeared in the 1968 film version, and finally appeared in some episodes of the first season of the television series based on the play, all in the same role, alongside Carole Shelley as her sister Gwendolyn Pigeon. She also provided voices for the two animated films for Walt Disney Productions, such as The Aristocats (1970), as Abigail Gabble (the Goose) (alongside Shelley as Amelia Gabble) and Robin Hood (1973) as Maid Marian, a vixen (again alongside Shelley as her handmaiden, Lady Kluck, a chicken).

Evans trained at the Central School of Speech & Drama in the 1950s and was the stand-in for Joan Plowright in Rhinoceros. She took over the role from Plowright when Plowright's's relationship with Laurence Olivier became public. She was also one of the stars in a soap opera for BBC Television called Compact, set in the office of a magazine, and starred in The Severed Head in the West End. Evans was the maid of honor at Carole Shelley's wedding in 1967.

She lived in the United States for several years. After her return to the UK, she was married to BBC Radio 1 DJ Dave Cash from 1973 to 2010.

In 2018, she was at the 2018 TCM Classic Film Festival, reuniting with her old friend, Carole Shelley.

As of April 2025, she is the last surviving adult cast member of Robin Hood, alongside the four child actors (Billy Whitaker, Dana Laurita, Dori Whitaker, and Richie Sanders).

As of May 2025, she, Dean Clark, and Roddy Maude-Roxby are the last surviving cast members of The Aristocats.

== TV and filmography ==
Year	Title	Role	Notes
1960	Make Mine Mink	2nd Shop Assistant	Uncredited
1961	You Can't Win	Iris	TV series
1961	The Escape of R.D.7	David's Secretary	TV series
1962–1963	Compact	Sally Henderson / Harmon	TV series
1964	No Hiding Place	Elaine Holmes	TV series
1965	Be My Guest	Dyllis	
1968	The Odd Couple	Cecily	
1970–1971	The Odd Couple	Cecily	TV series
1970	Here Come the Brides	Renee	TV series
1970	The Aristocats	Abigail Gabble, the Goose	Voice
1973	Robin Hood	Maid Marian, the Vixen	Voice; final film role
