= Julius Svendsen =

Norwegian animator (1919–1971)

- Born: Julius Fredrik Svendsen; January 3, 1919; Kristiansand, Norway
- Died: August 26, 1971 (aged 52); San Joaquin River, California, United States
- Occupations: Animator; storyboard artist; comic book illustrator
- Years active: 1940–1971
- Spouse: Carol Joyner (m. 1949)
- Children: 4

Julius Svendsen (January 3, 1919 – August 26, 1971) was a Norwegian-born animator, storyboard artist, and comic book illustrator for Walt Disney Productions.

== Biography ==
Svendsen was born in 1919 to Frederick J. Svendsen and Mary Svendsen. When he was four, his family immigrated to the United States where they resided in Brooklyn, New York City. Svendsen attended Manual Training High School. After graduating from high school, he attended the Pratt Institute of Arts on a full scholarship from the New York Society of Illustrators.

Svendsen was hired by Walt Disney Productions in the Training Department on February 19, 1940. He soon became an inbetweener for Fantasia (1940) on August 26. He was promoted to assistant animator on Dumbo (1941). On January 27, 1942, Svendsen left Disney to join the United States Army Signal Corps, concentrating most of his tour above the Arctic Circle. He was discharged and returned to Disney on November 5, 1945. He was then promoted to character animator working on Cinderella (1950), Alice in Wonderland (1951), and Peter Pan (1953). Afterwards, Svendsen worked as an animator on the UPA-inspired short films, Melody (1953) and Toot, Whistle, Plunk and Boom (1953), which were directed by Ward Kimball. In their 1981 book Disney Animation: The Illusion of Life, Frank Thomas and Ollie Johnston noted that Svendsen and Art Stevens were known as being adept for their stylized animation.

For the Disneyland television series, Walt Disney asked Kimball to develop an episode centered on atomic energy, assigning Svendsen to work on the project. Svendsen and Kimball did initial story development on the project; however, by April 1954, they had shifted away from focusing on atomic energy and instead on space travel. The resulting project became the episode "Man in Space" (1955) for which Svendsen did animation for the space medicine segment.

In 1958, Svendsen also illustrated several Disney comic strips, including The Seven Dwarfs and the Witch-Queen and Sleeping Beauty that appeared in Sunday editions of American syndicated newspapers. Both strips were written by Floyd Gottfredson. Concurrently, he also illustrated the comic strip Mickey Mouse and His Friends with Roy Williams handling the writing from 1958 to 1962.

He returned to character animation for One Hundred and One Dalmatians (1961), The Saga of Windwagon Smith (1962), Scrooge McDuck and Money (1967), The Aristocats (1970), and Bedknobs and Broomsticks (1971). He also storyboarded sequences on Winnie the Pooh and the Blustery Day (1968), The Aristocats, and Robin Hood (1973). A children's book titled Hulda was published posthumously in 1974, with the text written by his wife Carol and the illustration done by Julius.

== Personal life ==
Svendsen married Carol Joyner on December 17, 1949. They had two sons and two daughters, one of whom named Julie later worked for Walt Disney Imagineering.

On August 26, 1971, Svendsen died from drowning in the San Joaquin River, at the age of 52. He had fallen from a rented houseboat while attempting to tie it to a tree and hit his head on a rock.

== Filmography ==
Year	Title	Credits	Notes
1940	Fantasia	Inbetweener	Uncredited
1941	Dumbo	Assistant animator	Uncredited
1950	Cinderella	Character animator	Uncredited
1951	Alice in Wonderland	Character animator	Uncredited
1953	Peter Pan	Character animator	Uncredited
1953	Melody (Short)	Animator	
1953	Toot, Whistle, Plunk and Boom (Short)	Animator	
1955–1968	Disneyland	Animator	14 episodes
1958	Grand Canyonscope (Short)	Animator	
1960	Goliath II (Short)	Character animator	Uncredited
1961	One Hundred and One Dalmatians	Character animator	
1962	The Saga of Windwagon Smith (Short)	Character animator	
1962	A Symposium on Popular Songs (Short)	Character animator	
1963	The Sword in the Stone	Character animator	Uncredited
1964	Mary Poppins	Animator	Uncredited
1967	Scrooge McDuck and Money (Short)	Character animator	
1967	The Jungle Book	Character animator	Uncredited
1968	Winnie the Pooh and the Blustery Day (Short)	Story	
1970	The Aristocats	Story / Character animator	
1971	Bedknobs and Broomsticks	Animator	Released posthumously
1973	Robin Hood	Story sequences by	Released posthumously
1977	The Many Adventures of Winnie the Pooh	Story	Posthumous credit Story – "Winnie the Pooh and the Blustery Day"
