= Hampster Dance =

1997 Internet meme

Screen capture of the original web page.

The Hampster Dance is one of the earliest Internet memes. Created in 1997 by Canadian art student Deidre LaCarte as a GeoCities page, the page features rows of animated GIFs of hamsters and other rodents dancing in various ways to a sped-up sample from the song "Whistle-Stop", written and performed by Roger Miller for the 1973 Walt Disney Productions film Robin Hood. In 2005, CNET named the Hampster Dance the number-one Web fad.

== Background ==
Canadian martial arts instructor and Malaspina University-College student Deidre LaCarte (of Nanaimo, British Columbia) was in a competition with her best friend and sister to generate the most Web traffic when she created the Hampster Dance page with the free GeoCities web service in August 1997. She named the site "Hampton Hampster's Hamster House" in homage to her pet hamster, "Hampton Hampster", who on the page declared his intent to become a "Web star." LaCarte noted that the misspelling of "hamster" as "hampster" in both her pet's name and the Hampster Dance page was intentional.

The Hampster Dance site originally consisted of a single page with just four unique animated GIFs of cartoon hamsters. These images were repeated in rows by the dozens and were paired with an infectious, continuously looping background tune. At the time the page was created, embedding background music in HTML pages was a fairly novel browser feature. The clip, a nine-second looped WAV file, was a sped-up sample of Roger Miller's "Whistle Stop", a song written for the opening credits of the 1973 Disney animated feature film Robin Hood.

From its creation in August 1997 to March 1999, the Hampster Dance site only recorded about 800 total visits (roughly four per day). In February 1999, word of the website spread by e-mail and early blogs. By March, the site gathered approximately 60,000 views in four days. By December, LaCarte had created an online store selling themed items. Fans of the site created variations on the original theme, using images of other animals and of politicians such as Dan Quayle. In January 2000, the site was featured in a television commercial for Internet service provider EarthLink.

The original website was hosted on GeoCities, and LaCarte failed to register the hampsterdance.com domain. With the continued popularity of the original site, an unauthorized duplicate website was hosted on hampsterdance.com. LaCarte thus used the domains hamsterdance.com, hamsterdance2.com, and hampsterdance2.com. In early 2000, the domain was transferred to humor business Nutty Sites for undisclosed reasons. In late 2001, LaCarte sold the "Hampster Dance" rights to Abatis International, who managed to acquire the original domain. The site later expanded, revealing the names of all four characters (Hampton, Dixie, Hado, and Fuzzy) and offering themed versions for birthdays, graduation, holidays, etc. The original website is no longer functional, but other sites inspired by the original still exist.

== Music releases and Hampton and the Hampsters ==
In April 1999, hoping to capitalize on the popularity of the website, English electronic group the Cuban Boys promotionally released "Cognoscenti vs. Intelligentsia". In its original release, the track featured the sped-up sample of "Whistle Stop". When the song was commercially released later that December, it was replaced with a soundalike sample. The song was marketed as "the Hamster Dance song", and LaCarte accused the group of stealing her idea. The single peaked at number 4 on the Christmas 1999 UK singles chart.

In June 2000, LaCarte partnered with producers The Boomtang Boys for the release of a site-sponsored song, "The Hampsterdance Song". Like the previous single by the Cuban Boys, the single contains a different sound-alike sample of "Whistle Stop". Disney did not allow the use of the actual "Whistle Stop" clip, and liner notes for the single state: "Includes elements of 'Whistle Stop' by Roger Miller." A cartoon video was produced for the single that introduced a cartoon "band" of four hamsters which included Hampton alongside Fuzzy, Hado, and Dixie. Though the song was solely credited to "Hampton the Hampster", the band was later dubbed "Hampton and the Hampsters." The song reached number one on the Canadian Singles Chart while peaking at number 32 on the RPM charts. In Australia, "The Hampsterdance Song" was released in 2001 and reached number five on the ARIA Singles Chart. The song proved to be very successful on Radio Disney, where it became the station's all-time most played song and was later included on the compilation album Radio Disney Ultimate Jams. LaCarte's online store was expanded and began offering T-shirts and CDs of the fictional group's music. A Flash-animated series was planned by Nelvana, but never made it past the planning process.

Following the relative success of "The Hampsterdance Song" single, an entire album titled Hampsterdance: The Album was released in October 2000. Some follow-up singles from this album were moderately successful in Australia, such as "Thank God I'm a Country Boy" (a cover of the John Denver song, reaching number 12) and "Hampster Party" (reaching number 44). In August 2001, the group released the single "Sing a Simple Song" which was a number one hit on Radio Disney. The song was included on their follow-up album Happy Times Ten (2002). Hampsterdance: The Album was reissued twice with shorter track listings: first as The Hampster Dance Party (2002) followed by Hampsterdance Hits (2004). In 2008, the group released their final album, A Very Hampsterdance Christmas.

=== Direct-to-video film ===
The DVD cover of How The Hampsters Saved Winter.

In December 2004, Abatis International relaunched the Hampsterdance website and announced that a DVD would be released in Spring 2005. The date passed with no release, and the release date was later removed. On April 2, 2009, the website began selling a DVD of the direct-to-video animated film How the Hampsters Saved Winter. The film was produced by Abatis International LLC and animated by Unreal Productions, located in New Jersey. The DVD was purchasable until 2012 and sold 2000 copies.

=== Hampton and the Hampsters discography ===
==== Albums ====
List of albums, with selected details, chart positions and certifications
Title	Album details	Peak chart positions	Certification
Title	Album details	AUS	Certification
Hampsterdance: The Album/The Hampsterdance Album (Note: The same album was released under both names in different territories.)	Released: 2000; Label: Koch Entertainment; Format: CD	7	ARIA: Gold
Happy Times Ten	Released: 2002; Label: Kunduru; Format: CD	—	
A Very Hampsterdance Christmas	Released: 2008; Label: That's It! Records; Format: CD, digital download	—	

==== Reissues ====
List of reissues with selected details
Title	Album details
The Hampster Dance Party	Released: 2002; Label: BMG Special Products; Format: CD, cassette
Hampsterdance Hits	Released: 2004; Label: Koch Entertainment; Format: CD

==== Singles ====
List of singles, with selected chart positions
Title	Year	Peak chart positions				Certification	Album
Title	Year	CAN	AUS	GER	US Dance	Certification	Album
"The Hampsterdance Song"	2000	1	5	60	4	ARIA: Gold	Hampsterdance: The Album
"Thank God I'm a Country Boy"	2001	—	12	—	—		Hampsterdance: The Album
"Hampster Party"	2001	—	44	—	—		Hampsterdance: The Album
"Hampsterdance Christmas" (Note: Double A-side of "Jingle Bells" and "Deck the Halls".)	2001	—	—	—	—		Hampsterdance: The Album
"Sing a Simple Song"	2001	—	—	—	—		Happy Times Ten
"Time to Party"	2006	—	—	—	—		Non-album single
"—" denotes releases that failed to chart or not released in that country.

==== Promotional singles ====
List of singles
Title	Year	Album
"Even Hampsters Fall in Love"	2000	Hampsterdance: The Album
