= Roddy Maude-Roxby =

British actor (b. 1930)

- Born: Roderick A. Maude-Roxby; 2 April 1930 (age 96); London, England, U.K.
- Occupation: Actor
- Years active: 1961–2013
- Spouses: Rosemary Jane Lyle (m. 1960, divorced); Elizabeth Alice Mallorie (m. 2003)
- Children: 2

Roderick A. Maude-Roxby (born 2 April 1930) is a retired British actor. He has appeared in numerous films, such as Walt Disney's The Aristocats, where he voiced the greedy butler Edgar Balthazar (his only voice role), Unconditional Love, and Clint Eastwood's White Hunter Black Heart, playing Thompson.

Born in London in 1930, by the time he was 13 he had written two children's books about the adventures of a frog named Bulgy. By the age of 17 he was living in Melbourne, Australia, where he edited a page for The Age, drawing Bulgy comic strips for kids to colour in at home.

An early innovator at the Royal College of Art (RCA) alongside David Hockney and Peter Blake, he was one of the UK's first performance artists, before it was a recognized art form. At the RCA he edited ARK magazine in 1958 and was president of the college's Theatre Group. He had a joint exhibition with Blake at the Portal Gallery in 1960..

As an actor he played the recurring role of Professor Weaver in Michael Palin and Terry Jones' pre-Monty Python series The Complete and Utter History of Britain, and also made appearances in The Goodies, Rowan and Martin's Laugh-In, Not Only... But Also and The Establishment. In 1992 he starred as imprisoned alien Mercator in the experimental BBC1 Saturday morning children's magazine show Parallel 9.

On the stage he won the Theatre of the Year Award for Best Comic New York in 1968 for his work as a stand-up comedian, and in 2012 appeared in Ibsen's St John's Night at London's Jermyn Street Theatre. He also worked with masks and improvisation for over 40 years and was a co-creator of improvisational games developed at the Royal Court Theatre, and then as "Theatre Machine" with Keith Johnstone.

He lives in south-west London.

== Filmography ==
Year	Title	Role	Notes
1961	Dangerous Afternoon	Pug	
1962	The Wild and the Willing	Man	Uncredited
1965	The Party's Over	Hector	
1966	Doctor in Clover	Tristram	
1970	The Aristocats	Edgar Balthazar, the Butler	Voice
1984	Greystoke: The Legend of Tarzan, Lord of the Apes	Olivestone	
1985	Plenty	Committee Chairman	
1987	Playing Away	Vicar	
1989	How to Get Ahead in Advertising	Dr. Gatty	
1990	White Hunter Black Heart	Thompson, British Partner	
1993	Shadowlands	Arnold Dopliss	
2002	Unconditional Love	Minister	Final role
