= Squeeze Toy (song) =

1999 single by the Boomtang Boys

Single by the Boomtang Boys featuring Kim Esty

from the album Greatest Hits Volume One
- B-side: "Popcorn" (remix); "Mon joujou"
- Released: March 30, 1999
- Genre: Dance; Europop
- Length: 3:38
- Label: Virgin Music Canada
- Songwriters: Rob DeBoer; Tony Grace; Paul Grace
- Producer: The Boomtang Boys

The Boomtang Boys singles chronology
"Popcorn" (1999)	"Squeeze Toy" (1999)	"Pictures" (1999)

Music videos
- "Squeeze Toy" on YouTube; "Mon joujou" on YouTube

"Squeeze Toy" is a song by Canadian music production team the Boomtang Boys featuring vocals from Canadian Eurodance singer Kim Esty. Written by group members Rob DeBoer, Tony Grace, and Paul Grace, it was released in March 1999 as the second single from their first studio album, Greatest Hits Volume One. The song topped the Canadian Singles Chart for four weeks and became a top-10 radio hit, peaking at number 10 on Canada's RPM 100 Hit Tracks chart. A French-language version of the song titled "Mon joujou" (English: "My Toy") was also recorded, featuring vocals from Diane DiVito.

== Release ==
"Squeeze Toy" was released as a maxi-CD single in Canada on March 30, 1999. The CD includes additional mixes of "Squeeze Toy", including the French version, "Mon joujou", plus remixes of the Boomtang Boys' debut single, "Popcorn", and a multimedia element. On April 17, 1999, the single debuted at number one on the Canadian Singles Chart, where it stayed for four weeks and charted for a total of 10 weeks. The song was also popular on Canadian radio, reaching number 10 on the RPM 100 Hit Tracks chart, and in dance clubs, peaking at number five on RPM's Dance chart. The magazine ranked the song as the 77th-most-successful single of 1999 and the 46th-most-successful dance track. It has sold 20,000 copies in Canada according to Nielsen SoundScan. "Squeeze Toy" was also released commercially in Europe and Australasia, while in the United States, it was sent to contemporary hit radio on September 14, 1999.

== Critical reception ==
Virgin Records America co-president Ray Cooper called the track "so damn catchy" while Mike Plen, senior vice president of the label's promotion, said that the song is a "fun dance record" despite the band's lack of pop music credibility. Billboard magazine reviewed the song on their September 11, 1999, issue, referring to the track as an "ultra-cutesy dance ditty" and commenting on its double entendre, saying that it is "naughty in the most genial of ways".

== Music video ==
The music video for "Squeeze Toy" was added to the playlist of Canadian music channel MuchMusic on the week ending March 20, 1999, and to the playlist of American network The Box on the week ending August 15, 1999. The video shows live actors plus animated caricatures of the Boomtang Boys in a bedroom, a bathroom, a classroom, and a dance club. At the 1999 MuchMusic Video Awards, the video won the award for Best Dance Video.

== Track listings ==
Canadian, European, and Australasian maxi-CD single

1. "Squeeze Toy" (featuring Kim Esty) – 3:38
2. "Popcorn" (Like Butta mix) – 3:21
3. "Squeeze Toy" (Free Style mix) – 4:06
4. "Popcorn" (Microwave mix) – 3:39
5. "Mon joujou" (featuring Diane DiVito) – 3:38
6. Multi-media grab bag

European CD single ("Mon joujou")

1. "Mon joujou" (Latin mix featuring Diane DiVito) – 3:21
2. "Squeeze Toy" (Latin mix featuring Kim Esty) – 3:21

== Credits and personnel ==
Credits are lifted from the Canadian maxi-CD single and Greatest Hits Volume One liner notes.

Studio

- Mastered at The Other Studio (Toronto, Ontario, Canada)

Personnel

- The Boomtang Boys – production, mixing
  - Rob DeBoer – writing
  - Tony Grace – writing
  - Paul Grace – writing
- Kim Esty – vocals
- Bro Nick – mastering

== Charts ==
=== Weekly charts ===
Chart (1999)	Peak position
Canada (Nielsen SoundScan)	1
Canada Top Singles (RPM)	10
Canada Dance/Urban (RPM)	5

=== Year-end charts ===
Chart (1999)	Position
Canada Top Singles (RPM)	77
Canada Dance/Urban (RPM)	46

== Sales ==
Region	Certification	Certified units/sales
Canada	—	20,000

== Release history ==
Region	Date	Format(s)	Label(s)	Ref(s).
Canada	March 30, 1999	Maxi-CD	Virgin Music Canada	
United States	September 14, 1999	Contemporary hit radio	Virgin	
