= The Aristocats =

1970 American romantic comedy animated film

- Original theatrical release poster
- Directed by: Wolfgang Reitherman
- Story by: Larry Clemmons; Vance Gerry; Frank Thomas; Julius Svendsen; Ken Anderson; Eric Cleworth; Ralph Wright
- Based on: a story by Tom McGowan; Tom Rowe
- Produced by: Winston Hibler; Wolfgang Reitherman
- Starring: Phil Harris; Eva Gabor; Sterling Holloway; Scatman Crothers; Paul Winchell; Lord Tim Hudson; Thurl Ravenscroft; Vito Scotti; Dean Clark; Liz English; Gary Dubin; Nancy Kulp; Pat Buttram; George Lindsey; Monica Evans; Carole Shelley; Charles Lane; Hermione Baddeley; Roddy Maude-Roxby; Bill Thompson
- Edited by: Tom Acosta
- Music by: George Bruns
- Production company: Walt Disney Productions
- Distributed by: Buena Vista Distribution
- Release dates: December 11, 1970 (premiere); December 24, 1970 (United States)
- Running time: 79 minutes
- Country: United States
- Language: English
- Budget: $4 million
- Box office: $191 million

The Aristocats is a 1970 American animated adventure comedy film produced by Walt Disney Productions and distributed by Buena Vista Distribution. Directed by Wolfgang Reitherman, and based on a story by Tom McGowan and Tom Rowe, it was the final Disney animated film released during studio co-founder Roy O. Disney's tenure before his death on December 20, 1971. Set in Paris, the plot follows a family of aristocratic cats who are set to gain their mistress's fortune, much to the dismay of her butler. Thrown into the countryside, the family is helped by a feral cat as they attempt to return to their mistress's home. The film stars the voices of Phil Harris, Eva Gabor, Hermione Baddeley, Dean Clark, Sterling Holloway, Scatman Crothers, and Roddy Maude-Roxby.

The Aristocats project began as an original script for a two-part live-action episode for Walt Disney's Wonderful World of Color, developed by McGowan, Rowe, and producer Harry Tytle starting in 1962. Following two years of rewrites, Tytle suggested the project would be more suitable for an animated film, which Disney temporarily shelved while The Jungle Book (1967) advanced into production. When The Jungle Book was nearly complete, Walt Disney appointed Ken Anderson to develop preliminary work on The Aristocats, making it the last film project to be personally approved by Walt before his death. Longtime Disney collaborators Robert and Richard Sherman composed multiple songs for the film, though only two made it in the finished product.

The Aristocats was released on December 24, 1970, to generally positive reviews from film critics. It was also a commercial success.

== Plot ==
In 1910, mother cat Duchess and her three kittens, Berlioz, Marie, and Toulouse, live in Paris with retired opera diva Madame Adelaide Bonfamille, and her English butler, Edgar Balthazar. The cats are pampered pets that live a luxurious lifestyle and are very cultured in art and music, like their owner.

While preparing her will with elderly lawyer Georges Hautecourt, Madame declares that her vast fortune will be first left to her cats, then revert to Edgar once they all die. Edgar overhears this through a speaking tube and, after erroneously calculating that he will die before he can claim his inheritance, plots to eliminate the cats. He sedates them by putting sleeping pills in a dish of cream, then drives them on his motorcycle out to the countryside in a basket. There, he is ambushed by two hounds named Napoleon and Lafayette, losing his hat, sidecar, umbrella, shoes, and the basket before escaping. The cats are left stranded in the countryside, while Madame Adelaide, Roquefort the mouse, and Frou-Frou the horse discover their absence.

The next morning, Duchess meets a feral cat named Thomas O'Malley, who offers to guide her and the kittens to Paris. The group briefly hitchhikes in a milk truck before being chased out by the driver. Later, while crossing a railroad trestle, the cats narrowly avoid an oncoming train, and Marie falls into a river. O'Malley immediately dives in and rescues her, and is himself rescued by Amelia and Abigail Gabble, two English geese on holiday. The geese lead the cats to the outskirts of Paris, then depart to reunite with their inebriated Uncle Waldo. Meanwhile, Edgar returns to the countryside to retrieve his possessions (the only evidence that can incriminate him) from Napoleon and Lafayette and, after some difficulty, ultimately succeeds.

Traveling across the rooftops of the city, the cats meet up with O'Malley's friend Scat Cat who performs the song "Ev'rybody Wants to Be a Cat" with several other cat musicians. After the band has departed, O'Malley and Duchess converse on a nearby rooftop while the kittens listen at a windowsill. Duchess' loyalty to Madame prompts her to decline O'Malley's marriage proposal. The next day, Duchess and the kittens return to Madame's mansion. Edgar finds them before Madame does, and places them in a sack, deciding to ship them to Timbuktu.

Roquefort catches up with O'Malley at Duchess' instruction, and O'Malley returns to the mansion, sending Roquefort to find Scat Cat and his gang. Though he struggles to explain the situation to the alley cats, Roquefort successfully brings them to O'Malley's aid. O'Malley, the alley cats, and Frou-Frou fight Edgar, while Roquefort frees Duchess and the kittens. At the end of the fight, Edgar is locked in his own packing-case and sent to Timbuktu.

The Aristocats return to Madame Adelaide, who, unaware of the reason for Edgar's departure, rewrites her will to exclude him. After adopting O'Malley into the family, Adelaide establishes a charity foundation, housing stray cats in the mansion. Scat Cat and his gang are the first to move in, and reprise their song so loudly that the two hound dogs can hear it out in the countryside.

== Voice cast ==
- Phil Harris as J. Thomas O'Malley (full name: Abraham de Lacy Giuseppe Casey Thomas O'Malley) – A feral cat who befriends Duchess and her kittens, becoming a father figure and a step-father to the kittens and falling in love with Duchess. For cultural reasons, the Italian dubbing of the film changes him to Romeo, er mejo der Colosseo ("Romeo, the best [cat] of the Colosseum" in Romanesco dialect), an Italian cat from Rome speaking with a strong Roman accent; the reason for this change is that alley cats were well known for frequenting the Colosseum at the time.
- Eva Gabor as Duchess – Madame Adelaide's refined and elegant Turkish Angora cat and mother of the three kittens, who believes she is forced to choose between loyalty to Madame and her own attachment to Thomas O'Malley at the end of the film. Robie Lester provided the singing voice for Duchess.
- Gary Dubin as Toulouse – The oldest kitten, who idolizes all alley cats, especially O'Malley. He wants to appear tough, but is actually fairly laidback and easygoing. He is also a talented painter, loosely based on French painter Henri de Toulouse-Lautrec.
- Liz English as Marie – The middle kitten and the only girl. She is a dreamer. She comes off as spoiled, often imperious, sassy or snobbish towards her brothers, but does her best to be a "lady" like her mother. She is an accomplished singer. She is named after the queen of France Marie Antoinette.
- Dean Clark as Berlioz – The youngest kitten. He may seem quiet, but is quite mischievous. He is sweet-natured, but easily annoyed and hard to impress, often the first to make a snide remark. He is a talented pianist, named after the French composer Hector Berlioz.
  - On studio soundtrack releases (such as Walt Disney Records: The Legacy Collection), child vocalists Susan Novack, Gregory Novack, and Victor Sweler provided the singing voices for Marie, Toulouse and Berlioz on "Scales and Arpeggios", though the liner notes do not specify which performer voiced which individual kitten.
- Sterling Holloway as Roquefort – A house mouse and a friend of the cats who assists in the expulsion of Edgar.
- Scatman Crothers as Scat Cat – O'Malley's best friend and leader of a gang of jazz-playing alley cats. Scat Cat plays the trumpet.
- Paul Winchell as Shun Gon – A Chinese cat in Scat Cat's gang. He plays both the piano and drums made from pots.
- Lord Tim Hudson as Hit Cat – An English cat in Scat Cat's gang. He plays acoustic guitar.
- Vito Scotti as Peppo – An Italian cat in Scat Cat's gang. He plays the concertina.
- Thurl Ravenscroft as Billy Boss – A Russian cat in Scat Cat's gang. He plays the double bass.
- Nancy Kulp as Frou-Frou – Madame Adelaide's Palomino carriage horse and Roquefort's companion, who subdues Edgar. Ruth Buzzi provided her singing voice.
- Pat Buttram as Napoleon – A bloodhound who attacks Edgar when he intrudes on the farm where he lives. Whenever his cohort Lafayette makes a suggestion, Napoleon insists that he is in charge, then adopts Lafayette's suggestion as his own.
- George Lindsey as Lafayette – A Basset Hound and Napoleon's companion. He sometimes proves smarter than Napoleon but is also more timid.
- Hermione Baddeley as Madame Adelaide Bonfamille – A wealthy former opera singer and the owner of Duchess and her kittens.
- Charles Lane as Georges Hautecourt – Adelaide's eccentric lawyer, who is also her oldest friend. He is extremely lively, despite his advanced age.
- Roddy Maude-Roxby as Edgar Balthazar – Adelaide's greedy but dim-witted butler, who tries to get rid of her cats in order to inherit her fortune.
- Monica Evans as Abigail Gabble – Amelia's twin sister, a goose who befriends the cats.
- Carole Shelley as Amelia Gabble – Abigail's twin sister, a goose who befriends the cats.
- Bill Thompson as Uncle Waldo – The drunken gander uncle of Abigail and Amelia. This was Thompson's final film role.
- Peter Renaday as French Milkman, Le Petit Cafe Cook, and Truck Movers (uncredited)

== Production ==
=== Story development ===
On December 9, 1961, Walt Disney suggested that Harry Tytle and Tom McGowan find some animal stories to adapt as a two-part live-action episode for the Wonderful World of Color television program. By New Year's 1962, McGowan had found several stories including a children's book about a mother cat and her kittens set in New York City. However, Tytle felt that the London setting had added a significant element to One Hundred and One Dalmatians (1961) and suggested setting the story of the cats in Paris. Following a rough storyline, the story became about two servants—a butler and a maid—who were in line to inherit a fortune of an eccentric mistress after the pet cats died and focused on their feeble and foolish attempts to eliminate the felines. Boris Karloff and Françoise Rosay were in mind to portray the butler and the distressed Madame. A subplot centered around a mother cat hiding her kittens to keep them out of danger in a variety of different homes and locales around Paris. During the filming of Escapade in Florence (1962), McGowan brought Tytle the story that had been written by Tom Rowe, an American writer who was living in Paris.

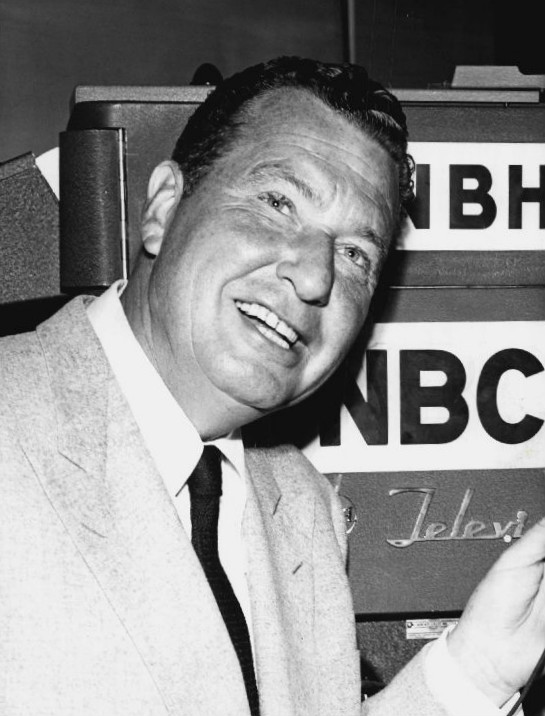
Before his death in 1966, Walt Disney contacted Phil Harris (pictured here) to voice Thomas O'Malley.

By August 1962, they sent the completed story treatment to Burbank, where it was returned as "rejected" by the Disney studios. McGowan, upset at the rejection, suggested selling the treatment elsewhere, but later learned Disney was staying at the Connaught in London. McGowan then slipped the treatment into an envelope for Disney to read at the hotel desk. Disney contacted McGowan, stating he had liked the treatment and would meet with Tytle in Lisbon, Portugal. On August 29, during their flight back to London, Disney told Tytle to purchase the story for a live-action theatrical film, with McGowan as director. Disney also recommended further story revisions, one of which was eliminating one of the kitten characters.

The script revisions were later made in January and February 1963. In June 1963, Rowe had written a letter to Disney addressing his displeasure of the script revisions, in which Tytle responded to Rowe that the changes Disney approved of would be kept. However, the project was temporarily shelved, and in August 1963, Tytle suggested that The Aristocats should be reworked into an animated feature, to which Disney agreed. At Disney's recommendation, Tytle presented the project to Wolfgang Reitherman, who was directing The Jungle Book (1967), who agreed it would work as an animated film. For that reason, Disney temporarily shelved the project as the animation department was occupied with The Jungle Book (1967). In April 1964, story artist Otto Englander was assigned to work on the project. In November 1964, during a story meeting, Disney felt the cats should talk amongst themselves but never in front of the humans, in a similar approach as in One Hundred and One Dalmatians (1961). Because of the production delays, studio producer Bill Anderson advised Tytle to centralize his efforts on live action projects, and he was subsequently replaced by Winston Hibler.

In 1966, Disney assigned Ken Anderson to determine whether The Aristocats would be suitable for an animated feature. With occasional guidance from Reitherman, Anderson worked from scratch and tightened the story. Disney saw the preliminary sketches and approved the project shortly before his death. After The Jungle Book (1967) was completed, the animation department began work on The Aristocats. Reitherman assumed the producing duties, and later tossed out the more emotional story of Duchess's obsession to find human adopters befitting of her kittens' talents. Instead, the film would be retooled as an adventure comedy in the vein of One Hundred and One Dalmatians (1961). To simplify the narrative, the character of Elvira the maid—originally set to be voiced by Elsa Lanchester—was cut entirely. This removal streamlined the plot and established Edgar the butler as the film's sole central antagonist.

=== Casting ===
As with The Jungle Book (1967), the characters were patterned on the personalities of the voice actors. In 1966, Disney contacted Phil Harris to improvise the script, and shortly after, he was cast to voice Thomas O'Malley. To differentiate the character from Baloo, Reitherman noted O'Malley was "more based on Clark Gable than Wallace Beery, who was partly the model for Baloo." Furthermore, Reitherman cast Eva Gabor as Duchess, remarking she had "the freshest femme voice we've ever had", and Sterling Holloway as Roquefort. Louis Armstrong was initially reported to voice Scat Cat, but he had to back out of the project due to illness. Out of desperation, Scatman Crothers was hired to voice the character under the direction to imitate Armstrong. Pat Buttram and George Lindsey were cast as the farm dogs, which proved to be so popular with the filmmakers that another scene was included to have the dogs when Edgar returns to the farm to retrieve his displaced hat and umbrella.

=== Animation ===
Ken Anderson spent eighteen months developing the design of the characters. Five of Disney's legendary "Nine Old Men" worked on it, including the Disney crew that had been working 25 years on average. Originally, O'Malley was going to be drawn with stripes to have him resemble a tabby cat, but this was dropped after Reitherman remembered the difficulty in animating Shere Khan in The Jungle Book.

== Music ==
The Aristocats

Film score by George Bruns
- Released: 1970
- Genres: Classical, soundtrack, classic pop
- Label: Disneyland Records

The Aristocats was the last Disney animated feature Robert and Richard Sherman worked on as staff songwriters, growing frustrated by the studio's management following Disney's death. While employed, the Sherman Brothers completed their work on the film, but they would not return to Disney until they were asked to compose songs for The Tigger Movie (2000).

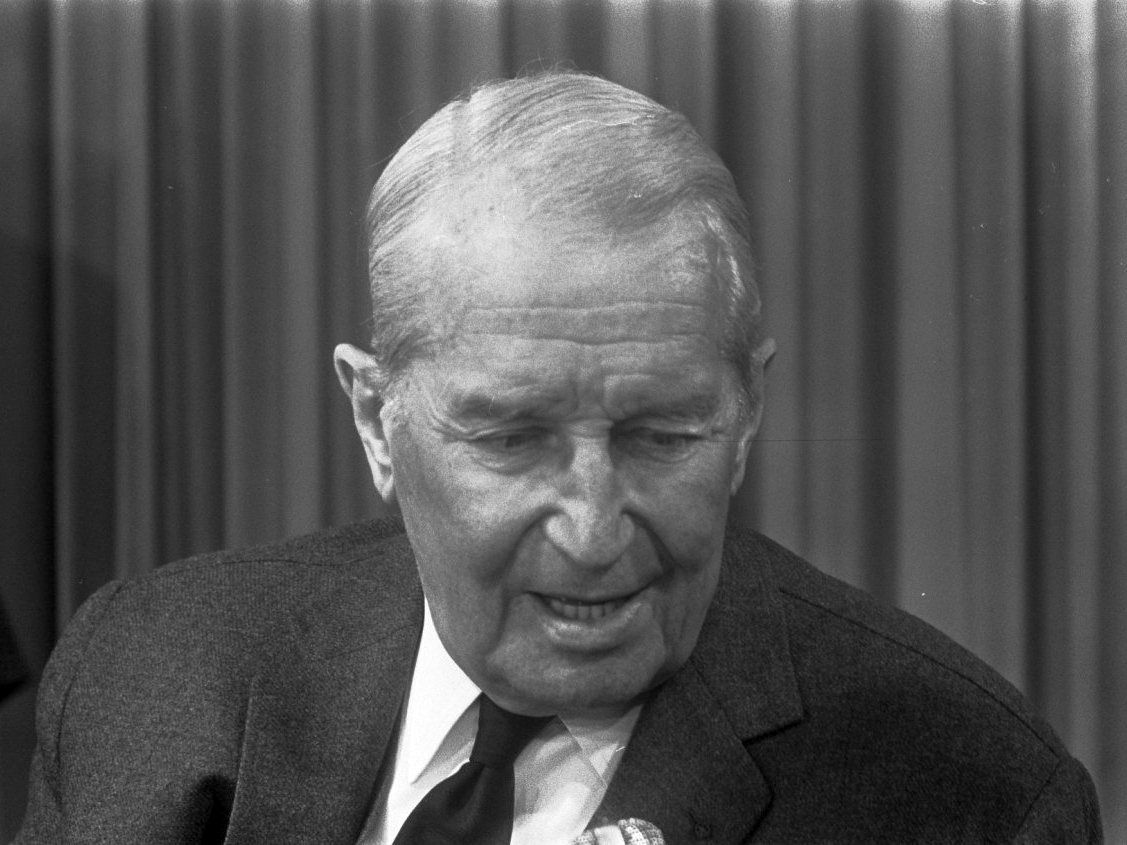
Maurice Chevalier (pictured here) was brought out of retirement to sing the title song.

The Sherman Brothers composed multiple songs, but only the title song and "Scales and Arpeggios" were included in the film. Desiring to capture the essence of France, the Sherman Brothers composed the song "The Aristocats". Disney film producer Bill Anderson suggested Maurice Chevalier should sing the title song. Following the suggestion, Richard Sherman imitated Chevalier's voice as he performed a demo for the song. Chevalier received the demo and was brought out of retirement to sing the song. Deleted songs that were intended for the film included "Pourquoi?" sung by Hermione Baddeley as Madame Bonfamille, its reprise, and "She Never Felt Alone" sung by Robie Lester as Duchess.

For the show-stopping musical number, the Sherman Brothers composed "Le Jazz Hot", but "Ev'rybody Wants to Be a Cat", composed by Floyd Huddleston and Al Rinker, was used instead. Lastly, a villainous song was envisioned to be sung by Edgar and his assistant Elvira as a romantic duet, but the song was dropped when Elvira was removed from the story. Another deleted song was for Thomas O'Malley titled "My Way's The Highway", but the filmmakers had Terry Gilkyson compose the eponymous song "Thomas O'Malley Cat". Gilkyson explained, "It was the same song, but they orchestrated it twice. They used the simpler one, because they may have thought the other too elaborate or too hot. It was a jazz version with a full orchestra."

The instrumental music was composed by George Bruns, who drew from his background with jazz bands in the 1940s and decided to feature the accordion-like musette for French flavor.

Classic Disney: 60 Years of Musical Magic includes "Thomas O'Malley Cat" on the purple disc and "Ev'rybody Wants to Be a Cat" on the orange disc. Disney's Greatest Hits includes "Ev'rybody Wants to Be a Cat" on the red disc.

On August 21, 2015, in honor of the film's 45th anniversary, a new soundtrack was released as part of Walt Disney Records: The Legacy Collection. The release includes the songs and score as used in the film, along with The Lost Chords of the Aristocats (featuring songs written for the film but not used), and previously released album versions of the songs as bonus tracks.

=== Songs ===
Original songs performed in the film include:

No.	Title	Writer(s)	Performer(s)	Length
1.	"The Aristocats"	Robert and Richard Sherman	Maurice Chevalier
2.	"Scales and Arpeggios"	Robert and Richard Sherman	Robie Lester, Gary Dubin, Liz English & Dean Clark
3.	"Thomas O'Malley Cat"	Terry Gilkyson	Phil Harris
4.	"Ev'rybody Wants to Be a Cat"	Floyd Huddleston and Al Rinker	Scatman Crothers, Phil Harris, Robie Lester & Chorus
5.	"She Never Felt Alone"	Robert and Richard Sherman	Robie Lester
6.	"Ev'rybody Wants to Be a Cat (Reprise)"	Floyd Huddleston and Al Rinker	Chorus

== Release ==
The Aristocats was originally released to theaters on December 24, 1970. The film was released as a double feature with Niok, the Orphan Elephant (1957). It was re-released in theaters in 1980 and 1987.

=== Home media ===
It was released on VHS in Europe on January 1, 1990, and in the UK in 1995. It was first released on VHS in North America on April 24, 1996, as part of the Masterpiece Collection.

In January 2000, Walt Disney Home Video launched the Gold Classic Collection, and The Aristocats was released on VHS and DVD on April 4, 2000. The DVD contained the film in its 1.33:1 aspect ratio enhanced with Dolby 2.0 surround sound. The Gold Collection release was quietly discontinued in 2006. A new single-disc Special Edition DVD (previously announced as a 2-Disc set) was released on February 5, 2008.

Disney released the film on Blu-ray for the first time on August 21, 2012. The 2-disc Special Edition Blu-ray/DVD combo (both in Blu-ray and DVD packaging) featured a new digital transfer and new bonus material. A single disc DVD edition was also released on the same day.

In honor of Disney's 100th anniversary, The Aristocats was re-released on February 28, 2023 as a Disney100 Edition (BLU-RAY + DVD). A Walmart-exclusive package, released the same day, contains a collectible commemorative pin.

== Reception ==
=== Box office ===
By January 1972, The Aristocats had earned $10.1 million in box office rentals from the United States and Canada. Overseas, the film became the most popular "general release" movie at the British box office in 1971 with rentals of $2.6 million.

The Aristocats was the most widely-attended film in France in 1971, with 12.7 million in ticket admissions. It is currently the 20th highest-grossing film of all-time in France, earning $3.6 million in box office rentals. That same year, the film was the most widely-attended film released in Germany with ticket admissions of 11.3 million. It is currently Germany's 11th highest-grossing film of all-time. By the end of its initial theatrical run, the film had earned domestic rentals of $11 million and $17 million in international countries, for a worldwide rental of $28 million.

The film was re-released to theaters in the United States on December 19, 1980, where it grossed an additional $18 million and again on April 10, 1987, where it grossed $17 million. The film grossed $32 million worldwide from an international re-release in 1994, including $11 million in France. The Aristocats has had a lifetime gross of $55.7 million in the United States and Canada, and its total lifetime worldwide box office gross is $191 million.

=== Critical reaction ===
On review aggregator Rotten Tomatoes, 64% of 33 critics gave the film a positive review, with an average rating of 5.8/10, earning it a score of "Fresh". The website's consensus states, "Though The Aristocats is a mostly middling effort for Disney, it is redeemed by terrific work from its voice cast and some jazzy tunes." On Metacritic, the film holds a weighted average score of 66 out of 100, based on 12 critics, indicating "generally favorable reviews".

Howard Thompson of The New York Times praised the film as "grand fun all the way, nicely flavored with tunes, and topped with one of the funniest jam sessions ever by a bunch of scraggly Bohemians headed by one Scat Cat." Roger Ebert, writing for the Chicago Sun-Times, awarded the film three stars out of four, summarizing The Aristocats as "light and pleasant and funny, the characterization is strong, and the voices of Phil Harris (O'Malley the Alley Cat) and Eva Gabor (Duchess, the mother cat) are charming in their absolute rightness." Charles Champlin of the Los Angeles Times wrote that the film "has a gentle good-natured charm which will delight the small-fry and their elders alike." He praised the animation, but remarked that the film "lacks a certain kind of vigor, boldness and dash, a kind of a hard-focused emphasis which you would say was a Disney trademark." Arthur D. Murphy of Variety praised the film writing the film is "[h]elped immeasurably by the voices of Phil Harris, Eva Gabor, Sterling Holloway, Scatman Crothers and others, plus some outstanding animation, songs, sentiment, some excellent dialog and even a touch of psychedelia." Stefan Kanfer, reviewing for Time magazine, noted that "[t]he melodies in Disney's earlier efforts have been richer. But for integration of music, comedy and plot, The Aristocats has no rivals."

Gene Siskel of the Chicago Tribune felt the film's "artwork and story do not compare to the truly great Disney films Snow White, Pinocchio, Bambi and Dumbo but there is enough juvenile humor to keep the children in their seats for the 78 minutes." For its 1987 re-release, animation historian Charles Solomon expressed criticism for its episodic plot, anachronisms, and borrowed plot elements from earlier Disney animated features, but nevertheless wrote "[b]ut even at their least original, the Disney artists provide better animation--and more entertainment--than the recent animated features hawking The Care Bears, Rainbow Brite and Transformers." Writing in his book The Disney Films, Disney historian and film critic Leonard Maltin wrote that "[t]he worst that one could say of The AristoCats is that it is unmemorable. It's smoothly executed, of course, and enjoyable, but neither its superficial story nor its characters have any resonance." Additionally, in his book Of Mice and Magic, Maltin criticized the film for re-using Phil Harris to replicate The Jungle Book's Baloo, dismissing the character Thomas O'Malley as "essentially the same character, dictated by the same voice personality."

=== Controversy ===
In 2021, the film was one of several that Disney limited to viewers 7 years of age and older on their streaming service Disney+, stating that the character Shun Gon was a racist stereotype of East Asian people.

=== Accolades ===
The film is recognized by American Film Institute in these lists:

- 2008: AFI's 10 Top 10:
  - Nominated Animation Film

== Other media ==
=== Novel ===
In 1986, a novel was published.

=== Cancelled sequel ===
In 2005, Disneytoon Studios originally planned to make a follow-up to the film, along with sequels to Chicken Little (2005) and Meet the Robinsons (2007). Originally intended to be a 2D animated feature, Disney executives decided to produce the film in computer animation in order to garner more interest. Additionally, the story was meant to center around Marie, Duchess's daughter, who becomes smitten by another kitten aboard a luxury cruise ship. However, she and her family must soon take on a jewel thief on the open seas. The project was cancelled when John Lasseter was named Disney's new chief creative officer, in which he called off all future sequels Disneytoon had planned and instead make original productions or spin-offs.

=== Cancelled live-action remake ===
In January 2022, it was announced that a live-action remake was in development with Will Gluck producing under his Olive Bridge Entertainment banner and Keith Bunin writing the script with Gluck. Questlove was attached to direct the film in March 2023. In August 2025, Questlove revealed that the film was no longer moving forward.

=== Other animated productions ===
The characters of the film have recurring cameo appearances in the television series House of Mouse. A recurring gag in the series being that O'Malley and the alley cats are often hired for a show at the titular club, but it gets cancelled because they are replaced by others.

Abigail (voiced by Kaitlyn Robrock) and Amelia (voiced by Haley Clair) have a secondary role in the 2026 Lego special Lego Disney Princess: Magical Mayhem.

=== Video games ===
Duchess, Thomas O'Malley, Berlioz, Marie, and Toulouse were added as playable characters to the city-building mobile game Disney Magic Kingdoms in September 2023, along with attractions based on Madame's Mansion and O'Malley's Pad.

In Disney Dreamlight Valley, Abigail and Amelia appear as animal companions for the player.

== See also ==
- A Cat in Paris
- Gay Purr-ee
- List of highest-grossing animated films
- List of highest-grossing films in France
- List of American films of 1970
- List of animated feature films of 1970
- List of Walt Disney Pictures films
- List of Disney theatrical animated features

== Bibliography ==
- Koenig, David (1997). Mouse Under Glass: Secrets of Disney Animation & Theme Parks. Irvine, California: Bonaventure Press. ISBN 978-0-964-06051-7.
- Tytle, Harry (1997). One of "Walt's Boys": An Insider's Account of Disney's Golden Years. A.S.A.P. Publishing. pp. 193–197. OCLC 801247518.
