= The Boomtang Boys =

Canadian dance-pop musicians

- Origin: Toronto, Ontario, Canada
- Genres: Electronic, dance
- Years active: 1991–present
- Members: Tony Grace; Rob DeBoer
- Past members: Paul Grace

The Boomtang Boys are Canadian dance-remix musicians and music producers. They are known for both their remix work and pop-dance music, in particular their singles "Squeeze Toy" and "Movin' On", which both topped the Canadian singles chart.

== History ==
The Boomtang Boys first came together in 1991 as a music production group. The group created dance-friendly remixes of familiar songs, as well as produced music for a number of musicians and bands, including the Juno-awarded Deeper Shade of Love by Camille.

Their debut album, Greatest Hits Volume One, was released in 1999 and produced the hit "Squeeze Toy" as well as "Pictures", both performed by Kim Esty. Greatest Hits did well in Canada, achieving gold status in sales. The single "Popcorn" appeared on the RPM dance chart in 1999. The group also produced "The Hampsterdance Song", a track based on the Hampster Dance meme; the song reached number one on Nielsen SoundScan's Canadian Singles Chart in mid-2000. "Squeeze Toy" and "Movin' On", a single from 2002, topped this chart as well. They also served as executive producers of Hampsterdance: The Album (2000).

In addition to their own recordings, they are known for several remixes for artists such as the Philosopher Kings, Bif Naked, Econoline Crush and Kim Stockwood. They are still active and involved in a number of production and remix projects. Members Tony Grace and Rob DeBoer also tour internationally as the jazz ensemble Four80East.

Paul Grace died on August 7, 2019, at the age of 63.

== Discography ==
=== Studio albums ===
Title	Details	Peak chart positions	Certifications (sales threshold)
Title	Details	CAN	Certifications (sales threshold)
Greatest Hits Volume One	Release date: July 13, 1999 (Canada); Label: Virgin Music Canada; Formats: CD	23	CAN: Gold
Wet	Release date: October 15, 2002; Label: Virgin Music Canada; Formats: CD	—	
"—" denotes releases that did not chart

=== Singles ===
Year	Song	Chart peak		Album
Year	Song	CAN	CAN Dance	Album
1999	"Popcorn" (featuring Fred)	—	10	Greatest Hits Volume One
1999	"Squeeze Toy" (featuring Kim Esty)	10	5	Greatest Hits Volume One
1999	"Pictures" (featuring Kim Esty)	23	—	Greatest Hits Volume One
2000	"Both Sides Now"	23	—	
2002	"Movin' On"	1	—	Wet
"—" denotes a release that did not chart.
