= Duke Ellington Plays Mary Poppins =

1965 album by Duke Ellington

Studio album by Duke Ellington
- Released: 1965
- Recorded: September 6, 8 & 9, 1964
- Studio: Universal, Chicago
- Genre: Jazz
- Label: Reprise

Duke Ellington chronology
Ellington '65 (1964)	Duke Ellington Plays Mary Poppins (1965)	Ellington '66 (1965)

Duke Ellington Plays Mary Poppins is an album by American pianist, composer and bandleader Duke Ellington, recorded in 1964 and released on the Reprise label in 1965. The album features recordings of tunes from the 1964 musical film Mary Poppins arranged by Ellington and Billy Strayhorn.

== Reception ==
The AllMusic review by Scott Yanow stated: "This disc is a surprising success. Duke Ellington was somehow persuaded into revising and recording a dozen songs from the score of Walt Disney's Mary Poppins, and the results are actually quite memorable."

Professional ratings
Review scores
Source	Rating
AllMusic	3.5/5 stars

== Track listing ==
All compositions by Richard M. Sherman and Robert B. Sherman

1. "A Spoonful of Sugar" – 3:13
2. "Chim Chim Cher-ee" – 2:52
3. "Feed the Birds" – 3:42
4. "Let's Go Fly a Kite" – 2:31
5. "Stay Awake" – 2:28
6. "I Love to Laugh" – 2:29
7. "Jolly Holiday" – 3:04
8. "Sister Suffragette" – 3:05
9. "The Perfect Nanny" – 4:09
10. "Step in Time" – 2:46
11. "The Life I Lead" – 3:43
12. "Supercalifragilisticexpialidocious" – 2:27
- Recorded at Universal Studios, Chicago, on September 6, 8 & 9, 1964.

== Personnel ==
- Duke Ellington – piano
- Cat Anderson, Herb Jones, Cootie Williams, Nat Woodard – trumpet
- Lawrence Brown, Buster Cooper – trombone
- Chuck Connors – bass trombone
- Jimmy Hamilton – clarinet, tenor saxophone
- Johnny Hodges – alto saxophone
- Russell Procope – alto saxophone, clarinet
- Paul Gonsalves, Eddie Johnson – tenor saxophone
- Harry Carney – baritone saxophone
- John Lamb – bass
- Sam Woodyard – drums
