= Mary Poppins Returns (soundtrack) =

2018 soundtrack album by Marc Shaiman and Scott Wittman

Mary Poppins Returns: Original Motion Picture Soundtrack

Soundtrack album by Marc Shaiman and Scott Wittman
- Released: December 7, 2018
- Studio: Air Lyndhurst Studios; Abbey Road Studios; British Grove Studios
- Genre: Film score; musical
- Length: 78:10
- Label: Walt Disney
- Producer: Marc Shaiman; Rob Marshall; John DeLuca; Marc Platt (exec.)

Mary Poppins chronology
Mary Poppins: Original Cast Soundtrack (1964)	Mary Poppins Returns: Original Motion Picture Soundtrack (2018)

Mary Poppins Returns: Original Motion Picture Soundtrack is the soundtrack album for the film of the same name. The songs and score for the film were composed by Marc Shaiman, with song lyrics written by Scott Wittman and Shaiman. The soundtrack album was released by Walt Disney Records on December 7, 2018.

The songs feature vocal performances by the film's cast consisting of Emily Blunt, Lin-Manuel Miranda, Ben Whishaw, Emily Mortimer, Pixie Davies, Julie Walters, Dick Van Dyke, Angela Lansbury, and Meryl Streep.

== Background ==
Composer-songwriter Marc Shaiman and co-lyricist Scott Wittman began working on the score and songs in 2016. They wrote nine original songs for the film. In 2018, the song The Place Where Lost Things Go was nominated for an Oscar for Best Original Song and the film score was also nominated for Best Original Score.

The score includes musical references to the songs and score from the first film written by the Sherman Brothers: these songs include "A Spoonful of Sugar", "The Perfect Nanny", "Feed the Birds" and "Let's Go Fly a Kite". Richard M. Sherman served as music consultant, with Shaiman stating that "if he had something that he thought should have been different or changed, he would have said so. But lo and behold, he didn’t. He was loving what he was hearing, and he really loves the new movie".

On November 26, 2018, "The Place Where Lost Things Go" (sung by Emily Blunt) and "Trip a Little Light Fantastic" (sung by Lin-Manuel Miranda and the cast) were released, and the soundtrack was made available for digital pre-order.

As indicated in the liner notes, the track "Theme from Mary Poppins Returns" was not used in the final film; it was, however, featured in trailers for the movie. One song deleted from the film before a cast recording was made, "The Anthropomorphic Zoo" - a song originally intended for the "Royal Doulton Bowl" sequence - is excluded from the soundtrack album, but a demo recording, illustrated with storyboard images, is included as a bonus feature on the home media release of the film.

== Track listing ==
All lyrics are written by Marc Shaiman & Scott Wittman; all music is composed by Shaiman.

No.	Title	Performer(s)	Length
1.	"(Underneath the) Lovely London Sky (quotes "The Life I Lead" by the Sherman Brothers)"	Lin-Manuel Miranda	3:47
2.	"Overture"		2:28
3.	"A Conversation"	Ben Whishaw	2:42
4.	"Can You Imagine That?"	Emily Blunt, Pixie Davies, Joel Dawson & Nathanael Saleh	4:22
5.	"The Royal Doulton Music Hall"	Blunt, Miranda, Davies, Dawson & Saleh	3:01
6.	"Introducing Mary Poppins"	Miranda & Blunt	0:31
7.	"A Cover is Not the Book"	Blunt, Miranda, The Doulton Music Hall Audience & Ensemble	4:25
8.	"The Place Where Lost Things Go"	Blunt	3:43
9.	"Turning Turtle"	Meryl Streep, Blunt, Miranda, Davies, Dawson & Saleh	4:20
10.	"Trip a Little Light Fantastic"	Miranda, Blunt, Tarik Frimpong, Davies, Dawson, Saleh & Leeries	7:02
11.	"The Place Where Lost Things Go (Reprise)"	Dawson, Saleh & Davies	1:30
12.	"Trip a Little Light Fantastic (Reprise)"	Dick Van Dyke, Blunt, Miranda, Whishaw, Davies, Dawson & Saleh	0:46
13.	"Nowhere to Go But Up (quotes "Let's Go Fly a Kite" and "A Spoonful of Sugar" by the Sherman Brothers)"	Angela Lansbury, Whishaw, Davies, Dawson, Saleh, Miranda, Emily Mortimer, Julie Walters & Company	5:45
14.	"(Underneath the) Lovely London Sky (Reprise) (quotes "The Perfect Nanny" by the Sherman Brothers)"	Miranda	1:52
15.	"Theme from Mary Poppins Returns"		1:38
16.	"Kite Takes Off (quotes "Chim Chim Cher-ee" by the Sherman Brothers)"	featuring Miranda	2:40
17.	"Mary Poppins Arrives (quotes "A Spoonful of Sugar" and "The Perfect Nanny" by the Sherman Brothers)"		1:41
18.	"Magic Papers (quotes "Fidelity Fiduciary Bank" by the Sherman Brothers)"		1:33
19.	"Banks in the Bank (quotes "Fidelity Fiduciary Bank")"		0:43
20.	"Into the Royal Doulton Bowl"		1:58
21.	"Rescuing Georgie"		4:01
22.	"Off to Topsy's (quotes "The Perfect Nanny" by the Sherman Brothers)"		2:53
23.	"Chase Through the Bank"		1:11
24.	"Lost in a Fog"		0:59
25.	"Goodbye Old Friend"		2:32
26.	"Race to Big Ben"		4:55
27.	"End Title Suite (quotes "Supercalifragilisticexpialidocious" by the Sherman Brothers)"	featuring the cast	5:12
Total length:			78:10

== Charts ==
=== Weekly charts ===
Chart (2018–19)	Peak position
Australian Albums (ARIA)	15
Austrian Albums (Ö3 Austria)	63
Belgian Albums (Ultratop Flanders)	85
Belgian Albums (Ultratop Wallonia)	79
Canadian Albums (Billboard)	73
South Korean Albums (Gaon)	95
US Billboard 200	34
US Soundtrack Albums (Billboard)	5

=== Year-end charts ===
Chart (2019)	Position
US Soundtrack Albums (Billboard)	19
