= The Magical Music of Walt Disney =

Box set
- Released: 1978
- Recorded: 1928 – 1978
- Genre: Soundtrack
- Label: Ovation
- Producer: Dick Schory

The Magical Music of Walt Disney is a 4-volume compilation album of Disney music and songs up through 1978, to coincide with the fiftieth anniversary of Mickey Mouse. However, it did not put The Adventures of Ichabod and Mr. Toad, Alice in Wonderland, The Aristocats, and Bedknobs and Broomsticks on the records.

== Track listings ==
=== Volume One ===
==== Side A ====
1. Mickey Mouse Revue

- Orchestra Tuning
- Count-Off
- Heigh-Ho
- Whistle While You Work
- When You Wish Upon a Star
- Hi-Diddle-Dee-Dee
- Mickey Mouse Alma Mater

2. Steamboat Willie

- Turkey in the Straw

3. Mickey's Early Years (1929 – 1934)

- Minnie's Yoo Hoo (Mickey's Follies)
- In the Shade of the Old Apple Tree (The Delivery Boy)
- St. Louis Blues (Blue Rhythm)
- Maple Leaf Rag (The Whoopee Party)
- Runnin' Wild (The Whoopee Party)
- Who'll Buy a Box Lunch? (Building a Building)
- Congratulations, Mr. Mickey Mouse (Mickey's Gala Premiere)
- Sextette From "Lucia" (Orphan's Benefit)

4. Maestro Mickey Conducts (1935 – 1942)

- William Tell Overture (The Band Concert)
- Quartet From "Rigoletto" (Mickey's Grand Opera)
- Light Cavalry Overture (Symphony Hour)

5. Three Little Pigs (1933)

- Who's Afraid of the Big Bad Wolf?

==== Side B ====
1. Snow White and the Seven Dwarfs (1937)

- One Song
- I'm Wishing
- With a Smile and a Song
- Dig Dig Dig
- Some Day My Prince Will Come
- Heigh-Ho
- Whistle While You Work
- A Silly Song
- One Song
- Some Day My Prince Will Come (Reprise/Finale)

2. Fantasia (1940)

- The Sorcerer's Apprentice

3. Pinocchio (1940)

- Overture
- When You Wish Upon a Star
- Little Wooden Head
- The Blue Fairy Appears
- Give a Little Whistle
- I've Got No Strings
- Hi-Diddle-Dee-Dee
- Whale Chase
- Pinocchio Celebration
- When You Wish Upon a Star (Reprise/Finale)

=== Volume Two ===
==== Side A ====
1. Dumbo (1941)

- Overture
- Look Out For Mr. Stork
- Casey Jr.
- Baby Mine
- Pink Elephants On Parade
- When I See An Elephant Fly
- Dumbo's Triumph
- When I See An Elephant Fly (Reprise/Finale)

2. Bambi (1942)

- Opening Theme
- Everybody Awake
- The Little Prince
- Love Is A Song
- Thumper Theme
- Little April Shower
- Gallop Of The Stags
- King Of The Forest
- Love Is A Song
- Man Is In The Forest
- Let's Sing A Gay Little Spring Song
- Sleepy Morning In The Woods
- I Bring You A Song
- Love Is A Song (Reprise)

3. Animated Classics of the 40s (1941 – 1948)

- The Reluctant Dragon (The Reluctant Dragon, 1941)
- Saludos Amigos (Saludos Amigos, 1943)
- The Three Caballeros (The Three Caballeros, 1945)
- You Belong To My Heart (The Three Caballeros, 1945)
- Make Mine Music (Make Mine Music, 1946)
- The Martins & The Coys (Make Mine Music, 1946)
- Shortnin' Bread (Make Mine Music, 1946)
- Fun And Fancy Free (Fun And Fancy Free, 1947)
- Melody Time (Melody Time, 1948)
- Little Toot (Melody Time, 1948)

==== Side B ====
1. Song of the South (1946)

- Song of the South
- Uncle Remus Said
- Zip-A-Dee-Doo-Dah
- Sooner Or Later
- Ev'rybody Has A Laughing Place
- Zip-A-Dee-Doo-Dah (Reprise)

2. Cinderella (1950)

- Cinderella
- A Dream Is A Wish Your Heart Makes
- King's Remarks (Dialogue)
- Oh Sweet Nightingale
- The Work Song
- Bibbidi-Bobbidi-Boo
- So This Is Love
- A Dream Is A Wish Your Heart Makes (Reprise)

3. Peter Pan (1953)

- The Second Star To The Right
- You Can Fly! You Can Fly! You Can Fly!
- A Pirate's Life
- Your Mother & Mine
- You Can Fly! (Reprise/Finale)

=== Volume Three ===
==== Side A ====
1. Lady And The Tramp (1955)

- Overture: Bella Notte
- Peace On Earth
- Loch Lomond
- We Are Siamese (The Siamese Cat Song)
- Bella Notte
- Home Sweet Home
- He's A Tramp
- Peace On Earth (Finale)

2. Sleeping Beauty (1959)

- Fanfare & Once Upon A Dream
- Hail To Princess Aurora
- Sleeping Beauty Song
- I Wonder
- Once Upon A Dream
- Skumps
- Sleeping Beauty Song
- Once Upon A Dream (Reprise & Finale)

3. The Vanishing Prairie (1954)

- Music From "The Vanishing Prairie"

==== Side B ====
1. The Later Animated Years (1961 – 1973)

- Cruella De Ville (101 Dalmatians, 1961)
- Sword In The Stone (Sword In The Stone, 1963)
- Winnie The Pooh And The Honey Tree (Winnie The Pooh And The Honey Tree, 1966)
- Winnie The Pooh (Winnie The Pooh And The Honey Tree, 1966)
- Up, Down, Touch The Ground (Winnie The Pooh And The Honey Tree, 1966)
- Rumbly In My Tumbly (Winnie The Pooh And The Honey Tree, 1966)
- Little Black Rain Cloud (Winnie The Pooh And The Honey Tree, 1966)
- Rumbly/Reprise & Winnie Finale (Winnie The Pooh And The Honey Tree, 1966)
- Colonel Hathi's March (Jungle Book, 1967)
- The Bare Necessities (Jungle Book, 1967)
- I Wan'na Be Like You (Jungle Book, 1967)
- Oo-De-Lally (Robin Hood, 1973)
- Love (Robin Hood, 1973)
- Love Goes On & Oo-De-Lally Finale (Robin Hood, 1973)

2. The Rescuers (1977)

- The Journey
- The Rescue Aid Society
- Someone's Waiting For You
- Tomorrow Is Another Day

=== Volume Four ===
==== Side A ====
1. Mary Poppins (1964)

- Overture
- Sister Suffragette
- The Life I Lead
- The Perfect Nanny
- A Spoonful Of Sugar
- Chim Chim Cher-ee
- Jolly Holiday
- Supercalifragilisticexpialidocious
- Stay Awake
- I Love To Laugh
- The Life I Lead (A British Bank)
- Feed The Birds
- Fidelity Fiduciary Bank
- Chim Chim Cher-ee
- Step In Time
- Let's Go Fly A Kite/Finale

==== Side B ====
1. Pete's Dragon (1977)

- Brazzle Dazzle Day
- I Saw A Dragon
- It's Not Easy
- Candle On The Water
- Every Little Piece
- Brazzle Dazzle Day (End Title)

2. Live Music From The Magic Kingdoms

- "King Mickey" March (Walt Disney World Band)
- The Coney Island Washboard (The Dapper Dans)
- Minnie's Yoo Hoo (The Keystone Cops)
- Maple Leaf Rag (The Main Street Pianist)
- Swanee River (The Banjo Kings)
- British Grenadiers (The Fife & Drum Corp)
- Tennessee (The Blue Grass Boys)
- America The Beautiful (Walt Disney World Band)

3. Music Of The Magic Kingdom Attractions

- It's A Small World
- Yo Ho (A Pirate's Life For Me)
- Grim Grinning Ghosts
- The Tiki Tiki Tiki Room
- The Ballad Of Davey Crockett (Country Bear Jamboree)
- Yankee Doodle (America Sings)
- Lincoln Dialogue And Battle Hymn Of The Republic (Hall Of Presidents)
