= Simpsoncalifragilisticexpiala(Annoyed Grunt)cious =

- The Simpsons episode
- Episode no.: Season 8 Episode 13
- Directed by: Chuck Sheetz
- Written by: Al Jean & Mike Reiss
- Production codes: 3F27; 3G03
- Original air date: February 7, 1997

Guest appearance
- Maggie Roswell as Shary Bobbins

Episode features
- Chalkboard gag: "I will not hide the teacher's Prozac"
- Couch gag: The living room is empty. Outside, Homer is struggling with a locked front door while the other members of the family wait impatiently.
- Commentary: Matt Groening; Al Jean; Mike Reiss; Chuck Sheetz; David Silverman

Episode chronology
← Previous "Mountain of Madness"	Next → "The Itchy & Scratchy & Poochie Show"
- The Simpsons season 8

"Simpsoncalifragilisticexpiala(Annoyed Grunt)cious", also known as "SimpsoncalifragilisticexpialaD'ohcious", is the thirteenth episode of the eighth season of the American animated television series The Simpsons, that originally aired on the Fox network in the United States on February 7, 1997. When Marge becomes stressed, the Simpsons hire a nanny, a Mary Poppins parody named Shary Bobbins (voiced by Maggie Roswell). The episode was directed by Chuck Sheetz and written and executive produced by Al Jean and Mike Reiss. It was the last episode for which Reiss received a writing credit. In 2014, Jean selected it as one of five essential episodes in the show's history.

== Plot ==
When Marge finds that she is losing her hair at an alarming rate, she visits Dr. Hibbert, who informs her that stress is the cause. The Simpson family decide to hire a nanny to perform housework and childcare while Marge recovers. They are unable to find anyone suitable, after Homer chases away two applicants, accusing one of them of being similar to Mrs. Doubtfire. A woman then glides from the sky with a magical-parrot headed umbrella, introducing herself as Shary Bobbins. She is deemed perfect and is hired. Shary proves helpful for the Simpson family, and Marge's hair grows back once her stress subsides. As the reformed family sits down to a perfect dinner, Shary declares her work done and prepares to leave, only for the family to instantly revert to their original state of dysfunction the moment she steps out of the house. Resignedly, she decides to stay, and is ultimately forced to when Grampa accidentally takes her umbrella.

The family begins to treat Shary poorly, and they lose interest in her zest for life and zealous reform. Declaring that the Simpsons will be the death of her, Shary spirals into depression. She becomes an alcoholic and channels her misery into her singing. Realizing the effect the Simpsons have had on Shary, Marge admits that nothing can change them, and the family expresses their contentment with their lives through a song. Shary accepts that she can do nothing to change the Simpsons' lives and bids farewell to the family as she glides away into the sky using her umbrella; unbeknownst to the Simpsons, she is soon killed after she is sucked into the engine of a passing airplane.

== Production ==
Although the majority of the season eight episodes were executive produced by Bill Oakley and Josh Weinstein, former executive producers Al Jean and Mike Reiss had signed a deal with Disney that allowed them to produce four episodes of The Simpsons. The idea for this episode originated several years before its airdate when Jean and Reiss were the regular showrunners. The idea was pitched at a writers' retreat by Jean but nobody had wanted to flesh it out. After being allowed to come back to produce some episodes, Jean and Reiss decided to write this episode. At first, Reiss was against the episode and felt that it was a bad idea. He felt that the plot was slightly ridiculous and that the show should not feature any magic; except for a few moments, he largely kept magic out of the episode. He now considers it one of the best episodes that he co-wrote. At the time, "Simpsoncalifragilisticexpiala(Annoyed Grunt)cious" had more music in it than any other episode. While writing, Jean thought that the songs would stretch out and make the episode the proper length but it was considerably shorter than required. Several additional scenes, such as the full-length opening sequence and the Itchy & Scratchy segment, were added to pad out the episode. There was originally a sequence where Bart, Lisa and Shary visit Patty and Selma who sing "We Love to Smoke", a parody of "I Love to Laugh". The song was cut because it wasn't getting any laughs but the full version was included on the album Go Simpsonic with The Simpsons and a brief animated version was included as a deleted scene on the Season 8 DVD. During the end song, Homer can be seen dancing along but not singing; this was because the producers forgot to record Dan Castellaneta. Many of the scenes were animated by Eric Stefani, a former member of No Doubt, who specialized in animation for musical numbers.

=== Casting ===
Julie Andrews (who portrayed the titular role in Mary Poppins) was originally slated to appear in the episode as Shary, but in the end, the producers went with series regular Maggie Roswell after hearing Roswell's reading for the part. Quentin Tarantino was also asked to guest star as himself in the Itchy and Scratchy short, but he did not want to deliver the lines required, believing them to be insulting. Instead, regular Dan Castellaneta did the voice.

== Cultural references ==
The overall plot is a reference to the 1964 Disney film Mary Poppins and the book series it was adapted from; Shary Bobbins is based on the character Mary Poppins and the episode title is a spoof of the word "Supercalifragilisticexpialidocious" from the film. Shary insists she is "...an original creation, like Rickey Rouse and Monald Muck" when Homer tries to call her Mary Poppins. Several of the musical numbers are direct parodies of songs from the film, including "The Perfect Nanny", "The Life I Lead", "A Spoonful of Sugar" and "Feed the Birds"; a deleted scene features Patty and Selma singing their version of "I Love to Laugh".

The montage of Marge losing her hair features the song "Hair" from the musical of the same name (though the version heard is The Cowsills version). Homer says he has seen Mrs. Doubtfire and believes that some of the candidates for the role of nanny are men in drag. Homer's imagination is a parody of the dancing characters in Steamboat Willie and features the song "Turkey in the Straw". In the park, Groundskeeper Willie is seen singing a cover version of "Maniac" by Michael Sembello. The scene where Principal Skinner attempts to sell Jimbo is a reference to a similar scene in Dickens's Oliver Twist, more specifically he yells "Boy for Sale", a reference to a song in the musical adaptation Oliver! During the scene, he counters Jimbo's doubts by stating that selling children is legal only in Springfield's state and in Mississippi. Until 2009 there was actually no law in Mississippi prohibiting the sale of children.

The Itchy & Scratchy short "Reservoir Cats" is a parody of the scene in Quentin Tarantino's 1992 film Reservoir Dogs where Mr. Blonde cuts off the ear of the police officer. The sequence features the same setting, camera angles and music — "Stuck in the Middle With You" by Stealers Wheel. At the end, Itchy and Scratchy dance in a manner similar to that seen in Tarantino's 1994 film Pulp Fiction.

Shary and Barney Gumble sing a drunken rendition of Jimmy Buffett's "Margaritaville".

Krusty's television special "Krusty Komedy Klassic" subtly lampshades the implications from its initials which are the same for the Ku Klux Klan. Krusty's "Mad About Shoe" sketch is a reference to the NBC sitcom Mad About You, while the unseen "NYPD Shoe" sketch references the ABC drama NYPD Blue.

== Reception ==
In its original broadcast, "Simpsoncalifragilisticexpiala(Annoyed Grunt)cious" finished 76th in ratings for the week of February 3–9, 1997, with a Nielsen rating of 5.6, equivalent to approximately 5.4 million viewing households.

Alf Clausen received an Emmy Award nomination for "Outstanding Music Direction" for this episode.

In 2014, writers for the series picked "Reservoir Cats" from this episode as one of their nine favorite "Itchy & Scratchy" episodes of all time.
