= Mary Poppins (soundtrack) =

Mary Poppins: Original Cast Soundtrack

Soundtrack album by Irwin Kostal, Julie Andrews
- Released: September 1964
- Recorded: April–December 1963
- Studios: Walt Disney Studios, Burbank
- Genres: Film score; soundtrack
- Length: 53:51
- Label: Buena Vista
- Producer: Jimmy Johnson

Mary Poppins chronology
Mary Poppins: Original Cast Soundtrack (1964)	Mary Poppins Returns: Original Motion Picture Soundtrack (2018)

Julie Andrews chronology
Julie and Carol at Carnegie Hall (1962)	Mary Poppins (1964)	The Sound of Music (1965)

Singles from Mary Poppins
- 1. "A Spoonful of Sugar" Released: 1964; 2. "Supercalifragilisticexpialidocious" Released: 1964

Mary Poppins is the original cast soundtrack album for Walt Disney's 1964 musical film of the same name. Released by Buena Vista Records, the album features music and lyrics by the Sherman Brothers (Richard M. and Robert B. Sherman), performed by Julie Andrews in her Oscar-winning role as the magical nanny, alongside Dick Van Dyke, Glynis Johns, and David Tomlinson.

The album's composition and style reflect a deliberate blend of Edwardian-era British music hall influences and mid-20th-century Broadway craftsmanship. The Sherman Brothers crafted 14 narrative-driven songs, orchestrated by Irwin Kostal. The lyrics balanced themes like child-friendly whimsy ("A Spoonful of Sugar") with subtle social commentary ("Sister Suffragette"). Notably, "Supercalifragilisticexpialidocious" later entered the Oxford English Dictionary.

The soundtrack became a cultural phenomenon, topping the Billboard LP chart for 14 weeks and selling over 2.3 million copies within its first year. Its success was propelled by songs like "Chim Chim Cher-ee" (which won the Academy Award for Best Original Song), "Supercalifragilisticexpialidocious", and the poignant "Feed the Birds (Tuppence a Bag)", Walt Disney's personal favorite. The album sold over 6 million copies up to 1968.

== Background and development ==
The musical development of Mary Poppins began when Walt Disney first attempted to acquire the film rights to P. L. Travers' books in the early 1940s. At that time he promised his daughters, who were fans of the first book, that he would adapt it into a movie. After nearly two decades of negotiations, he finally secured the rights in 1961 and assigned Richard M. Sherman and Robert B. Sherman, known as the Sherman Brothers, to compose the score following their success with previous Disney projects. The development of the soundtrack was closely tied to Disney's creative ambitions and the Shermans' musical ingenuity. The brothers were tasked not only with crafting original songs but also with integrating them into the structure of a live-action film that blended fantasy, musical theater, and animation, marking a significant turning point for the studio’s musical output, with Disney personally overseeing key aspects of the film and its musical narrative.

The creative process involved extensive collaboration between the composers, director Robert Stevenson, and Walt Disney, who held story meetings with the Shermans to discuss how music could advance character and plot. These meetings, later released as part of expanded soundtrack editions, reveal a deliberate intention to use songs as storytelling tools rather than mere interludes. The goal was to ensure that each musical number was motivated by the characters and their situations, a strategy that became central to Disney’s approach to musical filmmaking.

The orchestration of the soundtrack was handled by Irwin Kostal, who had previously worked on West Side Story, and brought a Broadway sensibility to the arrangements. Kostal's work helped translate the Shermans’ compositions into fully realized orchestral pieces that balanced traditional musical theater structures with cinematic dynamics. The music was recorded with the participation of the film’s principal cast, including Julie Andrews, Dick Van Dyke, David Tomlinson, and Glynis Johns, all of whom performed their own vocals.

The recording sessions took place at Walt Disney Studios and were produced in both mono and stereo versions, catering to the audio standards of the era. The soundtrack album was designed to mirror the film experience as closely as possible, with the songs sequenced in a narrative order and accompanied by spoken introductions in some later editions. Over time, the original sessions and demo recordings were preserved, later surfacing in anniversary editions that showcased the early developmental stages of the music and the working relationship between Walt Disney and the Shermans.

== Deleted songs ==
A number of other songs were written for the film by the Sherman Brothers and either rejected or cut for time. Richard Sherman, on the 2004 DVD release, indicated that more than 30 songs were written at various stages of the film's development. No cast recordings of any of these songs have been released to the public, only demos or later performances done by the songwriters — with the exception of the rooftop reprise of "Chim Chim Cher-ee" and the "smoke staircase yodel" mentioned below.

1. "The Chimpanzoo", was originally to follow "I Love to Laugh" during the Uncle Albert "ceiling tea party" sequence, but it was dropped from the soundtrack just before Julie Andrews and company were to record it. The fast-paced number was not unveiled to the public until Richard Sherman, aided by recently uncovered storyboards, performed it on the 2004 DVD edition. The re-creation suggests it was to have been another sequence combining animation and live action.
2. "Practically Perfect" was intended to introduce Mary but instead the melody of the piece was used for "Sister Suffragette" (used to introduce Mrs. Banks). A different song with the same name was written for the stage musical.
3. "The Eyes of Love", a romantic ballad intended for Bert and Mary, but according to Richard Sherman, Julie Andrews told privately to Walt Disney that she wasn't too keen on singing it. In response, "A Spoonful of Sugar" was written.
4. "Mary Poppins Melody" was to be performed when Mary introduces herself to the children. Elements of the song later became part of "Stay Awake". The melody was the basis for a couple of other songs that were ultimately cut from the film.
5. "A Name's a Name". Heard on a recording taken of a meeting between the Sherman Brothers and Travers, this song was originally intended for the nursery scene that later became "A Spoonful of Sugar". The melody was reused for "Mary Poppins Melody".
6. "You Think, You Blink" was a short piece that Bert was to sing just before entering the chalk painting (and starting the "Jolly Holiday" sequence). In the film, Dick Van Dyke simply recites the lyric instead of singing it.
7. "West Wind" was a short ballad to be sung by Mary. The song was later retitled "Mon Amour Perdu" and used in the later Disney film, Big Red.
8. "The Right Side" was to be sung by Mary to Michael after he gets out of bed cranky. It was recycled for the Disney Channel television series Welcome to Pooh Corner as Winnie the Pooh's personal theme song.
9. "Measure Up" was to accompany the scene in which Mary takes the tape measure to Jane and Michael.
10. "Admiral Boom" was to be the theme song for the cannon-firing neighbor of the Banks Residence, but it was cut by Walt Disney as being unnecessary. The melody of the song remains in the film, and the bombastic theme is heard whenever Boom appears onscreen. One line from this song ("The whole world takes its time from Greenwich, but Greenwich, they say, takes its time from Admiral Boom!") is spoken by Bert early in the film.
11. "Sticks, Paper and Strings" was an early version of "Let's Go Fly a Kite."
12. "Lead the Righteous Life", an intentionally poorly written hymn, was to have been sung by Katie Nanna (Elsa Lanchester) along with Jane and Michael prior to Mary Poppins' arrival. The melody was later reused for a similar song in The Happiest Millionaire
13. "The Pearly Song" was not deleted per se but was instead incorporated into "Supercalifragilisticexpialidocious".

The Compass Sequence, a precursor to "Jolly Holiday", was to be a multiple-song sequence. A number of possible musical components have been identified:

1. "South Sea Island Symphony"
2. "Chinese Festival Song"
3. "Tim-Buc-Too" – elements of this were reused for "The Chimpanzoo" which was also cut
4. "Tiki Town" – the melody was reused for "The Chimpanzoo"
5. "North Pole Polka"
6. "Land of Sand" – later rewritten as "Trust in Me" for the animated version of The Jungle Book
7. "The Beautiful Briny" – later used in Bedknobs and Broomsticks
8. "East is East" – another variation on the unused "Mary Poppins Melody".

=== Deleted scores and music ===
- The "Step in Time" sequence ends with the chimney sweeps being scattered by an onslaught of fireworks fired from Admiral Boom's house. In the final film, the scene plays out with sound effects and no music. The DVD release included the original version of the scene which was accompanied by a complex instrumental musical arrangement that combined "Step in Time", the "Admiral Boom" melody (see above), and "A Spoonful of Sugar". This musical arrangement can be heard on the film's original soundtrack.
- Andrews recorded a brief reprise of "Chim Chim Cher-ee" which was to have accompanied Mary, Bert, and the children as they marched across the rooftops of London (an instrumental reprise of "A Spoonful of Sugar" was used as a march instead; however, Andrews and Dick Van Dyke can still be seen and heard singing a reprise of "Chim Chim Cher-ee" in that sequence, just before the other chimney sweeps appear for the "Step in Time" number).
- The robin Mary Poppins whistles with in "A Spoonful of Sugar" originally sang a lyric as well.
- Andrews also recorded a brief yodel which breaks into the first line of "A Spoonful of Sugar" which was to have been used to "activate" the smoke staircase prior to the "Step in Time" number. Although cut from the film, footage of Andrews performing this exists and was included on the 2004 DVD. The DVD also indicates that an alternate version of the yodel performed by Dick Van Dyke may also exist.

== Composition and style ==
The Mary Poppins soundtrack score represents, according to some critics, one of Disney's most musically sophisticated achievements, blending British music hall traditions with Broadway-style storytelling and melodic innovation. As critic William Ruhlmann observes, the composers employed the "British music hall style of the pre-World War I era" to create a soundscape that feels both period-authentic and timelessly fresh, an influence evident in the "buoyancy and glee" of uptempo numbers like "Supercalifragilisticexpialidocious" and "Step in Time", which feature the call-and-response structures and communal energy of Edwardian vaudeville.

Film music critic Cary Wong emphasizes that the Sherman Brothers' "whimsical" score is significantly enhanced by Irwin Kostal's orchestrations, which, in Wong’s view, elevate the material throughout the film. Wong highlights Kostal's ingenuity in specific moments, such as the combination of "an oboe and an E-flat clarinet playing the same note" to achieve the distinctive hurdy-gurdy effect in "Chim Chim Cher-ee". According to the critic, the instrumental score provides remarkable depth, from the "haunting instrumental of 'Feed the Birds' underscoring Mr. Banks' nighttime walk" to the "Carousel chase and penguin dance" sequence that Wong describes as "a wealth of treasure".

Mike Duquette of The Second Disc notes how the Shermans' "deliriously catchy song score" balances complexity and accessibility. He argues that the melodies remain "simple, singable and sincere" while incorporating sophisticated compositional techniques. According to Duquette, the emotional centerpiece "Feed the Birds (Tuppence a Bag)" demonstrates their ability to craft deceptively simple melodies with profound emotional resonance - so powerful that, as Duquette reveals, Walt Disney had the Shermans play it for him weekly.

William Ruhlmann draws attention to the score's thematic construction, particularly the musical contrast between what he describes as the "self-satisfied British male" pomposity of Mr. Banks' "The Life I Lead" and the more fantastical world associated with Mary Poppins. Ruhlmann extends this observation to the vocal performances, contrasting Julie Andrews' "simultaneously warm and proper" delivery with Dick Van Dyke's "awful, but nevertheless entertaining Cockney accent" in the role of Bert. Duquette also identifies Broadway influences in the score, suggesting that the Shermans effectively composed "what might have been a new song for [My Fair Lady’s] Henry Higgins character" in Mr. Banks' signature number.

Discussing archival material, Duquette notes that the uncovered song "Lost Chords" and other demos reveal the Sherman Brothers' prolific creative process. He cites pieces such as "The Eyes of Love" and "The Land of Sand"—later reworked into The Jungle Book's "Trust in Me"—as evidence of their melodic craftsmanship and adaptability to narrative demands. Duquette further observes that the discovery of these demos, along with archival recordings of the Shermans performing early versions for P. L. Travers (including a moment in which Travers unexpectedly joins in on "Feed the Birds"), offers valuable insight into their compositional approach. He concludes that the score's durability is demonstrated by its successful reinterpretation across genres, ranging from Louis Prima's "wig-flipping jazz" renditions to brass arrangements by the UCLA Marching Band, all while preserving its essential musical identity.

== Release ==
The original 1964 album release features seventeen tracks, consisting of sixteen songs and one overture track of film score. The soundtrack album was released by Disneyland Records the same year as the film on LP and reel-to-reel tape. Due to time constraints, some songs were edited (such as "Step in Time", "Jolly Holiday", and "A Spoonful of Sugar"), while songs also featured introductory passages ("Supercalifragilisticexpialidocious") or completed endings ("Sister Suffragette", "Fidelity Fiduciary Bank", "A Man Has Dreams").

Walt Disney Records reissued the soundtrack in 1989, 1991 and 1997, including a 16-minute track of unreleased songs and demo versions. In 2004, as part of the film's 40th anniversary (also called Special Edition), a 28-track disc (as part of a two-disc set) was released. In 2014 (the 50th anniversary of the film's release), the soundtrack was released in a 3-CD edition as part of the Walt Disney Records The Legacy Collection series; this edition includes the complete soundtrack in its entirety, as well as demos of many "lost" tracks.

== Critical reception ==
Professional ratings
Review scores
Source	Rating
AllMusic	4.5/5 stars
Film Score Monthly	5/5 stars

In the AllMusic review by William Ruhlmann, the songs are described as displaying the "brothers' writing ability" through "memorable songs" such as “A Spoonful of Sugar,” “Supercalifragilisticexpialidocious,” “Feed the Birds,” and “Let’s Go Fly a Kite.” Ruhlmann notes that “a great deal of [the success] could be credited to the many unnamed talents at the Disney studio,” but emphasizes that the Shermans' compositions provided "warm and bouncy" music. The review highlights the balance between “glee” and “warmth” in the score, with Julie Andrews praised for her delivery: “simultaneously warm and proper, bright and light.”

Both Billboard and Cash Box gave favorable reviews to the Mary Poppins soundtrack. Billboard highlighted the impact of the star-studded cast and the film’s promotion on the album’s appeal to younger audiences, though not specifically to small children. Similarly, Cash Box emphasized Disney's strong promotional efforts and the star power of Julie Andrews, Dick Van Dyke, and Ed Wynn, noting that the cheerful, nostalgic songs by the Sherman brothers and Disney's box-office magic would ensure the album's commercial success.

The soundtrack also received positive retrospective reviews. Writing for the Los Angeles Times, Maria D. Laso praised the enduring charm of the songs, contrasting them with more recent Disney hits and highlighting memorable numbers such as "A Spoonful of Sugar", "Chim Chim Cheree", and "Step in Time". She also pointed out the value of the CD reissue, which includes an interview with the Sherman Brothers and rare demo recordings. Similarly, Cary Wong of Film Score Monthly celebrated the expanded soundtrack released alongside the 2004 special edition DVD, emphasizing the wealth of previously unreleased material and the joy of finally having the full, whimsical score available. He viewed the release as a treasure trove for fans and a testament to the film's lasting cultural impact.

== Accolades ==
The film's music received critical acclaim, winning two Academy Awards for Best Original Score and Best Original Song (for "Chim Chim Cher-ee") and two Grammy Awards for Best Original Score Written for a Motion Picture and Best Recording for Children.

In 2013, "Supercalifragilisticexpialidocious" entered the Oxford English Dictionary, cementing its cultural impact.

Awards and nominations for Mary Poppins
Year	Award	Category	Result	Ref.
1965	37th Academy Awards	Best Original Score	Won	
1965	37th Academy Awards	Best Original Song (for "Chim Chim Cher-ee")	Won	
1965	7th Annual Grammy Awards	Best Original Score Written for a Motion Picture	Won	
1965	7th Annual Grammy Awards	Best Recording for Children	Won	

== Commercial performance ==
The album entered the Billboard 200 chart at position #140 on October 3, 1964. It reached its peak at #1 on March 13, 1965, where it remained for a total of 14 non-consecutive weeks. In total, the album charted for 114 weeks. In the United States, it also reached number one on the music charts published by Cash Box, Record World, and Music Business. On Cash Box's stereo LP chart, it also reached the number two position. In 1965, Walt Disney Music Company execs accepted a platinum record honoring the second million in sales for the Mary Poppins original cast soundtrack album.

Internationally, the soundtrack debuted at number 20 on 16 January 1965 in UK. It peaked at number 2 on 4 December 1965, and remained on the chart for a total of 82 weeks. In Germany, the album entered the national chart on November 5, 1965. It spent eight weeks on the chart and peaked at number 11.

== Track listing ==
All tracks are written by Richard M. Sherman and Robert B. Sherman, with music adapted and conducted by Irwin Kostal.

Mary Poppins (Original Cast Soundtrack)
No.	Title	Performer(s)	Length
1.	"Overture" (Instrumental)	Richard M. Sherman, Robert B. Sherman	3:01
2.	"Sister Suffragette"	Glynis Johns	1:45
3.	"The Life I Lead"	David Tomlinson	2:01
4.	"The Perfect Nanny"	Karen Dotrice, Matthew Garber	1:39
5.	"A Spoonful of Sugar"	Julie Andrews	4:09
6.	"Pavement Artist"	Dick Van Dyke	2:00
7.	"Jolly Holiday"	Julie Andrews, Dick Van Dyke	5:24
8.	"Supercalifragilisticexpialidocious"	Julie Andrews, Dick Van Dyke	2:03
9.	"Stay Awake"	Julie Andrews	1:45
10.	"I Love to Laugh"	Dick Van Dyke, Ed Wynn, Julie Andrews	2:43
11.	"A British Bank (The Life I Lead)"	David Tomlinson, Julie Andrews	2:08
12.	"Feed the Birds (Tuppence a Bag)"	Julie Andrews	3:51
13.	"Fidelity Fiduciary Bank"	Dick Van Dyke, Bankers, David Tomlinson	3:33
14.	"Chim Chim Cher-ee"	Dick Van Dyke, Julie Andrews, Karen Dotrice, Matthew Garber	2:46
15.	"Step in Time"	Dick Van Dyke and Cast	8:42
16.	"A Man Has Dreams"	David Tomlinson, Dick Van Dyke	4:28
17.	"Let's Go Fly a Kite"	David Tomlinson, Dick Van Dyke, The Londoners	1:53
Total length:			53:51

== Personnel ==
Credits adapted from the liner notes of Mary Poppins record.

- Music by, Lyrics by – Richard M. Sherman, Robert B. Sherman
- Arranged by, Conductor – Irwin Kostal
- Engineer – Brian Ross-Myring, Bruce Botnick
- Producer [Produced for Phonograph Records by] – Jimmy Johnson
- Producer [with the assistance of] – Evelyn Kennedy

== Charts ==
=== Weekly charts ===
Weekly chart performance for Mary Poppins soundtrack
Chart (1964–1965)	Peak position
German Albums (Offizielle Top 100)	11
UK Albums (Official Charts)	2
U. S. (Billboard Top LPs)	1
U. S. (Cash Box Top 100 Albums)	1
U. S. (Cash Box Top 50 Stereo)	2
U. S. (Music Business National Pop LP's)	1
U. S. (Record World Top 100 LP's)	1

=== Year-end charts ===
Chart (1965)	Position
US Billboard 200	1

== Certifications and sales ==
Region	Certification	Certified units/sales
Australia	—	30,000
Canada	—	125,000
Japan	—	20,000
New Zealand	—	10,000
United Kingdom	—	250,000
United Kingdom (BPI) 2013 release	Gold	100,000^{‡}
United States (RIAA)	Gold	4,000,000
Summaries
Worldwide sales up to 1968	—	6,000,000
^{‡} Sales+streaming figures based on certification alone.
