= Stay Awake (Mary Poppins song) =

Song by the Sherman Brothers

Song by Julie Andrews

from the album Mary Poppins (Original Soundtrack)
- Released: 1964
- Label: Walt Disney
- Songwriters: Richard M. Sherman; Robert B. Sherman

"Stay Awake" is a song from Walt Disney's 1964 film Mary Poppins composed by Richard M. Sherman and Robert B. Sherman.

It is a lullaby sung by Mary Poppins (Julie Andrews) to the children Jane and Michael. The children protest when Mary tells them it's time for bed, but when "Stay Awake" is sung, the children yawn and doze off to sleep.

The song has been recorded by several artists, including:

- Duke Ellington
- Collin Raye
- Harry Connick Jr
- Louis Prima
- Suzanne Vega
- The Innocence Mission
- Celtic Woman
- Brian Wilson covered it on his album In the Key of Disney, which was released on October 25, 2011.
- Hayley Westenra

It is not featured in the 2004 stage musical adaptation.

== See also ==
From the next night: Feed the Birds
