= A Man Has Dreams =

Song by the Sherman Brothers

Song by Dick Van Dyke and David Tomlinson

from the album Mary Poppins: Original Cast Soundtrack
- Released: 1964
- Label: Walt Disney
- Songwriter: The Sherman Brothers

"A Man Has Dreams" is a song from the 1964 Walt Disney film Mary Poppins, written by Richard M. Sherman and Robert B. Sherman. In both the motion picture and the 2004 stage musical, the song is performed as a conversational duet between Bert the chimney sweep (Dick Van Dyke) and George Banks (David Tomlinson). It is operatic in nature, sung dialogue, and was highly unusual for a musical film of that era. The song melody is a slowed-down version of "The Life I Lead", which serves as Banks's leitmotif. It incorporates a reprise of "A Spoonful of Sugar" which is Mary Poppins's leitmotif.

The melody first appears as George Banks marches through the front door of his home. At that point in the film, the song is bouncy in nature to reflect Banks's triumphant spirit. The song is then titled "The Life I Lead". It is reprised several times throughout the film. The final reprise is sung when Banks thinks he has lost everything, during which the music is more somber and the song itself retitled, "A Man Has Dreams".

This song is pivotal in both the stage musical as well as the film.

== History ==
According to Disney archival records, the song was originally titled "Mr. Banks and Bert Converse" but the title was changed to its present one, prior to first print publication of sheet music. "A Man Has Dreams" are the first four words of the song; they are not repeated after that.
