= The Life I Lead (play) =

One-man comedy play by James Kettle

- Artwork for the production
- Original language: English
- Written by: James Kettle
- Subject: The life of David Tomlinson
- Genre: Comedy

Premiere
- Date: 6 February 2019
- Place: Northcott Theatre, Exeter

The Life I Lead is a one-man comedy play by James Kettle about the life of English actor David Tomlinson.

== Background ==
Tomlinson was best known for his role as Mr. Banks in the 1964 Disney film Mary Poppins (in which Tomlinson famously sings the Sherman Brothers song, "The Life I Lead" and to which the title of this show refers). Tomlinson was also known for playing Professor Emelius Browne in Bedknobs and Broomsticks (1971) and Peter Thorndyke in The Love Bug (1968).

== Production history ==
=== 2019 UK tour and West End ===
The play premiered at the Northcott Theatre in Exeter on 6 February 2019, prior to touring the UK until April 2019, which included a run at the Park Theatre, London. Comedian and actor Miles Jupp starred as Tomlinson and was directed by Selina Cadell and Didi Hopkins with set and costume design by Lee Newby. The play transferred into London's West End for 8 performances only starring Jupp from 16 to 21 September 2019 at Wyndham's Theatre.

== Critical reception ==
The play opened to critical acclaim, particularly praising Jupp on his performance.
