= Jolly Holiday =

Song by the Sherman Brothers

"Jolly Holliday"

Song by Dick Van Dyke and Julie Andrews

from the album Mary Poppins (Original Soundtrack)
- Released: 1964
- Label: Walt Disney
- Songwriter(s): Richard M. Sherman; Robert B. Sherman

"Jolly Holiday" is a song from Walt Disney's 1964 film Mary Poppins. It was composed by Richard M. Sherman and Robert B. Sherman. The song is sung in the film by Bert (Dick Van Dyke) and Mary (Julie Andrews) in the pastel fantasy sequence before reaching the carousel. Oscar-winning music arranger Irwin Kostal provided the much lauded orchestration. The singing animal voices were provided by Bill Lee (as Ram), Ginny Tyler (as Lambs), Paul Frees (as Barnyard Horse), Marc Breaux (as Cow), Marni Nixon (as Geese), Thurl Ravenscroft (as Hog / Pig) and Peter Ellenshaw (as Penguin Waiter), with Daws Butler, Dal McKennon and Richard M. Sherman voicing the other Penguins.

This song also appears in the 2004 musical, but it was changed to fit the story of Neleus from Mary Poppins Opens the Door.

The motion picture takes place in 1910 (although the P.L. Travers books place the story in 1934) and the song is in the Music Hall style of the period.

This song has been parodied in Forbidden Broadway Cleans Up Its Act and the show's album, with the name "Jolly Holiday with Rudy," which made fun of the cleaning of Broadway at the time.

This musical number also appears in the Sing Along Songs series of Disney videos.
