= Sister Suffragette =

Song from the film Mary Poppins, by Robert B. Sherman and Richard M. Sherman

Song by Glynis Johns

from the album Mary Poppins (Original Soundtrack)
- Released: 1964
- Label: Walt Disney
- Songwriter(s): Richard M. Sherman; Robert B. Sherman

"Sister Suffragette" is a pro-suffrage protest song written and composed by Richard M. Sherman and Robert B. Sherman (a duo known as the Sherman Brothers). It was sung by actress Glynis Johns in the role of Mrs. Winifred Banks in the 1964 Disney film Mary Poppins. The song's melody was originally from a scrapped piece called "Practically Perfect", also written and composed by the Sherman Brothers.

The lyrics mention Emmeline Pankhurst, who with her daughters Christabel and Sylvia founded the Women's Social and Political Union in Manchester, England. Some of the words are: "Our daughters' daughters will adore us, and they'll sing in grateful chorus, well done, Sister Suffragette!"

== Original version ==
The melody of "Sister Suffragette" was borrowed from an earlier song entitled "Practically Perfect", which had already been deleted from the 1964 film production. According to the songwriters in their autobiographical book, Walt's Time, actress Glynis Johns thought she was being offered the title role of "Mary Poppins" when in fact she had been signed to play "Mrs. Banks". To amplify Disney's and Johns' mutual embarrassment, the misunderstanding only became apparent as both parties sat opposite each other in Walt Disney's Burbank studio-lot office. Thinking quickly, Disney softened Johns' disappointment of not getting the film's title role by telling her of the 'terrific new song' which the Sherman Brothers had written especially for her. Disney called up the songwriters to tell them that he was "just about to take Johns to lunch and how she was looking forward to hearing the new song following the meal", all within earshot of the actress. The Sherman Brothers deciphered Disney's coded hint, worked feverishly through their own lunch hour, and wrote "Sister Suffragette". For instance, the original lyric:

I'm Practically Perfect in every way
In ev'rything I do and in everything I say

Quickly evolved into:

We're clearly soldiers in petticoats
Dauntless crusaders for women's votes!

The 2004 Mary Poppins stage musical contains a song titled "Practically Perfect" which, while being heavily based on the original, contains none of the tune. The replacement song is instead called "Being Mrs. Banks".

== Literary sources ==
- Sherman, Robert B. Walt's Time: from before to beyond. Santa Clarita: Camphor Tree Publishers, 1998.
