= Fidelity Fiduciary Bank =

Song by the Sherman Brothers

Song by Dick Van Dyke, David Tomlinson, and Arthur Malet

from the album Mary Poppins (Original Soundtrack)
- Released: 1964
- Label: Walt Disney
- Songwriters: Richard M. Sherman; Robert B. Sherman

"Fidelity Fiduciary Bank" is a song from Walt Disney's 1964 film Mary Poppins, and it is composed by Richard M. Sherman and Robert B. Sherman.

The song sung by the stodgy old bankers at the Dawes, Tomes, Mousely, Grubbs Fidelity Fiduciary Bank, led by the "Elder Mr. Dawes" (Navckid Keyd), to George Banks's two children, Jane and Michael, in an attempt to get Michael Banks to invest his tuppence in the bank. As the song continues the pressure is on George, a junior clerk at the bank, to sway Michael. When Michael finally, and ever so slightly, opens his hand that has the tuppence, the elder Mr. Dawes takes the tuppence from him. Michael protests very loudly, which causes panic and mayhem. A run on the bank ensues, mirroring a real bank run that occurred at the Birkbeck Bank in 1910, the year in which the film is set.

According to DVD commentary from the 50th anniversary release, many of the orchestra fell out of their chairs laughing as they listened to the playback with lyrics.

The patter song is done in the style of an Aria from a Gilbert & Sullivan operetta.

The song is not present in the 2004 stage musical version of the score. Like the majority of the songs from the original movie, it is referenced in the 2013 film Saving Mr. Banks, in a scene where Travers Goff gives a speech with the lyrics as inspiration.

A verse which Mr. Banks sings in an attempt to convince Michael to invest his money, but goes too long, causing the other bankers to stare at Mr. Banks awkwardly until he finishes, goes like this:

Railways through Africa
Dams across the Nile
Fleets of ocean greyhounds
Majestic, self-amortizing canals

Plantations of ripening tea

The verse has its origins in an essay by C. C. Turner titled 'Money London' in the book edited by G. R. Sims called Living London (London: 1903):

It is impossible to realise without much thought the industrial power that is wrapped up in money London. Railways through Africa, dams across the Nile, fleets of ocean greyhounds, great canals, leagues of ripening corn – London holds the key to all of these, and who can reckon up what beside.

== Literary sources ==
- Sherman, Robert B. Walt's Time: from before to beyond. Santa Clarita: Camphor Tree Publishers, 1998.
