= I Love to Laugh =

Song by the Sherman Brothers

Song by Dick Van Dyke, Ed Wynn and Julie Andrews

from the album Mary Poppins: Original Cast Soundtrack
- Released: 1964
- Label: Walt Disney
- Songwriter(s): The Sherman Brothers

"I Love to Laugh", also called "We Love to Laugh", is a song from Walt Disney's 1964 film Mary Poppins which was composed by Richard M. Sherman and Robert B. Sherman. The song is sung in the film by "Uncle Albert" (Ed Wynn), and "Bert" (Dick Van Dyke) as they levitate uncontrollably toward the ceiling, eventually joined by Mary Poppins (Julie Andrews) herself. The premise of the scene, that laughter and happiness cause Uncle Albert (and like-minded visitors) to float into the air, can be seen as a metaphor for the way laughter can "lighten" a mood. (Compare Peter Pan's flight power, which is also powered by happy thoughts.) Conversely, thinking of something sad literally brings Albert and his visitors "down to earth" again. The song states a case strongly in favor of laughter, even if Mary Poppins appears to disapprove of Uncle Albert's behavior, especially since it not only complicates the task of getting Albert down, but the infectious mood sends Bert and the Banks children into the air as well.

A snippet of the song plays again near the end of the film when Mr. Dawes Sr. (Dick Van Dyke) starts laughing from the "wooden leg named Smith" joke, and starts floating around the boardroom. It is later stated by his son (Arthur Malet) that he died while laughing.

The scene is based on the chapter "Laughing Gas" in the book Mary Poppins by P.L. Travers. In the book, Mary's Uncle Albert, also called Mr. Wigg, is said to float because of an excess of "laughing gas", although it is clear that the term is not used in the chemical sense.

This musical number also appears in the Sing-Along Songs series of Disney videos, though neither this song nor the Uncle Albert are featured in the 2004 stage musical version.

A parody called "We Love To Smoke", sung by Julie Kavner as Patty and Selma Bouvier, was intended to be used in the episode "Simpsoncalifragilisticexpiala(Annoyed Grunt)cious" of The Simpsons, but was cut from the episode. It appears on the album "Go Simpsonic with The Simpsons" as track 49.

== Literary sources ==
- Sherman, Robert B. (1998). Walt's Time: from before to beyond. Santa Clarita: Camphor Tree Publishers. ISBN 0-9646059-3-7.
