= Let's Go Fly a Kite =

Song by the Sherman Brothers

Song by David Tomlinson and Dick van Dyke

from the album Mary Poppins (Original Soundtrack)
- Released: 1964
- Label: Walt Disney
- Songwriters: Richard M. Sherman; Robert B. Sherman

"Let's Go Fly a Kite" is a song from Walt Disney's 1964 film Mary Poppins, composed by Richard M. Sherman and Robert B. Sherman. This song is performed at the end of the film when George Banks (played by David Tomlinson), realizes that his family is much more important than his job. He mends his son's kite and takes his family on a kite-flying outing. The song is sung by Tomlinson, Dick Van Dyke and eventually the entire chorus.

In keeping with Mr. Banks's change in character, this song was pre-recorded, and thus sung normally, by Tomlinson, rather than in his previous talk-singing in the Rex Harrison style, seen earlier in "The Life I Lead". This musical number also appears in the Sing Along Songs series of Disney videos.

== Development ==
Although the notion of Mary Poppins gliding down a kite is mentioned incidentally in one of the P.L. Travers books, the metaphor of the mended kite (being a symbol of the mended Banks family) is taken from the 1961 Sherman Brothers screenplay treatment. The song was inspired by the Sherman Brothers' father, Al Sherman, who besides being a well-known songwriter in his day was also an amateur kite maker who made kites for neighbourhood children as a weekend hobby.

The song was originally written in 4/4 or common time, but Walt Disney felt it was too much like the ending of a Broadway show and wanted a song that was more "breezy", like a waltz, so it was recrafted into a 3/4 waltz-like arrangement. The song starts in B-flat major and ends in F Major.

The song appears in the 2004 stage musical version as well, but closer to the middle of the show and not at the show's end. In this version, the scene recreates what happens at the beginning of the second book when Mary Poppins came back on the string of Michael's kite.

== Cover versions ==
On 6 April 2015 a version by Burl Ives featured on BBC's The One Show.

== Literary sources ==
- Sherman, Robert B. Walt's Time: from before to beyond. Santa Clarita: Camphor Tree Publishers, 1998.
