= The Perfect Nanny (song) =

Song by Karen Dotrice and Matthew Garber

from the album Mary Poppins (Original Soundtrack)
- Released: 1964
- Label: Walt Disney
- Songwriters: Richard M. Sherman; Robert B. Sherman

"The Perfect Nanny" is a song from Walt Disney's 1964 film Mary Poppins, and it is composed by Richard M. Sherman and Robert B. Sherman. This song is heard at the beginning of the film, and its theme is heard through the film as a leitmotif for the children. It is sung by the characters of Jane Banks (played by Karen Dotrice) and Michael Banks (played by Matthew Garber). It is a lyrical musicalization of a would-be newspaper advertisement, describing in the kids' words what they feel the qualifications are for a good caregiver, as opposed to the strict type of caregiver their father wants.

The song also appears in the Cameron Mackintosh 2004 musical stage production. The lyrics are unchanged but the music is more up-tempo than in the original Irwin Kostal arrangement.
