= The Life I Lead (song) =

Song by the Sherman Brothers

Song by David Tomlinson

from the album Mary Poppins (Original Soundtrack)
- Released: 1964
- Label: Walt Disney
- Songwriter(s): Richard M. Sherman; Robert B. Sherman

"The Life I Lead" is a song from the 1964 Walt Disney film Mary Poppins, composed by Richard M. Sherman and Robert B. Sherman. Music arranger Irwin Kostal used the theme from this song as the leitmotif of George Banks, as it most expresses the way he "marches" through life.

The song is first sung as George Banks (played by David Tomlinson) marches through the front door of his home, on "[his] return from daily strife to hearth and wife". The song is reprised several times throughout the film, with Julie Andrews also singing a verse. The final reprise is sung when Banks thinks he has lost everything. The music is now more somber and is retitled, "A Man Has Dreams".

- The lyrics of the song say:
  At 6:01, I march through my door, My slippers, sherry and pipe are due at 6:02, Consistent is the life I lead...

Lyricist Robert B. Sherman was making an inside comment about his own life. Having just secured a position with the Walt Disney Company, he also purchased a home in Beverly Hills, California. The house is located at 601 North Oakhurst Drive. In the lyric, 6:01 is a reference to time. In the songwriter's personal life, it was the address of his home. Although Sherman moved away from the house in 1969, years later a more recent owner put up a plaque which reads "Casa Poppins" because it was in that house that Sherman lived during the writing of Mary Poppins. The plaque is still at that location.

- An adaptation of this song called "Precision and Order" is evident in the stage musical version.
- It is through this song that the audience learns what year the story takes place. It is the only time it is mentioned in the film: "It's grand to be an Englishman in 1910 / King Edward's on the throne; it's the age of men!" The original books were set in 1934 but due to the film's great popularity, 1910 became the base point at which the stories took place. This new, preset date was later used to inform the 1930s setting of the 2018 sequel film, Mary Poppins Returns.

== Stage play ==
- The Life I Lead is a 2019 one-man comedy play written by James Kettle about David Tomlinson's life in which the title of the play refers to the song. The song is also sung in the play by Miles Jupp who plays Tomlinson.

== Literary sources ==
- Sherman, Robert B., Walt's Time: From Before to Beyond. Santa Clarita, CA: Camphor Tree Publishers, 1998.
- Sherman, Robert B., Moose: Chapters From My Life. Baltimore, MD: Orchard Hill Press, 2016.
