= Chim Chim Cher-ee =

1964 song by the Sherman Brothers

Song by Julie Andrews, Dick Van Dyke, Karen Dotrice and Matthew Garber

from the album Mary Poppins (Original Soundtrack)
- Released: 1964
- Label: Walt Disney
- Songwriters: Richard M. Sherman; Robert B. Sherman

"Chim Chim Cher-ee" is a song from Mary Poppins, the 1964 musical film, and is also featured in the 2004 Mary Poppins musical.

It won Best Original Song at the 37th Academy Awards. In 2005, Julie Andrews included this song as part of Julie Andrews Selects Her Favorite Disney Songs.

== Songwriters ==
The song was written by Robert B. Sherman and Richard M. Sherman (the "Sherman Brothers"), who also won an Oscar and a Grammy Award for the Mary Poppins score.

== Inspiration ==
The song was inspired by one of the drawings of a chimney sweep created by Mary Poppins screenwriter Don DaGradi. When the Sherman Brothers asked about the drawing, DaGradi explained the ancient British folklore attributed to "sweeps" and how shaking hands with one or touching their sleeve could bring a person good luck. In their 1961 treatment, the Sherman Brothers had already amalgamated many of the P. L. Travers characters in the creation of "Bert". His theme music became "Chim Chim Cher-ee".

In addition to the "standard" version of the song which Bert sings to the children, he sings short snippets of the song to himself at various times, with different verses specific to an unfolding plot element.

The "Mentsch" music group notes some similarities with a Yiddish song written by Itsik Manger named "Vaylu". The song also shares some sonic similarities to the Yiddish folksong, Tumbalalaika.

== Certifications ==
| Region | Certification | Certified units/sales |
|---|---|---|
| United States (RIAA) | Gold | 500,000^{‡} |
^{‡} Sales+streaming figures based on certification alone.

== Covers ==
- Burl Ives on the 1964 album Chim Chim Cheree And Other Children's Choices. (#6 RPM AC Canada)
- John Coltrane on the 1965 album The John Coltrane Quartet Plays.
- The Lower Third, an early David Bowie band, incorporated the song into their repertoire.
- Wes Montgomery on the 1966 album Goin Out of My Head.
- Charlie Byrd released on Italian series I giganti del Jazz.
- Bing Crosby (on his 1968 album Thoroughly Modern Bing).
- Duke Ellington released a complete Album with Mary Poppins songs, Duke Ellington Plays Mary Poppins.
- The Howard Roberts Quartet covered this song in 1965.
- The New Christy Minstrels on the 1965 album Chim Chim Cher-ee and Other Happy Songs (#7 RPM AC Canada)
- Mrs. Miller covered the song for her first Capitol Records album Mrs. Miller - Greatest Hits.
- The Tinseltown Players on the some various albums including Chim Chim Charee & Other Kiddie Favorites
- Alvin and the Chipmunks on the 1969 album The Chipmunks Go to the Movies
- Louis Armstrong on Disney Songs the Satchmo Way album.
- Rex Gildo, in German on 1965's Chim-Chim-Cheri
- Mannheim Steamroller on the 1999 album, Mannheim Steamroller Meets the Mouse.
- Pete Doherty performed this song live at the Meltdown festival in 2007.
- The Three D's covered it on a Capitol Records 45 rpm 1964 recording
- Joe Pernice (as "Chim Cheree") on the 2009 album It Feels So Good When I Stop.
- Esperanza Spalding on the 2010 album Everybody Wants To Be A Cat.
- Plastic Tree (in Japanese on the 2011 album V-Rock Disney
- Turin Brakes as a 2011 single, with all UK proceeds going to Shelter.
- On 2013 album Disney - Koe no Oujisama Vol.3, which features various Japanese voice actors covering Disney songs, this song was covered by Takuma Terashima.
- David Alan Grier in Amazon Women on the Moon.
- The Seldom Scene in the album Act3.
- An orchestral arrangement of the song was used in the 2021 Coca-Cola advertisement "Chimney".
- Kokia, as the first track of her cover album Watching from Above 2, released in 2019.

== Parodies ==
The song was parodied by song parodist Allan Sherman (no relation to the Sherman Brothers), using the same song title. The parody pokes fun at the American merchandise seen on TV commercials.

Supporters of English football teams, Birmingham City, Millwall, West Bromwich Albion and Blackburn Rovers, sing a version of the song which is a reference to each team's local rivals, West Ham, Aston Villa and Burnley, who all wear claret and blue shirts.

English comedian Tim Vine played on the lyrics to the song in the title of one of his stand-up DVDs, Tim Timinee, Tim Timinee, Tim Tim To You and on the cover it features Vine dressed up as a chimney sweep.
