= Mary Poppins (film) =

1964 musical fantasy comedy film

- Theatrical release poster by Paul Wenzel
- Directed by: Robert Stevenson
- Screenplay by: Bill Walsh; Don DaGradi
- Based on: Mary Poppins by P. L. Travers
- Produced by: Walt Disney
- Starring: Julie Andrews; Dick Van Dyke; David Tomlinson; Glynis Johns; Hermione Baddeley; Karen Dotrice; Matthew Garber; Elsa Lanchester; Arthur Treacher; Reginald Owen; Ed Wynn
- Cinematography: Edward Colman
- Edited by: Cotton Warburton
- Music by: Richard M. Sherman; Robert B. Sherman
- Production companies: Walt Disney Productions; Walt Disney Cartoons
- Distributed by: Buena Vista Distribution Company
- Release dates: August 27, 1964 (Los Angeles); September 24, 1964 (New York City)
- Running time: 139 minutes
- Country: United States
- Language: English
- Budget: $4.4–6 million
- Box office: $103 million

Mary Poppins is a 1964 American musical comedy film directed by Robert Stevenson and produced by Walt Disney, with songs written and composed by the Sherman Brothers. The screenplay is by Bill Walsh and Don DaGradi, based on P. L. Travers's book series Mary Poppins. The film, which combines live-action and animation, stars Julie Andrews, in her feature film debut, as Mary Poppins, who visits a dysfunctional family in London and employs her unique brand of lifestyle to improve the family's dynamic. Dick Van Dyke, David Tomlinson, and Glynis Johns are featured in supporting roles. The film was shot entirely at the Walt Disney Studios in Burbank, California, using painted London background scenes.

Mary Poppins was released on August 27, 1964, to universal critical acclaim and commercial success, earning $44 million in theatrical rentals in its original run. It became the highest-grossing film of 1964 in the United States, and at the time of its release became Disney's highest-grossing film. During its theatrical lifetime, it grossed over $103 million worldwide. It received a total of thirteen Academy Award nominations—a record for any film released by Walt Disney Studios and Walt Disney Cartoons—including Best Picture, and won five: Best Actress for Andrews, Best Film Editing, Best Original Music Score, Best Visual Effects, and Best Original Song for "Chim Chim Cher-ee". In 2013, it was selected for preservation in the United States National Film Registry by the Library of Congress as being "culturally, historically, or aesthetically significant."

A biographical drama based on the making of the film, Saving Mr. Banks, was released in 2013. A sequel to the original film, Mary Poppins Returns, was released in 2018.

== Plot ==
In 1910, Winifred Banks returns to her home in Edwardian London after a suffragette rally and learns that her children, Jane and Michael, have run away, "for the fourth time this week"; this has prompted their nanny, Katie Nanna, to quit her job ("Sister Suffragette"). That night, Winifred's strict and ambitious husband George returns home from his job at the bank ("The Life I Lead") and places a newspaper advertisement for a stern, no-nonsense nanny. Jane and Michael present their own advertisement for a kind, sympathetic nanny, ("The Perfect Nanny") but George rips up their letter and throws the scraps in the fireplace. A strong wind draws the scraps up through the chimney and into the sky.

The next day, several sour-faced nannies await outside the Banks family's home, but a strong gust of wind magically blows them away. Jane and Michael then witness a young woman floating down from the sky, gracefully descending with an open umbrella. The woman enters the Banks family's home and introduces herself as Mary Poppins. To George's shock, Mary is holding the children's advertisement, and the scraps have been put back together. She agrees with the advertisement's requests, but promises George that she will be firm with his children. Mary manipulates George into hiring her. Upstairs, Mary helps the children magically clean their nursery ("A Spoonful of Sugar").

While walking in a park, the trio encounters Mary's best friend Bert, a jack of all trades working as a street painter. Mary transports the group into one of Bert's drawings. While the children ride on a carousel, Mary and Bert sing while strolling ("Jolly Holiday"). After meeting up with the children, they all then participate in a horse race, which Mary wins. Mary uses the nonsense word "Supercalifragilisticexpialidocious" to describe her victory. When a thunderstorm dissolves Bert's drawings, the group is returned to London. While putting the children to bed, Mary sings a lullaby ("Stay Awake").

The next day, the trio and Bert visit Mary's odd uncle, Albert, whose uncontrollable laughter has caused him to float ("I Love to Laugh"). George becomes annoyed by the household's cheery atmosphere and threatens to fire Mary. She persuades him to take the children to his workplace. That evening, Mary tells the children about a woman who sells bird food on the steps of St. Paul's Cathedral ("Feed The Birds"). The next day at the bank, the children meet George's boss, the elderly Mr. Dawes Sr., who advises Michael to invest his tuppence in the bank, ultimately snatching the coins out of Michael's hand ("Fidelity Fiduciary Bank"). Michael demands them back; other customers overhear the conflict, and they all begin demanding their own money back, causing a bank run.

Jane and Michael flee the bank and get lost in the East End. Bert, now working as a chimney sweep, escorts them home. The three and Mary venture onto the rooftops ("Chim Chim Cher-ee") where Bert dances with other chimney sweeps ("Step In Time"). George later receives a phone call from the bank, requesting a meeting with him regarding Michael's actions. The children overhear the phone call and become concerned. Bert advises George to spend more time with Jane and Michael before they grow up ("A Man Has Dreams"). Hoping to make amends, Michael gives George the tuppence. Stricken with regret, George slowly walks through London to the bank, where he is given a humiliating cashiering. Lost for words, George exclaims "Supercalifragilisticexpialidocious", tells a joke Albert had told the children, and happily walks home. When Mr. Dawes Sr. understands the joke, he floats up into the air, laughing.

The next day, Mary Poppins tells the children she must leave. George mends his children's kite and takes the family out to fly it. At the park, the family encounters Mr. Dawes Sr.'s son, Mr. Dawes Jr., who reveals that his father died laughing at the joke. Mr. Dawes Jr. says his father had never been happier and gratefully rehires (and promotes) George ("Let's Go Fly A Kite"). Mary watches the family and decides her work is done. As Mary flies away, Bert looks up and says, "Goodbye, Mary Poppins. Don't stay away too long."

== Cast ==
=== Live-action cast ===
- Julie Andrews as Mary Poppins, a magical and loving woman who descends from the clouds in response to the Banks children's advertisement for a nanny. She is firm in her use of authority but gentle and kind as well, a major departure from the original books, in which the character was more stern and pompous.
- Dick Van Dyke as Bert, a cockney-speaking jack of all trades and Mary Poppins' closest friend, who is completely accustomed to her magic. Their playful interactions imply that they have known each other for a long time and that this kind of story has repeated itself many times. Bert has at least four jobs throughout the film: a one-man band, a sidewalk chalk artist, a chimney sweep, and a kite seller.
  - Van Dyke also portrays Mr. Dawes Sr., the old director of the bank where Mr. Banks works. During the film's end titles, "Navckid Keyd", an anagram of Dick Van Dyke, is first credited as playing the role before the letters unscramble to reveal Van Dyke's name.
- David Tomlinson as George Banks, Mary Poppins' employer and strict, driven, and disciplined father of Jane and Michael. He works at the Dawes Tomes Mousley Grubbs Fidelity Fiduciary Bank in London.
- Glynis Johns as Winifred Banks, the easily distracted wife of George Banks and the mother of Jane and Michael. She is depicted as a member of Emmeline Pankhurst's "Votes for Women" suffrage movement, although she is mild and subservient with her husband. Mrs. Banks was originally named Cynthia, but this was changed to the more English-sounding Winifred per Travers.
- Hermione Baddeley as Ellen, the maid of the Banks residence
- Reta Shaw as Mrs. Clara Brill, the cook of the Banks residence
- Karen Dotrice as Jane Banks, the daughter of Mr. and Mrs. Banks and Michael's older sister. Jane is a high-spirited, bright, and precocious young girl. Dotrice makes a cameo appearance in Mary Poppins Returns (2018) as a different character.
- Matthew Garber as Michael Banks, the son of Mr. and Mrs. Banks and Jane's younger brother. Michael is an excitable and naughty young boy who simply adores and looks up to his father. Both Jane and Michael are mischievous and misbehave in an attempt to seek attention from their parents.
- Elsa Lanchester as Katie Nanna, the disgruntled nanny who quits the Banks family
- Arthur Treacher as Constable Cody Jones, a police officer
- Reginald Owen as Admiral Boom, the Bankses' eccentric neighbor and a naval officer. He has his first mate, Mr. Binnacle, fire a cannon from his roof every 8 a.m. and 6 p.m.
- Ed Wynn as Uncle Albert, a jolly gentleman who suffers from an unknown condition where he floats in the air due to his uncontrollable laughter. Although he likes having company over, he becomes sad and cries when his guests have to leave and he falls back to the ground, since it is the inversion of laughing.
- Jane Darwell as the "Bird Woman", an old woman who sells breadcrumbs for the pigeons on the steps of St. Paul's Cathedral
- Arthur Malet as Mr. Dawes Jr., the director's son and member of the board
- James Logan as a doorman who chases after the children in the bank
- Don Barclay as Mr. Binnacle, Admiral Boom's first mate
- Alma Lawton as Mrs. Corry, an old shopkeeper of a gingerbread shop and mother of two very tall daughters
- Marjorie Eaton as Miss Molly Persimmon
- Marjorie Bennett as Miss Lark, owner of the dog named Andrew, who frequently runs away
- Cyril Delevanti as Mr. Grubbs (uncredited)
- Lester Matthews as Mr. Tomes (uncredited)
- Betty Lou Gerson as old crone (uncredited)
- Kay E. Kuter as man in bank (uncredited)
- Doris Lloyd as depositor (uncredited)
- Queenie Leonard as depositor (uncredited)

=== Voice cast ===
- Julie Andrews as Robin, Pearly Violinist, and the Bird Woman
- Marc Breaux as Cow
- Daws Butler as Penguin Waiter, Turtles
- Peter Ellenshaw as Penguin Waiter ("And Jane")
- Paul Frees as Barnyard Horse
- Bill Lee as Ram
- Jimmy MacDonald as animals
- Sean McClory as Bloodhound, Reporter #4
- Dallas McKennon as Fox, Bloodhound, Penguin Waiter, Horse, Carousel Guard
- Alan Napier as Old Huntsman, Reporter #3, Bloodhound
- Marni Nixon as Geese
- J. Pat O'Malley as Bloodhound, Master of Hounds, Hunting Horse #2, Pearly Drummer, Pearly Tambourinist, Penguin Waiter, Photographer, Reporter #2
- George Pelling as Bloodhound, Reporter #1
- Thurl Ravenscroft as Hog
- Richard M. Sherman as Penguin Waiter, Male Pearly
- Robert B. Sherman as Pearly Banjo Player
- David Tomlinson as Penguin Waiter, Jockey, Race Track Stewards, Mary Poppins' Parrot Umbrella
- Ginny Tyler as the Lambs
- Martha Wentworth as Cockney Cow

== Production ==
=== Development ===
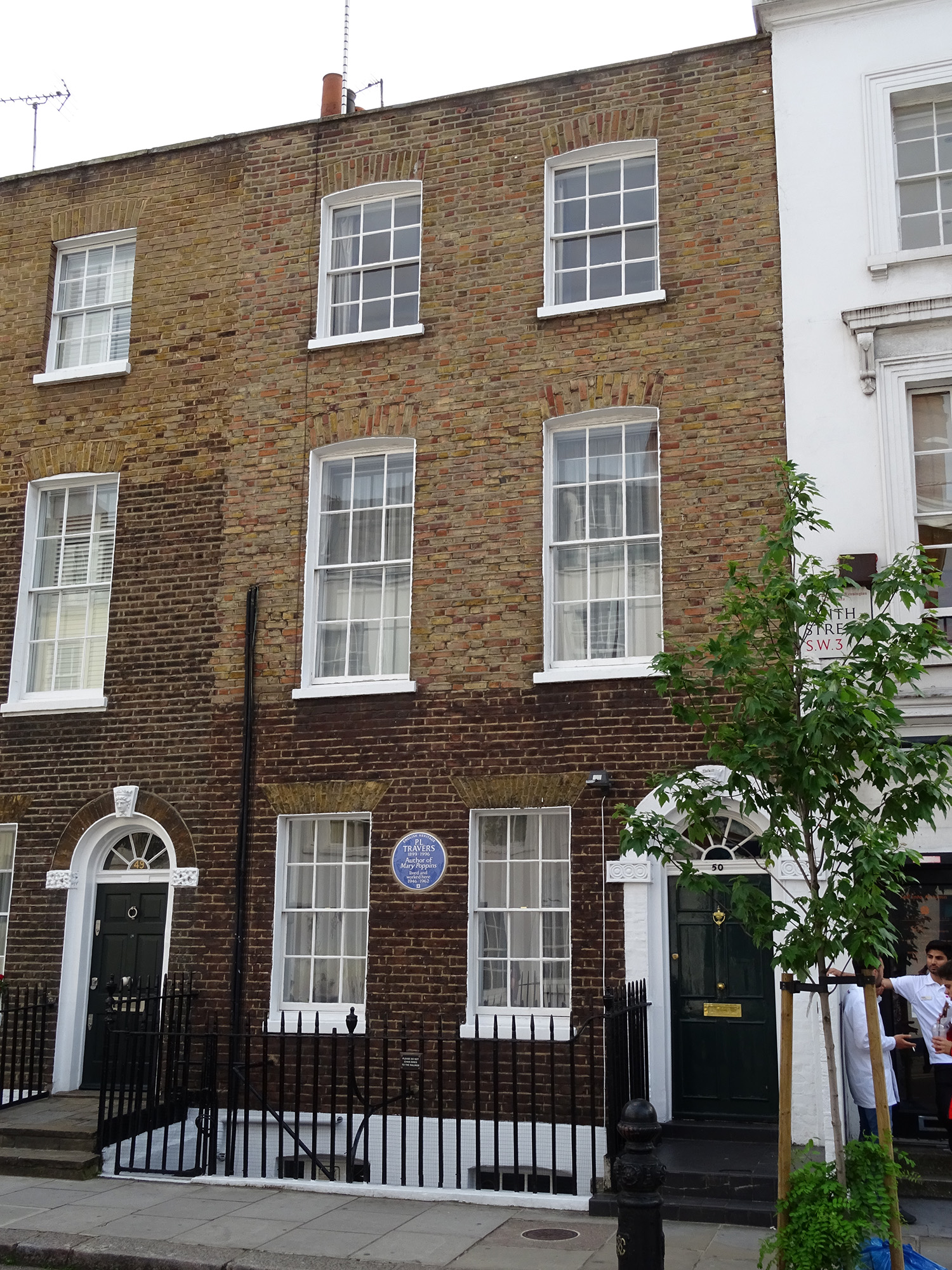
Walt Disney's efforts to obtain the rights to Mary Poppins included travelling to Travers' home in London (pictured).

The film's main basis was the first novel in the Mary Poppins series. According to the 40th Anniversary DVD release of the film in 2004, Disney's daughters fell in love with the Mary Poppins books and made Disney promise to make a film based on them. He first attempted to purchase the film rights from P. L. Travers as early as 1938, but Travers repeatedly refused; she did not believe a film version would do justice to her books.

Disney was also then known primarily as a producer of animated films, and had yet to produce a major live-action work. For more than 20 years, he made periodic efforts to convince Travers to release the rights, including visiting her home in Chelsea, London. He finally succeeded in 1961, although Travers demanded and obtained script-approval rights. The Sherman Brothers composed the music score and were involved in the film's development, suggesting the setting be changed from the 1930s to the Edwardian era. Pre-production and music creation took about two years.

=== Pre-production ===
Travers was an adviser to the production, and was billed as the film's consultant. However, she disapproved of the dilution of the harsher aspects of Mary Poppins' character, felt ambivalent about the music, and hated the use of animation so much that she ruled out any further adaptations of the later Mary Poppins novels. She objected to a number of elements that made it into the film. Rather than original songs, she wanted the soundtrack to feature known standards of the Edwardian period in which the story is set. However, due to contract stipulations citing that he had final cut privilege on the finished print, Disney overruled her. In a 2013 interview, Dick van Dyke said that Travers felt that neither he nor Julie Andrews were right for the lead roles.

Much of the Travers–Disney correspondence is part of the Travers collection of papers in the State Library of New South Wales, Australia. The relationship between Travers and Disney is detailed in Mary Poppins She Wrote, a biography of Travers by Valerie Lawson. The biography is the basis for two documentaries on Travers: The Real Mary Poppins and The Shadow of Mary Poppins. Their relationship during the development of the film was also dramatized in the 2013 Disney film Saving Mr. Banks.

=== Casting ===
In March 1961, Disney announced that it might cast Hayley Mills and Mary Martin in the film.

Julie Harris, Angela Lansbury, Bette Davis, Judy Garland, Barbara Eden, Elizabeth Taylor, Jayne Mansfield, Natalie Wood, and Elizabeth Montgomery were considered for the role of Mary Poppins. Actors considered for the role of Bert included Bert Convy, Sean Connery, Bob Denver, Adam West, Andy Williams, Cary Grant, Jamie Farr, and Andy Griffith. Before Ed Wynn was cast, Ray Bolger, Jack Haley, Bert Lahr, George Burns, Bob Hope, Jack Albertson, Jim Backus, Alan Hale Jr., Kirk Douglas, and Lorne Greene were considered for the role of Uncle Albert.

Julie Andrews, who was making her feature film acting debut after a successful stage career, was given the prime role of Mary Poppins soon after she was passed over by Jack L. Warner and replaced with Audrey Hepburn for the role of Eliza Doolittle in his screen adaptation of My Fair Lady, even though Andrews originated the role on Broadway. When Disney approached Andrews about playing Poppins, she was three months pregnant. Disney assured her that they were willing to postpone filming until she had given birth so that she could take the part. Disney considered actor Stanley Holloway for the role of Admiral Boom, but it went to Reginald Owen, due to Holloway's commitment to My Fair Lady.

Andrews also provided the voice in two other sections of the film: During "A Spoonful of Sugar", she provided the whistling harmony for the robin and she was also one of the Pearly singers during "Supercalifragilisticexpialidocious". David Tomlinson, besides playing Mr. Banks, provided the voices of Mary's talking umbrella, Admiral Boom's first mate, and numerous other voice-over parts. During the "Jolly Holiday" sequence, the three singing Cockney geese were all voiced by Marni Nixon, who regularly sang for actresses with substandard singing voices. (Nixon later provided the singing voice for Hepburn in My Fair Lady and played one of Andrews's fellow nuns in The Sound of Music.) Andrews later beat Hepburn for the Best Actress Award at the Golden Globes for their respective roles. Andrews also won the Oscar for Best Actress for her role (Hepburn was not nominated for it). Richard Sherman, one of the songwriters, also voiced a penguin and one of the Pearlies. Robert Sherman provided the speaking voice of Jane Darwell because Darwell's voice was too soft to be heard in the soundtrack. He is heard saying the only line: "Feed the birds, tuppence a bag."

Disney cast Dick Van Dyke in the main supporting role of Bert after seeing his work on The Dick Van Dyke Show. After winning the role, Van Dyke lobbied to also play the senior Mr. Dawes. Disney felt he was too young for the part, but Van Dyke won him over after a screen test. Van Dyke had trouble with Bert's Cockney accent. English character actor J. Pat O'Malley provided some coaching; but although Van Dyke is fondly remembered for the film, his attempt at a Cockney accent is considered one of the poorer accents in film history. (It was #2 in a 2003 poll by Empire magazine of the worst film accents.) Van Dyke claimed that O'Malley "didn't do an accent any better than I did". In 2017, Van Dyke received an award for television excellence from the British Academy of Film and Television Arts (BAFTA), at which time he said, "I appreciate this opportunity to apologise to the members of BAFTA for inflicting on them the most atrocious cockney accent in the history of cinema." A chief executive of BAFTA responded, "We look forward to his acceptance speech in whatever accent he chooses on the night. We have no doubt it will be 'supercalifragilisticexpialidocious'."

=== Filming ===
Filming took place between May and September 1963 in Burbank, California; post-production and animation took another eleven months.

The scene in which Mary Poppins and Bert interact with a group of animated penguins is noted for its use of the sodium vapor process. Rather than using the more common bluescreen process to insert the actors into the animated footage, the actors were filmed against a white screen lit with sodium vapor lights, which have a yellow hue. A special camera was fitted with a prism that filtered this light to a separate reel of film, creating a highly accurate matte that could be used to isolate the actors from the background. This created a crisp, clean image and even allowed the partially transparent veil of Mary Poppins's costume to let through light from the background. The film received the Academy Award for Best Visual Effects in 1965 for this effect.

Peter Menefee, one of the 12 dancing chimney sweeps supporting Bert, provided some insight into the film's choreography:

The choreography wasn't really done until we got there and they mounted it on us. On the first day of filming, the first thing we shot is the very last thing you see – where we're all dancing down the street at the end. That was hard because, although we had worked for almost a month and a half with the brooms and everything, we'd been working on a plywood floor. And all of a sudden, we get out and we're on a cobblestone street and there's supposed to be four of us tumbling right next to each other, and you put the broom down. Even if it had a rubber point, you'd be all over the place. That was really hard.

The film's choreographers were Dee Dee Wood and her husband Marc Breaux. Walt Disney attended the rehearsals for the rooftop scenes every day.

== Music ==
The film features music and lyrics by brothers Richard M. Sherman and Robert B. Sherman, who took inspiration from Edwardian British music hall music. Irwin Kostal arranged and conducted the score. Buena Vista Records released the original soundtrack in 1964 on LP and reel-to-reel tape. Even though RCA Victor Records released a record club edition, it is considered the pivotal release for Disney's in-house record division, selling in the millions. The songs were among the most covered by famous artists such as Johnny Mathis, Louis Prima, and Ray Conniff, and even cartoon characters such as The Chipmunks and The Flintstones.

== Release ==
Mary Poppins premiered on August 27, 1964, at Grauman's Chinese Theatre in Los Angeles. The film's poster was painted by artist Paul Wenzel. Travers was not extended an invitation to the event, but managed to obtain one from a Disney executive. It was at the after-party that Richard Sherman recalled her walking up to Disney and loudly announcing that the animated sequence had to go. Disney responded, "Pamela, the ship has sailed" and walked away.

=== Home media ===
Mary Poppins was released in the early 1980s on several home media formats, Betamax, CED and LaserDisc and VHS. The first VHS release in December 1980 features a cover with Mary Poppins flying with her umbrella. The second release in November 1982 has a cropped image of Mary, Bert, and the Children from the "Stepintime" roof dance fireworks scene, while the third release on November 6, 1985, has a full-length picture on its cover. The fourth and final release, on October 4, 1988, as part of the Walt Disney Home Video collection, features the Penguin dance. On October 28, 1994, August 26, 1997, and March 31, 1998, it was rereleased three times as part of the Walt Disney Masterpiece Collection. In 1998, the film became Disney's first feature film released on DVD. On July 4, 2000, it was released on VHS and DVD as part of the Gold Classic Collection. On December 14, 2004, it had a 2-disc DVD release in a Digitally Restored 40th Anniversary Edition as well as its final issue in the VHS format. The film's audio track featured an "Enhanced Home Theater Mix" consisting of updated sound effects, improved fidelity and mixing, and some enhanced music (this version was also shown on its 2006–2012 ABC Family airings), but the DVD included the original soundtrack as an audio option.

On January 27, 2009, the film was rereleased on DVD as a 45th anniversary edition, with more language tracks and special features (though the film's "Enhanced Home Theater Mix" was not included). Walt Disney Studios Home Entertainment released it on Blu-ray as the 50th Anniversary Edition on December 10, 2013.

In February 2024, the British Board of Film Classification reclassified Mary Poppins from U to a PG due to Admiral Boom's use of the word "hottentot" to refer to the dancing chimney sweeps.

== Reception ==
=== Box office ===
Mary Poppins earned $31 million in theatrical rentals in the United States and Canada during its initial run. It was one of the top 12 grossing films in the United States for 32 weeks. It earned rentals of $44 million worldwide in its initial release.

The film was re-released theatrically in 1973, in honor of Walt Disney Productions' 50th anniversary, and earned an estimated additional $9 million in rentals in the United States and Canada. It was released once more in 1980 and grossed $14 million. It returned a total lifetime rental of $45 million in the United States and Canada to Disney from a gross of over $102 million.

It was the 20th most popular sound film of the 20th century in the United Kingdom with admissions of 14 million.

The film was very profitable for Disney. Made on an estimated budget of $4.4–6 million, it was reported by Cobbett Steinberg to be the most profitable film of 1965, earning a net profit of $28.5 million. (Note: When a film is released late in a calendar year (October–December), its income is reported in the following year's compendium, unless the film made a particularly fast impact.) Walt Disney used his huge profits from the film to purchase land in central Florida and finance the construction of Walt Disney World.

=== Critical response ===
The film received universal acclaim from critics. Whitney Williams of Variety praised its musical sequences and Andrews' and Van Dyke's performances in particular. Time lauded the film, stating, "The sets are luxuriant, the songs lilting, the scenario witty but impeccably sentimental, and the supporting cast only a pinfeather short of perfection." Bosley Crowther, reviewing for The New York Times, described the film as a "most wonderful, cheering movie … for the visual and aural felicities they have added to this sparkling color film—the enchantments of a beautiful production, some deliciously animated sequences, some exciting and nimble dancing and a spinning musical score—make it the nicest entertainment that has opened at the Music Hall this year."

For The Hollywood Reporter, James Powers applauded the performances, visual effects, musical score, production design, and choreography, and commented: "Mary Poppins is a picture that is, more than most, a triumph of many individual contributions. And its special triumph is that it seems to be the work of a single, cohesive intelligence." Ann Guerin of Life criticized the creative departures from the novels, particularly the "Jolly Holiday" sequence. She noted that "[s]ome of the sequences have real charm, and perhaps the kids will eat them up. But speaking as a grownup, I found a little bit went a long way." She concluded, "With a little more restraint and a little less improvement on the original, the film's many charms would have been that much better."

On the review aggregator website Rotten Tomatoes, the film holds an approval rating of 95% based on 57 reviews, with an average rating of 8.5/10. The website's critics consensus reads, "A lavish modern fairy tale celebrated for its amazing special effects, catchy songs, and Julie Andrews's legendary performance in the title role." Metacritic, which uses a weighted average, assigned the film a score of 88 out of 100, based on 13 critics, indicating "universal acclaim". Critic Drew Casper summarized the impact of Mary Poppins in 2011:

Disney was the leader, his musical fantasies mixing animation and truly marvelous f/x with real-life action for children and the child in the adult. Mary Poppins (1964) was his plum. ... the story was elemental, even trite. But utmost sophistication (the chimney pot sequence crisply cut by Oscared "Cotton" Warburton) and high-level invention (a tea party on the ceiling, a staircase of black smoke to the city's top) characterized its handling.

== Accolades ==
List of awards and nominations
Award	Date of ceremony	Category	Recipients and nominees	Result	Ref.
Academy Awards	April 5, 1965	Best Picture	Walt Disney and Bill Walsh	Nominated	
Academy Awards	April 5, 1965	Best Director	Robert Stevenson	Nominated	
Academy Awards	April 5, 1965	Best Actress	Julie Andrews	Won	
Academy Awards	April 5, 1965	Best Adapted Screenplay	Bill Walsh and Don DaGradi	Nominated	
Academy Awards	April 5, 1965	Best Art Direction – Color	Art Direction: Carroll Clark and William H. Tuntke; Set Decoration: Emile Kuri and Hal Gausman	Nominated	
Academy Awards	April 5, 1965	Best Cinematography – Color	Edward Colman	Nominated	
Academy Awards	April 5, 1965	Best Costume Design – Color	Tony Walton	Nominated	
Academy Awards	April 5, 1965	Best Film Editing	Cotton Warburton	Won	
Academy Awards	April 5, 1965	Best Music Score – Substantially Original	Richard M. Sherman and Robert B. Sherman	Won	
Academy Awards	April 5, 1965	Best Scoring of Music – Adaptation or Treatment	Irwin Kostal	Nominated	
Academy Awards	April 5, 1965	Best Song	"Chim Chim Cher-ee"; Music and Lyrics by Richard M. Sherman and Robert B. Sherman	Won	
Academy Awards	April 5, 1965	Best Sound	Robert O. Cook	Nominated	
Academy Awards	April 5, 1965	Best Special Visual Effects	Peter Ellenshaw, Eustace Lycett and Hamilton Luske	Won	
British Academy Film Awards	1965	Most Promising Newcomer to Leading Film Roles	Julie Andrews	Won	
Directors Guild of America Awards	1965	Outstanding Directorial Achievement in Motion Pictures	Robert Stevenson	Nominated	
Golden Globe Awards	February 8, 1965	Best Motion Picture – Musical or Comedy		Nominated	
Golden Globe Awards	February 8, 1965	Best Actor in a Motion Picture – Musical or Comedy	Dick Van Dyke	Nominated	
Golden Globe Awards	February 8, 1965	Best Actress in a Motion Picture – Musical or Comedy	Julie Andrews	Won	
Golden Globe Awards	February 8, 1965	Best Original Score – Motion Picture	Richard M. Sherman and Robert B. Sherman	Nominated	
Grammy Awards	April 13, 1965	Best Recording for Children	Mary Poppins: Original Cast Soundtrack; Julie Andrews, Dick Van Dyke, Glynis Johns, David Tomlinson and Ed Wynn	Won	
Grammy Awards	April 13, 1965	Best Original Score Written for a Motion Picture or Television Show	Mary Poppins: Original Cast Soundtrack; Richard M. Sherman and Robert B. Sherman	Won	
Las Vegas Film Critics Society Awards	2005	Best DVD (packaging, content and transfer)	Mary Poppins: 40th Anniversary Edition	Won	
Laurel Awards	1965	Best Female Supporting Performance	Glynis Johns	Won	
New York Film Critics Circle Awards	January 23, 1965	Best Actress	Julie Andrews	Nominated	
Online Film & Television Association Awards	2013	Hall of Fame – Motion Picture		Inducted	
Online Film & Television Association Awards	2021	Hall of Fame – Characters	Mary Poppins	Inducted	
Online Film & Television Association Awards	2021	Hall of Fame – Songs	"Supercalifragilisticexpialidocious"	Inducted	
Writers Guild of America Awards	1965	Best Written American Musical	Bill Walsh and Don DaGradi	Won	

== Legacy ==
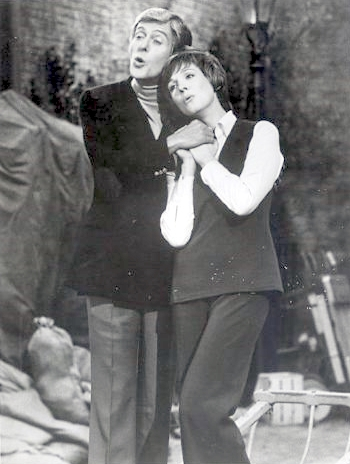
Julie Andrews and Dick Van Dyke were reteamed in the TV-movie Julie and Dick at Covent Garden (1974), directed by Julie's husband Blake Edwards.

Mary Poppins is widely considered Walt Disney's "crowning achievement". It was the only Disney film to receive a Best Picture nomination in his lifetime.

Some of the profits from the film were used to build the Walt Disney World Monorail System; reflecting this is the MAPO (MAry POppins) safety system included on all Disney monorails. Walt Disney World's Railroad steam locomotives are also fitted with a boiler safety device marked MAPO.

Never at ease with the handling of her property by Disney or the way she felt she had been treated, P.L. Travers, the original author, never agreed to another Poppins/Disney adaptation. So fervent was her dislike of the Disney adaptation, and of how she felt she had been treated during the production, that when producer Cameron Mackintosh approached her about the stage musical in the 1990s, she acquiesced on the conditions that he use only English-born writers and that no one from the film production be directly involved.

=== American Film Institute ===
- AFI's 100 Years ... 100 Songs:
  - "Supercalifragilisticexpialidocious" – #36
- AFI's 100 Years of Musicals – #6

=== TV airings ===
The ABC television network currently owns the broadcast rights to the film. It most recently aired on November 27, 2025, which was preceded the previous day by a 20/20 special about the making of the film, "The Untold Story of Mary Poppins", featuring previously unreleased production footage.

The documentary includes conversations with Dick Van Dyke, Josh Gad, Lin-Manuel Miranda, and Walt Disney's grandchildren. Julie Andrews also shared her memories of creating the original film.

On December 13, 2025, the film made its debut on TCM in commemoration of Dick Van Dyke turning 100 years old.

== Sequel ==
On December 19, 2018, Walt Disney Pictures released the sequel Mary Poppins Returns. The film takes place 25 years after the original, and features a standalone narrative based on the remaining seven books in the series. Rob Marshall directed, while John DeLuca and Marc Platt served as producers, with Emily Blunt starring as Poppins, co-starring Broadway actor Lin-Manuel Miranda. Dick Van Dyke returned to portray Mr. Dawes Jr. Karen Dotrice also appeared in a cameo role.

== In popular culture ==
- Two episodes of Gilligan's Island reference the film. In the episode "The Hunter", Ginger says "Are you Mary Ann or Mary Poppins?" In "And Then There Were None," Gilligan dreams he is on trial with Mary Poppins as his lawyer.
- In Neil Simon's film version of The Odd Couple (1968), Oscar Madison (Walter Matthau) says to his friends, "You get this one stinkin' night a week. I'm cooped up here with Mary Poppins twenty-four hours a day" (referring to Felix Unger (Jack Lemmon).
- The film inspired the eighth season episode of The Simpsons titled "Simpsoncalifragilisticexpiala(Annoyed Grunt)cious", featuring a parody of Mary called "Shary Bobbins" who helps out the Simpson family after Marge loses her hair due to stress, and spoofs of the songs "The Perfect Nanny", "A Spoonful of Sugar", "Feed the Birds" and "The Life I Lead".
- In Season 3 Episode 4 of The Dick Van Dyke Show, Buddy Sorrell (Morey Amsterdam) is brainstorming about ideas for The Alan Brady Show and says, "how about if Alan comes out as a cockney chimney sweep but he is getting so fat he can't get down the chimney." Since the episode's air date (October 16, 1963) was after Mary Poppins finished filming (in September 1963) but before the film premiered (in 1964), this was both a wink to those behind the scenes who knew Mary Poppins was on the way and a nod to the character Dick Van Dyke plays in the movie.
- In The Baby-Sitters Club books, Stacey takes a group of children on a shambolic outing to the Embassy Theatre to see Mary Poppins.
- The penguin waiters and a silhouette of Mary Poppins appeared in Who Framed Roger Rabbit, although the same penguins also appear by themselves on House of Mouse and Once Upon a Studio.
- In Gamera: Guardian of the Universe, Asagi Kusanagi has a poster of Mary Poppins in her bedroom.
- In The Boss Baby, the titular character refers to Euguena the babysitter as "Scary Poppins" upon being captured along with his brother, Tim.
- In Guardians of the Galaxy Vol. 2, Peter Quill tells Yondu Udonta that he looks like Mary Poppins, and then, Yondu Udonta yells, "I'm Mary Poppins, y'all!"

== See also ==
- List of American films of 1964

== Bibliography ==
- Brody, Paul (February 20, 2013). The Real Life Mary Poppins: The Life and Times of P. L. Travers. BookCaps Study Guides. ISBN 978-1-62107-482-3.
- Casper, Drew (March 1, 2011). Hollywood Film 1963–1976: Years of Revolution and Reaction. John Wiley & Sons. ISBN 978-1-4443-9523-5.
- Grilli, Giorgia (October 18, 2013). Myth, Symbol, and Meaning in Mary Poppins. Taylor & Francis. ISBN 978-1-135-86801-7.
- Hillier, Jim; Pye, Doug (May 24, 2011). 100 Film Musicals. Palgrave Macmillan. ISBN 978-1-84457-568-8.
- Lawson, Valerie (December 3, 2013). Mary Poppins, She Wrote: The Life of P. L. Travers. Simon and Schuster. ISBN 978-1-4767-6292-0.
- Marshall, Bill; Stilwell, Robynn Jeananne (January 1, 2000). Musicals: Hollywood and Beyond. Intellect Books. ISBN 978-1-84150-003-4.
- Mayhall, Laura E. Nym (1999). "Domesticating Emmeline: Representing the Suffragette, 1930-1993". NWSA Journal. 11 (2). The Johns Hopkins University Press: 1–24. doi:10.1353/nwsa.1999.0016. ISSN 1040-0656. JSTOR 4316653.
- Müller, Jürgen (2004). Movies of the 60s. Taschen. ISBN 978-3-8228-2799-4.
- Pearce, Sharyn (2015). "The business of myth-making: 'Mary Poppins', P.L. Travers and the Disney effect". Queensland Review. 22 (1): 62–74. doi:10.1017/qre.2015.6. ISSN 2049-7792.
- Steinberg, Cobbett (1980). Film Facts. New York: Facts on File. ISBN 978-0-87196-313-0.
- Stevenson, Ana (2018). ""Cast Off the Shackles of Yesterday": Women's Suffrage in Walt Disney's Mary Poppins". Camera Obscura: Feminism, Culture, and Media Studies. 33 (2): 69–103. doi:10.1215/02705346-6923118. ISSN 0270-5346.
- Szumsky, Brian E (2000). ""All That Is Solid Melts into the Air": The Winds of Change and Other Analogues of Colonialism in Disney's Mary Poppins". The Lion and the Unicorn. 24 (1): 97–109. doi:10.1353/uni.2000.0012. ISSN 1080-6563.
- Williams, Pat; Denney, James (August 1, 2004). How to Be Like Walt: Capturing the Disney Magic Every Day of Your Life. Health Communications, Inc. ISBN 978-0-7573-0231-2.
