= Feed the Birds =

Song written by the Sherman Brothers

Song by Julie Andrews

from the album Mary Poppins (Original Soundtrack)
- Released: 1964
- Label: Walt Disney
- Songwriters: Richard M. Sherman; Robert B. Sherman

"Feed the Birds" is a song written by the Sherman Brothers (Richard M. Sherman & Robert B. Sherman) and featured in the 1964 motion picture Mary Poppins. The song speaks of an old woman (the "Bird Woman") who sits on the steps of St Paul's Cathedral, selling bags of breadcrumbs to passers-by for two pence a bag so that they can feed the many pigeons which surround her. The scene is reminiscent of the real-life seed vendors of Trafalgar Square who began selling birdseed to passers-by shortly after its public opening in 1844.

In the book, Mary Poppins accompanies the children, on the way to tea with their father, to give money to the bird woman to feed the birds. In the movie, on the way to the bank, their father discourages the children from feeding the birds, while Mary Poppins, who had sung the song to the children the previous night, was on her day off. Academy Award winner Jane Darwell played the Bird Woman, her last screen appearance.

== Use and placement ==
In contrast to the energetic nature of most of the film's songs, "Feed the Birds" is played in a reverent tempo. This most serious of songs is used to frame the truly important moments in a film that is mostly humorous and lighthearted. It is used in four places:

- The first appearance is in the orchestral segment at the beginning of the film's overture medley, thus starting the overture slowly. The overture then segues into some of the faster pieces in the film's score.
- The second appearance comes when Mary Poppins sings the song to the children as a sweet lullaby on the night before their trip to the bank. It begins with Mary showing them a water-filled snow globe of St. Paul's, whose "snowflakes" are in the shape of the many birds flying around the cathedral. While the children sit and listen with rapt attention, scenes cut away to dreamlike imagery of the cathedral and of the bird woman, with parts of the song accompanied by an off-screen choir and orchestra.
- The third appearance is the evening of the trip to the bank, a very short segment about half a minute before the other sweeps appear in the chimney sweep sequence.
- The fourth appearance is also during the same evening, a dramatic orchestral and choral rendition, as a sombre and thoughtful Mr. Banks walks to his place of employment, literally and figuratively alone in the streets of London, stopping by the place where the bird woman was earlier that day (and on the previous night), only to find it vacant before continuing on to the bank to face its board of directors to be fired. The scene, deliberately designed to suggest the bird woman may have died, is one of the most dramatic scenes in the film. It segues into a short dirge-like segment as Mr. Banks reaches the door.

In 1988 Garth Hudson recorded "Feed the Birds" on Stay Awake: Various Interpretations of Music from Vintage Disney Films, produced by Hal Willner. The song is also alluded to in the Disney film Enchanted, a tribute to and parody of Disney films, in the form of an old woman named Clara who sells bird feed for "two dollars a bag"; in Chris Columbus's 1992 movie Home Alone 2: Lost in New York by the character known as the Pigeon Lady (interpreted by Academy Award Winner Brenda Fricker) and John Williams's soundtrack theme; and in the 2007 satirical comedy The Nanny Diaries. Cynthia A. Morgan, award-winning author and Inspiration coach, related how the song shaped her life.

== Initial reactions ==
As the Sherman Brothers recall, when Richard Sherman first played and sang "Feed the Birds" to Pamela Travers (the author of the Mary Poppins books), she thought it was "nice" but inappropriate for a male voice. Robert Sherman then called in a Disney staff secretary to demonstrate the song again. Upon hearing a woman sing the song, Ms. Travers' response was that she thought "Greensleeves" (traditionally in E minor, the same key as about half of "Feed The Birds") was the only truly appropriate song for the soundtrack, as it was "quintessentially English". (Ms. Travers had originally wanted the only music in the film to be Edwardian era songs.) Eventually and reluctantly, Travers acquiesced to the American songwriters' supplying the film's soundtrack.

Robert Sherman recalled:

On Fridays, after work, [Walt Disney would] often invite us into his office and we'd talk about things that were going on at the Studio. After a while, he'd wander to the north window, look out into the distance and just say, "Play it." And Dick would wander over to the piano and play "Feed the Birds" for him. One time just as Dick was almost finished, under his breath, I heard Walt say, "Yep. That's what it's all about."

The song was regarded as one of Walt Disney's favorite songs. Sherman also comments:

Songs have been written about a myriad of subjects. 'Feed the Birds' is the first song written about the merits of giving charity.

Tony Brown related additional Sherman comments about the song and its role in Mary Poppins:

... [w]e seized on one incident, in Chapter 7 of 'Mary Poppins Comes Back', the second book -- the bird woman. And we realized that was the metaphor for why Mary came, to teach the children -- and Mr. Banks -- the value of charity. So we wrote the song and took it up to Walt's office and played it and sang it for him. He leaned back in his chair, looking out the window, and he said: 'That's it, isn't it? That's what this is all about. This is the metaphor for the whole film.' And that was the turning point in our lives ... We were full-time staff, so we had an office at the studio, and every so often Walt would call us up to his office on a Friday afternoon. We knew what he wanted. When we got there, he would say, 'I just wanted to know what you boys were up to these days.' Then he would turn around in his chair and stare out the window, like the first time we played it for him, and he would say, 'Play it.' And we would ... And you could just see Walt thinking, 'That's what it's all about, everything we do at Disney.'

Walt Disney World and Richard Sherman's son Gregg concurred with Brown's account. However, "The Bird Woman" was chapter 7 in the first book, Mary Poppins, not in the second book, Mary Poppins Comes Back.

The song was sung by the movie's star Julie Andrews to visuals of the elderly bird woman of the song. Walt Disney himself made the unusual request that the bird woman, though a non-speaking part (except for one line, stating the first line of the song's chorus) be a cameo by one of his favorite character actresses, Jane Darwell. In her mid-eighties and semi-retired from acting (though she took television episodic guest appearances about once per year), Darwell had recently moved into the Motion Picture Country Home because of her advanced age and feebleness. Needing neither the money nor the screen credit, she declined the role. Walt Disney, still insistent, personally drove to the retirement home to plead with her. Charmed and flattered that she was so wanted, she agreed to take the part. Disney later sent a limousine to bring her to the studio. It was her last screen appearance or acting role; her only spoken line had to be re-recorded later by screenwriter/producer Bill Walsh, as her own voice was too weak.

== Walt Disney Centennial tale ==
Richard Sherman was invited to "help dedicate the Walt Disney statue at Disneyland" (the Partners statue of Mickey and Walt holding hands, at the Magic Kingdom) at Disney's Centennial celebration. Sherman was asked to play some songs, and so he did. Before playing the last song, Sherman said: "Now, I'll play Walt Disney's favorite song... and it's just for him", and he played "Feed The Birds". Sherman was told afterwards that "just towards the end of the song, out of the blue sky one bird flew down where he was playing, and then back into the clouds". Sherman believed that it was Walt Disney and got emotional when remembering the event.
