= Supercalifragilisticexpialidocious =

Song from the 1964 Mary Poppins film

- 1964 US single

Single by Julie Andrews and Dick Van Dyke

from the album Mary Poppins: Original Cast Soundtrack
- B-side: "A Spoonful of Sugar"
- Released: 1964
- Recorded: 1963
- Genre: Musical, show tune
- Length: 2:03
- Label: Disneyland
- Songwriter: Sherman Brothers

Audio
- "Supercalifragilisticexpialidocious" on YouTube

"Supercalifragilisticexpialidocious" (/ˌsuː.pər.ˌkæ.lɪ.ˌfræ.dʒɪ.ˌlɪs.tɪk.ˌɛks.pi.ˌæ.lɪ.ˈdoʊ.ʃəs/) is a song and single from the 1964 Disney musical film Mary Poppins. It was written by the Sherman Brothers, and sung by Julie Andrews and Dick Van Dyke. It also appears in the 2004 stage show version. Because Mary Poppins was a period piece set in 1910, songs that sounded similar to songs of the period were wanted. The movie version finished at #36 in AFI's 100 Years...100 Songs survey of top tunes in American cinema.

== Story context ==
The song occurs in the chalk-drawing outing animated sequence, just after Mary Poppins wins a horse race. Flush with her victory, she is immediately surrounded by reporters who pepper her with questions and suggest that she is at a loss for words. Mary disagrees, saying that at least one word is appropriate for the situation, and begins the song with this very word.

== Word meaning and general origin ==
The word is a compound word, and said by Richard Lederer in his book Crazy English to be made up of these words: super- (above), -cali- (beauty), -fragilistic- (delicate), -expiali- (to atone), and -docious (educable), with all of these parts combined meaning "atoning for being educable through delicate beauty".

The Oxford English Dictionary first records the word (with a spelling of "supercaliflawjalisticexpialadoshus") in the column titled "A-muse-ings" by Helen Herman in the Syracuse University Daily Orange, dated March 10, 1931. In the column, Herman states that the word "implies all that is grand, great, glorious, splendid, superb, wonderful".

The word was popularized in the 1964 film Mary Poppins, in which it is used as the title of a song and defined as "something to say when you don't know what to say".

The Sherman Brothers, who wrote the Mary Poppins song, have given several conflicting explanations for the word's origin, in one instance claiming to have coined it themselves, based on their memories of having created double-talk words as children. In another instance, they wrote:

When we were little boys in the mid-1930s, we went to a summer camp in the Adirondack Mountains, where we were introduced to a very long word that had been passed down in many variations through many generations of kids. ... The word as we first heard it was super-cadja-flawjalistic-espealedojus.

Dictionary.com meanwhile says it is "used as a nonsense word by children to express approval or to represent the longest word in English." The word contains 34 letters and 14 syllables.

== Legal action ==
In 1965, the song was the subject of an unsuccessful lawsuit by songwriters Gloria Parker and Barney Young against Wonderland Music, Disney's music publishing subsidiary, and publisher of the song from the film. The plaintiffs alleged that it was a copyright infringement of their 1949 song "Supercalafajalistickespeealadojus". Also known as "The Super Song", it was recorded by Alan Holmes and His New Tones for Columbia Records, with vocal by Hal Marquess and the Holmes Men, and music and lyrics by Patricia Smith (a Gloria Parker pen name) and Don Fenton. Another recording of "Supercalafajalistickespeealadojus", performed by The Arabian Knights and published by Gloro Records, was released in 1951. The Disney publishers won the lawsuit in part because they produced affidavits showing that "variants of the word were known ... many years prior to 1949".

== Backwards version ==
During the song, Poppins says, "You know, you can say it backwards, which is 'dociousaliexpilistic-fragilcalirupus', but that's going a bit too far, don't you think?"—to which Dick Van Dyke replies, "Indubitably". Andrews's husband, Tony Walton, who also designed the sets and costumes, came up with the backwards version.

Her claim was not about spelling it backwards, but rather saying it backwards; in other words, if one breaks the word into several sections or prosodic feet ("super-cali-fragi-listic-expi-ali-docious") and recites them in reverse sequence, and also modifies "super" to "rupus", it comes close to what Poppins said in the film. However, when the word is spelled backwards it actually becomes "suoicodilaipxecitsiligarfilacrepus", which is different. In the stage musical, the word's actual spelling reversal is used.

== Charts ==
"Supercalifragilisticexpialidocious" was released as a single, achieving a measure of commercial success on the U.S. music charts. It peaked at number 66 on the U.S. Billboard Hot 100. It did much better on the Adult Contemporary chart, reaching number 14.

Chart performance for "Supercalifragilisticexpialidocious"
Chart (1965)	Peak position
US Billboard Hot 100	66
US Adult Contemporary (Billboard)	14
US Cash Box Top 100	80

== Certifications ==
Region	Certification	Certified units/sales
United Kingdom (BPI) Sales since 2005	Gold	400,000^{‡}
United States (RIAA)	Gold	500,000^{‡}
^{‡} Sales+streaming figures based on certification alone.

== Stage musical ==
In the stage musical, Mary Poppins takes Jane and Michael Banks to visit Mrs Corry's shop to buy "an ounce of conversation", only to find that Mrs Corry has run out of conversation. She does, however have some letters, and Jane and Michael each pick out seven, with Mary choosing one also. As Bert, Mary and the rest of the ensemble struggle to create words out of the fifteen letters, Mary reminds them that they can always use the same letter more than once, and creates the word (and song) supercalifragilisticexpialidocious. In addition, the cast spells it out in a kind of gesture that was suggested by choreographer Stephen Mear, whose partner is deaf.

== See also ==
- Sesquipedalianism
- Fortuosity, another Sherman Brothers nonsense word song from The Happiest Millionaire
