= Irwin Kostal =

American musical arranger of films (1911-1994)

- Born: October 1, 1911; Chicago, Illinois, U.S.
- Died: November 23, 1994 (aged 83) Studio City, California, U.S.
- Genres: Musical film, musical theatre, animation
- Occupations: Songwriter, screenwriter, publisher
- Years active: 1954–1994

Irwin Kostal (October 1, 1911 – November 23, 1994) was an American musical arranger of films and an orchestrator of Broadway musicals.

== Biography ==
Born in Chicago, Kostal attended Harrison Technical High School, but opted not to attend college, instead teaching himself musical arranging by studying the symphonic scores available at his local library. His first professional job was as a staff arranger for Design for Listening, an NBC radio show based in his hometown. Irwin was one of four children born to James and Emma Kostal in a Czech enclave of Chicago. His siblings James, Jerome and Violet all remained in the Chicago area.

After moving to New York City, Kostal was hired for Sid Caesar's popular variety series Your Show of Shows, and followed this with a stint at The Garry Moore Show.

In the late 1950s, he arranged and conducted two of Julie Andrews' early solo albums on RCA records, "The Lass with the Delicate Air" and "Julie Andrews Sings".

In the latter part of the decade he began working on Broadway, orchestrating for Shinbone Alley, The Music Man, Fiorello!, and West Side Story. His work on the latter resulted in his being hired to score the 1961 screen adaptation with Saul Chaplin, Johnny Green, and Sid Ramin. The quartet won both an Oscar and a Grammy Award for their contributions. Kostal later went on to collaborate with Saul Chaplin for the 1965 film adaptation of the Rodgers & Hammerstein musical The Sound of Music and won an Oscar for Best Music Scoring.

He also conducted the orchestra for several of the Firestone Christmas Albums.

For the remainder of his life, Kostal divided his time primarily between stage and screen, with an occasional detour into television to work with such people as Carol Burnett, Lucille Ball, and Leonard Bernstein. He supervised five of the Sherman Brothers musical film scores (one of them being Mary Poppins) at four different movie studios between 1964 and 1978. In 1982, he conducted the digital re-recording of the music to Walt Disney's 1940 animated feature Fantasia.

== Death ==
Kostal died of a heart attack in Studio City, California. At the time of his death he was a widower (his wife Sylvia had died the year before), and president of the American Society of Music Arrangers and Composers. In 2004 he was named a Disney Legend in recognition of his contributions to films released by the studio.

== Additional filmography ==
- West Side Story (1961)
- Julie and Carol at Carnegie Hall (1962)
- Mary Poppins (1964)
- The Sound of Music (1965)
- Half a Sixpence (1967)
- Chitty Chitty Bang Bang (1968)
- Bedknobs and Broomsticks (1971)
- Charlotte's Web (1973)
- The Blue Bird (1976)
- Pete's Dragon (1977)
- The Magic of Lassie (1978)
- The Million Dollar Dixie Deliverance (1978)
- Fantasia (1982 rerelease of the 1940 film) (Digital re-recorded version)
- Mickey's Christmas Carol (1983)

== Selected shows ==
- 1954-56 Max Liebman's NBC Spectulars: The Merry Widow, Tales of Hoffmann, The Gypsy Baron, Der Fledermaus, The Desert Song with Nelson Eddy, Babes in Toyland, Naughty Marietta, Marco Polo and Lady in the Dark. Orchestrator
- 1956-57 Washington Square with Ray Bolger
- 1957 "Stanley" Series with Buddy Hackett and Carol Burnett. Composer, Arranger and Conductor
- 1957-58 The Patrice Munsel Show
- 1958-1963 The Gary Moore Show, Orchestrator
- 1958 Hans Brinker and the Silver Skates TV Special, Arranger and Conductor
- 1961 Candid Camera with Allen Funt and Arthur Godfrey
- 1962 Julie and Carol at Carnegie Hall, Arranged and Conducted
- 1965 Julie Andrews and Gene Kelly, Arranged and Conducted - Both Emmy Shows
- 1966 Lucy in London Arranged and Conducted
- 1966 Brigadoon Hallmark Hall of Fame (Emmy Show) with Robert Goulet and Sally Ann Howes
- 1971 Dick Van Dyke Special with Michel LeGrand Arranged and Conducted
- 1973 Dr. Jekyll and Mr. Hyde, A musical with Kirk Douglas, Arranged and Conducted - Emmy Nominated
- 1974 Old Faithful with Burgess Meredith, Jadon Robards and Zero Mostel
- 1978 The Million Dollar Dixie Deliverance, Disney TV Movie, Original Score, Arranged and Conducted

== Additional Broadway credits ==
- West Side Story (1957)
- Tenderloin (1960)
- Sail Away (1961)
- A Funny Thing Happened on the Way to the Forum (1962)
- 1491 (1969)
- Gigi (1973)
- Rex (1976)
- Copperfield (1981)
- Seven Brides for Seven Brothers (1982)

== Additional awards and nominations ==
- 1962 - Academy Award - Best Scoring of a Musical Picture, (West Side Story, winner)
- 1965 Academy Award for Best Scoring of Music — Adaptation or Treatment, (Mary Poppins, nominee)
- 1966 Academy Award for Best Scoring of Music — Adaptation or Treatment, (The Sound of Music, winner)
- 1972 Academy Award for Best Original Song Score and Adaptation, (Bedknobs and Broomsticks, nominee)
- 1978 Academy Award for Best Original Song Score and Its Adaptation or Adaptation Score, (Pete's Dragon, nominee)
- 1966 Emmy Award for Individual Achievements in Music - Conducting (The Julie Andrews Show, nominee)
- 1973 Emmy Award for Outstanding Achievement in Music Direction of a Variety, Musical or Dramatic Program (Dr. Jekyll and Mr. Hyde, nominee)
