= Richard M. Sherman =

American songwriter (1928–2024)

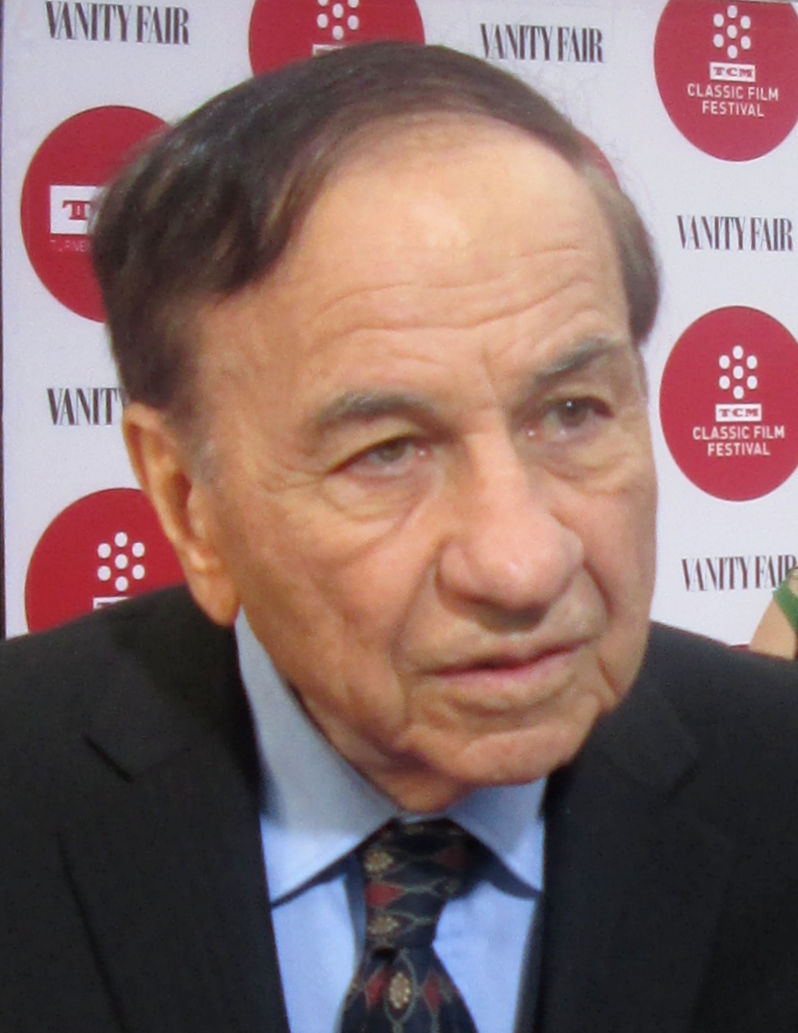
- Sherman in 2014
- Born: Richard Morton Sherman; June 12, 1928; New York City, U.S.
- Died: May 25, 2024 (aged 95); Los Angeles, California, U.S.
- Resting place: Hillside Memorial Park Cemetery, Culver City, California, U.S.
- Education: Bard College
- Occupations: Composer, lyricist, screenwriter, publisher, music director
- Years active: 1950–2024
- Spouse: Elizabeth Gluck (m. 1957)
- Children: 3
- Father: Al Sherman
- Relatives: Robert B. Sherman (brother); Robert J. Sherman (nephew)
- Musical career
- Genres: Musical film, musical theatre, animation music

Richard Morton Sherman (June 12, 1928 – May 25, 2024) was an American songwriter who specialized in musical films with his brother Robert B. Sherman. According to the official Walt Disney Company website and independent fact checkers, "The Sherman Brothers were responsible for more motion picture musical song scores than any other songwriting team in film history."

Some of the Sherman Brothers' best known songs were incorporated into live action and animation musical films including Mary Poppins, The Happiest Millionaire, The Sword in the Stone, The Jungle Book, The Many Adventures of Winnie the Pooh, Chitty Chitty Bang Bang, Snoopy Come Home, Bedknobs and Broomsticks, The Slipper and the Rose, and Charlotte's Web.

Their best known work is "It's a Small World", written for the theme park attraction of the same name. According to Time, it may be the most publicly performed song in history.

== Early life ==
Richard Morton Sherman was born on June 12, 1928, in New York City to Russian Jewish immigrants, Rosa (Dancis) and Al Sherman. Sherman and his older brother Robert eventually followed in their songwriting father's footsteps to form a long-lasting songwriting partnership.

Following seven years of frequent cross-country moves, the Sherman family finally settled down in Beverly Hills, California in 1937. During Richard's years at Beverly Hills High School, he fell in love with music and studied piano, flute and piccolo. At his 1946 high school graduation, Sherman and classmate André Previn played a musical duet with Previn on piano and Sherman on flute. Coincidentally, both would go on to win Academy Awards for music in 1964, with Previn winning for Scoring of Music – Adaptation or Treatment for My Fair Lady, while the Sherman Brothers won for Music Score – Substantially Original for Mary Poppins, as well as a second for Best Original Song for "Chim Chim Cher-ee".

=== Army service and education ===
In 1953, Sherman was drafted into U.S. Army, being assigned to the Army Band and glee club. Serving as musical conductor for both groups from 1953 until his honorable discharge in 1955, he was stationed solely in the United States during his time in the service. During this time, his brother Robert worked with other songwriters.

As a student at Bard College, Sherman majored in music, writing numerous sonatas and "art songs".

== Career ==
Within two years of graduating, Sherman and his brother Robert began writing songs together on a challenge from their father, Al Sherman, a successful popular songwriter in the "Tin Pan Alley" days ("No! No! A Thousand Times No!!", "You Gotta Be a Football Hero").

In 1958, Sherman's brother Robert founded the music publishing company, Music World Corporation, which later worked with Disney's BMI publishing arm, Wonderland Music Company. That same year, the Sherman Brothers had their first Top Ten hit with "Tall Paul", which was sung by Annette Funicello. The success of this song attracted the attention of Walt Disney who eventually hired the Sherman Brothers as Staff Songwriters for Walt Disney Studios. While at Disney, the Sherman Brothers wrote what is perhaps their most recognized song: "It's a Small World (After All)" for the 1964 New York World's Fair. Starting with this movie, and continuing through several subsequent Disney movies, the Sherman Brothers collaborated with noted arranger-conductor Irwin Kostal.

In 1965, the Sherman brothers won 2 Academy Awards for Mary Poppins – Best Original Score, which included "Feed The Birds", "Supercalifragilisticexpialidocious"; and Best Original Song, "Chim Chim Cher-ee". Since Mary Poppins' premiere, Robert B. Sherman subsequently earned 9 Academy Award nominations, 2 Grammy Awards, 4 Grammy Award nominations and 23 gold and platinum albums.

Robert and Richard Sherman worked directly for Walt Disney until Disney's death in 1966. After leaving the company, the brothers worked freelance as songwriters on scores of motion pictures, television shows, theme park exhibits and stage musicals.

Their first non-Disney assignment came with Albert R. Broccoli's motion picture production Chitty Chitty Bang Bang in 1968 which garnered the brothers their third Academy Award Nomination. In 1973, the Sherman Brothers made history by becoming the only Americans ever to win First Prize at the Moscow Film Festival for Tom Sawyer for which they also authored the screenplay.

The Slipper and the Rose was picked to be the Royal Command Performance for 1976 and was attended by Queen Elizabeth. A modern musical adaptation of the classic Cinderella story, Slipper also features both song-score and screenplay by the Sherman Brothers. That same year the Sherman Brothers received their star on the Hollywood "Walk of Fame" directly across from Grauman's Chinese Theater.

Their numerous other Disney and non-Disney top box office film credits include The Jungle Book (1967), The Aristocats (1970), The Parent Trap (1961), The Parent Trap (1998), Charlotte's Web (1973), The Many Adventures of Winnie the Pooh (1977), Snoopy Come Home (1972), Bedknobs and Broomsticks (1971) and Little Nemo: Adventures In Slumberland (1992).

Outside the motion picture realm, their Tony-nominated Over Here! (1974) was the biggest-grossing original Broadway Musical of that year. The Sherman Brothers have also written numerous top-selling songs, including "You're Sixteen", which holds the distinction of reaching Billboard's Top Ten twice; first with Johnny Burnette in 1960 and then with Ringo Starr fourteen years later. Other top-ten hits include, "Pineapple Princess", "Let's Get Together" and more.

In 2000, the Sherman brothers wrote the song score for Disney's blockbuster film: The Tigger Movie (2000). This film marked the brothers' first major motion picture for the Disney company in over 28 years.

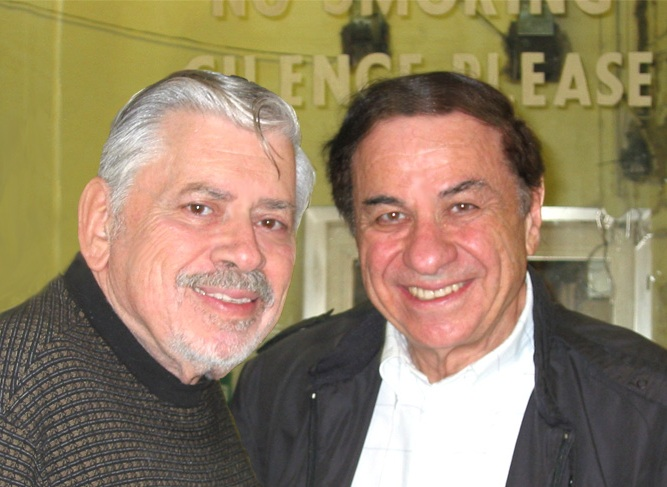
Robert (left) and Richard in 2002

In 2002, the stage musical Chitty Chitty Bang Bang premiered in London. It was the most successful stage show ever produced at the London Palladium, boasting the longest run in that century-old theatre's history. In early 2005 a second Chitty company premiered on Broadway (New York City) at the Foxwoods Theatre (then the Hilton Theatre). The Sherman Brothers wrote an additional six songs specifically for the new stage productions.

In 2003, four Sherman brothers' musicals ranked in the "Top 10 Favorite Children's Films of All Time" in a (British) nationwide poll reported by the BBC. The Jungle Book (1967) ranked at #7, Mary Poppins (1964) ranked at #8, The Aristocats (1970) ranked at #9 and Chitty Chitty Bang Bang (1968) topped the list at #1.

A new Disney and Cameron Mackintosh production of Mary Poppins: The Stage Musical made its world premiere at the Prince Edward Theatre in December 2004 and features the Sherman Brothers classic songs.

In June 2005, Richard M. Sherman was inducted into the Songwriters Hall of Fame with his brother. Chitty opened on Broadway in 2005 and commenced its first full UK tour in December 2005 with subsequent tours and/or tour dates in each year since. Mary Poppins opened on Broadway in 2006.

Recently, Sherman once again collaborated with Disney in three of its live-action films, having rewritten the song "I Wan'na Be Like You" for Jon Favreau's 2016 remake of The Jungle Book. As the film featured the song's performer, King Louie, as a Gigantopithecus, Sherman rewrote it to fit the character's depiction. He also wrote three new songs for the 2018 film Christopher Robin, titled "Goodbye Farewell", "Busy Doing Nothing", and "Christopher Robin", the last two performed by Sherman. Sherman also acted as a music consultant for Mary Poppins Returns, the sequel to Mary Poppins. Sherman also wrote new songs for the upcoming musical stage adaptation of The Jungle Book.

By May 2023, a feature film development deal on the Sherman Brothers' animation musical Inkas the Ramferinkas was announced.

== Personal life ==
In the late 1940s, while Richard was attending Bard college, he was briefly married to Corrine Newman. They had one child, Lynda. In 1957, Richard married Ursula Elizabeth Gluck; the couple had two children, Gregory Vincent and Victoria Lynn. Sherman had six grandchildren.

Following Robert Sherman's relocation from Beverly Hills to London, England, the brothers continued to collaborate musically. They credited the ability to do so long-distance to technology via fax, e-mail, and the low-cost international telephone service. Both brothers frequently traveled between Los Angeles, New York, and London working together on various musical plays until Robert's death in 2012.

Although the brothers always continued collaborating on music, they often had major disputes and their families hardly knew one another. While attending public premieres, they and their families would sit on opposite sides of the theater and when their father died they held two separate shivas.

Richard and Elizabeth were married for over 67 years, until his death. They lived in Beverly Hills, California. He died of "age-related illness" at the Cedars-Sinai Medical Center in Los Angeles, on May 25, 2024, at the age of 95, just 18 days before his 96th birthday. He was buried at Hillside Memorial Park Cemetery in Culver City, California.

== Achievements, honors, tributes ==
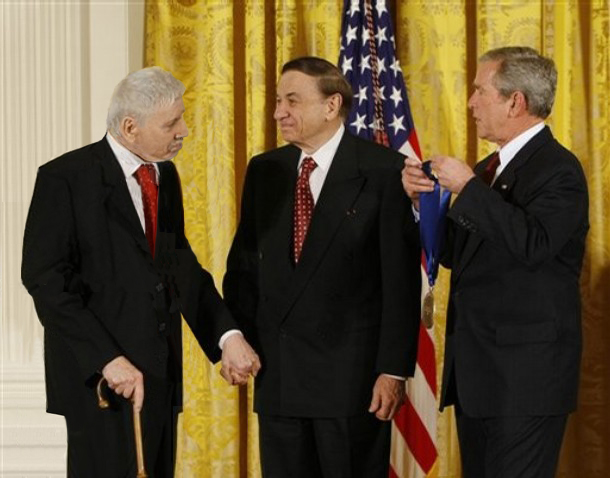
The Sherman Brothers receive the National Medal of Arts at The White House on November 17, 2008, (left to right: Robert B. Sherman, Richard M. Sherman and U.S. President George W. Bush)

- In 2000, the Sherman Brothers wrote the award-winning score to The Tigger Movie which achieved number one status in both theatrical box office and video sales.
- The Sherman Brothers' classic motion picture, Chitty Chitty Bang Bang was adapted into a London West End Musical in 2002 and premiered at the London Palladium on April 16, 2002, featuring many new songs and a reworked score by both Sherman Brothers. It was nominated for a 2003 Laurence Olivier Theatre Award for Best New Musical. The Sherman Brothers each received the "Musical Theatre Award" from the Variety Club of Great Britain that year as well for Chitty. Chitty finished a record-breaking, three-and-a-half-year run at the Palladium, becoming the longest-running show in the theatre's century-long history. 2004 saw the premiere of Mary Poppins on the stage. In 2005, Poppins was nominated for nine Olivier Awards. In 2005 Chitty went to Broadway and was nominated for 9 Tonys and also began its nationwide (UK) tour.
- On June 9, 2005, Sherman was inducted into the Songwriters Hall of Fame alongside Bill Withers, Steve Cropper, John Fogerty, Isaac Hayes, David Porter and his brother, Robert B. Sherman.
- On November 16, 2006, the Cameron Mackintosh/Disney production of Mary Poppins made its Broadway premiere at the New Amsterdam Theater featuring the Sherman Brothers' classic songs.
- During a London press junket promoting the 40th anniversary DVD rerelease of The Jungle Book, Robert and Richard Sherman were witnessed by press working on a new song for Inkas in the same Brown's Hotel room where The Jungle Book was originally penned by the British writer, Rudyard Kipling, over a hundred years earlier.
- In February 2008 Chitty Chitty Bang Bang began a second UK tour. In 2008 and 2009, Poppins premiered in numerous cities throughout the world including: Stockholm, Copenhagen, Budapest, Toronto, Shanghai, Sydney, Johannesburg, Amsterdam, Buenos Aires, São Paulo and Helsinki. Full UK and US tours of Poppins are also scheduled to commence in 2008 and 2009 respectively.
- On November 17, 2008, Robert and Richard Sherman were awarded the National Medal of Arts at the White House by President George W. Bush in the East Room. The National Medal of Arts is an award and title created by the Congress of the United States in 1984, for the purpose of honoring artists and patrons of the arts. It is the highest honor conferred to an individual artist on behalf of the people. Honorees are selected by the National Endowment for the Arts (NEA), and ceremoniously presented the award by the President of the United States.
- In May 2009, a documentary called The Boys: The Sherman Brothers' Story was released. In October 2009, Disney released a 59 track, two CD compendium of their work for the studio spanning forty-two years. The CD is entitled "The Sherman Brothers Songbook".
- On March 11, 2010, the Sherman Brothers were presented with a Window on Mainstreet Disneyland in Anaheim, California in honor of their contribution to Disney theme parks. On May 17, 2010, the "Career Achievement Award" at The Theatre Museum's 2010 Awards Gala.
- On May 21, 2011, the Sherman Brothers were each awarded honorary doctorate degrees in Fine Arts from their alma mater, Bard College. This was Robert's second honorary doctorate. His first was granted by Lincoln College on May 12, 1990.
- In 2013 Richard was musical consultant for the live-action production of The Jungle Book at the Goodman Theatre in Chicago, IL.
- In 2014 the Sherman Brothers, alongside their father, Al Sherman were the subjects of a London musical concert entitled, A Spoonful of Sherman written, produced and hosted by Richard's nephew, Robert J. Sherman. The concert received generally very positive reviews including four stars from the London Times. A CD produced by Nick Lloyd Webber was released by SimG Records in 2015.
- In 2015, Sherman was awarded the Diane Disney Miller Lifetime Achievement Award by The Walt Disney Family Museum.
- In 2017 A Spoonful of Sherman was revived, playing at the venue, "Live at Zédel" in London.
- On July 31, 2018, the Walt Disney Studios in Burbank, California renamed Soundstage A the Sherman Brothers Stage.
- In 2018 the first A Spoonful of Sherman UK/Ireland Tour began with previews on February 14, 2018, at the EM Forester Theatre in Tonbridge, Kent. The tour played in 28 cities in England, Scotland, Wales and the Republic of Ireland. Cast members for the tour included Sophie-Louise Dann, Mark Read, Glen Facey, Jenna Innes and Ben Stock.
- In 2021/22 the stage adaptation of Disney's Bedknobs and Broomsticks toured the UK and Ireland produced by Michael Harrison with additional music, new songs and lyrics by Neil Bartram and book by Brian Hill.
- On August 10, 2024, as part of D23: The Ultimate Disney Fan Event, Meghan Trainor performed "Feed the Birds" in Honda Center during the Disney Experiences Showcase presentation in honor of the late Sherman Brothers.
- On August 11, 2024, as part of D23: "Jolly Holiday: A Musical Celebration of Robert M. Sherman", Lesley Ann Warren and Hayley Mills perform "Let's Get Together" at the Anaheim Convention Center.

== List of works ==
=== Major film scores ===
- The Parent Trap (1961)
- Big Red (1962)
- Summer Magic (1963)
- The Sword in the Stone (1963)
- Mary Poppins (1964)
- The Happiest Millionaire (1967)
- The Jungle Book (1967)
- The One and Only, Genuine, Original Family Band (1968)
- Chitty Chitty Bang Bang (1968)
- The Aristocats (1970)
- Bedknobs and Broomsticks (1971)
- Snoopy Come Home (1972)
- Charlotte's Web (1973)
- The Adventures of Huckleberry Finn (1974)
- The Slipper and the Rose (1976)
- The Many Adventures of Winnie the Pooh (1977)
- The Magic of Lassie (1978)
- Little Nemo: Adventures in Slumberland (1992)
- The Tigger Movie (2000)
- Iron Man 2 (2010) (Composed the song "Make Way For Tomorrow Today".)
- The Jungle Book (2016)
- Christopher Robin (2018)

=== Motion picture screenplays ===
- Mary Poppins, 1964 (*treatment only)
- The Adventures of Tom Sawyer, 1973
- The Adventures of Huckleberry Finn, 1974
- The Slipper and the Rose, 1976
- The Magic of Lassie, 1978

=== Stage musicals ===
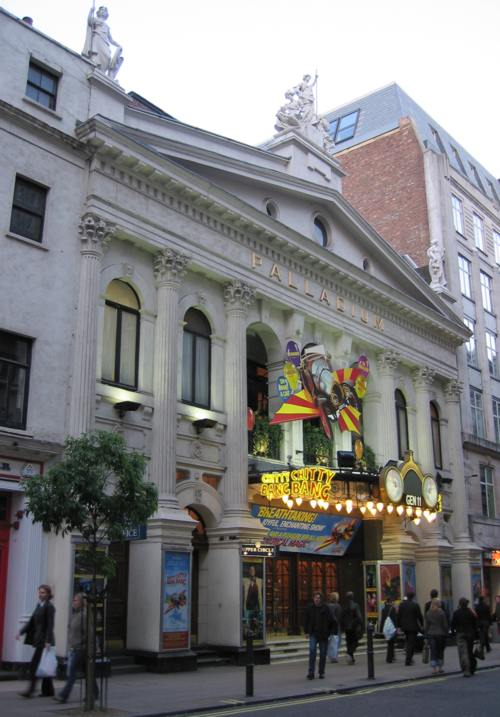
The London Palladium in 2004

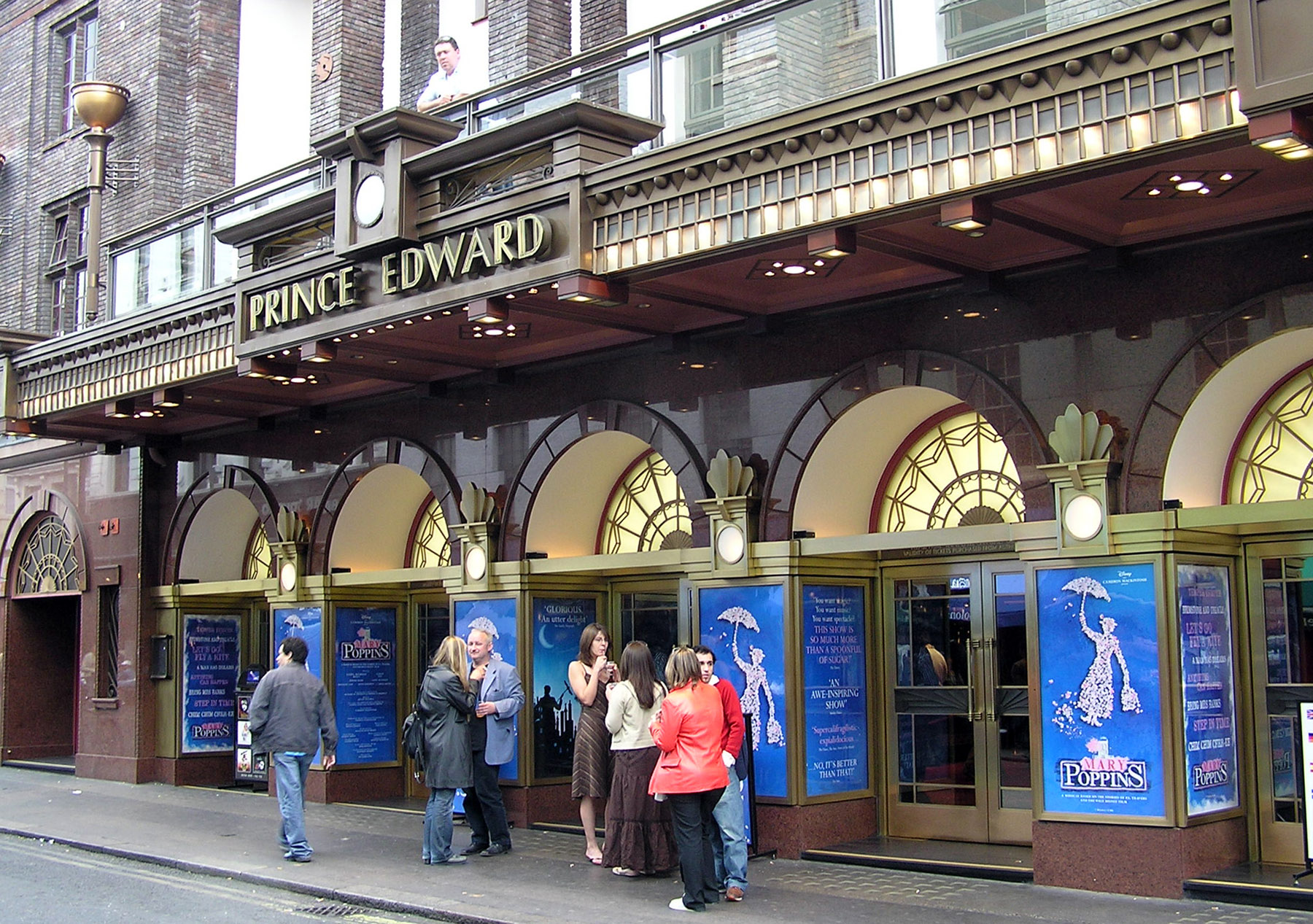
Prince Edward Theatre in 2005

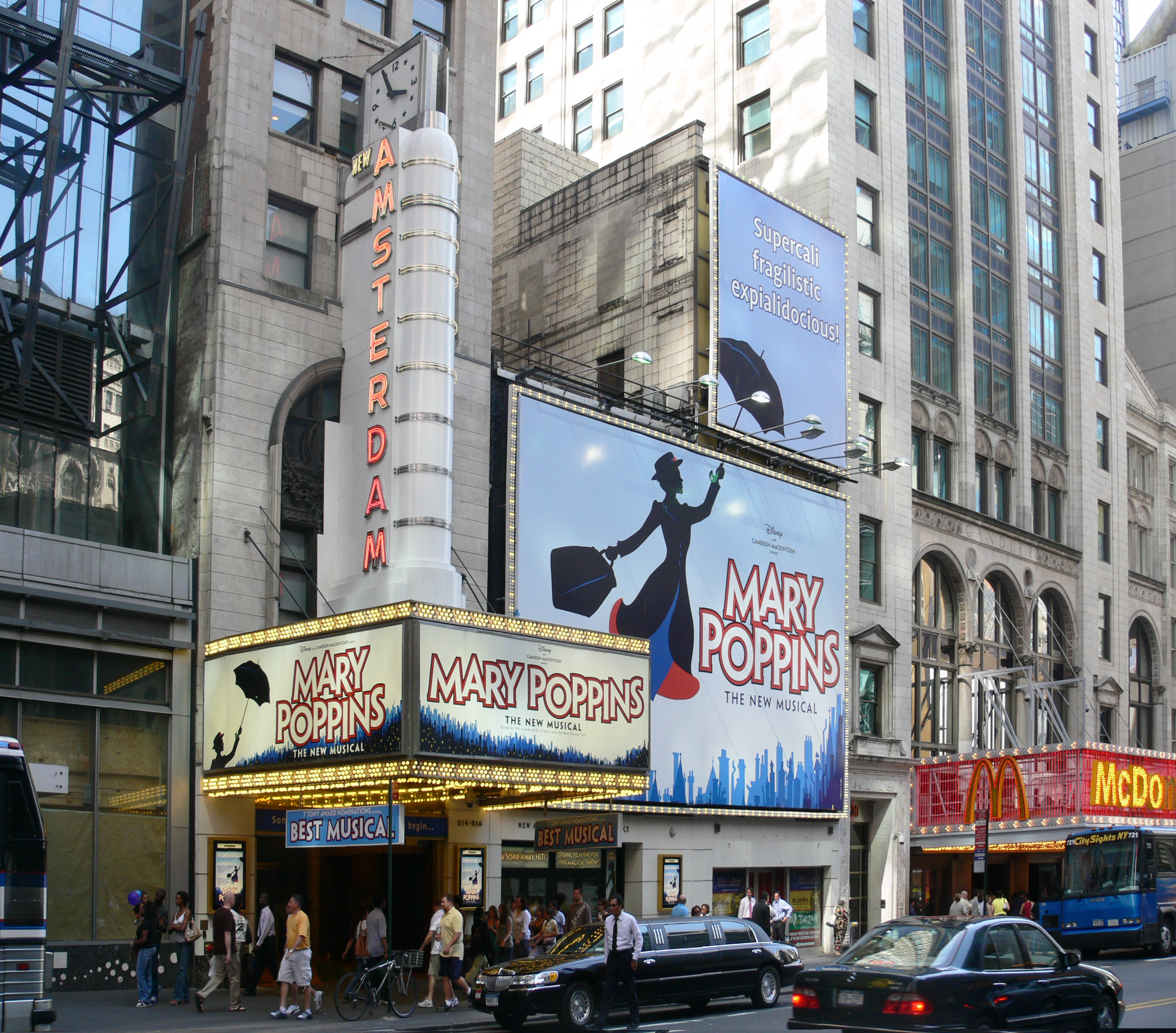
New Amsterdam Theatre in 2007

- Victory Canteen, 1971 (Ivar Theatre, Los Angeles)
- Over Here!, 1974 (Broadway, New York City)
- Busker Alley, 1995 (U.S. tour)
- Chitty Chitty Bang Bang, 2002 (London)
- Mary Poppins, 2004 (London)
- On the Record, 2004–5 (U.S. tour)
- A Spoonful of Sherman, 2014 (London)
- Bedknobs and Broomsticks, 2021 (U.K. tour)

=== Theme park songs ===
- "There's a Great Big Beautiful Tomorrow" for Carousel of Progress
- "The Best Time of Your Life" for Carousel of Progress
- "Miracles from Molecules" for Adventure Thru Inner Space
- "One Little Spark" for Journey into Imagination
- "Magic Journeys" for Magic Journeys
- "It's a Small World (After All)" for the 1964 New York World's Fair attraction
- "The Tiki, Tiki, Tiki Room" for Walt Disney's Enchanted Tiki Room
- "We Meet the World with Love" and "Meet the World" for the same exhibit in Tokyo Disneyland

== Professional awards ==
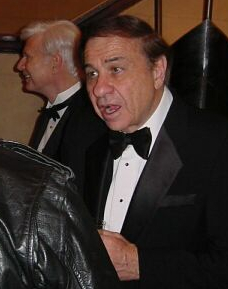
Sherman in 2003 at the Annie Award

Award	Year	Film	Category	Result
Academy Awards	1964	Mary Poppins	Best Original Song for "Chim Chim Cher-ee" (shared with Robert B. Sherman)	Won
Academy Awards	1964	Mary Poppins	Best Music Score-Substantially Original (shared with Robert B. Sherman)	Won
Academy Awards	1968	Chitty Chitty Bang Bang	Best Original Song for "Chitty Chitty Bang Bang" (shared with Robert B. Sherman)	Nominated
Academy Awards	1971	Bedknobs and Broomsticks	Best Original Song for "The Age of Not Believing" (shared with Robert B. Sherman)	Nominated
Academy Awards	1971	Bedknobs and Broomsticks	Best Scoring Adaptation and Original Song Score (song score by Richard M. Sherman & Robert B. Sherman, adaptation score by Irwin Kostal)	Nominated
Academy Awards	1973	Tom Sawyer	Best Scoring Adaptation and Original Song Score (song score by Richard M. Sherman & Robert B. Sherman, adaptation score by John Williams)	Nominated
Academy Awards	1977	The Slipper and the Rose	Best Original Song for "The Slipper and the Rose Waltz (He/She Danced with Me)" (shared with Robert B. Sherman)	Nominated
Academy Awards	1977	The Slipper and the Rose	Best Original Song Score & Its Adaptation Or Best Adaptation Score (song score by Richard M. Sherman & Robert B. Sherman, adaptation score by Angela Morley)	Nominated
Academy Awards	1978	The Magic of Lassie	Best Original Song for "When You're Loved" (shared with Robert B. Sherman)	Nominated
Annie Awards	2000	The Tigger Movie	Music in an Animated Feature Production for "Round My Family Tree" (shared with Robert B. Sherman)	Nominated
Annie Awards	2003	Winsor McCay Award	"for lifetime achievement and contribution to animation"	Honored
BAFTA Awards	1977	The Slipper and the Rose	Anthony Asquith Award for Original Film Music	Nominated
Golden Globe Awards	1964	Mary Poppins	Best Original Score	Nominated
Golden Globe Awards	1968	The One and Only, Genuine, Original Family Band	Best Original Score	Nominated
Golden Globe Awards	1968	Chitty Chitty Bang Bang	Best Original Score	Nominated
Golden Globe Awards	1968	Chitty Chitty Bang Bang	Best Original Song for "Chitty Chitty Bang Bang" (shared with Robert B. Sherman)	Nominated
Golden Globe Awards	1973	Tom Sawyer	Best Original Score	Nominated
Golden Globe Awards	1977	The Slipper and the Rose	Best Original Score	Nominated
Grammy Awards	1964	Mary Poppins	Best Original Score for a Motion Picture or Television Show	Won
Grammy Awards	1964	Mary Poppins	Best Recording for Children	Won
Grammy Awards	1966	Winnie the Pooh and the Honey Tree	Best Recording for Children	Nominated
Grammy Awards	1967	The Jungle Book	Best Recording for Children	Nominated
Grammy Awards	1968	Chitty Chitty Bang Bang	Best Recording for Children	Nominated
Grammy Awards	1970	The Aristocats	Best Recording for Children	Nominated
Grammy Awards	1973	Snoopy Come Home	Best Original Score for a Children's Show	Nominated
Grammy Awards	1975	Over Here!	Best Original Score for a Musical Show	Nominated
Grammy Awards	1975	Winnie the Pooh and Tigger Too!	Best Recording for Children	Won
Hollywood Music in Media Awards	2023	Mushka	Original Song-Short Film	Won
Laurence Olivier Awards	2002	Chitty Chitty Bang Bang	Best New Musical	Nominated
Moscow International Film Festival	1973	Tom Sawyer	Best Music	Won

- 1976 A Star on the Hollywood Walk of Fame awarded to "Richard & Robert Sherman" on November 17, 1976, located at 6914 Hollywood Blvd.
- 1985 "Mousecar" awarded at the Hollywood Bowl in Hollywood, California in front of 20 thousand people.
- 1990 "Disney Legends" awarded at the Walt Disney Studios in Burbank, California.
- 2005 inducted in the Songwriters Hall of Fame at the Marriott Hotel on Times Square in New York City.
- 2008 National Medal of Arts awarded to Richard and Robert Sherman on November 17, 2008, at the White House by President George W. Bush. This is the highest honor the United States Government bestows on artists.
- 2010 Main Street, U.S.A. Window presented at Disneyland in Anaheim, California in honor of the Sherman Brothers' contribution to Disney theme parks.

== Bibliography ==
- Sherman, Robert B. Walt's Time: from before to beyond. Santa Clarita: Camphor Tree Publishers, 1998.
- Greene, Katherine and Richard. Inside The Dream: The Personal Story of Walt Disney. New York: Disney Editions, 2001.
- Peterson, Monique. Disney's The Little Big Book of Pooh. New York: Disney Editions, 2002.
- Tietyen, David. The Musical World of Walt Disney. Milwaukee, Wisconsin: Hal Leonard Publishing Corporation, 1990.
