= The Sherman Brothers Songbook =

Compilation album by Richard M. Sherman and Robert B. Sherman
- Released: October 13, 2009
- Length: 148:28
- Label: Walt Disney

The Sherman Brothers Songbook is a compilation of songs written by composer-lyricist Richard M. Sherman and Robert B. Sherman. It includes the Sherman Brothers' work for Disney and their non-Disney output. It was released on CD on October 13, 2009.

== Track listing ==
All tracks are written by Richard M. Sherman & Robert B. Sherman except where noted.

Disc One
No.	Title	Lead vocals	Length
1.	"Tall Paul (Annette)" (Sherman Brothers + Bob Roberts)	Annette Funicello	1:34
2.	"Pineapple Princess (Hawaiiannette)"	Annette Funicello	2:25
3.	"The Flubber Song (The Absent-Minded Professor)"	Fred MacMurray	2:06
4.	"The Parent Trap (The Parent Trap)"	Annette Funicello	2:15
5.	"For Now, For Always (The Parent Trap)"	Maureen O'Hara	2:14
6.	"Let's Get Together (The Parent Trap)"	Hayley Mills	1:29
7.	"The Wonderful World of Color (The Wonderful World of Color)"	The Wellingtons	1:40
8.	"The Spectrum Song (An Adventure in Color)"	Paul Frees	1:33
9.	"The Green with Envy Blues (An Adventure in Color)"	Paul Frees	2:48
10.	"Strummin' Song (The Horsemasters)"	Annette Funicello	2:04
11.	"Although I Dropped $100,000 in the Market (A Symposium on Popular Songs)"	Paul Frees	1:47
12.	"I'm Blue for You (Boo Boo Boo Boo Boo) (A Symposium on Popular Songs)"	Skip Farrell	2:06
13.	"Castaway (In Search of the Castaways)"	Hayley Mills	1:24
14.	"Enjoy It! (In Search of the Castaways)"	Maurice Chevalier/Hayley Mills	2:07
15.	"On the Front Porch (Summer Magic)"	Burl Ives	3:23
16.	"Femininity (Summer Magic)"	Hayley Mills/Deborah Walley/Wendy Turner	1:59
17.	"The Ugly Bug Ball (Summer Magic)"	Burl Ives	3:02
18.	"The Tiki, Tiki, Tiki Room (Walt Disney's Enchanted Tiki Room)"	Wally Boag/Fulton Burley/Thurl Ravenscroft/The Mellomen	2:39
19.	"It's a Small World (It's a Small World)"	Disney Studio Chorus	1:54
20.	"There's a Great Big Beautiful Tomorrow (Walt Disney's Carousel of Progress)"	Rex Allen	2:16
21.	"A Spoonful of Sugar (Mary Poppins)"	Julie Andrews	4:07
22.	"Chim Chim Cher-ee (Mary Poppins)"	Julie Andrews/Dick Van Dyke/Karen Dotrice/Matthew Garber	2:46
23.	"Feed the Birds (Tuppence a Bag) (Mary Poppins)"	Julie Andrews	3:50
24.	"Supercalifragilisticexpialidocious (Mary Poppins)"	Julie Andrews/Dick Van Dyke	2:01
25.	"The Monkey's Uncle (The Monkey's Uncle)"	Annette Funicello/The Beach Boys	2:32
26.	"That Darn Cat (That Darn Cat)"	Bobby Troup and his Trio	2:45
27.	"Winnie the Pooh (Winnie the Pooh and the Honey Tree)"	Disney Studio Chorus	2:18
28.	"Up, Down and Touch the Ground (Winnie the Pooh and the Honey Tree)"	Sterling Holloway	1:02
29.	"Little Black Rain Cloud (Winnie the Pooh and the Honey Tree)"	Sterling Holloway	0:50
30.	"I Wan'na Be Like You (The Monkey Song) (The Jungle Book)"	Louis Prima/Phil Harris/Bruce Reitherman	4:02
31.	"Trust in Me (The Python's Song) (The Jungle Book)"	Sterling Holloway	2:49
32.	"My Own Home (The Jungle Book)"	Darleen Carr	3:29

Disc Two
No.	Title	Lead vocals	Length
1.	"Fortuosity (The Happiest Millionaire)"	Tommy Steele	3:10
2.	"Valentine Candy (The Happiest Millionaire)"	Lesley Ann Warren	3:41
3.	"Are We Dancing? (The Happiest Millionaire)"	Lesley Ann Warren/John Davidson	3:24
4.	"It Won't Be Long 'Til Christmas (The Happiest Millionaire)"	Anne Shelton	3:15
5.	"The Wonderful Thing About Tiggers (Winnie the Pooh and the Blustery Day)"	Paul Winchell	0:34
6.	"Heffalumps and Woozles (Winnie the Pooh and the Blustery Day)"	Disney Chorus	2:03
7.	"The Rain Rain Rain Came Down Down Down (Winnie the Pooh and the Blustery Day)"	Disney Chorus	1:38
8.	"Ten Feet off the Ground (The One and Only, Genuine, Original Family Band)"	Louis Armstrong	2:45
9.	"The Happiest Girl Alive (The One and Only, Genuine, Original Family Band)"	Lesley Ann Warren	3:06
10.	"'Bout Time (The One and Only, Genuine, Original Family Band)"	Lesley Ann Warren/John Davidson	2:45
11.	"Chitty Chitty Bang Bang (Chitty Chitty Bang Bang)"	Camarata/The Mike Sammes Singers	2:25
12.	"Hushabye Mountain (Chitty Chitty Bang Bang)"	Camarata/The Mike Sammes Singers	2:55
13.	"Me Ol' Bamboo (Chitty Chitty Bang Bang)"	Camarata/The Mike Sammes Singers	2:12
14.	"The Aristocats (The Aristocats)"	Maurice Chevalier	2:18
15.	"Scales and Arpeggios (The Aristocats)"	Mike Sammes Singers	1:44
16.	"She Never Felt Alone (The Aristocats)"	Robie Lester	2:11
17.	"The Age of Not Believing (Bedknobs and Broomsticks)"	Angela Lansbury	3:16
18.	"Portebello Road (Bedknobs and Broomsticks)"	The Street Vendors	3:25
19.	"The Beautiful Briny (Bedknobs and Broomsticks)"	David Tomlinson/Angela Lansbury	3:59
20.	"One Little Spark (Journey into Imagination)"	Chuck McCann/Billy Barty	3:35
21.	"Makin' Memories (Magic Journeys)"	Disney Studio Chorus	3:26
22.	"Magic Journeys (Magic Journeys)"	Disney Studio Chorus	3:33
23.	"Meet the World (Meet the World)"	Tokyo Disneyland Park Cast	2:35
24.	"Pooh's Lullabee (The Tigger Movie)"	Jim Cummings	1:36
25.	"Whoop-De-Dooper Bounce (The Tigger Movie)"	Jim Cummings/Nikita Hopkins	2:09
26.	"Your Heart Will Lead You Home (The Tigger Movie)" (Sherman Brothers + Kenny Loggins)	Kenny Loggins	4:22
27.	"There's a Great Big Beautiful Tomorrow"	Walt Disney, Bob Sherman and Dick Sherman	1:10
