= Theme park live adaptations of The Lion King =

Theme park attraction

There have been seven theme park live adaptations of The Lion King at Disney Parks since the Disney animated feature film The Lion King was released by Walt Disney Animation Studios in 1994. These have included a parade, two theater-in-the-round shows (both of which are versions of Festival of the Lion King), and four stage shows (three of which are live musical stage show retellings of the story with costumed performers).

== The Lion King Celebration ==
The Lion King Celebration

Disneyland
- Area: Main Street, U.S.A. It's a Small World
- Status: Removed
- Opening date: June 1, 1994
- Closing date: June 1, 1997
- Replaced: Aladdin's Royal Caravan
- Replaced by: Hercules' Victory Parade

Ride statistics
- Attraction type: Parade
- Theme: The Lion King
- Floats: 6

The Lion King Celebration was a parade that ran at Disneyland Park in California from June 1, 1994 to June 1, 1997. The parade's design centered around the story of Simba, the main protagonist of The Lion King, as if it were a tale passed down in Africa for generations. The lineup featured six floats designed around different aspects of African culture, dancers dressed in animal costumes, and a Pride Rock float featuring Simba and Nala.

The design of the parade had strong roots in traditional African artwork, featuring vibrant colors, traditional designs, and dance routines based on traditional African dances. The parade featured six floats, accompanied by a total of 89 cast members. This included 56 dancers, 12 puppeteers, 10 acrobatic pole dancers, 6 musicians and 5 remote control operators. The Lion King Celebration also featured the first use of Audio-Animatronics in a Disneyland parade as well as the first use of "Puppetronics", a technique used to create the large, lifelike animal puppets featured on the floats. Puppetronics allowed the animatronic animals to be controlled by a puppeteer but still retain complex movement, allowing for a smoother and more realistic performance.

A commemorative VHS, hosted by Robert Guillaume, was released by the park featuring the parade and behind-the-scenes footage. After the parade's run ended in 1997, four of the floats were moved to Disney's Animal Kingdom for the Festival of the Lion King show. Other assets from the parade were reused in other parades, including Walt Disney's Parade of Dreams.

=== Plot ===
Set to a mostly instrumental version of the song "I Just Can't Wait to Be King", the first characters to appear are two rhinoceroses, followed by tribal dancers, drummers and a float featuring Zazu and Rafiki with two giraffes. Zazu and Rafiki introduce the parade as it continues down Main Street, U.S.A. or It's a Small World, depending on where you viewed it from.

Next, a herd of gazelle dancers dressed in spandex costumes with hoods precede a float with tribal gazelle designs pushed along by wildebeest dancers. They are followed by a group of tribal crane dancers, the elephant float and two remote-controlled crocodiles. The elephant on the float occasionally shoots a stream of water from its trunk. In the first year of the show, the larger "mother" elephant was preceded by a smaller "baby" elephant whose costume was similar to that of the previously mentioned rhinoceroses, only larger. Two pole dancers dressed in tribal bird costumes walk at the sides.

Leopard dancers dance around the Rainforest float, which features monkey dancers on swings and Pumbaa on the back. Pumbaa talks to Timon, who follows behind while chasing three remote-controlled bugs including a scorpion and a rhinoceros beetle.

Two tribal-bird pole dancers lead the Drum Dancer float, which features drummers, dancers and percussionists in colourful, vibrant tribal costumes.

The last float - Pride Rock - is led by a group of zebra and cheetah dancers, two tribal elephant dancers and two tribal bird dancers. Simba stands atop Pride Rock while Nala roars and drums out the beat with her paw at the foot of the float. Above them, Mufasa's face is represented in a spinning sun design. The end of the parade is marked by two tribal zebra performers holding a rope.

The parade eventually stops and Mufasa's bass voice is heard telling Simba to take his place in the Circle of Life. The song "Circle of Life" begins to play and the dancers dance and leap around the floats as the drummers drum along to the song. At the end of the song, Simba roars and white doves are released from one of the floats, symbolizing hope and peace.

== Festival of the Lion King ==
Festival of the Lion King

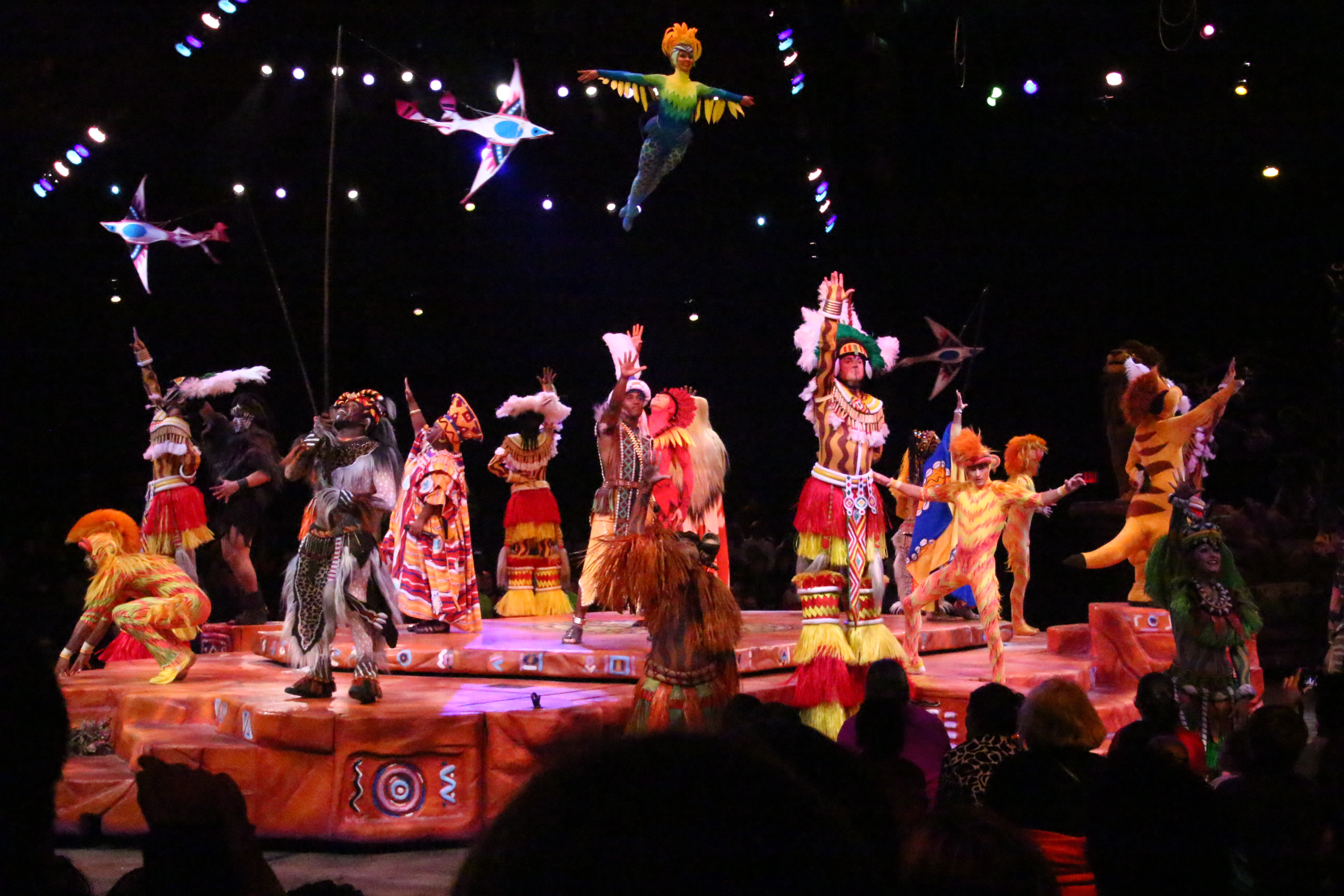
- Scene from the show's finale at Disney's Animal Kingdom

Disney's Animal Kingdom
- Name: A Celebration of Festival of the Lion King (2021–2022)
- Area: Camp Minnie–Mickey (1998–2014); Africa (2014–present)
- Status: Operating
- Soft opening date: May 8, 2021 (A Celebration of Festival of the Lion King)
- Opening date: April 22, 1998 (original); June 1, 2014 (relocation); May 15, 2021 (reopening); July 16, 2022 (revamped version)
- Closing date: January 5, 2014 (original)
- Replaced by: Pandora – The World of Avatar (original)

Hong Kong Disneyland
- Area: Adventureland
- Status: Operating
- Opening date: September 12, 2005

Ride statistics
- Attraction type: Musical show
- Model: Theatre in the round
- Theme: The Lion King
- Music: Elton John (music), Tim Rice (lyrics) & Hans Zimmer (score)
- Audience capacity: 2,210 (Hong Kong) per show
- Duration: 30:00
- Show hosts: Kiume, Nakawa, Kibibi, Zawadi and Timon (Orlando); The Storyteller (Hong Kong)
- Lightning Lane Available
- Wheelchair accessible

Festival of the Lion King is the name of two live stage musicals, one performed at Disney's Animal Kingdom in Walt Disney World, and the other in Adventureland at Hong Kong Disneyland. The shows, original interpretations of the Disney animated film The Lion King, use songs, dance, puppetry and visual effects to portray a tribal celebration in an African savanna setting filled with lions, elephants, giraffes, birds, zebras and gazelles.

=== Disney's Animal Kingdom version ===
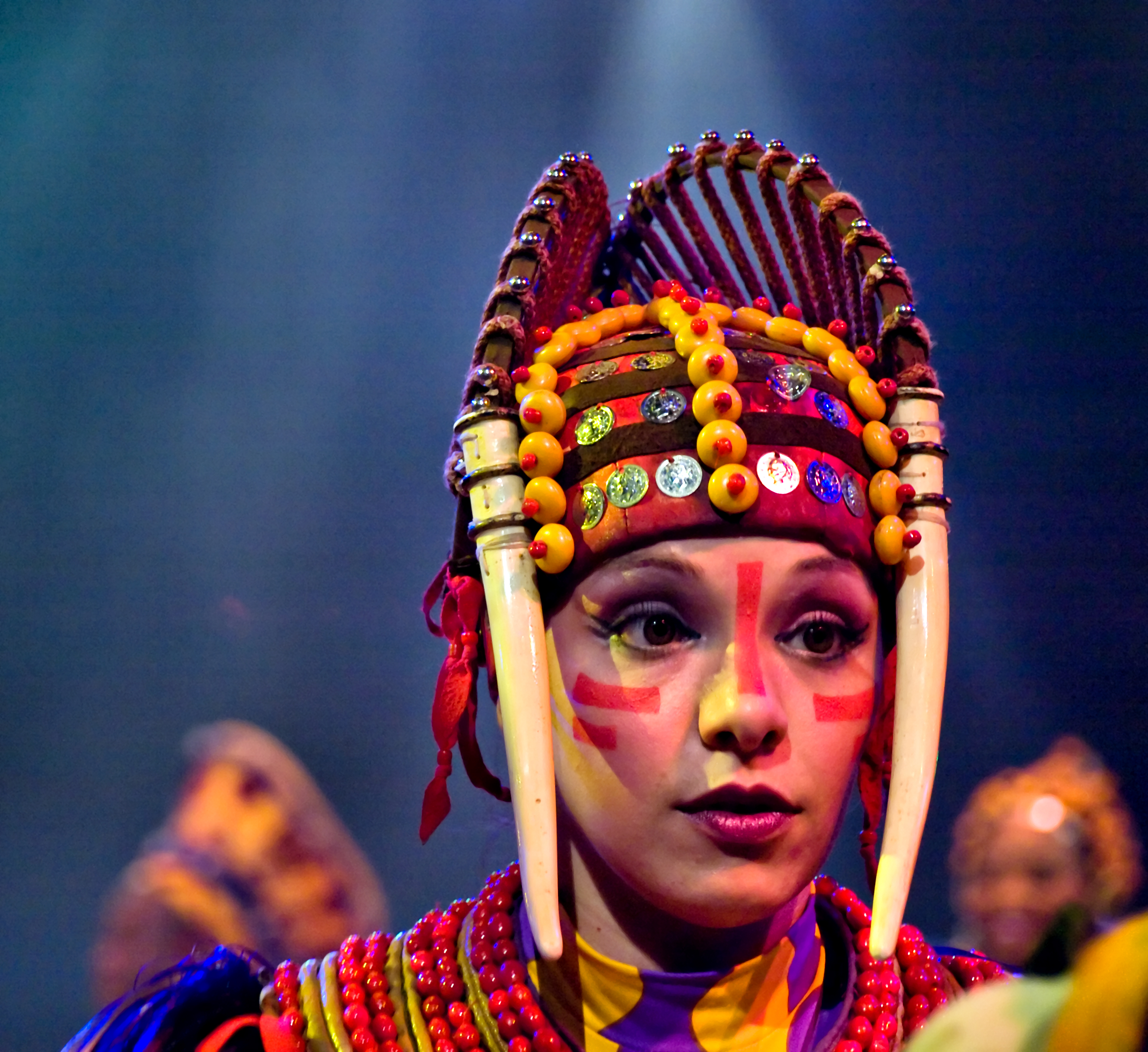
A dancer during a performance of Festival of the Lion King at Disney's Animal Kingdom.

The Disney's Animal Kingdom version of the show is presented as a celebration with Simba and his friends, including a band of four human singers. The show is in the form of a revue, and not a condensed version of either the film or the Broadway show. The show features Elton John and Tim Rice's songs from the movie, and Solomon Linda's song "The Lion Sleeps Tonight".

The show is performed inside an enclosed theater-in-the-round in Camp Minnie-Mickey. Guests sit in four sections, each designated with an animal name: Giraffe, Elephant, Warthog, Lion. These animals are represented by large puppets on parade-style floats, which were originally built for Disneyland's The Lion King Celebration parade. The show is hosted by four performers dressed in costumes inspired by traditional African dress. Each has a Swahili name: Kiume (meaning "masculine and strong"), Nakawa ("good-looking"), Kibibi ("princess"), and Zawadi ("the gift").

After the hosts welcome the audience to the show, the curtains open and a procession of dancers, puppeteers, and stilt walkers enter the theater (to the song "I Just Can't Wait to Be King"). Among them are Lion King characters Simba, Pumbaa (both puppets on floats), and Timon (played by a live performer). Acts include gymnastic "Tumble Monkeys" ("Hakuna Matata"), a fire knife-twirling "hyena" ("Be Prepared"), and an aerial dance featuring performers dressed as birds ("Can You Feel the Love Tonight"), leading to an interactive sing-along ("The Lion Sleeps Tonight"). The finale features reprises of all of these acts, ending with "Circle of Life".

==== Relocation ====
Due to the construction of Pandora – The World of Avatar replacing Camp Minnie-Mickey, the show went into a five-month hiatus while a new theater, the Harambe Theater, was constructed in an unused dense forest area in the Africa section of the park.

Construction on the Harambe Theater was completed in May 2014 and the show reopened there on June 1, 2014. This relocation was part of a wider expansion of Africa, which included a new path, restrooms, and new restaurants.

==== 2020 labor dispute ====
When Walt Disney World reopened in July 2020 following the COVID-19 shutdown, all stage shows such as Finding Nemo – The Musical, Beauty and the Beast Live on Stage, Festival of the Lion King, and the Indiana Jones Epic Stunt Spectacular! remained closed due to a dispute between the Actors’ Equity Association and Walt Disney World over allowing performers to wear face masks and providing regular testing.

An abridged version of the show, titled A Celebration of Festival of the Lion King, premiered on May 8, 2021. An updated version of the original show returned on July 16, 2022, as part of Walt Disney World's 50th Anniversary celebration.

=== Hong Kong Disneyland version ===
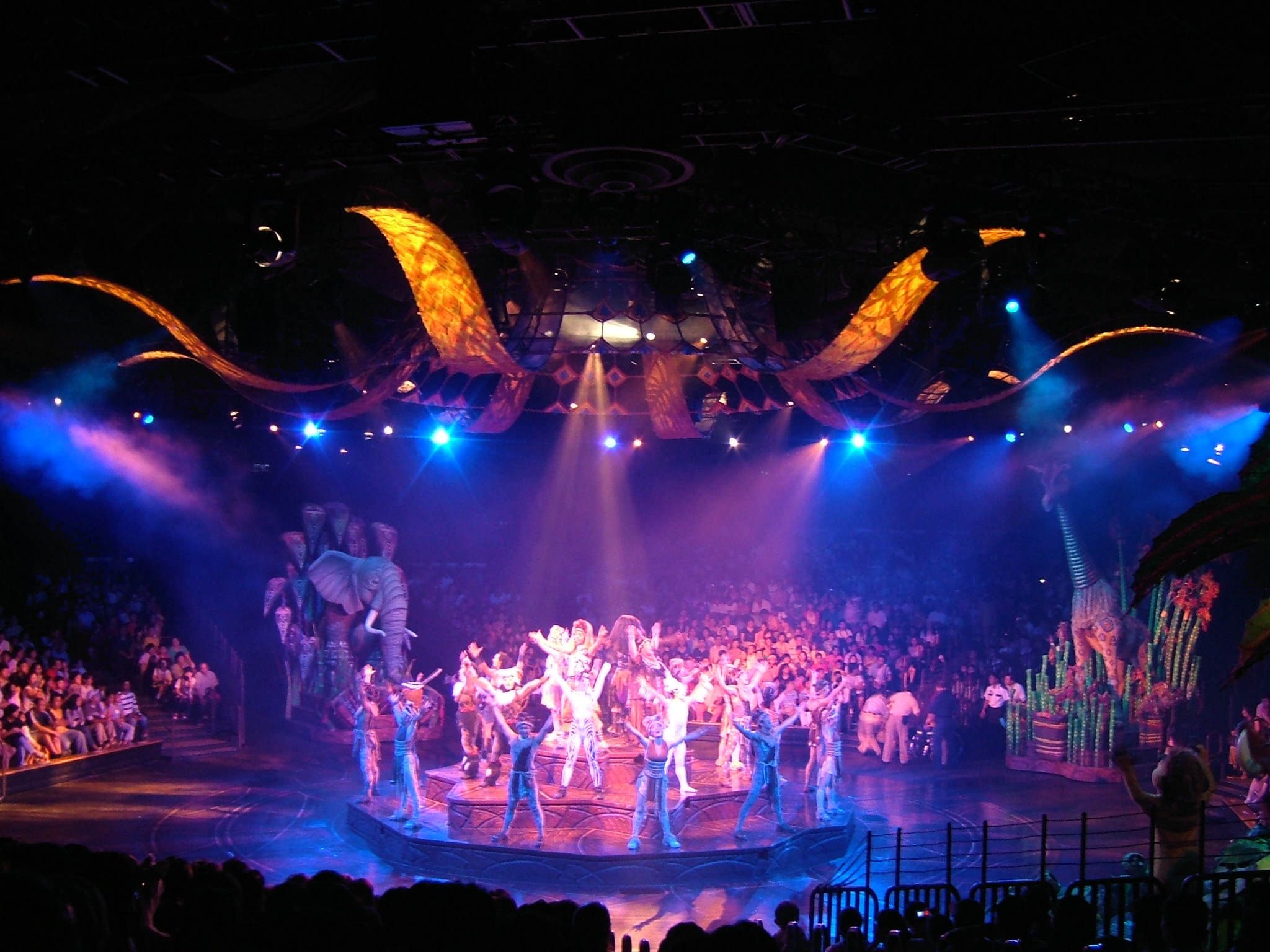
Musical at Hong Kong Disneyland

The Hong Kong Disneyland version of the show is presented as a simplified version of the story of The Lion King, told through songs from the movie.

The show is performed in the "Theater in the Wild" in Adventureland. Similar to the theater setting in Disney's Animal Kingdom, guests sit in four different sections themed to a specific animal, and accompanied by a parade-style float. The performance is mainly in English, but two actors dressed as monkeys summarise and translate some of the lines into Cantonese in order to accommodate Hong Kong guests. Simplified Chinese subtitles, for Chinese visitors, are also projected onto the screens above each seating section. The show is presented to Simba by the Storyteller (portrayed by a female actress) as a re-telling of the story of Simba's life from a cub to the current king of the Pridelands. Simba himself is represented by a large, elaborate puppet on the "lion" float.

=== Soundtrack ===
"Celebration Finale", from the soundtrack CD
Clip from "Celebration Finale (Hakuna Matata/Can You Feel the Love Tonight/Be Prepared/I Just Can't Wait to Be King/Circle of Life)".

A soundtrack CD was released in 2001, titled Festival of The Lion King (Disney's Animal Kingdom at Walt Disney World)

Track listing:

1. "Circle of Life" – 1:40
2. "I Just Can't Wait to Be King" – 2:40
3. "Hakuna Matata" – 2:04
4. Tumble Monkeys ("Sing, Sing, Sing"/"Playmates"/"Snake Charmer"/"Caravan"/"Hakuna Matata"/"Yes! We Have No Bananas"/"Hawaiian War Chant") – 3:56
5. "Be Prepared" – 3:00
6. "Can You Feel the Love Tonight"/"Circle of Life" (Medley) – 4:45
7. "The Lion Sleeps Tonight" – 2:28
8. Celebration Finale ("Hakuna Matata"/"Can You Feel the Love Tonight"/"Be Prepared"/"I Just Can't Wait to Be King"/"Circle of Life") – 3:45
9. "Circle of Life" (Bows) – 0:34
10. "I Just Can't Wait to Be King" (Instrumental) – 2:34

== Legend of The Lion King ==
Legend of the Lion King

Magic Kingdom
- Area: Fantasyland
- Status: Removed
- Opening date: July 8, 1994
- Closing date: February 23, 2002
- Replaced: Mickey Mouse Revue (1971–1980); Magic Journeys (1987–1993)
- Replaced by: Mickey's PhilharMagic (Castle Courtyard)

Ride statistics
- Attraction type: Show
- Assistive listening available

The Legend of the Lion King show at the Magic Kingdom in the Walt Disney World in Florida was a stage performance retelling the story of the film using life size puppets.

The show debuted on July 8, 1994 in the Fantasyland Theater. Legend of The Lion King replaced the 3D movie Magic Journeys, which was shown in the theater from December 1987 through December 1993. This show featured what Disney described as "Disney Humanimals", which were "larger-than-life figures that look just like their animated film counterparts". The Mufasa "humanimal" measured 7 feet (2.1 m) long from tail to tip, 6 feet (1.8 m) feet tall, and was perched upon an 18-foot-tall (5.5 m) Pride Rock that rose from below the stage. The stage for the show was 125 feet (38 m) wide, and was bigger than the seating area in order to permit the use of giant sets. The attraction closed on February 23, 2002 to be replaced by Mickey's PhilharMagic.

== The Legend of The Lion King ==
The Legend of the Lion King

Disneyland Park (Paris)
- Area: Discoveryland
- Status: Removed
- Opening date: June 26, 2004
- Closing date: July 2009

Ride statistics
- Attraction type: Show
- Assistive listening available

The Legend of The Lion King at Disneyland Paris ran from 2004 to 2009 and played at the Videopolis Theater located in Discoveryland. This Broadway-style show used human actors, including some from the West End production of The Lion King, and featured popular songs from the movie. The show ran for 30 minutes and had performances in both English and French.

== The Lion King: Rhythms of the Pride Lands ==
The Lion King: Rhythms of the Pride Lands

Disneyland Park (Paris)
- Area: Frontierland
- Status: Operating
- Opening date: June 30, 2019 (first run); October 23, 2021 (second run)
- Closing date: September 22, 2019 (first run)
- Replaced: The Forest of Enchantment: A Disney Musical Adventure

Ride statistics
- Attraction type: Show

The Lion King: Rhythms of the Pride Lands debuted on June 30, 2019 at Disneyland Paris in the Frontierland Theater in Frontierland as part of "The Lion King & Jungle Festival". Disney describes the show as "a tribe of singers, dancers and acrobats dressed as Rafiki, Simba, Timon, Pumbaa, Nala, Mufasa and Scar brilliantly bring famous Pride Rock anthems to life."

Told in both English and Chansigne (a French sign language that interprets rhythms and song lyrics through interpretive hand movements), the show follows the story of The Lion King and features songs from both the film and the Broadway musical. The staging features a large, elaborate moving set based on djembe drums which rotate and tilt.

The show closed on September 22, 2019. It returned on 15 August 2020, but due to the COVID-19 pandemic, it was cancelled twice and eventually the run was ended early.

=== Soundtrack ===
A soundtrack for the show was released in 2020.

Track listing:

1. Nants' Ingonyama/Circle of Life – 3:44
2. I Just Can't Wait to Be King – 2:47
3. Be Prepared – 2:30
4. The Stampede – 1:42
5. Hakuna Matata – 2:41
6. One by One – 5:13
7. Shadowland – 2:52
8. Can You Feel the Love Tonight – 3:30
9. Endless Night/He Lives in You – 3:29
10. Simba Confronts Scar – 2:12
11. Finale (King of Pride Rock/Circle of Life) – 3:10

== Tale of the Lion King ==
Tale of the Lion King

Disney California Adventure
- Area: Paradise Gardens Park
- Status: Removed
- Opening date: June 7, 2019
- Closing date: September 2, 2019

Disneyland
- Area: Fantasyland
- Status: Removed
- Opening date: May 28, 2022
- Closing date: January 7, 2024
- Replaced: Mickey and the Magical Map
- Replaced by: Pixar Pals Playtime Party

Ride statistics
- Attraction type: Show

The Tale of the Lion King show at Disney California Adventure, which opened on June 7, 2019, features a narrator, Mwongozo (Swahili for "guide"), who leads a troupe of 18 performers called the "Storytellers of the Pride Lands". The performance is presented in a contemporary story-theater style that retells the plot of the film through language, song, and dance.

Following the Disneyland Resort’s reopening, the show relocated to the Fantasyland Theatre in Disneyland on May 28, 2022, where it ran through January 7, 2024.
