= Figment (Disney) =

Fictional character

- A Figment audio-animatronic on Journey Into Imagination
- First appearance: Journey Into Imagination (1983)
- Created by: Tony Baxter, Steve Kirk, and X Atencio
- Voiced by: Billy Barty (1983–1998); Corey Burton (1999–2001); Dave Goelz (2002–present); A.J. LoCascio (Disney Speedstorm, How Not to Draw)

Figment is a Disney character and mascot of the Imagination! pavilion at the Epcot theme park at Walt Disney World. He is a small purple dragon with a runaway imagination, which serves as a plot device in Journey into Imagination with Figment, the most recent edition of the pavilion, and he is featured in Epcot merchandise.

== History ==
Figment was created by Tony Baxter, who came up with the name "Figment" after watching an episode of Magnum, P.I., in which a goat has eaten Higgins' (John Hillerman) flowers and Higgins says, "Don't tell me [the goat is] a figment of my imagination. Figments don't eat rare tropical flowers".

The Imagination! pavilion opened with the rest of EPCOT Center on October 1, 1982, but the Journey Into Imagination dark ride did not open until March 5, 1983. In the original attraction, Dreamfinder, a jolly wizard-like scientist, teaches Figment how to use his imagination. Figment is meant to be the literal embodiment of the phrase "figment of the imagination". He is composed of various elements Dreamfinder found in his travels including two tiny wings, large yellow eyes, the horns of a steer (or dilemma, according to a 1983 appearance on the Today Show), a crocodile's snout, and the childish delight found at a birthday party. Figment is described in detail in the Dreamfinder's song "One Little Spark" (by the Sherman Brothers). Dreamfinder introduces him: "Two tiny wings, eyes big and yellow, horns of a steer, but a lovable fellow. From head to tail, he's royal purple pigment, and there, voila, you've got a Figment".

Though taking on many disguises within the attractions, including being a superhero, a cowboy, a knight, a skunk, a dancer, a mountain climber, and a pirate, Figment seems to have some special aspirations to be an astronaut, from being seen in a spacesuit in the original and current attractions to dialogue in the original stating "I wish I could be an astronaut. I bet I can use imagination to discover all kinds of new things!" Because of this, Figment is frequently portrayed in merchandising in a spacesuit, in addition to some of his other roles.

In 1999, Disney radically refurbished the Journey Into Imagination attraction as part of its Millennium Celebration at Epcot, removing Dreamfinder and Figment except for fleeting glimpses of the dragon. That version, titled Journey Into Your Imagination, was a completely new experience in which Dr. Nigel Channing (Eric Idle of Monty Python fame) led a tour of the fictional Imagination Institute. The Channing character originated in the adjacent Honey, I Shrunk the Audience 3D movie attraction.

In the current version, Figment's creativity has a bit of a larger effect on the world around him, be it transforming a large smell emitting machine into a slot machine, turning his house upside down, actually rearranging an otherwise static eye chart, and transforming the Institute into something almost reminiscent of the original in the finale. He can also pull a pair of glasses out of thin air to put onto Dr. Channing in the introduction and quickly change into a skunk costume in the Smell Lab.

After numerous complaints about the revamped attraction, including a Disney stockholder who questioned CEO Michael Eisner about Figment's absence during the company's annual shareholders meeting, a modest 2002 refurbishment modified the 1999 version to add the dragon as a playful foil for Dr. Channing throughout the Imagination Institute tour. The new version pointedly was branded Journey Into Imagination with Figment.

In the original attraction, Figment was voiced by Billy Barty; in the version in-between, Corey Burton portrayed Figment, and in the current version, Muppet performer Dave Goelz provides the voice, because Barty had died before the second version had shut down.

Outside the attractions at Epcot, Figment appeared in several Disney-produced educational short films in the late '80s, two of which featured Peter Pan and Alice from Alice in Wonderland (each played by a live-action actor), and has a brief cameo as a painting in the Pixar films Inside Out and Toy Story 4. Additionally, Disney and Marvel published Disney Kingdoms: Figment, a five-issue miniseries focused on the origins of Figment and Dreamfinder, starting in June 2014, which was followed up with a sequel Disney Kingdoms: Figment 2 in October 2015. Here Figment is portrayed as the childhood imaginary friend of struggling young inventor Blairion Mercurial, who is brought to life by his Mesmonic Spark Converter, a machine intended to turn one's thoughts into energy in a literal expression of brain power. After accidentally opening a portal into a fantastical realm of the imagination, Figment and Blair go on an adventure where the scientist learns to overcome his anxieties and come into his own as the Dreamfinder, returning home to London to save it from robots that emerged from the portal. After creating an unstable portal to absorb the machine army, they are transported to an Epcot-esque academy campus in Central Florida a century into the future. Dreamfinder's struggle to adapt to this new world and the mysterious disappearance of Spaceship Earth from the campus results in his self-doubt manifesting into a shadowy nightmare creature that possesses him and turns him into the Doubtfinder, leading Figment to find help in the form of Dreamfinder's great grand-niece Capri Harmony. Freeing Dreamfinder and the academy students from the Doubt and allowing them to harness the power of their own imaginations, Figment and Dreamfinder depart to search for the missing Spaceship Earth. A third series had been announced in 2016, but never materialized as a result of the Disney Kingdoms line's cancellation following the release of an Enchanted Tiki Room comic.

In 2017, Figment also made an appearance in the Guardians of the Galaxy Mission: Breakout! dark ride attraction in Disney California Adventure as a collector's item in the Collector's archive. In October 2024, it is revealed that Figment will make his overseas debut, with the modified Figment popcorn basket from 2022's Epcot International Festival of the Arts available for purchase in Shanghai Disneyland.

A live-action film centered around the character is currently in development at Disney, with Seth Rogen producing by his Point Grey Pictures production company and Dan Hernandez and Benji Samit writing the screenplay. In September 2026, Rogen confirmed that the film was still in active development at Walt Disney Pictures.

Figment was announced as an unlockable racer in the Disney Speedstorm arcade racing game and was introduced when the game launched in early access on April 18, 2023. He is voiced in the game by A.J. LoCascio. In March 2025, in honor of the ninth anniversary of the mobile game Disney Magic Kingdoms, Figment was added as a welcomable Character.

In March 2026, an episode from the Disney Television Animation short-series How Not To Draw starring Figment was released on the Disney Channel Animation YouTube channel, with LoCascio reprising the role of the character.

== Filmography ==
- Would You Eat a Blue Potato? (September 1988 – 15 min)
- What Can You See By Looking? (September 1988 – 15 min)
- Do Dragons Dream? (September 1988 – 15 min)
- How Does It Feel to Be an Elephant? (September 1988 – 15 min)
- How Does It Feel to Fly? (September 1988 – 14 min)
- How Does Sound Sound? (September 1988 – 14 min)
- Reading Magic with Figment and Peter Pan (August 1989 – 15 min)
- Writing Magic with Figment and Alice in Wonderland (August 1989 – 15 min)
- What's an Abra Without a Cadabra? (September 1989 – 15 min)
- Where Does Time Fly? (September 1989 – 17 min)
- Case of the Missing Space (September 1989 – 16 min)
- In-Development Figment Film Project (TBA)
