= Mickey's PhilharMagic =

3D attraction at Disney theme parks

- The entrance to Mickey's Philharmagic at Tokyo Disney Resort

Magic Kingdom
- Area: Fantasyland (Castle Courtyard)
- Status: Operating
- Opening date: October 8, 2003
- Replaced: Legend of The Lion King
- Lightning Lane Available

Hong Kong Disneyland
- Area: Fantasyland
- Status: Operating
- Opening date: September 12, 2005

Tokyo Disneyland
- Area: Fantasyland
- Status: Operating
- Opening date: January 24, 2011
- Replaced: Mickey Mouse Revue

Disneyland Park (Paris)
- Area: Discoveryland
- Status: Operating
- Opening date: October 1, 2018
- Replaced: Captain EO Tribute; Disney & Pixar: Short Film Festival; Star Wars: Path of the Jedi

Disney California Adventure
- Area: Hollywood Land
- Status: Operating
- Opening date: April 26, 2019
- Replaced: Muppet*Vision 3D (2001–2014); For the First Time in Forever: A Frozen Sing-Along Celebration (2015–2016)

Ride statistics
- Attraction type: 4-D film
- Designer: Walt Disney Imagineering; Walt Disney Animation Studios
- Model: Movie theater
- Theme: Animated Disney films
- Duration: 12 minutes
- Director: George Scribner
- Creative Consultants: Alex Mann; Rick Schneider-Calabash
- Sponsors: Kodak (Magic Kingdom, 2003–12)
- Wheelchair accessible
- Closed captioning available

Mickey's PhilharMagic is a 4D film attraction found at several Disney theme parks around the world, including Magic Kingdom theme park at the Walt Disney World Resort, Hong Kong Disneyland, Tokyo Disneyland, Disneyland Park (Paris), and Disney California Adventure. The film was directed by George Scribner, who also directed Disney's 1988 animated film Oliver & Company. Mickey's PhilharMagic is a 12-minute-long show featuring 3D effects, scents, and water, as well as a number of characters from Disney movies. It is shown on the largest purpose-built 3D screen ever made, at 150 feet wide.

The versions of the film at Disney California Adventure and Disneyland Paris were updated on July 17, 2021 with an additional scene based on Pixar's Coco, with the Magic Kingdom receiving the same update on November 12, 2021, as a part of the World's Most Magical Celebration, and in Tokyo Disneyland receiving the same update on September 15, 2022, and in Hong Kong Disneyland receiving the same update on June 12, 2025.

== Voice cast ==
- Wayne Allwine as Mickey Mouse
- Clarence Nash as Donald Duck (archival recordings)
  - Tony Anselmo as Donald Duck (five lines)
- Russi Taylor as Minnie Mouse
- Bill Farmer as Goofy
- Jerry Orbach as Lumiere
- Jodi Benson as Ariel
- Jason Marin as Flounder
- Jason Weaver as Simba
- Rowan Atkinson as Zazu
- Anthony Gonzalez as Miguel Rivera
- Gael García Bernal as Hector
- Blayne Weaver as Peter Pan
- Brad Kane as Aladdin
- Lea Salonga as Jasmine
- Gilbert Gottfried as Iago

== Locations ==
At Walt Disney World's Magic Kingdom, Mickey's PhilharMagic is located adjacent to Peter Pan's Flight and the Fantasy Faire shop in Fantasyland. This is the fourth attraction to utilize this show building. The theatre originally hosted the Mickey Mouse Revue. Later, it was the home to the 3-D film Magic Journeys, after it left Epcot's Journey into Imagination pavilion to make way for Captain EO. Most recently, it was home to the stage presentation Legend of The Lion King.

At Hong Kong Disneyland, Mickey's PhilharMagic takes place of the Fantasyland Concert Hall, which is located adjacent to Royal Banquet Hall in Fantasyland.

At Tokyo Disneyland, it takes the place of the Mickey Mouse Revue, which was originally located at Walt Disney World before moving to Tokyo Disneyland as one of its original attractions.

At Disneyland Park (Paris), it takes the place of Discoveryland Theatre, taking over from previous attractions like the Disney & Pixar Short Film Festival, Honey, I Shrunk the Audience! and Captain EO.

At Disney California Adventure, it takes place at Sunset Showcase Theater in Hollywood Land, taking over from previous attractions like the For the First Time in Forever: A Frozen Sing-Along Celebration and Muppet*Vision 3D.

== Songs ==
- "Be Our Guest" from Beauty and the Beast
- "The Sorcerer's Apprentice" from Fantasia and Fantasia 2000
- "Part of Your World" from The Little Mermaid
- "I Just Can't Wait to Be King" from The Lion King
- "Un Poco Loco" from Coco
- "You Can Fly!" from Peter Pan
- "A Whole New World" from Aladdin

== Development ==
The attraction is one of a small number of attractions in the Disney theme parks in which Walt Disney Imagineering has collaborated with another division of The Walt Disney Company – in this instance, it was Walt Disney Animation Studios. This same partnership developed the Fantasmic! shows at Disneyland and Disney's Hollywood Studios. Between the two companies, some of Disney's creative talent worked together. Including Disney veteran Alex Mann, who was instrumental in developing and scripting the final story. Legendary Disney animator Glen Keane re-animated Ariel from The Little Mermaid in 3D, returning after animating her in 2D in the original film. Nik Ranieri, supervising animator of Lumière in Beauty and the Beast, also returned to animate that character in 3D. Most of Donald Duck's dialogue are archival recordings by his original voice actor, Clarence Nash. Tony Anselmo, Donald's current voice actor, recorded new lines for the character for the Beauty and the Beast and Coco segments.

On July 1, 2021, it was announced a new scene would be added to the film featuring "Un Poco Loco" from Pixar's 2017 film Coco. The new segment was added to Disney California Adventure and Disneyland Paris on July 17, 2021, and in Magic Kingdom on November 12, 2021, coinciding with Walt Disney World's The World's Most Magical Celebration, and in Tokyo Disneyland on September 15, 2022. In January 2025, it was announced that the Hong Kong version of the attraction will receive the Coco scene and digital upgrades, in Hong Kong Disneyland on June 12, 2025.

== Plot synopsis ==
=== Outside the Queue Area ===
As the theater doors open, Mickey Mouse is performing with his PhilharMagic Orchestra at the Fantasyland Concert Hall (Orlando, Hong Kong, and Tokyo), Discoveryland Theatre (Paris), and Sunset Showcase Theater (Anaheim).

=== Inside the Queue Area ===
There are posters advertising the Concert Hall's past productions and performers, such as Hades from Hercules, Ariel and her sisters from The Little Mermaid, Genie from Aladdin, Héctor and Miguel from Coco, Wheezy from Toy Story 2, Willie the Whale from Make Mine Music, The Three Caballeros, The Big Bad Wolf and The Three Little Pigs.

=== The Theater's Lobby ===
Upon entering the theater's lobby, guests pick up their "opera glasses" (3D glasses). During their wait, guests hear orchestral music from Fantasia, Fantasia 2000, and other Disney animated films.

=== Concert Hall ===
Goofy, the Concert Hall's stage manager, admits the guests into the main theater, where final preparations for the performance are underway. After accidentally disturbing a cat, Goofy plugs in an electrical cord and gets electrocuted. After Minnie Mouse tells the guests to put on their "opera glasses", she realizes that Donald Duck has gone missing and goes to tell Mickey. Goofy then raises the curtains (despite Mickey protesting that they aren't ready yet, which Goofy does not hear) to reveal that the stage is empty, except for a conductor's podium and Donald, who is sleeping in a box. Mickey races onto the stage in a hurry, quickly telling Donald to unpack the instruments. Mickey places his famous Sorcerer's hat on the podium, then dashes off the stage to get his clothes, ordering Donald, "Don't forget the orchestra. And don't touch my hat!" After Donald wakes up, he immediately unpacks all the instruments, including a grand piano, from the small box, and sets up the stage, he is then tempted to try on the Sorcerer's Hat himself. He does so, disobeying Mickey's orders, which causes the magical instruments to come to life under his command and instead play an extremely unpleasant melody when Donald conducts. Donald tells the instruments to "stop it" and the instruments stop, except for a small flute whistling the "Mickey Mouse March", who messes with him and the instruments laugh at the antics. However, when Donald bullies the flute, the other instruments, immediately shocked and angered by Donald's antagonism, rise up and attack him (except for the piano, who instead charges at Donald), creating a battle cloud which then turns into a whirlwind of magic and music as the "Mickey Mouse March" plays. Donald loses the hat in the chaos as the whirlwind turns into a vortex of Disney animated features that sucks up him and everything surrounding it, passing through songs from different Disney and Pixar animated features while Donald tries to retrieve the hat.

After the vortex passes, Donald finds himself inside the dining room of the Beast’s Castle in Beauty and the Beast with Lumière, who begins to sing "Be Our Guest". Guests can smell the food through hidden smell cannons in the theater and feel blasts of wind when the champagne bottles pop through hidden air cannons in the back of the seats. After the song, Donald is sent to Fantasia and Fantasia 2000. Accompanied by the music from The Sorcerer's Apprentice, the Magic Brooms enter the room from a door, splashing water on Donald and washing away the dirty dishes left behind from the previous scene and the hat. The audience also gets blasted with water. A smaller broom than Donald comes in, carrying a big bucket. Donald snatches the bucket away and laughs, but only gives it back when a gigantic broom comes in. The giant broom spills water on Donald, transporting him underwater into The Little Mermaid, where Ariel is in her grotto with Flounder singing "Part of Your World". At the end of the song, an electric eel shocks Donald when he tries to kiss Ariel. Donald is then taken to The Lion King, where Simba is singing "I Just Can't Wait to Be King" amidst a menagerie of African plains animals rendered in a 3D paper cut-out style. Zazu also appears in this segment. Afterwards, Donald is sent into the Land of the Dead from Coco, where Miguel is singing "Un Poco Loco" alongside Héctor while skeletons dance to the music. During the concert, Dante places the hat on Donald's head, who then starts to dance with Miguel and Héctor, but Pepita then steals the hat while Donald holds onto her tail as they fly into the clouds. Then, Donald enters a starry night sky in London from Peter Pan, where the chorus sings "You Can Fly". Peter Pan and Tinker Bell sprinkle pixie dust on Donald, giving him the ability to fly. Finally, Donald gets swept into Agrabah from Aladdin, where Aladdin and Jasmine are singing "A Whole New World" while flying through the night sky on Carpet. Donald follows them on a magic carpet of his own. He eventually retrieves the hat again by Jasmine placing it on his head. However, the hat gets knocked off of Donald's head by Iago, and Donald jumps after it.

Donald and the hat descend back into the vortex, which returns them to the stage. Mickey returns, puts on the hat, and uses its powers to restore order, before sternly looking at Donald for disobeying his orders not to touch his hat. As Mickey finally conducts the orchestra, playing a reprise of the "Mickey Mouse March", the flute that Donald bullied earlier knocks Donald into a tuba. As a fitting end, the tuba launches Donald across the theater and into its back wall. Mickey takes a bow and signs off as the curtains close. Donald's rear, appearing as an animatronic, is shown stuck in the back wall before eventually falling through the hole. This is not shown in the Paris version. Instead, extended applause is heard and Minnie thanks the guests for coming to the show.

=== Gift Shop ===
Should guests pass by the gift shop, they can find Donald hanging from the ceiling while entangled in a tuba. At the back of the gift shop is a hole blown in the wall that Donald had plowed through after falling through the theater's back wall.

== See also ==
- 2011 in amusement parks
