= Imageworks =

Imageworks may refer to:

- Sony Pictures Imageworks, a visual effects and character animation company headquartered in Vancouver, British Columbia, Canada
- Image Works, a video game publisher in the late-1980s and early-1990s
- ImageWorks (Disney), an interactive area at Epcot's Imagination! pavilion
- Baltimore Productions / Imageworks, a 1980s music industry promotion company
- The Image Works, a stock photography company headquartered in Woodstock, New York, USA
