= The Funny Company =

- Title card
- Written by: Kenneth C.T. Snyder
- Voices of: Dick Beals; Robie Lester; Nancy Wible; Ken Snyder; Tom Thomas; Hal Smith
- Opening theme: "The Funny Company Theme Song"
- Ending theme: "The Funny Company Theme Song" (reprise)
- Composer: Jack Fascinato
- Country of origin: United States
- Original language: English

Production
- Executive producer: Kenneth C.T. Snyder
- Producer: Sam Nicholson
- Animators: Bob Bemiller; Brad Case; John Sparey; John Walker
- Editor: Norm Vizents
- Running time: Around 5 minutes 20 seconds
- Production company: Funny Company Films

Original release
- Network: syndication
- Release: September 21, 1963

The Funny Company is an American animated cartoon produced in 1963 and seen in syndication. Ken Snyder and Charles Koren produced 260 six-minute-long episodes (they later would create the cult favorite Roger Ramjet). The Mattel Corporation provided financial backing. Snyder conceived the program in response to then-Federal Communications Commission (FCC) chairman Newton N. Minow's call for more educational children's programs.

== Plot ==
The Funny Company group resembled a club not unlike a Junior Achievement organization, that had a noseless smiley face used as the club logo; and most of the time, the stories would revolve around the Company being hired for different jobs to make a little money (yard work, house cleaning, babysitting, etc.) or doing something for charity (such as putting on shows). As time went on, the Company decided to make Shrinkin' Violette a movie star and were on their way to Hollywood.

Members included leader Buzzer Bell (rarely seen without his Funny Company cap), inventor Jasper N (for National) Parks, club secretary Polly Plum, rotund Merry Twitter (the giggly Betty Boop-soundalike club treasurer), club mascot Terry Dactyl (an actual pterodactyl, who was frozen many years ago in prehistoric times), shy Shrinkin' Violette (who could literally become smaller if she became embarrassed), and two Native American adults--Super Chief (named after the Santa Fe Railroad's crack passenger train) whose voice was an air horn of a single-chime railroad locomotive, and his translator Broken Feather. Another adult lending a hand was Professor Todd Goodheart with his supercomputer, the Weisenheimer.

The "Villainous Meanie" of the show, Belly Laguna (who was modelled after Hungarian-American actor Bela Lugosi, in his famous Dracula role) always tried to thwart the Funny Company's plans (for his own profit), but without any success. Another, less frequently seen adversary was a German-accented mad scientist type, Professor Ludwig Von Upp with his assistant Hans Von Henchman.

Each segment included a two-minute live-action short educational film, reinforcing the topic being discussed. Initially produced in black and white, the series switched after one season to full color, the closing credits ended with the message, "Keep Smiling!"

== Syndication ==
The series was originally syndicated to local stations around the country, normally as part of a locally-produced children's show. The show first aired on both ABC and NBC affiliate (now only NBC) KOMU-TV Channel 8 in Jefferson City, Missouri on September 21, 1963, and was later carried on WOR-TV New York City three days later.

Formerly throughout its history, The Funny Company was broadcast on TBN's Smile of a Child TV network (now Smile) early on Monday mornings and late Friday nights until the show was pulled off the air in June 2016. This series was also known as a Chicago television original, especially on WGN-TV's Garfield Goose and Friends and in the 1980s on WPWR-TV.

The series sold internationally and ran for several years in Ireland and Australia.

The series was exported to Japan and was dubbed into Japanese. being broadcast on Tokyo 12 Channel (now TV Tokyo) from April 13 to July 17, 1964, running from 6:20 PM to 6:30 PM .

== Voice cast ==
- Dick Beals—Buzzer Bell, Jasper N. Parks
- Robie Lester—Polly Plum
- Nancy Wible—Merry Twitter, Shrinkin' Violette
- Ken Snyder—Terry Dactyl, Additional voices (also producer)
- Tom Thomas—Broken Feather, Additional voices
- Hal Smith—Dr. Todd Goodheart, Dr. Ludwig Von Upp, Belly Laguna, Weisenheimer, Hans Von Henchman, Additional voices

== Credits ==
- Executive Producer: Kenneth C.T. Snyder
- Producer: Sam Nicholson
- Co-Producer: Leo Salkin
- Written and Created by Kenneth C.T. Snyder
- Musical Direction: Jack Fascinato
- Animators: Bob Bemiller, Brad Case, John Sparey, John Walker
- Layout: Norm Gottfredson
- Backgrounds: Rosemary O'Connor
- Animation Checking: Maggi (Alcumbrac) Raymond
- Picture and Sound Editor: Norm Vizents
- Production Coordinator: Dave Hoffman
