= Magic Journeys =

1982 3D film directed by Murray Lerner

- Attraction poster for Magic Journeys

Epcot
- Area: Future World, Journey Into Imagination Pavilion
- Status: Removed
- Opening date: October 1, 1982
- Closing date: February 9, 1986
- Replaced by: Captain EO

Disneyland
- Area: Tomorrowland
- Status: Removed
- Opening date: June 16, 1984
- Closing date: July 1986
- Replaced by: Captain EO

Tokyo Disneyland
- Area: Tomorrowland
- Status: Removed
- Opening date: January 17, 1985
- Closing date: 1987
- Replaced: Eternal Seas
- Replaced by: Captain EO

Magic Kingdom
- Area: Fantasyland
- Status: Removed
- Opening date: December 15, 1987
- Closing date: December 1, 1993
- Replaced: Mickey Mouse Revue
- Replaced by: Legend of the Lion King (1994–2002); Mickey's PhilharMagic (2003–present)

Ride statistics
- Attraction type: 3D Film
- Designer: Walt Disney Imagineering; Eastman Kodak (Note: Animation produced by Triple-I, and titles designed by Van Der Veer Photo Effects.)
- Theme: The world through the eyes of a child
- Music: "Magic Journeys" written by the Sherman Brothers (music & lyrics)
- Duration: 16:00
- Directed by: Murray Lerner

Magic Journeys was a 3D film created by WED Enterprises for presentation at Disney theme parks. It was featured at four different parks over the course of its 11-year run.

== History ==
On October 1, 1982, Magic Journeys premiered as one of the opening-day attractions at the Journey Into Imagination pavilion in Walt Disney World's EPCOT Center. It was written and directed by Murray Lerner and featured a song composed by Robert and Richard Sherman. A preshow presentation, anchored by another Sherman Brothers song, "Makin' Memories", played before the film during its EPCOT Center run.

Starting on June 16, 1984, it began a two-year run at Disneyland, first on the outdoor Space Stage and then inside the newly constructed Magic Eye Theater in Tomorrowland. In early 1986, the film was removed from Disneyland and EPCOT Center in order to make way for a new 3-D film, Captain EO.

In December 1987, Magic Journeys returned to Walt Disney World at the Fantasyland Theater inside the Magic Kingdom, where it was paired with the 1953 3-D short Working for Peanuts. The film played in this venue for six years until it closed in December 1993 in order to make room for Legend of the Lion King.

== Plot ==
Magic Journeys looked at the world through the eyes of a child. The film started with children running through a meadow and looking at clouds. Someone blew on a dandelion and the seeds then flew away, turning into stars and then turned into the sun. Next the kids were seen flying a kite at the beach. The kite then turned into a bird, a fish, a school of fish, a flock of birds, bird wings, a Pegasus, a horse and then finally into a merry-go-round. While the children rode the carousel, they began reaching for a brass ring spinning next to the carousel; the carousel spins around the moon and bats fly out past the riders. The moon becomes a witch, a mask, an Olmec head, and more until turning into a cat. A boy reaches out to the cat and it turns into the Sphinx, which turns into a lion jumping through a hoop in the circus. Trapeze artists and acrobats fly through the air and several clowns amuse the children. The circus then gives way to reveal it as only a miniature with small flying machines coming up through the roof of the room into the stars. The kids move through a room of balloons and encounter a magician. At the end of this act, the room gives way as the kids descend through a starscape and return to the meadow with the dandelion unblowing itself.

== Cast ==
- Phil Baron as Magician
- Michelle Baron as Female Funambulist

== Soundtrack ==
The film's preshow song, "Makin' Memories" and the film's theme song, "Magic Journeys", can be found on the 1991 CD The Official Album of Disneyland and Walt Disney World. Both songs also appear on the album The Sherman Brothers Songbook.

== See also ==
- Epcot attraction and entertainment history
- Magic Kingdom attraction and entertainment history
- List of 3D films
- List of past Disneyland attractions
- Tokyo Disneyland attraction and entertainment history
- Sherman Brothers
