= Mickey Mouse Revue =

Attraction at Disney theme parks

The Mickey Mouse Revue
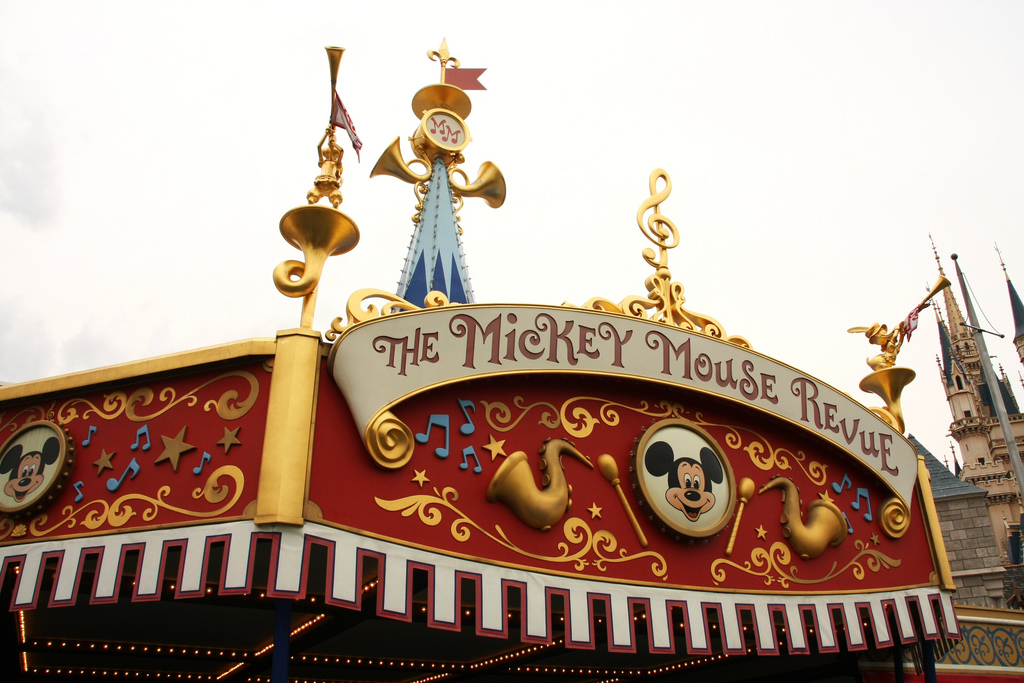
- Mickey Mouse Revue at Tokyo Disneyland

Magic Kingdom
- Area: Fantasyland
- Status: Removed
- Opening date: October 1, 1971
- Closing date: December 14, 1983
- Replaced by: Magic Journeys

Tokyo Disneyland
- Area: Fantasyland
- Status: Removed
- Opening date: April 15, 1983
- Closing date: December 25, 2009
- Replaced by: Mickey's PhilharMagic

Ride statistics
- Attraction type: Audio-Animatronic stage show
- Theme: Walt Disney Animation Studios

The Mickey Mouse Revue was an indoor audio-animatronic stage show at the Magic Kingdom and Tokyo Disneyland theme parks. It was one of the three original opening day attractions in Magic Kingdom's Fantasyland in 1971. After closing at Magic Kingdom in 1980, it was moved to Tokyo Disneyland for that park's opening in 1983 where it remained for 26 years before closing permanently in 2009.

The basic premise of the show was a musical concert, in which Mickey Mouse conducted an orchestra made up of various Disney characters.

== Attraction ==
=== Pre-show ===
Before the concert, guests are loaded into a theater featuring an eight-minute film detailing the history of Mickey's illustrious career and the use of sound in his films, from his debut in Steamboat Willie to his role in the feature Fantasia. The film ends with footage of Mickey and his friends dancing at Disneyland, as Mickey then tells the guests that it is time for the main show.

=== Concert ===
After a cast member recites the theater's safety spiel, the house curtains open to reveal maestro Mickey Mouse and an orchestra made up of various Disney characters. After Mickey gives his count-off, the orchestra performs a medley of Disney songs ("Heigh-Ho", "Whistle While You Work", "When You Wish Upon a Star", and "Hi-Diddle-Dee-Dee"). After they finish, they are lowered into the orchestra pit as the theater falls into darkness.

A spotlight is projected onto the side curtains, depicting a shadow of the Big Bad Wolf sneaking into the set. Afterward, a side curtain opens to reveal a scene from Three Little Pigs that takes place in Practical Pig's brick house, in which the pigs play and sing "Who's Afraid of the Big Bad Wolf?"

The next act depicts scenes from Snow White and the Seven Dwarfs; the first has Snow White singing "I'm Wishing" to a group of forest animals, while the second features the Seven Dwarfs performing "The Silly Song" in their cottage.

On the far right of the stage, a scene from Alice in Wonderland appears, depicting Alice singing "All in the Golden Afternoon" along with a garden of live flowers as they sway in time with the song.

In the following act, The Three Caballeros appear to sing their theme song, with Donald Duck on maracas, José Carioca on guitar, and Panchito firing his pistols. Throughout their act, the trio disappears and reappears in various spots around the theater.

On the far left of the stage, a scene from Cinderella shows up, and the Fairy Godmother sings "Bibbidi-Bobbidi-Boo" while she magically transforms Cinderella's rags into a sparkling ballgown. After the scene fades out, a spotlight is produced on the side curtains, depicting Cinderella and her Prince Charming waltzing to "So This Is Love".

For the grand finale, Br'er Rabbit, Br'er Fox and Br'er Bear appear to sing "Zip-a-Dee-Doo-Dah", while Mickey and the orchestra rise from their pit. As they play, characters from the previous acts reappear to join in the song, and the side curtains part to reveal a bright, sunny field as a rainbow gleams over the horizon. Once the performance concludes, the performers solemnly wrap up by singing the "Mickey Mouse March", while the lights fade until there is only a spotlight shining on Mickey, who turns his direction to the audience, and takes a bow as all the other characters vanish from the show.

Mickey thanks the audience for watching the show and bids farewell. The house curtains close, and the cast member recites another spiel as the guests exit the theater.

== History ==
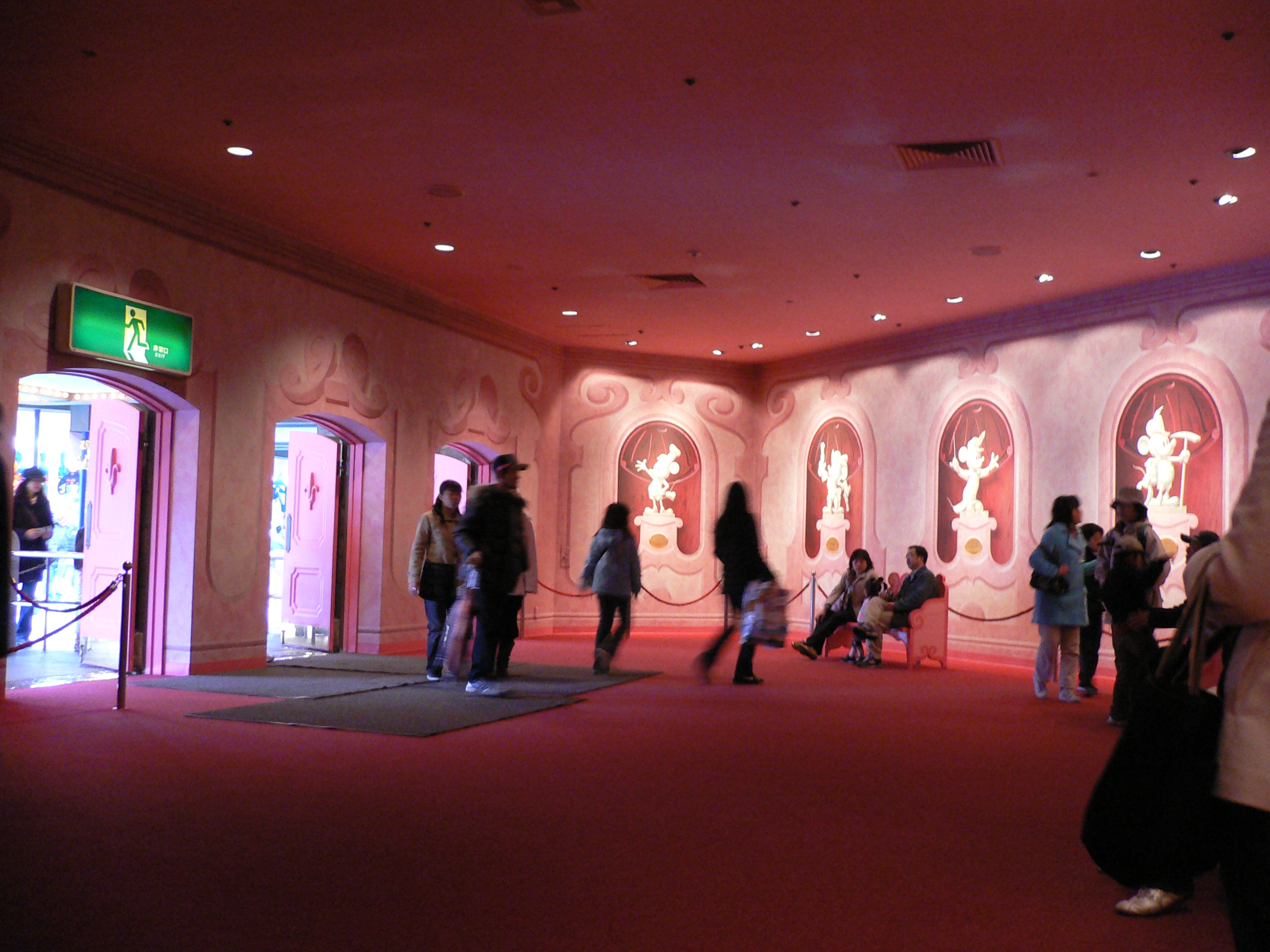
The preshow area at Mickey Mouse Revue in Tokyo Disneyland

In a 1962 interview, Walt Disney talked about his new audio-animatronic technology in The Enchanted Tiki Room and untitled haunted house attraction. He said that he had similar plans for "all the Disney characters". Contributing Disney Imagineers were John Hench, Bill Justice, and Wathel Rogers.

The original theater at Walt Disney World sat 500 park guests, but the pre-show area only had room for 300, which was a planning mistake.

The animatronic Mickey currently resides in the Walt Disney Archives, and was put on display at the D23 Expo in 2011.

The animatronics of Donald, José and Panchito were put on display at D23's Destination D: Walt Disney World 40th event. In 2015, the figures were redressed and placed into the finale of Epcot's Gran Fiesta Tour attraction following a refurbishment in December of that year.

== Cast ==
- Mickey Mouse – conductor
- Minnie Mouse – violin
- Daisy Duck – cello
- Pluto – high-hat cymbal
- Goofy – string bass
- Huey, Dewey, and Louie – trumpets
- Ludwig Von Drake – ukulele
- The Mad Hatter – bass clarinet
- The March Hare – helps with bass clarinet
- Dormouse – pops up out of the bass clarinet
- Winnie the Pooh – kazoo
- Rabbit – slide whistle
- Piglet – harmonica
- Monty (city mouse) – clarinet
- Abner (country mouse) – saxophone
- Jaq and Gus – trombone
- Dumbo – tuba
- Timothy Mouse – helps with tuba
- Kaa – his own tail
- King Louie – xylophone, timpani, etc.
- Baloo – flute

== Songs ==
- "Overture: Heigh-Ho/Whistle While You Work/When You Wish Upon a Star/Hi-Diddle-Dee-Dee"
- "Who's Afraid of the Big Bad Wolf?" – The Three Little Pigs
- "I'm Wishing" – Snow White
- "The Silly Song" – The Seven Dwarfs
- "All in the Golden Afternoon" – Alice and The Flowers
- "The Three Caballeros" – Donald Duck, José Carioca, and Panchito Pistoles
- "Bibbidi-Bobbidi-Boo" – Fairy Godmother
- "So This Is Love" – Cinderella and Prince Charming
- "Zip-a-Dee-Doo-Dah" – Br'er Rabbit, Br'er Fox, and Br'er Bear, later joined by the rest of the cast
- "Mickey Mouse Alma Mater" – Chorus
- "Exit Music: Casey, Jr./The Work Song/Mickey Mouse March/You Can Fly!/A Spoonful of Sugar"

== See also ==
- List of Magic Kingdom attractions
- List of Tokyo Disneyland attractions
