= Robie Lester =

American voice actress and singer (1925–2005)

- Also known as: Vivian Joyce Findell; Roby Charmandy
- Born: Vivian Joyce Chamandy; March 23, 1925; Megargel, Texas, U.S.
- Died: June 14, 2005 (aged 80) Burbank, California, U.S.
- Occupations: Voice actress; singer; actress
- Years active: 1958–2002
- Labels: Liberty; Warner Brothers; A&M; Disney

Robie Lester (March 23, 1925 – June 14, 2005) was an American voice artist, actress, and singer, best known as the voice of "Miss Jessica" in the Rankin/Bass animated special Santa Claus is Comin' to Town, the singing voice of Eva Gabor in Disney's The Aristocats and The Rescuers, and the original "Disneyland Story Reader" for Walt Disney Records read-alongs.

== Early life ==
Lester was born in Megargel, Texas, and raised in Northern Ontario, Canada. After a few years in Detroit, she joined the US Army Air Corps before attending UCLA with a major in music. In Hollywood, she worked with Henry Mancini and Herb Alpert, recorded for Liberty, Warner Brothers and A&M, and sang demos for songwriters. At A&M Records Lester recorded one of her most frequently heard, though uncredited, contributions—singing in Spanish behind the narrated portion of the Sandpipers' 1966 hit "Guantanamera".

== Career ==
=== Work in commercials ===
Lester was one of the busiest voice-over artists in early 1960s commercials, working in many commercials for Kellogg's breakfast cereal. She was first heard as both of Toucan Sam's infant nephews, with Sam played by Mel Blanc. She also voiced one of the two battling Smackin' Brothers for Sugar Smacks, and sang the commercial's jingle.

=== Story reader for Disney ===
In the early 1960s, Disney songwriters Richard and Robert Sherman brought Lester to the attention of Disney's in-house record label. Lester's voice was heard as narrator and singer on dozens of Disney's children's records. One such record was The Story and Song of the Haunted Mansion which also featured the voices of Thurl Ravenscroft and Ron Howard. Her singing voice was heard on the song "Hippity Hop" from the Disney album Peter Cottontail and Other Funny Bunnies. Beginning in 1965, Lester was the "Disneyland Story Reader" on records where she read the stories, acted out all the parts and reminded children to "turn the page" in their accompanying booklet. Her famous phrase "...when Tinker Bell rings her little bells like this (wind chimes)...turn the page" was heard by countless children of a generation. She also provided the voice of Piglet on some of the early Winnie the Pooh records. In Mouse Tracks: The Story of Walt Disney Records, authors Tim Hollis and Greg Ehrbar state, "It is impossible to calculate how many lives Robie Lester touched by singing, acting, and narrating on more individual Disneyland records than any other performer."

=== Television and films ===
One of her most famous roles was as "Miss Jessica", the schoolteacher who becomes Mrs. Kris Kringle (Santa Claus) in the 1970 Rankin/Bass TV special Santa Claus Is Comin' to Town. In the Christmas special, Lester sang a powerful ballad entitled "My World Is Beginning Today" in which her character literally lets her hair down and comes to the aid of her future husband, Kris Kringle.

Robie Lester provided the singing voice for Vera Ralston in Accused of Murder and for Eva Gabor's animated characters in Disney's The Aristocats (Duchess) and The Rescuers (Miss Bianca). Other credits included vocal performances in House of Bamboo and Lisbon (both as Roby Charmandy), The Three Lives of Thomasina, The Famous Adventures of Mr. Magoo, The City That Forgot About Christmas, Devlin, and The Funny Company (as Polly Plum). She also contributed uncredited vocals to other films and television shows, and had small roles in The Sword of Ali Baba, The Ghost and Mrs. Muir, That Girl, and Night Gallery.

The Disney Storyteller Series album, The Story of the Aristocats, was nominated for a 1971 Grammy Award.

=== Record producer ===
In the early 1960s, she formed Mary Music, Funco Publishing, and Golden Key for record production and distribution. She personally produced multiple releases on the Bonanza and Musikon labels.

=== Later years ===
Lester spent her final years in Fillmore, California, fund raising and crusading for animal rights. She published two novels: The Twenty Dollar Christmas (1996) and Heaven's Gift (1999). She also gratefully discovered a fan base that had grown up with her work. Her last voice performance was in 2002 for the Adventures in Odyssey radio series.

Robie Lester died on June 14, 2005, of cancer at St. Joseph's Hospital in Burbank, California, at age 80. She was married to producer Geoff Eccleston, had one daughter Mindy, and three grandchildren.

Her autobiography, Lingerie For Hookers In The Snow: An Audiography Of A Voice Artist, was published in 2006.

== Non-Disney discography ==
=== Singles ===
- "Give"/"Too Late" (Century 714, 1955) (as Roby Charmandy)
- "With You Where You Are"/"Listen To The Wind (My Love)" (Liberty 55033, 1956) (Note: Both sides with Gaylord Carter and his Orchestra.) (Note: The "Reviews of New Pop Records" section of the December 15, 1956, issue of Billboard magazine reviewed both tracks. For "With You Where You Are" the magazine noted, "Here's a harmony dual-tracking job by the gal on a bouncy tune. Songstress has an easygoing style with potential to break thru on future sides." On "Listen To The Wind": "The new thrush offers a slightly mystical, minor-key ballad that has charm. Organ backup makes the whispering wind sound.")
- "My Love And I"/"Whispering Guitar" (Liberty 55083, 1957) (Note: Both tracks "with the Spencer-Hagen Orchestra." From the "Pop Talent" section of the July 1, 1957, issue of Billboard magazine: "Another important chunk of talent blooms here. First, Miss Lester pours out healthy emotion on the pretty tune with a strong lyric. Song has a tasty arrangement and it's in the teen groove. Flip is a charmingly chanted waltz. Sides are strong and the talent figures to move out on these and on future wax.")
- "I'm Sorry, I Want A Ferrari" / "It Takes Love To Make A Home" (Mira 112, 1959) (Note: B-side by The Gould Singers; both sides with Danny Gould and Orchestra. Both songs from the 1959 film Never Steal Anything Small.)
- "The Chimney Sweep"/"The Tree And The Sea" (Cascade CA-5901, 1959) (Note: "Reviews of New Pop Records" section of the February 16, 1959, issue of Billboard magazine said of "The Tree and the Sea", "Miss Lester offers a sweet-voiced interpretation of this pretty ballad with choral effects and the concerto sound in the piano. Gal has pleasant sound somewhat in the Gogi Grant style. Comments on "The Chimney Sweep" follow: "This is an interesting medium-rhythm tune with Miss Lester again coming thru in good style with an interesting percussion sound in the backing. A talented thrush." Both sides written by Al De Lory and Joe Van Winkle. Also released in France on America 45 M 52 in 1959.)
- "The Ballad of Cheatin' John"/"The Miracle Of Life" (Note: Although originally released as the B-side song, "The Miracle Of Life" on the Lute label "bubbled under" at #107 on the Billboard Hot 100 chart for April 25, 1960. Also tabbed as a "Good Sales Potential" item in the March 28, 1960, issue of Billboard magazine with comment, "An inspirational side. Lyric carries a message -- the miracle of life. Chick's vocal is a good one, backed by violin and chorus." Song written by Morey Bernstein.) (Lute L-5904, 1960) (Note: Also released on Finer Arts FA-1004 (1961), Polydor (UK) NH 66963 (1961), and Landa 681 (1962). Flip side "The Ballad of Cheatin' John" written by Don Ralke and By Dunham.)
- "Green Flamingo" (Note: "Pick of the Week" by DJ Bob Hudson of WCIN in the May 29, 1965, issue of Billboard magazine. Written by Wayne Shanklin, eden ahbez, and Lee Esmond. Flip side "Another Show Another Town" written by Van Winkle-Darian. Both tracks produced by J. R. Shanklin.)/"Another Show Another Town" (Chattahoochee CH-680, 1965)
- "One Step Away From Heaven" (Note: Performed on Shivaree January 8, 1965 (episode #50).)/"Little Star" (Dot 45-16798, 1965)
- "The Party's Over" (Note: From the 1956 musical Bells Are Ringing.)/"Wait For Him" (Interlude 201, 1966)

=== Compilation appearances ===
- Terribly Sophisticated Songs: A Collection of Unpopular Songs for Popular People (Warner Brothers Records B1210, 1958) -- "I'm Filled With That Empty Feeling", "Just My Sol"
- The Whimsical World of Irving Taylor (Warner Bros. Records WS 1352, 1959) -- "Domestic Wine"
- The Charles H. Stern Agency, Inc., Presents the "In" Sound (Private Press, 1967) -- jingle samples
- About, Volume 3: Fairy Tales ꞏ Poems ꞏ Songs (Columbia CR 21535, 1968) -- "Sleepy Time", "The Owl and the Pussycat", "Wynken, Blynken and Nod", "Calico Pie"
- The Aristocats and Other Cat Songs (Disneyland Records 1333, 1970) -- "Scales And Arpeggios", "She Never Felt Alone", "Siamese Cat Song" (Note: The 1996 CD reissue (Walt Disney Records 60904-7) titled Songs From The Aristocats includes only "She Never Felt Alone". The 2015 2-CD Legacy Collection Edition (Universal) includes additional tracks and alternate versions.)
- House of Bamboo Soundtrack (Intrada Records ISC 30, 2006) -- "House of Bamboo", "Be Still, Little Voice"
- The Sherman Brothers Songbook (Walt Disney Records 5819506), 2009 -- "She Never Felt Alone"
- Cult Hits of the 1960s, Volume 5 (Fervor Records, 2013, Internet release) -- "Ever Blue", "A Life to Live Over" (both previously unreleased)
- Bubbling Under: The American Charts 1959-1963 (Fantastic Voyage FVTD212, 2016) -- "The Miracle of Life"
- Eden's Island: The Music of an Enchanted Isle (Everland Music EPS 010YG, 2022 reissue) —- "Green Flamingo"

Discography notes
