= Imagination! (Epcot) =

Pavilion at Epcot

- The pavilion logo, a throwback to the classic Journey into Imagination logo The attraction's logotype, used (with updates) since 1999

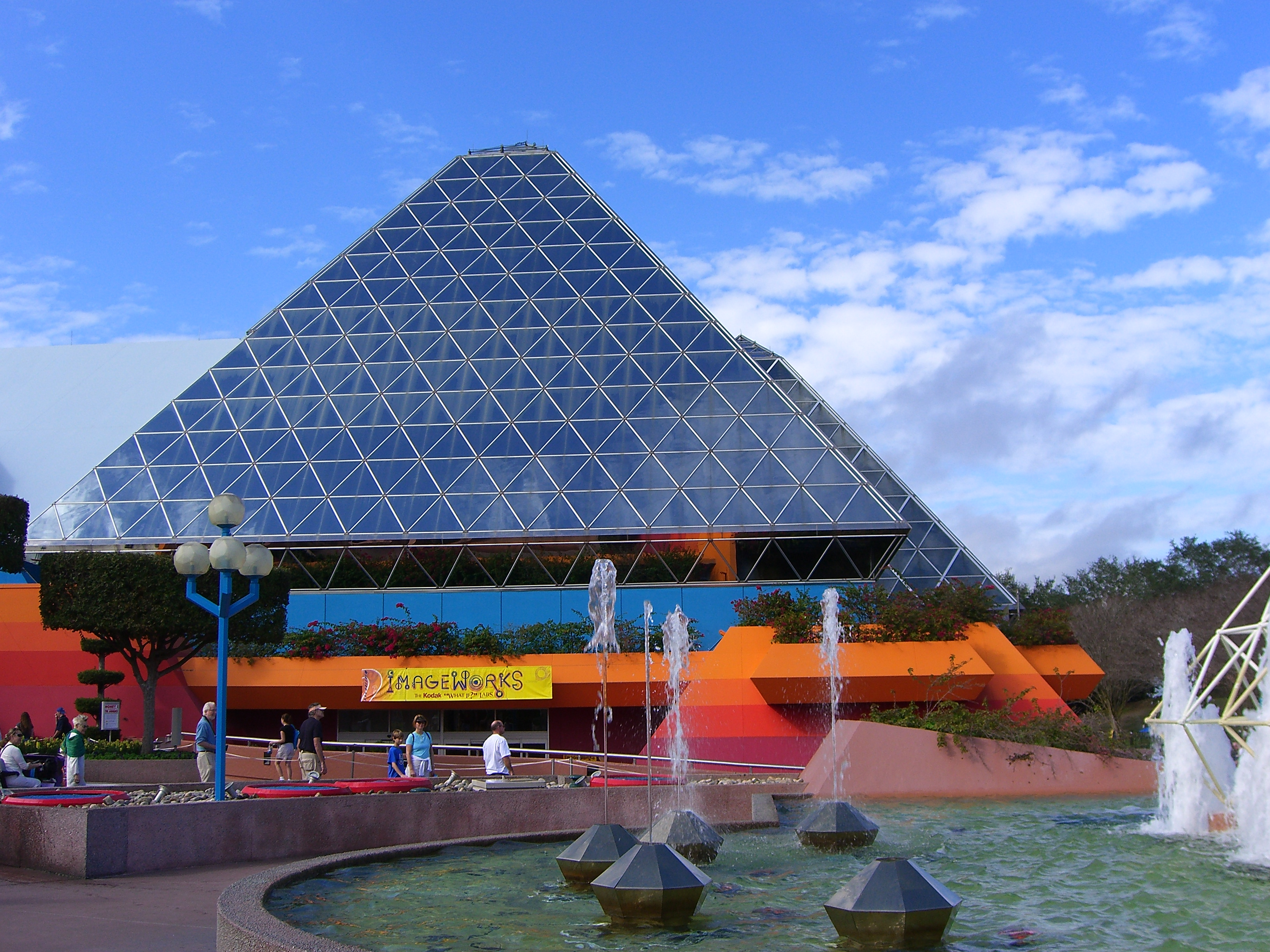
- Glass pyramids of Imagination! with the jumping fountains in the foreground.

Epcot
- Area: Future World (1982–2021); World Celebration (2021–)
- Coordinates: 28.372876°N 81.551203°W
- Status: Operating
- Cost: $38,000,000
- Opening date: October 1, 1982

Ride statistics
- Designer: WED Enterprises
- Theme: Human imagination, creativity, and the arts
- Sponsor: Kodak (1982–2010); None (since 2010)
- Wheelchair accessible

Imagination! (formerly Journey Into Imagination) is a pavilion located in the World Celebration section of Epcot, a theme park at the Walt Disney World Resort in Bay Lake, Florida. The pavilion opened with the park in 1982, and is themed to human imagination, creativity, and the arts. Kodak was the former title sponsor of the pavilion.

== Attraction history ==
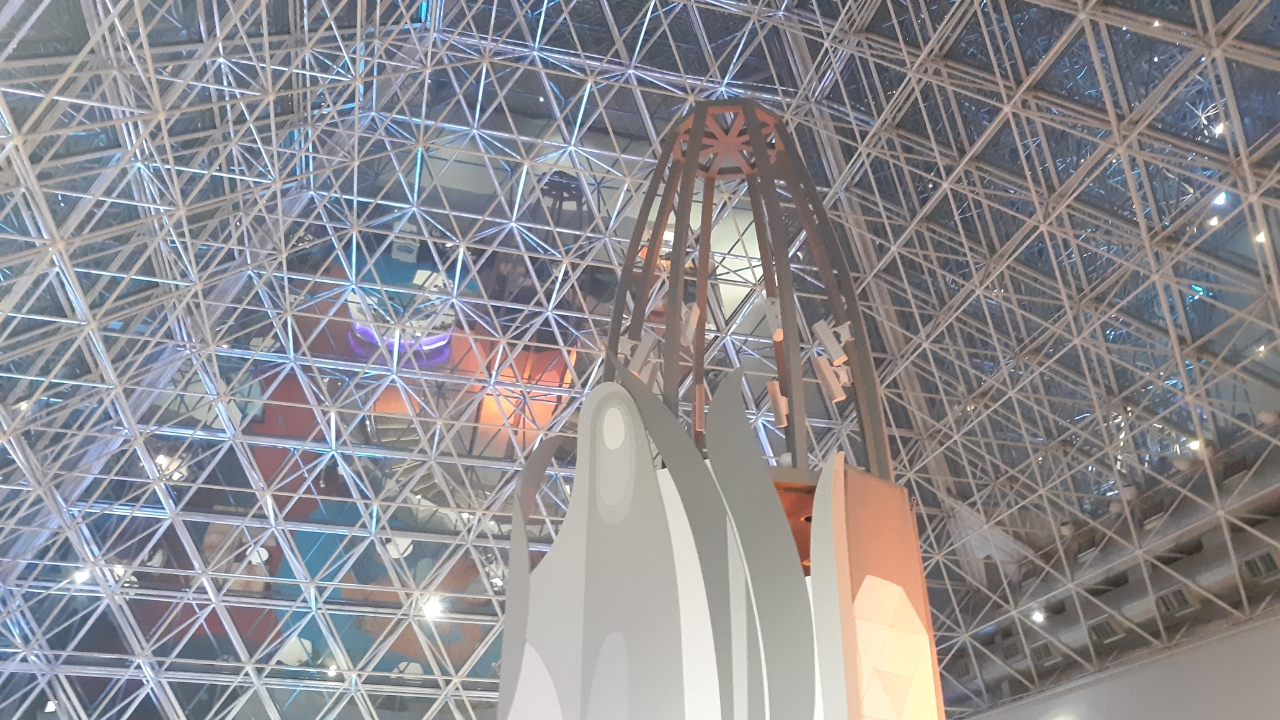
The interior of the glass pyramid as of 2026.

While the pavilion itself has existed since 1982, it has gone through three significant phases. The original started out as an area in which the 3D film Magic Journeys was played with a song by the same name by the Sherman Brothers. The Makin' Memories slide presentation, a history of photography was the pre-show presentation. When Journey Into Imagination opened a year later, the area was dubbed the Journey Into Imagination Pavilion. From 1983 to 1986, it held Journey Into Imagination, the (upstairs) ImageWorks, and Magic Journeys. In 1986, however, Magic Journeys was replaced by Captain EO, a more advanced 3D film created by George Lucas and starring Michael Jackson as the title character. In the mid-1990s, Captain EO was replaced by Honey, I Shrunk the Audience!, starring Rick Moranis as Professor Wayne Szalinski and Eric Idle as the Imagination Institute chairman, Dr. Nigel Channing.

In 1998, the original Journey Into Imagination went down for renovation. During this renovation, the upstairs ImageWorks was closed and the building's purple and blue painting exterior was replaced with different colors, navy blue being primary. The original glass sign was replaced by one made of wood and metal. The leap frog fountains were reduced in size to accommodate the new gift shop at the exit of the new Journey Into Your Imagination. The glass pyramids remained intact, although the upstairs ImageWorks was closed, to be replaced by the downstairs ImageWorks - The "What If" Labs

The pavilion was renamed Imagination! in 1999, when the new attraction opened. Fans were upset that Dreamfinder, a popular character from the previous ride, was gone. Furthermore, Figment, another popular character, only made cameo appearances until his short dialogue at the end of the ride. By the end of 2001, Disney closed the ride and modified the attraction, bringing Figment back into a more prominent role, although the Dreamfinder remained absent.

For a brief time after Figment's return to the Imagination pavilion, the walk around Figment character was available for a meet-and-greet in the former Kodak shop between the main pavilion and the theater. Figment's place is now unlabeled, but the décor inside is still visible through the windows.

In the summer of 2006, the finale of a Kim Possible interactive activity was set up temporarily in the upstairs ImageWorks as a test, themed as Dr. Drakken's base, with a station in World Showcase loaning out "Kimunicators" for interactive activities.

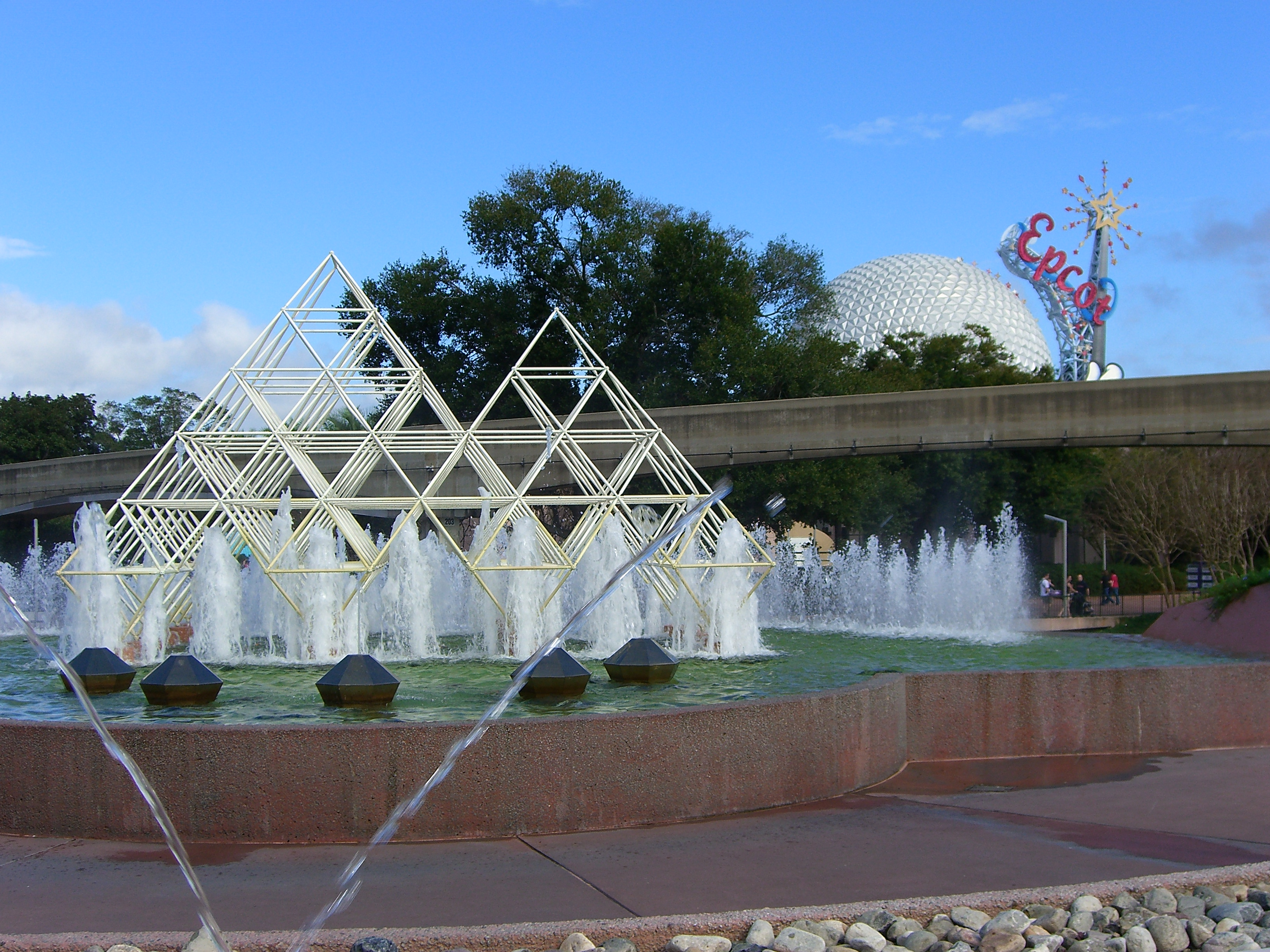
Jumping fountains near the Imagination! building with Spaceship Earth in the background.

Following the death of Michael Jackson on June 25, 2009, Disney officials mulled over the possible return of Captain EO. In February 2010, the film, now retitled Captain EO Tribute, returned to Disneyland. On July 2, 2010, Captain EO returned to the Imagination! pavilion for a limited run, replacing Honey, I Shrunk the Audience.

In August 2010, Kodak, who had sponsored the pavilion since it opened, ended its sponsorship after nearly 28 years.

In June 2016, the old upstairs portion of the Imagination Pavilion used for the original ImageWorks reopened as a lounge exclusively for Disney Vacation Club members.

At the D23 fan event in August 2026, it was announced that Dreamfinder will return alongside Figment as the fourth renovations of Journey Into Imagination ride in Imagination Pavillion at EPCOT.

=== Current attractions ===
- Journey into Imagination with Figment (June 2, 2002–present; third renovations)
- Magic Eye Theater
  - Disney & Pixar Short Film Festival (December 23, 2015–present)
    - Get a Horse! (2015—present)
    - Piper (2017—present)
    - Feast (2017—present)
    - For the Birds (2015—2017)
    - La Luna (2015—2017)
- Disney Vacation Club ImaginAtrium - A Member Lounge (2016–present)

=== Current exhibitions ===
- ImageWorks: The What-If Labs (October 1, 1999–present; second renovations)

=== Former attractions ===
- Magic Eye Theater
  - Magic Journeys (October 1, 1982 – February 9, 1986)
    - Makin' Memories (Early 1980s)
  - Captain EO (September 12, 1986 – July 6, 1994; first renovations)
    - Captain EO Tribute (July 2, 2010 – December 6, 2015; second renovations)
  - Honey, I Shrunk the Audience (November 21, 1994 – May 9, 2010)
- Journey Into Imagination (March 5, 1983 – October 10, 1998; first renovations)
- Journey Into Your Imagination (October 1, 1999 – October 8, 2001; second renovations)

=== Former exhibitions ===
- ImageWorks (October 1, 1982 – October 10, 1998; first renovations)

== See also ==
- Epcot attraction and entertainment history
