= Tony Baxter =

American amusement ride designer

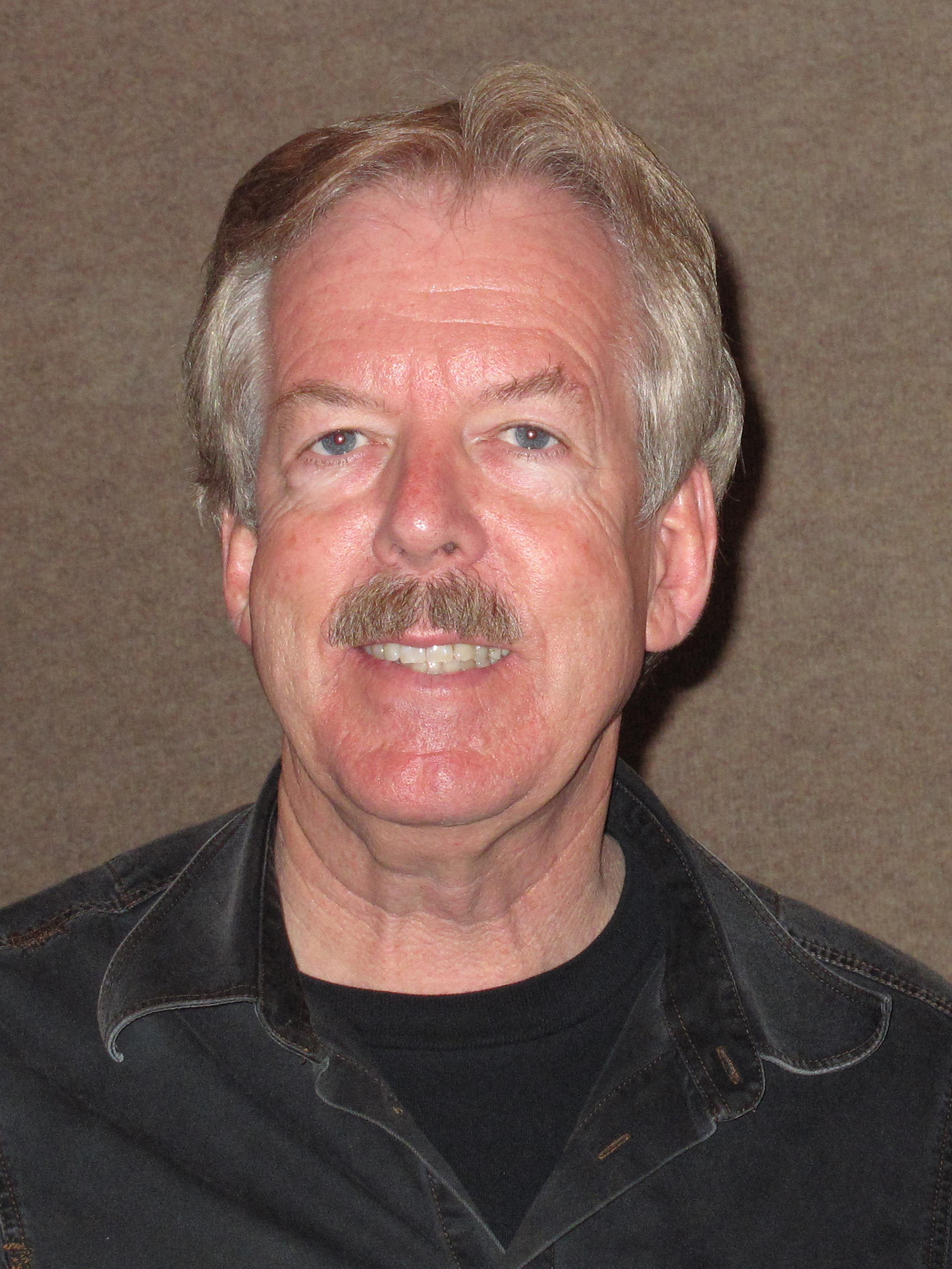
- Baxter in 2009
- Born: February 1, 1947 (age 79); Los Angeles, California, U.S.
- Education: Santa Ana High School, California State University, Long Beach
- Occupations: Senior Vice President, Creative Development, Walt Disney Imagineering, formerly known as WED Enterprises
- Years active: 1965–2016, 2020 (Tiana's Bayou Adventure)
- Board member of: Walt Disney Imagineering
- Awards: THEA Award, Lifetime Achievement; Disney Legend, 2013

Tony Wayne Baxter (born February 1, 1947) is the former senior vice president of creative development in Walt Disney Imagineering and was responsible for creating designs and carrying out the construction of attractions all over the world. He announced his departure from his full-time position to become a part-time adviser on February 1, 2013. During his 47-year tenure with the company, he oversaw the construction of multiple contemporary Disney theme park attractions, including Big Thunder Mountain Railroad, Star Tours, Splash Mountain, The Indiana Jones Adventure, and Journey Into Imagination, and served as the executive producer of Disneyland Paris.

Baxter was first hired at Disneyland Park in 1965 as an ice cream scooper on Main Street, U.S.A. at the age of 17. During his employment at the park, he held many different positions. He later caught the attention of WED Enterprises (now known as Walt Disney Imagineering). During his first 24 years he built up his rank within the company until he was given the position as senior vice president of creative development in Walt Disney Imagineering. His projects include Big Thunder Mountain Railroad at Disneyland, Walt Disney World and Disneyland Paris, and remodeling Fantasyland and Tomorrowland in Disneyland.

== Inspiration ==
Tony Baxter was interested in Disneyland since the day it opened, when he was 8 years old. He first toured Imagineering before being hired at the parks. This was around the same time Great Moments with Mr. Lincoln came to Disneyland Park. Baxter watched the show and was instantly captivated with Disney engineering. He applied for a position at the parks selling popcorn and scooping ice cream, and moved on to attractions to gain Disney experience. At the time, Baxter was going to school at Cal Poly Pomona. For his senior project, he created a design for a Mary Poppins ride which was then shown to WED Enterprises through a connected friend. Impressed by Baxter's work, WED Enterprises invited him to a second tour of the company where they showed him the aspects of the position as well as concepts they were currently working on. Baxter left the tour that day with a new career in mind and as a result, switched his career path and transferred schools.

== School ==
After graduating from Santa Ana High School in 1965, he attended Cal Poly Pomona as a landscape architecture major, but soon after transferred to California State University in Long Beach to study Theater Design. During this time, Baxter created a portfolio which included concepts of attractions for Disneyland as part of his senior project, which he had spent his entire last year of college constructing. Baxter graduated from Cal State Long Beach in 1969.

== WED Enterprises/Walt Disney Imagineering ==
A partial list of the attractions Baxter has been responsible for:

=== Big Thunder Mountain Railroad ===
Big Thunder Mountain Railroad opened at Disneyland in 1979, and was recreated a year later in Magic Kingdom. It was designed by both Tony Baxter and his mentor Claude Coats and was the first ride built in Disneyland without any input from Walt Disney. The land that Big Thunder Mountain Railroad was built upon had previously been Walt Disney's original ride, Nature's Wonderland, which had lost popularity among guests. Tokyo Disneyland and Disneyland Paris got their versions in 1987 and 1992, respectively.

=== Fantasyland remodel ===
The remodeled Fantasyland opened at Disneyland in 1983 with Baxter's oversight. It included the redesign of all the architecture from a Renaissance theme to appear like a Bavarian village. It featured, among many changes, completely rebuilt versions of the Fantasyland dark rides, plus the addition of Pinocchio's Daring Journey. Under Baxter's supervision, the new Fantasyland featured many details and was the most technically advanced land in the park for the era.

=== Splash Mountain ===
Splash Mountain opened at Disneyland in 1989. America Sings, another attraction at Disneyland, was slated to be closed due to poor attendance. Baxter incorporated most of the Audio-Animatronics figures from America Sings with his idea for a log flume attraction that would eventually be named Splash Mountain, based on the animated sequences from Disney's 1946 film Song of the South. Other versions of Splash Mountain opened at Tokyo Disneyland and Magic Kingdom in 1992. In 2020, Disney announced that the Disneyland and Magic Kingdom versions of the attraction would be re-themed based on Disney Animation's 2009 film The Princess and the Frog, and that Baxter would contribute to this new version as a creative advisor. In 2022, it was announced that the new attraction would be called Tiana's Bayou Adventure with an opening set for "late 2024" at both parks. The Magic Kingdom version of Splash Mountain closed in January 2023, while the Disneyland version closed in May 2023. Tiana's Bayou Adventure opened in June 2024 at Magic Kingdom, and in November 2024 at Disneyland.

=== Indiana Jones Adventure ===
Indiana Jones Adventure was revealed on March 4, 1995, and was worked on by over 400 Imagineers. Baxter was one of the main supervisors of the project and led his own team of 100. They were responsible for designing the half-mile-long track that was built over the previous Eeyore parking lot as well as the different concepts for each room in the ride.

=== Finding Nemo Submarine Voyage ===
Finding Nemo Submarine Voyage was opened on June 11, 2007. The track for Finding Nemo Submarine Voyage had previously existed as the new ride simply replaced its predecessor, the Submarine Voyage. Baxter and his team were in charge of collaborating with Pixar to create the story-line and animation for the ride. Difficulty came however when Baxter was faced with the challenge of syncing the sound with the ride. Due to the fact that there were 20 windows on each side of the submarine, all featuring different aspects of the ride at the same time, the sound had to keep in time with what was being portrayed, no matter where a guest would sit within the underwater vessel.

== Selected Disney works ==
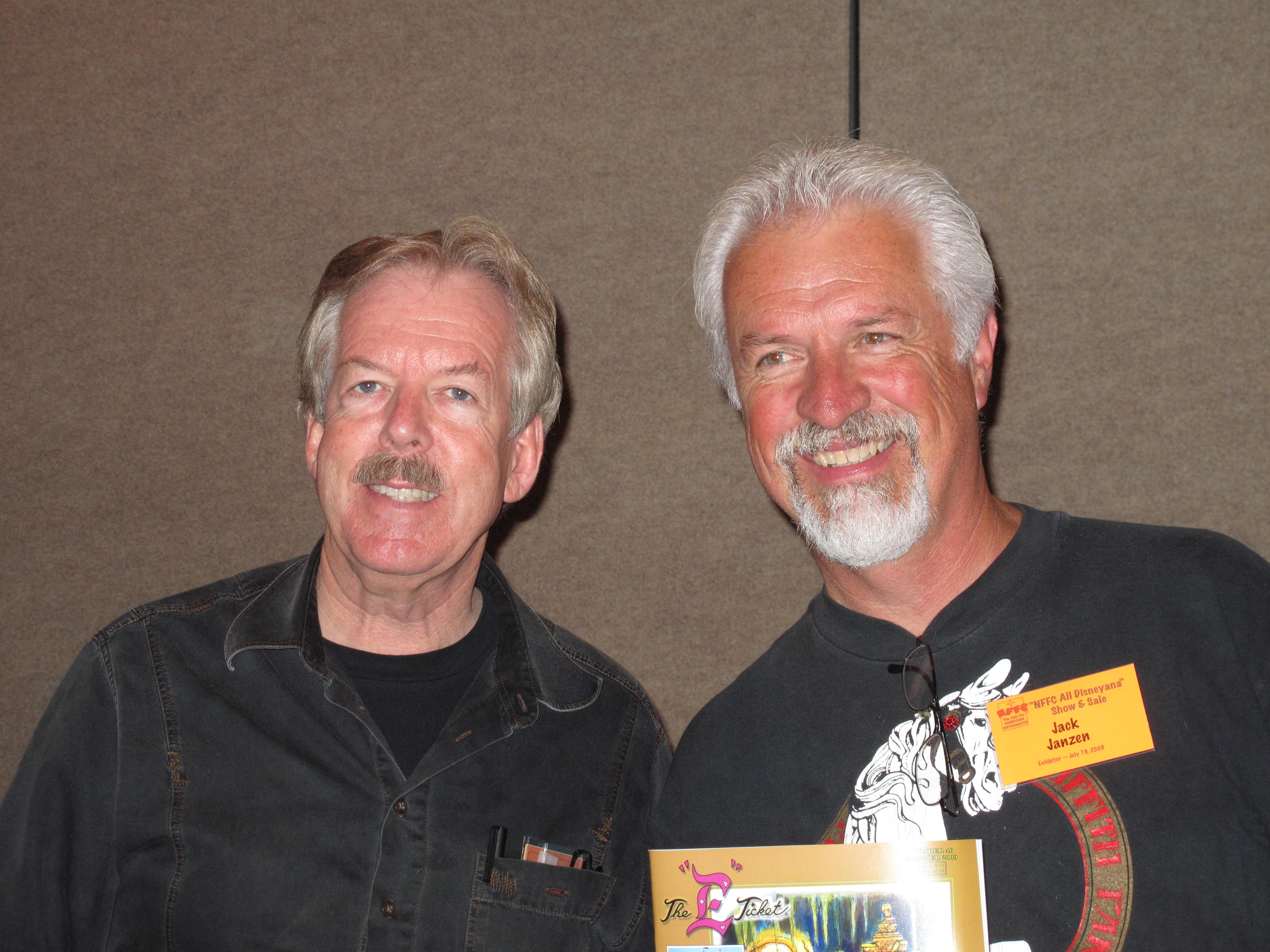
Tony Baxter and Jack Janzen in 2009 at a National Fantasy Fan Club (NFFC) event

List of Tony Baxter projects for WED Enterprises/Walt Disney Imagineering
Attraction	Park	Year opened	Year closed
Big Thunder Mountain Railroad	Disneyland; Magic Kingdom; Tokyo Disneyland; Disneyland Paris	1979; 1980; 1987; 1992	
Journey Into Imagination	EPCOT Center	1983	1998
The Disney Gallery	Disneyland	1987	2007 (original location)
Star Tours	Disneyland; Tokyo Disneyland; Disney-MGM Studios; Disneyland Paris	1987; 1989; 1989; 1992	2010; 2012; 2010; 2016
Splash Mountain	Disneyland; Tokyo Disneyland; Magic Kingdom	1989; 1992; 1992	2023 2023
Indiana Jones Adventure	Disneyland; Tokyo DisneySea	1995; 2001	
Finding Nemo Submarine Voyage	Disneyland	2007	
Sleeping Beauty Castle Walkthrough (updated version)	Disneyland	2008	
Star Tours – The Adventures Continue	Disney's Hollywood Studios; Disneyland; Tokyo Disneyland; Disneyland Paris	2011; 2011; 2013; 2017	

Disneyland themed-land rehabs
Land	Year Re-opened
Fantasyland	1983
Tomorrowland	1998

== Awards and honors ==
Baxter has been awarded the Themed Entertainment Association's THEA award for lifetime achievement. In 2004, Baxter was the recipient of the DFC Disney Legend award from the Disneyana Fan Club. In August 2013, in a ceremony at the D23 Expo in Anaheim, CA, Baxter was inducted as a Disney Legend. A few months later, in November 2013, Baxter received the honor of having his name appear on Main Street, U.S.A. windows at Disneyland. The window, which can be found above the Main Street Magic Shop reads:Main Street Marvels – Tony Baxter, Inventor, Imagination is at the heart of our Creations

== Sources ==
- Tully, Sarah (2013). "Top Disneyland ride creator steps down". Orange County: Orange County Register.
- Andy (2012). "Meet Imagineer Tony Baxter". dlp.info.
- Cedino, Kevin (2007). "Tony Baxter Interview". UltimateDisney.com: DVDizzy.com.
- Levine, Arthur (2008). "Going along for the Ride with Disney Imagineer Tony Baxter". about.com: about.com.
- Niles, Robert (2013). "Thank you, Tony Baxter". themeparkinsider.com: Theme Park Insider.
- insidethemagic.net
