= All in the golden afternoon... =

Poem by Lewis Carroll

"All in the golden afternoon" is the preface poem in Lewis Carroll's 1865 book Alice's Adventures in Wonderland. The introductory poem recalls the afternoon that he improvised the story about Alice in Wonderland while on a boat trip from Oxford to Godstow, for the benefit of the three Liddell sisters: Lorina Charlotte (the flashing "Prima"), Alice Pleasance (the hoping "Secunda"), and Edith Mary (the interrupting "Tertia"). Alice gave her name to Carroll's main character.

Carroll's "All in the golden afternoon" has been included in some film and stage adaptations of Alice's Adventures in Wonderland, including Walt Disney's 1951 animated adaptation where it was used as a song title and a 1972 play version created by director André Gregory, who used portions of the first and last stanzas of the poem to introduce the play's plot. The poem was also changed slightly and its first, second, third, fourth, and fifth stanzas used as lyrics for a song of the same name by the German band Alphaville.

== Full text ==
Illustration in a 1983 edition of Lewis Carroll's Alice's Adventures in Wonderland

All in the golden afternoon
Full leisurely we glide;
For both our oars, with little skill,
By little arms are plied,
While little hands make vain pretence
Our wanderings to guide.

Ah, cruel Three! In such an hour,
Beneath such dreamy weather,
To beg a tale of breath too weak
To stir the tiniest feather!
Yet what can one poor voice avail
Against three tongues together?

Imperious Prima flashes forth
Her edict "to begin it"—
In gentler tones Secunda hopes
"There will be nonsense in it!"—
While Tertia interrupts the tale
Not more than once a minute.

Anon, to sudden silence won,
In fancy they pursue
The dream-child moving through a land
Of wonders wild and new,
In friendly chat with bird or beast—
And half believe it true.

And ever, as the story drained
The wells of fancy dry,
And faintly strove that weary one
To put the subject by,
"The rest next time—" "It is next time!"
The happy voices cry.

Thus grew the tale of Wonderland:
Thus slowly, one by one,
Its quaint events were hammered out—
And now the tale is done,
And home we steer, a merry crew,
Beneath the setting sun.

Alice! A childish story take,
And with a gentle hand,
Lay it where Childhood's dreams are twined
In Memory's mystic band,
Like pilgrim's withered wreath of flowers
Plucked in far-off land.

== Poetic form ==
"All in the golden afternoon" is a poem made up of seven six-line stanzas. Each of the stanzas follows the same general rhyme scheme as well: ABCBDB - every second, fourth, and sixth line rhymes. Additionally, it would do well to note that the 'B' lines are typically in iambic trimeter and thus have fewer syllables than their preceding and succeeding lines. The lines that do not rhyme are mostly in iambic tetrameter; the only exceptions to both of these lie in the second, third and seventh stanzas.

The first stanza also introduces the pun involving the three sisters' last name: Liddell. It thrice mentions the word little and plays off the fact that the pronunciation of both was quite similar.

== Historical influences ==
This poem depicts the story of how, during the summer of 1862 and in the company of the three Liddell sisters and Reverend Robinson Duckworth, Lewis Carroll composed Alice's Adventures in Wonderland. It is from the first-hand accounts of those summer days that the background for this poem becomes clearer.

Alice Pleasance Liddell was age 10 at the time that Charles Lutwidge Dodgson (Lewis Carroll) first described life in Wonderland. Alice and her two sisters spent much of their free time with Carroll and Duckworth. During the summer, the group would often take expeditions up the Isis branch of the Thames river, complete with picnic baskets and lessons in the art of rowing. During one of these excursions the first telling of Alice's adventures takes place. The story would have faded away had not Alice insisted that the tales be written down especially for her.

The first copy of Alice's Adventures in Wonderland (then titled Alice's Adventures Under Ground) was a handwritten volume given personally to Alice Liddell, who inspired the main character in the fantastical tales. When the story was about to be published as a book Carroll added the poem as a preface. He felt that his tale was a bit frightening for sensitive, young children, and he hoped that the poem would soften the fearfulness of the story and present a gateway into Wonderland. In doing so, Carroll dropped the original dedication to Alice Liddell which had read: "A Christmas Gift to a Dear Child in Memory of a Summer Day." Carroll did, however, insert the last stanza of the poem as a special message to her, a nod to their shared experience in the creation of Wonderland.

This poem closely follows what actually happened during those summer outings, according to Alice Liddell. In the fifth stanza, the "weary one" refers to Carroll himself, whom Alice recalls saying, "And that's all till next time" to which she and her sisters would respond with, "Ah but it is next time." These snippets also help corroborate the rest of the history behind the poem. Additionally, Carroll and Alice cite that the day of the excursion described by the poem was "burning" hot; ironically, however, the day that they mention was cloudy, rainy and not particularly "golden."

== Critical interpretations ==
The style of Carroll’s poems, including “All in the Golden Afternoon,” were considered to emulate a more traditional and, as some considered even in his own time, outdated form of poetry. Readers at this time would have been looking for poetry full of wit, irony, and the expression of conflict, but in accordance with the poets that he most admired, such as Tennyson and the Rossettis, Carroll's poetry embodied the principles of beauty and wisdom. This poem in particular contains many of the standard themes of this older, romantic form of poetry—including a dreamy, picturesque landscape and a presupposed listener.

William Madden suggests that Carroll chose this outdated form of poetry for a purpose—the poems were not meant to stand alone, but to be a framework for the main piece of literature, Alice’s Adventures in Wonderland. The poem puts the reader in the right frame of mind to interpret the themes in the novel—it is a compliment to his “work of nonsense.” Without the context of Alice's Adventures in Wonderland, the poem lacks meaning.
