= Journey into Imagination with Figment =

Dark ride attraction at Epcot

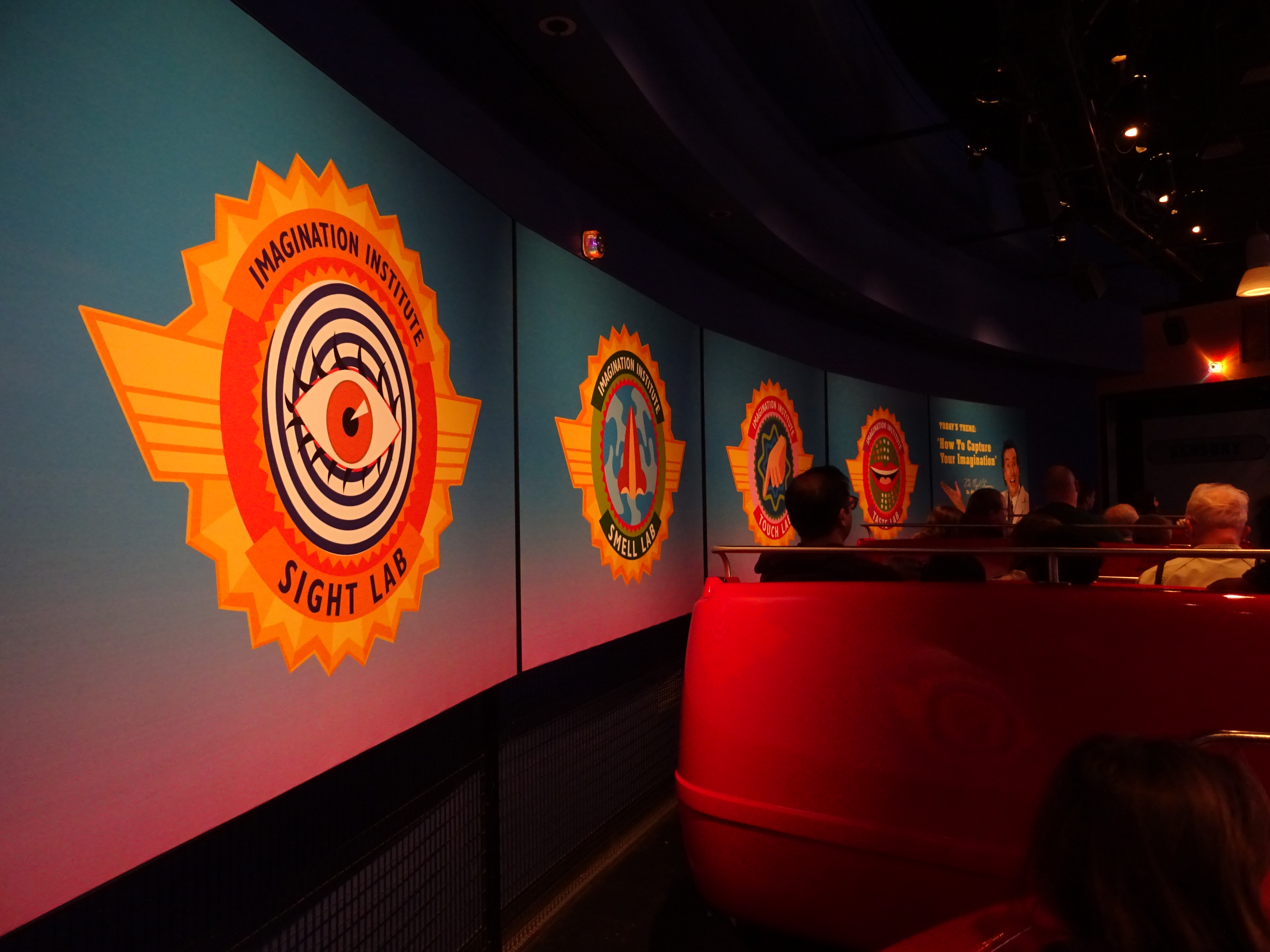
- Attraction's loading area, pictured in 2020.

Epcot
- Area: Future World West (2002–2021); World Celebration (2021–present)
- Status: Operating
- Opening date: June 2, 2002
- Replaced: Journey Into YOUR Imagination (Future World)

Ride statistics
- Attraction type: Dark Ride
- Designer: Walt Disney Imagineering
- Music: "One Little Spark" written by the Sherman Brothers (music & lyrics)
- Vehicle type: Modified omnimovers
- Riders per vehicle: 7
- Rows: 2
- Riders per row: 3 (front row); 4 (back row)
- Duration: 7:30
- Ride hosts: Dr. Nigel Channing (played by Eric Idle); Figment (voiced by Dave Goelz)
- Sponsor: Kodak (2002–2010)
- Lightning Lane Available
- Wheelchair accessible
- Closed captioning available

Journey into Imagination with Figment is the third and latest incarnation of a dark ride attraction located within the Imagination! pavilion at World Celebration at Epcot, a theme park at the Walt Disney World in Bay Lake, Florida. Originally opened on March 5, 1983, its original and current version feature the small purple dragon named Figment as well as a slightly altered version of the song "One Little Spark", composed by the Sherman Brothers.

== History ==
=== 1983–1998: Journey into Imagination ===
Journey into Imagination

Epcot
- Area: Future World West
- Status: Removed
- Opening date: March 5, 1983
- Closing date: October 10, 1998
- Replaced by: Journey Into YOUR Imagination

Ride statistics
- Attraction type: Dark Ride
- Designer: WED Enterprises
- Music: "One Little Spark" written by the Sherman Brothers (music & lyrics)
- Vehicle type: Modified omnimovers
- Riders per vehicle: 7
- Rows: 2
- Riders per row: 3 (front row); 4 (back row)
- Duration: 11:00
- Ride host: The Dreamfinder (voiced by Chuck McCann and Ron Schneider) (Note: McCann voiced The Dreamfinder in the first half of the attraction. Schneider was cast as the voice of The Dreamfinder for the second half of the attraction after Disney parted ways with McCann due to working differences. Additionally, Schneider originated the role of The Dreamfinder as a physical meet-and-greet character at Epcot.); Figment (voiced by Billy Barty)
- Sponsor: Kodak
- Wheelchair accessible

The original version of the attraction opened on March 5, 1983, and was the creation of Tony Baxter and Steve Kirk. It began with the omnimover vehicles "floating" in the clouds and seeing the silhouette of a strange blimp mixed with a vacuum cleaner and hearing the humming and singing of its pilot. In the next scene, the riders come right next to this vessel and the pilot, a red-bearded man, dressed in a blue suit and top hat, introduces himself as the Dreamfinder (voiced by Chuck McCann and Ron Schneider) and saying that he uses his vehicle (called the Dream Mobile or Dream Catcher by some fans) to collect dreams and ideas to create all sorts of new things. Soon, he creates a figment of his imagination: "two tiny wings, eyes big and yellow, horns of a steer, but a lovable fellow! From head to tail, he's royal purple pigment, and there, voilà! You've got a Figment!" Both Dreamfinder and the dragon Figment (voiced by Billy Barty) imagine things to fill the "idea bag". When the idea bag is full, Dreamfinder declares that the ideas need to be emptied in the "Dreamport" which, as he says, is "never far away when you use your imagination".

Regarding the scene where Figment is introduced, Baxter said:

If you're telling the story of Little Mermaid or Snow White, everyone already knows who they are, what they talk like, how they sing, etc. But in a ride like Imagination, you're not familiar with the characters going into it. This opening scene allows you to meet Dreamfinder, understand how he created Figment, and get to know Figment's personality, so at the end of those four minutes you know the characters.

The omnimovers leave the side of the Dream Mobile and enter the Dreamport's storage room, which includes a massive contraption for sorting ideas. Also in the room there are numerous objects including boxed applause, a plasma ball, and a birdcage of musical notes. After leaving the storage room, the ride continued through several rooms representing Art, Literature, the Performing Arts and Science. The Art room was mostly white colored, and had a large painting Dreamfinder was making using a large fiber optic paint brush, a carousel with giant carousel animals and a pot of rainbows held by Figment.

The Literature room was mostly focused on suspenseful tales and had Dreamfinder playing a massive organ with words coming out of it, words that turned into their meanings, a massive book featuring the raven from Edgar Allan Poe's poem cawing menacingly and books of horrible monsters Figment tried to keep closed. The Performing Arts had Figment trying on costumes backstage while Dreamfinder conducted a laser light show in the manner of an orchestra conductor. The last of the rooms, Science, featured a large machine that Dreamfinder was operating that took a closer look at the workings of nature such as the growth of plants, the formation of crystals from minerals and looking into space.

At the end, Dreamfinder told Figment and the audience that Imagination is the key to unlocking the hidden wonders of the world. The ride then entered the final show scene. As the riders' pictures were taken, they saw Figment surrounded by several movie screens of him being a scientist, a mountain climber, a pirate, a superhero, a tap dancer, a ship captain, a cowboy and an athlete. Dreamfinder, who is behind a movie camera, gave the riders one last inspiring message and told them to use their newly found sparks of imagination in the ImageWorks and the on-ride photo was shown on a screen next to the camera.

The ride then exited into ImageWorks, which was meant to be a creative playground of the future. ImageWorks was an interactive playground located above the ride where guests could play with their imaginations. Those activities included interactive exhibits such as giant kaleidoscopes, pin-screens, a rainbow corridor, and a drama stage which gave guests the opportunity to put themselves in their own movie. The ImageWorks section of the Imagination pavilion opened five months before Journey Into Imagination, and it was a hit among guests. The ride closed on October 10, 1998, in order to begin a major renovation of the attraction.

=== 1999–2001: Journey into YOUR Imagination ===
Journey into Your Imagination
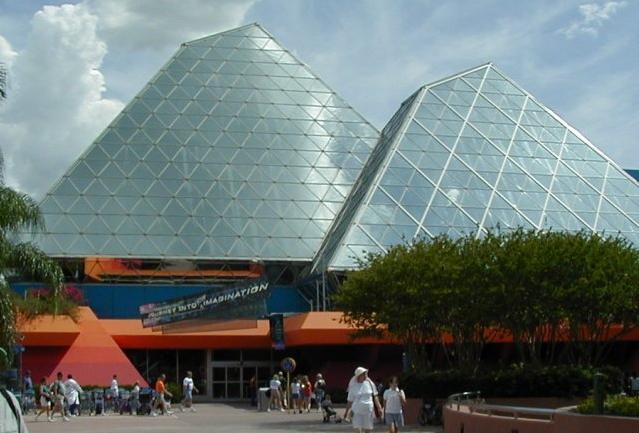

Epcot
- Area: Future World
- Status: Removed
- Opening date: October 1, 1999
- Closing date: October 8, 2001
- Replaced: Journey Into Imagination
- Replaced by: Journey Into Imagination with Figment (World Celebration)

Ride statistics
- Attraction type: Dark Ride
- Designer: Walt Disney Imagineering
- Vehicle type: Modified omnimovers
- Riders per vehicle: 7
- Rows: 2
- Riders per row: 3 (front row); 4 (back row)
- Duration: 5:00
- Rode host: Dr. Nigel Channing (played by Eric Idle)
- Sponsor: Kodak
- Wheelchair accessible

The second version of the attraction reopened on October 1, 1999, as Journey Into YOUR Imagination, featuring an updated theme based on the 3D attraction Honey, I Shrunk the Audience, which had opened five years earlier. Guests were given a tour of the Imagination Institute and made test subjects for a new invention, the Imagination Scanner. Dr. Nigel Channing (played by Eric Idle reprising his role from Honey, I Shrunk The Audience) hosted this version. Also present were Philip Brainard from Flubber and Dean Higgins (from Dexter Riley films)

The ride began with guests going through the scanner and being told that they had no imagination. Then Channing sends riders through the Institute's labs including Sound, Illusion, Color, Connections, and Gravity. In the first room, Sound, the room starts out in total silence and complete darkness. Slowly, one can hear the sounds of cricket chirping, distant city noises, and an approaching train that comes closer and closer until it seems to pass over the audience's heads. In the second room, Illusion, there is a fish swimming in and out of its tank and an empty cage with a butterfly that seems to materialize as riders go by. In the third room, the Color lab, there are sounds of jungle animals and cities that cause two large light screens to change colors matching the sounds. In the next room, Connections, the room is covered with numerous stars that soon form into constellations. Finally, in the Gravity lab, the riders enter an upside down house. For the finale, riders go through the Scanner again and find that their minds have been supercharged with ideas. The machine then "explodes" and the audience see a light show.

Reception to Journey into YOUR Imagination was largely negative from guests and critics. Figment's appearances in the experience were reduced to cameos in the queue movies, a constellation in the connection lab and at the end of the ride, where he is heard but is shooed off by Channing. Fans were mainly upset that the Dreamfinder, a popular character from the original ride, was not present in this version. Additionally, the ride path was drastically shortened due to budgetary issues. Because of this, the attraction closed on October 8, 2001, and went through another renovation.

=== 2002–present: Journey into Imagination with Figment ===
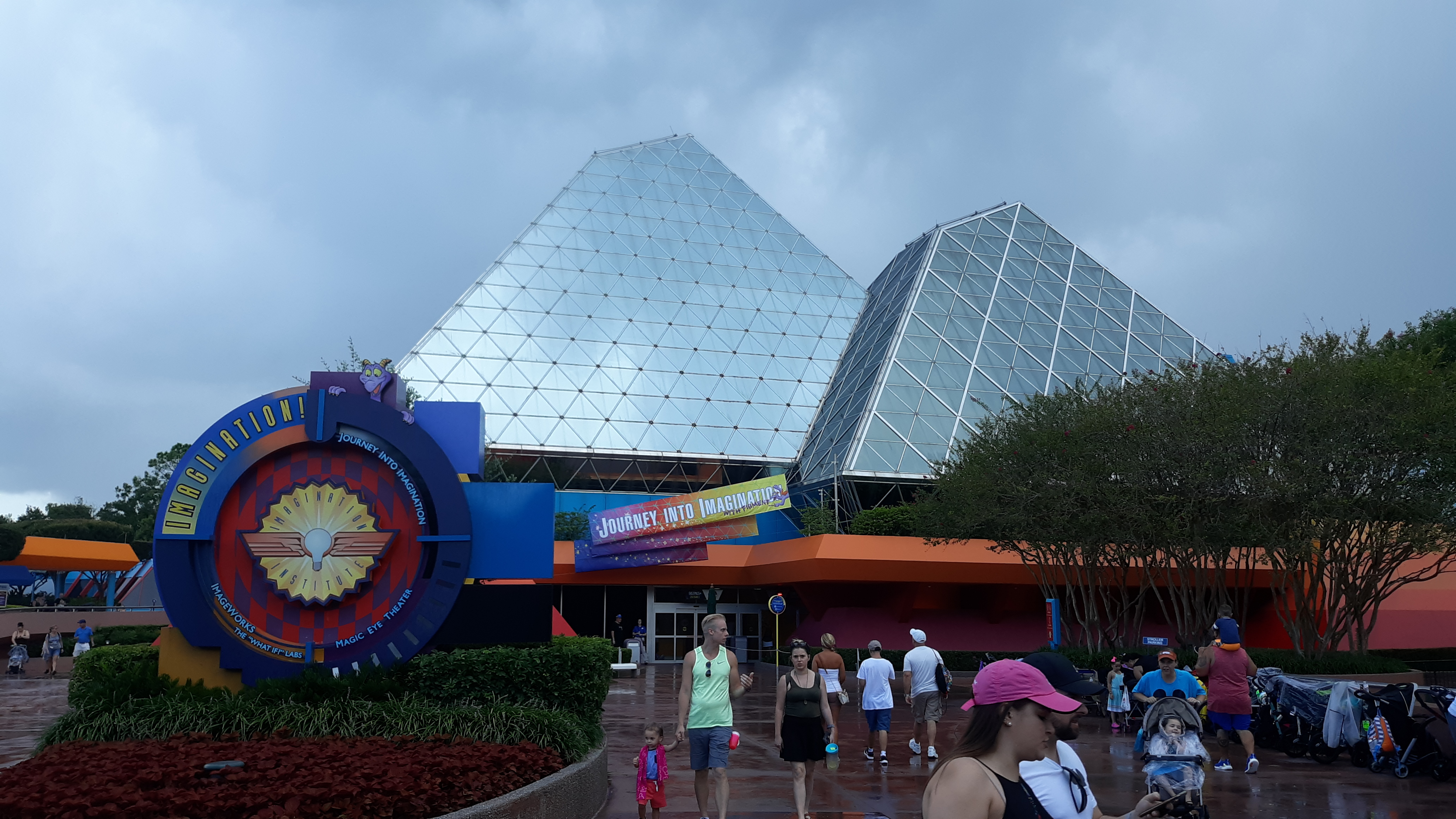
The Journey into Imagination with Figment ride at Epcot.

The overwhelmingly negative response to Journey into YOUR Imagination led to the ride being shut down and renovated once again after only 2 years. The attraction opened for its third and current iteration on June 2, 2002, as Journey into Imagination with Figment. Figment returned with a larger role, appearing in every show scene; the classic song "One Little Spark" also returned with new verses, but the Dreamfinder was still absent.

This time, the Institute has five labs based on the five human senses: Sound, Sight, Smell, Touch, and Taste. Dr. Nigel Channing of the Imagination Institute (Eric Idle, from the previous incarnation) invites guests to the Institute's open house. Figment (voiced by Dave Goelz) tags along, much to Channing's dismay, and causes mischief along the way.

- In Sound, Figment interrupts the experiment and comes up with a telephone and the train sound from the previous version is now a "train of thought".
- In Sight, Figment knocks the letters off the room's eye chart and begins a sing-along to "One Little Spark". The materializing butterfly from the previous version was carried over, but rather than appearing in the cage, the effect is now reversed so that the butterfly is hiding.
- In Smell, Figment becomes a skunk, which blasts the riders with a foul odor (which is actually a burnt coffee smell).

After seeing the chaos Figment has been causing, Channing stops the tour outside the Touch and Taste labs, abandoning the tour. Figment takes the riders to his own open house, which he literally turns upside down with his carefree mind. Channing soon learns from Figment that Imagination should be set free ("If you can't beat 'em, join 'em!") and the riders go into the finale with numerous Figments in various situations while Figment and Channing (Channing is seen as the moon) sing "One Little Spark" together while riders disembark for the ImageWorks.

A homage to the initial incarnation of this attraction can be found on an office door in the initial showroom under the name "Dean Finder", alluding to "Dreamfinder".

Both the 1999 and 2002 versions were created by Tom Fitzgerald.

The Kodak company ended its sponsorship of the pavilion in August 2010, after nearly 28 years.

Starting in 2020, the Figment animatronics would be given a cyan Christmas sweater every holiday season.

=== Future ===
At the D23 fan event in August 2026, it was announced that Dreamfinder will return alongside Figment as part of a reimagining of Journey Into Imagination.

== ImageWorks: The "What If?" Labs ==
ImageWorks: The "What If?" Labs
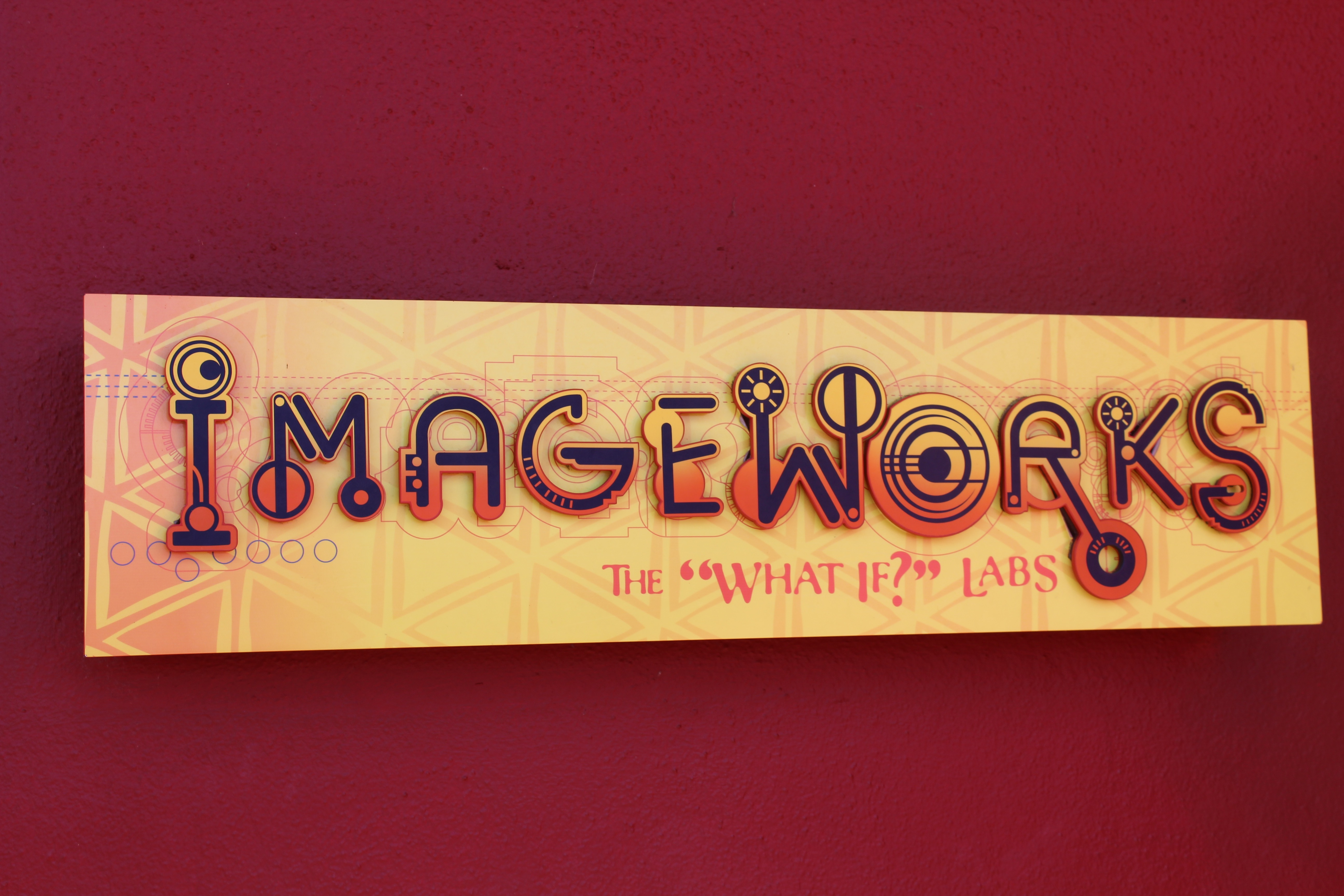

Epcot
- Area: Future World: 1982–2021; World Celebration: 2021–present (Imagination! Pavilion)
- Coordinates: 28°22′22.29″N 81°33′5.06″W
- Status: Operating
- Opening date: October 1, 1982 (ImageWorks); October 1, 1999 (The What-If Labs)
- Closing date: October 10, 1998 (ImageWorks)
- Replaced by: Disney Vacation Club ImaginAtrium - A Member lounge (ImageWorks)

Ride statistics
- Attraction type: Interactive exhibit
- Designer: WED Enterprises
- Music: "One Little Spark" written by the Sherman Brothers (music & lyrics)
- Attraction host: Figment
- Sponsor: Kodak (1982–2010)
- Wheelchair accessible

ImageWorks: The "What If?" Labs is an interactive exhibit area located at the Imagination! pavilion on the western side of World Celebration at Epcot, a theme park at the Walt Disney World Resort in Bay Lake, Florida. The original Journey Into Imagination described ImageWorks as "the creative playground of the future". Before its 1998 closure, the attraction was originally named ImageWorks and was located in the upstairs area of the Imagination! pavilion. The What-If Labs saw the addition of new interactive musical and digital exhibits.

In 1999, the attraction reopened at the exit of Journey into Imagination with Figment. Kodak originally sponsored The What-If Labs, before ending its sponsorship in 2010. As of early 2012, sponsorship of the area was assumed by ColorVision, a company that operates green-screen photo kiosks in many major theme parks. In June 2016 the ImageWorks staircase area of the Imagination Pavilion reopened as a lounge for Disney Vacation Club members. The original ImageWorks is still believed to be intact as it has been walled off.

=== Exhibits ===
==== ImageWorks (1982–1998) ====
The original Imageworks was located on the second floor of the pavilion. It was closed and partially dismantled during the 1998 renovation of the pavilion. Some of the original equipment remains in place, but guests are no longer able to enter the second floor.

- Dreamfinder's School of Drama — using a bluescreen, guests put themselves into a movie under the direction of Dreamfinder. Choices were a Western (Daring Deputies and the Return of Sagebrush Sam), a fantasy film (Enchanted Travelers -- The Wily Wizard and the Cranky King), or a science fiction film (Acrobatic Astronauts in Galactic Getaway).
- Pin Screens — a massive pin table.
- Stepping Tones — guests create music from stepping on color panels.
- Figment's Coloring Book — guests colored images featuring Figment and Dreamfinder using electric "paintbrush guns".
- Rainbow Corridor — a large tunnel that featured colored lights that followed the guests as they went through, with each guest getting a different color. This has gained high notoriety among Disney fans as Michael Jackson had several photos taken here in the 1980s.
- Electronic Philharmonic — by the usage of sensors, guests could conduct an orchestra. Pepper's ghost holograms of musical notes would appear out of a collection of instruments behind a pane of glass, along with audible music, when guests waved their hands over images of each section of the orchestra.
- Kaleidoscopes — very large kaleidoscopes that could be controlled by the guest.
- Vibrating Mirrors — an effect that made guests' reflections warp like a funhouse mirror.
- Voice Activated Lumia — a 6-foot-diameter (1.8 m) sphere that would respond with light effects to the guests voice or sounds.
- Bubble Projectors — in the small pyramid, bubbles were projected on circular screens under the guests control. When they overlapped they would create new colors

==== ImageWorks – The "What If?" Labs (1999–present) ====
This Imageworks incarnation is located on the first floor of the pavilion, outside of the ride exit. The area is directly adjacent to the pavilion's gift shop. It was known as the Kodak "What If?" Labs from 1999 to 2010 while Kodak was a sponsor for the exhibit. The Kodak name has since been dropped.

- Stepping Tones — much like the original, though now featuring picture panels making sounds.
- Figment's Melody Maker — added in the 2002 refurbishment, guests can cause Figment to play an instrument to the tune of One Little Spark, changing pitch by what height Figment is at on the screen.
- Create A Figment — also added in 2002, there are small touchscreens where guests can make their own Figment and email it to a friend or family member.
- Simon — replaced photograph area due to Kodak's lack of sponsorship.
- Character Meet And Greets — introduced in 2022, guests met Joy from Pixar's Inside Out (before being permanently moved to Disney's Hollywood Studios for the Inside Out 2 marketing campaign) and Figment. Figment then replaced Vanellope Von Schweetz from the Wreck It Ralph series in 2023.

== One Little Spark ==
One Little Spark
Clip of the song as heard on the original attraction

"One Little Spark" is a song written by the Sherman Brothers for the original Journey Into Imagination attraction.

The original version of the song (1983–1998) was performed by audio-animatronic characters, Dreamfinder (voiced by Chuck McCann) and his creation Figment (voiced by Billy Barty). The 2002 version is performed by Dr. Nigel Channing (Eric Idle) with Figment (voiced by Dave Goelz).

A version of this song was performed by Electric Bloom in 2025.

== References to Disney films ==
The 2002 revamp of the Journey into Imagination attraction includes several visual elements suggesting that the "Imagination Institute" is connected to Medfield College, the setting of several live-action Disney films. The queue for the attraction passes the "offices" of Professor Brainard (Fred MacMurray's role in The Absent-Minded Professor (1961), although the queue addressed the 1997 live-action remake when the role was played by Robin Williams), Wayne Szalinski (played by Rick Moranis in the Honey, I Shrunk the Kids trilogy) and Dean Higgins (Joe Flynn's role in the Dexter Riley films). The ride includes further references to The Computer Wore Tennis Shoes, with a glass-fronted computer room, including a sign on the door indicating "no tennis shoes allowed", as well as a Medfield College letter-man's jacket can also be seen inside the room.

== References in other Disney media ==
A portrait of Figment appears in Inside Out as a framed painting in imagination land. Figment also appears on a banner for a carnival game in Toy Story 4.

Figment's sweater can be found in the Chibiverse episode "Journey to the Center of the Chibiverse" as part of the items buried in the ground.

== See also ==
- Epcot attraction and entertainment history
  - Future World
