= Walt Disney Records: The Legacy Collection =

Compilation album series

Walt Disney Records The Legacy Collection logo

Walt Disney Records: The Legacy Collection is a compilation album series produced and released by Walt Disney Records.

== Background ==
The majority of the series commemorates distinct anniversaries of Disney films and the 60th anniversary of Disneyland, containing newly remastered versions of the original and expanded soundtrack albums. Each individual title features original artwork and illustrations by Walt Disney Animation Studios visual development artist, Lorelay Bové. A majority of the releases feature "The Lost Chords"; newly recorded tracks done in-house by Disney staff musicians of originally discarded songs and produced to sound period-appropriate to their album counterparts. The first entry in the series, dedicated to The Lion King, was released on June 24, 2014. The sixteenth and most recent volume in the series, dedicated to Aladdin, was released on September 9, 2022. A box set containing the first twelve volumes was released on November 15, 2015.

== The Lion King ==
The Legacy Collection: The Lion King

Box set by Various artists
- Released: June 24, 2014
- Recorded: Fall 1993–May 1994
- Studios: Media Ventures, Los Angeles; Ocean Way Studios, Los Angeles; Snake Ranch, London; Angel Recording Studios, London; BOP studios, Mmabatho
- Genres: Soundtrack; pop; world
- Length: 2:01:05
- Label: Walt Disney
- Producers: Hans Zimmer; Mark Mancina; Jay Rifkin; Chris Thomas

The Legacy Collection: The Lion King was released on June 24, 2014, in conjunction with the 20th anniversary of The Lion King. The two-disc album includes the film's original soundtrack and approximately thirty minutes of previously unreleased music mixed by Alan Meyerson, as well as liner notes from Hans Zimmer and producer Don Hahn.

All lyrics are written by Tim Rice.

Disc 1
No.	Title	Music	Performer(s)	Length
1.	"Circle of Life"	Elton John	Carmen Twillie, Lebo M	3:59
2.	"Didn't Your Mother Tell You Not to Play with Your Food (Meet Scar)"	Hans Zimmer		2:08
3.	"We Are All Connected"	Hans Zimmer		3:02
4.	"Hyenas in the Pride Lands/The Water Hole"	Hans Zimmer		3:51
5.	"I Just Can't Wait to Be King"	Elton John	Jason Weaver with Rowan Atkinson and Laura Williams	2:52
6.	"Elephant Graveyard (The Hyenas)"	Hans Zimmer		4:48
7.	"I Was Just Trying to Be Brave (The Great Kings)"	Hans Zimmer		2:16
8.	"Be Prepared"	Elton John	Jeremy Irons with Whoopi Goldberg, Cheech Marin and Jim Cummings	3:40
9.	"(Simba, It's) To Die For"	Hans Zimmer		0:48
10.	"Stampede (Long Live the King)"	Hans Zimmer		3:22
11.	"Mufasa Dies (Run Away and Never Return)"	Hans Zimmer		3:27
12.	"If You Ever Come Back We'll Kill You (Scar Takes the Throne)"	Hans Zimmer		1:38
13.	"Bowling for Buzzards (Meet Timon and Pumbaa)"	Hans Zimmer		0:30
14.	"Hakuna Matata"	Elton John	Nathan Lane and Ernie Sabella with Jason Weaver and Joseph Williams	4:08
15.	"We Gotta Bone to Pick with You (Scar's Femine)"	Hans Zimmer		1:08
16.	"Kings of the Past (It is Time)"	Hans Zimmer		2:48
17.	"Nala, Is It Really You? (Simba and Nala Reunite)"	Hans Zimmer		4:11
18.	"Can You Feel the Love Tonight (The Lion King)"	Elton John	Joseph Williams and Sally Dworsky with Nathan Lane, Ernie Sabella and Kristle Edwards	2:52
19.	"Remember Who You Are (Simba Returns)"	Hans Zimmer		7:48
20.	"This Is My Home (Hawaiian War Chant)"	Hans Zimmer (Note: featuring uncredited vocals by Nathan Lane and Ernie Sabella)		2:45
21.	"The Rightful King (Simba Confronts Scar)"	Hans Zimmer		11:46
Total length:				1:13:36

All lyrics are written by Tim Rice.

Disc 2
No.	Title	Music	Performer(s)	Length
1.	"The Morning Report"	Elton John	James Earl Jones, Jeff Bennett and Evan Saucedo	1:37
2.	"Warthog Rhapsody"	Elton John	Nathan Lane, Ernie Sabella and Jason Weaver	3:06
3.	"We Are All Connected" (Score Demo)	Hans Zimmer		3:05
4.	"I Was Just Trying to Be Brave" (Score Demo)	Hans Zimmer		2:16
5.	"Stampede" (Score Demo)	Hans Zimmer		3:23
6.	"Mufasa Dies" (Score Demo)	Hans Zimmer		3:27
7.	"This Is My Home" (Score Demo)	Hans Zimmer		2:28
8.	"The Rightful King" (Score Demo)	Hans Zimmer		11:42
9.	"Circle of Life" (Instrumental Demo)	Hans Zimmer		4:02
10.	"Circle of Life"	Elton John	Elton John	4:52
11.	"I Just Can't Wait to Be King"	Elton John	Elton John	3:37
12.	"Can You Feel The Love Tonight" (End Title)	Elton John	Elton John	4:03
Total length:				47:29

Footnotes

== Mary Poppins ==
The Legacy Collection: Mary Poppins

Box set by Various artists
- Released: August 26, 2014
- Recorded: 1961, 1963, 1964, 1989, 2014
- Studios: Walt Disney Studios, Burbank
- Genres: Soundtrack, film score
- Length: 3:22:42
- Label: Walt Disney
- Producers: Richard M. Sherman; Robert B. Sherman

The Legacy Collection: Mary Poppins was released as a three-disc album on August 26, 2014, to coincide with the 50th anniversary of Mary Poppins. The first disc contains the film's complete original soundtrack, whereas the second disc contains fifteen demo recordings by the Sherman Brothers and seven "Lost Chords" recordings. The third disc consists entirely of archival recordings of story meetings held at the Walt Disney Studios between P.L. Travers, Richard M. Sherman, Robert B. Sherman, and Don DaGradi, as well as press interviews with Julie Andrews, Dick Van Dyke, Irwin Kostal, and the Shermans.

All tracks are written by Richard M. Sherman and Robert B. Sherman, with music adapted and conducted by Irwin Kostal.

Disc 1
No.	Title	Performer(s)	Length
1.	"Buena Vista Fanfare"		0:08
2.	"Overture"		2:58
3.	"One Man Band"		0:56
4.	"Sister Suffragette"	Glynis Johns, Hermione Baddeley and Reta Shaw	1:43
5.	"The Life I Lead"	David Tomlinson	2:00
6.	"The Perfect Nanny"	Karen Dotrice and Matthew Garber	1:37
7.	"Air Mail / Admiral Boom / The Not-So-Perfect Nannies / Mary Poppins Arrives"		3:07
8.	"A Spoonful of Sugar"	Julie Andrews	4:06
9.	"Pavement Artist"	Dick Van Dyke	1:53
10.	"Jolly Holiday"	Andrews, Van Dyke, Bill Lee, Ginny Tyler, Paul Frees, Marc Breaux, Marni Nixon and Thurl Ravenscroft	5:35
11.	"Jolly Holiday (Reprise)"	Andrews, Van Dyke, Daws Butler, Peter Ellenshaw, Dal McKennon, J. Pat O'Malley, Richard Sherman and Tomlinson	1:11
12.	"Penguin Dance"	Irwin Kostal, Richard Sherman	2:20
13.	"The Carousel Horses"		4:17
14.	"Supercalifragilisticexpialidocious"	Andrews, Van Dyke, Richard Sherman and O'Malley	2:02
15.	"Pavement Artist (Reprise)"	Van Dyke	1:01
16.	"Stay Awake"	Andrews	1:42
17.	"Trouble at Uncle Albert's"		1:40
18.	"I Love to Laugh"	Ed Wynn, Andrews and Van Dyke	2:42
19.	"A British Bank (The Life I Lead)"	Tomlinson and Andrews	2:07
20.	"Feed the Birds (Tuppence a Bag)"	Andrews	3:49
21.	"Father's Footsteps"		1:17
22.	"Fidelity Fiduciary Bank"	David Tomlinson, Dick Van Dyke, Arthur Malet, Bill Lee, Thurl Ravenscroft, Allan Davies and William R. Cole	3:30
23.	"Panic at the Bank"		3:21
24.	"Chim Chim Cher-ee / March Over the Rooftops"	Van Dyke, Andrews, Dotrice and Garber	5:11
25.	"Step in Time"	Van Dyke, The Chimney Sweep Chorus and Cast	8:42
26.	"A Man Has Dreams (The Life I Lead/A Spoonful of Sugar)"	Tomlinson and Van Dyke	4:27
27.	"Mr. Banks Is Discharged"		4:45
28.	"Let's Go Fly a Kite"	Tomlinson, Van Dyke and the Londoners	1:49
Total length:			1:19:37

All tracks are written by Richard M. Sherman and Robert B. Sherman.

Disc 2
No.	Title	Performer(s)	Length
1.	"The Perfect Nanny (Demo)"	Richard M. Sherman and Robert B. Sherman	1:11
2.	"Jolly Holiday (Demo)"	Richard M. Sherman and Robert B. Sherman	2:06
3.	"The Pearly Song (Supercalifragilisticexpialidocious) (Demo)"	Richard M. Sherman and Robert B. Sherman	1:30
4.	"Stay Awake (Demo)"	Richard M. Sherman	1:33
5.	"Chim Chim Cher-ee (Demo)"	Richard M. Sherman and Robert B. Sherman	2:40
6.	"I Love to Laugh (Demo)"	Richard M. Sherman and Robert B. Sherman	2:06
7.	"Tuppence a Bag [Feed the Birds (Tuppence a Bag)] (Demo)"	Richard M. Sherman	2:55
8.	"Let's Go Fly a Kite (Demo)"	Richard M. Sherman and Robert B. Sherman	1:45
9.	"Mary Poppins Melody (Pre-Demo)"	Richard M. Sherman and Robert B. Sherman	1:07
10.	"Mary Poppins Melody (New Recording)"	Kate Higgins	2:06
11.	"Admiral Boom (Demo)"	Richard M. Sherman	1:16
12.	"Admiral Boom (New Recording)"	Randy Crenshaw, Jeff Gunn and Dennis Kyle	1:56
13.	"The Right Side (Pre-Demo)"	Richard M. Sherman and Robert B. Sherman	2:27
14.	"The Right Side (New Recording)"	Juliana Hansen	2:36
15.	"The Chimpanzoo (Demo)"	Richard M. Sherman	1:06
16.	"The Chimpanzoo (New Recording)"	Bob Joyce, Jeff Gunn, Randy Crenshaw and Dennis Kyle	1:59
17.	"The Land of Sand (Pre-Demo)"	Richard M. Sherman and Robert B. Sherman	1:35
18.	"The Land of Sand (New Recording)"	Kate Higgins, Juliana Hansen, Jeff Gunn and Bob Joyce	2:32
19.	"The North Pole Polka (Pre-Demo)"	Richard M. Sherman	1:43
20.	"The North Pole Polka (New Recording)"	Jeff Gunn, Bob Joyce, Richard M. Sherman, Kate Higgins and Dennis Kyle	2:12
21.	"The Eyes of Love (Pre-Demo)"	Richard M. Sherman	2:46
22.	"The Eyes of Love (New Recording)"	Juliana Hansen	3:32
23.	"Overture (Album Version)"		4:07
Total length:			48:36

Disc 3
No.	Title	Writer(s)	Length
1.	"Cherry Tree Lane"	Dialogue	0:22
2.	"Mr. Banks Decided to Hire a Nanny Himself"	Dialogue	0:29
3.	"The Children Write Their Own Advertisement"	Dialogue	1:02
4.	"The Line of Applicants and Mary Poppins Arrives"	Dialogue	1:45
5.	"Notes on Mary Meeting the Banks"	Dialogue	0:39
6.	"Up to the Nursery"	Dialogue	2:44
7.	"Bert and the Talking Pictures"	Dialogue	3:45
8.	"A Carousel Horse Ride to the Seashore"	Dialogue	1:18
9.	"The Return Home"	Dialogue	1:51
10.	"The Next Morning We Meet the Sweep"	Dialogue	2:08
11.	"Uncle Albert's"	Dialogue	1:26
12.	"A Change in the Wind and An Adventure With Admiral Boom"	Dialogue	2:19
13.	"The Bird Woman"	Dialogue	2:01
14.	"Mr. Banks and the Compass"	Dialogue	2:58
15.	"The Compass Sequence: Timbuktu"	Dialogue	3:32
16.	"The Compass Sequence: The Land Of Sand"	Dialogue	2:05
17.	"The Compass Sequence: Tea in China"	Dialogue	1:29
18.	"The Compass Sequence: The North Pole"	Dialogue	2:01
19.	"The Return Home"	Dialogue	2:05
20.	"Everyone Descends on Cherry Tree Lane"	Dialogue	2:03
21.	"Mary Departs"	Dialogue	2:03
22.	"Hollywood Spotlight Microphone"	Dialogue	17:27
23.	"The Sherman Brothers Reminisce About Their Work on Mary Poppins"	Dialogue	16:07
Total length:			1:14:29

== Sleeping Beauty ==
The Legacy Collection: Sleeping Beauty

Box set by Various artists
- Released: October 7, 2014
- Recorded: September–November 1958, 2014
- Studios: The Walt Disney Studios, Burbank
- Genres: Soundtrack, film score
- Length: 1:32:53
- Label: Walt Disney
- Producer: George Bruns

The Legacy Collection: Sleeping Beauty was released as a two-disc album on October 7, 2014, to coincide with the 55th anniversary of Sleeping Beauty. The first disc contains the film's complete original soundtrack and the second disc contains three demo recordings, three "Lost Chords" recordings, and four bonus tracks.

Disc 1
No.	Title	Writer(s)	Performer(s)	Length
1.	"Main Title / Once Upon a Dream / Prologue"	Jack Lawrence & Sammy Fain	Disney Studio Chorus	2:57
2.	"Hail to Princess Aurora"	George Bruns & Tom Adair	Disney Studio Chorus	1:57
3.	"The Gifts of Beauty and Song / Maleficent Appears / True Love Conquers"	George Bruns & Tom Adair	Disney Studio Chorus	5:38
4.	"The Burning of the Spinning Wheels / The Fairies Plan"	George Bruns	George Bruns	4:32
5.	"Maleficent's Frustration"	George Bruns	George Bruns	2:08
6.	"A Cottage in the Woods"	George Bruns	George Bruns	3:27
7.	"Do You Hear That? / I Wonder"	George Bruns, Ted Sears & Winston Hibler	Mary Costa	3:57
8.	"An Unusual Prince / Once Upon a Dream"	Jack Lawrence & Sammy Fain	Mary Costa and Bill Shirley	3:29
9.	"Magical House Cleaning / Blue or Pink"	George Bruns	George Bruns	2:47
10.	"A Secret Revealed"	George Bruns	George Bruns	1:57
11.	"Skumps (Drinking Song) / The Royal Argument"	George Bruns, Tom Adair & Ed Penner	Bill Thompson and Taylor Holmes	4:09
12.	"Prince Phillip Arrives / How to Tell Stefan"	George Bruns	George Bruns	2:26
13.	"Aurora's Return / Maleficent's Evil Spell"	George Bruns	George Bruns	5:06
14.	"Poor Aurora / Sleeping Beauty"	George Bruns & Tom Adair	Disney Studio Chorus	2:57
15.	"Forbidden Mountain"	George Bruns	George Bruns	2:51
16.	"A Fairy Tale Come True"	George Bruns	George Bruns	2:48
17.	"Battle with the Forces of Evil"	George Bruns	George Bruns	5:11
18.	"Awakening"	George Bruns	George Bruns	2:44
19.	"Finale"	George Bruns	George Bruns	1:43
Total length:				1:02:43

Disc 2
No.	Title	Writer(s)	Performer(s)	Length
1.	"It Happens I Have a Picture (Demo)"	Jack Lawrence & Sammy Fain	Hans Conried and Bill Thompson	2:20
2.	"It Happens I Have a Picture"	Jack Lawrence & Sammy Fain	Dennis Kyle and Randy Crenshaw	2:26
3.	"Riddle, Diddle, One, Two, Three (Demo)"	George Bruns, Ted Sears & Winston Hibler	Verna Felton, Barbara Jo Allen and Coleen Collins	2:14
4.	"Riddle, Diddle, One, Two, Three"	George Bruns, Ted Sears & Winston Hibler	Cindy Robinson and Linda Kerns	3:29
5.	"Evil - Evil (Demo)"	George Bruns, Tom Adair & Ed Penner	Hans Conried and Bill Thompson	2:37
6.	"Evil - Evil"	George Bruns, Tom Adair & Ed Penner	Jeff Gunn, Randy Crenshaw and Dennis Kyle	4:27
7.	"Sleeping Beauty Overture"	George Bruns, Tom Adair & Tutti Camarata	Tutti Camarata Orchestra	2:56
8.	"Blue Bird / I Wonder (Album Version)"	George Bruns, Ted Sears & Winston Hibler	Mary Costa	2:43
9.	"Woodland Symphony / Once Upon a Dream (Album Version)"	George Burns / Pyotr Ilyich Tchaikovsky, Jack Lawrence & Sammy Fain	Mary Costa and Bill Lee	3:35
10.	"Love Theme from Sleeping Beauty"	George Bruns & Steve Allen	Tutti Camarata Orchestra	3:25
Total length:				30:10

== The Little Mermaid ==
The Legacy Collection: The Little Mermaid

Box set by Various artists
- Released: November 24, 2014
- Recorded: 1988–1989
- Genres: Soundtrack, film score
- Length: 1:47:13
- Label: Walt Disney
- Producers: Alan Menken; Howard Ashman; Robert Kraft

The Legacy Collection: The Little Mermaid was released as a two-disc album on November 24, 2014, to coincide with the 25th anniversary of The Little Mermaid. The album features the film's complete original soundtrack, as well as work tapes and demo recording sessions performed by composer Alan Menken and lyricist Howard Ashman.

All lyrics are written by Howard Ashman; all music is composed by Alan Menken.

Disc 1
No.	Title	Performer(s)	Length
1.	"Fathoms Below"	Ship's Chorus	1:42
2.	"Main Titles"		1:26
3.	"Fanfare"		0:28
4.	"Daughters of Triton"	Ariel's Sisters	0:52
5.	"Intro Ariel"		3:12
6.	"Intro Ursula"		2:38
7.	"Triton Reprimands"		1:49
8.	"Sebastian's Dilemma"		0:44
9.	"Part of Your World"	Jodi Benson	3:31
10.	"Fireworks"		2:11
11.	"The Storm"		3:18
12.	"Part of Your World (Reprise) / Ursula Plots"	Jodi Benson	3:03
13.	"Ariel in Love"		0:23
14.	"Under the Sea"	Samuel E. Wright	3:23
15.	"Sebastian and Triton"		1:40
16.	"Destroying the Grotto"		1:55
17.	"Flotsam and Jetsam"		1:47
18.	"Ursula's Lair"		2:17
19.	"Poor Unfortunate Souls"	Pat Carroll	4:49
20.	"She's Got Legs"		1:22
21.	"Sebastian Relents"		0:28
22.	"On Land"		2:25
23.	"Miss Manners"		1:09
24.	"Les Poissons"	René Auberjonois	2:11
25.	"Crab On a Plate / Bedtime"		2:20
26.	"Tour of the Kingdom"		1:26
27.	"Kiss the Girl"	Samuel E. Wright	2:40
28.	"Ariel Left Behind"		4:09
29.	"Poor Unfortunate Souls (Reprise)"	Jodi Benson	0:31
30.	"The Truth"		1:23
31.	"Interrupting the Wedding / Ursula's Defeat"		6:44
32.	"Happy Ending"	Disney Chorus	3:22
Total length:			01:11:18

All lyrics are written by Howard Ashman; all music is composed by Alan Menken.

Disc 2
No.	Title	Performer(s)	Length
1.	"Fathoms Below (Work Tape)"	Howard Ashman and Alan Menken	2:15
2.	"Daughters of Triton (Synth Demo)"	Howard Ashman and Alan Menken	0:56
3.	"Part of Your World (Synth Demo)"	Howard Ashman and Alan Menken	3:15
4.	"Fireworks / The Gigue (Score Piano Demo)"	Alan Menken	2:10
5.	"The Storm (Score Piano Demo)"	Alan Menken	2:35
6.	"Under the Sea (Synth Demo)"	Howard Ashman and Alan Menken	4:42
7.	"Poor Unfortunate Souls (Basic Synth Demo)"	Howard Ashman and Alan Menken	5:06
8.	"Poor Unfortunate Souls (Final Synth Mockup)"	Howard Ashman and Alan Menken	5:31
9.	"Les Poissons (Work Tape Demo)"	Howard Ashman and Alan Menken	2:09
10.	"Les Poissons (Synth Demo)"	Howard Ashman and Alan Menken	2:03
11.	"Kiss the Girl (Synth Demo B)"	Howard Ashman and Alan Menken	2:41
12.	"Happy Ending (Score Piano Demo)"	Alan Menken	2:32
Total length:			35:55

== Fantasia ==
The Legacy Collection: Fantasia

Box set by Various artists
- Released: January 13, 2015
- Recorded: 1938–1940, 1946, 1958, January 1982
- Studios: Culver Studios, Los Angeles; Academy of Music, Philadelphia; CBS Studio Center, Los Angeles
- Genres: Classical and film score
- Length: 3:56:45
- Label: Walt Disney
- Producers: Leopold Stokowski; Irwin Kostal

The Legacy Collection: Fantasia was released as a four-disc album on January 13, 2015, to coincide with the 75th anniversary of Fantasia. The album features the original recordings conducted by the late Leopold Stokowski and performed by the Philadelphia Orchestra, as well as the 1982 digital re-recordings conducted by the late Irwin Kostal, two bonus tracks narrated by Sterling Holloway, and the previously unreleased recording of Clair de Lune, a segment that was cut from the final running order.

Disc 1
No.	Title	Writer(s)	Performer(s)	Length
1.	"Toccata and Fugue in D minor, BWV 565"	Johann Sebastian Bach (transcription for orchestra by Leopold Stokowski)	Leopold Stokowski and the Philadelphia Orchestra	9:25
2.	"Dance of the Sugar Plum Fairy (Note: The Nutcracker Suite, OP. 71A)"	Peter Ilich Tchaikovsky	Leopold Stokowski and the Philadelphia Orchestra	2:36
3.	"Chinese Dance"	Peter Ilich Tchaikovsky	Leopold Stokowski and the Philadelphia Orchestra	1:03
4.	"Dance of the Reed Flutes"	Peter Ilich Tchaikovsky	Leopold Stokowski and the Philadelphia Orchestra	1:49
5.	"Arabian Dance"	Peter Ilich Tchaikovsky	Leopold Stokowski and the Philadelphia Orchestra	3:15
6.	"Russian Dance"	Peter Ilich Tchaikovsky	Leopold Stokowski and the Philadelphia Orchestra	1:07
7.	"Waltz of the Flowers"	Peter Ilich Tchaikovsky	Leopold Stokowski and the Philadelphia Orchestra	4:27
8.	"The Sorcerer's Apprentice"	Paul Dukas	Leopold Stokowski and the Philadelphia Orchestra	9:19
9.	"Rite of Spring"	Igor Stravinsky	Leopold Stokowski and the Philadelphia Orchestra	22:24
Total length:				55:25

Disc 2
No.	Title	Writer(s)	Performer(s)	Length
1.	"I Allegro Ma Non Troppo (Note: Symphony NO. 6 ("Pastoral:), OP. 68)"	Ludwig van Beethoven	Leopold Stokowski and the Philadelphia Orchestra	4:39
2.	"II Andante Molto Mosso"	Ludwig van Beethoven	Leopold Stokowski and the Philadelphia Orchestra	6:25
3.	"III Allegro, IV Allegro, V Allegretto"	Ludwig van Beethoven	Leopold Stokowski and the Philadelphia Orchestra	10:58
4.	"Dance of the Hours (Note: From the Opera "La Gioconda")"	Amilcare Ponchielli	Leopold Stokowski and the Philadelphia Orchestra	12:15
5.	"A Night on Bald Mountain"	Modeste Moussorgsky	Leopold Stokowski and the Philadelphia Orchestra	7:25
6.	"Ave Maria, Op. 52 No. 6"	Franz Schubert	Leopold Stokowski and the Philadelphia Orchestra	6:28
7.	"The Sorcerer's Apprentice"	Paul Dukas	Sterling Holloway	9:32
8.	"Clair de Lune ('Moonlight') (Note: From "Suite Bergamasque" (CD 82/3)"	Claude Debussy	Leopold Stokowski and the Philadelphia Orchestra	5:49
Total length:				1:03:31

Disc 3
No.	Title	Writer(s)	Performer(s)	Length
1.	"Toccata and Fugue in D minor, BWV 565"	Johann Sebastian Bach	Irwin Kostal and the Disney Studio Orchestra	9:29
2.	"Dance of the Sugar Plum Fairy"	Peter Ilich Tchaikovsky	Irwin Kostal and the Disney Studio Orchestra	2:42
3.	"Chinese Dance"	Peter Ilich Tchaikovsky	Irwin Kostal and the Disney Studio Orchestra	1:03
4.	"Dance of the Reed Flutes"	Peter Ilich Tchaikovsky	Irwin Kostal and the Disney Studio Orchestra	1:51
5.	"Arabian Dance"	Peter Ilich Tchaikovsky	Irwin Kostal and the Disney Studio Orchestra	3:21
6.	"Russian Dance"	Peter Ilich Tchaikovsky	Irwin Kostal and the Disney Studio Orchestra	1:05
7.	"Waltz of the Flowers"	Peter Ilich Tchaikovsky	Irwin Kostal and the Disney Studio Orchestra	4:31
8.	"The Sorcerer's Apprentice"	Paul Dukas	Irwin Kostal and the Disney Studio Orchestra	9:25
9.	"Rite of Spring"	Igor Stravinsky	Irwin Kostal and the Disney Studio Orchestra	22:28
Total length:				55:55

Disc 4
No.	Title	Writer(s)	Performer(s)	Length
1.	"I Allegro Ma Non Troppo"	Ludwig van Beethoven	Irwin Kostal and the Disney Studio Orchestra	4:40
2.	"II Andante Molto Mosso"	Ludwig van Beethoven	Irwin Kostal and the Disney Studio Orchestra	6:04
3.	"III Allegro, IV Allegro, V Allegretto"	Ludwig van Beethoven	Irwin Kostal and the Disney Studio Orchestra	10:49
4.	"Dance of the Hours"	Amilcare Ponchielli	Irwin Kostal and the Disney Studio Orchestra	12:18
5.	"A Night on Bald Mountain"	Modeste Moussorgsky	Irwin Kostal and the Disney Studio Orchestra	8:45
6.	"Ave Maria, Op. 52 No. 6"	Franz Schubert	Irwin Kostal and the Disney Studio Orchestra	5:00
7.	"Peter and the Wolf (from Make Mine Music)"	Sergei Prokofiev	Sterling Holloway and the Munich Symphony Orchestra	14:18
Total length:				1:01:54

== Pinocchio ==
The Legacy Collection: Pinocchio

Box set by Various artists
- Released: February 10, 2015
- Recorded: 1939, 1955, 2015
- Genres: Soundtrack, film score
- Length: 1:15:52
- Label: Walt Disney

The Legacy Collection: Pinocchio was released as a two-disc album on February 10, 2015, to coincide with the 75th anniversary of Pinocchio. The album includes the film's complete soundtrack, three "Lost Chords" recordings, and five bonus tracks from The Mickey Mouse Club.

All songs are composed by Leigh Harline, with lyrics by Ned Washington. All scores are composed by Harline and Paul Smith

Disc 1
No.	Title	Performer(s)	Length
1.	"When You Wish Upon a Star"	Cliff Edwards and the Disney Studio Chorus	3:15
2.	"Little Wooden Head"	Leigh Harline	5:45
3.	"Clock Sequence"	Paul Smith and Rees	0:54
4.	"Kitten Theme"	Leigh Harline	0:39
5.	"The Blue Fairy"	Leigh Harline and Paul J. Smith	3:27
6.	"Give a Little Whistle"	Cliff Edwards and Dickie Jones	1:37
7.	"Old Geppetto"	Leigh Harline	4:43
8.	"Off to School"	Leigh Harline	4:18
9.	"Hi-Diddle-Dee-Dee (An Actor's Life for Me)"	Walter Catlett	1:40
10.	"So Sorry"	Leigh Harline	1:36
11.	"I've Got No Strings"	Dickie Jones	2:22
12.	"Sinister Stromboli"	Leigh Harline	2:27
13.	"Sad Reunion"	Leigh Harline	3:21
14.	"Lesson in Lies"	Leigh Harline	2:30
15.	"Turn on the Old Music Box"	Paul Smith	0:49
16.	"Coach to Pleasure Island"	Leigh Harline, Paul J. Smith, and Ned Washington	4:45
17.	"Angry Cricket"	Leigh Harline	1:19
18.	"Transformation"	Leigh Harline	3:50
19.	"Message from the Blue Fairy"	Leigh Harline and Paul J. Smith	1:30
20.	"To the Rescue"	Leigh Harline and Paul J. Smith	0:33
21.	"Deep Ripples"	Leigh Harline and Paul J. Smith	1:29
22.	"Desolation Theme"	Leigh Harline	1:42
23.	"Monstro Awakens"	Leigh Harline	2:03
24.	"Whale Chase"	Leigh Harline and Edward H. Plumb	3:18
25.	"A Real Boy"	Cliff Edwards and the Disney Studio Chorus	1:41
Total length:			61:33

Tracks 4–8 are written by Jimmie Dodd.

Disc 2
No.	Title	Performer(s)	Length
1.	"No Strings"	Kate Higgins, Cindy Robinson, Randy Crenshaw and Jeff Gunn	1:02
2.	"As I Was Sayin' to the Duchess"	Randy Crenshaw	1:10
3.	"Rolling Along to Pleasure Island"	Kate Higgins, Cindy Robinson, Randy Crenshaw and Jeff Gunn	1:40
4.	"You (Are a Human Animal)"	Cliff Edwards and the Disney Studio Chorus	1:40
5.	"Mickey Mouse Club Book Song"	Cliff Edwards and the Disney Studio Chorus	1:37
6.	"I'm No Fool (On a Bike)"	Cliff Edwards, The Mouseketeers and the Disney Studio Chorus	1:46
7.	"Safety First / I'm No Fool (In Water)"	Cliff Edwards	2:26
8.	"Stop, Look and Listen / I'm No Fool (As a Pedestrian)"	Cliff Edwards	2:58
Total length:			14:19

== Lady and the Tramp ==
The Legacy Collection: Lady and the Tramp

Box set by Various artists
- Released: April 28, 2015; August 21, 2015
- Recorded: 1954–1955, 2015
- Genres: Soundtrack, film score
- Length: 1:15:25
- Label: Walt Disney

The Legacy Collection: Lady and the Tramp was released on April 28, 2015, as a two-disc album to coincide with the 60th anniversary of Lady and the Tramp. The album includes the film's complete original soundtrack, one demo recording, two "Lost Chords" recordings, and six bonus tracks. The album was released in traditional retail forms on August 21, 2015.

All songs are written by Peggy Lee and Sonny Burke. All scores are composed by Oliver Wallace.

Disc 1
No.	Title	Performer(s)	Length
1.	"Main Title (Bella Notte) / The Wag of a Dog's Tail"	Disney Studio Chorus	2:03
2.	"Peace on Earth"	Donald Novis and Disney Studio Chorus	1:01
3.	"It Has a Ribbon / Lady to Bed / A Few Mornings Later"	Oliver Wallace	3:53
4.	"Sunday / The Rat / Morning Paper"	Oliver Wallace	1:44
5.	"A New Collar / Jock & Trusty / It's Jim Dear"	Oliver Wallace	3:17
6.	"What a Day! / Breakfast at Tony's"	Oliver Wallace	1:05
7.	"Warning / Breakout / Snob Hill / A Wee Bairn"	Oliver Wallace	2:44
8.	"Countdown to B-Day"	Oliver Wallace	2:05
9.	"Baby's First Morning / What Is a Baby / La La Lu"	Peggy Lee	3:11
10.	"Going Away / Aunt Sarah"	Oliver Wallace	1:51
11.	"The Siamese Cat Song / What's Going on Down There"	Peggy Lee	2:36
12.	"The Muzzle / Wrong Side of the Tracks"	Oliver Wallace	1:54
13.	"You Poor Kid / He's Not My Dog"	Oliver Wallace	1:23
14.	"Through the Zoo / A Log Puller"	Oliver Wallace	1:59
15.	"Footloose and Collar-Free / Bella Notte"	George Givot, Bill Thompson and the Disney Studio Chorus	4:22
16.	"It's Morning / Ever Chase Chickens / Caught"	Oliver Wallace	2:51
17.	"Home Sweet Home"	The Mellomen	1:31
18.	"The Pound"	Oliver Wallace	1:27
19.	"What a Dog / He's a Tramp"	Peggy Lee and The Mellomen	2:24
20.	"In the Doghouse / The Rat Returns / Falsely Accused / We've Got to Stop That Wagon / Trusty's Sacrifice"	Oliver Wallace	6:05
21.	"Watch the Birdie / Visitors"	Oliver Wallace	2:05
22.	"Finale (Peace on Earth)"	Disney Studio Chorus	0:30
Total length:			52:01

Disc 2
No.	Title	Performer(s)	Length
1.	"I'm Free As the Breeze (Demo)"	Disney Studio Vocalist	2:29
2.	"I'm Free As the Breeze"	Jeff Gunn	3:13
3.	"I'm Singin' ('Cause I Want to Sing)"	Jeff Gunn	1:47
4.	"What Is a Baby"	Teri York	3:25
5.	"La La Lu"	Teri York	2:48
6.	"The Siamese Cat Song"	Robie Lester	2:43
7.	"Bella Notte"	Bob Grabeau	2:40
8.	"He's a Tramp"	Teri York	2:09
9.	"Peace on Earth"	Teri York	2:10
Total length:			23:24

== Disneyland ==
The Legacy Collection: Disneyland

Box set by Various artists
- Released: May 20, 2015; August 21, 2015
- Recorded: 1955–2015
- Genres: Soundtrack, ambient music, experimental music
- Length: 3:47:21
- Label: Walt Disney
- Producer: Randy Thornton

The Legacy Collection: Disneyland was released exclusively at the Disneyland Resort on May 20, 2015, commemorating the resort's 60th anniversary. The three-disc album consists entirely of music, songs and audio, featured across a variety of attractions at both Disneyland and Disney California Adventure. The album was released in traditional retail forms on August 21, 2015.

Disc 1 - Disneyland Park
No.	Title	Writer(s)	Performer(s)	Length
1.	"Walt Disney's Dedication of Disneyland"	Dialogue	Walt Disney	0:42
2.	"All Aboard!"	Dialogue	Jack Wagner	0:31
3.	"Married Life"	Michael Giacchino	Michael Giacchino	2:25
4.	"Great Moments with Mr. Lincoln"	Buddy Baker	Buddy Baker	5:54
5.	"Let's Dance at Disneyland"	James Lee MacDonald and Stuart Darlington Ludlum	The Elliott Brothers	2:12
6.	"The Tiki, Tiki, Tiki Room"	Richard M. Sherman and Robert B. Sherman	Wally Boag, Fulton Burley, Ernie Newton, Thurl Ravenscroft, and The Mellomen	3:28
7.	"Indiana Jones Adventure"	John Williams	Richard Bellis	3:25
8.	"Swisskapolka"	Buddy Baker and Bob Jackman	Buddy Baker and Bob Jackman	1:53
9.	"Tarzan Medley (Note: Includes "Strangers Like Me", "You'll Be in My Heart", "Sabor Attacked”, and "Two Worlds")"	Phil Collins and Mark Mancina		2:39
10.	"Yo Ho (A Pirate's Life for Me)"	George Bruns and Xavier Atencio	Xavier Atencio, Paul Frees, Thurl Ravenscroft, and J. Pat O'Malley	5:44
11.	"Grim Grinning Ghosts"	Buddy Baker and Xavier Atencio	Paul Frees, Betty Taylor, Bill Lee, Thurl Ravenscroft, and The Mellomen	5:32
12.	"The Bear Band Serenade"	George Bruns and Xavier Atencio	Pete Renoudet	1:45
13.	"Splash Mountain Medley (Note: Includes "How Do You Do?", "Ev'rybody Has a Laughing Place", and "Zip-a-Dee-Doo-Dah")"	Robert MacGimsey, Allie Wrubel, and Ray Gilbert		8:07
14.	"The Great Outdoors"	George Wilkins		2:08
15.	"The Many Adventures of Winnie the Pooh Medley (Note: Includes "Winnie the Pooh", "A Rather Blustery Day", "The Wonderful Thing About Tiggers", "Heffalumps and Woozles", "Hip Hip Pooh-Ray", and "The Rain, Rain, Rain, Came Down, Down, Down")"	Richard M. Sherman and Robert B. Sherman		4:55
16.	"Hello Everybody"	Tom Adair and Charles La Vere	Irving Berlin, Chris Calabrese, Betty Taylor, and Donald Novis	2:16
17.	"The Rainbow Caverns"	George Bruns		2:35
18.	"Once Upon a Dream"	Jack Lawrence and Sammy Fain	The Fantasyland Band Organ	2:19
19.	"The Fantasyland Darkride Suite (Pinocchio's Daring Journey, Peter Pan's Flight, Mr. Toad's Wild Ride, Alice in Wonderland) (Note: Includes "When You Wish Upon a Star", "Little Wooden Head", "Hi-Diddle-Dee-Dee (An Actor's Life for Me)" by Ned Washington and Leigh Harline, "Monstro Awakens", “Turn on the Old Music Box” by Leigh Harline, "Blue Fairy Theme" by Leigh Harline and Paul J. Smith, “The Nursery Theme” by Oliver Wallace, "You Can Fly! You Can Fly! You Can Fly!" by Sammy Cahn and Sammy Fain, "A Pirate's Life" by Ed Penner and Oliver Wallace, "Never Smile at a Crocodile" by Jack Lawrence and Frank Churchill, "The Merrily Song" by Larry Morey, Ray Gilbert, Frank Churchill and Charles Wolcott, "I'm Late", "Alice in Wonderland", "Painting the Roses Red" by Bob Hilliard and Sammy Fain, "The Tulgey Wood", "Off with Her Head" by Oliver Wallace, "Painting the Roses Red" by Bob Hilliard and Sammy Fain, "March of the Cards" by Sammy Fain, “The Unbirthday Song” by Mack David, Al Hoffman and Jerry Livingston, and "All in the Golden Afternoon" by Lewis Carroll.)"	Various		17:55
Total length:				1:16:25

Disc 2 - Disneyland Park / Disney California Adventure Park
No.	Title	Writer(s)	Performer(s)	Length
1.	"Matterhorn Yodelers"		Matterhorn Yodelers	2:19
2.	"It's a Small World Clock Parade"	Richard M. Sherman and Robert B. Sherman		2:32
3.	"It's a Small World"	Richard M. Sherman and Robert B. Sherman	Disney Studio Chorus	5:04
4.	"Steamboat Willie"	Lewis Bertram		2:08
5.	"Roger Rabbit's Car Toon Spin"	George Wilkins		2:27
6.	"Nation on Wheels"	George Bruns		1:43
7.	"Miracles from Molecules"	Richard M. Sherman and Robert B. Sherman	Disney Studio Chorus	1:37
8.	"Star Tours"	John Williams	Richard Bellis	4:07
9.	"There's a Great Big Beautiful Tomorrow"	Richard M. Sherman and Robert B. Sherman	Rex Allen	7:02
10.	"Space Mountain (1998 theme)"	Aarin J. Richard	Dick Dale	2:42
11.	"Buzz Lightyear's Astro-Blasters"	Randy Newman	George Wilkins	6:02
12.	"Submarine Voyage (Note: Includes "Beyond the Sea" by Jack Lawrence, Charles Trenet and Albert Lasry.)"	Thomas Newman and Ed Kalnins	Thomas Newman and Ed Kalnins	15:12
13.	"The Throne Room"	John Williams	Michael Giacchino	0:58
14.	"Honey, I Shrunk the Audience! Theme"	Bruce Broughton	Bruce Broughton	1:47
15.	"Space Mountain (2005 theme)"	Michael Giacchino	Michael Giacchino	3:11
16.	"Suitcase and a Dream"	Jason Milligan and Bruce Healey	Bret Iwan, Daniel Payson-Lewis, Jacob Haren, and Andrew Johnson	2:40
17.	"Who's Afraid of the Big Bad Wolf"	Frank Churchill and Ann Ronell		2:56
18.	"Mike and Sulley to the Rescue (Note: Includes "If I Didn't Have You", "Downtown Monsterville", "Back Alley”, "Employee Entrance", and "Scare Floor A")"	Randy Newman	Jonathan Sacks	6:54
19.	"The Twilight Zone Tower of Terror Theme (Note: Includes "The Twilight Zone Theme" by Marius Constant and “Tower of Terror" Theme by Richard Bellis.)"	Marius Constant and Richard Bellis	Richard Bellis	1:42
20.	"Soarin'"	Jerry Goldsmith	Jerry Goldsmith	4:42
Total length:				1:17:45

Disc 3 - Disney California Adventure Park / Disneyland Spectaculars
No.	Title	Writer(s)	Performer(s)	Length
1.	"The Bakery Theme"	Dan Foliart	Dan Foliart	3:27
2.	"A Bug's Life Suite"	Randy Newman	Randy Newman	4:25
3.	"Beauty and the Beast"	Alan Menken and Howard Ashman	Bruce Broughton and George Wilkins	2:18
4.	"It's Tough to Be a Bug!"	George Wilkins and Kevin Rafferty		0:45
5.	"The Little Mermaid Medley (Note: Includes "Tour of the Kingdom", "Fathoms Below", "Part of Your World", "Under the Sea", "Flotsam and Jetsam", "Poor Unfortunate Souls", "Kiss the Girl", and "Happy Ending".)"	Alan Menken and Howard Ashman		8:47
6.	"Seasons of the Vine Medley"	Bruce Broughton	Bruce Broughton	4:30
7.	"Midway Mania"	Paul Chrisman, Joey Miskulin, Douglas Green, and Fred LaBour	Don Rickles	1:55
8.	"The Cleaner"	Randy Newman		2:10
9.	"California Screamin'"	Gary Hoey and George Wilkins		2:33
10.	"Welcome to Radiator Springs"	Bruno Coon	Larry the Cable Guy	1:33
11.	"Funiculi Funicula"	Luigi Denza and Peppino Turco	Craig Copeland, Chris Hardin, Andrea Datzman, and Amy Wells	2:10
12.	"Radiator Springs Racers (Note: Includes "Sally's Ride", "Lost", "Into Town", "New Road", "Frank", "A New Customer", "Piston Cup Pageantry", "On Your Mark" "Doc Racing", "New Road", and "Behind the Clouds" by Brad Paisley and Frank Rogers.)"	Randy Newman and Jonathan Sacks		5:27
13.	"Main Street Electrical Parade (Note: Includes "Baroque Hoedown" by Jean-Jacques Perrey and Gershon Kingsley, "Alice in Wonderland" by Bob Hilliard and Sammy Fain, "The Unbirthday Song" by Mack David, Al Hoffman and Jerry Livingston, "Following the Leader" by Ted Sears, Winston Hibler and Oliver Wallace, "You Can Fly! You Can Fly! You Can Fly!", "The Elegant Captain Hook" by Sammy Fain and Sammy Cahn, "Casey Junior" by Frank Churchill and Ned Washington, “Dig, Dig, Dig” by Larry Morey and Frank Churchill, "Brazzle Dazzle Day”, “Boo Bop Bopbop Bop (I Love You, Too)” by Al Kasha and Joel Hirschorn.)"	Various	Don Dorsey and Jack Wagner	9:16
14.	"Fantasmic! (Note: Includes "The Sorcerer's Apprentice" by Paul Dukas, "Pink Elephants on Parade" by Ned Washington and Oliver Wallace, "I've Got No Strings", "Little Wooden Head", "When You Wish Upon a Star" by Ned Washington and Leigh Harline, "Peter Pan Theme" by Jack Wallace and Victor Young, "The Elegant Captain Hook" by Sammy Cahn and Sammy Fain, "Never Smile at a Crocodile" by Jack Lawrence and Frank Churchill, "Beauty and the Beast", "Poor Unfortunate Souls" by Alan Menken and Howard Ashman, "Some Day My Prince Will Come" by Larry Morey and Frank Churchill, and "Night on Bald Mountain" by Modeste Moussorgsky.)"	Bruce Healey and Barnette Ricci	Bruce Healey	22:41
15.	"Closing"	Jimmie Dodd	Wayne Allwine, Russi Taylor, Bill Farmer, and Tony Anselmo	1:14
Total length:				1:13:11

== Cinderella ==
The Legacy Collection: Cinderella

Box set by Various artists
- Released: June 16, 2015
- Recorded: 1949, 2015
- Genres: Soundtrack, film score
- Length: 1:43:51
- Label: Walt Disney

The Legacy Collection: Cinderella was released as a two-disc album on June 16, 2015, to coincide with the 65th anniversary of Cinderella. The album includes the film's original soundtrack, seven demo recordings, seven "Lost Chords" recordings, and nine bonus tracks.

All tracks are written by Oliver Wallace and Paul J. Smith unless where otherwise noted.

Disc 1
No.	Title	Writer(s)	Performer(s)	Length
1.	"Main Title / Cinderella"	Oliver Wallace and Paul J. Smith	Disney Studio Chorus and Marni Nixon	2:51
2.	"A Dream Is a Wish Your Heart Makes"	Mack David, Al Hoffman, and Jerry Livingston	Ilene Woods and Mice Chorus	4:34
3.	"A Visitor / Caught in a Trap / Lucifer / Feed the Chickens / Breakfast Is Served / Time on Our Hands"	Oliver Wallace and Paul J. Smith	Disney Studio Orchestra	2:10
4.	"The King's Plan"	Oliver Wallace and Paul J. Smith	Disney Studio Orchestra	1:21
5.	"The Music Lesson / Oh, Sing Sweet Nightingale / Bad Boy Lucifer / A Message from His Majesty"	Oliver Wallace and Paul J. Smith	Ilene Woods with Rhoda Williams	2:06
6.	"Little Dressmakers / The Work Song / Scavenger Hunt / A Dream Is a Wish Your Heart Makes / The Dress / My Beads / Escape to the Garden"	Oliver Wallace and Paul J. Smith	The Mouse Chorus	9:24
7.	"Where Did I Put That Thing / Bibbidi-Bobbidi-Boo (The Magic Song)"	Mack David, Al Hoffman, and Jerry Livingston	Verna Felton	4:47
8.	"Reception at the Palace / So This Is Love"	Mack David, Al Hoffman, and Jerry Livingston	Ilene Woods and Mike Douglas	5:44
9.	"The Stroke of Midnight / Thank You Fairy Godmother"	Oliver Wallace and Paul J. Smith	Disney Studio Orchestra	2:05
10.	"Locked in the Tower / Gus and Jaq to the Rescue / Slipper Fittings / Cinderella's Slipper / Finale"	Oliver Wallace and Paul J. Smith	Disney Studio Orchestra	7:36
Total length:				42:38

Disc 2
No.	Title	Performer(s)	Length
1.	"I'm in the Middle of a Muddle (Demo)"	Mack David, Al Hoffman, and Jerry Livingston	1:53
2.	"I'm in the Middle of a Muddle"	Kate Higgins	1:54
3.	"I Lost My Heart at the Ball (Demo)"	Larry Morey and Charles Wolcott	2:00
4.	"I Lost My Heart at the Ball"	Jennifer Paz	2:18
5.	"The Mouse Song (Demo)"	Larry Morey and Charles Wolcott	1:37
6.	"The Mouse Song"	Jeff Gunn and Rob Paulsen	1:38
7.	"Sing a Little, Dream a Little (Demo)"	Larry Morey and Charles Wolcott	2:47
8.	"Sing a Little, Dream a Little"	Juliana Hansen	2:54
9.	"Dancing on a Cloud (Demo)"	Larry Morey and Charles Wolcott	3:45
10.	"Dancing on a Cloud"	Kate Higgins and Jeff Gunn	4:10
11.	"The Dress That My Mother Wore (Demo)"	Larry Morey and Charles Wolcott	2:35
12.	"The Dress That My Mother Wore"	Juliana Hansen	2:52
13.	"The Face That I See in the Night (Demo)"	Larry Morey and Charles Wolcott	2:32
14.	"The Face That I See in the Night"	Jeff Gunn and Jennifer Paz	2:54
15.	"Cinderella: Prologue"	Disney Studio Orchestra	4:40
16.	"Cat and Mice / The King's Plans"	Disney Studio Orchestra	3:50
17.	"Entanglements / Dress Building"	Disney Studio Orchestra	5:04
18.	"The Palace at Evening / A Dress for the Ball"	Disney Studio Orchestra	2:56
19.	"Royal Fanfare and Reception at the Palace"	Disney Studio Orchestra	2:44
20.	"So This Is Love: Waltz"	Mack David, Al Hoffman, Jerry Livingston	1:58
21.	"Midnight Chase"	Oliver Wallace	1:36
22.	"A Perfect Fit"	Paul J. Smith	1:30
23.	"Cinderella: Finale"	Disney Studio Orchestra	1:06
Total length:			1:01:13

== Toy Story ==
The Legacy Collection: Toy Story

Box set by Randy Newman
- Released: July 10, 2015
- Recorded: 1994–1995
- Studios: Sony Pictures Studios; Conway Recording Studios; Ocean Way Recording
- Genres: Soundtrack, film score
- Length: 1:27:52
- Label: Walt Disney
- Producers: Chris Montan; Frank Wolf; Don Davis; Jim Flamberg; Randy Newman

The Legacy Collection: Toy Story was released as a two-disc album on July 10, 2015, to coincide with the 20th anniversary of Toy Story. The album features the film's complete original soundtrack, four demo recordings, and three instrumental versions of the film's three songs, as well as thanks from composer Randy Newman and director John Lasseter to the orchestra.

All songs and score written, performed and composed by Randy Newman, unless otherwise noted.

Disc 1
No.	Title	Performer(s)	Length
1.	"Opening"		1:28
2.	"You've Got a Friend in Me"		2:04
3.	"Andy's Birthday Is Today"		0:42
4.	"They're Alive!"		1:12
5.	"'Staff Meeting Everybody!'"		0:43
6.	"'You Too, Bo Peep'"		0:39
7.	"Andy's Birthday Party"		1:33
8.	"Code Red"		1:30
9.	"A Good Soldier Never Leaves a Man Behind"		0:37
10.	"Presents: Who Invited That Kid?"		1:19
11.	"Surprise Present"		1:09
12.	"'What Are You Doing Under the Bed?'"		0:22
13.	"Buzz Revealed"		1:07
14.	"Buzz Flies"		0:44
15.	"Strange Things"		3:25
16.	"Woody/Bo Peep"		0:20
17.	"Sid"		1:22
18.	"Virtual Realty"		0:17
19.	"Woody Plots"		0:58
20.	"Rube Globeburg"		0:25
21.	"'Woody Did It!'"		1:07
22.	"Rescue Attempt"		1:11
23.	"'Buzz, You're Alive!'"		0:32
24.	"Buzz and Woody Fight"		0:35
25.	"Buzz's Mission"		0:19
26.	"'It's a Spaceship, Buzz'"		0:58
27.	"Pizza Planet Rock"		0:37
28.	"'What? Hello? A Space Port!'"		1:28
29.	"The Claw"		2:18
30.	"Dr. Sid"		1:09
31.	"Mutant Toys"		1:12
32.	"Woody's Gone"		0:52
33.	"'Sorry Guys, Dinner's Canceled'"		0:53
34.	"Scud"		0:45
35.	"Buzz Lightyear Commercial"		0:54
36.	"I Will Go Sailing No More"		3:02
37.	"Out the Window"		0:45
38.	"Sid's Toys Fix Buzz"		1:29
39.	"The Big One"		1:23
40.	"Sad Andy"		0:47
41.	"'Buzz, I Need Your Help'"		2:16
42.	"Working Together (Leads to Failure)"		0:45
43.	"The Rescue Pt. 1"		3:41
44.	"Sid Counts Down"		1:09
45.	"The Rescue Pt. 2: Play Nice, Sid"		1:30
46.	"Chasing the Van"		1:42
47.	"RC to the Rescue"		2:28
48.	"To Infinity and Beyond"		2:12
49.	"Together Again and a Very Merry Christmas"		1:47
50.	"You've Got a Friend in Me"	Randy Newman and Lyle Lovett	2:40
51.	"End Credits"		2:21
Total length:			1:07:04

Disc 2
No.	Title	Performer(s)	Length
1.	"Strange Things (Piano/Vocal Demo)"		3:00
2.	"Plastic Spaceman (Piano/Vocal Demo)"		3:20
3.	"I Will Go Sailing No More (Piano/Vocal Demo)"		3:37
4.	"The Fool (Piano/Vocal/Background Vocal Demo)"		2:08
5.	"You've Got a Friend in Me (Instrumental)"		2:06
6.	"Strange Things (Instrumental)"		3:19
7.	"I Will Go Sailing No More (Instrumental)"		2:57
8.	"Thanking the Orchestra"	Randy Newman and John Lasseter	0:41
Total length:			21:11

== Pocahontas ==
The Legacy Collection: Pocahontas

Box set by Various artists
- Released: August 7, 2015
- Recorded: 1994–1995
- Studios: Todd-AO Studios, Los Angeles; Signet Sound Studios, Los Angeles; Paramount Stage M, Hollywood; The Hit Factory, New York City; Sony Music Studios, New York City
- Genres: Soundtrack; film score
- Length: 1:49:33
- Label: Walt Disney
- Producers: Alan Menken; Stephen Schwartz; Emilio Estefan, Jr.; Robbie Buchanan; Keith Thomas; Chris Montan; Bruce Botnick

The Legacy Collection: Pocahontas was released on August 7, 2015, as a two-disc album to coincide with the 20th anniversary of Pocahontas. The release includes the film's complete original soundtrack and five demo recordings.

All lyrics are written by Stephen Schwartz; all music is composed by Alan Menken.

Disc 1
No.	Title	Performer(s)	Length
1.	"The Virginia Company"	Mel Gibson and Chorus	5:26
2.	"Steady as the Beating Drum"	Chorus	2:04
3.	"Pocahontas"		2:08
4.	"Father Knows Best"		1:11
5.	"Steady as the Beating Drum (Reprise)"	Jim Cummings	0:50
6.	"Just Around the Riverbend"	Judy Kuhn	2:47
7.	"Grandmother Willow"		2:08
8.	"Listen With Your Heart I"	Linda Hunt and Bobbi Page	1:12
9.	"Ratcliffe's Cabin"		1:28
10.	"Going Ashore"		0:44
11.	"Pocahontas Watches / Meeko"		1:52
12.	"Council Meeting"		1:19
13.	"Percy's Bath"		1:04
14.	"Mine, Mine, Mine"	David Ogden Stiers, Mel Gibson, and Chorus	3:34
15.	"Cat 'N' Mouse"		1:30
16.	"They Meet at the River's Edge"		2:49
17.	"Skirmish"		1:43
18.	"Unusual Name"		3:46
19.	"Colors of the Wind"	Judy Kuhn	3:50
20.	"Something Wrong, John?"		1:34
21.	"Into the Glade"		3:01
22.	"Listen With Your Heart II"	Linda Hunt and Bobbi Page	1:09
23.	"Warriors Arrive"		3:03
24.	"Smith Returns"		1:47
25.	"Sneaking Out"		2:53
26.	"The Fight"		2:09
27.	"Aftermath"		2:06
28.	"I'll Never See Him Again"		1:53
Total length:			60:44

Disc 2
No.	Title	Performer(s)	Length
1.	"If I Never Knew You"	Mel Gibson and Judy Kuhn	3:21
2.	"Thomas Reports"		0:45
3.	"Savages"	David Ogden Stiers, Jim Cummings, Judy Kuhn, and Chorus	3:58
4.	"Execution"		1:37
5.	"Now's Our Chance"		1:06
6.	"Farewell"	Judy Kuhn, Mel Gibson, and Chorus	5:08
7.	"If I Never Knew You (Love Theme)"	Jon Secada and Shanice	4:14
8.	"Colors of the Wind (End Title)"	Vanessa Williams	4:20
9.	"Epiphany / Savages (Part 2) (Alternate version)"	Alan Menken	2:02
10.	"Just Around the Riverbend (Demo)"	Alan Menken	5:29
11.	"If I Never Knew You (Demo)"	Alan Menken	3:10
12.	"Different Drummer (Demo)"	Alan Menken	3:55
13.	"First to Dance (Demo)"	Alan Menken	4:40
14.	"In the Middle of the River (Demo)"	Alan Menken	4:10
Total length:			47:49

== The Aristocats ==
The Legacy Collection: The Aristocats

Box set by Various artists
- Released: August 21, 2015
- Recorded: 1969–1970, 2015
- Genres: Soundtrack, film score
- Length: 1:32:16
- Label: Walt Disney

The Legacy Collection: The Aristocats was released on August 21, 2015, as a two-disc album to coincide with the 45th anniversary of The Aristocats. The album features the film's complete original soundtrack—released for the first time in its entirety—as well as, four demo recordings, four "Lost Chords" recordings, and five bonus tracks.

Disc 1
No.	Title	Writer(s)	Performer(s)	Length
1.	"Main Title / The Aristocats"	Richard M. Sherman and Robert B. Sherman	Maurice Chevalier	2:54
2.	"Thanks Ed / Up the Staircase"	George Bruns		1:30
3.	"Duet of Micaela and Don José"	Georges Bizet		0:48
4.	"Habanera"	Georges Bizet		1:06
5.	"The Will / Kitten Fun"	George Bruns		0:55
6.	"Alley Cat / Sleep Kitten"	George Bruns		1:58
7.	"Scales and Arpeggios"	Richard M. Sherman and Robert B. Sherman	Liz English, Robie Lester, Dean Clark and Gary Dubin	1:42
8.	"Nice Melody"	George Bruns		2:01
9.	"The Butler Sneak"	George Bruns		1:32
10.	"Two Dogs and a Cycle"	George Bruns		2:02
11.	"Cold Nights / No Cats"	George Bruns		2:03
12.	"Thomas O'Malley Cat"	Terry Gilkyson	Phil Harris	2:42
13.	"Cat's Love Theme"	George Bruns		2:33
14.	"Cat's Meow"	George Bruns		0:39
15.	"She Never Felt Alone"	Richard M. Sherman and Robert B. Sherman	Robie Lester	1:05
16.	"It's the Butler / Headlines"	George Bruns		0:50
17.	"Nine Lives / Railroad Depot"	George Bruns		2:08
18.	"Safe"	George Bruns		0:56
19.	"The Goose Steps High"	George Bruns		2:12
20.	"How Romantic / The Goose Steps High Again"	George Bruns		2:24
21.	"Here Comes Edgar"	George Bruns		1:27
22.	"The Butler Speaks"	George Bruns		1:25
23.	"Git It Good / The Butler Did It"	George Bruns		1:14
24.	"My Paree"	George Bruns		0:55
25.	"Ev'rybody Wants to Be a Cat"	Floyd Huddleston and Al Rinker	Scatman Crothers, Phil Harris, Thurl Ravenscroft, Robie Lester and Liz English	6:07
26.	"Paris Night"	George Bruns		2:55
27.	"Pretty Melody"	George Bruns		1:31
28.	"My Paree"	George Bruns		0:59
29.	"Where Are My Cats"	George Bruns		0:49
30.	"Find O'Malley"	George Bruns		0:58
31.	"Blues"	George Bruns		0:53
32.	"Cat Chase"	George Bruns		1:15
33.	"The Butler / After Her"	George Bruns		2:43
34.	"My Paree"	George Bruns		1:26
35.	"Ev'rybody Wants to be a Cat (Finale)"	Floyd Huddleston and Al Rinker	Scatman Crothers, Phil Harris, Ruth Buzzi and Chorus	1:21
Total length:				59:58

All tracks are written by Richard M. Sherman and Robert B. Sherman.

Disc 2
No.	Title	Performer(s)	Length
1.	"How Much You Mean to Me / Court Me Slowly (Demo)"	Richard M. Sherman and Robert B. Sherman	2:16
2.	"How Much You Mean to Me / Court Me Slowly"	Corey Burton and Kate Higgins	2:43
3.	"Pourquoi? (Demo)"	Richard M. Sherman	1:23
4.	"Pourquoi?"	Kate Higgins	2:12
5.	"My Way's the Highway (Demo)"	Richard M. Sherman	1:07
6.	"My Way's the Highway"	Randy Crenshaw	2:07
7.	"Le Jazz Hot (Demo)"	Richard M. Sherman	1:59
8.	"Le Jazz Hot"	Ty Taylor	2:27
9.	"The Aristocats (Album version)"	The Mike Sammes Singers	2:43
10.	"Scales and Arpeggios (Album version)"	Susan Novack, Gregory Novack, Victor Sweler and The Mike Sammes Singers	2:35
11.	"She Never Felt Alone (Album version)"	Robie Lester	2:10
12.	"Thomas O'Malley Cat (Album version)"	Phil Harris	4:42
13.	"Ev'rybody Wants to Be a Cat (Album version)"	Phil Harris and The Mike Sammes Singers	4:54
Total length:			33:18

== Robin Hood ==
The Legacy Collection: Robin Hood

Box set by Various artists
- Released: August 4, 2017
- Recorded: 1969–1973
- Studios: Walt Disney Studios, Burbank
- Genres: Soundtrack, film score
- Length: 1:30:00
- Label: Walt Disney

The Legacy Collection: Robin Hood was released on August 4, 2017, as a two-disc soundtrack album. The album features the complete original soundtrack from Robin Hood, released for the first time in its entirety. The album also includes five unreleased demos and the full 1974 album, Let's Hear It for Robin Hood.

All tracks are written by George Bruns, except where noted.

Disc 1
No.	Title	Writer(s)	Performer(s)	Length
1.	"Main Title"			0:52
2.	"Whistle Stop"	Roger Miller	Roger Miller	2:50
3.	"Oo-De-Lally"	Roger Miller	Roger Miller	0:59
4.	"Hail John"			1:52
5.	"It's Only a Circus"			1:18
6.	"Fortune Tellers"			3:07
7.	"Enter the Sheriff"			1:39
8.	"Skippy's Birthday Gift"			3:33
9.	"A Lost Arrow"			1:22
10.	"Meeting Maid Marian"			2:54
11.	"To the Winner"			1:34
12.	"The Archery Affair"			1:53
13.	"Fooling Ol' Bushel Britches"			2:02
14.	"Archer's Processional"			1:04
15.	"Sir Hiss Suspects"			0:36
16.	"Well, Well"			2:01
17.	"The Loser"			2:13
18.	"Seize the Fat One"			3:36
19.	"Fight On Wisconsin (Note: Includes "Fight On" by Milo Sweet and Glen Grant, "On, Wisconsin!" by Carl Beck and William T. Purdy.)"			0:37
20.	"There You Are"			0:22
21.	"Love"	George Bruns and Floyd Huddleston	Nancy Adams	1:56
22.	"The Phony King of England"	Johnny Mercer	Phil Harris and Andy Devine	2:45
23.	"Double the Taxes"			0:48
24.	"Not in Nottingham"	Roger Miller	Roger Miller	5:06
25.	"Not Yourself Today"			4:03
26.	"Bird Brain"			4:03
27.	"Lower the Bridge"			6:13
28.	"All's Well That Ends Well"	George Bruns, Floyd Huddleston, and Roger Miller	Nancy Adams and Disney Studio Chorus	2:01
Total length:				1:03:19

Disc 2
No.	Title	Performer(s)	Length
1.	"Whistle Stop (Ragtime Demo Instrumental)"	Roger Miller	2:21
2.	"Oo-De-Lally (Western Score Demo Instrumental)"	Roger Miller	0:58
3.	"Not in Nottingham (Prince John Demo)"	Peter Ustinov	1:02
4.	"Love (Robin Hood Version)"	Pete Renoudet	3:39
5.	"The Phony King of England (Country Version)"	Phil Harris, Andy Devine, and Disney Studio Chorus	2:41
6.	"King Louie and Robin Hood"	Louis Prima	1:23
7.	"Robin and Me"	Louis Prima	1:39
8.	"Sherwood Forest"	Louis Prima	3:15
9.	"The Phony King of England"	Louis Prima and Disney Children's Chorus	2:09
10.	"Friar Tuck"	Louis Prima	1:49
11.	"Merry Men"	Louis Prima and Disney Children's Chorus	1:34
12.	"Love"	Louis Prima	1:56
13.	"Robin Hood"	Louis Prima	2:15
Total length:			26:41

== Beauty and the Beast ==
The Legacy Collection: Beauty and the Beast

Box set by Various artists
- Released: February 9, 2018
- Recorded: 1989–1991
- Studios: Todd-AO Studios, Los Angeles; BMG Studios, New York Citywide; Barbra Streisand Scoring Stage, Culver City
- Genres: Soundtrack; film score
- Length: 2:01:47
- Label: Walt Disney
- Producers: Howard Ashman; Alan Menken; Walter Afanasieff; Bruce Botnick

The Legacy Collection: Beauty and the Beast was released on February 9, 2018, as a two-disc soundtrack album. The album features the 1991 original soundtrack from Beauty and the Beast, including deleted songs, extended score, and early demos.

All lyrics are written by Howard Ashman; all music is composed by Alan Menken.

Disc 1
No.	Title	Performer(s)	Length
1.	"Main Title - Prologue"	David Ogden Stiers	2:27
2.	"Belle"	Paige O'Hara, Richard White, and Chorus	5:06
3.	"Little Town"		2:50
4.	"Journey to the Castle"		4:54
5.	"Maurice Taken / Gaston Rejected"		3:04
6.	"Belle (Reprise)"	Paige O'Hara	1:03
7.	"Belle Enters the Beast's World"		5:59
8.	"Gaston"	Jesse Corti, Richard White, and Chorus	3:36
9.	"Gaston (Reprise)"	Jesse Corti, Richard White, and Chorus	2:01
10.	"Enchanted Objects"		6:48
11.	"Be Our Guest"	Angela Lansbury, Jerry Orbach, and Chorus	3:44
12.	"Be Our Guest (Playoff)"		0:56
13.	"Escape From the West Wing / Wolf Attack"		5:41
14.	"Coming Together"		5:11
15.	"Something There"	Angela Lansbury, David Ogden Stiers, Jerry Orbach, Paige O'Hara, and Robby Benson	2:18
Total length:			55:31

All lyrics are written by Howard Ashman; all music is composed by Alan Menken.

Disc 2
No.	Title	Performer(s)	Length
1.	"Human Again"	Angela Lansbury, Jerry Orbach, David Ogden Stiers, and Jo Anne Worley	4:53
2.	"Tonight's the Night"		1:01
3.	"Beauty and the Beast"	Angela Lansbury	2:42
4.	"Beast Lets Go"		5:35
5.	"The Mob Song"	Richard White and Chorus	3:27
6.	"Battle in the Castle"		2:27
7.	"Death of the Beast"		4:38
8.	"Transformation"	Chorus	4:13
9.	"Beauty and the Beast (Single)"	Céline Dion and Peabo Bryson	4:03
10.	"Belle – For Linda Worthington (Demo)"	Howard Ashman and Alan Menken	4:45
11.	"Belle (Demo)"	Howard Ashman and Alan Menken	4:50
12.	"Gaston (Demo)"	Howard Ashman and Alan Menken	3:42
13.	"Gaston (Reprise – Demo)"	Howard Ashman and Alan Menken	2:30
14.	"Be Our Guest (Demo)"	Howard Ashman and Alan Menken	3:28
15.	"Human Again (Demo)"	Howard Ashman and Alan Menken	9:13
16.	"Beauty and the Beast (Demo)"	Howard Ashman and Alan Menken	3:55
Total length:			1:05:16

== The Hunchback of Notre Dame ==
The Legacy Collection: The Hunchback of Notre Dame

Box set by Various artists
- Released: September 22, 2021
- Recorded: 1995–1996
- Genres: Soundtrack; film score
- Length: 2:34:52
- Label: Walt Disney
- Producers: Alan Menken; Stephen Schwartz; Walter Afanasieff

The Legacy Collection: The Hunchback of Notre Dame was released as a two-disc soundtrack album on September 22, 2021, to coincide with the 25th anniversary of The Hunchback of Notre Dame.

All lyrics are written by Stephen Schwartz; all music is composed by Alan Menken.

Disc 1
No.	Title	Performer(s)	Length
1.	"The Bells of Notre Dame"	Paul Kandel, David Ogden Stiers, Tony Jay and Chorus	6:22
2.	"Morning in the Bell Tower"		4:07
3.	"Out There"	Tony Jay and Tom Hulce	5:52
4.	"The World Outside"		3:11
5.	"Feast of Fools"		1:06
6.	"Topsy Turvy"	Paul Kandel and Chorus	5:33
7.	"The Pillory"	Chorus	3:50
8.	"Humiliation"		1:20
9.	"Frollo's Judgement"		3:05
10.	"God Help the Outcasts"	Heidi Mollenhauer and Chorus	3:42
11.	"The Cathedral"	Chorus	7:04
12.	"Heaven's Light / Hellfire"	Tom Hulce, Tony Jay and Chorus	5:58
13.	"Find the Girl"	Chorus	3:18
14.	"A Guy Like You"	Jason Alexander, Charles Kimbrough, Mary Wickes and Mary Stout	2:57
15.	"Escape"		7:51
16.	"The Court of Miracles"	Paul Kandel and Chorus	1:41
17.	"Sanctuary!"	Chorus	2:19
18.	"And He Shall Smite the Wicked (Note: Includes "Cyclone" by Herbert Stothart, George Bassman, and Georgie Stoll.)"	Chorus	8:02
Total length:			1:17:18

All lyrics are written by Stephen Schwartz; all music is composed by Alan Menken.

Disc 2
No.	Title	Performer(s)	Length
1.	"Emergence"		2:12
2.	"The Bells of Notre Dame (Reprise)"	Paul Kandel and Chorus	1:09
3.	"Someday"	All-4-One	4:18
4.	"God Help the Outcasts"	Bette Midler	3:30
5.	"The Bells of Notre Dame (Demo)"	Alan Menken and Stephen Schwartz	7:19
6.	"Die Glocken Notre Dames (Note: From the Musical "Der Glöckner von Notre Dame".)"	Jens Janke, Norbert Lamla, Carlo Lauber and Chorus	6:03
7.	"Out There (Demo 1)"	Alan Menken and Stephen Schwartz	4:07
8.	"Out There (Demo 2)"	Alan Menken and Stephen Schwartz	4:14
9.	"Draussen"	Drew Sarich	2:37
10.	"Topsy Turvy (Demo 1)"	Alan Menken and Stephen Schwartz	6:03
11.	"Topsy Turvy (Demo 2)"	Alan Menken and Stephen Schwartz	5:11
12.	"God Help the Outcasts (Demo 1)"	Alan Menken and Stephen Schwartz	4:16
13.	"God Help the Outcasts (Demo 2)"	Heidi Mollenhauer	2:54
14.	"Someday (Demo)"	Alan Menken	3:11
15.	"Someday"	Heidi Mollenhauer	3:16
16.	"In a Place of Miracles (Synth Demo)"	Alan Menken, Heidi Mollenhauer and Stephen Schwartz	5:21
17.	"Hellfire (Demo)"	Alan Menken and Stephen Schwartz	3:30
18.	"Heaven's Light (Reprise - Demo)"	Alan Menken	1:28
19.	"A Guy Like You (1st Demo)"	Alan Menken	2:49
20.	"A Guy Like You (Full Demo)"	Alan Menken	4:06
Total length:			1:17:34

== Aladdin ==
The Legacy Collection: Aladdin

Box set by Various artists
- Released: September 9, 2022
- Recorded: 1991–1992
- Studios: Sony Scoring Stage, Culver City; Todd-AO Studios, Los Angeles; BMG Studios, New York Citywide
- Genres: Soundtrack; film score
- Length: 1:50:50
- Label: Walt Disney
- Producers: Alan Menken; Tim Rice; Walter Afanasieff

The Legacy Collection: Aladdin was released on September 9, 2022, to coincide with the film's 30th anniversary. The album features the original 1992 soundtrack from Aladdin, including a deleted song, extended score, and alternate score.

All music is composed by Alan Menken.

Disc 1
No.	Title	Lyrics	Performer(s)	Length
1.	"Arabian Nights"	Howard Ashman	Bruce Adler	1:19
2.	"Legend of the Lamp"		Robin Williams	1:25
3.	"On a Dark Night"			2:55
4.	"Diamond in the Rough"			1:01
5.	"One Jump Ahead"	Tim Rice	Brad Kane	2:23
6.	"Street Urchins"			1:52
7.	"One Jump Ahead (Reprise)"	Tim Rice	Brad Kane	1:01
8.	"Intro to Jasmine and Jafar"			3:52
9.	"Jasmine Runs Away"			0:45
10.	"Marketplace"			2:37
11.	"Alchemy"			0:52
12.	"Rooftop"			2:26
13.	"Aladdin and Jasmine Confront Jafar"			2:40
14.	"Dungeon"			2:09
15.	"The Cave of Wonders"			3:03
16.	"Search For the Lamp"			3:42
17.	"Confiding In Papa"			0:45
18.	"Intro to Genie"			1:56
19.	"Friend Like Me"	Howard Ashman	Robin Williams	2:26
20.	"Provisos and Quid Pro Quo"			1:11
21.	"Jafar and Iago Scheme"			2:08
22.	"To Be Free"			4:02
23.	"Jafar Finds a Solution"			1:25
24.	"Prince Ali"	Howard Ashman	Robin Williams	2:51
25.	"Journeyed From Afar"			0:45
26.	"Sultan's Magic Carpet Ride"			0:45
27.	"A Very Impressive Youth"			2:09
28.	"Ali Comes Courting"			2:59
29.	"A Whole New World"	Tim Rice	Brad Kane and Lea Salonga	2:40
Total length:				1:00:16

All music is composed by Alan Menken.

Disc 2
No.	Title	Lyrics	Performer(s)	Length
1.	"The Kiss"			1:51
2.	"Genie Rescues Aladdin"			2:05
3.	"Sultan Under a Spell"			1:20
4.	"Maniacal Jafar"			1:31
5.	"Aladdin's Word"			1:51
6.	"Iago Impersonates Jasmine"			0:40
7.	"Jafar's Hour"			2:39
8.	"Prince Ali (Reprise)"	Tim Rice	Jonathan Freeman	1:13
9.	"The Ends of the Earth"			1:36
10.	"Jafar in Charge"			2:31
11.	"The Battle"			3:39
12.	"Happy End in Agrabah"			4:17
13.	"Finale"			0:44
14.	"A Whole New World (Aladdin's Theme)"	Tim Rice	Peabo Bryson and Regina Belle	4:06
15.	"Why Me? (Outtake)"	Tim Rice	Jonathan Freeman	3:22
16.	"Marketplace (Alternate)"			2:29
17.	"Dungeon (Alternate)"			2:05
18.	"Intro to Carpet (Alternate)"			1:37
19.	"Search for the Lamp (Alternate)"			3:42
20.	"Jafar and Iago Scheme (Alternate)"			1:21
21.	"Make You a Star (Alternate)"			2:04
22.	"Happy End in Agrabah (Alternate)"			3:41
Total length:				50:33
