= Krazy Kirk and the Hillbillies =

Musical/variety group

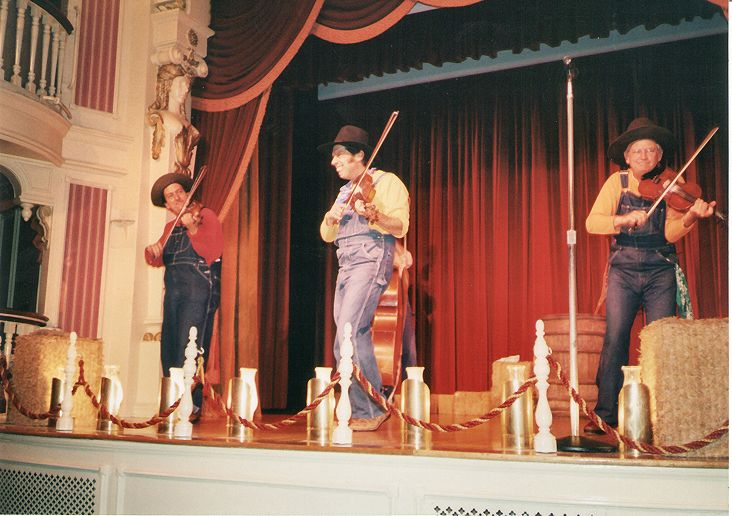
- Billy Hill and the Hillbillies at the Golden Horseshoe Saloon in Disneyland around 1999.

Background information
- Also known as: Krazy Kirk and the Hillbillies, Billy Hill and the Hillbillies, The Billys
- Origin: Anaheim, California
- Genres: Country, bluegrass, rock
- Years active: 1987–present
- Members: Kirk Wall; Eric Brenton; Rick Dunham; Anders Swanson; Brad Conyers
- Past members: John Marshall; Dennis Fetchet; Rick Storey; Duane Michaels; Mario Hidalgo; Evan Marshall; Arshag Chookoorian; John David; John Eaden
- Website: https://krazykirkandthehillbillies.org

Krazy Kirk and the Hillbillies is a musical/variety group that regularly performs at Knott's Berry Farm in Buena Park, California. Prior to 2014, they performed for 26+ years at Disneyland Park in Anaheim, California as Billy Hill and the Hillbillies. The group performs a bluegrass country music-centered show along with classic rock and rap (performed in a country and bluegrass style).

== History ==
The origin of the group dates back to the State Fair promotion at Disneyland in the fall of 1987. When Disneyland Entertainment talent booker Stan Freese was tasked with forming a musical group for the "Pigmania" pig races at Big Thunder Ranch, he wanted a comedy bluegrass band. Freese hired Kirk Wall as the frontman, as he had known Wall from Wall's time as a sub for Wally Boag in the Golden Horseshoe Revue.

"For Pigmania, I wanted someone who was a good musician and naturally funny," Freese said. "Kirk can play fiddle and guitar, but by his own admission, he’s not great at either one. However, Kirk is a very funny guy and can deliver a joke with expert timing."

The group, originally called the Pigmania Bluegrass Band, performed between the pig races and were a huge hit with the audience. State Fair returned the following year, but Freese knew that the band could be used elsewhere.

Meanwhile, Splash Mountain opened in the summer of 1989 and was a huge draw with huge lines. "Splash Mountain broke down a lot and the wait time stretched to hours on many days," Freese said. "I thought it would be a good idea to get a band over to the Splash Mountain queue area to entertain the crowd while they waited."

The Pigmania Band was renamed the Barley Boys and the band worked the Splash Mountain line that summer. Guests reacted positively to the band and Entertainment soon had the Barley Boys roaming all over Critter Country and became a regular atmosphere group.

The group had four original members:

- Kirk Wall—guitar and fiddle
- Mario Hildago—banjo
- Dennis Fetchet—fiddle
- John Marshall—bass

When the Golden Horseshoe Jamboree, the successor show to the Golden Horseshoe Revue, closed in the fall of 1994, the Barley Boys were given the stage in the Golden Horseshoe Saloon. Freese and the Entertainment team reworked the band into a show and renamed the group Billy Hill and the Hillbillies and the group made their debut on the stage on December 18. Mario Hildago was replaced before the opening by Evan Marshall (mandolin).

"With Kirk as the head 'Billy' and three other brothers named Billy, the band delighted audiences with their musical talent and uproarious comedy routines," Freese said.

Billy Hill and the Hillbillies play music from all genres in a folk/bluegrass style while interacting with audiences. The roster consists of a regular rotation of 10 to 12 musicians, with Kirk Wall generally serving as the lead singer while playing fiddle and guitar. Wall, who got his start in show business as a comedian, said he geared his jokes to adults in the crowd more than the children. "The kids might not get the jokes," Wall said, "but they at least get a kick out of seeing their mom and dad crack up." A lifelong fan of Elvis Presley, Wall would also integrate his talent as an Elvis impersonator into the act where appropriate—performing comedic country renditions of Elvis songs.

Wall noted that Disneyland did not prohibit him, or the band itself, from pursuing side projects. One such show took place in Buffalo, New York in 1997 as part of the Buffalo Philharmonic Orchestra's TGIF series. According to Mary Kunz of Buffalo News, the group performed classical pieces together with the orchestra which "proved how much bluegrass and classical music have in common". After intermission, the band re-emerged dressed in overalls, "like some kind of Appalachian Marx Brothers", and performed another hour of country standards including "Hey Good Lookin'", "Tennessee Waltz", and "Orange Blossom Special".

Prior to February 3, 2009, Billy Hill and the Hillbillies were performing seven days a week inside the Golden Horseshoe as three different casts:

Blue Team
(Sunday, Monday)
- Rick Storey, banjo and guitar
- Kirk Wall, guitar and fiddle
- Anders Swanson, bass and fiddle
- Dennis Fetchet, fiddle and mandolin
Gold Team
(Saturday, Tuesday, Wednesday)
- Duane Michaels, mandolin and fiddle
- Kirk Wall
- Dennis Fetchet
- John Marshall, bass
Green Team
(Thursday, Friday)
- John David, guitar and banjo
- John Marshall
- Duane Michaels
- John Eaden, lead and guitar

In 1999, the Billys were moved out of the Golden Horseshoe to Big Thunder Barbecue to make way for a temporary stage show called The All-New Woody's Roundup, to coincide with the release of the Pixar film, Toy Story 2. The group returned to the Horseshoe after the Woody show closed in June 2000.

The Billys were moved out to Big Thunder Ranch again on June 18, 2012—this time on the stage of the Big Thunder Ranch Jamboree area. On November 6, 2013, Disneyland announced that Billy Hill and the Hillbillies would be retired as of January 6, 2014—ending a run of 21 consecutive years performing in Frontierland. A group called "Save The Billys" started a petition and Facebook event in an attempt to persuade Disney to change its mind on retiring the group.

With their release from Disneyland inevitable, in late 2013, the "Blue Team" of Billys (Kirk Wall, Anders Swanson, Dennis Fetchet, and Rick Storey) started their own group named Krazy Kirk and the Hillbillies. The show has the same music, comedy style, but they were now performing outside of Disneyland in both public and private events. The first performance for this group was on New Year's Eve 2013 at Knott's Berry Farm.

Knott's eventually made Krazy Kirk and the Hillbillies part of the park's entertainment lineup. The band now performs in the Wagon Camp on most weekends. The current team includes Kirk Wall, Eric Brenton, Rick Dunham, Anders Swanson, and Brad Conyers.

== Performance locations ==
- Big Thunder Ranch, Disneyland (1987–1988)
- Critter Country, Disneyland (1989–1994)
- Golden Horseshoe Saloon, Disneyland (1994–1999)
- Big Thunder Ranch, Disneyland (1999–2000)
- Golden Horseshoe Saloon, Disneyland (2000–2012)
- Big Thunder Ranch, Disneyland (2012–2014)
- Birdcage Theater, Knott's Berry Farm (2014–2019)
- Wagon Camp, Knott's Berry Farm (2019–present)
