= Golden Horseshoe (disambiguation) =

The Golden Horseshoe is a densely populated and industrialized region centred on the west end of Lake Ontario in Southern Ontario, Canada.

Golden Horseshoe may also refer to:

- Knights of the Golden Horseshoe Expedition, an expedition led by Governor Alexander Spotswood where after the journey, he gave each of his men a golden horseshoe
- Golden Horseshoe Saloon, a theater located at Disneyland in Anaheim, California
- Battle for the Golden Horseshoe, an annual rivalry college football game between the UC Davis Aggies and the Cal Poly Mustangs
- The Golden Horseshoe, 1955 book by Elizabeth Coatsworth, illustrated by Robert Lawson
