= Big Thunder Ranch =

Former attraction at Disneyland

Coordinates: 33.8143°N 117.9204°W

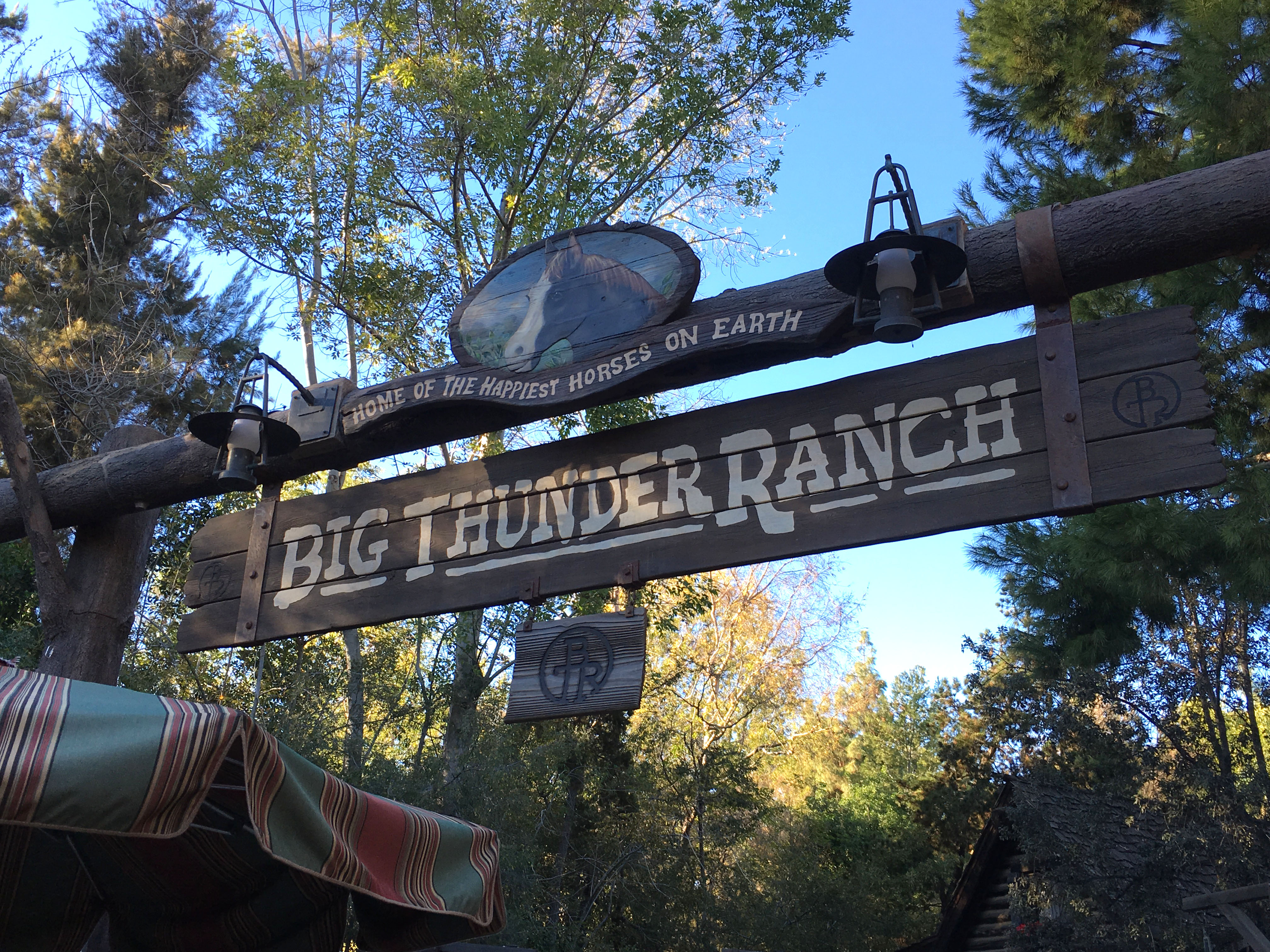

Disneyland
- Area: Frontierland
- Status: Removed
- Opening date: June 22, 1986
- Closing date: January 11, 2016
- Replaced by: Star Wars: Galaxy's Edge

Ride statistics
- Attraction type: Petting zoo

Big Thunder Ranch was an attraction at Disneyland Park in Anaheim, California, United States. It included an outdoor petting zoo, a walk-through log cabin, and a variety of scenery meant to create the atmosphere of a Western ranch. It was located in Frontierland, nearby Big Thunder Mountain Railroad. Inside one could find sheep, goats, cows, and other farm animals. Among these animals were the two turkeys who received presidential pardons in honor of Thanksgiving in 2008. The attraction was hosted by Brawny.

Big Thunder Ranch closed permanently on January 11, 2016, as the attraction (and some nearby backstage areas) became the site of the 14-acre (5.7 ha) land, Star Wars: Galaxy's Edge.

== History ==
The idea for Big Thunder Ranch was originally conceived in 1984 by Dan Stark, who at that time was the Area Supervisor/Department Manager for the Circle D, the backstage area where the park's horses were housed. He thought that it would be a plus to use the open space where the old Mine Train Through Nature's Wonderland and the Pack Mules trekked was left vacant after Big Thunder Mountain Railroad opened. There was a need for some additional paddock space to rest horses. So, one of the considerations was that the horses could also be seen from the Disneyland Railroad which made for a good show component The other consideration was accessibility to that area as the old trail that the Pack Mules used to get up and over the railroad tracks safely for the animals and staff was still in good shape and it was adjacent to the area open space. After some early conversations with Kim Irvine, the onsite Walt Disney Imagineering manager, and a mention about this idea when the new company CEO & COO, Michael Eisner and Frank Wells, were spending two days visiting all areas of the park, the project was given a provisional go-ahead. Subsequently, architect Chris Carradine was tasked by Walt Disney Imagineering to develop the initial attraction plans.

The attraction opened in 1986. It housed the Big Thunder log cabin, a building constructed with real logs provided by the Rocky Mountain Log Company. The cabin was initially intended as a replica to simply be looked at by visitors, but it was later used as a gift store and finally as a children's crafts center. Walt Disney Imagineering designed the building, and building designer Bob Ybarra drew the plans. Care was taken to use real materials and hide modern structural hardware to make the cabin look as authentic as possible.

The cabin was accompanied by a petting zoo and a dining area known as the Big Thunder Barbecue.

Eventually, the petting zoo was removed to make room for an outdoor theater that served as a home for a live show themed to Disney Animation's 1996 film Hunchback of Notre Dame titled Festival of Fools beginning in June 1996. The show ended in April 1998.

The Ranch hosted the Billy Hill and the Hillbillies show after they left the Golden Horseshoe Saloon until they left Disneyland on January 6, 2014, and moved to Knott's Berry Farm. After being used on occasion for special events and seasonal attractions for several years, the outdoor dining area reopened in spring 2009, serving seasonal confections and an all-you-can-eat American-style barbecue menu, including chicken, pork, sausage, beans, corncob, cornbread, coleslaw, lemonade and fruit cobbler. Musicians performed traditional American country and folklore sing-along on the stage and interacted with diners.

The log cabin was called "Miss Chris' Cabin" and had two large tables stocked with baskets of crayons and coloring pages.

In an area unseen by guests inside the Ranch premises existed a hidden trail lined with path lights and towering trees used for access of the horses seen around the park, from the backstage stables to the on stage areas. At the other end of the trail was the only actual house built on the resort that was occupied by the caretakers of the Equestrians.

=== Decorations ===
The entire ranch rotated through seasonal-appropriate decorations:

- Summertime Roundup decorations featured summer flowers, eagles, and red/white/blue color motifs.
- Autumntime Roundup decorations featured fall flowers, carved pumpkins, and orange/brown/yellow color motifs.
- Wintertime Roundup decorations featured winter flowers, snow, and red/green/blue color motifs.
- Springtime Roundup decorations featured spring flowers, baby animals, and purple/yellow/green color motifs.

Big Thunder Ranch often hosted seasonal and holiday-themed shows, including Woody's All-American Roundup during Fourth of July events, Woody's Halloween Roundup during Halloween events, and Santa's Reindeer Roundup during Christmas events.

=== Special attraction ===
There was a holstein cow born in Maine in 1982. She had a large Mickey Mouse head image on her side in the form of three circles. Disneyland found out about her, adopted the bovine, named her Mickey Moo, and moved her to Big Thunder Ranch in 1988. While living in the park, she bore a calf who was named Baby Moo. Mickey Moo died at the age of 11 in 1993. There was a Hidden Mickey on the sliding door to Clarabelle's Frozen Yogurt (1993–2022) in Mickey's Toontown that was put there in memory of her. A tribute to her can also be found in Clarabelle's Hand Scooped Ice Cream at Disney California Adventure on the shelves above the waffle ice cream bowls. There are old-fashioned milk bottles with the Clarabelle’s Hand Scooped Ice Cream shop logo on them and an image of Mickey Moo.
