= Dennis Fetchet =

American musician

Dennis Fetchet, a Southern California bluegrass musician who plays fiddle & mandolin and sings baritone, tenor, and lead. He's played with the Grateful Dudes Bluegrass Band, was formerly with Disneyland's Billy Hill and the Hillbillies, and formally with Krazy Kirk and the Hillbillies band at Knott's Berry Farm. He is also accomplished on the guitar, and blues harp.

Dennis has played all over the world with country music superstar Hoyt Axton. He was a member of Hoyt Axton's band from 1978 until Hoyt's retirement from performing in 1987. Dennis has also been a member of Bluegrass Cardinals, the LA Fiddle Band, The Wild Hickory Nuts, and the Southland Bluegrass Band.

From 1992 until 2019, Dennis was a member of Billy Hill and the Hillbillies and worked at Knott's Berry Farm as "Dynamite Denny" in the Krazy Kirk and the Hillbillies show at the Bird Cage Theatre and Wagon Camp Arena in Ghost Town. While he was at Disneyland, he demonstrated "speed fiddling" five times daily (Wednesdays – Sundays) with his specialty "The Orange Blossom", and also showed off his talents for comedy, guitar, mandolin, blues harp, and other assorted instruments.

Dennis is currently retired and living in the Southern California area, occasionally playing in local bluegrass bands as a guest.

== Album credits ==
- 15th Annual Topanga Banjo and Fiddle Contest – featuring various artists – 1975 – on fiddle playing the "Cotton Patch Rag", and "Black Mountain".
- Bluegrass Cardinals – Bluegrass Cardinals – 1976 – on fiddle – playing on all tracks.
- Rusty Old Halo – Hoyt Axton – 1979 – on fiddle and harmonica – playing on all tracks.
- Where Did the Money Go? – Hoyt Axton – 1980 – on fiddle and harmonica – playing on all tracks.
- Hoyt Axton Live – Hoyt Axton – 1981 – on fiddle and harmonica – featured as a solo on "Orange Blossom Special" and "Roanoake".
- Pistol Packin’ Mama – Hoyt Axton – 1981 – on fiddle and harmonica on all tracks.
- Lonesome Feeling – Herb Pedersen – 1984 – on fiddle
- Plunge – Michael Stearns – 1986 – on fiddle
- Polka Party! – "Weird Al" Yankovic – 1986 – on fiddle for “Good Enough For Now” track.
- Collected Thematic Works – Michael Stearns – 1987 – on fiddle
- Songs of the Working People – featuring various artists – 1988 – on fiddle – on "Flying Fish" track.
- Now They Are Four – Byron Berline – 1989 – on fiddle – on "Santa Ana" track
- Back to the Future – featuring various artists – 1990 – on fiddle – ZZ Top song used in old west scene.
- California Traveler – California Traveler – 1992 – on fiddle
- Billy Hill and the Hillbillies – Billy Hill and the Hillbillies – 1996 – on fiddle, electric guitar, and harmonica – on all tracks.
- What's Left? – The Foremen – 1996 – on fiddle
- Highway to Here – Sharon Cort – 1997 – on fiddle
- Landscapes – Joyce Woodson – 1998 – on fiddle
- Pistol Packin' Mama/Spin of the Wheel Re-release – Hoyt Axton – 1998 – on fiddle and Lap Steel Guitar.
- Rusty Old Halo/Where Did the Money Go Re-release – Hoyt Axton – 1998 – on fiddle and mandolin.
- Private Edition – Bobby Cochran – 1999 – on Fiddle.
- Pickin' on Jerry Garcia – featuring Various Artists – 2001 – on Fiddle – on "Gomorrah" and "Rhapsody in Red" tracks.
- None of Your Business – The Big Shots – released between 1997 and 2000 – on fiddle – on "Stop It" track.
- I Want U 2 Want Me – The Billys – 2002 – on fiddle, vocals and mandolin – on all tracks.
- The Billys Live – The Billys – 2006 – on fiddle, vocals and mandolin – on all tracks.

== Film credit ==
- Heart Like a Wheel – Dennis Fetchet 1983 plays fiddle player in Tex's band.
