= Fulton Burley =

Irish-Canadian performer

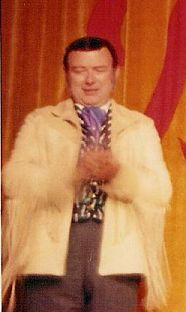
- Fulton Burley on the stage of the Golden Horseshoe Revue in the early 1970s.
- Born: Fulton Burley; June 12, 1922; Toronto, Ontario, Canada
- Died: May 7, 2007 (aged 84); Carlsbad, California, U.S.
- Occupation: Actor
- Years active: 1930–1997
- Spouse: Terry Burley

Fulton Burley (June 12, 1922 – May 7, 2007) was a Canadian performer, most widely known for his work in Disneyland. Born in Toronto, Ontario, and raised in Windsor, Ontario, Canada, Fulton came to the United States in 1943 after a telephone audition landed him the singing lead in Billy Rose's Diamond Horseshoe Revue on Broadway. He later marveled at his "Irish" luck saying, "The peculiar thing is I was at the Golden Horseshoe for 25 years, and I had started [my professional career] at the Diamond Horseshoe."

At age 7, he performed in church weddings, and by 14, on radio in Windsor, where he worked three mornings a week before school. He, also, went on to sing with the Windsor Symphony Orchestra.

Fulton attended J. C. Patterson Collegiate Institute in Windsor, followed by Wayne State University in Detroit, where he studied law with a minor in music. Ultimately, he dropped his law studies to pursue a career in entertainment and eventually won a contract with Metro-Goldwyn-Mayer (MGM), where he appeared as a supporting actor in films such as "Without Love" with Spencer Tracy and Katharine Hepburn and "Homecoming" with Clark Gable and Lana Turner.

During World War II, he served as a member of the 40th Special Services Division, under the command of actor Melvyn Douglas, traveling to China, Burma and India. After the War, Fulton spent several years touring the United States with a number of musical productions, during which he developed his keen instinct for light comedy and a legendary repertoire of jokes.

In 1962, he was playing at the Hacienda Hotel in Las Vegas when he received a call from his pal Wally Boag, with whom he had worked as a contract player at MGM. Wally, who had been performing in the Golden Horseshoe Revue for seven years, explained that one of his fellow cast members had become seriously ill and urged Fulton to take over the role. Fulton did, and subsequently, lit up the stage with his jovial nature and lilting brogue.

In the Enchanted Tiki Room, Fulton can be heard as the voice of the Irish parrot, Michael. Later, he entertained Disney fans across the country, when he traveled on special tours promoting such films as the animated classic Cinderella, which was re-released on the big screen in 1981. After a quarter-of-a century with The Walt Disney Company, Fulton retired from the Golden Horseshoe Revue in 1987.

In 1995, he was honored as a Disney Legend for his work at Disneyland Attractions.

In 1997, reprised his role for The Enchanted Tiki Room (Under New Management) at Magic Kingdom along with Wally Boag and Thurl Ravenscroft.

Burley died from heart failure on May 7, 2007, at Sunrise Assisted Living at La Costa in Carlsbad, California. He was 84.
