= List of Jiminy Cricket educational serials =

This is a list of all four Jiminy Cricket educational series that originally aired on The Mickey Mouse Club TV series. Each series features Jiminy Cricket, Pinocchio's conscience, providing general education and science information in an entertaining and accessible manner. The series also have a strong focus on the importance of books and learning on one's own. The I'm No Fool and You series were later updated in the 1980s and 1990s as stand-alone shorts, and were shown in schools and occasionally on the Disney Channel.

== I'm No Fool series ==
Each short is less than 10 minutes in runtime and begins and ends with the theme song, "I'm No Fool", with the lyrics to the closing number reworked to include the lessons taught during the short. Jiminy presents each hypothetical situation by drawing chalk outlines of the primary participants on a black board. The drawings then come to life and get into various questionable situations, with Jiminy steering them in the right direction.

=== Filmography ===
- I'm No Fool with a Bicycle (10/06/1955)*
- I'm No Fool with Fire (12/01/1955)*
- I'm No Fool as a Pedestrian (10/8/1956)*
- I'm No Fool in Water (11/15/1956)*
- I'm No Fool Having Fun (12/15/1956)
- I'm No Fool with Electricity (10/26/1973)*

(*) = Updated in the mid through late 1980s with additional live-action footage

== You and Your series ==
Similarly to the I'm No Fool series above, Jiminy Cricket teaches children about the human body.

=== Filmography ===
- You - the Human Animal (10/20/1955)
- You - and Your Five Senses (12/15/1955)*
- You - and Your Eyes (11/07/1956)*
- You - and Your Senses of Smell and Taste (12/05/1956)
- You - and Your Food (4/18/1957)
- You - the Living Machine (5/01/1957)
- You - and Your Ears (10/03/1957)
- You - and Your Sense of Touch (1964)*

(*) = Updated in the mid through late 1980s with additional live-action footage

== Nature of Things series ==
Jiminy Cricket teaches children about the animals of nature, in a similar manner to the I'm No Fool series. This series also had live-action footage lifted from True-Life Adventures, and was also known as Animal Autobiography. Generally these had only intro sequence featuring Jiminy Cricket, while the rest was live-action of real animals.

=== Filmography ===
- Animal Champions (10/13/1955)
- Cansdale (10/27/1955)
- The Elephant (11/17/1955)
- The Camel (1/26/1956)
- The Beaver (10/23/1956)
- The Horse (11/23/1956)

== Encyclopedia series ==
Jiminy Cricket teaches children how to spell, also in a similar manner to the I'm No Fool series. The series had a catchy theme song from which many children learned to spell "encyclopedia", most likely inspired by Paul Whiteman's novelty hit, "C-O-N-S-T-A-N-T-I-N-O-P-L-E" (both songs even had the same tempo and meter). At least five or six shorts aired under the Encyclopedia's banner featured Jiminy Cricket. Additionally further nine Mickey Mouse Club Newsreel Specials were aired under the Encyclopedia banner but didn't feature Jiminy Cricket.

=== Filmography ===
- Curiosity (1956)
- Cork and Wheelwright (11/01/1956)
- Milk (11/26/1956)
- Tuna (12/27/1956)
- Railroads (2/19/1957)
- Steel (4/26/1957)

== Educational film ==
In 1984, Disney Educational Productions released a film called Jiminy Cricket, P.S. (Problem Solver) which recycles animation from other Disney shorts. The film was 10 minutes long, and also stars Goofy, Donald Duck, and Ludwig Von Drake. It was originally released on VHS.
