= Betty Taylor (actress) =

American actress and performer (1919–2011)

- Born: 7 October 1919; Seattle, Washington, U.S.
- Died: 4 June 2011 (aged 91); Coupeville, Washington, U.S.
- Occupations: Actress, performer
- Years active: 1934–1998

Betty Taylor (October 7, 1919 – June 4, 2011) was an American actress and performer, best known as "Slue Foot Sue" in Disneyland's Golden Horseshoe Revue, opposite Wally Boag.

Taylor died on June 4, 2011, at the age of 91, the day after Boag died.
