= Wally Boag =

American performer (1920–2011)

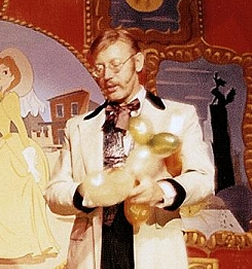
- Wally Boag constructing one of his signature "Boagaloons" at the Golden Horseshoe Revue in the early 1970s.
- Born: Wallace Vincent Boag; September 13, 1920; Portland, Oregon, U.S.
- Died: June 3, 2011 (aged 90); Santa Monica, California, U.S.
- Occupations: Actor, comedian
- Years active: 1945–1982
- Spouse: Frances Ellen Morgan (m. 1943)
- Children: 2

An advertisement from Wally Boag's pre-Disney days.

Wallace Vincent Boag (September 13, 1920 – June 3, 2011) was an American performer known for his starring role in Disney's long-running stage show the Golden Horseshoe Revue and as the voice of Jose the parrot in Walt Disney's Enchanted Tiki Room.

== Biography ==
Boag was born in Portland, Oregon, in 1920 to Evelyn G. and Wallace B. Boag. He joined a professional dance team at age nine, later established his own dance school, and by the age of 19 had turned to comedy. He toured the world's stages in hotels, theaters and nightclubs. While appearing at the London Hippodrome in Starlight Roof, he brought a young 12-year-old girl on stage to help with his balloon act. The girl, a young Julie Andrews, astonished the audience with her voice and was kept in the show. In 1945, Boag signed a contract with Metro-Goldwyn-Mayer and appeared in films such as Without Love and Thrill of a Romance, in credited roles.

In the early 1950s, while appearing in revues in Australia, he met tenor Donald Novis. It was Novis who got Walt Disney to audition Boag for the Golden Horseshoe Revue, a 45-minute stage show which was written by its first pianist Charles LaVere and lyricist Tom Adair. Novis was the show's first tenor and was replaced by Fulton Burley when he retired in 1962. Both Boag and The Golden Horseshoe Revue were cited in The Guinness Book of World Records for having the greatest number of performances of any theatrical presentation. The 10,000th performance of the Golden Horseshoe Revue was featured on NBC's The Wonderful World of Disney.

Boag's Pecos Bill/Traveling Salesman character was a fast-paced comedy routine featuring slapstick humor, squirt guns, a seemingly endless supply of broken teeth which he would spit out throughout the routine, and his signature balloon animals which he called Boagaloons.

In 1963, Julie Andrews once again performed with Boag on the Golden Horseshoe stage along with the Dapper Dans, at a special press-only event to promote the following year's release of Mary Poppins. Together, Andrews and Boag recreated their act of long ago and sang "By the Light of the Silvery Moon."

While Walt Disney was alive, he did everything he could to further Boag's career. Boag voiced Jose in "Walt Disney's Enchanted Tiki Room" and also wrote much of the script for the attraction, participating also in the development of "Haunted Mansion" in Disneyland.

Disney had small roles written for Boag in The Absent-Minded Professor and Son of Flubber. It was Disney's plan to use Boag as the voice of Tigger in Winnie the Pooh. While at a story meeting for Winnie the Pooh and the Blustery Day, Disney felt that Wally Boag was perfect for the role of Tigger. Disney died from lung cancer in December 1966 before Boag auditioned for Tigger. But in 1968, director Wolfgang Reitherman and other studio executives decided that Boag's high-energy stage performance was "too zany" for the film, and instead, the role went to Paul Winchell. Except for a cameo appearance in The Love Bug, Boag did not appear in any more Disney films.

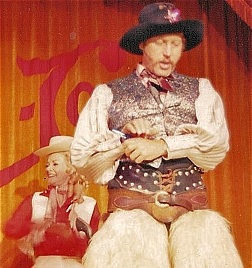
Wally Boag as "Pecos Bill" at the Golden Horseshoe Revue in the early 1970s. Betty Taylor as "Slue Foot Sue" in the background.

In 1971, Boag took his Pecos Bill character to the newly opened Walt Disney World and re-crafted the saloon show into a faster, funnier Diamond Horseshoe Revue. Three years later he returned to Disneyland and finished his career there, entertaining adoring crowds at the Golden Horseshoe, retiring in 1982. (He had in the meantime performed his act as the human guest on the fifth season of The Muppet Show.) The Golden Horseshoe Revue closed in 1986. In 1995, Boag was inducted into the ranks of the Disney Legends and has his own window on Main Street in Disneyland above the Carnation Company. The inscription reads "Theatrical Agency - Golden Vaudeville Routines - Wally Boag, Prop."

Boag lived in California with his wife, Ellen Morgan Boag. He died on June 3, 2011, in Santa Monica, California from Alzheimer's disease.

== Legacy ==
His autobiography, entitled Wally Boag, Clown Prince of Disneyland, was published in August 2009.

Boag's performances have influenced many later performers and comedians, most notable of whom is Steve Martin, who studied Boag's humor and timing while working at Disneyland as a teenager. Boag's performance appears on Week One of the Mickey Mouse Club DVD collection, and the soundtrack of the Golden Horseshoe Revue has been released on CD.

On June 3, 2011, it was announced by Steve Martin on Twitter "My hero, the first comedian I ever saw live, my influence, a man to whom I aspired, has passed on. Wally Boag." The following day, June 4, 2011, Boag's longtime partner at the Golden Horseshoe Revue, Betty Taylor, also died. Boag's wife Ellen died in July 2014.

== Filmography ==
| Year | Title | Role | Notes |
|---|---|---|---|
| 1945 | Without Love | Soldier | Uncredited |
| 1945 | Thrill of a Romance | Canadian Flier | Uncredited |
| 1947 | The Borden Show | | TV series, 1 episode |
| 1949-1961 | Toast of the Town | Himself / Comedian | 2 episodes |
| 1955 | The Mickey Mouse Club | Himself | Uncredited, 1 episode |
| 1961 | The Absent-Minded Professor | T.V. Newsman | |
| 1963 | Son of Flubber | George, Father in Commercial | |
| 1968 | The Love Bug | Flabbergasted Driver | (final film role) |
| 1969 | The Good Old Days | Himself - Performer | 1 episode |
| 1981 | The Muppet Show | Himself - Special Guest Star | 1 episode |
| 2011 | Gnomeo & Juliet | | using archival sound of Boag as José in Walt Disney's Enchanted Tiki Room |
