= Donald Novis =

English-born American actor and tenor

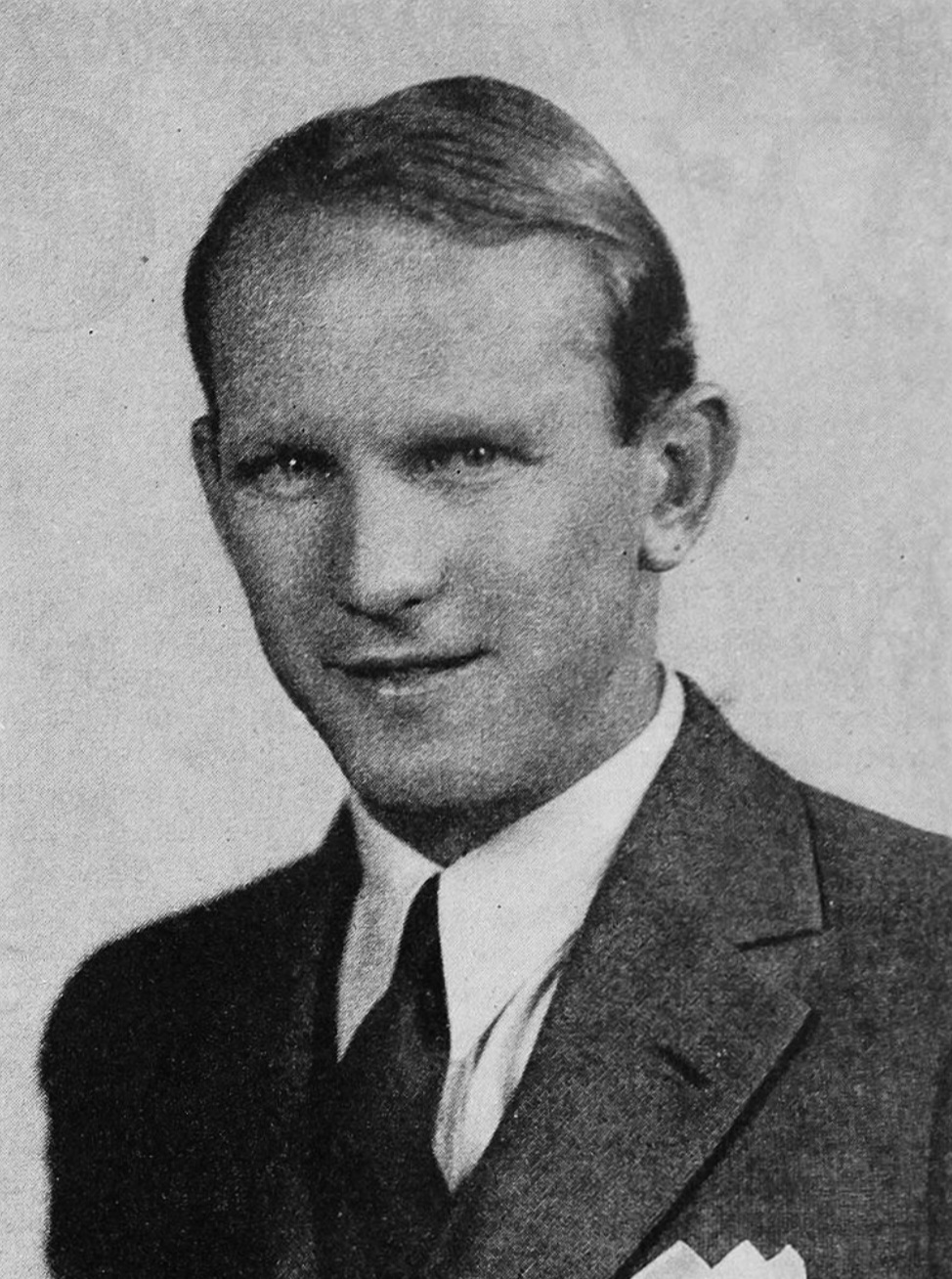
- Donald Novis in December 1932
- Born: Donald George Novis; March 3, 1906; Hastings, Sussex
- Died: July 23, 1966 (aged 60); Norwalk, California
- Occupations: Actor and singer
- Years active: 1929–1964
- Spouses: Emma Julietta Burnett (m. 1929; div. ?); Dorothy Bradshaw (m. 1938–66; his death)
- Children: Carol Jean Novis; Leslie Katherine Novis

Donald Novis sings "Love, Here Is My Heart" (1933)

Donald George Novis (3 March 1906 – 23 July 1966) was an English-born American actor and tenor.

== Early life ==
Novis was born on 3 March 1906 in Hastings, Sussex to Frederick George Novis and Charlotte Morris. Shortly after his birth, Novis and his family emigrated to Canada, where they eventually settled in Chapleau, Ontario. On 8 November 1908, the family entered the United States through Detroit on their way to Los Angeles.

Novis was educated at Thomas Jefferson Elementary School, Pasadena High School and Whittier College. He was a soloist in two churches, and he sang on radio station KPSN.

== Atwater Kent contest ==
In 1928, Novis won the national Atwater Kent Foundation singing competition after having won a preliminary regional contest that included contestants from nine western states. The victory in the second national Radio Audition earned $5,000 cash and a two-year university scholarship for Novis.

== Career ==
Novis pursued an acting and singing career. He made his film debut as the Country Boy in the detective film Bulldog Drummond (1929). He appeared on screen in numerous films up to 1937, often as a singer in films like One Hour with You (1932) and This Is the Night (1932). His appearances in films were thereafter limited. He sang on several film soundtracks and notably recorded the Academy Award-nominated song "Love Is a Song" for the Disney animated feature film Bambi (1942). He and Gloria Grafton introduced the popular song "My Romance" in the Broadway show Jumbo (1935).

In 1930, Novis made his Broadway debut as Hoheno in the original production of Rudolf Friml's Luana. He performed in only one other Broadway musical during his career, Matt Mulligan, Jr. in Richard Rodgers and Lorenz Hart's Jumbo in 1935-1936. In 1938 he starred in a production of Jerome Kern's Roberta at the Los Angeles Civic Light Opera.

Novis was also highly active as a singer with big bands and as a radio entertainer in the 1930s, including having his own program on NBC beginning on 15 June 1932. Beginning on January 4, 1933, he and Morton Downey co-starred in a weekly program on NBC Radio. The Wednesday night Woodbury programs had Leon Belasco's orchestra providing accompaniment. He performed frequently with Anson Weeks and his band and was often heard on the radio programme Fibber McGee and Molly. He also played Matt Mulligan in the old-time radio adaptation of Jumbo (1935-1936) on NBC. From 1932–1934 he led his own orchestra which made several recordings for Brunswick Records.

In 1955 Novis co-created the script for the long-running “Golden Horseshoe Revue” at Disneyland’s Frontierland with Wally Boag. The show ran continuously to 1986, and Novis himself starred in the production from its inception until his retirement 9 years later in 1964.

== Personal life ==
On 4 November 1929, (Note: Novis's Associated Press obituary says, "He married his first wife ... in 1931 ...") Novis married his first wife, soprano Emma Julietta Burnett, at Long Beach, California. Four years later, they were divorced.

In February 1938, Novis married his second wife, Dorothy Bradshaw, a former Ziegfeld girl, at the Sky Harbor Airport in Phoenix, Arizona. By his second wife, Novis had two daughters, Carol Jean and Leslie Katherine Novis. He died in Norwalk, California on 23 July 1966.

== Death ==
Novis died of pneumonia in Costa Mesa, California in 1966 at the age of 60. He was survived by his wife, two daughters, two brothers, and a sister.

== Selected filmography ==
- Bulldog Drummond (1929)
- Kathleen Mavourneen (1930)
- Love In The Rough (1930)
- Monte Carlo (1930)
- One Hour With You (1932)
- The Singing Plumber (1932)
- The Big Broadcast (1932)
- We Do Our Part (1935)
- Cut Out For Love (1937)
- Bambi (1942) Only voice
- Sweethearts of the U.S.A. (1944)
- Lady And The Tramp (1955) Only Voice
