= Golden Horseshoe Saloon =

Attraction at Disneyland in California

Coordinates: 33.812°N 117.9202°W

The Golden Horseshoe Saloon
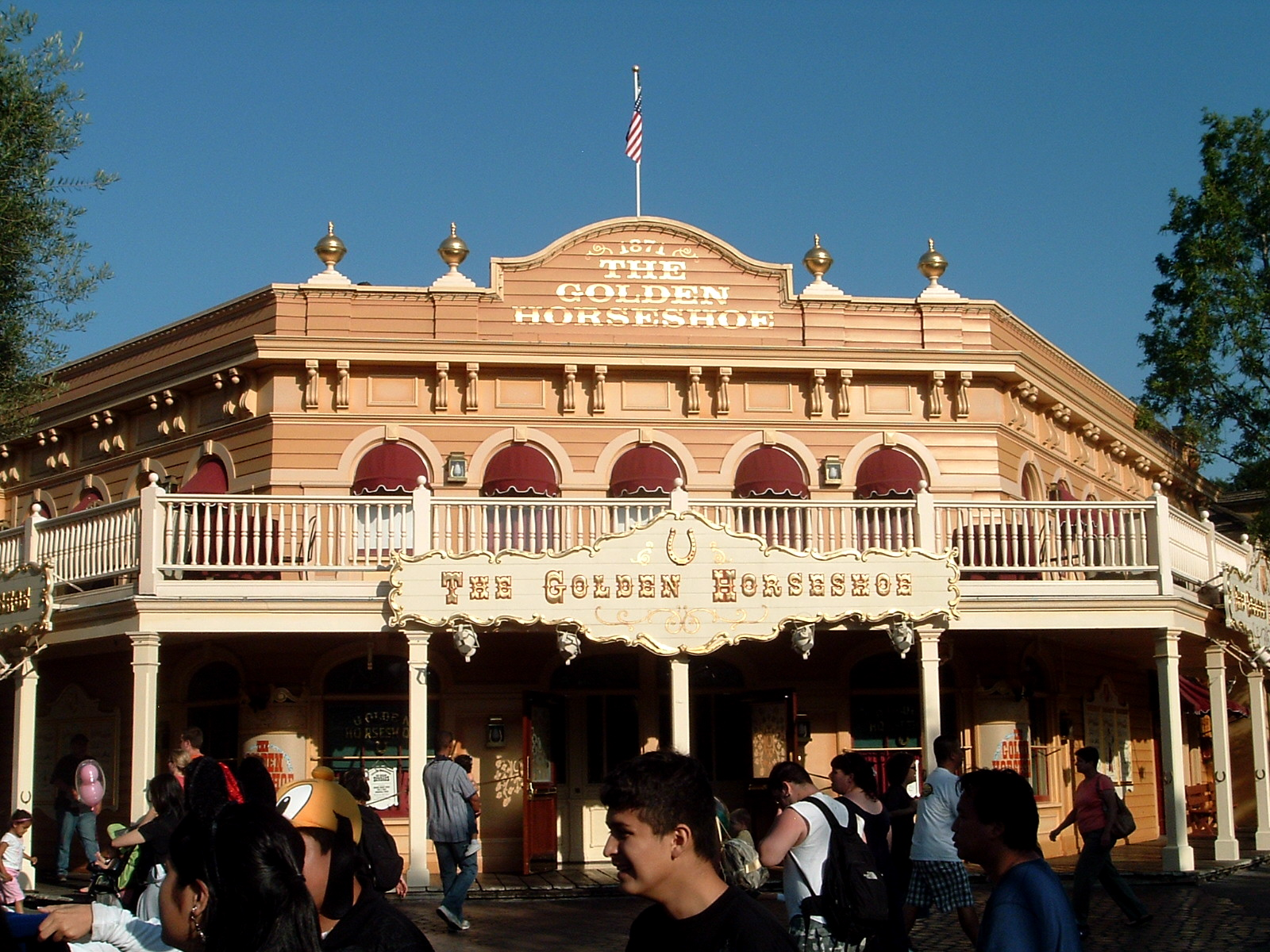

Disneyland
- Area: Frontierland
- Status: Operating
- Soft opening date: July 13, 1955
- Opening date: July 17, 1955

Ride statistics
- Theme: Western saloon

The Golden Horseshoe Saloon (referred to as Pecos Bill's Golden Horseshoe Saloon during construction) is a restaurant and attraction at Disneyland Park in Anaheim, California in the United States. It opened in 1955 with several other original attractions at Disneyland Park. Over the years the venue has housed multiple stage shows. The "saloon" is located in Frontierland and has views of the Rivers of America and New Orleans Square.

== History ==
The Golden Horseshoe Stage unofficially opened on July 13, 1955, as the Golden Horseshoe Saloon, when Walt and Lillian Disney, along with dozens of guests, celebrated their 30th anniversary with a private party and the premiere showing of the original Golden Horseshoe Revue.

On Saturday, July 16, 1955, the Golden Horseshoe opened a day early for a private party of corporate sponsors. This show marked Wally Boag's first official performance as Pecos Bill/Traveling Salesman at the Golden Horseshoe Saloon.

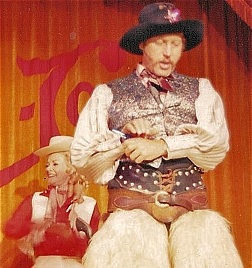
Wally Boag performing as Pecos Bill at the Golden Horseshoe, in the 1970s

The first show to open on the stage was Slue Foot Sue's Golden Horseshoe Revue (mistakenly spelled "Review") on July 17, 1955. The revue's music was written by Charles LaVere, who served as the show's pianist, and used lyrics by Tom Adair. The script for the production was co-authored by two of its stars, Donald Novis and Wally Boag. This variety show ran a record 39,000 times and is listed in the Guinness Book of Records as the longest-running musical of all time. One of the features of the show was to have children from the audience sing and dance on stage. "Davy Crockett" was a favorite song performed by the guests.

In 1962, Ron Miller, son-in-law to Walt Disney, directed a made-for-television movie by the same title. The film starred Disney actress Annette Funicello, Ed Wynn, Betty Taylor, Gene Sheldon, Wally Boag and Walt Disney.

== Productions ==
=== Golden Horseshoe Revue ===
The Golden Horseshoe Revue was the original and longest running show at the saloon, playing from July 17, 1955, until October 12, 1986. Over the years it starred Wally Boag, Betty Taylor, Don Novis, Fulton Burley, Dick Hardwick, Frankie Wylie, Jack Watson, Judy Marsh, Burt Henry, Dana Daniels, Jay Meyer, Kirk Wall, Jimmy Adams, Don Payne, Ron Schneider and many others.

The stage show featured saloon owner Slue Foot Sue and her dance hall girls who welcomed the audience with "Hello Everybody", followed by a flirtatious interactive song like "A Lady Has to Mind Her P's and Q's" or "Riverboat Blues". The show's MC introduced various skits featuring a traveling salesman, played by Wally Boag, and later Dick Hardwick.

The show would be interrupted by Pecos Bill, who would sing his self-titled signature song.

=== Golden Horseshoe Jamboree Show ===
This show ran from November 1, 1986, until December 18, 1994.

=== Billy Hill and the Hillbillies ===
This show featuring bluegrass and comedy began its run in the Golden Horseshoe Saloon on December 22, 1994, and ended on June 15, 2012, when it was moved to the Big Thunder Ranch stage, closing there on January 6, 2014. Over the years it starred Kirk Wall, Dennis Fetchet, John Marshall, Evan Marshall, John Eaden, Duane Michaels, Rick Storey, Anders Swanson, and many others.

=== Golden Horseshoe Variety Show ===
This show ran two days a week from June 13, 1995, until October 8, 2003, and featured the comedy and magic talents of Dana Daniels, who was mentored by Wally Boag.

=== Woody's Round-up ===
This child-friendly show ran from November 21, 1999, until July 17, 2000, and featured characters from the Disney/Pixar movie Toy Story 2.

=== Frontierland: The Little Town That Could ===
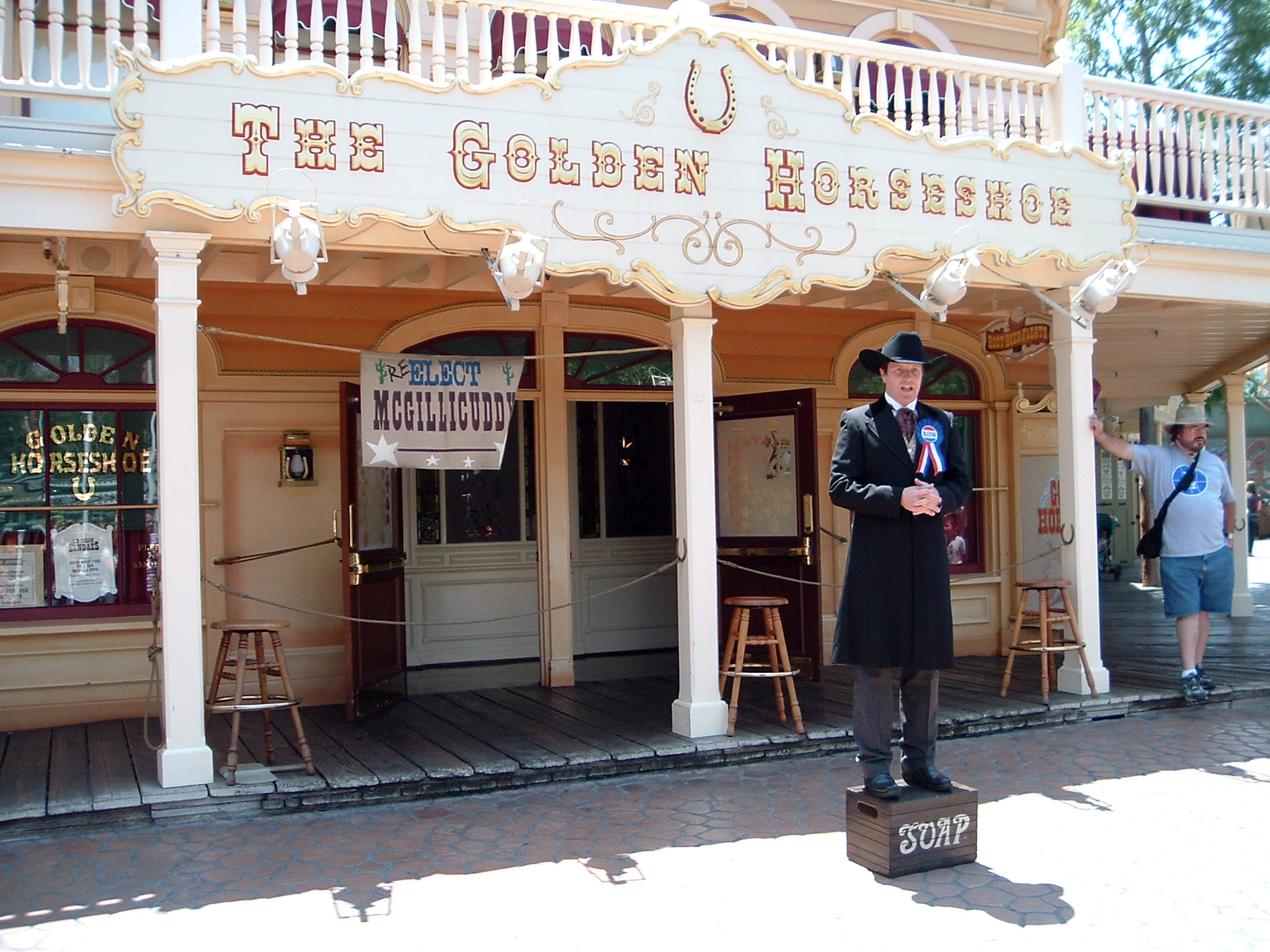
Frontierland's mayor

This comedy/melodrama ran two days a week from 2001 until 2003 and featured a supposed history of the founding of Frontierland.

=== Laughing Stock Company ===
Laughing Stock's improvised comedy show opened on June 18, 2012, and continued its run until November 15, 2019.

=== A Salute to the Golden Horseshoe Revue ===
This show, an "homage to those fun-filled, family-friendly musical variety shows of the past", was scheduled for a brief run from January 10 to February 4, 2013, every Thursday through Monday. It featured song and dance numbers from the original Golden Horseshoe Revue, such as "Hello, Everybody", "A Good Man Is Hard to Find", "Belly Up to the Bar" and "Can-Can".

=== Showdown at the Golden Horseshoe ===
This dueling piano show opened on November 22, 2019. Its run ended on March 14, 2020, when Disneyland closed in response to the coronavirus pandemic.

== Architecture ==
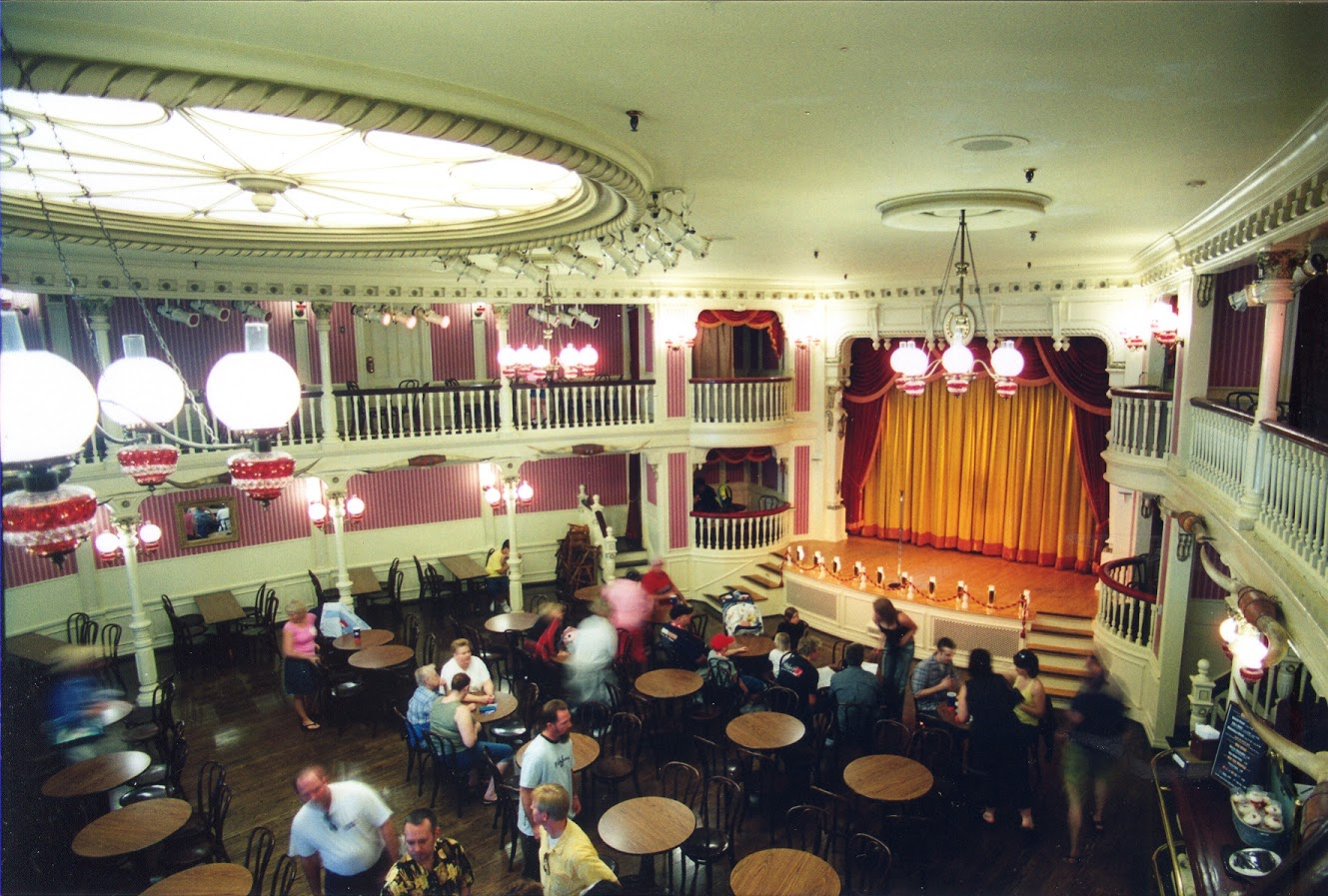
Interior of the Saloon

The interior of the saloon was designed by Harper Goff, the same person who designed a saloon set for the movie Calamity Jane starring Doris Day. Goff was already working on designing exteriors for buildings on Main Street, USA when asked to work on this project.
