= Graham Shepard =

English cartoonist

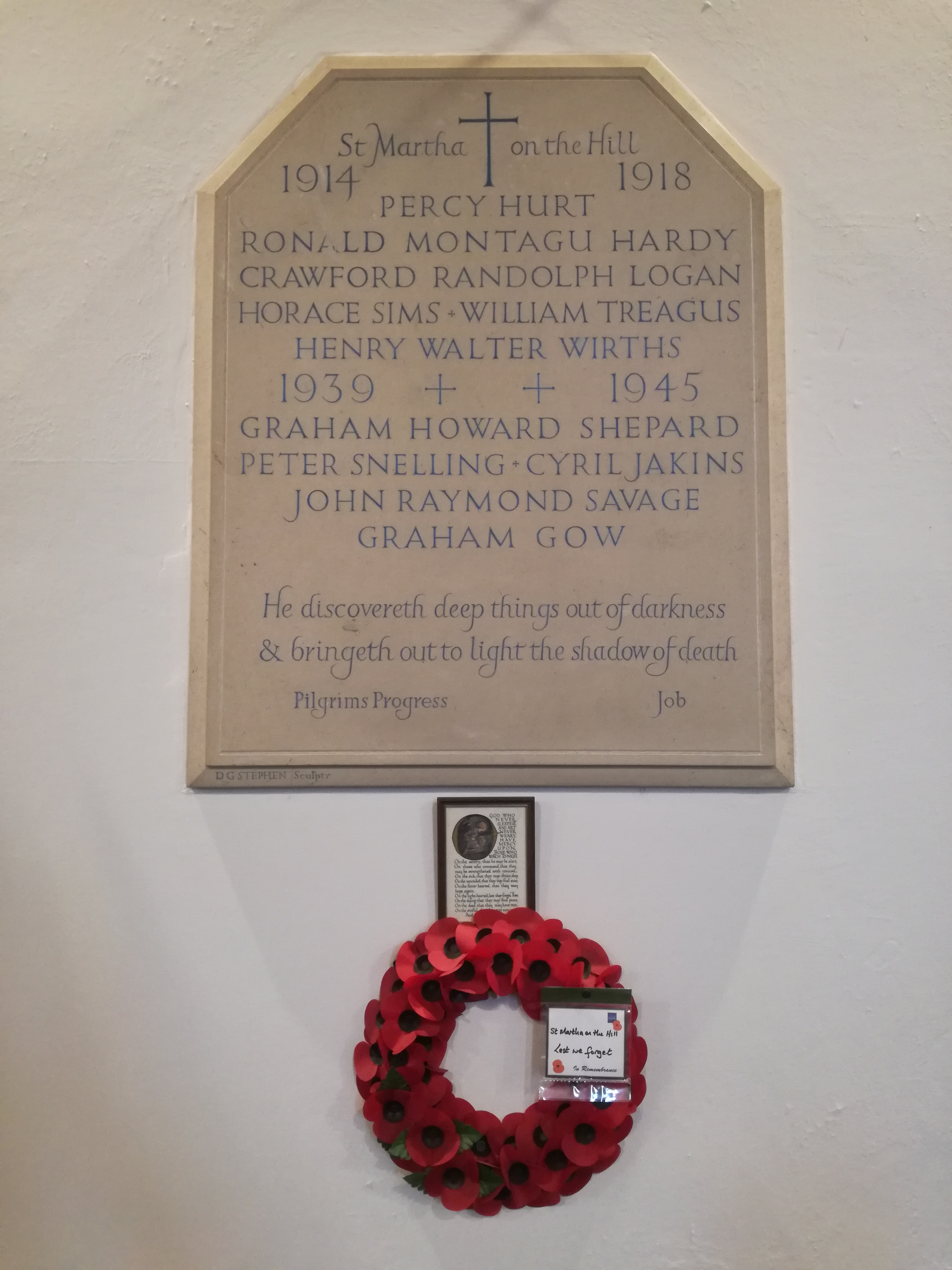
War memorial at St Martha's Church near Guildford, Surrey

Graham Howard Shepard (1907 – 20 September 1943) was an English illustrator and cartoonist.

He was the son of Ernest H. Shepard, the illustrator of Winnie-the-Pooh and The Wind in the Willows. He was educated at Marlborough College and Lincoln College, Oxford. At Marlborough he was a member of the college's secret 'Society of Amici' where he found himself a contemporary of John Betjeman and Anthony Blunt, and a close friend of Louis MacNeice. MacNeice's "He had a date" (1943) is loosely based on the life and death of Shepard.

At Oxford he was also a contemporary and friend of MacNeice and Osbert Lancaster.

Following in his father's footsteps, he became an illustrator and cartoonist, working for the Illustrated London News.

Shepard served in the RNVR during World War II. Lieutenant Shepard was lost along with all but one crew member when their ship, HMS Polyanthus, was sunk by the German submarine U-952 in the mid-Atlantic on 21 September 1943. The solitary survivor of Polyanthus drowned two days later on the morning of 23 September when HMS Itchen, the ship that had rescued him, was sunk by another German submarine, U-666.

Shepard was survived by his wife, Ann Faith Shepard, and their young daughter, Minette.

Shepard's younger sister, Mary Shepard, also became an illustrator, and is best known for her illustrations of P. L. Travers' Mary Poppins.
