= Mary Poppins Opens the Door =

1943 novel by P. L. Travers

- First edition cover
- Author: P. L. Travers
- Illustrator: Mary Shepard
- Series: Mary Poppins
- Genre: children, fantasy
- Publisher: Peter Davies; Reynal & Hitchcock (US)
- Publication date: 1943
- Publication place: United Kingdom
- Pages: 219 (UK); 239 (US)
- OCLC: 64447512
- LC Class: PZ7.T689 Mat
- Preceded by: Mary Poppins Comes Back
- Followed by: Mary Poppins in the Park

Mary Poppins Opens the Door is a British children's fantasy novel by the Australian-British writer P.L. Travers, the third book and last novel in the Mary Poppins series that features the magical English nanny Mary Poppins. It was published in 1943, by Harcourt, Brace & World, Inc and illustrated by Mary Shepard and Agnes Sims.

== Plot summary ==
On Guy Fawkes Night, Mary Poppins arrives in the wake of the last fireworks display by the Banks family. The Banks children, Michael, Jane, the twins, and Annabel plead with her to stay. She reluctantly agrees to do so "till the door opens." When an anxious Jane points out that the nursery door is always opening, she clarifies "the other door."

Mrs. Banks has Mary and the children find a piano tuner, who happens to be Mary's cousin, Mr. Twigley. When Mary and the children visit, Mr. Twigley tries to unburden himself from seven wishes given to him when he was born. Besides pianos, Mr. Twigley also specialises in songbirds such as nightingales, one of which he releases when he's finished. He also provides music boxes for Mary and the Banks children to dance to. When they return home later, the drawing room piano is playing perfectly, and when the Banks children ask Mary what happened, she sharply rebukes them.

Other adventures in the book include Mary telling the story of a king (implied to be Old King Cole) who was outsmarted by a cat (known as "The Cat That Looked at a King"), the park statue of Neleus that comes to life for a time during one of their outings, their visit to confectioner Miss Calico and her flying peppermint sticks, an undersea (High-Tide) party where Mary Poppins is the guest of honour, and a party between fairy tale rivals in the Crack between the Old Year and the New. When the children ask why Mary Poppins, a real person, is there, they are told that she can be considered as a fairy tale that has come true. The next morning, Jane and Michael find definite proof of the last night's adventure, and this time she does not deny it, simply telling them that they too may end up living happily ever after.

Finally, after Mary and the children have a non-magical (but nonetheless wondrous) afternoon playing on the swings at the Park, the citizens of the town as well as many other characters from the previous two books turn out in front of the house to have a farewell party. Before going inside, Mary urges the children to be good and remember everything she told them, and they realise that it is Mary, not the other characters, who is departing. They rush to the nursery to see her open and walk through the nursery door's reflection in the window. Mary Poppins then opens her parrot headed umbrella, and it soars up into the sky, taking her with it. The Banks Children are happy she kept her promise by staying till the "door" opened. Mrs Banks arrives afterwards, and sees the children alone. Mrs Brill tells her that Mary Poppins has left again, and she is distraught about what she is going to do without a nanny for the children. Mr Banks is distracted by the music playing outside, and encourages his wife to just forget about it and dance with him.

When he has finished dancing with his wife, he sees what he thinks is a shooting star, (though it is really Mary Poppins flying away on her umbrella) and they all wish upon it. The children wish to remember Mary Poppins for the rest of their lives, and they faintly make her out in the star. They wave and she waves back to them. The narrator remarks, "Mary Poppins herself had flown away, but the gifts she had brought would remain for always."

They promise to never forget her, and she hears this and smiles and waves to them, before the darkness hides her, and they see her and her umbrella for the last time ever.

The Banks Family sigh that Mary Poppins has gone, but happily decide to sit by the fire together. (This presumably meaning that the parents have decided to spend more time with their children thanks to Mary's lessons).

== Film adaptation ==
In 2004, Julie Andrews appeared in a live-action/animated 10-minute short film produced by DisneyToon Studios for the 40th Anniversary DVD release of Mary Poppins. The Cat That Looked at a King was based on Mary Poppins Opens the Door, and was the first project offered to The Answer Studio, which included former employees of Walt Disney Animation Japan.

As the film opens, two modern-day British children are looking at chalk drawings at the same location where Dick Van Dyke's character, Bert, did his artwork in the original movie. Andrews (as herself) greets the children and takes them into the chalk drawing where they watch the tale of a cat (Tracey Ullman) that challenges a king (David Ogden Stiers) to a trivia contest. If the cat wins, the king must give up his obsession with facts and figures and reconnect with his queen. Back in the real world—where she, like Poppins, denies that she has been away—Andrews and the cat face each other as the shadow of Mary Poppins is framed by one of the chalk drawings.

The concept of Mary Poppins staying until "the door opens" is used in Mary Poppins Returns.
