= P. L. Travers =

Australian-British novelist, actress and journalist (1899–1996)

P. L. Travers OBE
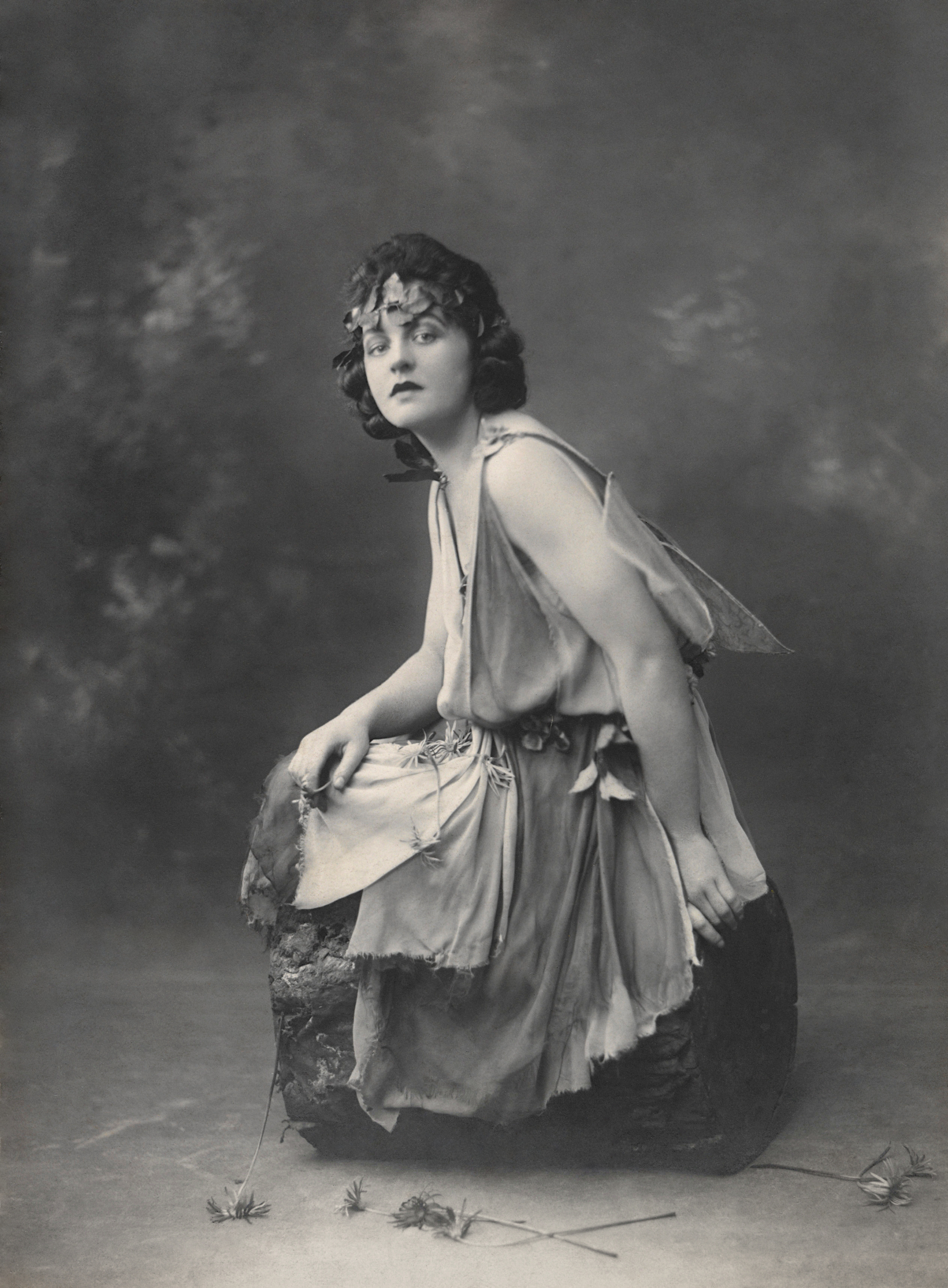
- Travers in the role of Titania in a production of A Midsummer Night's Dream, c. 1924
- Born: Helen Lyndon Goff; 9 August 1899; Maryborough, Colony of Queensland, British Empire
- Died: 23 April 1996 (aged 96); Chelsea, London, England
- Resting place: St Mary the Virgin's Church, Twickenham, London
- Occupations: Writer; actress; journalist
- Children: 1
- Relatives: Barbara Moriarty (sister)
- Writing career
- Pen name: Pamela Lyndon Travers
- Genres: Children's literature, fantasy
- Notable work: Mary Poppins book series

Pamela Lyndon Travers OBE (/ˈtrævərz/ TRAV-ərz; born Helen Lyndon Goff; 9 August 1899 – 23 April 1996) was an Australian-British writer who spent most of her career in England. She is best known for the Mary Poppins series of books, which feature the eponymous magical nanny.

Goff was born in Maryborough, Queensland, and grew up in the Australian bush before being sent to boarding school in Sydney. Her writing was first published when she was a teenager, and she also worked briefly as a professional Shakespearean actress. Upon immigrating to England at the age of 24, she took the name "Pamela Lyndon Travers" and adopted the pen name P. L. Travers in 1933 while writing the first of eight Mary Poppins books.

Travers travelled to New York City during World War II while working for the British Ministry of Information. At that time, Walt Disney contacted her about selling to Walt Disney Productions the rights for a film adaptation of Mary Poppins. After years of contact, which included visits to Travers at her home in London, Walt Disney obtained the rights and the film Mary Poppins premiered in 1964.

In 2004, a stage musical adaptation of the books and the film opened in the West End; it premiered on Broadway in 2006. A film based on Disney's efforts to persuade Travers to sell him the Mary Poppins film rights was released in 2013, Saving Mr. Banks, in which Travers is portrayed by Emma Thompson. In a 2018 sequel to the original film, Mary Poppins Returns, Poppins, played by Emily Blunt, returns to help the Banks family once again.

== Early life ==
Helen Lyndon Goff, also known as Lyndon, was born on 9 August 1899 in Maryborough, Queensland, Australia, at her family's home, which was the manager's upstairs residence at a bank in the city's "Central Business District (CBD)". This bank building, the Australian Joint Stock Bank Building, Maryborough is on the Queensland State Heritage Register.

Her mother, Margaret Agnes Goff (née Morehead), was of Scottish and Irish descent and the sister of Boyd Dunlop Morehead, Premier of Queensland from 1888 to 1890. Her London-born father of Irish descent, Travers Robert Goff, was unsuccessful as a bank manager owing to his alcoholism, and was eventually demoted to the position of bank clerk. The two had been married on 9 November 1898, nine months before Helen was born. The name Helen came from a maternal great-grandmother and great-aunt. Although she was born in Australia, Goff considered herself British and later expressed the sentiment that her birth had been "misplaced".

As a baby she visited her great-aunt Ellie in Sydney for the first time; Ellie would figure prominently in her early life, as Goff often stayed with her. Goff lived a simple life as a child, given a penny a week by her parents as well as occasional other gifts. Her mother was known for giving Goff maxims and instructions while she loved "the memory of her father" and his stories of life in Ireland. Goff was also an avid reader, later stating that she could read at three years old, and particularly enjoying fairy tales.

The family lived in Maryborough until Goff was three years old, when they relocated to Brisbane in 1902. Goff recalled an idealised version of her childhood in Maryborough as an adult. Her sister Barbara Moriarty was born shortly after the family moved to Brisbane. In mid-1905 Goff went to spend time with Ellie in Sydney. Later that year, Goff returned and the family moved to Allora, Queensland. In part because Goff was often left alone as a child by parents who were "caught up in their own importance", she developed a "form of self-sufficiency and [...had an] idiosyncratic form of fantasy life", according to her biographer Valerie Lawson, often pretending to be a mother hen—at times for hours. Goff also wrote poetry, which her family paid little attention to. In 1906 Goff attended the Allora Public School. Travers Goff died at home in January 1907. Lyndon would struggle to come to terms with this fact for the next six years.

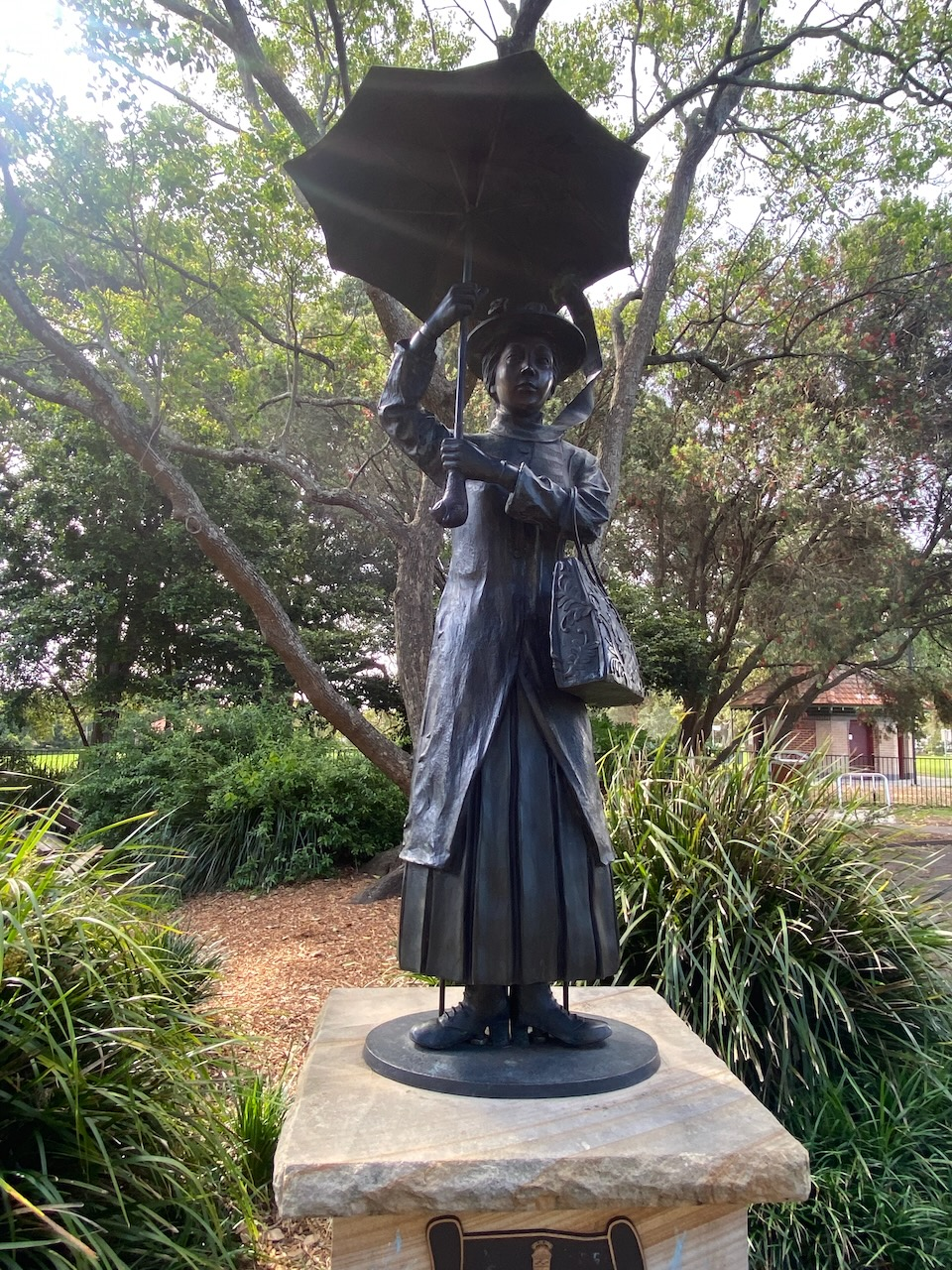
Mary Poppins statue in Ashfield Park in honour of Goff (Travers) who lived nearby from 1918 to 1924

Following her father's death, Goff, along with her mother and sisters, moved to Bowral, New South Wales, in 1907. In Bowral she attended the local branch of the Sydney Church of England Girls Grammar School as a day student. From 1912 Goff boarded at Normanhurst School in Ashfield, a suburb of Sydney. At Normanhurst, she began to love theatre. In 1914 she published an article in the Normanhurst School Magazine, her first, and later that year directed a school concert. The following year, Goff played the role of Bottom in a production of A Midsummer Night's Dream. She became a prefect and sought to have a successful career as an actress. Goff's first employment was at the Australian Gas Light Company as a cashier. Between 1918 and 1924 she resided at 40 Pembroke Street, Ashfield. In 1920 Goff appeared in her first pantomime. The following year she was hired to work in a Shakespearean Company run by Allan Wilkie based in Sydney.

== Career ==
Goff had her first role in the troupe as Anne Page in a March 1921 performance of The Merry Wives of Windsor. She decided to go by the stage name of "Pamela Lyndon Travers", taking Travers from her father's name and Pamela because she thought it a "pretty" name that "flowed" with Travers. Travers toured New South Wales beginning in early 1921 and returned to Wilkie's troupe in Sydney by April 1922. That month, in a review of her performance as Titania in A Midsummer Night's Dream, a critic for Frank Morton's Triad wrote that her performance was 'all too human'.

The troupe travelled to New Zealand, where Travers met and fell in love with a journalist for The Sun in Christchurch, New Zealand. The journalist took one of Travers' poems to his editor and it was published in the Sun. Even after she left New Zealand Travers continued to submit works to the Sun, eventually having her own column called "Pamela Passes: the Sun's Sydney Letter". Travers also had work accepted and published by publications including the Shakespeare Quarterly, Vision, and The Green Room. She was told to not make a career out of journalism and turned to poetry. The Triad published "Mother Song", one of her poems, in March 1922, under the name "Pamela Young Travers". The Bulletin published Travers' poem, "Keening", on 20 March 1923, and she became a frequent contributor. In May 1923 she found employment at the Triad, where she was given the discretion to fill at least four pages of a women's section—titled "A Woman Hits Back"—every issue. Travers wrote poetry, journalism, and prose for her section; Lawson notes that "erotic verse and coquetry" figured prominently. She published a book of poetry, Bitter Sweet.

=== In England ===
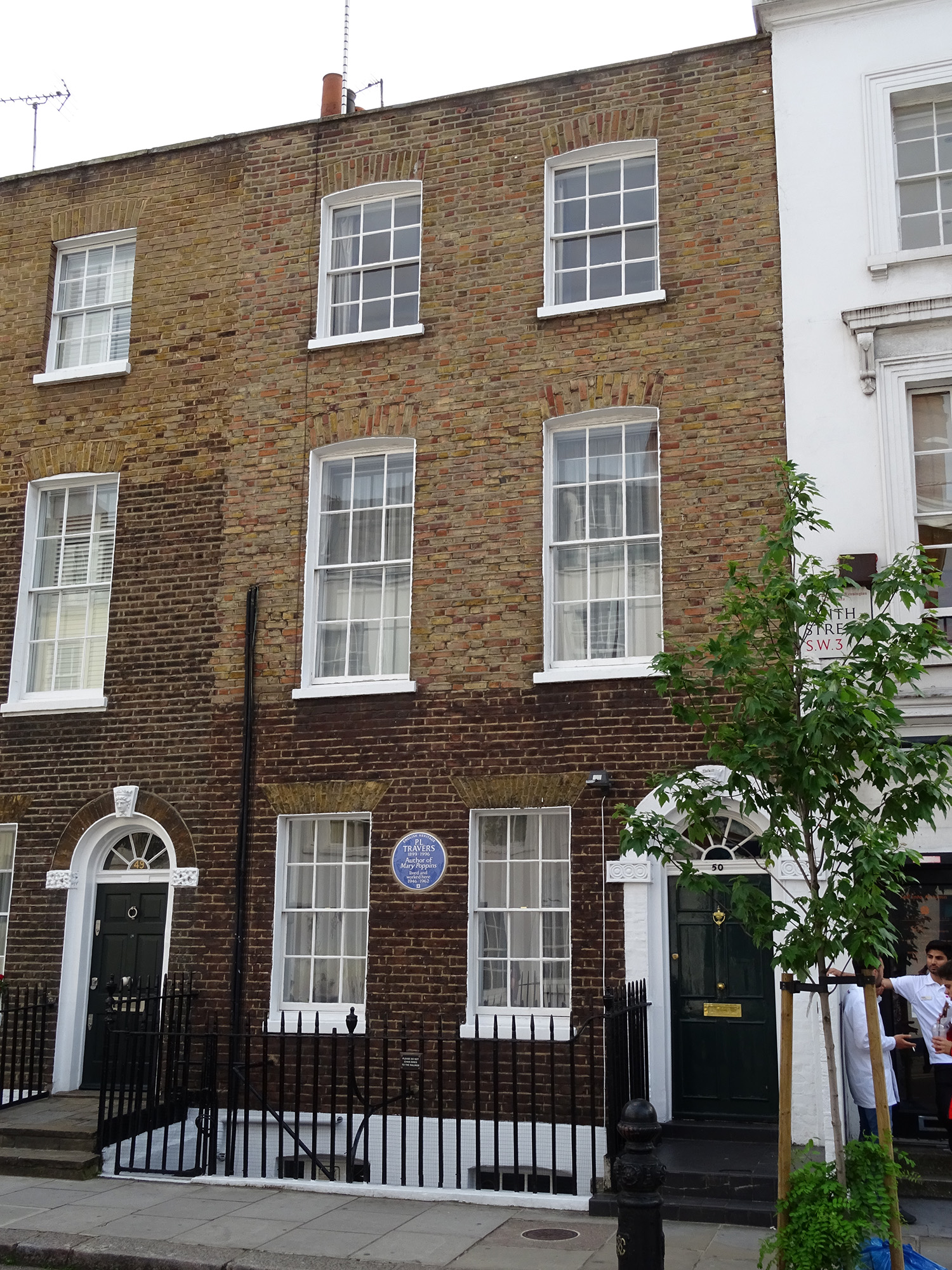
Travers' second London home in 50 Smith Street, Chelsea, London

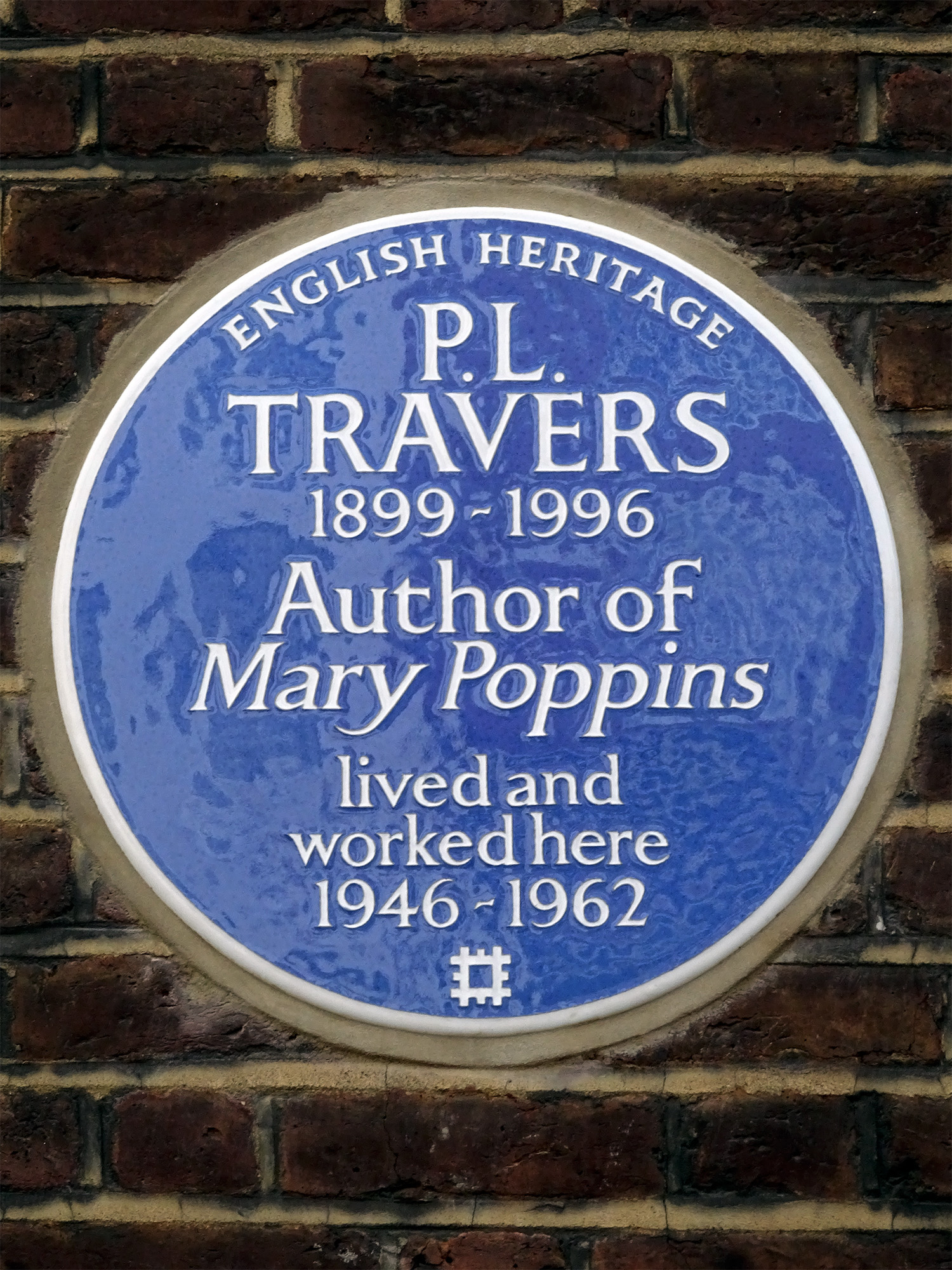
Blue plaque at the address

On 9 February 1924, Travers left Australia for England, settling in London. She only revisited Australia once, in the 1960s. For four years she wrote poetry for the Irish Statesman, beginning while in Ireland in 1925 when Travers met the poet George William Russell (who wrote under the name "Æ") who, as editor of the Statesman, accepted some of her poems for publication. Through Russell, whose kindness towards younger writers was extensive, Travers met W. B. Yeats, Oliver St. John Gogarty and other Irish poets who fostered her interest in and knowledge of world mythology.

After visiting Fontainebleau in France, Travers met George Ivanovich Gurdjieff, an occultist, of whom she became a "disciple". Around the same time she was taught by Carl Gustav Jung in Switzerland. In 1931, she moved with her friend Madge Burnand from their rented flat in London to a thatched cottage in Sussex. There, in the winter of 1933, she began to write Mary Poppins. During the 1930s, Travers reviewed drama for The New English Weekly and, following a visit to the Soviet Union in 1932, published the book Moscow Excursion (1934). Mary Poppins was published that year with great success. Many sequels followed.

During the Second World War, Travers worked for the British Ministry of Information, spending five years in the US, publishing I Go by Sea, I Go by Land in 1941. At the invitation of her friend John Collier, the US Commissioner of Indian Affairs, Travers spent two summers living among the Navajo, Hopi and Pueblo peoples, studying their mythology and folklore. Travers moved back to England at the end of the war, where she continued writing. She moved into 50 Smith Street, Chelsea, London, which is commemorated with an English Heritage blue plaque. She returned to the US in 1965 and became writer-in-residence at Radcliffe College from 1965 to 1966 and at Smith College in 1966 and lecturing at Scripps College in 1970. She published various works and edited Parabola: the Magazine of Myth and Tradition from 1976 to her death.

== Mary Poppins ==
In 1926, Travers published a short story, "Mary Poppins and the Match Man", for The Sun newspaper, in Christchurch, New Zealand, which introduced the nanny character of Mary Poppins and Bert the street artist. Published in London in 1934, the children's book Mary Poppins was Travers' first literary success. Seven sequels followed, the last in 1988, when Travers was 89. The books were illustrated by Mary Shepard. Travers had initially approached Shepard's father, the illustrator of Winnie-the-Pooh by A. A. Milne, but he was too busy at the time before she discovered Mary, then 23, from her work on a Christmas card, and hired her instead.

While appearing as a guest on BBC Radio 4's radio programme Desert Island Discs in May 1977, Travers revealed that the name "M. Poppins" originated from childhood stories that she contrived for her sisters, and that she was still in possession of a book from that era with this name inscribed within. Travers's great-aunt, Helen Morehead, who lived in Woollahra, Sydney, and used to say "Spit spot, into bed," is a likely inspiration for the character.

Richard Eyre, who directed the stage adaptation of the books in the West End, viewed Mary Poppins as being "a wishful autobiography" for Travers, stating, "If she could have rearranged her childhood, this is how it would have been. Instead, she grew up with an alcoholic father in Queensland, willing herself to be in England. And when she got to England, she disavowed her background, becoming an upper-middle-class Englishwoman. Number 17, Cherry Tree Lane, was the locus of a dream childhood."

=== Disney adaptation ===
Among the fans of the Mary Poppins novels were the two young daughters of Walt Disney. Beginning in the 1940s, Disney made efforts to purchase the film rights to Mary Poppins, which included visits to Travers at her home in London. In 1961, Travers arrived in Los Angeles on a flight from London, her first-class ticket having been paid for by Disney, and finally agreed to sell the rights, in no small part because she was financially in dire straits. Travers was an adviser in the production, but she disapproved of the softened Poppins character in its Disney version. She felt ambivalent about turning the story into a musical, and she so hated the use of animation that she ruled out any further adaptations of the series. Walt Disney Pictures released Mary Poppins in 1964. Travers received no invitation to the film's star-studded Hollywood premiere until she "embarrassed a Disney executive into extending one". At the after-party, she said loudly, "Well. The first thing that has to go is the animation sequence." Disney replied, "Pamela, that ship has sailed."

End of the first West End run of the Mary Poppins musical on 12 January 2008

Travers so disliked the Disney adaptation and the way she felt she had been treated during the production that when producer Cameron Mackintosh approached her years later about making the British stage musical, she acquiesced only on conditions that British writers alone and no one from the original film production were to be directly involved. That specifically excluded the Sherman Brothers from writing additional songs for the production. However, original songs and other aspects from the 1964 film were allowed to be incorporated into the production. Those points were later stipulated in her last will and testament.

In the 1977 interview on the BBC's Desert Island Discs, Travers remarked about the film, "I've seen it once or twice, and I've learned to live with it. It's glamorous and it's a good film on its own level, but I don't think it is very like my books."

=== Later films based on Travers' life and work ===
The 2013 film Saving Mr. Banks is a dramatised retelling of both the working process during the planning of Mary Poppins and of Travers's early life, drawing parallels with Mary Poppins and that of the author's childhood. The film stars Emma Thompson as P. L. Travers and Tom Hanks as Walt Disney. Thompson considered it the most challenging of her career because she had "never really played anyone quite so contradictory or difficult before," but found her "a blissful joy to embody."

In 2018, 54 years after the release of the original Mary Poppins film, a sequel was released titled Mary Poppins Returns, with Emily Blunt starring as Mary Poppins. The film, in which Mary Poppins returns to help Jane and Michael one year after a family tragedy, is set 25 years after the events of the first film.

== Personal life ==
Travers was reluctant to share details about her personal life, saying she "most identified with Anonymous as a writer" and asked whether "biographies are of any use at all". Patricia Demers was allowed to interview her in 1988 but not to ask about her personal life.

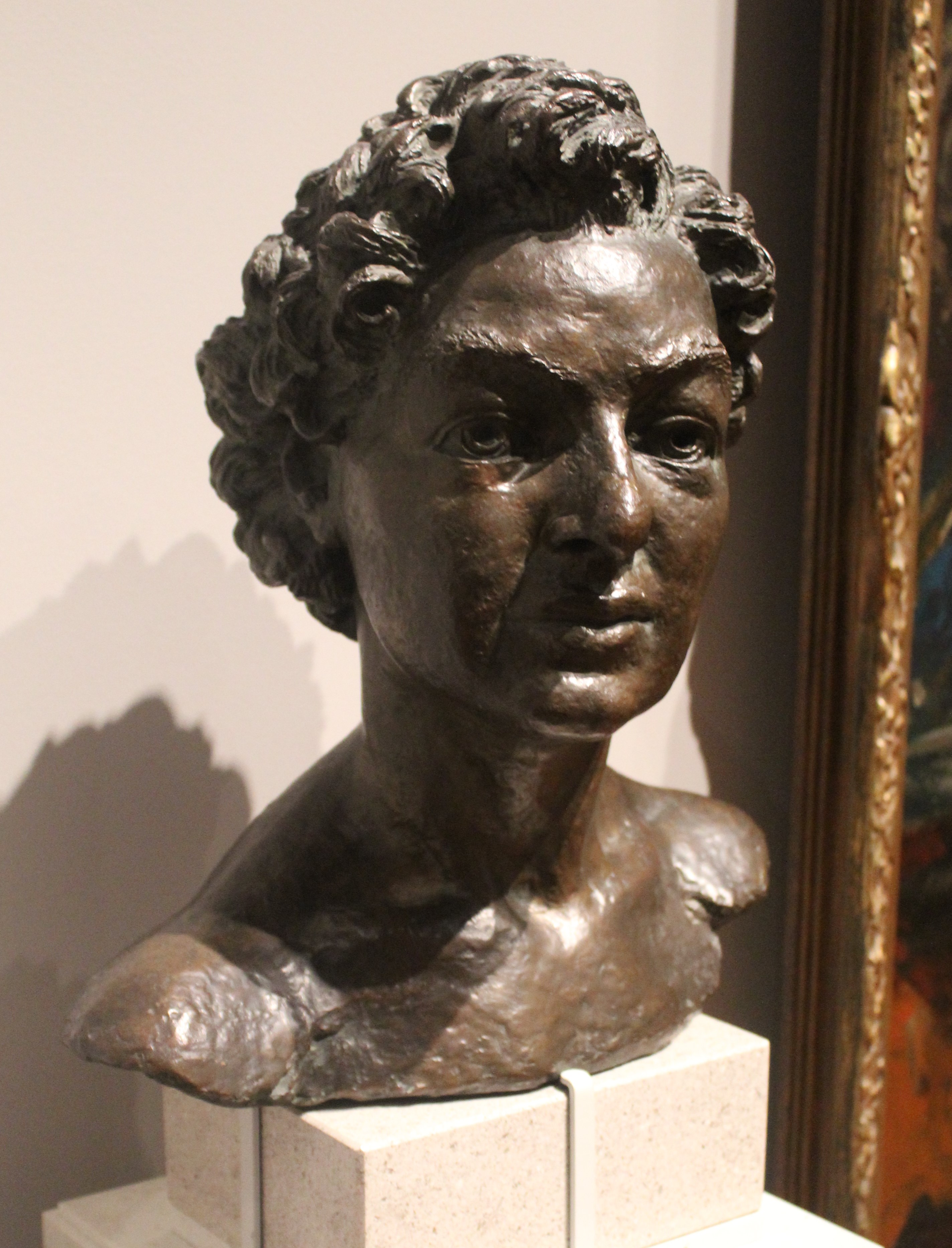
Bust of P. L. Travers, c. 1944, by Gertrude Hermes, National Portrait Gallery, London

Travers never married. Though she had numerous fleeting relationships with men throughout her life, she lived for more than a decade with Madge Burnand. They shared a London flat from 1927 to 1934, then moved to Pound Cottage near Mayfield, East Sussex, where Travers published the first of the Mary Poppins books.

At the age of 40, two years after moving out on her own, Travers adopted a baby boy from Ireland whom she named Camillus Travers. He was the grandchild of Joseph Hone, the first biographer of George Moore and W. B. Yeats, who was raising his seven grandchildren with his wife. Camillus was unaware of his true parentage (Travers had told him she was his mother) or the existence of any siblings until the age of 17, when Anthony Hone, his twin brother, came to London and knocked on the door of Travers's house at 50 Smith Street, Chelsea. He had been drinking and demanded to see his brother. Travers refused and threatened to call the police. Anthony left but, soon after, following an argument with Travers, Camillus went looking for his brother and found him in a pub on Chelsea's King's Road. Anthony had been fostered and raised by the family of the essayist Hubert Butler in Ireland. Through Camillus, Travers had three grandchildren.

Travers was appointed Officer of the Order of the British Empire (OBE) in the 1977 New Year Honours. The investiture ceremony took place later that year at Buckingham Palace, with the Duke of Kent standing in for Queen Elizabeth II. She died in London on 23 April 1996 at the age of 96. She is buried at St Mary the Virgin's Church, Twickenham, London. Although Travers never fully accepted the way the Disney film version of Mary Poppins had portrayed her nanny figure, the film did make her rich. Her estate was valued for probate in September 1996 at £2,044,708.

== The Story Bank ==
Travers' birthplace and childhood home in Maryborough is now a museum dedicated to her legacy, called The Story Bank. There is also an annual Mary Poppins festival in Maryborough, celebrating the city's connection to Travers.

== Travers crater ==
In 2018, a crater on the planet Mercury was named in her honour.

== Works ==
=== Books ===
- Mary Poppins, London: Gerald Howe, 1934
- Mary Poppins Comes Back, London: L. Dickson & Thompson Ltd., 1935
- I Go By Sea, I Go By Land, London: Peter Davies, 1941
- Aunt Sass, New York: Reynal & Hitchcock, 1941
- Ah Wong, New York: Reynal & Hitchcock, 1943
- Mary Poppins Opens the Door, London: Peter Davies, 1943
- Johnny Delaney, New York: Reynal & Hitchcock, 1944
- Mary Poppins in the Park, London: Peter Davies, 1952
- Gingerbread Shop, 1952 (an adapted version of the "Mrs. Corry" chapter from Mary Poppins)
- Mr. Wigg's Birthday Party, 1952 (an adapted version of the "Laughing Gas" chapter from Mary Poppins)
- The Magic Compass, 1953 (an adapted version of the "Bad Tuesday" chapter from Mary Poppins)
- Mary Poppins From A to Z, London: Collins, 1963
- The Fox at the Manger, London: Collins, 1963
- Friend Monkey, London: Collins, 1972
- Mary Poppins in the Kitchen, New York & London: Harcourt Brace Jovanovich, 1975
- Two Pairs of Shoes, New York: Viking Press, 1980
- Mary Poppins in Cherry Tree Lane, London: Collins, 1982
- Mary Poppins and the House Next Door, London: Collins. 1988.

=== Collections ===
- Stories, 1952

=== Non-fiction ===
- Moscow Excursion, New York: Reynal & Hitchcock, 1934
- George Ivanovitch Gurdjieff, Toronto: Traditional Studies Press, 1973
- About the Sleeping Beauty, London: Collins, 1975
- What the Bee Knows: Reflections on Myth, Symbol and Story, New Paltz: Codhill Press, 1989
