= E. H. Shepard =

English artist (1879–1976)

E. H. Shepard OBE MC
- Shepard in 1932
- Born: Ernest Howard Shepard; 10 December 1879; St John's Wood, London, England
- Died: 24 March 1976 (aged 96); Midhurst, England
- Children: Mary Shepard; Graham Shepard
- Military career
- Conflicts: World War I
- Other work: Artist and book illustrator of The Wind in the Willows and Winnie-the-Pooh

Ernest Howard Shepard (10 December 1879 – 24 March 1976) was an English artist and book illustrator. He is known especially for illustrations of the anthropomorphic animal and soft toy characters in The Wind in the Willows and Winnie-the-Pooh.

Shepard's original 1926 illustrated map of the Hundred Acre Wood, which features in the opening pages of Winnie-the-Pooh (and also appears in the opening animation in the first Disney adaptation in 1966), sold for £430,000 ($600,000) at Sotheby's in London, setting a world record for book illustrations.

== Early life and training ==
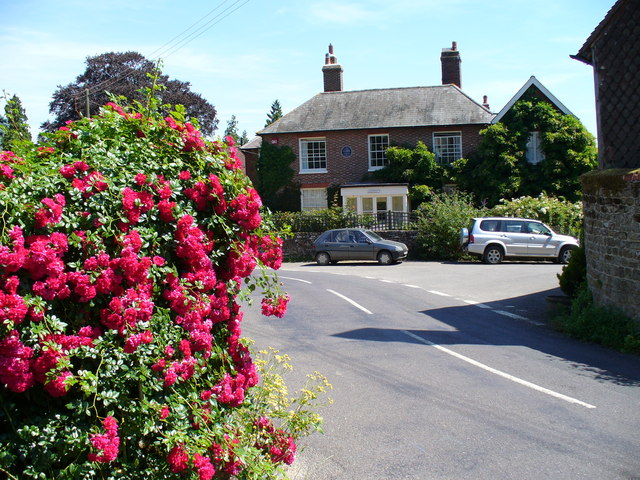
Shepard's house in Lodsworth, marked with a blue plaque

Shepard was born in St John's Wood, London, son of Henry Dunkin Shepard, an architect, and Jessie Harriet, daughter of watercolour painter William Lee. Having shown some promise in drawing at St Paul's School, in 1897 he enrolled in the Heatherley School of Fine Art in Chelsea. After a year there, he attended the Royal Academy Schools, winning a Landseer scholarship in 1899 and a British Institute prize in 1900. There he met Florence Eleanor Chaplin, whom he married in 1904. By 1906, Shepard had become an established illustrator, having produced work for illustrated editions of Aesop's Fables, David Copperfield, and Tom Brown's Schooldays. He began contributing to Punch in 1907 after submitting illustrations to the magazine two or three times a week. The couple moved to Shamley Green, near Guildford, in 1904 shortly after his marriage and his children were born there.

Shepard's paintings appeared in a number of exhibitions, including the Royal Society of Artists in Birmingham, the Glasgow Institute of Fine Arts, the Walker Art Gallery in Liverpool (twice), the Manchester Art Gallery, and the Royal Academy in London (sixteen times). His wife, who was also a painter, found a home in London's West End venue for her own modest output during a 25-year career.

== First World War service ==
When the First World War broke out in 1914, Shepard was in his mid-thirties and received a commission as a second lieutenant in the Royal Garrison Artillery, an arm of the Royal Artillery. He served with the 105th Siege Battery, which crossed to France in May 1916 and went into action at the Battle of the Somme.

By the autumn of that year, Shepard started working for the Intelligence Department, where he sketched the combat area within the view of his battery position. Throughout the war, he continued to contribute regularly to Punch, including drawings and paintings of the European countryside he travelled to. Shepard's wartime cartoons were grounded in direct observation, drawing on his experiences as an officer on the Western Front. They depicted the soldiers' everyday lives, focusing on their experiences in the trenches and often highlighting the contrast between official narratives and the soldiers' realities. His illustrations were extremely detailed, depicting the British military's shortage of clothing and equipment, and the soldiers' hunger and physical exhaustion.

On 16 February 1917, he was made an acting captain whilst second-in-command of his battery, and briefly served as an acting major from late April to early May of that year during the Battle of Arras before reverting to acting captain. He was promoted to substantive lieutenant on 1 July 1917. Whilst acting as captain, he was awarded the Military Cross. His citation read:

For conspicuous gallantry and devotion to duty. As forward Observation Officer he continued to observe and send back valuable information, in spite of heavy shell and machine gun fire. His courage and coolness were conspicuous.

Later in 1917, his battery participated in the final stages of the Battle of Passchendaele where it came under heavy fire and suffered a number of casualties. At the end of the year, it was sent to support a disastrous situation on the Italian Front, coming into action on the Montello Hill. Shepard remained with his battery for their victory at Vittorio Veneto. After the Armistice of Villa Giusti in November 1918, Shepard was promoted to acting major in command of the battery, and given the duty of administering captured enemy guns. Demobilisation began at Christmas 1918 and the 105th Siege Battery was disbanded in March 1919.

== Post-war career ==
After the war, Shepard was hired as a full-time cartoonist at Punch. He would meet weekly with the other employees to discuss upcoming political cartoons. He was promoted to lead cartoonist in 1945. Here, when working closely with publisher E. V. Lucas, he was introduced to A. A. Milne. Lucas encouraged Milne to release several verses of When We Were Very Young in Punch prior to the book's release, and Shepard's illustrations accompanied eleven of these from January to June 1924. Shepard viewed his association with Punch as highly prestigious, given its connection to legacy artists John Tenniel and Ebenezer Landells, his wife's grandfather. He was removed from this post in 1953 by Punch's new editor, Malcolm Muggeridge. His work was also part of the painting event in the art competition at the 1928 Summer Olympics.

When World War II broke out, Shepard produced a short series of political cartoons commenting on heavily involved political leaders, such as Adolf Hitler and Benito Mussolini. However, he regarded himself as less suited for caricature and returned to illustration. Unlike most cartoonists, he avoided exaggerated or aggressive caricature and instead used a restrained and subtle style to convey commentary. Some critics have agreed, commenting on the poor fit of his delicate technique for political satire cartooning.

== Collaboration with A. A. Milne ==
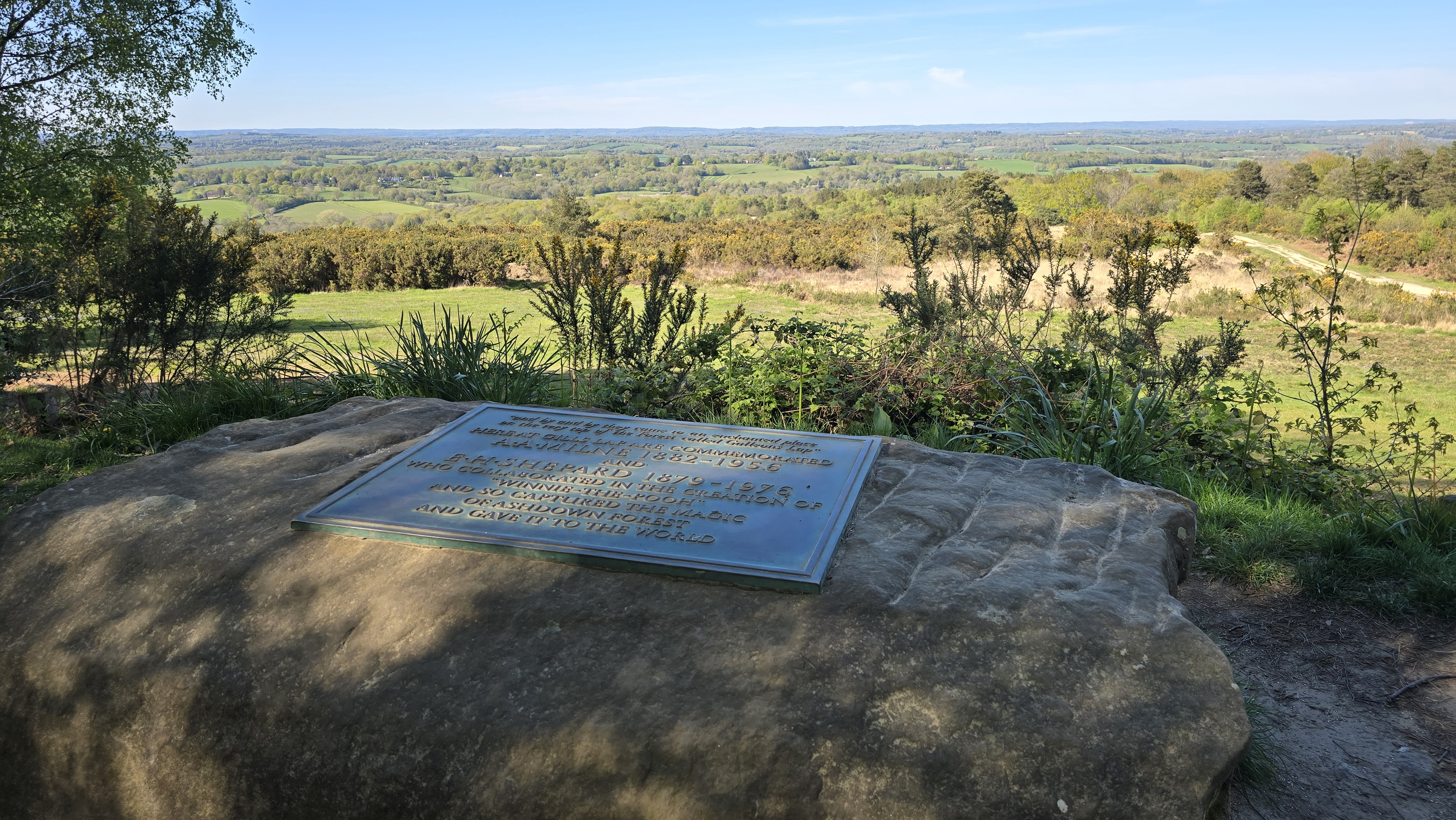
A. A. Milne and E. H. Shepard memorial in Ashdown Forest

Content with Shepard's illustrations in When We Were Very Young, Milne insisted Shepard illustrate Winnie-the-Pooh. Milne and Shepard worked well together, meeting frequently for tea to share Milne's notes and Shepard's sketches, or occasionally to explore Ashdown Forest, the inspiration of the Hundred Acre Wood, which housed Milne's characters. Shepard's illustrations are captivating because they come from real-life observation, such as spending time in the forest or familiarising himself with children's toys; he was always seen with a sketchbook as he would sketch from real life.

His illustrative style has been described as naturalistic, characterised by gentle, loose line work. Especially when sketching landscapes, he retained the looseness of his initial sketches in his finished illustrations, reflecting close observation of natural forms. Shepard often depicts figures with a clear sense of purpose, even when physically at rest. His thoughtful approach to landscape, especially trees, reflects this as he focuses closely on how they grow, stand, and are experienced from within or beneath their branches. More generally, he used a "lost-and-found" style in his landscape illustrations to suggest form through selective detail, allowing the reader to complete the image; when drawing characters, he used a "gone-over" line style, which is heavier and more defined. According to Nilay Erdem Ayyildiz, associate professor at Fırat University, these techniques, along with Milne's plot, present characters like Pooh as both inanimate toys and characters capable of thought and feeling. According to Ayyildiz and Erica Wetter, executive editor of humanities at Stanford University Press, Shepard's illustrations visually reinforce this duality, and readers often rely on these illustrations to understand the plot and humour.

Shepard often annotated his sketches to ensure an in-depth spatial understanding and consistency. For example, in The House at Pooh Corner, when Owl's house collapses and its orientation shifts, he first drew the house upright and labelled how each element would transform once overturned.

Realising Shepard's contribution to the book's success, the writer arranged for Shepard to receive a share of his royalties. Milne also inscribed a copy of Winnie-the-Pooh with the following personal verse:

When I am gone,
Let Shepard decorate my tomb,
And put (if there is room)
Two pictures on the stone:
Piglet from page a hundred and eleven,
And Pooh and Piglet walking (157) ...
And Peter, thinking that they are my own,
Will welcome me to Heaven.

In the 1960s, the Walt Disney Company acquired the licensing rights to Winnie-the-Pooh and vowed that animation would adhere closely to Shepard's original illustrations. For example, in The Many Adventures of Winnie the Pooh (1977), Milne's map of the Hundred Acre Wood was shown at the start of the film and backgrounds of the book's pages were spread throughout. Yet, Shepard's characters became increasingly "Disneyified", moving away from his naturalistic line work towards a more rounded and exaggerated form. Over time, Disney largely erased Shepard's visual influence, as seen in details such as Pooh's consistent depiction in a red t-shirt.

== Reception and legacy ==
Shepard's illustrations have left a lasting influence on later generations of artists. Illustrator Sophie Blackwall has referenced his illustrations in Winnie-the-Pooh as her primary inspiration, noting his ability to convey emotional depth through a few simple pen-and-ink lines on black paper, an approach that has now informed her own illustrative technique. Furthermore, he has been described as the "last of the great Victorian Black and White men", placing his work at the end of a symbolic artistic era that included legends such as Charles Keene and Arthur Boyd Houghton. Children's author Annette Bay Pimentel has suggested that the lasting success of Winnie-the-Pooh depends in large part on Shepard's illustrations. Yet, some critics claimed that Shepard's work was less successful when illustrations forced humour, as they became more exaggerated and less grounded in observation.

Eventually Shepard came to resent "that silly old bear" as he felt that he was overly associated with Winnie-the-Pooh, yet received little praise for his other illustrative successes. He lived to see Disney produce its animated version and pronounced it "a complete travesty."

300 of Shepard's preliminary sketches for Winnie-the-Pooh were exhibited at the Victoria and Albert Museum in 1969, when he was 90 years old.

A Shepard painting of Winnie the Pooh, believed to have been painted in the 1930s for a Bristol teashop, is his only known oil painting of the famous teddy bear. It was purchased at an auction for $243,000 in London late in 2000. The painting is displayed in the Pavilion Gallery at Assiniboine Park in Winnipeg, Manitoba, Canada, the city after which Winnie is named.

Shepard wrote two autobiographies: Drawn from Memory (1957) and Drawn From Life (1961).

In 1972, Shepard gave his personal collection of papers and illustrations to the University of Surrey. These now form the E.H. Shepard Archive.

Shepard was made an Officer of the Order of the British Empire in the 1972 Birthday Honours.

== Personal life ==
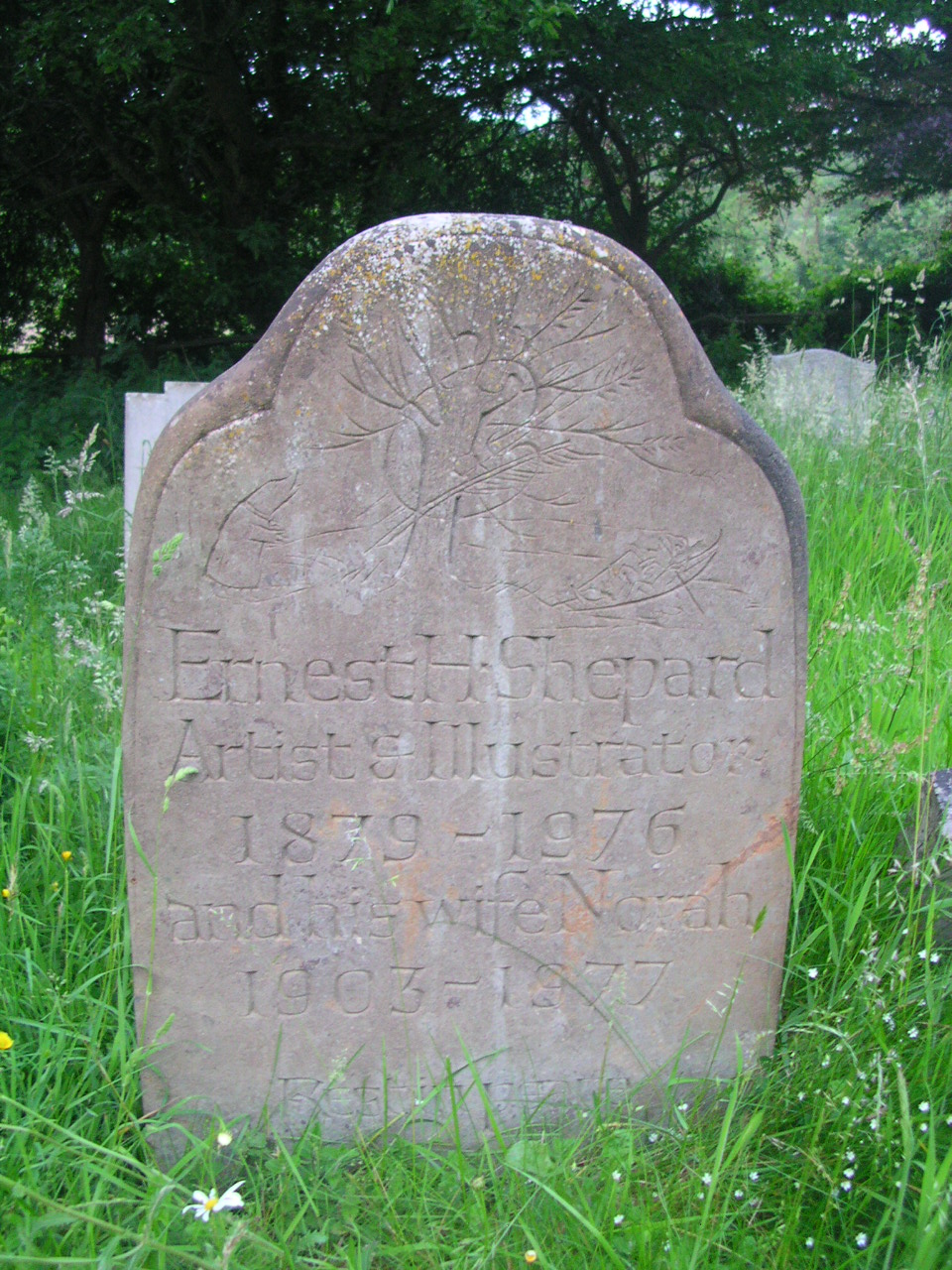
Shepard's grave at St Peter's Church, Lodsworth

Shepard lived at Melina Place in St John's Wood and from 1955 in Lodsworth, West Sussex. He and Florence had two children, Graham (born 1907) and Mary (born 1909), who both became illustrators. Lt. Graham Shepard died when his ship HMS Polyanthus was sunk by German submarine U-952 in September 1943. Mary married E.V. Knox, the editor of Punch, and became known as the illustrator of the Mary Poppins series of children's books. Florence Shepard died in 1927. In November 1943 Shepard married Norah Carroll, a nurse at St Mary's Hospital, Paddington. They remained married until his death on 24 March 1976. In 1966, he called the Disney Animation short film Winnie the Pooh and the Honey Tree a travesty.

== Works illustrated ==
- 1924 – When We Were Very Young
- 1925 – Playtime and Company; Holly Tree
- 1926 – Winnie-the-Pooh; Everybody's Pepys
- 1927 – Jeremy; Little One's Log; Let's Pretend; Now We Are Six; Fun and Fantasy
- 1928 – The House at Pooh Corner; The Golden Age
- 1930 – Everybody's Boswell; Dream Days
- 1931 – The Wind in the Willows; Christmas Poems; Bevis; Mother Goose
- 1932 – Sycamore Square
- 1932 – Bevis: The Story of a Boy
- 1933 – Everybody's Lamb; The Cricket in the Cage
- 1934 – Victoria Regina
- 1935 – Perfume from Provence
- 1936 – The Modern Struwwelpeter
- 1937 – Golden Sovereign; Cheddar Gorge; As the Bee Sucks; Sunset House: More Perfume from Provence
- 1939 – The Reluctant Dragon
- 1941 – Gracious Majesty
- 1946 – The Work of the Stern Gang
- 1948 – The Golden Age; Dream Days; Bertie's Escapade
- 1949 – York
- 1950 – Drover's Tale
- 1951 – Enter David Garrick
- 1953 – The Silver Curlew
- 1954 – The Cuckoo Clock; Susan, Bill and the Wolf-Dog
- 1955 – The Glass Slipper; Operation Wild Goose; Crystal Mountain; Frogmorton; The Brownies
- 1955 – Mary in the Country
- 1956 – The Islanders; The Pancake
- 1956 – The Secret Garden
- 1956 – Royal Reflections: Stories for Children
- 1957 – Drawn from Memory; Briar Rose
- 1958 – Old Greek Fairy Tales
- 1959 – Tom Brown's School Days
- 1960 – Noble Company
- 1961 – Drawn from Life; Hans Andersen's Fairy Tales
- 1965 – Ben and Brock
- 1969 – The Wind in the Willows (colour re-illustration); The Pooh Cookbook (cover)
- 1970 – Winnie the Pooh (colour re-illustration); The House at Pooh Corner (colour re-illustration)
- 1971 – The Pooh Party Book (cover)
