= Travers (crater) =

Crater on Mercury

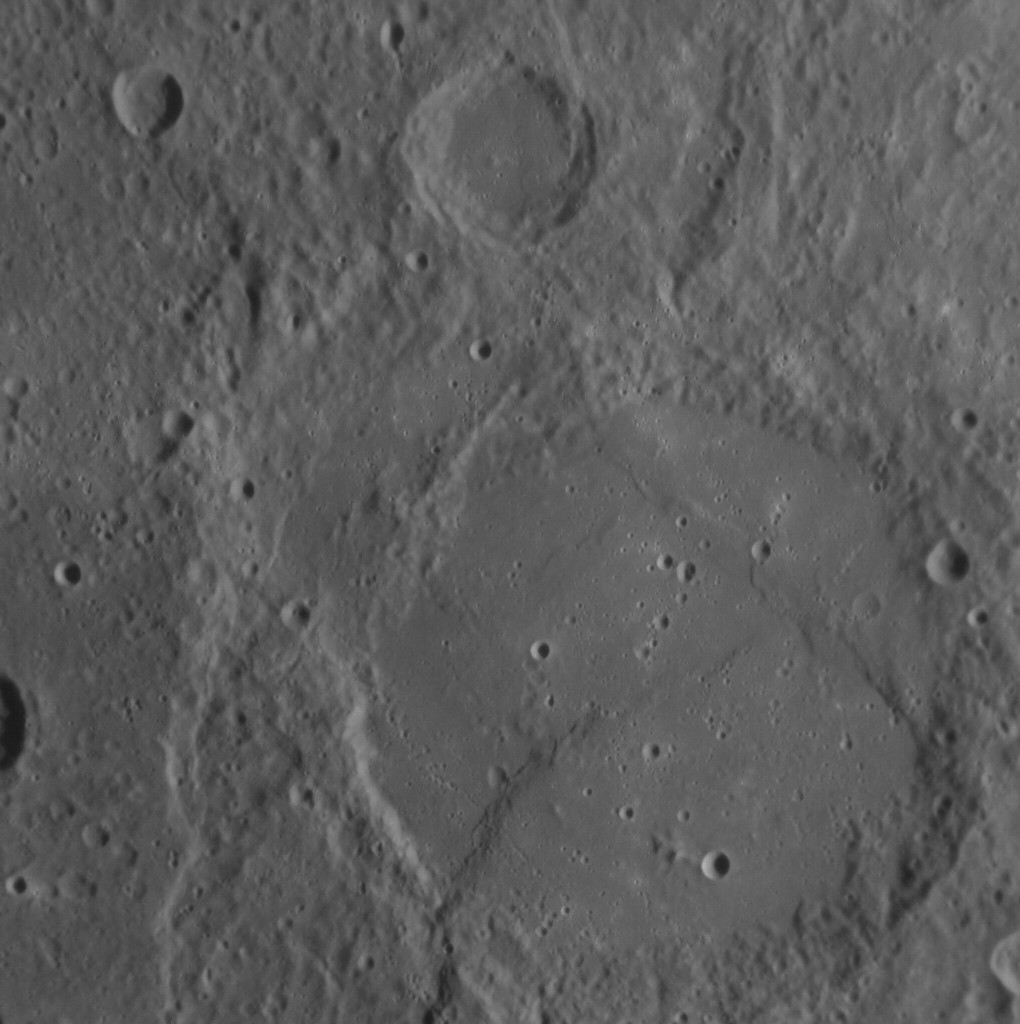
- MESSENGER NAC image
- Planet: Mercury
- Coordinates: 28.0°S 329.1°W
- Quadrangle: Debussy
- Diameter: 164 km (102 mi)
- Eponym: P. L. Travers

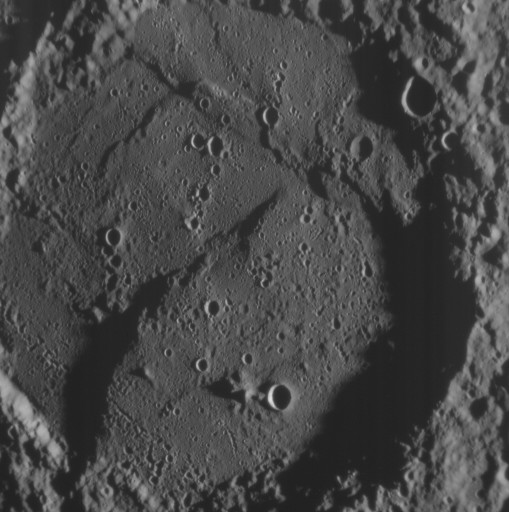
Travers crater at a low sun angle

Travers is a crater on Mercury. Its name was adopted by the International Astronomical Union (IAU) in 2018, after the British writer Pamela Lyndon Travers.

The scarps cutting across Travers crater are called Kainan Rupes. They extend to the southwest of the crater.
