= Mary Shepard =

British illustrator (1909–2000)

- Born: 25 December 1909; Wonersh, Surrey, England
- Died: 4 September 2000 (aged 90); London, England
- Notable work: Mary Poppins
- Spouse: E. V. Knox (m. 1937; died 1971)
- Children: Penelope Fitzgerald (step-daughter)
- Father: E. H. Shepard
- Relatives: Graham Shepard (brother); Wilfred Knox (brother-in-law); Ronald Knox (brother-in-law); Dilly Knox (brother-in-law); Winifred Peck (sister-in-law)

Mary Eleanor Jessie Knox (née Shepard; 25 December 1909 – 4 September 2000), popularly known as Mary Shepard, was an English illustrator of children's books. She is best known for the Mary Poppins stories written by P. L. Travers (1934 to 1988). She used her married name Mary Knox outside the publishing industry.

== Life and career ==
Shepard was born in Red Cottage and raised in Shamley Green,Wonersh, Surrey. Her father was E. H. Shepard, a famous illustrator of children's literature including Winnie-the-Pooh by A. A. Milne in the 1920s and a 1931 edition of The Wind in the Willows by Kenneth Grahame. She was the illustrator for the U.S. publisher Lippincot's 1937 edition of Pigeon Post by Arthur Ransome.

Shepard graduated from the Slade School of Art. Her father was initially approached to illustrate Mary Poppins, but he was too busy at the time. Travers discovered Shepard, then 23, from her work on a Christmas card, and hired her instead. She continued to illustrate Mary Poppins books until 1982.

Shepard's elder brother, Graham Shepard, was also an illustrator and cartoonist, who worked for The Illustrated London News. He served in the RNVR during World War II and was lost along with all but one crew member when their ship, HMS Polyanthus, was sunk by the German submarine U-952 in the mid-Atlantic on 21 September 1943.

She married E. V. Knox, 28 years her senior, in 1937. He was editor of Punch and father of the writer Penelope Fitzgerald. He died in 1971.

Shepard died at a care home in Islington on 4 September 2000, at the age of 90.
