= Barbara Moriarty =

Australian Red Cross field representative (1902–1979)

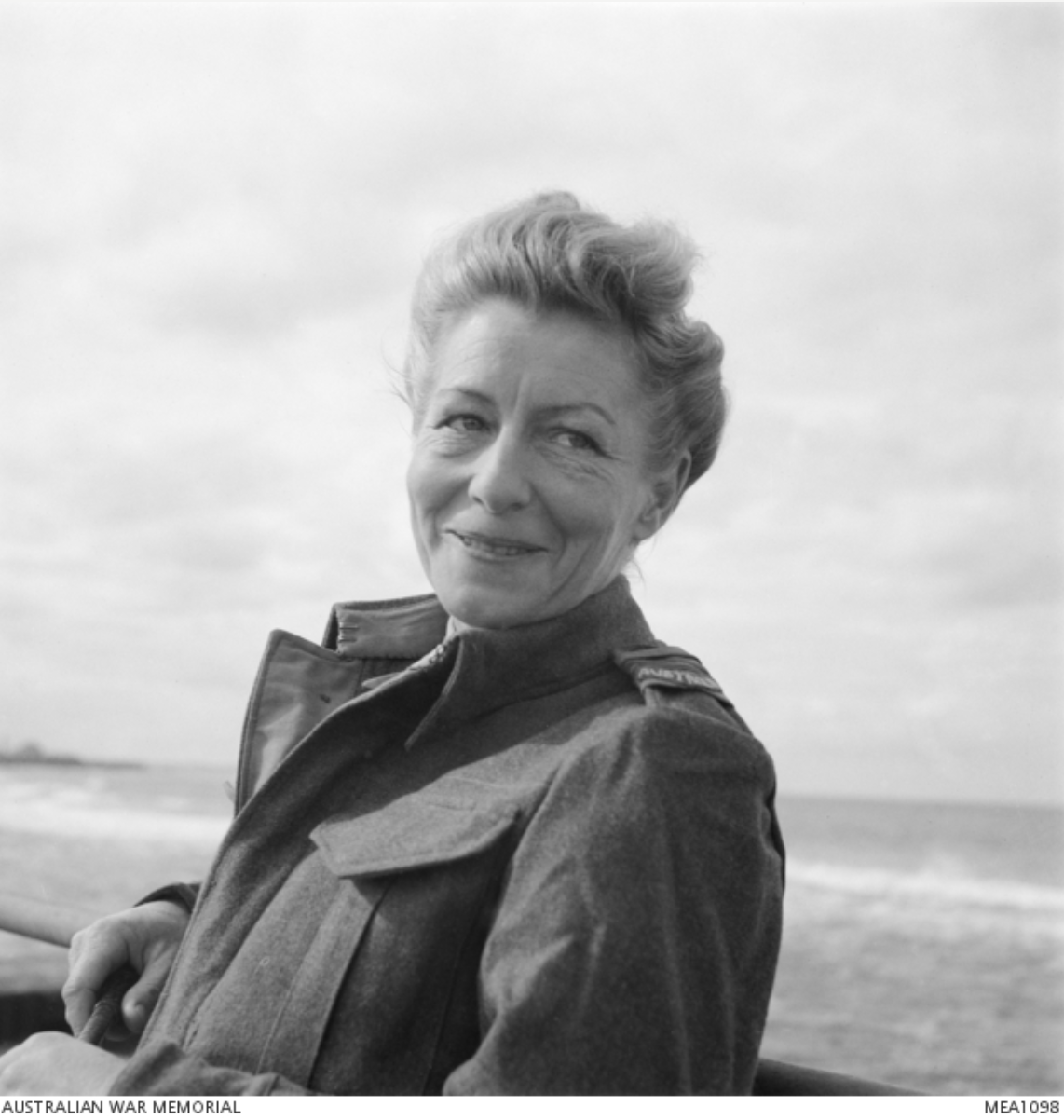
- Moriarty, in Egypt (c.1943)
- Born: 13 April 1902; Ipswich, Queensland, Australia
- Died: 11 January 1979 (aged 76); Neutral Bay, New South Wales, Australia
- Occupations: Nurse, administrator, copy-writer
- Known for: Florence Nightingale Medal in 1947

Barbara Ierne Moriarty (13 April 1902 – 11 January 1979), also known as Biddy Moriarty, was an Australian Red Cross administrator and nurse who worked to ease the lives of World War II prisoners of war on their release from captivity. Her work also required her to be a member of the Red Cross contingent in Singapore to assist the 2nd Prisoner of War Reception Group. She was awarded the Florence Nightingale Medal in 1947 "for her distinguished work with the Red Cross."

== Biography ==
Moriarty was born on 13 April 1902 at Ipswich, Queensland. Her husband, Boyd Moriarty, was killed in action on Crete in May 1941. They had no children

Biddy Moriarty joined the Australian Comforts Fund so she could help those in Palestinian camps. She was stationed with the Royal Navy at Alexandria, Egypt, and later worked with the 2nd/2nd Australian General Hospital at Kantara, Egypt as part of the Australian Red Cross Society's field force. In February 1942, she was returned to Australia to take on Red Cross duties at locations across Australia. She was promoted to superintendent in December.

In 1943, Moriarty returned to the Middle East to help with the repatriation of former Australian prisoners of war. In August she was promoted to senior superintendent; and she was promoted again to commandant in April 1944. Assigned to the Australian Army Staff in London, she was charged with preparing the reception of exchanged and liberated Australian prisoners of war who were expected to arrive after the Allies invaded Western Europe. At that time, she was attached to the A.I.F. Reception Group, which repatriated numerous prisoners after Germany's surrender in May 1945.

=== Post-war years ===
Moriarty was discharged from the Red Cross on 30 July 1946. A year later, she joined the Sydney staff of David Jones Ltd, where she remained until February 1965. She died at 76 on 11 January 1979.
