= Mary Poppins (book series) =

Series of children's books by P. L. Travers

- The first four Mary Poppins books
- Mary Poppins; Mary Poppins Comes Back; Mary Poppins Opens the Door; Mary Poppins in the Park; Mary Poppins from A to Z; Mary Poppins in the Kitchen; Mary Poppins in Cherry Tree Lane; Mary Poppins and the House Next Door
- Author: P. L. Travers
- Illustrator: Mary Shepard
- Country: United Kingdom
- Genre: Children's literature
- Publisher: Gerald Howe, London; Reynal & Hitchcock, New York
- Published: 1934–1988
- Media type: Hardback

Mary Poppins is a series of eight children's books written by Australian-British writer P. L. Travers and published over the period 1934 to 1988. Mary Shepard was the illustrator throughout the series. The series began with Mary Poppins in 1934.

The books centre on the magical English nanny Mary Poppins, who is blown by the east wind to Number 17 Cherry Tree Lane, London, and into the Banks household to care for their children. Encounters with pavement-painters and shopkeepers, and various adventures ensue, until Mary Poppins abruptly leaves, i.e., "pops out". Only the first three of the eight books feature Mary Poppins arriving and leaving. The later five books recount previously unrecorded adventures from her original three visits. As Travers explains in her introduction to Mary Poppins in the Park, "She cannot forever arrive and depart."

The books were adapted by Walt Disney into a musical film titled Mary Poppins (1964), starring Julie Andrews and Dick Van Dyke. The film Saving Mr. Banks (2013) depicted the making of the 1964 film. Disney's sequel to the 1964 film, Mary Poppins Returns, was released in 2018, and stars Emily Blunt as Poppins.

In 2004, Disney Theatrical in collaboration with Sir Cameron Mackintosh (who had previously acquired the stage rights from Travers) produced a stage musical also called Mary Poppins in London's West End theatre. The stage musical was transferred to Broadway, in New York, in 2006, where it ran until its closing on 3 March 2013.

== Books ==
=== Mary Poppins, published 1934 ===
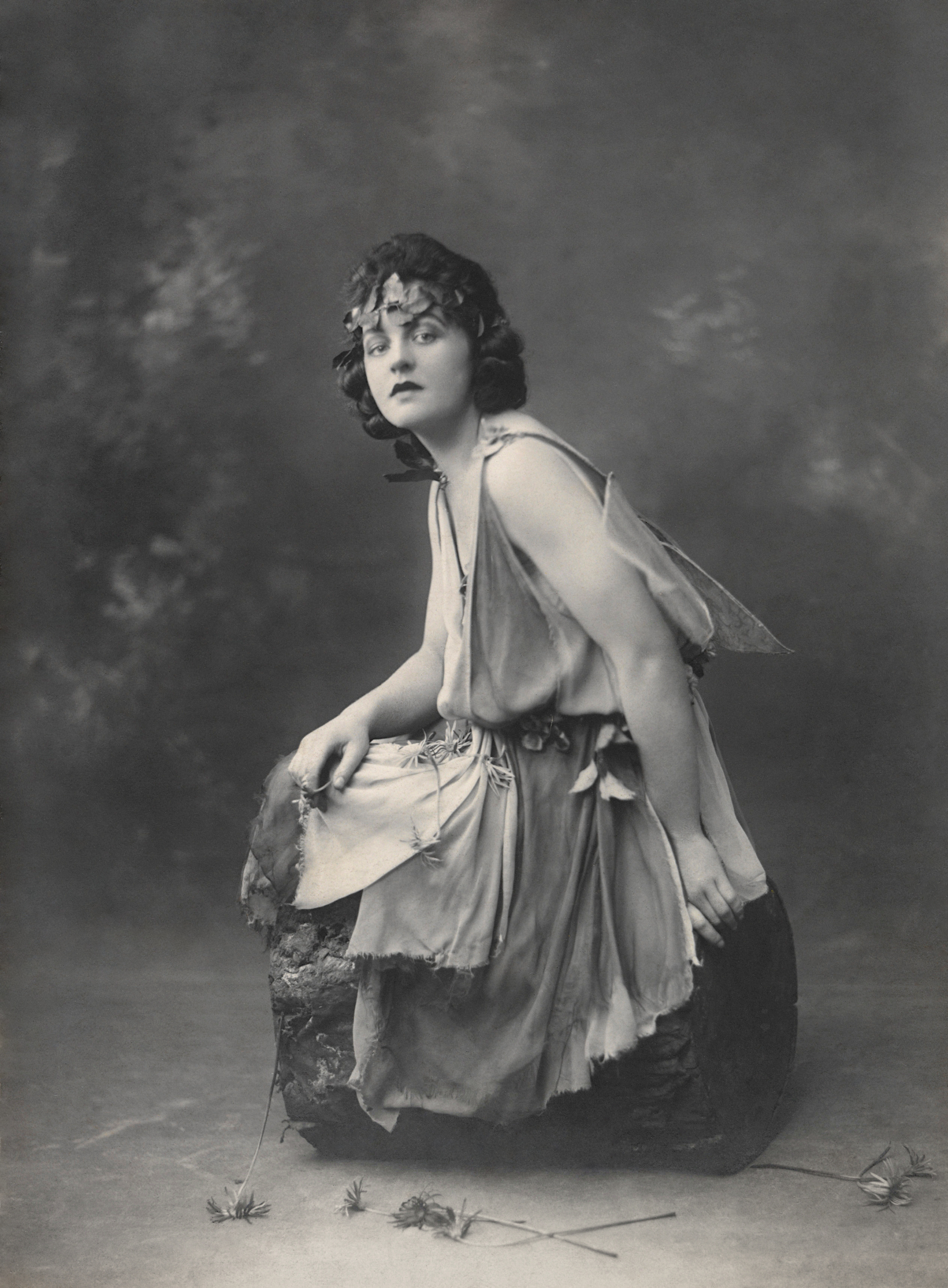
Author P. L. Travers in a 1922 stage production

The first book introduces the Banks family from Number Seventeen Cherry Tree Lane, London, (Note: There is a real street in London named Cherry Tree Lane, in South Hornchurch.) consisting of Mr and Mrs Banks, their children Jane and Michael, and baby twins John and Barbara. When the children's nanny, Katie Nanna, storms out in a huff, Mary Poppins arrives at their home, complete with her travelling carpet bag, blown in by a very strong east wind. She accepts the job (agreeing to stay "till the wind changes"), and the children soon learn that their nanny, though stern, vain and usually cross, has a magical touch that makes her wonderful. Among the things Jane and Michael experience are a tea party on a ceiling with Mr Wigg, a trip around the world with a compass, the purchase of gingerbread stars from the extremely old Mrs Corry, a meeting with the Bird Woman, a birthday party at the zoo among the animals, and a Christmas shopping trip with a star named Maia from the Pleiades cluster in the constellation Taurus. In the end, in what is perhaps the most iconic image associated with Mary Poppins, she opens her umbrella and the west wind carries her away. She leaves behind a note letting the children know that they will meet her again someday.

==== Original and revised versions of the "Bad Tuesday" chapter ====
Mary Poppins contained a version of the chapter "Bad Tuesday" in which Mary and the children use a compass to visit places all over the world in a remarkably short period of time. The original story in the 1934 edition contained a variety of cultural and ethnic stereotypes of Chinese, Native Alaskan or Inuit, sub-Saharan Africans, and Native Americans. Travers responded to criticism by revising the chapter twice. A 1967 revision removed offensive words and stereotypical descriptions and dialogue, but kept the plot of visiting foreign people, and retained drawings of ethnic stereotypes standing at the compass-points. In 1981, a second revision replaced people with animals; original illustrator Mary Shepard altered the four compass points in the accompanying drawing to show a polar bear at the north, a macaw at the south, a panda at the east, and a dolphin at the west. Mary Poppins had been banned from circulation in the San Francisco Public Library system in 1980 due to the negative stereotyping. The 1981 revised version was included in BBC Radio 4's 2004 adaptation of Mary Poppins starring Juliet Stevenson.

=== Mary Poppins Comes Back, published 1935 ===
Nothing has been right since Mary Poppins left Number Seventeen Cherry Tree Lane. One day, when Mrs. Banks sends the children out to the park, Michael flies his kite up into the clouds. Everyone is surprised when Michael reels his kite in to find that Mary Poppins is at the end of the string. She takes charge of the children once again (though she'll only stay "'til the chain of her locket breaks"). This time, Jane and Michael meet the fearsome Miss Andrew, experience an upside-down tea party, and visit a circus in the sky. In the chapter "The New One" a girl, Annabel, is born into the Banks family, and concludes the family of now five children: three daughters and two sons. As in Mary Poppins, Mary leaves at the end (via an enchanted merry-go-round, throwing her locket towards the children as she disappears), but this time with a "return ticket, just in case" she needs to return.

=== Mary Poppins Opens the Door, published 1943 ===
When Mary last left the Banks children in Cherry Tree Lane, she took a "return ticket, just in case". In the third book, she returns to the park in front of Cherry Tree Lane the way she came, falling with fireworks. Once again she takes up nanny duties in the Banks household and leads Jane, Michael, the toddler twins John and Barbara (as well as the new baby girl Annabel) on various magical adventures. This time, they visit her cousin Fred Twigley, befriend a statue that has come to life, go riding on peppermint horses, and experience a garden party under the sea.

This book has the story where Mary permanently leaves Cherry Tree Lane at the end of the book. She opens her umbrella, and it carries her off into the night. The children are happy she kept her promise to stay until the door opened, and they and their parents happily gather round the fire. (Presumably this means the Banks parents have now learned to spend more time with their children, thanks to Mary Poppins's lessons.)

=== Mary Poppins in the Park, published 1952 ===
This fourth book contains six adventures of the Banks children with Mary Poppins during their outings in the park along Cherry Tree Lane. Chronologically the events in this book occurred during the second or third book (Mary Poppins Comes Back and Mary Poppins Opens the Door respectively). Among the adventures they experience are a tea party with the people who live under the dandelions, a visit to cats on a different planet, and a Halloween dance party with their shadows.

=== Mary Poppins From A to Z, published 1962 ===
Twenty-six vignettes (one for each letter of the alphabet) tell the tales of Mary Poppins, the Banks children, and other characters from Travers's previous novels. Each vignette is filled with unusual words that start with the featured letter.

=== Mary Poppins in the Kitchen, published 1975 ===
Mary Poppins comes to the rescue when the Banks's family cook goes on an unexpected leave, teaching the young Banks children the basics of cooking in the process. The book includes recipes.

=== Mary Poppins in Cherry Tree Lane, published 1982 ===
Mary Poppins takes the Banks children on yet another memorable adventure, this time on the magical Midsummer's Eve. All kinds of strange things can happen, and even mythical figures can descend from the heavens. At the back of the book is a list of the herbs that are mentioned in the story, with their botanical, local and Latin names.

=== Mary Poppins and the House Next Door, published 1988 ===
The residents of Cherry Tree Lane are distressed to learn that their beloved Number Eighteen, an empty house for which each neighbour has created an imaginary, wished-for tenant, is about to be occupied by Mr. Banks' childhood governess, Miss Andrew, otherwise known as "the Holy Terror". Her dreaded arrival brings a pleasant surprise as well, for Luti, a boy from the South Seas, has accompanied her as both servant and student. Delighted by the prospect of a new friend, Jane and Michael are frustrated by the restrictions that the hypochondriacal Miss Andrew has placed on Luti, who grows more and more homesick for his family and tropical surroundings. When the call in his heart to return home becomes more than he can bear, it is Mary Poppins who makes the trip possible by means of a visit to the Man in the Moon.

== Adaptations ==
Due to the series' popularity, there were several adaptations of the books to various media. Some notable adaptations include: Мэри Поппинс, до свидания (eng. Mary Poppins, Goodbye), a Russian musical-film adaptation of the books by producer Leonid Kvinikhidze.

== Main characters ==
=== Mary Poppins ===
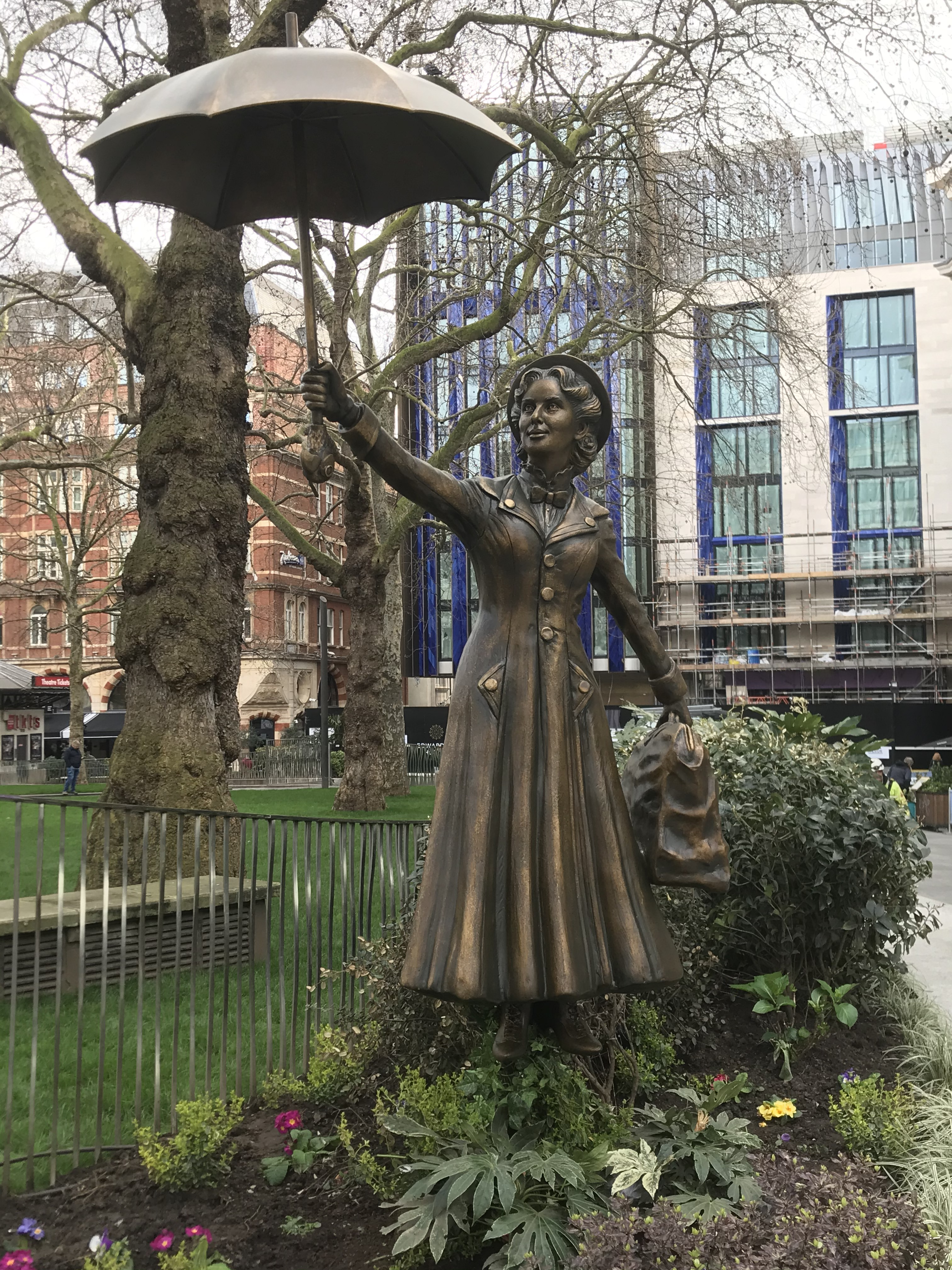
Mary Poppins statue in Leicester Square, London

Mary Poppins is a magical nanny who sweeps into the Banks home on Cherry Tree Lane and takes charge of the Banks children. She never acknowledges her strange and magical powers, and feigns ignorance when one of the children refers to her previous adventures. She first arrives with her open umbrella when she is blown to Cherry Tree Lane by the east wind. At the end of the first book, she opens up her umbrella to the west wind and lets it lift her up into the air and away from the children. In the 1964 Disney film of the same name, she is portrayed by Julie Andrews; in the 2018 sequel Mary Poppins Returns, she is portrayed by Emily Blunt; in the 2004 BBC Radio 4 drama, she is played by Juliet Stevenson; in the 2004 West End musical adaptation, she is portrayed by Laura Michelle Kelly.

=== Parrot umbrella ===
He is Mary Poppins's umbrella. He has a parrot head for a handle, and is the colour black. He is always picked up and taken everywhere by Mary Poppins. (The reason she never goes anywhere without him is revealed in the story "The Day Out", being that she likes to look her best, and his beautiful parrot-headed handle makes her look her best.) At the end of the first book, she opens him up on the first day of spring, and the blowing wind blows into him and lifts him and Mary Poppins into the air and away from the Banks family's house. He loves flying, as stated in the final story of the third book, when after "opening the door", Mary Poppins opens him up and he soars up quickly, as if glad to be free. Since he is magical, he can talk as well as fly. In the 1964 film, he is aware of how Mary Poppins really feels about the children, but she denies it, saying that they should love their father more than her. In the 1964 Disney film, he is voiced by David Tomlinson, who also played Mr Banks. In the 2018 sequel, he is voiced by Edward Hibbert.

=== Banks children ===
In the books there are five Banks children: Jane (the eldest), Michael, fraternal twins John and Barbara, and Annabel. Jane and Michael are the eldest and go on most of the magical adventures with Mary Poppins; they are the most prominent and vocal of the Banks children. John and Barbara are toddler twins who only start going on adventures in the second book. Annabel is the youngest and is born midway through the second book. Though the ages of the children are never made explicit (and, like Mary Poppins, they do not appear to age over the course of the series), Jane is estimated to be around seven years old in Mary Poppins with Michael being a year or two younger, and John and Barbara have their first birthday in the same book and appear to be around two years old when Annabel is born. Only Jane and Michael appear in the film and stage musical. In the film they are portrayed by Karen Dotrice and Matthew Garber; in the 2018 sequel, they are portrayed as adults by Emily Mortimer and Ben Whishaw; in the 2004 BBC Radio 4 drama, they are played by Sophie Stuckey and Jonathan Bee. John and Annabel appear in the 2018 film Mary Poppins Returns, but are presented as being Michael's children, rather than his siblings. Michael also has a third child in the film named Georgie (most likely named after Michael's father).

=== Mr Banks ===
George Banks is Mary Poppins's employer. He works at a bank and lives at 17 Cherry Tree Lane with his wife and their children. In the books, he is rarely present, but is gruffly loving of his wife and children. In the film, he has a more prominent role as a cross man, preoccupied with work, who wants order and largely ignores his children and wife; but later on his attitude changes for the better, as Bert convinces him that while he focuses on his life at the bank, his whole life, including his children's childhood, is passing him by. Nothing of this is so much as mentioned in the book. His role in the stage musical is similar to the film, but he has an additional back-story drawn from the original books, in which he was ignored by his parents and tormented by a cruel governess during his childhood. In the 1964 Disney film, he is portrayed by David Tomlinson; in the 2004 Radio 4 drama, he is played by David Timson.

He is often consumed in his work and, throughout the film, was shown to neglect his children. But he was not a static character; his attitude changed throughout the film to finally becoming the type of affectionate father that most children would wish for, shown most prominently with him fixing his children's kite and taking them to go fly it outside. Though this is not the character specifically created in the books, he is represented well. Though he came across as brash and harsh and remained that way in the books, Disney felt that would be a pessimistic persona to portray.

The title of the film Saving Mr. Banks (as explained in dialogue at the film's climax) arises from the interpretation that Mary Poppins is actually not there to save the children, but to save their father. The film surmises that P.L. Travers wrote the Mary Poppins novels as a form of atonement for her inability as a child to save her own father from his own flaws. This theme of fatherly salvation notably formed the basis of the major dramatic moments in the 1964 film, including the climax involving Mr Banks's sombre nighttime walk through London.

=== Mrs Banks ===
Mrs Banks is married to George Banks and is the mother of Jane, Michael, John, Barbara, and Annabel Banks. Her first name is never revealed in the books, but was given as Winifred in the film and the stage musical. In the books, she is the struggling mistress of the Banks household, and is easily intimidated by Mary Poppins, who treats her with thinly veiled contempt. In the film, she is a strident suffragette (in public; at home, she is the typical Edwardian wife) who is treated somewhat satirically. She was made into a suffragette in the film to explain why she sometimes did not have time to look after her children. In the stage musical, she is a former actress who is under constant pressure from her husband as she struggles to enter his social circle. In the 1964 film, she is portrayed by Glynis Johns; in the 2004 Radio 4 drama, she is played by Deborah Berlin.

=== Park Keeper ===
The Park Keeper is a prominent supporting character in the books. He frequently appears in scenes taking place in the park, one of Mary's favourite places to take the children. He is very particular and obsessive about the Park's bylaws and such. He is very confused and sometimes annoyed by Mary Poppins's magical adventures but has learnt to accept that there are things about her he will never understand. He secretly yearns for his childhood, and finds any opportunity to join the Banks children's games such as kite flying and fireworks. His full name is Fred Smith and his mother is the Bird Woman. He does not appear in the 1964 film, but he does appear in the stage musical. In the musical, he sings the song "Let's Go Fly a Kite" with Bert and the children. He appeared in the 2018 sequel, played by Steve Nicolson.

=== Bert the Matchman ===
The Matchman or "Bert" is Mary Poppins's friend. In the books, when the weather is fine, he is a screever, but when it rains he instead sells matches and is thus known as the Matchman. Mary Poppins sometimes goes on outings with Bert on her Second Thursday off. Bert is also friendly with the Banks children and the other residents of Cherry Tree Lane. As well as match selling and street art, he has an occasional third occupation – busking with his hurdy-gurdy. In the 1964 film, Bert (portrayed by Dick Van Dyke) is a combination of the Matchman and the Sweep and has a more prominent role in the children's adventures, including taking care of Mary's Uncle Albert and giving Mr. Banks sensible parenting advice. In the stage musical he has a similar role, acting as a narrator and faraway friend of Mary and the Banks children. In the 2018 film, Bert's apprentice Jack says that Bert had earned enough money to leave London and is now off travelling the world.

=== Miss Lark ===
Miss Lucinda Lark lives next door to 17 Cherry Tree Lane. She is very rich and lives in a large mansion. She is the owner of two dogs: Andrew and Willoughby. Originally she only had Andrew, who is pure-bred, but the mongrel Willoughby joined the family at Andrew's request (the dog language translated to English by Mary Poppins). Lucinda appears throughout the books and is usually appalled by the magical antics of Mary Poppins. The most iconic thing about her is her obsession with her dogs and has been known to bring them to the hairdresser's and even buy them fur coats and boots. She appears in the film and stage musical as a minor role. In both the film and musical she only has one dog. In the film she only has Andrew, while in the musical she only has Willoughby. Willoughby also appears in the sequel. In the first film, she is portrayed by Marjorie Bennett, while she is played by Sudha Bhuchar in the sequel, and Willoughby is played by animal actor "Ash".

=== Admiral Boom ===
Admiral Boom also lives along Cherry Tree Lane. He is a former Naval Officer, but now lives in a house shaped like a ship with his wife Mrs Boom and his assistant, Binnacle, who is a former pirate. He is remarkable for his use of colourful sailor's language, although, as the books are intended for children, he never actually swears; his favourite interjection is "Blast my gizzard!" In the film he is a neighbour of the Banks family who fires his cannon to mark the time; this version of the Admiral is far less salty and more of a proper, "Shipshape and Bristol fashion" kind of sailor, insistent on order and punctuality. In the original film he is portrayed by Reginald Owen; in the 2018 sequel, he is portrayed by David Warner.

=== Other domestic employees ===
In the books, the Banks have three domestic workers in addition to Mary Poppins: Ellen, Mrs. Brill, and Robertson Ay. Ellen is the maid and although she loves the children, she hates having to look after them when there is no nanny in the house. She almost always has a cold. Mrs. Brill is the cook; she particularly dislikes Ellen. She is often grumpy for no reason. Robertson Ay is the houseboy. He is a young boy (mid-teens) and is very lazy and forgetful, doing such things as putting bootblack on Mr. Banks' hat, thus ruining it. Mary Poppins Comes Back hints that he is a character in a story that Mary Poppins tells the children about a king who is led astray by The Fool (Jester) and that the king is the Fool. The film depicts Mrs. Brill and Ellen (played by Reta Shaw and Hermione Baddeley, respectively), but not Robertson Ay; the musical includes Mrs. Brill and Robertson Ay, without Ellen. Only Ellen appears in the 2018 film, portrayed by Julie Walters. No mention is made of what happened to Mrs. Brill.

=== Friends and relatives of Mary Poppins ===
- Bird Woman: An old woman who sits on the steps of St Paul's Cathedral and feeds the birds. She sells bags of crumbs to passers-by for tuppence a bag. Her catch-phrase is 'feed the birds, tuppence a bag'. She appears a few times throughout the books and is good friends with Mary. It is later revealed that she is the mother of the Park Keeper and her real name is Mrs. Smith. She appears in the 1964 film played by Jane Darwell (in her final film appearance) and is the subject of the song "Feed the Birds" sung by Poppins. She also plays a similar role in the musical, where she sings the song "Feed the Birds" as a duet with Mary.
- Mrs Clara Corry: An extremely elderly woman, who is suggested to be the oldest woman in the world. She is said to have been in her teens when the world was created, and knew William the Conqueror and Alfred the Great. She owns a shop where she sells gingerbread. She is able to snap off her own fingers, and they instantly turn to barley sugar or other sweets, while her own fingers grow back. She appears several times across the books along with her daughters. Mrs. Corry has a minor role in the 1964 film, played by Alma Lawnton. In the musical she has a larger role and owns a 'conversation shop', leading the song "Supercalifragilisticexpialidocious" alongside Mary and Bert. In the 2004 Radio 4 drama, she is played by Phyllida Law.
- Annie and Fannie: Mrs Corry's extremely large daughters, whom she constantly bullies and torments. They usually accompany their mother. They have small roles in both the 1964 film and the musical.
- Albert Wigg: Mary's uncle, presumably her mother's brother; a large round bald man with a jovial personality. If his birthday falls on a Friday, he comes so full of 'laughing gas' that he floats up in the air. He appears in the 1964 film as Uncle Albert, played by Ed Wynn, and sings the song "I Love to Laugh" with Bert. He is absent from the musical.
- Arthur and Topsy Turvy: Mary's cousin and his wife. Arthur Turvy mends broken objects, and he suffers from a condition by which he becomes forced to do the opposite of what he wants (e.g., standing on his head when he wants to stand normally) from 3:00 to 6:00 pm on the second Monday of every month. Despite this he falls in love with Topsy and marries her. Topsy Turvy was portrayed by Meryl Streep in the film Mary Poppins Returns. In the 2004 BBC Radio 4 drama, Arthur is played by Andrew Sachs.
- Fred Twigley: Mary Poppins's cousin. He gets to have seven wishes granted on the first New Moon, after the second rainy Sunday, after 3 May, as a present from his Godmother.
- Balloon Woman: An old woman and a friend of Mary's who sells balloons in the park. Her balloons seem to have a magical quality as the name of whoever buys them appears on them. She appeared in the film Mary Poppins Returns played by Angela Lansbury.
- Nellie-Rubina and Uncle Dodger: Two human-sized wooden dolls with flat faces. They run a "conversation shop" that is shaped like Noah's Ark. In the stage musical Nellie's conversation shop does appear, but is run instead by Mrs. Corry.
- Neleus: A marble statue of the Greek mythological character Neleus. He is brought to life by Mary Poppins, and he reveals he longs to be reunited with his father, Poseidon. He appears in the stage musical during the "Jolly Holiday" sequence.
- Orion: Based on both the mythological character and the personification of the constellation, Orion is a friend of Mary's. He often comes down to Earth from the sky to meet her.

=== Others ===
- Miss Naomi Andrew: The large overbearing former nanny of the Banks children's father. She is extremely strict and often cruel, resulting in her nickname 'The Holy Terror'. Almost everyone is afraid of her, including Mr. Banks, though not Mary Poppins. Miss Andrew attempts to impose herself on the Banks children's lives, firstly by coming to stay at their home, and later by moving next door, but is foiled by Poppins. Though she does not appear in every book, she is often mentioned. Mrs. Banks even threatens to hire her if the Banks children do not behave. While she is absent in the film, she does have a prominent role in the stage musical. She is a similar character to the books and sings the song "Brimstone and Treacle" referring to the "medicine" she gives to children as punishment.
- The Sweep: Appearing on a few occasions, the chimney sweep is a workman frequently present on Cherry Tree Lane. He has worked for Miss Lark, Admiral Boom and the Banks family. He believes it is good luck to shake hands with a sweep, so encourages all who meet him to shake hands with him. The Sweep is particularly friendly with the Banks children and, on one occasion, alongside Bert and the Park Keeper, he takes them along for fireworks. In the film and the musical, the character of the sweep is merged with that of Bert, and becomes a much more prominent character. His superstition about shaking hands with a sweep is referenced in the song "Chim Chim Cher-ee". The composite character of Bert and the Sweep is portrayed by Dick Van Dyke in the 1964 film.
- Constable Cody Egbert: The local policeman. He is good friends of the Park Keeper, and is secretly in love with Ellen, the Banks' maid. He is a triplet, and his two brothers Herbert and Albert are also policemen, although according to him, they are completely different in personality. In the film his last name is Jones and he is played by Arthur Treacher. He also makes a brief appearance in the stage musical.
- Professor: An elderly gentleman and resident of Cherry Tree Lane. He is very friendly with Miss Lark and it is hinted that she is his love interest.
- Ice Cream Man: A street seller, who cycles around on his ice cream cart selling ice-creams. He appears at various points throughout the books.
- Lord Mayor: The local Mayor, who is a frequent figure in and around Cherry Tree Lane. He often comes to the park to check on the Park Keeper, whom he does not always trust. The Lord Mayor is often accompanied by two Aldermen.
- Prime Minister: The British Prime Minister, who often appears in scenes alongside the Park Keeper and the Mayor.

=== One-off characters ===
- The Red Cow: A self-described 'model cow' whom Mary Poppins remembers as a good friend of her mother. A fallen star once became caught on her horn, causing her to dance uncontrollably until in desperation she jumped over the moon. Unexpectedly, she finds she misses the happy feeling that dancing gave her, and on the advice of Mary Poppins's mother, she decides to search for another star. In Mary Poppins, Michael sees the Red Cow walking down Cherry Tree Lane in search of a star, leading Mary Poppins to tell her story to the children.
- Maia: The second daughter of the seven Pleiades, who visits the children during their Christmas shopping to buy presents for all of her six sisters.
- The Hamadryad: An old and wise snake (a king cobra), stated to be "the King of all beasts", who is Mary Poppins's first cousin once removed on her mother's side. He lives at London Zoo. He is the host of Mary Poppins's birthday party whenever it falls on a full moon.

=== Appearances of recurring characters ===
	Mary Poppins (1934)	Mary Poppins Comes Back (1935)	Mary Poppins Opens the Door (1943)	Mary Poppins in the Park (1952)	Mary Poppins from A to Z (1962)	Mary Poppins in the Kitchen (1975)	Mary Poppins in Cherry Tree Lane (1982)	Mary Poppins in the House Next Door (1988)	Mary Poppins (1964 film)	Mary Poppins (2004 musical)	Mary Poppins Returns (2018 film)
	Book series								Disney adaptation		
Mary Poppins	Yes	Yes	Yes	Yes	Yes	Yes	Yes	Yes	Yes	Yes	Yes
Parrot Umbrella	Yes	Yes	Yes	Yes	Yes	Yes	Yes	Yes	Yes	Yes	Yes
Jane	Yes	Yes	Yes	Yes	Yes	Yes	Yes	Yes	Yes	Yes	Yes
Michael	Yes	Yes	Yes	Yes	Yes	Yes	Yes	Yes	Yes	Yes	Yes
John	Yes	Yes	Yes	Yes	Yes	Yes	Yes	No	No	No	Yes
Barbara	Yes	Yes	Yes	Yes	Yes	Yes	Yes	Yes	No	No	No
Annabel	No	Yes	Yes	Yes	Yes	Yes	Yes	Yes	No	No	Yes
Mr. Banks	Yes	Yes	Yes	Yes	Yes	Yes	Yes	Yes	Yes	Yes	No
Mrs. Banks	Yes	Yes	Yes	Yes	Yes	Yes	Yes	Yes	Yes	Yes	No
Park Keeper	No	Yes	Yes	Yes	Yes	Yes	Yes	Yes	No	Yes	Yes
Bert	Yes	Yes	Yes	Yes	Yes	No	Yes	No	Yes	Yes	No
Ellen	Yes	Yes	Yes	Yes	Yes	No	Yes	Yes	Yes	No	Yes
Mrs. Brill	Yes	Yes	Yes	Yes	Yes	Yes	No	Yes	Yes	Yes	No
Robertson Ay	Yes	Yes	Yes	Yes	Yes	No	No	Yes	No	Yes	No
Admiral Boom	Yes	Yes	Yes	Yes	Yes	Yes	Yes	Yes	Yes	Yes	Yes
Miss Lark	Yes	Yes	Yes	Yes	Yes	Yes	Yes	Yes	Yes	Yes	Yes
Mrs. Corry	Yes	No	Yes	Yes	Yes	Yes	Yes	No	Yes	Yes	No
Bird Woman	Yes	No	Yes	Yes	Yes	Yes	Yes	No	Yes	Yes	No
Miss Andrew	No	Yes	Yes	Yes	No	No	No	Yes	No	Yes	No
Albert Wigg	Yes	No	Yes	Yes	No	No	No	No	Yes	No	No
Topsy Turvy	No	Yes	Yes	No	No	Yes	Yes	No	No	No	Yes
Arthur Turvy	No	Yes	Yes	No	No	Yes	Yes	No	No	No	Yes
Balloon Woman	No	Yes	Yes	No	Yes	No	No	No	No	No	Yes
Sweep	No	Yes	Yes	No	Yes	No	No	No	Yes	Yes	No
Fannie & Annie	Yes	No	Yes	Yes	No	Yes	Yes	No	Yes	Yes	No
Fred Twigley	No	No	Yes	No	No	Yes	No	No	No	No	No
Nellie Rubina	No	Yes	Yes	No	No	No	No	No	No	No	Yes
Uncle Dodger	No	Yes	Yes	No	No	No	No	No	No	No	No
Neleus	No	Yes	Yes	Yes	No	No	No	No	No	Yes	No
Constable Egbert	Yes	Yes	Yes	Yes	Yes	Yes	Yes	No	Yes	Yes	No
Professor	Yes	Yes	Yes	Yes	Yes	No	Yes	No	No	No	No
Mrs. Boom	Yes	Yes	Yes	Yes	No	No	Yes	Yes	No	No	No
Binnacle	No	No	Yes	No	Yes	No	No	Yes	Yes	No	Yes
Orion	No	Yes	No	No	No	No	Yes	No	No	No	No
Ice Cream Man	No	Yes	Yes	Yes	Yes	Yes	Yes	No	No	No	No
Prime Minister	No	Yes	Yes	Yes	Yes	No	Yes	Yes	No	No	No
Lord Mayor	No	Yes	Yes	Yes	Yes	No	No	No	No	No	No
Aldermen	No	No	Yes	Yes	Yes	No	No	No	No	No	No
Andrew	Yes	Yes	Yes	Yes	Yes	Yes	Yes	Yes	Yes	No	No
Willoughby	Yes	Yes	Yes	Yes	Yes	Yes	Yes	Yes	No	Yes	Yes
